= Andrew L. Stone =

American film director (1902–1999)

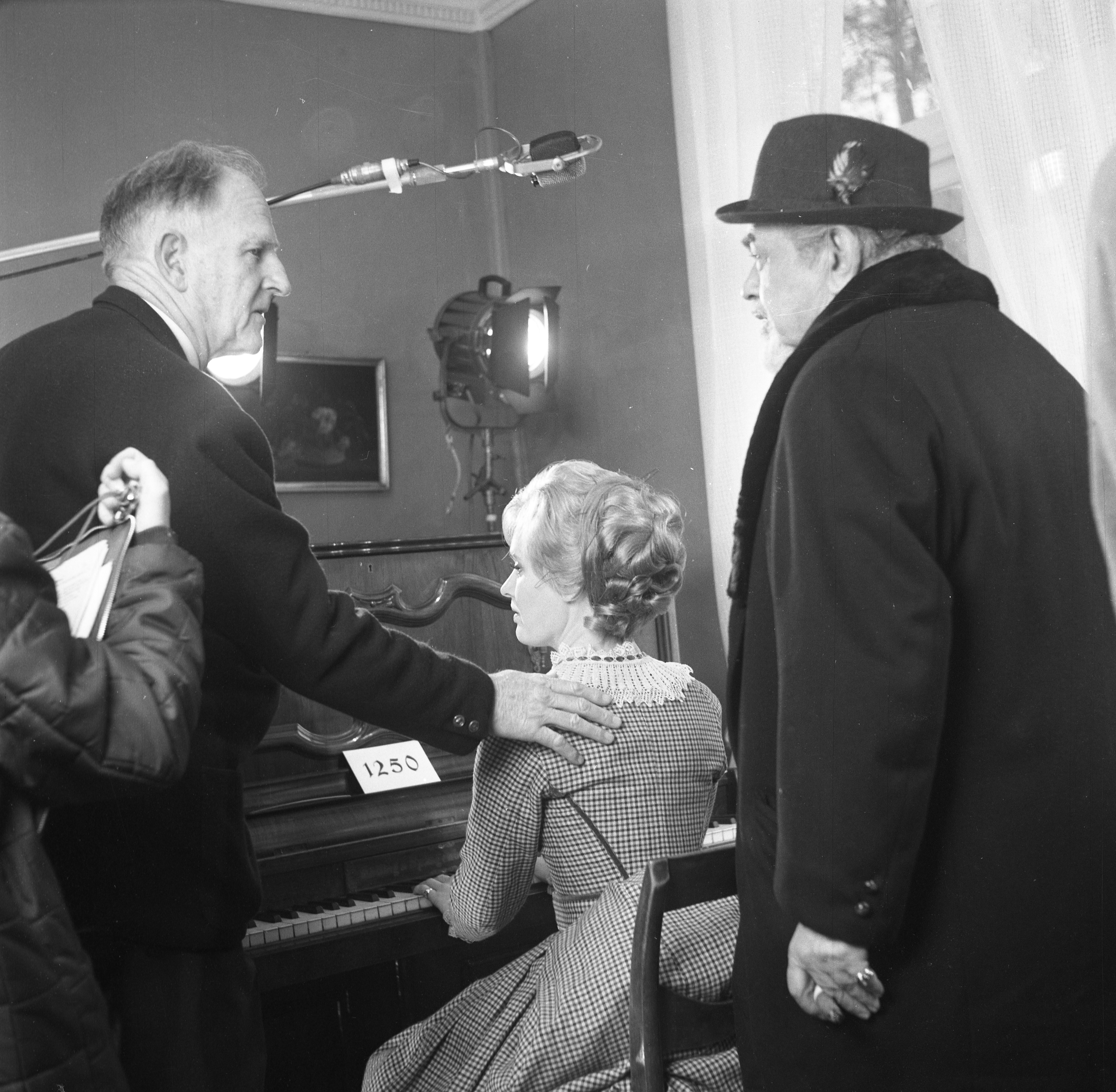
- Stone (left) on set of Song of Norway with Florence Henderson and Edward G. Robinson, 1969.
- Born: July 16, 1902; Oakland, California, U.S.
- Died: June 9, 1999 (aged 96); Los Angeles, California, U.S.
- Occupations: Screenwriter; Film director Film producer
- Spouse(s): Anne Harrington McCrary (m. 1929-1946; divorced); Virginia L. Stone (m. 1946–1970; divorced); Audrey Stone (m. 19??–1999; his death)

Andrew Lysander Stone (July 16, 1902 – June 9, 1999) was an American screenwriter, film director and producer. He was nominated for an Academy Award for Best Original Screenplay for the film Julie in 1957 and received a star on the Hollywood Walk of Fame in 1960.

Known for his hard-hitting, realistic films, Stone frequently collaborated with his second wife, editor and producer Virginia Lively Stone (m. 1946). Though few of his films achieved mainstream success, Stone was nominated for an Academy Award for Best Original Screenplay for his 1956 thriller Julie.

Stone's stories frequently featured characters called Cole, Pringle and Pope, usually in law enforcement and interchangeably played by the same actors—Jack Kruschen, Barney Phillips and John Gallaudet. Roles with those names were included in A Blueprint for Murder, The Night Holds Terror, Julie, Cry Terror! and The Decks Ran Red.

== Career ==
Born in Oakland, California, Andrew L. Stone attended the University of California. He built a movie theater in his back yard, with two projectors and seats for 50 kids. Films were bought at a dollar a reel.

Stone worked for a film exchange for Universal after school and on Sundays. "I wanted anything I could get to do with films - rewinding, splicing, projecting," he once said.

In the mid-'20s, he moved to Hollywood and worked in a laboratory. He also worked in Universal's prop department.

=== Early movies ===
In 1926, Stone financed his first directorial effort The Elegy (1926), a two-reel short film. It cost $3,200 and was made on sets left over from Scaramouche. He directed three short live-action short films for Charles Mintz's Winkler Pictures, which were distributed by Paramount Publix Corporation.

His first full-length feature was Dreary House (1928). He worked as director on Shadows of Glory (1930), Hell's Headquarters (1932) and The Girl Said No (1937).

=== Paramount ===
Stone said that MGM offered him a contract in the mid-1930s but he was reluctant to take it. He later said, "I'd have had to pacify the stars and keep them happy – like a priest who doesn't believe a word of what he says. Then there was a Paramount contract—no big stars, but freedom. That's the one I went for. It didn't take me long to see I'd never make a nickel, but I didn't give a damn."

Stone signed a contract at Paramount for whom he made Stolen Heaven (1938), Say It in French (1938) with Ray Milland, The Great Victor Herbert (1939), and The Hard-Boiled Canary (1941). He was meant to make Manhattan Rhapsody for the studio.

At 20th Century Fox he earned acclaim for directing the 1943 film Stormy Weather, starring Lena Horne.

=== United Artists ===
Stone formed his own production company, Andrew L Stone Productions, with his then-wife Virginia. They signed a deal with United Artists to make two films: Hi Diddle Diddle (1943) and Sensations of 1945 (1944). United Artists were pleased enough to offer him a deal to make four more films over eighteen months: Bedside Manner (1945), The Bachelor's Daughters (1946), and Fun on a Weekend (1947). They left United Artists in 1947.

He did some uncredited directing on The Countess of Monte Cristo (1948).

=== Thrillers ===
Stone went to Warner Bros for Highway 301 (1950). Highway 301 was a crime film and ushered in a series of movies from Stone in that genre.

"I had to talk Bernie Foy at Warners into letting me do a melodrama," Stone said later. "I made it practically for nothing to establish myself in that field."

It would be Stone's last film shot in a studio. He did Confidence Girl (1952), and two with Joseph Cotten, The Steel Trap (1952) and A Blueprint for Murder (1953). He did The Night Holds Terror (1955) at Columbia.

=== MGM ===
Stone signed a two-picture deal at MGM for whom he made Julie (1956), a thriller with Doris Day and Louis Jourdan, and Cry Terror! (1958), with Rod Steiger. (He had intended to follow Julie with a film about smoking, The Last Puff, but it was not made.)

Julie was a hit so MGM signed them to make four more movies: The Decks Ran Red (1959), The Last Voyage (1960), Ring of Fire (1961), and The Password Is Courage (1962) with Dirk Bogarde.

He did Never Put It in Writing (1964) with Pat Boone for Allied Artists, filmed in England and Ireland. He signed a new two-picture deal with MGM. The first was The Secret of My Success (1965). The second was meant to be a history of aviation written by Ernest Gann, The Winning of the Sky, but it was never made.

=== Later movies ===
Stone made a musical for ABC Pictures titled Song of Norway (1970), a $3.5 million musical biopic of Edvard Grieg. The film performed reasonably well, but his next film The Great Waltz (1972) was a big flop.

In 1977, he did some work for Universal on the action and disaster sequences for Rollercoaster.

== Personal life ==
Stone was married three times:

- Anne Harrington McCrary (m.1927-1946; divorced) They had two sons, Andrew Lysander Stone and Bruce Harrington Stone.
- Virginia Lively (m.1946-1970; divorced)
- Audrey (m. 19??-1999; his death)

In her memoir, Evelyn Keyes claimed that during production on Say It In French (1938), Stone raped her, which resulted in a pregnancy. Keyes aborted the pregnancy, leaving her weakened and permanently unable to have children. Rather than postponing production, Stone had her fired and replaced with Olympe Bradna.

== Selected filmography ==
- The Elegy (1927) (short) - writer, director
- Fantasy (1927) (short) - director
- Adoration (1927) (short) - writer, director
- Liebensraum (1928) -director
- Dreary House (1928) - writer, director
- Shadows of Glory aka Sombras de gloria (1930) - director
- Hell's Headquarters (1932) - director
- The Girl Said No (1937) - director, writer, producer
- With Words and Music (1937) director
- Stolen Heaven (1938) - director, writer
- Say It in French (1938) - director, producer
- The Great Victor Herbert (1939) - director, writer, producer
- The Hard-Boiled Canary (1941) - director, producer, writer
- Stormy Weather (1943) - director
- Hi Diddle Diddle (1943) - director, producer, original story
- Sensations of 1945 (1944) - director, writer, producer
- Bedside Manner (1945) - director, producer
- The Bachelor's Daughters (1946) - director, writer, producer
- Fun on a Weekend (1947) - director, writer, producer
- The Countess of Monte Cristo (1948) - director, uncredited
- Highway 301 (1950) - director, writer
- Confidence Girl (1952) - director, writer, producer
- The Steel Trap (1952) - director, writer
- A Blueprint for Murder (1953) - director, writer
- The Night Holds Terror (1955) - director, writer, producer
- Screen Directors Playhouse episode "The Final Tribute" (1955) - writer, director
- Julie (1956) - director, writer
- Cry Terror! (1958) - director, writer, producer
- The Decks Ran Red (1958) - director, writer, producer
- The Last Voyage (1960) - director, writer, producer
- Ring of Fire (1961) - director, writer, producer
- The Password Is Courage (1962) - director, writer, producer
- Never Put It in Writing (1964) - director, writer, producer
- The Secret of My Success (1965) - director, producer
- Song of Norway (1970) - director, writer, producer
- The Great Waltz (1972) - director, writer, producer
