= Joseph Cotten =

American actor (1905–1994)

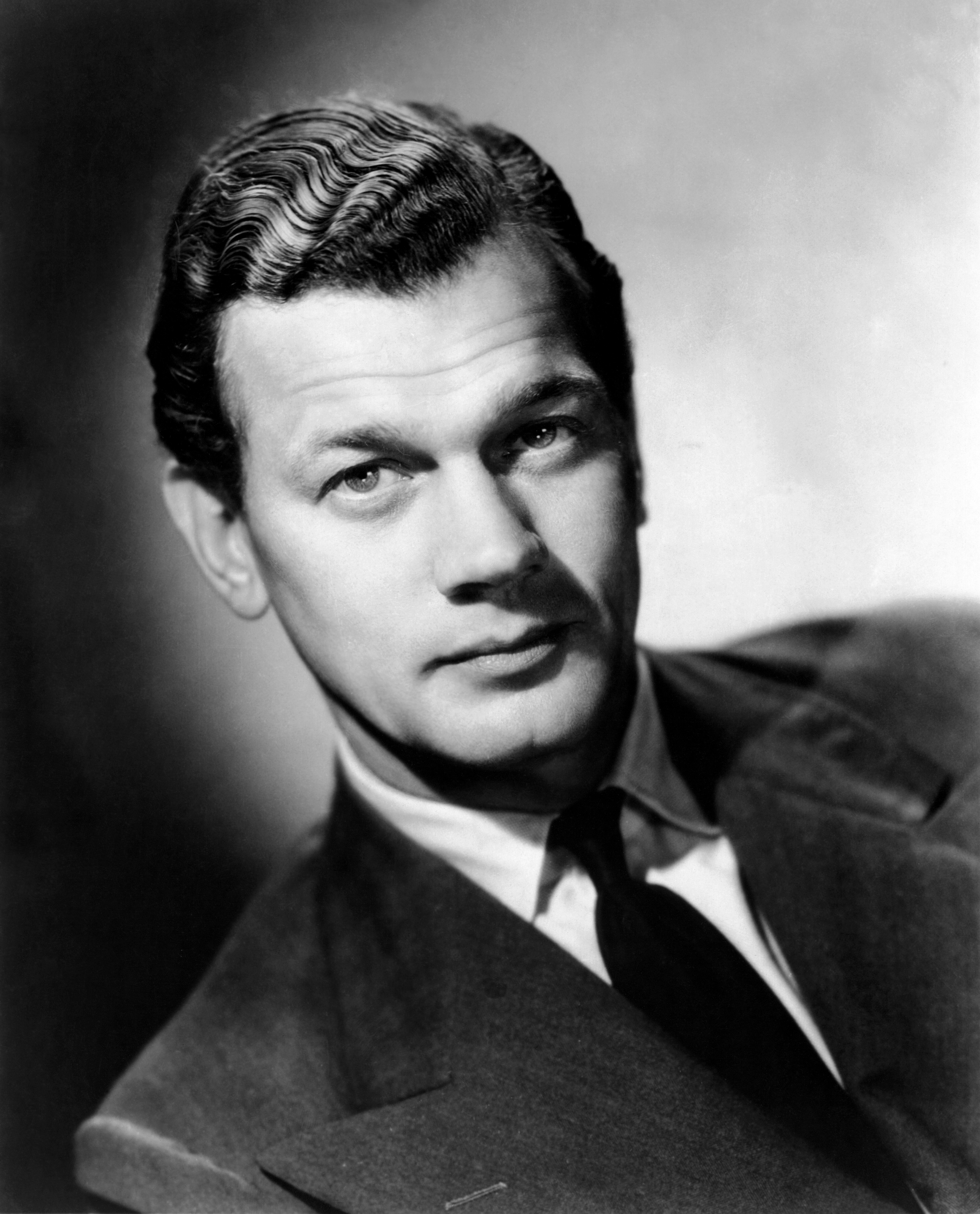
- Cotten in 1942
- Born: Joseph Cheshire Cotten Jr. May 15, 1905; Petersburg, Virginia, U.S.
- Died: February 6, 1994 (aged 88); Los Angeles, California, U.S.
- Burial place: Blandford Cemetery, Petersburg, Virginia
- Occupation: Actor
- Years active: 1930–1981
- Height: 6 ft 2 in (188 cm)
- Spouses: Lenore Kipp (m. 1931; died 1960) Patricia Medina (m. 1960)
- Children: 1
- Awards: Volpi Cup for Best Actor: 1949 Portrait of Jennie

Joseph Cheshire Cotten Jr. (May 15, 1905 – February 6, 1994) was an American film, stage, radio and television actor. Cotten achieved prominence on Broadway, starring in the original stage productions of The Philadelphia Story (1939) and Sabrina Fair (1953). He gained worldwide fame for his collaborations with Orson Welles on films Citizen Kane (1941), The Magnificent Ambersons (1942), and Journey into Fear (1943). Cotten starred in the latter and was also credited with the screenplay.

Cotten became one of the leading Hollywood actors of the 1940s, appearing in films such as Shadow of a Doubt (1943); Gaslight (1944); Love Letters (1945); Duel in the Sun (1946); The Farmer's Daughter (1947); Portrait of Jennie (1948), for which he won the Volpi Cup for Best Actor; The Third Man (1949), alongside Welles; and Niagara (1953). One of his final films was Michael Cimino's Heaven's Gate (1980).

Film critics and media outlets have cited him as one of the best actors never to have received an Academy Award nomination.

== Early life ==
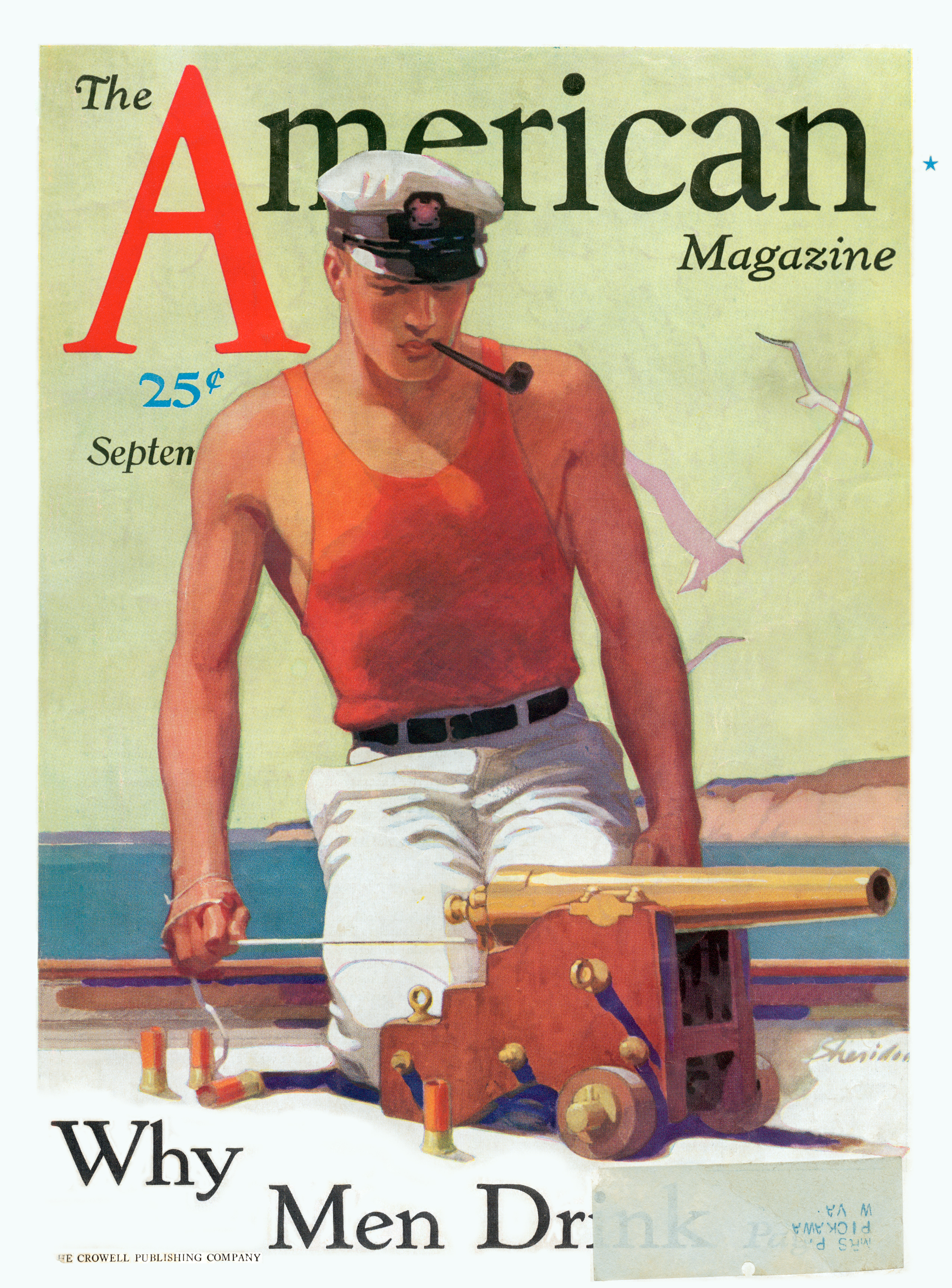
Joseph Cotten modeled for The American Magazine (September 1931)

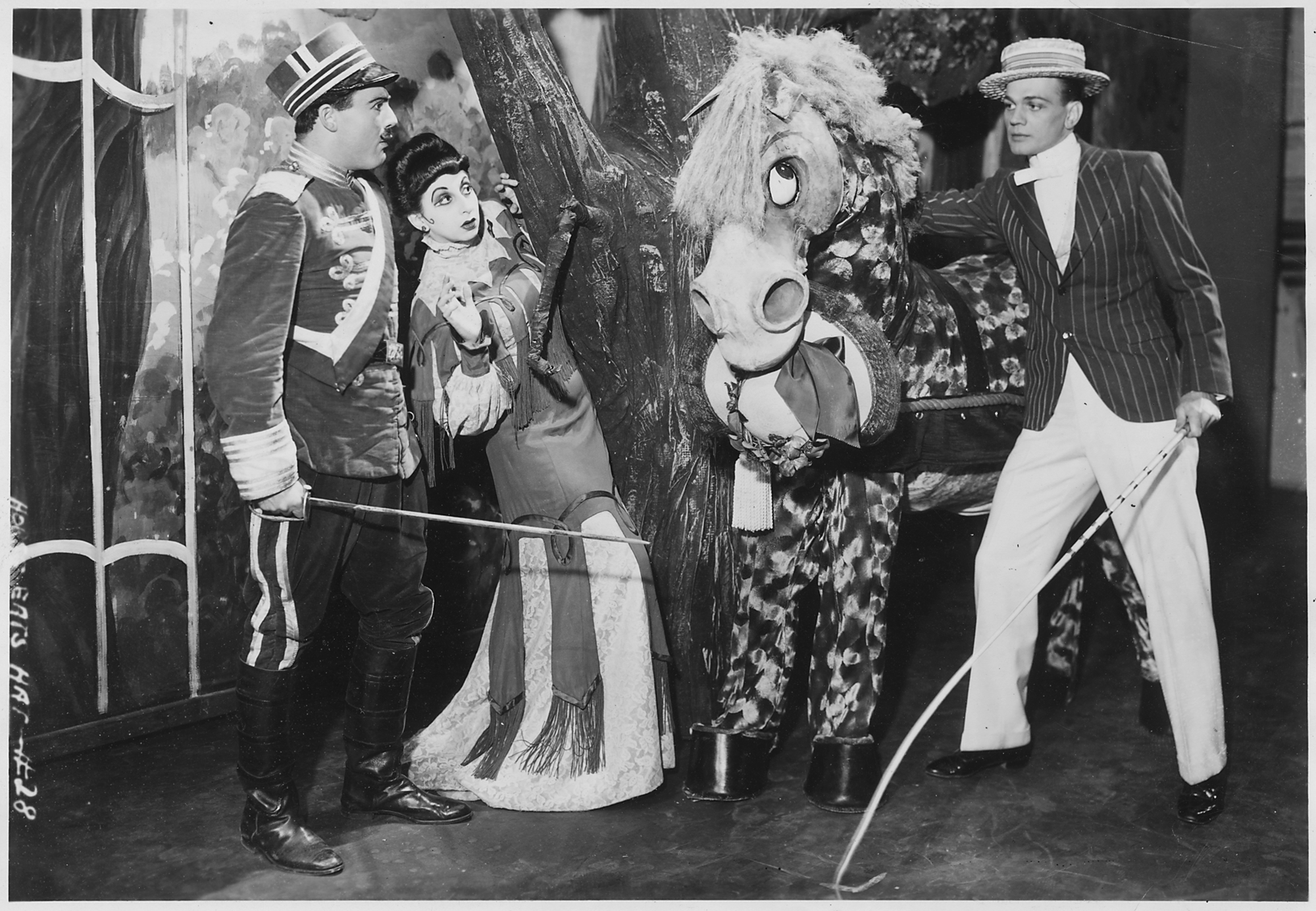
Cotten in Horse Eats Hat (1936)

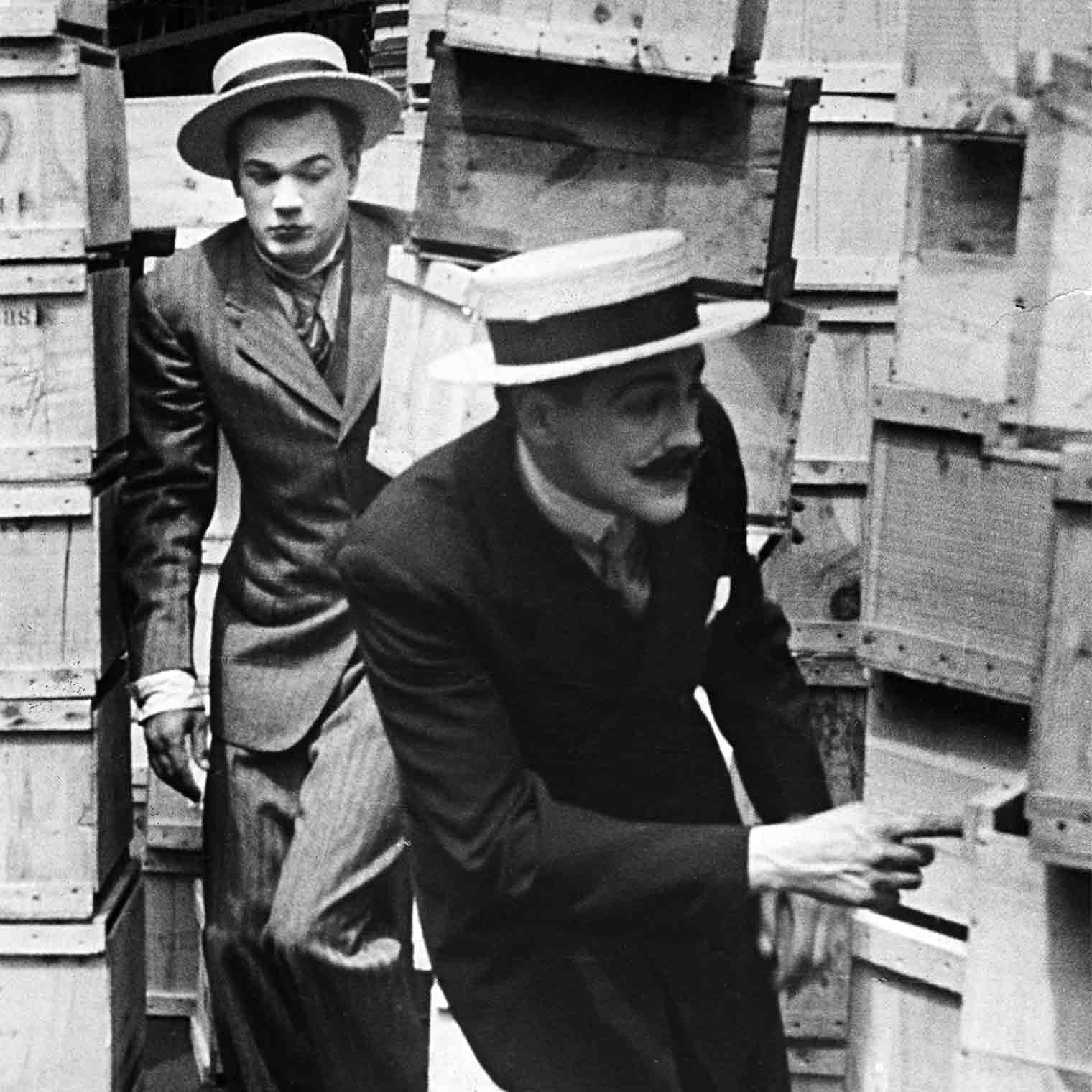
Cotten and Edgar Barrier during the shooting of film sequences for the stage production Too Much Johnson (1938)

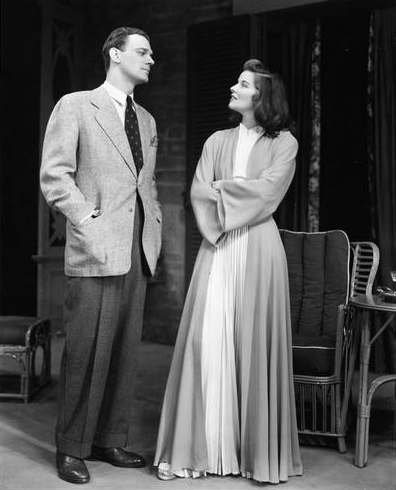
Cotten and Katharine Hepburn on Broadway in The Philadelphia Story (1939)

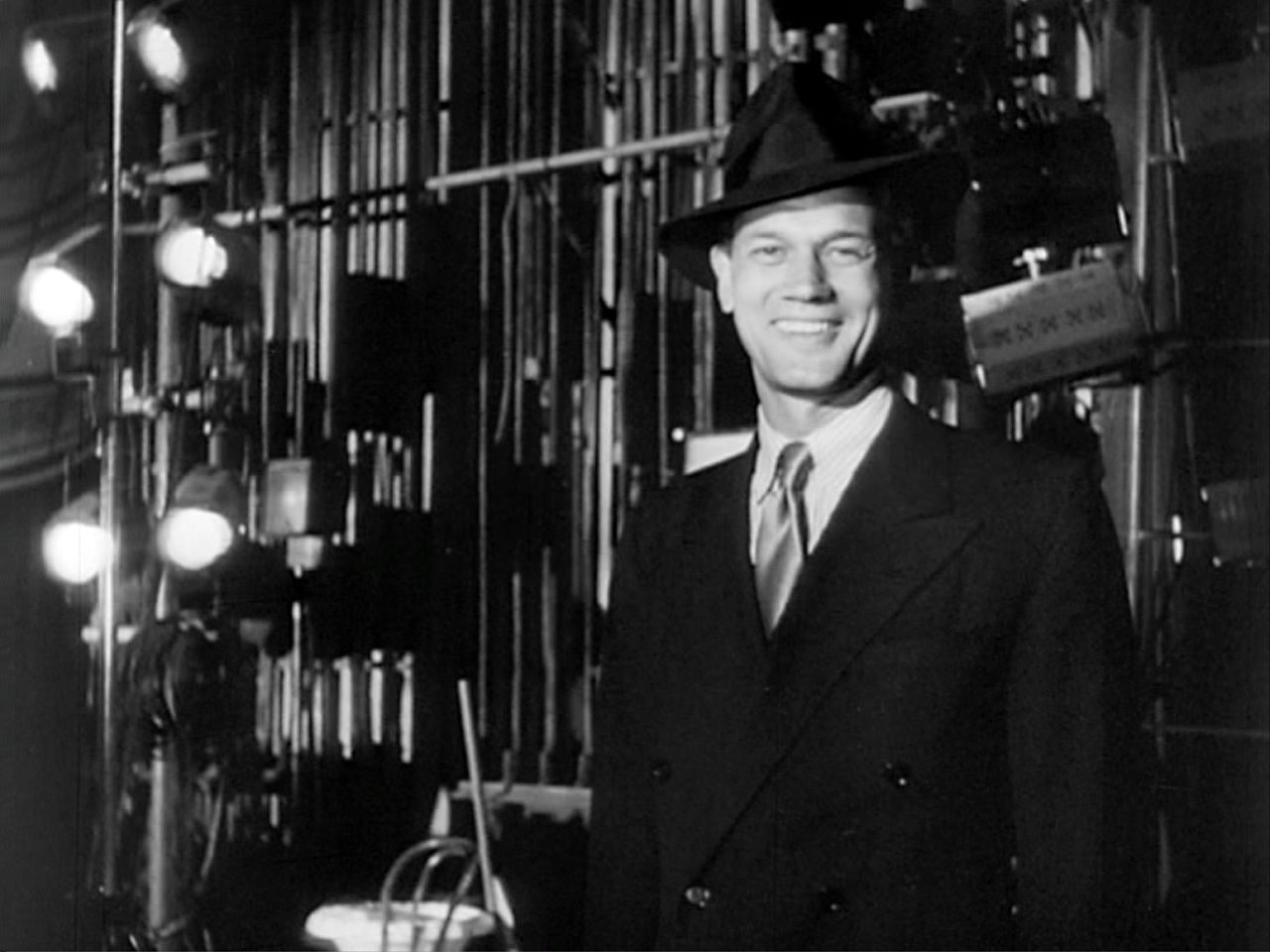
Cotten is introduced in the trailer for Citizen Kane (1941).

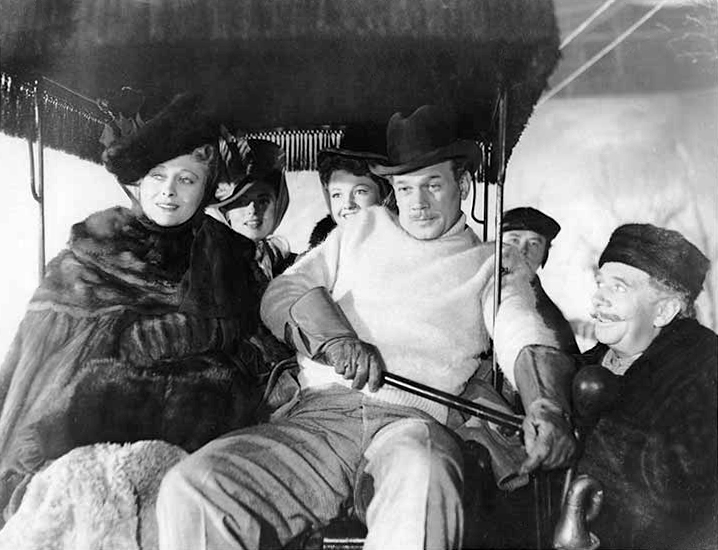
Dolores Costello, Agnes Moorehead, Anne Baxter, Cotten, Tim Holt and Ray Collins in The Magnificent Ambersons (1942)

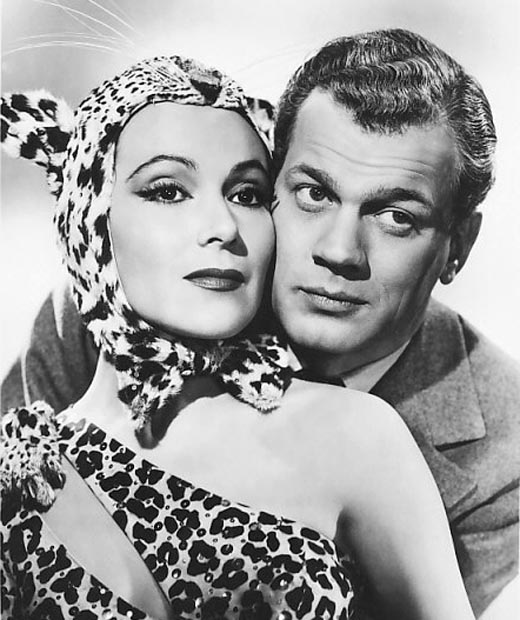
Cotten and Dolores del Río in Journey into Fear (1943)

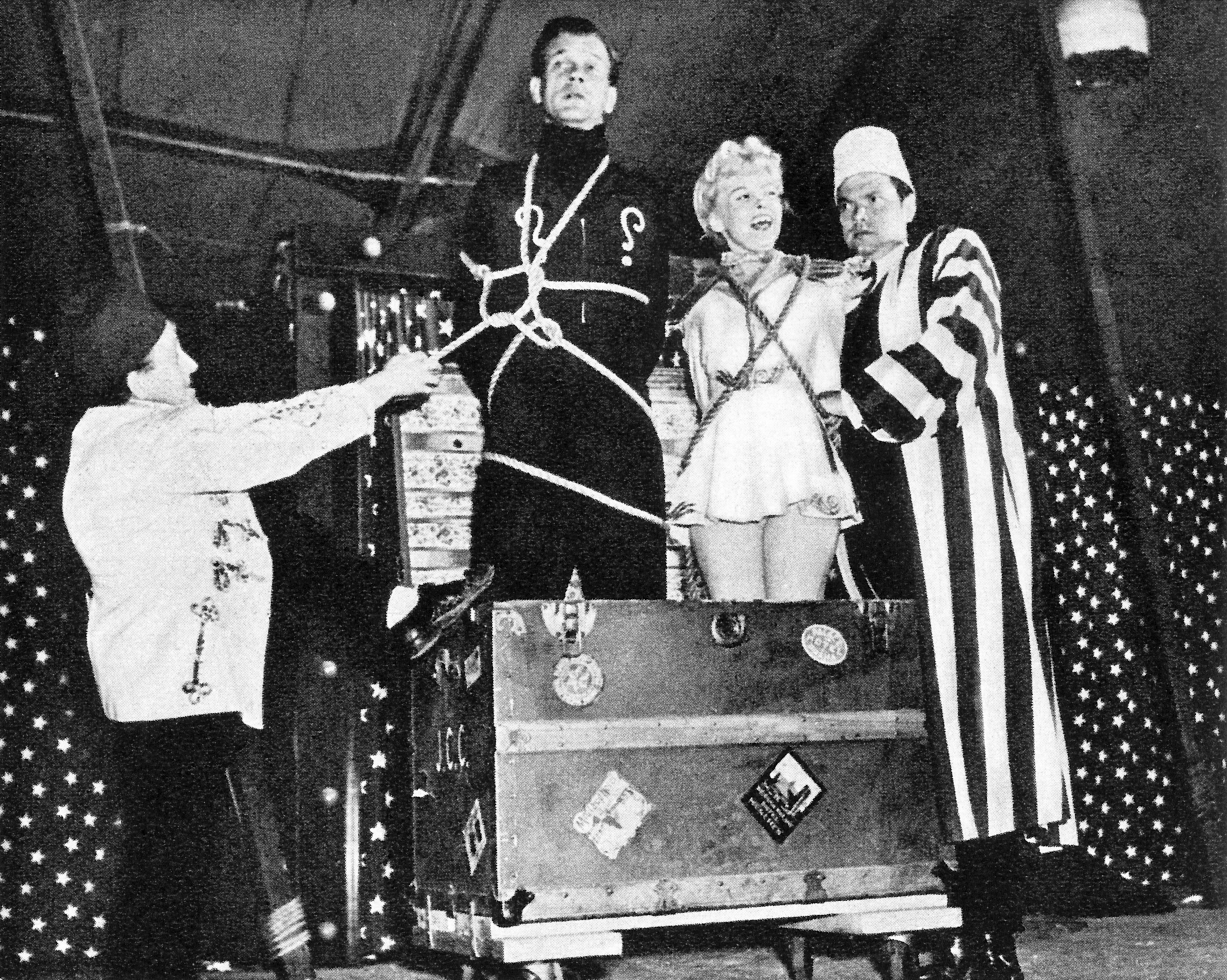
George (Shorty) Chirello, Cotten, assistant Eleanor Counts and Orson Welles in The Mercury Wonder Show (1943)

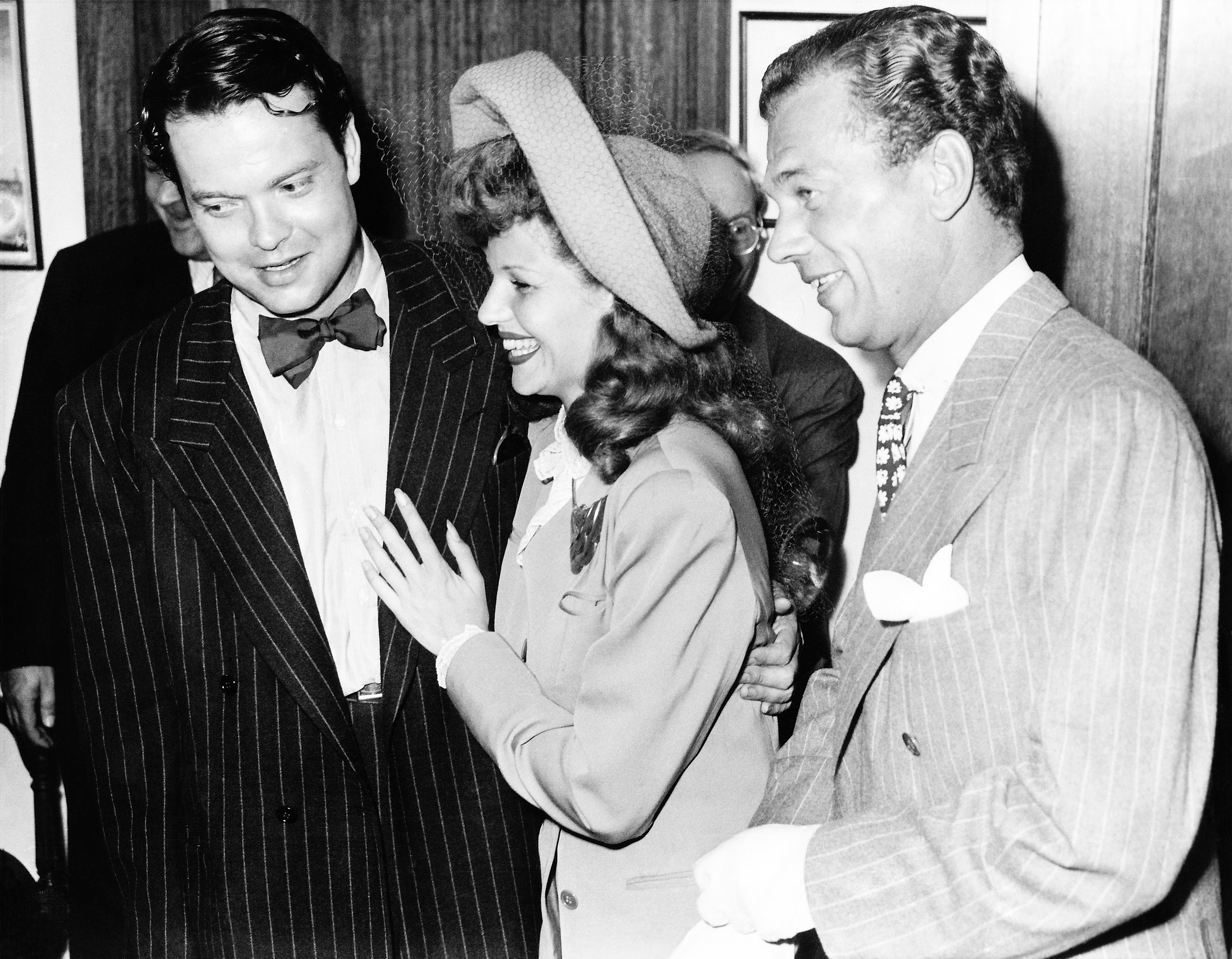
Wedding of Orson Welles and Rita Hayworth, with best man Cotten (September 7, 1943)

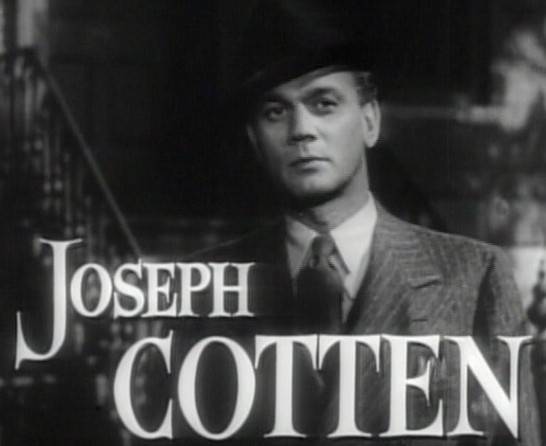
Cotten in Shadow of a Doubt (1943)

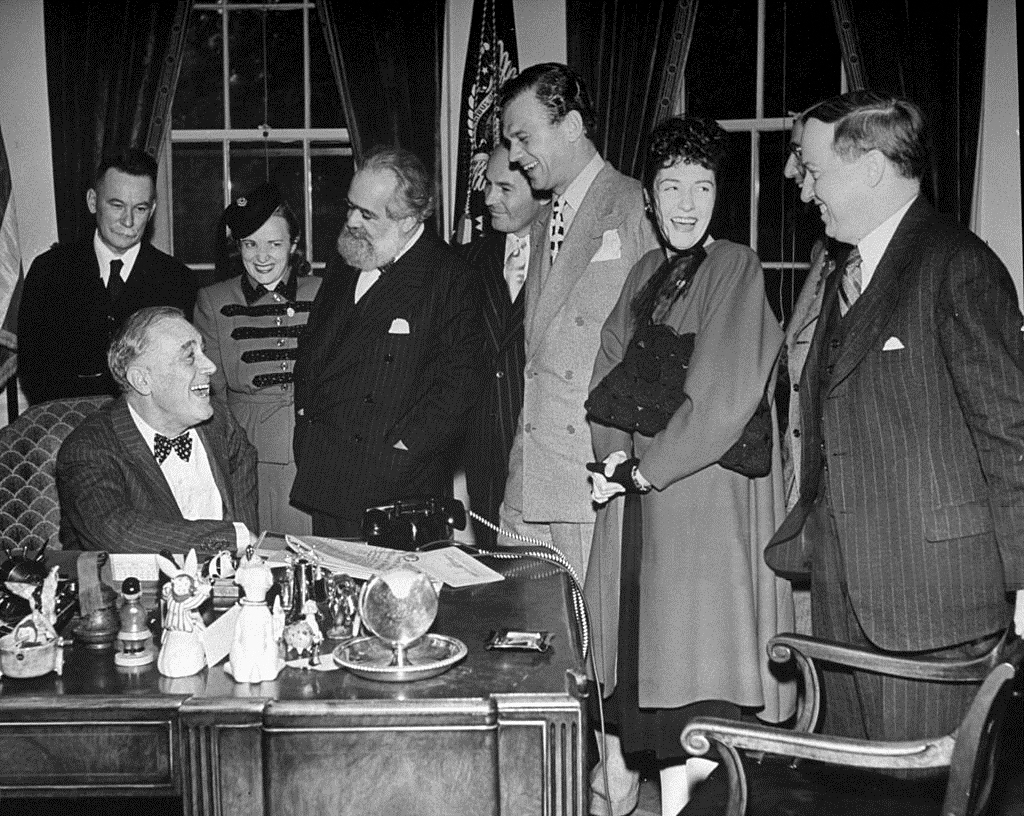
Members of the Independent Voters Committee of the Arts and Sciences for Roosevelt visit FDR at the White House (October 1944). From left: Van Wyck Brooks, Hannah Dorner, Jo Davidson, Jan Kiepura, Cotten, Dorothy Gish, Dr. Harlow Shapley

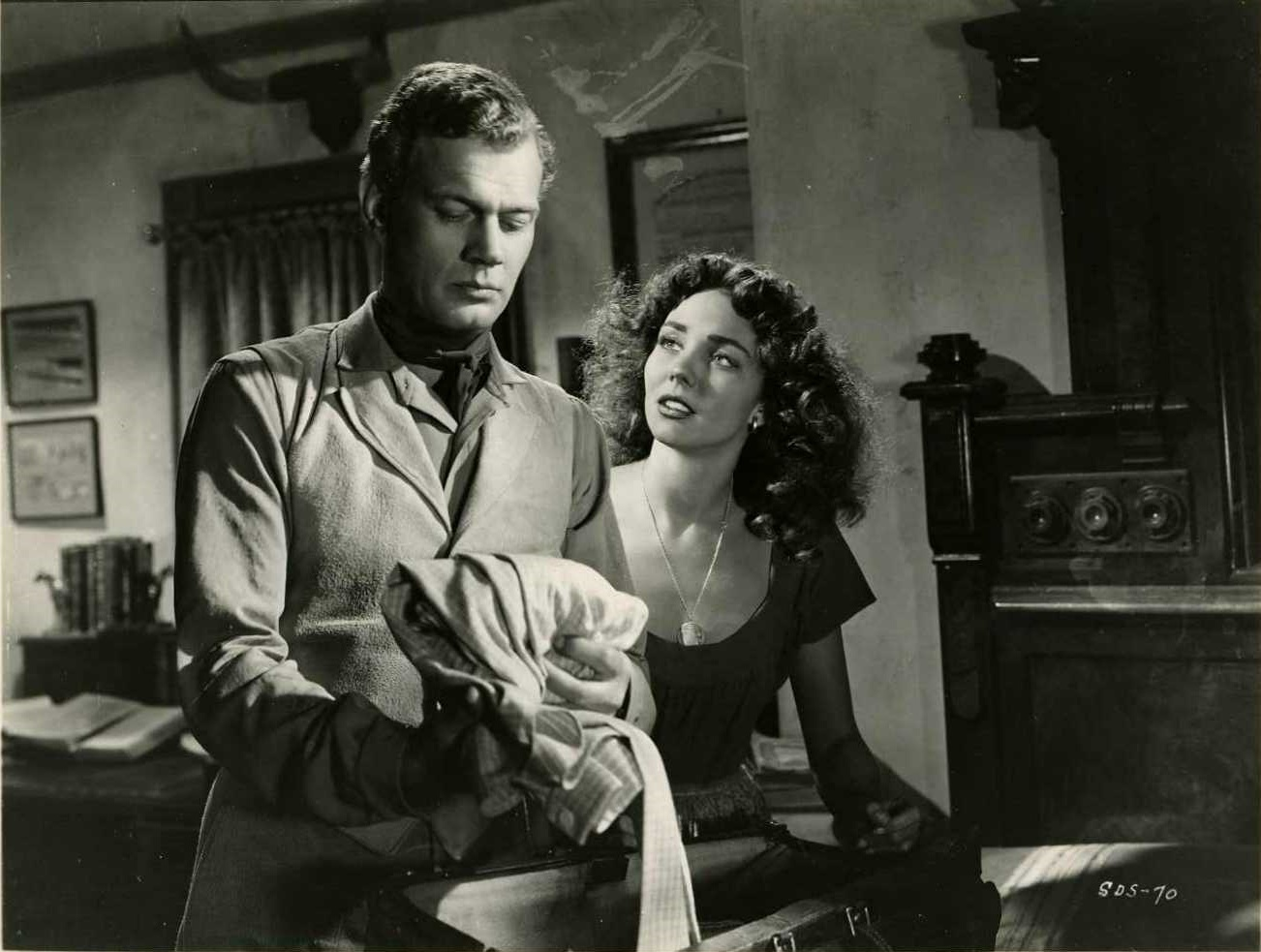
Cotten and Jennifer Jones in Duel in the Sun (1946)

Joseph Cheshire Cotten Jr. was born on May 15, 1905, in Petersburg, Virginia, United States, the first of three sons born to Joseph Cheshire Cotten Sr., an assistant postmaster, and Sally Willson Cotten. He had two brothers, Whitworth W. "Whit" and Samuel W. Cotten. Both were engineers. Cotten grew up in the Tidewater region and showed an aptitude for drama and a gift for storytelling.

In 1923, when Cotten was 18, his family arranged for him to receive private lessons at the Hickman School of Expression in Washington, D.C., and underwrote his expenses.

Cotten earned spending money playing professional football on Sundays, for $25 a quarter. After graduation, he earned enough money as a lifeguard at Wilcox Lake to pay back his family's loan, with interest. He moved to Miami in 1925 and worked as an advertising salesman for The Miami Herald at $35 a week. He started performing at the Miami Civic Theatre, and worked there for five years, also reviewing the shows for the Herald.

Cotten served in the First Motion Picture Unit of the U.S. Army Air Forces during World War II.

== Career ==
=== 1932–1939: Broadway and film debuts ===
Cotten moved to New York and worked for David Belasco as an assistant stage manager. He was an understudy to Melvyn Douglas in Tonight or Never, then succeeded Douglas in the lead role for the Copley Theatre in Boston, where he worked on and performed in over 30 plays. Cotten struggled to find work during the Depression, so he turned to modeling through the Walter Thornton Model Agency and acted in industrial films. He also performed on radio. Cotten made his Broadway debut in 1932 in Absent Friends which ran for 88 performances. He followed it with Jezebel (1933), staged by Katherine Cornell and Guthrie McClintic, which only had a short run. He was in Loose Moments which ran for 8 performances.

In 1934, Cotten met and became friends with Orson Welles, a fellow cast member on CBS Radio's The American School of the Air. Welles regarded Cotten as a brilliant comic actor, and gave him the starring role in his Federal Theatre Project farce, Horse Eats Hat (September 26 – December 5, 1936). Cotten was sure that Horse Eats Hat won him the notice of his future Broadway co-star, Katharine Hepburn. Cotten said Welles later told him "You're very lucky to be tall and thin and have curly hair. You can also move about the stage without running into the furniture. But these are fringe assets, and I'm afraid you'll never make it as an actor. But as a star, I think you well might hit the jackpot."

In 1937, Cotten became an inaugural member of Welles's Mercury Theatre company, starring in its Broadway productions Caesar as Publius; it ran for 157 performances. He followed it with The Shoemaker's Holiday (1938) and Danton's Death (1938) for Welles. Cotten also performed in radio dramas presented on The Mercury Theatre on the Air and The Campbell Playhouse. That same year Cotten made his film debut in the Welles-directed short, Too Much Johnson (1938), a comedy that was intended to complement the aborted 1938 Mercury stage production of William Gillette's 1894 play. The film was never screened in public and was lost until 2008 (and then screened in 2013 at the Pordenone Silent Film Festival).

Cotten returned to Broadway in 1939, creating the role of C. K. Dexter Haven opposite Katharine Hepburn's Tracy Lord in the original production of Philip Barry's The Philadelphia Story. The play ran for 417 performances at the Shubert Theatre, and in the months before its extensive national tour a film version was to be made by MGM. Cotten went to Hollywood, but discovered there that his stage success in The Philadelphia Story translated to, in the words of his agent Leland Hayward, "spending a solid year creating the Cary Grant role." Hayward suggested that they call Cotten's good pal, Orson Welles. "He's been making big waves out here", Hayward said. "Maybe nobody in Hollywood ever heard of the Shubert Theatre in New York, but everybody certainly knows about the Mercury Theatre in New York."

=== 1940–1949: Leading film roles ===
==== Citizen Kane (1941) ====
After the success of Welles's War of the Worlds 1938 Halloween radio broadcast, Welles gained a unique contract with RKO Pictures. The two-picture deal promised full creative control for the young director below an agreed budget limit, and Welles's intention was to feature the Mercury Players in his productions. Shooting had still not begun on a Welles film after a year, but after a meeting with writer Herman J. Mankiewicz Welles had a suitable project.

In mid-1940, filming began on Citizen Kane, portraying the life of a press magnate (played by Welles) who starts out as an idealist but eventually turns into a corrupt, lonely old man. The film featured Cotten prominently in the role of Kane's best friend Jedediah Leland, eventually a drama critic for one of Kane's papers.

When released on May 1, 1941, Citizen Kane – based in part on the life of newspaper magnate William Randolph Hearst– did not do much business at theaters; Hearst owned numerous major newspapers, and forbade them to carry advertisements for the film. Nominated for nine Academy Awards in 1942, the film won only for Best Screenplay, for Mankiewicz and Welles. Citizen Kane launched the film careers of the Mercury Players, including Agnes Moorehead (who played Kane's mother), Ruth Warrick (Kane's first wife), and Ray Collins (Kane's political opponent). However, Cotten was the only one of the four to find major success as a lead in Hollywood outside of Citizen Kane; Moorehead and Collins became successful character film actors. Moorehead starred in Bewitched and Warrick spent decades in a career in daytime television, specifically All My Children.

The Los Angeles Times, in an otherwise mixed review of the film, said that "Cotten's work is vital and distinctive ... He is an important 'find.'" Alexander Korda hired him to play Merle Oberon's leading man in Lydia (1941). "I didn't care about the movies, really", Cotten said later. "I was tall. I had curly hair. I could talk. It was easy to do."

==== The Magnificent Ambersons (1942) ====
Cotten starred in Welles's adaptation and production of The Magnificent Ambersons (1942). After the commercial disappointment of Citizen Kane, RKO was apprehensive about the new film, and after poor preview responses, cut it by nearly an hour before its release. Though at points the film appeared disjointed, it was well received by critics. Despite the critical accolades Cotten received for his performance, he was again snubbed by the academy.

==== Journey into Fear (1943) ====
Cotten was cast in the World War II spy thriller Journey into Fear (1943) based on the novel by Eric Ambler. It was originally scripted by Ben Hecht but Welles, who was supervising, disliked it, and rewrote it with Cotten. Released by RKO, the Mercury production was directed by Norman Foster. It was a collaborative effort due to the difficulties shooting the film and the pressures related to Welles' imminent departure to South America to begin work on It's All True.

Alfred Hitchcock cast Cotten as a charming serial killer in Shadow of a Doubt (1943). It was made for Universal Pictures, for whom Cotten then appeared in Hers to Hold (1943), as Deanna Durbin's leading man.

After Welles's return, he and Cotten co-produced The Mercury Wonder Show for members of the U.S. armed services. Opening August 3, 1943, the all-star magic and variety show was presented in a tent at 9000 Cahuenga Boulevard in Hollywood. Featured were Welles (Orson the Magnificent), Cotten (Jo-Jo the Great), Rita Hayworth (forced to quit by Columbia Pictures boss Harry Cohn and replaced by Marlene Dietrich), Agnes Moorehead (Calliope Aggie) and others. Tickets were free to servicemen, and more than 48,000 of them had seen show by September 1943.

In late 1943, Cotten visited Welles's office and said that producer David O. Selznick wanted to make two or three films with him, but that he wanted him under his own contract. Welles then tore up Cotten's contract with Mercury Productions, saying, "He can do more for you than I can. Good luck!" Cotten signed a long-term deal with Selznick. Selznick loaned out Cotten and Ingrid Bergman to MGM for the thriller Gaslight (1944), which was a major hit. Selznick then put Cotten in the wartime drama Since You Went Away (1944) alongside Claudette Colbert, Jennifer Jones and Shirley Temple, which was another major success.

Selznick followed this up by teaming Cotten with Ginger Rogers and Temple in I'll Be Seeing You (1945), another melodrama. Hal Wallis borrowed Cotten and Jones to make Love Letters (1945). Exhibitors voted him the 17th most popular star in the United States in 1945. Selznick used Cotten, Jennifer Jones and Gregory Peck in Duel in the Sun (1946), an epic Western that was hugely popular at the box office.

Dore Schary, who had worked for Selznick, went to run RKO and hired Cotten for The Farmer's Daughter (1947), where he was Loretta Young's leading man. Cotten then made Portrait of Jennie (1948) for Selznick, co starring with Jones; Cotten played a melancholy artist who becomes obsessed with a girl who might have died many years before. His performance won Cotten the International Prize for Best Actor at the 1949 Venice International Film Festival.

==== The Third Man (1949) ====
Cotten was reunited with Welles in Carol Reed's The Third Man (1949), produced by Korda and Selznick. Cotten portrays a writer of pulp fiction who travels to postwar Vienna to meet his friend Harry Lime (Welles). When he arrives, he is told that Lime has died. Determined to prove to the police that his friend was murdered, he uncovers an even darker secret. (Note: Welles and Cotten remained close friends until Welles's death in 1985. According to Welles, Cotten was always uncomfortable as a leading man and preferred to play supporting or character roles.) Years later, Cotten would recall that "Orson Welles lists Citizen Kane as his best film, Alfred Hitchcock opts for Shadow of a Doubt, and Sir Carol Reed chose The Third Man – and I'm in all of them."

Cotten then reunited with Hitchcock and Ingrid Bergman in Under Capricorn (1949) as an Australian landowner with a shady past; it was a box office disappointment. So too was Beyond the Forest (1949) with Bette Davis at Warner Bros.

=== 1950–1969: Established actor ===
Cotten co-starred with Joan Fontaine in September Affair (1950) for Hal Wallis. Selznick loaned him to 20th Century Fox for the dark Civil War Western Two Flags West (1950), then to RKO for Walk Softly, Stranger (1950, shot in 1948) which reunited him with Alida Valli from The Third Man. It was a flop. At Fox he did Half Angel (1951) with Young, then did another with Wallis at Paramount, Peking Express (1951) and went to MGM for The Man with a Cloak (1951) with Barbara Stanwyck. He had a cameo in Welles' Othello (1951).

Cotten did a Western at Universal, Untamed Frontier (1953), during the filming of which he was injured. He did a thriller for Andrew L. Stone, The Steel Trap (1952), which reunited him with Teresa Wright from Shadow of a Doubt. At Fox he was in the Marilyn Monroe vehicle Niagara (1953), after James Mason turned down the role. He narrated Egypt by Three (1953) and was reunited with Stone in A Blueprint for Murder (1953).

On the stage in 1953, Cotten created the role of Linus Larrabee Jr. in the original Broadway production of Sabrina Fair, opposite Margaret Sullavan. The production ran from November 11, 1953, until August 21, 1954, and was the basis of the Billy Wilder film Sabrina, which starred Humphrey Bogart and Audrey Hepburn. He and Sullavan appeared in a TV production of State of the Union for Producers' Showcase, directed by Arthur Penn.

Cotten made Special Delivery (1955) in West Germany and appeared in a TV adaptation of Broadway for The Best of Broadway (1955), directed by Franklin J. Schaffner. He appeared in episodes of several TV anthology series, a popular format of the era, including Celebrity Playhouse, The Ford Television Theatre, Star Stage, Alfred Hitchcock Presents (three episodes) and General Electric Theater.

In 1955, Cotten hosted The 20th Century Fox Hour on television. In 1956, he introduced and occasionally starred in his own anthology NBC series, On Trial. Because it was popularly known as The Joseph Cotten Show, it was retitled mid-run to The Joseph Cotten Show: On Trial. It ran for 41 episodes through 1959, with Cotten appearing in at least 20.

He returned to features with The Bottom of the Bottle (1956), The Killer Is Loose (1957) and The Halliday Brand (1957). He guest-starred on Jane Wyman Presents The Fireside Theatre, Telephone Time, Playhouse 90, Schlitz Playhouse, Zane Grey Theater, Suspicion and Westinghouse Desilu Playhouse. He made a cameo appearance in Welles's Touch of Evil (1958) and a starring role in the film adaptation of Jules Verne's From the Earth to the Moon (1958). Cotten had another success on Broadway when he appeared in Once More, With Feeling (1958–60), which ran for 263 performances. For the third time, Cotten was in a Broadway hit but did not reprise his role in the film version; Yul Brynner played the part on screen.

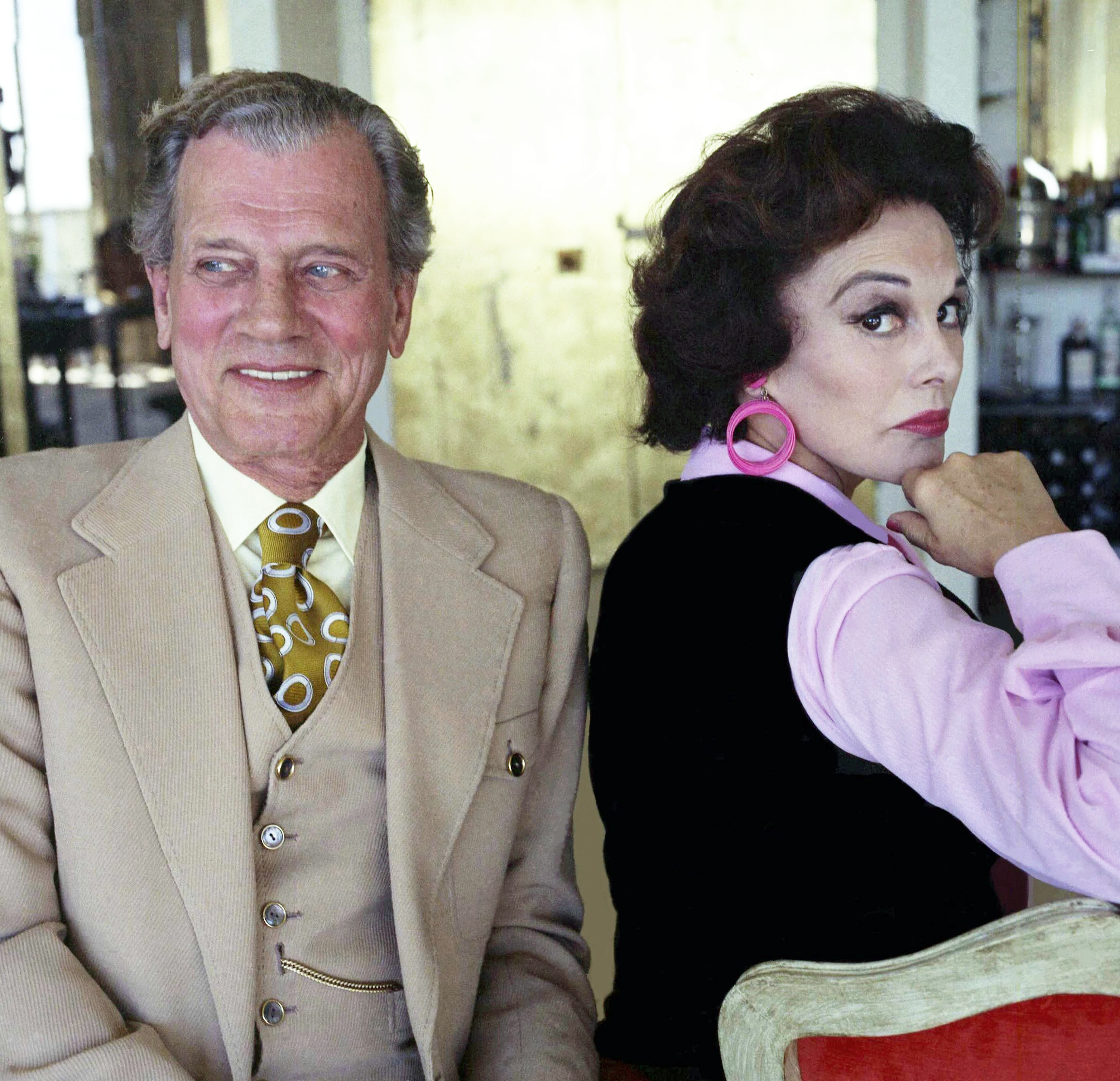
Cotten and Patricia Medina in 1973

Cotten had a supporting role in the films The Angel Wore Red (1960) and The Last Sunset (1961), and guest-starred on The DuPont Show with June Allyson, Checkmate, The Barbara Stanwyck Show, Bus Stop, Theatre '62 (an adaptation of Hitchcock's Notorious), Dr. Kildare, Wagon Train and Saints and Sinners.

Cotten returned to Broadway to appear in Calculated Risk (1962–63), which ran for 221 performances and meant he had to turn down a role in a film Harrigan's Halo. He guest starred on The Great Adventure and 77 Sunset Strip and appeared in the pilot for Alexander the Great (1963).

After some time away from film, Cotten returned in the horror classic Hush...Hush, Sweet Charlotte (1964) for Aldrich, with Bette Davis, Olivia de Havilland and Agnes Moorehead. Cotten was top billed in The Great Sioux Massacre (1965) and The Tramplers (1965), Brighty of the Grand Canyon (1966), The Cruel Ones (1967), Some May Live (1967) and Gangsters '70 (1968). He took supporting roles in The Money Trap (1965) and The Oscar (1966).

He guest starred on Cimarron Strip, Ironside and Journey to the Unknown and had a support role in Jack of Diamonds (1967). He had the lead in White Comanche (1968) and Latitude Zero (1969) (shot in Japan with his wife) and supported in the TV movies The Lonely Profession (1969) and Cutter's Trail (1970). He also appeared as himself on the Rowan & Martin's Laugh-In (1968) variety show.

=== 1970–1981: Later and final roles ===
Cotten appeared in The Name of the Game, It Takes a Thief, NET Playhouse, The Grasshopper (1970), Tora! Tora! Tora!, The Virginian, Assault on the Wayne (1971), Do You Take This Stranger? (1971), City Beneath the Sea (1971), The Abominable Dr. Phibes (1971), Lady Frankenstein (1971) and The Screaming Woman (1972) with de Havilland.

He had lead roles in Doomsday Voyage (1972), Baron Blood (1972), and The Scopone Game (1973) and was in The Devil's Daughter (1973), The Streets of San Francisco, Soylent Green (1973), A Delicate Balance (1973), The Rockford Files, Syndicate Sadists (1975), The Timber Tramps (1975), The Lindbergh Kidnapping Case (1976), A Whisper in the Dark (1976), Origins of the Mafia (1976), Twilight's Last Gleaming (1977) for Aldrich, Airport '77, Aspen (1977), The Hardy Boys/Nancy Drew Mysteries, Last In, First Out (1978), Caravans (1978), The Perfect Crime (1978), Island of the Fishmen (1979), Concorde Affaire '79 (1979), Guyana: Cult of the Damned (1979), Churchill and the Generals (1979), Tales of the Unexpected and Fantasy Island.

Cotten later admitted, "I was in a lot of junk. I get nervous when I don't work."

Cotten's final performances include in George Bower's supernatural horror film The Hearse (1980), the ABC television movie Casino (1980), Michael Cimino's Heaven's Gate (1980), multiple episodes of The Love Boat (1981), The Survivor (1981), shot in Australia and Delusion (1981).

== Personal life ==
Cotten married Lenore Kipp in 1931. She died of leukemia in early 1960. He adopted Kipp's daughter, Judith Lenore LaMonte, from Kipp's previous marriage. He married British actress Patricia Medina on October 20, 1960, in Beverly Hills at the home of David O. Selznick and Jennifer Jones. He bought a historic 1935 home in the Mesa neighborhood of Palm Springs, California, where he and his wife lived from 1985 to 1992.

In 1961, Cotten was admitted to the Society of the Cincinnati in North Carolina based on his descent from Captain Hudson Whitaker, Seventh Regiment, North Carolina Continental Line. He held Captain Whitaker's hereditary seat until his death in 1994.

=== Illness and death ===
On June 8, 1981, Cotten experienced a heart attack followed by a stroke that affected his brain's speech center. He began years of therapy that restored his ability to speak. As he began to recover, he and Welles talked on the phone each week for hours.

In 1990, Cotten's larynx was removed because of cancer. He died on February 6, 1994, of pneumonia at the age of 88. He was buried at Blandford Cemetery in Petersburg, Virginia.

== Accolades and legacy ==
At the 10th Venice International Film Festival, Cotten was awarded the Volpi Cup for Best Actor for his performance in the film Portrait of Jennie (1948). He was also given a star on the Hollywood Walk of Fame in 1960.

Cotten was portrayed by Tim Robbins in the 1985 TV film Malice in Wonderland, by James Tupper in the film Me and Orson Welles (2008) and by Matthew Glave in the television series Feud (2017), which depicts the filming of Hush...Hush, Sweet Charlotte.
