= Cry Terror! =

1958 American thriller film

- Theatrical release lobby card
- Directed by: Andrew L. Stone
- Screenplay by: Andrew L. Stone
- Produced by: Andrew L. Stone; Virginia L. Stone
- Starring: James Mason; Inger Stevens; Rod Steiger; Neville Brand
- Cinematography: Walter Strenge
- Edited by: Virginia L. Stone
- Music by: Howard Jackson
- Production company: Andrew L. Stone Productions
- Distributed by: Metro-Goldwyn-Mayer
- Release date: May 2, 1958 (United States)
- Running time: 96 minutes
- Country: United States
- Language: English
- Budget: $482,000
- Box office: $1,020,000

Cry Terror! (aka The Third Rail) is a 1958 American crime thriller film starring James Mason, Inger Stevens, and Rod Steiger. The story was written and directed by Andrew L. Stone. The film also features Neville Brand, Jack Klugman and Angie Dickinson in supporting roles.

== Plot ==
Paul Hoplin is a criminal mastermind with a sophisticated blackmail scheme. He intends to extort $500,000 ransom by threatening to blow up a crowded airliner using an explosive device that electronics expert Jim Molner has unwittingly designed for him.

Hoplin calls giant 20th Century Airlines and tells them there is a bomb aboard one of their flights, then he and his gang take Molner, wife Joan and young daughter Patty hostage.

The plane lands safely and a bomb squad finds and disarms the powerful miniature device - just as intended, as Hoplin was only using the incident as proof of his ability to plant one anywhere without prior detection. He now intends to do it again and collect for real.

FBI agents gather in New York with airline representatives. Hoplin calls in another threat. Joan is forced to go alone to collect the ransom, while two of Hoplin's accomplices, a beautiful but hardened young mistress, Kelly, and yes-man Vince, guard her husband and child in a mid-town penthouse apartment.

Hoplin and Steve, the gang’s “muscle”, a benzedrine-addicted ex-con with a history of sexual assaults on women, hide out in a house in Riverdale, Bronx. With her husband and child’s lives in the balance, Joan barely makes it there with the money to beat Hoplin's deadline. She is then left alone with Steve. Forced to defend herself against an assault, she kills him with a shard of broken glass.

Hoplin then relocates the pair to a new hideout in lower Manhattan. Joan is reassured that her husband and daughter are still alive by speaking to them on the phone. Using dental records for Kelly, the FBI identifies her, then closes in on the group at her apartment. They wound Kelly and disarm Vince in a brief shootout.

Acting on her own, Joan makes a break for it and runs for her life. She darts into the nearest subway station. When Hoplin pursues her onto the tracks she falls and he steps on a third rail and is electrocuted. An oncoming train stops in time to avoid crushing her just as the police arrive.

== Cast ==
- James Mason as Jim Molner
- Inger Stevens as Joan Molner
- Rod Steiger as Paul Hoplin
- Neville Brand as Steve
- Angie Dickinson as Eileen Kelly
- Kenneth Tobey as Agent Frank Cole
- Jack Klugman as Vince
- Jack Kruschen as F.B.I. Agent Charles Pope
- Carleton Young as Roger Adams
- Barney Phillips as Dan Pringle
- Harlan Warde as Bert
- Ed Hinton as Operative
- Chet Huntley as himself
- Roy Neal as himself
- Jonathan Hole as Airline Executive
- William Schallert as Henderson
- Terry Ann Ross as Patty Molner

== Production ==
According to a February 1957 news item in The Hollywood Reporter, the film's original plot centered on a bomb extortionist being trapped in a subway.

The production was shot under the working title of The Third Rail from early August to early September 1957, in locations in Los Angeles and New York City. For James Mason, the picture marked a transition from playing male leads to character parts.

== Reception ==
=== Box office ===
According to MGM records, Cry Terror! made $340,000 in the US and Canada and $680,000 elsewhere, resulting in a profit of $538,000.

Has been shown on the Turner Classic Movies show 'Noir Alley' with Eddie Muller.

=== Critical ===
The New York Times film critic Bosley Crowther was highly critical, calling the film a "pallid" thriller for low-brow audiences that relied on clichés and cheap thrills:

"People who have a particularly low and permissive frightening point may get a few chills from "Cry Terror," which came to the Victoria yesterday. For this strictly-for-kicks melodrama, which Andrew and Virginia Stone have made on an undisguised low budget for Metro-Goldwyn-Mayer, is full of the sort of fast arm-twisting and menacing of innocent people with senseless perils that passes for ruthless realism among those patrons who don't like to use their heads."

Ozus critic Dennis Schwartz was not able to suspend his disbelief in his 2005 review of Cry Terror!:

"Director-writer Andrew L. Stone presents an ill-conceived attempt at making a realistic thriller about a mad bomber extorting money in a terrorist plot via the 1950s. There are too many implausible occurrences for the narrative to handle and it all falls by the tracks in the climactic hysterical underground subway chase scene, which yields to Hollywood melodrama ... Unfortunately the story lacked the kind of tension it needed throughout and there were too many coincidences and contrived plot points to sustain interest."
