= The Secret of My Success (1965 film) =

1965 British film by Andrew L. Stone

- Film poster by Frank Frazetta
- Directed by: Andrew L. Stone
- Written by: Andrew L. Stone
- Produced by: Andrew L. Stone; Virginia L. Stone
- Starring: James Booth; Shirley Jones; Stella Stevens; Honor Blackman; Lionel Jeffries
- Cinematography: Davis Boulton
- Edited by: Noreen Ackland
- Music by: Lucien Cailliet; João Baptista Laurenco; Derek New; Roland Shaw; Christopher L. Stone
- Distributed by: Metro-Goldwyn-Mayer (MGM)
- Release dates: 3 November 1965 (United States); 20 December 1965 (United Kingdom)
- Running time: 112 minutes
- Country: United Kingdom
- Language: English

The Secret of My Success is a 1965 British black comedy film from American writer-director Andrew L. Stone, starring James Booth, Shirley Jones, Stella Stevens, Honor Blackman, and Lionel Jeffries (in four roles).

A police constable solves two high-profile cases with help from his mother. He becomes the leader of a South American country through becoming the figurehead of its revolution. The new leader later inherits millions from an earl, but makes the mistake of naming his mother as his heir. His mother kills him to get the inheritance.

== Plot ==
Thanks to his mother's help, Arthur Tate somehow makes a remarkable rise from a lowly constable to the ruler of a South American country.

His story begins with Inspector Hobart's investigation into dressmaker Violet Lawson's missing husband. Hobart suspects foul play and digs up Violet's cellar, looking for the body. Violet did indeed kill her spouse, but does not bury the corpse there until after Hobart has dug the hole. A helpful tip from Arthur's mum makes him the hero who solves the case.

Baron von Lukenberg is then arrested for creating a species of deadly spiders. But it is actually his wife, the Baroness, who is responsible. Arthur, with his mum's aid, once again saves the day. President Esteda of the South American nation of Guanduria is so favorably impressed, he hires Arthur to be his personal liaison.

Marigold Marado turns up, telling Arthur she wants to make a film about his heroism. What he does not know is that Marigold is a revolutionary who hopes to overthrow Esteda's government. The film she ends up creating inadvertently turns Arthur into a great revolutionary hero, and it is he who becomes Guanduria's new leader.

Arthur can do no wrong. The Earl of Aldershot learns of his great deeds and leaves Arthur 15 million pounds in his will. Arthur goes back to England to the earl's mansion to collect, intending to give all the money away to charity, but leaving it to his mother in case of his death. She blows up the mansion with her son in it.

== Cast ==
- Shirley Jones as Marigold Marado
- Stella Stevens as Violet Lawson
- Honor Blackman as Lily, Baroness von Lukenberg
- James Booth as Arthur Tate
- Lionel Jeffries as Insp. Hobart / Baron von Lukenberg / The Earl of Aldershot / President Esteda
- Richard Vernon as Lord Hetherby
- Amy Dalby as Mrs. Tate

== Critical reception ==
The Monthly Film Bulletin wrote: "It is a sad fact that since setting up headquarters in England, the Stone team seems to have lost most of its freshness and technical audacity. This new film harks back in some ways to the Ealing comedies (Lionel Jeffries plays four bizarre roles, rather well backed by a host of wacky minor characters), but it is essentially a one-joke idea, and the three glamorous leading ladies who are never quite what they seem wouldn't have fooled anyone. Although its full potential is not worked out, the third story has its moments, notably Shirley Jones stopping in mid-conversation to sing the Guandurian national anthem, and some comic business in a theatre involving an ill-rehearsed flying ballet. As is customary with the Stones, almost everything is shot on location (this time in a variety of luscious baronial halls), but the treatment is very anonymous: the sooner they get back to forest fires and train wrecks the better."

British film critic Leslie Halliwell said: "Flabby portmanteau comedy full of in-jokes and flat-footed farce; satire is not evident."

The New York Times described the film as a "lengthy, busy but largely unfunny mélange of comedy and melodrama."

Filmink called it "one of several films post-Zulu that failed to turn James Booth into a star."

Sky Movies wrote that the film was a "pleasing comedy", and noted, "Lionel Jeffries does a mini-Alec Guinness by playing four parts."

The Radio Times Guide to Films gave the film 2/5 stars, writing: "Yet another in the seemingly endless parade of lacklustre British comedies, this features James Booth as a naive, garrulous mother's boy who starts the film as a PCand ends up unwittingly helping to overthrow a foreign dictator, becoming a hero in the process. The film owes much to Voltaire's Candide but it's just not very funny, though Booth is worth watching, and Lionel Jeffries gets to play four roles."
