= The Night Holds Terror =

1955 American film by Andrew L. Stone

- Theatrical release poster
- Directed by: Andrew L. Stone
- Written by: Andrew L. Stone
- Produced by: Andrew L. Stone
- Starring: Jack Kelly; Vince Edwards; John Cassavetes
- Cinematography: Fred Jackman Jr.
- Edited by: Virginia L. Stone
- Music by: Lucien Cailliet
- Production company: Columbia Pictures
- Distributed by: Columbia Pictures
- Release date: July 13, 1955 (United States)
- Running time: 86 minutes
- Country: United States
- Language: English

Theatrical trailer

The Night Holds Terror is a 1955 American crime film noir based on a true incident, written and directed by Andrew L. Stone and starring Vince Edwards, John Cassavetes and Jack Kelly.

== Plot ==
Gene Courtier, an employee of North American at Edwards AFB, stops his car on the way home for hitchhiker Victor Gosset, a wanted criminal and member of a gang of three robbers headed by Robert Batsford and new addition Luther Logan. When the gang discovers that Courtier only has a few dollars in cash, they threaten to kill him but instead concoct a plan to force him to sell his car and surrender the money to them. But because the auto dealer cannot pay such a large sum so late in the day, the gang leaves with Courtier and retreats to the family home in a suburban neighborhood. The gang's plan is to spend the night there, accompany Courtier in the morning to collect his money and then flee.

The gang terrorizes Courtier, his wife Doris and their two young children over the course of the night. In the morning, Courtier and the gang successfully collect the money from the auto dealer. Before Courtier can be murdered on a desert turnoff, Logan, who does not want to be involved in murder, first tells Courtier to get ready to make a run for it if they take the turnoff, then comes up with the idea that they instead hold him for ransom because his father owns a chain of stores. He tells Courtier that this will give him a better chance to escape. Batsford demands $200,000. Courtier's father is given one night to obtain the large sum.

Courtier's wife calls the police, who begin to trace the gang's phone calls. The hoodlums take Courtier to their expensive hillside hideout, and behind the scenes the police work feverishly to determine their location. There is friction within the gang, and when Courtier and Logan attempt to escape, Batsford shoots Logan dead and recaptures Courtier.

Doris stalls the gang on the phone line long enough for a successful trace to be performed. The police swarm the area, and a shootout occurs near a phone booth in a deserted industrial area, Batsford and Gossett are wounded and Courtier is safely reunited with his wife.

== Cast ==
- Jack Kelly as Gene Courtier
- Hildy Parks as Doris Courtier
- Vince Edwards as Victor Gosset
- John Cassavetes as Robert Batsford
- David Cross as Luther Logan
- Eddie Marr as Captain Cole
- Jack Kruschen as Detective Pope
- Joyce McCluskey as Phyllis Harrison
- Jonathan Hale as Bob Henderson
- Barney Phillips as Stranske
- Roy Neal as TV Newsreader
- Joel Marston as Reporter
- Guy Kingsford as Police Technician
- Stanley Andrews as Mr. Courtier (uncredited)
- Charles Herbert as Steven Courtier (uncredited)
- Barbara Woodell as Mrs. Osmond (uncredited)
- William Woodson as Narrator (uncredited)

== Production ==
The crime that became the basis of The Night Holds Terror occurred on February 13, 1953. Eugene M. Courtier was an Edwards Air Force Base technician, and the kidnapping took place on a Lancaster, California highway. The sale of Courtier's car also took place in Lancaster. The criminals, Leonard Daniel Mahan, James Bartley Carrigan and Don Eugene Hall, were tried and convicted. During the trial, Mahan requested but was denied a mistrial because the judge failed to instruct the jury to disregard any description of an incident in which Courtier and his father physically attacked Mahan in the courtroom in the absence of the jury.

The account of the actual crime lacks most of the dramatics of the overnight hostage situation at the Courtier home in the film and suggests that the Courtiers were under far less force and coercion than portrayed in the film. The record does not mention any gunfight or violence during the kidnappers' apprehension of Courtier and occupation of his home.

== Reception ==
In a contemporary review for The New York Times, critic Howard Thompson wrote: "If Andrew Stone's 'The Night Holds Terror' is far from memorable, the ingenious writer-director-producer must be accorded a bright green light for what he has accomplished in this tight, economical and steadily suspenseful little picture. Certainly most of the cards are stacked against it. The familiar plot, for instance, has three murderous hoodlums invading the home of a nice young couple, with the expected panic and the usual hairbreadth hostage kidnapping at the end. Most of the cast are entirely unknown, except on television. And from start to finish, the picture remains a bare-handed, low-budget entry. The plucky Mr. Stone simply rolls up his sleeves and makes the most of what he has, with only a couple of mistakes."

== See also ==
- The Desperate Hours, a similar 1955 film
- List of American films of 1955
- List of films featuring home invasions
