= Never Put It in Writing =

1964 British film by Andrew L. Stone

- Directed by: Andrew L. Stone
- Written by: Andrew L. Stone
- Produced by: Andrew L. Stone; Virginia L. Stone
- Starring: Pat Boone; Milo O'Shea; Fidelma Murphy; Reginald Beckwith
- Cinematography: Martin Curtis
- Edited by: Noreen Ackland
- Music by: Frank Cordell
- Production companies: Andrew L. Stone Productions; Seven Arts Associated
- Distributed by: Allied Artists Pictures
- Release date: 1964
- Running time: 93 minutes
- Country: United Kingdom
- Language: English

Never Put It in Writing is a 1964 British comedy film directed and written by Andrew L. Stone and starring Pat Boone, Milo O'Shea, Fidelma Murphy and Reginald Beckwith.

== Plot ==
While in Ireland, an insurance executive learns that somebody else has been promoted over his head. He writes an abusive letter to his bosses, only to discover that he is to be given another important post with the company. He desperately tries to recover the letter before it reaches his bosses.

== Cast ==
- Pat Boone as Steven Cole
- Milo O'Shea as Danny O'Toole
- Fidelma Murphy as Katie O'Connell
- Reginald Beckwith as Lombardi
- Harry Brogan as Mr. Breeden
- Nuala Moiselle as Miss Bull
- John Le Mesurier as Adams
- Sarah Ballantine as Adams' secretary
- Polly Adams as receptionist
- Colin Blakely as Oscar
- Ed Devereaux as Pringle
- John Dunbar as judge
- Bill Foley as tower man
- John Gardiner as security officer
- Karal Gardner as young woman
- Seamus Healy as sorting office foreman
- Liz Lanchbury as Basil's girlfriend
- John Lynch as man at elevator
- Julia Nelson as maid
- Derry Power as taxi driver
- Susan Richards as judge's wife

== Production ==
The film was originally known as The Letter, with Pat Boone's signing announced in June 1963. It was to be produced for Seven Arts-MGM (eventually it would be made for Seven Arts-Allied Artists). It was also known as Strictly Personal.

Filming began in Dublin, Ireland, in July 1963. The schedule was for two months.

=== Accident ===
On the first day of shooting at Shannon Airport, a plane crashed in a camera and the director's van, injuring seven people, one of them seriously. A CL44 plane was taking off while a Proctor plane was taxiing on the runway. The Proctor went off the runway and crashed into the camera van (It was later ruled that the probably cause of the accident was the loss of control by the Proctor due to the effect of the slipstream caused by the C44.)

Andrew Stone and his wife were among those with minor injuries. Pat Boone was not involved in the accident; he arrived in the country shortly afterwards. Questions were asked in the Dail over the incident.

Filming continued in Dublin for a number of weeks, with scenes shot at Dublin Airport, the Gresham Hotel, the Irish Life Building, Jury's Hotel and the Andrew Street Post Office. However, the government refused permission for any further low flying sequences. In August, the unit moved to London to complete the film.

== Release ==
The world premiere was held at the Adelphi Theatre in Dublin.

== Reception ==
The Monthly Film Bulletin wrote: "On the evidence of their recent British films, it looks as if the Stones are in danger of joining that long line of American filmmakers who have come a cropper in Europe. The new film disappoints on various levels: true, it has all the familiar Stone location work, with lots of tracking through office blocks and crowded streets, but nowhere is there the kind of sparkle and go which characterises their best American work. But the main trouble is the script. Here we have all the old Irish jokes about bureaucratic government employees, hard drinkers and quaint old men, with scarcely a good line to go round."

Variety wrote: "Boone turns in a creditable performance as the hotshot insurance agent. The girl with whom he plays post office is Fidelma Murphy of the Abbey, a pretty colleen who tends to overemote. The outstanding participant is Milo O'Shea, who's a delight as a devious, opportunistic "friend" of Boone's."

Diabolique magazine said "This is a sluggish, underwritten effort.. the sort of movie that needed songs and color to compensate for the script. It has neither. Boone's performance is fine."
