= Julie (1956 film) =

1956 film by Andrew L. Stone

- Theatrical release poster
- Directed by: Andrew L. Stone
- Written by: Andrew L. Stone
- Produced by: Martin Melcher
- Starring: Doris Day; Louis Jourdan; Barry Sullivan; Frank Lovejoy
- Cinematography: Fred Jackman Jr.
- Edited by: Virginia L. Stone
- Music by: Leith Stevens, Tom Adair, Leonard Pennario
- Production company: Arwin Productions
- Distributed by: Metro-Goldwyn-Mayer
- Release date: October 17, 1956 (United States)
- Running time: 99 minutes
- Country: United States
- Language: English
- Budget: $785,000
- Box office: $2.6 million

Julie is a 1956 American thriller starring Doris Day, Louis Jourdan, Barry Sullivan, and Frank Lovejoy. Produced by Day's own Arwin Productions, it is one of the earliest recognized stalker films. Both written and directed by Andrew L. Stone, the picture received two Academy Award nominations, for Best Original Screenplay and Best Song.

The film is among the earliest to feature the subplot of a flight attendant piloting an aircraft to safety, later used in Airport 1975 (1975) and parodied in Airplane! (1980). Julie is also notable for being technically accurate in its use of contemporary aviation technology.

== Plot ==
Julie Benton is terrorized by her insanely-jealous husband, concert pianist Lyle. He threatens to kill her if she ever tries to leave him, and he nearly does by forcing the accelerator of their car to the floor while Julie frantically weaves along the tortuous curves of a Pacific Coast road.

When she turns to her friend Cliff Henderson, Julie is confronted more strongly than ever with his suspicions that her first husband's presumed suicide was actually murder.

Seeking to lure Lyle into confessing, Julie draws him out with anxious pillow talk. He does, and she spends a miserable night in his arms, just waiting for daylight and the opportunity to escape.

She does, but Lyle is hot on her heels. Local police are unable to help her, as no documentable crime has been committed by Lyle against Julie, and she has no corroborating witness for his confession. She then flees to San Francisco, her former home, with Cliff's help. Police there are also hamstrung, but are much more aware of the very real danger Julie may be in, thanks to the busy crime blotter of a big city, and one of their own having had his wife murdered by an ex-husband in a similar case of unrelenting jealousy.

Still stalked by Lyle, Julie abandons every vestige of their life together, adopts a new identity, and gets back her job as a flight attendant for Amalgamated Airlines. Stationed in New York, she must still make the occasional cross-country flight. On her first one back to San Francisco. she bunks in for the night with a fellow flight attendant, believing that she will be safe in her anonymity.

Pretending to be a friend of Cliff's, Lyle tricks an operator with his company into revealing that Cliff is planning a rendezvous with a friend in San Francisco that night. He lies in wait along Cliff's path back to the city from his job and trails his car. Cliff realizes he's being followed and stops and confronts Lyle. After forcing Cliff at gunpoint to agree to drive to Julie's, Cliff leaps out of the car, but Lyle shoots him, then rifles his pockets for Julie's address.

Julie is contacted by Amalgamated and told that she must change plans and head straight to the airport for a flight back to New York as a fill-in. A gravely wounded Cliff manages to get word to the police that Lyle knows where Julie is, but before he can relay to them where she is staying, he becomes unconscious.

Piecing his clues together, they eventually find the right apartment, but too late to head off Julie. Lyle learns of Julie's flight and goes straight to the airport.

With police at a loss to locate him, Julie is warned that he may be on her flight. She spots him and informs the flight crew, but Lyle follows her into the cockpit, pulls a gun, and kills the pilot. He then seriously wounds the co-pilot before being killed by him. With the help of a doctor on board, the co-pilot is able to coach Julie between blackouts. Eventually he falls unconscious, and Julie is "talked down" to the ground by the control tower, saving the lives of 60 passengers - and her own.

Lyle is dead and Cliff is not. Breaking into tears, she is overwhelmed by all that has happened, and all that lies ahead to right her life.

== Cast ==
- Doris Day as Julie Benton
- Louis Jourdan as Lyle Benton
- Barry Sullivan as Cliff Henderson
- Frank Lovejoy as Det. Lt. Pringle
- Jack Kelly as Jack (co-pilot)
- Ann Robinson as Valerie
- Pamela Duncan as Peggy
- Barney Phillips as Doctor on Flight 36
- Jack Kruschen as Det. Mace
- John Gallaudet as Det. Sgt. Cole
- Carleton Young as Airport Control Tower Official
- Hank Patterson as Ellis
- Ed Hinton as Captain of Flight 36
- Harlan Warde as Det. Pope
- Aline Towne as Denise Martin
- Eddie Marr as Airline Official
- Joel Marston as Garage Mechanic
- Mae Marsh as Hysterical Passenger

== Production ==
The movie's working title was If I Can't Have You. Stone's signing was announced in January 1956.

Arwin Productions was the production firm recently formed by Day and her husband Martin Melcher.

The aircraft in Julie were Douglas R5D-1/3 Skymaster four-engined cargo and passenger airliners from Transocean Air Lines, a charter company based at Oakland International Airport, (San Francisco). (Note: Transocean Air Lines pilots Bill Keating and Royal Minson taught Doris Day to handle the four-engined aircraft's controls in a realistic way to bring down to a safe landing.)

The soundtrack includes music by three composers: the Academy Award-nominated title song Julie was written by Leith Stevens and Tom Adair; and both the picture's thematic backbone, the instrumental "Midnight on the Cliffs", and the piano composition "Dream Rhapsody", by pianist/composer Leonard Pennario. The latter is based on themes taken directly from the Symphony in D minor by César Franck.

== Reception ==
=== Box office ===
According to MGM records, Julie earned $1,415,000 in the US and Canada and $1,185,000 elsewhere resulting in a profit of $604,000.

=== Critical response ===
In its review, New York Times critic Bosley Crowther panned the film, writing, "Let's say the whole thing is contrivance and the acting is in the same vein. Miss Day wrings her hands and looks frantic not so much because she feels it as because she gets her cues." Of Andrew Stone's direction, Crowther went on to say, "...it is quite clear that Mr. Stone set out to keep the heroine under menace all the way, no matter how coldly calculated or improbable that might be."

The contemporary Washington Evening Star summed up the film as "a movie that leaves audiences more in the debt of the cameraman and Andrew Stone's freewheeling direction than anyone else....Quite irrationally, most of the way, it relates the story of a freckled blond girl who discovers she has married a lethally jealous concert pianist. This chap...is one with whom a girl could be relaxed only on a desert island where she would meet no other male, including a barracuda."

Aviation film historian Stephen Pendo in his 1985 book Aviation in the Cinema described Julie as a "minor film."

In 2005 film critic Dennis Schwartz, gave Julie a mixed review, writing, "Improbable crime thriller about a woman-in-peril, that is too uneven to be effective; the banal dialogue is the final killer. ... Doris Day, to her credit, gives it her best shot and tries to take it seriously even when the melodrama moves way past the point of just being ridiculous. Later disaster movies stole some of those airplane landing scenes."

Also in 2005 Julie was listed in Golden Raspberry Award founder John Wilson's book The Official Razzie Movie Guide as one of the "100 Most Enjoyably Bad Movies Ever Made".

Julie has been shown on the Turner Classic Movies show 'Noir Alley' with Eddie Muller.

=== Accolades ===
| Award | Category | Nominee(s) | Result | Ref. |
|---|---|---|---|---|
| Academy Awards | Best Screenplay – Original | Andrew L. Stone | Nominated | |
| Academy Awards | Best Song | "Julie"; Music by Leith Stevens; Lyrics by Tom Adair | Nominated | |

== See also ==
- List of American films of 1956
