= Confidence Girl =

1952 film by Andrew L. Stone

- Theatrical release poster
- Directed by: Andrew L. Stone
- Screenplay by: Andrew L. Stone
- Story by: Andrew L. Stone
- Produced by: Andrew L. Stone
- Starring: Tom Conway; Hillary Brooke; Eddie Marr; John Gallaudet; Jack Kruschen; Dan Riss; Walter Kingsford
- Cinematography: William H. Clothier
- Edited by: Virginia L. Stone
- Music by: Lucien Cailliet
- Production company: Andrew L. Stone Productions
- Distributed by: United Artists
- Release date: June 20, 1952
- Running time: 81 minutes
- Country: United States
- Language: English

Confidence Girl is a 1952 American crime film written and directed by Andrew L. Stone and starring Tom Conway and Hillary Brooke. It was released on June 20, 1952 by United Artists.

== Plot ==
Confidence trickster Roger Kingsley convinces the Los Angeles police that, acting as an insurance company's investigator, he can help them apprehend the notorious swindler Mary Webb. Kingsley sets a trap at a department store and nabs Webb as she steals an expensive fur coat. While the store detective is contacting police, Kingsley allows Webb, who is actually his girlfriend, to escape. However, Kingsley has gained the trust of the police.

In a second scam, Webb and Kingsley bilk several thousand dollars from a pawnshop owner. Webb then prepares for their biggest scam yet, a stage act at a swank nightclub in which she will pose as a clairvoyant. Her psychic powers amaze audiences, but the act is just an elaborate ruse.

The suspicious police set a trap and Webb is tricked into confessing her scam in front of the club's entire audience. She and Kingsley are taken into custody.

== Cast ==
- Tom Conway as Roger Kingsley
- Hillary Brooke as Mary Webb
- Eddie Marr as Johnny Gregg
- John Gallaudet as Detective Chief Brownell
- Jack Kruschen as Detective Sergeant Quinn
- Dan Riss as Detective Lieutenant Fenton
- Walter Kingsford as Mr. Markewell
- Paul Livermore as Hal Speel
- Aline Towne as Peggy Speel
- Helen Van Tuyl as Maggie
- Edmund Cobb as Detective Lieutenant Cobb
- Truman Bradley as Narrator
- Leo Cleary as Mr. Sheridan
- Roy Engel as Store Detective Walsh
- Charles Collins as Charlie
- Yvonne Peattie as Gertrude Palmer
- Joel Allen as Frank Palmer
- Helen Chapman as Joey Ridgway
- John Phillips as Allen Ridgeway
- Margo Karen as Hilda
- Bruce Edwards as 1st Detective
- Tyler McVey as 2nd Detective
- Paul Guilfoyle as William Pope
- Michael Vallon as Richard Downs
- Barbara Woodell as Miss Seabury
- Madge Crane as Mrs. Markwell
- Pamela Duncan as Braddock's Nurse
- Carmen Clothier as Fur Saleswoman
- Gil Frye as Nightclub Accomplice at Phone
- Duke York as Nightclub Accomplice with Binoculars
