= The Steel Trap =

1952 film by Andrew L. Stone

- Theatrical release poster
- Directed by: Andrew L. Stone
- Screenplay by: Andrew L. Stone
- Produced by: Bert E. Friedlob
- Starring: Joseph Cotten; Teresa Wright; Jonathan Hale
- Cinematography: Ernest Laszlo
- Edited by: Otto Ludwig
- Music by: Dimitri Tiomkin
- Production company: Thor Productions
- Distributed by: 20th Century-Fox
- Release date: November 12, 1952
- Running time: 85 minutes
- Country: United States
- Language: English
- Box office: $1 million (US rentals)

The Steel Trap is a 1952 American film noir written and directed by Andrew L. Stone and starring Joseph Cotten, Teresa Wright, and Jonathan Hale.

== Plot ==
With a million dollars cash in the vault, Jim Osborne, a long term bank employee who has advanced to assistant bank manager in Los Angeles, is tempted to steal from his own bank and flee the country. Doing research at the library, he learns that Brazil has no extradition treaty with the United States. If he steals the money at close of business on a Friday, he will have time to travel to Brazil before the theft is discovered on Monday's opening. But the season when the bank opens on Saturdays is about to begin, so he must take action the same week or else wait for months.

He tells his wife Laurie that the bank is sending him to Rio de Janeiro on business and he wants her and their daughter to travel with him. It is a great opportunity for his career, he says, and he has been given it in preference over the person who would normally be sent, so he cautions her not to talk to anyone about it. Laurie is delighted with the news, but insists their daughter stay at home with Laurie's mother. Jim decides he can send for her after Laurie knows they are staying in Rio.

With his inside knowledge and trusted position, the theft from the bank vault is simple enough, though time-sensitive and stressful; but the travel logistics are difficult. Because of the late timing the direct flights are full, and passports and visas are needed on a rush basis. The Osbornes face a series of issues and delays and ultimately miss a connection at New Orleans. At this point an airline employee, made suspicious by Jim's urgent manner and very heavy baggage, tips off a customs officer. Customs checks his baggage on the possibility he is illegally exporting gold, and the $1 million in cash is discovered.

Unreported large cash transactions are not illegal in 1952, but the customs man knows it is not normal for a bank to send only a single employee with so much cash on commercial travel. Though he suspects some wrongdoing, he cannot reach Jim's boss by telephone before the Osbornes' flight is called, and as there is no customs violation and Osborne threatens to sue him personally for his business losses, the officer lets them go. However, they are on standby and the flight is full and leaves without them. They will not be able to reach Rio on Sunday. Now fearing arrest, Jim checks into a hotel using a false name. Laurie hears the desk clerk call Jim by this other name and finally realizes the truth; she confronts him. When he admits what he has done, she wants no part in it; she leaves the hotel and flies back home to Los Angeles.

Within hours Jim realizes that his wife and daughter are far more important to him than his dreams of wealth. Laurie was too upset to tell anyone why she had suddenly returned. Jim calls her with a plan to return the money before the bank opens and as he has used only their money for the travel expenses the bank's money is intact. Jim flies back and just manages to replace the money in the vault before the bank opens. He is so emotionally drained that his fellow employees send him home sick where he reunites with Laurie.

== Cast ==
- Joseph Cotten as Jim Osborne
- Teresa Wright as Laurie Osborne
- Jonathan Hale as Tom Bowers
- Walter Sande as Customs Inspector
- Eddie Marr as Ken Woodley
- Carleton Young as Briggs, Airline Clerk
- Katherine Warren as Mrs. Kellogg
- Tom Powers as Valcourt, Travel Agent
- Stephanie King as Susan Osborne
- Aline Towne as Gail Woodley
- Hugh Sanders as Greer, Passport Clerk
- Marjorie Stapp as Travel Agent
- William Hudson as Raglin, Bank Teller #2

== Background ==
This was the second time that Cotten and Wright starred in a film together, following Alfred Hitchcock's Shadow of a Doubt (1943), in which she played his niece. Cotten was cast after visiting an osteopath and running into producer Bert Frielob, who sent him the script. Cotten agreed to make it.

The film was also known as Panic Stricken.

It was shot in two weeks, in the studio and in New Orleans, in April 1952.

Cotten also starred in A Blueprint for Murder (1953), with Jean Peters and Gary Merrill, a thriller noir also directed by Andrew L. Stone.

== Reception ==
When the film was released, The New York Times film critic Bosley Crowther offered qualified praise, writing, "The Steel Trap, which came to Loew's State yesterday, is a straight exercise in the build-up of cold, agonizing suspense ... As a purely contrived generation of runaway anxiety, this little melodrama amounts to a skillful and no-lost-motion job—so long as the innocent observer doesn't stop to think and check up. ... Indeed, it's an entertaining picture—the entertainment, however, being of the sort enjoyed by the man who hit himself on the head with a hammer because it felt so good when he stopped."

Variety magazine wrote of the film, "Andrew Stone's direction of his own story emphasizes suspense that is leavened with welcome chuckles of relief in telling the improbable but entertaining events."

Critic Leonard Maltin gives The Steel Trap two-and-a-half stars (out of four), terming it a "trim caper" film; and Spencer Selby's Dark City: The Film Noir calls it a "tense, realistic thriller."

Has been shown on the Turner Classic Movies show 'Noir Alley' with Eddie Muller.
