= The Decks Ran Red =

1958 American film by Andrew L. Stone

- Theatrical release poster
- Directed by: Andrew L. Stone
- Written by: Andrew L. Stone
- Produced by: Andrew L. Stone; Virginia L. Stone
- Starring: James Mason; Dorothy Dandridge; Broderick Crawford; Stuart Whitman; Katharine Bard
- Cinematography: Meredith M. Nicholson
- Edited by: Virginia L. Stone
- Music by: Philip Green
- Distributed by: Metro-Goldwyn-Mayer
- Release date: October 10, 1958 (U.S.)
- Running time: 84 minutes
- Country: United States
- Language: English
- Budget: $593,000
- Box office: $800,000

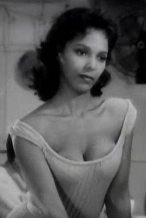
Dorothy Dandridge

The Decks Ran Red (also called Infamy) is a 1958 MGM American seagoing suspense drama film based on the book Infamy at Sea, and directed by Andrew L. Stone. The feature starred James Mason, Dorothy Dandridge, Broderick Crawford, and Stuart Whitman.

The film received generally poor reviews, but received wide viewership for Dorothy Dandridge's role. Filming took place in southern California aboard the Chios, Greece-registered SS Igor (originally the Philip C. Shera), a World War II Liberty Ship owned by the Los and Pezas shipowning families.

== Plot ==
When the captain of the merchant vessel S.S. Berwind dies, Ed Rummill is offered the job. He accepts, even as he is warned of recent problems aboard the ship, now moored at New Zealand. Those problems involve two of the ship's crew members, Henry Scott and Leroy Martin. The two have hatched an elaborate plot that includes a million-dollar payoff. They intend to anger the crew into mutiny, killing the officers (and eventually the rest of the crew) to make it appear they abandoned a sinking ship, thus leaving Scott in possession of a vessel which, according to maritime law, can be sold off for salvage value.

While still in port, the company's cook, along with two other seamen, have had enough of the Berwind and decide to jump ship. In order to replace them, Captain Rummill authorizes the hiring of a Maori cook and his young wife to work in the ship's galley as replacements. This turns out to be the new skipper's first mistake. The cook's wife is, to cite Rummill himself, "exotically beautiful." Scott decides to use the woman as a catalyst to stir up more animosity among the crew.

After the ship has sailed, however, the crew refuse to join Scott and Leroy's mutiny. Disappointed, the two retrieve a rifle and handgun they have smuggled aboard. They proceed to shoot 4 of their co-workers and secure the engine room for themselves. In a short time, Rummill and the officers realize no one in the engine room can be contacted. It also becomes apparent that the engine is slowing, due to the ship taking on water as part of Scott's plan to make it appear the crew abandoned a sinking ship. The captain orders that the crew not be informed of this. That way, they won't go for the lifeboats and risk being sniped at by the two muntineers. Meanwhile, a frustrated Scott uses his rifle to pick off additional crew members, starting with the ship's bridge and working his way down. Thus, will Ed Rummill's first command turn out to be his last? Or can he organize the officers and men, largely unarmed, to regain control of the vessel?

== Cast ==
- James Mason as Capt. Edwin Rummill
- Dorothy Dandridge as Mahia, Pete's Wife
- Broderick Crawford as Henry Scott, Mutineer
- Stuart Whitman as Leroy Martin, Scott's Accomplice
- Katharine Bard as Joan Rumill
- Jack Kruschen as Alex Cole
- John Gallaudet as "Bull" Pringle
- Barney Phillips as Karl Pope
- David R. Cross as Mace
- Hank Patterson as Mr. Moody
- Harry Bartell as Tom Walsh
- Joel Fluellen as Pete the Cook
- Guy Kingsford as Jim Osborne
- Jonathan Hole as Mr. Adams
- Harlan Warde as Vic
- Joel Marston as Russ Hendersen
- Ed Hinton as Mansard
- Marshall Kent as Sammy
- Robert Christopher as Seaman
- Art Lewis as Seaman

== Reception ==
According to MGM records the film earned $365,000 in the US and Canada and $435,000 elsewhere resulting in a loss of $273,000.
