= Hell's Headquarters =

1932 film

- Theatrical poster
- Directed by: Andrew L. Stone
- Written by: Norton S. Parker
- Produced by: Armand Schaefer; George W. Weeks
- Starring: Jack Mulhall; Barbara Weeks; Frank Mayo
- Cinematography: Jules Cronjager
- Edited by: Frank Atkinson
- Music by: Lee Zahler
- Production company: Action Pictures
- Distributed by: Mayfair Pictures
- Release date: May 15, 1932
- Running time: 63 minutes
- Country: United States
- Language: English

Hell's Headquarters is a 1932 American pre-Code "jungle adventure" film directed by Andrew L. Stone and starring Jack Mulhall, Barbara Weeks, and Frank Mayo. Set in contemporary Africa, it portrays the search by an American big-game hunter and others for a large and highly valuable cache of elephant ivory.

== Plot ==
Big-game hunter Ross King receives news in the United States that his longtime hunting partner, Jim Jessup, died suddenly of jungle fever back in Africa, in the Congo. At the same time, Phil Talbot, another American living in the Congo, writes to longtime friends Diane Cameron and her father about a stash of ivory that he will share with them if they invest $10,000 in an expedition to retrieve it. Once in Africa, Diane and her father meet Ross on a boat traveling up the Congo River. Initially, she is disturbed by the experienced hunter's disparaging remarks about Talbot, but soon she discovers that Talbot has indeed become a bitter and hostile man. While Talbot prepares his expedition into the jungle, Ross and Kuba confer on a plan to follow him and prove that he actually murdered Jessup after making him reveal the location of his and Ross's stash of ivory. Before their departure, however, Talbot learns from a native that he is suspected of killing Jessup, so he tries unsuccessfully to kill Ross. Later on the trek through the jungle, Diane is attacked by a leopard but is rescued by Ross, who is nearby shadowing the expedition. Ross now reveals himself to a nervous Talbot, demanding that he be allowed to lead the search. When they all finally arrive at the appointed location, Ross confronts Talbot once again and this time beats him until he finally confesses to murdering Jessup. Talbot escapes into the surrounding jungle, although he is killed there by a lion while Ross shows Diane and her father his coveted treasure of ivory.

== Cast ==
- Jack Mulhall as Ross King
- Barbara Weeks as Diane Cameron
- Frank Mayo as Phil Talbot
- Phillips Smalley as Mr. Cameron
- Fred Parker as Dr. Smith
- Everett Brown as Kuba

== Production ==
On February 10, 1932, while filming a jungle scene on set, Barbara Weeks was seriously injured by a leopard. The Boston Globe reported the day after the incident that the "trained" animal attacked the actress and clawed her left leg "as she walked past a tent in which [the leopard] was stationed." According to the newspaper, Weeks had been saved by Jack Mulhall and C. F. Broughton when they "seized the beast." In its issue of February 12, the trade paper The Film Daily also reports Weeks' injuries:

HOLLYWOOD—Barbara Weeks was badly clawed by a leopard at the Cliff Broughton studio while filming of a new picture was in progress. One of three leopards used in the scene became enraged and inflicted 13 deep wounds on Miss Week's leg before Jack Mulhall could beat it off with a cane.

== Bibliography ==
- Pitts, Michael R. Poverty Row Studios, 1929–1940: An Illustrated History of 55 Independent Film Companies, with a Filmography for Each. McFarland & Company, 2005.
