= Bedside Manner (film) =

1945 film by Andrew L. Stone

- Film poster
- Directed by: Andrew L. Stone
- Written by: Malcolm Stuart Boylan; Robert Carson; Frederick J. Jackson
- Produced by: Andrew L. Stone; Henry S. Kesler
- Starring: John Carroll; Ruth Hussey; Charles Ruggles; Ann Rutherford
- Cinematography: John J. Mescall; James Van Trees
- Edited by: James Smith
- Music by: Emil Newman
- Production company: Lysander Productions
- Distributed by: United Artists (original); Astor Pictures (re-release)
- Release date: June 14, 1945
- Running time: 72 minutes
- Country: United States
- Language: English
- Budget: $700,000 or $1 million

Bedside Manner is a 1945 American comedy film directed by Andrew L. Stone and starring John Carroll, Ruth Hussey, Charles Ruggles and Ann Rutherford. It is based on a 1944 Saturday Evening Post story of the same name by Robert Carson and was distributed by United Artists. The film was re-released in 1950 by Astor Pictures under the title Her Favorite Patient.

== Plot summary ==
Plastic surgeon Dr. Hedy Fredericks picks up three hitchhiking Marines, Tommy, Dick, and Harry (who all have Smith as their last name), while driving home to Chicago. On the way she makes a quick stop in her birth town of Blithewood, and is appalled by the way the town has changed since she left it years ago. The whole town now has a large defense plant with the population having grown dramatically.

Hedy runs into a man she believes is her childhood friend Smedley Hoover during her short visit, but it is in fact a test pilot named Morgan Hale. Her meeting with Morgan makes his date, Lola Cross so jealous that she stands him up.

Hedy also meets with her uncle, Dr. J.H ”Doc” Fredericks, who in vain tries to persuade her into staying and sharing his practice. She also visits another childhood friend named Stella Livingston, who is in need of plastic surgery after an accident at the defense plant. Hedy performs the surgery on her friend’s face, and then she goes out to the local hang-out with the three Smiths later in the night. There they meet Morgan, Lola, and a beautiful Russian pilot named Tanya. A series of complications occurs, leading to Morgan pursuing Tanya and Lola going out with Harry Smith.

Morgan is still angry at Hedy for breaking up his date earlier, but they make up after he crashes his plane during a test flight and Hedy is the one to treat him afterwards. The next day though, Hedy heads for Chicago after taking Morgan’s stitches out, much to his disappointment. Desperate to get Hedy to stay, Morgan chases her in his car, but crashes again, leading to Hedy having to treat him again. The next day, Morgan has another condition in need of treatment, and Hedy continues treating him. She spends a lot of time with Morgan, but doesn’t realize her feelings for him until Morgan stays out all night with Lola, and she gets jealous. Her uncle reveals that he and Morgan have been in on a plan to get her to stay in town. Furious, Hedy starts treating Morgan with a series of very unpleasant and rough sine cures, trying to make him expose himself as a fraud. Then she tries to leave for Chicago one more time, but slips on an ice cube from one of her rough treatments and is knocked unconscious. When she wakes up, she confesses her love for Morgan and they have their first kiss.

== Cast ==
- John Carroll as Morgan Hale
- Ruth Hussey as Dr. Hedy Fredericks, MD
- Charles Ruggles as Dr. J.H. "Doc" Fredericks
- Ann Rutherford as Lola Cross
- Esther Dale as Martha Gravitt
- Grant Mitchell as Mr. Pope
- Frank Jenks as Pvt. Harry Smith
- Vera Marshe as Mrs. Mary Hastings
- Claudia Drake as Tanya Punchinskaya
- Renee Godfrey as Stella Livingston
- Joel McGinnis as Pvt Tommy Smith
- John James as Pfc. Dick Smith
- Bert Roach as George Hastings
