= Dreary House =

1928 film

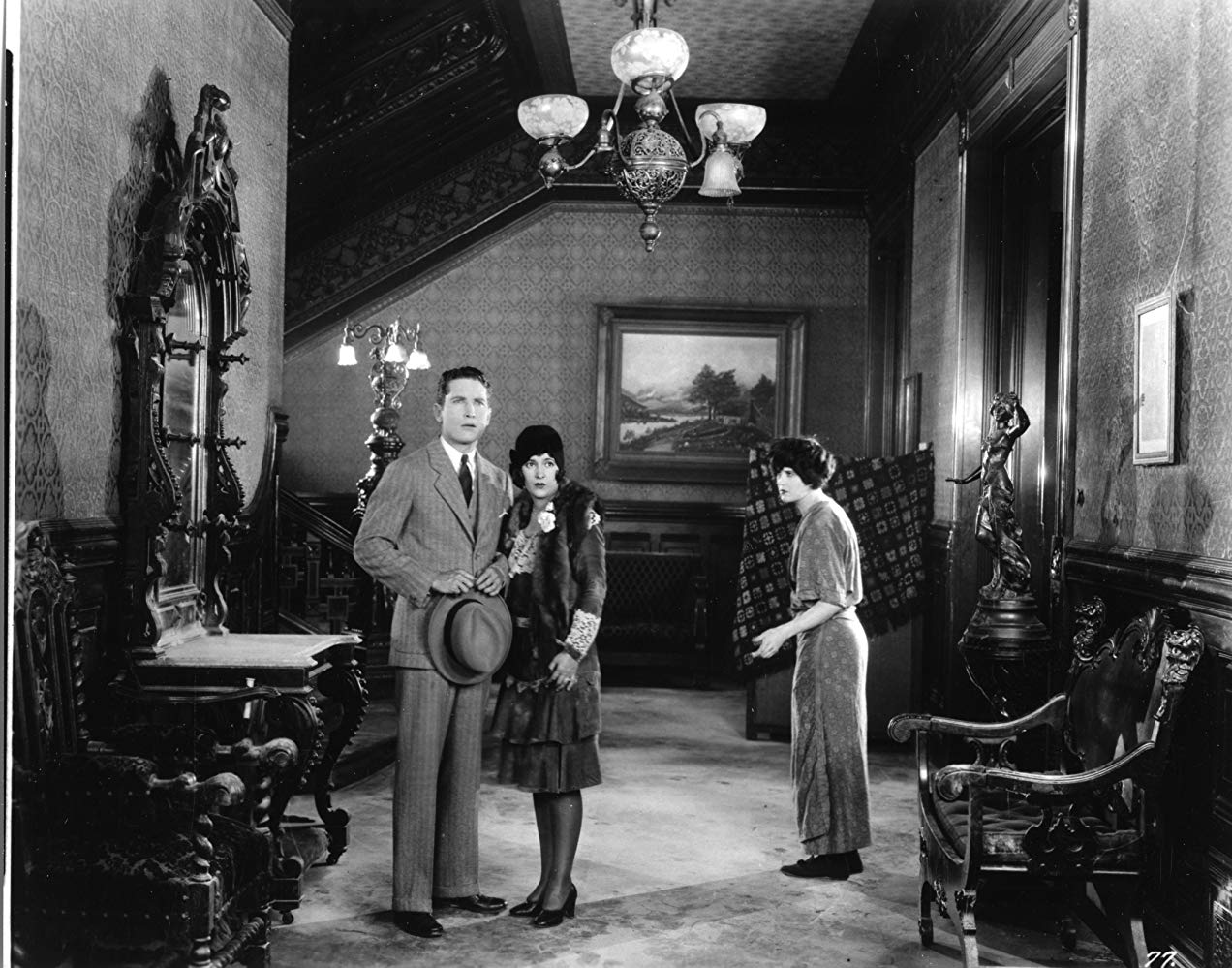
- Directed by: Andrew L. Stone
- Written by: Andrew L. Stone
- Produced by: C.C. Burr
- Starring: Edith Roberts; Margaret Livingston; Ford Sterling
- Production company: Bell Pictures
- Release date: July 12, 1928
- Running time: 8 reels
- Country: United States
- Language: Silent (English intertitles)

Dreary House is a 1928 American silent drama film directed by Andrew L. Stone and starring Edith Roberts, Margaret Livingston, and Ford Sterling.

== Plot ==
On the day off her marriage a young woman inherits an old mansion, currently occupied by a strange housekeeper. When a murder of one of her former lovers takes place there, she finds herself to be the prime suspect.

== Cast ==
- Edith Roberts as Mary Wheeler
- Margaret Livingston as Nancy Crowl
- Ford Sterling as Paul
- Noah Beery
- Earle Hughes
- Josef Swickard
- Edwin August

== Bibliography ==
- Munden, Kenneth White. The American Film Institute Catalog of Motion Pictures Produced in the United States, Part 1. University of California Press, 1997.
