= Barney Phillips =

American actor (1913–1982)

- Phillips in The Betty White Show, 1977
- Born: Bernard Philip Ofner; October 20, 1913; St. Louis, Missouri, U.S.
- Died: August 17, 1982 (aged 68); Los Angeles, California, U.S.
- Occupation: Actor
- Years active: 1937–1982
- Spouse: Marie A. Davis (?–1982)

Bernard Philip Ofner (October 20, 1913 – August 17, 1982), better known by his stage name Barney Phillips, was an American film, television, and radio actor. His roles include that of Sgt. Ed Jacobs on the 1950s Dragnet television series, appearances in the 1960s on The Twilight Zone, in which he played a Venusian living under cover on Earth in "Will the Real Martian Please Stand Up?", and supporting roles as Major "Doc" Kaiser in ABC military drama 12 O'Clock High, and as actor Fletcher Huff in the 1970s CBS series The Betty White Show.

== Biography and career ==
He was born in St Louis, Missouri, to Harry Nathan Ofner, a commercial salesman for the leather industry, and Leona (Frank) Ofner, a naturalized citizen of German origin, who went by the nickname Lonnie. He grew up and was educated in St. Louis, then moved to Los Angeles after he graduated from college in 1935.

Interested in acting, he got a small part in an independently produced Grade-B Western called Black Aces in 1937, but his show business career then languished. In 1940, he was in Meet the People on Broadway.

Phillips enlisted in the United States Army in July 1941, serving in the signal corps during World War II.

Following the war, Phillips procured small parts in several films during 1949–1952, before getting a regular role on the NBC television version of Jack Webb's Dragnet, as Sgt. Jacobs. He was heard in the recurring role of Hamilton J. Finger, a police sergeant in Frank Sinatra's radio program Rocky Fortune in 1953 and 1954. Thereafter, he was a prolific character actor in both films and television series throughout the 1950s and 1960s. In 1955, he played Mr. Jamison in the I Love Lucy episode "Ricky's European Booking." He also played minor roles in two episodes of Perry Mason, including Mr. Johnson in "The Case of the Wintry Wife" in 1961.

In 1959, he had a steady role on Gunsmoke as Long Branch Saloon co-owner Bill Pence.

In 1962, Phillips was cast as the historical General Winfield Scott Hancock in the episode "The Truth Teller" of the syndicated anthology series Death Valley Days, hosted by Stanley Andrews. The episode focuses on the negotiations leading to the Medicine Lodge Treaty of 1867. Ed Kemmer appeared as investigative reporter Henry Morton Stanley, who assesses Hancock's success in avoiding war on the frontier. Charles Carlson, who had a limited acting career from 1960 to 1967, was cast as Wild Bill Hickok.

Phillips remained active in television through the 1970s until his death in 1982. He was generally a guest star or featured player (e.g. a one-time appearance as an escaped criminal on the Andy Griffith Show); but he did have a number of recurring character roles in television, as series regular "Doc" Kaiser in Twelve O'Clock High (1964–1967), and as a regular on The Betty White Show (1977–1978). However, his best known role is likely to be as a diner counterman who is revealed to be a three-eyed extraterrestrial in "Will the Real Martian Please Stand Up?", a 1961 episode of The Twilight Zone.

Among many other appearances, Phillips can be seen briefly in Stan Freberg's Jeno's pizza roll commercial.

== Death ==
Phillips died of cancer on August 17, 1982, aged 68, at the Cedars-Sinai Medical Center in Los Angeles.

== Partial filmography ==
- Black Aces (1937) .... Jake Stoddard
- The Judge (1949) .... Reporter
- Little Egypt (1951) .... Reporter (uncredited)
- My Six Convicts (1952) .... Baker foreman (uncredited)
- Has Anybody Seen My Gal (1952) .... Workman (uncredited)
- Down Among the Sheltering Palms (1952) .... Private Murphy (uncredited)
- Ruby Gentry (1952) .... Dr. Saul Manfred
- Eight Iron Men (1952) .... Captain Trelawney
- The Glass Wall (1953) .... Police Lieutenant Reeves (uncredited)
- The 49th Man (1953) .... Minor Role (uncredited)
- A Blueprint for Murder (1953) .... Captain Pringle
- All American (1953) .... Coach Clipper Colton
- The Night Holds Terror (1955) .... Stranske
- The Naked Street (1955) .... Callan (uncredited)
- The Square Jungle (1955) .... Dan Selby
- Medal of Honor (1955) .... Himself
- Behind the High Wall (1956) - Tom Reynolds
- Julie (1956) .... Doctor on Flight 36
- Drango (1957) .... Reverend Giles Cameron
- The True Story of Jesse James (1957) .... Dr. Samuel
- I Was a Teenage Werewolf (1957) .... Detective Sergeant Donovan
- Cry Terror! (1958) .... Dan Pringle
- Gang War (1958) .... Police Lieutenant Sam Johnson
- Kathy O' (1958) .... Matt Williams
- The Decks Ran Red (1958) .... Karl Pope
- The Threat (1960) .... Lucky
- Della (1964) .... Eric Kline
- The Sand Pebbles (1966) .... Chief Petty Officer Franks
- Dealing: Or the Berkeley-to-Boston Forty-Brick Lost-Bag Blues (1972) .... Minor Role (voice, uncredited)
- This Is a Hijack (1973) .... Banker
- Heidi in the Mountains (1974) .... Father and Mr. Kaehlin (English version, voice)
- No Deposit, No Return (1976) .... Sergeant Benson
- O'Hara's Wife (1982) .... Small Wino
- Beyond Reason (1985) .... Dr. Batt (final film role)

== Selection of television credits ==
- Dragnet: (1952) ...series regular as Sergeant Ed Jacobs
- I Love Lucy: "Ricky's European Booking" (1955) ...as Mr. Jamison
- Gunsmoke: "The Roundup" (1956) ...as Mr. Summers
- The Adventures of Ozzie and Harriet: (1957–1958) ...as various characters
- Peter Gunn: "The Blind Pianist" (1958) ...as Stephen Ware
- Gunsmoke: "Renegade White" (1959) ...as Ord Spicer
- Have Gun Will Travel: "The Monster of Moon Ridge" (1959) ...as Dan Bella
- Have Gun Will Travel: "The Shooting of Jessie May" (1960) ... as Joseph Ergo
- Gunsmoke: "Don Matteo" (1960)...as Long Branch Saloon Co-Owner Bill Pence
- Hawaiian Eye: "I Wed Three Wives" (1960) ...as Henry Bunker
- The Twilight Zone: "The Purple Testament" (1960) ...as Captain E. L. Gunther
- The Twilight Zone: "A Thing about Machines" (1960) ...as Television Repairman
- The Twilight Zone: "Will the Real Martian Please Stand Up?" (1961) ...as Haley, the short-order cook
- The Twilight Zone: "Miniature" (1963) ...as Diemel
- The Andy Griffith Show: "Barney Gets His Man" (1961) ...as Eddie Brooke, escaped convict
- The Dick Van Dyke Show: "The Cat Burglar" (1962) ...as Westchester Police Lieutenant
- The Alfred Hitchcock Hour (1962) (Season 1 Episode 4: "I Saw the Whole Thing") as Lieutenant Sweet
- The Alfred Hitchcock Hour (1963) (Season 2 Episode 7: "Starring the Defense") as Hanley
- Gunsmoke: "Carter Caper" (1963) ...as Smith
- "The Alfred Hitchcock Hour" (1964) (Season 2 Episode 28: "Who Needs an Enemy?") as The 1st Detective
- Twelve O'Clock High: (1964-1967) ...Major "Doc" Kaiser
- The Invaders: (1967) ...Episodes Task Force (Emmett Morgan), Quantity: Unknown (Walt Anson)
- Shazzan: (1967-1969) ...voice of Shazzan for all 36 episodes of animated series
- The Three Musketeers: (1968-1969) ...voice of Porthos for all 18 episodes of animated series
- Get Smart: "Greer Window" (1969) ...as Otto Greer
- Adam-12: "Log 93: Once a Junkie" (1969) ...as Sergeant Burdick
- Columbo "Suitable For Framing" (1971) ...as Captain Wyler
- The Funky Phantom (1971) ...as Additional voices
- Hawaii Five-O "Air Cargo… Dial for Murder" (1971) ...co-starring as Arnold Cook
- Cannon: (1971–1974) ...as various characters
- The Betty White Show (1977) ...actor playing Police Chief Fletcher Huff and his "twin" brother
- The Dukes of Hazzard (1979-1985) ...as Judge Buford Potts
