= A Blueprint for Murder =

1953 film by Andrew L. Stone

- Theatrical release poster
- Directed by: Andrew L. Stone (as Andrew Stone)
- Screenplay by: Andrew L. Stone (as Andrew Stone)
- Produced by: Michael Abel
- Starring: Joseph Cotten; Jean Peters; Gary Merrill
- Cinematography: Leo Tover
- Edited by: William B. Murphy
- Color process: Black and white
- Production company: 20th Century Fox
- Distributed by: 20th Century Fox
- Release date: September 1953
- Running time: 76 minutes
- Country: United States
- Language: English

A Blueprint for Murder is a 1953 American film noir thriller directed and written by Andrew L. Stone and starring Joseph Cotten, Jean Peters and Gary Merrill.

== Plot ==
Whitney "Cam" Cameron arrives at a hospital and learns that Polly, the stepdaughter of his widowed sister-in-law Lynne, is suffering violent convulsions resulting from an unknown illness. She later appears to recover but then experiences a relapse and dies. The doctors, who had initially suspected tetany, are unable to determine what had killed Polly.

Amateur sleuth Maggie, the wife of Cam's lawyer Fred, notices the similarities between Polly's symptoms and those of victims of strychnine poisoning about whom she has read. Cam arrives at the difficult realization that his dead brother, Lynne's former husband, died under remarkably identical circumstances, but he is hesitant to suspect Lynne, for whom he has developed romantic feelings. Fred reveals that Cam's brother's will bequeaths his large fortune to Lynne only in the event that both of his children die, providing her with a credible motive for killing her husband and Polly. Cam's immediate concern becomes the welfare of his young nephew, Doug, for whom he has great affection.

Cam requests an exhumation of Polly's body for chemical testing, and enough strychnine to kill four people is found in her corpse. The police charge Lynne with murder and she is brought before a judge, who dismisses the charges for lack of evidence. Lynne announces that she is taking Doug to Europe for a year, and Cam is desperate to stop her without causing her to know that he believes she is a murderer.

Cam visits a local store and asks the storekeeper about strychnine and other insect poisons. He learns that there is an especially potent insecticide with enough strychnine in it to kill a horse. The pills are labeled with a distinctive "W" marking. He buys a bottle of arsenic poison.

To intervene and protect Doug, Cam boards the Europe-bound ocean liner and surprises Lynne and Doug. His ruse is that he cannot stand to be apart from Lynne, but he has secretly brought the bottle of arsenic aboard in order to kill Lynne and thereby save Doug. He convincingly pretends to romance Lynne but is tortured by his indecision, as he cannot bring himself to kill her but feels that he must do so.

Cam secretly searches Lynne's belongings and finds several pills marked with the "W" intermixed in a bottle with aspirin tablets. Now believing that he has proof that Lynne had indeed poisoned Polly and his brother, Cam devises a plan. In Lynne's stateroom, he surreptitiously dissolves one of the "W" tablets into her drink and she consumes it. Cam then informs her that the drink contained poison but if she seeks medical help immediately, her life can be spared. Lynne acts nervously but defiantly denies any wrongdoing and insists that the pills are all simply aspirin. The ship's detective, who had been hiding in another room, reveals himself. When the clock passes the time at which Cam believes that the poison would have incapacitated Lynne, she indignantly expels the men from her room. Cam is overwhelmed with guilt at having suspected Lynne and is grateful that he had scuttled his earlier opportunity to kill her. A short while later, Cam is summoned to the office of the ship's doctor and learns that Lynne had rushed to the doctor, dying from strychnine poisoning, just after Cam and the detective had left her stateroom. The doctor is able to save her life with no time to spare.

A court sentences Lynne to prison for life for the murders of Polly and her husband.

== Cast ==
- Joseph Cotten as Whitney 'Cam' Cameron
- Jean Peters as Lynne Cameron
- Gary Merrill as Fred Sargent
- Catherine McLeod as Maggie Sargent
- Jack Kruschen as Detective Lt. Harold Y. Cole
- Barney Phillips as Detective Capt. Pringle
- Freddy Ridgeway as Doug Cameron (as Fred Ridgeway)

== Reception ==
In a contemporary review for The New York Times, critic Howard Thompson wrote:

While supposedly based on fact, the rhetorical contrivances of this lengthy Twentieth Century-Fox item defeat a trim little cast headed by Joseph Cotten and Jean Peters, and offers a few bursts of suspense and a fairly provocative story blueprint, the stalking of a beautiful poison expert. ... However, Mr. Stone's plodding fixation on conventionalized justice, redundantly stressed in the hero's narration, sidesteps any surprises along the way. Indeed it loses conviction altogether before the climax, when he traps the culprit aboard an ocean liner, squiring her intended victim and enough strychnine—as Mr. Cotten accuses her, twice—to choke a horse. "This farce," replies the understandably surly Miss Peters, ''has gone on long enough."
