= Jack Kruschen =

Canadian-American actor (1922–2002)

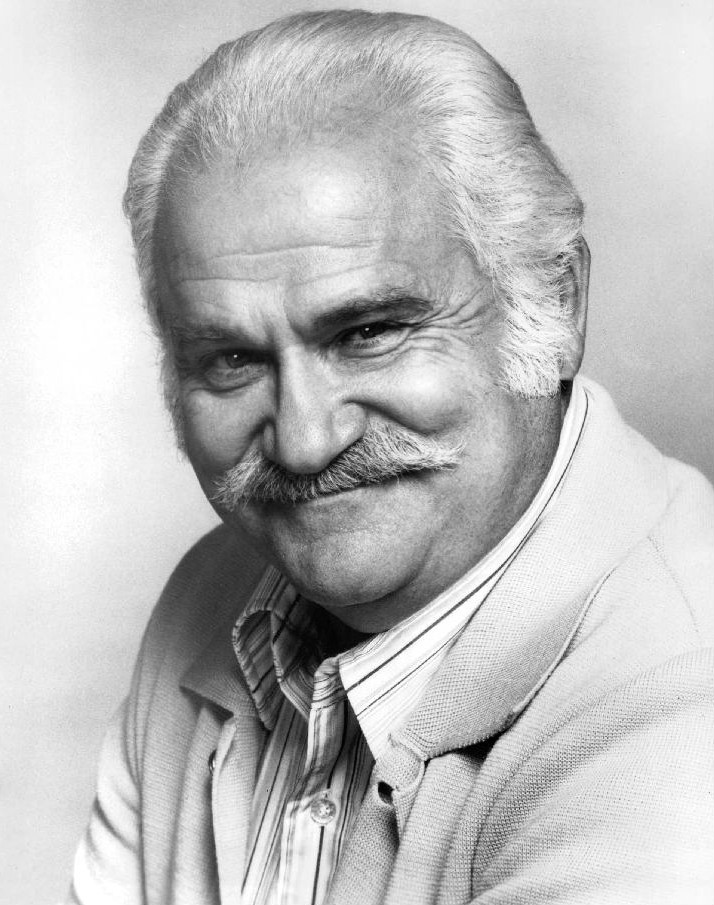
- Kruschen in 1976
- Born: Jacob Kruschen; March 20, 1922; Winnipeg, Manitoba, Canada
- Died: April 2, 2002 (aged 80); Kelowna, British Columbia, Canada
- Years active: 1939–1997
- Spouses: Marjorie Ullman (m. 1947; div. 1961) Violet Rafaella Mooring (m. 1962; died 1978) Mary Pender (m. 1979)
- Children: 2

Jacob Joseph "Jack" Kruschen (March 20, 1922 – April 2, 2002) was a Canadian-American actor, known for his many character roles. He was nominated the Academy Award for Best Supporting Actor for his role as Dr. Dreyfuss in the 1960 comedy-drama The Apartment.

== Early life ==
Kruschen was born in Winnipeg, Manitoba in 1922, the son of a watchmaker. His parents were of Russian Jewish descent.

Kruschen and his family moved to Los Angeles when he was a teenager, where he attended Hollywood High School. His acting in a school operetta brought him to the attention of CBS.

== Career ==
=== Radio ===
Kruschen began working at a radio station in Los Angeles when he was 16. During World War II, he served in the Army, assigned to the Armed Forces Radio Service (AFRS). Following the war, he resumed working on network programs, including Broadway Is My Beat (as Mugovin, a detective), and Pete Kelly's Blues (as club owner George Lupo), as well as frequent episodic roles on anthology series, westerns and crime dramas.

He also performed on Escape; Dragnet; Gunsmoke (usually as law-abiding locals); Full House; Crime Classics; Frontier Gentleman; Yours Truly, Johnny Dollar; Nightbeat and Suspense.

=== Film ===
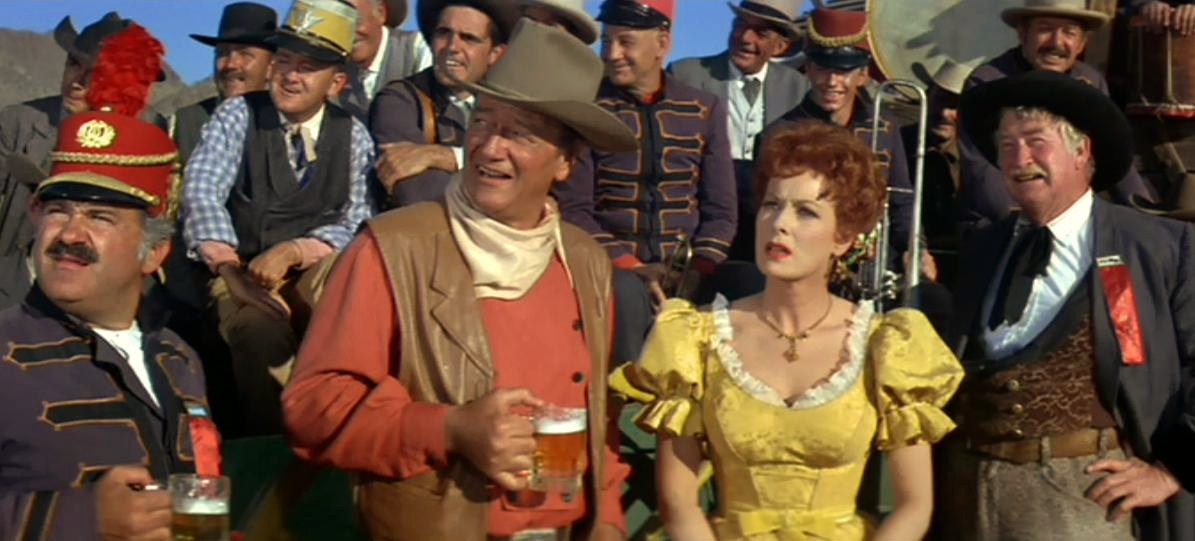
Front row, from left to right: Jack Kruschen, John Wayne, Maureen O'Hara and Chill Wills in McLintock!

Kruschen received a nomination for the Academy Award for Best Supporting Actor for his performance as Dr. Dreyfuss in Billy Wilder's The Apartment. That same year, the ever-profiled Kruschen also appeared in the films The Bellboy, Studs Lonigan, Seven Ways from Sundown, Where the Boys Are, and The Last Voyage, as Chief Engineer Pringle.

Kruschen's film debut came in Red, Hot, and Blue. His other films included George Pal's The War of the Worlds (as Salvatore, one of the first three victims, a role he reprised on the Lux Radio Theater adaptation); in Cecil B. DeMille's final film, The Buccaneer; as astronaut Sam Jacobs in the 1959 cult classic The Angry Red Planet; The Unsinkable Molly Brown (as saloon owner Christmas Morgan); Abbott and Costello Go to Mars; Lover Come Back; McLintock! (with John Wayne and Maureen O'Hara); Follow That Dream (with Elvis Presley); Cape Fear, starring Gregory Peck and Robert Mitchum; and Money to Burn with Eve McVeagh.

=== Stage ===
Kruschen appeared as Maurice Pulvermacher in the original 1962 Broadway production of I Can Get It for You Wholesale. In 1969, he co-starred in the London staging of the musical drama Promises, Promises, reprising his film role in this show based on The Apartment.

=== Television ===
Kruschen was performing on television as early as 1939, appearing in dramas on Don Lee's experimental television station in Los Angeles, where he was seen on some two hundred television sets with three-inch screens. Thereafter, Kruschen's television career included guest villain Eivol Ekdol, a villainous magicians' craftsman on Batman (episodes 9 and 10). He was seen in twelve episodes of NBC's Dragnet (portraying a pedophile ice cream vendor in one infamous episode) as well as the ABC/Disney series, Zorro. He also appeared in a color episode of Adventures of Superman. He had a recurring role across three seasons on Bonanza (Italian grapegrower Giorgio Rossi). He also played Clyde Bailey in "The Retired Gun" (episode 17) and Sammy in "One Went to Denver" (episode 25).

In 1969, Kruschen co-starred with Stefanie Powers in an unsold ABC sitcom pilot, Holly Golighty, adapted from Truman Capote's Breakfast at Tiffany's. The husky, mustachioed Kruschen seemed to specialize in playing benevolent ethnic paternal figures. His roles included Sam Markowitz on Busting Loose, fireman Mike Woiski on Emergency!, Morris Sheinfeld on E/R, Tully on Hong Kong, and Jay Burrage on The Rifleman. He also appeared on Columbo (The Most Dangerous Match, 1973), Barney Miller, The Odd Couple, The Incredible Hulk, and, in later years, Murphy Brown and Lois and Clark: The New Adventures of Superman.

He appeared in the recurring role of "Grandpa Papadopolis" on Webster series (1985–87), and in the early 1990s, as another Greek grandfather and as Pam and Jesse's grandfather, Iorgos "Papouli" Katsopolis on Full House, appearing in only two episodes before his character is killed off in the episode, "The Last Dance". He also appeared as Kitty's grandfather, Fred Avery, on the CBC sitcom Material World from 1990 to 1993.

His final on-screen appearance was in the 1997 film 'Til There Was You as "Mr. Katz".

== Personal life ==
Kruschen was married three times. For many years, he was a parishioner at Shepherd Church in Porter Ranch, Los Angeles.

=== Death ===
Kruschen died at his residence in Kelowna, British Columbia, on April 2, 2002, at the age of 80. He had been in ill health for some time. Cause of death is given as a heart attack (myocardial infarction) following years of Type 2 diabetes. His death was not widely reported to the media until mid-late May.

== Filmography ==
=== Film ===
- Red, Hot and Blue (1949) as Steve
- Women from Headquarters (1950) as Sam
- Where Danger Lives (1950) as Cosey – Ambulance Driver (uncredited)
- No Way Out (1950) Undetermined Minor Role (uncredited)
- Gambling House (1950) as Burly Italian Immigrant (uncredited)
- Cuban Fireball (1951) as Lefty
- The Lemon Drop Kid (1951) as Muscleman (uncredited)
- Comin' Round the Mountain (1951) as Gangster in Night Club
- The People Against O'Hara (1951) as Detective (uncredited)
- Meet Danny Wilson (1951) as Drunken Heckler (uncredited)
- Confidence Girl (1952) as Detective Sergeant Quinn
- Just Across the Street (1952) Bit Part (uncredited)
- Shadow in the Sky (1952) as Intern (uncredited)
- The Miracle of Our Lady of Fatima (1952) as Sidonio (uncredited)
- Tropical Heat Wave (1952) as Stickey Langley
- The War of the Worlds (1953) as Salvatore
- Abbott and Costello Go to Mars (1953) as Harry
- Ma and Pa Kettle on Vacation (1953) as Jacques Amien (uncredited)
- Fast Company (1953) as Doc – Poker Player (uncredited)
- A Blueprint for Murder (1953) as Detective Lt. Harold Y. Cole
- The Long, Long Trailer (1953) as Mechanic (uncredited)
- Money from Home (1953) as Short Boy
- The Great Diamond Robbery (1954) as Cafe Counterman (uncredited)
- It Should Happen to You (1954) as Joe (uncredited)
- Tennessee Champ (1954) as Andrews
- Untamed Heiress (1954) as Louie
- Prince of Players (1955) as Rabble-Rouser (uncredited)
- Carolina Cannonball (1955) as Hogar
- Dial Red O (1955) as Lloyd Lavalle
- Soldier of Fortune (1955) as Austin Stoker
- The Night Holds Terror (1955) as Detective Pope
- The Benny Goodman Story (1956) as Murph Podolsky
- The Steel Jungle (1956) as Truckdriver Helper
- Outside the Law (1956) as Agent Phil Schwartz
- Julie (1956) as Det. Mace
- Badlands of Montana (1957) as Cavalry Sergeant
- Reform School Girls (1957) as Mr. Horvath
- Hear Me Good (1957) as Gaffer (uncredited)
- Cry Terror! (1958) as F.B.I. Agent Charles Pope
- Fräulein (1958) as Sgt. Grischa
- The Decks Ran Red (1958) as Alex Cole
- The Buccaneer (1958) as Hans
- The Man Who Understood Women (1959) as Mickey (uncredited)
- The Jayhawkers! (1959) as Cattleman (uncredited)
- Beloved Infidel (1959) as Darby Forsythe – Beach Bum (uncredited)
- The Angry Red Planet (1959) as CWO Sam Jacobs
- The Gazebo (1959) as Taxi Driver (uncredited)
- The Last Voyage (1960) as Chief Engineer Pringle
- The Apartment (1960) as Dr. Dreyfuss
- The Bellboy (1960) as Jack E. Mulcher, President of Paramount Pictures (uncredited)
- Studs Lonigan (1960) as Charlie the Greek
- Seven Ways from Sundown (1960) as Beeker
- Where the Boys Are (1960) as Max – Cafe Counterman (uncredited)
- The Ladies Man (1961) as Graduation Emcee Professor
- Lover Come Back (1961) as Doctor Linus Tyler
- Follow That Dream (1962) as Carmine
- Cape Fear (1962) as Attorney Dave Grafton
- Convicts 4 (1962) as Resko's Father
- McLintock! (1963) as Jake Birnbaum
- The Unsinkable Molly Brown (1964) as Christmas Morgan
- Dear Brigitte (1965) as Doctor Volker
- Harlow (1965) as Louis B. Mayer
- The Happening (1967) as Inspector
- Caprice (1967) as Matthew Cutter
- The Million Dollar Duck (1971) as Doctor Gottlieb
- Freebie and the Bean (1974) as Red Meyers
- Guardian of the Wilderness (1976) as Madden
- Satan's Cheerleaders (1977) as Billy
- Sunburn (1979) as Gela
- Under the Rainbow (1981) as Louie
- Legend of the Wild (1981)
- Money to Burn (1983) as Pops
- Penny Ante: The Motion Picture (1990) as Isadore (Izzy) Perlman
- 'Til There Was You (1997) as Mr. Katz

=== Television ===
- Dragnet – 12 episodes (1951–1959)
- Terry and the Pirates – episode "Macao Gold" (1952) as Chopstick Joe
- Craig Kennedy, Criminologist – "The Big Shakedown" (1952) as Jack Brown
- Treasury Men in Action – "Case of the Swindler's Gold" (1955) as Miguel
- The Adventures of Jim Bowie – "The Birth of the Blade" (1956) as Louis, and "Jackson's Assassination" (1957) as Frost
- Gunsmoke – "Spring Term" (1956) as Jed
- Crusader – "A Deal in Diamonds" (1956) as Leon
- Adventures of Superman – "Tomb of Zaharan" (1957) as First Airport Robber
- Zorro – "The Man with the Whip" and "The Cross of the Andes" (1958) as Jose Mordante
- Trackdown – "The Kid" (1958) as Milo York
- The Rifleman – "One Went to Denver" (1959) as Sammy, "The Retired Gun" (1959) as Clyde Bailey, "Baranca" (1960) as Doc Burrage, "Trail of Hate" (1960) as Doc Burrage
- Bat Masterson – "The Inner Circle" (1959) as Patch Finley, "The Desert Ship" (1959) as Ben Tarko
- Wanted: Dead or Alive – "The Empty Cell" (1959) as Hunt Willis, "Railroaded" (1959) as Sheriff Pig Wells
- The Rough Riders – "Ransom of Rita Renee" (1959) as Tully
- The D.A.'s Man – "Guns for Hire" (1959) as Leo Muller
- Sugarfoot – "The Desperadoes" (1959) as Sam Bolt
- The Detectives – "Twelve Hours to Live" (1960) as Fred Hambrough, "Secret Assignment" (1961) as Jonesy
- The Westerner – "Going Home" (1960) as Rigdon
- Richard Diamond, Private Detective – "The Lovely Fraud" (1960) as Max Schilling
- Death Valley Days – "Eagle in the Rocks" (1960) as Manuel Garcia
- Black Saddle – "The Apprentice" (1960) as Ben Winkleman
- Rawhide – "Canliss" (1964) as Barkeep
- I Spy – "Lisa" (1966) as Aram Kanjarian
- The Red Skelton Show – "The Bum Who Came in from the Cold" (1966) as Dr. Shnorba
- The John Forsythe Show – "Engagement, Italian Style" (1966) as Constantino
- Batman – "Zelda the Great" (1966) and "A Death Worse Than Fate" (1966) as Eivol Ekdal
- Bonanza – "Big Shadow on the Land" (1966), "The Deed and the Dilemma" (1967) and "The Sound of Drums" (1968) as Giorgio Rossi
- I Spy – "The Medarra Block" (1967) as Isaac
- The Mike Douglas Show (1967) as Himself
- Istanbul Express (1968 TV movie) as Captain Granicekm
- Ironside – "The Macabre Mr. Micawber (1968) as McKay, "Memory of an Ice Cream Stick" (1968) as Busch
- Daniel Boone – "Sweet Molly Malone" (1969) as Herman
- Holly Golightly (1969 TV movie)
- Hawaii Five-O – "For a Million... Why Not?" (1971) as Blumberg
- Emergency! – "The Wedsworth-Townsend Act" (1972) as State Assemblyman Michael Wolski
- Deadly Harvest (1972 TV movie)
- The Magician – "Ovation for Murder" (1973) as Albie Allikolos
- Columbo – "The Most Dangerous Match (1973)" as Tomlin Dudek
- Assignment: Vienna – "So Long, Charlie" (1973) as Orloff
- McCloud – "Shivaree on Delancy Street" (1974) as Selditz
- The Rockford Files – "Gearjammers, Part 2" (1975) as John Koenig
- The Log of the Black Pearl (1975 TV movie)
- The Whiz Kid and the Carnival Caper (1976 TV movie)
- Movin' On – "Living It Up!" (1976) as Mr. Nash
- Ellery Queen – "The Adventure of the Judas Tree" (1976) as Gunther Starr
- Walt Disney's Wonderful World of Color – "The Whiz Kid and the Carnival Caper: Parts 1 & 2" (1976) as Abner Debney
- The November Plan (1977 TV movie)
- The Life and Times of Grizzly Adams – Home of the Hawk (1977) as Metcalf, "Once Upon a Starry Night" (1978) as Frost-bite Foley
- Busting Loose – 12 episodes (1977) as Sam Markowitz
- Barney Miller – "Burial" (1977) as Julius Wittenour
- Incredible Rocky Mountain Race (1977 TV movie)
- The Time Machine (1978 TV movie)
- Once Upon a Starry Night (1978 TV movie)
- The Incredible Hulk – "Terror in Times Square" (1978) as Norman Abrams
- Trapper John, M.D. – "Deadly Exposure" (1979) as Nicholas Bulgari
- Alice – "Mel, the Magi" (1979) as Santa Claus
- Barney Miller – "The DNA Story" (1979) as Rudolph Kamen
- Vega$ – "Vendetta" (1980) as Carlo
- Cheaters (1980 TV movie)
- The Adventures of Huckleberry Finn (1980 TV movie)
- Little House on the Prairie – "Gambini the Great" (1981) as Rudolpho 'The Great' Gambini
- Trapper John, M.D. – "Cooperative Care" (1981) as Marvin Krakowsky
- CHiPs – "Home Fires Burning" (1981) as Frank Higgins
- Alice – "Carrie Chickens Out" (1981) as Benny Conway
- The Devlin Connection – "Brian and Nick" (1982) as Max Salkall
- No Soap, Radio – 5 episodes (1982) as Skit Performer
- Hart to Hart – "Hart and Sole" (1982) as Harry Fulterman
- Barney Miller – "Examination Day" (1982) as Benjamin Diamond
- Matt Houston – "The Crying Clown" (1983) as Jonas Van Poolen, "Company Secrets" (1985) as Reels
- Zorro and Son – "Zorro and Son" (1983) as Commandante La Brea
- The A-Team – "The Out-of-Towners" (1983) as Bernie Shatzman
- Hill Street Blues – "Fuched Again" (1984) as Isadore Fagenbaum
- Webster – 18 episodes (1984–1989) as 'Papa' Papadapolis
- Dark Mirror (1984 TV movie)
- Deadly Intentions (1985 TV movie)
- Too Close for Comfort – "Reconcilable Differences" (1985) as Dr. Axel Schreiber
- Remington Steele – "Springtime for Steele" (1985) as Buddy Brokaw
- Magnum, P.I. – "Laura" (1987) as Doheny's partner and speaker at the retirement
- Full House – "Greek Week" (1990) and "The Last Dance" (1994) as Iorgos 'Papouli' Katsopolis
- Material World – 8 episodes (1990–1991) as Fred Avery
- Matlock – "The Nightmare" (1991) as Judge Ogilvie/Bus Repairman
- Murder, She Wrote – "Tainted Lady" (1991) as Dr. John Logan
- The Fresh Prince of Bel-Air – "Home Is Where the Heart Attack Is" (1993) as Mr. Melville
- The American Clock (1993 TV movie)
- Hart to Hart: Home Is Where the Hart Is (1994 TV movie)
- Lois & Clark: The New Adventures of Superman – "Madame Ex" (1994) as Captain Keene
- Empty Nest – "What's a Mother to Do?" (1994) as Heshy
