= Virginia L. Stone =

American film director

- Born: May 3, 1921; Brooklyn, New York, United States
- Died: March 12, 1997 (aged 75); Los Angeles, California, United States
- Occupations: Film editor, producer, director
- Children: 2, including Christopher

Virginia Libely Stone (born May 3, 1921 – March 12, 1997) was an American film editor, producer and director. She is known for her collaborations with her husband, filmmaker Andrew L. Stone. One of her sons she had with Andrew, Christopher L. Stone, is a film and television composer.

== Filmography as director ==
- Run If You Can (1987)
- Money to Burn (1983)
- The Treasure of Jamaica Reef (aka Evil in the Deep) (1975)
