= Coca-Cola Topnotchers =

US radio program

- Genre: Sports/Variety
- Running time: 30 minutes
- Country of origin: United States
- Language(s): English
- Home station: WEAF
- Syndicates: NBC Red
- Hosted by: Grantland Rice
- Starring: Topnotchers (aka The Coca-Cola Topnotchers Orchestra); Leonard Joy (first conductor); Gus Haenschen (second conductor); James Melton (tenor); Olga Albani (contralto); Phil Dewey (baritone); Lewis James (tenor); Elizabeth Lennos
- Announcer: Graham McNamee
- Recording studio: WEAF Recording Studios, New York City
- Original release: March 19, 1930 – May 25, 1932
- No. of series: 3
- No. of episodes: 114
- Opening theme: "The Coca-Cola Waltz" (recorded and conducted by Leonard Joy and his "Coca-Cola Topnotchers Orchestra")
- Ending theme: "The Coca-Cola Waltz"
- Sponsored by: Coca-Cola

Coca-Cola Topnotchers is an American old-time radio program starring sportscaster Grantland Rice and announced by Graham McNamee who, at the time, was regarded as "the [radio's] most recognized national personality in its first international decade."

The late-night program featured interviews with well-known sports celebrities and personalities of the era and sometimes included special instances during which McNamee spent several minutes reporting the latest in sports-related news. A 31-piece all-string orchestra provided music to supplement the verbal segments.

The program was broadcast live every Wednesday evening for its entire run from March 19, 1930, until May 25, 1932. It originated in the studios of WEAF in New York and was carried nationally over the NBC Red Network.

Some content from the program's broadcasts was released on Victor recordings CVE-59833 through CVE59839.

== See also ==
- Academy Award Theater
- Author's Playhouse
- The Campbell Playhouse
- Cavalcade of America
- CBS Radio Workshop
- Ford Theatre
- General Electric Theater
- Lux Radio Theatre
- The Mercury Theatre on the Air
- The MGM Theater of the Air
- The Screen Guild Theater
- Screen Director's Playhouse
