= Silver Theater (radio program) =

American radio dramatic anthology series

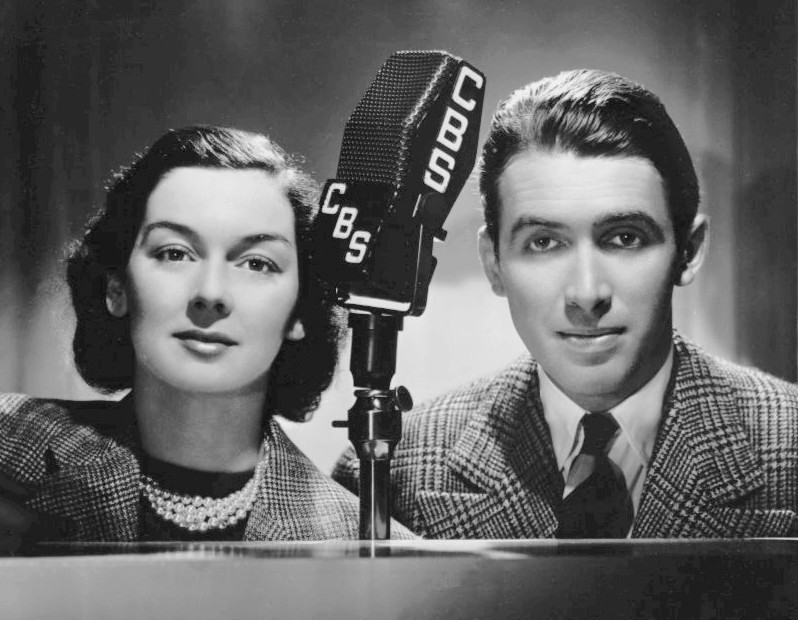
- Rosalind Russell and James Stewart as they appeared in the first four episodes of Silver Theater
- Other names: The 1847 Silver Theater
- Genre: Hollywood drama
- Running time: 30 minutes
- Country of origin: United States
- Language: English
- Syndicates: CBS; Canadian Broadcasting Corporation
- TV adaptations: The Silver Theatre
- Hosted by: Conrad Nagel; John Loder
- Starring: Hollywood stars
- Announcer: John Conte; Dick Joy; Henry Charles; Roger Krupp; Jack Bailey; Harry Bartell
- Written by: True Boardman; Grover Jones; Joseph Russell; George Wells
- Directed by: Glenhall Taylor
- Produced by: Glenhall Taylor; Edna Best; Ted Bliss; Walter Bunker
- Original release: October 3, 1937 – August 17, 1947
- Sponsored by: International Silver Company, Meriden, CT

Silver Theater (sometimes written as Silver Theatre) was a radio dramatic anthology series in the United States. Originating in Hollywood, California, it was carried on CBS and on the Canadian Broadcasting Corporation. First broadcast October 3, 1937, its last broadcast was August 17, 1947.

== Format ==
=== Drama ===
Originally, Silver Theater featured movie stars, primarily in original dramas and less often in adaptations of movies. Comedies were presented occasionally. In a reversal of the customary trend, some original dramas from Silver Theater were purchased for use in movies. In 1947, when the program was broadcast as a summer replacement series, radio stars—rather than those from movies—were used as leads.

=== Variety ===
In 1941, the Summer Silver Theater was a variety program, with Ed Sullivan as host and Will Bradley as bandleader. A guest star featured each week.

== Personnel ==
By its nature, Hollywood Star Playhouse had no regular cast. Different movie stars of the era were featured, as indicated in the sampling of episodes and stars listed below. One continuing presence was that of the host, who was referred to as the "director" on the air. Conrad Nagel was the initial host. John Loder replaced him in the early 1940s. Announcers over the program's lifetime were John Conte, Dick Joy, Henry Charles, Roger Krupp, Jack Bailey, and Harry Bartell. Felix Mills directed the orchestra.

== Selected episodes ==
Date(s)	Episode	Star(s)
October 3, 10, 17, 24, 1937	"First Love"	Rosalind Russell, James Stewart
March 5, 1939	"Single Party Going East"	Ginger Rogers
March 26, April 2, 1939	"For Us, the Living"	Rosalind Russell
May 21, 28, 1939	"Crossroads for Two"	Helen Hayes, True Boardman
October 8, 15, 1939	"Lost Yesterday"	Loretta Young
April 21, 1940	"Census 1940"	Thomas Mitchell, Edna Best
April 28, 1940	"Days of Grace"	Carole Lombard
January 26, 1941	"Love's New Sweet Song"	Judy Garland
April 6, 1941	"Niagara to Reno"	Kay Kyser, Ginny Simms
October 5, 1941	"The Better the Day"	Mickey Rooney
February 1, 1942	"The Maltese Falcon"	Humphrey Bogart.
July 25, 1943	"China Bridge"	Ellen Drew, Preston Foster
January 16, 1944	"Mr. Margie"	Bing Crosby
January 30, 1944	"For This We Live"	Dorothy Lamour
February 6, 1944	"Travel Is Broadening"	William Powell
April 2, 1944	"The Steadfast Heart"	Paul Lukas
April 30, 1944	"The Snow Goose"	Ronald Colman
May 14, 1944	"Little Johnny Appleseed"	Kate Smith
June 4, 1944	"Nothing Ever Happens"	Joan Bennett
June 25, 1944	"Suez Road"	Ann Sothern
August 5, 1945	"A Charmed Life"	Joan Davis, Harry von Zell

== Sponsor and promotions ==
The sponsor, International Silver Company, launched the program by inviting couples married 25 years or more to the CBS studio for the initial broadcast on October 3, 1937.

International Silver apparently chose well in selecting Silver Theater as a vehicle for advertising. The company's satisfaction with increased sales was such that CBS ran a four-page advertisement in the March 1, 1940, issue of Broadcasting magazine touting the advertising's effectiveness. The ad quoted comments from International Silver: "After thirteen weeks on CBS: 'We find we can paint a more alluring picture ... by radio than with the printed page.' ... After three years on CBS: '[S]ubstantial increase in sales for every year we have been on the air.'" As the ad continued, it noted that Silver Theater had become more popular over those three years and that "as the popularity of the program has increased, sales of 1847 Rogers Bros. have increased."

Concurrently, the International Silver Company advertised their 1847 Rogers Bros. silverware with advertisements in LIFE magazine including product endorsements by Hollywood actresses. Many also performed in the Silver Theater, including Judy Garland, Carole Lombard, Ginger Rogers, Rosalind Russell, and Loretta Young. Another brand of the company, International Sterling, also promoted the Silver Theater in LIFE magazine advertisements.

CBS also produced a brochure "showing success of the Silver Theatre."

== Adaptations ==
International Silver of Canada, counterpart of Silver Theater's sponsor, had its own version of the program (Summer Silver Theatre) on the CBC in 1941. The program "bore little resemblance to its American counterpart" and lasted for only 10 episodes.

== See also ==
- Brownstone Theater
- The Cresta Blanca Hollywood Players
- The Dreft Star Playhouse
- Everyman's Theater
- Famous Jury Trials
- Four Star Playhouse
- Hollywood Hotel
- Hollywood Star Playhouse
- Hollywood Star Time (dramatic anthology)
- Lux Radio Theatre
- Mayor of the Town
- The MGM Theater of the Air
- Philip Morris Playhouse
- Stars over Hollywood (radio program)
