= Hollywood Star Playhouse =

American radio drama series

- Genre: Dramatic anthology
- Running time: 30 minutes
- Country of origin: United States
- Language: English
- Syndicates: CBS; ABC; NBC
- Announcer: Norman Brokenshire; Wendell Niles
- Written by: Milton Geiger; Frank Burt; Robert Libbott
- Directed by: Jack Johnstone
- Narrated by: Herbert Rawlinson; Orval Anderson
- Original release: April 24, 1950 – February 15, 1953

Hollywood Star Playhouse is a radio dramatic anthology series in the United States. It was broadcast April 24, 1950 – February 15, 1953, appearing on CBS, ABC and NBC over that span.

== Format ==
As the name implies, Hollywood Star Playhouse featured movie stars, as did a number of other old-time radio programs. A news brief announcing the premiere broadcast noted that the program would feature "a different top screen personality each week in original stories of mystery and adventure by leading Hollywood writers." Those stories were what distinguished this program from others, according to radio historian John Dunning. He wrote that the stories were "tense, original suspense plays well suited for the half-hour." Writers usually created scripts for specific stars. One story, The Six Shooter, broadcast April 13, 1952, starred Stewart and later was turned into a series by that same name in which Stewart starred.

== Characters and cast ==
By its nature, Hollywood Star Playhouse had no regular cast. Different movie stars of the era, such as James Stewart, Deborah Kerr and Victor Mature were featured each week. The program was the venue for the radio debuts of Marilyn Monroe, Tony Curtis and Charlton Heston. Casts were rounded out by radio actors such as Wendell Niles, William Conrad, Betty Lou Gerson and Harry Bartell.

The one consistent voice from week to week was the host-narrator. Herbert Rawlinson originally filled that role, followed by Orval Anderson. Jeff Alexander was the first orchestra leader for the program. Basil Adlam later had that role.

== Broadcast history ==
As indicated in the table below, Hollywood Star Playhouse ran on three networks during its almost three years on radio, with two sponsors during that span. Although many radio programs took the summer off, with replacement programs filling their time slot, Hollywood Star Playhouse continued. An account executive at the advertising agency that handled the program said, "Our agency believes the huge amount of out-of-home listening in car radios and other secondary sets makes radio an excellent buy during the warm weather season."

Starting Date	Ending Date	Network	Sponsor
April 24, 1950	July 16, 1951	CBS	Bromo-Seltzer
July 26, 1951	January 17, 1952	ABC	none
February 24, 1952	February 15, 1953	NBC	Bakers of America

The period of sponsorship by Bakers of America—an umbrella group comprising the American Bakers' Association, The Bakers of America and Quality Bakers of America—produced an unusual situation with regard to commercials. Sponsor magazine reported that Bakers of America asked local bakers not to buy commercial time adjacent to Hollywood Star Playhouse's time slot in order to emphasize the industry as a whole. A news brief in the magazine called that decision "[u]nique among institutional air efforts," adding that normally local advertisers bought time in station breaks or immediately before or after a program "to capitalize simultaneously" with the national advertising. That request came in sharp contrast to a comment made earlier by the director of Bakers of America. The January 28 issue of Sponsor reported that Walter H. Hopkins, the organization's director, "said radio presented tremendous opportunity for local tie-ins by bakers."

== Episodes ==
On January 18, 1953, Richard Conte starred in "Blackout". On January 25, 1953, Janet Leigh starred in "Encore".

== Adaptation ==
A version of Hollywood Star Playhouse was available via syndication for television stations. It was included ("over 400 half hours") among a number of programs available from MCA in an eight-page ad in the trade magazine Broadcasting.

== See also ==
- Academy Award Theater
- Author's Playhouse
- Brownstone Theater
- The Campbell Playhouse
- Cavalcade of America
- CBS Radio Workshop
- The Dreft Star Playhouse
- Ford Theatre
- General Electric Theater
- Hollywood Playhouse
- Lux Radio Theater
- The Mercury Theatre on the Air
- Screen Director's Playhouse
- Suspense
- Theater Guild on the Air
