= Curtain Time (radio program) =

Anthology radio drama series

- Genre: Anthology
- Running time: 30 minutes
- Country of origin: United States
- Language: English
- Home station: WMAQ; WGN
- Syndicates: Mutual; ABC; NBC; CBC
- Starring: Olan Soule; Harry Elders; Nannette Sargent; Beverly Younger
- Announcer: Don Gordon; Myron (Mike) Wallace
- Directed by: Blair Walliser); Harry Holcomb; Norman Felton
- Original release: July 22, 1938 – March 29, 1950

Curtain Time is a radio anthology program in the United States. It was broadcast on ABC, CBS Mutual, and NBC during the old-time radio era, beginning in 1938 and ending in 1950.

== Format ==
Curtain Time was much like The First Nighter Program in that it simulated a theatrical environment "where listeners were invited to attend the evening's performance."

== Versions ==
=== Pre-network ===
In 1935, Curtain Time was carried on WMAQ in Chicago, Illinois. By October 1937, it had moved to WGN, also in Chicago. An item in the trade publication Broadcasting in 1938 noted, "[I]t is understood that the show may be extended nationally in late summer."

=== 1938–1939 ===
Beginning October 14, 1938, Curtain Time was carried on the Don Lee network as well as on WGN. An item in Broadcasting reported that General Mills had begun a 52-week sponsorship of Curtain Time for its Korn Kix cereal.

Olan Soule, who later starred in a similar show, The First Nighter Program, usually had the male lead in this season's episodes. The female leads varied, but they included Betty Lou Gerson and Louise Fitch. Other cast members included Alice Hill. Don Gordon was the announcer, and Blair Walliser was the director. Henry Weber directed the music.

=== 1945–1950 ===
Harry Elders was the regular male lead, with Beverly Younger and Nannette Sergeant splitting durites as female leads in this iteration of Curtain Time, which was sponsored by Mars, Incorporated. It was carried on ABC July 4, 1945 – June 27, 1946, and on NBC July 13, 1946 – March 29, 1950. The program was also heard in Canada via 29 CBC Trans-Canada stations. During the 1946–1947 season, Canadian coverage moved "from 28 CBS Trans-Canada stations to 44 Dominion stations."

Others often heard in the cast were Betty Winkler, George Cisar, Beryl Vaughn, Sunda Love, Sidney Ellstrom, Maurice Copeland, and Michael Romano. Hosts included Patrick Allen, Vincent Pelletier, and Lew Valentine. Mike Wallace (billed as Myron Wallace) was the announcer. Norman Felton and Harry Holcomb were directors. Porter Heaps and Burt Farber were music directors.

== See also ==
- Academy Award Theater
- Author's Playhouse
- Brownstone Theater
- The Campbell Playhouse
- Cavalcade of America
- CBS Radio Workshop
- Ford Theatre
- General Electric Theater
- Lux Radio Theatre
- The Mercury Theatre on the Air
- The Screen Guild Theater
- Screen Director's Playhouse
