= Gertrude Warner =

American actress

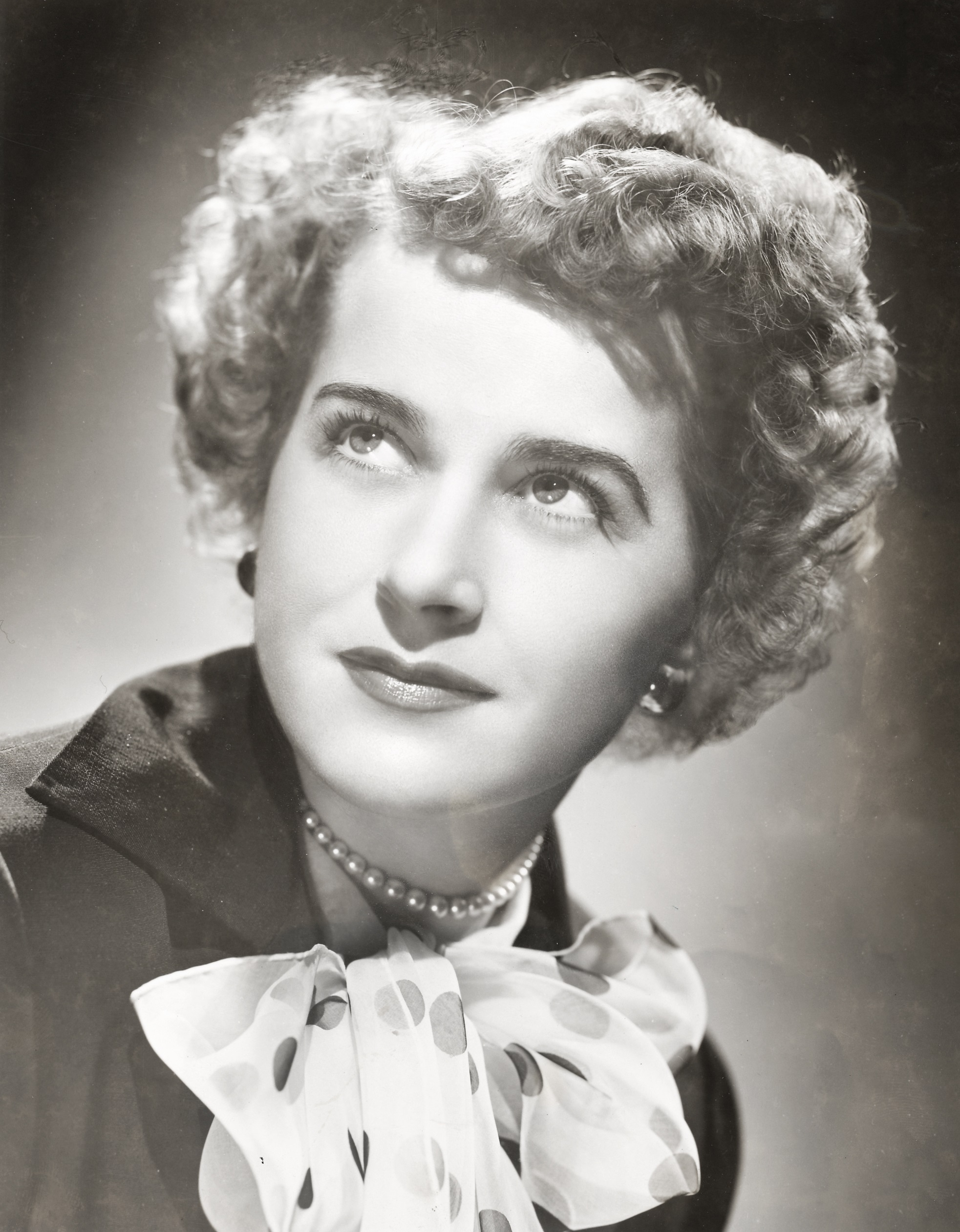
- Warner in 1950
- Born: April 2, 1917; Hartford, Connecticut, United States
- Died: January 26, 1986 (aged 68)
- Other name: Trudy Warner
- Occupation: Actor
- Years active: 1938–1970s
- Known for: Perry Mason; The Shadow; Joyce Jordan, M.D.
- Spouse: Carl Douglas Frank (1955–1957)
- Children: 1

Gertrude Warner (April 2, 1917 – January 26, 1986) was an American voice talent who played multiple characters on radio productions during the Golden Age of Radio.

== Early life ==
Warner was born in Hartford, Connecticut, in 1917. Her father was James L. Warner. Her mother was Mildred Lovejoy Warner. Her brother, James L. Warner, was a B17 pilot in World War II.

== Career ==
In 1938, Warner went to New York after having acted with a radio stock company in Hartford, Connecticut. A week after she arrived, she had the lead role in the radio drama Against the Storm.

Warner's first starring role on radio came when she was 23, playing Rebecca Lane in Beyond These Valleys on CBS. Her successful radio career continued for 28 years and well over 4,000 performances. She was considered one of the queens of daytime radio, appearing in dozens of daytime serials. Among her accomplishments was being the female lead on the dramatic anthology Brownstone Theater on Mutual. She portrayed such well known characters as Della Street on the daytime The New Adventures of Perry Mason, "the lovely Margot Lane" on The Shadow, and the title character on Joyce Jordan, M.D. The December 6, 1943 Lux Radio Theatre 60-minute radio adaptation of the film Mrs. Miniver proved so popular, it was developed into a daytime serial in early 1944. Warner was the second actor to take the title role and act as the narrator on this short-lived soap opera.

Trudy Warner played leading, supporting and some times guest roles on popular radio series, such as Young Doctor Malone, The Mystery Man, Dimension X, Nick Carter, Master Detective, Dangerously Yours, Suspense, Cavalcade of America, Matinee Theater, The MGM Theater of the Air and dozens more programs. She was the third-busiest actor in the Golden Age of Radio.

Her only visual credit is as one of five actresses playing the character of Claire English on the daytime soap opera As the World Turns. She also appeared in some television commercials.

Later in her life, she taught acting for television at Oberlin College and Weist Barron studios.

== Personal life ==
Warner was married to Carl Frank from 1955 until 1957. Together they have a son, Douglas Warner Frank. She also has two grandchildren, Griffin and Caroline Frank.

== Death ==
Warner died on January 26, 1986, from cancer.
