= Brownstone Theater =

Anthology drama radio series

- Genre: Dramatic anthology
- Running time: 30 minutes
- Country of origin: United States
- Language: English
- Home station: WOR
- Syndicates: Mutual
- Hosted by: Clayton Hamilton
- Starring: Jackson Beck; Les Tremayne; Gertrude Warner
- Written by: Peggy L. Mayer; Anzie Strickland; Florence North; Gladys Milliner; Jock MacGregor; Eleanor Abbey; Keith Thompson
- Directed by: Jock MacGregor
- Narrated by: Clayton Hamilton
- Original release: February 21 – September 23, 1945

Brownstone Theater is an old-time radio dramatic anthology series in the United States. It was broadcast on the Mutual Broadcasting System February 21, 1945 – September 23, 1945.

== Format ==
Brownstone Theater featured adaptations of stories and plays that were popular at the turn of the 20th century. The premiere offering, The Lion and the Mouse, was followed by productions such as The Man Without a Country, The Prisoner of Zenda, and Cyrano de Bergerac. A contemporary publication's radio listing described the material as "Revivals of some of the plays that thrilled Grandpa and Grandma."

Radio historian John Dunning wrote in On the Air: The Encyclopedia of Old-Time Radio, "The format was faintly reminiscent of the famous First Nighter Program, with the listener led to his seat in the Brownstone Theater, and other trappings of curtains and greasepaint adding to the atmosphere."

The program was actually produced in the Longacre Theater in New York City's Times Square. The theater was leased by WOR from 1944 to 1953 and was used for productions on that station and on the Mutual network.

== Personnel ==
The host and narrator of Brownstone Theater was Clayton Hamilton, who had been a drama critic when some of the dramas were popular on Broadway.

Jackson Beck and Gertrude Warner were the original leading man and leading lady, respectively. Les Tremayne replaced Beck in July 1945. Others heard on the program included Inge Adams, Jan Miner, Elissa Landi, Jane Cowl, Edward Rose, Anthony Hope, Neil Hamilton, Walter Hampden, Michael Fitzmaurice and Shep Menken.

Sylvan Levin provided the music, and Jock MacGregor was the director. Writers for the adaptions included Peggy L. Mayer, Anzie Strickland, Florence North, Gladys Milliner, Jock MacGregor, Eleanor Abbey, and Keith Thompson.

== Television ==
Some episodes of Brownstone Theater were broadcast by WABD, the DuMont Television Network's station in New York City. Bob Emery, the program's producer, cited it as one of the "shows which were fairly good examples of small budget dramatic television fare" in the mid-1940s. The radio programs were filmed live via Kinescope and then were broadcast two or three weeks later on the TV station. The only changes made to accommodate TV were use of "a miniature stage and curtains through which to introduce and close each television presentation."

At least four episodes of Brownstone Theater were also televised on WRGB in Schenectady, New York.

== See also ==
- The Cresta Blanca Hollywood Players
- Curtain Time
- The Dreft Star Playhouse
- Everyman's Theater
- The First Nighter Program
- Four Star Playhouse
- Hollywood Hotel
- Hollywood Star Playhouse
- Hollywood Star Time
- The MGM Theater of the Air
- Philip Morris Playhouse
- Silver Theater
- Stars over Hollywood
