= The Campbell Playhouse (radio series) =

Radio series

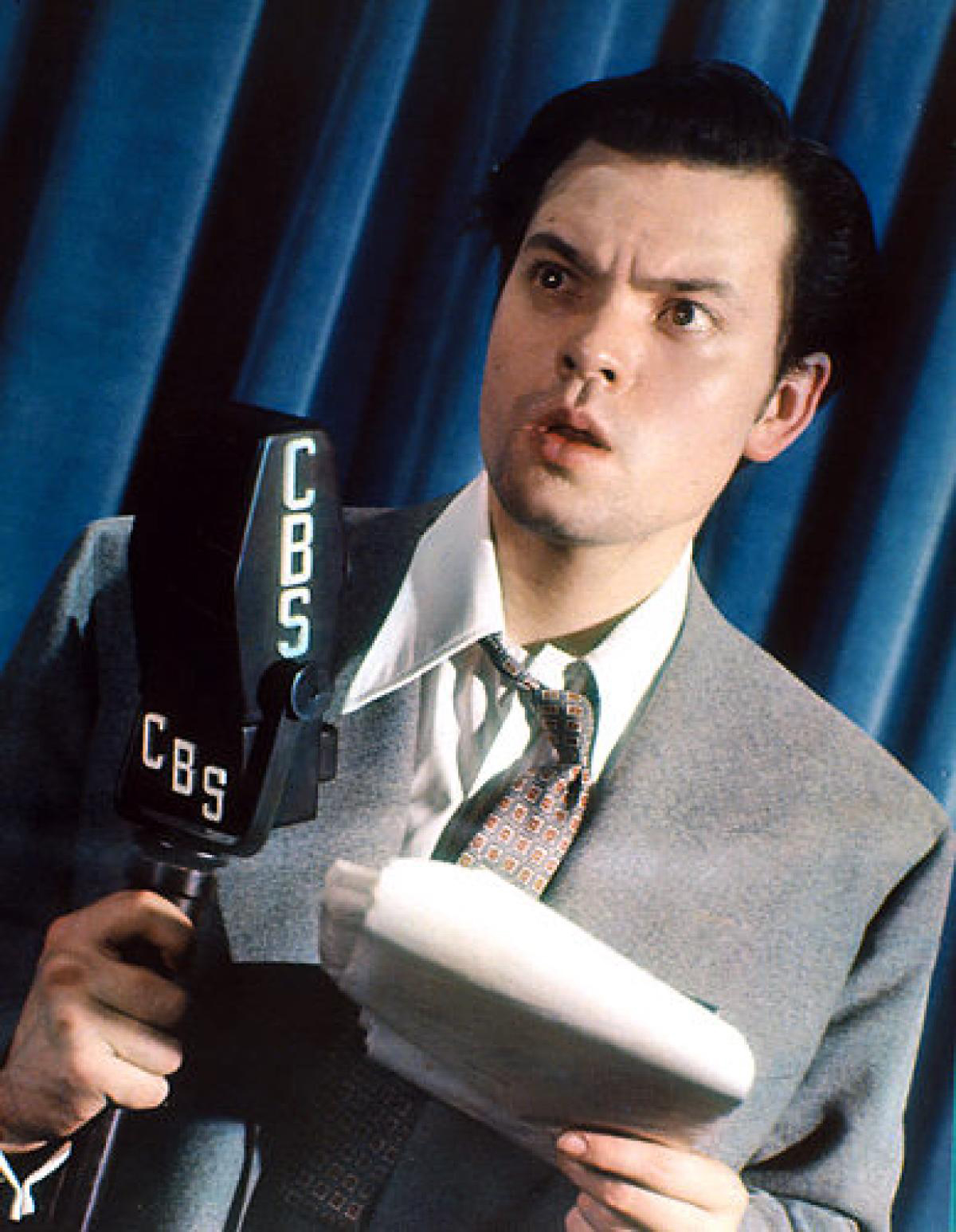
- Orson Welles in 1938
- Genre: Anthology drama
- Running time: 60 minutes
- Country of origin: United States
- Language: English
- Home station: CBS
- Hosted by: Orson Welles
- Starring: Orson Welles; William Alland; Georgia Backus; Edgar Barrier; Bea Benaderet; Ray Collins; Joseph Cotten; George Coulouris; Arlene Francis; Alice Frost; Helen Hayes; Sam Levene; Agnes Moorehead; Frank Readick; Everett Sloane; Paul Stewart; Virginia Welles; Richard Wilson; Eustace Wyatt
- Written by: Orson Welles (writer, script editor); John Houseman (writer, script editor); Howard Koch; Howard Teichmann
- Directed by: Orson Welles; Paul Stewart (rehearsal director)
- Produced by: John Houseman; Orson Welles; Paul Stewart (associate producer)
- Executive producer: Davidson Taylor (for CBS)
- Original release: December 9, 1938 – March 31, 1940
- No. of series: 2
- No. of episodes: 56
- Audio format: Monaural sound
- Opening theme: Piano Concerto No. 1 in B-Flat Minor

The Campbell Playhouse (1938–1940) was a live CBS radio drama series directed by and starring Orson Welles. Produced by Welles and John Houseman, it was a sponsored continuation of The Mercury Theatre on the Air. The series offered hour-long adaptations of classic plays and novels, as well as adaptations of popular motion pictures.

When Welles left at the end of the second season, The Campbell Playhouse changed format as a 30-minute weekly series that ran for one season (1940–41).

== Production ==
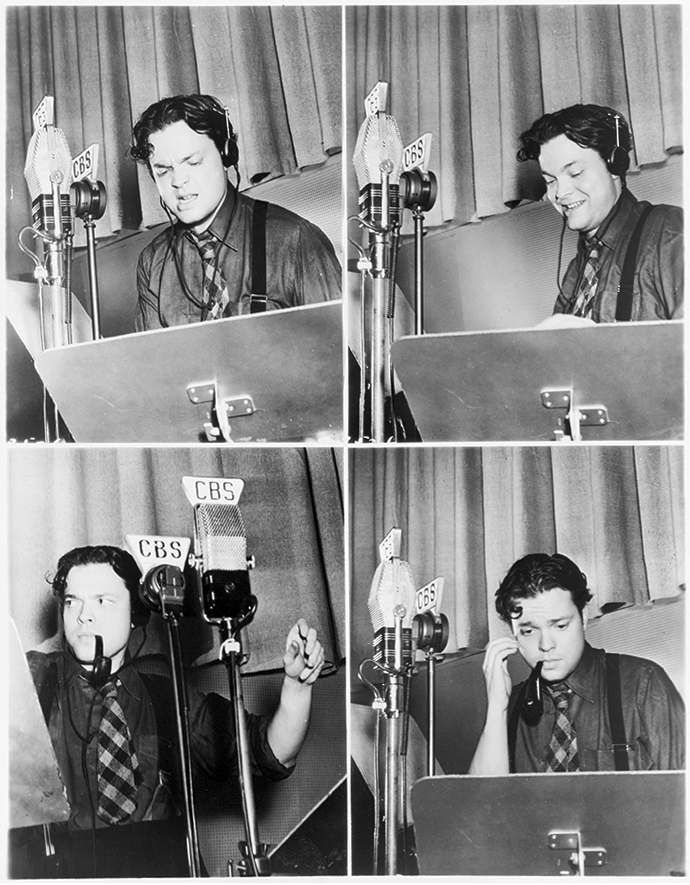
Orson Welles during a rehearsal of The Campbell Playhouse (December 1938)

As a direct result of the front-page headlines Orson Welles generated with his 1938 Halloween production "The War of the Worlds", Campbell's Soup signed on as sponsor. The Mercury Theatre on the Air made its last broadcast December 4, 1938, and The Campbell Playhouse began December 9, 1938.

The series made its debut with Welles's adaptation of Rebecca, with guest stars Margaret Sullavan and Mildred Natwick. The radio drama was the first adaptation of the 1938 novel by Daphne Du Maurier; the author was interviewed live from London at the conclusion of the broadcast.

Bernard Herrmann had time to compose a complete score for "Rebecca". "It was absolutely beautiful," said associate producer Paul Stewart, "and it was the first time to me that Benny was something more than a guy who could write bridges." Herrmann later used the main theme as the basis of his score for the film Jane Eyre.

Although the same creative staff stayed on, the show had a different flavor under sponsorship. This was partially due to a guest star policy which relegated the Mercury Players to supporting roles. There was a growing schism between Welles, still reaping the rewards of his Halloween eve notoriety, and Houseman, who became an employee rather than a partner. Houseman worked primarily as supervising editor on the radio shows.

Howard E. Koch remained on the writing staff through "The Glass Key" (March 10, 1939), when he left for Hollywood. He was succeeded by Howard Teichmann, who wrote for the show for two years.

After signing a film contract with RKO in August 1939, Welles began commuting from Hollywood to New York for the two Sunday broadcasts of The Campbell Playhouse. In November 1939, production of the show moved from New York to Los Angeles.

Screenwriter Herman J. Mankiewicz was put on the Mercury payroll and wrote five scripts for Campbell Playhouse shows broadcast between November 12, 1939, and March 17, 1940. Mankiewicz proved to be useful, particularly working with Houseman as editor. The episode "Mr. Deeds Goes to Town" includes an inside joke: the Viennese doctor asked to certify Deeds insane is named Dr. Herman Mankiewicz.

After an argument over finances December 16, 1939, John Houseman resigned from the Mercury Theatre and returned to New York. Two months later Welles hired him back to work with Mankiewicz on a new venture, Welles's first film project, Citizen Kane.

After 20 shows, Campbell began to exercise more creative control over The Campbell Playhouse, and had complete control over story selection. Diana Bourbon, an account executive from the Ward Wheelock agency, was appointed as liaison between Welles and Campbell. Bourbon acted as de facto producer, and she and Welles frequently clashed over story and casting. One notable dispute came after the broadcast of "Algiers", which employed a carefully crafted tapestry of sound to create the world of the Casbah. Challenged on why the background sounds were so loud, Welles responded, "Who told you it was the background?"

Amiable classics were chosen over many of Welles's story suggestions, including Of Human Hearts; the rights to many works, including Rogue Male, Wuthering Heights and The Little Foxes, could not be obtained. As his contract with Campbell came to an end, Welles determined not to sign on for another season. "I'm sick of having the heart torn out of a script by radio censorship," he said. After the broadcast of March 31, 1940—a reprise of Jane Eyre, after Welles's suggestion of Alice Adams was not accepted—Welles and Campbell parted amicably. The Campbell Playhouse returned to radio November 29, 1940, as a 30-minute weekly CBS series that was last broadcast June 13, 1941. The program was produced by Diana Bourbon. The series' focus shifted away from classic play and novel adaptations to lighter, more popular fare, still with casts drawn from the ranks of film actors.

== Episodes ==
Date	Episode	Notes
December 9, 1938	"Rebecca"	Adapted from the novel by Daphne du Maurier; Cast: Orson Welles (Max de Winter), Margaret Sullavan (Mrs. de Winter), Mildred Natwick (Mrs. Danvers), Ray Collins (Frank Crawley), George Coulouris (Captain Searle), Frank Readick (the Idiot), Alfred Shirley (Frith), Eustace Wyatt (Coroner), Agnes Moorehead (Mrs. Van Hopper); Interview with Daphne du Maurier; Sponsored continuation of The Mercury Theatre on the Air; First adaptation of the novel for any medium Herrmann's score is the basis of his score for the 1943 film, Jane Eyre
December 16, 1938	"Call It a Day"	Adapted from the play by Dodie Smith; Cast: Orson Welles (Roger Hilton), Beatrice Lillie (Dorothy Hilton), Jane Wyatt (Catherine Hilton)
December 23, 1938	"A Christmas Carol"	Adapted from the novella by Charles Dickens; Cast: Orson Welles (Ebenezer Scrooge), Hiram Sherman (Bob Cratchit), Brenda Forbes (Mrs. Cratchit), Arthur Anderson (Ghost of Christmas Past), Eustace Wyatt (Ghost of Christmas Present), Frank Readick (Ghost of Christmas Yet to Come), Alfred Shirley (Marley's Ghost), Joseph Cotten (Scrooge's nephew Fred), Virginia Welles, as Anna Stafford (Belle), Kingsley Colton (Tiny Tim), George Spelldon (Mr. Fezziwig), Alice Frost (Charwoman), Ernest Chappell (Announcer)
December 30, 1938	"A Farewell to Arms"	Adapted from the novel by Ernest Hemingway; Cast: Orson Welles (Frederick Henry), Katharine Hepburn (Catherine)
January 6, 1939	"Counsellor-at-Law"	Adapted from the play by Elmer Rice; Cast: Orson Welles (George Simon), Aline MacMahon (Regina Gordon), Gertrude Berg (Mrs. Lena Simon), Lora Baxter (Mrs. George Simon), Arlene Francis (Mrs. Chapman), Ray Collins (Pete McFadden), Frank Readick (Breitstein), Joseph Cotten (Malone), Everett Sloane (Tedesco), Edgar Barrier (Baird); Remarks by legal advisor Sam Leibowitz
January 13, 1939	"Mutiny on the Bounty"	Adapted from the novel by Charles Nordhoff and James Norman Hall; Cast: Orson Welles (Captain Bligh), Carl Frank (Roger Byam), Joseph Cotten (Fletcher Christian), Ray Collins (Thomas Birkitt), Frank Readick (John Fryer), Myron McCormick (James Morrison), Edgar Barrier (William Purcell), Richard Wilson (Matthew Thompson), William Alland (Mr. Samuel), Memo Holt (Tehani); Welles introduces Dorothy Hall, an amateur radio operator from Queens, Long Island, New York, who helped the 214 residents of Pitcairn Island in July 1938 after false reports of a typhoid epidemic closed the harbor and left them without food and medical supplies
January 20, 1939	"The Chicken Wagon Family"	Adapted from the novel by Barry Benefield; Cast: Orson Welles (Frank Fippany), Burgess Meredith, Ray Collins (Hibbard), Frank Readick, Joseph Cotten, Agnes Moorehead, Everett Sloane, William Alland, Richard Wilson, others
January 27, 1939	"I Lost My Girlish Laughter"	Adapted from the novel by Jane Allen, pseudonym of Silvia Schulman, former secretary to David O. Selznick, and her friend Jane Shore. Selznick made strenuous efforts to prevent this broadcast. Cast: Orson Welles (Sidney Brandt), George S. Kaufman (John Tussler), Ilka Chase (Madge Lawrence), Tamara Geva (Sarya Tarn), Ray Collins (Faye), Frank Readick (Palmer), Everett Sloane (Roy), Edgar Barrier (Bruce Anders), Myron McCormick (Leland Hayward), Agnes Moorehead (Frances Smith), Joseph Cotten (Riley), William Alland (assistant director); Interview with Jane Allen
February 3, 1939	"Arrowsmith"	Adapted from the novel by Sinclair Lewis; Cast: Orson Welles (Martin Arrowsmith), Helen Hayes (Leora Arrowsmith), Ray Collins (Professor Gottlieb), Frank Readick (Sondelius), Al Swenson (Henry Novak), Effie Palmer (Mrs. Tozer), Everette Sloane (Mr. Tozer), Carl Frank (Dr. Stoups)
February 10, 1939	"The Green Goddess"	Adapted from the play by William Archer; Cast: Orson Welles (the Rajah), Madeleine Carroll (Lucilla Crespin), Robert Speaight (Major Crespin), Ray Collins (Dr. Traherne), Eustace Wyatt (Watkins)
February 17, 1939	"Burlesque"	Adapted from the play by Arthur Hopkins and George Manker Watters; Cast: Orson Welles (Skid), Sam Levene (Lefty); Interview with Arthur Hopkins
February 24, 1939	"State Fair"	Adapted from the novel by Philip Duffield Stong; Cast: Orson Welles (Pat), Ray Collins, others Interview with Philip Stong and comics Amos 'n' Andy (Freeman Gosden and Charles Correll)
March 2, 1939	"Royal Regiment"	Adapted from the novel by Gilbert Frankau; Cast: Orson Welles (Tom Rockingham), Mary Astor (Camilla Wethered); with Ray Collins, Alfred Shirley, Everett Sloane, Eustace Wyatt, Howard Teichmann, others Interview with Gilbert Frankau
March 10, 1939	"The Glass Key"	Adapted from the novel by Dashiell Hammett; Cast: Orson Welles (Paul Madvig), Paul Stewart (Ned Beaumont), Ray Collins (Shad O'Rory), Myron McCormick (Senator Henry), Effie Palmer (Mrs. Madvig), Elspeth Eric (Opal Madvig), Elizabeth Morgan (Telephone Operator), Everett Sloane (Farr), Howard Smith (Jeff), Laura Baxter (Janet Henry), Edgar Barrier (Rusty); Interview with Warden Lewis E. Lawes of Sing Sing
March 17, 1939	"Beau Geste"	Adapted from the novel by P. C. Wren; Cast: Orson Welles (Beau Geste), Laurence Olivier (John Geste), Noah Beery (Sergeant Lajaune), Naomi Campbell (Isobel), Isabel Elson (Lady Brandon); Interview with J. Alphonse de Redenet, French Legionnaire
March 24, 1939	"Twentieth Century"	Adapted by Ben Hecht and Charles MacArthur from the play by Charles Bruce Millholland; Cast: Orson Welles (Oscar Jaffe), Elissa Landi (Lily Garland), Sam Levene (Owen O'Malley), Ray Collins (Oliver Webb), Gus Schilling (Max Jacobs), Howard Teichmann (Train Dispatcher), Edgar Kent (Clark), Everett Sloane and Teddy Bergman (the Two Players); Interview with Broadway press agent Richard Maney
March 31, 1939	"Show Boat"	Adapted from the novel by Edna Ferber; Cast: Orson Welles (Captain Andy Hawks), Edna Ferber (Parthy Ann Hawks), Margaret Sullavan (Magnolia), Helen Morgan (Julie), William Johnstone (Gaylord Ravenal), Ray Collins (Windy), Grace Cotten (Kim), Everett Sloane (Schultzy); Interview with Edna Ferber
April 7, 1939	"Les Misérables"	Adapted from the novel by Victor Hugo; Cast: Orson Welles (Javert), Walter Huston (Jean Valjean); with Ray Collins, Everett Sloane, Edgar Barrier, Alice Frost, William Alland, Richard Wilson, others
April 14, 1939	"The Patriot"	Adapted from the novel by Pearl S. Buck; Cast: Orson Welles (I-wan), Anna May Wong (Peony); Interview with Pearl S. Buck
April 21, 1939	"Private Lives"	Adapted from the play by Noël Coward; Cast: Orson Welles (Elyot Chase), Gertrude Lawrence (Amanda Prynne), Naomi Campbell (Sibyl Chase), Robert Speaight (Victor Prynne), Edgar Barrier (Hotel Manager); Interview with Gertrude Lawrence
April 28, 1939	"Black Daniel"	A retelling of Stephen Vincent Benét's The Devil and Daniel Webster, by Honoré Morrow; Cast: Orson Welles (Daniel Webster), Joan Bennett (Carolyn LeRoy); with Ray Collins, Everett Sloane, William Alland, others
May 5, 1939	"Wickford Point"	Adapted from the novel by John P. Marquand; Cast: Orson Welles (Jim Calder); with Agnes Moorehead, Ray Collins, Everett Sloane, Paul Stewart, Carl Frank, others Interview with John P. Marquand
May 12, 1939	"Our Town"	Adapted from the play by Thornton Wilder; Cast: Orson Welles (Stage Manager); with Patricia Newton, Agnes Moorehead, Ray Collins, John Craven, Effie Palmer, Everett Sloane, Parker Fennelly
May 19, 1939	"The Bad Man"	Adapted from the play by Porter Emerson Browne; Cast: Orson Welles (Pancho Lopez), Ida Lupino (Lucia Pell), Frank Readick (Gilbert Phebbs), Ray Collins (Uncle Phipps), William Alland (Morgan Pell), Diana Stevens (Dot), Everett Sloane (Louie), Edward Jerome (Pedro); Interview with Ida Lupino
May 26, 1939	"American Cavalcade"	"The Things We Have", about the great dream of American liberty, by Orson Welles; Cast: Orson Welles (James Scott, Professor Shurtz, O'Shaughnessy, The Limey, John Brown), Cornelia Otis Skinner (Mary Scott, Frau Shurtz, Lady Townsend, Polish woman, Susan B. Anthony); with Frank Readick, Kenneth Delmar, Ray Collins, Agnes Moorehead, Paul Stewart, Kingsley Colton, William Harrigan, Howard Smith; Interview with Cornelia Otis Skinner
June 2, 1939	"Victoria Regina"	Adapted from the play by Laurence Housman; Cast: Orson Welles (Prince Albert), Helen Hayes (Queen Victoria); with Eustace Wyatt, Ray Collins, Brenda Forbes, Agnes Moorehead, Alfred Shirley, Virginia Welles (as Anna Stafford); Interview with Helen Hayes
September 10, 1939	"Peter Ibbetson"	Adapted from the novel by George du Maurier; Cast: Orson Welles (Peter Ibbetson), Helen Hayes (Mary, Duchess of Towers), John Emery (Colonel Ibbetson), Agnes Moorehead (Mrs. Deane), Vera Allen (Madame Seraskier), Everett Sloane (Crockett), Eustace Wyatt (Warden), Ray Collins (Governor), George Coulouris (Chaplain), Edgar Barrier (Judge), Richard Wilson (Turnkey), Kingsley Colton (Peter as a child), Betty Philson (Mary as a child)
September 17, 1939	"Ah, Wilderness!"	Adapted from the play by Eugene O'Neill; Cast: Orson Welles (Richard Miller), Ray Collins (Nat Miller), Arlene Francis (Muriel McComber), Agnes Moorehead (Lily Wilson), Everett Sloane (Sid Davis), Joseph Cotten, Paul Stewart, Richard Wilson, Eda Heinemann, Frank Readick, Joan Tetzel, Ted Reid; Welles introduces a five-minute reminiscence by George Jean Nathan, to whom O'Neill dedicated the play
September 24, 1939	"What Every Woman Knows"	Adapted from the play by J. M. Barrie; Cast: Orson Welles (John Shand), Helen Hayes (Maggie Wylie), Alred Shirley (Alick Sylie), Everett Sloane (David Wylie), Agnes Moorehead (Countess), Naomi Campbell (Lady Sybil), Eustace Wyatt (Mr. Venables), Ray Collins (Willy Cameron)
October 1, 1939	"The Count of Monte Cristo"	Adapted from the novel by Alexandre Dumas; Cast: Orson Welles (Edmond Dantés, the Count), Ray Collins (Caderousse), Everett Sloane (Abbé Faria), Frank Readick (Villefort), George Coulouris (Danglars), Edgar Barrier (Mondego), Richard Wilson (a Jailer), Agnes Moorehead (Mercédès)
October 8, 1939	"Algiers"	Adapted from the screenplay by John Howard Lawson and James M. Cain; Cast: Orson Welles (Pepe Le Moko), Paulette Goddard (Gaby)
October 15, 1939	"Escape"	Adapted from the play by John Galsworthy; Cast: Orson Welles (Matt Denant), Wendy Barrie (Lady in the hotel), Ray Collins (Murdered /cop, Forgiving Judge, Unforgiving Farmer), Jack Smart (another Cop, Farmhand), Edgar Barrier (Priest and Cabbie), Bea Benaderet (Girl in park, Woman at picnic), Harriet Kay (Maid), Mabel Albertson (Bessie), Benny Rubin (Man at picnic)
October 22, 1939	"Liliom"	Adapted from the play by Ferenc Molnár; Cast: Orson Welles (Liliom), Helen Hayes (Julie), Agnes Moorehead (Mrs. Muskat), Joan Tetzell (Marie), Frank Readick (Ficsur), Bill Adams (Sheriff), Joseph Cotten (the Cashier), Betty Philson (Louise)
October 29, 1939	"The Magnificent Ambersons"	Adapted from the novel by Booth Tarkington; Cast: Orson Welles (George Amberson Minafer), Walter Huston (Eugene Morgan), Nan Sunderland (Isabel Amberson), Ray Collins (Fred Amberson), Eric Burtis (Young George Minafer), Marion Burns (Lucy Morgan), Everett Sloane (Archie Malloch Smith), Richard Wilson (Reverend Malloch Smith), Bea Benaderet (Mrs. Foster); Interview with Walter Huston and Nan Sunderlund, Mrs. Walter Huston
November 5, 1939	"The Hurricane"	Adapted from the novel by Charles Nordhoff and James Norman Hall; Cast: Orson Welles (Eugene de Laage), Mary Astor (Germaine de Laage), Ray Collins (Father Paul), Everett Sloane (Captain Nagle), Edgar Barrier (Terangi), Bea Benaderet (Marani), Eric Burgess (Mako)
November 12, 1939	"The Murder of Roger Ackroyd"	Adapted from the novel by Agatha Christie; First of several episodes scripted by Herman J. Mankiewicz; Cast: Orson Welles (Hercule Poirot, Dr. James Sheppard), Edna May Oliver (Caroline Sheppard), Alan Napier (Roger Ackroyd), Brenda Forbes (Mrs. Ackroyd), George Coulouris (Inspector Hempstead), Ray Collins (Mr. Raymond), Everett Sloane (Parker, the butler); Interview with Edna May Oliver
November 19, 1939	"The Garden of Allah"	Adapted from the novel by Robert Hichens; Cast: Orson Welles (Boris Androvsky), Madeleine Carroll (Domini Enfilden), Everett Sloane (Count Anteoni), George Coulouris (Father Roubier), Ray Collins (Lt. de Trevignac)
November 26, 1939	"Dodsworth"	Adapted by Herman J. Mankiewicz from the novel by Sinclair Lewis and the play by Sidney Howard; Cast: Orson Welles (Sam Dodsworth), Fay Bainter (Fran Dodsworth), Nan Sunderland (Edith Cortright), Dennis Green (Major Lockert), Edgar Barrier (Kurt von Obersdorf), Ray Collins (Tubby), Natasha Latische (Mme. de Penalbe), Brenda Forbes (the Baroness); Fay Bainter and Nan Sunderland reprise the roles they created in the original Broadway production
December 3, 1939	"Lost Horizon"	Adapted from the novel by James Hilton; Cast: Orson Welles (Father Perrault/High Lama), Sigrid Gurie (Chinese Woman)
December 10, 1939	"Vanessa"	Adapted from the novel by Hugh Walpole; Cast: Orson Welles (Benjie), Helen Hayes (Vanessa, Judith), Alfred Shirley (Adam), Eustce Wyatt (Uncle Will), Kingsley Colton (Benjie's son)
December 17, 1939	"There's Always a Woman"	Adapted from the screenplay by Gladys Lehman; Last episode scripted by John Houseman; Cast: Orson Welles (Bill Reardon), Marie Wilson (Sally Rerdon), Ray Collins (Nicky Shane), Everett Sloane (Grigson, the butler), Edgar Barrier (Jerry Marlow), Mary Taylor (Lola Fraser), Georgia Backus (Ann Calhoun), Frank Readick (the D.A.), Richard Wilson (Walter Fraser)
December 24, 1939	"A Christmas Carol"	Adapted from the novella by Charles Dickens; Cast: Orson Welles (Narrator), Lionel Barrymore (Ebenezer Scrooge); with Everett Sloane (Marley's Ghost), Frank Readick (Bob Cratchit), Erskine Sanford (Fezziwig), George Coulouris (Ghost of Christmas Present), Ray Collins, Georgia Backus (Mrs. Cratchit), Bea Benaderet (Martha Cratchit), Edgar Barrier.
December 31, 1939	"Come and Get It"	Adapted from the novel by Edna Ferber; Cast: Everett Sloane (Narrator), Orson Welles (Barney), Frances Dee (Lotta)
January 7, 1940	"Vanity Fair"	Adapted from the novel by William Makepeace Thackeray; Scripted by Herman J. Mankiewicz; Cast: Orson Welles (the Marquis), Helen Hayes (Becky Sharp), John Hoysradt (Rawdon Crawley), Agnes Moorehead (Miss Crawley), Naomi Campbell (Amelia Sedley)
January 14, 1940	"Theodora Goes Wild"	Adaptation of an original story by Mary McCarthy and screenplay by Sidney Buchman; Cast: Orson Welles (Michael Grant), Loretta Young (Theodora Lynn), Ray Collins (Jed Waterbury), Mary Taylor (Mrs. Stevenson), Clara Blandick (Aunt Rebecca), Frank Readick (Arthur Stevenson)
January 21, 1940	"The Citadel"	Adapted from the novel by A. J. Cronin; Cast: Orson Welles (Andrew Manson), Geraldine Fitzgerald (Christine), Everett Sloane (Dr. Ivory), Mary Taylor (Mrs. Laurence), Ray Collins (the Rector), Edgar Barrier (Dr. Freedman), George Coulouris (Dr. Denny), Georgia Backus (Mrs. Higgins), Robert Coote (Dr. Fred Hampton)
January 28, 1940	"It Happened One Night"	Adapted from the short story by Samuel Hopkins Adams and motion picture screenplay by Robert Riskin; Cast: Orson Welles (Mr. Andrews), William Powell (Peter Grant), Miriam Hopkins (Ellie Andrews); with Everett Sloane, Ray Collins, John Houseman, Virginia Gordon, Richard Wilson, Benny Rubin
February 4, 1940	"Broome Stages"	Adapted from the novel by Clemence Dane; Cast: Orson Welles (Harry Broome, Edmond Broome), Helen Hayes (Donna Broome), John Hoysradt (Steven Broome)
February 11, 1940	"Mr. Deeds Goes to Town"	Adapted from the story "Opera Hat" by Clarence Budington Kelland and the motion picture screenplay by Robert Riskin; Cast: Orson Welles (Longfellow Deeds), Gertrude Lawrence (Brenda Bennett), Everett Sloane (John Cedar), Paul Stewart (Cornelius Cobb), Frank Readick (the Judge), Edgar Barrier (Mr. Buddington), Agnes Moorehead (a Pixilated Lady), Jane Hauston (a Pixilated Lady), Ernest Chappell (Bailiff), Edwin C. Hill (Ernest Chappell); with Richard Wilson, Howard Teichmann and Joseph Cotten as a number of people
February 18, 1940	"Dinner at Eight"	Adapted from the play by George S. Kaufman and Edna Ferber; Cast: Orson Welles (Dan Packard, Larry Renault), Marjorie Rambeau (Carlotta Vance), Hedda Hopper (Millicent Jordan), Lucille Ball (Kitty Packard), Charles Trowbridge (Oliver Jordan), Clara Blandick (Hattie Loomis), Mary Taylor (Paula Jordan), Edgar Barrier (Dr. Talbot), Benny Rubin (Max, the agent)
February 25, 1940	"Only Angels Have Wings"	Adapted from the story by Howard Hawks and screenplay by Jules Furthman; Cast: Orson Welles (Geoff Carter), Joan Blondell (Bonnie Lee), Regis Toomey (the Kid), Edmond McDonald (Les Peters), Edgar Barrier (Ashton Stevens), George Coulouris (Dutchy), William Alland (Joe Souther), Richard Baer (Tex), Richard Wilson (Pete)
March 3, 1940	"Rabble in Arms"	Adapted from the novel by Kenneth Roberts; Cast: Orson Welles (Benedict Arnold), Frances Dee (Ellen Phipps), George Coulouris (Captain Peter Merrill), Robert Warwick (Captain Nason), Richard Baer (Huck), Edward Donahue (Guy), Richard Wilson (Scott Flick), Georgia Backus (Madame)
March 10, 1940	"Craig's Wife"	Adapted from the play by George Kelly; Cast: Orson Welles (Walter Craig), Ann Harding (Harriet Craig), Janet Beecher (Miss Austen), Mary Taylor (Ethel Landreth), Regis Toomey (Billy Birkmire), Clara Blandick (Mrs. Harold), Bea Benaderet (Mazie), Richard Baer (Policeman)
March 17, 1940	"Huckleberry Finn"	Adapted from the novel by Mark Twain; Scripted by Herman J. Mankiewicz; Cast: Orson Welles (Dauphin, Huckleberry Finn), Jackie Cooper (Huckleberry Finn), Walter Catlett (Duke), Clarence Muse (Jim)
March 24, 1940	"June Moon"	Adapted from the play by Ring Lardner and George S. Kaufman; Cast: Orson Welles (Candy Butcher on train), Jack Benny (Fred Stevens), Benny Rubin (Maxie Schwartz), Gus Schilling (Paul Sears), Bea Benaderet (Lucille Sears), Lee Patrick (Eileen), Virginia Gordon (Edna Baker)
March 31, 1940	"Jane Eyre"	Adapted from the novel by Charlotte Brontë; Cast: Orson Welles (Mr. Rochester), Madeleine Carroll (Jane Eyre), Cecilia Loftus (Mrs. Fairfax), Robert Coote (Mr. Brocklehurst), Serita Whooton (Young Jane), George Coulouris (the Innkeeper), Edgar Barrier (the Priest)

== TV series ==
The Campbell Playhouse is also the title of an American anthology series and television drama that aired on NBC June 6, 1952 – May 28, 1954. Sponsored by the Campbell Soup Company, the series also aired under the title Campbell Soundstage. In June 1954 the title of the series was changed to Campbell Summer Soundstage, and filmed presentations (many previously aired on Ford Theatre) were featured until the show left the air in September 1954.

== See also ==
- Academy Award Theater
- Author's Playhouse
- Cavalcade of America
- CBS Radio Workshop
- The Cresta Blanca Hollywood Players
- Curtain Time
- Ford Theatre
- General Electric Theater
- Lux Radio Theater
- The Mercury Theatre on the Air
- The MGM Theater of the Air
- Screen Director's Playhouse
- The Screen Guild Theater
- Suspense
- Stars over Hollywood (radio program)
- Theater Guild on the Air
