= The Screen Guild Theater =

American radio series

- Jack Benny, George Murphy, Joan Crawford and Reginald Gardiner on the premiere of The Screen Guild Theater (January 8, 1939)
- Other names: The Gulf Screen Guild Show; The Gulf Screen Guild Theater; The Lady Esther Screen Guild Theater; The Camel Screen Guild Players; Stars in the Air; Hollywood Sound Stage; Hollywood On Stage
- Genre: Anthology drama
- Running time: 30 minutes; 60 minutes (1950–51)
- Country of origin: United States
- Language: English
- Home station: CBS (1939–48); NBC (1948–50); ABC (1950–51); CBS (1951–52)
- Hosted by: George Murphy (1939); Roger Pryor (1940–52)
- Announcer: John Conte (Gulf Oil, 1939–42); Truman Bradley (Lady Esther Cosmetics, 1942–47); Michael Roy (Camel, 1947–50)
- Written by: Bill Hampton; Harry Kronman
- Directed by: Bill Lawrence
- Produced by: Bill Lawrence
- Original release: January 8, 1939 – June 29, 1952
- No. of series: 14
- No. of episodes: 527
- Audio format: Monaural sound

The Screen Guild Theater is a radio anthology series broadcast from 1939 until 1952 during the Golden Age of Radio. Leading Hollywood stars performed adaptations of popular motion pictures. Originating on CBS Radio, it aired under several different titles including The Gulf Screen Guild Show, The Gulf Screen Guild Theater, The Lady Esther Screen Guild Theater and The Camel Screen Guild Players. Fees that would ordinarily have been paid to the stars and studios were instead donated to the Motion Picture Relief Fund, and were used for the construction and maintenance of the Motion Picture Country House.

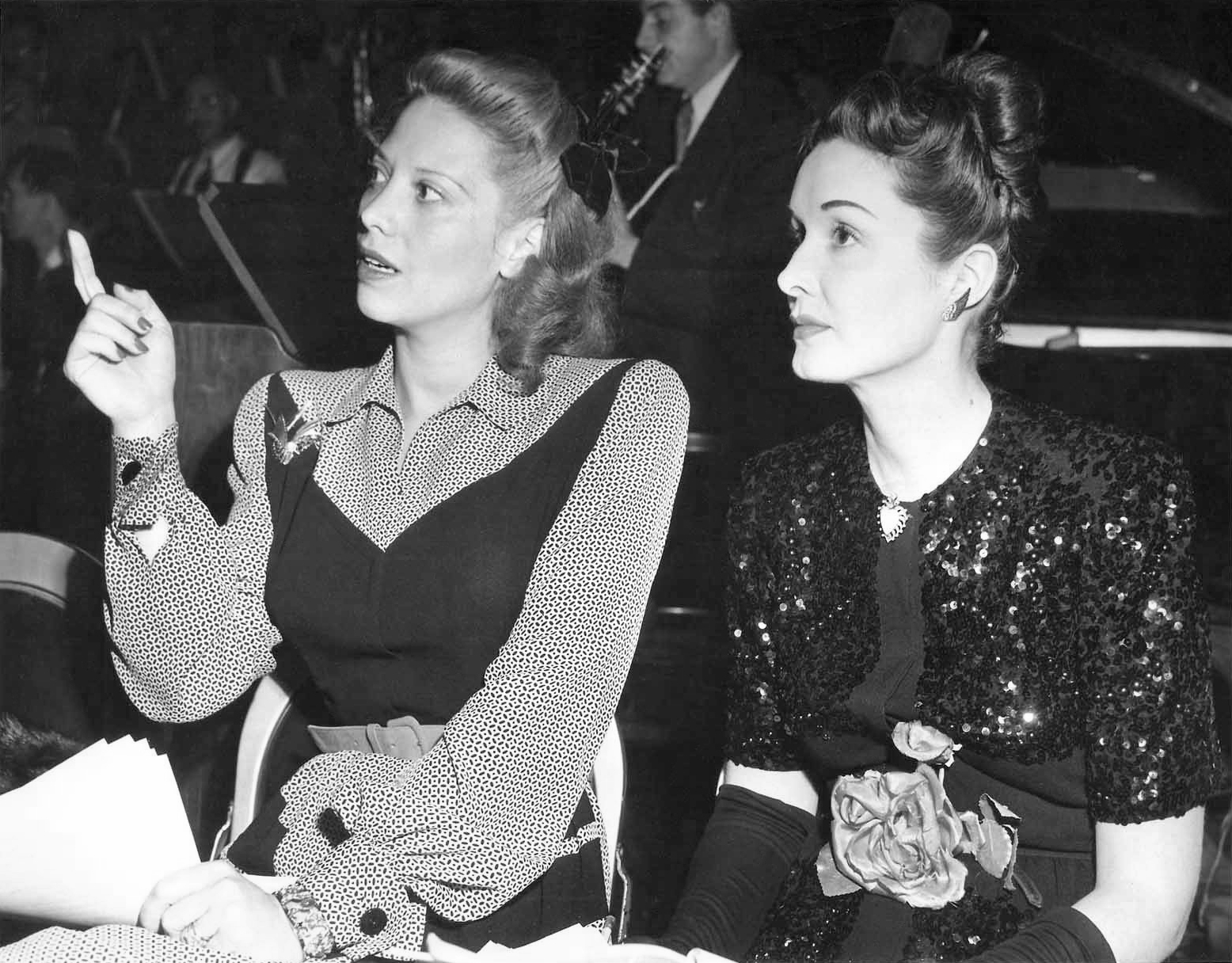
Dinah Shore and Gail Patrick in the CBS Radio studio at a rehearsal for "Belle of the Yukon" (February 12, 1945)

== Production ==
"Columbia Broadcasting System presented the first network radio broadcast of the Screen Guild Show on Sunday, January 8, 1939, at 4:30 Pacific Time." - Special Research Collections, UC Santa Barbara Library

The Screen Guild Theater had a long run, lasting 14 seasons and 527 episodes. Actors on the series included Ethel Barrymore, Lionel Barrymore, Ingrid Bergman, Humphrey Bogart, Eddie Cantor, Gary Cooper, Bing Crosby, Bette Davis, Jimmy Durante, Nelson Eddy, Douglas Fairbanks Jr., Clark Gable, Judy Garland, Gene Kelly, Sam Levene, Johnny Mercer, Agnes Moorehead, Dennis Morgan, Gregory Peck, Fred Astaire, Frank Sinatra, Shirley Temple, and Dinah Shore.

The series began with a variety format, with mixed success. The program increasingly came to rely on adaptations of major motion pictures—presenting a considerable challenge to writers who had to compress the narrative into 22 minutes.

Fees these actors would typically charge were donated to the Motion Picture Relief Fund, in order to support the creation and maintenance of the Motion Picture Country Home for retired actors. A 1940 magazine article noted that The Screen Guild Theater was "the only sponsored program on the air which gives all its profits to charity." Nearly $800,000 had been contributed by the summer of 1942.

The first three seasons of the CBS series were sponsored by Gulf Oil. With uncertainties in the oil market due to World War II, Gulf dropped the show, and in 1942 the Lady Esther cosmetics corporation assumed sponsorship. The Lady Esther Screen Guild Theater was consistently one of the top ten radio programs. Reverses in the cosmetics industry led Lady Esther to withdraw in 1947, and Camel Cigarettes purchased a three-year contract. Changing time slots and networks brought about a decline in ratings. In the fall of 1950, the series returned to CBS, where it ran until its final broadcast June 30, 1952. The Screen Guild Theater earned a total of $5,235,607 for the Motion Picture Relief Fund.

== Notable broadcasts ==
"A table of highlights would run many pages", wrote radio historian John Dunning, who lists the following notable Screen Guild broadcasts:

- The Blue Bird with Shirley Temple and Nelson Eddy (December 24, 1939)
- High Sierra with Humphrey Bogart (January 4, 1942)
- Sergeant York with Gary Cooper and Walter Brennan (January 19, 1942)
- Yankee Doodle Dandy with James Cagney, Rita Hayworth and Betty Grable (October 19, 1942)
- Command Decision with Clark Gable, Walter Pidgeon, Van Johnson, John Hodiak, Edward Arnold and Brian Donlevy (March 3, 1949)

Shirley Temple's parents declined an offer of $35,000 for her to perform a radio version of The Blue Bird on a commercial broadcast; instead, she presented it on the Screen Guild program without payment. An attempt was made on her life during the show. As Temple was singing "Someday You'll Find Your Bluebird", a woman in the audience rose from her seat and pulled out a handgun, pointing it directly at her. The woman hesitated and was disarmed. It was later discovered that she had lost a child on the day it was publicly stated that Temple was born, and blamed her for stealing her daughter's soul.

During its 1950–51 season on ABC, the series was expanded to an hour.

At least 364 episodes at the Internet Archive, and 97 disc recordings (at UCSB) of broadcasts include:

- Twelve O'Clock High with Gregory Peck, Ward Bond, Reed Hadley, Millard Mitchell, John Kellogg and Hugh Marlowe (September 7, 1950)
- Ninotchka with Joan Fontaine and William Powell (September 14, 1950)
- Champagne for Caesar with Ronald Colman, Vincent Price, Audrey Totter, Barbara Britton and Art Linkletter (October 5, 1950)
- Tell It to the Judge with Rosalind Russell and Robert Cummings (November 2, 1950)
- Birth of the Blues with Bing Crosby, Dinah Shore and Phil Harris (January 18, 1951)

== Broadcast history ==
The Screen Guild Theater was hosted by George Murphy in 1939, and Roger Pryor for the remainder of its Gulf-sponsored run.

- CBS (January 8, 1939 – June 28, 1948), as:

- The Gulf Screen Guild Show (1939–40),
- The Gulf Screen Guild Theater (1940–42),
- The Lady Esther Screen Guild Theater (1942–47), and
- The Camel Screen Guild Players (1947–48)

- NBC (October 7, 1948 – June 29, 1950), as The Camel Screen Guild Players
- ABC (September 7, 1950 – May 31, 1951), as The Screen Guild Players
- CBS (December 13, 1951 – June 14, 1952), as Stars in the Air
- CBS (December 13, 1951 – March 6, 1952), as Hollywood Sound Stage and Hollywood On Stage
- CBS (March 13–June 29, 1952), as The Screen Guild Theater
- AFRS Playhouse 25
- AFRTS Screen Guild Theatre
- AFRS The Frontline Theatre
- AFRS The Globe Theatre (hosted by Herbert Marshall)
- AFRTS Hollywood Sound Stage

== See also ==
- Academy Award
- Author's Playhouse
- The Campbell Playhouse
- Cavalcade of America
- The CBS Radio Workshop
- The Cresta Blanca Hollywood Players
- Curtain Time
- Ford Theatre
- General Electric Theater
- Hollywood Playhouse
- Lux Radio Theater
- The Mercury Theatre on the Air
- The MGM Theater of the Air
- Screen Director's Playhouse
- Stars over Hollywood (radio program)
- Suspense
- The United States Steel Hour
