= Ford Theatre =

Television and radio series

Ford Theater
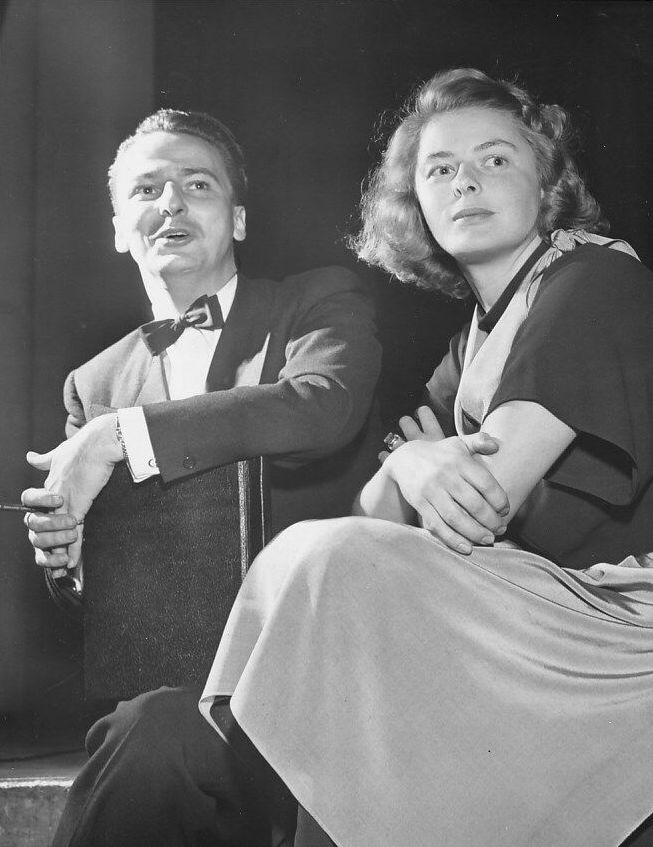
- Director Fletcher Markle and Ingrid Bergman prepare for the Ford Theatre adaptation of Anna Christie that aired on CBS Radio January 21, 1949
- Genre: Anthology drama
- Running time: 1 hour
- Country of origin: United States
- Language: English
- Home station: NBC (10/05/47–06/27/48); CBS (10/08/48–07/01/49)
- TV adaptations: Ford Theatre
- Hosted by: NBC: Howard Lindsay; CBS: Nelson Case
- Starring: NBC: Numerous radio actors CBS: Numerous Hollywood stars
- Written by: NBC: Will Glickman, Charles Gussman, Lillian Schoen, Stanley Evans; CBS: Hugh Kemp, Brainerd Duffield
- Directed by: NBC: George Zachary; CBS: Fletcher Markle
- Recording studio: NBC: New York City; CBS: Hollywood
- No. of series: 2
- No. of episodes: 78
- Audio format: Monaural sound

Ford Theatre, spelled Ford Theater for the original radio version and known, in full, as The Ford Television Theatre for the TV version, is a radio and television anthology series broadcast in the United States in the 1940s and 1950s. At various times the television series appeared on all three major television networks, while the radio version was broadcast on two separate networks and on two separate coasts. Ford Theatre was named for its sponsor, the Ford Motor Company, which had an earlier success with its concert music series, The Ford Sunday Evening Hour (1934–42).

== Radio ==
Ford Theater as a radio series lasted for only two seasons. Its first season was broadcast from New York City on NBC with such actors as Ed Begley, Shirley Booth, Gary Merrill, Everett Sloane and Vicki Vola. This season ran from October 5, 1947, to June 27, 1948. Due to poor ratings, Ford moved the show to Hollywood and CBS Radio for the second season, where top Hollywood actors headed the casts. This season, which lasted from October 8, 1948, to July 1, 1949, received much higher ratings. However, with television rising in popularity, Ford decided to end its radio show and focus solely on television.

Howard Lindsay became the program's master of ceremonies on October 5, 1947.

== Television ==
The Ford Television Theatre
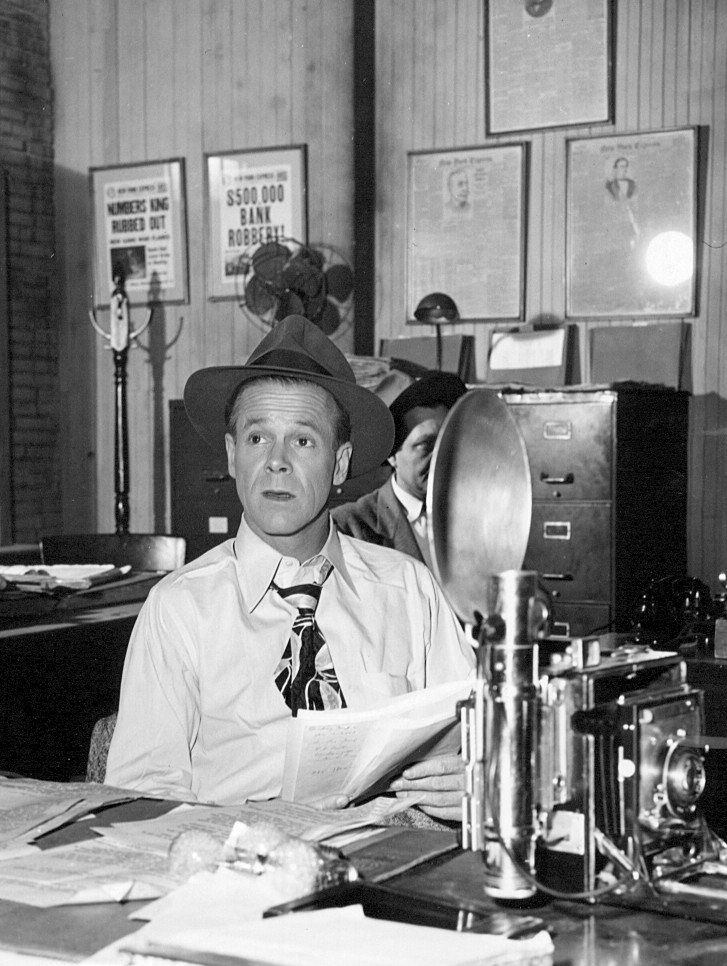
- Dan Duryea in the presentation of Double Exposure, 1953
- Country of origin: United States
- No. of seasons: 8
- No. of episodes: 245

Production
- Running time: 24–26 minutes
- Production companies: Ford Motor Company (live episodes); Screen Gems Television (filmed episodes)

Original release
- Network: CBS (1948–1951); NBC (1952–1956); ABC (1956–1957)
- Release: October 17, 1948 – June 26, 1957

The first Ford Theatre on U.S. television appeared on October 17, 1948, near the beginning of regularly scheduled prime time network programming. It was an hour-long drama, broadcast live, as was most television of the era. This series used primarily Broadway actors. The program began as a monthly series, switching to biweekly a year later, in alternation on Friday nights at 9:00 pm Eastern time with the 54th Street Revue. During this period, programming included adaptations of Little Women, with June Lockhart and Kim Hunter, and One Sunday Afternoon, with Burgess Meredith and Hume Cronyn. During the following season, the final season for the program on CBS, the alternation in the same time slot was with Magnavox Theater. Garth Montgomery was the producer, with Carl Beier as associate producer. Franklin Schaffner was the director.

A half-hour filmed Ford Theatre returned to the airwaves on NBC for the 1951–52 season on Thursday nights at 9:30 pm Eastern. At this time, production was moved from New York to Hollywood, and featured actors based there rather than on Broadway. Some of these programs were comedies instead of dramas. Performers appearing during this era included Frank Bank, Scott Brady, Claudette Colbert, Charles Coburn, Ed Hinton, Vivi Janiss, Peter Lawford, Sam Levene, Ida Lupino, Thomas Mitchell, Dennis Morgan, Karen Sharpe, Ann Sheridan, Barry Sullivan, and Beverly Washburn. Also appearing for the first time together were Ronald Reagan and Nancy Davis, in an episode entitled "First Born," which first aired on February 3, 1953. In October 1954, Ford Theatre became the first network television series to be filmed regularly in color. During this period, Ford Theatre finished in the Nielsen ratings at number 30 for the 1952–1953 season, number seven in 1953–1954, number 9 in 1954–1955, and number 13 in 1955–1956.

After four seasons on NBC, the program was shown for a final season on ABC during the 1956–57 season. The time slot was changed to Wednesdays at 9:30 pm. The last prime time broadcast of Ford Theatre was on July 10, 1957.

From 9:00 to 9:30 p.m. on Saturdays during the summer of 1958, NBC broadcast the anthology series Opening Night, which consisted entirely of reruns of episodes of Ford Theatre from the 1956–1957 season. First aired on June 14, 1958, Opening Night was broadcast every other week, alternating in its time slot with Club Oasis with Spike Jones. Its final episode aired on September 8, 1958.

In 1954, Billboard voted Ford Theatre the best filmed network television drama series.

=== Episodes ===
==== Season 1 (1948–49) ====
| No. overall | No. in season | Title | Directed by | Written by | Original release date |
|---|---|---|---|---|---|
| 1 | 1 | "Years Ago" | Marc Daniels | Ruth Gordon | October 17, 1948 |
| 2 | 2 | "Joy To The World" | Franklin J. Schaffner | Alan Scott and George Haight | November 21, 1948 |
| 3 | 3 | "Night Must Fall" | Marc Daniels | Story by : Emlyn Williams; Teleplay by : Norman Lessing | December 19, 1948 |
| 4 | 4 | "The Man Who Came To Dinner" | Marc Daniels | Story by : George S. Kaufman and Moss Hart; Teleplay by : Max Wilk and Ellis Marcus | January 16, 1949 |
| 5 | 5 | "The Silver Cord" | Marc Daniels | Sidney Howard | February 13, 1949 |
| 6 | 6 | "Outward Bound" | Marc Daniels | Sutton Vane | March 13, 1949 |
| 7 | 7 | "Arsenic And Old Lace" | Marc Daniels | Joseph Kesselring | April 11, 1949 |
| 8 | 8 | "One Sunday Afternoon" | Marc Daniels | James Hagan | May 16, 1949 |

==== Season 2 (1949–50) ====
| No. overall | No. in season | Title | Directed by | Written by | Original release date |
|---|---|---|---|---|---|
| 9 | 1 | "The Twentieth Century" | Marc Daniels | Story by : Charles Bruce Millholland, Ben Hecht, and Charles MacArthur; Teleplay by : Norman Lessing | October 7, 1949 |
| 10 | 2 | "On Borrowed Time" | Unknown | Story by : Paul Osborn and Lawrence Edward Watkin; Teleplay by : | October 21, 1949 |
| 11 | 3 | "She Loves Me Not" | Marc Daniels | Story by : Edward Hope and Howard Lindsay; Teleplay by : Max Wilk | November 4, 1949 |
| 12 | 4 | "Skylark" | Unknown | Story by : Samson Raphaelson; Teleplay by : | November 18, 1949 |
| 13 | 5 | "Kind Lady" | Marc Daniels | Story by : Edward Chodorov; Teleplay by : Ellis Marcus | December 2, 1949 |
| 14 | 6 | "Little Women" | Marc Daniels | Story by : Louisa May Alcott; Teleplay by : Ellis Marcus | December 9, 1949 |
| 15 | 7 | "The Farmer Takes a Wife" | Unknown | Story by : Marc Connelly and Frank Ball Elser; Teleplay by : | December 30, 1949 |
| 16 | 8 | "The Barker" | Marc Daniels | Story by : Kenyon Nicholson; Teleplay by : | January 13, 1950 |
| 17 | 9 | "Laburnum Grove" | Unknown | Story by : J.B. Priestley; Teleplay by : Edward Mabley | January 29, 1950 |
| 18 | 10 | "The Royal Family" | Unknown | Story by : Edna Ferber and George S. Kaufman; Teleplay by : | February 10, 1950 |
| 19 | 11 | "Uncle Harry" | Unknown | Story by : Thomas Job; Teleplay by : | February 24, 1950 |
| 20 | 12 | "Room Service" | Unknown | Story by : John Murray and Allen Boretz; Teleplay by : | March 10, 1950 |
| 21 | 13 | "Dear Brutus" | Unknown | Story by : J.M. Barrie; Teleplay by : | March 24, 1950 |
| 22 | 14 | "The Little Minister" | Unknown | Story by : J.M. Barrie; Teleplay by : | April 7, 1950 |
| 23 | 15 | "The School for Scandal" | Unknown | Story by : Richard B. Sheridan; Teleplay by : | April 21, 1950 |
| 24 | 16 | "Father Malachy's Miracle" | Unknown | Story by : Bruce Marshall; Teleplay by : | May 5, 1950 |
| 25 | 17 | "Subway Express" | Marc Daniels | Story by : Eva May Flint and Martha Madison; Teleplay by : Ellis Marcus | May 19, 1950 |
| 26 | 18 | "The Shining Hour" | Unknown | Story by : Keith Winter; Teleplay by : | June 2, 1950 |
| 27 | 19 | "On Borrowed Time" | Unknown | Story by : Paul Osborn and Lawrence Edward Watkin; Teleplay by : | June 30, 1950 |

==== Season 3 (1950–51) ====
| No. overall | No. in season | Title | Directed by | Written by | Original release date |
|---|---|---|---|---|---|
| 28 | 1 | "The Traitor" | Franklin J. Schaffner | Story by : Herman Wouk; Teleplay by : Jack Kirkland | September 8, 1950 |
| 29 | 2 | "The Married Look" | Franklin J. Schaffner | Story by : Robert Nathan; Teleplay by : Howard Rodman | September 22, 1950 |
| 30 | 3 | "The Marble Faun" | Franklin J. Schaffner | Story by : Nathaniel Hawthorne; Teleplay by : David Davidson | October 6, 1950 |
| 31 | 4 | "Angel Street" | Franklin J. Schaffner | Story by : Patrick Hamilton; Teleplay by : Lois Jacoby | October 20, 1950 |
| 32 | 5 | "Heart of Darkness" | Franklin J. Schaffner | Story by : Joseph Conrad; Teleplay by : Joseph Liss | November 3, 1950 |
| 33 | 6 | "The White-Headed Boy" | Franklin J. Schaffner | Story by : Lennox Robinson; Teleplay by : Willard Keefe | November 17, 1950 |
| 34 | 7 | "Another Darling" | Franklin J. Schaffner | Story by : Zoe Akins and Lewis Carroll; Teleplay by : Nancy Moore | December 1, 1950 |
| 35 | 8 | "Alice in Wonderland" | Franklin J. Schaffner | Story by : Lewis Carroll; Teleplay by : Lois Jacoby | December 14, 1950 |
| 36 | 9 | "Cause for Suspicion" | Franklin J. Schaffner | Story by : Peggy Lamson; Teleplay by : Joseph Liss | December 29, 1950 |
| 37 | 10 | "The Presentation of the Look Magazine TV Awards" | Unknown | Story by : Teleplay by : | January 12, 1951 |
| 38 | 11 | "Final Copy" | Franklin J. Schaffner | Jay Barbette | January 26, 1951 |
| 39 | 12 | "Spring Again" | Franklin J. Schaffner | Story by : Bertram Bloch and Isabel Leighton; Teleplay by : Lois Jacoby | February 9, 1951 |
| 40 | 13 | "The Golden Mouth" | Franklin J. Schaffner | Story by : Charles Belden and Frederick Stephani; Teleplay by : Joseph Liss | February 23, 1951 |
| 41 | 14 | "The Ghost Patrol" | Franklin J. Schaffner | Story by : Sinclair Lewis; Teleplay by : William Kendall Clarke | March 9, 1951 |
| 42 | 15 | "Heart of Darkness (restaged)" | Franklin J. Schaffner | Story by : Joseph Conrad; Teleplay by : Joseph Liss | March 23, 1951 |
| 43 | 16 | "Ticket to Oblivion" | Franklin J. Schaffner | Story by : Robert Packer; Teleplay by : George Oppenheimer | April 6, 1951 |
| 44 | 17 | "The Touchstone" | Franklin J. Schaffner | Story by : Edith Wharton; Teleplay by : Lois Jacoby and Jerome Ross | April 20, 1951 |
| 45 | 18 | "Dead on the Vine" | Franklin J. Schaffner | Story by : Alice Fellows; Teleplay by : Joseph Liss | May 4, 1951 |
| 46 | 19 | "Peter Ibbetson" | Franklin J. Schaffner | Story by : George L. Du Maurier; Teleplay by : Lois Jacoby | May 18, 1951 |
| 47 | 20 | "Three in a Room" | Franklin J. Schaffner | Story by : Walter Karig; Teleplay by : George Oppenheimer | June 1, 1951 |
| 48 | 21 | "Night over London" | Franklin J. Schaffner | Story by : Kay Boyle; Teleplay by : David Davidson | June 15, 1951 |
| 49 | 22 | "The Ghost Patrol" | Franklin J. Schaffner | Story by : Sinclair Lewis; Teleplay by : William Kendall Clarke | June 29, 1951 |

==== Season 4 (1952–53) ====
| No. overall | No. in season | Title | Directed by | Written by | Original release date |
|---|---|---|---|---|---|
| 50 | 1 | "Life, Liberty and Orrin Dooley" | Robert Stevenson | Story by : William Fuller; Teleplay by : Mary C. McCall Jr. | October 2, 1952 |
| 51 | 2 | "Junior" | Leigh Jason | Story by : Charles S. Belden and Frederick Stephani; Teleplay by : Cyril Hume | October 9, 1952 |
| 52 | 3 | "National Honeymoon" | James Neilson | Story by : Teleplay by : Paul Horgan, Robert Riley Crutcher, and Elizabeth Reinhardt | October 16, 1952 |
| 53 | 4 | "Birth of a Hero" | Robert Stevenson | Story by : Teleplay by : Lillie Hayward | October 23, 1952 |
| 54 | 5 | "Girl in the Park" | Robert Stevenson | Story by : Rachel Maddux; Teleplay by : Sheridan Gibney | October 30, 1952 |
| 55 | 6 | "Edge of the Law" | Fletcher Markle | Story by : Richard Deming; Teleplay by : Charles Bennett | November 6, 1952 |
| 56 | 7 | "Protect Her Honor" | James Neilson | Story by : Teleplay by : George W. George, Mary C. McCall Jr., and George F. Slavin | November 13, 1952 |
| 57 | 8 | "Sunk" | Robert Stevenson | Story by : George F. Worts; Teleplay by : Merwin Gerard and Seeleg Lester | November 20, 1952 |
| 58 | 9 | "The Divided Heart" | Fletcher Markle | Story by : Frederick Hazlitt Brennan; Teleplay by : Elizabeth Reinhardt | November 27, 1952 |
| 59 | 10 | "Something Old, Something New" | James Neilson | Story by : Dorothy Francis Canfield Fisher and Carl Leo Gass; Teleplay by : Mary C. McCall Jr. and Margaret Buell Wilder | December 4, 1952 |
| 60 | 11 | "Crossed and Double Crossed" | Richard Quine | Story by : Mortimer Braus; Teleplay by : Mortimer Braus | December 11, 1952 |
| 61 | 12 | "So Many Things Happen" | James Neilson | Story by : George W. George and George F. Slavin; Teleplay by : Berne Giler | December 18, 1952 |
| 62 | 13 | "Heart of Gold" | Robert Stevenson | Story by : Nathaniel Hawthorne; Teleplay by : Edward Hope | December 25, 1952 |
| 63 | 14 | "They Also Serve" | Laslo Benedek | Story by : William T. Tilden; Teleplay by : Edward Hope | January 3, 1953 |
| 64 | 15 | "It Happened in a Pawn Shop" | Richard Quine | Story by : Robert Harari; Teleplay by : Frederick Brady | January 8, 1953 |
| 65 | 16 | "This Is My Heart" | Robert Stevenson | Story by : Lenore J. Coffee; Teleplay by : Louella MacFarlane | January 15, 1953 |
| 66 | 17 | "The Sermon of the Gun" | George Archainbaud | Story by : George Sessions Perry; Teleplay by : Lawrence Kimble | January 22, 1953 |
| 67 | 18 | "Adventure in Connecticut" | Victor Stoloff | Story by : Albert Duffy; Teleplay by : Jerome Gruskin | January 29, 1953 |
| 68 | 19 | "The First Born" | James Neilson | Story by : Marion Valensi; Teleplay by : Karen DeWolf | February 5, 1953 |
| 69 | 20 | "The Old Man's Bride" | Victor Stoloff | Story by : Teleplay by : Jerome Gruskin and Edward Hope | February 12, 1953 |
| 70 | 21 | "Margin for Fear" | James Neilson | Story by : Leslie T. White; Teleplay by : Berne Giler | February 19, 1953 |
| 71 | 22 | "All's Fair in Love" | Leigh Jason | Story by : Doris Peel; Teleplay by : Karen DeWolf | February 26, 1953 |
| 72 | 23 | "Madame 44" | James Nelson | Story by : Teleplay by : John Tucker Battle | March 5, 1953 |
| 73 | 24 | "My Daughter's Husband" | Edward Bernds | Story by : Teleplay by : Sumner Arthur Long | March 12, 1953 |
| 74 | 25 | "The Bet" | Jules Bricken | Story by : Anton Chekhov; Teleplay by : Theodore St. John | March 19, 1953 |
| 75 | 26 | "Double Exposure" | Lew Landers | Story by : Ben Hecht and John D. Weaver; Teleplay by : Frederick Brady | March 26, 1953 |
| 76 | 27 | "To Any Soldier" | Ted Post | Story by : Teleplay by : Robert Hardy Andrews | April 2, 1953 |
| 77 | 28 | "Just What the Doctor Ordered" | Ted Post | Story by : Hilda Cole Espy; Teleplay by : Karen DeWolf | April 9, 1953 |
| 78 | 29 | "Allison, Ltd." | James Neilson | Story by : Teleplay by : Karen DeWolf and Catherine Turney | April 16, 1953 |
| 79 | 30 | "The Life of the Party" | Lewis Allen | Story by : David Karp and Clarence Budington Kelland; Teleplay by : Jerome Gruskin | April 23, 1953 |
| 80 | 31 | "The Son-in-Law" | James Neilson | Story by : John Kendrick Bangs; Teleplay by : Karen DeWolf | April 30, 1953 |
| 81 | 32 | "The Lady and the Champ" | Jules Bricken | Story by : George W. George and George F. Slavin; Teleplay by : Joe Pagano | May 7, 1953 |
| 82 | 33 | "Look for Tomorrow" | James Neilson | Story by : Gladys S. Finke; Teleplay by : Jerry Sackheim | May 14, 1953 |
| 83 | 34 | "Sweet Talk Me, Jackson" | Edward Bernds | Story by : Douglass Welch; Teleplay by : Karen DeWolf | May 21, 1953 |
| 84 | 35 | "The Jewel" | James Neilson | Story by : Lawrence L. Goldman; Teleplay by : Jerome Gruskin | May 28, 1953 |
| 85 | 36 | "There's No Place Like Home" | Ted Post | Story by : Sumner Arthur Long; Teleplay by : Sumner Arthur Long | June 4, 1953 |
| 86 | 37 | "The Trestle" | Jules Bricken | Story by : Lawrence L. Goldman; Teleplay by : Jerome Gruskin | June 11, 1953 |
| 87 | 38 | "Malaya Incident" | John Brahm | Story by : Adele Comandini; Teleplay by : Adele Comandini | June 18, 1953 |
| 88 | 39 | "The People Versus Johnston" | Arthur Dreifuss | Story by : Arthur Dreifuss; Teleplay by : Jerome Gruskin | June 25, 1953 |

==== Season 5 (1953–54) ====
| No. overall | No. in season | Title | Directed by | Written by | Original release date |
|---|---|---|---|---|---|
| 89 | 1 | "Tangier Lady" | Ted Post | Story by : Jack Harvey and Sol Shor; Teleplay by : Karen DeWolf | October 1, 1953 |
| 90 | 2 | "The Doctor's Downfall" | Ted Post | Story by : Teleplay by : Karen DeWolf | October 8, 1953 |
| 91 | 3 | "Emergency" | Ted Post | Story by : Teleplay by : | October 15, 1953 |
| 92 | 4 | "The Bachelor" | Laslo Benedek | Story by : Martin Donisthorpe Armstrong and Decla Dunning; Teleplay by : Karen DeWolf and Decla Dunning | October 22, 1953 |
| 93 | 5 | "Tomorrow's Men" | James Neilson | Story by : Bill Scott; Teleplay by : Karen DeWolf | October 29, 1953 |
| 94 | 6 | "The World's My Oyster" | Frederick Stephani | Story by : Berne Giler and Ben Hecht; Teleplay by : Sig Herzig and Frederick Stephani | November 5, 1953 |
| 95 | 7 | "The Ming Lama" | Ted Post | Story by : Teleplay by : Michael Kraike | November 12, 1953 |
| 96 | 8 | "As the Flame Dies" | James Neilson | Story by : Herbert Little Jr. and David Victor; Teleplay by : Herbert Little Jr., Jerry Sackheim, and David Victor | November 19, 1953 |
| 97 | 9 | "Double Bet" | Frederick Stephani | Story by : Dorian Weiler and Miriam Weiler; Teleplay by : Karen DeWolf | November 26, 1953 |
| 98 | 10 | "Kiss and Forget" | James Neilson | Story by : Teleplay by : Jerome Gruskin | December 3, 1953 |
| 99 | 11 | "And Suddenly, You Knew" | Ted Post | Story by : Spencer Raymond and Luci Ward; Teleplay by : Lillie Hayward | December 10, 1953 |
| 100 | 12 | "Gun Job" | Ted Post | Story by : Thomas Thompson; Teleplay by : Jerry Sackheim | December 17, 1953 |
| 101 | 13 | "Ever Since the Day" | Frederick Stephani | Story by : Joseph Russell; Teleplay by : Mary C. McCall Jr. | December 24, 1953 |
| 102 | 14 | "Alias Nora Hale" | James Neilson | Story by : Teleplay by : Jerry Sackheim | December 31, 1953 |
| 103 | 15 | "The Fugitives" | Phil Karlson | Story by : Sigman Byrd; Teleplay by : Robert Hardy Andrews | January 7, 1954 |
| 104 | 16 | "The Ardent Woodsman" | James Neilson | Story by : Hugh B. Cave; Teleplay by : Karen DeWolf | January 14, 1954 |
| 105 | 17 | "The Happiest Day" | James Neilson | Story by : William Rutherford Coe; Teleplay by : Lillie Hayward and Jerry Sackheim | January 21, 1954 |
| 106 | 18 | "Mantrap" | James Neilson | Story by : Steve McNeil; Teleplay by : Lou Breslow | January 28, 1954 |
| 107 | 19 | "Lucky Tommy Jordan" | Ted Post | Story by : Richard Donn; Teleplay by : Robert Hardy Andrews | February 4, 1954 |
| 108 | 20 | "For the Love of Kitty" | Unknown | Story by : Damon Runyon; Teleplay by : Berne Giler | February 11, 1954 |
| 109 | 21 | "For Value Received" | Arnold Laven | Story by : Mildred Cram and Edith Barnard Delano; Teleplay by : Erna Lazarus | February 18, 1954 |
| 110 | 22 | "Marriageable Male" | Ted Post | Story by : Irving Gaynor Neiman; Teleplay by : Lou Breslow and Karen DeWolf | February 25, 1954 |
| 111 | 23 | "The Good of His Soul" | James Nelson | Story by : Jean Heavey; Teleplay by : Edward Hope | March 4, 1954 |
| 112 | 24 | "Come On, Red" | Richard Quine | Story by : John B. Hymer; Teleplay by : Sumner Arthur Long | March 11, 1954 |
| 113 | 25 | "The Last Thirty Minutes" | Ted Post | Story by : Lee Horton; Teleplay by : Bernie Giler | March 18, 1954 |
| 114 | 26 | "The Taming of the Shrewd" | Ted Post | Story by : Henry Charles Witwer and Samuel Marx; Teleplay by : Mary C. McCall Jr. | March 25, 1954 |
| 115 | 27 | "Turn Back the Clock" | Ted Post | Story by : Robert L. Hecker and Frances Kavanaugh; Teleplay by : Martin Berkeley | April 1, 1954 |
| 116 | 28 | "Yours for a Dream" | James Neilson | Story by : Miriam Rugel; Teleplay by : Dorothy Cooper | April 8, 1954 |
| 117 | 29 | "Sister Veronica" | Ted Post | Story by : Vivian Cosby; Teleplay by : Erna Lazarus | April 15, 1954 |
| 118 | 30 | "Wedding March" | James Neilson | Story by : Merle Miller; Teleplay by : Sig Herzig and Frederick Stephani | April 22, 1954 |
| 119 | 31 | "Night Visitor" | Phil Karlson | Story by : Norman Jacob; Teleplay by : Berne Giler | April 29, 1954 |
| 120 | 32 | "A Season to Love" | Ted Post | Story by : Fannie Baum and Dorothy DeKoven; Teleplay by : Karen DeWolf | May 6, 1954 |
| 121 | 33 | "Wonderful Day for a Wedding" | Harry Keller | Story by : Virginia Lee; Teleplay by : Lou Breslow | May 13, 1954 |
| 122 | 34 | "Beneath These Waters" | Fred F. Sears | Story by : Teleplay by : Steve Fisher | May 20, 1954 |
| 123 | 35 | "Keep It in the Family" | William D. Russell | Story by : Roswell Rogers and Paul West; Teleplay by : Roswell Rogers and Paul West | May 27, 1954 |
| 124 | 36 | "The Unlocked Door" | Jason Lindsey | Story by : Mary Roberts Rinehart; Teleplay by : Mel Dinelli | June 3, 1954 |
| 125 | 37 | "The Mason-Dixon Line" | Gerald Mayer | Story by : Michael Kraike and Albert Treynor; Teleplay by : Berne Giler and Edward Hope | June 10, 1954 |
| 126 | 38 | "The Tryst" | Ted Post | Story by : Mary Hastings Bradley and Ivan Turgenev; Teleplay by : Mary C. McCall Jr. | June 17, 1954 |
| 127 | 39 | "Indirect Approach" | Frederick Stephani | Story by : Dana Burnet; Teleplay by : Lou Breslow | June 24, 1954 |

==== Season 6 (1954–55) ====
| No. overall | No. in season | Title | Directed by | Written by | Original release date |
|---|---|---|---|---|---|
| 128 | 1 | "The Trouble With Youth" | Fred F. Sears | Story by : William Bowers; Teleplay by : William Bowers | September 30, 1954 |
| 129 | 2 | "Daughter of Mine" | Arnold Laven | Story by : Katherine Albert and Dale Eunson; Teleplay by : Lillie Hayward | October 7, 1954 |
| 130 | 3 | "Shadow of Truth" | Gregg G. Tallas | Story by : Alice Lent Covert; Teleplay by : Robert Hardy Andrews | October 14, 1954 |
| 131 | 4 | "Segment" | Fred F. Sears | Story by : David Swift; Teleplay by : Michael Kraike | October 21, 1954 |
| 132 | 5 | "A Trip Around the Block" | László Kardos | Story by : Victor Wolfson; Teleplay by : Richard Morris | October 28, 1954 |
| 133 | 6 | "Remember to Live" | James Neilson | Story by : Mary W. Lacey; Teleplay by : Mary W. Lacey | November 4, 1954 |
| 134 | 7 | "The Road Ahead" | James Neilson | Story by : Kurt Vonnegut Jr. Teleplay by : Robert Bassing | November 11, 1954 |
| 135 | 8 | "The Summer Memory" | Jules Bricken | Story by : Rod Serling; Teleplay by : Rod Serling | November 18, 1954 |
| 136 | 9 | "The Legal Beagles" | James Neilson | Story by : Teleplay by : Robert H. Bailey and Hugh King | November 25, 1954 |
| 137 | 10 | "Girl in Flight" | Fred F. Sears | Story by : Ellis St. Joseph; Teleplay by : Andrew Solt | December 2, 1954 |
| 138 | 11 | "Charlie C Company" | Arnold Laven | Story by : William Chamberlain; Teleplay by : Steve Fisher | December 9, 1954 |
| 139 | 12 | "Portrait of Lydia" | James Neilson | Story by : A.A. Milne; Teleplay by : Berish Rubin and Robert Smith | December 16, 1954 |
| 140 | 13 | "Slide, Darling, Slide" | Edward Bernds | Story by : Ernest Lehman; Teleplay by : Katherine Albert and Dale Eunson | December 23, 1954 |
| 141 | 14 | "The Unbroken Promise" | Lewis Seller | Story by : Lenore J. Coffee; Teleplay by : Karen DeWolf | December 30, 1954 |
| 142 | 15 | "Magic Formula" | Fred F. Sears | Story by : Marianne Mosner and Alyce Wade; Teleplay by : Marianne Mosner | January 6, 1955 |
| 143 | 16 | "..... and Son" | Arnold Laven | Story by : I.A.R. Wylie; Teleplay by : Robert Bassing and Peter Packer | January 13, 1955 |
| 144 | 17 | "The Stars Don't Shine" | Greg Garrison | Story by : Al C. Ward; Teleplay by : Gabrielle Upton | January 20, 1955 |
| 145 | 18 | "Letters Marked Personal" | Fred F. Sears | Story by : Peter Helmers; Teleplay by : Karen DeWolf | January 27, 1955 |
| 146 | 19 | "Touch of Spring" | James Neilson | Story by : Robert Bassing and Elizabeth Bibesco; Teleplay by : Margaret Fitts | February 3, 1955 |
| 147 | 20 | "Pretend You're You" | Fred F. Sears | Story by : Matt Taylor; Teleplay by : Margaret Fitts | February 10, 1955 |
| 148 | 21 | "Tomorrow We'll Love" | Arnold Laven | Story by : Gerry Day; Teleplay by : Karen DeWolf | February 17, 1955 |
| 149 | 22 | "Too Old for Dolls" | Fred F. Sears | Story by : Ann Pinchot and Ben Pinchot; Teleplay by : Richard Morris | February 24, 1955 |
| 150 | 23 | "The Lilac Bush" | Arnold Laven | Story by : August William Derleth and Lesley Conger; Teleplay by : Karen DeWolf | March 3, 1955 |
| 151 | 24 | "Second Sight" | Fred F. Sears | Story by : Gwen Bagni; Teleplay by : Gwen Bagni | March 10, 1955 |
| 152 | 25 | "Celebrity" | Arnold Laven | Story by : Richard Flournoy; Teleplay by : Marianne Mosner | March 17, 1955 |
| 153 | 26 | "Garrity's Sons" | Jules Bricken | Story by : Rod Serling; Teleplay by : Rod Serling | March 24, 1955 |
| 154 | 27 | "Hanrahan" | László Kardos | Story by : Hobart Donavan and W. B. Yeats; Teleplay by : Stanley Adams and Edward Hope | March 31, 1955 |
| 155 | 28 | "Deception" | Peter Godfrey | Story by : Jan Leman and Ted Thomas; Teleplay by : Karen DeWolf and Lillie Hayward | April 7, 1955 |
| 156 | 29 | "The Woman at Fog Point" | Anton M. Leader | Story by : Hugh B. Cave; Teleplay by : David Lang | April 14, 1955 |
| 157 | 30 | "Sunday Mourn" | Gerald Freedman | Story by : Roger West; Teleplay by : George W. George, Jerry Sackheim, and George F. Slavin | April 21, 1955 |
| 158 | 31 | "While We're Young" | Unknown | Story by : Stanley J. Wolf; Teleplay by : Wolf & Paul Crabtree | April 28, 1955 |
| 159 | 32 | "Appointment with Destiny" | Fred F. Sears | Story by : Gene Levitt; Teleplay by : Gabrielle Upton | May 5, 1955 |
| 160 | 33 | "The Policy of Joe Aladdin" | Gerald Freedman | Story by : Liam O'Brien and Ben Roberts; Teleplay by : George Beck | May 12, 1955 |
| 161 | 34 | "Mimi" | Gerald Freedman | Story by : Jeff Bailey and Arnold Bennett; Teleplay by : Edward Dein and Mildred Dein | May 19, 1955 |
| 162 | 35 | "Cardboard Casanova" | Anton Leader | Story by : George Asness; Teleplay by : Doris Gilbert | May 26, 1955 |
| 163 | 36 | "P.J. and the Lady" | Anton Leader | Story by : Thomas Phipps; Teleplay by : Karen DeWolf and Melvin Levy | June 2, 1955 |
| 164 | 37 | "One Man Missing" | James Neilson | Story by : Mildred Masterson McNeilly; Teleplay by : Peter Packer | June 9, 1955 |
| 165 | 38 | "Favorite Son" | Lewis Seiler | Story by : Bill Scott; Teleplay by : Charles R. Marion | June 16, 1955 |
| 166 | 39 | "The Mumbys" | James Neilson | Story by : Maude Smith Delavan; Teleplay by : Sumner Arthur Long | June 23, 1955 |

==== Season 7 (1955–56) ====
| No. overall | No. in season | Title | Directed by | Written by | Original release date |
|---|---|---|---|---|---|
| 167 | 1 | "All That Glitters" | Anton Leader | Story by : Octavus Roy Cohen and Lee Rogow; Teleplay by : Karen DeWolf | October 6, 1955 |
| 168 | 2 | "Husband" | James Neilson | Story by : Cornell Woolrich; Teleplay by : Peter Packer | October 13, 1955 |
| 169 | 3 | "The Lady in the Wind" | Ted Post | Story by : Teleplay by : Gerry Day | October 20, 1955 |
| 170 | 4 | "Twelve to Eternity" | Ted Post | Story by : Al Martin; Teleplay by : Al Martin and Jack Bennett | October 27, 1955 |
| 171 | 5 | "Johnny, Where Are You?" | Daniel Dare | Story by : Phyllis Duganne; Teleplay by : Karen DeWolf | November 3, 1955 |
| 172 | 6 | "The Blue Ribbon" | Ted Post | Story by : Cornell Woolrich; Teleplay by : Richard Collins | November 10, 1955 |
| 173 | 7 | "A Smattering of Bliss" | Anton M. Leader | Story by : Virginia Faulkner; Teleplay by : Frederick Brady | November 17, 1955 |
| 174 | 8 | "Passage to Yesterday" | John Meredyth Lucas | Story by : Teleplay by : James Warner Bellah | November 24, 1955 |
| 175 | 9 | "The Fabulous Sycamores" | Edward Buzzell | Story by : Moss Hart and George S. Kaufman; Teleplay by : Sumner Arthur Long and Hendrik Vollaerts | December 1, 1955 |
| 176 | 10 | "Bet the Queen" | James Neilson | Story by : Norman A. Fox; Teleplay by : Richard H. Landau | December 8, 1955 |
| 177 | 11 | "South of Selangor" | James Neilson | Story by : Teleplay by : Gerry Day | December 15, 1955 |
| 178 | 12 | "A Kiss for Santa" | Daniel Dare | Story by : Fred Dickenson; Teleplay by : Arthur Julian | December 22, 1955 |
| 179 | 13 | "A Set of Values" | Anton Leader | Story by : Teleplay by : William E. Barrett | December 29, 1955 |
| 180 | 14 | "Journey by Moonlight" | James Neilson | Story by : Burnham Carter; Teleplay by : Frederick Brady | January 5, 1956 |
| 181 | 15 | "Dear Diane" | Unknown | Story by : Teleplay by : Frederic Brady | January 12, 1956 |
| 182 | 16 | "Never Lend Money to a Woman" | Albert S. Rogell | Story by : Steve McNeil; Teleplay by : Martin Ragaway | January 19, 1956 |
| 183 | 17 | "Try Me for Size" | James Neilson | Story by : George Agnew Chamberlain; Teleplay by : Francis M. Cockrell | January 26, 1956 |
| 184 | 18 | "Tin Can Skipper" | Fred F. Sears | Story by : Jacland Marmur; Teleplay by : Don Mankiewicz | February 2, 1956 |
| 185 | 19 | "The Silent Strangers" | John Meredyth Lucas | Story by : Leon Ware; Teleplay by : Frank Gruber | February 9, 1956 |
| 186 | 20 | "Airborne Honeymoon" | Anton M. Leader | Story by : Mona Williams; Teleplay by : Frank Gill Jr. | February 16, 1956 |
| 187 | 21 | "Your Other Love" | James Neilson | Story by : Florence Jan Soman; Teleplay by : Gerry Day | February 23, 1956 |
| 188 | 22 | "Man Without Fear" | James Neilson | Story by : Lewis Arnold; Teleplay by : Karen DeWolf | March 1, 1956 |
| 189 | 23 | "All for a Man" | Albert S. Rogell | Story by : Karen DeWolf; Teleplay by : Karen DeWolf | March 8, 1956 |
| 190 | 24 | "That Evil Woman" | John Meredyth Lucas | Story by : Gertrude Schweitzer; Teleplay by : Richard English | March 15, 1956 |
| 191 | 25 | "Double Trouble" | Albert S. Rogell | Story by : Selden M. Loring, Gene Levitt, and Lawrence Taylor; Teleplay by : Gene Levitt | March 22, 1956 |
| 192 | 26 | "The Face" | Roger Kay | Story by : William F. Leicester; Teleplay by : William F. Leicester | March 29, 1956 |
| 193 | 27 | "Autumn Fever" | Anton Leader | Story by : Mary Roberts Rinehart; Teleplay by : Frederick Brady | April 5, 1956 |
| 194 | 28 | "On the Beach" | James Neilson | Story by : Gudmundur Magnusson, Joan Bourland, and N.B. Stone Jr. Teleplay by : Joan Bourland and N.B. Stone Jr. | April 12, 1956 |
| 195 | 29 | "The Lady in His Life" | Anton M. Leader | Story by : Muriel Roy Bolton; Teleplay by : Martin Ragaway | April 19, 1956 |
| 196 | 30 | "The Alibi" | Roger Kay | Story by : Irving H. Cooper; Teleplay by : Irving H. Cooper and Gerry Day | April 26, 1956 |
| 197 | 31 | "The Payoff" | John Meredyth Lucas | Story by : Blake Edwards; Teleplay by : Blake Edwards | May 3, 1956 |
| 198 | 32 | "Behind the Mask" | Anton M. Leader | Story by : Teleplay by : Robert Hardy Andrews | May 10, 1956 |
| 199 | 33 | "The Kill" | Gerd Oswald | Story by : Jack Webb; Teleplay by : D.D. Beauchamp | May 17, 1956 |
| 200 | 34 | "Sheila" | James Neilson | Story by : Carol Warner Gluck and Manya Starr; Teleplay by : Mary C. McCall Jr. | May 24, 1956 |
| 201 | 35 | "The Clay Pigeon" | James Neilson | Story by : Jack Harvey; Teleplay by : Jack Harvey | May 31, 1956 |
| 202 | 36 | "Mr. Kagle and the Baby Sitter" | Anton M. Leader | Story by : Oliver Crawford; Teleplay by : Peggy Chantler Dick | June 7, 1956 |
| 203 | 37 | "Panic" | Arthur Hiller | Story by : Forrest Kleinman; Teleplay by : Karen DeWolf | June 14, 1956 |
| 204 | 38 | "Remembrance Day" | Anton M. Leader | Story by : Matt Taylor; Teleplay by : Jerry Davis | June 21, 1956 |
| 205 | 39 | "A Past Remembered" | James Neilson | Story by : Jack R. Guss and Lionel Olay; Teleplay by : Jack R. Guss, John McGreevey, and Lionel Olay | June 28, 1956 |

==== Season 8 (1956–57) ====
| No. overall | No. in season | Title | Directed by | Written by | Original release date |
|---|---|---|---|---|---|
| 206 | 1 | "Catch at Straws" | Ray Milland | Story by : Fred Freiberger and Richard H. Landau; Teleplay by : Fred Freiberger | October 3, 1956 |
| 207 | 2 | "Sudden Silence" | Lewis Allen | Story by : William Heuman; Teleplay by : Lawrence B. Marcus | October 10, 1956 |
| 208 | 3 | "Paris Edition" | John Meredyth Lucas | Story by : Jack Harvey and Sol Shor; Teleplay by : Jack Harvey | October 17, 1956 |
| 209 | 4 | "Measure of Faith" | James Neilson | Story by : Norman Daniels; Teleplay by : Norman Daniels and Gerry Day | October 24, 1956 |
| 210 | 5 | "Black Jim Hawk" | Arthur Hiller | Story by : Harold Shumate; Teleplay by : Russell S. Hughes | October 31, 1956 |
| 211 | 6 | "Sometimes It Happens" | James Sheldon | Story by : Edwin Balmer; Teleplay by : Gerry Day | November 7, 1956 |
| 212 | 7 | "The Women Who Dared" | James Sheldon | Story by : Michael Cosgrove, Gerry Day; Teleplay by : Michael Cosgrove, Gerry Day, and Pauline Stone | November 14, 1956 |
| 213 | 8 | "The Menace of Hasty Heights" | Norman Tokar | Story by : Robert Wells; Teleplay by : Frederick Brady | November 21, 1956 |
| 214 | 9 | "Stand by to Dive" | Lewis Seiler | Story by : Teleplay by : David Lang | November 28, 1956 |
| 215 | 10 | "Front Page Father" | John Meredyth Lucas | Story by : Teleplay by : George Bruce and William F. Leicester | December 5, 1956 |
| 216 | 11 | "The Marriage Plan" | Daniel Dare | Story by : Robert Zacks; Teleplay by : Barry Trivers and Jack Harvey | December 12, 1956 |
| 217 | 12 | "Duffy's Man" | Anton M. Leader | Story by : Louis L'Amour; Teleplay by : Frederick Brady | December 19, 1956 |
| 218 | 13 | "Model Wife" | James Sheldon | Story by : Steve McNeil; Teleplay by : Mary C. McCall Jr. | December 26, 1956 |
| 219 | 14 | "Fear Has Many Faces" | Oscar Rudolph | Story by : Joseph Ruscoll and Janet Ruscoll; Teleplay by : Russell S. Hughes | January 2, 1957 |
| 220 | 15 | "The Quiet Stranger" | George Archainbaud | Story by : David Savage; Teleplay by : Russell S. Hughes | January 9, 1957 |
| 221 | 16 | "Sweet Charlie" | James Sheldon | Story by : Teleplay by : Steve Fisher | January 16, 1957 |
| 222 | 17 | "The Penlands and the Poodle" | William Asher | Story by : Teleplay by : Karen DeWolf | January 23, 1957 |
| 223 | 18 | "Mrs. Wane Comes to Call" | Oscar Rudolph | Story by : Teleplay by : Gerry Day and Arthur E. Orloff | January 30, 1957 |
| 224 | 19 | "The Connoisseur" | Oscar Rudolph | Story by : Walter De La Mare; Teleplay by : Wells Root | February 6, 1957 |
| 225 | 20 | "The Ringside Seat" | Lewis Seiler | Story by : Jerome Ross; Teleplay by : Karen DeWolf | February 13, 1957 |
| 226 | 21 | "With No Regrets" | Oscar Rudolph | Story by : Norma Patterson; Teleplay by : Irving H. Cooper and Edmund Morris | February 20, 1957 |
| 227 | 22 | "The Man Who Beat Lupo" | Anton Leader | Story by : Teleplay by : James Warner Bellah | February 27, 1957 |
| 228 | 23 | "Broken Barrier" | László Kardos | Story by : Stephen Butler Leacock and Mary Brinker Post; Teleplay by : Karen DeWolf | March 6, 1957 |
| 229 | 24 | "Fate Travels East" | Anton M. Leader | Story by : Charlotte Edwards; Teleplay by : Robert Bassing and Jack Harvey | March 13, 1957 |
| 230 | 25 | "The Man Across the Hall" | James Neilson | Story by : Rebecca Shallit; Teleplay by : Bernard Drew and Jonathan Kohn | March 20, 1957 |
| 231 | 26 | "House of Glass" | James Neilson | Story by : Teleplay by : DeWitt Bodeen | March 27, 1957 |
| 232 | 27 | "Exclusive" | Oscar Rudolph | Story by : Eileen Pollock and Robert Mason Pollock; Teleplay by : Gerry Day | April 3, 1957 |
| 233 | 28 | "Moment of Decision" | James Neilson | Story by : Cy Chermak; Teleplay by : Herbert Abbott Spiro | April 10, 1957 |
| 234 | 29 | "Singapore" | James Neilson | Story by : Karen DeWolf; Teleplay by : Gerry Day and Karen DeWolf | April 17, 1957 |
| 235 | 30 | "Footnote on a Doll" | James Neilson | Story by : Edwin V. Westrate; Teleplay by : Russell S. Hughes | April 24, 1957 |
| 236 | 31 | "Strange Disappearance" | Arthur Hiller | Story by : Teleplay by : Jack Harvey | May 1, 1957 |
| 237 | 32 | "The Idea Man" | D. Ross Lederman | Story by : Robert McLaughlin; Teleplay by : Howard Estabrook and Stirling Silliphant | May 8, 1957 |
| 238 | 33 | "The Gentle Deceiver" | Daniel Dare | Story by : R.C. Vodra; Teleplay by : Frederick Brady | May 15, 1957 |
| 239 | 34 | "Miller's Millions" | Daniel Dare | Story by : Teleplay by : Jack Harvey | May 22, 1957 |
| 240 | 35 | "Torn" | Arthur Hiller | Story by : Herman Epstein; Teleplay by : Karen DeWolf | May 29, 1957 |
| 241 | 36 | "The Lie" | Daniel Dare | Story by : Sylvia Dee and Cornell Woolrich; Teleplay by : Frederick Brady and Gerry Day | June 5, 1957 |
| 242 | 37 | "Cross Hairs" | Jack Gage | Story by : Teleplay by : Miles Tolner | June 12, 1957 |
| 243 | 38 | "Desperation" | Jack Gage | Story by : Irene Wempe; Teleplay by : Karen DeWolf | June 19, 1957 |
| 244 | 39 | "Adventure for Hire" | Oscar Rudolph | Story by : Tony Barrett; Teleplay by : William E. Barrett | June 26, 1957 |

== See also ==
- Academy Award
- Author's Playhouse
- The Campbell Playhouse
- Cavalcade of America
- The CBS Radio Workshop
- The Cresta Blanca Hollywood Players
- Curtain Time
- General Electric Theater
- Lux Radio Theatre
- The Mercury Theatre on the Air
- The MGM Theater of the Air
- Screen Directors Playhouse
- The Screen Guild Theater
- Stars over Hollywood
- Suspense
- The United States Steel Hour
- For other TV series sponsored by Ford Motor Company, see Ford Festival, Ford Startime, The Ford Show, and Ford Star Jubilee
