= Academy Award (radio series) =

CBS radio anthology series (1946)

- Other names: Academy Award Theater
- Genre: Anthology of movie stories
- Running time: 30 minutes
- Country of origin: United States
- Language: English
- Syndicates: CBS
- Starring: Hollywood film stars
- Written by: Frank Wilson
- Directed by: Dee Englebach
- Produced by: Dee Englebach
- Original release: March 30 – December 18, 1946
- No. of episodes: 39
- Sponsored by: House of Squibb

Robert Nathan's novel was adapted to Academy Award in 1946 to promote interest in David O. Selznick's film, which did not go into production until the following year.

Academy Award (also listed as Academy Award Theater) is a CBS radio anthology series, which presented 30-minute adaptations of plays, novels, or films. It was broadcast March 30, 1946 - December 18, 1946.

Dramas in which actors recreated their original film roles included Henry Fonda in Young Mr. Lincoln, Humphrey Bogart in The Maltese Falcon, Cary Grant in Suspicion, Gregory Peck in The Keys of the Kingdom, and Ronald Colman in Lost Horizon. Only six actors recreated their own Oscar-winning roles: Fay Bainter, Bette Davis, Paul Lukas, Victor McLaglen, Paul Muni, and Ginger Rogers.

== Format ==
Rather than adaptations of Oscar-winning films, as the title implied, the series offered "Hollywood's finest, the great picture plays, the great actors and actresses, techniques and skills, chosen from the honor roll of those who have won or been nominated for the famous golden Oscar of the Academy of Motion Picture Arts and Sciences."

With that as a guideline, any drama could be presented as long as the cast included at least one Oscar-nominated performer. For example, Robert Nathan's 1940 novel Portrait of Jennie was not released as a film until 1949. David O. Selznick, having acquired the rights to Nathan's novel in 1944, was spending much time and money in his efforts to bring it to the screen. Thus, Academy Award's December 4, 1946, adaptation of Portrait of Jennie, with John Lund and Oscar-winner Joan Fontaine, had a promotional aspect, concluding with host/announcer Hugh Brundage revealing, "Portrait of Jennie is soon to be a Selznick International picture starring Jennifer Jones and Joseph Cotten."

Episodes included The Front Page with Pat O'Brien and Adolphe Menjou on June 22, 1946.

== Production ==
Frank Wilson scripted the 30-minute adaptations for producer-director Dee Englebach, and Leith Stevens provided the music. Frank Wilson was the script writer. The sound effects crew included Gene Twombly, Jay Roth, Clark Casey, and Berne Surrey.

Episodes included Ruggles of Red Gap with Charles Laughton.

== Broadcast ==
The series began March 30, 1946, with Bette Davis, Anne Revere and Fay Bainter in Jezebel. On that first show, Jean Hersholt spoke as president of the Academy of Motion Picture Arts and Sciences, welcoming the E.R. Squibb & Sons pharmaceutical company {"The House Of Squibb"} as the program's sponsor. It was an expensive show to produce, since the stars cost $4000 a week, and another $1,600 went each week to the Academy of Motion Picture Arts and Sciences for the use of their name in the show's title. This eventually became a factor in Squibb's decision to cancel the series after only 39 weeks. The New York Times reported that a lack of film scripts was another factor in the decision because so many programs with a similar format were on the air. The series had begun with a 15-year contract between Squibb and the Academy.

The program initially aired on Saturdays at 7 pm (ET) through June, then moved to Wednesdays at 10 pm., effective with the July 3, 1946, episode.

The series ended December 18, 1946, with Margaret O'Brien and one of the series' frequent supporting players, Jeff Chandler (appearing under his real name, Ira Grossel) in Lost Angel.

== Critical response ==
Jack Gould wrote in The New York Times that the premiere episode "was in general a workmanlike job". The review noted the difficulty of trying to compress Jezebel into a 30-minute broadcast and said that the series ("a routine radio package with known box-office contents") "probably will make the grade".

== See also ==
- Author's Playhouse
- The Campbell Playhouse
- Cavalcade of America
- The CBS Radio Workshop
- The Cresta Blanca Hollywood Players
- Ford Theatre
- General Electric Theater
- Hollywood Playhouse
- Hollywood Star Playhouse
- Hollywood Star Time
- Lux Radio Theater
- The Mercury Theatre on the Air
- The MGM Theater of the Air
- Screen Director's Playhouse
- The Screen Guild Theater
- Stars over Hollywood
- Suspense
- The United States Steel Hour
