= Felix Mills =

American composer, arranger, and conductor

Gordon "Felix" Mills (born July 28, 1901) was a composer, arranger and conductor during the Golden Age of Radio in the 1930s and 1940s. Born in Fort Collins, Colorado, he was the musical director for The Mickey Mouse Theater of the Air, a Disney radio show of the 1930s. Mills created a "gadget band" with wild instruments for Donald Duck to direct on some episodes. He also created arrangements for the show.

Mills conducted his own band, and appeared in the Hollywood Bowl. Mills was also the musical director for CBS Radio's Silver Theater from 1937 to 1947. Mills chose to retire rather than fire some band members during the Red Inquisition; he built a home in Morro Bay, California, to pursue his favorite hobbies, sailing and slide photography. Mills died on April 5, 1987, in Morro Bay, California.
