= The Dreft Star Playhouse =

Daytime radio program

- Other names: The Hollywood Theatre of the Air
- Genre: Romantic movies in serial form
- Running time: 15 minutes
- Country of origin: United States
- Language(s): English
- Syndicates: NBC
- Announcer: Marvin Miller; Terry O'Sullivan
- Directed by: Les Mitchel; Axel Gruenberg
- Original release: June 28, 1943 – March 30, 1945
- Sponsored by: Dreft detergent

The Dreft Star Playhouse was a daytime radio program in the United States, presenting adaptations of romantic movies in serial form. It was broadcast on NBC June 28, 1943 – March 30, 1945. The show's original title was Hollywood Theatre of the Air, but that changed effective October 18, 1943, "[t]o avoid conflict with similar titles."

== Format ==
The Dreft Star Playhouse was classified as "prestige drama" by one source. It "attempted to accomplish in a five-times-a-week soap-opera format what Lux Radio Theatre had done in the nighttime format." Radio historian John Dunning called the program "a noble experiment, devised to see if daytime radio would support a show of purported nighttime quality."

Programs presenting adaptations of movies proliferated on nighttime radio. Lux Radio Theatre may have been the best known; others included Warner Brothers' Academy Theatre, The Screen Guild Theater, Hollywood Premiere, Hollywood Star Time, Hollywood Mystery Time, Hollywood Star Preview, Academy Award and Hollywood Star Playhouse.

In contrast to the evening programs, which limited an adaptation of a movie to a single broadcast, The Dreft Star Playhouse presented its adaptations in the form of serials whose duration varied. Perhaps the longest was "Dark Victory," starring Cathy Lewis, which ran for six weeks in daily quarter-hour doses.

== Productions and players ==
Dunning called The Dreft Star Playhouse "an ambitious undertaking," noting that the program spent "up to $3,000 per week for 'name' talent." Jane Wyman starred in its first production, "Bachelor Mother." Other titles and stars that listeners heard on the program included the following:

- "The Magnificent Ambersons" – Agnes Moorehead
- "Hold Back the Dawn" – Maureen O'Sullivan
- "Take a Letter, Darling" – Mary Astor
- "Marked Woman" – Gail Patrick
- "Suspicion" – Margo.
