= The MGM Theater of the Air =

American radio anthology drama series

- Genre: Dramatic anthology; film adaptations
- Running time: 1 hour
- Country of origin: United States
- Language: English
- Home station: WMGM
- Syndicates: Mutual
- Hosted by: Howard Dietz
- Starring: Hollywood movie stars
- Announcer: Ed Stokes
- Directed by: Max Loeb
- Produced by: Raymond Katz
- Original release: October 14, 1949 – December 27, 1952

The MGM Theater of the Air is a one-hour radio dramatic anthology in the United States. It was broadcast on WMGM in New York City and syndicated to other stations via electrical transcription October 14, 1949 – December 7, 1951. It was carried on Mutual January 5-December 27, 1952.

== Format ==
A 1950 trade publication described the program as a "Big time production ... featuring adaptions of MGM and other screen properties with top-ranking names of screen and theater."

== Development and syndication ==
Development of The MGM Theater of the Air was a departure from the parent company's previous practices. An article in a 1949 issue of Billboard noted that MGM "thruout [sic] the years has extended scant co-operation on the program level" to WMGM (which had been WHN). "Theater of the Air" and five other programs were set to be produced by MGM for broadcast on WMGM and KMGM (an FM station in Hollywood) and syndicated to other stations. The programs totaled about six hours of air time per week.

Beginning September 1, 1949, eight programs (including The Story of Dr. Kildare, The Adventures of Maisie, Crime Does Not Pay and The Hardy Family) were available to "big stations and little stations," as promoted in an ad for Metro-Goldwyn-Mayer Radio Attractions. The programs attracted interest from stations even before the official date when they would be available. Between 150 and 200 stations sought information about the shows "within a few days of the initial public announcement." An initial estimate was "The eight programs will cost MGM close to $1,500,000 per year for production and talent charges."

A reviewer of an early episode of The MGM Theater of the Air commented, "In slickness of production this hour-long program compares very favorably with many of its network brothers."

== Move to Mutual Broadcasting System ==
The MGM Theater of the Air and other MGM-produced programs moved from syndication to network distribution the week of December 31, 1951. Mutual began carrying the MGM productions Woman of the Year (based on the movie of the same name), Crime Does Not Pay, The Black Museum, The Story of Dr. Kildare, MGM Musical Comedy Theater of the Air, The Modern Adventures of Casanova, The Gracie Fields Show, The Adventures of Maisie, The Hardy Family and The MGM Theater of the Air.

Broadcasting magazine reported on Mutual's "extensive promotion campaign" for the MGM package: "The campaign was launched via distribution -- to advertisers, agencies and radio editors -- of boxes of gingerbread men in the shape of Mutual's 'Mr. Plus' trademarks and MGM's 'Leo the Lion,' along with details of the Mutual-MGM program tie-up." Despite the network's promotional efforts, however, the program lasted only one year on Mutual.

== Personnel ==
By its nature, The MGM Theater of the Air had no regular cast. Different MGM movie stars of the era were featured each week. They included Marlene Dietrich, Ronald Reagan, Joan Bennett, George Murphy and Nina Foch.

Howard Dietz, vice-president of MGM, was the program's host, with Carey Wilson as substitute host. Ed Stokes was the announcer, with Bob Williams as his substitute. Marx Loeb was the director. Raymond Katz was the producer. Joel Herron was the music conductor.

== See also ==
- Academy Award Theater
- Author's Playhouse
- Brownstone Theater
- The Campbell Playhouse
- Cavalcade of America
- CBS Radio Workshop
- Ford Theatre
- General Electric Theater
- Lux Radio Theatre
- The Mercury Theatre on the Air
- The Screen Guild Theater
- Screen Director's Playhouse
- Stars over Hollywood (radio program)
