= Lux Radio Theatre =

American radio anthology series

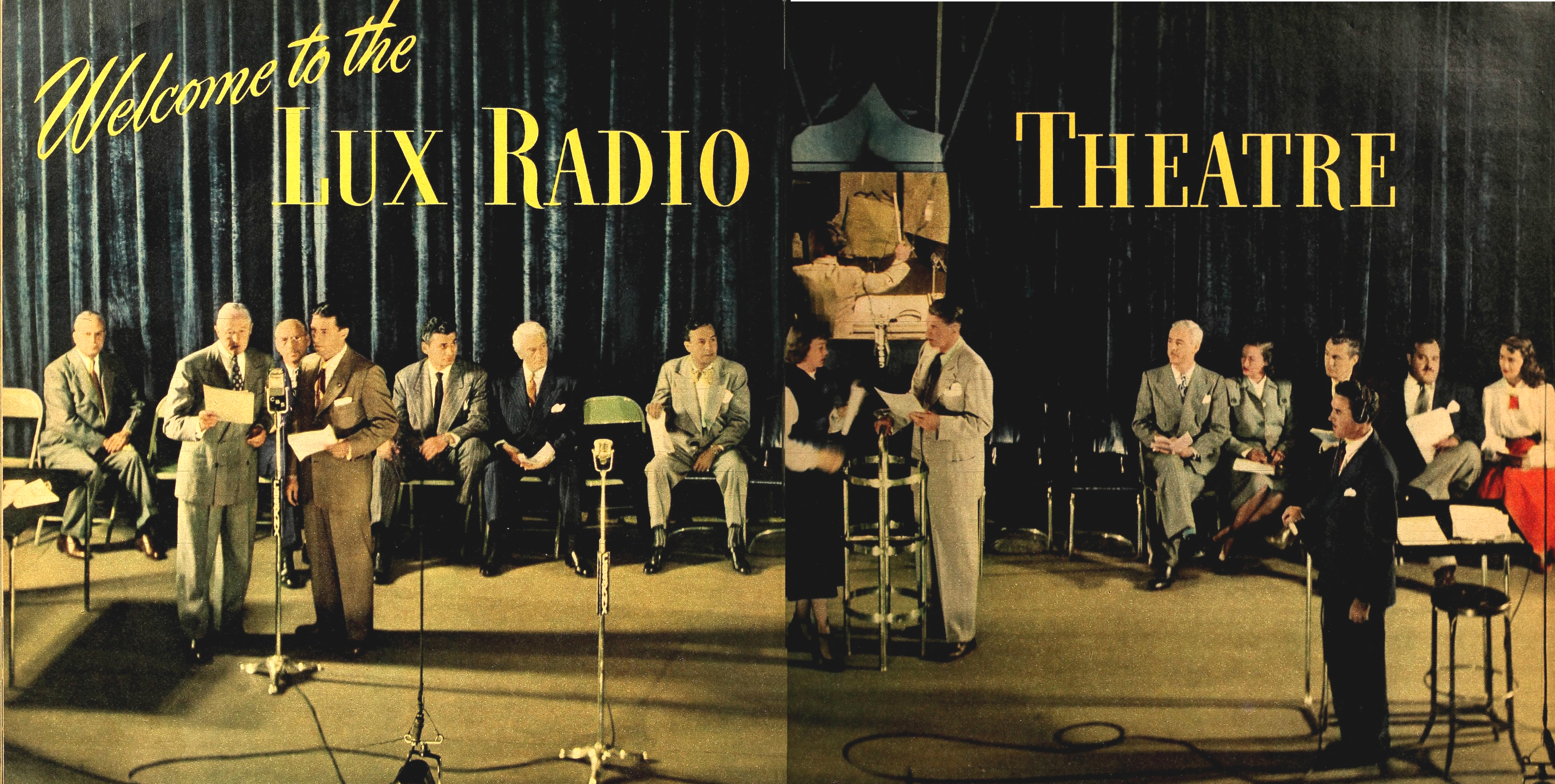
- Performing before a studio audience in 1948
- Genre: Anthology drama
- Running time: One hour
- Country of origin: United States
- Language: English
- Home station: WJZ (10/14/34-06/30/35); CBS WABC (07/29/35-05/25/36); CBS (06/01/36-06/28/54); NBC (09/14/54-06/07/55)
- TV adaptations: Lux Video Theatre (1950–57)
- Hosted by: John Anthony, Albert Hayes, Cecil B. DeMille, William Keighley, Irving Cummings
- Written by: George Wells; Sanford Barnett
- Directed by: Antony Stanford; Frank Woodruff; Sanford Barnett; Fred MacKaye; Earl Ebi; Norman Macdonnell
- Recording studio: 1934–1936 New York City; 1936–1955 Hollywood
- Original release: October 14, 1934 – June 7, 1955
- No. of series: 21
- No. of episodes: 927
- Audio format: Monaural sound
- Podcast: Lux Radio Theater

Lux Radio Theatre, sometimes spelled Lux Radio Theater, a classic radio anthology series, was broadcast on the NBC Blue Network (1934–35) (owned by the National Broadcasting Company, later predecessor of American Broadcasting Company [ABC] in 1943–1945); CBS Radio network (Columbia Broadcasting System) (1935–54), and NBC Radio (1954–55). Initially, the series adapted Broadway plays during its first two seasons before it began adapting films. These hour-long radio programs were performed live before studio audiences. The series became the most popular dramatic anthology series on radio, broadcast for more than 20 years and continued on television as the Lux Video Theatre through most of the 1950s. The primary sponsor of the show was Unilever through its Lux Soap brand.

Broadcasting from New York, the series premiered at 2:30 pm, October 14, 1934, on the NBC Blue Network with a production of Seventh Heaven starring Miriam Hopkins and John Boles in a full-hour adaptation of the 1922–24 Broadway production by Austin Strong. The host was the show's fictional producer, Douglass Garrick (portrayed by John Anthony). Doris Dagmar played another fictional character, Peggy Winthrop, who delivered the Lux commercials. Each show featured a scripted session with Garrick talking to the lead actors. Anthony appeared as Garrick from the premiere 1934 episode until June 30, 1935. Garrick was portrayed by Albert Hayes from July 29, 1935, to May 25, 1936, when the show moved to the West Coast.

Famed studio executive and film producer and director Cecil B. DeMille took over as the host on June 1, 1936, continuing until January 22, 1945. That initial episode with DeMille featured stars Marlene Dietrich and Clark Gable in The Legionnaire and the Lady. On several occasions, usually when he was out of town, he was temporarily replaced by various celebrities, including Leslie Howard and Edward Arnold.

Lux Radio Theatre strove to feature as many of the original stars of the original stage and film productions as possible, usually paying them $5,000 an appearance. In 1936, when sponsor manufacturer Lever Brothers (who made Lux brand soap and detergent) moved the show from New York City to Hollywood, the program began to emphasize adaptations of films rather than plays. The first Lux film adaptation was The Legionnaire and the Lady, with Marlene Dietrich and Clark Gable, based on the film Morocco. That was followed by a Lux adaptation of The Thin Man, featuring the movie's actual stars, Myrna Loy and William Powell.

== Radio regulars ==
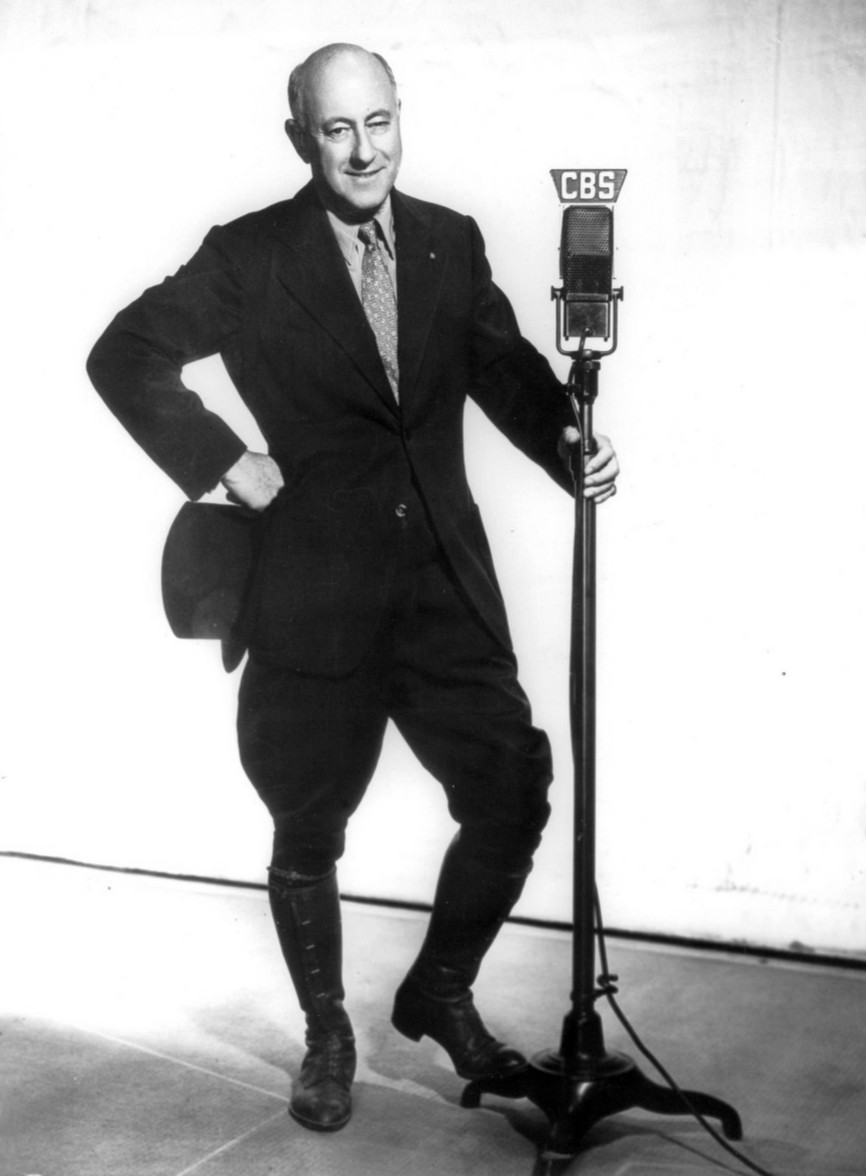
Cecil B. DeMille, host of Lux Radio Theatre (1936–1945)

Though the show focused on film and its performers, several classic radio regulars appeared in Lux Radio Theatre productions. Jim and Marian Jordan, better known as Fibber McGee and Molly, appeared on the show twice and also built an episode of their own radio comedy series around one of those appearances. Their longtime costar, Arthur Q. Bryan (wisecracking Doc Gamble on Fibber McGee and Molly), made a few Lux appearances, as well. Bandleader Phil Harris, a longtime regular on Jack Benny's radio program and his wife Alice Faye, who became radio stars with their own comedy show in 1948, appeared in a Lux presentation. Fred Allen, Jack Benny (with and without his wife, Mary Livingstone), and George Burns and Gracie Allen were also among the other radio stars who were invited to do Lux presentations.

Lux Radio Theatre once presented an adaptation of the film version of a radio series, The Life of Riley, featuring William Bendix as the Brooklyn-born, California-transplanted, stumbling but bighearted aircraft worker he already made famous in the long-running radio series (and eventual television hit) of the same name. At least once, Lux Radio Theatre offered a presentation without any known performers; its adaptation of This Is the Army during World War II featured a cast of American soldiers.

A famous urban legend claimed that actor Sonny Tufts was slated to appear as a guest alongside Joan Fontaine for a production of The Major and the Minor on Lux Radio Theatre. When Joseph Cotten read the names of the next week's cast, he supposedly said, with a mixture of shock and astonishment, that listeners would hear "that new, talented personality... Sonny Tufts?!" However, this never happened. The legend began as a fake segment on one of Kermit Schafer's popular "Bloopers" albums, which have been criticized for their recreations, fabrications, and lack of accuracy. In actuality, Tufts was introduced by Cotten on the radio series Suspense, but Cotten's introduction was perfectly normal.

== AFRA closed shop ==
A clash over closed shop union rulings favored by the American Federation of Radio Artists ended DeMille's term as host of Lux Radio Theatre. AFRA assessed members a dollar each to help back a campaign to enact closed-shop rulings in California. DeMille, an AFRA member but a stern opponent of closed shops, refused to pay because he believed it would nullify his opposition vote. When AFRA ruled those not paying faced suspension from the union, thus a ban from appearing on the air, DeMille was finished in radio (because he also refused to let anyone else pay the dollar for him).

In his 1959 autobiography, DeMille alleged that a former member of the American Communist Party later confided to him that the party had consciously orchestrated these circumstances of his exclusion from radio, as they considered him to be one of their two foremost enemies in radio.

== Hosts ==
Lux Radio Theatre employed several hosts over the following year, eventually choosing William Keighley as the new permanent host, a post he held from late 1945 through 1952. After that, producer-director Irving Cummings hosted the program until it ended in 1955. For its airings on the U.S. Armed Forces Radio Service (for which it was retitled Hollywood Radio Theater), the program was hosted by Don Wilson in the early 1950s.

A studio audience gathers prior to a live production at Hollywood's CBS Radio Playhouse, located one block south of Hollywood and Vine at 1615 North Vine Street.

During its years on CBS in Hollywood, Lux Radio Theatre was broadcast from the CBS Radio Playhouse at 1615 North Vine Street in Hollywood, one block south of the intersection of Hollywood Boulevard and Vine. The theater was owned by aviator, industrialist, and film producer Howard Hughes in the early 1930s. When it was purchased in 1954 by philanthropist Huntington Hartford, it was briefly called the Huntington Hartford Theater and then the Doolittle Theater. It is now the Ricardo Montalbán Theatre.

== Notable stars ==
Many of the leading names in stage and film appeared in the series, most in the roles they made famous on the screen. They included Abbott and Costello, Lauren Bacall, Wallace Beery, Ingrid Bergman, Humphrey Bogart, James Cagney, Ronald Colman, Joan Crawford, Adriana Caselotti, Bing Crosby, Bette Davis, Irene Dunne, Deanna Durbin, Errol Flynn, Henry Fonda, Ava Gardner, Judy Garland, Betty Grable, Cary Grant, Rita Hayworth, Katharine Hepburn, William Holden, Bob Hope, Betty Hutton, Al Jolson, Gene Kelly, Ruby Keeler, Hedy Lamarr, Carole Lombard, Myrna Loy, Jeanette MacDonald, Fredric March, Robert Mitchum, Dennis Morgan, Paul Muni, Laurence Olivier, Robert Preston, Tyrone Power, Edward G. Robinson, Ginger Rogers, Mickey Rooney, Frank Sinatra, Red Skelton, Barbara Stanwyck, James Stewart, Gloria Swanson, Elizabeth Taylor, Robert Taylor, Shirley Temple, Spencer Tracy, Lana Turner, John Wayne, and Orson Welles.

== Episodes ==
- List of Lux Radio Theatre episodes

== Overseas ==
=== Australia ===
An Australian Lux Radio Theatre was broadcast on the Major Broadcasting Network during the late 1930s, 1940s and 1950s. It was heard nationwide at 8.00 pm on a Sunday evening. Many U.S. theatrical, movie, television and radio personalities made the long flight to Australia, simply to appear on the Australian version of Lux Radio Theatre.

On Sunday evening 3 September 1939 and as part of Lux Radio Theatre, the Major network was broadcasting a performance of Leah Kleschna, which was suddenly interrupted by the voice of the Prime Minister, the Rt. Hon. Robert Menzies, announcing that Australia was now at war with Germany.

In 2018 and as recently as 2020 and 2021 (despite COVID-19 restrictions) a group of entrepreneurs has recreated the Lux Radio Theatre as a theatrical event which toured Australian cities and towns. As in the original radio programs, the cast are all dressed formally, and those purchasing audience tickets were also encouraged to wear their best clothes. Many famous plays, particularly some Agatha Christie mysteries are being performed.

=== South Africa ===
A South African version of Lux Radio Theatre ran on Springbok Radio between 1950 and 1985. While having the same name and sponsor, it departed from the American show in that, additionally, British and Australian works were adapted into the hour-long radio formats. Many of the early episodes were direct rebroadcasts of the Australian programs. Lux Radio Theatre was the most enduring show on Springbok Radio, running from the first night of the network's broadcasting life until six months before it went off the air.

== Television ==
On October 2, 1950, Lux Video Theatre began as a live 30-minute Monday evening CBS Television series, switching to Thursday nights during August 1951. In September 1953, the show relocated from New York to Hollywood.

In August 1954, the show moved to NBC Television as an hour-long show on Thursday nights, telecast until September 12, 1957. James Mason was the host in the 1954–55 season.

== See also ==
- Academy Award Theater
- Author's Playhouse
- The Campbell Playhouse
- Cavalcade of America
- CBS Radio Workshop
- The Cresta Blanca Hollywood Players
- Curtain Time
- Ford Theatre
- General Electric Theater
- Hollywood Hotel
- Lux (soap)
- The Mercury Theatre on the Air
- The MGM Theater of the Air
- The Screen Guild Theater
- Screen Director's Playhouse
- Stars over Hollywood
- Suspense
- Theater Guild on the Air
