= The Cresta Blanca Hollywood Players =

Anthology radio drama series

- Other names: Hollywood Players
- Genre: Dramatic anthology
- Running time: 30 minutes
- Country of origin: United States
- Language: English
- Syndicates: CBS
- Announcer: Frank Bingman
- Directed by: Don Clark
- Original release: September 3, 1946 – February 26, 1947
- Sponsored by: Cresta Blanca Wines

The Cresta Blanca Hollywood Players (often referred to as just Hollywood Players) is a dramatic anthology radio series. It was broadcast on CBS September 3, 1946 – February 26, 1947.

== Format ==
Material presented on the show came from "hit movies, stage successes, best-seller novels and short stories, with each star selecting something in which he or she had appeared or wanted to appear". Productions included "Golden Boy," "Elizabeth the Queen," "Fifth Avenue Girl" and "Rebecca."

Except for the selection of material by stars, Hollywood Players' format was much like that of a number of other radio programs of its time. A 1946 article in the trade publication Billboard quoted one advertising agency person who included Hollywood Players among a group of "more would-be Lux Radio Theaters than ever." Radio historian John Dunning wrote, "The series might have had a longer run but for the glut of similar Hollywood shows then on the networks."

== Personnel ==
Hollywood Players had a repertory structure. Movie stars Claudette Colbert, Bette Davis, Joan Fontaine, John Garfield, Paulette Goddard, Gene Kelly and Gregory Peck were featured, with each appearing several times over the program's weeks on the air. The group was promoted as "the greatest galaxy of star names as program regulars in radio history."

Guest stars included Lynn Bari, Barry Sullivan and Janet Leigh, who first appeared on radio at age 19 in Hollywood Players' production "All Through the House," December 24, 1946.

Frank Bingman was the show's announcer, and Don Clark was the director. Bernard Katz led the orchestra.
