= CBS Radio Workshop =

1956–1957 radio series

The CBS Radio Workshop
- Genre: Anthology drama
- Running time: 30 min (25 min. in later episodes)
- Country of origin: United States
- Language: English
- Home station: CBS
- Directed by: William N. Robson, Elliott Lewis, Tony Schwartz, Dee Engelbach, Jack Johnstone, Antony Ellis
- Produced by: William N. Robson; William Froug
- Original release: January 27, 1956 – September 22, 1957
- No. of episodes: 86
- Audio format: Monaural sound

The CBS Radio Workshop was an experimental dramatic radio anthology series that aired on CBS from January 27, 1956, until September 22, 1957. Subtitled “radio’s distinguished series to man’s imagination,” it was a revival of the earlier Columbia Experimental Laboratory (1931), Columbia Experimental Dramatic Laboratory (1932) and Columbia Workshop broadcasts by CBS from 1936 to 1943. The CBS Radio Workshop was one of American network radio's last attempts to hold on to, and perhaps recapture, some of the demographics they had lost to television in the post-World War II era.

The premiere broadcast was a two-part adaptation of Aldous Huxley's Brave New World, introduced and narrated by Huxley. It took a unique approach to sound effects, as described in a Time (February 6, 1956) review that week:

It took three radio sound men, a control-room engineer and five hours of hard work to create the sound that was heard for less than 30 seconds on the air. The sound consisted of a ticking metronome, tom-tom beats, bubbling water, air hose, cow moo, boing! (two types), oscillator, dripping water (two types) and three kinds of wine glasses clicking against each other. Judiciously blended and recorded on tape, the effect was still not quite right. Then the tape was played backward with a little echo added. That did it. The sound depicted the manufacturing of babies in the radio version of Aldous Huxley's Brave New World.Time, February 6, 1956

Music for the series was composed by Bernard Herrmann, Jerry Goldsmith, Amerigo Moreno, Ray Noble and Leith Stevens. Writers whose work was adapted for the series included John Cheever, Robert A. Heinlein, Sinclair Lewis, H. L. Mencken, Edgar Allan Poe, Christopher Isherwood, Frederik Pohl, James Thurber, Mark Twain and Thomas Wolfe.

Two episodes, "Sweet Cherries in Charleston" and "Heart of the Man," were remakes of scripts by Richard Durham for the anthology series Destination Freedom (1948–1950). William N. Robson, who had directed on Columbia Workshop, worked on CBS Radio Workshop as well, and the Archibald MacLeish radio play "Air Raid" (which premiered on Columbia Workshop) was remade.

== Listen to ==
- CBS Radio Workshop in the Internet Archive's Old-Time Radio Collection
