= Author's Playhouse =

Anthology radio drama series

- Genre: Anthology
- Running time: 30 minutes
- Country of origin: United States
- Language(s): English
- Syndicates: Mutual; CBS; NBC
- Created by: Wynn Wright
- Original release: March 5, 1941 – June 4, 1945

Author's Playhouse is an anthology radio drama series created by Wynn Wright, that aired on Mutual in 1940–1941, and on the NBC Blue Network from March 5, 1941, until October 1941. It then moved to the NBC Red Network where it was heard until June 4, 1945. Philip Morris was the sponsor between 1942 and 1943.

Premiering with "Elementals" by Stephen Vincent Benét, the series featured adaptations of stories by famous authors, such as “Mr. Mergenthwirker’s Lobbies” by Nelson Bond, "The Snow Goose" by Paul Gallico, "The Monkey's Paw" by W.W. Jacobs, "The Piano" by William Saroyan and "The Secret Life of Walter Mitty" by James Thurber.

== Cast ==
Cast members included Curley Bradley, John Hodiak, Marvin Miller, Nelson Olmsted, Fern Persons, Olan Soule and Les Tremayne. Orchestra conductors for the program were Joseph Gallicchio, Rex Maupin and Roy Shield.

== Production ==
Directors included Norman Felton, Homer Heck and Fred Weihe. In 1944, Author's Playhouse was the summer replacement for Truth or Consequences.

== Related ==
The series was a precursor to several NBC radio programs of the late 1940s and early 1950s: The World's Great Novels, NBC Presents: Short Story and The NBC University Theater.
