= I Spy (1965 TV series) =

American spy television series (1965–1968)

- Title card
- Genre: Spy; Adventure; Action; Comedy drama
- Developed by: David Friedkin; Morton Fine
- Starring: Robert Culp; Bill Cosby
- Theme music composer: Earle Hagen
- Composer: Earle Hagen; Hugo Friedhofer; Carl Brandt; Van Cleave
- Country of origin: United States
- Original language: English
- No. of seasons: 3
- No. of episodes: 82

Production
- Executive producer: Sheldon Leonard
- Producer: David Friedkin; Morton Fine
- Cinematography: Fouad Said; Fleet Southcott
- Camera setup: Single-camera
- Running time: 50–51 minutes
- Production company: Three F Productions

Original release
- Network: NBC
- Release: 15 September 1965 – 15 April 1968

I Spy is an American spy television series developed by David Friedkin and Morton Fine, that ran for three seasons on NBC from September 15, 1965, to April 15, 1968, and teamed American intelligence agents Kelly Robinson (Robert Culp) and Alexander "Scotty" Scott (Bill Cosby), traveling undercover as international "tennis bums." Robinson poses as an amateur with Scott as his trainer, playing against wealthy opponents in return for food and lodging. Their work involved chasing villains, spies, and beautiful women.

The series was noted for its relatively-grounded, realistic approach to espionage and the influx of Cold War politics, compared to the more fantastical approaches of spy fiction of the day. The series did not feature a fixed locale, instead utilizing location shooting across the United States and the world.

The creative forces behind the show were writers Friedkin and Fine and cinematographer Fouad Said. Together they formed Triple F Productions under the aegis of Desilu Productions where the show was produced. Fine and Friedkin (who previously wrote scripts for radio's Broadway Is My Beat and Crime Classics under producer-director Elliott Lewis) were co-producers and head writers, and wrote the scripts for 16 episodes, one of which Friedkin directed. Friedkin also dabbled in acting and appeared in two episodes in the first season. Actor–producer Sheldon Leonard, known for playing gangster roles in the 1940s and 1950s, was the executive producer (receiving top billing before the title in the series' opening title sequence).

Bill Cosby won three acting Emmy Awards over the course of the series, while composer Earle Hagen won Outstanding Achievement in Musical Composition. The series accumulated an additional 15 Emmy nominations during its run, including three nods for Outstanding Drama Series. It also won the Golden Globe Award for Best Television Program in 1967.

== Premise ==
The series follows the adventures of Kelly Robinson (Robert Culp) and Alexander "Scotty" Scott (Bill Cosby), a pair of undercover American intelligence agents whose activities take them across the globe.

The name of the espionage unit they worked for was never specified, only ever referred to as "the Department" and implied to be military in nature. In one flashback episode, it is established that all agents took their original training at The Presidio. At least two episodes begin with them receiving a briefing at the Pentagon, they frequently refer to the Pentagon as the ultimate headquarters of their organization, and they are often seen receiving their instructions from uniformed, high ranking, military officers - with all branches of the military - Army, Navy, Marines and Air Force - showing up in such a role. In one episode, they are being briefed at the beginning by British military officers. However, they also seem to be answerable to the State Department as well, frequently getting instructions from civilian administrators at or from the local American Embassy in the nation they are operating in. In at least one episode they directly refer to the American ambassador as someone who can assist them.

The espionage plots were, with a few exceptions, realistically set in the Cold War and the real life geopolitics of the mid-1960’s. They often specifically referred to their opponents as “the Russians”, or “the Chinese”, or other Communist Bloc countries of the time. Only rarely was a fictitious city or country used as a plot device. The espionage plots were almost always plausible – with a couple of comedic exceptions – and actual Cold War events were frequently alluded to or used as the basis for a plot. Other contemporary geopolitical factors that appeared in certain episodes were Arab nationalism and the idea of a potential Jihad, domestic terrorism within the United States itself, Neofascist organizations, and escaped war criminals from World War II.

The two agents sometimes engage in standard espionage activities like interrogation of defectors and assisting friendly agents returning from enemy territory. However, the two main characters themselves are only twice shown operating behind the Iron or Bamboo Curtain and once in Viet Cong controlled territory. They spend all other episodes operating in the US itself or, more often, a country allied to the U.S. NATO allies Greece, Italy and British Hong Kong; U.S. ally Japan; OAS member Mexico; and U.S. unofficial (at the time) ally Spain are all locations where a storyline is set. Likewise Morocco, which was a technically neutral, but pro-West country at the time, is the setting for a few episodes. They cooperate with British, Japanese and Greek intelligence officers in various episodes and with local police officials in others, but largely their activities are unknown to the local authorities. The two agents are often seen uncovering and eliminating Soviet Bloc or Chinese espionage activities in Western nations, or uncovering a traitor in their own organization. Such activities would technically make them Counter-Intelligence agents. Occasionally they are involved in fighting against narcotic smuggling or thwarting a coup attempt against a friendly ruler. In a few episodes they are not actually on an assignment at all but have an adventure related to their personal lives, such as helping keep Scotty’s foster-daughter's boyfriend out of trouble with the Italian police, or dealing with the angry family of a soldier who had served under Kelly in the Korean War years before and had been killed in action. While the two agents are frequently involved with attractive women who factor into their assignment, they rarely become involved with an innocent bystander who is accidentally swept up into the situation as was the usual plotline of The Man from U.N.C.L.E..

== Cast and characters ==
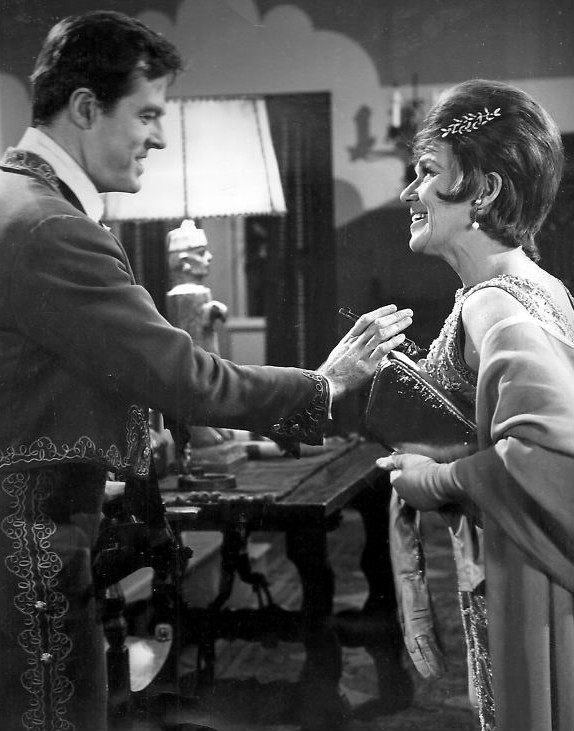
Culp as Kelly Robinson with Jeanette Nolan, 1966

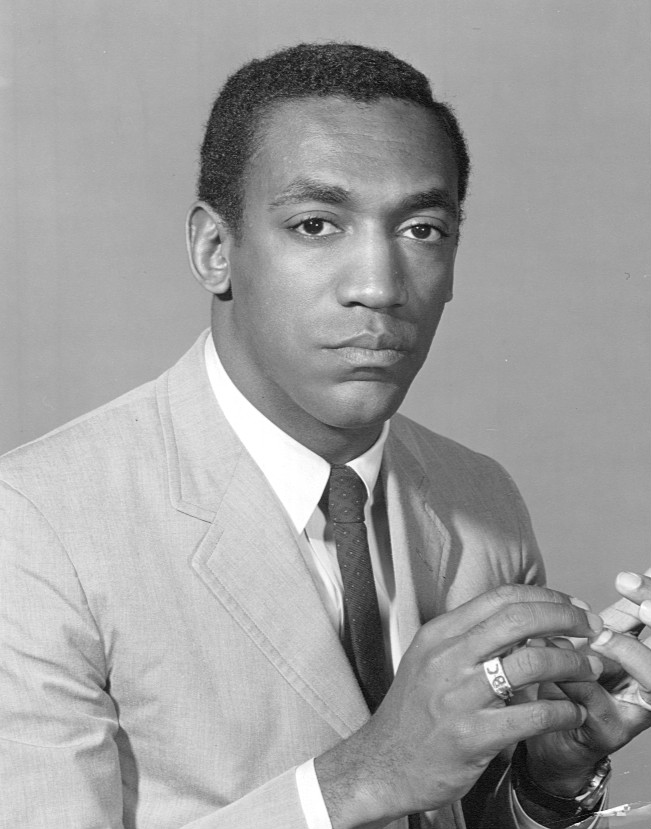
Cosby as Alexander Scott

The two main characters are Kelly Robinson (Robert Culp) and Alexander Scott (Bill Cosby), the only characters to appear in all 82 episodes of the series. They have been operating together as a two man team for a couple of years when the series begins. It is indicated that Robinson is a few years older and has been in the Department longer than Scott (however a third season flashback episode shows them going through initial training together, so that aspect of the backstory changed a little).

Robinson is an internationally ranked and modestly well known tennis player, but not a professional player. This was in the pre-Open era of international tennis and the major championships were for amateur players only, so Robinson ostensibly travels the world as a "tennis bum", playing tournaments and hobnobbing with celebrities and politicians. It is his cover for his espionage activities. He is a graduate of Princeton University and a veteran of the Korean war where he was an infantry platoon leader as a lieutenant. He was a track and field athlete as well as a tennis player in his school years. Kelly's age and childhood background are inconsistently dealt with during the series. If a Korean War veteran, he'd be about 35-37 during the run of the series. In one episode he is said to be originally from Ohio, but in others he calls "the West Coast" his original home. In one episode he states that his father was a military lawyer and was involved in prosecuting German war criminals after World War II. In another episode it is indicated that he was orphaned before he was an adult and spent time with an aunt and uncle living on a farm in an unspecified location, possibly the Central Valley of California. He runs into a former love interest from time to time, and states that he ended the most serious romantic relationship of his life in order to enter into his intelligence career. He can be emotional and hot-headed at times, but can also be cold and ruthless when needed.

Scott is an intellectual, a graduate of Temple University, where he starred on the football team, and is a Rhodes Scholar. He is a linguist who seems to have studied multiple foreign languages in his educational years. He is approximately 29 years old during the series and was recruited into the intelligence community by a college professor. He grew up in urban Philadelphia where his mother and sister still live and he writes to or calls his mother frequently. He is usually the more level headed of the two agents and less emotional, but when he does become emotional he can be very despondent or display a violent temper. He is proud of his accomplishments and acknowledges the fact that the US has issues it could improve upon, but is a very loyal and patriotic American.

Both agents often question the morality of their profession and ponder the impact the life they lead has on their psyche and their soul. The two men are very close, often referring to one another as being like a brother. Yet they both seem to wonder what kind of life and family they would have had if they had not gone into the espionage world.

I Spy broke ground in that it was the first American television drama to feature a Black actor (Cosby) in a lead role. Originally an older actor was slated to play a fatherly mentor to Culp's character. After seeing Cosby performing stand-up comedy on a talk-show, Sheldon Leonard decided to take a chance on hiring him to play opposite Culp. The concept was changed from a mentor-protégé relationship to same-age partners who were equals. It was also notable that Cosby's race was never an issue in any of the stories, though on occasion oblique references surfaced (such as in the second-season episode "One of Our Bombs Is Missing," in which Scott jokingly said that he would "join the Klan," if it would help them recover a lost atomic bomb). Nor was his character in any way subservient to Culp's, with the exception that Culp's "Kelly Robinson" was a more experienced agent. (Culp revealed in his audio commentary on the DVD release that he and Cosby agreed early on that "Our statement is a non-statement" regarding race, and the subject was never discussed again.) As a strait-laced Rhodes Scholar fluent in many languages, Cosby's "Scotty" was really the brains of the team. His partner was the athlete and playboy who lived by his wits. The success of the show is primarily attributed to the chemistry between Culp and Cosby. Fans tuned in more for their hip banter than for the espionage stories, making I Spy a leader in the buddy genre. The two actors quickly developed a close friendship that mirrored their on-screen characters, a friendship that would last until Culp's death in 2010. The show also coined unique phrases that, briefly, became catchphrases, such as "wonderfulness". Wonderfulness was used as the title of one of Cosby's albums of stand-up comedy released concurrently with the series. Cosby also occasionally slipped in bits of his comic routines during his improvised badinage with Culp. (In one episode Scott, being interrogated under the influence of drugs, says his name is Fat Albert.) Many details of Cosby's life were also written into his character. Scott does not drink or smoke—while Kelly Robinson does both. There are frequent references to Scott's childhood in Philadelphia and attending Temple University (Cosby is sometimes seen wearing his own Temple sweatshirt), and in the "Cops and Robbers" episode, Scotty returns home to Philadelphia to revisit his old neighborhood.

=== Guest stars ===
Notable guest actors who appeared on the series included Kenneth Tobey, France Nuyen, Mako, Nehemiah Persoff, Jack Kruschen, Cicely Tyson, Jeanette Nolan, Gabriele Ferzetti, Michael Constantine, George Takei, Eartha Kitt, Vera Miles, Martin Landau, Julie London, Ivan Dixon, Carroll O'Connor, Ron Howard, Barbara Steele, Victor Buono, Lew Ayres, Anna Karina, Dolores Del Río, Godfrey Cambridge, Raffaella Carrà, Nancy Wilson, Leslie Uggams, Boris Karloff, Ricardo Montalbán, Jean Marsh, Don Rickles, Jim Brown, Nina Foch, Maurice Evans, Walter Koenig, Victor Jory, Michael Rennie, Cyril Delevanti, Dorothy Lamour, Henry Wilcoxon, Vincent Gardenia, Peter Wyngarde, Gene Hackman, Richard Kiel, Nobuko Miyamoto, Wolf Ruvinskis, Michael J. Pollard, Leopoldo Trieste, Noel Purcell, Sal Ponti, Gene LeBell, and G. D. Spradlin.

== Settings ==
I Spy was a trailblazer in its use of exotic international locations in an attempt to emulate the James Bond film series. This was unique for a television show, especially since the series actually filmed its lead actors at locations ranging from Spain to Japan, rather than relying on stock footage. Compare with the more recent series, Alias, which also utilized worldwide settings but rarely filmed outside the Los Angeles region. Contrast the extensive use of location shooting with I Spy's contemporaries on CBS's Mission: Impossible and on NBC's The Man from U.N.C.L.E., which were mostly filmed on the Desilu and MGM back lots, respectively. Location filming is expensive and requires significantly more planning than studio filming, but the resulting quality was key to I Spy's success. Each season the producers would select four or five scenic locations around the world and create stories that took advantage of the local attractions. Episodes were filmed in Hong Kong, Athens, Rome, Florence, Madrid, Seville, Venice, Tokyo, Mexico City, Acapulco, San Francisco, Las Vegas, and Morocco.

== Style and tone ==
I Spy was a fixture in the popular secret agent genre of the 1960s—a trend that began with the James Bond films. By 1965, virtually every studio was producing secret agent TV shows, films, and spin-off merchandise. What set I Spy apart from contemporary programs such as The Man from U.N.C.L.E., The Avengers, and The Wild Wild West was its emphasis on realism. There were no fanciful 007-style gadgets, outlandish villains or campy, tongue-in-cheek humor. Although Culp and Cosby frequently exchanged breezy, lighthearted dialog, the stories invariably focused on the gritty, ugly side of the espionage business.

Occasionally the series produced purely comedic episodes such as "Chrysanthemum," inspired by The Pink Panther, and "Mainly on the Plains" with Boris Karloff as an eccentric scientist who thinks he's Don Quixote. However, most episodes dealt with more serious subjects (e.g., heroin addiction in "The Loser") and did not shy away from ending on a somber note. It was also one of the very few American dramatic television series of the 1960s (The Twilight Zone was another) to set an episode in the then-taboo region of Vietnam. The 1966 episode was "The Tiger," written by Robert Culp, and during filming a romance ensued between Culp and Vietnamese–French guest star France Nuyen. The two were married the following year, and Nuyen went on to appear in several more episodes.

== Episodes ==
=== Season 1: 1965–66 ===
No. overall	No. in season	Title	Directed by	Written by	Original release date	Prod. code
1	1	"So Long, Patrick Henry"	Leo Penn	Robert Culp	September 15, 1965	101
2	2	"A Cup of Kindness"	Leo Penn	Morton Fine & David Friedkin	September 22, 1965	102
3	3	"Carry Me Back to Old Tsing-Tao"	Mark Rydell	David Karp	September 29, 1965	103
4	4	"Chrysanthemum"	David Friedkin	Edward J. Lakso	October 6, 1965	104
5	5	"Dragon's Teeth"	Leo Penn	Gilbert Ralston	October 13, 1965	105
6	6	"The Loser"	Mark Rydell	Robert Culp	October 20, 1965	106
7	7	"Danny Was a Million Laughs"	Mark Rydell	Arthur Dales	October 27, 1965	107
8	8	"The Time of the Knife"	Paul Wendkos	Gilbert Ralston	November 3, 1965	108
9	9	"No Exchange on Damaged Merchandise"	Leo Penn	Garry Marshall & Jerry Belson	November 10, 1965	109
10	10	"Tatia"	David Friedkin	Robert Lewin	November 17, 1965	110
11	11	"Weight of the World"	Paul Wendkos	Robert Lewin	December 1, 1965	111
12	12	"Three Hours on a Sunday Night"	Paul Wendkos	Morton Fine & David Friedkin	December 8, 1965	112
13	13	"Tigers of Heaven"	Allen Reisner	Morton Fine & David Friedkin	December 15, 1965	113
14	14	"Affair in T'Sien Cha"	Sheldon Leonard	Morton Fine & David Friedkin	December 29, 1965	114
15	15	"The Tiger"	Paul Wendkos	Robert Culp	January 5, 1966	115
16	16	"The Barter"	Allen Reisner	Harvey Bullock & P.S. Allen	January 12, 1966	116
17	17	"Always Say Goodbye"	Allen Reisner	Robert C. Dennis & Earl Barret	January 26, 1966	117
18	18	"Court of the Lion"	Robert Culp	Robert Culp	February 2, 1966	118
19	19	"Turkish Delight"	William Thomas	Eric Bercovici	February 9, 1966	119
20	20	"Bet Me a Dollar"	Richard Sarafian	David Friedkin & Morton Fine	February 16, 1966	120
21	21	"Return to Glory"	Robert Sarafian	David Friedkin & Morton Fine	February 23, 1966	121
22	22	"The Conquest of Maude Murdock"	Paul Wendkos	Robert C. Dennis & Earl Barret	March 2, 1966	122
23	23	"A Day Called 4 Jaguar"	Richard Sarafian	Michael Zagor	March 9, 1966	123
25	24	"Crusade to Limbo"	Richard Sarafian	Story by : Jack Turley; Teleplay by : Morton Fine & David Freidkin & Jack Turley	March 23, 1966	124
26	25	"My Mother, The Spy"	Richard Benedict	Harold Gast	March 30, 1966	125
27	26	"There was a Little Girl"	John Rich	Story by : Robert Bloch; Teleplay by : Stephen Kandel	April 6, 1966	126
28	27	"It's All Done with Mirrors"	Robert Butler	Stephen Kandel	April 13, 1966	127
24	28	"One Thousand Fine"	Paul Wendkos	Eric Bercovici	April 27, 1966	128

=== Season 2: 1966–67 ===
No. overall	No. in season	Title	Directed by	Written by	Original release date	Prod. code
29	1	"So Coldly Sweet"	Paul Wendkos	Stephen Kandel	September 14, 1966	201
30	2	"Lori"	Paul Wendkos	Morton Fine & David Friedkin	September 21, 1966	202
31	3	"Sophia"	Robert Fine	Morton Fine & David Friedkin	September 28, 1966	203
32	4	"Vendetta"	Alf Kjellin	Marion Hargrove	October 5, 1966	204
33	5	"A Gift from Alexander"	Alf Kjellin	Barry Oringer	October 12, 1966	205
34	6	"Trial by Treehouse"	Richard Sarafian	Michael Zagor	October 19, 1966	206
35	7	"Sparrowhawk"	Paul Wendkos	Walter Black & Marion Hargrove	October 26, 1966	207
36	8	"Will the Real Good Guys Please Stand Up?"	Richard Sarafian	Rick Mittleman	November 2, 1966	208
37	9	"Bridge of Spies"	Alf Kjellin	Stephen Kandel	November 9, 1966	209
38	10	"One of Our Bombs Is Missing"	Earl Bellamy	Barry Oringer	November 16, 1966	210
39	11	"To Florence with Love: Part 1"	Robert Butler	Norman Borisoff	November 23, 1966	211
40	12	"To Florence with Love: Part 2"	Robert Butler	Norman Borisoff	November 30, 1966	212
41	13	"Lisa"	Richard Sarafian	Jackson Gillis	December 7, 1966	213
42	14	"Little Boy Lost"	Paul Wendkos	Chester Krumholz	December 14, 1966	214
43	15	"Father Abraham"	Tony Leader	Stephen Kandel	December 21, 1966	215
44	16	"Rome... Take Away Three"	Alf Kjellin	Story by : Bill S. Ballinger; Teleplay by : Morton Fine & David Freidkin & Bill S. Ballinger	December 28, 1966	216
45	17	"Tonia"	Alf Kjellin	Michael Zagor	January 4, 1967	217
46	18	"Child Out of Time"	Alf Kjellin	Morton Fine & David Friedkin	January 11, 1966	218
47	19	"The Trouble with Temple"	Tom Gries	Morton Fine, & David Friedkin	January 25, 1967	219
48	20	"The War Lord"	Alf Kjellin	Robert Culp	February 1, 1967	220
49	21	"A Room with a Rack"	David Friedkin	Michael Zagor	February 8, 1967	221
50	22	"Mainly on the Plains"	David Friedkin	Morton Fine & David Friedkin	February 22, 1967	222
51	23	"Get Thee to a Nunnery"	Alf Kjellin	Story by : Barbara Merlin & Milton Merlin; Teleplay by : Marion Hargrove	March 1, 1967	223
52	24	"Blackout"	Alf Kjellin	Barry Oringer	March 8, 1967	224
53	25	"Magic Mirror"	Tom Gries	Robert Culp	March 15, 1967	225
54	26	"Night Train to Madrid"	David Friedkin	Stephen Kandell	March 22, 1967	226
55	27	"Casanova from Canarsie"	Hal Cooper	Rick Mittleman	March 29, 1967	227
56	28	"Cops and Robbers"	Christian Nyby	Jerry Ludwig	April 12, 1967	228

=== Season 3: 1967–68 ===
No. overall	No. in season	Title	Directed by	Written by	Original release date	Prod. code
57	1	"Let's Kill Karlovassi"	Christian Nyby	Michael Zagor	September 11, 1967	301
58	2	"The Beautiful Children"	Earl Bellamy	Berkely Mather	September 18, 1967	302
59	3	"Laya"	Earl Bellamy	Morton Fine & David Friedkin	September 25, 1967	303
60	4	"The Medarra Block"	Earl Bellamy	Barry Oringer	October 2, 1967	304
61	5	"Philotimo"	Earl Bellamy	Ernie Frankel	October 9, 1967	305
62	6	"The Honorable Assassins"	Christian Nyby	Les & Tina Pine	October 16, 1967	306
63	7	"Now You See Her, Now You Don't"	Earl Bellamy	Jerry Ludwig	October 23, 1967	307
64	8	"Red Sash of Courage"	Christian Nyby	Oliver Crawford	October 30, 1967	308
65	9	"The Seventh Captain"	Earl Bellamy	Berkely Mather	November 13, 1967	309
66	10	"Apollo"	Earl Bellamy	Ernest Frankel	November 20, 1967	310
67	11	"Oedipus at Colonus"	Christian Nyby	Marion Hargrove	November 27, 1967	311
68	12	"The Lotus Eater"	Christian Nyby	Elick Moll & Joseph Than	December 11, 1967	312
69	13	"An American Empress"	Earl Bellamy	Elick Moll & Joseph Than	December 25, 1967	313
70	14	"Home to Judgment"	Richard C. Sarafian	Robert Culp	January 8, 1968	314
71	15	"Anyplace I Hang Myself Is Home"	Christian Nyby	Michael Zagor	January 15, 1968	315
72	16	"Tag, You're It"	Earl Bellamy	Story by : M.J. Waggoner; Teleplay by : Stephen Kandel	January 22, 1968	316
73	17	"A Few Miles West of Nowhere"	Arthur Marks	Jerry Ludwig	January 29, 1968	317
74	18	"This Guy Smith"	Ralph Senensky	Jackson Gillis	February 5, 1968	318
75	19	"Turnabout for Traitors"	Earl Bellamy	Ernest Frankel	February 19, 1968	319
76	20	"Happy Birthday Everybody"	Earl Bellamy	Morton Fine & David Friedkin	February 26, 1968	320
77	21	"Shana"	Christian Nyby	Robert Lewin	March 4, 1968	321
78	22	"The Name of the Game"	Earl Bellamy	Jerry Ludwig	March 11, 1968	322
79	23	"Suitable for Framing"	Earl Bellamy	Howard Dimsdale	March 25, 1968	323
80	24	"The Spy Business"	Christian Nyby	Story by : John Shannon; Teleplay by : Morton Fine and David Friedkin	April 1, 1968	324
81	25	"Carmelita Is One of Us"	Christian Nyby	Earl Barret and Robert C. Dennis	April 8, 1968	325
82	26	"Pinwheel"	Christian Nyby	Barry Oringer	April 15, 1968	326

=== Culp as writer ===
Top-billed series star Culp wrote the scripts for seven episodes (one of which he also directed), including the show's first broadcast episode, "So Long, Patrick Henry." Prior to joining I Spy, Culp wrote a pilot script for a proposed series in which he would have played an American character like James Bond. He took the script to his friend Carl Reiner, who recommended he meet with Sheldon Leonard, who was in the midst of creating I Spy. This script was eventually rewritten by Culp and produced as the episode "The Tiger." In the DVD audio commentary for the "Home to Judgment" episode, Culp reveals that his seven episodes were the only ones filmed exactly as written. He wrote them to establish a specific dramatic tone and level of quality for the other writers to follow. Nevertheless, Culp and Cosby were often dissatisfied with the frivolous and formulaic scripts they received and rewrote most of their dialog and improvised a great deal during filming.

=== Awards and nominations ===
- First-time actor Bill Cosby won three consecutive Emmy Awards for Outstanding Lead Actor in a Drama Series in 1966, 1967 and 1968 (becoming the first African-American male actor to do so). Robert Culp was also nominated in the same category for all three seasons of I Spy.
- Eartha Kitt, who played a drug-addicted cabaret singer in "The Loser" (written by Culp), was nominated in 1966 for an Emmy Award for Outstanding Single Performance by an Actress in a Leading Role in a Drama.
- In 1967 Culp was nominated for an Emmy for Outstanding Writing Achievement in a Drama for his third-season script "Home to Judgment."
- In addition to writing the theme music, Earle Hagen composed an original musical score for many episodes of the series, often flavored with the ethnic music of the Far East, Mexico or the Caribbean. Hagen received Emmy nominations for all three seasons of the show and won for the "Laya" episode in 1968.
- I Spy won as "Best Dramatic Series" at the 1967 Golden Globe Awards for its 1966–1967 season.

== Remakes ==
In I Spy Returns (1994), a nostalgic television movie (and unsold pilot episode for a new series), Culp and Cosby reprised their roles as Robinson and Scott for the first time since 1968. The original opening title sequence is reused with no changes other than the addition of the word 'Returns' beneath 'I Spy' and a new arrangement of the theme music. Cosby was the executive producer. Unlike the original series, the TV-movie was shot on videotape instead of film. Here, Robinson has become director of the agency, while Scott has left the business. However, the aging agents have to leap into action once again, this time to keep an eye on their children, Bennett Robinson (George Newbern) and Nicole Scott (Salli Richardson-Whitfield) who are now operatives. This was shown as a "CBS Movie Special" on February 3, 1994.

Culp again reprised the role of Kelly Robinson during a dream sequence in a 1999 episode of Bill Cosby's series Cosby titled "My Spy." Cosby's character falls asleep while watching I Spy on television and dreams he's caught up in an espionage adventure. With Cosby's name replaced with that of his character here, Hilton Lucas, the old title sequence was again faithfully recreated. (Culp had earlier appeared with Cosby in 1987 on The Cosby Show episode "Bald and Beautiful" as Cliff Huxtable's old friend "Scott Kelly", a merger of their I Spy characters' names.)

A film adaptation, also titled I Spy, followed in 2002 with Eddie Murphy and Owen Wilson. In this iteration, the character names are reversed, so Alexander Scott (Wilson) is now the white secret agent and Kelly Robinson (Murphy) the black athlete, now a boxer (it also changed the original premise of them both being agents, with Robinson being a civilian boxer who is essentially brought in to act as Scott's cover story while he carries out his mission). The film was initially a commercial and critical failure. In his 2009 Movie Guide, film critic Leonard Maltin describes the film as an "In-name-only reincarnation of the smart 1960s TV show.... An object lesson in bad screenwriting, with an incoherent story, and characters that make no sense."

== Merchandising ==
=== Original novels, comic books, and reference books ===
A number of original novels based upon the series were published, most written in the mid-to-late 1960s by Walter Wager under the pseudonym "John Tiger." The I Spy novels were published by Popular Library:

- I Spy (1965, no book series number on cover)
- I SPY #2: Masterstroke (1966)
- I SPY #3: Superkill (1967)
- I SPY #4: Wipeout (1967)
- I SPY #5: Countertrap (1967)
- I SPY #6: Doomdate (1967)
- I SPY #7: Death-Twist (1968)

The following tie-ins, not by Wager, were also published.

- Message from Moscow (1966) by Brandon Keith. This was a hardcover novel published for young readers by Whitman.
- I Spy (2002) by Max Allan Collins – novelization of the motion picture remake

Gold Key Comics published six issues of an I Spy comic book from August 1966 to September 1968.

- I Spy: A History and Episode Guide to the Groundbreaking Television Series by Marc Cushman and Linda J. LaRosa

=== Games ===
Ideal published a board game in 1965.

=== Soundtracks ===
Unlike many television series of the time, every episode of I Spy received an original score – as was the case with the other shows from Sheldon Leonard, like The Andy Griffith Show and The Dick Van Dyke Show. Earle Hagen, Leonard's regular composer, wrote the main theme and scored most of the episodes (collaborating on three with Carl Brandt; Hugo Friedhofer, Nathan Van Cleave, Robert Drasnin and Shorty Rogers also wrote music for the series). During the show's run, two albums of re-recorded music composed (except where indicated) and conducted by Hagen were released.

Music from the Television Series I Spy (Warner Bros. WS-1637, stereo; W-1637, mono):

1. I Spy (1:57)
2. Tatia (3:00)
3. Hi Yo Scotty (2:42)
4. Angel (2:44)
5. Away We Go to Tokyo (2:25)
6. Rickshaw Ride (2:50)
7. Away We Go to Mexico (2:18)
8. Ah So! (2:16)
9. The International Set (2:23)
10. Another Kind of Blues (2:46)
11. Fiesta Del Sol (2:05)
12. The Wonderfulness of You (2:23)
13. Made in Hong Kong (2:17)

I Spy (Capitol ST-2839):

1. I Spy (2:10)
2. Over the Wall (2:15)
3. Montezuma's Revenge (2:25)
4. Islands in the Sea (3:06)
5. The Golden Age (2:08)
6. The Voice in the Wind (Earle Hagen and Gene Lees) (2:58)
7. To Florence with Love (Hugo Friedhofer) (2:20)
8. Sophia (2:40)
9. Rots of Ruck (2:20)
10. There's No Escape (3:40)
11. Domingo (2:25)
12. The International Set (2:21)

In 2002, Film Score Monthly released a limited-edition disc of original soundtrack music from the series.

1. "So Long Patrick Henry": The Defector/Main Title (1:05)
2. Hong Kong/Elroy (1:25)
3. What's the Trouble? (1:05)
4. Keep Running/You Lose (4:10)
5. That's My Man (1:27)
6. Stop That Plane (2:25)
7. The Whistle Blows (2:14)
8. "007" (:45)
9. End Title (:52)
10. "The Time of the Knife": Tokyo/Jean and Kelly/Jean's Pad/Trailing (6:19)
11. Oops, the Troops!/Away We Go/Shiftycraft/Dead for Real (3:32)
12. "Turkish Delight": Away We Go to Mexico/Bye Bye Scotty/Rapido/On the Road Again/Trunk Store/Chicken Hearts/Lt Hernandez (5:14)
13. Taxi Tour (2:01)
14. Japanese Trick/Parting Is Such Sweet Sorrow/How About That/Babe, With Rocks (5:15)
15. End Title (:38)
16. "The Warlord": Burma/The Chase/And On and On/Of Some Value (9:14)
17. My Lord/She Is Chinese (4:47)
18. Prelude to Dreamsville/The General Dies (4:12)
19. Down the River (1:55)
20. "Mainly on the Plains": The Plaza/Main Title (3:19)
21. Don Silvando/Blonde Gothic/Travelin'/Sighted (3:37)
22. Don Quixote II/Attack/Upsy Daisy (4:45)
23. My Professor, the Nut/Wild Stuff/Goodbye Crooks (3:55)
24. Don Strikes/So Long, Don (2:41)
25. End Title (:38)

== Home media ==
The underlying rights to the original series are now owned by independent film company Peter Rodgers Organization, Ltd. (PRO), but original production company Triple F Productions remains the copyright holder.

Selected episodes of the series were made available on VHS in North America in the early 1990s.

Image Entertainment released the complete series on DVD in Region 1 in 2002, initially in a series of single-disc volumes (each with four episodes), which were later compiled into three box sets. The episodes were not presented in any particular order. In addition, Sony Pictures Home Entertainment released the 1994 reunion made-for-TV film on DVD in Region 1 on October 8, 2002.

In April 2008, Image/PRO reissued the series, this time organized in order of original broadcast, in three box sets, one for each season. This includes Robert Culp's bonus audio commentary on four episodes that he wrote (originally issued in 2002 on a single DVD called The Robert Culp Collection).

On March 7, 2014, it was announced that Timeless Media Group had acquired the rights to the series in Region 1 and will be releasing a complete series set on June 24, 2014.

In Region 4, Umbrella Entertainment has released all 3 seasons on DVD in Australia.

DVD Name	Ep #	Release date	
DVD Name	Ep #	Region 1	Region 4
I Spy Returns	1	October 8, 2002	N/A
I Spy Season 1	28	April 29, 2008	September 1, 2007
I Spy Season 2	28	April 29, 2008	December 1, 2007
I Spy Season 3	26	April 29, 2008	December 15, 2008
The Complete Series	82	June 24, 2014	

== Syndication ==
In September 1982, the religious cable channel Christian Broadcasting Network began airing I Spy nationwide on weeknights at 8:00 PM and continued to do so until 1985. In May 4, 1986, Nick at Nite added I Spy to its evening lineup at 9:00 and continued to air the program until September 9, 1988. In 2011, I Spy aired twice a day, six days a week, on FamilyNet. The series also airs in the United States on broadcast television channels Retro Television Network and the Soul of the South Network. In 2015, reruns of I Spy were pulled by the Aspire and Cozi TV networks as a result of allegations of sexual assault by Cosby.
