= Bold Venture (TV series) =

American adventure television series

- Genre: Action
- Written by: David Friedkin, Morton Fine, Don Brinkley, and E. Jack Neuman
- Starring: Dane Clark * Joan Marshall * Bernie Gozier * Mark Dana * Lisa Gaye * Karen Scott
- Country of origin: United States
- No. of episodes: 39

Production
- Producers: David Friedkin and Morton Fine
- Running time: 30 minutes
- Production company: Ziv

Original release
- Release: 1959

Related
- Bold Venture (radio series)

Bold Venture is a 30-minute American adventure television series that was syndicated in 1959. It was based on the radio series Bold Venture.

== Premise ==
Set in the Caribbean, the series depicted the adventures of Slate Shannon, an expatriate American who owned a 60-foot sloop, The Bold Venture, and a hotel, Shannon's Place, in Trinidad. Slate was "a lighthearted tough guy who sallies 'round exotic Caribbean locales on missions of derring-do." Sailor Duval, a young woman who was Shannon's ward, accompanied him in his adventures.

From week to week Shannon and Duval recovered treasures, fought gun-runners, rescued endangered people and encountered "smugglers, killers, and ... other shady characters". King Moses was a singer whose calypso music was heard in the background. He also sometimes narrated to connect segments of the story. Philip Keith-Barker was the police inspector. Leta was a dancer at the hotel, and Tina operated the island's only dance hall.

== Cast ==
- Slate Shannon - Dane Clark
- Sailor Duval - Joan Marshall
- King Moses - Bernie Gozier
- Philip Keith-Barker - Mark Dana
- Leta - Lisa Gaye
- Tina - Karen Scott
- Crew of the Bold Venture -Jerri Bender, Narda Onx, Joyce Taylor, Barbara Wilson

== Production ==
Bold Venture was a product of Ziv Television Programs. David Friedkin and Morton Fine (both of whom wrote for the radio version of the program) were the producers. Fredkin also directed some episodes. Other directors included William Conrad, Walter Doniger, Bernard L. Kowalski, Anton Leader, and John Rich. Writers were Fine, Friedkin, Don Brinkley, and E. Jack Neuman.

Ziv sold the show in 184 TV markets. Thirty-nine episodes were filmed at Ziv's Hollywood studios.

== Critical response ==
Newspaper columnist Eve Starr wrote about Bold Venture, "What makes the show stand out is its dialogue and its performances." She complimented Clark's work in the show.
