= Bold Venture =

American syndicated radio series (1951-1952)

- Slate (Humphrey Bogart) and Sailor (Lauren Bacall) cruise the Caribbean aboard the Bold Venture. (Bogart and Bacall pictured here on their private yacht Santana.)
- Genre: Adventure
- Running time: 30 minutes
- Country of origin: United States
- Language: English
- Syndicates: Frederic W. Ziv Company
- Starring: Humphrey Bogart; Lauren Bacall; Jester Hairston
- Written by: Morton Fine; David Friedkin
- Directed by: Henry Heyward
- Produced by: Santana Productions
- Original release: 1951 – 1952
- No. of episodes: 78

Bold Venture was a syndicated radio series starring Humphrey Bogart and Lauren Bacall that aired from 1951 to 1952. Morton Fine and David Friedkin scripted the taped series for Bogart's Santana Productions.

== Synopsis ==
Salty seadog Slate Shannon (Bogart) owns a Cuban hotel, Shannon's Place, sheltering an assortment of treasure hunters, revolutionaries, and other shady characters. With his sidekick and ward, the sultry Sailor Duval (Bacall), tagging along, he encounters modern-day pirates and other tough situations while navigating the waters around Havana. Aboard his boat, the Bold Venture, Slate and Sailor experience "adventure, intrigue, mystery and romance in the sultry settings of tropical Havana and the mysterious islands of the Caribbean."

Calypso singer King Moses (Jester Hairston) provided musical bridges by threading plot situations into the lyrics of his songs. Music for the series was by David Rose.

The series combined elements of a number of past Bogart/Bacall film collaborations, most notably To Have and Have Not which also cast Bogart as a boat owner in the Caribbean who reluctantly becomes involved in intrigue while romancing Bacall. The relationship between Shannon and King Moses, and his ownership of an inn, is strongly reminiscent of the dynamic between Rick Blaine and Sam in Casablanca.

== Production ==
Fredric Ziv, a syndicated transcribed program producer, presented Bogart and Bacall with an offer, "just record your lines and we'll do the rest".

Beginning in March 1951, the Frederic W. Ziv Company syndicated 78 episodes via electrical transcription. Heard on 423 stations, the 30-minute series earned $5,000 weekly for Bogart and Bacall.

All of Frederic Ziv's 40+ radio series (some 10,000 radio programs), including all 78 episodes of Bold Venture, were donated by the Ziv Estate to Media Heritage and exclusively licensed to Carl Amari who successfully launched a Kickstarter campaign to raise funds necessary to professionally transfer the complete run of Bold Venture. Soon, all 78 episodes will be available, including 18 "lost" Bold Venture episodes which have not been heard in more than 70 years. A definitive collection of all 78 Bold Venture episodes, which will include a detailed historical booklet, will be available beginning in 2024 through Amari's company. Amari plans to launch additional Kickstarter campaigns to raise funds necessary to release more complete runs of Ziv radio series, including Boston Blackie, I Was a Communist for the FBI, Favorite Story, Philo Vance and The Cisco Kid. Amari will launch a website in 2024 that offers these Ziv radio series at www.ZivRadio.com

== Radio episode guide ==
No.	Date	Title 1	Title 2	Title 3	Title 4	Title 5	Ref
1	March 26, 1951	Deadly Merchandise	Death By A Fighting Bird	Smuggling Arms	Gun Runners		
2	April 2, 1951	Kwan Yen Statue	Quam Yi Statue				
3	April 9, 1951	Bill of Lading	Six Crates of Apples	Opium Smugglers and Young Girl	White Envelope		
4	April 16, 1951	A Bullet for Shannon	Thugs and Slugs	Johnny Price Story			
5	April 23, 1951	Spanish Gold	Buried Treasure	Treasure on Flamingo Cay	Sunken Treasure at 20 Fathoms		
6	April 30, 1951	Murder of Franny Lane	He Who Laughs Last	Murder is No Joke	Slate Shannon Accused of Murder	Dixon and Lane	
7	May 7, 1951	Espionage & Murder in San Tomas	Atomic Espionage on San Thomas				
8	May 14, 1951	A Muncie Murderess in Havana	Blackmail is Dangerous to Your Health	That Gun Will Kill You			
9	May 21, 1951	False American Passports	Fake American Passports				
10	May 28, 1951	Sailor Framed For Murder	Calverts House of Mirrors				
11	June 4, 1951	Blue Moon					
12	June 11, 1951	The Tears of Siva	Star of Sheba				
13	June 18, 1951	Half Million Reasons to Find Cary Martin	We Want Cary Martin				
14	June 25, 1951	The High Price of Treason					
15	July 2, 1951	Russian Roulette					
16	July 9, 1951	Mystery of the Mary K					
17	July 16, 1951	The Chaney Wedding	Death At The Wedding	Frame Up			
18	July 23, 1951	12 Year Promise	Oil Wells				
19	July 30, 1951	Alice Ramsey's Husband	Poison Darts	Voodoo Vendetta in Paradise			
20	August 6, 1951	Search for Tommy Reed	Looking for Tommy Reed				
21	August 20, 1951	Ghost Ship					
22	August 27, 1951	Jennie Ward	Slate's Old Flame				
23	September 3, 1951	Terminal Key					
24	September 10, 1951	Phyllis Calvert Murders	Out of Control	Suicide or Murder			
25	September 17, 1951	Slate's Tuxedo Pocket	Black Tie Affair				
26	September 24, 1951	Murder in the Yucatán Peninsula	A Fatal Quest for Jade				
27	October 1, 1951	Shannon's a Sucker	Slate Shannon Sucker				
28	October 8, 1951	Slate Shannon Held for Ransom	Danger at Tina's Parakeet				
29	October 15, 1951	Camellias and a Ruby	A Camillia for El Dobbin				
30	October 22, 1951	Passage for Mario Carada					
31	October 29, 1951	Darby and Joan Incorporated	Lonely Hearts Inc.				
32	November 5, 1951	Mutineers of the S.S. Marino Victory	The Marino Victory Marino				
33	November 12, 1951	Slate Framed for Refinery Robbery	Bold Venture is Stolen				
34	November 19, 1951	Slate's Stolen DaVinci					
35	November 26, 1951	Paolo Framed for Jewel Robbery	Supapo's Greed				
36	December 3, 1951	Cruise To Batabano	Emilio Lopez Story				
37	December 10, 1951	Louis Gaspar Case	Slate's Stolen Identity	Bring Me The Body of Slate Shannon			
38	December 17, 1951	Tabard of Pizarro	Alice Markel poisoning)				
39	December 24, 1951	Paul Brewer Story	Escape From Guantanamo				
40	December 31, 1951	Carlos & Juan Ruiz Story	Crazy Old Carlo				
41	January 7, 1952	Innocent in Trujillo	Raul Mirado Execution				
42	January 14, 1952	An Invitation to Death	Four Invitations To Death				
43	January 21, 1952	Background Shots Can Kill You					
44	January 28, 1952	Revenge Equals Murder Times Two					
45	February 4, 1952	A Backstabbing at Shannon's Place	Joe Norman	The Laughing Sailor			
46	February 11, 1952	Isle Of Pines	I'm Going To Die	Rhoda Gonzalez			
47	February 18, 1952	The Dead Matt Jefferies	The One That Got Away				
48	February 25, 1952	Welcome to Civilization, Dead Man	Welcome Back, Dead Man	Man From Sumatra	George Carson Killed		
49	March 3, 1952	Ruthie Ryan's Father	The Big K.O.				
50	March 10, 1952	Spectre of El Indio					
51	March 17, 1952	Diamond Smuggling	Diamond Fencing Fisticuffs				
52	March 24, 1952	Robbed By Joe Ralston	Revenge Is Sweet	The Big Road			
53	March 31, 1952	Haven's Venezuelan Island	Tiny Haven	Gene Moore's Wife	Claudia	Runaway Wife	
54	April 7, 1952	Death Of Rudy Keijon	Friends Like These	Bob Yancy arrests Slate for murder	Fetsui Jade		
55	April 14, 1952	Sailor's Dead Husband	Marriage And Murder	Freddie Naye	Sailor is a Wealthy Widow		
56	April 21, 1952						
57	April 28, 1952						
58	May 5, 1952						
59	May 12, 1952	Señor Rufio	Señor Rufio's Legacy of Death				

== Television ==
Ziv brought Bold Venture to television in 1959 with 39 episodes directed by William Conrad. The series starred Dane Clark as Slate Shannon, Joan Marshall as Sailor Duval, and Bernie Gozier as King Moses. Mark Dana played Philip Keith Baker, Lisa Gaye played Leta, and Karen Scott played Tina. Morton Fine and David Friedkin were the producers.

Because of unstable conditions in Cuba, the setting was changed to Trinidad. Filming locations included the Iverson Movie Ranch in Chatsworth, California.

== Listen to ==
- Bold Venture (57 episodes) Internet Archive:
- Bold Venture (57 episodes)
- Episodes of Bold Venture
- Bold Venture on Way Back When
- Bold Ventures on Radio Lovers: (20 episodes)
- Bold Venture on Old Time Radio Outlaws
