= The War Lord (I Spy) =

- I Spy episode
- Episode no.: Season 2 Episode 20
- Directed by: Alf Kjellin
- Story by: Robert Culp
- Teleplay by: Robert Culp
- Cinematography by: Fouad Said
- Original air date: February 1, 1967

Guest appearances
- Jean Marsh as Katherine Faulkner; Cecil Parker as Sir Guy Faulkner; Patrick Barr as The General; Carl Rapp as Weaver; Bill Curran as Robert Carter

Episode chronology
← Previous "The Trouble with Temple"	Next → "A Room With a Rack"

"The War Lord" is the twentieth episode of the second season of the American comedy drama television series I Spy, originally aired on February 1, 1967 in the United States. Directed by Alf Kjellin, the episode was written by Robert Culp, who played one of the main characters of the series, Kelly Robinson; in this episode, he also played the guest character, Chuang Tzu.

== Plot ==
Kelly Robinson and Alexander Scott are assigned to rescue Katherine Faulkner, the daughter of a highly influential British arms producer, who has been kidnapped by a Chinese warlord in Burma; however, when they arrive, they find that not only was the kidnap a hoax, but Katherine is the War Lord's lover.

== Origins ==
Robert Culp wrote “The Warlord” with Julie Christie in mind, who had become a big star after appearing in "Darling," The script sat idle for a long time, until Leon Chooluk said they could make it work within budget if they filmed the episode on location in Spain. They never approached Christie for the part, instead casting Jean Marsh for the role of Katherine Faulkner. Culp wasn't initially excited about Jean Marsh, but realized later she was excellent for the part.

== Main cast ==
- Robert Culp as Kelly Robinson / Chuang Tzu
- Bill Cosby as Alexander Scott
- Jean Marsh as Katherine Faulkner
- Cecil Parker as Sir Guy Faulkner
- Patrick Barr as The General
- Carl Rapp as Weaver
- Bill Curran as Robert Carter

== See also ==
- I Spy
