= Hickey & Boggs =

1972 film by Robert Culp

- Theatrical release poster
- Directed by: Robert Culp
- Written by: Walter Hill
- Produced by: Fouad Said
- Starring: Bill Cosby; Robert Culp
- Cinematography: Bill Butler
- Edited by: David Berlatsky
- Music by: Ted Ashford
- Production company: Film Guarantors
- Distributed by: United Artists
- Release dates: September 20, 1972 (New York City); October 4, 1972 (United States)
- Running time: 111 minutes
- Country: United States
- Language: English
- Budget: $1 million

Hickey & Boggs is a 1972 American neo-noir crime film written by Walter Hill and directed by Robert Culp.

== Plot ==
Two weary, hard-luck private eyes Al Hickey and Frank Boggs are hired to find a missing woman. Their inquiries bring death to almost everyone around them, culminating in a violent conclusion.

== Cast ==
- Bill Cosby as Al Hickey
- Robert Culp as Frank Boggs
- Ta-Ronce Allen as Nyona's Daughter
- Rosalind Cash as Nyona
- Lou Frizzell as Lawyer
- Isabel Sanford as Nyona's Mother
- Sheila Sullivan as Edith Boggs
- Robert Mandan as Mr. Brill
- Michael Moriarty as Ballard
- Vincent Gardenia as Papadakis
- Ed Lauter as Ted
- Joe E. Tata as Coroner's Assistant
- James Woods as Lieutenant Wyatt

== Production ==
The script was an original of Walter Hill's who sold it to John Calley of Warner Bros. Hill said he wrote it with Jason Robards and Strother Martin in mind. "It wasn't intentionally written for a black and a white actor", he said.

Calley sent the script to Bill Cosby, who agreed to star in the film if Robert Culp would direct. (Culp had only directed one feature before, a documentary on Operation Breadbasket; he also had directed an episode of I Spy, which starred both Culp and Cosby.) Culp agreed and the film was greenlit. However Culp and Calley disagreed over the budget – originally put at $2.2 million – so Calley sold the script to Culp, who tried to raise the money himself.

Culp said he raised and lost the budget three times in eight months.

The budget was revised to $1 million; Fouad Said agreed to provide half the money; the other half came from Film Guarantors, a film financing arm of Taft Broadcasting. When United Artists came in as distributors, Said was repaid. it was Said's first film as a producer.

Culp then rewrote Hill's script. Hill said the script changed "by about twenty percent – not in terms of characters but the plot. I did advise the people involved not to play around with the plot because I thought it was a delicate structure, and if you pushed it, pulled it and tugged on it, a lot of it would fall down. But I think the characters held up pretty well."

Two weeks before filming, Culp had a hernia operation.

Culp estimated he left 50 minutes of the film on the cutting room floor.

"Win, lose or draw Hickey and Boggs is my version," said Culp. "Every bit of it".

Culp wanted to direct another film, a Western set in 1900 called Under the Sun, but it was never made.

== Reception ==
Walter Hill later said he felt the film "had some nice moments, but it was cast much differently than it was written. I wasn't too excited about it."

"It became a cult film," said Robert Culp in 1977. "It didn't earn me a nickel but the folks on the campuses liked it and it is used in several film courses."

A novelization of the film by Phillip Rock was published in 1972 by Popular Library.

=== Critical response ===
When the film was released, the staff at Variety magazine questioned the film's screenplay, writing, "Culp makes his directorial bow and Fouad Said, who started in the industry as cameraman on I Spy series, debuts as a producer. Latter should have paid more attention to story line of the Walter Hill screenplay, which suffers through audience never being entirely certain as to the identity of some of the characters...Somehow, the femme is connected with missing loot but audience is never let in on secret."

In the same vein, A. H. Weiler of The New York Times also panned the screenplay, writing, "...while Robert Culp, who is also making his directorial debut with this caper, shows a flair for action and eye-catching composition in sordid and serene views of Los Angeles where all the shooting takes place, Hickey and Boggs is not involved in a story or with characters really worthy of a full theatrical treatment. Let's say, that Walter Hill, a newcomer to the screen, has written a script that's long on complexity and short on character definition..."

Rex Reed's review of the film for the New York Daily News was scathing, criticizing Cosby's acting, Culp's "jumbled direction", and Hill's "incoherent", "undecipherable", and cliched script, concluding that the "dull" and "pointless" film was one of the worst of the year.

More recently, critic Glenn Erickson made the case that the film was a bit dark for its time, writing, "There's plenty of violence and a dandy concluding shootout on a beach, but Hickey & Boggs was probably just too much of a downer to appeal to wide audiences. Action pictures of the time tended to be broader fantasies with humor and a lighter touch; heavy-duty cop shows like Badge 373 and The Friends of Eddie Coyle passed quietly. There's a scene in the picture where Hickey suffers a blow to his family and his whole life goes sour. From that point on there's little hope of anything pleasant happening. By the time of the final showdown our heroes seem to be going through the motions propelled only by existential inertia."

On the review aggregator website Rotten Tomatoes, 67% of 6 critics' reviews are positive, with an average rating of 8.4/10.

== See also ==
- List of American films of 1972
