= The Most Deadly Game =

American television series (1970–71)

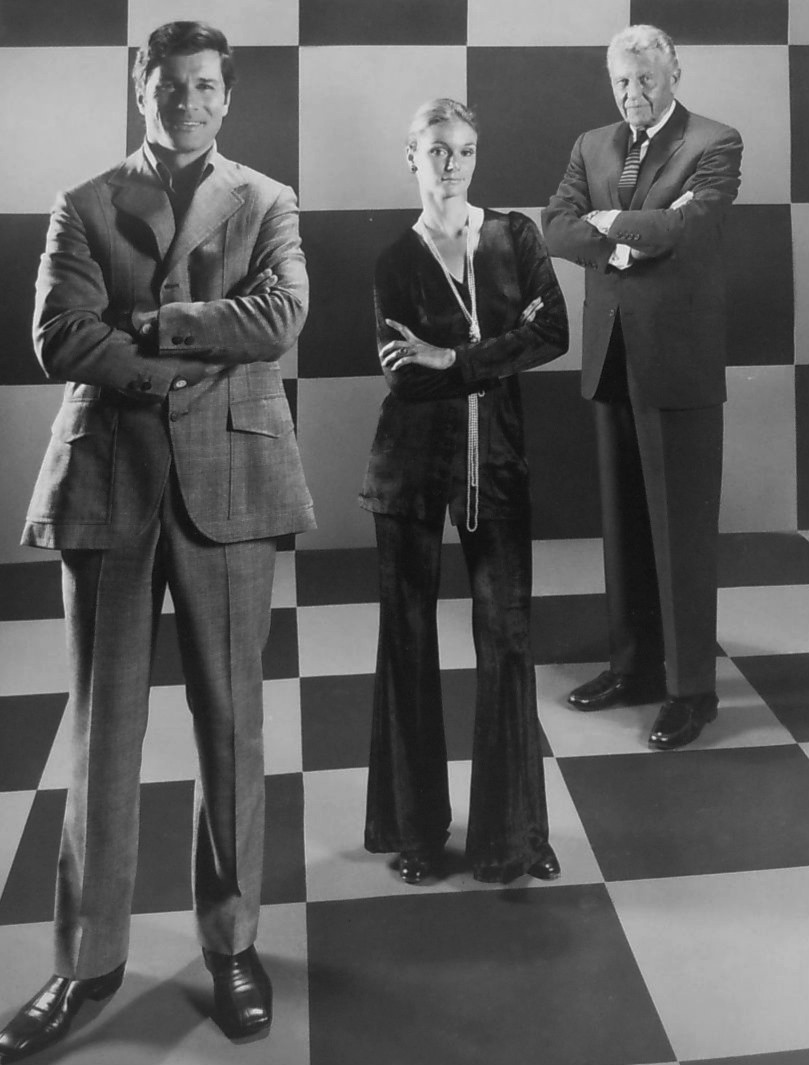
- George Maharis, Yvette Mimieux and Ralph Bellamy in a promotional photo
- Genre: Drama
- Created by: Morton S. Fine; David Friedkin
- Written by: Morton S. Fine; David Friedkin; Bernard C. Schoenfeld; Dirk Wayne Summers
- Directed by: David Friedkin; Lee Madden
- Starring: Ralph Bellamy; George Maharis; Yvette Mimieux
- Country of origin: United States
- Original language: English
- No. of seasons: 1
- No. of episodes: 12

Production
- Executive producers: Morton S. Fine; David Friedkin; Aaron Spelling
- Producer: Joan Harrison
- Running time: 48 minutes

Original release
- Network: ABC
- Release: October 10, 1970 – January 16, 1971

The Most Deadly Game is an American television series that ran for 12 episodes from 1970 to 1971. The series was produced by Aaron Spelling Productions, with Aaron Spelling as the executive producer. It stars Yvette Mimieux, Ralph Bellamy, and George Maharis.

== Overview ==
The series follows the lives of three criminologists who only take on high-profile cases.

== Cast ==
- Ralph Bellamy as Ethan Arcane
- George Maharis as Jonathon Croft
- Yvette Mimieux as Vanessa Smith

== Episodes ==
No.	Title	Directed by	Written by	Original release date	Prod. code
0	"Zig Zag"	David Friedkin	Morton S. Fine, David Friedkin	N/A	000
Unaired pilot.
1	"Little David"	Philip Leacock	Burton Wohl	October 10, 1970	009
2	"Witches' Sabbath"	Unknown	Unknown	October 17, 1970	007
3	"Gabrielle"	Unknown	Unknown	October 24, 1970	004
4	"Breakdown"	George McCowan	Leonard B. Kaufman	October 31, 1970	010
5	"Who Killed Kindness?"	Unknown	Andy White	November 7, 1970	012
6	"Photo Finish"	Norman Lloyd	John McGreevey	November 14, 1970	005
7	"War Games"	Lee Madden	Jack Miller	November 28, 1970	006
8	"Nightbirds"	Unknown	Unknown	December 12, 1970	003
9	"Model for Murder"	Unknown	Unknown	December 19, 1970	002
10	"The Classic Burial Position"	Unknown	Shimon Wincelberg	January 2, 1971	001
11	"The Lady from Praha"	Unknown	Unknown	January 9, 1971	011
12	"I, Said the Sparrow"	George McCowan	Marion Hargrove	January 16, 1971	013
