= Earplay =

American radio program

Earplay was the longest-running of the formal series of radio drama anthologies on National Public Radio, produced by WHA in Madison, Wisconsin and heard from 1972 into the 1990s. It approached radio drama as an art form with scripts written by such leading playwrights as Edward Albee, Arthur Kopit, Archibald MacLeish and David Mamet.

Airing in stereo, Earplay provided a showcase for original and adapted work. Eventually, the less-sustained successor series NPR Playhouse drew episodes from the Earplay run. Often presented by NPR member stations on a weekly basis, Earplay episodes were produced with much attention to recording technique and sound-effects.

In 1975, it scored a triumph with Listening, an original play written by Edward Albee for stereo radio, employing one speaker for one character and another speaker for another character. Since both characters are seated in a room, the illusion is created that they are in the same room as the listener. After its premiere on radio, Listening was later performed on stage.

Along with the CBS Radio Mystery Theater, Sears Radio Theater, The General Mills Radio Adventure Theater, Christian radio's Unshackled and Public Radio's The National Radio Theater of Chicago, Earplay was among the most ambitious nationwide projects in the medium in the U.S. during the 1970s and 1980s.

== Concept ==
With a grant from the National Endowment of the Arts, Earplay began in 1972 directed by Karl Schmidt, producer and radio executive at WHA in Madison, Wisconsin. Schmidt was determined to bring a new approach to radio drama. He faced major obstacles from other public radio broadcasters and had to prove the new approach would gain listeners. He enlisted the help of Tom Voegeli, a newcomer to the field of audio, but as the son of Don Voegeli (composer of NPR's All Things Considered theme music), he had the innate knowledge and enthusiasm that Schmidt wanted. (Tom has had a distinguished career in public broadcasting spanning 40 years). Another contributor was Martha Van Cleef fresh from her PhD at the UW and eager to recruit new writers to the medium.

It was she who convinced Edward Albee and Archibald MacLeish to write original dramas for Earplay. It was this that brought the program to the attention of BBC producers. Schmidt enlisted the aid of John Tydeman, an experienced BBC producer to oversee Albee's play, Listening. The three on them spent three days in a studio working with such stars as Irene Worth. MacLeish's play JB was adapted by Earplay.

== Production technique ==
In 1975, Earplay’s new executive producer, Howard Gelman, applied to the BBC for secondment. He worked in the script department alongside another newcomer to audio, John Madden, under the direction of BBC Head of Drama Martin Esslin and BBC Head of Scripts Richard Imison.

Madden and Gelman returned to Earplay in 1976, intent upon dispensing with traditional real time production and instead producing radio as if it were film, breaking productions into segments recorded in several takes without effects or music. They could record voices anywhere convenient to the talent, then edit multiple tracks on two-inch tape with a 24-track control board at studios in Madison, Wisconsin. Finished episodes were transferred to long-playing vinyl records for national distribution (later switching to cassette tapes).

Earplay was receiving over 25 scripts a week and Gelman and his colleague, David Patt, were working with writers and theatre and film directors to record actors in one or two days in one location and then add sound effects and music at its base studio. The result was a different sound that provided an immediacy and a more intimate listening experience.

Earplay‘s most successful production was Wings. Written by Arthur Kopit, the play explored the brain of a woman experiencing a stroke and subsequent recuperation. Wings won the Prix Italia for best radio drama of 1977. It was the first Earplay production staged for the theatre after its radio launch. Other plays reproduced in different media were Listening by Edward Albee, The Water Engine by David Mamet and Ladyhouse Blues by Kevin McCarthy. Other playwrights who wrote for Earplay include Israel Horowitz, Mark Medof and Archibald MacLeish.

== Funding dilemma ==
Earplay had to convince broadcasters that it could produce enough content to satisfy programming requirements. Distributing 30-minute dramas since its debut in 1973, producers changed to a one-hour format from 1976 until 1980, introduced by WFMT radio announcer Cary Frumkin; the result was 26 hour-long programs each year. Always expensive by public broadcasting prices, Earplay ultimately could not survive solely on station participation.

Contemporary radio productions used the same recording techniques as Earplay, but benefited from subject matter with broader appeal or from commercial sponsorship. These included an audio version of Star Wars, directed by John Madden and produced by Richard Toscan and Carol Titelman at Westlake Studios in Los Angeles; CBS Radio Mystery Theater produced by Himan Brown; and Elliott Lewis’ Sears Radio Theater.

Earplay abruptly left the air after losing its Arts funding in 1982. Its production techniques were adopted by several BBC producers and by ABC producers in Australia. Public Radio drama in the US reverted to local talent or community groups such as ZBS. Karl Schmidt, Tom Voegeli, John Madden and Howard Gelman went on to successful endeavors in radio, film and publishing.
