= Voyage of the Scarlet Queen =

Radio drama

Voyage of the Scarlet Queen was a radio drama portraying the adventures of the 78-foot ketch Scarlet Queen in the South Pacific. It was broadcast on Mutual from 3 July 1947 to 14 February 1948.

== Personnel ==
James Burton produced the scripts by Gil Doud and Robert Tallman. Elliott Lewis starred as Philip Karney, master of the Scarlet Queen, with Ed Max as first mate Red Gallagher.
Other voice actors include: Gloria Blondell, Lillian Buyeff, William Conrad, John Dehner, Verna Felton, Paul Frees, Frank Gerstle, Virginia Gregg, Ira Grossel, William Johnstone, Berry Kroeger, Jack Kruschen, Mary Lansing, Cathy Lewis, Roddy McDowall, Alan Reed, Rolfe Sedan, Charles Seel, Eric Snowden, Ben Wright, and Barton Yarborough.
Sound effects were provided by Ray Kemper, Tom Hanley, Bill James, considered among the best in the business.
Music was composed and conducted by Richard Aurandt.

== Scenario ==
Each episode opens with an entry from the ship's log, such as: "Log entry, the ketch Scarlet Queen, Philip Karney, master. Position – three degrees, seven minutes north, 104 degrees, two minutes east. Wind, fresh to moderate; sky, fair..." with a similar closing: "Ship secured for the night. Signed, Philip Karney, master." Arriving at an exotic port of call, the captain and first mate would go ashore and immediately run into trouble with local authorities, agents of rival merchants, or desperate women in need of rescue. After some investigation and at least one good fight they would solve the problem, get back on the ship and sail away, Karney and Gallagher sharing a laugh and a drink at the wheel before the captain's closing log entry.

== Principal characters ==
- Ship's Master Captain Philip Karney is a principled man of action who places mission above personal gain.
- First Officer Red Gallagher is a skilled bo'sun and a loyal sidekick to Karney, although the loyalty is suspect for the first few episodes.
- Ku Chei Kang, Karney's employer and the financier of the voyage of the Scarlet Queen, appears in only one episode, but figures prominently in episodes 1–21. Kang is the owner of the sprawling international "China Traders, Kang and Sons", offices of which are visited numerous times by Karney in those episodes.
- Constantino, a Portuguese crime lord or similar stature villain, is Kang's antagonist and the source of many (but by no means all) of the troubles that befall Karney and the Scarlet Queen. Constantino's many agents appear in the first 20 episodes, but Constantino himself does not appear until episode 21.
- Ah Sin is a remarkably obese, delicate, vain, educated and ruthless Chinese trader who speaks "like Charles Laughton" and surrounds himself with clouds of jasmine perfume. He appears in three episodes. Ah Sin has a sidekick, a Texan named Mangan who carried a pearl-handled frontier pistol. (Ah Sin was the name of an unrelated character in a Bret Harte poem and later a play by Harte and Mark Twain that attempted to expose American racist attitudes toward immigrant Chinese laborers in California. See The Heathen Chinee.)
- Henrietta "Hank" Ainley is a love interest of Karney who appears in two episodes. She is acted by Cathy Lewis, real-life wife of Captain Karney actor Elliott Lewis.
- Neilson is the crew member who is mentioned most by name and the only one with any speaking lines. He is voiced by Frank Driscoll in Episode 4 and by William Conrad in episode 20. Other crew members mentioned in the action include Cronin, Gordon, and Kohler.

== Changes from the pilot to the series ==
The pilot starred Howard Duff as Captain Phil Karney, and Elliott Lewis as First Officer Red Gallagher. For the series, Lewis took the role of Karney and Ed Max was brought on to play Gallagher. The pilot show mentions the ultimate villain as Van Gort; this becomes Constantino in the series. Other than a few edits to tighten up the script, The Death of David Malone (the pilot) is as effective as The Shanghai Secret (the first episode of the series) as an introduction to the drama.

== Dramatic basis and story arc ==
Episodes 1–20 chronicle the voyage from San Francisco through many meticulously detailed ports of call until they reach episode 20, "Kang's Treasure and the Ghost of Tangolan Bay". During this time Karney and Gallagher visit ports of call for resupply and further instructions from Kang, provided through local agents of Kang's sprawling Pacific trading operation. At nearly every step they are opposed by agents of Constantino. The "$10 million" prize is a set of ancient Chinese artifacts from every major period of Chinese history. Kang feels the artifacts will restore much needed pride to the people of devastated postwar China, while Constantino is simply greedy and knows that Kang will pay dearly for the artifacts. This climaxes at episode 21.

After Episode 21, Karney, Gallagher, and the Scarlet Queen have another dozen or so adventures, but the series seems to run out of steam without the Kang–Constantino rivalry and the continuity of the original story.

== The Scarlet Queen and the Starship Enterprise ==
The structure of the adventures, opening with a quote from the Ship's Log that introduces a sense of mystery of what is to come, and finishing with a final "captain's log" entry, with adventure in between, has been suggested as a forerunner to the much later Star Trek. The opportunities for inspiration are myriad, but they do not prove causation.

== Spelling of the captain's name ==
Many old-time radio websites exist with reviews of the show and downloads of episodes. Captain Phil Karney's name is spelled variously as Carney, Karney, and Kearney. An image of a Billboard magazine review of the show from August 1947 uses Kearney. However, the original scripts for "The Barefoot Nymph in the Mother Hubbard Jacket" and "The Ninth Niece in the Street of Weeping Women" use Karney. These scripts are in the UCLA library special collections Mort Fine collection boxes 51 and 52.

== Individual episodes ==
Voyage of the Scarlet Queen – Complete Log Fictitious locations are in quotes. Modern Google Maps place names are in parentheses.

Episode #	Date	Title	Location
Pilot	47-02-02	The Death of David Malone	San Francisco, CA
1	47-07-03	The Shanghai Secret	San Francisco, CA
2	47-07-10	Report of the White Jade Buddha	Honolulu, HI
3	47-07-17	The Spaniard & the Lascar Pirates	"Muninjima", Japan
4	47-07-24	The Boston Geisha & Chesapeake Bay	Kobe, Japan
5	47-07-31	Lily in the Chimoipo Bar (Chemulpo) (now known as Incheon)	Jinsen (Incheon) Korea
6	47-08-07	The White Cargo Act and Ah Sin	Tientsin (Tianjin), China
7	47-08-14	The Ninth Niece in the Street of Weeping Women (No known recording exists of this or Episode 10)	Shanghai, China
8	47-08-21	Story of the Eight Historic Periods	Swatow (Shantou), China
9	47-08-28	The Barefoot Nymph in the Mother Hubbard Jacket	Manila, Philippines
10	47-09-04	The Dead Man and The Boac Idol (No known recording exists of this or Episode 7)	Masbate, Philippines
11	47-09-11	Jewel Thieves and the Straw-Filled Dummy	Hong Kong
12	47-09-18	The Courtship of Anna May Lamour	Haiphong, Vietnam
13	47-09-25	Shore Leave and the Unhappy Wife	Singapore
14	47-10-02	The Fat Trader and the Sword of Apokaezhan	Sandakan, N Borneo
15	47-10-09	The Tattooed Beaver & Baby Food for Pare Pare	Makassar, Celebes (S. Sulawesi, Indonesia)
16	47-10-16	Ah Sin & the Balinese Beaux Arts Ball	Buleleng, Bali
17	47-10-23	Grafter's Fort and the Black Pearl of Galahla Bay	Batanta, Raja Ampat, W. Papua region of Indonesia
18	47-10-30	King Ascot And The Maid In Waiting	Karakelong, Celebes (Sulawesi, Indonesia)
19	47-11-06	Lonely Sultan of Isabella De Basilan	Isabela, Basilan, Philippines
20	47-11-13	Kang's Treasure and the Ghost of Tangolan Bay	Sangihe Island “Tangolan Bay” (Ruang, Tagulandang, Sulawesi, Indonesia)
21	47-11-20	Beautiful Girl in the Bargain Basement	Hong Kong
22	47-11-27	Huntsman's Quarry & the Dead Chinese	Fort-Bayard, Kouang-Tchéou-Wan (Zhanjiang)
23	47-12-03	The Green Tourist and the Temple Bell	Bà Rịa, Vietnam
24	47-12-10	The Wandering Master and the Warlord at Rest	Rabaul, New Britain, Papua/New Guinea
25	47-12-17	Red Beard and the Bag of Pearls	Hull Island (Orona), Phoenix Group
26	47-12-24	The 15th Lama and the Wise Guy from the East	Christmas Island (Kiritimati)
27	47-12-31	Hattie McCormick and the Patient Stowaway	Pago Pago, Tutuila, American Samoa
28	48-01-07	The Derelict and the Wandering Boy	Port Moresby, New Guinea
29	48-01-14	Fang Rubies and the Black Siamese	Darwin, Northern Territory, Australia
30	48-01-21	The Ambitious Hostess on South Bridge Road	Singapore
31	48-01-28	The Bubble Dancer & the Buccaneers	Penang, Malaysia
32	48-02-04	The Pegleg Skipper & the Iberian Blade	Surabaya, Java
33	48-02-11	Rocky III and the Dead Man's Chest	Wellington, NZ
34	48-02-18	Queen Anne Pistols and the Dealer on King George Road	Sydney, Australia
35	48-02-25	Winchester Rifle and the Ambitious Groom	Singapore
Pilot 2	50-05-06	Log Of The Black Parrot	(pilot for series revival)

== Assessment ==
Technically the show was among the better radio productions of the time, employing realistic sound effects and sailing terminology, well paced stories and colorfully detailed settings. Most places visited by the Queen are real. Even the map coordinates given by the captain are mostly accurate, following a zigzag course around the South Pacific.

== Follow-ups ==
After the show was cancelled, an attempt was made to revive it under a different name. Only the audition show was produced which was not picked up. The new show's title was to be The Log Of The Black Parrot. The cast included Ed Max, Ted Osborne, Lillian Buyeff, Harold Hughes, Jack Kruschen, and Ben Wright. Music was directed by Walter Schumann and composed by Nathan Scott. The audition was produced by the star of Scarlet Queen, Elliot Lewis and directed by Gil Doud. The announcer was Bob Stevenson. It was recorded on May 6, 1950.

A TV pilot was made in 1975 loosely based on the same concept, titled The Log of the Black Pearl, which likewise included Jack Kruschen in the cast, co-starring with Ralph Bellamy and Kiel Martin, with Jack Webb as executive producer.
