= NPR Playhouse =

American radio drama series

NPR Playhouse was a series of radio dramas from National Public Radio. The series was a successor to the NPR series Earplay and was discontinued in September 2002.

Beginning on March 1, 1981, the Playhouse production of the first of the Star Wars radio dramas, a 13-part 6½-hour version of the original Star Wars film, generated the largest response in NPR's history, with an audience averaging over 750,000 listeners per episode. A 14th episode was produced for this series consisting of an audio documentary of the production. The series author, Brian Daley, also wrote the script to the audio drama "Rebel Mission to Ord Mantell", which precedes The Empire Strikes Back and succeeds Star Wars: A New Hope.

In 1985 producer/director Roger Rittner produced the acclaimed Adventures of Doc Savage series for NPR Playhouse. The 13-episode series consisted of serialized versions of two of Lester Dent's Doc Savage pulp novels.

Among the broadcasts in its final season were the science fiction/fantasy anthology 2000X, the Radio Tales series of dramatizations of classic literature and mythology, and the Los Angeles-based Open Stage.

The dramatic-reading series Selected Shorts continued as the only national program devoted to regular offerings of radio drama, leaving aside the sketches on A Prairie Home Companion and Le Show and the intermittent presentation of drama on the largely documentary series The Next Big Thing.

The series aired selected productions from the CBC horror-anthology series Nightfall in the early 1980s.
