= Broadway Is My Beat =

American radio crime drama

- Anthony Ross as Detective Danny Clover in Broadway Is My Beat
- Country of origin: United States
- Language: English
- Syndicates: CBS
- Starring: Anthony Ross; Larry Thor
- Announcer: Bern Bennett; Bill Anders
- Written by: Morton S. Fine; David Friedkin
- Directed by: Elliott Lewis
- Produced by: Elliott Lewis
- Original release: February 27, 1949 – August 1, 1954
- Opening theme: I'll Take Manhattan

Broadway Is My Beat, a radio crime drama, ran on CBS from February 27, 1949 to August 1, 1954.

== Characters and story ==
The opening theme of "I'll Take Manhattan" introduced Detective Danny Clover, a hardened New York City cop who worked homicide "from Times Square to Columbus Circle—the gaudiest, the most violent, the lonesomest mile in the world."

Danny Clover narrated the tales of the Great White Way to the accompaniment of music by Wilbur Hatch and Alexander Courage, and the recreation of Manhattan's aural tapestry required the talents of three sound effects technicians (David Light, Ralph Cummings, Ross Murray). Bill Anders was the show's announcer, as was Joe Walters.

The supporting cast included regulars Charles Calvert (as Sgt. Gino Tartaglia) and Jack Kruschen (as Sgt. Muggavan), John Forsythe (as Tom), with episodic roles filled by television, radio, and film stars such as Eve McVeagh, and such radio actors as Irene Tedrow, Barney Phillips, Virginia Gregg, Anthony Barrett, Herb Butterfield, Lamont Johnson, Herb Ellis, Hy Averback, Edgar Barrier, Betty Lou Gerson, Cathy Lewis, Harry Bartell, Sheldon Leonard, Martha Wentworth, Lawrence Dobkin, Howard McNear, and Mary Jane Croft.

== Closing ==
Time was elastic, a fairly easy trick in the theater of the mind. Stories closed, more often than not on a pensive, melancholy note, quickly after the climax of the program. Rarely was the case reviewed; more likely Clover would philosophize, as in the show's opening, with a bit of prose that ran from purple to stunningly poignant, ending in a reprise of the show's setup, e.g.:

Broadway is sleeping now... the furious avenues of the night are still... only the sleepwalkers are there... the seekers, the sodden... it's Broadway. The gaudiest. The most violent. The lonesomest mile in the world. Broadway... my beat!

== Production ==
With Anthony Ross portraying Times Square Detective Danny Clover, the show originated from New York City through May 29, 1949. Beginning on July 7, 1949, it originated from Hollywood. Larry Thor began playing Clover with the program's move to the west coast.

The series featured music by Robert Stringer, and scripts by Peter Lyon. John Dietz directed for producer Lester Gottlieb (eventually succeeding him as producer). Bern Bennett was the original announcer.

When the series was broadcast from Hollywood, producer Elliott Lewis directed a new cast in scripts by Morton S. Fine and David Friedkin.

== Critical response ==
A review in the trade publication Variety called the program "another whodunit with an incidental Gotham background that should appeal to the mystery fans." The review also mentioned "smoothly meshing production gears, solid performances by an ace cast and some firstrate (sic) musical scoring by Robert Stringer."
