= Eve McVeagh =

American actress (1919–1997)

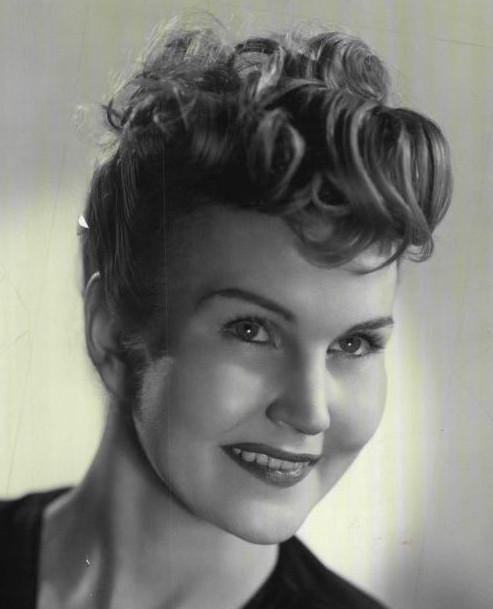
- McVeagh publicity photo for Snafu on Broadway (1945)
- Born: Eva Elizabeth McVeagh; July 15, 1919; Cincinnati, Ohio, U.S.
- Died: December 10, 1997 (aged 78); Los Angeles, California, U.S.
- Occupation: Actress
- Years active: 1937–1989
- Spouse(s): Gene Rizzi (m. 1939–1947; divorced); William C. Appleby (m. 1947–1956; his death); Robert Cole (m. 1956; divorced); Clarke Gordon (m. 1957–her death)
- Children: 4

Eva Elizabeth "Eve" McVeagh (July 15, 1919 – December 10, 1997) was an American actress of film, television, stage, and radio. Her career spanned 52 years from her first stage role through her last stage appearance. Her roles included leading and supporting parts as well as smaller character roles in which she proved a gifted character actress.

== Early life ==
Born in Cincinnati, Ohio to Hugh McVeagh, a railroad clerk, and Eva E. Johnson, she moved to Los Angeles in 1923 with her widowed mother and maternal grandmother, Molly Johnson, where she started acting in theater in her teens.

== Stage ==
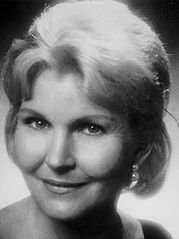
Eve McVeagh Headshot circa 1965

Following stage success in Hollywood, McVeagh moved to New York City in her 20s, performing on radio and on Broadway in several productions including the roles of Martha in Snafu (1944–1945) and Patsy Laverne in Too Hot for Maneuvers (1945). After the well received Broadway run of Snafu, McVeagh took over the female lead at The National Theater in Washington DC in 1945.

In 1947, McVeagh played a supporting role opposite Billie Burke and Grant Mitchell in the original play Accidentally Yours. The production received very favorable reviews on the West Coast and was en route to New York where it was predicted to be the "comedy smash hit of 1948". However, the production was not a commercial success and never made it to Broadway. Ms McVeagh did not perform on Broadway again, but after returning to Los Angeles, and working in film and television for years, she traveled back to New York to perform in the play Scuba Duba in 1971.

After this stage work, McVeagh traveled back to her home base in Los Angeles. She starred in West Coast premieres of Broadway shows at the Pasadena Playhouse, most notably the lead in Come Back Little Sheba. Her Hollywood theater work included one year as Martha in Who's Afraid of Virginia Woolf?

Her stage career continued in Las Vegas in 1981 in The Ninety Day Mistress, playing the mother of June Wilkinson's character. She continued to act in small stage productions including several with the award-winning Theatre Forty Company in Beverly Hills. In Hollywood, her final role was as a member of a lesbian couple in 1989 concluding an over 50 year stage career.

== Film ==
McVeagh's first film appearance was a supporting role in the classic High Noon (1952) in which she played Mildred Fuller alongside Gary Cooper and Grace Kelly. In the early 1950s she was under contract with Columbia Pictures. During that time, she co-starred in Tight Spot as Clara Moran playing the sister of Ginger Rogers: Of her performance, The New York Times raved "For our money, the best scene, whipped up by scenarist William Bowers, is the anything-but-tender reunion of Miss Rogers and her sister, Eve McVeagh ... an ugly, blistering pip." Ms. McVeagh was also featured opposite Richard Widmark and Lauren Bacall in The Cobweb as Shirley Irwin. She starred as Viv in The Glass Web, and was featured as Mrs. Clinton in Three in the Attic, Mrs. Masters in The Way West, Mrs. Griggs in Crime & Punishment, USA, a reporter in the Dino De Laurentiis production of King Kong, and The Graduate. Her final co-starring film role was in the independent film Money to Burn (1983) as Vivian. Her last onscreen appearance was a cameo role in Creator (1985) with Peter O'Toole. Ms. McVeagh's contributions to film were recognized by the bestowal of full voting membership in the actor's branch of the Academy of Motion Picture Arts and Sciences in September 1974. Her contributions in film spanned 33 years.

== Television ==
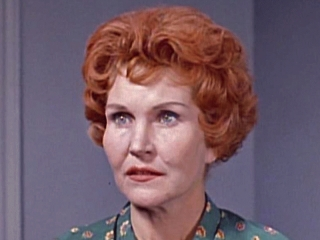
McVeagh, a Hitchcock favorite, as Georgia in "Incident at a Corner" (1960)

McVeagh's career in television began in 1946 as a primary cast member in the first American network Soap Opera, Faraway Hill. Other notable early television series on which she guest starred included Dragnet and I Love Lucy (as Lucy's hairdresser, Roberta, in the classic "Black Wig" episode). She was featured in three episodes of Perry Mason and two episodes of The Twilight Zone, and was a regular guest on The Johnny Carson Show. Alfred Hitchcock notably hired actors he liked regularly. McVeagh was featured in four episodes of Alfred Hitchcock Presents and two episodes of The Alfred Hitchcock Hour ("Last Seen Wearing Blue Jeans" in 1963). She co-starred on the Hitchcock-directed episode, "Incident at a Corner", of the television series Startime (pictured). Roles in the 1960s also included Frances Moseby, a series regular, on The Clear Horizon, a recurring character, Miss Hammond, on Petticoat Junction, as well as roles on Bonanza, Ironside and My Three Sons. Continuing in the 1970s, she appeared in the 1972 television movie "The Daughters of Joshua Cabe".

McVeagh was a regular on The Red Skelton Show for its last season. She also regularly performed in guest spots in Room 222 and McMillan & Wife. A favorite of Lucille Ball going back to I Love Lucy, she appeared with her on Here's Lucy. She guest starred in Love, American Style, and was featured in Little House on the Prairie, The Streets of San Francisco, The Virginian, The Bionic Woman, Charlie's Angels, The Jeffersons, Lou Grant, The Incredible Hulk, Knots Landing, Hill Street Blues, Hunter, and Airwolf. She rounded out the 1970s on a high note as socialite Helen Carrington in the 1979 critically acclaimed television movie Murder by Natural Causes with Hal Holbrook.

In the 1980s, her last decade in entertainment, McVeagh co-starred in an episode of Michael Landon's Highway to Heaven and was featured in two episodes of Simon & Simon. McVeagh guest starred in a 1985 episode of Cagney and Lacey as Dorothy Gantney, the grief-stricken mother of a murder victim in "The Psychic". McVeagh's last television credit was in 1988 on an episode of the Pat Morita series Ohara as Mabel Moore. Her career in television spanned 42 years.

== Radio ==
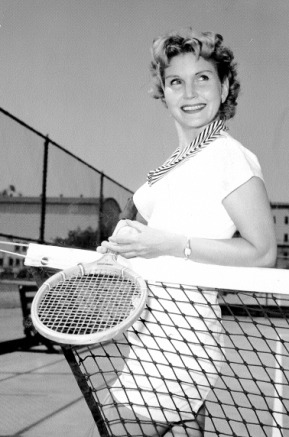
Eve McVeagh CBS Publicity Photo (1952)

Photograph (right) was taken for "Let's Play Tennis Week" a charity event with stars of that era.

During the "Golden Age of Radio", McVeagh had several leading and supporting series roles and episodic leads in the 1940s and 1950s. She played Mrs. Harriet Beatty on the "Clyde Beatty Show", and was a regular on "Broadway Is My Beat" and "Stars Over Hollywood". She starred in "Hollywood Hostages", an episode of "Suspense", as Grace. McVeagh was a principal performer on "Jeff Regan, Investigator", Jack Webb's radio noir series. "McVeagh's ditzy—and sultry—characterizations were regularly featured" in the series. She also played the lead in the role of convicted murderess Marie Lafarge in the 1953 episode of Crime Classics, "The Seven Layered Arsenic Cake of Madame Lafarge". McVeagh appeared as the title character in the May 29, 1960 episode of "Gunsmoke" entitled "Bad Seed" and again in the January 29, 1961 episode entitled "Harriet".

== Acting and voice coach ==
McVeagh was an acting and voice coach at Tony Barr's Film Actors Workshop at Warner Brothers Studios. Additionally, she taught privately and guest lectured at the University of Southern California in the School of Theatre.

== Family life ==
McVeagh was married to character actor and director Clarke Gordon (her fourth husband) at the time of her death and had four children and nine grandchildren.

== Death ==
Eve McVeagh Gordon died on December 10, 1997, from natural causes in Los Angeles. She was 78 years old.

== Stage, Radio, Television and Film Credits ==
Year	Title	Role	Notes
1943	Silk Hat Harry	Jayne Spence	Stage (Music Box Theater, Hollywood – original cast)
1944–1945	Snafu	Martha	Stage (Broadway – original cast)
1945	Too Hot for Maneuvers	Patsy Laverne	Stage (Broadway – original cast)
1946	Faraway Hill	Series Regular	Television Soap Opera. First soap opera on American Television network.
1947	Public Prosecutor	Dorcas Lyndon	TV series, 1 episode
1947	Accidentally Yours	Jean Erwin	Stage (Touring Company – original cast – see "Stage" section for more details)
1948–1950	Jeff Regan, Investigator	Principal Actor	CBS Radio Series
1950–1951	Clyde Beatty Show	Mrs. Harriet Beatty	Syndicated Radio Series
1949–1954	Broadway Is My Beat	Series Regular	CBS Radio Series
1952–1954	Stars Over Hollywood	Series Regular	CBS Radio Series
1952	Racket Squad	Guest Star	TV series, 1 episode
1952	High Noon	Mildred Fuller	Film
1952	Your Jeweler's Showcase		TV series, 1 episode
1952-1953	Schlitz Playhouse	Elly	TV series, 2 episodes
1953	Crime Classics	Madame Marie Lafarge	Episode: "The Seven Layered Arsenic Cake of Madame Lafarge" (CBS Radio Series)
1953	The Glass Web	Viv	Film
1953	Life with Luigi		TV series, 1 episode
1954	Dragnet		TV series, 1 episode
1951-1954	Fireside Theatre	Marge / Murial Tannant	TV series, 4 episodes
1954	I Love Lucy	Roberta	TV series, 1 episode
1954	Climax!		TV series, 1 episode
1955	The Ford Television Theatre	Suzie	TV series, 1 episode
1955	Tight Spot	Clara Moran	Film
1955	Stage 7	Miss Shelby	Episode: "The Traveling Salesman" (TV series)
1955	The Cobweb	Mrs. Shirley Irwin	Film
1955	Not as a Stranger	Mr. Ferris	Film, Uncredited
1955	Crossroads	Myrtle Greenspant	TV series, 1 episode
1955	I'll Cry Tomorrow	Ethel	Film, Uncredited
1955	It's a Dog's Life	Elsa, Piano Player	Film, Uncredited
1955	I Led 3 Lives	Miss Cutler	TV series, 1 episode
1956	Crusader	Pearl Winacheck	TV series, 1 episode
1956	The 20th Century-Fox Hour	Nurse	TV series, 1 episode
1956	Science Fiction Theatre	Ann Page	TV series, 1 episode
1956	Highway Patrol	Mrs. West	TV series, 1 episode
1956	Reprisal!	Nora Shipley	Film, Uncredited
1956	The Opposite Sex	Departing Woman	Film, Uncredited
1956	The Rack	Woman at Airfield	Film, Uncredited
1956	Suspense	Grace	Episode: "Hollywood Hostages" (CBS Radio Series)
1957	The Shadow on the Window	Bessie Warren	Film, Uncredited
1957	The Jack Benny Program	Reunion Guest	TV series, 1 episode
1957	Sierra Stranger	Ruth Gaines	Film
1957	Adventures of Superman	Mrs. Wilson	TV series, 1 episode
1957	The George Sanders Mystery Theater	Thelma	TV series, 1 episode
1957	Casey Jones	Nell Dixon	TV series, 1 episode
1958	The Court of Last Resort	Edith Elwell	TV series, 1 episode
1958	Mike Hammer	Veronica Karnes	TV series, 1 episode
1958	The Left Handed Gun	Mrs. McSween	Film, Uncredited
1958	General Electric Theater	Woman	TV series, 1 episode
1958	Unwed Mother		Film
1958	Man with a Camera	Mrs. Collins	TV series, 1 episode
1959	Alcoa Theatre	Miss Bellows	TV series, 1 episode
1959	Crime and Punishment U.S.A.	Mrs. Griggs	Film
1959	The Thin Man	Dakota Dane	TV series, 1 episode
1959	Rawhide	Beulah	TV series, 1 episode
1959	Dennis the Menace	Mrs. Purcell	TV series, 1 episode
1959	Alfred Hitchcock Presents	Waitress	Season 5 Episode 4: "Coyote Moon"
1960	Johnny Ringo	Molly Crawford	TV series, 1 episode
1957-1960	Perry Mason	Saleswoman / Laura Richards / Nora Fleming	TV series, 3 episodes
1960	Lawman	Josie, Saloon Gal	TV series, 1 episode
1960	Riverboat	Julie Scott	TV series, 1 episode
1960	Man on a String	Madame Pusawa	Film, Uncredited
1960	Startime	Georgia	TV series, Episode: "Incident at a Corner"
1960	The Clear Horizon	Frances Moseby (1960–1962)	TV series
1960	The Wizard of Baghdad	Oracle	Film, Uncredited
1961	Alfred Hitchcock Presents	Eve the Reporter (uncredited)	Season 6 Episode 31: "The Gloating Place"
1961	Coronado 9	Laura Tyler	TV series, 1 episode
1961	Surfside 6	Blosson McKenzie	TV series, 1 episode
1961	The Real McCoys	Myra McCoy	TV series, 3 episodes
1961	Tales of Wells Fargo	The Woman	TV series, 1 episode
1961	Cain's Hundred	Bunny Baxter	TV series, 1 episode
1962	Alfred Hitchcock Presents	Mrs. Archer	Season 7 Episode 20: "The Test"
1962	Alfred Hitchcock Presents	Mae	Season 7 Episode 30: "What Frightened You, Fred?"
1962	Checkmate	Bess Conrad	TV series, 1 episode
1962	Have Gun - Will Travel	Katherine	TV series, 1 episode
1962	Thriller	Bonnie / Mrs. Curtis	TV series, 2 episodes
1962	The Law and Mr. Jones	Mrs. Pierce	TV series, 1 episode
1962	The Tall Man	Lily Varnell	TV series, 1 episode
1963	The Alfred Hitchcock Hour	Rose Cates	Season 1 Episode 28: "Last Seen Wearing Blue Jeans"
1963	The Lieutenant	Marge Fowler	TV series, 1 episode
1961–1963	77 Sunset Strip	Landlady / Elizabeth Dawson	TV series, 2 episodes
1962-1963	Wagon Train	Mrs. Sharp / Yolanda	TV series, 2 episodes
1963	Petticoat Junction	Miss Hammond	TV series, 3 episodes
1964	Arrest and Trial	Mrs. Nello	TV series, 1 episode
1964	Twilight Zone	Ella Koch / Nurse	TV series, 2 episodes
1964	Karen	Mrs. Peters	TV series, 1 episode
1965	The Man from U.N.C.L.E	Baroness	TV series, 1 episode
1965	The Alfred Hitchcock Hour	Sylvia Boggs	Season 3 Episode 27: "The Second Wife"
1965	Dr. Kildare	Dr. Ruth Becker	TV series, 1 episode
1965	Daniel Boone	Eleanor Tully / Kate Bothwell	TV series, 1 episode
1966	Hank	Miss Krimmer	TV series, 1 episode
1966	My Favorite Martian	Mother	TV series, 1 episode
1966	My Mother the Car	Goldie	TV series, 1 episode
1966	F Troop	Wilma McGee	TV series, 1 episode
1966	My Three Sons	Clara	TV series, 1 episode
1967	The F.B.I.	Bea Jensen	TV series, 1 episode
1967	The Way West	Mrs. Masters	Film
1967	Bonanza	Harriet Guthrie	TV series, 1 episode
1967	The Graduate	Mrs. Carlson, Party Guest	Film, Uncredited
1968	Ironside	Manager	TV series, 1 episode
1968	Three in the Attic	Mrs. Clinton	Film
1969	Mayberry R.F.D.	Mrs. Whitakker	TV series, 1 episode
1969	Dragnet	Mrs. Shore / Margaret Chance / Bonnie McKenzie	TV series, 3 episodes
1969	Roberta	Anna	TV movie
1969	The Virginian	Mrs. Foster / Maude	TV series, 2 episodes
1970	Airport	Mrs. Henry Bron, Passenger	Film, Uncredited
1970	The Liberation of L.B. Jones	Miss Griggs	Film
1970	The Odd Couple	Mrs. Lachman	TV series, 1 episode
1970–1971	The Red Skelton Show	Series Regular (Various Characters)	Television Variety Series
1969-1971	Room 222	Madge Morano / PTA member	TV series, 2 episodes
1971	Love, American Style	Eloise Hempsted	TV series, 1 episode, (segment "Love and the Artful Codger")
1971	Scuba Duba	Landlady	Stage Studio Arena Theater (Buffalo, NY)
1972	Glass Houses		
1972	The Courtship of Eddie's Father	Lorraine Karn	TV series, 1 episode
1972	The Daughters of Joshua Cabe	Mother Superior	TV movie
1972	Alias Smith and Jones	Woman	TV series, 1 episode
1973	The Streets of San Francisco	Mrs. Logan	TV series, 1 episode
1973	Here's Lucy	Woman with Dog	TV series, 1 episode
1968-1973	Adam-12	Margaret Willis / Marge Jenkins / Thelma Walker	TV series, 3 episodes
1972-1974	McMillan & Wife	Lady in Elevator / Mrs. Denny / Woman	TV series, 3 episodes
1974	The Snoop Sisters	Coven Member	TV series, 1 episode
1974	Police Story	Ethel	TV series, 1 episode
1974	Movin' On	Rosalie	TV series, 1 episode
1975	The Texas Wheelers	Mrs. Klate	TV series, 1 episode
1975	Little House on the Prairie	Mrs. Hillstrom	TV series, 1 episode
1975	Maude	Renee	TV series, 1 episode
1976	King Kong	Reporter	Film, Uncredited
1977	The Bionic Woman	Middle Aged Woman	TV series, 1 episode
1979	Charlie's Angels	Old Lady (with Lasso)	TV series, 1 episode
1979	Murder by Natural Causes	Helen Carrington	TV movie
1979	Barnaby Jones	Millie Kelley	TV series, 1 episode
1980	Days of Our Lives	Mrs. Kositchek (Recurring)	Television Soap Opera
1980	Spoon River Anthology	Several Characters	Stage (Theatre Forty Company, Beverly Hills)
1980	The Jeffersons	Mrs. Simpson	TV series, 1 episode
1980	CHiPs	Wife	TV series, 1 episode
1979-1981	Lou Grant	Clare / Elizabeth Benson	Television
1981	The Incredible Hulk	Landlady	TV series, 1 episode
1982	Long Day's Journey Into Night	Mary	Stage (Richmond Shepard Theater Studios, Hollywood)
1982	Knots Landing	Mrs. Green	TV series, 1 episode
1982	Life of the Party: The Story of Beatrice	Mrs. Rugolo	TV movie
1982	Hill Street Blues	Tenant	TV series, 1 episode
1983	Knight Rider	Slot Granny	TV series, 1 episode
1983	Money to Burn	Vivian	Film
1984	Jennifer Slept Here	Mrs. McGovern	TV series, 1 episode
1984	Hunter	Mrs. Onadon	TV series, 1 episode
1984	Airwolf	Annie	TV series, 1 episode
1985	Highway to Heaven	Flora	TV series, 1 episode
1985	T. J. Hooker	Manager	TV series, 1 episode
1985	Creator	Woman with monkey	Film
1985	Cagney & Lacey	Dorothy Gantney	TV series, 1 episode
1985-1986	Simon & Simon	Mrs. Talbot	TV series, 2 episodes
1987	Mathnet	Mrs. Swaggle	TV series, 1 episode
1987	Square One TV	Mrs. Swaggle	TV series, 1 episode
1988	Ohara	Mabel Moore	TV Series, 1 episode (final appearance)
