= Mary Jane Croft =

American actress (1916–1999)

- Born: February 15, 1916; Muncie, Indiana, U.S.
- Died: August 24, 1999 (aged 83); Century City, California, U.S.
- Other name: Mary Jane Croft Lewis
- Occupation: Actress
- Years active: 1935–1979
- Spouses: Jack Zoller (m. 19??; div. 19??); Elliott Lewis (m. 1959; died 1990)
- Children: 1

Mary Jane Croft (February 15, 1916 – August 24, 1999) was an American actress best known for roles as Betty Ramsey on I Love Lucy, Miss Daisy Enright on the radio and television versions of Our Miss Brooks, Mary Jane Lewis on The Lucy Show and Here's Lucy, and Clara Randolph on The Adventures of Ozzie and Harriet.

== Early career ==
Described as "a stage-struck 17-year-old just out of high school", she started her career on the stage of the Muncie Civic Theatre. She quickly joined the Guild Theatre company, a new theatrical stock company in Cincinnati. From that, she went to radio station WLW. Croft said of her work at WLW, "from 1935 to 1939, I played parts with every kind of voice and accent: children, babies, old women, society belles, main street floozies – everything."

== Radio ==
Croft's initial appearance on radio was in Sherlock Holmes. She worked extensively as an actress in radio, appearing on such programs as Life with Luigi, Blondie, The Adventures of Sam Spade, Suspense, The Beulah Show, The Bill Goodwin Show, Broadway Is My Beat, On Stage, Crime Classics, Four-Star Playhouse, The Harold Peary Show, Joan Davis Time, The Mel Blanc Show, One Man's Family, Our Miss Brooks, and Sears Radio Theater. She also appeared in frequent guest-star roles on Lucille Ball's My Favorite Husband, the beginning of their later professional and personal relationship.

Croft and Hal March co-starred in Too Many Cooks, a summer replacement program on CBS in 1950. The comedy centered on Douglas and Carrie Cook and their 10 children.

== Television ==
In addition to her work with Lucille Ball, she was a frequent guest star on other television programs, including Howard Duff's adventure/drama series Dante in the 1960 episode "The Misfortune Cookie".

She was a regular on at least two other series, as Clara Randolph the ebullient neighbor with the shrill voice married to Joe Randolph played by Hollywood veteran Lyle Talbot on The Adventures of Ozzie and Harriet, and on Our Miss Brooks on CBS, in which she reprised her radio role as Miss Daisy Enright, the title character's rival. She provided the voice for Cleo the Basset Hound in Jackie Cooper's NBC series The People’s Choice (1955–58).

Late in the weekly run of the original I Love Lucy series, the major characters moved to Connecticut. There, Lucy Ricardo befriended a new neighbor, Betty Ramsey (portrayed by Croft), who was very socially conscious and tended to get Lucy involved in adventures different from those that involved Ethel Mertz (Vivian Vance). Croft had previously guest-starred as Lucy's wealthy schoolmate Cynthia Harcourt in "Lucy is Envious", then as Evelyn Bigsby, the airline passenger seated next to Lucy in "Return Home from Europe", the episode in which Lucy disguises a hunk of cheese as a baby.

When Vance left The Lucy Show after the 1964–1965 season, Croft became Lucy's new sidekick, Mary Jane Lewis. Croft had previously had a recurring role as Audrey Simmons during the show's early seasons set in Danfield, New York. Mary Jane Lewis was Croft's legal name at the time, as she was then married to actor-producer Elliott Lewis (who had originally produced The Lucy Show during its first two seasons), but continued to use her maiden name professionally. Her only son, by a prior marriage, was killed in the Vietnam War during the period that she was co-starring with Ball.

The Lewis character was maintained when The Lucy Show was transformed into Ball's third sitcom, Here's Lucy. The character remained until Ball decided to end Here's Lucy in 1974.

Croft made an unsold pilot, The Two of Us, that centered on a children's books illustrator. The pilot was produced by Desilu.

== Later years and death ==
Croft continued to act in television for several years after the end of Here's Lucy, even reuniting with Ball in 1977 in the special Lucy Calls the President. She also returned to radio for several episodes of Sears Radio Theater in 1979.

She died of natural causes in Century City, California.

== Personal life ==
Croft married actor Jack Zoller, but they divorced after a short time. She married Elliott Lewis in 1959 and remained wed until his death in 1990. Croft had a son, Eric, by her first marriage, who was killed in action in 1967 during the Vietnam War.

== Filmography ==
Film
| Year | Film | Role | Notes |
|---|---|---|---|
| 1943 | In Old Oklahoma | Dance-hall girl | Uncredited |
| 1958 | Kathy O' | Harriet Burton/Aunt Harriet | |
Radio
| Year | Title | Role | Notes |
| 1945–1954 | Beulah | Alice Henderson | |
| 1946–1947 | The Mel Blanc Show | Betty Colby | |
| 1948–1957 | Our Miss Brooks | Daisy Enright | |
| 1953 | On Stage | Mrs. Bill Bailey | "String Bow Tie" |
| 1953–1954 | Crime Classics | Bathsheba Spooner, Elizabeth, Josie Mansfield, Marie, Marquise de Brinvilliers | "The Crime of Bathsheba Spooner", "The Axe and the Droot Family - How They Fared", "The Checkered Life and Sudden Death of Colonel James Fisk Jr.", "The Lethal Habit of the Marquise de Brinvilliers" |
| 1954 | Escape | Narrator | "The Price of the Head" |
| 1979 | Sears Radio Theater | Elizabeth | "The Choosing" |
Television
| Year | Title | Role | Notes |
| 1952 | I Married Joan | Helen | Unknown episodes |
| 1953–1955 | Our Miss Brooks | Miss Daisy Enright | 4 episodes |
| 1954–1957 | I Love Lucy | Cynthia Harcourt, Betty Ramsey, Evelyn Bigsby | 7 episodes |
| 1955–1958 | The People's Choice | Cleo the Basset Hound (voice) | all episodes |
| 1956 | Dragnet | | 2 episodes |
| 1956–1966 | The Adventures of Ozzie & Harriet | Clara Randolph | 75 episodes |
| 1957 | The Eve Arden Show | Secretary | 1 episode, "Housework" |
| 1958 | The Court of Last Resort | Mrs. Craig | 1 episode |
| 1960 | Dante | Alma Jenks | 1 episode |
| 1962–1968 | The Lucy Show | Audrey Simmons (1962–64); Mary Jane Lewis (1965–68) | 8 episodes (1962–64); 31 episodes (1965–68) |
| 1966 | Vacation Playhouse | Helen | 1 episode |
| 1966 | The Two of Us | Helen | Television pilot |
| 1969 | The Mothers-in-Law | Carol Yates | 1 episode |
| 1969–1974 | Here's Lucy | Mary Jane Lewis | 30 episodes |
| 1977 | Lucy Calls the President | Midge Bowser | Television special |
| 1981 | An Ozzie and Harriet Christmas | Self | TV special on KTLA in Los Angeles |
