= Sears Radio Theater =

US radio program

Clockwise from top: Mutual Radio Theater hosts, Lorne Greene, Vincent Price, Leonard Nimoy, Andy Griffith, Cicely Tyson.

Sears Radio Theater was a radio drama anthology series which ran weeknights on CBS Radio in 1979, sponsored by the Sears chain. Often paired with The CBS Radio Mystery Theater during its first season, the program offered a different genre of drama for each evening's broadcast.

In January 1980, the program moved from CBS to the Mutual Broadcasting System and was renamed Mutual Radio Theater. The Mutual series broadcast repeats from the CBS run until September 1980, when a short season of new dramas was presented. Sears continued as a sponsor during the Mutual run. The program turned out to be Mutual's final radio drama series. Mutual continued to broadcast repeats of the program (along with a few previously unaired episodes) until December 1980.

Monday was "Western Night" and was hosted by Lorne Greene. Tuesday was "Comedy Night", hosted by Andy Griffith. Wednesday was "Mystery Night" with Vincent Price as host. On Thursday, Cicely Tyson was host of "Love and Hate Night" and Friday brought "Adventure Night", first hosted by Richard Widmark, followed by Howard Duff and finally by Leonard Nimoy.

Several actors from the Golden Age of Radio were featured on the series. Among the actors heard were Jim Jordan, Henry Morgan, Daws Butler, June Foray, Parley Baer, Mary Jane Croft, Howard Culver, John Dehner, Joan McCall, Don Diamond, Virginia Gregg, Janet Waldo, Vic Perrin, Hans Conried, Marvin Miller, Elliott Lewis, Jeff Corey, Lesley Woods, Robert Rockwell, Lurene Tuttle, Eve Arden, Keith Andes, Harriet Nelson, Alan Young, Tom Bosley, Marion Ross, Lloyd Bochner, Rick Jason, Frank Campanella, Toni Tennille, Arthur Hill, Dan O'Herlihy, Jesse White and Frank Nelson. Veteran radio actress Peggy Webber was heard on 52 episodes.

The program was produced and directed by Fletcher Markle and Elliott Lewis. The theme music was composed and conducted by Nelson Riddle. The program was broadcast in stereo.

Though much less long-lived than the CBS Radio Mystery Theater or NPR's Earplay, the series was an ambitious attempt to reinvigorate radio drama.
