= Carl Brandt (composer) =

American composer (1914–1991)

- Born: Carl Edwin Brandt; August 15, 1914; Sacramento, California, U.S.
- Died: April 25, 1991 (aged 76) Studio City, California, U.S.
- Occupation(s): Composer, arranger
- Instrument(s): Clarinet, saxophone, violin
- Years active: 1934–1991

Carl Edwin Brandt (August 15, 1914 – April 25, 1991) was an American musician who was prolific as a composer and arranger for recording artists, television, and film.

== Early life ==
Born and raised in Sacramento, Brandt played clarinet, violin, and saxophone with The Dick Jurgens Orchestra before joining the United States Air Force during World War II.

== Career ==
After the war, he moved to Los Angeles and began composing and arranging music for television, film, and recording artists. Brandt scored music for I Spy, The Danny Thomas Show, The Mod Squad, and Eight is Enough. Of his many positions in Los Angeles, Brandt was a staff composer and arranger for Warner Bros.Brandt also scored music for animation.1958 working for UPA scoring Mister Magoo, and his first MGM short was the Chuck Jones directed Tom and Jerry "Puss and Boats" in 1966.
