= Don Voegeli =

American composer

Don Voegeli (1920-2009) was an American composer who created the theme music for the NPR radio news program All Things Considered. He attended the University of Wisconsin, during which time he volunteered at radio station WHA. In the 1940s, Voegeli led a big band, and went on to become a professor of music at the University of Wisconsin. He was also the music director for WHA from 1943 to 1964. From 1964 to 1967, Voegeli was WHA's Operations and Facilities Manager. In 1971, Voegeli created the theme for All Things Considered, which was updated in 1976 with another version also composed by Voegeli. The theme was composed on an EMS VCS 3 synthesizer. The project that resulted in the theme was funded by the Corporation for Public Broadcasting as part of the National Center for Audio Experimentation. Voegeli's son, Tom Voegeli, is an audio producer, and has worked on radio programs including WHA's Earplay and the radio dramatization of the Star Wars series.
