= David Friedkin =

American writer and director (1912–1976)

- Born: March 8, 1912; Kansas City, Missouri, U.S.
- Died: October 15, 1976 (aged 64); Los Angeles, California, U.S.
- Education: Juilliard School

Military service
- Allegiance: United States
- Branch/service: United States Army
- Unit: Signal Corps
- Battles/wars: World War II

David Friedkin (March 8, 1912 – October 15, 1976) was an American writer and director of radio shows, film, and television shows.

== Early life and education ==
Friedkin was born on March 8, 1912, in Kansas City, Missouri to Russian Jewish immigrants. His father wanted him to become a doctor. When Friedkin graduated from high school at 15, he attended the Juilliard School on a violin scholarship. At 17, Friedkin decided to become a stage actor. According to his son Anthony Friedkin, he was in the running for the lead role in the film adaptation of Golden Boy. He then focused on writing and directing. He served in the U.S. Army Signal Corps during World War II.

== Career ==
Early in his writing career, Friedkin teamed with Morton Fine; the two would frequently collaborate for radio, television, and film for the rest of Friedkin's working life. Friedkin and Fine worked on Elliott Lewis' shows Broadway Is My Beat, Crime Classics, the radio show The Line-Up, and On Stage. The two also wrote for Bold Venture, Escape, and other programs. Friedkin and Fine wrote the audition show for Gunsmoke and came up with the name "Matt Dillon". He served as president of the radio division of the Writers Guild of America West.

Friedkin directed the B-movies Hot Summer Night (1957), which was filmed in nine days, setting a speed record for MGM, and Handle with Care (1958). His and Fine's screenplay for Sidney Lumet's The Pawnbroker (1964), lauded by critics, earned them a Writers Guild of America Award.

His television work includes directing and writing episodes of Sea Hunt, Dr. Kildare, The Virginian, I Spy, Bearcats, and the unsold pilot River of Gold (1971).

Friedkin was nominated for six Emmy Awards—for Kojak, I Spy (four times), and Frontier.

== Personal life ==
Friedkin married Audrey Westphal, an actress and former dancer, on March 31, 1945. They had two sons: Gregory Enton Friedkin, an actor, and Anthony Friedkin, a photographer.

Friedkin died on October 15, 1976.
