= The Right Hand of the Devil =

1963 American film by Aram Katcher

- Theatrical release poster
- Directed by: Aram Katcher
- Written by: Ralph Brooke
- Produced by: Aram Katcher
- Cinematography: Fouad Said
- Edited by: Aram Katcher
- Release date: 1963
- Running time: 72 minutes
- Country: United Kingdom
- Language: English

The Right Hand of the Devil is a 1963 American black-and-white independent crime film directed and produced by Aram Katcher and starring Katcher, Lisa McDonald and Brad Trumbull. It was written by Ralph Brooke.

== Plot ==
Sleazy gangster Pepe Lusara arrives in Los Angeles and occupies a deserted mansion in Laurel Canyon. Planning to rob the Hollywood Sports Arena, he hires a gang of local criminals and persuades Miss Sutherland, the arena's lonely, middle-aged cashier, to help with the heist. The robbery is successful, and then Lusara kills his henchmen, dissolving their bodies in acid. He flees to Rio de Janeiro, safe in the knowledge that he has eliminated anyone who could incriminate him. Later, when he has run out of cash and returns to Hollywood for a new robbery, Miss Sutherland traps and murders him.

== Cast ==
- Aram Katcher as Pepe Lusara
- Lisa McDonald as Miss Sutherland
- Brad Trumbull as Williams
- James V. Christy as Sammy
- Chris Randall as Spooky
- Monte Lee as Carter
- Luigi Gardneri as Dino's bartender
- Georgia Holden as the dancer
- Jack Elton as Dino's pianist, uncredited

== Release ==
The film premiered in Denver, Colorado on 31 July 1963.

In Britain it was refused a certificate by the British Board of Film Censors, whose secretary John Trevelyan called it "a nasty film which is thoroughly sadistic without any justification."

== Reception ==
Variety wrote: "Right Hand of the Devil, with the germ of another Killing evident in its basic tale, gets lost on most counts – distortion of original concept, weak attempts at artiness, limited budget, uncertain acting by a largely inept cast, but, most of all, by the domination throughout of one person. The result is a short film that seems too long and is certain for slotting in the lesser half of the exploitation houses and drive-ins."

Boxoffice wrote: "While the picture is hampered by a weak script and uncertain acting, the virtually one-man production with Aram Katcher credited as star, producer, director and creator of the original story has many elements of suspense. Its brief 72-minute running time also is a plus factor. Most outstanding facet of the production is the excellent black and white photography by Fouad Said, which centers, either in fact or by implication, on many of Hollywood's famous night spots, such as Dino's."
