= Cathy Lewis =

American actress (1916–1968)

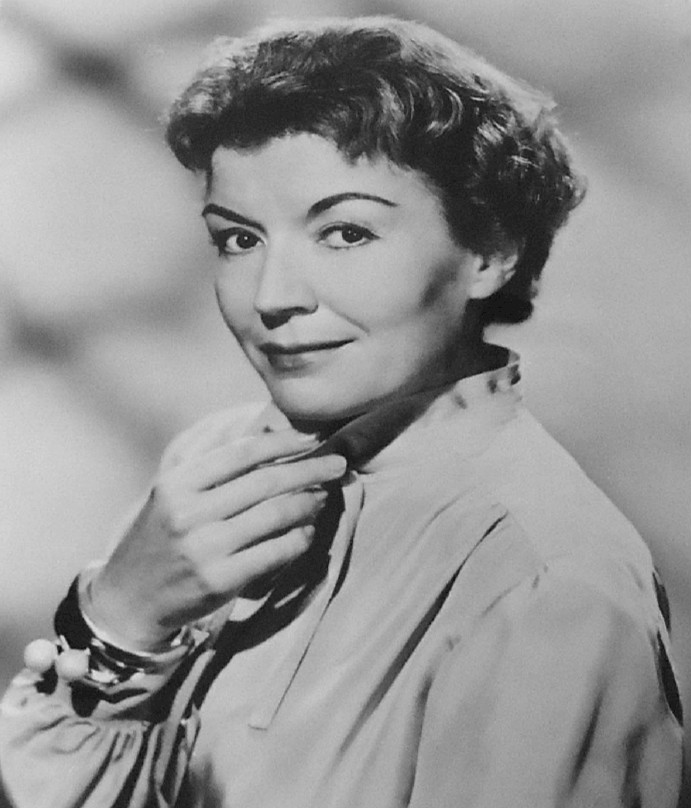
- Cathy Lewis in 1959
- Born: Catherine Lee Lewis; December 27, 1916; Spokane, Washington, U.S.
- Died: November 20, 1968 (aged 51); Los Angeles, California, U.S.
- Occupation: Actress
- Years active: 1940–1966
- Spouse: Elliott Lewis (m. 1943; div. 1958)

Catherine Lee Lewis (December 27, 1916 – November 20, 1968) was an American actress on radio, film, and television. She is remembered best for numerous radio appearances but also noted for making a number of film and television appearances in the last decade of her life.

== Career ==
According to Ron Lackmann's The Encyclopedia of American Radio, Lewis moved from Spokane, Washington to Chicago and found work on The First Nighter Program. Other accounts say she first hoped to make it as a singer. Eventually, Lewis moved to Hollywood, and performed at Pasadena Playhouse.

=== Radio ===
She would be most identified as the sensibly droll secretary Jane Stacy rooming with scatterbrained Irma Peterson (Marie Wilson) in the 1947–54 radio and television comedy My Friend Irma. In recognition of her work as Jane Stacy, she received the Ideal Secretary Award from the Executive Secretaries Club in 1948. She would play Jane Stacy until 1953, taking some time off from September 1948 and through the rest of the season due to overwork.

She appeared on Sam Spade and I Love a Mystery.

She worked with and publicly assessed the radio performances of some of the greatest screen talents of the day, including Cary Grant Gregory Peck, Joan Crawford, Joseph Cotten, June Havoc, and Humphrey Bogart.

==== Partnership with Elliott Lewis ====
Lewis met actor Elliott Lewis (who had the same surname) when they recorded at The Woodbury Playhouse on November 6, 1940. On April 30, 1943, while Elliott was on leave from the Army, they married at Chapman Park Hotel in Los Angeles. Elliott's uncle Eddie Raiden was best man. Together, the couple worked on such old time radio classics as Voyage of the Scarlet Queen and Suspense. They earned a combined income of $90,000 per year.

Both Lewises were staples of vintage American radio in numerous, genre-spanning works in comedy and drama (they were, for example, regulars among what was known as Hollywood's Radio Row group of performers, appearing often—together and separately—on such programs as The Whistler), especially their co-creation of the anthology series On Stage.

Together they wrote an episode of Suspense titled "The Thirteenth Sound" that aired in 1947 and an episode of Twelve Players titled "Checkerboard" that aired in 1948.

The Lewises separated on their fourteenth anniversary, and Cathy filed for divorce, on the grounds of mental cruelty. The divorce was granted on April 16, 1958.

=== Films and television ===
Most of her film work in the 1940s was in uncredited bit parts. She recreated her My Friend Irma role on television for the show's first two seasons, but, overworked and tired of the role, left the show in 1953.

She had a supporting role in The Party Crashers (1958). That same year, she and Elliott Lewis divorced, putting an end to their image as "Mr. and Mrs. Radio." A year later, she starred as half the title of a short-lived bid to bring another radio show, Fibber McGee and Molly, to television, with Bob Sweeney as Fibber to Lewis's Molly. The show initially had mixed reviews, but it was cancelled during its first season.

In 1961, Lewis received positive notice for her supporting role in the movie The Devil at 4 O'Clock. She began a recurring role as Deirdre Thompson, the snooty sister of George Baxter, on the television hit Hazel.

In 1962, she appeared (voice only) in the John Wayne movie Hatari!, as the radio voice of Arusha Control.

Lewis played a widow courted by two men of a mule team in the 1964 episode "Graydon's Charge" of the syndicated series Death Valley Days.

In 1965 Lewis played steamboat Captain Samantha Stewart in a Season 8 Wagon Train episode titled "The Captain Sam Story". The episode aired on March 21.

== Personal life ==
Lewis was an avid interior decorator.

She and Marie Wilson became close during the run of My Friend Irma. She called Marie "Cookie" or "Cook" for short.

== Death ==
Lewis died of cancer on November 20, 1968, in Hollywood aged 51.

== Filmography ==
Year	Title	Role	Notes
1940	We Who Are Young	Office Girl	Uncredited
1940	Little Nellie Kelly	Western Union Operator	Uncredited
1940	Dr. Kildare's Crisis	Flo	Uncredited
1941	Model Wife	Salesgirl	Uncredited
1941	Dr. Kildare's Wedding Day	Nurse	Uncredited
1941	Double Trouble	Peggy Whitmore	
1942	Kid Glove Killer	Bessie Wright	
1942	Wings for the Eagle	Personnel Clerk	Uncredited
1943	Slightly Dangerous	Salesgirl	Uncredited
1947	The Hucksters	Wanda Jean	Voice, Uncredited
1949	The Story of Molly X	Cy	
1958	The Party Crashers	Mrs. Nickerson	
1961	The Devil at 4 O'Clock	Matron	
1961–66	Hazel	Deirdre Thompson	17 episodes
1962	Hatari!	Radio Operator	Voice, Uncredited
1964–65	Jonny Quest	Jade & others	4 episodes
1965	Wagon Train	Captain Sam	Season 8, Episode 21

== Listen to ==
- "On a Country Road" from Suspense
- "The House In Cypress Canyon" from Suspense
- "The Murderess" from Suspense
