= Anthony Friedkin =

American photographer

- Born: 1949 (age 76–77); Los Angeles, California, U.S.
- Occupation: Photographer

Anthony Friedkin (born 1949) is an American photographer whose works have chronicled California's landscapes, cities and people. His topics include phenomena such as surf culture, prisons, cinema, and gay culture. Friedkin’s photographs have been exhibited in the Los Angeles County Museum of Art and the J. Paul Getty Museum. His photographs are included in major Museum collections: New York's Museum of Modern Art, The J. Paul Getty Museum and others. He is represented in numerous private collections as well. His pictures have been published in Japan, Russia, Europe, and many Fine Art magazines in America.

In 2014, The Gay Essay, which documents Californian gay culture during the late 1960s and early 1970s, was featured in San Francisco's deYoung Museum.

He has over forty years experience as a professional photographer. Anthony Friedkin has lived and worked out of his apartment studio in Santa Monica.

== Early life and photojournalism ==
Friedkin was born in Los Angeles, California in 1949. At age 8, he started taking photographs, and by the age of 11, he was developing photos in a darkroom.

In 1968-99, he attended Santa Monica City College as a liberal arts major. During 1969-1970, he moved on to the Art Center College of Design with a concentration in photography. During 1971-1972, he attended the University of California, Los Angeles as a photography major. In 1971, he attended the Royal College of Art as a visiting student. In 1972, he attended an Aperion Workshop in Millerton, New York.

In 1975, he started working as a still photographer for the film industry. For a time, he worked as a photojournalist working as a stringer for Magnum Photos in Los Angeles. During his career he taught photography at both UCLA and California Institute of the Arts.

== Accomplishments ==
He received a National Endowment of the Arts grant in 1977 and was given a special commendation by Los Angeles Mayor Tom Bradley for his contribution to Fine Art Photography in 1980.

== Bodies of work ==
Together his completed photo essays are: "The Gay Essay," done in San Francisco and Los Angeles in 1969 and 1970; "The Beverly Hills Essay," shot in 1975; "The Hollywood Series," which was inaugurated by a special commission in 1978 and continues to this day; and "The Ocean-Surfing Essay," which explores Friedkin’s intimate, intensely personal relationship with the sea and its magnificent waves. A historical set of photographs on "New York City Brothels," includes genuine studies of prostitutes in their work environment. A special set of pictures on "California Prisons"and their inmates, includes sensitive portraits of incarcerated teenagers. For most of his life he has been photographing "Los Angeles," creating an unparalleled body of images, which comes from his love of the diversely visual and cultural town.

Of all his major photographic series, only one documents life outside the Golden State (New York City Brothels).

=== The Hollywood Essay ===
In 1978, Friedkin began work on a series of photographs showing the behind-the-scenes realities of the cinema industry. These photographs challenge viewers to step back from the illusion of real life that Hollywood movies create, instead showing the artifice and business behind the illusion. In a 2014 interview, Friedkin indicated this work is still in progress. In 1985, a subset of costume photography from the essay was displayed at the Nicola gallery in Los Angeles. In 1986, The Hollywood Essay was featured at the Min Gallery in Tokyo, Japan.

=== California Prisons: Incarceration: Images from Folsom Prison ===
In 2004, the work was displayed at the fine art gallery of Los Angeles Harbor College. California Prisons includes sensitive portrait shots of incarcerated teenagers, as well as the many typical representations of machismo and gang affiliated men.

=== Ocean View: The Depiction of Southern California Coastal Lifestyles ===
In a series of photographs titled Ocean View: The Depiction of Southern California Coastal Lifestyles, Friedkin examined the mythology of California that has enticed people, industries, and money to the state over the past century. Many of the photographs document surf culture, showing it in the wider context of the imagery of the California Dream.

He made the twenty black-and-white photographs of his Wave Portfolio between 1977 and 2006, printing them in his own darkroom in Santa Monica. They show waves at Zuma Beach, Venice Beach, Hermosa Beach, La Jolla, Carmel, and Santa Monica.

While writing about his own connection to the ocean, Friedkin described the movement of the ocean as appearing artistic and impressive.

=== The Gay Essay ===
In 1969, when Friedkin was 19, he began to chronicle gay life in Los Angeles and San Francisco, hoping to increase its visibility and gain a better understanding of gay culture there. The photo essay was captured in the years of sexual revolution, around the time of the Stonewall riots. While taking the portraits in informal settings such as hotels and bars, he often developed close relationships with his subjects. In 2014, Friedkin released The Gay Essay, a book containing 75 portraits from the series, published by Yale University Press. The publisher announced that the book is intended to be the first of several books containing photos from the series.

Friedkin began his work on the “Gay Essay,” when he was only nineteen years of age, and set out “to depict [the] struggles, humiliations, and [the] triumphs [of queer culture]". Friedkin’s goal was to document what it meant to defy the grain when it is wrong, that is to show the courage it takes to define one’s own freedom and individuality.

“The Gay Essay” was not shown in America for a long time due to the sensitivity of the images Friedkin produced and a less than receptive society whose mainstream was overwhelmingly homophobic, simply put, but was exhibited in Europe and East Asia and was received well.

From June 2014 to January 2015, San Francisco's DeYoung Museum exhibited the 75 prints to coincide with the 45th anniversary of the Stonewall riots. The exhibit also included materials from the artist's archive that convey the historical context of the work.

== Exhibitions (selection) ==
=== Solo exhibitions ===
Some of his solo exhibitions are listed below:

- 2003: Timekeeper, a 30 Year Retrospective, Cohen Gallery, Los Angeles
- 2011: The Surfing Essay, Drkrm Gallery, Los Angeles
- 2011: TIMEKEEPER, Gallery 478, San Pedro
- 2014: The Gay Essay, de Young Fine Art Museum, San Francisco
- 2016: The Wave Portfolio: Photographs by Anthony Friedkin, Laguna Art Museum, Laguna Beach
- 2016: Chronographs, Leica Gallery, Los Angeles
- 2017: Timekeeper, Christophe Guye Galerie, Zurich
- 2017: The Gay Essay, Daniel Cooney Fine Art, New York

=== Group exhibitions ===
Some of his group exhibitions are listed below:

- 2003: Surf Culture, The Art History of Surfing, Laguna Art Museum, Laguna Beach (catalogue ISBN 1584231130)
- 2005: Inaugural Exhibition, Amador Gallery, New York
- 2007: The Seventies Revisited, dnj gallery, Los Angeles
- 2008: Love me, DRKRM Gallery, Los Angeles
- 2010: Inaugural Exhibition, Christophe Guye Galerie, Zurich
- 2011: Yea Big: small works, Cohen Gallery, Los Angeles
- 2011: In Focus: Los Angeles, 1945-1980, Getty Center, Los Angeles
- 2012: Backyard Oasis: The Swimming Pool in Southern California Photography, 1945-1982, Palm Springs Art Museum, Palm Springs
- 2012: Camera Night at the Ivar, DRKRM Gallery, Los Angeles
- 2014: Road Trip: Photography of the American West, Musée des Beaux-Arts de Bordeaux, Bordeaux
- 2015: Drawn to Light, Joseph Bellows Gallery, La Jolla
- 2016: Gallery Selections, Joseph Bellows Gallery, La Jolla
