= Crime Classics =

American radio docudrama series (1953–1954)

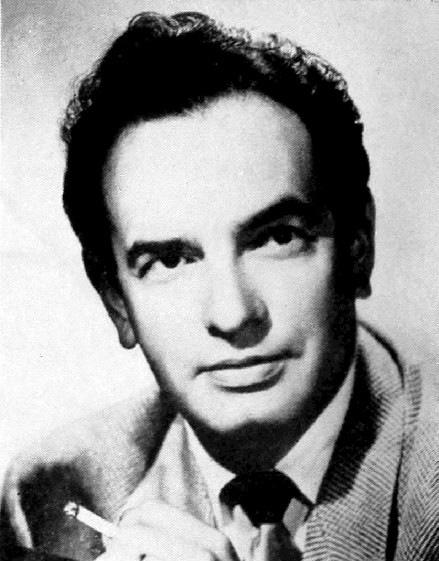
- Elliott Lewis, creator, producer, and director of Crime Classics
- Genre: Historical crime drama
- Running time: 30 minutes
- Country of origin: United States
- Language: English
- Syndicates: CBS
- Starring: Lou Merrill
- Announcer: Bob LeMond; Roy Rowan; Larry Thor
- Created by: Elliott Lewis
- Written by: Morton Fine; David Friedkin
- Directed by: Elliott Lewis
- Produced by: Elliott Lewis
- Original release: June 15, 1953 – June 30, 1954

Crime Classics is a United States radio docudrama which aired as a sustaining series over CBS Radio from June 15, 1953, to June 30, 1954.

== Production ==
Produced and directed by radio actor and director Elliott Lewis, the program was a historical true crime series, examining crimes and murders from the past. It grew out of Lewis' personal interest in famous murder cases and took a documentary-like approach to the subject, carefully recreating the facts, personages and feel of the time period. Comparatively little dramatic license was taken with the facts and events, but the tragedy was leavened with humor, expressed largely through the narration.

The crimes dramatized covered a broad range of times and places, from ancient Greece to late 19th-century America. Each episode in the series was co-written by Morton Fine and David Friedkin, in consultation with Lewis, although the scripting process was more a matter of research, as the stories were from "the records of newspapers of every land from every time."

The cases ranged from famous assassinations (of Abraham Lincoln, Leon Trotsky, and Julius Caesar) and the lives (and often deaths) of the likes of Cesare Borgia and Blackbeard to more obscure cases, such as Bathsheba Spooner, who killed her husband Joshua Spooner in 1778 and became the first woman tried and executed in America.

The only continuing character was the host and narrator, Thomas Hyland, played by Lou Merrill. Hyland was introduced by the announcer as a "connoisseur of crime, student of violence, and teller of murders." Merrill's deadpan portrayal of Hyland provided the welcome note of tongue-in-cheek humor to the proceedings. Unlike the ghoulish weird storytellers of The Whistler and The Mysterious Traveler, Hyland was an ordinary fellow who, in a dry, droll manner, would present a tale from his files, his wry comments interspersed between dramatized scenes. The episodes would typically begin with Hyland inviting the audience to listen to a sound, from drops of rain to horses' hooves, and then introducing the main players and events of his report. The titles also contributed to the series' light tone, as they were intentionally pompous and usually laced with irony. Typical titles included "Your Loving Son, Nero," "If a Body Needs a Body, Just Call Burke and Hare," and "The Axe and the Droot Family... How They Fared".

A roster of Hollywood radio actors filled the various historical roles. William Conrad was one of the more frequently heard performers, in such diverse parts as Nero, Blackbeard, Pat Garrett and King Arthur. Other performers, and the villains and victims they portrayed, included Jack Kruschen (as William Burke and Trotsky assassin Ramón Mercader), Jay Novello (as William Hare and Dr. William Palmer), Mary Jane Croft (as Bathsheba Spooner and Madame de Brinvilliers), Betty Lou Gerson (as Agrippina and Lucrezia Borgia), Edgar Barrier (as Julius Caesar), Harry Bartell (as Brutus), Hans Conried (as Ali Pasha), Herb Butterfield (as Lincoln, Trotsky, and Thomas Edwin Bartlett), Jack Edwards (as John Wilkes Booth and Cole Younger), Irene Tedrow (as Lizzie Borden), William Johnstone (as Robert Knox), Betty Harford (as Madeleine Smith and Ripper victim Mary Jane Kelly), Eve McVeagh (as Madame Marie Lafarge), Clayton Post (as Jesse James), and Sam Edwards (as Billy the Kid and Bob Younger). Georgia Ellis and Tudor Owen also were heard regularly on the program.

Composer Bernard Herrmann returned to radio to score all but one of the series episodes (with Wilbur Hatch substituting for that entry), capturing the sound and feel of the various time periods simply but elegantly, often with the use of only two or three instruments per episode. During the fall of 1953, the show was scheduled back to back with On Stage, another dramatic anthology created by Lewis. He decided to connect the two by presenting "The Assassination of Abraham Lincoln" on Crime Classics while On Stage featured Our American Cousin, the play Lincoln had attended the night of his death. The experiment was unsuccessful, and according to radio historian John Dunning, earned Lewis a rebuke from network head William S. Paley, who advised him to never attempt anything like it again.

Episodes included "Good Evening, My Name Is Jack the Ripper" on June 30, 1954, with Betty Hartford portraying Mary Jane Kelly.

Roy Rowan, Larry Thor, and Bob Lemond were the announcers. Ken McManus was the director.

The trade publication Billboard reported in 1956 that Tomado Productions would begin filming Crime Classics for television. Merrill was to continue as host, with Lewis as executive producer and Robert Florey as director. The episode was not broadcast.
