= Fouad Said =

Egyptian film producer

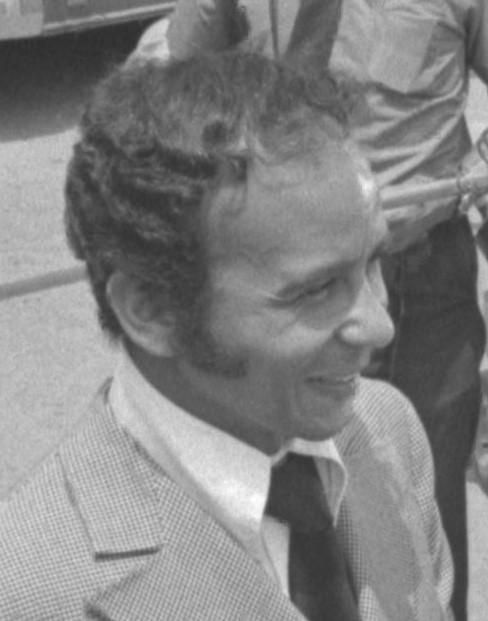
- Said in 1970
- Born: 1933 (age 92–93)
- Citizenship: Egypt
- Education: USC School of Cinematic Arts, University of Southern California
- Occupations: Film producer, cinematographer, filmmaker

Fouad Said (Arabic: فؤاد سعيد; born 1933) is an Egyptian-American producer, cinematographer and filmmaker.

== Early life and education ==
Said graduated from USC School of Cinematic Arts. He received his master's degree from University of Southern California in 1973. He completed his thesis on the diversification of the Cinemobile Systems company from equipment truck production to film production.

== Career ==
He is best known for inventing Cinemobile, integrated mobile movie studio trucks, which was developed on the set of the TV series I Spy and proved influential in Hollywood. Said conceived of the precursor to the Cinemobile while working for producer Sheldon Leonard in Hong Kong. He converted a Ford econoline panel truck so that it would load onto cargo planes and filled it with all the necessary equipments, such as cameras and generators. He later earned a Scientific and Engineering Award from the Academy of Motion Picture Arts and Sciences in 1969 "for the design and introduction of the Cinemobile series of equipment trucks for location motion picture production".

"using one of the last Cinemobile production vans in which all camera, lighting, and grip equipment was compartmentalized on a single vehicle, with an on-board generator...one Brute arc...my only 'big gun' for night exteriors, along with a couple of Maxi-brutes and four big-eye 10ks...In fact, it is amazing what you can accomplish with very little." - Thomas E. Ackerman, Director of Photography, New Year's Evil (1980)

== Studio ==
Said built a development studio with $10 million in outside investment. Taft Broadcasting later became the parent company of the studio, with United Artists Theatre Group and Hemdale Film Corporation as investors.

== Select credits ==
- Virgin Sacrifice (1959) – associate producer, cinematographer
- The Right Hand of the Devil (1963) – cinematographer
- 3 Nuts in Search of a Bolt (1964) – cinematographer
- I Spy (1965–68) – location cinematographer
- Hickey & Boggs (1972) – producer
- Across 110th Street (1972) – producer
- The Deadly Trackers (1973) – producer
- Aloha Bobby and Rose (1975) – producer
