= Morton Fine =

American screenwriter (1916–1991)

- Born: December 24, 1916; Baltimore, Maryland
- Died: March 7, 1991 (aged 74)
- Education: St. John's College; University of Pittsburgh
- Occupation: Screenwriter
- Known for: I Spy, The Pawnbroker

Morton Fine (December 24, 1916 – March 7, 1991) was an American screenwriter.

A native of Baltimore, Maryland, Fine worked in an advertising agency, a bookstore, and an aircraft factory before joining the U.S. Army Air Forces in 1942 during World War II. A graduate of St. John's College in Annapolis, Fine returned to school after his military service ended in 1944 and earned a master's degree in English from the University of Pittsburgh. After an unprofitable stint writing for magazines, he moved to California and turned to writing for radio programs. It was then that he met David Friedkin and began a long writing partnership. Fine wrote several nationally broadcast radio shows in collaboration with David Friedkin, including Broadway Is My Beat and Crime Classics.

The writing duo then moved on to film and television where their credits include The Pawnbroker (for which he won the Writers Guild of America Award for Best Written American Drama in 1965), The Nativity, The Greek Tycoon, I Spy, The Next Man, The Most Deadly Game, and several television Westerns including The Rifleman, The Big Valley, Maverick, The Virginian and more.
