= Ramsay Hill =

British actor (1889–1976)

- Born: Cyril Seys Ramsay-Hill; 30 November 1889; Georgetown, British Guiana
- Died: 3 February 1976 (aged 86); Van Nuys, Los Angeles, California, U.S.
- Resting place: Valhalla Memorial Park
- Occupations: Actor, technical advisor
- Years active: 1928–1961

Ramsay Hill (born Cyril Seys Ramsay-Hill; 30 November 1889 – 3 February 1976) was a British radio and film actor, and a former British and Egyptian army officer, whose military experience and multilingual proficiency helped make him a much-in-demand technical advisor and dialogue coach in Hollywood.

== Early life and career ==
Born in Georgetown, British Guiana, Ramsay Hill was the child of John Ramsay-Hill and Rosalie Vansolsman. He obtained a degree in Chemistry from Brighton Technical School in 1909, and served with the Royal Buckinghamshire Hussars in World War I.

Speaking more than two decades after his death, actor Parley Baer—who had appeared with Ramsay Hill at least once on one of the most popular old-time radio anthology series—recalled that his late colleague was "a good actor who put a lot of imagination into the parts he was given." Regarding his performance as John, Prince of England in Cecil B. DeMille's The Crusades, Pittsburgh Sun Telegraph critic George Seibel wrote that, amidst the film's many romantic episodes and spectacular combat sequences, the "best acting of the spectacle" is done by Ramsay Hill and Joseph Schildkraut—as the Marquis of Montferrat—while playing a game of chess.

In contrast to his film career, consisting primarily of small, often uncredited roles overshadowed by his crucial and relatively well-publicized contributions as a technical consultant, Ramsay-Hill had a lengthy radio acting career including many substantial roles, some of the most notable being Roderick Usher (from Poe's "The Fall of the House of Usher"), Godfrey Ablewhite (in Wilkie Collins's The Moonstone), Merlin in Mark Twain's A Connecticut Yankee in King Arthur's Court, and the title character in the NBC University Theatre production of Eric Knight's short story "The Old General."

== Personal life and death ==
Ramsay-Hill became a naturalized United States citizen on 23 May 1952, at the age of 62. He was married at least four times, the second being to Edith Mary Agnes Hughes (née Maude), beginning on 22 November 1924, and continuing until their divorce on 18 Jun 1928. The third marriage, commencing on 17 December 1930, was to Patsey Morris (daughter of writer Gouverneur Morris), with whom Ramsay-Hill had one son, John, and to whom he remained married at least until February 1949, at which time it was reported that the couple resided on Foothill Boulevard in Pasadena. The younger Ramsay-Hill had a brief career as a child actor on radio before committing suicide in 1957 at age 19, reportedly due to a failed love affair. By that point, Ramsay-Hill and Morris had evidently divorced, as the Los Angeles Mirror lists the deceased's parents as Cyril Ramsay-Hill and Patsy Splane.

On 3 February 1976, having fallen seriously ill more than two months prior, Ramsay-Hill died of undisclosed causes at the Valley Presbyterian Hospital in Van Nuys, survived by his wife Polly Ramsay-Hill. His remains are interred at Valhalla Memorial Park in North Hollywood.

== Radio ==
Date(s)	Program	Role	Notes
20 September 1937	Lux Radio Theatre; Ep. "The Outsider"	NA	
5 October 1944	Suspense; Ep. "Dateline Lisbon"	Judge	
12 October 1944	Suspense; Ep. "The Merry Widower"	Doctor	
28 January 1945	The Pacific Story; Ep. "The Andaman Islands"	NA	
25 June 1945	Cavalcade of America; Ep. "DDT"	NA	
27 August 1945	Lux Radio Theatre; Ep. "Practically Yours"	NA	
19 November 1945	Lux Radio Theatre; Ep. "Keys of the Kingdom"	NA	
18 February 1946	Cavalcade of America; Ep. "Young Major Washington"	NA	
11 March 1946	Cavalcade of America; Ep. "The Doctor With Hope in His Hands"	NA	
2 September 1946	Cavalcade of America; Ep. "With Cradle and Clock"	NA	
21 October 1946	Cavalcade of America; Ep. "Mr. Conyngham Sweeps the Seas"	NA	
3 December 1946	Favorite Story; Ep. "Wuthering Heights"	NA	
17 February 1947	Lux Radio Theatre; Ep. "Devotion"	NA	
22 October 1947	Escape; Ep. "The Fall of the House of Usher"	Roderick Usher	
1 December 1947	Lux Radio Theatre; Ep. "The Ghost and Mrs Muir"	NA	
4 January 1948	The Ronald Colman Show; Ep. "The Phantom Rikshaw"	NA	Rudyard Kipling story, starring William Conrad and Eric Snowden
7 February 1948	Escape; Ep. "The Vanishing Lady"	Hotel manager / cab driver	Alexander Woollcott story, adapted by William N. Robson
12 March 1948	Favorite Story; Ep. "The Light That Failed"	Doctor	
3 April 1948	Suspense; Ep. "Suspicion"	Dr. Maysbury	Dorothy L. Sayers story, adapted by Irving Ravetch, starring Sam Jaffe, Lurene Tuttle
16 May 1948	Tell It Again; Ep. "A Tale of Two Cities"	NA	
25 June 1948	Favorite Story; Ep. "The Moonstone"	Godfrey Ablewhite / Bharu	Adaptation of Wilkie Collins' novel, narrated by Ronald Colman
5 July 1948	Let George Do It; Ep. "Murder Me Twice"	Jonathan Thorpe	
17 October 1948	NBC University Theatre; Ep. "The History of Mr. Polly"	Narrator	
31 October 1948	NBC University Theatre; Ep. "Justice"	NA	
21 November 1948	NBC University Theatre; Ep. "The Short Happy Life of Francis Macomber"	NA	
19 December 1948	Tell It Again; Ep. "The Prince and the Pauper"	NA	
23 January 1949	NBC University Theatre; Ep. "The Ministry of Fear"	NA	Graham Greene's novel, adapted by Ernest Kinoy
13 February 1949	NBC University Theatre; Ep. "Tom Jones"	Narrator	
24 February 1949	Suspense; Ep. "Where There's a Will"	Hopkinson	Agatha Christie story, adapted by William Fifield
27 February 1949	NBC University Theatre; Ep. "The Heart of Midlothian"	NA	
18 March 1949	NBC University Theatre; Ep. "The Pickwick Papers"	NA	
18 April 1949	Let George Do It; Ep. "The Elusive Hundred Grand"	NA	
23 April 1949	Escape; Ep. "The Great Impersonation"	NA	
24 April 1949	NBC University Theatre; Ep. "The Way of All Flesh"	NA	From Samuel Butler's novel, starring Tom Conway
9 July 1949	NBC University Theatre; Ep. "Goodbye, Mr. Chips"	Narrator	
14 July 1949	Escape; Ep. "Drums of the Fore and Aft"	Colonel	Rudyard Kipling's story, adapted by Les Crutchfield, narrated by Ben Wright as Kipling
6 August 1949	NBC University Theatre; Ep. "The Death of a Heart"	NA	
27 August 1949	NBC University Theatre; Ep. "1984"	Narrator	
3 September 1949	NBC University Theatre; Ep. "Precious Bane"	NA	
6 November 1949	NBC University Theatre; Ep. "Dodsworth"	NA	
20 November 1949	NBC University Theatre; Ep. "For Whom the Bell Tolls"	Fernando	Hemingway novel, adapted by Ernest Kinoy
1 January 1950	NBC University Theatre, ep. "Great Expectations"	NA	
10 January 1950	Escape, ep. "Vanishing Lady"	NA	
17 January 1950	Escape, ep. "The Sure Thing"	NA	
19 January 1950	Maisie, ep. "Lord Deveridge and Lady Revere"	NA	
12 March 1950	NBC University Theatre ep. "There Is No Conversation"	Etienne	
2 April 1950	NBC University Theatre, ep. "Mrs. Dalloway"	NA	Adaptation of Virginia Woolf novel
7 April 1950	Escape, ep. "The Ambassador of Poker"	NA	
30 April 1950	NBC University Theatre, ep. "Sons and Lovers"	NA	
14 May 1950	NBC University Theatre, ep. "Prater Violet"	NA	
24 May 1950	Dangerous Assignment, ep. "Burmese Witnesses"	NA	
28 May 1950	NBC University Theatre, ep. "Imperial Palace"	NA	
29 May 1950	The Adventures of Christopher London, ep. "Pattern for Murder"	NA	
16 June 1950	Escape, ep. "Serenade for a Cobra"	Brent	
6 August 1950	NBC University Theatre, ep. "A Connecticut Yankee in King Arthur's Court"	Merlin	
15 August 1950	Presenting Charles Boyer, ep. "Claude De Vol's Unfinished Rhapsody"	NA	
18 August 1950	Escape, ep. "The Footprint"	NA	
20 August 1950	NBC University Theatre, ep. "A High Wind in Jamaica"	Narrator	Richard Hughes' novel, adapted by Jane Speed, starring Anne Whitfield, Herbert Rawlinson, Dawn Bender
10 September 1950	NBC University Theatre, ep. "Lost Horizon"	Narrator	
17 September 1950	NBC University Theatre, ep. "Portrait in the Mirror"	NA	
19 November 1950	NBC University Theatre, ep. "The Baron of Grogzwig"	Narrator	From Dickens' Nicholas Nickleby
27 December 1950	NBC University Theatre, ep. "The Gambler"	Croupier	
7 January 1951	Escape; Ep. "Conquest"	NA	
11 January 1951	Screen Guild Players; Ep. "Brief Encounter"	Stephen	Starring Stewart Granger and Deborah Kerr
14 February 1951	NBC University Theatre, ep. "The Withered Arm"	Lodge	Thomas Hardy story, adapted by Ernest Kinoy
17 March 1951	The Man Called X Ep. "University of Leiden"	NA	Starring Herbert Marshall; other supporting players inc. Maria Palmer, Peggy Webber, Will Wright, and Harry Bartell
22 April 1951	Mr. and Mrs. Blandings, ep. "Lily Lamar" aka "The Old Friend"	NA	
30 April 1951	Star Playhouse, ep. "The Long Way Back"	Ashford	
3 May 1951	Screen Director's Playhouse, ep. "Captain of Castile"	The Marquis	
18 June 1951	Lux Radio Theatre, ep. "Edward, My Son"	NA	
5 August 1951	The New Theatre, ep. "Rebecca"	NA	Daphne du Maurier's novel, adapted by Earl Hamner, with Arnold Moss as Maxim de Winter
14 October 1951	The Silent Men, ep. "The Big Sneak"	NA	
5 November 1951	Suspense; Ep. "The Trials of Thomas Shaw"	Judge File	
31 December 1951	Suspense ep. "Rogue Male"	Officer	Geoffrey Household novel adapted by Silvia Richards, starring Herbert Marshall
25 January 1952	NBC Presents: Short Story; Ep. "The Hut"	Colonel Fayze	Geoffrey Household's story, adapted by Ernest Kinoy
9 May 1952	NBC Presents: Short Story; Ep. "The Old General"	The General	Hill stars as title character in Eric Knight's story, with Alma Lawton, Norma Varden, and John Dodsworth
22 September 1952	Suspense; Ep. "Jack Ketch"	Barkeeper	
12 January 1953	Suspense, ep. "The Mystery of Edwin Drood, Part II"	Mr. Datchery	
16 May 1953	Space Patrol, ep. "Secret of Sub–Level 7"	NA	
18 July 1953	Space Patrol, ep. no. 42	NA	
22 March 1955	Suspense; Ep. "The Cellar"	Mr. Forepaugh	
17 May 1955	Suspense; Ep. "Lili and the Colonel"	Colonel Julian Abernathy	Written by John Dehner, co-starring Hill and Paula Winslowe
15 November 1955	Suspense; Ep. "Once a Murderer"	Judge File	
9 October 1956	Suspense; Ep. "The Digger"	Carton	
26 October 1956	The Joseph Cotten Show: On Trial; Ep. "De Santre Affair" aka "The Fatal Charm"	Doctor	
10 February 1957	Suspense; Ep. "Door of Gold"	Dr. Clayton	
7 April 1957	Suspense; Ep. "Vanishing Lady"	Jacques the coachman / Waiter	
5 October 1958	Suspense; Ep. "The Man Who Won the War"	Ainsley / Lieutenant	Robert Buckner story adapted by William N. Robson, starring Herbert Marshall
22 February 1959	Suspense; Ep. "Star Over Hong Kong"	Captain	

== Film and television ==
=== Acting ===
Year	Title	Role	Notes
1928	Moderne Piraten	James Morton, Marine-Offizier	as Cyril de Ramsay
1931	Dishonored	Grinning Officer	Uncredited
1932	Crooner	Nightclub Patron	Uncredited
1932	Washington Merry-Go-Round	Hotel Desk Clerk	Uncredited
1934	Riptide	Sir Geoffrey Mapel	Uncredited
1934	The World Moves On	British Officer	Uncredited
1934	Down to Their Last Yacht	Geoffrey Colt-Stratton, Jr.	Uncredited
1934	We Live Again	Dancing Russian Officer	Uncredited
1935	L'Homme des Folies Bergère	Christian de Guntherson	
1935	Mad Love	Actor as 'Duke'	Uncredited
1935	The Crusades	John - Prince of England	
1935	The Last Outpost	Captain	Uncredited
1935	The Man Who Broke the Bank at Monte Carlo	Usher	Uncredited
1935	A Tale of Two Cities	Aristocrat	Uncredited
1936	Everybody's Old Man	Earl of Spearford	
1936	House of Secrets	Police Inspector	Uncredited
1937	Espionage	Kronsky Aide	Uncredited
1937	Old Louisiana	James Madison	
1937	Café Metropole	Gambler	Uncredited
1937	Parnell	House of Commons Member	Uncredited
1937	The Emperor's Candlesticks	Conspirator	Uncredited
1937	The Firefly	French Officer	Uncredited
1937	Conquest	Bertrand	Uncredited
1937	Live, Love and Learn	First Gallery Salesman	Uncredited
1937	Charlie Chan at Monte Carlo	Casino Patron	Uncredited
1938	Lord Jeff	Jewelry Clerk	Uncredited
1938	Marie Antoinette	Major Domo	Uncredited
1947	The Exile	Cavalier Officer	as C.S. Ramsey-Hill
1947	Forever Amber	Major-Domo	Uncredited
1947	If Winter Comes	Chemin-de-Fer Player	Uncredited
1948	Letter from an Unknown Woman	Colonel Steindorf	Uncredited
1949	The Fighting O'Flynn	British Officer	Uncredited
1949	Oboler Comedy Theater (TV); Ep. "Love, Love, Love"	Air Officer	
1951	The Prince Who Was a Thief	Hedjah	Uncredited
1951	When Worlds Collide	French U.N. Representative	Uncredited
1951	The Last Half Hour: The Mayerling Story (TV movie)	Minister of State	
1952	The Unexpected (TV); Ep. "The Perfect Mrs. Clesney"	Partner	as Ramsey Hill
1952	Caribbean	Townsend	
1952	The Iron Mistress	Malot	Uncredited
1952	Bwana Devil	Major Parkhurst	
1952	Battles of Chief Pontiac	Gen. Sir Jeffrey Amherst	as Ramsey Hill
1953	Rogue's March	British Colonel	Uncredited
1953	Space Patrol (TV); Ep. "The Stolen Evidence"	Governor Marin	
1953	The Golden Blade	Beggar	Uncredited
1953	King of the Khyber Rifles	Cavalry Officer	Uncredited
1954	Trader Tom of the China Seas	British Colonel	as Ramsey Hill
1954	The Black Shield of Falworth	Sir Charles	Uncredited
1954	Bengal Brigade	Maj. Jennings	Uncredited
1955	Panther Girl of the Kongo	Stanton	
1955	The Whistler; Ep. "Borrowed Byline"	NA	
1955	East of Eden	English officer	Uncredited
1955	Damon Runyon Theater; Ep. "A Light in France"	NA	
1955	The King's Thief	Lord	Uncredited
1955	Screen Director's Playhouse; Ep. "The Titanic Incident"	Mr. Ogden	
1956	I Love Lucy (TV); Ep. "Paris at Last"	Police Sgt.	
1956	Telephone Time (TV); Ep. "The Man Who Believed in Fairy Tales"	NA	
1956	The Ten Commandments	Korah	
1956	The Adventures of Jim Bowie (TV); Ep. "The Return of the Alcibiade"	Jean Baptiste Plachel	
1957	The Gale Storm Show: Oh! Susanna	Martine	
1960	Midnight Lace	Blind Man	Uncredited
1961	One Hundred and One Dalmatians	Television Announcer, Labrador (voice)	
1961	Susan Slade	John Brecker	Uncredited
1964	The Unsinkable Molly Brown	Lord Simon Pimdale	Uncredited

=== Additional crew ===
Year	Title	Job	Notes
1938	Suez	technical advisor	Aside from maintaining regional and period authenticity, advice in this instance included teaching supporting actor J. Edward Bromberg Arabic for his role as Prince Said.
1939	The Sun Never Sets	technical advisor	as Major C.S. Ramsay-Hill
1940	Swiss Family Robinson	technical advisor	as Major C.S. Ramsay-Hill
1942	Cairo	technical advisor	as Major C. S. Ramsay-Hill
1943	Assignment in Brittany	technical advisor for commando sequence	as Major Ramsey-Hill
1943	Forever and a Day	technical advisor	Uncredited
1943	Madame Curie	technical director	Uncredited
1944	The White Cliffs of Dover	technical advisor	as Major Cyrl Seys Ramsay-Hill [sic]
1946	Temptation	technical direction	as C.S. Ramsay-Hill
1947	Lured	technical advisor	Uncredited
1951	The Prince Who Was a Thief	technical adviser	as C.S. Ramsay-Hill
1952	Son of Ali Baba	equestrian technical advisor	Uncredited
1952	The Snows of Kilimanjaro	technical advisor	Uncredited
1952	Bwana Devil	technical advisor	as Major Ramsay Hill
1953	King of the Khyber Rifles	technical advisor	
1954	Tanganyika	technical advisor	Uncredited
1954	Bengal Brigade	technical advisor	Uncredited
1956	Back from Eternity	dialogue coach	Uncredited
