= Escape (radio program) =

Radio anthology series

- Genre: Adventure
- Running time: 30 minutes
- Country of origin: United States
- Language: English
- Home station: CBS
- Written by: Les Crutchfield, John Dunkel
- Directed by: Norman MacDonnell, William N. Robson
- Produced by: Norman MacDonnell
- Narrated by: Paul Frees, William Conrad
- Original release: July 7, 1947 – September 25, 1954
- No. of episodes: 228

Escape is an American radio drama. It was radio's leading anthology series of high-adventure radio dramas, airing on CBS from July 7, 1947 to September 25, 1954.

== Overview ==
Since the program did not have a regular sponsor like Suspense (a sister program that often used the same actors and scripts), it was subjected to frequent schedule shifts and lower production budgets, although Richfield Oil signed on as a sponsor for five months in 1950.

Despite these problems, Escape enthralled many listeners during its seven-year run. The series' well-remembered opening combined Mussorgsky's Night on Bald Mountain with this introduction, as intoned by William Conrad and later Paul Frees:

"Tired of the everyday grind? Ever dream of a life of romantic adventure? Want to get away from it all? We offer you... Escape!"

Following the opening theme, a second announcer (usually Roy Rowan) would add:

"Escape! Designed to free you from the four walls of today for a half-hour of high adventure!"

== Adaptations ==
Of the more than 230 Escape episodes, most have survived in good condition. Many story premises, both originals and adaptations, involved a protagonist in dire life-or-death straits, and the series featured more science fiction and supernatural tales than Suspense. Some of the memorable adaptations include Daphne du Maurier's "The Birds", Carl Stephenson's "Leiningen Versus the Ants", Algernon Blackwood's "Confession", Ray Bradbury's oft-reprinted "Mars Is Heaven", George R. Stewart's Earth Abides (the program's only two-parter), Richard Connell's "The Most Dangerous Game" and F. Scott Fitzgerald's "The Diamond as Big as the Ritz".

John Collier's "Evening Primrose", about people who live inside a department store, was later adapted to TV as a Stephen Sondheim musical starring Anthony Perkins. William Conrad, Harry Bartell and Elliott Reid were heard in the chilling "Three Skeleton Key" (broadcast on 15 November 1949), the tale of three men trapped in an isolated lighthouse by thousands of rats; the half-hour was adapted from an Esquire short story by the French writer George Toudouze and later remade for the March 17, 1950 broadcast starring Vincent Price, Harry Bartell and Jeff Corey and again for the August 9, 1953 broadcast starring Paul Frees, Ben Wright and Jay Novello.

Other actors on the series included Elvia Allman, Eleanor Audley, Parley Baer, Michael Ann Barrett, Tony Barrett, Harry Bartell, Ted Bliss, Lillian Buyeff, Ken Christy, William Conrad, Ted de Corsia, John Dehner, Don Diamond, Paul Dubov, Sam Edwards, Virginia Gregg, Lou Merrill, Howard McNear, Jess Kirkpatrick, Dee J. Thompson, Shep Menken, Frank Gerstle, George Neise, Jeanette Nolan, Dan O'Herlihy, Barney Phillips, Forrest Lewis, Robert Griffin, Alan Reed, Bill Johnstone, Sandra Gould, Junius Matthews, Carleton G. Young, Marvin Miller, Frank Lovejoy, Berry Kroeger, Vic Perrin, Elliott Lewis, Eleanore Tanin, Herb Vigran, Jack Webb, Peggy Webber, and Will Wright.

Music was supplied by Del Castillo, organist Ivan Ditmars, Cy Feuer, Wilbur Hatch and Leith Stevens. The primary announcer was Roy Rowan, while the introductory signature voice (the dramatic "voice of Escape") was played most often by either Paul Frees or William Conrad, with other actors filling in at various times.

A television counterpart aired on CBS TV for a few months during 1950.

The program's opening announcement—"Tired of the everyday grind?"—was employed as a slogan for the counterculture magazine, New Escapologist.

== List of episodes ==
Episode No	Title	Author	Star	Release date
Pilot	"Dead of Night"	John Baines	Art Carney	03-21-47
1	"The Man Who Would Be King"	Rudyard Kipling, adapted by Les Crutchfield	Raymond Lawrence	07-07-47
2	"Operation Fleur de Lis"	William N. Robson	Jack Webb	07-14-47
3	"The Diamond as Big as the Ritz"	F. Scott Fitzgerald, adapted by Les Crutchfield	Jack Edwards Jr.	07-21-47
4	"Typhoon"	Joseph Conrad, adapted by Les Crutchfield	Frank Lovejoy	07-28-47
5	"The Sire de Maletroit's Door"	Robert Louis Stevenson, adapted by Les Crutchfield	Elliott Lewis	08-04-47
6	"The Ring of Thoth"	Sir Arthur Conan Doyle, adapted by Les Crutchfield	Jack Webb	08-11-47
7	"The Fourth Man"	John Russell, adapted by Irving Ravetch	William Johnstone	08-18-47
8	"The Most Dangerous Game"	Richard Connell, adapted by Irving Ravetch	Hans Conried	10-01-47
9	"Run of the Yellow Mail"			10-08-47
10	"A Shipment of Mute Fate"	Martin Storm, adapted by Les Crutchfield	Jack Webb	10-15-47
11	"The Fall of the House of Usher"	Edgar Allan Poe, adapted by Les Crutchfield	Paul Frees	10-22-47
12	"Pollock and the Porroh Man"	H.G. Wells, adapted by John Dunkel	Barton Yarborough	10-29-47
13	"Evening Primrose"	John Collier, adapted by John Dunkel	Elliott Lewis	11-05-47
14	"The Young Man With the Cream Tarts"	Robert Louis Stevenson, adapted by William N. Robson	Paul Frees	11-12-47
15	"Casting the Runes"	M. R. James, adapted by Irving Ravetch	John McIntire	11-19-47
16	"The Country of the Blind"	H.G. Wells, adapted by John Dunkel	Paul Frees	11-26-47
17	"Taboo"	Geoffrey Household, adapted by John Dunkel	Paul Frees	12-03-47
18	"An Occurrence at Owl Creek Bridge"	Ambrose Bierce, adapted by William N. Robson	Harry Bartell	12-10-47
19	"Wild Oranges"	Joseph Hergesheimer, adapted by John Dunkel	Paul Frees	12-17-47
20	"Back for Christmas"	John Collier, adapted by Robert Tallman	Paul Frees	12-24-47
21	"Confession"	Algernon Blackwood, adapted by John Dunkel	William Conrad	12-31-47
22	"The Second Class Passenger"	Percival Gibbons, adapted by William N. Robson	Harry Bartell	01-07-48
23	"Leinengen vs. the Ants"	Carl Stephenson, adapted by Robert Ryf	William Conrad	01-14-48
24	"Papa Benjamin"	Cornell Woolrich, adapted by John Dunkel	Frank Lovejoy	01-21-48
25	"Three Good Witnesses"	Harold Lamb, adapted by John Dunkel	Morgan Farley	01-28-48
26	"The Vanishing Lady"	Alexander Woollcott, adapted by William N. Robson	Joan Banks	02-01-48
27	"Snake Doctor"	Irvin S. Cobb, adapted by Fred Howard	William Conrad	02-08-48
28	"Ancient Sorceries"	Algernon Blackwood, adapted by Les Crutchfield	Paul Frees	02-15-48
29	"How Love Came to Professor Guildea"	Robert Hichens, adapted by Les Crutchfield	Luis Van Rooten	02-22-48
30	"The Grove of Ashtaroth"	John Buchan, adapted by Les Crutchfield	Paul Frees	02-29-48
31	"Jimmy Goggles...the God"	H.G. Wells, adapted by Les Crutchfield		03-07-48
32	"Log of the Evening Star"	Alfred Noyes, adapted by Les Crutchfield	Jack Webb	03-14-48
33	"Misfortune's Isle"	Richard Matthew Hallet, adapted by Les Crutchfield	Paul Frees	03-21-48
34	"A Shipment of Mute Fate"	Martin Storm, adapted by Les Crutchfield	Harry Bartell	03-28-48
35	"Action"	C.E. Montague, adapted by Les Crutchfield	Berry Kroeger	04-04-48
36	"The Brute"	Joseph Conrad, adapted by Les Crutchfield	Dan O'Herlihy	04-11-48
37	"The Drums of the Fore and Aft"	Rudyard Kipling, adapted by Les Crutchfield	Gil Stratton	04-18-48
38	"The Fourth Man"	John Russell, adapted by Irving Ravetch	Joseph Kearns	04-25-48
39	"John Jock Todd"	Robert Simpson	Wilms Herbert	05-02-48
40	"The Time Machine"	H.G. Wells, adapted by Irving Ravetch	Jeff Corey	05-09-48
41	"The Match"	James Oliver Curwood, adapted by Les Crutchfield	Frank Lovejoy	05-16-48
42	"Leinengen vs. the Ants"	Carl Stephenson, adapted by Robert Ryf	William Conrad	05-23-48
43	"Beau Geste"	Percival Christopher Wren, adapted by Les Crutchfield	Jay Novello	06-06-48
44	"The Country of the Blind"	H.G. Wells, adapted by John Dunkel	Paul Frees	06-20-48
45	"A Tooth for Paul Revere"	Stephen Vincent Benét, adapted by John Dunkel	Harry Bartell	07-04-48
46	"She"	H. Rider Haggard, adapted by John Dunkel	Ben Wright	07-11-48
47	"Habit"	F. R. Buckley, adapted by Les Crutchfield	John Dehner	07-18-48
48	"The Man Who Would Be King"	Rudyard Kipling, adapted by Les Crutchfield	Ben Wright	08-01-48
49	"The Fugitive"	Vincent Starrett, adapted by John Dunkel	Luis Van Rooten	08-15-48
50	"S.S. San Pedro"	James Gould Cozzens, adapted by Les Crutchfield	John Dehner	08-22-48
51	"The Diamond as Big as the Ritz"	F. Scott Fitzgerald, adapted by Les Crutchfield	Sam Edwards	08-29-48
52	"A Dream of Armageddon"	H.G. Wells, adapted by Les Crutchfield	Betty Lou Gerson	09-05-48
53	"Evening Primrose"	John Collier, adapted by John Dunkel	Harry Bartell	09-12-48
54	"The Man Who Could Work Miracles"	H.G. Wells, adapted by Les Crutchfield	Ben Wright	09-19-48
55	"The Lost Special"	Sir Arthur Conan Doyle, adapted by Les Crutchfield	Ben Wright	02-12-49
56	"Orient Express"	Graham Greene, adapted by Sheldon Stark	Edgar Barrier	02-19-49
57	"Red Wine"	Lawrence Blochman, adapted by Morton Lewis and Les Crutchfield	Jeff Chandler	02-26-49
58	"Conqueror's Isle"	Nelson Bond, adapted by John Meston	David Ellis	03-05-49
59	"He Who Rides the Tiger"	James Norman, adapted by Les Crutchfield	William Conrad	03-12-49
60	"A Shipment of Mute Fate"	Martin Storm, adapted by Les Crutchfield	Berry Kroeger	03-13-49
61	"Finger of Doom"	Cornell Woolrich, adapted by John Dunkel	Harry Bartell	03-19-49
62	"The Country of the Blind"	H.G. Wells, adapted by John Dunkel	Edmond O'Brien	03-20-49
63	"The Adaptive Ultimate"	Stanley G. Weinbaum, adapted by John Dunkel	Edgar Barrier	03-26-49
64	"The Diamond as Big as the Ritz"	F. Scott Fitzgerald, adapted by Les Crutchfield	Sam Edwards	03-27-49
65	"Confidential Agent"	Graham Greene, adapted by Ken Crossen	Berry Kroeger	04-02-49
66	"When the Man Comes, Follow Him"	Ralph Bates, adapted by Les Crutchfield	Paul Dubov	04-09-49
67	"The General Died at Dawn"	Charles Booth, adapted by Walter Newman	William Conrad	04-16-49
68	"The Great Impersonation"	E. Phillips Oppenheim, adapted by Walter Newman	Edgar Barrier	04-23-49
69	"The Fourth Man"	John Russell, adapted by Irving Ravetch	Lawrence Dobkin	07-07-49
70	"The Drums of the Fore and Aft"	Rudyard Kipling, adapted by Les Crutchfield	Ben Wright	07-14-49
71	"Action"	C.E. Montague, adapted by Les Crutchfield	Joseph Kearns	07-21-49
72	"The Second Class Passenger"	Percival Gibbons, adapted by William N. Robson	Parley Baer	07-28-49
73	"Leinengen vs. the Ants"	Carl Stephenson, adapted by Robert Ryf	Tudor Owen, Gerald Mohr	08-04-49
74	"Red Wine"	Lawrence Blochman, adapted by John Dunkel	Willard Waterman	08-11-49
75	"Snake Doctor"	Irvin S. Cobb, adapted by Fred Howard	William Conrad	08-18-49
76	"Evening Primrose"	John Collier, adapted by John Dunkel	Harry Bartell	08-25-49
77	"The Fortune of Vargas"	Geoffrey Household, adapted by Les Crutchfield	Victor Mature	09-21-49
78	"Wild Oranges"	Joseph Hergesheimer, adapted by John Dunkel	Van Heflin	09-28-49
79	"The Primitive"			10-08-49
80	"The Sure Thing"	John & Gwen Bagni	William Conrad	10-15-49
81	"Night in Havana"	Burnham Carter, adapted by Walter Newman	Tony Barrett	10-22-49
82	"The Blue Wall"			10-29-49
83	"Plunder of the Sun"	David Dodge, adapted by John Dunkel	Paul Frees	11-08-49
84	"Flood on the Goodwins"	David Devine, adapted by James Poe	Jack Edwards	11-01-49
85	"Three Skeleton Key"	George Toudouze, adapted by James Poe	William Conrad, Elliott Reid, Harry Bartell	11-15-49
86	"Maracas"	John & Gwen Bagni	William Conrad	11-22-49
87	"Letter From Jason"	George F. Wert, adapted by Selig Lester	Frank Lovejoy	11-29-49
88	"Command"	James Warner Bellah, adapted by William N. Robson	Elliott Reid, Will Geer	12-06-49
89	"Border Town"	John & Gwen Bagni	Jack Webb	12-13-49
90	"Figure a Dame"	Richard Sales, adapted by Morton Fine & David Fiedkin	Frank Lovejoy	12-20-49
91	"Seeds of Greed"	Freud A. Nelson	Gary Merrill	12-27-49
92	"The Pistol"	Les Crutchfield	Betty Lou Gerson	01-03-50
93	"The Vanishing Lady"	Alexander Woollcott, adapted by William N. Robson	Joan Banks	01-10-50
94	"The Sure Thing"	John & Gwen Bagni	Anthony Ross	01-17-50
95	"Treasure, Inc."	John & Gwen Bagni	Frank Lovejoy	01-24-50
96	"Present Tense"	James Poe	Vincent Price	01-31-50
97	"The Outer Limit"	Graham Doar, adapted by Morton Fine	Frank Lovejoy	02-07-50
98	"Two if by Sea"	Roger Bax, adapted by E. Jack Neuman & John Michael Hayes	John Dehner	02-14-50
99	"The Red Mark"	John Russell, adapted by Les Crutchfield	Harry Bartell	02-21-50
100	"The Man Who Won the War"	Robert Buckner, adapted by William N. Robson	John Dehner	02-28-50
101	"Port Royal"	Harry Rieseberg, adapted by Gil Doud	John Dehner	03-10-50
102	"Three Skeleton Key"	George Toudouze, adapted by James Poe	Vincent Price, Harry Bartell, Jeff Corey	03-17-50
103	"Danger at Matacumbe"	John & Gwen Bagni	Frank Lovejoy	03-24-50
104	"Green Splotches"	T.S. Stribling, adapted by William N. Robson	William Conrad	03-31-50
105	"Ambassador of Poker"	Achmed Abdullah, adapted by John Dunkel	Elliott Reid	04-07-50
106	"The Golden Snake"	Paul Pierce, adapted by Les Crutchfield	Tony Barrett	04-14-50
107	"The Shanghai Document"	John & Gwen Bagni	Ben Wright	04-21-50
108	"Something for Nothing"	H. Vernon Dickson, adapted by Silvia Richards	Anne Morrison	04-28-50
109	"The Man Who Stole the Bible"	John & Gwen Bagni	Rick Vallin	05-05-50
110	"The Rim of Terror"	Hildegard Teilhet, adapted by William N. Robson	Barton Yarborough	05-12-50
111	"Pass to Berlin"	David Friedkin & Morton Fine	Ben Wright	05-19-50
112	"Command"	James Warner Bellah, adapted by William N. Robson	Harry Bartell, John Hoyt	05-26-50
113	"Mars Is Heaven"	Ray Bradbury, adapted by David Friedkin	Ben Wright	06-02-50
114	"The Big Sponge"			06-09-50
115	"Serenade for a Cobra"	Joel Murcott	Charles McGraw	06-16-50
116	"Sundown"	Joel Murcott	Barton Yarborough	06-23-50
117	"Blood Bath"	James Poe	Vincent Price, Paul Frees	06-30-50
118	"A Shipment of Mute Fate"	Martin Storm, adapted by Les Crutchfield	William Conrad	07-10-50
119	"Shark Bait"	Antony Ellis	Harry Bartell	07-14-50
120	"The Yellow Wake"	Bud Nelson	Paul Frees	07-21-50
121	"Poison"	Roald Dahl, adapted by James Poe	Jack Webb	07-28-50
122	"Two Came Back"	Jules Archer	Stacy Harris	08-04-50
123	"The Red Forest"	Antony Ellis	William Conrad	08-11-50
124	"The Footprint"	Gouverneur Morris, adapted by Richard Chandlee	Charles Davis	08-18-50
125	"Crossing Paris"	Marcel Ayme, adapted by John Meston	Barney Phillips	08-25-50
126	"A Sleeping Draught"	Weston Martyr, adapted by Antony Ellis	Ben Wright	10-01-50
127	"Roulette"	Antony Ellis	John Dehner	10-08-50
128	"The Power of Hammer"	Antony Ellis	Anne Morrison	10-15-50
129	"The Time Machine"	H.G. Wells, adapted by Irving Ravetch	Lawrence Dobkin	10-22-50
130	"Seven Hours to Freedom"	Bud Nelson	Barney Phillips	10-29-50
131	"Earth Abides" Part 1	George Stewart, adapted by David Ellis	John Dehner	11-05-50
132	"Earth Abides" Part 2	George Stewart, adapted by David Ellis	John Dehner	11-12-50
133	"Journey into Fear"	Eric Ambler, adapted by Antony Ellis	Ben Wright	11-19-50
134	"Funeral Fires"	Charles E. Israel	Ben Wright	11-26-50
135	"This Side of Nowhere"	Antony Ellis	William Conrad	12-03-50
136	"A Passenger to Bali"	Ellis St. Joseph, adapted by Norman Macdonnell	John Dehner	12-10-50
137	"Wild Jack Rhett"	Ernest Haycox, adapted by John Meston	John Dehner	12-17-50
138	"The Cave"	Antony Ellis	John Dehner	12-24-50
139	"The Man Who Could Work Miracles"	H.G. Wells, adapted by Les Crutchfield	Ben Wright	12-31-50
140	"Conquest"	Leonard Lee, adapted by David Ellis	William Conrad	01-07-51
141	"A Bullet for Mr. Smith"	Antony Ellis	John Dehner	01-14-51
142	"The Killer Mine"	Hammond Innis, adapted by Antony Ellis	John Dehner	02-11-51
143	"The Follower"	Patrick Quentin, adapted by Les Crutchfield	William Conrad	02-18-51
144	"The Island"	Millard Kaufman	Harry Bartell	07-11-51
145	"Macao"	Herb Purdum	Raymond Burr	07-18-51
146	"The Earthmen"	Ray Bradbury, adapted by Walter Newman	Byron Kane	07-25-51
147	"The Gladiator"	Millard Kaufman	William Conrad	08-01-51
148	"Up Periscope"	Alex Hudson, adapted by William Froug	Hy Averback	08-08-51
149	"A Rough Shoot"	Geoffrey Household, adapted by Arthur Ross	Ben Wright	08-15-51
150	"The Silent Horror"	Hugh Cave, adapted by Les Crutchfield	Lou Krugman	08-22-51
151	"The Man Who Stole the Bible"	John & Gwen Bagni	Sam Pierce	08-29-51
152	"Gringo"	E. Jack Neuman	William Conrad	10-12-52
153	"The Price of the Head"	John Russell, adapted by John Meston	William Conrad	10-19-52
154	"Robert of Huntingdon"	Adapted by Antony Ellis	William Conrad	10-26-52
155	"The Running Man"	Herb Purdum	Vic Perrin	11-02-52
156	"The Return"	Kathleen Hite	Lawrence Dobkin	11-09-52
157	"The Loup-Garou"	William Froug	William Conrad	11-16-52
158	"Transport to Terror"		William Conrad	11-23-52
159	"Pagosa"		William Conrad	11-30-52
160	"Incident in Quito"	Ross Murray	Larry Thor	12-07-52
161	"Four Went Home"	Antony Ellis	William Conrad	12-14-52
162	"The Man Who Liked Dickens"	Evelyn Waugh, adapted by John Meston	Terry Kilburn	12-21-52
163	"Nightmare in the Sun"			12-28-52
164	"Dangerous Man"			01-04-53
165	"A Matter of Conscience"	Antony Ellis	John Dehner	01-18-53
166	"Conqueror's Isle"	Nelson Bond, adapted by John Meston	Harry Bartell	01-11-53
167	"Diary of a Madman"	Les Crutchfield	Ben Wright	01-25-53
168	"A Study in Wax"	Antony Ellis	William Conrad	02-01-53
169	"Jetsam"	John Russell, adapted by Norman Macdonnell	John Dehner	02-08-53
170	"Wild Jack Rhett"	Ernest Haycox, adapted by John Meston	John Dehner	02-15-53
171	"I Saw Myself Running"	Antony Ellis	Georgia Ellis	02-22-53
172	"The Tramp"	Antony Ellis	Ben Wright	03-01-53
173	"The Island"	Millard Kaufman	William Conrad	03-08-53
174	"The Man With the Steel Teeth"	John Dehner	Jack Kruschen	03-15-53
175	"Pressure"	Richard Chandlee	Larry Thor	03-22-53
176	"The Invader"	Michael Gray	Howard McNear	03-29-53
177	"A Sleeping Draught"	Weston Martyr, adapted by Antony Ellis	Ben Wright	04-05-53
178	"Classified Secret"	Antony Ellis	Parley Baer	04-12-53
179	"El Guitarero"	E. Jack Neuman	Eddie Firestone	04-19-53
180	"Derelict"	Victor Schwartz, adapted by Larry Roman	Charlotte Lawrence	04-26-53
181	"Lily and the Colonel"	John Dehner	Ben Wright	05-03-53
182	"The Vessel of Wrath"	Somerset Maugham, adapted by Antony Ellis	Alan Reed	05-10-53
183	"North of Polaris"	Charles Smith	William Conrad	05-17-53
184	"The Blue Hotel"			05-24-53
185	"A Good Thing"	Kathleen Hite	Jack Kruschen	05-31-53
186	"The Voyages of Sinbad"	Adapted by Antony Ellis	Ted de Corsia	06-07-53
187	"Clear for Action"	Antony Ellis	Ben Wright	06-14-53
188	"The Far Away Island"	Charles Smith	Ted de Corsia	06-21-53
189	"One-Eighth Apache"		William Conrad	06-28-53
190	"A Source of Irritation"	Stacey Aumonier, adapted by Mayer Dolinsky	Ben Wright	07-05-53
191	"The Out-Station"	Somerset Maugham, adapted by Antony Ellis	Alistair Duncan	07-12-53
192	"Open Boat"	Stephen Crane, adapted by E. Jack Neuman	Bob Sweeney	07-19-53
193	"The Notebook"	William J. Radcliff	John Dehner	07-26-53
194	"The Red Forest"	Antony Ellis	William Conrad	08-02-53
195	"Three Skeleton Key"	George Toudouze, adapted by James Poe	Paul Frees, Ben Wright	08-09-53
196	"The Thirteenth Trunk"	Cecil Carnes, adapted by Gus Bayz	Alec Harford	08-16-53
197	"The Man from Tomorrow"	Irving Reis, adapted by Antony Ellis	Lawrence Dobkin	08-23-53
198	"The Game"	Antony Ellis		08-30-53
199	"Train from Olbiefelde"	Ross Murray	William Conrad	09-06-53
200	"The Abominable Snowman"	Antony Ellis	William Conrad	09-13-53
201	"The Log"	Marianne Mosner, adapted by Antony Ellis	James Nusser	09-20-53
202	"The Untouchable"	James Henderson	John Dehner	09-27-53
203	"Zero Hour"	Ray Bradbury, adapted by Antony Ellis	Eve McVeagh	10-04-53
204	"Elementals"	Stephen Vincent Benét, adapted by Meyer Dolinsky	William Conrad	10-11-53
205	"The Bird of Paradise"	John Russell, adapted by John Meston	John Dehner	03-11-54
206	"Violent Night"	Les Crutchfield	William Conrad	03-18-54
207	"The Second Shot"	Alexandre Dumas, adapted by Les Crutchfield	John Dehner	03-25-54
208	"The Return"	Kathleen Hite	Lawrence Dobkin	04-01-54
209	"The Scarlet Plague"	Jack London, adapted by Les Crutchfield	Barney Phillips	04-08-54
210	"Affair at Mandrake"	Ben Wright	Ben Wright	04-15-54
211	"The Adversary"	John Russell, adapted by Norman Macdonnell	Lawrence Dobkin	05-06-54
212	"An Ordinary Man"	Kathleen Hite	Lawrence Dobkin	06-03-54
213	"Benchillina and the Fisherman"	John Dehner	Vic Perrin	06-10-54
214	"Blood Waters"	Tony Barrett	Tony Barrett	06-17-54
215	"Judgment Day at Crippled Deer"	Les Crutchfield	Lawrence Dobkin	06-24-54
216	"The Dark Wall"	Kathleen Hite	John Dehner	07-01-54
217	"The Birds"	Daphne du Maurier, adapted by Robert Wright	Paul Frees	07-10-54
218	"The Eye of Evil"	Kathleen Hite	John Dehner	07-17-54
219	"Flood on the Goodwins"	David Devine, adapted by James Poe	Vic Perrin	07-24-54
220	"Night of the Guns"	David Friedkin & Morton Fine	Herb Ellis	07-31-54
221	"The Price of the Head"	John Russell, adapted by John Meston	Ben Wright	08-07-54
222	"The Coward"	E. Jack Neuman	Barney Phillips	08-14-54
223	"Two and Two Make Four"	Walter Newman	Shepard Menken	08-21-54
224	"The King of Owanatu"	Robert Tallman	Tony Barrett	08-28-54
225	"The Boiling Sea"	Vincent McHugh, adapted by John Dunkel	Clayton Post	09-04-54
226	"Carnival in Vienna"	Morton Fine & David Friedkin	Barney Phillips	09-11-54
227	"The Target"	Tony Barrett	Edgar Barrier	09-18-54
228	"The Heart of Kali"	Ross Murray	Paul Richards	09-25-54

== See also ==
- Audio theatre
- Old-time radio

== Listen to ==
- Escape and Suspense
- OTR Network Library: Escape (203 episodes)
- Theater of the Ears: Escape
- Internet Archive: Escape
