= Skeleton Key (disambiguation) =

A skeleton key is a key that has been filed in such a way as to bypass the security measures placed inside a warded lock.

Skeleton Key may also refer to:

== Literature ==
- Skeleton Key (comics), a comic book by Andi Watson
- Skeleton Key (novel), a novel by Anthony Horowitz published in 2002
- The Skeleton Key, a detective novel by Bernard Capes, published posthumously in 1920
- Skeleton Key: A Dictionary for Deadheads, a book by David Shenk and Steve Silberman, published in 1994

== Music ==
- Skeleton Key (band), an American rock band
- Skeleton Key Records, a Liverpool-based independent record label
- The Skeleton Key (album), by Roc Marciano and the Alchemist, 2024
- "Skeleton Key", a song by Days of the New from their second album
- "The Skeleton Key", a song by Epica from Omega

== Other uses ==
- The Skeleton Key, a 2005 film by Ian Softley

== See also ==
- A Skeleton Key to Finnegans Wake, a work of literary criticism by Joseph Campbell and Henry Morton Robinson
- "Three Skeleton Key", a short story by George G. Toudouze
