= Three Skeleton Key =

French short story by Georges-Gustave Toudouze

- Short story by George G. Toudouze
- Country: France
- Language: English
- Genres: Adventure, horror, short story

Publication
- Published in: Esquire
- Publication type: Magazine
- Media type: Print
- Publication date: January 1937

"Three Skeleton Key" is a short story by the French author Georges-Gustave Toudouze. The January 1937 edition of Esquire marked its first appearance in English. This suspenseful tale and "Leiningen Versus the Ants" were discovered by the magazine's editor Arnold Gingrich.

Georges-G. Toudouze (1877–1972) was born in Paris, France. His father, Gustave Toudouze, was a well-known author of the time. The younger Toudouze wrote on such topics as art, architecture, travel and French naval history. Although he penned numerous adventure novels and short stories, he is today best known for "Three Skeleton Key".

== Plot ==
The plot involves three men tending a lighthouse on an island off the coast of French Guiana. The rock the lighthouse stands on is dubbed 'Three Skeleton Key', named after a tragedy when three convicts escaping from Cayenne became ship-wrecked on the rock and eventually died of hunger and thirst – the only thing left of them were a heap of bones cleaned off by scavenging birds. The three lighthouse attendants are headkeeper, Itchoua (the eldest of the men), Le Gleo, and the narrator (whose name is never given).

An abandoned ship, infested with ferocious rats, makes landfall. A life-and-death struggle ensues as the men seek to save themselves from the hungry horde, who swarm over the lighthouse. The three men barely survive fending off the rats when they break into the tower. The men escape into the lighthouse gallery, which has a metal trapdoor that the rats cannot gnaw through, and are able to use the light to signal an investigating patrol boat. Eventually the rats are lured off the island onto a barge loaded with meat, which is then set on fire by incendiary shells. Many of the rats die and the survivors are devoured by the sharks that infest the waters. The fates of the men are then revealed by the narrator: Le Gleo went insane from the events and was locked away in a French asylum, and Itchoua dies of infection from rat bites and scratches. The narrator continues to work in the lighthouse until his service time is over.

== Publishing history ==
This work first appeared in French in 1927 as "La tour d'épouvante", and was featured in Toudouze's 1946 short story collection Aux Feux tournants des Phares...: Récits de Mer et de Haute Mer with illustrations by P. Peron. The first English edition of "Three Skeleton Key" was in 1937 in Esquire.

== Adaptations ==
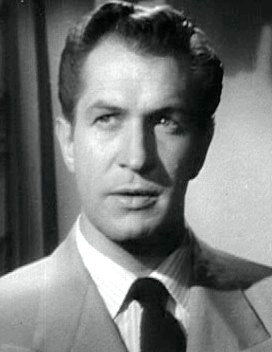
Vincent Price (pictured in Laura) has performed as "Jean" in multiple radio versions of "Three Skeleton Key".

James Poe adapted the story for radio in a version that aired on Escape on November 15, 1949. Poe's script gave different names to the three characters: the narrator is named "Jean", the head keeper Itchoua is named "Louis" and Le Gleo is now a hunchbacked former actor named "Auguste"; the adaptation also provides a different and more chilling reason as to why the rats eventually leave the lighthouse.

- The 1949 broadcast featured William Conrad as "Louis", Harry Bartell as "Auguste" and Elliott Reid as "Jean".
- Poe's adaptation was rebroadcast by popular demand in 1950 and 1953, each with a different cast: Vincent Price as "Jean", Harry Bartell again as "Auguste" and Jeff Corey as "Louis" in the March 17, 1950 broadcast; and Paul Frees as "Louis", Ben Wright as "Jean" and Jay Novello as "Auguste" in the August 9, 1953 broadcast.
- Vincent Price is the actor most associated with the radio play, performing the role of "Jean" again in 1956 and 1958 for Suspense.

The One Act Audio Theatre revisited "Three Skeleton Key" in 2001. A modern recording of the piece can be found at the organization's web site as well as Poe's script.
