= Les Crutchfield =

American scriptwriter (1916–1966)

- Born: Leslie Marcellus Crutchfield; January 23, 1916; Hutchinson, Kansas, United States
- Died: October 6, 1966 (aged 50); Los Angeles, California, United States
- Occupation: Scriptwriter
- Years active: 1947–1966
- Spouse(s): Thelma Marshall (m. 1938–div. 19??); LaVonne Reardon (1948–his death)
- Children: 1 daughter

Leslie Marcellus Crutchfield (January 23, 1916 – October 6, 1966) was an American scriptwriter for radio and television series between the late 1940s and mid-1960s, most notably for the Western series Gunsmoke, which aired on CBS Radio from 1952 to 1961 and on CBS Television from 1955 to 1975. Crutchfield is credited with writing a total of 138 radio and television stories and scripts for Gunsmoke, a body of work that is second only to the number of episodes written by John Meston, the series' co-creator. While Gunsmoke is the most prominent showcase for Crutchfield's writing talents, he also composed original stories and adapted works by other authors for the CBS radio anthology series Escape as well as other weekly radio and television series and at least two feature films.

== Early life and career ==
Les Crutchfield was born in Kansas in 1916, the elder of two sons of Golda Mary (née Pottorff) and Leslie Dillard Crutchfield. His father, a native of Missouri, worked in Hutchinson as a warehouse foreman for a harvester manufacturer. Young Les received an extensive education, although in college the future writer was drawn initially to science and engineering as careers. He studied geology, mining, and metallurgy as an undergraduate, and in graduate school concentrated on chemistry, mathematics, and psychology. After college Crutchfield applied his training in geology and chemistry and in the late 1930s worked as an explosives consultant for mining companies in Arizona. Soon, however, he returned to academia to accept an engineering position at the California Institute of Technology (Caltech) in Pasadena.

== CBS scriptwriter ==
Around 1946, while still working at Caltech, Crutchfield met Norman Macdonnell, a producer and director for CBS Radio's West Coast or "Hollywood" division, which operated in the facilities of network affiliate KNX in nearby Los Angeles. Not long after they met, Crutchfield drafted some potential stories for network programs and gave them to Macdonnell. His writing apparently impressed CBS staff, for he was soon hired to assist in developing scripts for several popular radio series produced at KNX, including the anthology series Escape, Suspense, and Romance. By 1948 Crutchfield had firmly established himself as a scriptwriter. In fact, in July that year he identifies his profession on his California marriage license as "Radio writer, Independent".

Crutchfield's early years as a CBS scriptwriter are not as well documented as his work for later radio, television, and film projects, but records do show that by 1947 he was adapting stories for Escape. His first script for the series was also its premiere broadcast—an adaptation of Rudyard Kipling's story "The Man Who Would Be King"—presented on July 7, 1947. In its review of that initial episode, the widely read trade paper Variety commends Crutchfield's adaptation, calling it "skil[l]fully scripted". Crutchfield's 45 other adaptations and original scripts for Escape and his work on other series continued to draw regular compliments from reviewers. Examples of two other CBS Radio series that feature episodes written by Crutchfield are the contemporary crime drama Yours Truly, Johnny Dollar and Fort Laramie, an action drama about nineteenth-century United States cavalry troopers and starring Raymond Burr. A few of his scripts for Yours Truly, Johnny Dollar are "The Jones Matter" (1953), "The Piney Corners Matter" (1954), "The Cronin Matter" (1955), and "The Lonely Hearts Matter" (1956). Crutchfield's episodes for Fort Laramie include "Shavetail" (1956) and "Don't Kick My Horse" (1956).

=== Gunsmoke on radio ===
During Crutchfield's first years working for CBS, Macdonnell began collaborating with another scriptwriter, John Meston, on developing new weekly series. One series the two men proposed to the network was an "'adult Western'" that would present character-driven "Old West" stories set in and around Dodge City, Kansas in the 1870s. After their proposal was approved for production, Macdonnell and Meston invited Crutchfield to join their team of writers for the new project, which had been titled Gunsmoke. Its first episode, "Billy the Kid", was written by Walter B. Newman and aired on CBS Radio on April 26, 1952.

The new Western quickly became popular with audiences, and Crutchfield quickly became a frequent contributor of stories and scripts. In addition to himself, Macdonnell, Meston, and Newman, seven other writers furnished content for Gunsmoke in the 1952–1953 radio season. Nevertheless, Meston and Crutchfield's work that year comprises the great majority of the broadcasts, together accounting for 48 of the 71 episodes presented. In 1953, The New York Times reviewer Jack Gould praised the series' writing and credited its quality foremost to Meston and Crutchfield, whom he described as "craftsmen in their field". "They", Gould notes in his review, "concentrate on characterizations rather than gunplay and recognize that, even in the old West, people were more interesting than horses." Another reviewer in 1953, Anton Remenih of the Chicago Daily Tribune, complimented the series' scripts too, but in his assessment focuses on Crutchfield, stating he "does not treat his listeners as if they were morons able to understand nothing more subtle than a pistol shot or a punch in the jaw."

Crutchfield's initial script for Gunsmoke, "Jaliscoe", is the third episode of the 1952–1953 radio season and aired on May 10, 1952. During the rest of that first season, he provided 16 more scripts for broadcast. Ultimately, Crutchfield wrote 81 scripts for the radio version of Gunsmoke, which amounts to 17 percent of the series' entire nine-year catalog in that medium. His most prolific year writing for Gunsmoke on radio was the 1956–1957 season, when he furnished 38 of its 52 episodes.

=== Gunsmoke on television ===
When CBS also started a televised version of Gunsmoke in 1955, Crutchfield wrote episodes for that series as well. He created teleplays for the "small screen" while still composing scripts for Gunsmoke's ongoing radio counterpart and for Yours Truly, Johnny Dollar and Fort Laramie. Crutchfield's first episode for Gunsmoke on television is "Reed Survives", initially broadcast December 31, 1955. He then composed the teleplay for Meston's story "No Handcuffs" that aired three weeks later. For the next decade Crutchfield continued to provide stories and scripts periodically for the televised series. His final script for Gunsmoke, one co-written with Paul Savage, is "Mistaken Identity" broadcast on March 18, 1967, five months after Crutchfield's death.

=== "Festus" ===
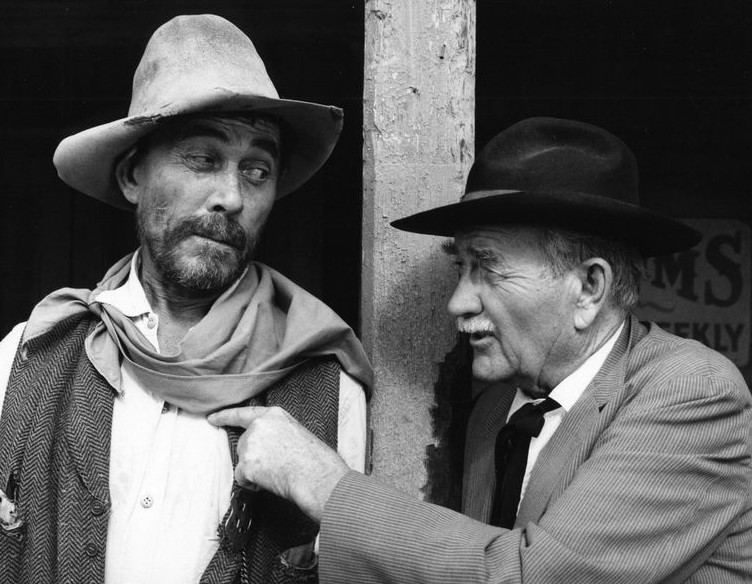
Ken Curtis (left) in 1974 portraying "Festus", the character Crutchfield created 12 years earlier

The most enduring character Crutchfield created in his many Gunsmoke stories and scripts is Festus Haggen. Portrayed by actor Ken Curtis, the scruffy and illiterate Festus had been born, according to Crutchfield's script, in the "hills" and raised by a family or clan of "outlaws"; but over the course of the series he becomes the trusted deputy of Marshal Matt Dillon (James Arness). Festus first appears during the eighth season of Gunsmoke in the episode "Us Haggens", which aired on December 8, 1962. Subsequent scripts by Crutchfield, such as "Once a Haggen", and Festus-related episodes by other writers provided a foundation on which Curtis further developed the appearance, mannerisms, and personality of the character. His portrayal of Festus proved to be so popular with viewers that Curtis became a regular cast member beginning with the episode "Prairie Wolfer" in January 1964.

=== Writing style and credits for Gunsmoke ===
Gunsmoke as an "adult Western" includes radio and television episodes that in their content and tone range from serious and bleak to comical. Macdonnell, as a producer, director and as a writer himself for Gunsmoke, regarded Crutchfield as "one of the solid contributors" to the series and a dependable, highly versatile author who was skilled at crafting "dark" storylines but better known among his colleagues for applying light, humorous touches to episodes. William N. Robson, another director at CBS, who had worked with Crutchfield on Escape, considered the former engineer to be among the "very top rank of radio writers"; and he admired Crutchfield's stories and scripts for the depth of emotion they conveyed and for their attention to detail:

...[he was] an exceptionally fine dramatist, his characters are sensitively developed and his plays never lack a quiet and warming sense of humor. In a medium [radio] which is of necessity "blind", his scripts are almost unique in the degree to which they visualize the action for the listener.

Details about all of Crutchfield's 81 Gunsmoke radio episodes and his 57 stories and scripts for the televised episodes are available in the 1990 reference Gunsmoke: A Complete History and Analysis of the Legendary Broadcast Series by SuzAnne and Gabor Barabas. Internal links to the following Wikipedia pages also identify the title, writer, and original airdate of every Gunsmoke episode broadcast between 1952 and 1975: list of radio episodes and list of television episodes.

== Other television and film work ==
Outside his work for Gunsmoke, Crutchfield wrote scripts and adapted stories for other television series between 1951 and 1966. Some of those series include Gruen Guild Theater, Chevron Theatre, The Revlon Mirror Theater, The Pepsi-Cola Playhouse, The Man Called X, Schlitz Playhouse, Rawhide, Frontier Circus, The Tall Man, The Virginian, and The Loner. Crutchfield also developed stories for two Hollywood feature films released in 1959: Tarzan's Greatest Adventure starring Gordon Scott and the Last Train from Gun Hill co-starring Anthony Quinn and Kirk Douglas.

== Personal life and death ==
Crutchfield married twice. On April 23, 1938 he wed Thelma Louise Marshall in Tucson, Arizona. Records of his second marriage confirm that his previous marriage ended in divorce, although the year is not given. After that divorce, Crutchfield married Oregon native LaVonne Eileen (née Anderson) Reardon in Pasadena on July 30, 1948. The couple had one child, a daughter, Sandra Lyn.

In October 1966, Crutchfield died at age 50 after losing "a valiant battle against cancer". His gravesite is located at Pacific View Memorial Park in Corona del Mar, California.
