= Last Train from Gun Hill =

1959 film by John Sturges

- Theatrical release poster
- Directed by: John Sturges
- Screenplay by: James Poe
- Story by: ("Showdown"); Les Crutchfield
- Produced by: Hal B. Wallis
- Starring: Kirk Douglas; Anthony Quinn
- Cinematography: Charles B. Lang Jr.
- Music by: Dimitri Tiomkin
- Production companies: Hal Wallis Productions; Bryna Productions
- Distributed by: Paramount Pictures
- Release date: July 29, 1959
- Running time: 90 minutes
- Country: United States
- Language: English
- Box office: $2.5 million (est. US/ Canada rentals)

Last Train from Gun Hill is a 1959 American Western film in VistaVision and Technicolor, directed by John Sturges. It stars Kirk Douglas, Anthony Quinn and Earl Holliman. Douglas and Holliman had previously appeared together in Sturges' Gunfight at the O.K. Corral (1957), which used much of the same crew.

== Plot ==
Two old friends, Matt Morgan and Craig Belden are now in different professions. Belden, a rich cattle baron, is the de facto ruler of the town of Gun Hill. Morgan is a U.S. Marshal living in another town with his Cherokee wife and young son, Petey.

Two young drunken cowboys rape and murder Morgan's wife while she is returning with their son from a visit to her father. She succeeds in inflicting a deep and identifying whip wound on the cheek of one of her attackers. While the attackers are preoccupied, the boy escapes on one of the killers' horses, which bears a distinctive, fancy saddle.

Morgan sets off to find the killer. One clue is the saddle, which he recognizes as belonging to his old friend, Belden. Assuming it was stolen, Morgan travels to Gun Hill to pick up the trail. Morgan goes to Belden's ranch intending to return the saddle and get information. Once there, he quickly realizes that Belden's son Rick is the killer.

Belden refuses to give up his only son to whom he is deeply devoted. Morgan in turn vows to capture Rick and get him on the last train from Gun Hill that same day.

In town, Morgan encounters a hostile community with no one willing to cooperate with him or help him find Rick. One person, Belden's former lover, Linda, secretly tells him where Rick is likely to be. Morgan manages to take Rick prisoner, holding him at the hotel despite resistance from the hotelkeeper.

In the meantime, Craig Belden sets out from the ranch with his men and arrive in town to discover that Rick is now Morgan's prisoner and handcuffed to the bed of a hotel room. After a short negotiation between Craig Belden and Morgan, a shootout begins. Morgan manages to hold off Belden's shooters and is followed by a tense standoff. Now, Linda, who knows everyone in town becomes a prominent go-between. She enters the hotel and unsuccessfully pleads Craig's case to free Rick, but Morgan asks her, surprisingly, for a shotgun. Back in the saloon Linda meets Lee, who confesses to being Rick's accomplice in rape and murder. She has also established that Craig is not willing to marry her.

So, Linda resolves to help Morgan and sneaks a shotgun to Morgan's hotel room. In the meantime, Lee, sets fire to the hotel to flush out Morgan. With the hotel burning, Morgan presses the shotgun to Rick's chin and comes downstairs, climbs on his buggy and moves slowly toward the train station, with Craig Belden, his armed men and the townspeople following. All the while, Morgan threatens to pull the trigger and kill Rick if an attempt is made to stop him.

At the train station, Lee confronts Morgan and shoots at him but kills Rick by mistake. Morgan then kills Lee with the shotgun. As the train prepares to leave, a devastated Craig Belden confronts Morgan in a final showdown. Morgan kills him, then boards the train as it is pulling out of the station.

== Cast ==
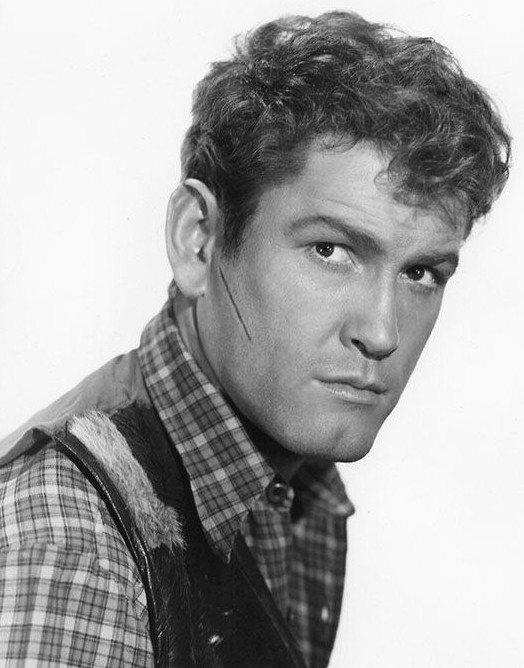
Earl Holliman in a promotional photograph for the film

- Kirk Douglas as Marshal Matt Morgan
- Anthony Quinn as Craig Belden
- Carolyn Jones as Linda
- Earl Holliman as Rick Belden
- Brad Dexter as Beero
- Brian G. Hutton as Lee Smithers (as Brian Hutton)
- Ziva Rodann as Catherine Morgan
- Bing Russell as Skag
- Val Avery as Steve, Horseshoe Bartender
- Walter Sande as Sheriff Bartlett

== Filming locations ==
The movie was filmed in and around Old Tucson Studios outside of Tucson, Arizona, Sonoita, Arizona, as well as at Paramount Studios and their back lot in Los Angeles, California.

== Themes ==
A key theme of the film is the tragic opposition between natural law and manmade law, originally drawn in Sophocles' Antigone.

The backstory of the principal characters sees them operating as partner outlaws in the wilds - an effective state of nature. Subsequently, Morgan and Belden part ways each choosing to settle down and in their own way exemplify a lawful mode of life.

Belden is an exemplar of the natural law. This is partly conveyed in the manner of Plato's Gorgias, with Belden a natural leader of men who has built his own private fiefdom at Gun Hill. He displays Gorgias' virtues in his martial courage, justice and wisdom, though each of these, as with Gorgias, largely serve Belden's own ends: this is the justice of the victor and wisdom of the political operator. To this, crucially, is added that view of natural law which begins at home and with one's own (see Stoicism). The plot turns on Belden regarding his obligation to protect his son as overriding the positive law of the state.

For his part, Morgan is a courageous, dutiful marshal of manmade positive law (Kelsen), indeed declaring at one point "I am the law." Morgan attempts to maintain due process throughout, for example seeking approval of his warrants from the corrupt local sheriff, attempting to see the accused, Rick, to a courthouse, and refusing to initiate violence against Belden. Yet as Morgan proceeds to enforce the law, he struggles to differentiate his own personal stake in the outcome of his actions, perhaps driving him to overcompensate by even stricter application of the law. Compare the "long view" of the corrupt local sheriff, to Morgan's tragic adherence to legal formalism. In slavishly holding to process rather than seeking an unofficial resolution, the suggestion is that much greater damage is done to all involved.

The dynamic is seen in Linda's character arc: describing herself early on as someone who never gave much attention to rules, she finds in Morgan a hero lawman who could save Gun Hill from Belden's abusive control, but in the denouement she surveys the results of Morgan's law enforcement and turns her eyes from him in disappointment.

== Comic book adaptation ==
- Dell Four Color #1012 (July 1959)

== See also ==
- List of American films of 1959
