= The Diamond as Big as the Ritz =

1922 novella by F. Scott Fitzgerald

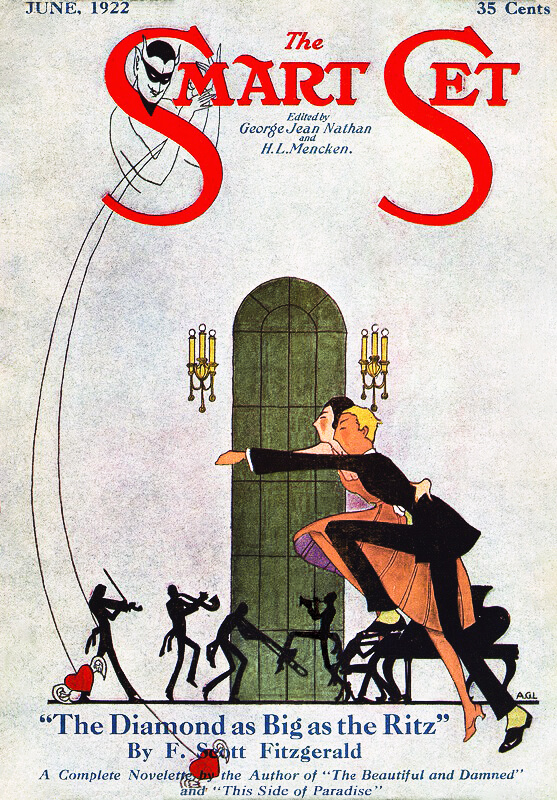
- Cover of the June 1922 issue of The Smart Set in which the story originally appeared.
- Author: F. Scott Fitzgerald
- Language: English
- Genre: Novella
- Publisher: The Smart Set
- Publication date: June 1922
- Publication place: United States
- Text: The Diamond as Big as the Ritz at Wikisource

The Diamond as Big as the Ritz is a novella by F. Scott Fitzgerald. It was first published in the June 1922 issue of The Smart Set magazine, and was included in Fitzgerald's 1922 short story collection Tales of the Jazz Age. Much of the story is set in Montana, a setting that may have been inspired by the summer that Fitzgerald spent near White Sulphur Springs, Montana in 1915.

== Plot summary ==
John T. Unger, a teenager from the Mississippi River town of Hades, is sent to a private boarding school near Boston. During the summer, he visits his classmates' homes, most of whom are from wealthy families.

In the middle of his sophomore year, a young man named Percy Washington is placed in Unger's dorm. He rarely speaks, and when he does, it is only to Unger. Percy invites Unger to his home for the summer, which he only describes as being "in the West." Unger accepts.

During the train ride Percy boasts that his father is "by far the richest man in the world", and boasts that his father "has a diamond bigger than the Ritz-Carlton Hotel."

Unger later learns that he is in Montana, in the "only five square miles of land in the country that's never been surveyed," and Percy's boasts prove true.

Percy's ancestry traces back to both George Washington and Lord Baltimore. His grandfather, Fitz-Norman Culpepper Washington, departed Virginia and headed west with his slaves to enter the sheep and cattle ranching business. However, on his claim he discovered not only a diamond mine, but a mountain consisting of one solid diamond.

Washington immediately finds himself in a quandary; the value of diamonds multiplied by the sheer number available for him to mine would make him the richest man ever to live, but, based on the economic law of supply, the sheer number of diamonds, if ever discovered by outsiders, would drive their value to near zero, thus making him a pauper.

He immediately hatches a plan, whereby his brother reads to the African-American slaves a fabricated proclamation by General Nathan Bedford Forrest that the South had defeated the North in the American Civil War, thus keeping them in perpetual slavery. Washington travels the world selling only a few diamonds at a time, in order to avoid flooding the market, but enough to give him enormous wealth.

Apart from enslaving people, the Washington family goes to further appalling lengths in order to keep their diamond a secret. The founder Fitz-Norman found it necessary to murder his own brother, who was "too fond of drinking" and might have betrayed the secret while drunk. Airmen who stray into the area are shot down, captured, and kept in a dungeon. People who visit are killed and their parents told that they have succumbed to an illness while staying there.

John falls in love with Percy's sister, Kismine, who accidentally lets slip that John too will be killed before he is allowed to leave. That night, airplanes launch an attack on the property, having been informed by an escaped Italian language teacher. Percy's father offers a bribe to God, "the greatest diamond in the world", but God, being the Owner of everything, naturally refuses. John, Kismine, and Jasmine, another sister, escape while Percy and his mother and father choose to blow up the mountain rather than leave it in the hands of others. Penniless, the three survivors are left to ponder their fate.

== Adaptations ==
Cover of a book of stories containing the novella.

The story was adapted as a radio play for the Orson Welles series This Is My Best in 1945, with Welles playing Braddock Washington. A different script adaptation was used three times on the radio program Escape between 1947 and 1949.

A teleplay version was broadcast on Kraft Theatre in 1955. The story's sisters, Kismine and Jasmine, were portrayed by Lee Remick and Elizabeth Montgomery, who were unknowns at 20 and 22 at the time.

The comic book Mickey Mouse No. 47 (Apr./May 1956) contains a retelling of Fitzgerald's story under the title "The Mystery of Diamond Mountain", scripted by William F. Nolan and Charles Beaumont and illustrated by Paul Murry.

Jimmy Buffett recounts the story in the song "Diamond As Big As The Ritz" from his 1995 album Barometer Soup.

Thomas Frank compared Fitzgerald’s story with Ayn Rand's novel Atlas Shrugged, published three decades later: both works depict a group of super-rich people establishing themselves in a secret hideaway at a distant valley in the Rocky Mountains. "There are several different plans floating around out there to launch a free-market hideaway named 'Galt's Gulch,' after the fictional place Ayn Rand’s fictional billionaires went to hide during their walkout.… In Ayn Rand's 1957 novel Atlas Shrugged, it's organized money versus the idiot pee-pul, only the moral poles are reversed, and the rich supermen masterminding the walkout are heroes rather than villains.… If a work of inspiring fiction is required, the utopians might consider F. Scott Fitzgerald's story, 'The Diamond as Big as the Ritz,' in which a Southern slave owner moves, Galt-like, to an uncharted valley in remotest Montana, convincing his human property that the Confederacy won the Civil War and thus, through a clever falsification of history, managing to keep them in bondage while he himself grows fabulously wealthy."

Science fiction author Jack Dann's 2001 novella "The Diamond Pit" is an homage to Fitzgerald's story.

== See also ==
- The Twenty-One Balloons
