= Frontier Gentleman =

Western radio series (1958)

- Genre: Western
- Running time: 30 minutes
- Country of origin: United States
- Language: English
- Home station: KNX
- Syndicates: CBS
- Starring: John Dehner
- Announcer: Johnny Jacobs; John Wald; Dan Cubberly; Bud Sewell
- Created by: Antony Ellis
- Written by: Antony Ellis
- Directed by: Antony Ellis
- Original release: February 2 – November 16, 1958

Frontier Gentleman is an American radio Western series originally broadcast on the Columbia Broadcasting System (CBS) radio network from February 2 to November 16, 1958, initially heard Sunday afternoons at 2:30 p.m. (Eastern Time) through March when it moved to 7 p.m.

== Format ==
Frontier Gentleman was one of several "adult westerns," along with Gunsmoke (1952–1961), Luke Slaughter of Tombstone and others, that appeared on radio and television in the early 1950s. The genre was described as "grittier, more realistic, and clearly intended for an older audience. Adult westerns were less the descendants of their juvenile predecessors than they were cousins of western feature films such as Shane (1953), with Alan Ladd and High Noon (1952), starring Gary Cooper"

The program was set in the post-Civil War United States.

== Opening ==
The program opened with a trumpet theme by Jerry Goldsmith and this introduction:

Herewith, an Englishman's account of life and death in The West. As a reporter for The Times of London, he writes his colorful and unusual accounts. But as a man with a gun, he lives and becomes a part of the violent years in the new territories. Now, starring John Dehner, this is the story of J. B. Kendall, Frontier Gentleman...

== Main character ==
The character's full name is Jeremy Brian Kendall. This was revealed in the episode "The Lost Mine." Kendall was described as an "elegant and icily effective ... veteran of the British Army in India."

== Personnel ==
Written, produced and directed by Antony Ellis, it followed the adventures of journalist Kendall as he roamed the Western United States in search of stories for the Times. Along the way, he encountered various fictional drifters and outlaws in addition to well-known historical figures, such as Jesse James, Calamity Jane and Wild Bill Hickok.

Music for the series was by Wilbur Hatch and Jerry Goldsmith, who also supplied the opening trumpet theme. The announcers were Dan Cubberly, Johnny Jacobs, Bud Sewell and John Wald.

Supporting cast: Harry Bartell, Lawrence Dobkin, Virginia Gregg, Stacy Harris, Johnny Jacobs, Joseph Kearns, Jack Kruschen, Jack Moyles, Jeanette Nolan (later also on television), Vic Perrin and Barney Phillips.

== Listen ==
- All episodes of *Frontier Gentleman* for free download at the Internet Archive
