= James Poe =

American screenwriter (1921–1980)

- Born: James Wilber Poe; October 4, 1921; Dobbs Ferry, New York, U.S.
- Died: January 24, 1980 (aged 58); Malibu, California, U.S.
- Occupation: Screenwriter
- Spouse: Barbara Steele (m. 1969; div. 1978)

James Wilber Poe (October 4, 1921 – January 24, 1980) was an American film and television screenwriter. He is best known for his work on such films as Around the World in 80 Days (for which he jointly won an Academy Award for Best Adapted Screenplay), Cat on a Hot Tin Roof, Summer and Smoke, Lilies of the Field, The Bedford Incident, and They Shoot Horses, Don't They?.

He also worked as a writer on the radio shows Escape and Suspense, writing the scripts for some of their best episodes, most notably "Three Skeleton Key", "Blood Bath" and "The Present Tense", all of which starred Vincent Price.

Poe was married to actress Barbara Steele from 1969 to 1978, having previously been married to the artist Barbara Poe Levee (née Reis) from 1943 to 1963.

== Career ==
Poe began his career at The March of Time, a newsreel production company. He moved to Hollywood in 1941. He wrote radio plays and documentaries before moving into feature films.

He had to sue for credit on Around the World in 80 Days.

In 1965 Poe signed a contract to direct films at Columbia but never directed.

== Select credits ==
- Close-Up (1948)
- Without Honor (1949)
- Scandal Sheet (1952)
- Paula (1952)
- A Slight Case of Larceny (1953)
- The Big Knife (1955)
- Around the World in 80 Days (1956)
- Attack! (1956)
- Hot Spell (1958)
- Cat on a Hot Tin Roof (1958)
- Goodyear Theatre – "Curtain Call" (1958)
- Last Train from Gun Hill (1959)
- Sanctuary (1961)
- Summer and Smoke (1961)
- The Dick Powell Theatre – "Crazy Sunday" (1962)
- Lilies of the Field (1963)
- Toys in the Attic (1963)
- Vacation Playhouse – "Come a Runnin'" (1963)
- Munroe (1963) (TV pilot)
- The Bedford Incident (1965)
- Riot (1969)
- They Shoot Horses, Don't They? (1969)
- Bracken's World – episode "Together Again, for the Last Time" (1970)
- The Gathering (1977)
- Enola Gay: The Men, the Mission, the Atomic Bomb (1980)
- The Nightman (1992)
