= Walter Newman (screenwriter) =

American screenwriter

Walter Brown Newman (11 February 1916 – 14 October 1993) was an American radio writer and screenwriter active from the late 1940s to the early 1990s. He was nominated three times for Academy Awards (Ace in the Hole, Cat Ballou, and Bloodbrothers), but he is best-known for a work that never made it to the screen: his unproduced original script Harrow Alley, which "has achieved legendary status in Hollywood."

Newman earned a bachelor's degree at New York University and studied law at Harvard University. After working as a publicist in New York and serving in the U.S. Army during World War II, he moved to Los Angeles and began writing radio dramas. Newman's radio writing included scripts for Escape, Suspense, and The Halls of Ivy as well as the first broadcast episode of Gunsmoke.

He is not officially credited for his screenplays for The Magnificent Seven and The Great Escape, having renounced credit after sharp disagreements with the director, John Sturges in both cases, over changes made during shooting when other dialogue rewriters were brought in.

Newman was born in New York City. He died in Sherman Oaks, California, a suburb of Los Angeles, on 14 October 1993.

== Select credits ==
- The Bigelow Theatre - "Big Hello" (1951)
- Ace in the Hole (1951)
- Suspense - "A Vision of Death" (1951)
- Gunsmoke (radio show) - pilot
- Underwater! (1955)
- The Man with the Golden Arm (1955)
- The True Story of Jesse James (1956)
- Westinghouse Desilu Playhouse - "The Crazy Hunter" (1958)
- Crime & Punishment, USA (1959)
- The Magnificent Seven (1960) - uncredited
- The Interns (1962)
- The Beachcomber (1962) - creator
- The Great Escape (1963) - uncredited
- The Richard Boone Show - "The Hooligan" (1964)
- Cat Ballou (1965)
- Marooned (1969) - original draft
- Bloodbrothers (1978)
- The Champ (1978)

=== Unproduced scripts ===
- Baggy Pants (1966)
- Cabbages and Kings (1967)
- Trial (1970)
- Harrow Alley (1970)
