= Alma Lawton =

Argentine-born Hollywood actress

- Born: Alma Drucilla Fleetwood Lawton; April 1921; Buenos Aires, Argentina
- Died: 24 February 1982 (aged 60); London, England
- Occupation: Actress
- Years active: 1947–1973
- Spouse: Ivan Donald Morrison (aka Donald Albert Fleetwood Lawton)

Alma Drucilla Fleetwood Lawton (April 1921 – 24 February 1982) was a Hollywood-based, Argentine-born actress who performed in films, on television, and on old-time radio.

== Early life and career ==
Born in Buenos Aires to English parents, Lawton appears to have spent her formative years divided primarily between Argentina and Chile. She was the younger of two children born to Alfred Edward Fleetwood Lawton, general manager of Cable & Wireless plc, and Alma Drucilla Fleetwood Lawton Sr. (aka the former Alma Drucilla Harris), herself a onetime music hall comedienne. Prior to beginning her radio career, Lawton reportedly performed in Great Britain, Australia and South America.

Evidently, the younger Lawton inherited her mother's diminutive stature, the latter having been described in 1912 as "the little British singing comedienne," while the former, at age 31, was dubbed "a diminutive redhead," who, aside from her "stage background in England and Australia," was "distinguished by her height of five feet [and] weigh[t of] 92 pounds." On the other hand, Joe Hyams of the Citizen-News, while likewise documenting Lawton's modest dimensions, adds that "[w]hat she lacks in size, Alma makes up for in talent, proving again that good things come in small packages."

On November 3, 1947, Lawton made her American radio debut on Lux Radio Theatre, in "Singapore," an original radio drama starring Fred MacMurray and Ava Gardner. Later that month, she costarred with Wally Maher in "Body Off Billingsgate" on The Whistler, and on December 8, she did another Lux episode, as part of a large ensemble supporting Robert Montgomery, Wanda Hendrix and Thomas Gomez, reprising their starring roles in Ride the Pink Horse.

The following spring, Lawton was tasked by Samuel Goldwyn with helping Teresa Wright achieve a reasonably authentic English accent.

== Radio ==
Date(s)	Program	Role	Notes
November 3, 1947	Lux Radio Theatre	N/A	Episode: "Singapore"
November 26, 1947	The Whistler	N/A	Episode: "The Body Off Billingsgate"
December 8, 1947	Lux Radio Theatre	N/A	Episode: "Ride the Pink Horse"
January 1, 1948	Family Theater	N/A	Episode: "In Another Year" (Hosted by J. Edgar Hoover, with Glen Langan and Ruth Hussey)
September 17, 1948	NBC University Theatre	N/A	Episode: "The Purloined Letter" (Edgar Allan Poe's story, with Adolphe Menjou)
October 31, 1948	NBC University Theatre	Ruth	Episode: "Justice" (With Nigel Bruce as Cokeson, and Ben Wright as Falder, in John Galsworthy's play, adapted by George Lefferts)
November 28, 1948	NBC University Theatre	N/A	Episode: "A Passage to India" (E. M. Forster's novel, adapted by George Lefferts)
January 23, 1949	NBC University Theatre	N/A	Episode: "The Ministry of Fear" (Graham Greene's novel, adapted by Ernest Kinoy)
April 24, 1949	NBC University Theatre	N/A	Episode: "The Way of All Flesh" (From Samuel Butler's novel, starring Tom Conway)
June 11, 1949	The Adventures of Philip Marlowe	N/A	Episode: "The Pigeon's Blood"
July 10, 1949	NBC University Theatre	Katherine	Episode: "Goodbye, Mr. Chips" (Co-starring with Herbert Marshall in Agnes Eckhardt's adaptation)
January 15, 1950	Errand of Mercy	N/A	Episode: "Quotation" (Starring Olan Soule)
January 29, 1950	NBC University Theatre	Lupe (in "Flowering Judas")	Episodes: "Flowering Judas" and "Pale Horse, Pale Rider"
March 25, 1950	NBC University Theatre	Margaret	Episode: "Howards End" (With Queenie Leonard, Terry Kilburn and Ben Wright)
May 21, 1950	NBC University Theatre	Naomi	Episode: "The House in Paris" (Adaptation of Elizabeth Bowen novel)
June 4, 1950	NBC University Theatre	N/A	Episode: "Gallions Reach"
August 20, 1950	NBC University Theatre	The Mother	Episode: "A High Wind in Jamaica" (Richard Hughes' novel, as adapted by Jane Speed)
January 11, 1951	Screen Guild Players	Dolly	Episode: "Brief Encounter" (Starring Stewart Granger and Deborah Kerr)
September 17, 1951	Suspense	N/A	Episode: "Neal Cream, Doctor of Poison" (Written by Antony Ellis, starring Charles Laughton)
May 9, 1952	NBC Presents: Short Story	Helen	Episode: "The Old General" (From Eric Knight's story, starring Ramsay Hill)
October 6, 1952	Suspense	Ellen	Episode: "The Diary of Dr. Pritchard" (Antony Ellis adapts William Roughead story, starring Sir Cedric Hardwicke)
February 8, 1953	Errand of Mercy	Janie	Episode: "H with a Southern Accent"
September 7, 1953	Lux Radio Theatre	Louise	Episode: "My Cousin Rachel" (With Olivia De Havilland, reprising her film role, while Lawton is promoted from "Mary Pascoe" to Rachel's romantic rival, Louise)
November 25, 1953	Crime Classics	N/A	Episode: "Killing Story Of William Corder And The Farmer's Daughter" (Morton Fine-David Friedkin script)

== Film and television ==
Year	Title	Role	Notes
1951	Lights Out (TV)	Dee Darrow	Episode: "The Fonceville Curse"
1951	Thunder on the Hill	Nurse Brent	
1951	Lady Possessed	Nurse	
1952	Ma and Pa Kettle on Vacation	N/A	
1952	My Cousin Rachel	Mary Pascoe	
1953	Hallmark Hall of Fame	N/A	Episode: "A Queen's Way"
1955	Lady Godiva of Coventry	Lady Yolanda	
1956	Gaby	English Girl	
1957	Sergeant Preston of the Yukon (TV)	Molly Andrews	Episode: "Blind Justice"
1957	Telephone Time (TV)	Teacher	Episode: "Parents of a Stranger" (Seen working with child for about 15 seconds at the 20:20 mark)
1957	Until They Sail	N/A	
1958	Alfred Hitchcock Presents (TV)	Alma	Season 4 Episode 9: "Murder Me Twice"
1959	The Jack Benny Program (TV)	Maid	Episode: "Autolight" (Gas Light parody, starring Benny and Barbara Stanwyck, featuring Lawton as one of the two maids; she is the first person seen as the curtain rises)
1959	One Step Beyond (TV)	Liz	Episode: "The Devil's Laughter"
1960	Peter Gunn (TV)	Supervisor	Episode: "See No Evil"
1960	Alcoa Theatre (TV)	N/A	Episode: "Chinese Finale"
1960	Midnight Lace	N/A	
1963	My Three Sons (TV)	N/A	Episode: "Scotch Broth"
1964	Mary Poppins	Mrs. Corry	
1964	My Fair Lady	Flower Girl	
1973	Emergency! (TV)	English Maid	Episode: "The Professor"

== Personal life ==
As of no later than April 1950, Lawton was married to fellow actor Donald Morrison. In May 1951, the couple had their names legally changed; hers, from Morrison back to Lawton, and his from Ivan Donald Morrison—which was, in fact, the Americanized version of his birth name, Isaac Morduchovitch—to Donald Albert Fleetwood Lawton. Donald Lawton died on October 18, 1990.

For a period, Lawton supported her parents financially. In 1953, she appeared with her parents in court in Los Angeles, California, as they sued her estranged brother Fleetwood Lawton, a news commentator, for financial support.
