= The Man Called X =

American radio espionage drama series (1944–1952)

- Genre: Spy drama
- Country of origin: United States
- Language: English
- Syndicates: CBS; NBC
- Starring: Herbert Marshall; Leon Belasco
- Announcer: Jack Latham; Wendell Niles
- Written by: Stephen Longstreet
- Directed by: William N. Robson
- Produced by: William N. Robson
- Original release: July 10, 1944 – May 20, 1952

The Man Called X is an espionage radio drama that aired on CBS and NBC from July 10, 1944, to May 20, 1952. The radio series was later adapted for television and was broadcast for one season, 1956–1957.

== People ==
Herbert Marshall had the lead role of agent Ken Thurston/"Mr. X", an American intelligence agent who took on dangerous cases in a variety of exotic locations. Leon Belasco played Mr. X's comedic sidekick, Pegon Zellschmidt, who always turned up in remote parts of the world because he had a "cousin" there. Zellschmidt annoyed and helped Mr. X.

Jack Latham was an announcer for the program, and Wendell Niles was the announcer from 1947 to 1948. Orchestras led by Milton Charles, Johnny Green, Felix Mills, and Gordon Jenkins supplied the background music. William N. Robson was the producer and director. Stephen Longstreet was the writer.

== Production ==
The Man Called X replaced America — Ceiling Unlimited on the CBS schedule in 1944. In 1946 it was the summer replacement for Bob Hope's program.

== Television ==
The series was later adapted to a 39-episode syndicated television series (1956–1957) starring Barry Sullivan as Thurston for Ziv Television.
