= Antony Ellis =

American writer, director, and producer (1920–1967)

Antony "Tony" Ellis (March 1, 1920 – September 26, 1967), born Antony Ellis Jacobs, was a writer, director, and producer of radio and television shows.

== Biography ==
Ellis was born in England on March 1, 1920. He later moved to the United States and became a naturalized American citizen.

=== Radio career ===
He began his entertainment career as an actor, but transitioned to writing. He was known for his radio scripts for the shows Escape, Suspense, Gunsmoke, Pursuit, and Romance, On Stage, Crime Classics, Hallmark Hall of Fame, and CBS Radio Workshop. He wrote, directed, and produced the well-regarded series Frontier Gentleman.

Variety wrote of the 1950 episode "A Sleeping Draft" for Suspense: "Scripter Ellis sustained chills via his suspenseful script".

When he took over running Suspense from Elliott Lewis, Ellis focused on science fiction rather than noir. He adapted Ray Bradbury stories for radio. He took over producing Escape for William Froug in 1956.

=== Television and film career ===
He produced and wrote for Zane Grey Theatre and Black Saddle. He was a producer of Michael Shayne. He wroteThe Monroes, A Man Called Shenandoah, and Arrest and Trial.

For television, Ellis wrote scripts for The Man from U.N.C.L.E. and four episodes of Gunsmoke.

His sole feature film screenplay was The Ride Back (1957). Variety's review said, "The unusual Antony Ellis yarn almost fails in the art house vein. With special handling the film conceivably could tape this field for favorable results. It's a simple story Ellis tells and under Allen H. Miner's leisurely direction it slowly unfolds in a fatalistic atmosphere".

Ellis was involved with the Writers Guild of America West. He was elected vice-president of the radio writers branch in 1954 and secretary-treasurer in 1958.

=== Personal life and death ===
Ellis was married to Georgia Ellis; they met while appearing at the Pasadena Playhouse. She played Miss Kitty in the Gunsmoke radio series. They had a son, Jonathan.

Ellis died of cancer on September 26, 1967, in Big Bear, California. He was survived by his wife, Janice Pickard Ellis; by his son from his marriage to Georgia Ellis; two daughters; brother; and mother.
