= John Dunkel =

American screenwriter

- Born: February 21, 1915; Springfield, Ohio, U.S.
- Died: February 22, 2001 (aged 86); North Hollywood, California, U.S.
- Education: Wittenberg University
- Occupation: Screenwriter
- Spouse: Claire Dunkel
- Children: 1

John Dunkel (February 21, 1915 – February 22, 2001) was an American screenwriter. In the 1930s he wrote for CBS Radio in Hollywood, California. Dunkel wrote for television programs including Gunsmoke, Bonanza, The Life and Legend of Wyatt Earp, Wagon Train, The Californians, The Virginian, Laramie, The Big Valley and Rawhide. He died in February 2001 of a heart attack in Los Angeles, California, at the age of 86.
