= Wilbur Hatch =

American composer (1902–1969)

- Wilbur Hatch and Desi Arnaz. Marco Rizo sits at the piano.
- Born: May 24, 1902; Mokena, Illinois, U.S.
- Died: December 22, 1969 (aged 67); Studio City, California, U.S.
- Occupation: Musical conductor
- Known for: Conducting orchestra on I Love Lucy

Wilbur Hatch (May 24, 1902 – December 22, 1969), was an American music composer who worked primarily in radio and television. He was born in Mokena, Illinois, and died in Studio City, California.

== Radio ==
Hatch began working in radio in 1922 as a pianist on KYW (Chicago). In 1930 he became director of music on KNX in Los Angeles, California, and on CBS, where he created music for such radio shows as Hawk Durango, The General Electric Theater, Frontier Gentleman, December Bride, Young Love, Your Home Front Reporter, The Screen Guild Theater, The Whistler, Suspense, Meet Corliss Archer, My Favorite Husband, Broadway Is My Beat, and Our Miss Brooks.

Hatch also worked as a conductor and music director for CBS. During the late 1930s and early 1940s he was conductor on The Campbell Soup Radio Show. He was the musical director and composed the theme for CBS Radio's The Whistler (1942–55). Additionally, he was the musical director for CBS Radio's Broadway Is My Beat (1949–54), Mayor of the Town and Luke Slaughter of Tombstone (1958).

== Television ==
Hatch's most lasting on-screen television credit was for composing some of the music and conducting the Desi Arnaz Orchestra on I Love Lucy. (In Season #1 Episode #30 "Lucy Does a TV Commercial" as Ricky is about to sing, he calls offstage "Mr. Hatch, if you please.") He was the sole composer for three episodes of I Love Lucy (1951–56), four episodes of The Lucy–Desi Comedy Hour (1959–60), all 156 episodes of The Lucy Show (1962–68) and all of the Here's Lucy (1968–69) episodes up to the time of his death. He also conceived and conducted the music for the TV versions of Our Miss Brooks and December Bride, as well as its spin-off, Pete and Gladys. He also composed music for The Mothers-in-Law. Until the time of his death Hatch was resident musical director of Desilu Studios, and his work included music director on Star Trek, The Untouchables, and other Desilu productions. In 1970, after Hatch had died, Marl Young (1917–2009) became the resident music composer for Lucille Ball Productions, Inc. (including the Here's Lucy series until it finished in 1974). He composed and conducted the music for season 3 episode 11 of The Twilight Zone – "Still Valley". As the title credits appear a couple of short musical phrases are reminiscent of the Star Trek theme music.

== Other professional activities ==
Hatch was a member of the executive board of the Composers Guild of America.

== Personal life ==
Hatch attended the University of Chicago to study engineering, but music fully occupied his life. One of the highlights of his college education was that he wrote the music for the annual Blackfriar's show, the University's dramatic organization. Hatch graduated from the University of Chicago in 1922 with a degree in chemical engineering, with High Honors, and a Phi Beta Kappa Key.

Hatch was married to Margaret Mathews of Grinnell, Iowa. They had three children: Robert Allen (born in 1932), Nancy Margaret (born in 1934) and Margaret Ann (born in 1944). Hatch is buried at Mountain View Cemetery in Altadena, California.
