= William N. Robson =

American radio director

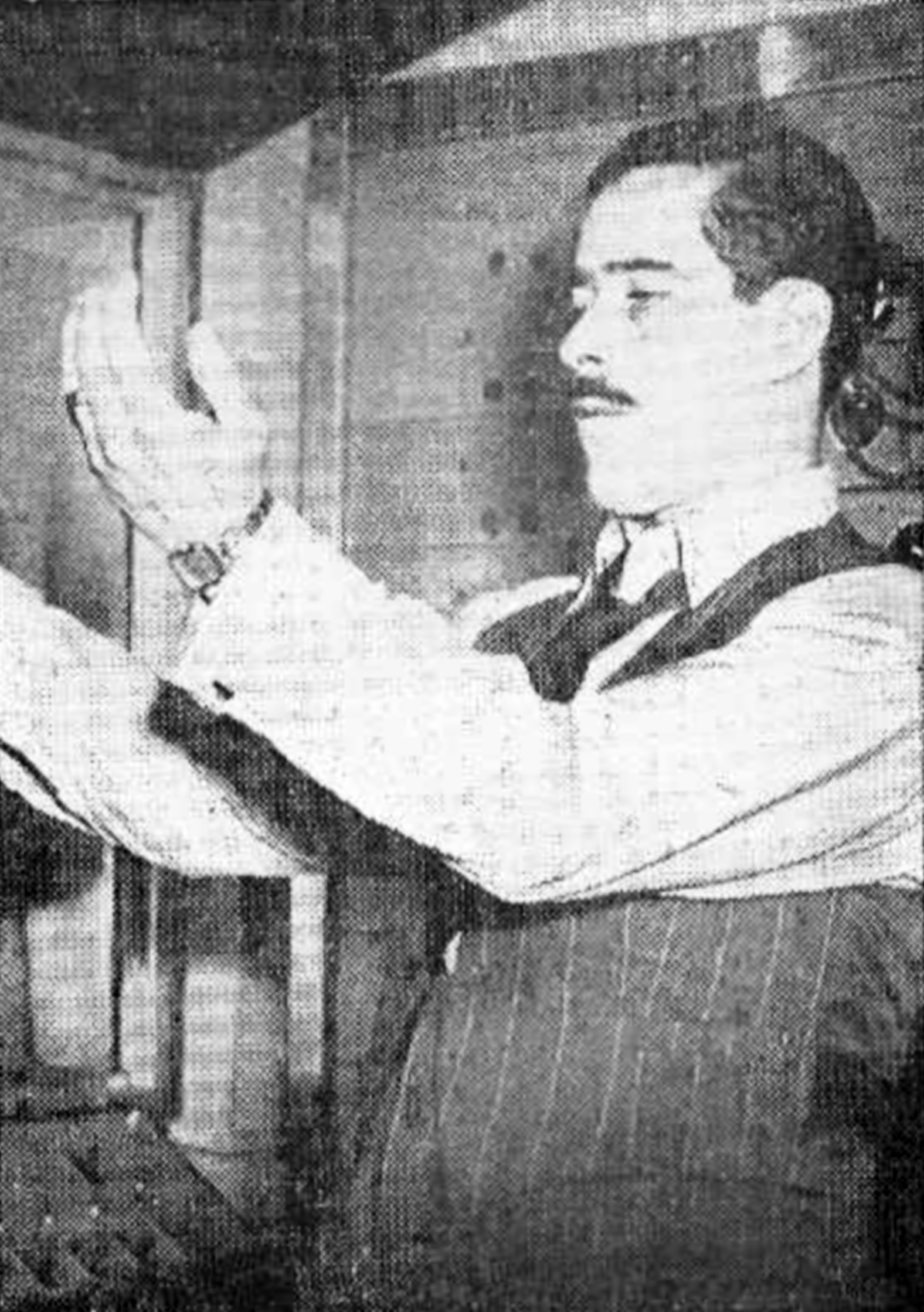
- Born: William N. Robson II; October 8, 1906; Pittsburgh, Pennsylvania
- Died: April 10, 1995 (aged 88); Alexandria, Virginia
- Occupations: Radio director and producer

William N. Robson (October 8, 1906 – April 10, 1995) was an American director and producer of radio programs.

== Early life ==
Robson was born William N. Robson II in Pittsburgh, Pennsylvania, the son of William N. Robson and Gertrude Brehm Robson. His father handled public relations for the Loyal Order of Moose and was described in a newspaper article as being "known from coast to coast." He was involved in entertainment as early as age 9, when a newspaper article about a 1916 amateur production in Pittsburgh reported, "Little Bill Robson has six parts in the show ... "

Robson graduated from Allegheny High School and attended the University of Pittsburgh for two years in 1923, leaving the school to become a reporter for the Pittsburgh Post. He attended Yale University, graduating in 1928.

In the 1920s, Robson had his own musical group, Bill Robson and His Yale Music. In the summers of 1926, 1927, and 1928, the group toured Europe, performing in Paris, Vienna, and Berlin, among other cities.

Robson was the screenwriter for the 1933 Paramount Pictures film Private Jones. He worked as an associate producer at Paramount for three years.

== Radio career ==
Robson spent most of his career involved with radio. His radio debut came in 1936 as director of Big Town. He succeeded Irving Reis as head of the Columbia Workshop.

Perhaps the most notable of Robson's productions was Suspense, followed closely by the similarly formatted Escape. Suspense lasted more than two decades on the air with more than 900 episodes broadcast. Ronald L. Smith wrote about Suspense and Escape in his book, Horror Stars on Radio: The Broadcast Histories of 29 Chilling Hollywood Voices: "Both used the same format: a challenging (if anonymous) host introducing a story of murder or perhaps classic horror. Robson favored adaptations of anything from Poe tales to a good yarn in the latest issue of Esquire magazine."

Robson's roles in other radio programs included those shown in the table below.

Program	Role(s)
Calling All Cars	Producer and writer
Christopher London	Producer
Columbia Workshop	Director
Doorway to Life	Producer, director, and writer
Hawk Larabee	Producer and director
Luke Slaughter of Tombstone	Producer, director, and writer
The Man Behind the Gun	Producer
The Man Called X	Director
Pursuit	Producer and director
Request Performance	Producer and director
The Saint	Producer and director
Shorty Bell	Producer
Stars in the Afternoon	Director
T-Man	Producer and director

Robson left CBS in 1939 to become director of an advertising firm's radio department, and after the United States entered World War II he helped to prepare broadcasts for the Office of Emergency Management and the War Production Board. He returned to CBS in May 1942 to help the network prepare programs related to the war.

== Accusations of communist sympathies ==
On June 22, 1950, a pamphlet called Red Channels appeared, focusing on the field of broadcasting. Robson was among 151 entertainment industry professionals (erroneously) named in the context of "Red Fascists and their sympathizers".

Eric Barnouw's A History of Broadcasting in the United States: Volume 2: The Golden Web: 1933 to 1953 summarized the accusations against Robson as follows:

The Red Channels listing for Robson contained four items. It said that (1) in 1942, he had been sponsor of an Artists Front to Win the War organized at a meeting in Carnegie Hall (2) in December 1946, he had made a speech in Los Angeles, protesting encroachments on freedom of expression; (3) in 1948, he had signed with other artists a "We Are For [Progressive Party candidate Henry] Wallace" advertisement in the New York Times.(4) he was listed as an "associate" on the masthead of the Hollywood Quarterly, a scholarly journal of film, radio, and television published by the University of California Press.

This guilt-by-association would affect Robson's career over the next decade.

== Television ==
Robson was the producer of Sure as Fate, a mystery series that debuted on CBS in the summer of 1950. The listing in Red Channels took its toll, however, resulting in his replacement as producer (although he was paid for the full length of his contract). During the hiatus, he used a pseudonym as a writer for the television version of Suspense (U.S. TV series). Even that activity ceased, however, after "he was told that orders from CBS headquarters in New York had forbidden further assignments to him."

During the 1950s, he wrote television dramas. In 1961, he joined the Voice of America where he produced documentaries, among them New York, New York on which Garry Moore interviewed celebrities visiting the city, and 200 Years Ago Tonight, a series about the American Revolutionary War produced during the bicentennial year of 1976. His time at the VOA won him four additional Peabody Awards.

== Recognition ==
Three of Robson's radio works received George Foster Peabody Awards:

- 1942 – "The Man Behind the Gun" for Outstanding Entertainment in Drama
- 1943 – "An Open Letter to the American People" for Outstanding Entertainment in Drama
- 1975 – Two Hundred Years Ago Tonight

== Later life ==
With regard to his radio career, Robson would enthusiastically reflect to Dick Bertell in 1976: "The great period of radio was from 1937, '38 really, through the war. It was only 7 years—the golden age of radio. 'Suspense' and 'Escape'—those are the things one does later because one has all the skills at his fingertips. At this time we were trying to find out how to do it ... We were learning skills, we were sharpening and honing our abilities ... when Irving Reis did The Fall of the City in the spring of '37 [it was written] by Archibald MacLeish—one of America's outstanding poets—a man who was so impressed by the medium of radio that he submitted to Irving Reis and the Columbia Workshop a first play for radio. And who directed that? Irving Reis with all of the director staff of CBS assisting him. Earle McGill, Brewster Morgan, myself, Bill Spier all assisting. Orson Welles as narrator, Burgess Meredith as chief orator. Names that we conjure with now that were just kids then, just kids. That was the time."

== Death ==
Robson died at his home in Alexandria, Virginia, from complications of Alzheimer's disease. He was survived by his wife, Shirley; three sons; and one grandson.

== See also ==
- Columbia Workshop
