= Harry Bartell =

American actor and announcer (1913–2004)

- Born: November 29, 1913; New Orleans, Louisiana, U.S.
- Died: February 26, 2004 (aged 90); Ashland, Oregon, U.S.
- Occupation: Actor
- Years active: 1933–2003

Harry Alfred Bartell (November 29, 1913 – February 26, 2004) was an American actor and announcer in radio, television and film. With his rather youthful sounding voice, Bartell was one of the busiest West Coast character actors from the early 1940s until the end of network radio drama in the 1960s.

== Early years ==
Bartell was born in New Orleans, Louisiana in 1913. In 1942, he joined the staff of KWKW radio as an announcer.

== Radio ==
Upon moving to California, Bartell became a favorite of producer/director Norman MacDonnell, performing frequently on Escape (notably as Ronald Dawson in The Second Class Passenger, Peyton Farquar in Ambrose Bierce's An Occurrence at Owl Creek Bridge, and Alcine in "Operation Fleur De Lys"), and was a leading member of the Gunsmoke repertory company. Bartell was with the latter series from the first broadcast on April 26, 1952, until the last show on June 18, 1961; his roles ranged from friendly townspeople to victims to heavies, from the occasional role of Dodge City printer Mr. Hightower to famed gunslinger Doc Holliday in a 1952 episode. With fellow actor Vic Perrin, he also co-wrote two episodes near the end of the radio run, and appeared many times on the TV version of Gunsmoke, sometimes reprising his radio roles.

Bartell worked on other radio Westerns such as The Six Shooter, Frontier Gentleman, Have Gun Will Travel, and Fort Laramie (a regular as Lt. Seiberts). Other recurring radio parts included a stint as one of several actors to play Archie Goodwin in The New Adventures of Nero Wolfe starring Sydney Greenstreet, Tommy Brooks on the situation comedy The Charlotte Greenwood Show, and Officer Ed Miller on Rogers of the Gazette. As an announcer, he was heard on The New Adventures of Sherlock Holmes for several years, interviewing Dr. Watson and segueing into commercials for Petri Wine (he also announced on Silver Theater in the 1940s and on the radio version of Dear Abby from 1960 until 1972).

Other radio acting jobs included multiple roles in Norman Corwin's VE Day special On a Note of Triumph, frequent appearances on Jack Webb's shows Dragnet and Pete Kelly's Blues, and episodic parts on The Modern Adventures of Casanova (starring Errol Flynn), My Favorite Husband, The Saint, Suspense, and Lux Radio Theatre. He was a member of the stock company of the detective series Yours Truly, Johnny Dollar, playing characters on both sides of the law, as well as the recurring role of jittery insurance adjuster Harry Branson (and his equally fussy twin brother Peter Branson).

His final radio appearance was on Seattle radio producer Jim French's series The Further Adventures of Sherlock Holmes, guest starring as a blustery American publisher in an August 2003 episode.

== Television ==
In films and television, Bartell's youthful voice was revealed to come from a silver-haired figure. His TV appearances included guest roles on Get Smart, Gunsmoke (as S2E24’s title character “Cain Vestal” in 1957 & S10E24’s “Honey Pot” as Sheriff James Riley in 1965), I Love Lucy, The Wild Wild West, The Untouchables, The Fugitive, and The Twilight Zone, in addition to the television versions of Gunsmoke and Dragnet (reprising his radio role of Father Rojas in Christmas episodes of the 1951, 1967, and 1970 series). He played Sheriff Quinn in Have Gun Will Travel S1 E26 "Birds of a Feather" which aired 3/7/1958.

== Film ==
Bartell's films included Voice in the Mirror, Johnny Concho, the 1954 Dragnet movie and an unbilled part in Howard Hawks' Monkey Business.

== Personal life ==
Apart from his acting work, Bartell was an active photographer (many of his photos of the Gunsmoke cast appeared in the 1990 book on the series Gunsmoke: A Complete History). In his last years, he was a frequent presence at old-time radio conventions and recreations, wrote online articles about the medium and his experiences, and even participated in radio-themed chat rooms. He was married to Beverly Householder.

== Death ==
On February 26, 2004, Bartell died in Ashland, Oregon. He was 90 years old. He was cremated and his ashes returned to his family in residence.
