= The Drums of the Fore and Aft =

Fictional regiment and story by Rudyard Kipling

"The Drums of the Fore and Aft" is a story by Rudyard Kipling.

The "Fore and Aft" Regiment is the nickname of the fictional "The Fore and Fit Princess Hohenzollern-Sigmaringen-Anspach's Merther-Tydfilshire Own Royal Loyal Light Infantry, Regimental District 329A." described in the story.

== "The Drums of the Fore and Aft" ==
The story concerns an inexperienced Regular battalion on overseas service brigaded with a Highland Regiment and a Gurkha Regiment in Afghanistan. Unlike Kipling's other tales, it concerns the disgrace of a battle almost lost rather than the glory of a battle won.

The main characters (the "Drums" of the title) are Jakin and Lew, a pair of delinquent drummer boys serving with the Regimental Band. Scrawny Jakin is an orphan, while fat-faced "Piggy" Lew is either a "line boy" (soldier's son) or a volunteer. They are always getting written up for swearing, drinking, smoking, and fighting (the latter charge just as often against all comers as between themselves) and are disliked by the other drummers. Despite their reputations, they manage to get sent on campaign by personally fast-talking the colonel.

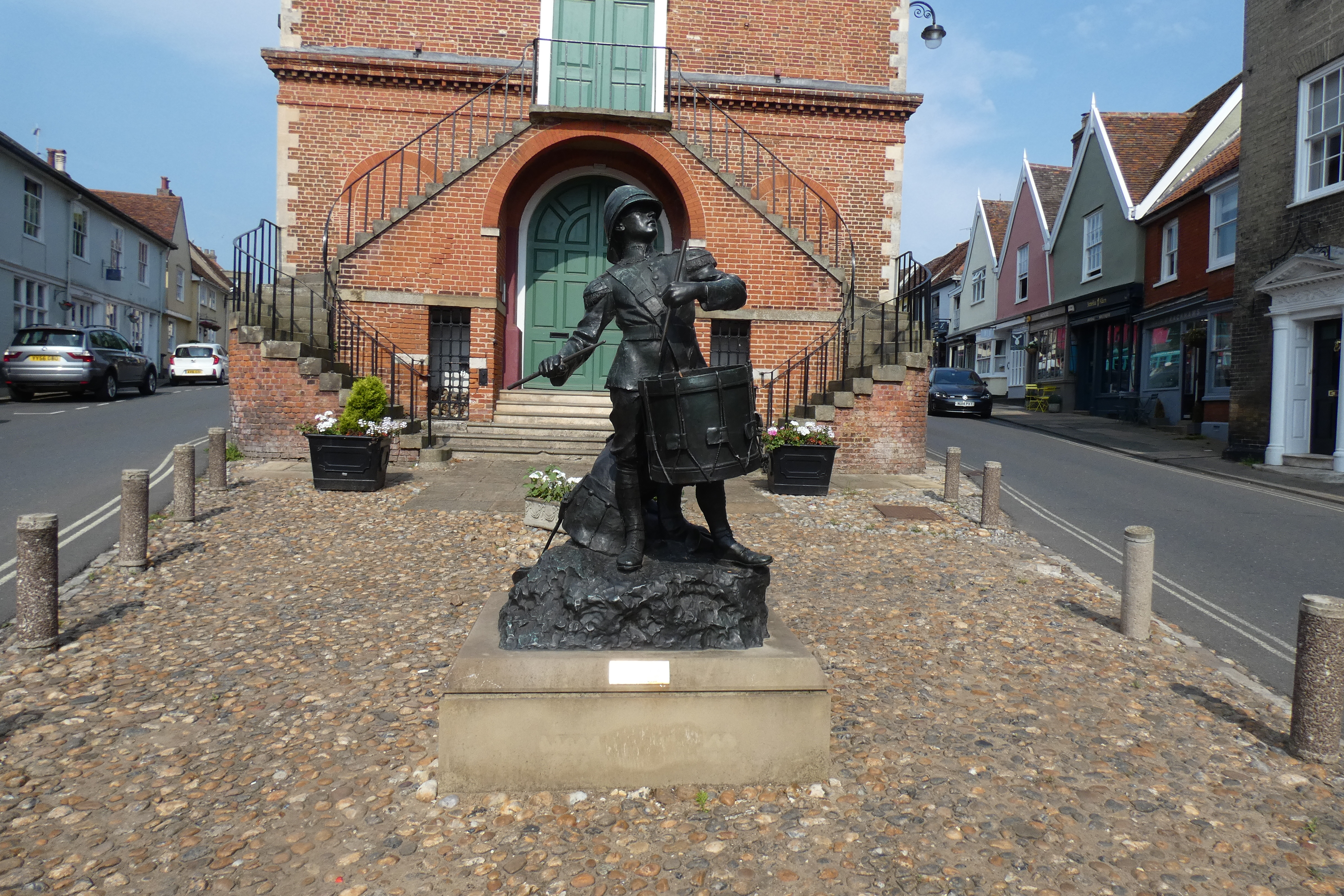
Drums of the Fore and Aft at Woodbridge, Suffolk, sculpture by Arnold Keppel, 8th Earl of Albemarle.

In Afghanistan, the unit has a terrible time adjusting to the climate and the rigors of campaign life. The men are also set on edge by the death of a private by sniper fire. On the day of the battle they take the center position between the Highlanders and the Ghurkhas. Their inexperience causes them to blunder and allows the enemy to close with them in hand-to-hand combat. They break and begin to retreat; the young officers of one company try to rally the men but are left behind to be slaughtered by the advancing Ghazi warriors.

The boys, fortified with drink, try to rally the regiment by playing the tune "British Grenadiers" and marching back and forth before the enemy. Shamed and encouraged by the boys' bravery, they return to the attack. Before they can be reached, the boys are killed in the first volley of Afghan fire and are slain. The rallied and enraged troops rout the enemy and help win the battle, but are shunned by the rest of the Brigade for their earlier actions.

== Inspirations ==
The real-life basis for the "Fore and Aft" Regiment might be a nickname of the Gloucestershire Regiment, which has a cap badge on the front and back of its headdress. This is a battle honour earned when the regiment faced off two forces of enemy French troops at the Battle of the Nile by standing its companies back-to-back. Kipling was probably playing cute by using a real regiment's nickname to provide realism but giving it a cover name to prevent embarrassing the real regiment.

The story might be referring to the 2nd Anglo-Afghan War (1878–1880), in which the devastating Battle of Maiwand occurred.

A variation of this regimental name is the Queens Own Royal Loyal Light Infantry-former regiment of Peachy Carnehan and Daniel Dravot in 1975 movie version of Kiplings's The Man Who Would Be King.

== Illustrations from Soldier Tales (1896) ==
Illustrations by Archibald Standish Hartrick from the first edition of Soldier Tales (1896), a collected volume of Kipling's stories.

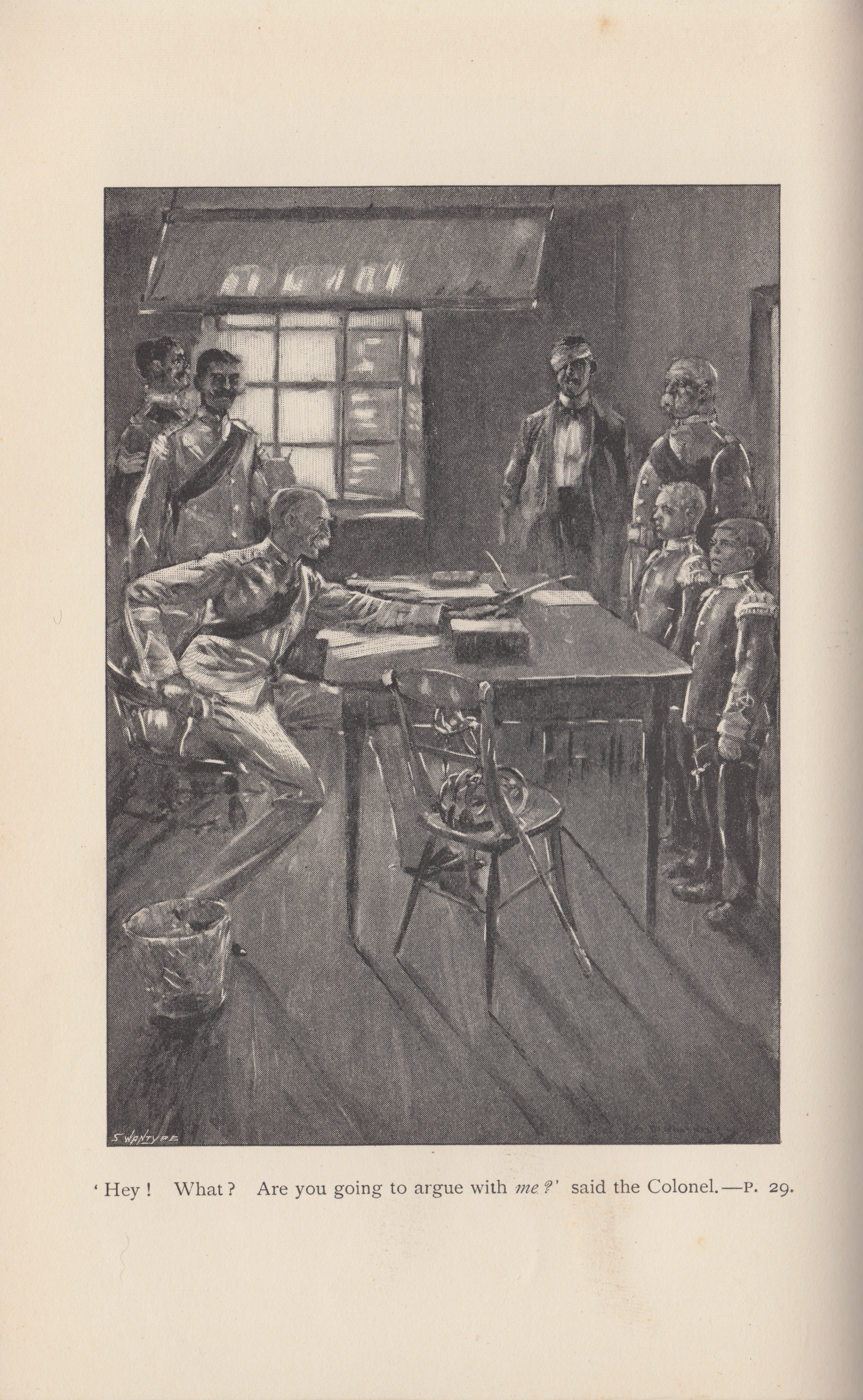
'Hey! What? Are you going to argue with me?' said the Colonel.

Cris slid an arm round his neck.

The men strolled across the tracks to inspect the Afghan prisoners.

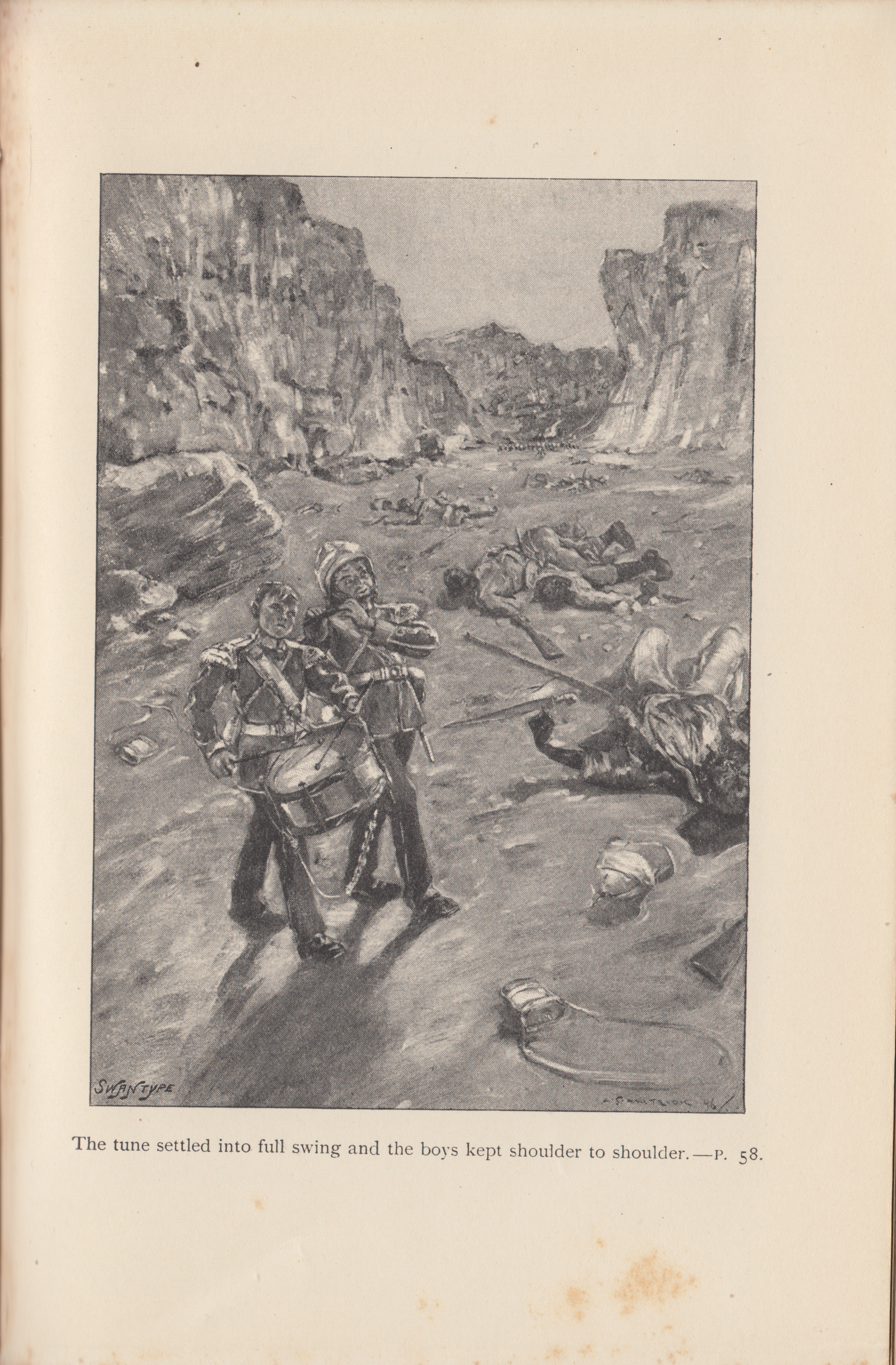
The tune settled into full swing and the boys kept shoulder to shoulder.
