= Suspense (radio drama) =

Radio drama series (1940 to 1962)

- Lurene Tuttle (left) and Rosalind Russell in "The Sisters" on Suspense (1948)
- Genre: Drama and suspense
- Running time: 30 minutes or one hour
- Country of origin: United States
- Language: English
- Home station: CBS Radio Network
- Written by: John Dickson Carr, Lucille Fletcher, Sigmund Miller, E. Jack Neuman, Walter Newman, Louis Pelletier, Hugh Pentecost, James Poe, Robert L. Richards, Larry Roman, John Shaw, Robert Tallman, George Wells, J. Donald Wilson, Mel Dinelli
- Directed by: Ted Bliss, John Dietz, Fred Hendrickson, Anton Leader, Elliott Lewis, Norman Macdonnell, William N. Robson, Robert Lewis Shayon, Charles Vanda, Bruno Zirato Jr.
- Produced by: Norman Macdonnell, William Spier, William N. Robson, Bruno Zirato Jr.
- Original release: June 17, 1942 – September 30, 1962
- No. of episodes: 946

Suspense is a radio drama series broadcast on CBS Radio from 1940 through 1962.

One of the premier drama programs of the Golden Age of Radio, it was subtitled "radio's outstanding theater of thrills" and focused on suspense thriller-type scripts, usually featuring leading Hollywood actors of the era. Approximately 945 episodes were broadcast during its long run, and more than 900 still exist.

Suspense went through several major phases, characterized by different hosts, sponsors, and director/producers. Formula plot devices were followed for all but a handful of episodes: the protagonist was usually a normal person suddenly dropped into a threatening or bizarre situation; solutions were "withheld until the last possible second"; and evildoers were usually punished in the end.

In its early years, the program made only occasional forays into science fiction and fantasy. Notable exceptions include adaptations of Curt Siodmak's Donovan's Brain and H. P. Lovecraft's "The Dunwich Horror", but by the late 1950s, such material was regularly featured.

== Alfred Hitchcock ==
Alfred Hitchcock directed its audition show (for the CBS summer series Forecast). This was an adaptation of The Lodger a story Hitchcock had filmed in 1926 with Ivor Novello. Martin Grams Jr., author of Suspense: Twenty Years of Thrills and Chills, described the Forecast origin of Suspense:

On the second presentation of July 22, 1940, Forecast offered a mystery/horror show titled Suspense. With the co-operation of his producer, Walter Wanger, Alfred Hitchcock received the honor of directing his first radio show for the American public. The condition agreed upon for Hitchcock's appearance was that CBS make a pitch to the listening audience about his and Wanger's latest film, Foreign Correspondent. To add flavor to the deal, Wanger threw in Edmund Gwenn and Herbert Marshall as part of the package. All three men (including Hitch) would be seen in the upcoming film, which was due for a theatrical release the next month. Both Marshall and Hitchcock decided on the same story to bring to the airwaves, which happened to be a favorite of both of them: Marie Belloc Lowndes' "The Lodger." Alfred Hitchcock had filmed this story for Gainsborough in 1926, and since then it had remained as one of his favorites.

Herbert Marshall portrayed the mysterious lodger, and co-starring with him were Edmund Gwenn and character actress Lurene Tuttle as the rooming-house keepers who start to suspect that their new boarder might be the notorious Jack-the-Ripper. [Gwenn was actually repeating the role taken in the 1926 film by his brother, Arthur Chesney. And Tuttle would work again with Hitchcock nearly 20 years later, playing Mrs. Al Chambers, the sheriff's wife, in Psycho.] Character actor Joseph Kearns also had a small part in the drama, and Wilbur Hatch, head musician for CBS Radio at the time, composed and conducted the music specially for the program. Adapting the script to radio was not a great technical challenge for Hitchcock, and he cleverly decided to hold back the ending of the story from the listening audience in order to keep them in suspense themselves. This way, if the audience's curiosity got the better of them, they would write in to the network to find out whether the mysterious lodger was in fact Jack the Ripper. For the next few weeks, hundreds of letters came in from faithful listeners asking how the story ended. Actually a few wrote threats claiming that it was "indecent" and "immoral" to present such a production without giving the solution

== 1942–1962 ==
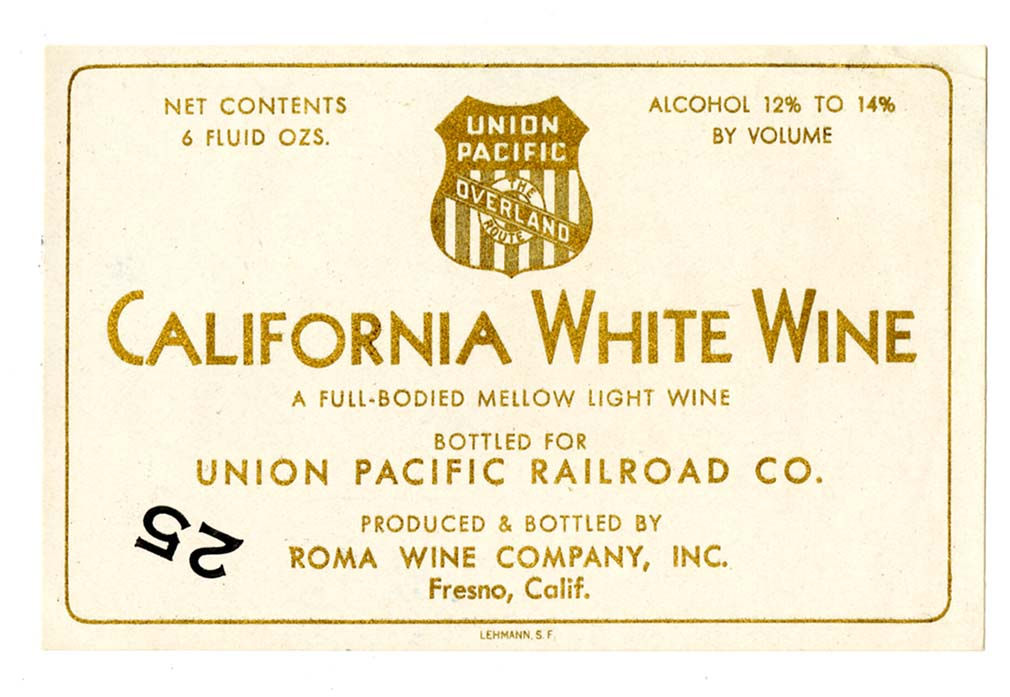
Wine label, Roma Wine Company, bottled for Union Pacific Railroad circa 1940s

In the earliest years, the program was hosted by "The Man in Black" (played by Joseph Kearns or Ted Osborne) with many episodes written or adapted by the prominent mystery author John Dickson Carr.

One of the series' earliest successes and its single most popular episode is Lucille Fletcher's "Sorry, Wrong Number", about a bedridden woman (Agnes Moorehead) who panics after overhearing a murder plot on a crossed telephone connection but is unable to persuade anyone to investigate. First broadcast on May 25, 1943, it was restaged seven times (last on February 14, 1960), each time with Moorehead. The popularity of the episode led to a film adaptation in 1948. Another notable early episode was Fletcher's "The Hitch Hiker" (aired September 2, 1942), in which a motorist (Orson Welles) is stalked on a cross-country trip by a nondescript man who keeps appearing on the side of the road; this episode had originally been performed on The Orson Welles Show the previous year, and was later adapted for television by Rod Serling as a 1960 episode of The Twilight Zone.

After the network sustained the program during its first two years, the sponsor became Roma Wines (1944–1947) by Roma Wine Company, and then (after another brief period of sustained hour-long episodes, initially featuring Robert Montgomery as host and "producer" in early 1948), Autolite Spark Plugs (1948–1954); eventually Harlow Wilcox (of Fibber McGee and Molly) became the pitchman. William Spier, Norman Macdonnell and Anton M. Leader were among the producers and directors.

Suspense received a Special Citation of Honor Peabody Award for 1946.

Second issue of the 1946 magazine tie-in

The program's heyday was in the early 1950s, when radio actor, producer and director Elliott Lewis took over (still during the Wilcox/Autolite run). Here the material reached new levels of sophistication. The writing was taut, and the casting, which had always been a strong point of the series (featuring such film stars as Orson Welles, Joseph Cotten, Henry Fonda, Humphrey Bogart, Judy Garland, Ronald Colman, Marlene Dietrich, Eve McVeagh, Lena Horne, and Cary Grant), took an unexpected turn when Lewis expanded the repertory to include many of radio's famous drama and comedy stars such as Jack Benny or Jim and Marian Jordan, often playing against type.

The highest production values enhanced Suspense, and many of the shows retain their power to grip and entertain. At the time he took over Suspense, Lewis was familiar to radio fans for playing Frankie Remley, the wastrel guitar-playing sidekick to Phil Harris in The Phil Harris-Alice Faye Show. On the May 10, 1951 Suspense, Lewis reversed the roles with "Death on My Hands": a bandleader (Harris) is horrified when an autograph-seeking fan accidentally shoots herself and dies in his hotel room, and a vocalist (Faye) tries to help him as the townfolk call for vigilante justice against him.

With the rise of television and the departures of Lewis and Autolite, subsequent producers (Antony Ellis, William N. Robson and others) struggled to maintain the series due to shrinking budgets, the availability of fewer name actors, and listenership decline. To save money, the program frequently used scripts first broadcast by another noteworthy CBS anthology, Escape. In addition to these tales of exotic adventure, Suspense expanded its repertoire to include more science fiction and supernatural content. By the end of its run, the series was remaking scripts from the long-canceled program The Mysterious Traveler. A time travel tale like Robert Arthur's "The Man Who Went Back to Save Lincoln" or a thriller about a death ray-wielding mad scientist would alternate with more run-of-the-mill crime dramas.

The series expanded to television with the Suspense series on CBS from 1949 to 1954, and again in 1962. The radio series had a tie-in with Suspense magazine which published four 1946–47 issues edited by Leslie Charteris.

The final broadcasts of Yours Truly, Johnny Dollar and Suspense, ending at 7:00 pm Eastern Time on September 30, 1962, are often cited as the end of the Golden Age of Radio. The final episode of Suspense was Devilstone, starring Christopher Carey and Neal Fitzgerald. It was sponsored by Parliament cigarettes.

== Opening introductions ==
There were several variations of program introductions. A typical early opening is this from April 27, 1943:

(MUSIC ... BERNARD HERRMANN'S SUSPENSE THEME ... CONTINUES IN BG)

THE MAN IN BLACK: Suspense!

This is The Man in Black, here again to introduce Columbia's program, Suspense.

Our stars tonight are Miss Agnes Moorehead and Mr. Ray Collins. You've seen these two expert and resourceful players in "Citizen Kane" – "The Magnificent Ambersons" in which Miss Moorehead's performance won her the 1942 Film Critics' Award. Mr. Collins will soon be seen in the Metro-Goldwyn-Mayer Technicolor film, "Salute to the Marines."

Miss Moorehead and Mr. Collins return this evening to their first love, the CBS microphone, to appear in a study in terror by Lucille Fletcher called "The Diary of Sophronia Winters."

The story told by this diary is tonight's tale of... suspense. If you've been with us on these Tuesday nights, you will know that Suspense is compounded of mystery and suspicion and dangerous adventure. In this series are tales calculated to intrigue you, to stir your nerves, to offer you a precarious situation and then withhold the solution... until the last possible moment. And so it is with "The Diary of Sophronia Winters" and the performances of Agnes Moorehead and Ray Collins, we again hope to keep you in...

(MUSIC: ... UP, DRAMATICALLY)

THE MAN IN BLACK: ... Suspense!

== Recognition ==
Suspense was inducted into the National Radio Hall of Fame in 2011.

Since 2007, Radio Classics (Sirius XM channel 148) has been airing episodes of Suspense. The show is also streamed Sunday night's at 7 pm Pacific time on kusaradio.com from the original masters.

== Satire ==
The familiar opening phrase "tales well-calculated to..." was satirized by Mad as the cover blurb "Tales Calculated to Drive You... Mad" on its first issue (October–November 1952) and continuing until issue #23 (May 1955).

Radio comedians Bob and Ray had a recurring routine lampooning the show called "Anxiety." Their character Commander Neville Putney told stories that were presented as dramatic but were intentionally mundane, with the opening line "A tale well designed to keep you in... Anxiety."

In the “Chicken Heart” sketch on his Wonderfulness album Bill Cosby relates radio programs during his youth “that were scary.” One is Suspense.

== Theater ==
For PowPAC, San Diego actor-director Robert Hitchcox mounted a 2006 stage production recreating two episodes of Suspense, complete with commercials, in a stage set designed like a CBS radio studio.

== Partial list of episodes of Suspense ==
=== 1940 ===
Date	Title	Star(s)
July 22	"The Lodger"	Herbert Marshall and Edmund Gwenn (Audition program)

=== 1942 ===
Date	Title	Star(s)
June 17	"The Burning Court"	Charlie Ruggles
June 24	"Wet Saturday"	Clarence Derwent
August 19	"The Cave of Ali Baba"	Romney Brent
September 2	"The Hitch-Hiker"	Orson Welles
September 16	"The Kettler Method"	Roger Dekoven, John Gibson, Gloria Stuart
September 23	"A Passage to Benares"	Paul Stewart
September 30	"One Hundred in the Dark"	Eric Dressler and Alice Frost
October 27	"The Lord of the Witch Doctors"	Nicholas Joy
November 3	"The Devil in the Summer House"	Martin Gabel
November 10	"Will You Make a Bet with Death?"	Michael Fitzmaurice
November 17	"Menace in Wax"	Joe Julian
November 24	"The Body Snatchers"	E. G. Marshall
December 1	"The Bride Vanishes"	Hanley Stafford, Lesley Woods
December 15	"Till Death Do Us Part"	Peter Lorre, Alice Frost
December 22	"Two Sharp Knives"	Stuart Erwin

=== 1943 ===
Date	Title	Star(s)
January 5	"Nothing Up My Sleeve"	Elissa Landi
January 12	"The Pit and The Pendulum"	Henry Hull
February 2	"The Doctor Prescribed Death"	Bela Lugosi
February 16	"In Fear and Trembling"	Mary Astor
June 22	"The Man without a Body"	John Sutton, George Zucco
July 6	"The White Rose Murders"	Maureen O'Hara
July 20	"Murder Goes for a Swim"	Warren William
August 3	"A Friend to Alexander"	Robert Young, Geraldine Fitzgerald
August 21	"Sorry, Wrong Number"	Agnes Moorehead
August 28	"The King's Birthday"	Dolores Costello, Martin Kosleck, George Zucco, Ian Wolfe
September 9	"Marry for Murder"	Lillian Gish, Ray Collins, Bramwell Fletcher
November 2	"Statement of Employee Henry Wilson"	Gene Lockhart
November 16	"Thieves Fall Out"	Gene Kelly, Hans Conried, William Johnstone
November 23	"The Strange Death of Charles Umberstein"	Vincent Price
December 2	"The Black Curtain"	Cary Grant

=== 1944 ===
Date	Title	Star(s)
January 6	"One Way Ride to Nowhere"	Alan Ladd
January 13	"Dime a Dance"	Lucille Ball
January 20	"A World of Darkness"	Paul Lukas
January 27	"The Locked Room"	Virginia Bruce and Allyn Joslyn
February 3	"The Sisters"	Ida Lupino and Agnes Moorehead
February 10	"Suspicion"	Charlie Ruggles
February 24	"Sorry, Wrong Number" (rebroadcast)	Agnes Moorehead
March 2	"Portrait without a Face"	Michèle Morgan, Philip Dorn, George Coulouris
March 9	"The Defense Rests"	Alan Ladd
March 23	"Sneak Preview"	Joseph Cotten
March 30	"Cat and Mouse"	Sonny Tufts
April 6	"The Woman in Red"	Katina Paxinou
April 13	"The Marvelous Barastro"	Orson Welles
May 11	"The Visitor"	Eddie Bracken
May 18	"Donovan's Brain" (Part 1)	Orson Welles
May 25	"Donovan's Brain" (Part 2)	Orson Welles
June 1	"Fugue in C Minor"	Ida Lupino, Vincent Price
June 8	"Case History of Edward Lowndes"	Thomas Mitchell, Donald Crisp
June 15	"A Friend To Alexander"	Geraldine Fitzgerald
June 22	"The Ten Grand"	Lucille Ball
July 13	"The Beast Must Die"	Herbert Marshall
August 3	"Banquo's Chair"	Donald Crisp
August 10	"The Man Who Knew How"	Charles Laughton
August 17	"The Diary Of Sophronia Winters"	Agnes Moorehead
August 24	"Actor's Blood"	Fredric March
August 31	"The Black Path of Fear"	Brian Donlevy
September 7	"Voyage Through Darkness"	Olivia de Havilland and Reginald Gardiner
September 14	"You Will Never See Me Again"	Joseph Cotten
September 21	"The Bluebird of Bellac"	Merle Oberon
October 12	"The Merry Widower"	Reginald Gardner

=== 1945 ===
Date	Title	Star(s)
May 24	"My Own Murderer"	Herbert Marshall
August 16	"Short Order"	Joseph Kearns, Gerald Mohr and Conrad Binyon.
September 20	"Library Book"	Myrna Loy

=== 1946 ===
Date	Title	Star(s)
February 21	"Consequence"	James Stewart
March 21	"The Lonely Road"	Gregory Peck
June 27	"Return Trip"	Elliott Reid
August 8	"Dead Ernest"	Wally Maher
October 17	"The Man Who Thought He Was Edward G. Robinson"	Edward G. Robinson
October 24	"Dame Fortune"	Susan Hayward
November 21	"Drive-In"	Judy Garland
December 5	"The House in Cypress Canyon"	Robert Taylor

=== 1947 ===
Date	Title	Star(s)
January 30	"Three Blind Mice"	Van Heflin
February 6	"The End of the Road"	Glenn Ford
February 13	"The Thirteenth Sound"	Agnes Moorehead
February 20	"Always Room at the Top"	Anne Baxter
April 28	"Summer Storm"	Henry Fonda
May 1	"Lady In Distress"	Ava Gardner
May 22	"Her Knight Comes Riding"	Virginia Bruce
June 12	"Stand-In"	June Havoc
June 19	"Dead of Night"	Elliott Reid
July 11	"Murder by the Book"	Gloria Swanson
August 28	"Double Ugly"	June Havoc and Lloyd Nolan
October 2	"The Story of Markham's Death"	Kirk Douglas
October 30	"Subway"	June Havoc
November 20	"One Hundred in the Dark"	Howard Duff and June Havoc
December 19	"Wet Saturday"	June Havoc and Boris Karloff

=== 1948 ===
Date	Title	Star(s)
January 3	"The Black Curtain"	Robert Montgomery
January 10	"The Kandy Tooth"	Howard Duff
January 24	"The Black Angel / Eve"	June Havoc and Prince Michael Romanoff
July 22	"Deep Into Darkness"	Douglas Fairbanks Jr.
September 2	"The Morrison Affair"	Madeleine Carroll and Gerald Mohr
November 4	"Death Sentence"	John Garfield
November 25	"The Screaming Woman"	Ray Bradbury

=== 1949 ===
Date	Title	Star(s)
February 3	"Backseat Driver"	Jim and Marian Jordan
April 21	"The Copper Tea Strainer"	Betty Grable, Raymond Burr, and William Conrad
May 5	"Death Has A Shadow"	Bob Hope and William Conrad
May 26	"The Night Reveals"	Fredric March
January 24	"Blind Date"	June Havoc and Charles Laughton
November 24	"The Long Wait"	Burt Lancaster
December 1	"Mission Completed"	James Stewart
December 15	"The Flame Blue Glove"	Lana Turner

=== 1950 ===
Date	Title	Star(s)
February 9	"The Butcher's Wife"	Kirk Douglas
March 2	"Lady Killer"	Loretta Young
March 23	"One and One's a Lonesome"	Ronald Reagan
September 7	"The Tip"	Ida Lupino, Joseph Kearns, Jerry Hausner, Hy Averback, Henry Blair
November 16	"On a Country Road"	Cary Grant
November 23	"Going, Going, Gone"	Ozzie Nelson, Harriet Hilliard

=== 1951 ===
Date	Title	Star(s)
January 4	"Alibi Me"	Mickey Rooney, Peggy Webber, Wally Maher, Charlotte Lawrence, Leo Cleary
May 10	"Death on My Hands"	Phil Harris and Alice Faye
September 17	"Neal Cream, Doctor of Poison"	Charles Laughton, Charles Davis, Betty Harford, Jeanette Nolan, Georgia Ellis, Alma Lawton, Herb Butterfield, Joseph Kearns
September 24	"The McKay College Basketball Scandal"	Tony Curtis

=== 1952 ===
Date	Title	Star(s)
June 2	"A Good and Faithful Servant"	Jack Benny and Gerald Mohr
October 6	"The Diary of Dr. Pritchard"	Cedric Hardwicke, Paula Winslowe, Alma Lawton, Norma Varden, Ben Wright
October 20	"The Death of Barbara Allen"	Anne Baxter
December 22	"Arctic Rescue"	Joseph Cotten

=== 1953 ===
Date	Title	Star(s)
February 9	"The Man Who Cried Wolf"	Joseph Kearns
February 16	"The Love And Death of Joaquin Murrieta"	Victor Mature
April 27	"The Man Within"	Herbert Marshall
May 4	Othello	Elliott Lewis, Cathy Lewis, and Richard Widmark
May 11	Othello	Elliott Lewis, Cathy Lewis, and Richard Widmark
December 14	The Mystery of Marie Roget	Cornel Wilde
December 21	"'Twas the Night Before Christmas"	Greer Garson

=== 1954 ===
Date	Title	Star(s)
March 8	"Circumstantial Terror"	Ronald Reagan
March 29	"Somebody Help Me"	Cornel Wilde
April 12	"Parole to Panic"	Broderick Crawford
August 3	"Goodnight, Mrs. Russell"	Virginia Gregg and Vic Perrin
November 18	"Blind Date"	Shirley Mitchell and Vic Perrin

=== 1955 ===
Date	Title	Star(s)
April 5	"Zero Hour"	John Dehner (narrator)
May 17	"Lili and the Colonel"	Ramsay Hill, John Alderson, Paula Winslowe, Larry Thor (narrator)
July 26	"Greatest Thief"	Ben Wright
October 25	"To None a Deadly Drug"	Harry Bartell
November 15	"Once a Murderer"	Ben Wright
December 13	"A Present for Benny"	Jack Kruschen

=== 1956 ===
Date	Title	Star(s)
March 1	"The Waxworks"	William Conrad (narrator)
July 25	"The Tramp"	Ben Wright
October 23	"The Doll"	Patty McCormack

=== 1957 ===
Date	Title	Star(s)
June 30	"The Yellow Wallpaper"	Agnes Moorehead, Joe De Santis
August 18	"Peanut Brittle"	Skip Homeier
August 25	"Leinengen vs. the Ants"	William Conrad

=== 1958 ===
Date	Title	Star(s)
April 20	"Alibi Me"	Stan Freberg

=== 1959 ===
Date	Title	Star(s)
January 4	"Don't Call Me Mother"	Agnes Moorehead

=== 1961 ===
Date	Title	Star(s)
December 17	"Yuletide Miracle"	Larry Haines and Santos Ortega
December 31	"The Old Man"	Leon Janney

=== 1962 ===
Date	Title	Star(s)
September 30	"Devilstone"	Christopher Carey and Neil Fitzgerald

== Revival ==
In 2012, John C. Alsedek and Dana Perry-Hayes of Blue Hours Productions revived Suspense for Sirius XM Radio, recording all-new scripts including originals and adaptations of works by the likes of H.P. Lovecraft, Cornell Woolrich, and Clark Ashton Smith. The Suspense revival is currently airing on nearly 250 radio stations worldwide, and nominated for a Peabody Award.

=== Season One episodes ===
1. "Cool Air", starring Adrienne Wilkinson & Daamen Krall
2. "The Pipes of Tcho Ktlan", starring Daamen Krall & Rocky Cerda
3. "The Return of the Sorcerer", starring Tucker Smallwood & Ron Bottitta
4. "Proof in the Pudding", starring Adrienne Wilkinson & Christina Joy Howard
5. "The Devil‘s Saint", starring Daamen Krall & Christopher Duva
6. "Gag Reflex", starring Daamen Krall & Elizabeth Gracen
7. "The Graveyard Rats", starring Daamen Krall & Christopher Duva
8. "An Ungentle Wager", starring Elizabeth Gracen & Adrienne Wilkinson
9. "The Fire of Asshurbanipal", starring Christopher Duva & Steve Moulton
10. "The Walls Between Us", starring Adrienne Wilkinson & Rocky Cerda
11. "The Horla", starring Christopher Duva & Elizabeth Gracen
12. "Essence", starring Dana Perry-Hayes & Skyler Caleb
13. "The Hounds of Tindalos", starring Christopher Duva & Daamen Krall
14. "Madeline’s Veil", starring Dana Perry-Hayes & Rocky Cerda
15. "Wet Saturday", starring Daamen Krall & Adrienne Wilkinson
16. "Forest of the Dark Unbound", starring Catherine Kamei & Elizabeth Gracen
17. "Who Goes There?" starring Steve Moulton & Sean Hackman
18. "De Vermis Manorum", starring Elizabeth Gracen & John Lauver
19. "The Night Reveals", starring David Collins & Susan Eisenberg
20. "Ebb Tide", starring Christopher Duva & Adrienne Wilkinson
21. "Far Below", starring Daamen Krall & Catherine Kamei
22. "Behind Every Great Man..." starring Brett Thompson & Adrienne Wilkinson
23. "Pigeons From Hell", starring Scott Henry & Daniel Hackman
24. "Red Rook, White King...Black Cat", starring Adrienne Wilkinson & David Collins

== See also ==

- Suspense (U.S. TV series)
- Academy Award
- Author's Playhouse
- The Campbell Playhouse
- Cavalcade of America
- CBS Radio Mystery Theater
- The CBS Radio Workshop
- Ford Theatre
- General Electric Theater
- Lux Radio Theater
- The Mercury Theatre on the Air
- Screen Director's Playhouse
- The Screen Guild Theater
- The United States Steel Hour

== Sources ==
- Frank M. Passage log: Suspense
