= List of Turkish German sportspeople =

The following is a list of notable Turkish German sportspeople. This includes people of full or partial ethnic Turkish origin born in Germany, as well as ethnic Turkish immigrants who have arrived in Germany either from the Seljuk and Ottoman territories or from post-Ottoman modern nation-states (especially from the Republic of Turkey, but also from the Balkans, Cyprus, as well as other parts of the Levant and North Africa).

See List of Turkish Germans for other Turkish Germans.

== Sports ==
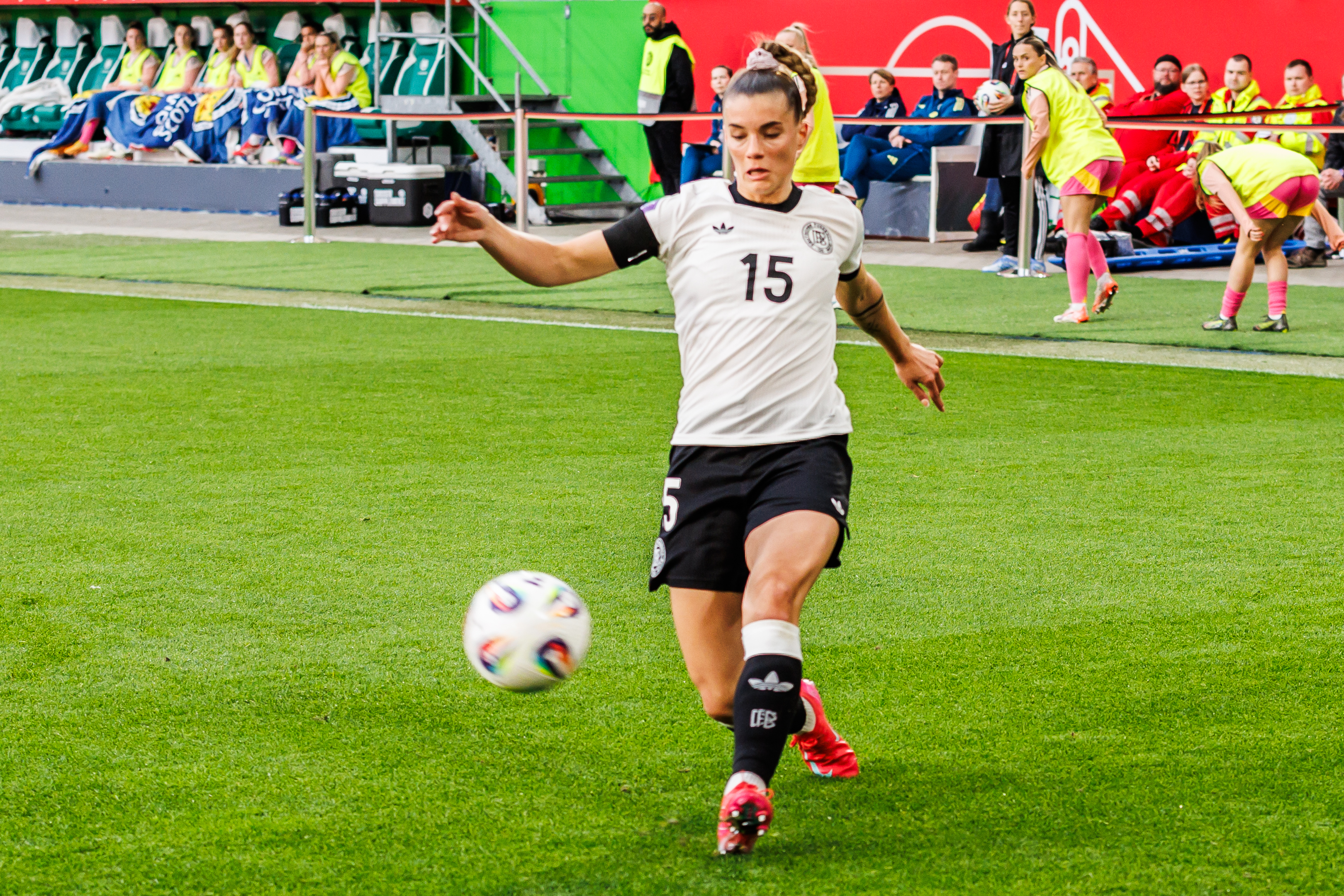
Selina Cerci

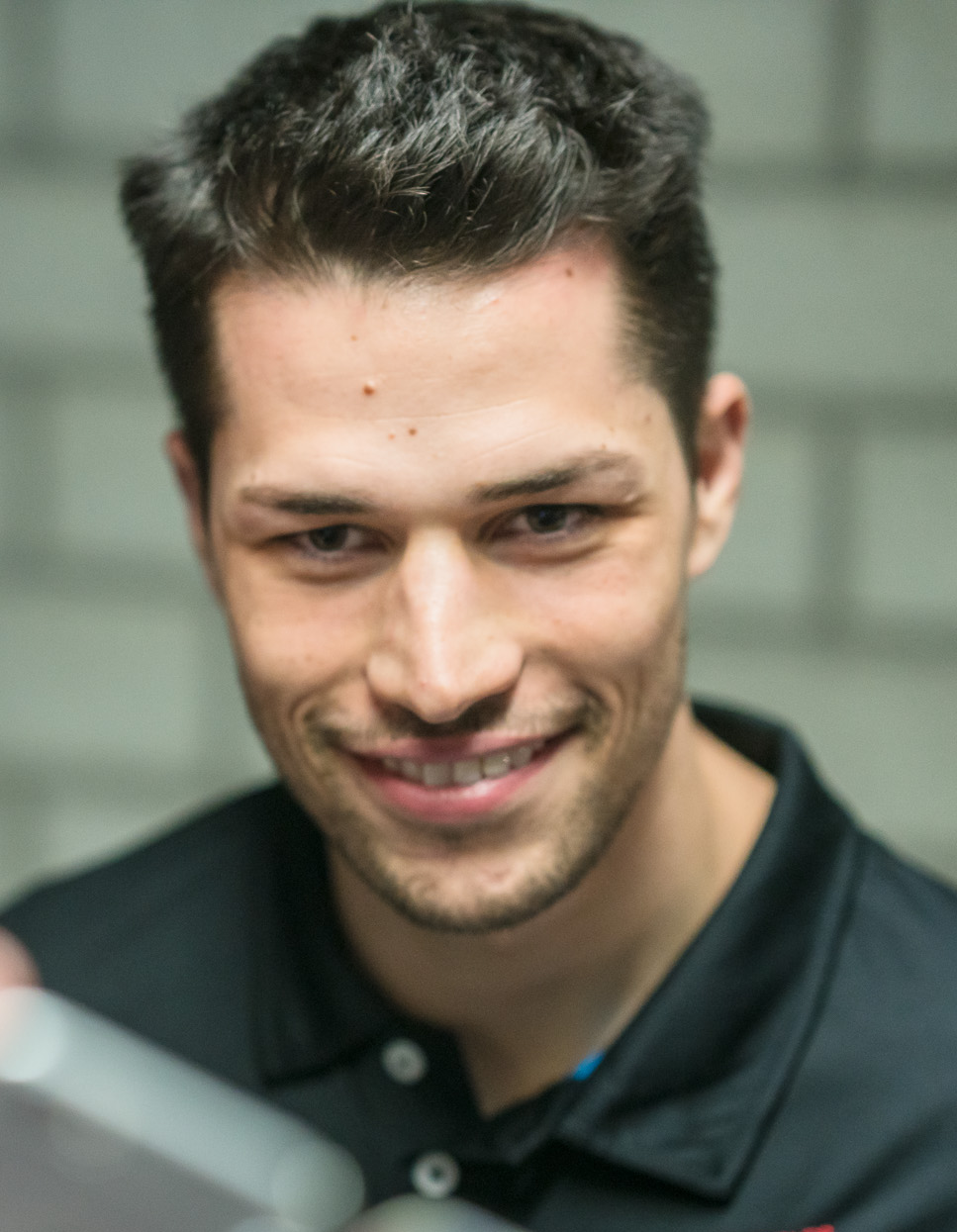
Sinan Akdag

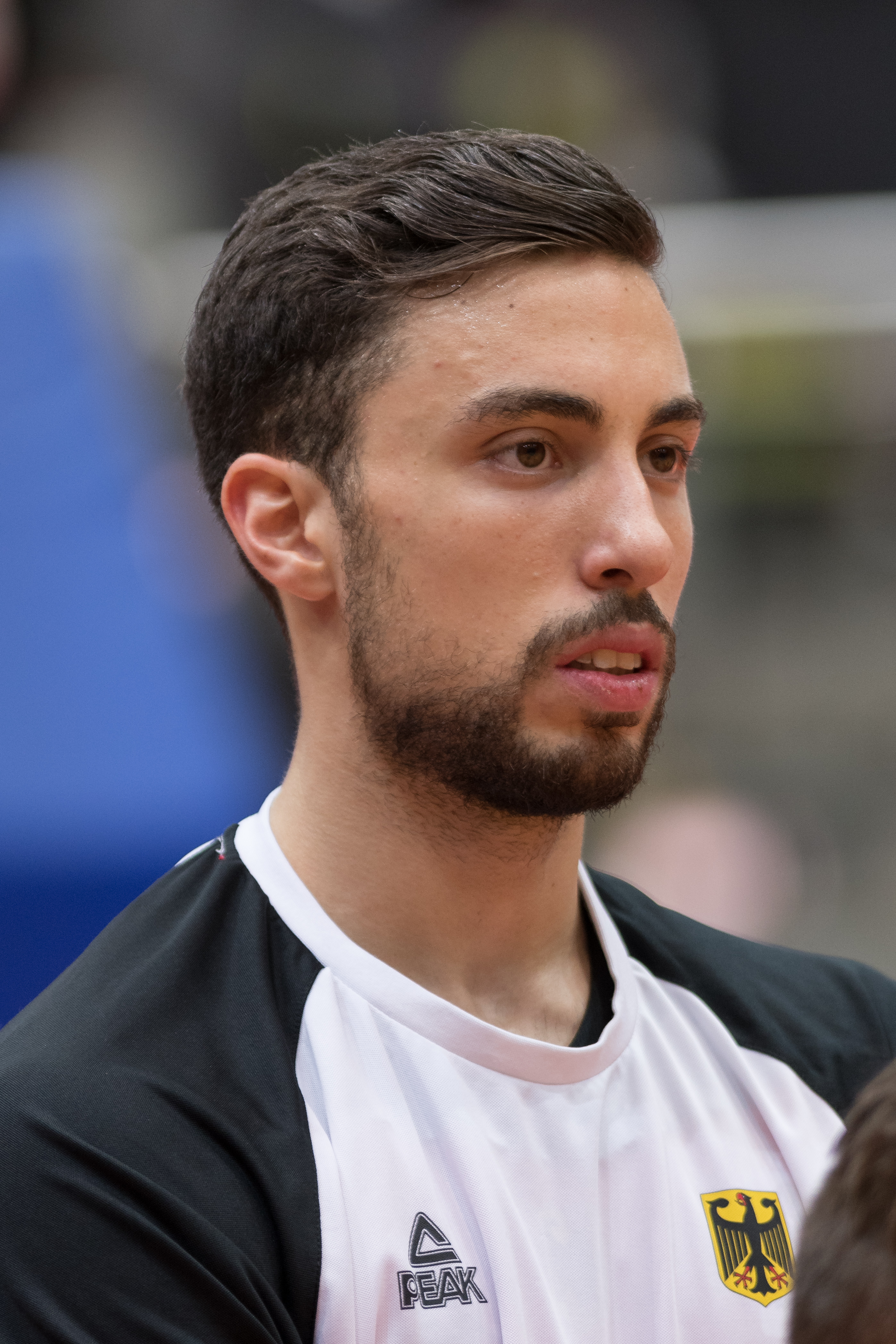
İsmet Akpınar

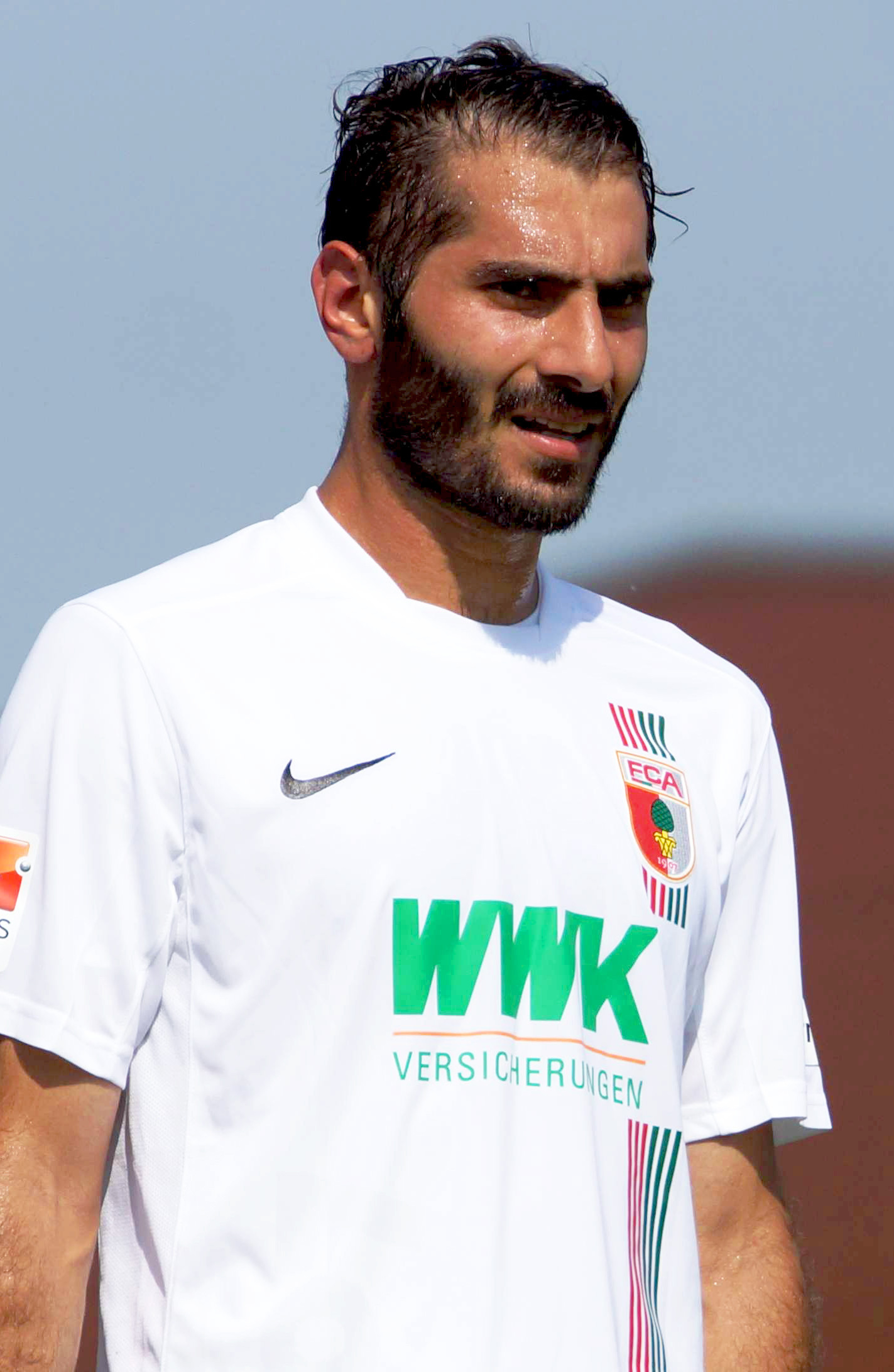
Halil Altıntop

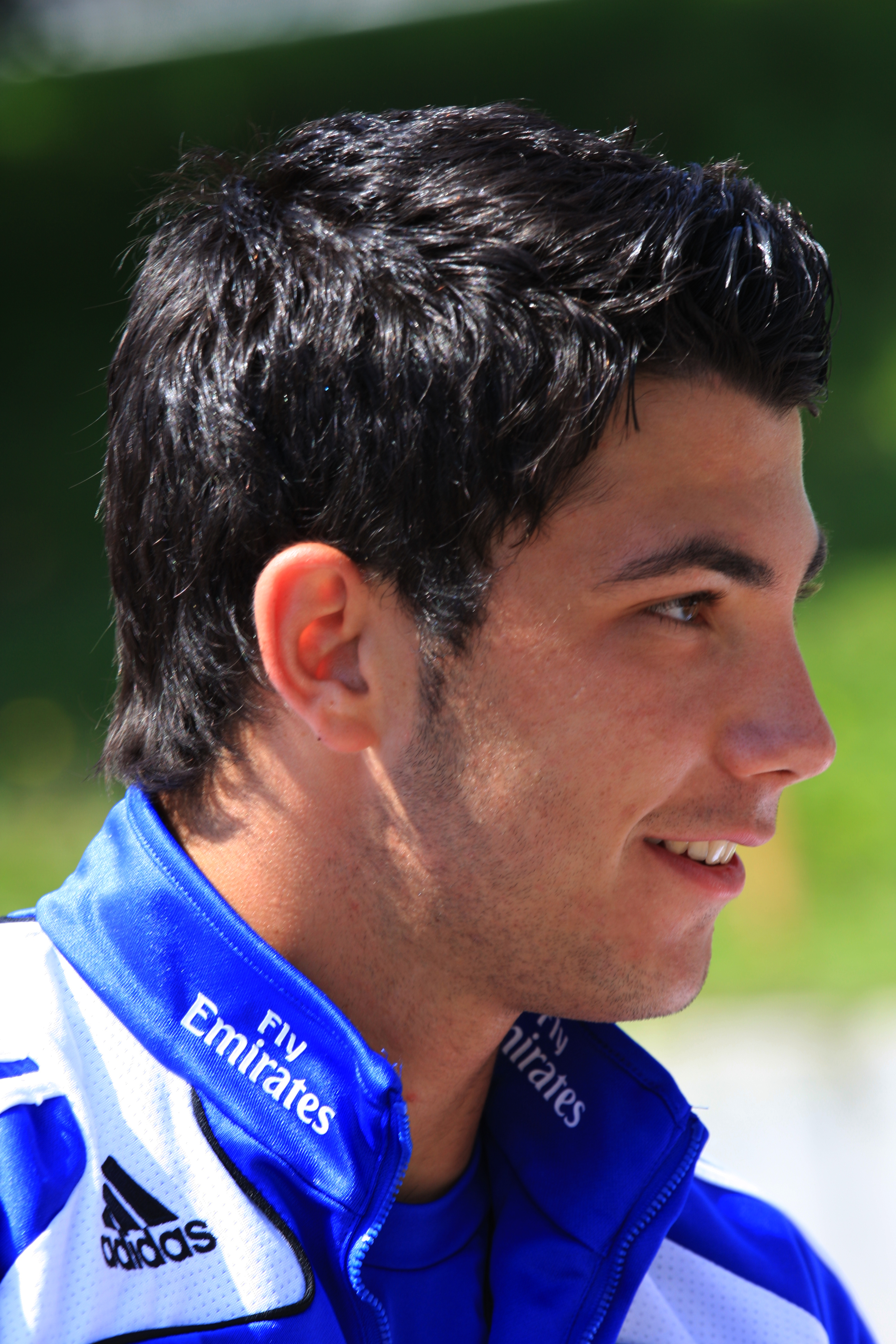
Tolgay Arslan

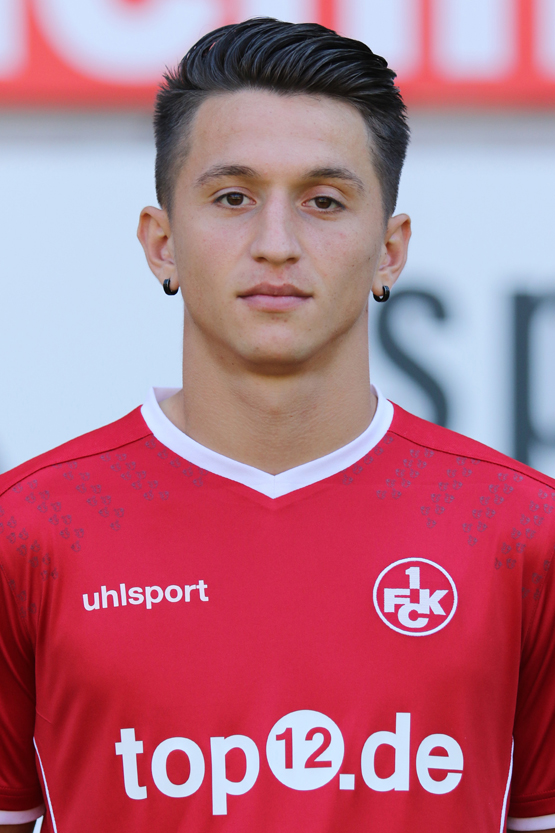
Barış Atik

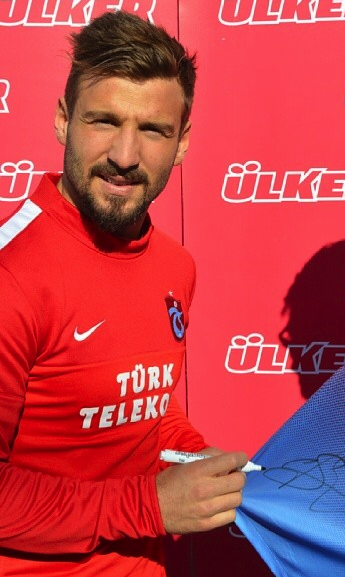
Şahin Aygüneş

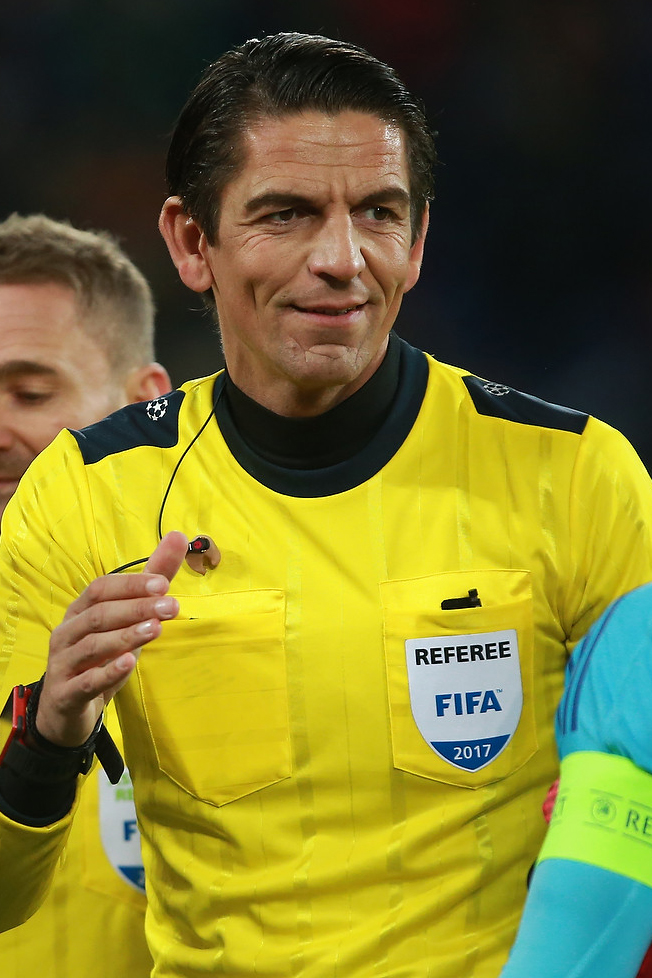
Deniz Aytekin

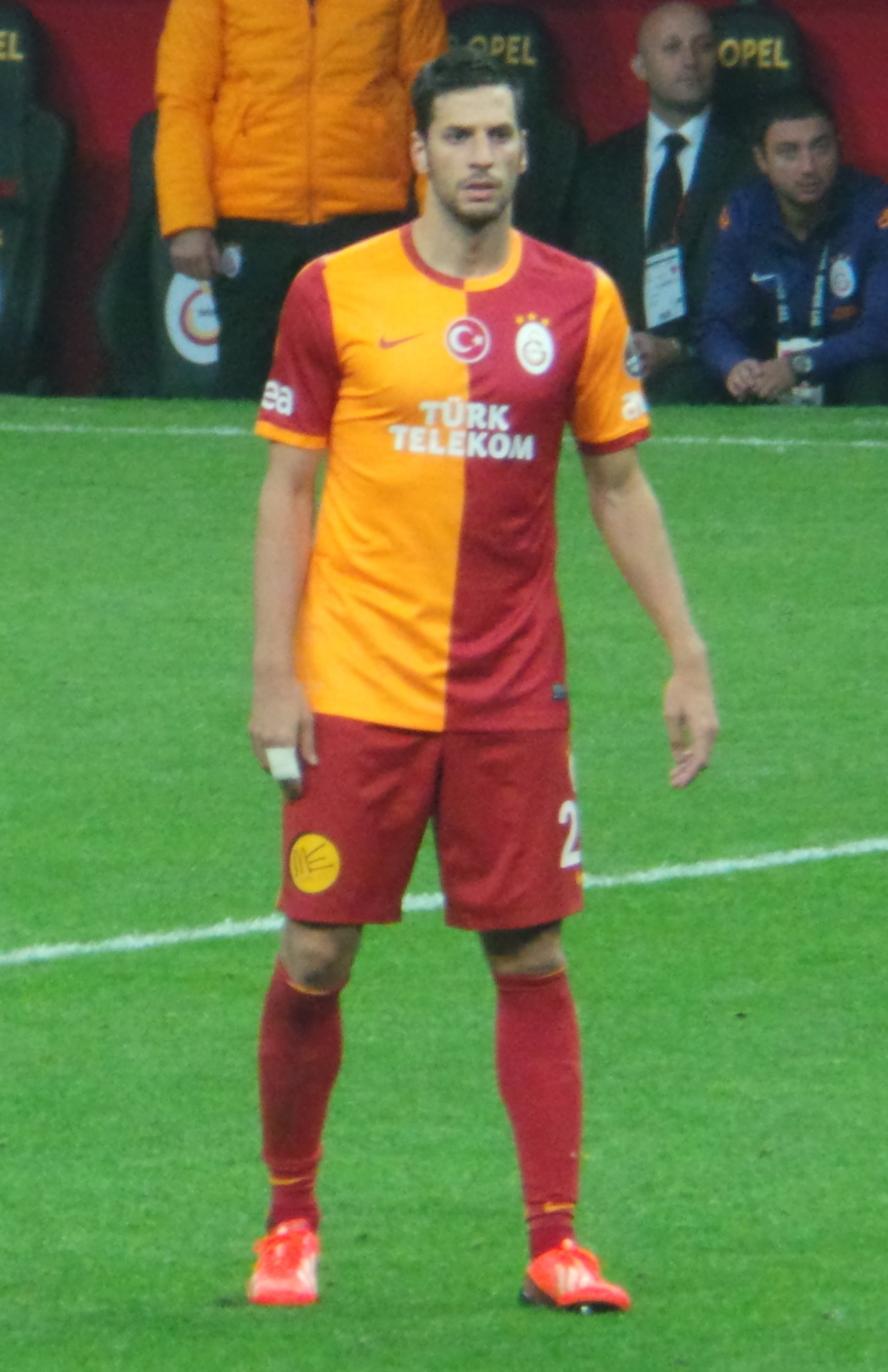
Hakan Balta

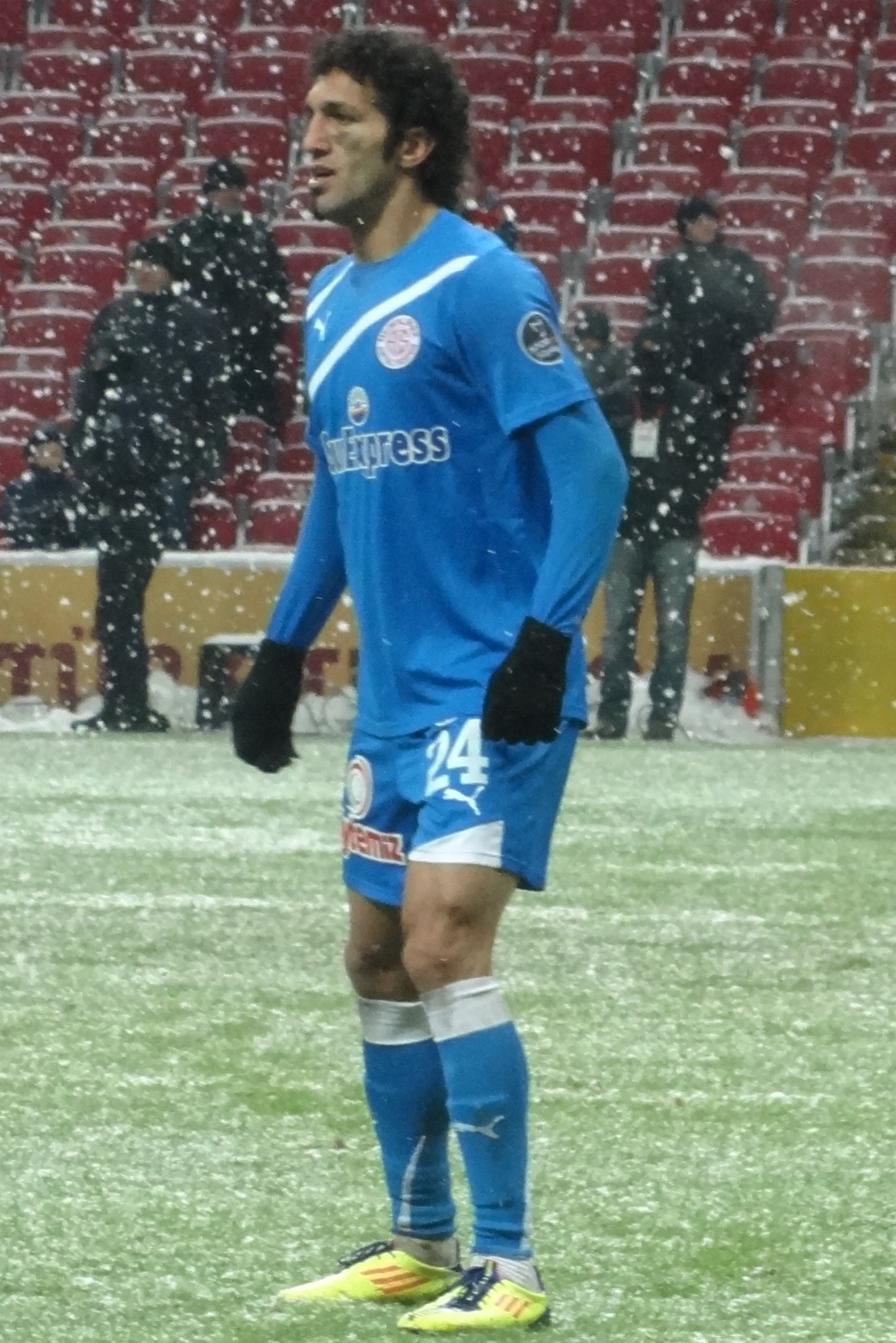
Deniz Barış

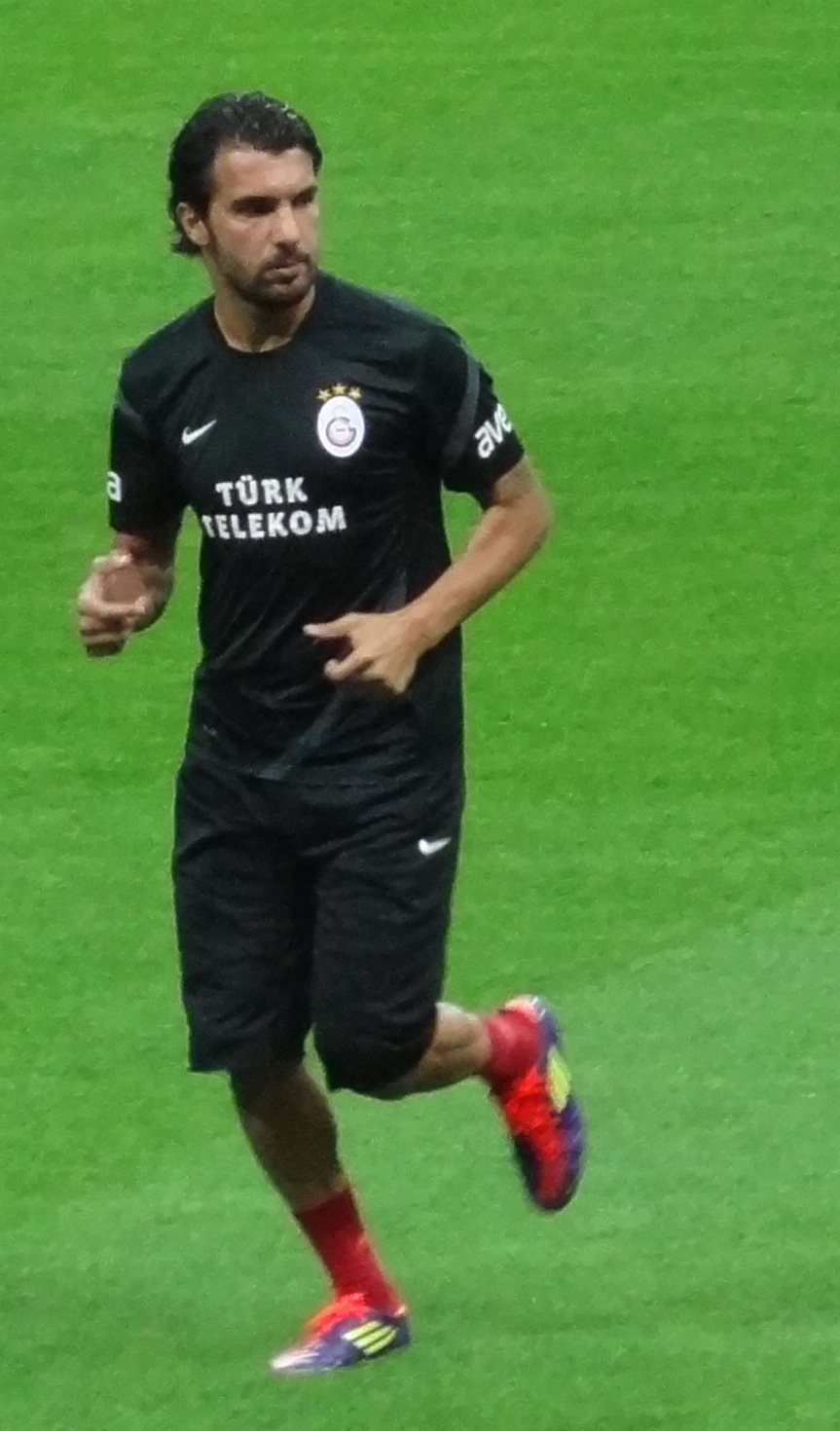
Engin Baytar

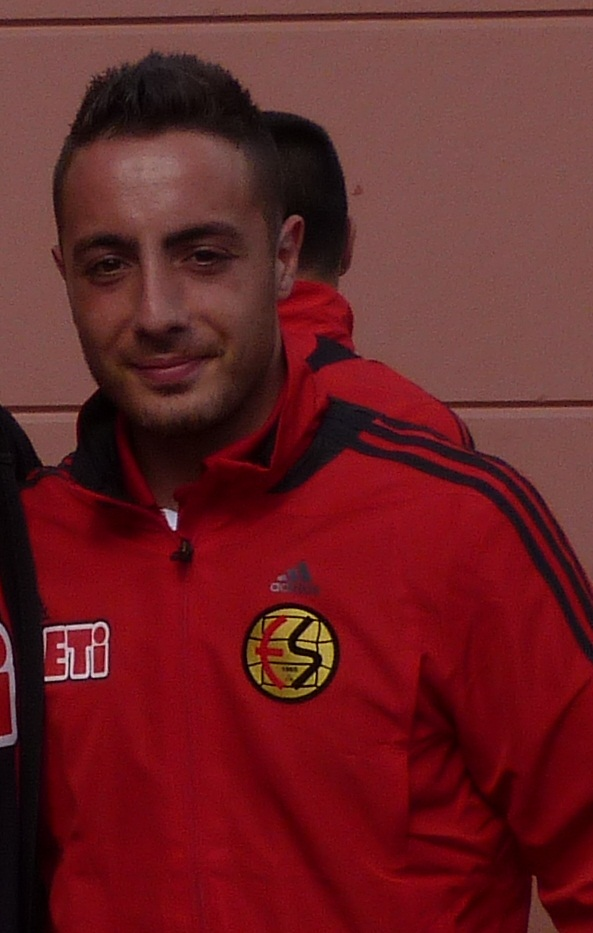
Mehmet Boztepe

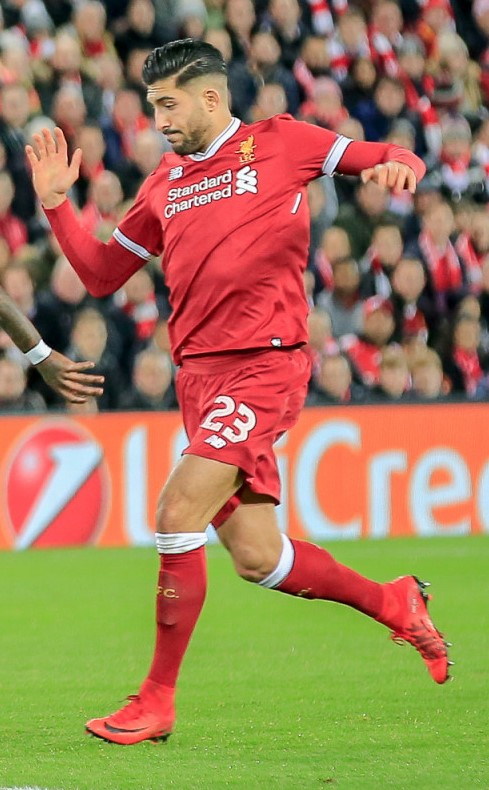
Emre Can.

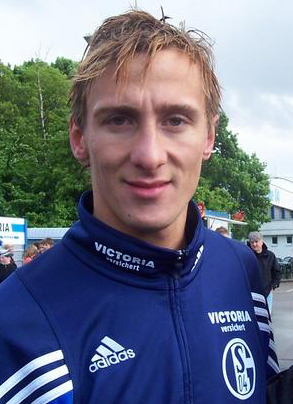
Ahmet Cebe

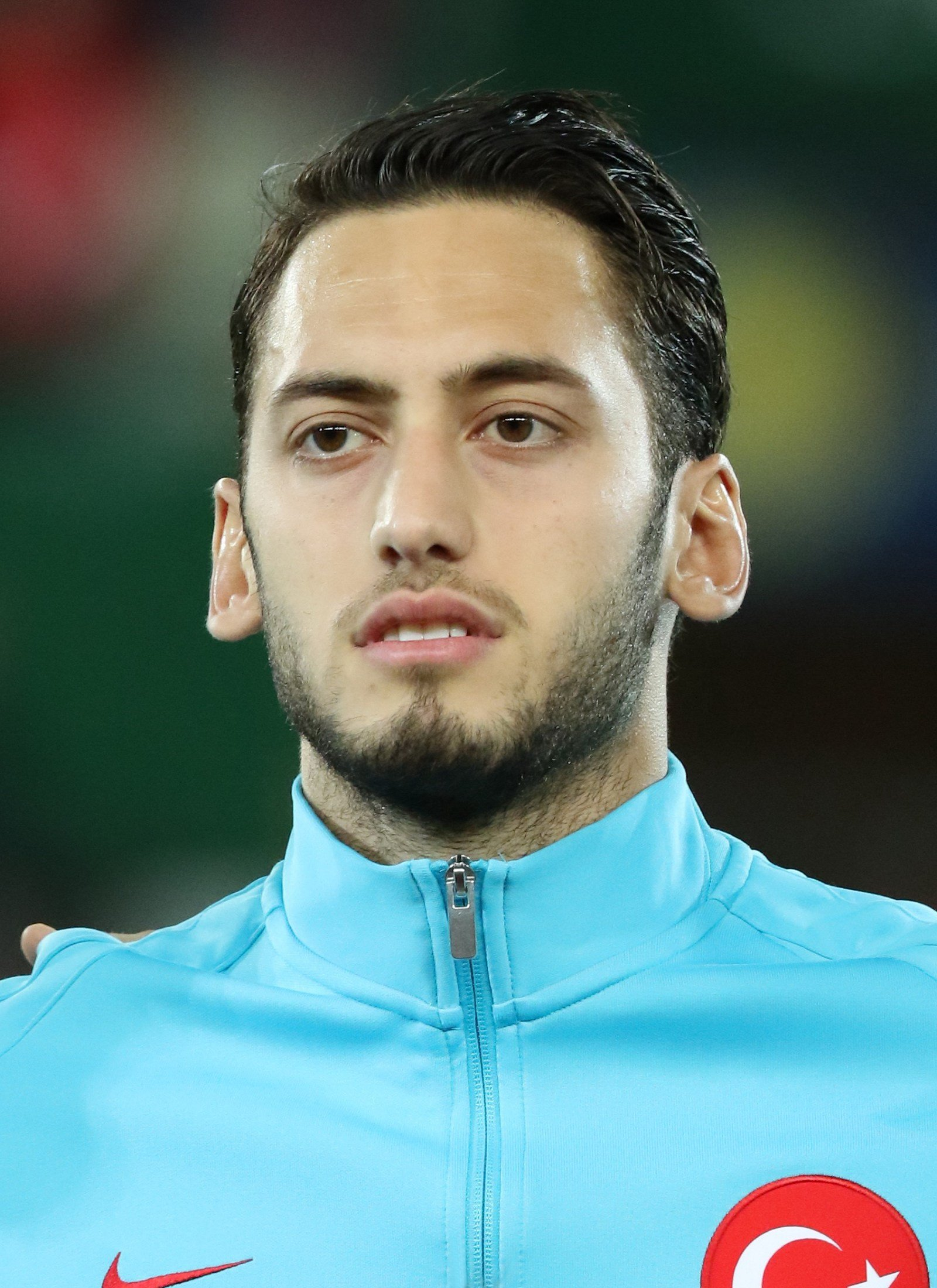
Hakan Çalhanoğlu

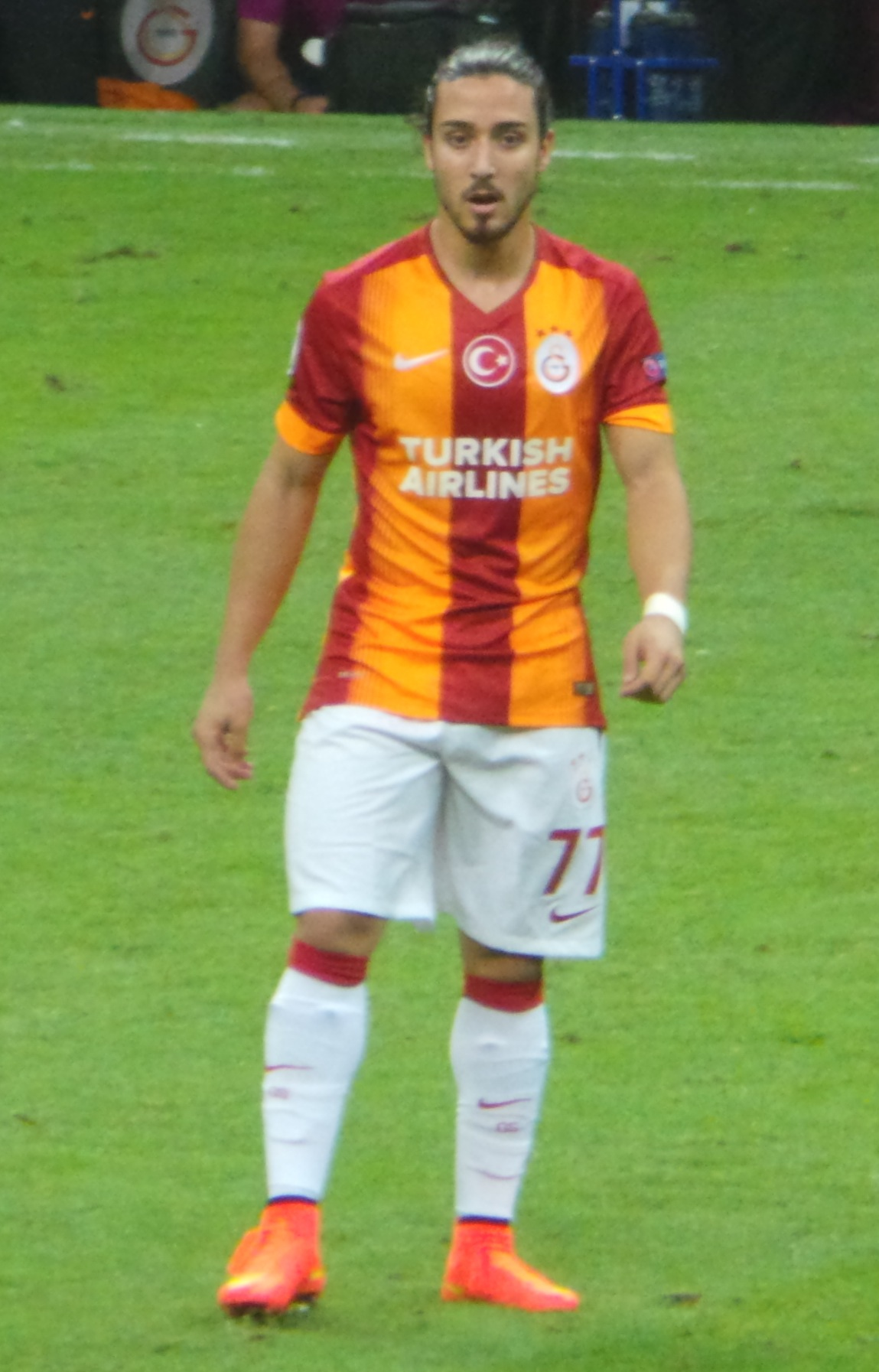
Tarık Çamdal

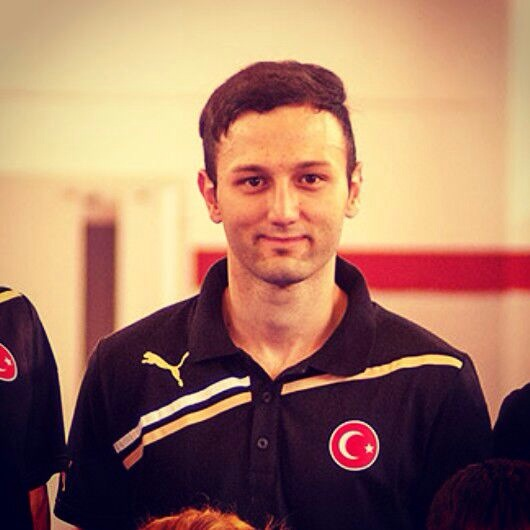
Haşim Çelik

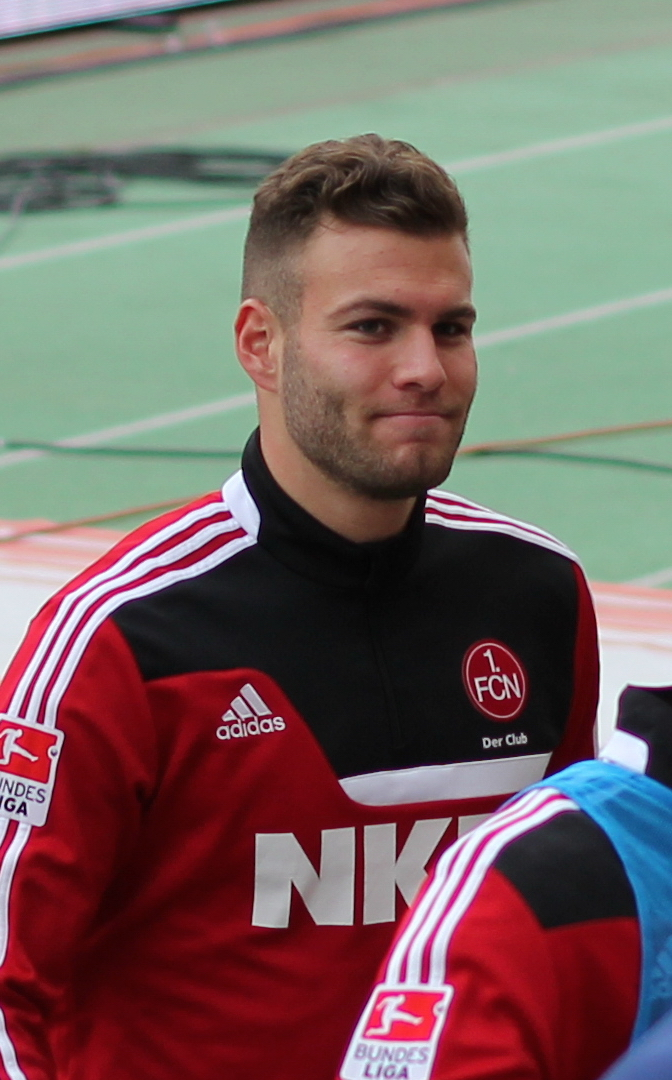
Berkay Dabanlı

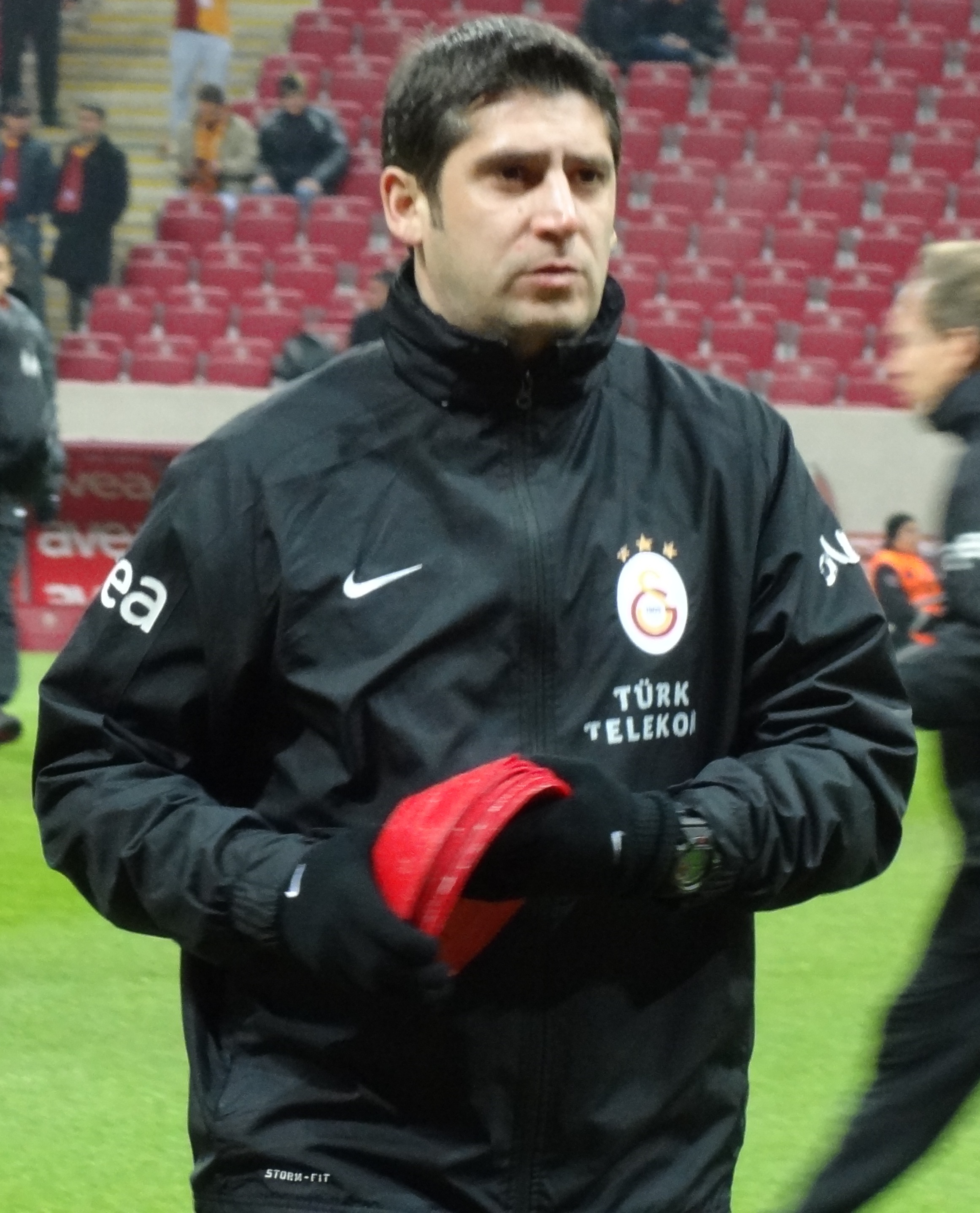
Ümit Davala

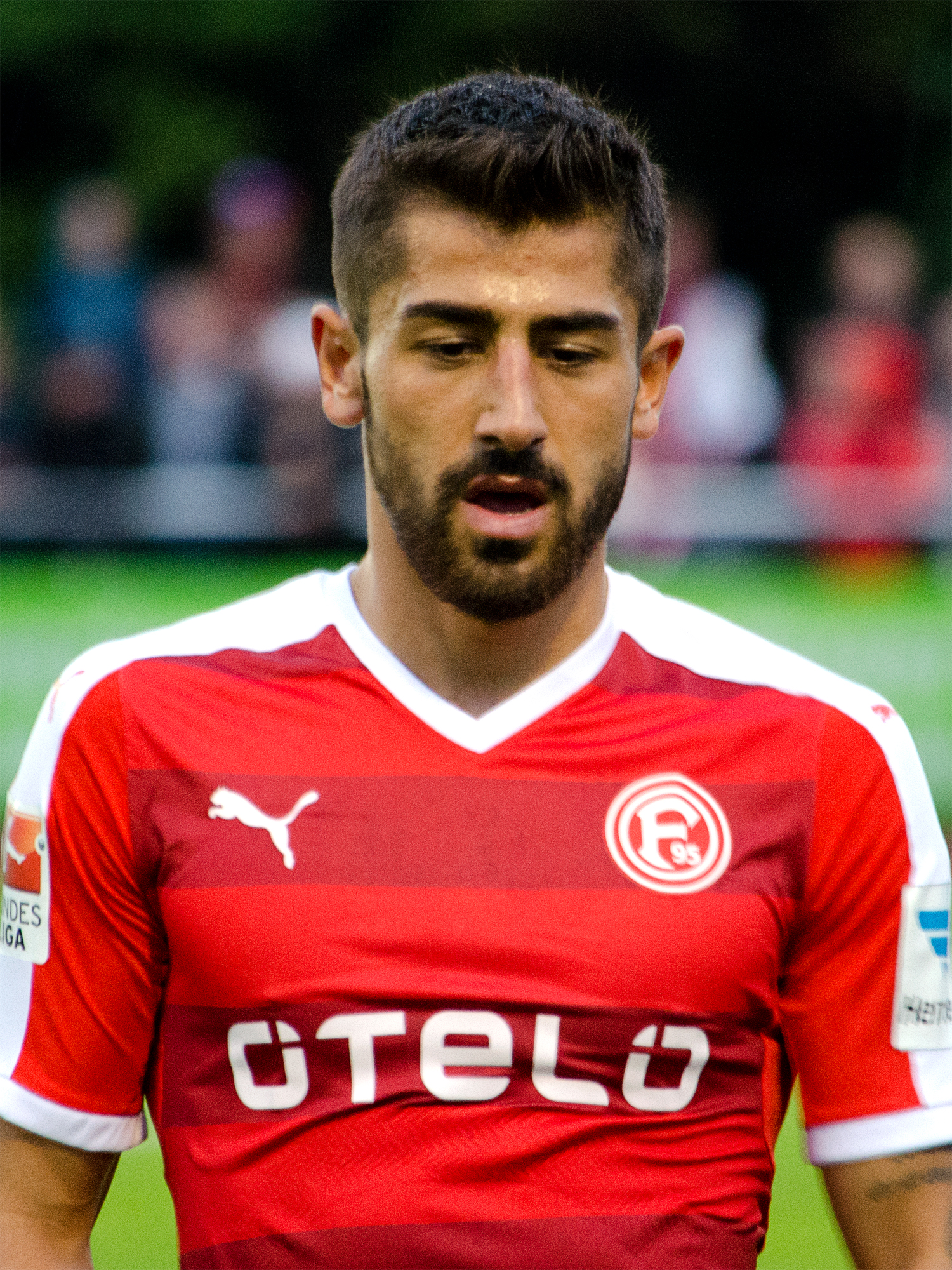
Kerem Demirbay

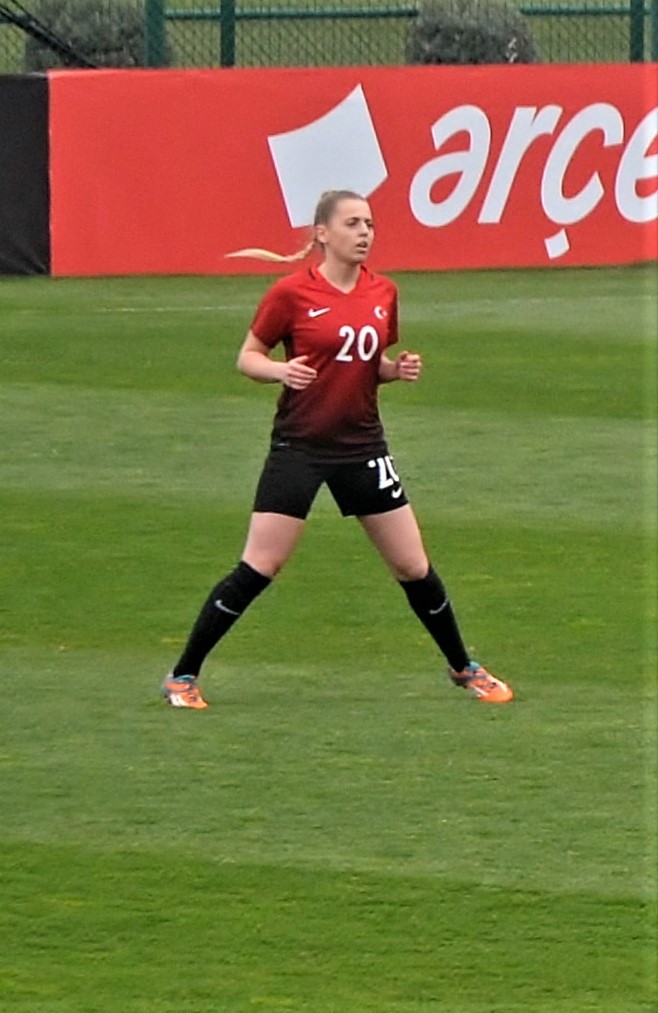
Selin Dişli

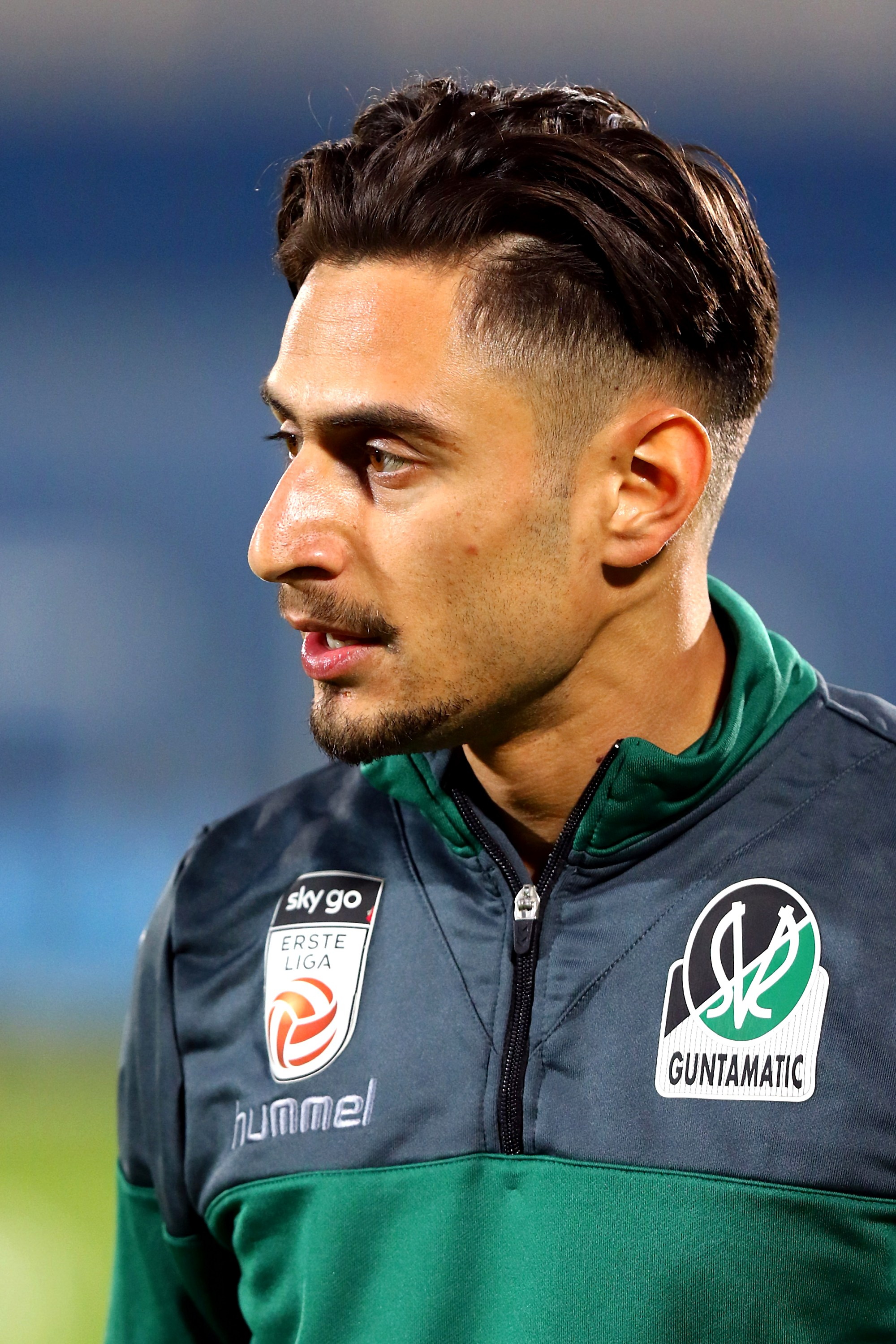
İlkay Durmuş

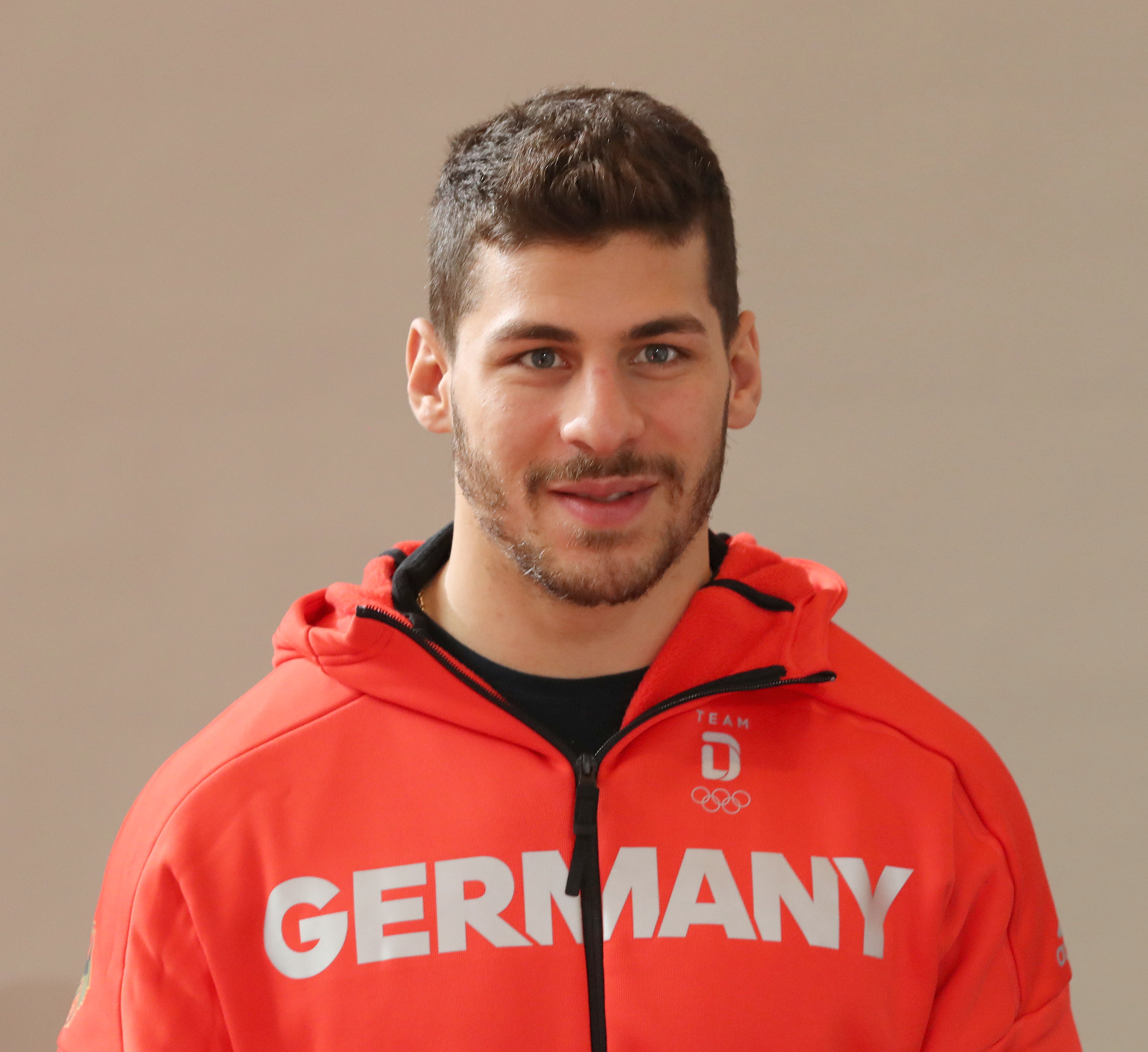
Yasin Ehliz

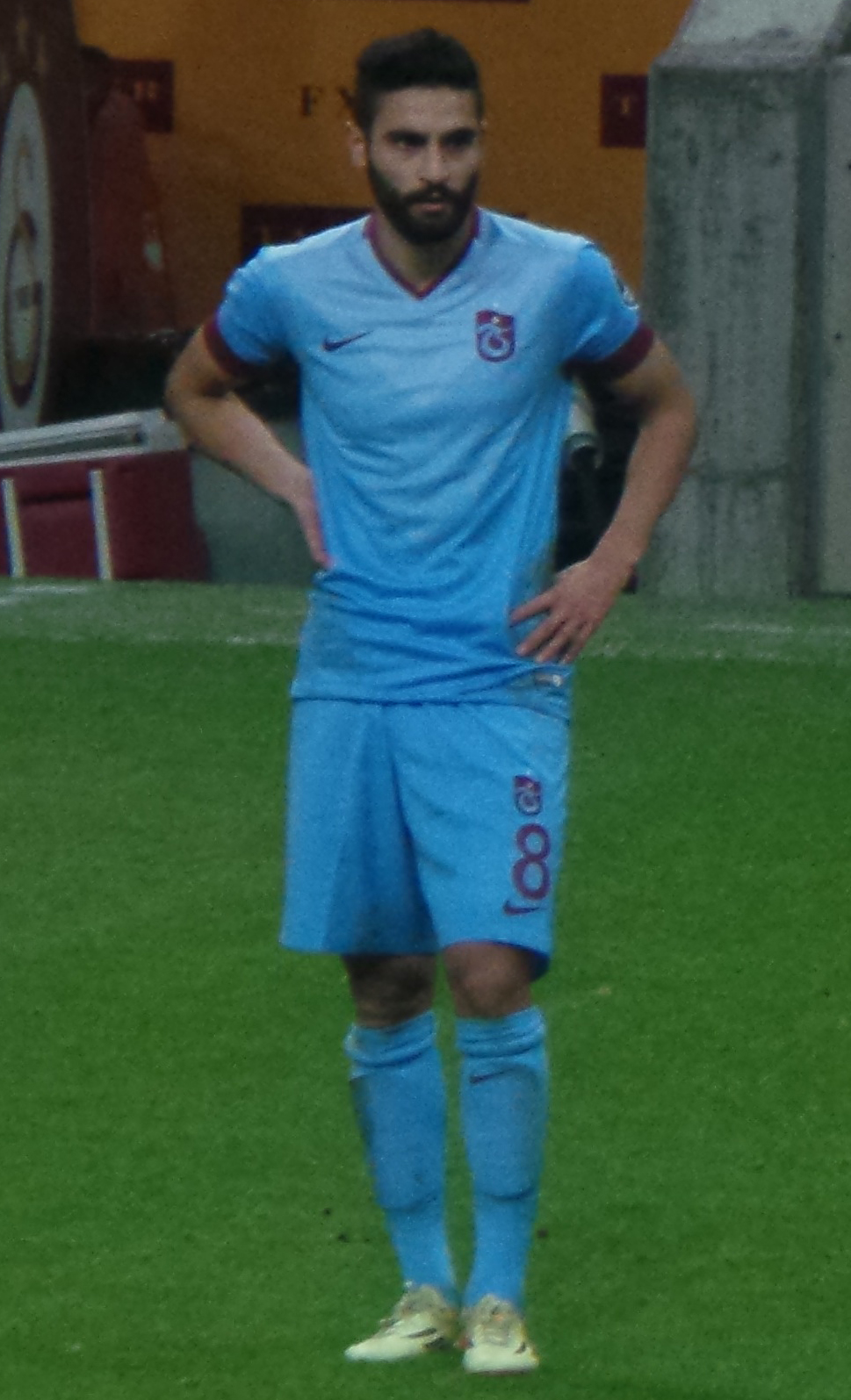
Mehmet Ekici

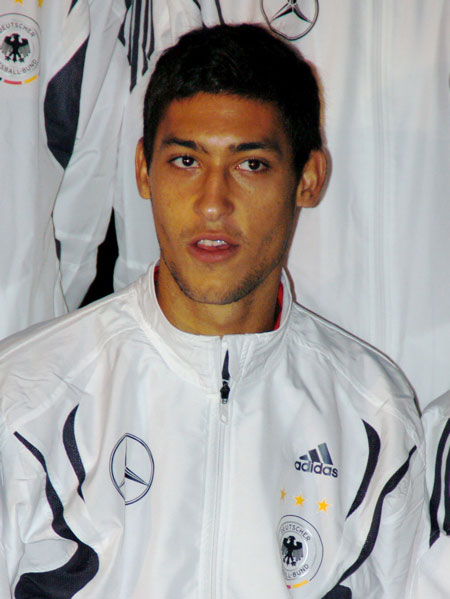
Malik Fathi

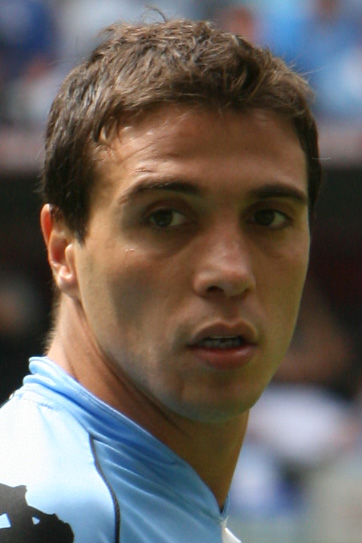
Berkant Göktan

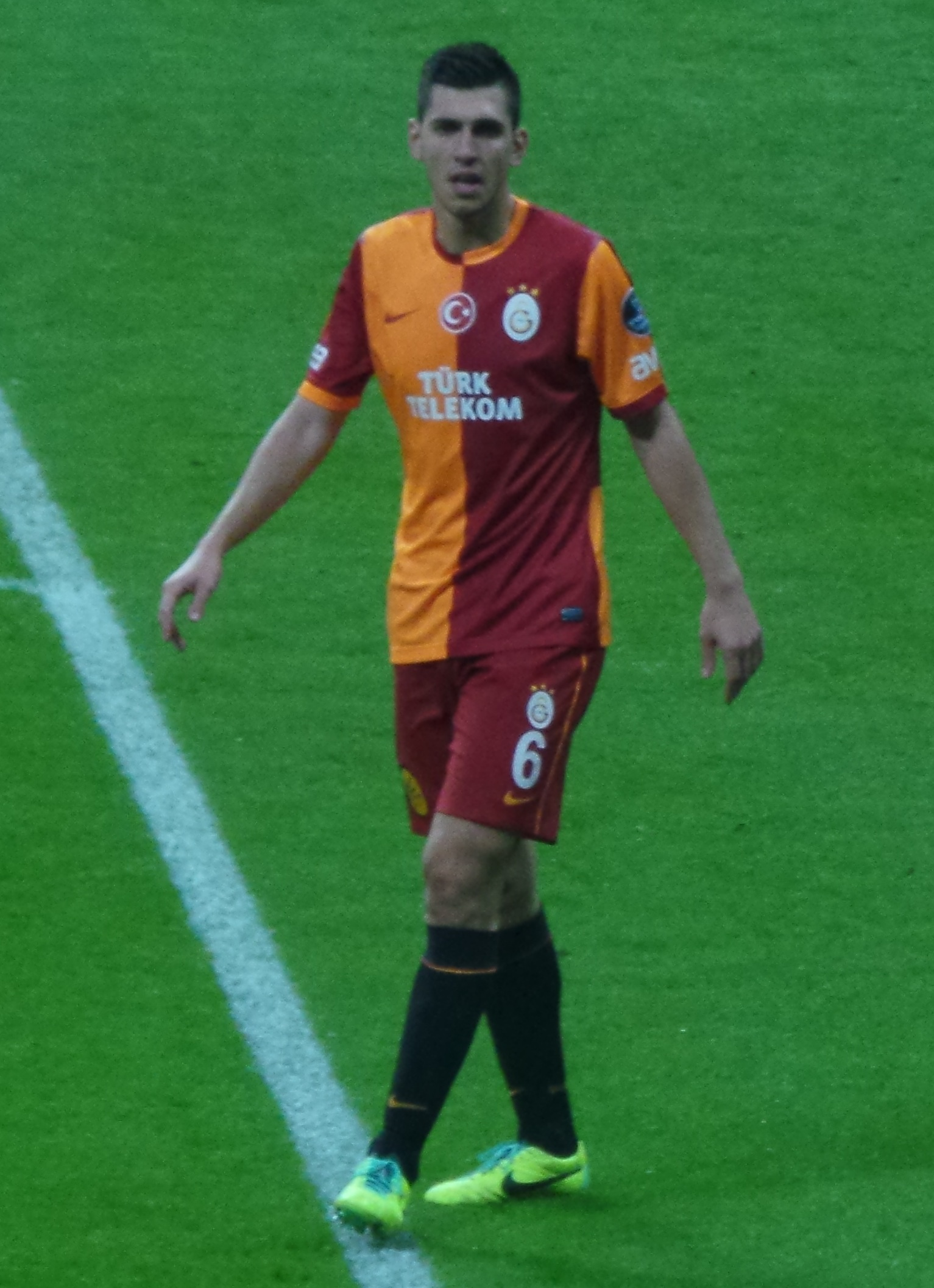
Ceyhun Gülselam

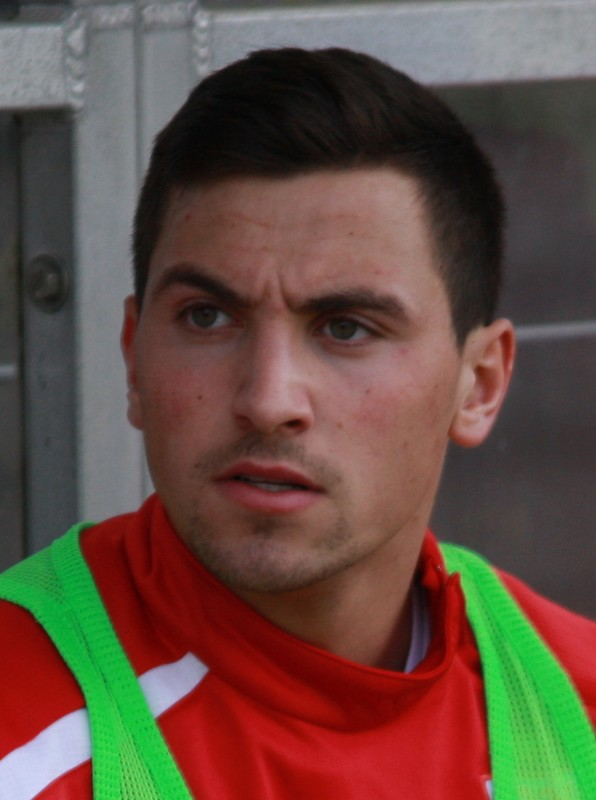
Sinan Gümüş

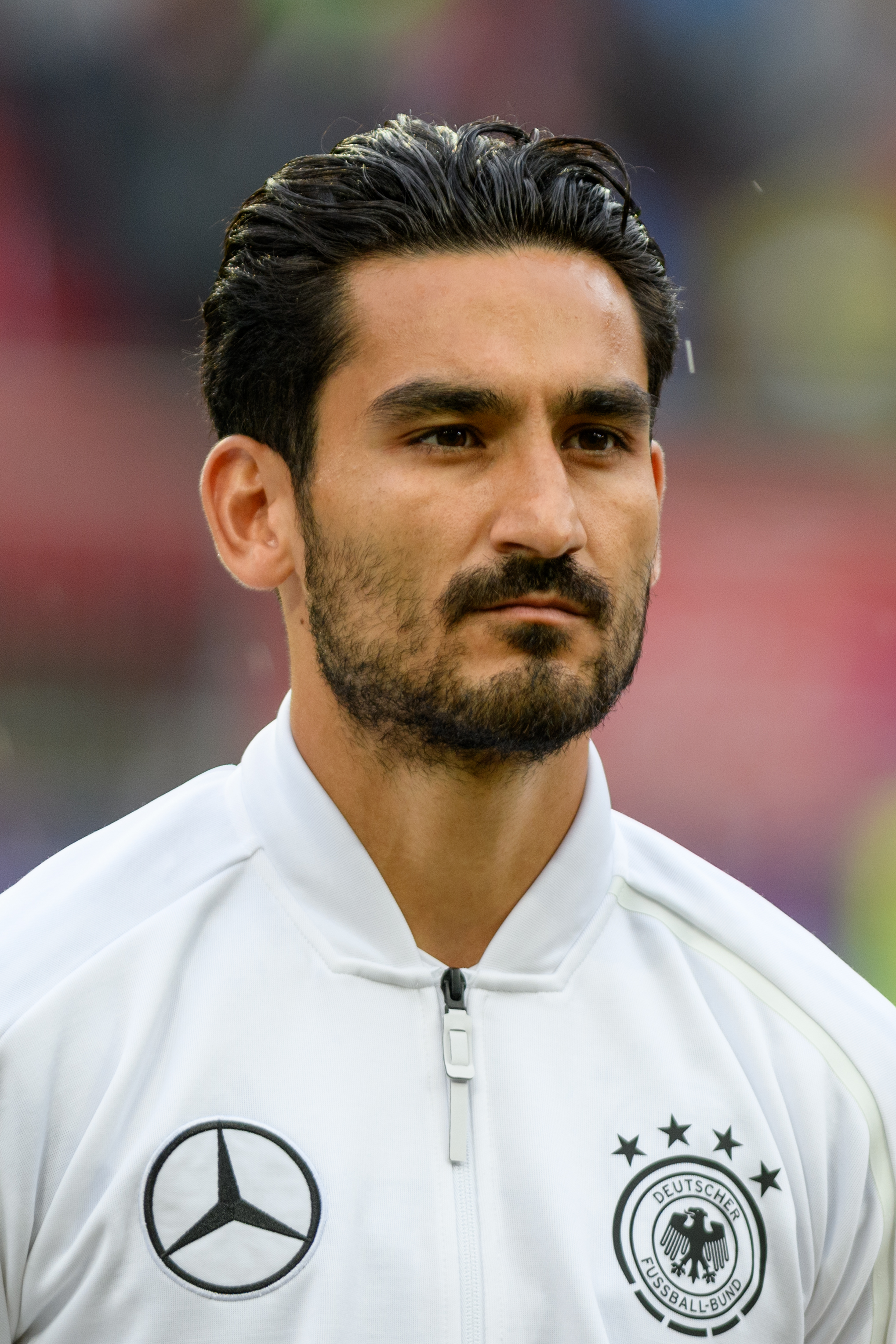
İlkay Gündoğan

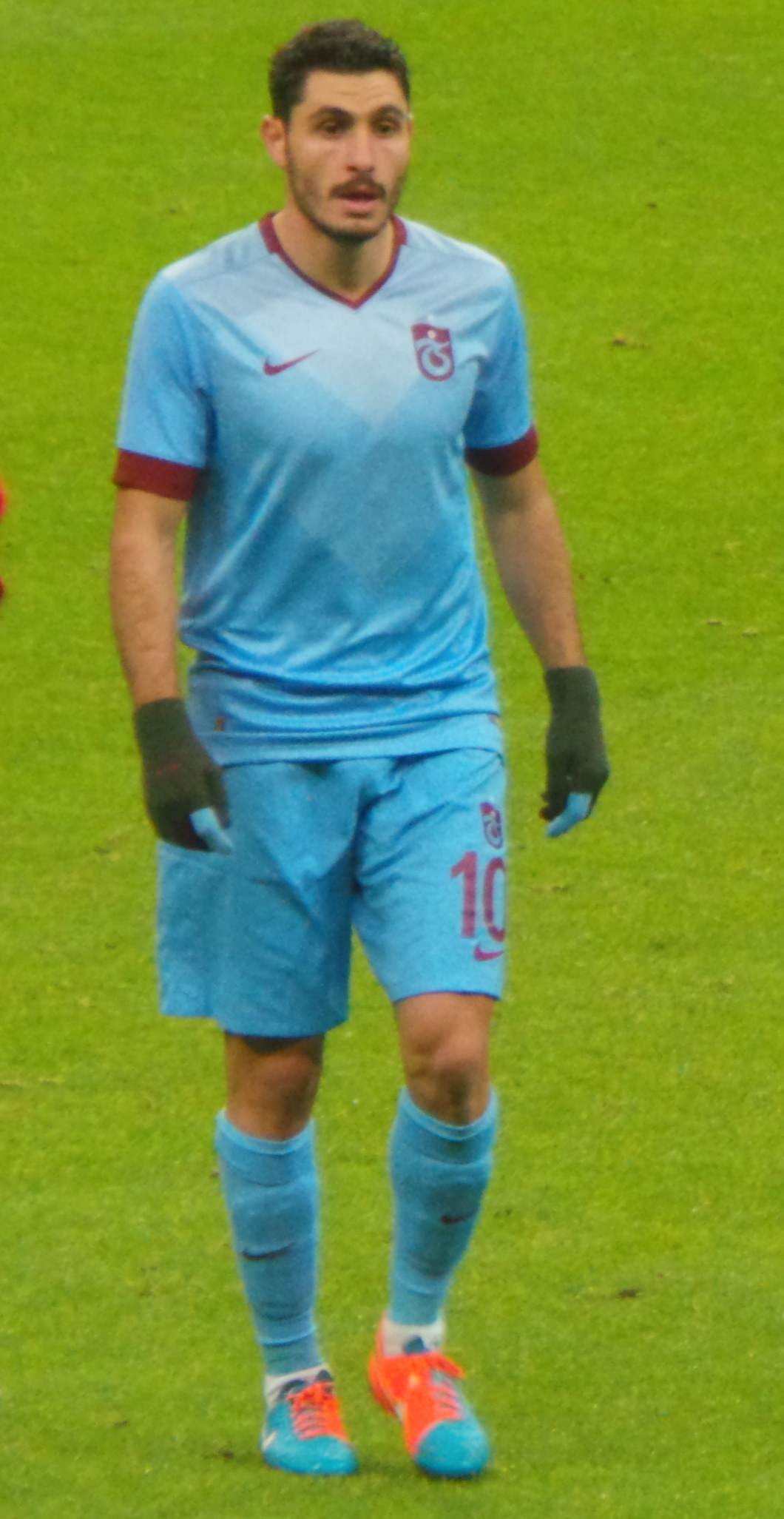
Özer Hurmacı

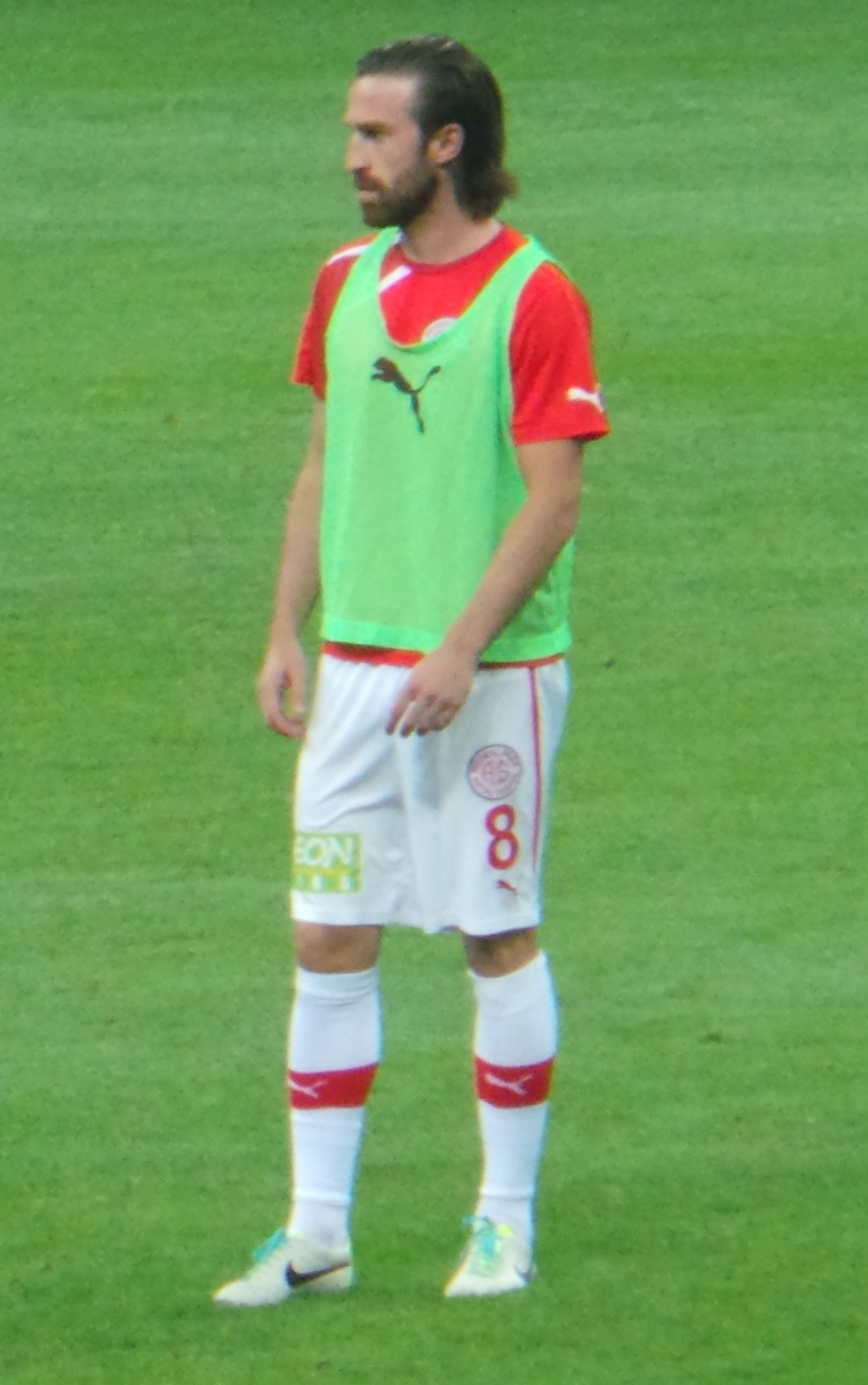
Uğur İnceman

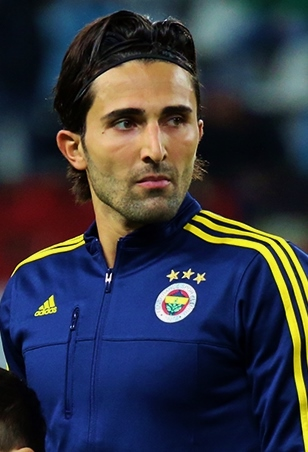
Hasan Ali Kaldırım

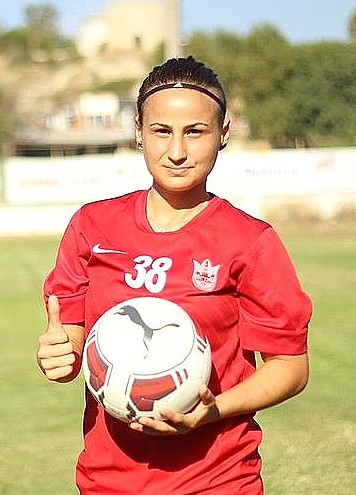
Arzu Karabulut

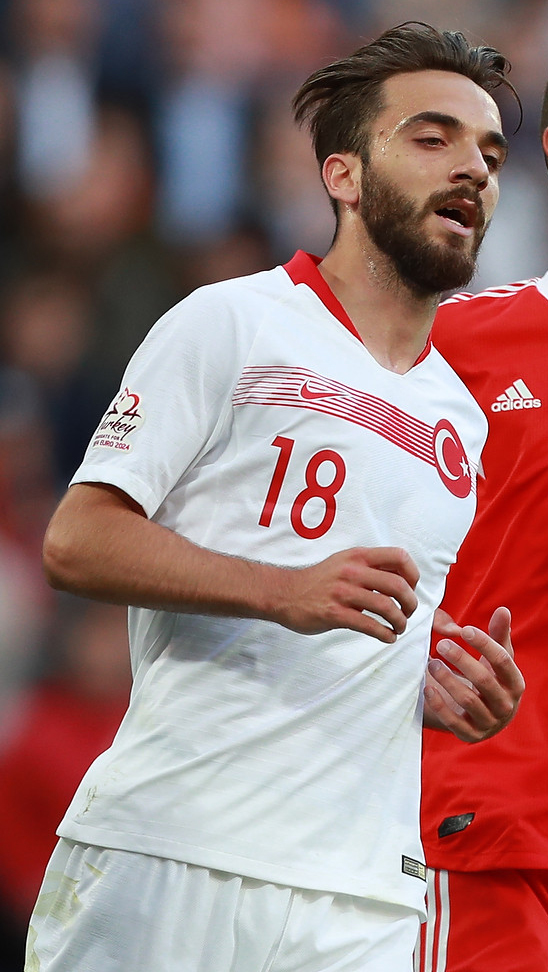
Kenan Karaman

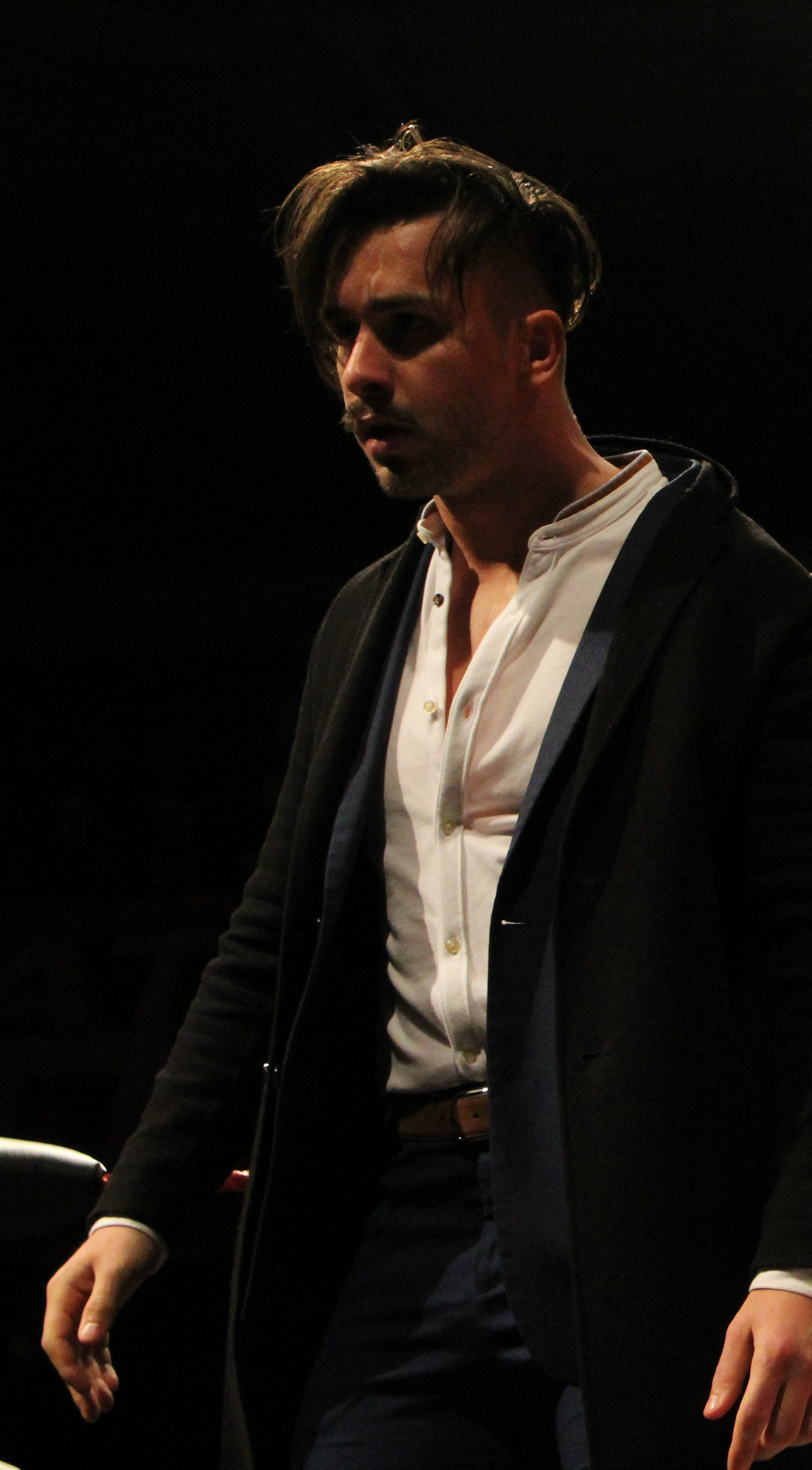
Lucky Kid

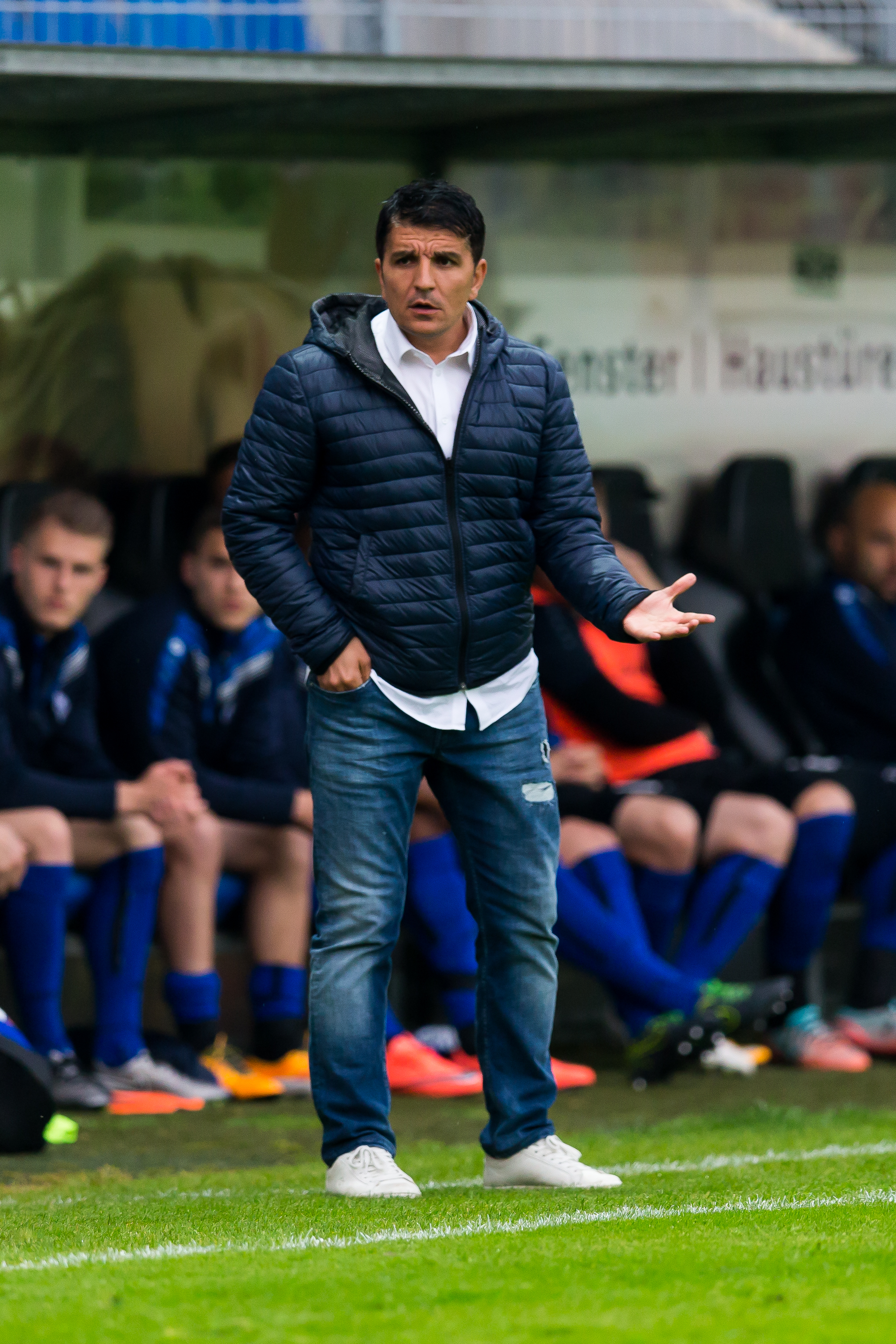
Kenan Kocak

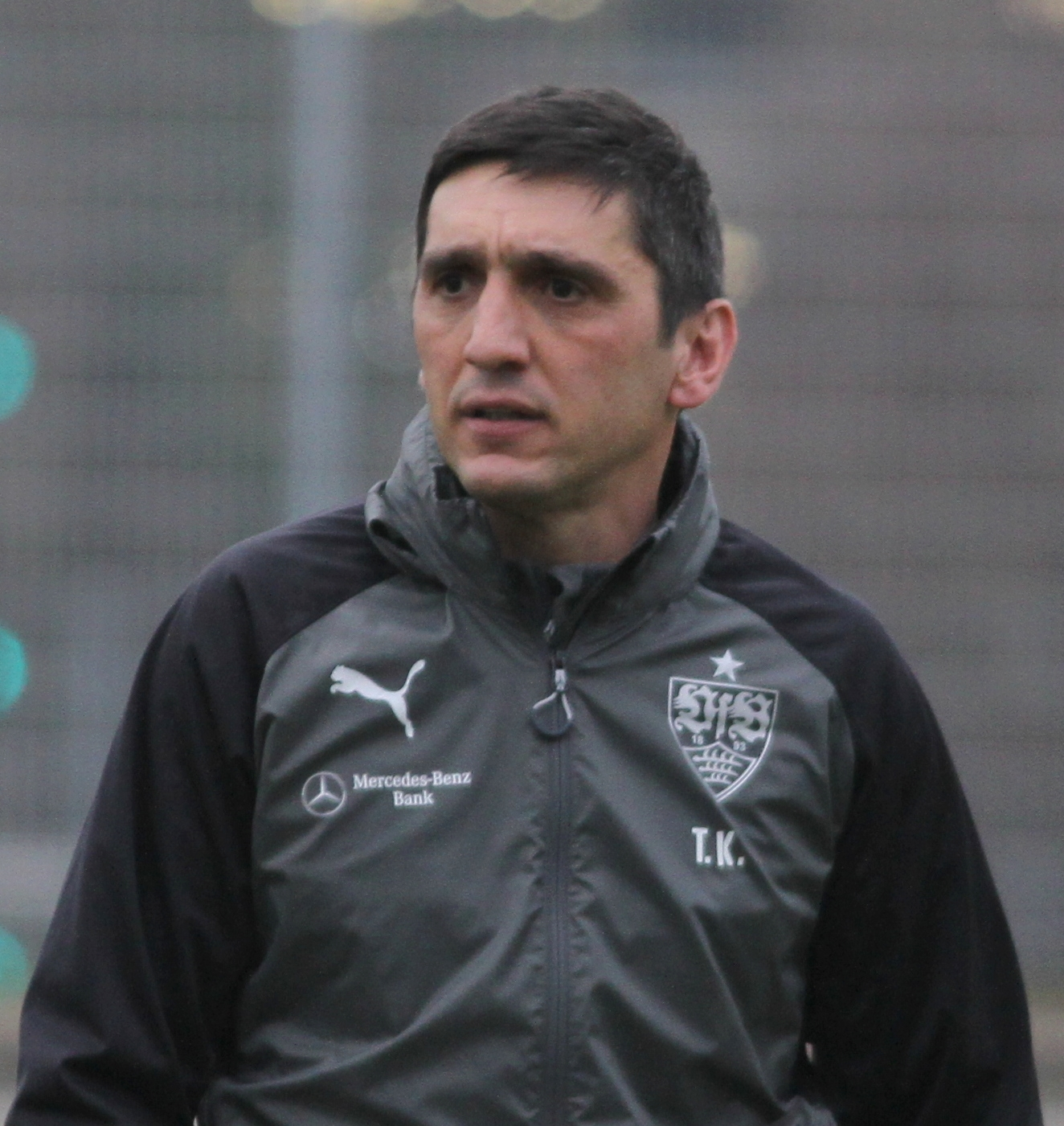
Tayfun Korkut

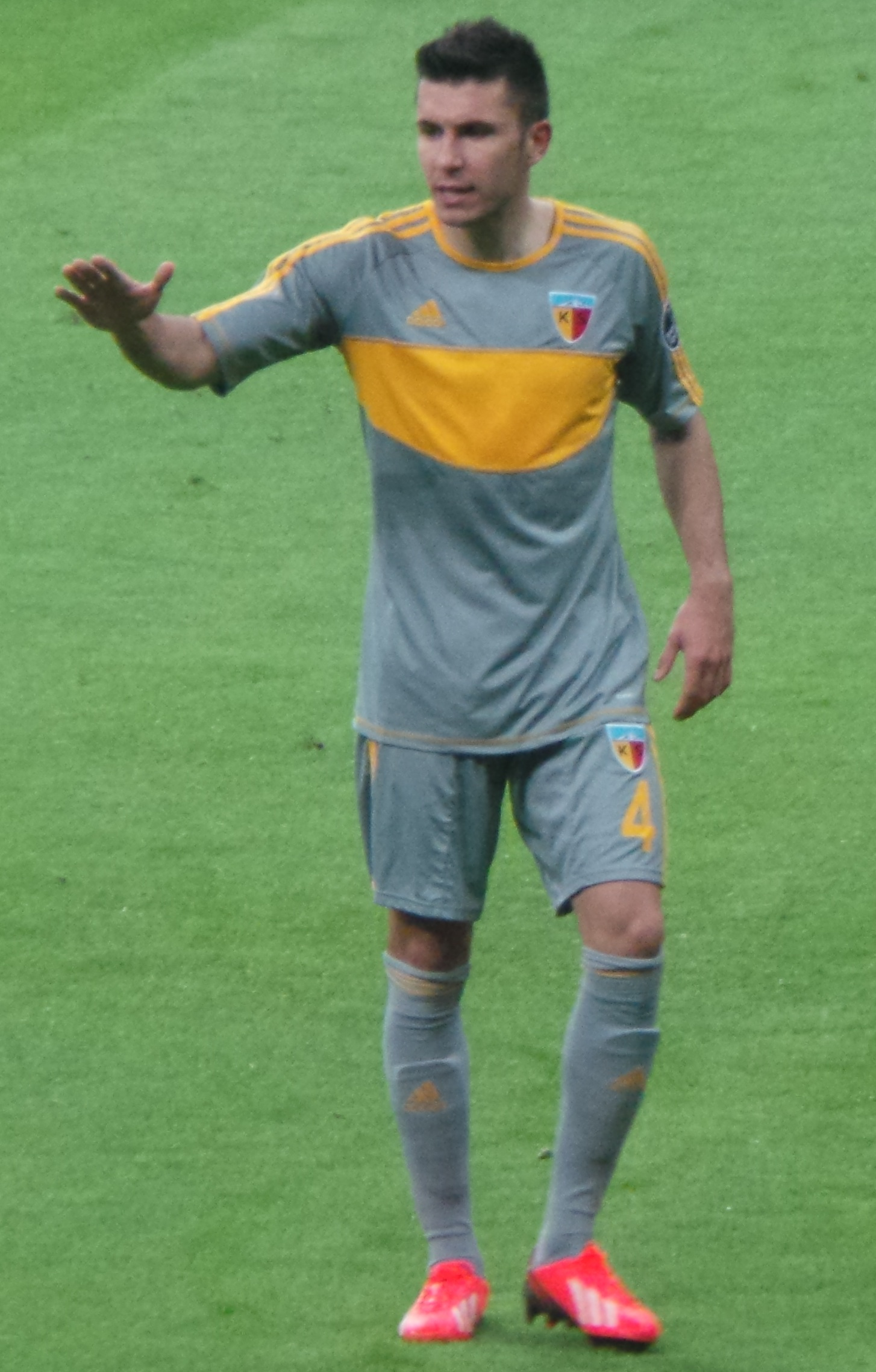
Cüneyt Köz

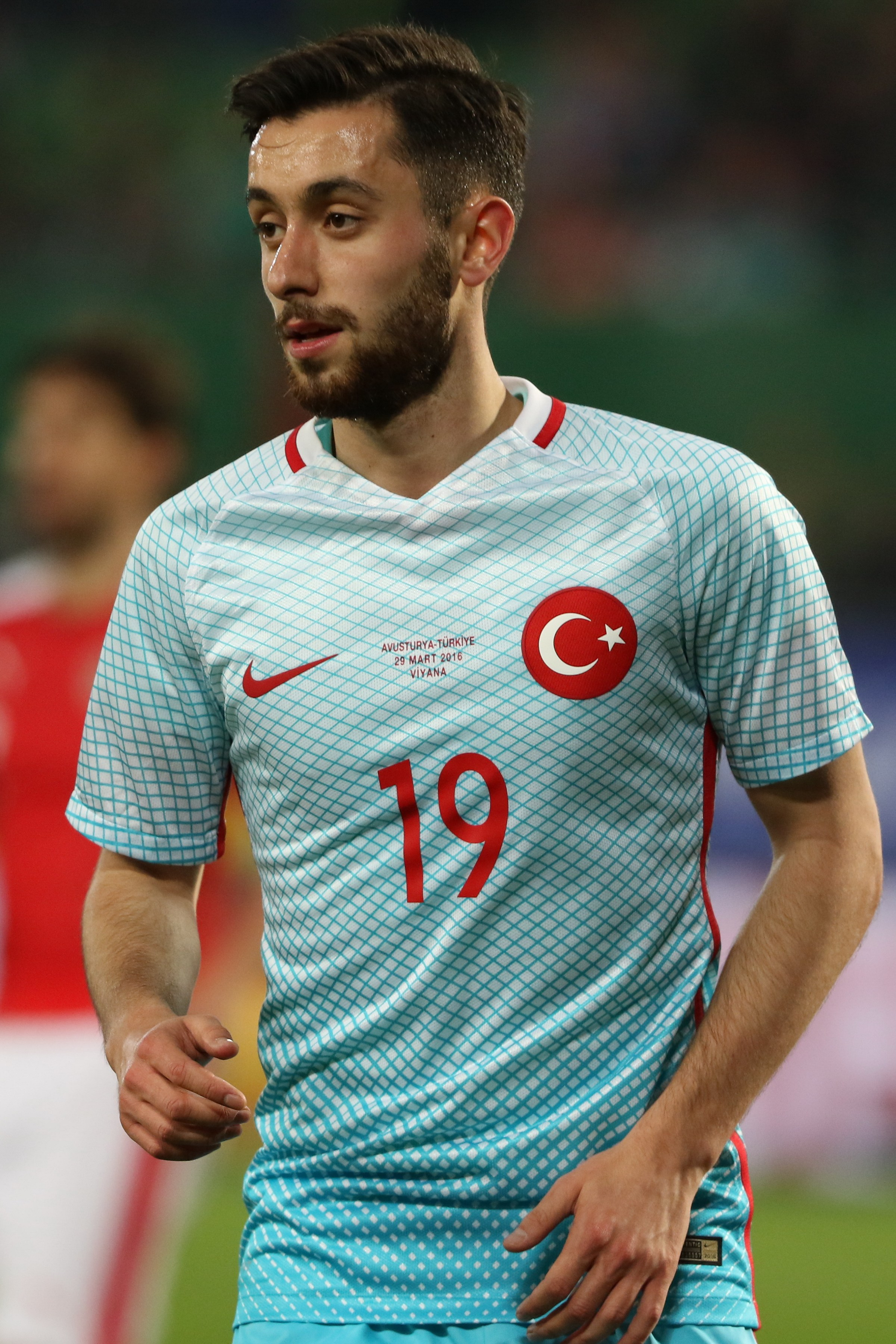
Yunus Mallı

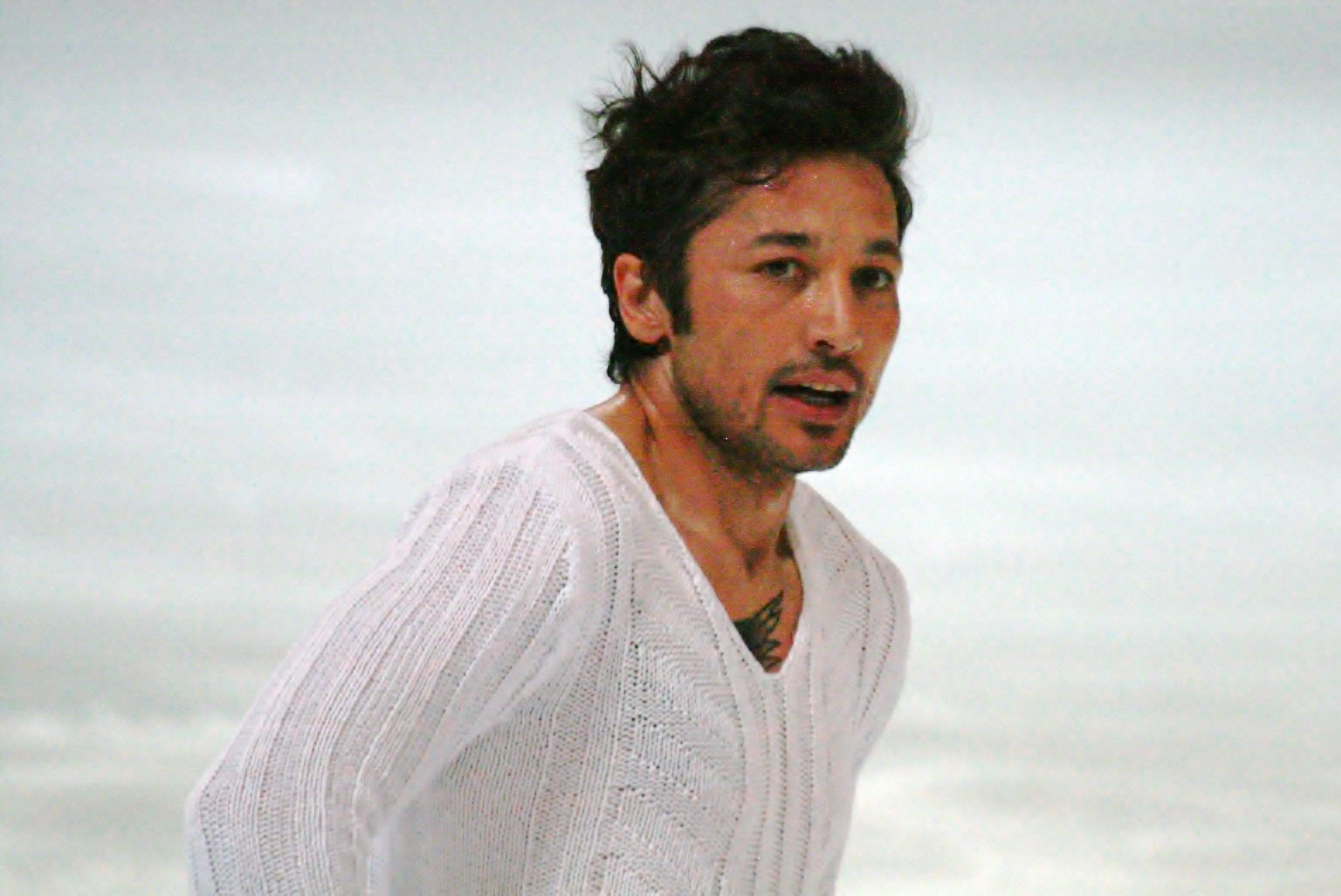
İlhan Mansız

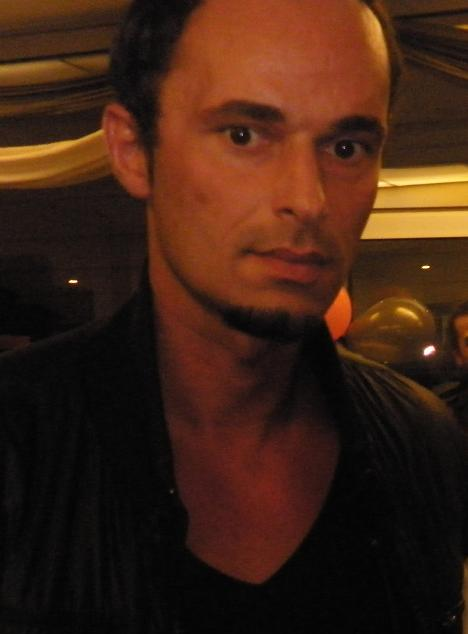
Ersen Martin

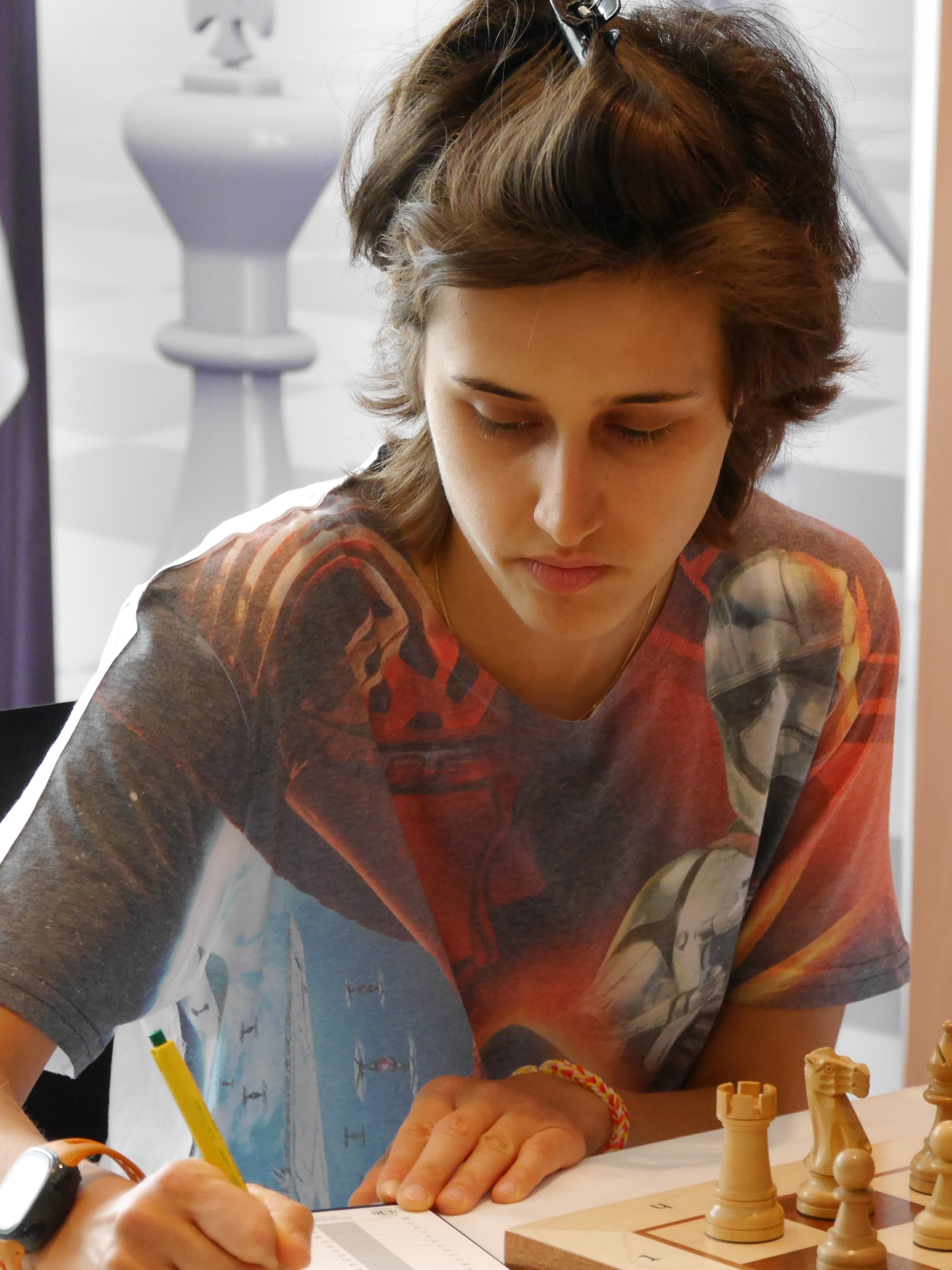
Filiz Osmanodja

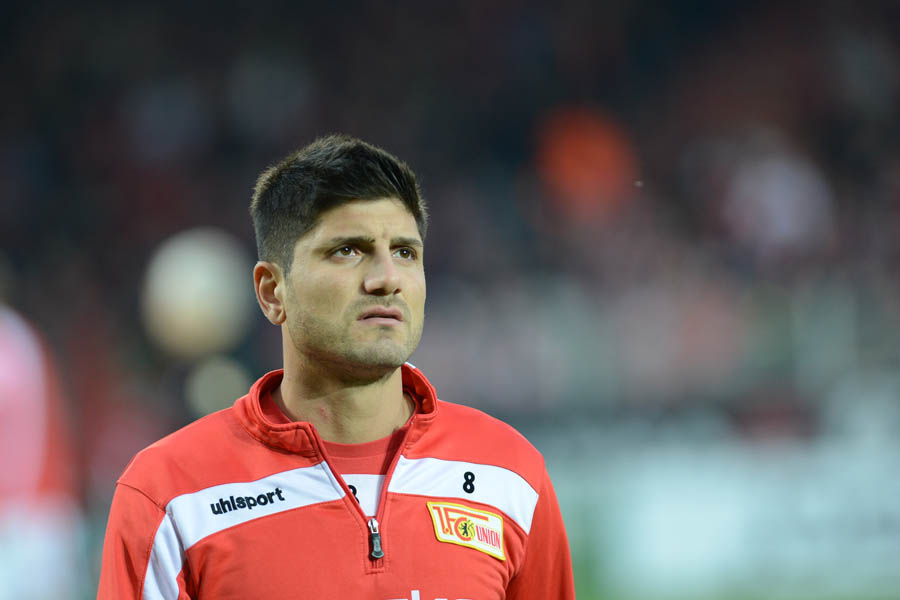
Barış Özbek

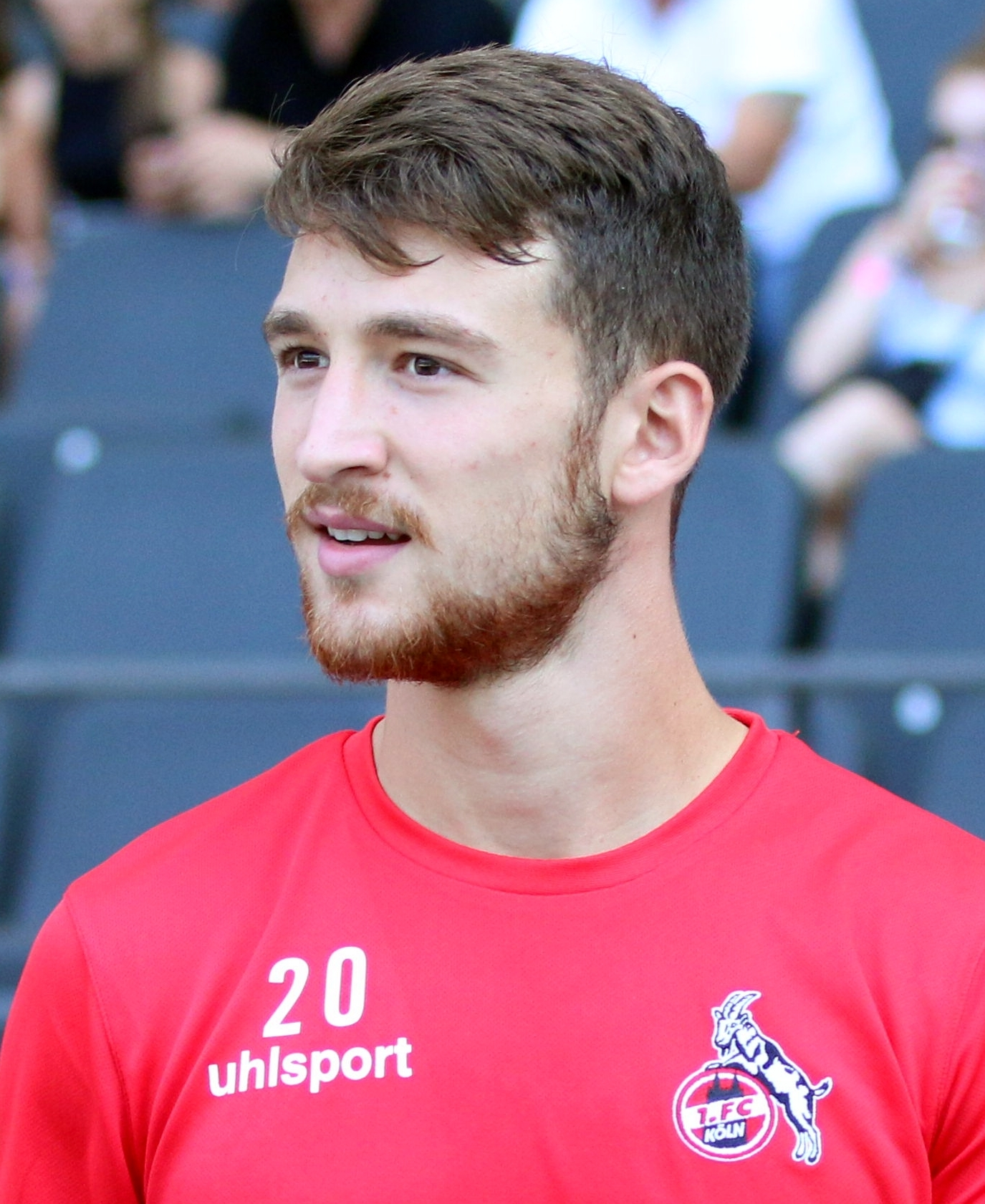
Salih Özcan

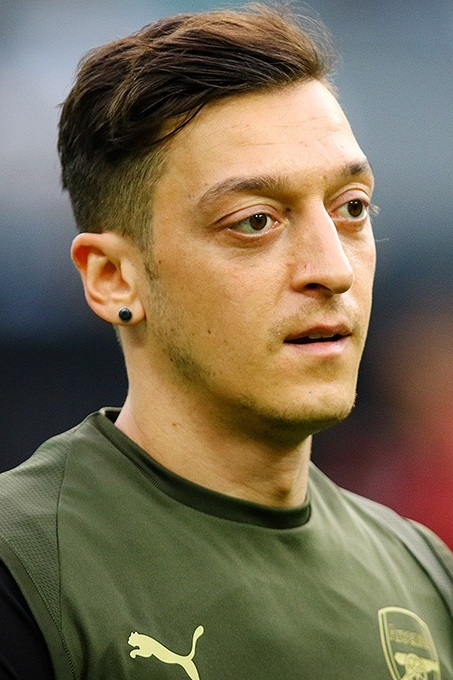
Mesut Özil

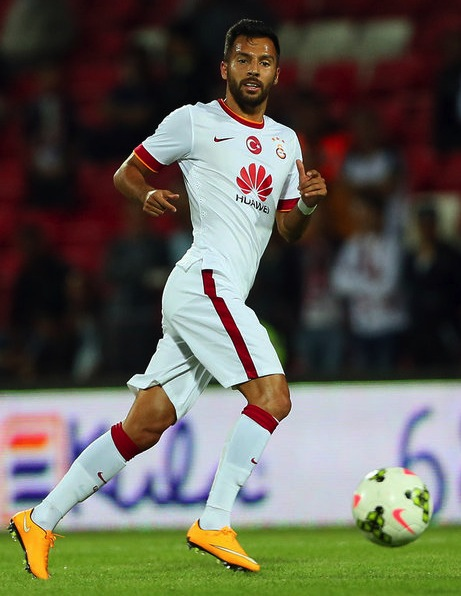
Yasin Öztekin

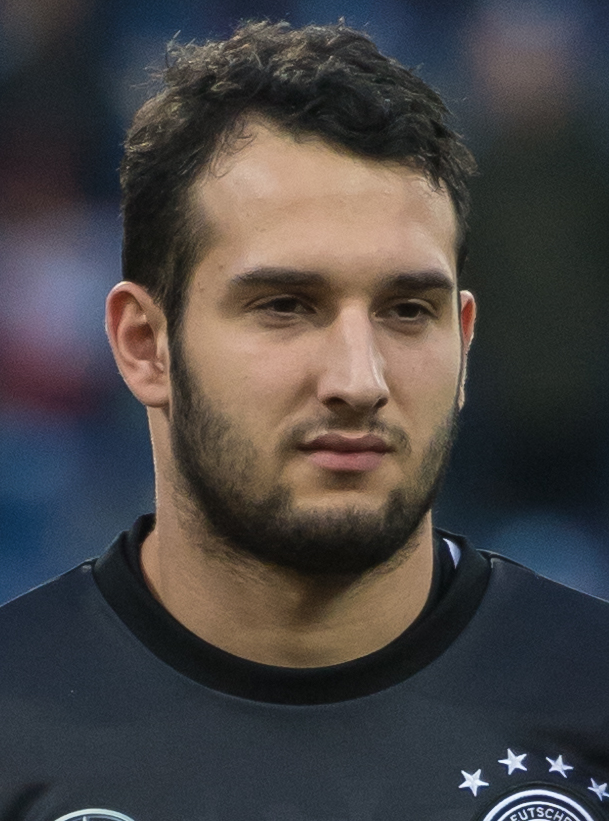
Levin Öztunalı

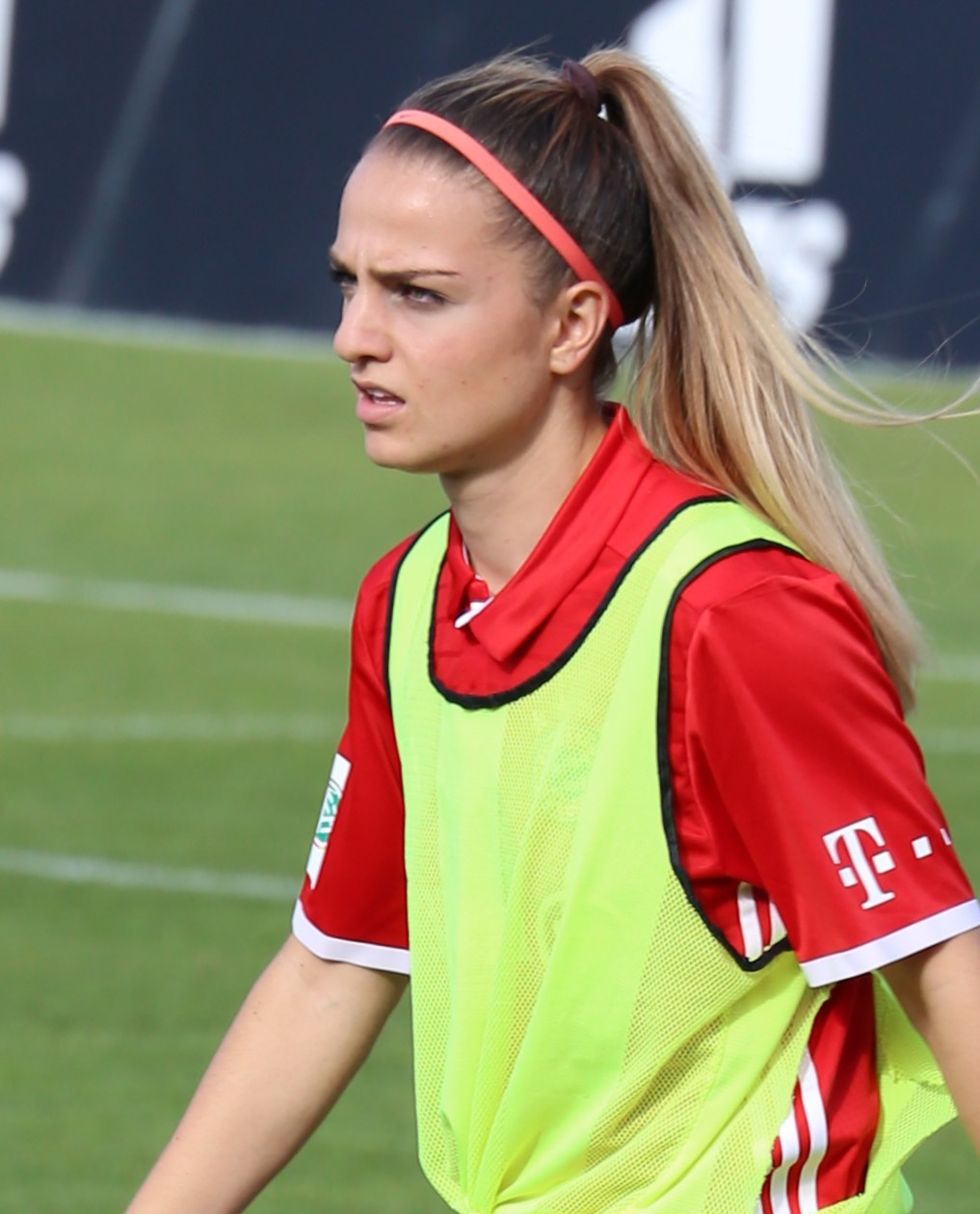
Melike Pekel

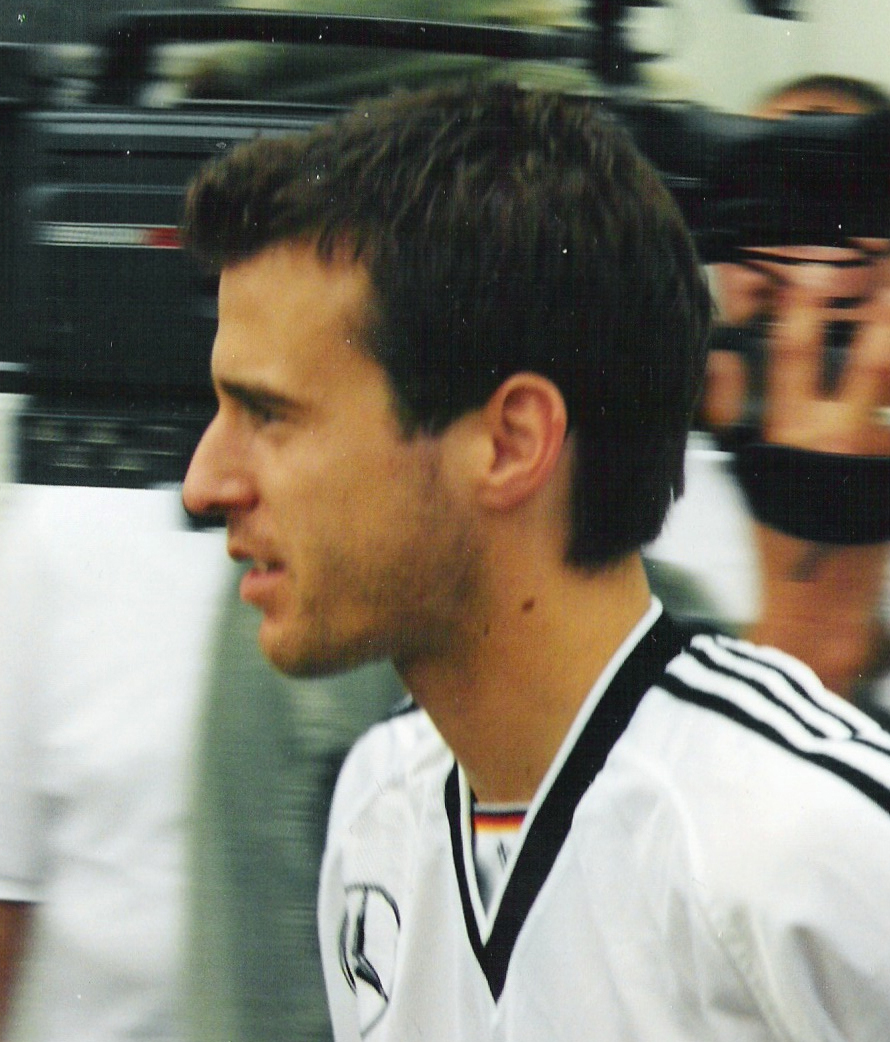
Mehmet Scholl

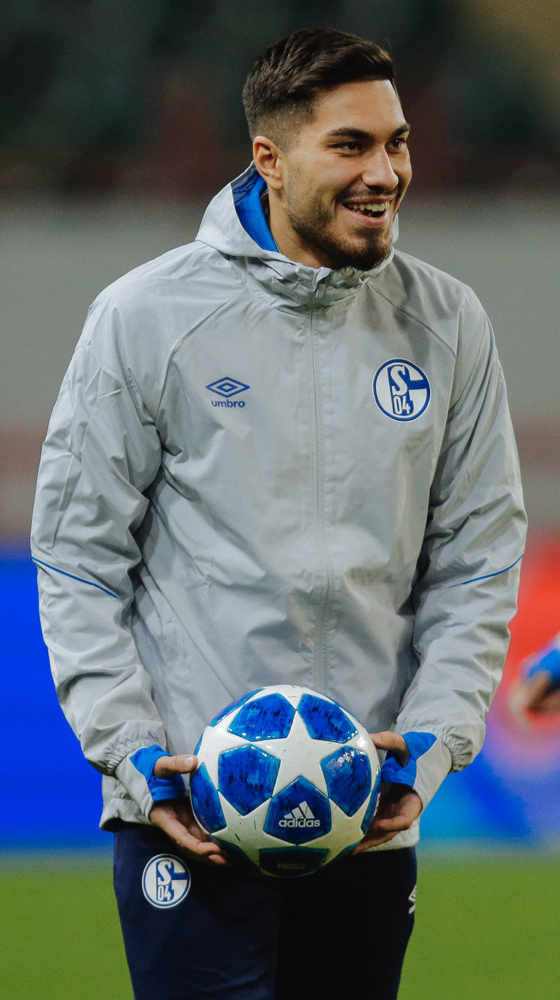
Suat Serdar

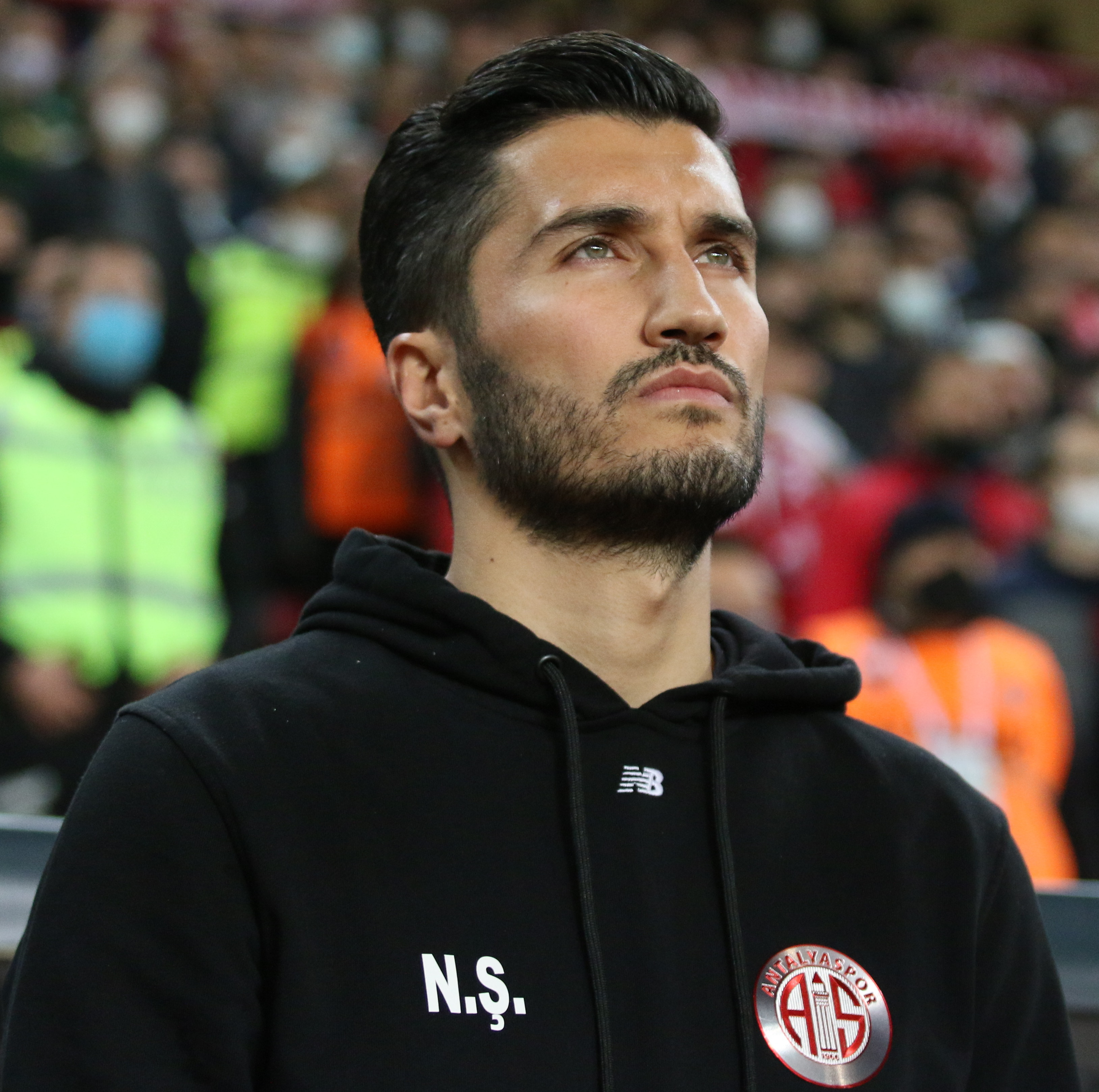
Nuri Şahin

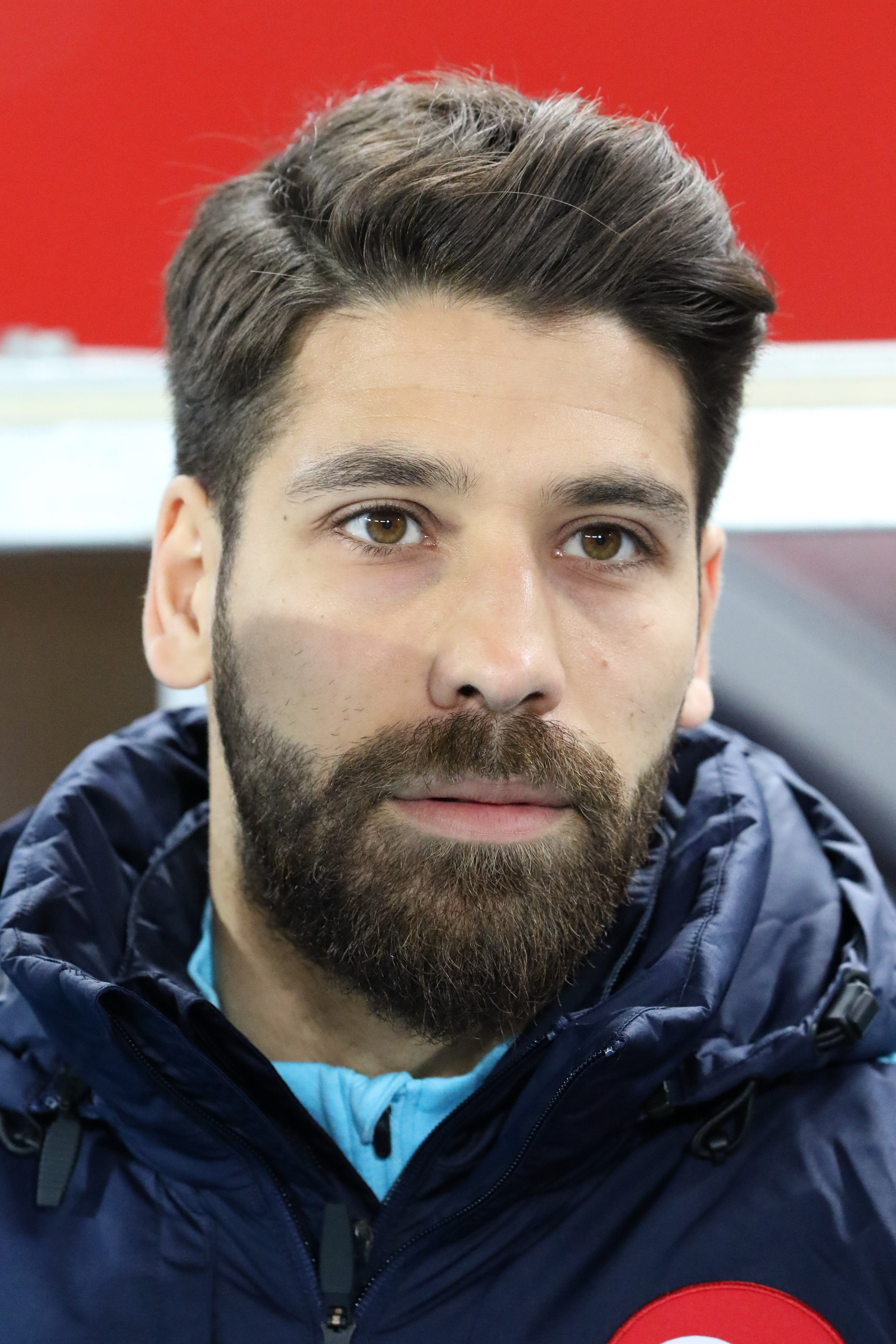
Olcay Şahan

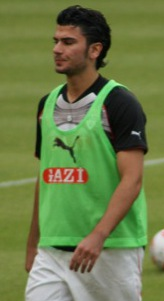
Serdar Tasci

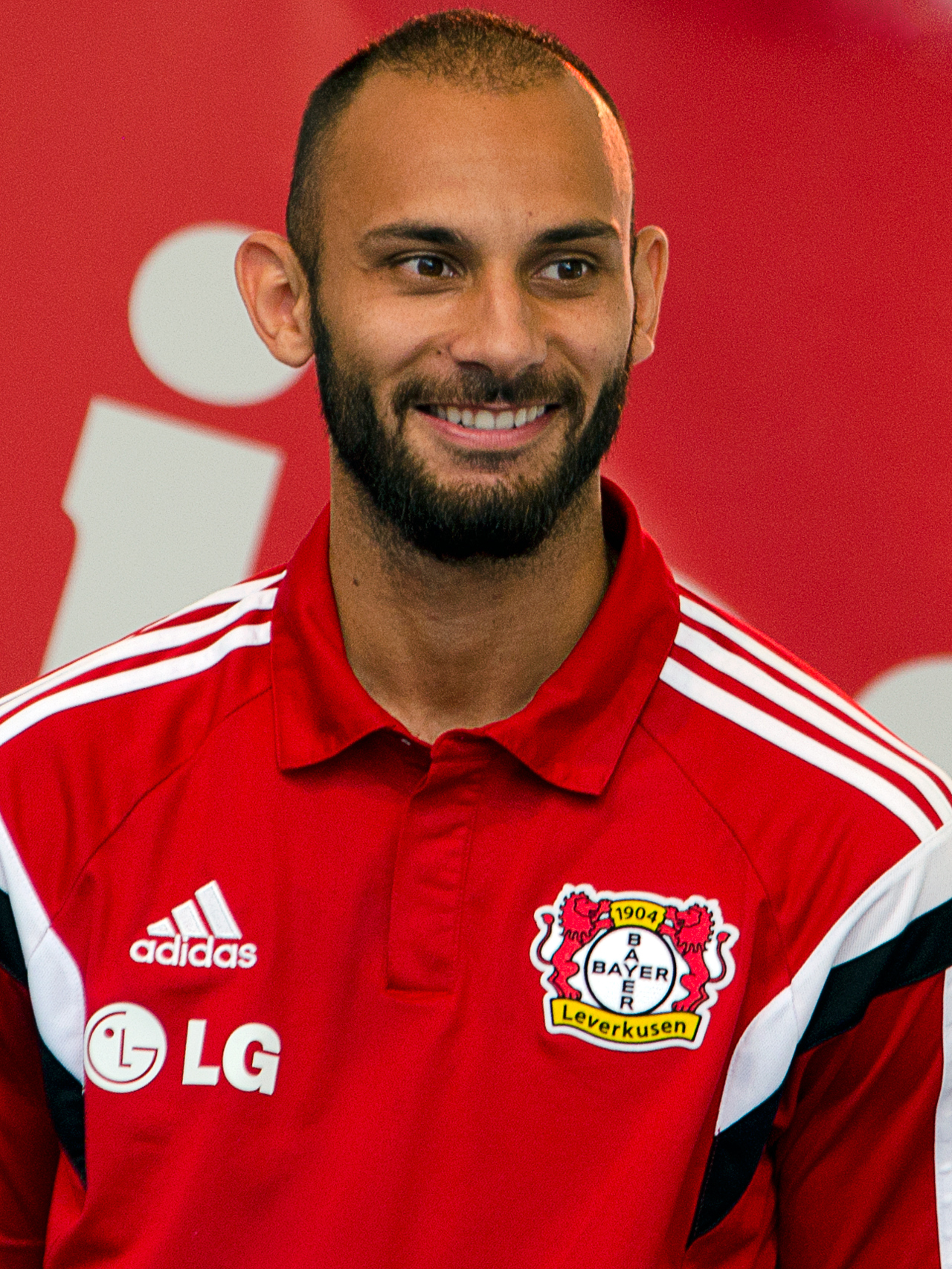
Ömer Toprak

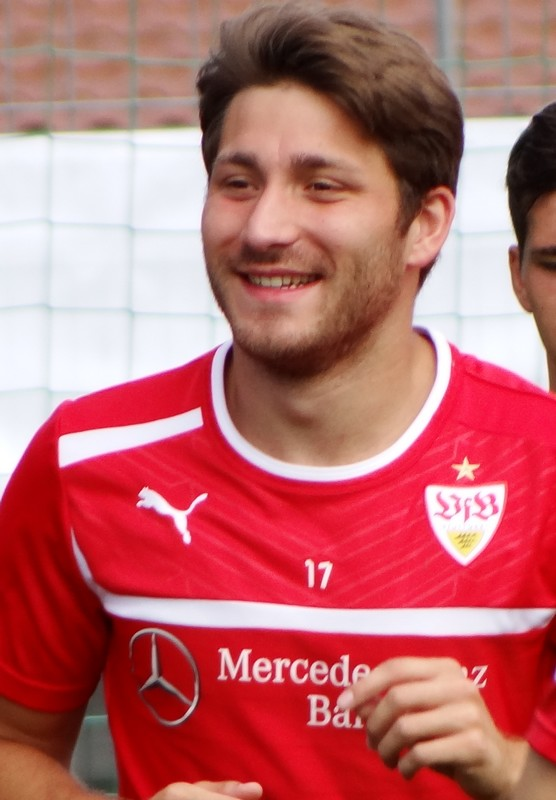
Tunay Torun

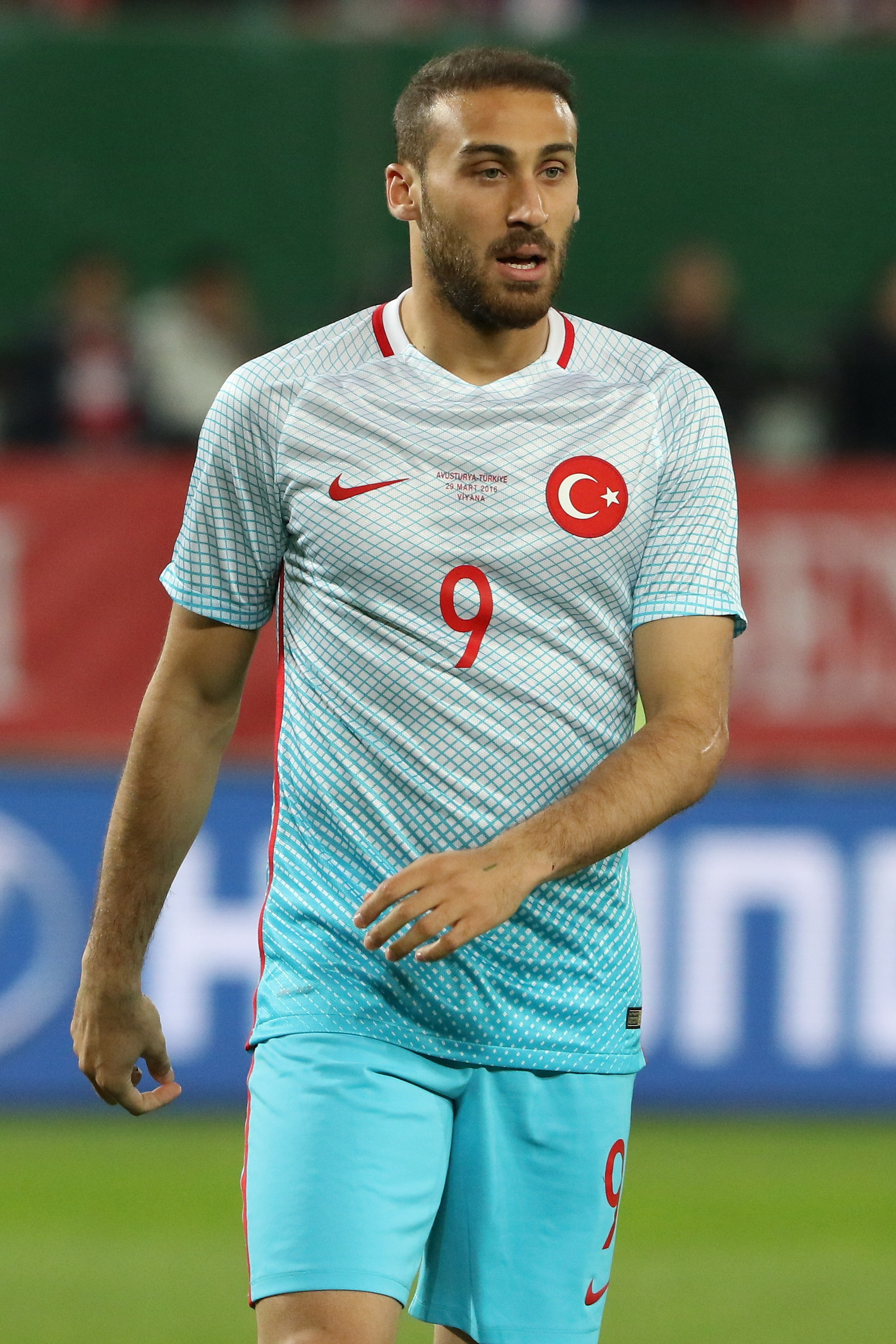
Cenk Tosun

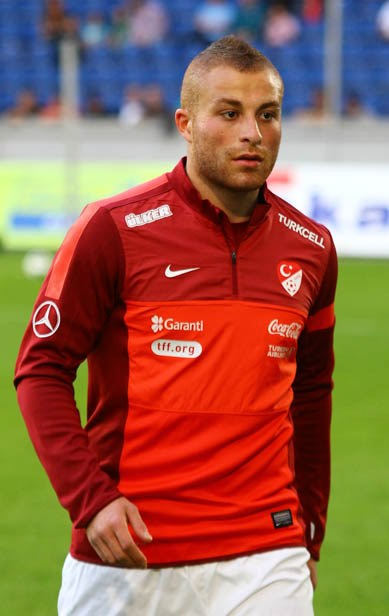
Gökhan Töre

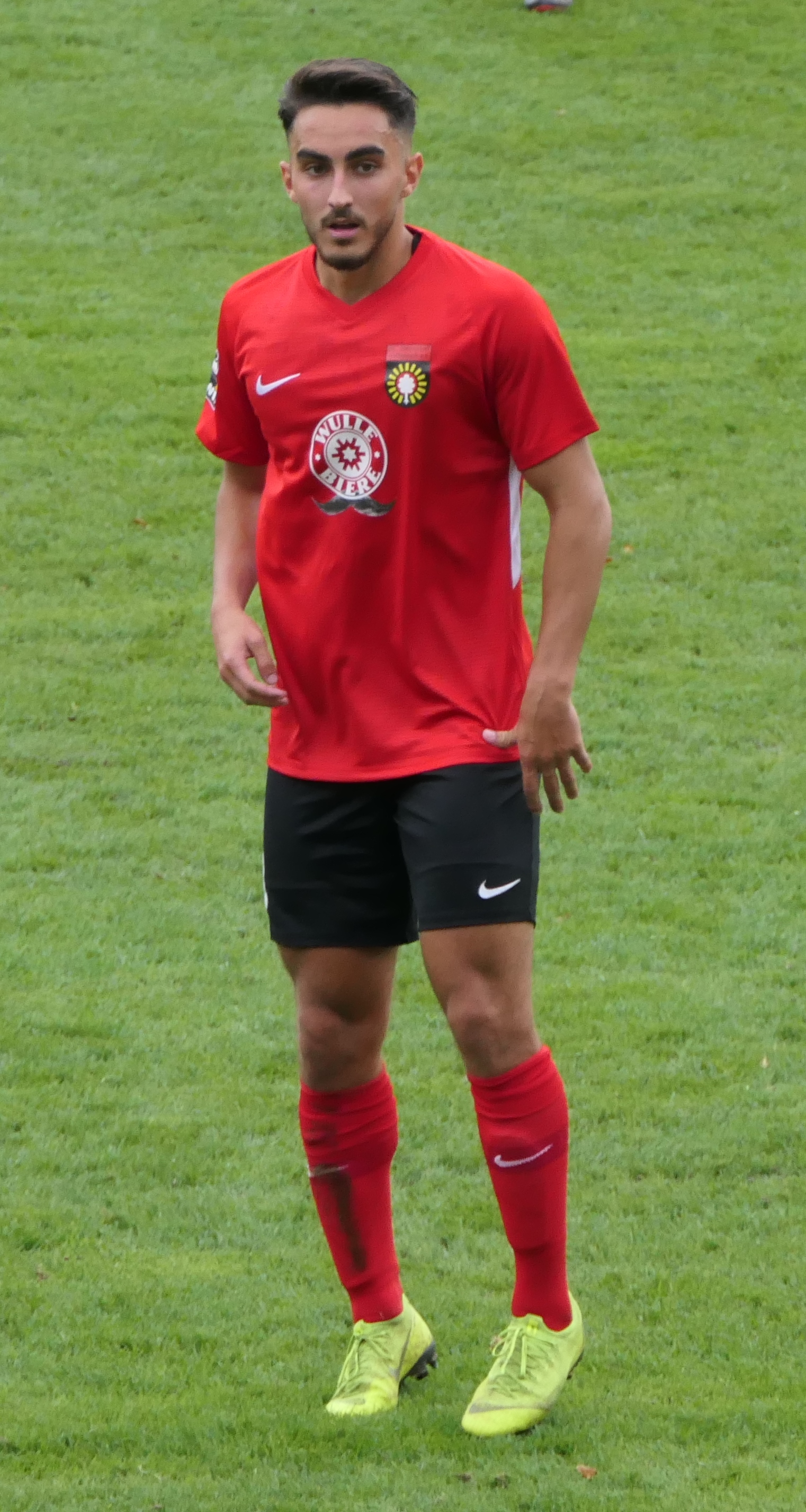
Onur Ünlüçifçi

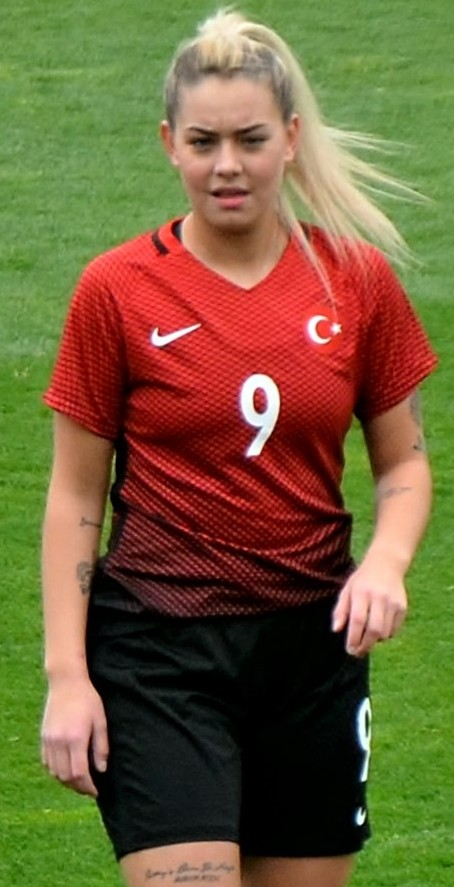
Aycan Yanaç

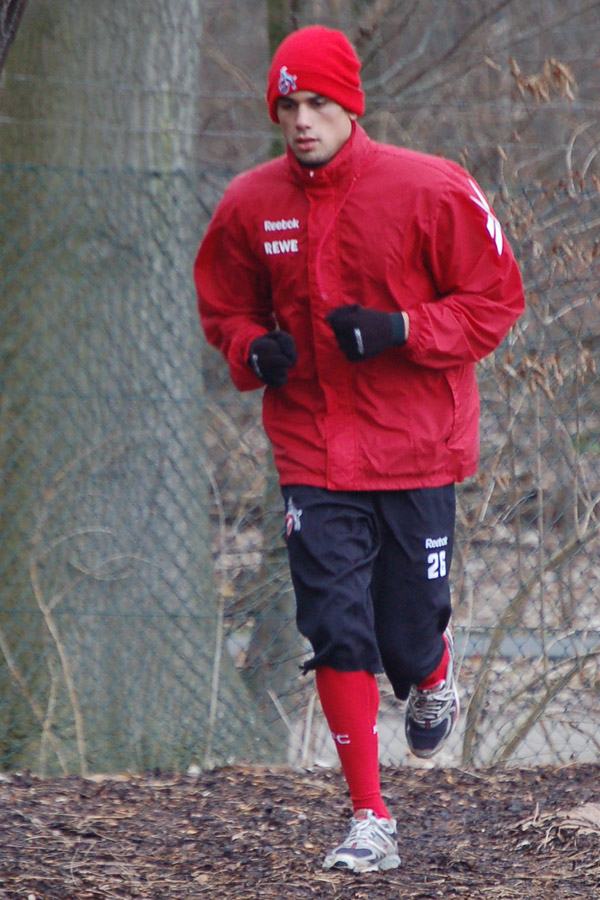
Taner Yalçın

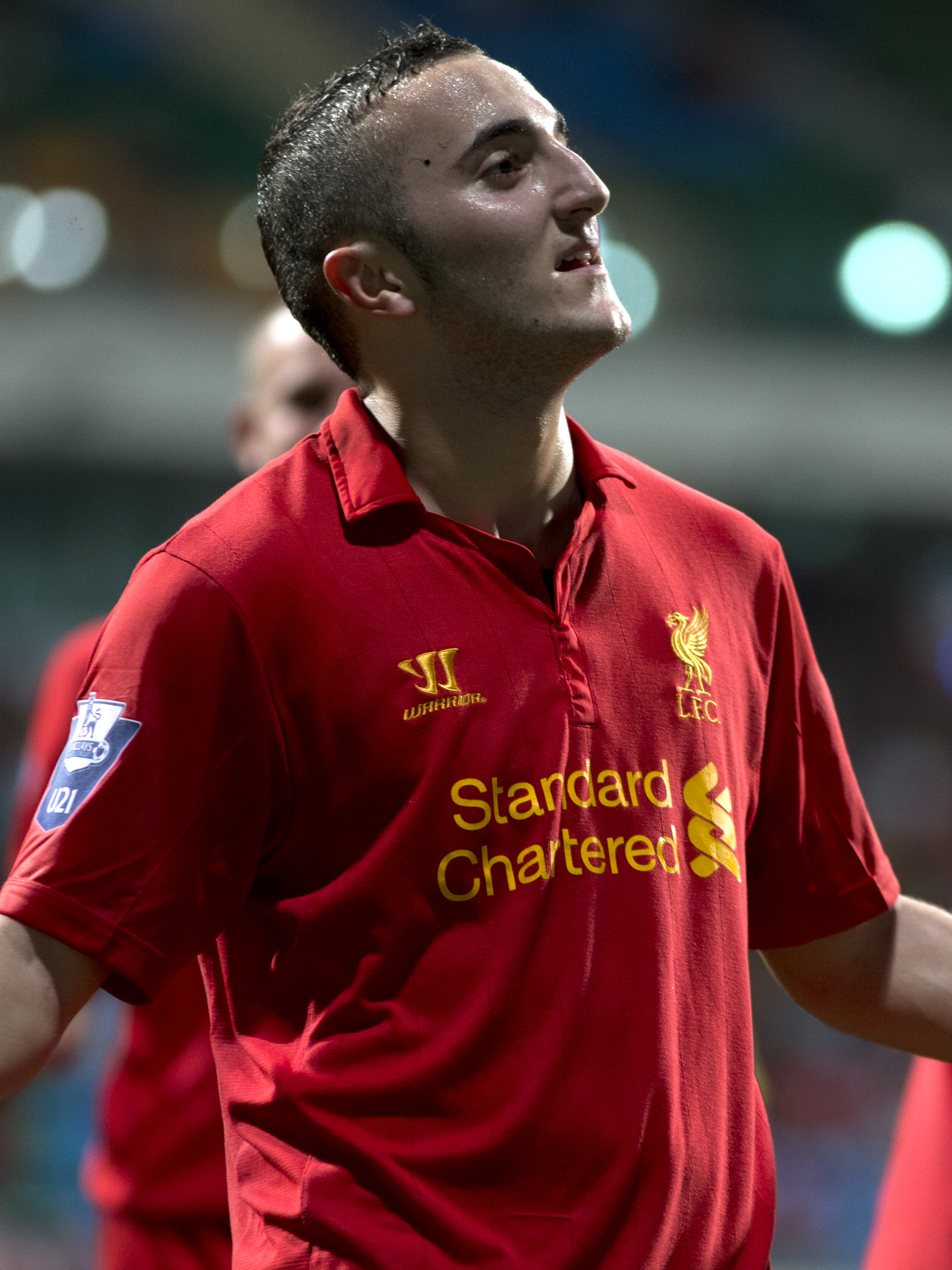
Samed Yeşil

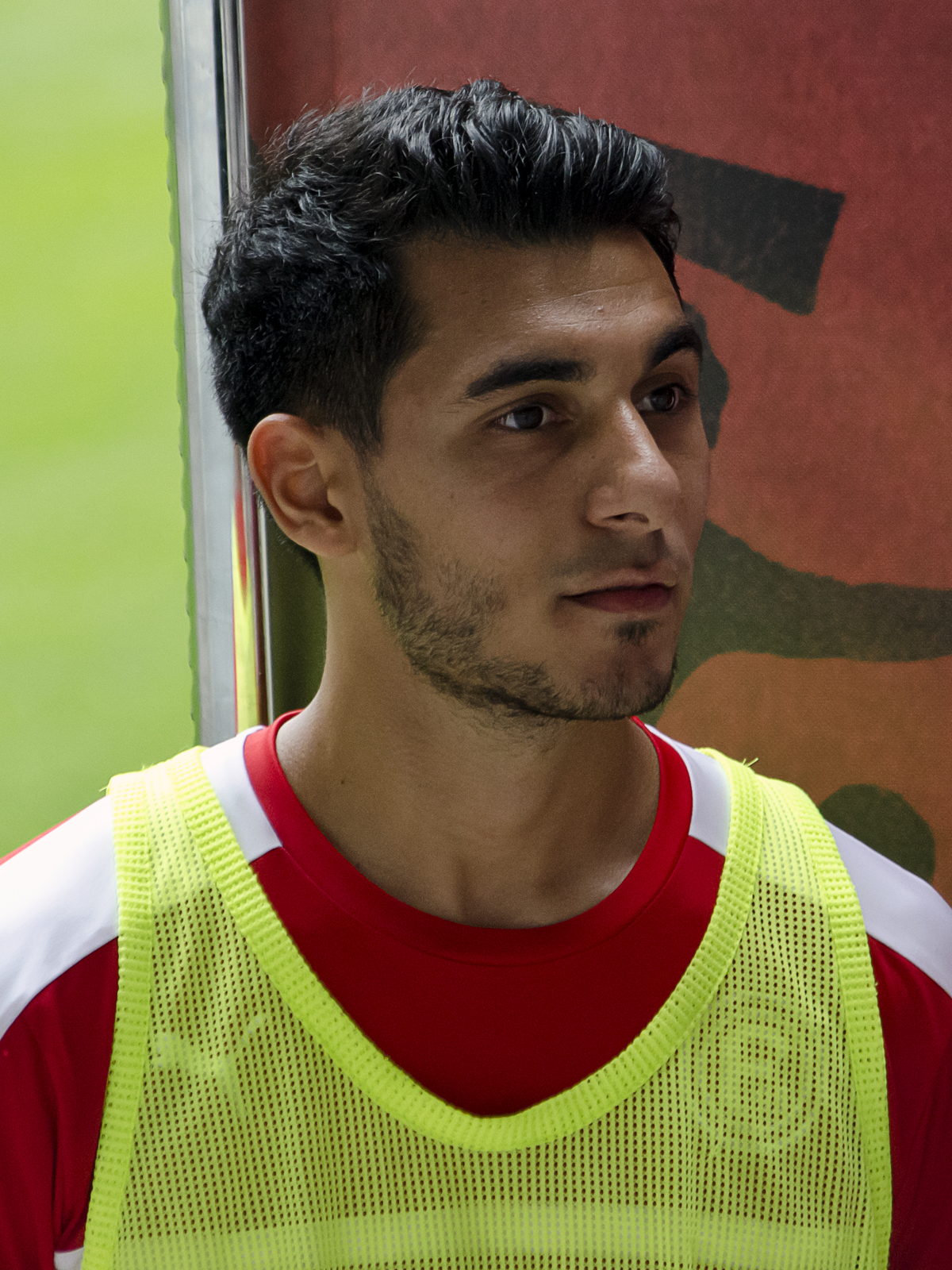
Özkan Yıldırım.

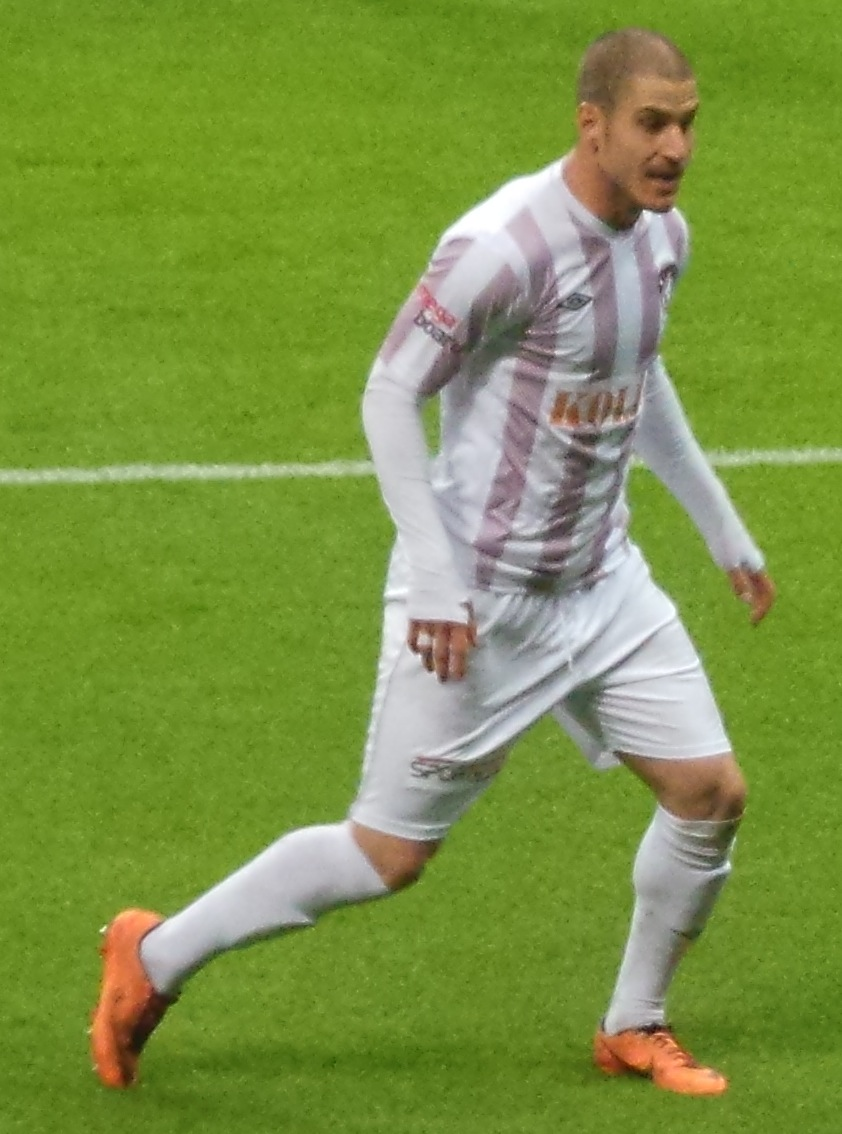
Deniz Yılmaz

- Abdulkadir Kalender, karate master
- Enes Acarbay, football player
- Tunay Açar, football player
- Berkan Afşarlı, football player
- Ertuğrul Ağca, freestyle wrestler
- Dilan Ağgül, football player
- Mahir Agva, basketball player
- Elter Akay, volleyball trainer
- Kaan Akça, football player
- Murat Akça, football player
- Alper Akçam, football player
- Sinan Akdag, ice hockey defenceman
- Aykut Akgün, football player
- Mehmet Akgün, football player
- Bilal Akgüvercin, football player
- Serhat Akın, football player
- Atakan Akkaynak, football player
- İsmet Akpınar, basketball player
- Taşkın Aksoy, football manager and former football player
- Orhan Aktaş, football player
- Birkan Akyol, boxer
- Fahri Akyol, football player
- Ufuk Akyol, football player
- Erhan Albayrak, football manager and former football player
- Uğur Albayrak, football player
- Berkan Algan, football player
- Selçuk Alibaz, football player
- Deniz Almas, sprinter (Turkish father and German mother)
- Ünal Alpuğan, football player
- Salih Altın, football player
- Volkan Altın, football player
- Koray Altınay, football player
- Tevfik Altındağ, football player
- Halil Altıntop, football player
- Hamit Altıntop, football player
- Burak Altıparmak, football player
- Drahşan Arda, world's first female football referee
- Ünsal Arik, boxer
- Furkan Ars, futsal player
- Ahmet Arslan, football player
- Ensar Arslan, football player
- Firat Arslan, boxer
- Tolgay Arslan, football player
- Volkan Arslan, football coach and former football player
- Jyhan Artut, darts player
- Hakan Aslantaş, football player
- Serkan Atak, football player
- Ismail Atalan, football manager
- Ümit Atalay, football player
- Mahmut Ataman, basketball coach
- Barış Atik, football player
- Osman Atılgan, football player
- Engin Atsür, basketball player (Turkish father and a German mother)
- Kerim Avcı, football player
- Deniz Aycicek, football player
- Levent Ayçiçek, football player (Turkish father and a German mother)
- İbrahim Aydemir, football player
- Selim Aydemir, football player
- Semih Aydilek, football player
- Anıl Aydın, football player
- Erhan Aydın, football player
- Mehmet Can Aydin, football player
- Metin Aydın (swimmer), swimmer
- Okan Aydın, football player
- Oğuzhan Aydoğan, football player
- Taylan Aydoğan, football player
- Ercan Aydogmus, football player
- Necat Aygün, football player
- Şahin Aygüneş, football player
- Kaan Ayhan, football player
- Onur Ayık, football player
- Deniz Aytekin, football referee
- Can Ayvazoğlu, volleyball player
- Bilal Aziz, football player (Turkish Lebanese origin)
- Muzaffer Bacak, karateka
- Sezer Badur, football player
- Yohannes Bahçecioğlu, football player
- Feride Bakır, football player
- Sinan Bakış, football player
- Alper Balaban, football player
- Orkan Balkan, football player
- Hakan Balta, football player
- Deniz Barış, football player
- Hakan Barış, football player
- Barbaros Barut, football player
- Atif Bashir, football player (Turkish German mother)
- Barış Başdaş, football player
- Seydihan Başlantı, football player
- Muhittin Baştürk, football player
- Yıldıray Baştürk, football player
- Malik Batmaz, football player
- Fatih Baydemir, football player
- Ensar Baykan, football player
- Mithat Bayrak, Olympic wrestler
- Durmuş Bayram, football player
- Engin Baytar, football player
- Efkan Bekiroğlu, football player
- Abdulkadir Beyazıt, football player
- Ferhat Bıkmaz, football player
- Oğuzhan Bıyık, football player
- Ali Bilgin, football player
- Burak Bilgin, football player
- Serdar Bingöl, football player
- Atilla Birlik, football player
- Murat Bosporus, wrestler
- Can Bozdoğan, football player
- Gökhan Bozkaya, football player
- Mehmet Boztepe, football player
- İsmail Budak, football player
- Pınar Budak, taekwondoin
- Ufuk Budak, football player
- Erol Bulut, football player
- Muhammed Bulut, football player
- Onur Bulut, football player
- İrfan Buz, football manager and former football player
- Kerem Bülbül, football player
- Marvin Sinan Büyüksakarya, football player
- Emre Can, football player
- Görkem Can, football player
- Müslüm Can, football player
- Ahmet Canbaz, football player
- Fatih Candan, football player
- Mehmet Cankurt, pool player
- Erdem Canpolat, football player
- Onur Capin, football player
- Ahmet Cebe, football player
- Selina Cerci, football player
- Gülhiye Cengiz, football player
- Hakan Cengiz, football coach and former football player
- Serkan Cetin, bodybuilder
- Ali Ceylan, football player
- Erol Ceylan, boxer
- Ismail Cilingir, kickboxer
- Tolcay Ciğerci, football player
- Tolga Ciğerci, football player
- Daniyel Cimen, football manager and football player
- Hülya Cin, football player
- Can Coşkun, football player
- Ecem Cumert, football player
- Ahmet Çakıcı, wrestler
- Hamza Çakır, football player
- Hakan Çalhanoğlu, football player
- Kerim Çalhanoğlu, football player
- Muhammed Çalhanoğlu, football player
- Serkan Çalık, football player
- Taşkın Çalış, football player
- Gökhan Çalışal, football player
- Kaan Çaliskaner, football player
- Nizamettin Çalışkan, football player
- Halet Çambel, fencer; the first Muslim woman to compete in the Olympic Games
- Tarık Çamdal, football player
- Ali Çamdalı, football player
- Burak Çamoğlu, football player
- Haydar Çekırdek, football player
- Volkan Çekirdek, football player
- Ekin Çelebi, football player
- Erdal Çelik, football player
- Haşim Çelik, taekwondo practitioner
- Mete Çelik, football player
- Musa Çelik, football player
- Neco Çelik, football player
- Okan Aydın
- Serdal Çelebi, football player; he was the first blind footballer to score the goal of the month in August 2018
- Süleyman Çelikyurt, football player
- Onur Çenik, football player
- Ferhat Çerçi, football player
- Aydın Çetin, football player
- Berk Çetin, football player
- Şahverdi Çetin, football player
- Musa Çiçek, taekwondo athlete
- Hikmet Çiftçi, football player
- Orkan Çınar, football player
- Şamil Çinaz, football player
- Yusuf Çoban, football player
- Bilal Çubukçu, football player
- Berkay Dabanlı, football player
- Ümit Davala, assistant manager of Galatasaray S.K. and former football player
- Fatih Dayik, e-athlete
- Gülşen Degener, carom billiards player
- Ercan Demir, bodybuilder
- Ersin Demir, football coach and former football player
- Mete Kaan Demir, football player
- Levent Demiray, football player
- Kerem Demirbay, football player
- Sezai Demircan, football player
- Oğuzhan Demirci, football player
- Mithat Demirel, basketball player
- Yeşim Demirel, football player
- Ünal Demirkıran, football player
- Uğur Demirkol, football player
- Ahmet Dereli, football player
- Okan Derici, football player
- Volkan Dikmen, football player
- Cem Dinç, basketball player
- Eren Dinkçi, football player
- Selin Dişli, football player
- Abdullah Doğan, football player
- Deniz Doğan, football player
- Hüzeyfe Doğan, football player
- İshak Doğan, football player
- Muhammed Ali Doğan, football player
- Mustafa Doğan, football player
- Pakize Gözde Dökel, football player
- Sara Doorsoun, football player (Turkish mother and Iranian father)
- Murat Doymus, football player
- Taylan Duman, football player
- Uğur Dündar (footballer), football player
- Burcu Düner, football player
- Fatih Duran, football player
- İlkay Durmuş, football player
- Ahmet Dursun, football player
- Serdar Dursun, football player
- Kasim Edebali, American football player (Turkish German mother and African American father)
- Cem Efe, football manager and former football player
- Hasan Egilmez, football manager
- Volkan Eğri, football player
- Yasin Ehliz, ice hockey player
- Mehmet Ekici, football player
- Volkan Ekici, football player
- Baris Ekincier, football player
- Ahmet Engin, football player
- Ekrem Engin, football player
- Tuğrul Erat, football player
- Aykut Erçetin, football player
- Alparslan Erdem, football player
- Hakan Erdem, futsal player
- Lena Erdil, windsurfer (Turkish father and German mother)
- Okan Erdoğan, football player
- Ömer Erdoğan, football player
- Ümit Ergirdi, football player
- Helga Nadire İnan Ertürk, football player
- Sertan Eser, football player
- Pierre Esser, football player
- Muhsin Ertuğral, football manager
- Erkan Eyibil, football player
- Malik Fathi, football player (Turkish father and German mother)
- Cem Felek, football player
- Engin Fırat, football manager
- Serkan Fırat, football player
- Benjamin Fuchs, football player (Turkish mother and Austrian father)
- Aytürk Geçim, futsal and football player
- Emrehan Gedikli, football player
- Turgay Gemicibasi, football player
- Koray Gençerler, football referee
- Ayhan Gezen, football player
- Serkan Göcer, football player
- Ali Gökdemir, football player
- Berkant Göktan, football player
- Turgay Gölbaşı, football player
- Anil Gözütok, football player
- Lukas Gottwalt, football player
- Sergio Gucciardo, football player (Turkish father and Italian mother)
- Dilaver Güçlü, football player
- Faruk Gül, football player
- Gökhan Gül, football player
- Kaan Gül, football player
- Bilal Gülden, football player
- Rabia Gülec, Olympic taekwondo practitioner
- Tahir Güleç, Olympic taekwondo practitioner
- Semih Güler, football player
- Andaç Güleryüz, football player
- Ceyhun Gülselam, football player
- Neşat Gülünoğlu, football player
- Sinan Gümüş, football player
- Gökhan Gümüşsu, football player
- İlkay Gündoğan, football player
- Selim Gündüz, football player
- Berkant Güner, football player
- Çetin Güner, football player
- Ali Güneş, football player
- Serdar Güneş, football player
- Umut Güneş, football player
- Şaban Genişyürek, football player
- Mustafa Güngör, rugby player
- Koray Günter, football player
- Emre Güral, football player
- Özhan Gürel, basketball coach
- Ahmet Gürleyen, football player
- Cenk Güvenç, football player
- Günay Güvenç, football player
- Sercan Güvenışık, football player
- Deniz Harbertde, football player
- Tayfur Havutçu, football player
- Özer Hurmacı, football player
- Fatma Işık, football player
- Cem Islamoglu, football player
- Şenol İbişi, football player
- Adnan İlgin, football player
- Uğur İnceman, football player
- Cenk İşler, football player
- Deniz Kadah, football player
- Cagatay Kader, football player
- Hasan Ali Kaldırım, football player
- Engin Kalender, football player
- Fuat Kalkan, football player
- Gurbet Kalkan, football player
- Murat Kalkan, football player
- Ömer Faruk Kalmış, football player
- Özge Kanbay, football player
- Kudret Kanoğlu, football player
- Burak Kaplan, football player
- Sinan Kaplan, football player
- Cihan Kaptan, football player
- Fatma Kara, football player
- Mehmet Kara, football player
- Arzu Karabulut, football player
- Aydın Karabulut, football player
- Cem Karaca, football player
- Çengiz Karaça, carambola player
- Bora Karadag, football player
- Timur Karagülmez, football player
- Kenan Karaman, football player
- Burak Karan, football player (Turkish Syrian origin)
- Ümit Karan, football manager and former football player
- Arif Karaoğlan, football player
- Atakan Karazor, football player
- Özgür Kart, football player
- Sinan Karweina, football player
- Yusuf Kasal, football player
- Fatih Kaya, football player
- Güngör Kaya, football player
- Hasan Kaya, football player
- Hülya Kaya, football player
- Saffet Kaya, football player
- Nurettin Kayaoğlu, football player
- Hasret Kayikçi, football player
- Burhanettin Kaymak, football player
- Oğuzhan Kefkir, football player
- Umut Kekıllı, football player
- Avni Kertmen, badminton
- Erdal Keser, football player
- Polat Keser, football player
- Serdar Kesimal, football player
- Fuat Kılıç, football manager and former football player
- Erdal Kılıçaslan, football player
- Fatih Kıran, football player
- Ferhat Kıskanç, football player
- Menduh Kızılkula, wrestler
- Lucky Kid, wrestler
- Muhammed Kiprit, football player
- Abdul Kizmaz, football player
- Bertul Kocabaş, football player
- Kenan Kocak, football player
- Yasin Kocatepe, football player
- Cengiz Koç, heavyweight boxer
- Filiz Koç, football player
- Süleyman Koç, football player
- Celaleddin Koçak, football player
- Guido Koçer, football player
- Umut Koçin, football player
- Özkan Koçtürk, football player
- Çağla Korkmaz, football player
- Serhat Koruk, football player
- Tayfun Korkut, football player
- Timur Kosovalı, football player
- Serhat Kot, football player
- Bahattin Köse, football player
- Tevfik Köse, football player
- Pekin Köşnek, football player
- Cüneyt Köz, football player
- Oktay Kuday, football player
- Ahmet Kulabas, football player
- Burakcan Kunt, football player
- Mehmet Kurt, football player
- Okan Kurt, football player
- Sinan Kurt (1995), football player
- Sinan Kurt (born 1996), football player
- Ahmet Kuru, football player
- Büşra Kuru, football player
- Taygun Kuru, football player
- Ahmed Kutucu, football player
- Abdurrahman Kuyucu, football player
- Mert Kuyucu, football player
- Mustafa Kuzu, football player
- Enes Küç, football player
- Gökhan Lekesiz, football player
- Yunus Mallı, football player
- İlhan Mansız, football player
- Sümeyye Manz, Olympic taekwondo practitioner
- Erkan Martin, football player
- Ersen Martin, football player
- Cemil Mengi, football player
- Levent Mercan, football player
- Patrick Mölzl, football player (Turkish father and German mother)
- Emre Nefiz, football player
- Ünal Noyan, football player
- Faruk Namdar, football player
- Ali Odabas, football player
- Barış Odabaş, football player
- Muhayer Oktay, football player
- Volkan Okumak, football player
- Samed Onur, football player
- Mahir Oral, boxer
- Selin Oruz, field hockey player
- Timur Oruz, field hockey player
- Filiz Osmanodja, chess player (Turkish Bulgarian origin)
- Yasin Ozan, football player
- Erhan Önal, football player
- Barış Örücü, football player
- Noyan Öz, football player
- Barış Özbek, football player
- Ufuk Özbek, football player
- Metin Özbey, glider pilot
- Selahattin Özbir, football player
- Berkay Özcan, football player
- Salih Özcan, football player
- Furkan Özçal, football player
- Özgür Özdemir, football player
- Gökalp Özekler, boxer
- Hicran Özen, basketball player
- Ahmet Öner, boxer
- Aykut Özer, football player
- Deniz Özer, football player
- Abdulkadir Özgen, football player
- Timur Özgöz, football player
- Mesut Özil, football player
- Can Özkan, football player
- Mustafa Özkan, football player
- Cihan Özkara, football player
- Yasin Öztekin, football player
- Levin Öztunalı, football player (Turkish father and German mother)
- Aykut Öztürk, football player
- Emre Öztürk, football player
- Erdal Öztürk, football player
- Erkan Öztürk, football player
- Kurtulus Öztürk, football player
- Sezer Öztürk, football player
- Tanju Öztürk, football player
- Teoman Öztürk, basketball player
- Ali Pala, football player
- Mustafa Parmak, football player
- Melike Pekel, football player
- Tayfun Pektürk, football player
- Deniz Pero, football player
- İris Rosenberger, Olympic swimmer (Turkish mother and German father)
- Jasmin Rosenberger, swimmer (Turkish mother and German father)
- Kemal Rüzgar, football player
- Erol Sabanov, football player (Turkish Bulgarian origin)
- Ahmet Sağlam, football player
- Görkem Sağlam, football player
- Murat Sağlam, football player
- Mahir Sağlık, football player
- Furkan Sağman, football player
- Fatma Şakar. football player
- Murat Salar, football manager and former football player
- Nazım Sangaré, football player (Turkish mother and Guinean father)
- Sercan Sararer, football player
- Sedal Sardan, basketball player
- Adem Sarı, football player
- Halil Savran, football player
- Tekin Sazlog, football player
- Caner Schmitt, football player
- Lucas Scholl, football player (Turkish German father and German mother)
- Mehmet Scholl, football player (Turkish father and German mother)
- Fikriye Selen, boxer
- Suat Serdar, football player
- Mehmet Sin, football player
- Yusuf Soysal, football player
- Rahman Soyudoğru, football player
- Kubilay Sönmez, football player
- Muhammet Sözer, futsal and football player
- Fırat Suçsuz, football player
- Dilara Özlem Sucuoğlu, football player
- Aytaç Sulu, football player
- Abdullah Elyasa Süme, football player
- Asiye Özlem Şahin, boxer
- Hülya Şahin, boxer
- Kenan Şahin, football player
- Nuri Şahin, football player
- Olcay Şahan, football player
- Selçuk Şahin, football player
- Sinan Şamil Sam, heavyweight boxer
- Busem Şeker, football player
- Eren Şen, football player
- Utku Şen, football player
- Ömer Şişmanoğlu, football player
- Turgay Tapu, football player
- Varol Tasar, football player
- Serdar Tasci, football player
- Deniz Taskesen, football player
- Şebnem Taşkan, football player
- Berkan Taz, football player
- Servet Tazegül, taekwondo
- Selim Teber, football player
- Sinan Tekerci, football player
- Ali Tekintamgaç, poker player
- Timur Temeltaş, football player
- Ogün Temizkanoğlu, football player
- Mahmut Temür, football player
- Erkan Teper, boxer
- Uğur Tezel, football player
- Esra Sibel Tezkan, football player
- Ömer Tokaç, football player
- Deran Toksöz, football player
- Ömer Toprak, football player
- Türker Toptaş, football player
- Azad Toptik, football player
- Tunay Torun, football player
- Alaattin Tosun, football player
- Cenk Tosun, football player
- Murat Tosun, football player
- Muzaffer Tosun, boxer
- Ünal Tosun, football player
- Tufan Tosunoğlu, football player
- Pinar Touba, amateur boxer
- Gökhan Töre, football player
- Enes Tubluk, football player
- Ayhan Tumani, football player
- Mehmet Zeki Tunç, football player
- Levent Tuncat, Olympic taekwondo practitioner
- Firat Tuncer, football player
- Emre Turan, football player
- Olcay Turhan, football player
- Ebru Tüfenk, karateka
- Dilara Türk, football player
- Suat Türker, football player
- Haluk Türkeri, football player
- Cem Türkmen, football player
- Burak Uça, football player
- Duygu Ulusoy, Olympic skier
- Deniz Undav, football player
- Dilara Uralp, Olympic sailor
- Oktay Urkal, Olympic boxer
- Meryem Uslu, kickboxer
- Soner Uysal, football manager and former football player
- Tugay Uzan, football player
- Ömer Uzun, football player
- Turgay Uzun, boxer
- Ebru Uzungüney, football player
- Ferhat Ülker, football player
- Hasan Ülker, football player
- Tolga Ünlü, football player
- Volkan Ünlü, football player
- Onur Ünlüçifçi, football player
- Bahtiyar Can Vanlı, football manager
- Deniz Vural, football player
- Cansu Yağ, football player
- Eser Yağmur, football player
- Güven Yalçın, football player
- Robin Yalçın, football player
- Taner Yalçın, football player
- Meryem Yamak, football player
- Volkan Yaman, football player
- Aycan Yanaç, football player
- Viola Yanik, wrestler (Turkish father and German mother)
- Timur Yanyali, football player
- Serhat Yapıcı, football player
- Aylin Yaren, football player
- Cihan Yasarlar, e-athlete
- Mithat Yavaş, football player
- Ferhat Yazgan, football player
- Zafer Yelen, football player
- Müslüm Yelken, football player
- Gülnur Yerlisu, taekwondo practitioner
- Tennur Yerlisu, taekwondo practitioner
- Samed Yeşil, football player
- Youssef Yeşilmen, football player
- Erdoğan Yeşilyurt, football player
- Atilla Yildirim, football player
- Aygün Yıldırım, football player
- Berkan Yıldırım, football player
- Murat Yıldırım (boxer), boxer
- Özkan Yıldırım, football player
- Ramazan Yıldırım, football player
- Cihan Yıldız, football player
- Fuat Yıldız, Olympic wrestler
- Hakkı Yıldız, football player
- Rıfat Yıldız, Olympic wrestler
- Kenan Yıldız, football player
- Deniz Yılmaz, football player
- Fatih Yılmaz, football player
- Mahmut Yılmaz, football player
- Mert Yılmaz, football player
- Murat Yılmaz (footballer, born 1988), football player
- Ozan Yılmaz, football player
- Sefa Yılmaz, football player
- Uğur Yılmaz, football player
- Yasin Yılmaz, football player
- Yusuf Yılmaz, football player
- Sertan Yiğenoğlu, football player
- Berkay Yilmaz, futsal player
- Mehmet Yozgatlı, football player
- Ersin Zehir, football player
- Serhan Zengin, football player
- Furkan Zorba, football player

== See also ==
- Turks in Germany
