= Alma =

Alma or ALMA may refer to:

== Arts and entertainment ==
- Alma (film), a 2009 Spanish short animated film
- Alma, an upcoming film by Sally Potter
- Alma (Oswald de Andrade novel), 1922
- Alma (Le Clézio novel), 2017
- Alma (play), a 1996 drama by Joshua Sobol about Alma Mahler-Werfel
- Alma (Carminho album), 2012
- Alma (Nicki Nicole album), 2023
- "Alma" (song), by Fonseca, 2008
- "Alma", a song by Tom Lehrer from the 1965 album That Was the Year That Was about the life of Alma Mahler
- ALMA Award, or American Latino Media Arts Award

== Businesses ==
- Alma (Toronto restaurant), an Asian fusion restaurant located in Toronto, Ontario
- Alma (Portland restaurant), a Balkan restaurant in Portland, Oregon
- Alma Books, a British publishing house
- Alma Media, a Finnish digital service business
- ALMA de México, a low-cost airline

== Military ==
- Battle of the Alma, an 1854 Crimean War battle
- Alma-class ironclad, French Navy corvettes built in the 1860s
  - French ironclad Alma

== People ==
- Alma (given name), including a list of people, Mormon religious figures and fictional characters with the name
- Alma (Finnish singer) (Alma-Sofia Miettinen, born 1996)
- Alma (French singer) (Alexandra Maquet, born 1988)

== Places ==
=== Australia ===
- Alma, South Australia
- Alma, Victoria
- Alma, Western Australia
- South Broken Hill, New South Wales, formerly known as Alma
  - Electoral district of Alma

=== Canada ===
- Alma Parish, New Brunswick
  - Alma, New Brunswick, a fishing village
- Alma, Nova Scotia
- Alma, Ontario
- Alma, Prince Edward Island
- Alma, Quebec

=== United States ===
- Alma, Alabama
- Alma, Arkansas
- Alma, California
- Alma, Colorado
- Alma, Georgia
- Alma, Illinois
- Alma Township, Marion County, Illinois
- Alma, Kansas
- Alma, Louisiana
- Alma, Michigan
- Alma Township, Marshall County, Minnesota
- Alma, Missouri
- Alma, Nebraska
- Alma Township, Harlan County, Nebraska
- Alma, New Mexico
- Alma, New York
- Alma, Ohio
- Alma, Oklahoma
- Alma, Oregon
- Alma, Texas
- Alma, Virginia
- Alma, Wisconsin, a city
- Alma, Buffalo County, Wisconsin, a town
- Alma, Jackson County, Wisconsin, a town

=== Elsewhere ===
- Alma (Algeria), former name of Boudouaou
- Alma, Greece
- Alma, Iran
- Alma, Israel
- Alma, Kyrgyzstan
- Alma, Lebanon
- Alma, Bukit Mertajam, Penang, Malaysia
- Alma, Safad, Mandatory Palestine, a depopulated Palestinian village
- Alma, Sibiu, Romania
- Alma, Syria
- Alma, Limpopo, South Africa
- Alma (mountain), a mountain in New Zealand
- Alma River (disambiguation)
- 390 Alma, an asteroid

== Schools ==
- UCLouvain Brussels Woluwe, in Brussels, Belgium, known as Alma, a campus of the University of Louvain in Brussels, Belgium
- Alma College (St. Thomas, Ontario), Canada, a ladies liberal arts college, 1877–1994
- Alma College, in Alma, Michigan, U.S., a liberal arts college
- Alma White College, in Zarephath, New Jersey, U.S., a Bible college, 1921–1978
- Jesuit School of Theology of Santa Clara University, in Berkeley, California, U.S., founded as Alma College
- Collège d'Alma, Alma, Quebec, Canada
- Alma High School (disambiguation)

== Transportation ==
- Alma (1891), a scow schooner
- SS Alma, several ships
- Alma (French automobile), manufactured 1926–1929
- Alma metro station in Brussels, Belgium
- Alma Airport, Alma, Quebec, Canada
- Alma (Rivière La Grande Décharge) Water Aerodrome, Alma, Quebec
- Pont de l'Alma ('Alma Bridge'), Paris, France

== Acronyms ==
- Almaty Museum of Arts, Almaty, Kazakhstan
- Armenian Library and Museum of America, Watertown, Massachusetts, United States
- Asian land mammal age, a geologic timescale for prehistoric Asian fauna
- Atacama Large Millimeter Array, a radio telescope in Chile
- The "Aim, Learn, Master, Achieve" ALMA Initiative, a social inclusion scheme of the European Commission
- ALMA – Citizens for Cyprus, a Cypriot political party established by Odysseas Michaelides

== Other uses ==
- Book of Alma, one of the books that make up the Book of Mormon
- Alma Generating Station, a power station in Wisconsin, United States
- Alma (library platform), a catalogue management system used by academic and larger libraries
- Hurricane Alma, the name of several storms
- Alma: The First Battle, a 1978 board wargame that simulates the Crimean War battle
- ALMA Magazine, an American Spanish-language lifestyle magazine
- Almah or alma, a Hebrew word for a young woman of childbearing age
- AlmaLinux, a Linux distribution

== See also ==
- Alma Bay, Queensland, Australia
- Port Alma, Queensland, Australia
- Alma Depot, Alma, Georgia, United States, a historic site
- Alma City, Minnesota, United States, an unincorporated community
- Alma Center, Wisconsin, United States, a village
- Alma School/Main Street station, a station on the Metro light rail line in Mesa, Arizona, U.S.
- Alma–Marceau station, a Paris Metro station
- Almas (disambiguation)
- Almah (disambiguation)
- Alma Park (disambiguation)
- Alma-0, a programming language
- Almaty, formerly Alma-Ata, the largest city in Kazakhstan
