= Almaz (name) =

Almaz is a given name and surname. Notable people with the name include:

== Given name ==
- Almaz Alsenov (born 1981), Kazakh entrepreneur
- Almaz Askarov (footballer) (born 1992), Russian footballer
- Almaz Askarov (wrestler) (born 1973), Kyrgyzstani wrestler
- Almaz Ayana (born 1991), Ethiopian long-distance runner
- Almaz Chokmorov (born 1954), Soviet footballer
- Almaz Fatikhov (born 1990), Russian footballer
- Almaz Garifullin (born 1971), Russian ice hockey player
- Almaz Issin (born 1990), Kazakhstani volleyball player
- Almaz Ivanov (died 1669), Russian statesman
- Almaz Monasypov (1925–2008), Soviet and Russian composer
- Almaz Sharman (born 1960), Kazakh-born American scientist and academic
- Almaz Smanbekov (born 1998), Kyrgyz freestyle wrestler

== Fictional characters ==
- Almaz, protagonist of the 1936 Soviet Azerbaijani film Almaz

== Surname ==
- Ahmet Almaz, Turkish journalist, translator, and non-fiction writer
- Michael Almaz (1921–2012), Israeli and British playwright, actor, and theatre director

== Fictional characters ==
- Almaz, a character in the video game Disgaea 3

== See also ==
- Almazbek
- Almazov
- Almas (disambiguation)
