= Almas =

Almas may refer to:

== Places ==
- Almas, Ardabil, Iran
- Almas, East Azerbaijan, Iran
- Almas, São Tomé and Príncipe
- Almas, Tocantins, Brazil
- Almaš, former village in Bačka, Serbia
- Almaş or Almash, village in Sharansky District, Bashkortostan, Russia
- Almaș (disambiguation), the name of several rivers and populated places in Romania

== People ==
- Almas Akram (born 1988), Pakistani cricketer
- Almas Atayev (born 1981), Kazakhstani judoka
- Almas Bobby, Pakistani transgender activist
- Almas Heshmati, Swedish-Iranian economist
- Almas Hossain, Bangladeshi politician
- Almas Ildyrym (1907–1952), Azerbaijani poet
- Almas Japua (born 1979), Abkhazian politician
- Almas Khan-e Kanoule'ei (1706–1777), Kurdish poet
- Almas Kishkenbayev (born 1985), Kazakh singer
- Almas Maige (born 1954), Tanzanian politician
- Almas Parveen, Pakistani politician
- Almas Shaukat (born 1995), Indian cricketer
- Almas Uteshov (born 1988), Kazakh weightlifter

== Other uses ==
- Almas (folklore), a purported hominid cryptozoological species
- Almas caviar, the most expensive type of caviar
- Almas Hospital, in Kottakkal, Kerala, India
- Almas (missile)
- Almas Temple, in Washington D.C., U.S.
- Almas Tower, in Dubai, United Arab Emirates
- Almas, a fictional currency in the video game Zeliard

== See also ==
- Almasi (disambiguation)
- Almış, the first Muslim ruler of Volga Bulgaria
- Almas ukhaa, a genus and species of dinosaur
- Almaz (disambiguation)
- Yılmaz
