= Yılmaz =

Yılmaz (pronounced [jɯɫˈmaz]) is a Turkish word that translates to “unyielding”, "unbeatable", or "brave", and is a surname and male given name. Its cognates are Almas (disambiguation) and Almaz (disambiguation).

== Given name ==
- Yekta Yılmaz Gül (born 1978), Turkish Greco-Roman wrestler
- Yılmaz Arslan (born 1968), Turkish film director, screenwriter and producer
- Yılmaz Büyükerşen (born 1936), Turkish politician
- Yılmaz Erdoğan (born 1967), Turkish film director, scenarist, poet and actor
- Yılmaz Gruda (1930–2023), Turkish actor
- Yılmaz Güney (1937–1984), Turkish film director, scenarist, novelist and actor
- Yılmaz Karakoyunlu (1936-2024), Turkish writer and politician
- Yilmaz Kerimo (born 1963), Swedish politician
- Yılmaz Orhan (born 1955), Turkish footballer
- Yılmaz Özlem (born 1972), Turkish footballer
- Yılmaz Urul (1942-2025), Turkish footballer
- Yılmaz Vural (born 1953), Turkish football coach

== Surname ==
- Abdullah Yılmaz (football referee) (born 1978), Turkish football referee
- Abdullah Yılmaz (skier) (born 1961), Turkish skier
- Abdullah Yılmaz (skier, born 2004), Turkish skier
- Atıf Yılmaz (1925–2006), Turkish film director, screenwriter and film producer
- Aydın Yılmaz (born 1988), Turkish footballer
- Ayfer Yılmaz (born 1956), Turkish female civil servant, politician and former government minister
- Barış Alper Yılmaz (born 2000), Turkish footballer
- Betül Yılmaz (born 1988), Turkish female handball player
- Betül Nur Yılmaz, Turkish football referee
- Burak Yılmaz (born 1985), Turkish former international footballer
- Cem Yılmaz (born 1973), Turkish stand-up comedian, actor, cartoonist and screenwriter
- Cem Yılmaz (rower) (born 1982), Turkish Olympian rower
- Cevdet Yılmaz (born 1967), Turkish politician
- Deniz Yılmaz (born 1988), Turkish footballer
- Dilek Akagün Yılmaz (born 1963), Turkish politician
- Durmuş Yılmaz (born 1947), Turkish economist
- Duygu Yılmaz (born 1988), Turkish women's footballer
- Fatih Yılmaz (born 1989), Turkish footballer
- Gözde Yılmaz (born 1991), Turkish female volleyball player
- Gülümser Yılmaz (born 1956), Turkish female chess player
- Hakan Yılmaz (born 1982), Turkish weightlifter
- Huseyin Yilmaz (1924-2013), Turkish-American physicist
- İbrahim Yılmaz (born 1994), Turkish footballer
- Kübra Yılmaz (born 1991), Turkish female handball player
- Lev Yilmaz (born 1973), Turkish-American independent film maker, artist, and publisher
- Mahmut Yılmaz (born 1979), Turkish-German footballer
- Mehmet Yılmaz (born 1988), Turkish footballer
- Mehmet Yılmaz (born 1979), Turkish footballer
- Mesut Yılmaz (1947–2020), Turkish politician
- Mustafa Yılmaz (chess player) (born 1992), Turkish Grand Master of chess
- Neşe Zara Yılmaz (born 1976), Turkish folk singer and actress
- Nevriye Yılmaz (born 1980), Turkish female basketball player
- Nurten Yılmaz (born 1957), Turkish-Austrian politician
- Oğuz Yılmaz (1968–2021), Turkish musician
- Okan Yılmaz (born 1978), Turkish footballer
- Özgür Yılmaz (born 1986), Turkish footballer
- Özgür Yılmaz (born 1977), Turkish judoka
- Ramazan Yılmaz (born 2005), Turkish cyclist
- Reyhan Yılmaz (born 2001), Turkish goalball player
- Rıdvan Yılmaz (born 2001), Turkish footballer
- Serra Yılmaz (born 1954), Turkish actress
- Şimal Yılmaz (born 2003), Turkish female sport shooter
- Şükriye Yılmaz (born 2001), Turkish female armwrestler
- Tayfur Emre Yılmaz (born 1989), Turkish footballer
- Tutya Yılmaz (born 1999), Turkish female artistic gymnast
- Yağız Yılmaz (born 1993), Turkish archer
- Yasemin Beyza Yılmaz (born 2001), Turkish female sport shooter
- Yaşar Yılmaz (born 1930), Turkish wrestler
- Yeliz Yılmaz (born 1980), Turkish female handball player
- Yusuf Yılmaz (born 1991), Turkish footballer

== See also ==
- "Yilmaz" (Criminal: Germany), a television episode
