= Almașu (disambiguation) =

Almașu is a commune in Sălaj County.

Almașu may also refer to:

- Almașu Mare, a commune in Alba County
- Almașu Mic (disambiguation), several places
- Almașu Sec, a village in Cârjiți Commune, Hunedoara County

== See also ==
- Almaș (disambiguation)
