= K. V. Rabiya =

Indian activist (1966–2025)

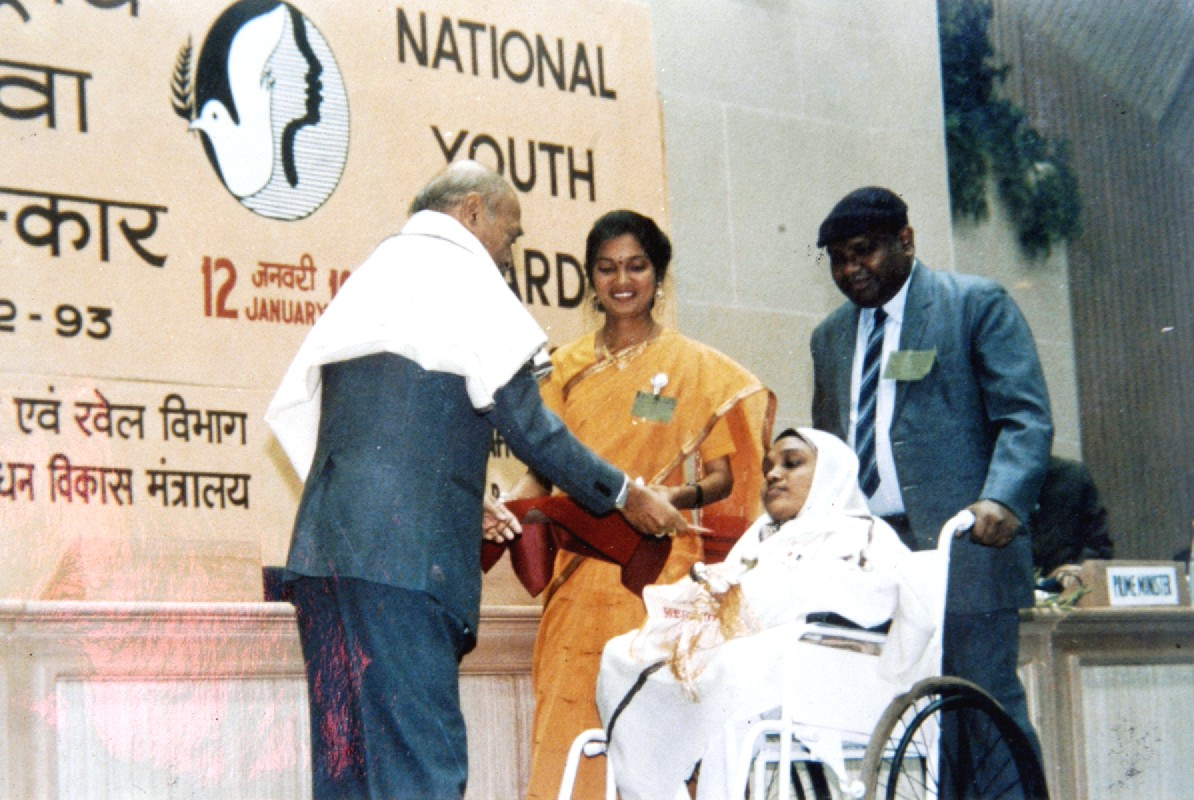
- Rabiya receives the 1993 National Youth Award from the Prime Minister of India Narasimha Rao
- Born: 25 February 1966; Vellilakkadu, Malappuram, Kerala, India
- Died: 4 May 2025 (aged 59)
- Occupation: Social worker
- Known for: Role in the Kerala State Literacy Campaign
- Awards: Padma Shri (2022)-; National Youth Award (1994); Kannagi Sthree Sakthi Puraskar (2001)

Kariveppil Rabiya (25 February 1966 – 4 May 2025) was an Indian physically disabled social worker from Vellilakkadu, Malappuram, Kerala who rose to prominence through her role in the Kerala State Literacy Campaign in Malappuram district in 1990. Her efforts were recognised at a national level by the Government of India on multiple occasions. In 1994, the Ministry of Human Resource Development of the Government of India awarded her the National Youth Award for her contributions to society. In January 2001, she was awarded the first Kannagi Sthree Sakthi Puraskar award for the year 1999 for her contribution to upliftment and empowerment of women. She was awarded India's fourth highest civilian award Padma Shri in January 2022.

== Beginnings ==
Born on 25 February 1966 to a poor Mappila family in a remote village, Vellilakkadu, in the district of Malappuram in Kerala as the daughter of a smalltime ration shopowner, Rabiya did her initial studies at Tirurangadi High School before pursuing her graduation at the PSMO College, Tirurangadi. At the young age of 17, while in her first year at college, her legs were crippled by polio. She was forced to stop her studies since she could only move with the help of a wheelchair.

== Literacy campaign ==
In June 1990, she began a campaign for adult literacy for illiterate people of all ages near her locality. Within six months, virtually the entire illiterate population of Tirurangadi was in her class. Though her work deteriorated her physical condition, she moved forward, garnering support from both the public at large and the authorities. In June 1992, state authorities and officials visited her classroom and were surprised to see a child of 8 studying alongside an 80-year-old woman. Upon receiving her complaints about the lack of basic infrastructure in her village, the District Collector sanctioned roads, electricity, telephone, and water connection for her village. The one-and-a-half-kilometre road was aptly named Akshara (word) Road.

She later started a volunteer organisation, Chalanam (motion), and continued to serve as its president. It runs six schools for physically or intellectually disabled children. The organisation also promotes health awareness and runs schools, health clubs, continuing education programmes, training for women, and rehabilitation of physically disabled people. Its activities also include inspiring public awareness against alcoholism, dowry, family feuds, superstition, and communalism. It also established a small-scale manufacturing unit for women, a women's library, and a youth club in the educationally backward village of Vellilakkadu. Her efforts played an important part in eliminating illiteracy in Kerala.

She also involved herself in the "Akshaya: Bridging the Digital Divide" project that made 'Malappuram the first E-Literate district in India.

== Personal struggles ==
After polio paralysed her below the waist, Rabiya continued to move around in a wheelchair. But a few years later in 2000, she was diagnosed with cancer making things much more difficult for her. She successfully underwent chemotherapy at Amala Hospital, Thrissur. While at the hospital, she counselled other patients and instilled hope in them for their future.

In 2002, she went to Mecca and performed the Hajj, fulfilling her longtime dream.

By 2004, she had returned to her work, but another tragedy struck her. She slipped on the floor of her bathroom breaking her spinal vertebral column and bringing her movements to a virtual halt. She was partially paralysed below the neck. Later, due to the non-functioning of muscles, she had to be resigned to life with a urine bag. As she lay on the waterbed, trying to cope with the pain and inability, she started writing her memories on pages of notebooks using coloured pencils. Despite the odds, she still continued her work alongside 100 other volunteers at Chalanam with continued determination.

The different challenges to her health played havoc with not only the family's psyche but also their finances. To secure finances for her treatment, she wrote her memories painstakingly lying on the bed, word by word, and completed the book – Mouna Nombarangal.

== Death ==
Rabiya died at her sister’s home in Mamburam, Tirurangadi, on 4 May 2025, at the age of 59. She received palliative care at Almas Hospital in Kottakkal for a month before her death.

== Recognition ==
Her autobiography, Swapnangalkku Chirakukalundu (Dreams have wings) was released in April 2009. Sukumar Azhikode hailed it as compared to some of the greatest biographies in history. An earlier collection of her memoirs Mouna Nombarangal (Silent Tears) had been released by the Chief Minister of Kerala V. S. Achuthanandan on 26 October 2006. She has also authored 3 other books. She used the royalties from the book for her medical expenses.

Her achievements despite her physical disabilities made her an icon of the literacy campaign of the 1990s in Kerala. A biographic film entitled "Rabiya Moves", was made by director Ali Akbar and was noted for its motivational content and translated into 14 languages. Various publications across the world have written more than 100 articles on her work.

Her first national recognition came in 1994 when she won the National Youth Award from the Ministry of Human Resource Development of the Government of India. She won the Padma Shri on 25 January 2022, on the eve of the 73rd Republic Day of India. She was the first recipient of Kannagi Devi Stree Shakti Puraskar in 2000 instituted by the Child Welfare Department of the Government of India. She also won the Youth Volunteer against Poverty, jointly instituted by the Government of India Central Youth Affairs Ministry and UNDP in 2000. The Junior Chamber International selected her for the Ten Outstanding Young Indians award in 1999. Other awards include Nehru Yuva Kendra Award, Bajaj Trust Award, Ramasramam Award, the State Literacy Samiti Award, the Seethi Sahib Smaraka award (2010), the Joseph Mundassery Award for Outstanding social work (2010) and the Mary Verghese Award for Excellence in Empowering Ability (2013).

== Books ==
- Mouna Nombarangal (Silent Pains) – Memoir
- Swapnangalkku Chirakukalundu (Dreams have wings) – Autobiography – 2009
