= Kazakh National Medical University =

University in Almaty, Kazakhstan

Coordinates: 43°15′11.3″N 76°55′52.2″E

Kazakh National Medical University named after S.D. Asfendiyarov (KazNMU)
- С.Ж. Асфендияров атындағы Қазақ ұлттық медицина университеті (ҚазҰМУ); S.J. Asfendiiarov atyndağy Qazaq ūlttyq meditsina universitetı (QazŪMU); Казахский национальный медицинский университет имени С. Д. Асфендиярова (КазНМУ)
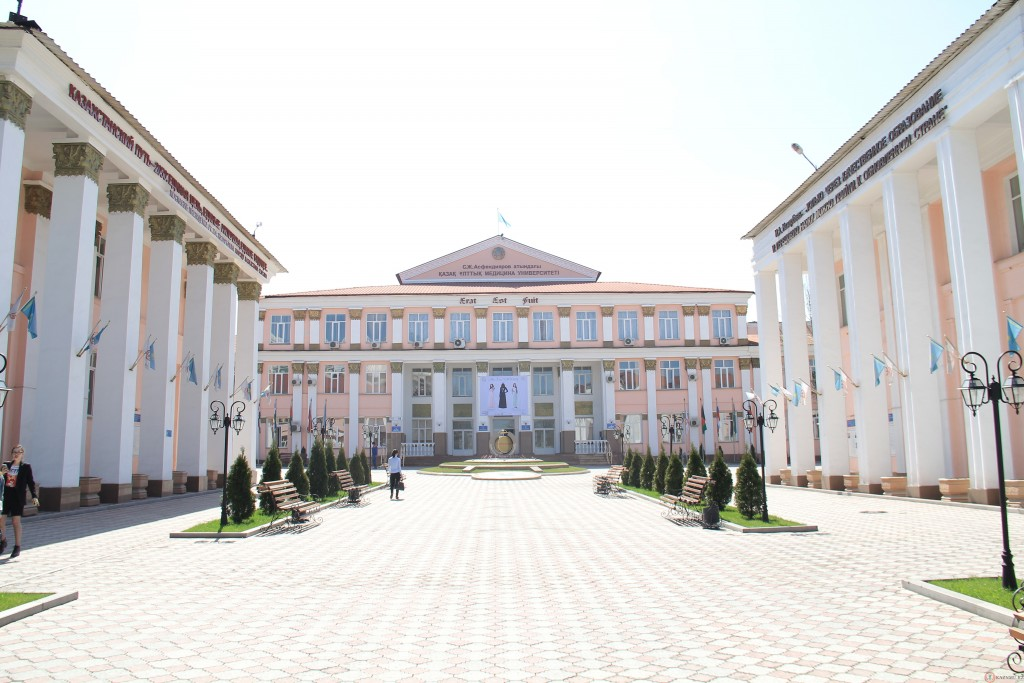
- Main building of Kazakh National Medical University
- Type: National
- Established: 1930
- Rector: Marat Shoranov
- Students: 11,000
- Location: Tole-bi 94, (Kazakhstan) Almaty, Kazakhstan
- Website: www.kaznmu.kz

University rankings

Regional – Overall
- QS Emerging Europe and Central Asia: 146 (2022)

Kazakh National Medical University is a university in Almaty, Kazakhstan. It was established in 1931, and the first rector was S.D. Asfendiyarov. In 2001, the government classified it as a "national" university.

The university has a student population of 11,000 students and PhD students study at KazNMU, and 1500 faculty members.

== Faculties ==
- General medicine faculty
- Therapeutic faculty
- Faculty of pediatrics
- Medico-prophylactic faculty
- Stomatology faculty
- Pharmacy faculty
- Faculty of management in Public Health and Pharmacy
- Postgraduate

== Notable alumni ==
- Almaz Sharman, biomedical and clinical scientist

== Rectors ==
- S. D. Asfendiyarov
- E. H. Kasabulatov
- F. H. Muhambetova
- V. V. Zikeev
- V. I. Zuzin
- S. R. Karynbayev
- S. M. Sidorov
- I. S. Koryakin
- R. I. Samarin
- K. M. Maskeev
- E. S. Belozerov
- T. A. Muminov
- A. A. Akanov
- T.S. Nurgozhin
- M.E. Shoranov
