= Almaz (disambiguation) =

Almaz is a Soviet military space station program.

Almaz may also refer to:

- Almaz-Antey Corporation, a Russian state-owned company in the arms industry
  - NPO Almaz, a Soviet/Russian military R&D enterprise, merged into Almaz-Antey

== Ships ==
- Almaz Shipbuilding Company
- Almaz (ship, 1862), Russian steam clipper
- Russian cruiser Almaz, launched in 1903
- Almaz (01604), a sister ship to the Russian research vessel Yantar

== Other uses ==
- Almaz (name), both given name and surname
- Almaz (Belarus), a police tactical unit of the Belarusian Militsiya
- Almaz, Iran, a village in East Azerbaijan Province
- Almaz, a Russian-made 135 mm camera with a Pentax K-mount
- Almaz (song), by US singer Randy Crawford from her 1986 album Abstract Emotions

== See also ==
- Almas (disambiguation)
- Yılmaz, a Turkish word for "unyielding", etc.
