= Almasi =

Almasi, as a title without diacritical marks, may refer to:

- Almāsī, a village in East Azerbaijan Province, Iran
- Almási, a surname

== See also ==
- Almas (disambiguation)
