= SS Alma =

SS Alma is the name of the following ships:

- SS Alma (1855), wrecked on the Mooshedjerah Reef in the Red Sea on 12 June 1859
- SS Alma (1894), wrecked in 1924

== See also ==
- Alma (disambiguation)
