= Almazov =

Almazov, feminine: Almazova is a Russian patronymic surname associated with the noble Almazov family, whose progenitor had the name Almaz. Notable people with the surname include:

- Aleksei Grishin-Almazov (1880–1919), Russian military commander of White movement in Siberia
- Boris Almazov, Russian poet, translator, writer and literary critic
- Dmitry Almazov, Russian trance DJ, record producer and radio host
- Nadezhda Almazova (born 1952), Russian linguist, professor
- Oleksiy Almazov (Oleksa Almaziv) (1886–1936), officer of the Russian Imperial Army and Ukrainian People's Army
- Pyotr Almazov (1883–1930), archpriest of the Russian Orthodox Church
- Sasha Almazova (born 1986), Russian singer, composer, and poet
