= Glodeni, Mureș =

Glodeni Marossárpatak
- Commune
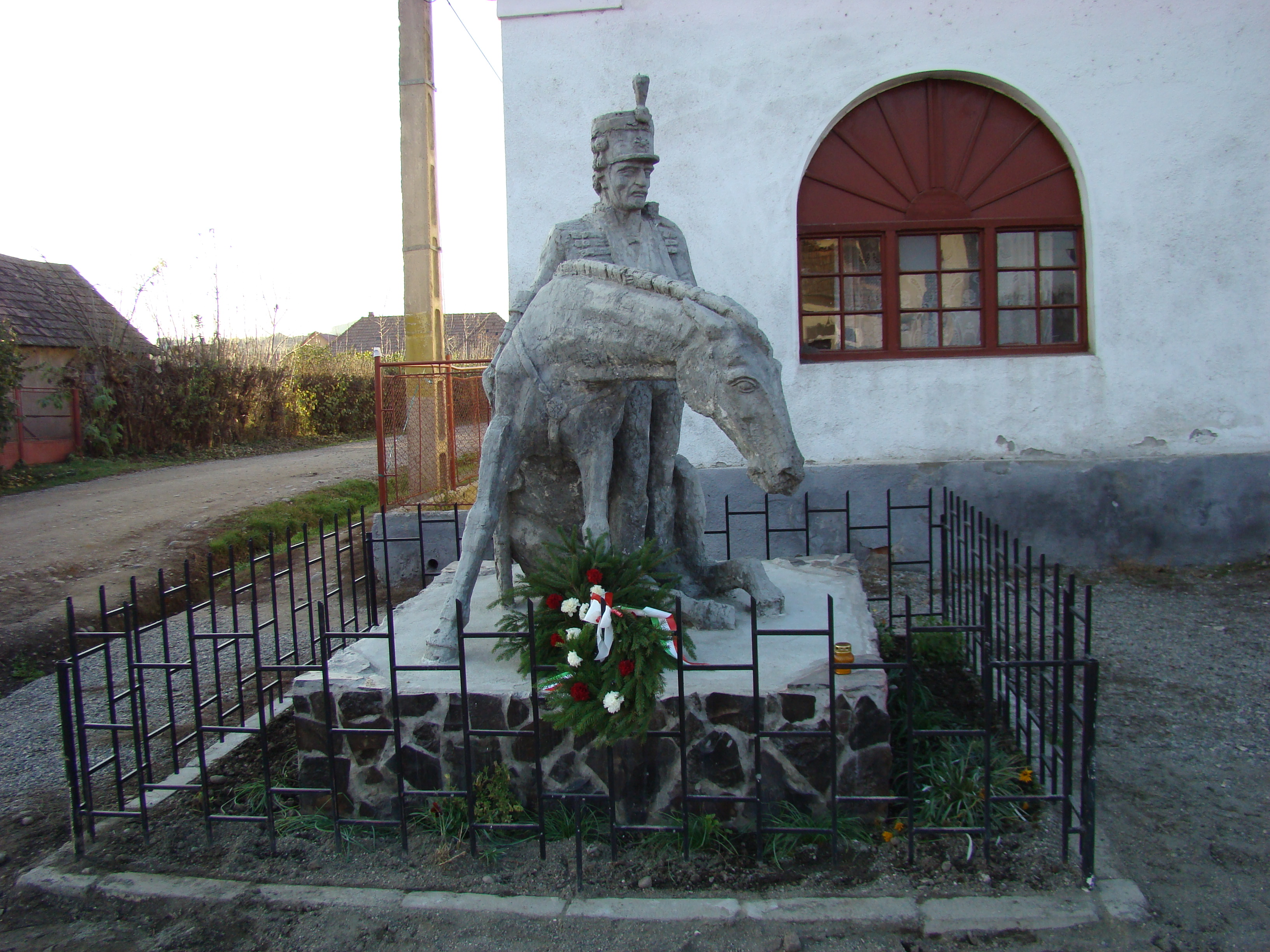
- The injured hussar

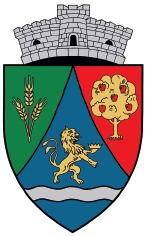
- Coat of arms

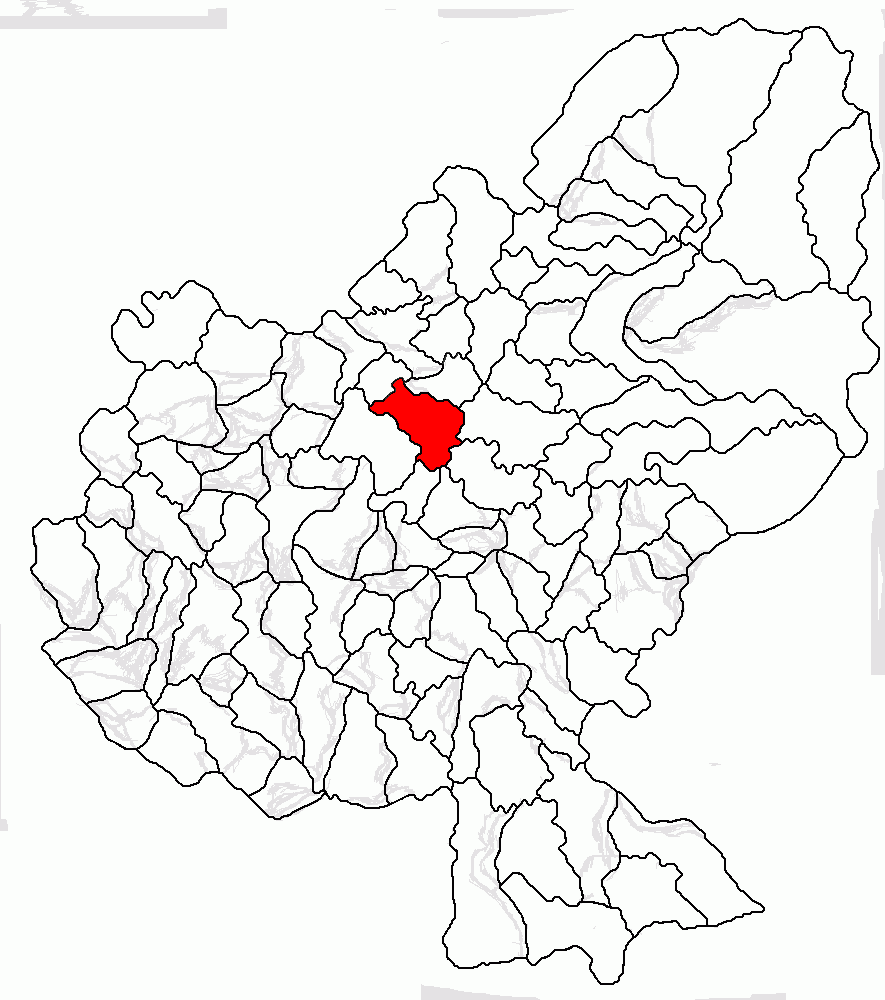
- Location in Mureș County

- Location in Romania
- Coordinates: 46°39′N 24°36′E
- Country: Romania
- County: Mureș

Government
  - Mayor (2020–2024): Barna Kozma (UDMR)
- Area: 54.39 km^{2} (21.00 sq mi)
- Elevation: 367 m (1,204 ft)
- Population (2021-12-01): 3,678
  - Density: 67.62/km^{2} (175.1/sq mi)
- Time zone: UTC+02:00 (EET)
  - Summer (DST): UTC+03:00 (EEST)
- Postal code: 547275
- Area code: (+40) 0265
- Vehicle reg.: MS
- Website: www.primariaglodeni.ro

Glodeni (Hungarian: Marossárpatak, Hungarian pronunciation: [ˈmɒroʃʃaːrpɒtɒk]) is a commune in Mureș County, Transylvania, Romania that is composed of five villages: Glodeni, Merișor (Pusztaalmás), Moișa (Mezőmajos), Păcureni (Pókakeresztúr), and Păingeni (Póka).

== Geography ==
The commune is situated on the Transylvanian Plateau, at an altitude of 367 m (1,204 ft), on the banks of the Mureș River and its right tributary, the river Șar. It is located in the central part of the county, 17 km (11 mi) north of the county seat, Târgu Mureș.

== History ==
It formed part of the Székely Land region of the historical Transylvania province. Until 1918, the village belonged to the Maros-Torda County of the Kingdom of Hungary. In the immediate aftermath of World War I, following the declaration of the Union of Transylvania with Romania, the area passed under Romanian administration during the Hungarian–Romanian War of 1918–1919. By the terms of the Treaty of Trianon of 1920, Glodeni became part of the Kingdom of Romania.

== Demographics ==
Historical population
Year	Pop.	±%
1850	2,819	—
1880	2,828	+0.3%
1900	3,226	+14.1%
1910	3,440	+6.6%
1930	3,790	+10.2%
1956	4,616	+21.8%
1966	4,674	+1.3%
1977	4,511	−3.5%
1992	3,755	−16.8%
2002	3,822	+1.8%
2011	3,817	−0.1%
2021	3,678	−3.6%
Source: Census data

The commune has an absolute Hungarian majority. According to the 2002 census, it had a population of 3,822, of which 75.67% were Hungarians and 21.2% were Romanians. At the 2011 census, there were 3,817 inhabitants: 67.78% Hungarians, 18.26% Romanians, and 11.47% Roma. At the 2021 census, Glodeni had a population of 3,678; of those, 73.14% were Hungarians, 15.25% Romanians, and 6.28% Roma.

== See also ==
- List of Hungarian exonyms (Mureș County)
