= Almaș (disambiguation) =

Almaș is a commune in Arad County.

Almaș may also refer to the following entities in Romania:

- A village in the commune Gârcina, Neamț County
- Almaș (Barcău), a tributary of the Barcău in Bihor County
- Almaș (Cracău), a tributary of the Cracău in Neamț County
- Almaș (Mureș), a tributary of the Mureș in Hunedoara County
- Almaș (Someș), a tributary of the Someș in Sălaj County
- A tributary of the Crișul Alb in Arad County
- A tributary of the Valea Mare in Arad County
- A tributary of the Șar in Mureș County

== See also ==
- Almașu (disambiguation)
- Almaş or Almash, village in Sharansky District, Bashkortostan, Russia
