= Four Battles from the Crimean War =

Board wargame published in 1978

Four Battles from the Crimean War is a "quadrigame" — a set of four thematically linked games that use the same set of rules — published by Simulations Publications Inc. (SPI) in 1978 that simulates four battles during the Crimean War.

== Description ==
Four Battles from the Crimean War contains four relatively simple games, each using only 100 counters, a small 17" x 24" paper hex grid map, and the same set of rules that deal with combat, movement, unit disruptions & rallying, and terrain. Each game simulates a different battle that took place during the Siege of Sevastopol.

- Alma: The First Battle: Simulation of the Battle of Alma (designed by J. Matisee Enzer)
- Balaclava: The Charge of the Light Brigade: Simulation of the Battle of Balaclava (designed by Thomas Gould)
- Inkerman: The Soldier's Battle: Simulation of the Battle of Inkerman (designed by Martin Goldberger)
- Tchernaya River: The Battle of Tractir Bridge: Simulation of the Battle of Tchernaya River (designed by Steven Ross)

In addition to the common rules, each game has a few exclusive rules to cover factors unique to each game such as engineers, fatigue, night, fog, and skirmishes.

=== Scenarios ===
Each of the games has one scenario, except for Inkerman, which has a "what if"" scenario in addition to the historic scenario.

== Publication history ==
In 1975 SPI published their first quadrigame, Blue and Gray. After it proved to be popular, SPI quickly produced more quadrigames, including Four Battles from the Crimean War, which was published in 1978 with graphic design by Redmond A. Simonsen. SPI quadrigames to that point had used a simple set of rules first developed for 1972's Napoleon at War, but SPI decided to develop a new ruleset for Crimean War, adding some complexity. The game initially proved popular, rising to #3 on SPI's Top Ten Bestseller list as soon as it was published and staying on the list for four months. Each of the four games was also sold individually as a "folio" game, packaged in a cardstock folio.

After the demise of SPI, Decision Games acquired the rights to the game in 2000, and republished Alma and Tcharnaya River as pull-out games in Issue 201 of Strategy & Tactics.

== Reception ==
In The Guide to Simulations/Games for Education and Training, Martin Campion was impressed, writing, "The four games in this set are more realistic than other SPI four-game sets, but the games are not significantly more complex." Looking at possible classroom use, Campion thought "these could be made the subject of take-home assignments."

In Issue 16 of the UK wargaming magazine Phoenix, Donald Mack closely analyzed the new game system, and concluded that Crimean War "is a good quadrigame with its own flavour, a rather richer flavour than that of the average quad due to the increased complexity of its rules." Mack also reviewed each of the games individually:

- Alma: "While [it] lacks something as a simulation it is an enjoyable game and does not stray too far from the course of history."
- Balaclava: "A balanced and interesting contest even if history has to be souped up a little."
- Inkerman: Mack thought the designer had added too many optional rules.
- Tchaernaya River: "Our game lasted ten turns before we gave up, bored into near-somnolence."

In Issue 7 of The Wargamer, Jack Greene commented, "The mechanics are definitely more accurate than previous Quads in representing what was happening in the Art of War in the period 1854–1856. These are fun games to play and are not so historically weak as many previous SPI games." Greene concluded, "This is the first quadrigame since the original Blue & Gray that I played all the games of and wanted to play a second time in three cases."

In Issue 29 of Paper Wars, David Vandenbroucke noted that "Crimean War Quad does the best it can with the tools of the late 1970s. Most command problems are simulated by what we are now calling 'idiocy rules', artificial restrictions on when and where units may move." Vandenbroucke concluded, "It stands up as a complete, tested game, with professional components and rules that don’t contradict each other. Thus, while it is something of a period piece, it's still a game worth playing."

== Other reviews and commentary ==
- Fire & Movement #17
- Panzerschreck #12
