= Almazbek =

Almazbek is a Kyrgyzstani given name. Notable people with the name include:

- Almazbek Atambayev (born 1956), Kyrgyzstani politician
- Almazbek Mirzaliev (born 1987), Kyrgyzstani footballer
- Almazbek Raimkulov (born 1977), Kyrgyzstani boxer

== See also ==
- Almaz
- Almazbekov
