= Almas Maige =

Tanzanian politician

Honorable Almas Maige MP

Member of Parliament
- Incumbent
- Assumed office 2015
- Preceded by: Shaffir Sumar
- Constituency: North Tabora Constituency

Personal details
- Born: Athumani Almas Maige; August 21, 1954 (age 72) Tabora Region, Tanganyika Territory
- Party: Party of the Revolution
- Education: Moshi Technical Secondary School; Moshi Technical College
- Alma mater: Dar es Salaam Technical College; Open University of Tanzania (LL.B)

Athumani Almas Maige (born August 21, 1954), is a Tanzanian politician who presently serves as a Chama Cha Mapinduzi's Member of parliament for the North Tabora Constituency since November 2015.

He was the former president of the Alumni Association of the Open University of Tanzania, handing the post to Mussa Sima.
