= Patreon =

American crowdfunding website

Patreon, Inc.
- Wordmark and logo used since 2023

- Screenshot A Patreon page from October 4, 2023
- Website type: Membership platform
- Available in: English
- Headquarters: San Francisco, California, U.S.
- Creators: Jack Conte; Sam Yam
- Key people: Jack Conte (CEO)
- Employees: 400 (2021)
- Website: patreon.com
- Registration: Required
- Users: 3 million monthly active patrons
- Launched: May 2, 2013; 13 years ago
- Current status: Active

Patreon (/ˈpeɪtriɒn/, /-ən/) is an American monetization platform operated by Patreon, Inc.. The Patreon platform allows users to run a subscription service, as well as sell individual digital products. Through Patreon, creators may earn a recurring income by providing rewards and perks to their subscribers, who act as patrons. Patreon charges a commission of 8 to 12 percent of creators' monthly income, in addition to payment processing fees. The company is based in San Francisco, and was founded in 2013. As of April 2026, Patreon reports having over 80 million users, although not all of those are paying members.

== History ==
Patreon, Inc., was co-founded in May 2013 by developer Sam Yam and musician Jack Conte, who was looking for a way to make a living from his YouTube videos. It developed a platform that allowed 'patrons' to pay a set amount of money every time an artist created a work of art. The company raised $2.1 million in August 2013 from a group of venture capitalists and angel investors. In June 2014, Patreon raised a further $15 million in a series A round led by Danny Rimer of Index Ventures. In January 2016, the company closed on a fresh round of $30 million in a series B round, led by Thrive Capital, which put the total raised for Patreon at $47.1 million.

It signed up more than 125,000 "patrons" in its first 18 months. In late 2014, the website announced that patrons were sending over $1,000,000 per month to the site's content creators.

In March 2015, Patreon acquired Subbable, a similar voluntary subscription service created by the Green brothers, and absorbed Subbable creators' pages and content, including CGP Grey, Destin Sandlin's Smarter Every Day, and the Green brothers' own CrashCourse and SciShow channels. The merger was consequent to an expected migration of payment systems with Amazon Payments that Subbable used.

In October 2015, the site was the target of a large cyber-attack, with almost 15 gigabytes of password data, donation records, and source code taken and published. The breach exposed more than 2.3 million unique e-mail addresses and millions of private messages. Following the attack, some patrons received extortion emails demanding Bitcoin payments in exchange for the protection of their personal information.

In January 2017, Patreon announced that it had sent over $100,000,000 to creators since its inception.

In May 2017, Patreon announced that it had over 50,000 active creators and 1 million monthly patrons, and was on track to send over $150 million to creators in 2017. In June 2017, Patreon announced a suite of tools for creators to run membership businesses on the Patreon platform. Notable improvements included a customer relationship management system, a mobile app called Lens, and a service to set up exclusive livestreams.

In August 2018, Patreon announced the acquisition of Memberful, a membership services company.

In April 2020, citing the COVID-19 pandemic as a cause of economic uncertainty, the company laid off 30 employees or 13% of its workforce at the time. In April 2021, the company laid off 36 employees or 13% of its workforce despite reporting recent growth. In October 2021, Patreon confirmed it was looking into implementing cryptocurrencies and NFTs after creators expressed interests in having the opportunity to offer exclusive memberships and benefits to its patrons through a coin or token.

In March 2022, Patreon announced that it had more than 250,000 creators who were using the platform, and there were more than eight million active patrons from more than 200 countries.

In September 2022, Patreon announced it was laying off 80 people, representing about 17% of its staff. As part of the layoffs, the company also announced that it would be closing its Dublin and Berlin offices.

In October 2023, Patreon announced a full redesign of its interface and brand identity, including new features like community chats. Patreon also announced the acquisition of Moment, a ticketed live streaming platform.

In November 2025, Patreon announced that creator profiles and fan profiles would be merged under the creator profile. Patreon gave users the options on how the merge would take place: hiding who they follow, making it public, or giving the option to unfollow creators. This move resulted in significant negative feedback via online communities and forums such as Reddit. With users expressing their displeasure with the forced merge and needing to decide if its worth continuing to support some creators, arguing that there needs to be a separation of personal activity and professional activity on the platform.

== Business model ==
Patreon users are grouped by content type, such as video/films, podcast, comedy, comics, games, and education. These content creators set up a page on the Patreon website, where patrons can choose to pay a fixed amount to a creator on a monthly basis. Alternatively, content creators can configure their page so that patrons pay every time the artist releases a new piece of art. A creator typically displays a goal that the ongoing revenue will go towards, and can set a maximum limit of how much they receive per month. Patrons can cancel their payment at any time. Creators typically provide membership benefits (commonly in the form of exclusive content or behind-the-scenes work) for their patrons, depending on the amount that each patron pays.

Patrons can unlock monetary tiers that increase the content type they see from the user. Many content creators on Patreon are also YouTubers. They can create content on multiple platforms, and while the YouTube videos may be available to the public, the patrons receive private content made exclusively for them in exchange for aiding the Patreon user's goal. Patreon takes an 8-12% commission on pledges. As of May 2017, the average pledge per patron was around $12, and a new patron pledged to a creator every 5.5 seconds.

As of 2022, the four most popular content categories are videos, podcasts, music, and gaming, which collectively make up about half of all Patreon profiles. A quarter of the artists on Patreon produce videos, while podcasts, music, and gaming represent about 7% each.

As of March 2025, Patreon's Community Guidelines allow nudity and suggestive imagery as long as the page is categorized as Adult/18+, with the condition that all works must feature adults who demonstrate consent.

In June 2025, Patreon announced a change to its pricing structure, charging creators 10% of their earnings.

=== Changes in content guidelines and terms of service ===
In December 2017, Patreon announced a service fee starting on December 18, 2017, where some fees would be charged to the patrons rather than all fees being paid by the creator. This caused a backlash from several creators, including some who saw members of their fanbase withdraw small pledges in response. Under the new payment model, a $1 pledge would have cost a patron $1.38, and a $5 pledge would have cost $5.50, representing a 38% and 10% rise respectively. Due to this backlash and the loss of many pledges for creators, Patreon announced that it would not be rolling out these changes, and apologized to its users.

== Bans and restrictions ==
Unlike other online platforms such as YouTube and Facebook, which use trained algorithms to identify potentially inappropriate content, Patreon's trust and safety team monitors users and investigates complaints of Terms of Service violations.

=== Specific users ===
In July 2017, right-wing YouTube personality Lauren Southern was banned from Patreon over concerns about Génération Identitaire's blocking of NGO ships in the Mediterranean, ferrying migrants to Europe off the Libyan coast. A letter she received from Patreon said she was removed for "raising funds in order to take part in activities that are likely to cause loss of life," referring to an incident in May involving Southern, and the larger Defend Europe mission in July, which she covered on YouTube. Philosopher, writer, and podcast host Sam Harris, who also received contributions from patrons on the website, objected to Patreon's approach and announced that he would be leaving the platform because of it. Shortly thereafter Patreon deleted the account of It's Going Down, a far-left news website, for allegedly doxing.

In September 2018, Patreon banned Turkish journalist-in-exile Kamil Maman after Turkey threatened to block the entire site in Turkey if the company did not comply. In an e-mail sent to Maman, Patreon said "This was not an easy decision for [us], as we are huge proponents of free speech, but it was a decision we made in order to best protect access to Turkish creators." Maman condemned Patreon for giving in to the demands of an autocratic regime.

In December 2018, Patreon banned Milo Yiannopoulos a day after he created an account and also banned Carl Benjamin because he used homophobic and racist slurs in a YouTube interview in February 2018. Benjamin said that Patreon had taken his words out of context and that "the video in question should not fall under Patreon's rules because it was on YouTube."

This ban was criticized by Sam Harris and some American libertarians, who have accused it of being politically motivated. Furthermore, Jordan Peterson announced a plan to launch an alternative service that will be safe from political interference, and jointly announced with Dave Rubin in a January 1, 2019, video that they will be leaving Patreon by January 15, 2019, as a direct response to its treatment of Carl Benjamin and has since effected that change.

Patreon banned comedian Owen Benjamin following alleged hate speech. Benjamin filed an arbitration claim for $2.2 million (later upped to $3.5 million) and told fans to file identical claims against Patreon as required by the Terms of Use in an attempt to pressure them into a settlement. Benjamin said that the suit(s) had a basis due to a disrupted economic relationship. Patreon launched a counter-suit against 72 individuals who filed arbitration claims and sought a preliminary injunction to stay all arbitration proceedings pending the outcome of its counter-suit. The injunction was denied, meaning that Patreon may be required to prefund the arbitration claims against itself up to $10,000 per claim. Patreon had previously changed its terms of service on January 1, 2020, to end the conditions under which the suits attempted by Benjamin's supporters (but not himself) occurred, as the lawsuits were filed on January 6. The terms-of-service update stated that only the person banned from the platform would be allowed to file a complaint and that any arbitration fees would have to be paid by the person or entity filing the complaint. The suits open the door to lawsuits from supporters of other Patreon users banned from the platform, with freelance journalist Lauren Southern preparing her suit.

In February 2026, Patreon removed Tyler Oliveira from the platform following a video that was accused of spreading antisemitic tropes.

=== Russian invasion of Ukraine ===
During the 2022 Russian invasion of Ukraine, Patreon maintained its business in Russia despite international pressure on western companies operating in Russia to cease operating there. At the beginning of the Russian invasion of Ukraine, Patreon closed a major Ukrainian account run by a charity named Comeback Alive, which raised money for helping volunteers and veteran divisions due to its financing and training of military personnel. On February 15, 2024, Patreon deleted the account of Artur Rehi, an Estonian military video blogger. Patreon stated "hate speech" as one of the reasons for the deletion, due to Rehi's reference to the Russians in occupied Ukraine as "Occupiers". The other reason was "funding military", despite Rehi's funneling of all donations through Rotary Club.

=== Adult content ===
In March 2014, Patreon announced via email that creators of sexual content on its platform would no longer be allowed to use PayPal services through Patreon to fulfill subscription payments. In July 2016, Patreon emailed its content creators announcing that payments through PayPal would resume for adult-oriented creators. Those who worked within the "Not Safe For Work" categories on Patreon could accept payments through PayPal via PayPal's subsidiary Braintree. In October 2017, Patreon reverted its stance on NSFW content, introducing new restrictions. It published an expanded version of the community guidelines with a broader definition of sexual content, triggering a backlash from some adult content creators. A petition in protest of the changes gathered 1,800 signatures, which drew a response from Jack Conte. In June 2018, Patreon suspended some creators who produced adult content.

=== CSAM ===
Since its inception, Patreon has been widely criticized for its approach on handling and removing child sexual abuse material either drawn, photographed, or filmed. In March 2018, a petition that gathered nearly 37,000 signatures demanded that the company prohibit animators and artists from selling content depicting child rape.

In August 2021, an Australian news agency reported that Patreon was hosting sexual content of children under 18 filmed in a psychiatric hospital in Prague, Czech Republic. In May 2022, social media influencer Michael McWhorter said he found sexually provocative pictures and videos of pre-pubescent children on Patreon categorized as NSFW and requiring the customer to be 18 years or older to view or purchase such content. In September 2022, following the laying off of several members of the Patreon security team, McWhorter published a follow-up video featuring a testimony from another user that she had reported CSAM she found to Patreon staff and it simply dismissed any concerns. Patreon rejected the statements, dismissing them as "dangerous and conspiratorial disinformation".

In March 2023, Patreon announced its partnership with Tech Coalition, an internet agency with aims to combat child sexual exploitation and online child abuse. A few months later in June 2023, an investigation by the BBC discovered AI-generated sexual abuse images of children for sale on the website. Patreon eventually removed the accounts in question.

=== Other ===
In 2018, Patreon was accused of cracking down on ASMR videos. On October 24, 2020, Patreon announced that it would ban all accounts "that advance disinformation promoting the QAnon conspiracy theory".

== See also ==
- Convoz – American rapper (born 1979)
- Liberapay – Nonprofit crowd-funding platform for recurrent unconditional donations
- OnlyFans – British internet content subscription service
