= Tchernaya River: The Battle of Tractir Bridge =

Board wargame published in 1978

Tchernaya River
- Designers: Steven Ross
- Illustrators: Redmond A. Simonsen
- Publishers: Simulations Publications Inc.
- Publication: 1978
- Genres: Crimean War

Tchernaya River: The Battle of Tractir Bridge, subtitled "15 August 1855", is a board wargame published by Simulations Publications Inc. (SPI) in 1978 that was one of the games in the Four Battles from the Crimean War "quadrigame" — a set of four thematically linked games that use the same set of rules. The game simulates the Battle of Chernaya during the Crimean War.

== Background ==
During the Siege of Sevastopol, the Anglo-French expeditionary forces were tightening their grip around the city. The Russians under the command of Prince Mikhail Gorchakov attempted to break the siege by attacking the French, Piedmontese and Ottoman forces near the Traktir Bridge on the Chernaya River.

== Description ==
Tchaernaya River is a relatively simple games, using only 100 counters, a small 17" x 24" paper hex grid map scaled at 180 metres (200 yd) per hex, and a set of rules that deal with combat, movement, unit disruptions & rallying, and terrain. There are special rules for the aqueduct flowing through the middle of the map, Russian engineers that can build bridges, and advantages enjoyed by forces within redoubts.

=== Gameplay ===
The game uses a simple "I Go, You Go" alternating series of turns, where the following phases are followed, first by the Allied player, and then by the Russians:

- Movement: The active player moves units.
- Defensive Ranged Fire: The non-active player conducts defensive ranged fire.
- Offensive Ranged Fire: The active player fires ranged weapons.
- Melee: Any units belonging to the active player that are adjacent to enemy units may engage in melee (hand-to-hand) combat.
- Rally: The active player attempts to rally units that have been disrupted by enemy fire.

When both players have completed a turn, one game turn is finished. The game lasts for fifteen turns.

=== Victory conditions ===
Both players earn Victory Points (VPs) for eliminating enemy units and possession of key geographical objectives.

At the end of the game, the Allied VPs are subtracted from the Russian VPs. If the result is 15 or more, then the Russian player wins. If the result is less than 15, the Allied player is the winner.

=== Variant scenario ===
The game offers a non historical scenario where the Russian use their reserve units at the start of the day rather than midway through the battle.

== Publication history ==
In 1975 SPI published their first quadrigame, Blue and Gray. After it proved to be popular, SPI quickly produced more quadrigames. One of these was 1978's Four Battles from the Crimean War, which included Balaclava, a game designed by Thomas Gould, with graphic design by Redmond A. Simonsen. SPI quadrigames to that point had used a simple set of rules first developed for 1972's Napoleon at War, but SPI decided to develop a new ruleset for Crimean War, adding some complexity. The quadrigame initially proved popular, rising to #3 on SPI's Top Ten Bestseller list as soon as it was published and staying on the list for four months. Tchernaya River, along with the other three games in the Crimean War box, was also sold individually as a "folio" game, packaged in a cardstock folio.

In 2000, Decision Games republished Tchernaya River in Issue 201 of Strategy & Tactics.

== Reception ==
In Issue 16 of the UK wargaming magazine Phoenix, Donald Mack found the game unexciting, commenting, "Our game lasted ten turns before we gave up, bored into near-somnolence."

In Issue 7 of The Wargamer, Jack Greene called this "a fun game to play and is not so historically weak as many previous SPI games." Greene concluded, "I wanted to play a second time."

In Issue 29 of Paper Wars, David Vandenbroucke noted that "Most command problems are simulated by what we are now calling 'idiocy rules', artificial restrictions on when and where units may move." Vandenbroucke concluded, "It stands up as a complete, tested game, with professional components and rules that don't contradict each other. Thus, while it is something of a period piece, it's still a game worth playing."

== Other reviews and commentary ==
- Fire & Movement #17
- Panzerschreck #12
