= Alma Park =

Alma Park may refer to:

- Alma Park, New South Wales, in Australia
- Alma Park, St Kilda East, Victoria, Australia
- Alma Park Zoo, in Queensland, Australia
- Alma Park Estate, earlier RAF Belton Park, in Lincolnshire, England
- Alma Park, a park in Los Angeles, U.S.

== See also ==
- Alma (disambiguation)
