= Alma River =

Alma River may refer to:

- Alma River (Manouane River), a tributary of Lac Saint-Jean in Quebec, in Canada
- Alma (Crimea)
- Alma (Tuscany)
- Alma River (New Zealand)
- Alma River (Australia), a 32 km tributary of Lyons River

== See also ==
- Almaș River (disambiguation)
