= Dacian fortress of Cozia =

- Location within Romania
- 45.883°N 22.843°E
- Location: Vârful Piatra Coziei, Cozia, Hunedoara, Romania

Site notes
- Elevation: 650 m (2,130 ft)
- Condition: Ruined

Monument istoric
- Reference no.: HD-I-s-B-03183

The Dacian fortress of Cozia was a Dacian fortified town.
