= Bugün =

Turkish newspaper

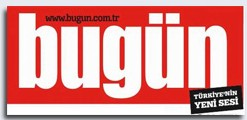
- Type: Daily newspaper
- Format: Berliner
- Owner: Koza İpek Holding
- Editor: Erhan Başyurt
- Founded: 6 September 2005
- Ceased publication: 29 February 2016
- Political alignment: Gülenism
- Language: Turkish
- City: Istanbul
- Country: Turkey
- Circulation: 110,000 (2013)
- Website: www.bugun.com.tr

Bugün (English: Today) was a Turkish daily newspaper. It was established in 2005. Columnists and journalists working for it have included Cengiz Çandar, Ahmet Almaz, Toktamış Ateş and Kamil Maman.

Bugün was founded in January 2003 as Dünden Bugüne Tercüman, an attempt to resurrect Tercüman, a former Turkish daily founded in the 1950s . It was renamed as Bugün in 2005. The paper belonged to Koza İpek Holding, a conglomerate considered to belong to the network of followers of the U.S.-based preacher Fethullah Gülen. During the 2010s, Bugün was aligned with the conservative positions of the governing Justice and Development Party (AKP), but after a rift in 2013, it started criticizing the AKP, and in 2015, it was perceived to suffer pressure as part of the media opposed to the government.
