= Balaclava: The Charge of the Light Brigade =

Board wargame published in 1978

Balaclava
- Designers: Thomas Gould
- Illustrators: Redmond A. Simonsen
- Publishers: Simulations Publications Inc.
- Publication: 1978
- Genres: Crimean War

Balaclava: The Charge of the Light Brigade, subtitled "25 October 1854", is a board wargame published by Simulations Publications Inc. (SPI) in 1978 that was one of the games in the Four Battles from the Crimean War "quadrigame" — a set of four thematically linked games that use the same set of rules. The game simulates the Battle of Balaclava during the Crimean War.

== Background ==
During the Siege of Sevastopol, the British forces under Lord Raglan occupied the port of Balaclava, but left their right flank exposed. The Russian army under Russian General Menshikov attacked, hoping to disrupt the Anglo-French siege. During the battle, a misinterpreted order from Raglan resulted in the Charge of the Light Brigade.

== Description ==
Balaclava is a relatively simple games, using only 100 counters, a small 17" x 24" paper hex grid map, and a set of rules that deal with combat, movement, unit disruptions & rallying, and terrain. There are special rules for fatigue, as well as the effect of a short stretch of aqueduct on attackers emerging from it.

=== Gameplay ===
The game uses a simple "I Go, You Go" alternating series of turns, where the following phases are followed, first by the Allies, and then by the Russians:

- Movement: The active player moves units.
- Defensive Ranged Fire: The non-active player conducts defensive ranged fire.
- Offensive Ranged Fire: The active player fires ranged weapons.
- Melee: Any units belonging to the active player that are adjacent to enemy units may engage in melee (hand-to-hand) combat.
- Rally: The active player attempts to rally units that have been disrupted by enemy fire.

When both players have completed a turn, one game turn is finished. The game lasts for twelve turns.

=== Victory conditions ===
Both players earn Victory Points (VPs) for eliminating enemy units. Also, the Allied player earns VPs for occupying Russian redoubts, and the Russian player earns VPs for retaining possession of those redoubts.

At the end of the game, the player with the most VPs is the winner.

== Publication history ==
In 1975 SPI published their first quadrigame, Blue and Gray. After it proved to be popular, SPI quickly produced more quadrigames. One of these was 1978's Four Battles from the Crimean War, which included Balaclava, a game designed by Thomas Gould, with graphic design by Redmond A. Simonsen. SPI quadrigames to that point had used a simple set of rules first developed for 1972's Napoleon at War, but SPI decided to develop a new ruleset for Crimean War, adding some complexity. The quadrigame initially proved popular, rising to #3 on SPI's Top Ten Bestseller list as soon as it was published and staying on the list for four months. Balaclava, along with the other three games in the Crimean War box, was also sold individually as a "folio" game, packaged in a cardstock folio.

== Reception ==
In Issue 16 of the UK wargaming magazine Phoenix, Donald Mack commented "A balanced and interesting contest even if history has to be souped up a little."

In Issue 7 of The Wargamer, Jack Greene called this "a fun game to play and is not so historically weak as many previous SPI games." Greene concluded, "I wanted to play a second time."

In Issue 29 of Paper Wars, David Vandenbroucke noted that "Most command problems are simulated by what we are now calling 'idiocy rules', artificial restrictions on when and where units may move." Vandenbroucke concluded, "It stands up as a complete, tested game, with professional components and rules that don’t contradict each other. Thus, while it is something of a period piece, it's still a game worth playing."

== Other reviews and commentary ==
- Fire & Movement #17
- Panzerschreck #12
