= Kamil Maman =

Journalist

- Occupation: Journalist

Kamil Maman is a Turkish journalist working in exile from Canada, originally a writer for the daily newspaper Bugün until it was seized by the Turkish government in 2015. In connection with the seizure, Maman was arrested and subject to torture by Turkish police. In 2018, his Patreon account was terminated after the Turkish government had threatened the San Francisco-based company to block the entire site in the country.

Turkish media often refers to him as being sympathetic to the Gülen movement, a "fugitive", and a "terrorist".
