= Almah (disambiguation) =

Almah (Hebrew: עַלְמָה) is a Hebrew word for a young woman of childbearing age.

Almah or Almeh may also refer to:

- Almah (band), a Brazilian metal band
  - Almah (album), 2006
- Almah (dancer) (Arabic: عالمة), or Almeh, a class of courtesans in Egypt
- Almah Jane Frisby (1857—1931), an American physician and university professor
- Alma, Israel (Hebrew: עַלְמָה)
- Almeh Rural District (Persian: دهستان آلمه), in North Khorasan Province, Iran
- Ibrahim Alma (Arabic: ابراهيم عالمة) (born 1991), a Syrian footballer

== See also ==
- Alma (disambiguation)
