= Alma High School =

Alma High School may refer to:

- Alma High School (Arkansas), in Alma, Arkansas, U.S.
- Alma High School (Michigan), in Alma, Michigan, U.S.
- Alma High School (Nebraska), in Alma, Nebraska, U.S.

== See also ==
- Alma (disambiguation)#Education
- Alma Bryant High School, in Bayou La Batre, Alabama, U.S.
- Pacific Bay Christian School, formerly Alma Heights Christian Academy, in Pacifica, California, U.S.
