= Inkerman: The Soldier's Battle =

Board wargame published in 1978

Inkerman
- Designers: Martin Goldberger
- Illustrators: Redmond A. Simonsen
- Publishers: Simulations Publications Inc.
- Publication: 1978
- Genres: Crimean War

Inkerman: The Soldier's Battle, subtitled "5 November 1854", is a board wargame published by Simulations Publications Inc. (SPI) in 1978 that was one of the games in the Four Battles from the Crimean War "quadrigame" — a set of four thematically linked games that use the same set of rules. The game simulates the Battle of Inkerman during the Crimean War.

== Background ==
In setting up the Siege of Sevastopol, the Anglo-French expeditionary forces did not have enough troops to fully man the lines surrounding the city. The Russian commander, Alexander Menshikov, realized this, and moved to attack the British lines at a weak point near Inkerman Ridge. Fog enveloped the entire area on the morning of 5 November 1854, precluding effective control by senior commanders, leading to local fighting amongst units smaller than a company in size. This earned the battle the sobriquet "The Soldier's Battle".

== Description ==
Inkerman is a relatively simple games, using only 100 counters, a small 17" x 24" paper hex grid map scaled at 180 metres (200 yd) per hex, and a set of rules that deal with combat, movement, unit disruptions & rallying, and terrain. There are special rules for fog, night combat, stacking of counters, pickets, and skirmishers.

=== Gameplay ===
The game uses a simple "I Go, You Go" alternating series of turns, where the following phases are followed, first by the British, and then by the Russians:

- Movement: The active player moves units.
- Defensive Ranged Fire: The non-active player conducts defensive ranged fire.
- Offensive Ranged Fire: The active player fires ranged weapons.
- Melee: Any units belonging to the active player that are adjacent to enemy units may engage in melee (hand-to-hand) combat.
- Rally: The active player attempts to rally units that have been disrupted by enemy fire.

When both players have completed a turn, one game turn is finished. The game lasts for twelve turns.

=== Victory conditions ===
Both players earn Victory Points (VPs) for eliminating enemy units and possession of key geographical objectives. At the end of the game, the player with the most VPs is the winner.

== Publication history ==
In 1975 SPI published their first quadrigame, Blue and Gray. After it proved to be popular, SPI quickly produced more quadrigames. One of these was 1978's Four Battles from the Crimean War, which included Balaclava, a game designed by Thomas Gould, with graphic design by Redmond A. Simonsen. SPI quadrigames to that point had used a simple set of rules first developed for 1972's Napoleon at War, but SPI decided to develop a new ruleset for Crimean War, adding some complexity. The quadrigame initially proved popular, rising to #3 on SPI's Top Ten Bestseller list as soon as it was published and staying on the list for four months. Inkerman, along with the other three games in the Crimean War box, was also sold individually as a "folio" game, packaged in a cardstock folio.

== Reception ==
In Issue 16 of the UK wargaming magazine Phoenix, Donald Mack commented "A balanced and interesting contest even if history has to be souped up a little."

In Issue 7 of The Wargamer, Jack Greene called this "a fun game to play and is not so historically weak as many previous SPI games." Greene concluded, "I wanted to play a second time."

In Issue 29 of Paper Wars, David Vandenbroucke noted that "Most command problems are simulated by what we are now calling 'idiocy rules', artificial restrictions on when and where units may move." Vandenbroucke concluded, "It stands up as a complete, tested game, with professional components and rules that don’t contradict each other. Thus, while it is something of a period piece, it's still a game worth playing."

== Other reviews and commentary ==
- Fire & Movement #17
- Panzerschreck #12
