= Alma-ye Sofla =

Alma-ye Sofla الماسفلي
- Village
- Location within Iran
- Coordinates: 32°13′21″N 49°38′49″E
- Country: Iran
- Province: Khuzestan
- County: Andika
- Bakhsh: Central
- Rural District: Shalal and Dasht-e Gol

Population (2006)
  - Total: 40
- Time zone: UTC+3:30 (IRST)
  - Summer (DST): UTC+4:30 (IRDT)

Alma-ye Sofla (Persian: الماسفلي, also Romanized as Almā-ye Soflá; also known as Almā) is a village in Shalal and Dasht-e Gol Rural District, in the Central District of Andika County, Khuzestan Province, Iran. At the 2006 census, its population was 40, in 8 families.
