= Almaz Garifullin =

Russian ice hockey player

- Born: January 4, 1971 (age 54); Kazan, Russian SFSR, Soviet Union
- Height: 6 ft 2 in (188 cm)
- Weight: 203 lb (92 kg; 14 st 7 lb)
- Position: Centre
- Shot: Right
- Played for: SK Uritskogo Kazan; Itil Kazan; Ak Bars Kazan; Metallurg Magnitogorsk; Neftekhimik Nizhnekamsk; Sibir Novosibirsk
- Playing career: 1987–2006

Almaz Garifullin (born January 4, 1971) is a Soviet and Russian former professional ice hockey forward. He is a one-time Russian Champion. After completing his career as a player, he became a coach.

== Career statistics ==
			Regular season					Playoffs
Season	Team	League	GP	G	A	Pts	PIM	GP	G	A	Pts	PIM
1987–88	SK Uritskogo Kazan	Soviet2	2	0	0	0	0	—	—	—	—	—
1988–89	SK Uritskogo Kazan	Soviet2	13	0	0	0	2	—	—	—	—	—
1989–90	SK Uritskogo Kazan	Soviet	18	1	0	1	2	—	—	—	—	—
1990–91	Itil Kazan	Soviet	24	4	1	5	4	—	—	—	—	—
1991–92	Itil Kazan	Soviet	21	3	2	5	4	—	—	—	—	—
1992–93	Itil Kazan	Russia	38	6	7	13	10	—	—	—	—	—
1992–93	TAN Kazan	Russia2	6	0	3	3	4	—	—	—	—	—
1993–94	Itil Kazan	Russia	41	2	2	4	20	4	0	0	0	0
1993–94	Ak Bars Kazan-2	Russia3	1	0	1	1	2	—	—	—	—	—
1994–95	Itil Kazan	Russia	51	6	2	8	10	2	0	0	0	0
1994–95	Itil Kazan-2	Russia2	2	0	0	0	0	—	—	—	—	—
1995–96	Ak Bars Kazan	Russia	50	6	9	15	10	5	2	0	2	6
1996–97	Ak Bars Kazan	Russia	44	9	8	17	10	3	1	0	1	0
1997–98	Ak Bars Kazan	Russia	46	7	19	26	14	7	0	0	0	0
1998–99	Ak Bars Kazan	Russia	36	4	8	12	6	12	2	3	5	4
1998–99	Ak Bars Kazan-2	Russia3	2	0	1	1	0	—	—	—	—	—
1999–00	Ak Bars Kazan	Russia	38	6	9	15	28	18	2	2	4	10
2000–01	Ak Bars Kazan	Russia	41	7	6	13	20	4	0	1	1	2
2000–01	Ak Bars Kazan-2	Russia3	1	0	0	0	0	—	—	—	—	—
2001–02	Ak Bars Kazan	Russia	20	2	1	3	2	3	0	0	0	0
2001–02	Ak Bars Kazan-2	Russia3	15	11	17	28	14	—	—	—	—	—
2002–03	Metallurg Magnitogorsk	Russia	5	0	1	1	2	—	—	—	—	—
2002–03	Metallurg Magnitogorsk-2	Russia3	2	3	0	3	0	—	—	—	—	—
2002–03	HC Neftekhimik Nizhnekamsk	Russia	27	2	1	3	4	—	—	—	—	—
2003–04	HC Sibir Novosibirsk	Russia	57	4	6	10	38	—	—	—	—	—
2004–05	HC Sibir Novosibirsk	Russia	22	1	0	1	2	—	—	—	—	—
2004–05	Mechel Chelyabinsk	Russia2	22	6	6	12	18	8	1	1	2	0
2005–06	HK Dmitrov	Russia2	15	1	3	4	16	—	—	—	—	—
2005–06	HK Dmitrov-2	Russia3	3	1	1	2	0	—	—	—	—	—
2005–06	Neftyanik Leninogorsk	Russia2	12	1	6	7	6	—	—	—	—	—
2005–06	Ak Bars Kazan-2	Russia3	2	0	2	2	0	—	—	—	—	—
Russia totals			516	62	79	141	176	58	7	6	13	22

== Awards and honors ==
Award	Year
RSL
Winner (Ak Bars Kazan)	1998
