= Almaz Alsenov =

Kazakh entrepreneur

- Алмаз Альсенов
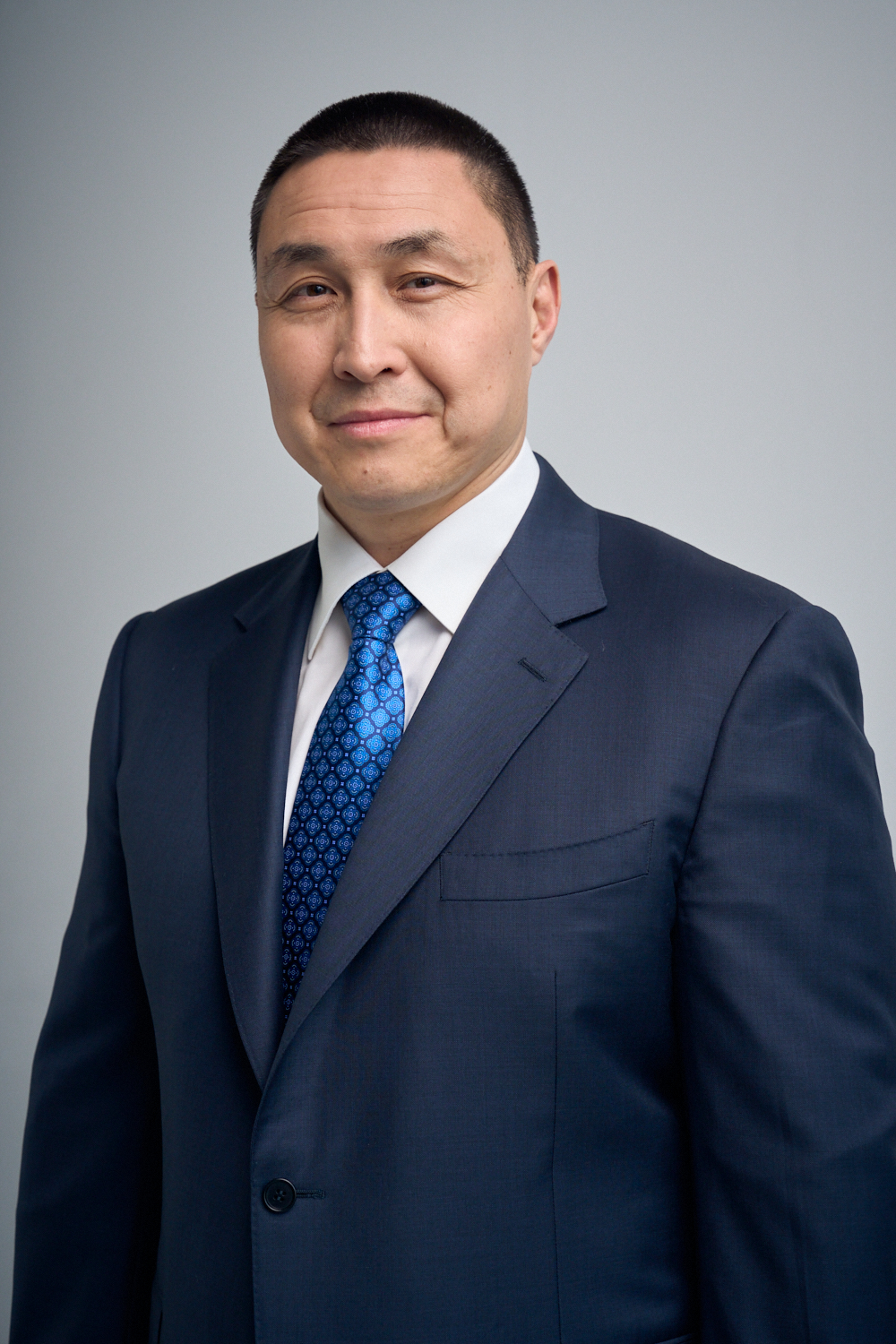
- Born: August 14, 1981 (age 45)
- Education: Eurasian Humanities Institute; Karaganda State Technical University; Almaty Management University
- Occupations: entrepreneur, philanthropist, Judoka, founder

Almaz Alsenov (born 14 August 1981) is a Kazakhstan-born entrepreneur, philanthropist, and former professional Judoka. He is the founder of Harvest Group, adviser to the President of the International Judo Federation, and also the president of JENYS club (Kazakhstan).

== Biography ==
=== Education ===
Almaz Alsenov finished School No.88 in Karaganda, Kazakhstan, and graduated in 2002 from the Eurasian Humanities Institute with a BA degree in Management and Economics.

In 2006, he was awarded a diploma in Geophysical Engineering (mining) from the Karaganda State Technical University, and in 2007, he earned his MBA in Corporate Management from Almaty Management University.

=== Judo ===
Almaz Alsenov is a Kazakhstan, a 5th Dan Black Belt, has won multiple national judo championships, and from 1997 to 2004, he was part of the Kazakhstan National Judo Team.

In 2000, he won a bronze medal at the Asian Junior Championships in Hong Kong, and a gold medal at the under 21 International Masters in Bremen, Germany.

From 2011 to 2015, Almaz Alsenov held the position of both marketing director and member of the executive committee of the Judo Union of Asia. From 2015 to 2022, he also served as a Member of the advisory board of the European Judo Union.

In 2022, Almaz Alsenov was appointed chairman of the Board of Trustees of the professional judo club JENYS in Kazakhstan.

Since 2023, he has been Adviser to the President of the International Judo Federation.

During Almaz Alsenov's tenure at the Asian Judo Union, judo in Kazakhstan experienced rapid development, producing both world champions and Olympic medalists.

In 2024, President Kassym-Jomart Tokayev personally awarded Almaz with the Order of Kurmet, for his contributions to judo. The honor was bestowed during a ceremony celebrating Olympic athletes for their achievements at the 2024 Paris Olympics.

=== Business ===
In 2015, Almaz Alsenov founded Harvest Group, an international trader and distributor of agricultural products.

In 2023, Almaz Alsenov and Anel Alsenova were awarded EY Entrepreneur Of The Year in the "Services & Commerce" category as founders of Harvest Group.

Harvest Group also qualified as a finalist for EY Entrepreneur Of The Year 2023, and is ranked 53rd in the Forbes list of the richest businessmen in Kazakhstan.

== Personal life ==
Almaz Alsenov lives in Morges, Switzerland, and is married.

His mother, Gulshara Mukusheva (born 22 May 1955), is a professor with a Doctor of Technical Sciences degree. She is the director of the Technical Lyceum and the chairman of the Trade Union Committee of Karaganda Technical University.

His father, Jenys Kamenovich Alsenov (born 6 February 1945), holds a Candidate of Technical Sciences degree and is an associate professor. He worked in the Department of Mining Machinery and Equipment at Karaganda Technical University. In honor of his father, the first professional judo club in Kazakhstan, "Jenys,” was established, and an international tournament, the "Jenys Cup,” is organized by the club.

His grandfather, Mayzhan Mukushevich Mukushev, was a Doctor of Technical Sciences (1974), a professor (1976), and a laureate of the USSR State Prize (1972).
