= Almaz Chokmorov =

Soviet footballer

Personal information
- Full name: Almaz Namirbekovich Chokmorov
- Date of birth: 18 January 1954 (age 72)
- Place of birth: Kyrgyzstan SSR
- Position: Forward

Senior career*
Years	Team	Apps	(Gls)
1972–1973	Alga Frunze	59	(10)
1974	Pakhtakor Tashkent	2	(0)
1974–1984	Alga Frunze		(105)
- * Club domestic league appearances and goals

Almaz Chokmorov (Russian: Алмаз Намырбекович Чокморов; born 18 January 1954) is an association football forward who played for Soviet club Alga Frunze throughout the 1970s and 1980s.

== Career ==
Born in the Kyrgyzstan SSR, Chokmorov began playing professional football with Soviet First League side FC Alga Frunze where his older brother Mars, was a star player. Almaz spent four seasons in the Soviet First League with Alga, and had a brief spell in the Soviet Top League with Pakhtakor Tashkent. Chokmorov also played for the Soviet Union's national youth team.

Chokmorov scored more than 100 Soviet league goals for Alga, and the Football Federation of the Kyrgyz Republic named the award for players with at least 100 goals in Kyrgyzstan League after him.
