= Yusuf Yılmaz =

German-Turkish footballer

Personal information
- Full name: Yusuf Yılmaz
- Date of birth: January 30, 1991 (age 35)
- Place of birth: Hanover, Germany
- Height: 1.78 m (5 ft 10 in)
- Positions: Midfielder; attacking midfielder

Youth career
- VfB Wülfel
- –2006: Hannover 96
- 2007–2009: Stoke City

Senior career*
Years	Team	Apps	(Gls)
2009–2010	Ethnikos Piraeus	3	(0)
2011–2013	FSV Frankfurt II	15	(1)
- * Club domestic league appearances and goals as of 24 February 2013

Yusuf Yılmaz (born 30 January 1991) is a German footballer with Turkish descent who last played professionally in Germany for FSV Frankfurt II. He has previously played in Greece for Ethnikos Piraeus in 2009-2010. He has previously played for English club Stoke City in their youth Academy as well as his hometown club Hannover 96.

== Personal life ==
Yusuf is the younger brother of Fatih Yılmaz and both hold a German passport.
