= Alma (library platform) =

Library management system

- Developer: Ex Libris Group
- Release: 2012
- Type: Library services platform
- License: Proprietary
- Website: exlibrisgroup.com/products/alma-library-services-platform/

Alma is a cloud-based library services platform developed by the Ex Libris Group. It is used by academic and research libraries to manage library resources and services.

== Technical features ==
Alma combines the functions of traditional integrated library systems (ILS) with those of electronic resource management (ERM) systems. Through its modular structure, it supports a wide range of library workflows, including acquisitions, cataloguing, circulation of physical and digital materials, digital rights management, link resolving via SFX, interlibrary loan, and the management of fines and fees.

Alma is offered as a software as a service (SaaS) solution and supports multi-tenancy. Server infrastructure, database maintenance, and software updates are managed by Ex Libris. Configuration and data management are carried out via a web browser. User data are typically imported from external systems rather than collected directly within Alma. Individual libraries remain responsible for compliance with data protection regulations. For European customers, data are hosted in a data center located in Amsterdam.

The integrated tool Alma Analytics enables reporting and statistical analysis. Usage statistics for electronic resources can be generated directly within the system based on COUNTER reports.

== History ==
Alma was developed from 2009 onward by Ex Libris in cooperation with four development partners as a successor to the integrated library systems Aleph and Voyager.

An early adopter program was launched in 2011. Alma became commercially available in 2012 and was first implemented in production by the Boston College Library.

In Germany, Alma was first introduced in January 2015 at a university library. Since then, it has been adopted by numerous libraries across the DACH region. Globally, Alma is used by more than 2,000 libraries.

In the United Kingdom, Alma was implemented by the Bodleian Library in 2023 on behalf of the network of 96 separate library institutions that are part of the University of Oxford. The British Library moved on to Alma in January 2026, after the 2023 ransomware cyber-attack which damaged the legacy cataloguing infrastructure beyond repair.

== Additional aspects ==
In 2022, contracts between Ex Libris and institutions such as the Berlin University of the Arts and the Technical University of Berlin were published online following a request under the German Freedom of Information Act.

Alma integrates the management of physical, electronic, and digital resources within a unified system. It standardizes internal workflows across libraries and provides analytical tools as well as support for collaborative cataloguing and acquisitions.
