= Alma Bay, Queensland =

Alma Bay
- Town
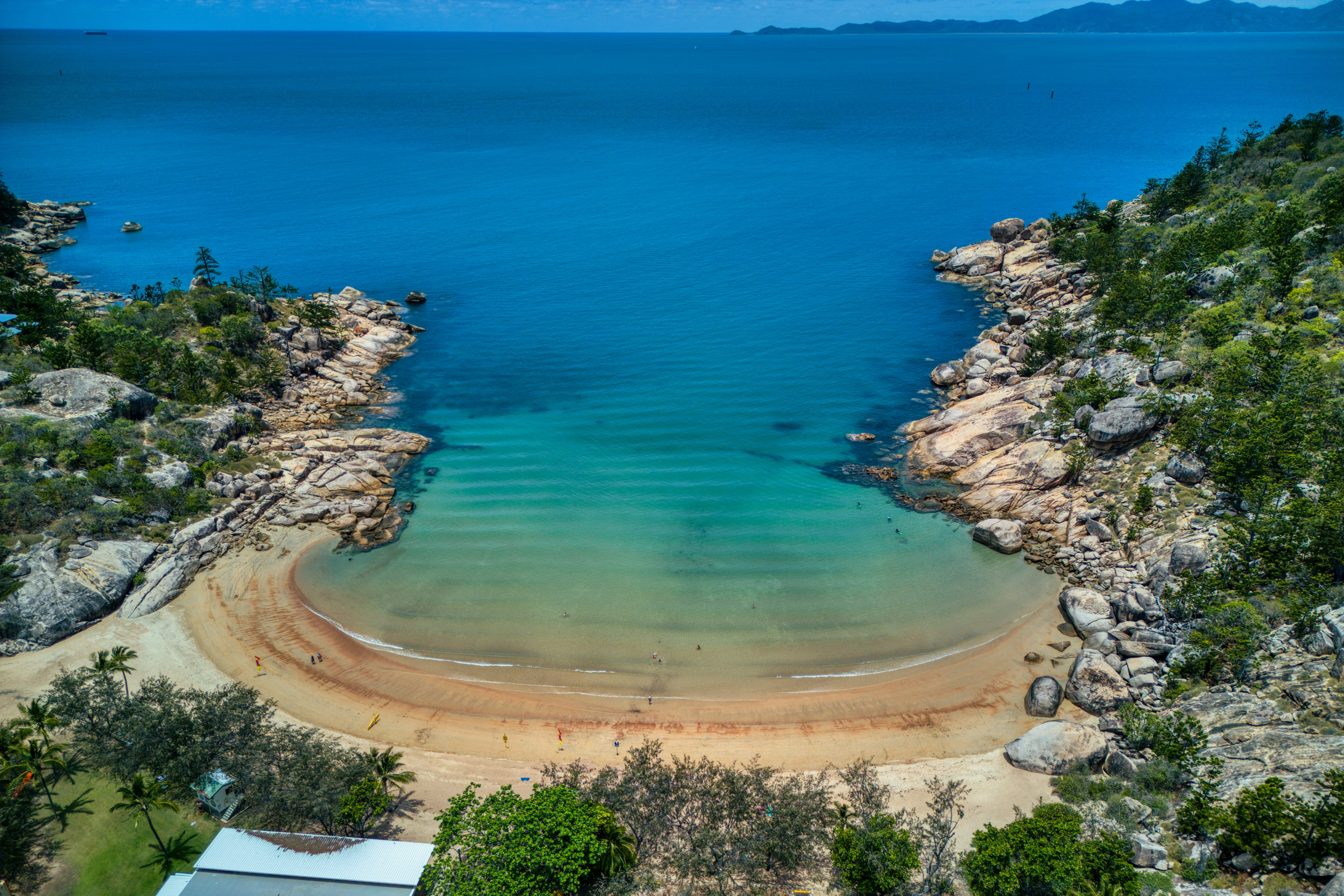
- Alma Bay, 2014

- Interactive map of Alma Bay
- Coordinates: 19.1483°S 146.8677°E
- Country: Australia
- State: Queensland
- City: Magnetic Island
- LGA: City of Townsville
- Location: 2.5 km (1.6 mi) NE of Nelly Bay, Queensland

Government
  - State electorate: Townsville
  - Federal division: Herbert
- Time zone: UTC+10:00 (AEST)
- Postcode: 4819

Alma Bay is an island town within the locality of Arcadia on Magnetic Island in the City of Townsville, Queensland, Australia.

== Geography ==
The town is at the bay of the same name on the western coast of Magnetic Island.

There is a war memorial at Alma Bay Park on Armand Way commemorating military personnel who died during World War I, World War II, the Vietnam War and other conflicts.

== History ==
A shark-proof net was installed in Alma Bay in December 1940.

== Education ==
There are no schools in Alma Bay. The nearest government primary school is Magnetic Island State School in Nelly Bay on the island. The nearest government secondary school is Townsville State High School in Railway Estate in the Townsville mainland.

== Events ==
An annual Anzac Day service is held at the war memorial.
