= Cârjiți =

- Commune
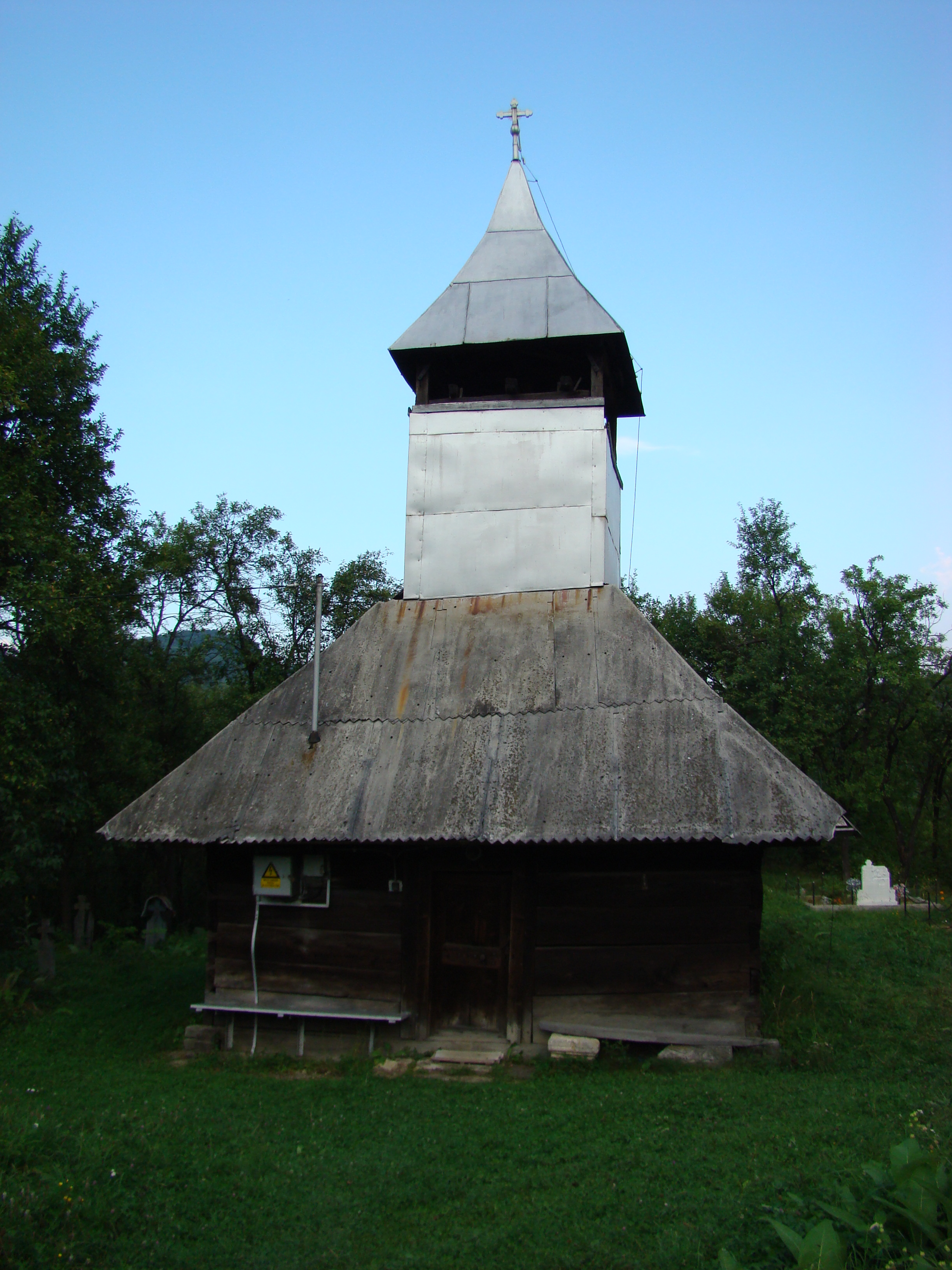
- Wooden church in Chergheș

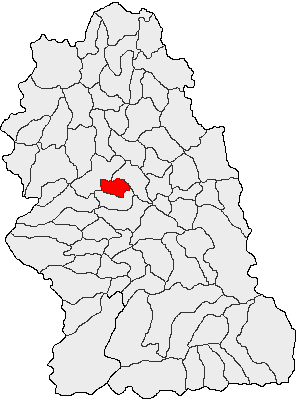
- Location in Hunedoara County

- Location in Romania
- Coordinates: 45°51′N 22°50′E
- Country: Romania
- County: Hunedoara

Government
  - Mayor (2024–2028): Daniela-Maria Adam (PNL)
- Area: 45.75 km^{2} (17.66 sq mi)
- Elevation: 370 m (1,210 ft)
- Population (2021-12-01): 686
  - Density: 15.0/km^{2} (38.8/sq mi)
- Time zone: UTC+02:00 (EET)
  - Summer (DST): UTC+03:00 (EEST)
- Postal code: 337175
- Area code: (+40) 0254
- Vehicle reg.: HD
- Website: primariacirjiti.ro

Cârjiți (Hungarian: Kersec, German: Kerschdorf) is a commune in Hunedoara County, Transylvania, Romania. It is composed of five villages: Almașu Sec (Szárazalmás), Cârjiți, Chergheș (Kerges), Cozia (Kozolya), and Popești (Popesd).

The commune is located in the central part of the county, 9 km (5.6 mi) west of the county seat, Deva, and 14 km (8.7 mi) northwest of the city of Hunedoara.

Historical population
| Year | Pop. | ±% |
|---|---|---|
| 1850 | 1,395 | — |
| 1910 | 2,149 | +54.1% |
| 2002 | 798 | −62.9% |
| 2011 | 681 | −14.7% |
| 2021 | 686 | +0.7% |
Source: Census data

== See also ==
- Dacian fortress of Cozia
