= Fatih Yılmaz (footballer, born 1989) =

Turkish footballer

Personal information
- Date of birth: 5 March 1989 (age 37)
- Place of birth: Hannover, West Germany
- Height: 1.74 m (5 ft 9 in)
- Position: Midfielder

Youth career
- –2005: VfB Hannover-Wülfel
- 2005–2007: Hannover 96
- 2007–2008: Eintracht Braunschweig

Senior career*
Years	Team	Apps	(Gls)
2008–2010	Eintracht Braunschweig II	23	(1)
2008–2010	Eintracht Braunschweig	3	(0)
2011	Manisaspor	0	(0)
2011–2012	Eintracht Nordhorn	7	(0)
2012	SV Wilhelmshaven	16	(1)
2013	Etar 1924	8	(0)
2013–2014	Denizlispor	2	(0)
2015	FSV Optik Rathenow	0	(0)
Total		59	(2)
- * Club domestic league appearances and goals

Fatih Yılmaz (born 5 March 1989) is a Turkish former professional footballer who played as a midfielder.

== Career ==
Born in Hannover, Yılmaz began his career in his hometown for VfB Hannover-Wülfel and in 2005 joined the youth team of Hannover 96. He played for Hannover 96 between 2005 and 2007 and signed then in the summer of the latter year with Eintracht Braunschweig. In May 2010 it was confirmed that his contract would not be renewed and he left the club on 30 June 2010.

In January 2011 he signed a contract with Türkcell Süper Lig club Manisaspor. However, after only a few months he returned to Germany and joined Eintracht Nordhorn in the fifth tier Niedersachsenliga. He signed with Regionalliga Nord club SV Wilhelmshaven during the winter break of the 2011–12 season.

== Personal life ==
Fatih is the older brother of Yusuf Yılmaz and both hold a German passport.
