= Almási =

Almási is a surname. Notable people with the surname include:

- Csaba Almási (born 1966), Hungarian long jumper
- István Almási (1944–2017), Hungarian teacher and politician
- Ladislav Almási (born 1999), Slovak footballer
- Lenke Almási (born 1965), Hungarian gymnast
- Péter Almási (born 1975), Hungarian sprint canoer
- Tamás Almási (born 1948), Hungarian documentary film director
- Zoltán Almási (born 1976), Hungarian chess player
