= Viktor Zikeev =

Surgeon and physician of the Kazakh Soviet Republic

Viktor Vasilyevich Zikeev (Russian: Виктор Васильевич Зикеев; 1892–1957) was a surgeon and physician of the Kazakh Soviet Socialist Republic.

A graduate of Moscow State University (1919), in 1936 he wrote a thesis on “Causalgia treatment” and in 1947 his thesis was on “Intracranial pressure”. He authored more than 50 research publications. From 1934 to 1943 he served as a rector of the Kazakh State Medical Institute, first deputy Minister of Health (1950 – 1952), and chief surgeon at the Ministry of Health (1943 – 1949).

Zikeev was honored for his contribution to medicine in Kazakhstan and the Soviet Union with the Order of Lenin and other distinguished medals.
