= Alma: The First Battle =

Board wargame published in 1978

Alma
- Designers: J. Matisse Enzer
- Illustrators: Redmond A. Simonsen
- Publishers: Simulations Publications Inc.
- Publication: 1978
- Genres: Crimean War

Alma: The First Battle, subtitled "20 September 1854", is a board wargame published by Simulations Publications Inc. (SPI) in 1978 that was one of the games in the Four Battles from the Crimean War "quadrigame" — a set of four thematically linked games that use the same set of rules. The game simulates the Battle of the Alma during the Crimean War.

== Background ==
In 1854, disagreements over Russian expansion into the Ottoman Empire led to a declaration of war between Imperial Russia on one side, and the United Kingdom, France and Sardinia on the other side. France and the UK immediately sent expeditionary forces to the Crimean Peninsula in mid-September 1854, where they landed only 45 kilometres (28 mi) from Sevastopol. This took the local Russian commander, Prince Alexander Sergeyevich Menshikov, by surprise — he had not expected enemy forces to act so late in the year. Menshikov set up his forces on the heights overlooking the Alma River, the only feasible defensive position between the Anglo-French forces and Sevastopol. On 20 September 1854, the three armies met in battle — the only time during the Crimean War when the British and French fought together.

== Description ==
Alma is a relatively simple games, using only 100 counters, a small 17" x 24" paper hex grid map, and a set of rules that deal with combat, movement, unit disruptions & rallying, and terrain. There are special rules for crossing the Alma River, line of sight to and from the heights overlooking the river, and artillery.

=== Gameplay ===
The game uses a simple "I Go, You Go" alternating series of turns, where the following phases are followed, first by the Allies, and then by the Russians:

- Movement: The active player moves units.
- Defensive Ranged Fire: The non-active player conducts defensive ranged fire.
- Offensive Ranged Fire: The active player fires ranged weapons.
- Melee: Any units belonging to the active player that are adjacent to enemy units may engage in melee (hand-to-hand) combat.
- Rally: The active player attempts to rally units that have been disrupted by enemy fire.

When both players have completed a turn, one game turn is finished. The game lasts for twelve turns.

=== Russian preservation ===
Starting on Turn 5 before Russian movement, the Russian player rolls a die and, to the roll, adds the number of Russian infantry units that have been eliminated to that point. If the total is more than 10, Russian Preservation is triggered: every turn from that point onward, the Russian player must exit two units off the map through a specific hex, removing them from the game. Failure to do so results in a loss of Victory Points for the Russian player. If Russian Preservation is not triggered on Turn 5, the Russian player continues to check on every subsequent turn either until it is triggered or the game ends.

=== Victory conditions ===
Both players earn Victory Points (VPs) for eliminating enemy units. Also, the Allied player earns VPs if the Russian Preservation rule is triggered before Turn 7. The Russian player earns VPs for each turn that Russian Preservation is not triggered.

At the end of the game, Russian VPs are subtracted from Allied VPs. If the result is 3 or more, the Allied player wins. If the result is zero or less, the Russian player wins. A result of 1 or 2 is a draw.

== Publication history ==
In 1975 SPI published their first quadrigame, Blue and Gray. After it proved to be popular, SPI quickly produced more quadrigames. One of these was 1978's Four Battles from the Crimean War, which included Alma, a game designed by J. Matisse Enzer, with graphic design by Redmond A. Simonsen. SPI quadrigames to that point had used a simple set of rules first developed for 1972's Napoleon at War, but SPI decided to develop a new ruleset for Crimean War, adding some complexity. The quadrigame initially proved popular, rising to #3 on SPI's Top Ten Bestseller list as soon as it was published and staying on the list for four months. Alma, along with the other three games in the Crimean War box, was also sold individually as a "folio" game, packaged in a cardstock folio.

After the demise of SPI, Decision Games acquired the rights to Alma in 2000, and republished it as a free pull-out game in Issue 201 of Strategy & Tactics.

== Reception ==
In Issue 16 of the UK wargaming magazine Phoenix, Donald Mack commented "While [Alma] lacks something as a simulation it is an enjoyable game and does not stray too far from the course of history."

In Issue 7 of The Wargamer, Jack Greene called this "a fun game to play and is not so historically weak as many previous SPI games." Greene concluded, "I wanted to play a second time."

In Issue 29 of Paper Wars, David Vandenbroucke noted that "Most command problems are simulated by what we are now calling 'idiocy rules', artificial restrictions on when and where units may move." Vandenbroucke concluded, "It stands up as a complete, tested game, with professional components and rules that don’t contradict each other. Thus, while it is something of a period piece, it's still a game worth playing."

== Other reviews and commentary ==
- Fire & Movement #17
- Panzerschreck #12
