= Șar (Mureș) =

Șar Sár-patak
- Location within Romania

Location
- Country: Romania
- Counties: Mureș County
- Villages: Fărăgău, Toldal, Păingeni, Glodeni

Physical characteristics
- Mouth: Mureș
  - location: Glodeni
  - coordinates: 46.6464°N 24.6134°E
- Length: 20 km (12 mi)
- Basin size: 103 km^{2} (40 sq mi)

Basin features
- Progression: Mureș→ Tisza→ Danube→ Black Sea
- Tributaries
  - right: Ercea, Almaș

The Șar (Hungarian: Sár-patak) is a right tributary of the river Mureș in Romania. It discharges into the Mureș in Glodeni. Its name originates from the Hungarian "sár" meaning “mud”, so the Hungarian name means “Muddy Creek”. Its length is 20 km (12 mi) and its basin size is 103 km^{2} (40 sq mi).
