= Almas Bobby =

Pakistani Activist

Almas Bobby is a Pakistani transgender activist and former television host. She is the President of the Shemale Foundation Pakistan.

In July 2018, Almas Bobby declared Rs. 100 million of assets in the tax amnesty scheme.
