= Almaz Sharman =

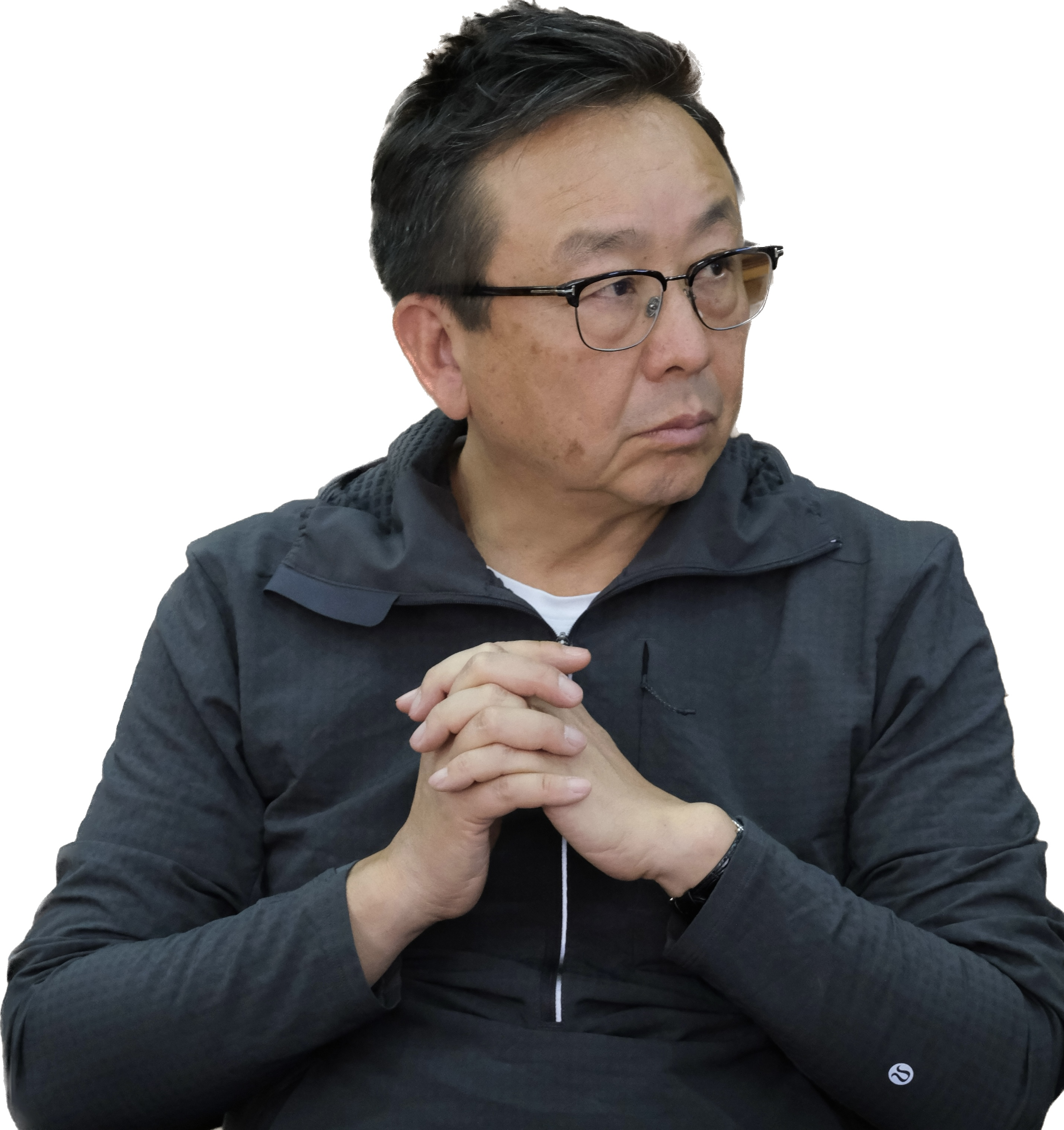
- Born: January 1, 1960 (age 66); Ulytau, Kazakhstan
- Education: Asfendiyarov National Medical University
- Occupation: President Academy of Preventive Medicine
- Children: 3
- Parent(s): Toregeldy Sharmanov; Kulzia Askarova

Almaz Sharman (born January 1, 1960) is the President of the Academy of Preventive Medicine of Kazakhstan and the National Center for Nutrition. Ethnic Kazakh and a citizen of the United States, Sharman has more than 30 years of experience in biomedical and clinical science and healthcare management.

== Early life and education ==
Sharman was born in Ulytau, Kazakhstan. He is the son of Toregeldy Sharmanov, who was Minister of Healthcare of the Republic of Kazakhstan from 1970 to 1981 and a co-author of the Alma-Ata Declaration of Primary Health Care, and Kulziya Askarova, medical doctor and radiologist. He was raised in Almaty, Kazakhstan.

Sharman graduated from Asfendiyarov National Medical University with an M.D. diploma (1982), and defended his M.S. dissertation in 1985 and his Ph.D in 1991.

== Career ==
Sharman worked at the University of Alabama at Birmingham as a member of an international team of biomedical researchers on a U.S. National Institutes of Health-funded study of mucosal immunology and oral vaccine development (1991 – 1993). The main focus of his research was on experimental models of hapten-induced Inflammatory bowel disease and studying intraepithelial lymphocytes.

Between 1994 and 2001, Sharman worked at International Demographic and Health Survey. He designed a methodology for integrated population-based HIV-testing which was implemented in several developing countries and has become a standard methodology for international demographic and health surveys. HIV testing data generated by using this methodology was recently used by UNAIDS to lower the estimate of the number of people afflicted by HIV in the world by 7 million cases. A multinational study of the anemia prevalence among women and children implemented under his leadership has led to improved anemia control and prevention and reproductive health programs in several countries in Central Asia, Egypt, and India.

In 1998-2003, Sharman was involved in university teaching as an Associate at the Johns Hopkins University's Bloomberg School of Public Health.

In 2001-2004 Sharman worked as Infectious Disease Advisor for US Agency for International Development (USAID) Regional Office for Central Asia. He provided technical advice and helped to develop and implement infectious disease prevention and control activities in Kazakhstan, Uzbekistan, Kyrgyz Republic, Tajikistan, and Turkmenistan. In 2004 – 2006 Almaz Sharman was USAID Country Office Coordinator for Kazakhstan; he served as a primary liaison official for the US Government assistance program with the Government of Kazakhstan, U.S. Embassy, USAID contractors and grantees, and international donor organizations.

During the last several years, Sharman concentrated on healthcare management and academic medicine. He was the founding CEO of the National Medical Holding, a project initiated in Kazakhstan's capital city of Astana with six modern hospitals, including the National Centers for Cardiac Surgery and Neurosurgery. Under his management, NMH hospitals have become accredited by the Joint Commission. Currently, Almaz Sharman serves as a member of the board of the National Center for Cardiac Surgery, where the doctors have performed implantations of heart Ventricular assist devices, Heart transplantation, and other technologies.

In April 2010, Dr. Sharman was appointed vice-president of the Nazarbayev University. He has worked to establish the Academic Healthcare System at Nazarbayev University, integrating patient care with biomedical research and education. Almaz Sharman founded the university's Center for Life Sciences, a biomedical research organization focusing on genomics and personalized medicine, translational research, regenerative medicine, and clinical research.

In 2012 Almaz Sharman was elected President of the Academy of Preventive Medicine, Kazakhstan's leading non-governmental multidisciplinary organization which addresses major public health concerns in Kazakhstan. He is current member of the American Public Health Association. In 2014, Dr. Sharman co-founded the HealthCity LLC, a private network of community-based centers for personal medicine and a diagnostic clinic in Almaty, Kazakhstan. He also founded Medtronic country office for Kazakhstan.

Dr. Sharman is a member of the International Commission on tuberculosis and co-author of the report entitled “ Building a tuberculosis-free world: The Lancet Commission on Tuberculosis”. The report, which was published in the prestigious international medical journal The Lancet, sets out targets to eliminate tuberculosis within a generation. Authors stress the need for accountability in TB - assessing progress in 10 high-burden countries and announcing the launch of The Lancet TB Observatory – an independent annual report evaluating progress towards the 2022 UN High-Level Meeting targets.

Dr. Sharman designed www.symptomaster.com, a technology product that helps patients assess more than 100 symptoms and make informed decisions about their health. In addition, he developed www.zdrav.kz, an extensive medical database of more than 1000 diseases and conditions. Currently, he concentrates his efforts in designing a mobile application called NutriSteppe that motivates users to choose healthy diets.

Dr. Sharman is chairman of the Board of Bulat Utemuratov Charity Foundation that is actively involved in supporting projects in the field of health, culture and education. The Foundation concentrates its efforts on supporting children with autism spectrum disorders (ADS), natural disaster emergency relief efforts, renovation of the Central Botanical Garden in Almaty, Kazakhstan, and other activities.

== Selected publications ==
Building a tuberculosis-free world: The Lancet Commission on tuberculosis. The Lancet, Vol. 393, No. 10178, March 20, 2019

A New Paradigm of Primary Health Care in Kazakhstan: Personalized, Community-based, Standardized, and Technology-driven. Sharman, A. Central Asian Journal of Global Health, 2014, Vol. 3, No. 1.

Preventive medicine is key to Healthcare in Kazakhstan, says professor of medicine. The Astana Times, 23 December 2013.

Tuberculosis in Kazakhstan: analysis of risk determinants in national surveillance data. Terlikbayeva A, Hermosilla S, Galea S, Schluger N, Yegeubayeva S, Abildayev T, Muminov T, Akiyanova F, Bartkowiak L, Zhumadilov Z, Sharman A, El-Bassel N. BMC Infect Dis. 2012 Oct 18;12:262. doi: 10.1186/1471-2334-12-262.

The scientific basis for healthy aging and anti-aging processes (monograph). Mary Ann Liebert inc. Publishers, New York, 2011.

Modernization and growth in Kazakhstan (editorial) Sharman, A. Central Asian Journal of Global Health, 2012, Vol 1, No 1.

Anemia among women and children. Sharman, A. Goldberg, H. in: Centers for Disease Control and Prevention and ORC Macro. 2003.

Reproductive, Maternal and Child Health in Eastern Europe and Eurasia: A Comparative Report. Atlanta, GA (USA) and Calverton, MD (USA). pp 155–163Dhs+: building the "h" in the demographic and health surveys. Almaz sharman. Measure dhs+, ORC Macro, American Public Health Association, 2001.

Anemia in Central Asia: demographic and health survey experience. Almaz Sharman. Food and Nutrition Bulletin, vol. 19, no. 4, 1998, The United Nations University Hapten-induced model of murine inflammatory bowel disease: mucosa immune responses and protection by tolerance. Elson CO, Beagley KW, Sharman A, Fujihashi K, Kiyono H, Tennyson GS, Cong Y, Black CA, Ridwan BW, McGhee JR. J Immunol. 1996 Sep 1;157(5):2174-85

Health care in Kazakhstan. Sharmanov T, McAlister A, Sharman A. World Health Forum. 1996;17(2):197-9. PMID 8936281 Differences in intraepithelial lymphocyte t cell subsets isolated from murine small versus large intestine. Beagley kw, fujihashi k, lagoo as, lagoo-deenadaylan s, black ca, murray am, sharman a, yamamoto m, mcghee jr, elson co, et al. J immunol. 1995 jun 1;154(11):5611-9.

RYR2 sequencing reveals novel missense mutations in a Kazakh idiopathic ventricular tachycardia study cohort. Akilzhanova A, Guelly C, Nuralinov O, Nurkina Z, Nazhat D, Smagulov S, Tursunbekov A, Alzhanova A, Rashbayeva G, Abdrakhmanov A, Dosmagambet S, Trajanoski S, Zhumadilov Z, Sharman A, Bekbosynova M. PLoS One. 2014 Jun 30;9(6):e101059. doi: 10.1371/journal.pone.0101059. eCollection 2014.

Levels and distribution of self-rated health in the Kazakh population: results from the Kazakhstan household health survey 2012. Supiyev A, Nurgozhin T, Zhumadilov Z, Sharman A, Marmot M, Bobak M. BMC Public Health. 2014 Jul 30;14:768. doi: 10.1186/1471-2458-14-768.
