= List of shipwrecks in June 1859 =

The list of shipwrecks in June 1859 includes ships sunk, foundered, grounded, or otherwise lost during June 1859.

== 1 June ==
List of shipwrecks: 1 June 1859
Ship	State	Description
Arcade	United Kingdom	The barque was damaged by fire at New Orleans, Louisiana, United States.
Sumatra	Netherlands	The ship capsized at Portsmouth, Hampshire, United Kingdom.

== 2 June ==
List of shipwrecks: 2 June 1859
Ship	State	Description
Emperor	United Kingdom	The barque ran aground on the Newcombe Sand, in the North Sea off the coast of Suffolk. She was on a voyage from London to Sunderland, County Durham. She was refloated and taken in to Lowestoft, Suffolk.
Fly	United Kingdom	The schooner ran aground at South Shields, County Durham. She was refloated with the assistance of four tugs and towed to Walker, Northumberland in a leaky condition.
Iris	United Kingdom	The schooner ran aground at North Shields, County Durham. She was on a voyage from Newcastle upon Tyne, Northumberland to North Shields. She was refloated and found to be leaky.
Minerva	United Kingdom	The barque was abandoned in the Atlantic Ocean. Her crew were rescued by Caroline Agnes (United Kingdom). Minerva was on a voyage from Cardiff, Glamorgan to Galle, Ceylon.
Sir Charles Napier	United Kingdom	The ship foundered in the Indian Ocean 60 nautical miles (110 km) off Acheen, Netherlands East Indies. Her crew took to three boats. Fourteen crew were rescued by Melanie (United Kingdom). Sir Charles Napier was on a voyage from Rangoon, Burma to an English port.
United Kingdom	United Kingdom	The steamship ran aground in the Clyde at Bowling, Dunbartonshire.

== 3 June ==
List of shipwrecks: 3 June 1859
Ship	State	Description
Christine	Norway	The brig ran aground at South Shields, County Durham, United Kingdom. She was refloated.
Undaunted	Sweden	The ship foundered off Lindisfarne, Northumberland, United Kingdom with the loss of three of her seven crew. Survivors took to the longboat and were rescued by Johanne Marie (Netherlands). Undaunted was on a voyage from Helsingborg to Alloa, Clackmannanshire, United Kingdom.
HMY Victoria and Albert	Royal Navy	The Royal yacht ran aground in the Scheldt.
Whisker	(United Kingdom of Great Britain and Ireland) Jersey	The cutter struck a rock and sank in St. Clement's Bay. Her crew were rescued. She was on a voyage from Saint-Brieuc, Côtes-du-Nord, France to Jersey.

== 4 June ==
List of shipwrecks: 4 June 1859
Ship	State	Description
Eastern Monarch	United Kingdom	Eastern Monarch The troopship exploded, caught fire and sank in the Solent off Spithead, Hampshire with the loss of at least seven, and up to 30, lives amongst the 464 people on board. Survivors were rescued by boats from HMS Falcon and HMS Flying Fish (both Royal Navy) and the pilot boat Fawn (United Kingdom). Eastern Monarch was on a voyage from Kurrachee, India to Gravesend, Kent.
Mary Virginia	(United Kingdom of Great Britain and Ireland) British North America	The schooner was driven ashore and wrecked on Seal Island, Nova Scotia. She was on a voyage from Boston, Massachusetts to St. Peter's, Nova Scotia.
Shepherd	United Kingdom	The brig ran aground at South Shields, County Durham. She was on a voyage from South Shields to London. She was refloated and put back to South Shields in a leaky condition.
Vitula	(United Kingdom of Great Britain and Ireland) Jersey	The ship was driven ashore at Havre aux Maisons, Magdalen Islands, Province of Canada, British North America. She was consequently condemned, but was later refloated.
Waterwitch	United Kingdom	The barque was wrecked on the Isle of Lions, off Montevideo, Uruguay. Her crew were rescued. She was on a voyage from Liverpool, Lancashire to Montevideo.

== 5 June ==
List of shipwrecks: 5 June 1859
Ship	State	Description
Esse	Kingdom of Hanover	The ship foundered in the Sea of Marmora. Her crew were rescued. She was on a voyage from London, United Kingdom to Constantinople and Galaţi, Ottoman Empire.

== 6 June ==
List of shipwrecks: 6 June 1859
Ship	State	Description
Annabella	United Kingdom	The brig was driven ashore at Margate, Kent. She was on a voyage from Hartlepool, County Durham to Poole, Dorset. She was refloated.
Caledonia	United Kingdom	The schooner ran aground on the Britaree Rocks, north east of Östergarnsholm, Sweden. She was on a voyage from Kronstadt, Russia to London. She was refloated the next day and resumed her voyage.
Elk	United Kingdom	The paddle steamer struck rocks near Groomsport, County Down and was wrecked. All on board were rescued. She was on a voyage from Glasgow, Renfrewshire to Belfast, County Antrim. She broke in two; both sections were subsequently refloated and taken in to Belfast with the intention of rebuilding, but she was scrapped in December.
Gitana	United Kingdom	The steamship put in to West Hartlepool, County Durham with her cargo of shoddy on fire. She was on a voyage from "Diorn" to Hamburg. The fire was extinguished.
Lopie	(Russia) Grand Duchy of Finland	The schooner was driven ashore at Höganäs Sweden. She was on a voyage from Newcastle upon Tyne, Northumberland, United Kingdom to Helsinki.
Sir George Anderson	United Kingdom	The ship was dismasted off the Cape of Good Hope, Cape Colony and was abandoned in a sinking condition. Her crew were rescued by Argonaut (United States). Sir George Anderson was on a voyage from Madras, India to London.

== 7 June ==
List of shipwrecks: 7 June 1859
Ship	State	Description
Star of the North	United Kingdom	The ship ran aground on the Cockle Sand, in the North Sea off the coast of Norfolk. She was refloated.
Ulysses	United Kingdom	The ship was abandoned off the coast of the Cape Colony. Her crew were rescued by Chandernagor ( India). Ulysses was on a voyage from Bombay, India to London. She was subsequently taken in to Algoa Bay.
William Gowland	United Kingdom	The brig was driven ashore at Shakespeare Cliff, Dover, Kent. She was on a voyage from Bordeaux, Gironde, France to Sunderland, County Durham. She was refloated and taken in to Dover.

== 8 June ==
List of shipwrecks: 8 June 1859
Ship	State	Description
George Marshall	United Kingdom	The ship was driven ashore at Gellibrand's Point, Victoria. She was on a voyage from London to Melbourne, New South Wales. She was refloated the next day and resumed her voyage.

== 10 June ==
List of shipwrecks: 10 June 1859
Ship	State	Description
Ann	United Kingdom	The ship was abandoned off Bardsey Island, Pembrokeshire and foundered. Her crew survived.
Frouwina	Netherlands	The ship foundered in the English Channel 6 nautical miles (11 km) off Cabourg, Calvados, France. Her crew were rescued. She was on a voyage from Rio de Janeiro, Brazil to Falmouth, Cornwall, United Kingdom and Havre de Grâce, Seine-Inférieure, France.
Radius	United Kingdom	The brig was wrecked at Whitehead, Nova Scotia, British North America. Her crew were rescued. She was on a voyage from Newhaven, Connecticut, United States to Miramichi, New Brunswick, British North America.

== 11 June ==
List of shipwrecks: 11 June 1859
Ship	State	Description
Spray	United Kingdom	The ship was wrecked on a reef off Pernambuco, Brazil.

== 12 June ==
List of shipwrecks: 12 June 1859
Ship	State	Description
Alma	United Kingdom	The steamship was wrecked on the Mooshedjerah Reef, in the Red Sea (13°48′N 43°53′E). HMS Cyclops (Royal Navy) rescued 172 people. A further 157 people also survived, including eleven rescued by Como (United States). Alma was carrying 222 crew and about 140 passengers. She was on a voyage from Aden to Suez, Egypt.

== 13 June ==
List of shipwrecks: 13 June 1859
Ship	State	Description
Elizabeth Walker	United Kingdom	The ship collided with Red Jacket (United Kingdom) and foundered between 2 June and 18 August. Her crew were rescued by Red Jacket. Elizabeth Walker was on a voyage from Buenos Aires, Argentina to London.
Maria	Belgium	The schooner foundered 10 nautical miles (19 km) off Dover, Kent, United Kingdom. Her crew were rescued by Queen of the Belgians (United Kingdom). Maria was on a voyage from "Regujiada" to Antwerp.

== 14 June ==
List of shipwrecks: 14 June 1859
Ship	State	Description
David Grant	United Kingdom	The ship was driven ashore in the Tillen and was abandoned by her crew. She was on a voyage from Hartlepool, County Durham to Hamburg.
Emerald	United Kingdom	The brig ran aground on the Salvo Reef, off Fårö, Sweden. Her crew were rescued. She was on a voyage from Norrköping, Sweden to Riga, Russia.
Stric Lutchmee Pursad	India	The ship was driven ashore and wrecked at Cape Negrais, Burma There were 21 survivors. She was on a voyage from Madras to Moulmein, Burma.

== 15 June ==
List of shipwrecks: 15 June 1859
Ship	State	Description
Cheapside	United Kingdom	The ship ran aground on Video Island, in the Fisherman's Group and sank. Her crew survived. She was on a voyage from Bangkok, Siam to Shanghai, China.
Jane and Isabella	United Kingdom	The ship was wrecked on Juan de Nova Island, off Madagascar. Her crew survived. She was on a voyage from South Shields, County Durham to Aden.
Nelly Southard	UKGBI	The ship was wrecked on Grand Manan Island, Nova Scotia, British North America. Her crew were rescued. She was on a voyage from Saint John, New Brunswick, British North America to Penarth, Glamorgan.
Sabina	United Kingdom	The barque was wrecked on the English Bank, in the River Plate. Her crew were rescued. She was on a voyage from Montevideo, Uruguay to Liverpool, Lancashire.

== 16 June ==
List of shipwrecks: 16 June 1859
Ship	State	Description
Blenheim	United Kingdom	The East Indiaman foundered in the Indian Ocean. Her crew took to two boats and landed on Ramree Island, Burma, where one of the boats capsized with the loss of thirteen of her crew. Blenheim was on a voyage from Akyab, Burma to Calcutta, India.
Bolton	United States	The ship was wrecked on Cross Island, Maine with the loss of fifteen of the eighteen people on board. She was on a voyage from Bath, Maine to Saint John, New Brunswick, British North America.
Premier	United Kingdom	The ship foundered in the Atlantic Ocean 200 nautical miles (370 km) west of Tristan d'Acunha. Her crew were rescued by Amisia (Hanover). Premier was on a voyage from Liverpool, Lancashire to Bombay, India.
Vigilant	(United Kingdom of Great Britain and Ireland) British North America	The barque was driven ashore and wrecked at Buctouche, New Brunswick.

== 17 June ==
List of shipwrecks: 17 June 1859
Ship	State	Description
Clymene	United Kingdom	The ship ran aground and was damaged at Whitby, Yorkshire. She was on a voyage from Grimsby, Lincolnshire to Whitby.
Dauntless	United Kingdom	The ship sprang a leak and sank in the North Sea (56°10′N 5°02′E). Her crew were rescued by the barque Go-ahead (United Kingdom). Dauntless was on a voyage from Hull, Yorkshire to Kronstadt, Russia.
Galatee	United Kingdom	The schooner sprang a leak and sank in the Firth of Forth 7 nautical miles (13 km) east of St. Andrews, Fife. Her crew were rescued. She was on a voyage from the River Tyne to Dundee, Forfarshire.
Jacob	United Kingdom	The barque ran aground on the Turneffe Atoll. She was on a voyage from Belize City, British Honduras to Liverpool, Lancashire. She was refloated.
Moira	United Kingdom	The ship caught fire at Leith, Lothian and was scuttled. She was severely damaged.
Petite Hermine	(United Kingdom of Great Britain and Ireland) British North America	The brig was driven ashore and wrecked on Little Miquelon. She was on a voyage from Quebec City, Province of Canada to Queenstown, County Cork.
West Chirton	United Kingdom	The brig sprang a leak and foundered in the North Sea. Her nine crew were rescued by the brig Ann Louisa (United Kingdom). West Chirton was on a voyage from Newcastle upon Tyne, Northumberland to Helsinki, Grand Duchy of Finland.
Wolfe	United Kingdom	The ship foundered in the Indian Ocean. Her crew were rescued. She was on a voyage from "Kooria Mooria" (Khuriya Muriya Islands) to Liverpool.

== 18 June ==
List of shipwrecks: 18 June 1859
Ship	State	Description
Grange	United Kingdom	The ship sprang a leak and put in to Falmouth, Cornwall, where she ran aground. She was on a voyage from Saint-Gilles, France to Preston, Lancashire. She was refloated.
Sea Belle	United States	The ship ran aground on a sunken wreck at Richibucto, New Brunswick, British North America. She was on a voyage from Richibucto to Boston, Massachusetts. She was refloated on 20 June and towed back to Richibucto.
Thetis	United Kingdom	The ship was wrecked at Dunnet Head, Caithness.

== 19 June ==
List of shipwrecks: 19 June 1859
Ship	State	Description
Corinthian Lass	United Kingdom	The ship ran aground at North Shields, County Durham. She was refloated.
Francis Joseph	Austrian Empire	Second Italian War of Independence: The steamboat was shelled by Piedmontese artillery and sank in Lake Garda off Salò, Kingdom of Lombardy–Venetia with the loss of all 200 people on board.
Jane and Isabella	United Kingdom	The barque was wrecked on a reef 300 nautical miles (560 km) south of Aden.

== 21 June ==
List of shipwrecks: 21 June 1859
Ship	State	Description
City of Pekin	United Kingdom	The ship ran aground in the Hooghly River. She was on a voyage from the Clyde to Calcutta, India. She was refloated on 23 June.
Seranger	(United Kingdom of Great Britain and Ireland) Jersey	The ship foundered at sea. Her crew were rescued by the barque Australia ( Grand Duchy of Oldenburg).

== 22 June ==
List of shipwrecks: 22 June 1859
Ship	State	Description
Bretagne	France	The ship was wrecked on the Goodwin Sands, Kent, United Kingdom. Her four crew were rescued by the lugger Neptune (United Kingdom.
Falcon	United Kingdom	The ship struck a sunken object and sank in the Bay of Biscay. Her crew were rescued by Crocodile (United Kingdom). Falcon was on a voyage from Swansea, Glamorgan to Marseille, Bouches-du-Rhône, France.
Melita	United States	The ship ran aground in the Amoor River and sank. She was on a voyage from De Castries Bay to "Nicolaefsky".

== 23 June ==
List of shipwrecks: 23 June 1859
Ship	State	Description
Lady Ann	United Kingdom	The ship ran aground on the Newcombe Sand, in the North Sea off the coast of Suffolk. She was on a voyage from Middlesbrough, Yorkshire to Fécamp, Seine-Inférieure, France. She was refloated and taken in to Lowestoft, Suffolk.
Josephine	United States	The ship was destroyed by fire at Mauritius. She was on a voyage from Akyab, Burma to Falmouth, Cornwall, United Kingdom.

== 24 June ==
List of shipwrecks: 24 June 1859
Ship	State	Description
Marchioness	United Kingdom	While heading into Queen Charlotte Sound, New Zealand for shelter from a gale the ship hit a submerged rock and began taking on water. Her captain beached the ship to prevent her from sinking. She was later salvaged and returned to service..

== 25 June ==
List of shipwrecks: 25 June 1859
Ship	State	Description
Drie Broeders	Netherlands	The ship was wrecked at Fjaltring, Denmark. She was on a voyage from Schiedam, South Holland to Königsberg, Prussia.
HMS Kestrel	Royal Navy	Second Opium War, Second Battle of Taku Forts: While attacking the Taku Forts, the Clown-class gunvessel was sunk in the Peiho river by Chinese artillery. She was later refloated and taken in tow by HMS Janus (Royal Navy).
HMS Lee	Royal Navy	Second Opium War, Second Battle of Taku Forts: While attacking the Taku Forts, the Algerine-class gunboat was sunk in the Peiho River by Chinese artillery.
London	United Kingdom	The ship capsized and sank in the East River. She was refloated on 30 June.
HMS Plover	Royal Navy	Second Opium War, Second Battle of Taku Forts: While attacking the Taku Forts, the Albacore-class gunvessel was sunk in the Peiho River by Chinese artillery. She was subsequently set afire by the Chinese.
Silistria	Ottoman Empire	The steamship sprang a leak and foundered in the Mediterranean Sea off Alexandria, Egypt with the loss of 77 of the 350 passengers on board. Survivors were rescued by an Egyptian vessel. It was reported that some of the Christian passengers were murdered by her captain and crew. Silistria was on a voyage from Alexandria to Constantinople.
Thetis	United Kingdom	The ship was driven ashore and wrecked on Stroma, Caithness. Her eight crew survived. She was on a voyage from Riga, Russia to Drogheda, County Louth.
Victoria	Norway	The ship was driven ashore and wrecked at the Nakkehead Lighthouse, Sweden. She was on a voyage from Middlesbrough, Yorkshire, United Kingdom to Kronstadt, Russia.

== 26 June ==
List of shipwrecks: 26 June 1859
Ship	State	Description
Amerika	Denmark	The brig was wrecked on Læsø. She was on a voyage from "Swartvok" to Cardiff, Glamorgan, United Kingdom.
Anna	Danzig	The ship sprang a leak and was beached on Skagen, Denmark. she was on a voyage from Danzig to Hull, Yorkshire, United Kingdom. She had broken up by 29 June.
HMS Cormorant	Royal Navy	Second Opium War, Second Battle of Taku Forts: While attacking the Taku Forts, the Vigilant-class gunvessel was sunk in the Peiho River by Chinese artillery. She was refloated on 27 June.
HMS Haughty	Royal Navy	Second Opium War, Second Battle of Taku Forts: While attacking the Taku Forts, the Albacore-class gunvessel was sunk in the Peiho river by Chinese artillery. She was later refloated.
Robert	United Kingdom	The ship was wrecked at Tushan, China with the loss of five of her crew.
Sarah	United Kingdom	The barque ran aground on the Platters, off the coast of Essex. She was on a voyage from Newcastle upon Tyne, Northumberland to Marseille, Bouches-du-Rhône. France. She was refloated the next day and resumed her voyage.
HMS Starling	Royal Navy	Second Opium War, Second Battle of Taku Forts: While attacking the Taku Forts, the Dapper-class gunvessel was sunk in the Peiho River by Chinese artillery. She was refloated.

== 27 June ==
List of shipwrecks: 27 June 1859
Ship	State	Description
Shah Jehan	India	The full-rigged ship caught fire in the Indian Ocean. She was abandoned on 27 June with the loss of 365 lives. About 60 survivors were rescued by Vasco de Gama (France). Shah Jehan was on a voyage from Calcutta to Mauritius.

== 28 June ==
List of shipwrecks: 28 June 1859
Ship	State	Description
Argo	United Kingdom	The passenger ship was wrecked in thick fog on a reef in Trepassey Bay off the coast of Newfoundland, British North America. All on board survived.
Belmont	United Kingdom	The ship was driven ashore in the Gulf of Kalamati near "Marathonesse", Greece. She was on a voyage from Soukoum Kaleh, Russia to Liverpool, Lancashire. Belmont was refloated on 4 July and taken in to "Trinos".
HMS Cormorant	Royal Navy	Second Opium War, Second Battle of Taku Forts: The Vigilant-class gunboat ran aground in the Peiho River and was sunk by Chinese artillery.
Fly	United Kingdom	The schooner was wrecked in Lunan Bay.
Friesland	Netherlands	The ship ran aground on the Longsand, in the North Sea off the coast of Essex, United Kingdom. She was on a voyage from Amsterdam, North Holland to Batavia, Netherlands East Indies. She was refloated and towed in to Harwich, Essex.
Sarah Minot	United Kingdom	The ship was destroyed by fire in the Atlantic Ocean. Her crew were rescued by Retriever (United Kingdom). She was on a voyage from New Orleans, Louisiana, United States to Liverpool, Lancashire.

== 30 June ==
List of shipwrecks: 30 June 1859
Ship	State	Description
Belisima	United Kingdom	The barque was driven ashore on Hogland, Russia. She was on a voyage from Kronstadt, Russia to Melbourne, Victoria. She was later refloated, and resumed her voyage, but put in to Hamina, Grand Duchy of Finland on 3 July in a leaky condition.
Bona Dea	United Kingdom	The ship foundered off the Cape of Good Hope, Cape Colony. She was on a voyage from Moulmein, Burma to Queenstown, County Cork.
Hope	United Kingdom	The schooner sprang a leak and sank in the English Channel 12 nautical miles (22 km) west of Start Point, Devon.
John Wesley	United Kingdom	The ship ran aground on the Holm Sand, in the North Sea off the coast of Suffolk. She was refloated.
Paramatta	United Kingdom	Paramatta, Medway and Wye. The Royal Mail Steam Packet Company paddle steamer was wrecked on Horseshoe Reef in the Virgin Islands. All on board, about 280 people, were rescued by Conway, Medway, and Wye (all United Kingdom). Paramatta was on her maiden voyage, from Southampton, Hampshire to Saint Thomas, Virgin Islands.
William Gibson	United Kingdom	The ship was abandoned off Cape Frio, Brazil. Her crew were rescued by a fishing smack She was on a voyage from the Clyde to Valparaíso, Chile.

== Unknown date ==
List of shipwrecks: Unknown date in June 1859
Ship	State	Description
Alderman Pirie	United Kingdom	The ship was abandoned in the Atlantic Ocean. Her crew were rescued by Siam (United Kingdom). Alderman Pirie was on a voyage from Sunderland, County Durham to Quebec City, Province of Canada, British North America.
Angeline	United Kingdom	The ship was abandoned off the Cape of Good Hope, Cape Colony before 27 June. Her crew were rescued by Simonds (United Kingdom).
Annie	(United Kingdom of Great Britain and Ireland) Cape Colony	The schooner was wrecked at the Cape of Good Hope.
Ann Roxby	United Kingdom	The ship was destroyed by fire in the Atlantic Ocean before 12 June. Her crew were rescued by Pharamond (United Kingdom). Ann Roxby was on a voyage from Liverpool, Lancashire to Pernambuco, Brazil.
Assens	Denmark	The schooner ran aground on Trellenaeshage. She was on a voyage from Newcastle upon Tyne, Northumberland, United Kingdom to Assens. She was refloated and completed her voyage in a leaky condition, arriving on 17 June.
Cleopatra	United Kingdom	The ship was driven ashore in the Magdalen Islands, Nova Scotia, British North America. She was on a voyage from Miramichi, New Brunswick, British North America to Fleetwood, Lancashire. She was refloated and completed her voyage, arriving at Fleetwood on 23 June.
Edward Herbert	United Kingdom	The ship was severely damaged by fire at Valparaíso, Chile.
Emily	United Kingdom	The ship was wrecked. She was on a voyage from New York to Newfoundland, British North America.
Eveline	United Kingdom	The ship ran aground in Thornhill's Channel. She was on a voyage from Calcutta, India to London. She was refloated and put back to Calcutta in a leaky condition.
Flora	(United Kingdom of Great Britain and Ireland) Cape Colony	The brig was driven ashore in Walvis Bay with the loss of more than five lives.
Imperador	Brazil	The ship foundered in the Atlantic Ocean. She was on a voyage from Bahia to Falmouth, Cornwall, United Kingdom.
John Wade	United States	The ship was abandoned in the Gulf of Siam.
Josephine Idel	France	The ship ran aground on the Goodwin Sands, Kent, United Kingdom. She was on a voyage from Marseille, Bouches-du-Rhône to Saint Petersburg, Russia. She was refloated.
Kars	Ottoman Empire	The steamship foundered in the Mediterranean Sea off the coast of Ottoman Syria. She was carrying 300 passengers. She was on a voyage from Alexandria, Egypt to Constantinople.
Kate Prendergast	United Kingdom	The ship was wrecked. she was on a voyage from St. Jago de Cuba, Cuba to Newfoundland.
Leontine	Sweden	The ship was abandoned in the North Sea. Her crew were rescued by the full-rigged ship Emanuel (Norway). Leontine was on a voyage from Skellefteå to Hull, Yorkshire, United Kingdom. She was taken in to Mandal, Norway in a derelict condition on 22 June.
Mary Prescott	United States	The ship was driven ashore and wrecked at Buenos Aires, Argentina.
Osmond	(United Kingdom of Great Britain and Ireland) Cape Colony	The ship was wrecked at Port Beaufort.
Protège de Marie	France	The ship sank at Hennebont, Morbihan. She was on a voyage from Hennebont to New Ross, County Wexford, United Kingdom.
Shepherdess	United Kingdom	The barque was wrecked in Algoa Bay with the loss of twelve of her fourteen crew.
Tulloch Castle	United Kingdom	The ship was driven ashore and wrecked in Combermere Bay, Burma before 24 June.
Two unidentified schooners	Flags unknown	One was driven ashore, above the spring high tide mark, in Par harbour, Cornwall during ″very considerable oscillations of the sea″. A second schooner's hawsers parted and she was driven out of the harbour by the current and went ashore nearby. This was on 25 or 26 June.
