= Almașu Mic =

Almașu Mic may refer to several villages in Romania:

- Almașu Mic, a village in Sârbi Commune, Bihor County
- Almașu Mic, a village in Balc Commune, Bihor County
- Almașu Mic, a village in Pestișu Mic Commune, Hunedoara County
- Almașu Mic de Munte, a village in Balșa Commune, Hunedoara County
