= Ahmet Almaz =

Turkish journalist

Ahmet Almaz is a Turkish journalist, translator, and non-fiction writer.

Almaz was born in Anamur. He attended school in Konya, Ceyhan, Karaman and Anamur. He went to university in 1993, publishing his first work, The Birth of Stars (prepared with Dr. Ahmet Gül), in 1997 through Gonca Publishing.

In 2002 Almaz carried out research for the Foreign Affairs department of the newly formed Ak Party. The same year he published The Duties of the Children, or Golden Advices to the Children, through Birey Publishing.

Presently Almaz works for the Istanbul Chamber of Commerce, where he writes about the history of trade. He also contributes weekly to the Anayurt newspaper, and has a column in the Turkish daily Bugün newspaper.

Almaz's other works include:

- A Mysterious Page of the History/Converts and the reality of the convertsi Kültür Publishing and Distribution, İstanbul 2002
- The History of Karahans with Assistant Professor Hacı Yakup Anat’, Oku Publishing, İstanbul, 2003
- The Memories of the Great Veteran / The Memories of Atatürk, Oku Publishing, İstanbul, 2003. (T.C: Recommended by Interior Ministry of Republic of Turkey.) 5. Edition, May 2008 Dinazor Publishing. (15.000 Copy)

He has translated a number of novels by Corci Zeydan:

- The Beauty of Fergana, Bilge Publishing, İstanbul, 2004
- Sultan Abbase, Bilge Publishing, İstanbul, 2004
- 17 Ramadan Assassination, Bilge Publishing, İstanbul, 2004
- How was Fatih Sultan Mehmet Killed? With documents that hidden in the State Archives of Venice 1-3. Edition Ocak-Şubat 2007 Nokta Kitap (25.000 Copy)
- The History of Jews – (with the supplement of Prof. Dr. İlber Ortayli’s Modernization of Ottomans and Converts) (with Pelin Batu) 1-3. Edition April – September 2007, Nokta Kitap
- How was Prophet Muhammed poisoned? - June 2007, Nokta Kitap
- The Book that Atatürk read in 3 days - Is it possible to reject God? - Yakamoz Publishing, May 2008
- The Turkish Children of Torah (With the supplement of Prof. Dr. İlber Ortayli’s Otoman Jews), Yakamoz Publishing, June 2008 First Edition 25.000 Copy. (Total Ş 40.000 Copy) 8-Shekhina Postiga Publishing 2010
- Turks and Islam – with Prof. Dr. İlber Ortayli, Prof. Dr. Nevzat Yalçıntaş and Prof. Dr. Mümtazör Türköne. Yakamoz Publishing October 2008.

He has also collaborated with Prof. Dr. Nevzat Yalçıntaş on the following works:

- Iraq Adventure of America, Kutup Yıldızı Publishing, İstanbul 2005. 2. Edition Yakamoz Publishing, 2008
- European Union and Cyprus, Kutup Yıldızı Publishing, İstanbul 2005, European Union and Turkey/ Nokta Kitap, 2006, 2. Edition
- Ascended Crescent on Europe, Pegasus Publishing, 2006
- Turkish Union/Resurrection Again, Nokta Kitap, 2007
