= Mussa Sima =

Tanzanian politician

Honorable Mussa Sima MP

Member of Parliament
- Incumbent
- Assumed office 2015
- Preceded by: Mohammed Dewji
- Constituency: Singida Town Constituency

Personal details
- Born: Mussa Ramadhani Sima; June 6, 1976 (age 49) Singida Region, Tanzania
- Party: Party of the Revolution
- Education: Mwenge Secondary School; Mwenge High School
- Alma mater: University of Dodoma; Open University of Tanzania

Mussa Ramadhani Sima (born June 6, 1976), is a Tanzanian politician presently serves as a Chama Cha Mapinduzi's Member of Parliament for Singida Town Constituency since November 2015. He was deputy minister Vice President's office responsible for union affairs and environment from 2018 to 2020 appointed by President John Magufuli.

He is the president of the Alumni Association of the Open University of Tanzania.
