= ALMA Magazine =

Spanish-language lifestyle magazine

ALMA
- CEO: Alejandro Gasquet
- Categories: Lifestyle
- Frequency: Monthly
- Publisher: Alejandro Gasquet
- Total circulation: 510,000
- First issue: 2005; 21 years ago
- Final issue Number: 2022; 4 years ago Vol 162 No 2
- Country: United States
- Based in: Buenos Aires
- Language: Spanish
- Website: almamagazine.com
- OCLC: 70146059

ALMA was a Spanish-language lifestyle magazine published in the United States for the Hispanic community. The magazine was founded in 2005 and hasn't been published since 2022 It focuses mainly on culture, fashion and politics.

At the beginning It was published in Argentina ten times a year. The magazine had its headquarters for production and content development in Buenos Aires and had also an office for marketing and advertising sales in Miami. Later it began to be published by Alma Magazine Corp in Miami. Its target audience is upscale Hispanic adults.
