= Almas Hospital =

Geography
- Location: Kottakkal, Kerala, India
- Coordinates: 10.999476°N 75.991041°E

Services
- Beds: 380

Links
- Lists: Hospitals in India

Almas Hospital is a health care facility in Kottakkal, Kerala, India. It is a 400-bed hospital with 24-hour laboratory, medical lab and scanning services.
