= Almash =

Almash Алмаш
- Village
- Location within Bashkortostan Location within Russia
- Coordinates: 54°51′N 54°11′E
- Country: Russia
- Region: Bashkortostan
- District: Sharansky District
- Time zone: UTC+5:00

Almash (Russian: Алмаш; Bashkir: Алмаш, Almaş) is a rural locality (a village) in Bazgiyevsky Selsoviet, Sharansky District, Bashkortostan, Russia. The population was 18 as of 2010. There are 6 streets.

== Geography ==
Almash is located 19 km southeast of Sharan (the district's administrative centre) by road. Novy Tamyan is the nearest rural locality.
