= Almaz Ivanov =

Russian diplomat

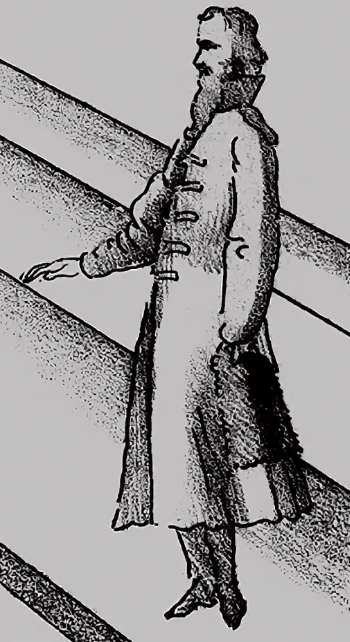

Almaz (Yerofey) Ivanovich Ivanov (Russian: Алмаз (Ерофей) Иванович Иванов, ? – April 27 (N.S. May 7), 1669) was a Russian statesman, the progenitor of the noble Almazov family.

== Career ==
From 1640 to 1646, Almaz Ivanov held the post of a dyak of the royal treasury (Казённый двор, or Kazyonniy dvor). In 1646, he was transferred to the Posolsky Prikaz (Посольский приказ, or Ministry of Foreign Affairs). Ivanov was appointed head of the Posolsky Prikaz in 1653 and remained on this post until 1667. He also managed the Pechatny Prikaz (Печатный приказ, or Stamp Office) between 1653 and 1669.

Ivanov played an important role in the government of tsar Alexey Mikhailovich Romanov. He knew several languages and was a skillful diplomat and manager. In foreign affairs, Ivanov supported Russia's struggle against Poland and the cause for integration of the Russian lands in the south and west into a unified Russian state. Ivanov went to Sweden in 1649 as a member of a diplomatic mission and visited Poland on numerous occasions. Under Ivanov's supervision, they introduced a new Customs Charter in 1653, which unified customs duties.
