= Deaths in March 2012 =

The following is a list of notable deaths in March 2012.

Entries for each day are listed alphabetically by surname. A typical entry lists information in the following sequence:

- Name, age, country of citizenship and reason for notability, established cause of death, reference (and language of reference, if not English).

== March 2012 ==
=== 1 ===
- Blagoje Adžić, 79, Serbian politician.
- Eddie Allen, 93, American football player.
- Phillip R. Allen, 72, American actor (Star Trek III: The Search for Spock, The Bad News Bears).
- Alice Arden, 97, American Olympic (1936) high jumper.
- Henryk Bałuszyński, 39, Polish footballer, heart attack.
- Luigi Bazzoni, 82, Italian film director (Pride and Vengeance, The Fifth Cord).
- Andrew Breitbart, 43, American publisher and political commentator, heart attack.
- Mushtaque Changezi, 78-79, Pakistani actor.
- Jerome Courtland, 85, American actor, director, and producer (Escape to Witch Mountain, Tokyo Joe), heart disease.
- Lucio Dalla, 68, Italian singer-songwriter ("Caruso", "4/3/1943", "Piazza Grande") and musician, heart attack.
- Jack Fouts, 86, American football player and coach.
- Peter Graeme, 90, British oboist.
- Robert Mills Grant, 85, American rancher and politician, member of the Wyoming House of Representatives (1983–1992).
- Paul Hürlimann, 78, Swiss Olympic equestrian.
- Fathulla Jameel, 69, Maldivian politician, Minister of Foreign Affairs (1978–2005), heart disease.
- 9th Jebtsundamba Khutughtu, 80, Tibetan-born Mongolian Buddhist spiritual leader.
- Archie Kalokerinos, 85, Greek-Australian physician.
- Thomas J. Lydon, 84, American federal judge, sepsis and car accident complications.
- Altamir Heitor Martins, 32, Brazilian footballer (BEC Tero Sasana F.C.).
- Gemma McCluskie, 29, British actress (EastEnders), blunt force trauma.
- Germano Mosconi, 79, Italian sportswriter and news presenter.
- Callan Pinckney, 72, American fitness professional, created Callanetics.
- Randy Primas, 62, American politician, Mayor of Camden, New Jersey (1981–1990), bone marrow cancer.
- Conrad Soares, 72, Bermudan Olympic sailor.

=== 2 ===
- Lawrence Anthony, 61, South African conservationist and environmentalist, heart attack.
- Van T. Barfoot, 92, American soldier, Medal of Honor recipient, head injuries from a fall.
- Gerry Bridgwood, 67, English footballer (Stoke City), heart attack.
- Frank Carlucci, 84, American politician.
- Nydia Ecury, 86, Aruban-Dutch writer, translator and actress, Alzheimer's disease.
- George Firestone, 80, American politician, Secretary of State of Florida (1978–1987), Alzheimer's disease.
- Doug Furnas, 52, American professional wrestler, heart disease.
- Vera Galushka-Duyunova, 66, Russian volleyball player, cardiac arrest.
- Brajamohan Jamatia, 106, Indian politician.
- Sir Keith Jones, 100, Australian medical practitioner and surgeon.
- Gary Kubly, 68, American politician, Minnesota State Senator (since 2002), amyotrophic lateral sclerosis.
- Rui Maia, 86, Portuguese Olympian
- José Adolfo Mojica Morales, 75, Salvadoran Roman Catholic prelate, Bishop of Sonsonate (1989–2011).
- John Panelli, 85, American football player (Detroit Lions, Chicago Cardinals).
- George Reynolds, 83, Australian racing driver.
- Gérard Rinaldi, 69, French actor and singer (Les Charlots), lymphoma.
- Norman St John-Stevas, 82, British politician and author, Leader of the House of Commons (1979–1981).
- Stan Stearns, 76, American photographer (John F. Kennedy Jr. salute), lung cancer.
- Frits Wijngaard, 85, Dutch Olympic boxer.
- James Q. Wilson, 80, American political scientist, co-author of the broken windows theory, leukemia.
- Isagani Yambot, 77, Filipino journalist, publisher of the Philippine Daily Inquirer (since 1994), heart attack.

=== 3 ===
- Fritz Baier, 88, German politician.
- Viv Bingham, 79, British political activist.
- Irvin Borish, 99, American optometrist.
- Steve Bridges, 48, American impressionist (George W. Bush), anaphylaxis.
- Dave Charnley, 76, British former European lightweight champion boxer.
- Leonardo Cimino, 94, American actor (Moonstruck, Dune, Hudson Hawk), COPD.
- Mike Darby, 69, Australian football player.
- A R Shamsud Doha, 83, Bangladeshi politician, Minister of Foreign Affairs (1982–1984).
- Felícia Fuster, 91, Spanish Catalan painter and poet.
- Henryk Grabowski, 82, Polish Olympic athlete.
- Anthony Grainger, 36, English police victim, shot.
- Lloyd Hittle, 88, American baseball player (Washington Senators).
- Per J. Husabø, 83, Norwegian politician.
- Lutfullah Khan, 95, Pakistani writer and sound archivist.
- Franklin McMahon, 90, American artist and reporter.
- Ralph McQuarrie, 82, American conceptual designer and illustrator (Star Wars, Cocoon, E.T. the Extra-Terrestrial), Oscar winner (1986).
- Frank Marocco, 81, American accordionist, arranger and composer.
- Ronnie Montrose, 64, American guitarist (Montrose), suicide by gunshot.
- Jim Obradovich, 62, American baseball player (Houston Astros).
- Norris Stevenson, 72, American football player (Dallas Cowboys, Edmonton Eskimos, BC Lions), cancer.
- Kason Sugioka, 98, Japanese calligrapher, Order of Culture recipient, heart failure.
- Alex Webster, 80, American football player (New York Giants, Montreal Alouettes) and coach (New York Giants).

=== 4 ===
- Ali Ahmed Abdi, 26, Somali journalist, shot.
- Maurice De Muer, 90, French cyclist and sports director.
- Christopher Joseph Earl, 86, British neurologist.
- William E. Galbraith, 86, American businessman.
- Bill Green, 50, American sprinter, cancer.
- Robert Brendon Keating, 87, American diplomat, Ambassador to Madagascar and the Comoros (1983–1986), pneumonia.
- Paul McBride, 46, British lawyer.
- Pete McCaffrey, 74, American Olympic gold medal-winning (1964) basketball player.
- Don Mincher, 73, American baseball player (Minnesota Twins, California Angels, Oakland Athletics), President of the Southern League (2000–2011).
- Runako Morton, 33, Nevisian Test cricketer (West Indies), traffic collision.
- John C. Reiss, 89, American Roman Catholic prelate, Bishop of Trenton (1980–1997).
- Shmuel Tankus, 97, Israeli naval officer, fifth commander of the Navy.
- Joan Taylor, 82, American actress (Earth vs. the Flying Saucers, The Rifleman), natural causes.

=== 5 ===
- Don Andrews, 82, Australian guitarist.
- Yehuda Ben-Haim, 56, Israeli Olympic boxer.
- Jörg Balke, 75, German Olympic athlete.
- Sobha Brahma, 82, Indian painter and sculptor.
- Willard Cochrane, 97, American agricultural economist.
- Rafael Corporán de los Santos, 71, Dominican television producer, host, and politician, Mayor of Distrito Nacional (1990–1994), heart attack.
- Fernando Da Silva, 91, American painter.
- Paul Haines, 41, New Zealand writer, cancer.
- Zahir Howaida, 67, Afghan singer.
- William Heirens, 83, American serial killer.
- Rushworth Kidder, 67, American ethicist and writer, natural causes.
- Godwin Kotey, 46–47, Ghanaian actor, producer, educator, playwright and director, leukemia.
- Marian Kuszewski, 78, Polish Olympic silver medal-winning (1956, 1960) fencer.
- Roland Lakes, 72, American football player (San Francisco 49ers, New York Giants).
- Philip Madoc, 77, Welsh actor (Dad's Army, The Life and Times of David Lloyd George).
- Maurice Pechet, 94, American academic.
- Ken Shipp, 83, American football coach.
- William O. Wooldridge, 89, American army officer.

=== 6 ===
- Marcos Alonso, 78, Spanish football player (Real Madrid).
- Francisco Xavier do Amaral, 75, East Timorese politician, President (1975).
- Jaap Boersma, 82, Dutch politician, Minister of Social Affairs (1971–1977), Minister of Agriculture and Fisheries (1973).
- Jan Dawidziuk, 74, Polish-born American bishop of the Polish National Catholic Church.
- Antonio Garzya, 85, Italian professor.
- Lucia Mannucci, 91, Italian singer.
- Louis J. Michot, 89, American politician.
- Maurice Moyer, 93, American clergyman and civil rights leader.
- Suwa Nejiko, 92, Japanese violinist.
- Donald M. Payne, 77, American politician, U.S. Representative from New Jersey (since 1989), colon cancer.
- Frederick M. Reed, 87, American politician, Attorney General of Vermont (1957–1960).
- Robert B. Sherman, 86, American songwriter and composer (Mary Poppins, The Many Adventures of Winnie the Pooh, Chitty Chitty Bang Bang), Oscar winner (1965).
- Arthur A. Vogel, 88, American bishop of the Episcopal Diocese of West Missouri.
- Helen Walulik, 82, American baseball player (All-American Girls Professional Baseball League).
- Sayuri Yamauchi, 55, Japanese voice actress (Mobile Suit Gundam Wing, Crayon Shin-chan), cancer.

=== 7 ===
- Jeanne Achterberg, 69, American psychologist, breast cancer.
- Cris Alexander, 92, American actor and photographer.
- Gary DeCramer, 67, American politician, Minnesota state senator (1983–1993).
- Tony Drake, 89, English hiker.
- Harold K. Forsen, 79, American nuclear engineer.
- Gherardo Gnoli, 74, Italian historian.
- Dave Hrechkosy, 60, Canadian ice hockey player (California Golden Seals, St. Louis Blues), brain cancer.
- Sir Raymond Lygo, 87, British admiral and businessman.
- Félicien Marceau, 98, French novelist, member of the Académie française.
- Marcel Mouchel, 85, French footballer and manager.
- Greg Novak, 61, American writer and wargame designer.
- Big Walter Price, 97, American blues singer, songwriter and pianist.
- Włodzimierz Smolarek, 54, Polish footballer.
- Pierre Tornade, 82, French actor.
- Ramaz Urushadze, 72, Georgian footballer.
- Aníbal Villacís, 85, Ecuadorian painter.

=== 8 ===
- Corinna Adam, 75, British journalist, home fire.
- Kristin Bølgen Bronebakk, 61, Norwegian civil servant.
- LaVerne Carter, 86, American bowler, heart failure.
- S. Henry Cho, 77, Korean martial arts instructor.
- Pat Claridge, 73, Canadian football player, Alzheimer's disease.
- Leslie Cochran, 60, American street personality, activist, and politician, head trauma.
- Simin Daneshvar, 90, Iranian academic, novelist, fiction writer and translator.
- Ursula Dronke, 91, British medievalist.
- Mike Fetchick, 89, American golfer.
- Compton Gonsalves, 85, Trinidad and Tobago Olympic cyclist.
- Bugs Henderson, 68, American blues guitarist, cancer.
- Charlie Hoag, 81, American Olympic gold medal-winning basketball player (1952).
- Scott Huey, 88, Northern Irish cricketer.
- Elena Libera, 94, Italian Olympic (1948) fencer.
- Minoru Mori, 77, Japanese businessperson, chairman and executive director of the Mori Building Company, founder of the Mori Art Museum, heart failure.
- Elio Pagliarani, 84, Italian poet and literary critic.
- Jens Petersen, 70, Danish footballer and manager.
- Steven Rubenstein, 49, American anthropologist.
- Mick Walker, 69, British motorcycling writer.

=== 9 ===
- Peter Bergman, 72, American comedian (The Firesign Theater), leukemia.
- Dennis Bowen, 61, American actor (Caddyshack II; Welcome Back, Kotter).
- Brian Bromley, 65, English footballer (Bolton Wanderers, Portsmouth).
- Herb Carnegie, 92, Canadian ice hockey player.
- Anton Crișan, 70, Romanian ice hockey player.
- Harry Dagnall, 97, British philatelist.
- Willye Dennis, 85, American civil rights activist and politician, member of the Florida House of Representatives (1992–1999).
- John Holt, 82, Australian politician, member of the New South Wales Legislative Council (1972–1984).
- Thomas Locker, 74, American author and painter.
- Fotis Mavriplis, 92, Greek Olympic skier.
- Joy Mukherjee, 73, Indian actor.
- Zuhir al-Qaisi, 49, Palestinian militant leader, Secretary General of the Popular Resistance Committees (since 2011), air strike.
- Selma Rubin, 96, American activist and environmentalist.
- Jose Tomas Sanchez, 91, Filipino Roman Catholic prelate, Cardinal Priest of San Pio V a Villa Carpegna (1991–2012).
- Terry Teene, 70, American singer and clown, injuries from a traffic collision.
- Bill Wedderburn, Baron Wedderburn of Charlton, 84, British academic and politician.
- Harry Wendelstedt, 73, American baseball umpire (1966–1998), brain tumor.
- Widjojo Nitisastro, 84, Indonesian economist and government minister.

=== 10 ===
- Sukumar Barman, 60, Indian politician.
- George Beattie, 86, Scottish footballer.
- Bert R. Bulkin, 82, American aeronautical engineer.
- Dorrit Cohn, 87, American academic.
- Milton Copolillo, 78, Brazilian footballer.
- Wim De Smet, 79, Flemish zoologist.
- Amina El Filali, 16, Moroccan rape victim, suicide by poisoning.
- Elmer L. Gaden, 88, American biochemist.
- Jean Giraud, 73, French comic book artist (Blueberry, Métal Hurlant) and film production designer (Tron, Alien), cancer.
- Julio César González, 35, Mexican Olympic boxer and former world light heavyweight champion, injuries from a hit and run.
- Robert A. Howie, 88, English petrologist.
- Jay McMullen, 90, American journalist (CBS News).
- Hermín Negrón Santana, 74, Puerto Rican Roman Catholic prelate, Auxiliary Bishop of San Juan de Puerto Rico (since 1981).
- R. I. Page, 87, British historian and runologist.
- Mykola Plaviuk, 86, Ukrainian politician, last President of the Ukrainian People's Republic in exile (1989–1992).
- Uttamrao Deorao Patil, 67, Indian politician.
- Frank Sherwood Rowland, 84, American chemistry professor, Nobel laureate in Chemistry (1995), Parkinson's disease.
- Domna Samiou, 83, Greek singer and traditional music researcher.
- Tony Silipo, 54, Canadian politician, Ontario Minister of Education (1991–1993) and MPP for Dovercourt (1990–1999), brain tumor.
- Jammu Siltavuori, 85, Finnish murderer and sex offender.
- Ruth-Marie Stewart, 84, American Olympic skier.
- John G. Taylor, 80, British physicist.
- Tan Boon Teik, 83, Singaporean lawyer, Attorney-General (1967–1992), internal bleeding.
- Jack Watson, 90, English cricketer, football coach and scout.
- Richard White, 86, New Zealand rugby union player.
- Ethel Winter, 87, American dancer with the Martha Graham Dance Company and teacher at the Juilliard School.
- Nick Zoricic, 29, Canadian ski cross racer, brain injuries from race crash.

=== 11 ===
- Henry Adefope, 85, Nigerian politician, Foreign Minister (1978–1979).
- Hub Andrews, 89, American baseball player (New York Giants).
- Gian Nicola Babini, 67, Italian scientist.
- Faith Brook, 90, British actress.
- Sid Couchey, 92, American comic book artist (Richie Rich, Little Lotta, Little Dot), Burkitt's lymphoma.
- Alba Encarnación, 56, Puerto Rican activist and teacher.
- Wayne Frazier, 73, American football player (Kansas City Chiefs).
- Hans G. Helms, 79, German experimental writer.
- Philip Jenkinson, 76, English television presenter.
- María Teresa López Beltrán, 61, Spanish medievalist and academic (University of Málaga).
- Tom Manastersky, 83, Canadian football player (Montreal Alouettes, Saskatchewan Roughriders) and hockey player (Montreal Canadiens).
- Bogusław Mec, 65, Polish singer, songwriter, composer, and artist.
- James B. Morehead, 95, American World War II flying ace, stroke complications.
- Noverre, 14, American Thoroughbred racehorse, winner of the Sussex Stakes (2001). (death announced on this date)
- Lanier W. Phillips, 88, American civil rights activist.
- Gösta Schwarck, 96, Danish composer and businessman.
- John Souza, 91, American soccer player (1950 World Cup, 1948 and 1952 Olympics).
- Leon Spencer, 66, American jazz organist.
- Ghiath Tayfour, 42-43, Syrian boxing champion, shot.
- Ian Turpie, 68, Australian actor and game show host, throat cancer.
- Miomir Vukobratović, 81, Serbian mechanical engineer.
- Tahira Wasti, 68, Pakistani actor.

=== 12 ===
- Mark Aguhar, 24, American activist, writer and multimedia fine artist, suicide.
- Niels Baunsøe, 72, Danish Olympic cyclist.
- Robert Parke Cameron, 91, Canadian diplomat.
- Samuel Glazer, 89, American entrepreneur and businessman, co-developer of Mr. Coffee, leukemia.
- Junus Effendi Habibie, 74, Indonesian diplomat.
- Dick Harter, 81, American basketball coach (Charlotte Hornets, University of Oregon), cancer.
- Michael Hossack, 65, American drummer (The Doobie Brothers), cancer.
- Friedhelm Konietzka, 73, German-born Swiss football player and manager, assisted suicide.
- Erling Stuer Lauridsen, 95, Danish Olympic wrestler.
- Augustin Misago, 69, Rwandan Roman Catholic prelate, Bishop of Gikongoro (since 1992).
- Wilson Abraham Moncayo Jalil, 67, Ecuadorian Roman Catholic prelate, Bishop of Santo Domingo en Ecuador (since 2002).
- Tom Murrin, 73, American performance artist and playwright.
- Madeleine Parent, 93, Canadian union leader and women's rights activist.
- Jean-Pierre Salignon, 84, French Olympic basketball player.
- Douglas Scott, 91, Australian politician, member of the Australian Senate (1970, 1974–1985).

=== 13 ===
- Vernon Ahmadjian, 81, American lichenologist.
- Abdullah al-Dahdouh, 45–46, Moroccan Muslim, murdered.
- Keith Bannister, 89, English footballer.
- Michael P. Barnett, 82, British theoretical chemist and computer scientist.
- Bengt Beckman, 86, Swedish mathematician.
- Derek Bridge, 90, English cricketer.
- Harvey T. Carter, 83, American rock climber.
- Domitila Chúngara, 74, Bolivian labor leader and feminist, lung cancer.
- Bodjie Dasig, 48, Filipino singer and songwriter, cancer.
- Della Davidson, 60, American modern dancer, choreographer, and dance professor, breast cancer.
- Julius Depaoli, 88, Austrian Olympic water polo player.
- Michel Duchaussoy, 73, French actor, cardiac arrest.
- Jock Hobbs, 52, New Zealand rugby union player and administrator, leukaemia.
- Frank Jordan, 79, Australian Olympic (1952) water polo player.
- Tom Johnson, 89, American astronomer and businessman, founder of Celestron.
- Noel Luces, 63, Trinidadian Olympic (1968) cyclist, stroke.
- Hans Ludvig Martensen, 84, Danish Roman Catholic prelate, Bishop of Copenhagen (1965–1995).
- Eileen McDonough, 49, American child actress (The Mary Tyler Moore Show, The Waltons).
- Grete Nordrå, 87, Norwegian actress.
- Karl Roy, 43, Filipino singer (Kapatid, P.O.T.), cardiac arrest.
- Lyudmila Shagalova, 88, Russian film actress (The Young Guard, Balzaminov's Marriage).
- Cedric Sharpley, 59, South African drummer (Gary Numan, Druid, Dramatis), cardiac arrest.
- Amusa Shittu, 75, Nigerian footballer, effects of a stroke.
- Jacques Villiers, 87, French aerospace engineer.

=== 14 ===
- Gretl Aicher, 84, Austrian artistic director.
- Liesbeth Baarveld-Schlaman, 77, Dutch politician.
- Ray Barlow, 85, English footballer (West Bromwich Albion).
- Vladimir Buslaev, 74, Russian mathematical physicist.
- Valentīna Butāne, 82, Latvian singer.
- Matthew G. Carter, 98, American politician and housing activist, Mayor of Montclair, New Jersey (1968–1972), Alzheimer's disease.
- Kihachi Enomoto, 75, Japanese baseball player, colon cancer.
- Himanish Goswami, 85, Indian writer and cartoonist, prostate cancer.
- Ernst-Günter Habig, 76, German Olympic footballer, stroke.
- Eddie King, 73, American Chicago blues musician.
- Carl Rattray, 82, Jamaican jurist and politician, Attorney General (1989–1993) and president of the Court of Appeal (1993–1999).
- Marcel Rohrbach, 78, French cyclist.
- Pierre Schoendoerffer, 83, French director (The Anderson Platoon), surgical complications.
- Margareta Sjöstedt, 88, Swedish-born Austrian singer and actress.
- Ted L. Strickland, 79, American politician, Lieutenant Governor of Colorado (1973–1975).
- Ċensu Tabone, 98, Maltese politician, President (1989–1994) and Minister for Foreign Affairs (1987–1989).

=== 15 ===
- Alice Amsden, 68, American economist and MIT professor.
- Edvard Hagerup Bull, 89, Norwegian composer.
- Mervyn Davies, 65, Welsh rugby union player, cancer.
- Bob Day, 67, American Olympic (1968) distance runner, bladder cancer.
- Baby Falak, 2, Indian baby, cardiac arrest.
- Eb Gaines, 84, American businessman and diplomat, Consul General to Bermuda (1989–1992).
- Lily Garafulic, 97, Chilean sculptor and professor.
- Luis Gonzales, 81, Filipino actor, pneumonia.
- Bernardino González Ruiz, 101, Panamanian politician, president (1963).
- Fran Matera, 87, American comic strip artist (Steve Roper and Mike Nomad).
- Nigel Napier, 14th Lord Napier, 81, British soldier and courtier.
- Dave Philley, 91, American baseball player (Baltimore Orioles, Chicago White Sox, Philadelphia Athletics).
- Pepe Rubio, 80, Spanish actor.
- Jean-Marie Souriau, 89, French mathematician.
- Joe Stanley, 104, American World War II pilot, commander of Eglin Air Force Base.

=== 16 ===
- Aziz Ab'Sáber, 87, Brazilian geologist, heart attack.
- Georges Aber, 81, French singer-songwriter.
- Alexander of Liechtenstein, 82, Liechtenstein royal.
- Lee Balterman, 91, American photographer.
- M. A. R. Barker, 83, American professor, fantasy novelist, and role-playing game creator.
- Estanislau Basora, 85, Spanish footballer.
- John Billman, 92, American football player (Minnesota Gophers, Brooklyn Dodgers, Chicago Rockets).
- Bijan Choudhury, 80–81, Indian painter.
- Giancarlo Cobelli, 82, Italian actor and stage director.
- Ed Dahler, 86, American basketball player.
- Ray Gariepy, 83, Canadian ice hockey player (Boston Bruins, Toronto Maple Leafs).
- John Ghindia, 86, American football player (University of Michigan).
- Robert Hails, 89, American air force lieutenant general, vice commander of Tactical Air Command.
- Robert L. Hall, 85, American anthropologist, authority on Native American culture, complications from carcinoid cancer.
- Donald E. Hillman, 93, American World War II flying ace.
- Irvin Iffla, 88, Jamaican cricketer.
- Eldon Nelson, 85, American jockey.
- Bronislav Poloczek, 72, Czech theatre and television actor.
- Peter Serracino Inglott, 75, Maltese philosopher.
- Anita Steckel, 82, American feminist artist.
- Takaaki Yoshimoto, 87, Japanese poet, critic, and professor (Tokyo Institute of Technology), pneumonia.
- Dieter Zechlin, 85, German pianist.

=== 17 ===
- Patience Abbe, 87, American children's author.
- Paul Boyer, 76, American historian.
- Rubí Cerioni, 84, Argentine footballer.
- Bernard Cohen, 87, American nuclear physicist.
- Matt Conte, 85, American football player and coach.
- John Cowles Jr., 82, American businessman and philanthropist, lung cancer.
- Bert Demarco, 87, Scottish snooker player and billiard hall owner, stroke.
- John Demjanjuk, 91, Ukrainian Nazi war criminal, natural causes.
- René Fontaine, 78, Canadian politician, Minister of Northern Development (1987–1990).
- John T. Henley, 90, American politician, President pro tempore of the North Carolina Senate (1975–1978).
- Famara Jatta, 53, Gambian government minister and economist, Governor of the Central Bank (2003–2007).
- Jaye Radisich, 35, Australian politician, Western Australian MLA for Swan Hills (2001–2008), cancer.
- Pope Shenouda III of Alexandria, 88, Egyptian Pope of the Coptic Orthodox Church of Alexandria (since 1971), prostate cancer.
- Ron Stewart, 79, Canadian ice hockey player.
- Ngaire Thomas, 69, New Zealand author.
- Margaret Whitlam, 92, Australian swimmer and activist, wife of Gough Whitlam, complications from a fall.
- Chaleo Yoovidhya, 88, Thai businessman (Red Bull), natural causes.
- Fakhra Younus, 33, Pakistani acid attack victim, suicide by jumping.

=== 18 ===
- Imra Agotić, 69, Croatian major general, commander of the Air Force.
- Khelifi Ahmed, 90–91, Algerian singer.
- Haim Alexander, 96, German-born Israeli composer.
- Furman Bisher, 93, American sports writer (The Atlanta Journal-Constitution), heart attack.
- William R. Charette, 79, American Medal of Honor recipient.
- Shirley May France, 79, American swimmer.
- António Leitão, 51, Portuguese Olympic bronze medal-winning (1984) athlete, iron overload.
- Bob McConnell, 87, American baseball author and researcher, founding member of Society for American Baseball Research.
- William G. Moore Jr., 91, American Air Force general.
- Alan Pegler, 91, British railway preservationist.
- Claudia Pía Baudracco, 41, Argentine women, sexual minorities and LGTBI rights activist.
- Anargyros Printezis, 74, Greek Eastern Catholic hierarch, Apostolic Exarch of Greece (1975–2008).
- Nigel Rusted, 104, Canadian physician.
- István Suti, 72, Hungarian Olympic equestrian.
- George Tupou V, 63, Tongan King (since 2006).
- Eric Watson, 56, British photographer, heart attack.
- Jalal Zolfonun, 74, Iranian setar player and composer, heart disease.

=== 19 ===
- Verica Barać, 56, Serbian lawyer, cancer.
- Dante Benvenuti, 86, Argentine Olympic cyclist.
- Hanne Borchsenius, 76, Danish actress.
- Jim Case, 84, American television director and producer.
- Jagbir Singh Chhina, 92, Indian freedom fighter.
- Masum Ahmed Chowdhury, 68-69, Bangladeshi diplomat, lung cancer.
- Gene DeWeese, 78, American author.
- Donald Brown Engley, 94, American librarian.
- Ulu Grosbard, 83, Belgian-born American theatre and film director (The Subject Was Roses, American Buffalo).
- William J. Hibbler, 65, American federal judge, District Judge for the United States District Court for the Northern District of Illinois (since 1999).
- Anton Jude, 51, Sri Lankan actor, cardiac arrest.
- Sanford N. McDonnell, 89, American businessman (McDonnell Douglas), pancreatic cancer.
- Paul Peter Mostoway, 81, Canadian politician.
- Hugo Munthe-Kaas, 90, Norwegian resistance fighter and politician.
- Karl-Heinz Spickenagel, 80, German footballer.
- George Topolnisky, 95, Canadian politician.
- Knut Erik Tranøy, 93, Norwegian philosopher.

=== 20 ===
- Erlom Akhvlediani, 78, Georgian writer.
- Guy Boucher, 68, French Canadian actor, singer and radio and TV presenter.
- Daishin Noboru, 74, Japanese sumo wrestler.
- Ottorino Enzo, 85, Italian rower.
- Bill Glasson, 87, Australian politician, member of the Queensland Legislative Assembly for Gregory (1974–1989).
- Lincoln Hall, 56, Australian mountaineer and author, mesothelioma.
- Ralph P. Hummel, 74, American political scientist.
- Noboru Ishiguro, 73, Japanese animator and animation director (Space Battleship Yamato, The Super Dimension Fortress Macross, Megazone 23).
- Ante Jurić, 89, Croatian Roman Catholic prelate, Metropolitan Archbishop of Split and Makarska (1988–2000).
- Abdul Rahman Orfalli, 23, Syrian protest organizer, bombing.
- Mel Parnell, 89, American baseball player (Boston Red Sox), cancer.
- Frits de Ruijter, 94, Dutch Olympic athlete.
- Chaim Pinchas Scheinberg, 101, Polish-born Israeli Haredi rabbi and rosh yeshiva.
- Jim Stynes, 45, Irish-born Australian football player, cancer.
- Allan Tolmich, 93, American athlete, Amateur Athletic Union hurdle champion (1937, 1939, 1940, 1941).
- Bernard Zadi Zaourou, 73, Ivorian politician and author, heart complications.

=== 21 ===
- Shaima Alawadi, 32, American murder victim, head trauma.
- Lacy Banks, 68, American sports columnist (Chicago Sun-Times) and author, heart disease.
- Rekia Boyd, 22, American police victim, shot.
- Christine Brooke-Rose, 89, British writer and literary critic.
- John George Chedid, 88, Lebanese-born American Maronite hierarch, first Bishop of Our Lady of Los Angeles (1994–2000).
- Albrecht Dietz, 86, German entrepreneur and scientist.
- Judy Egerton, 83, Australian-born British art historian and curator.
- Ron Erhardt, 81, American football coach (New England Patriots, New York Giants, New York Jets).
- Elisabeth Ettlinger, 96, German-born Swiss archaeologist and academic.
- Robert Fuest, 84, English film director.
- Bruno Giacometti, 104, Swiss architect, brother of Alberto and Diego Giacometti.
- Tonino Guerra, 92, Italian poet and screenwriter (L'Avventura, Blowup, Amarcord).
- Irving Louis Horowitz, 82, American sociologist (Rutgers University, Washington University), surgical complications.
- Mohamed Kassas, 91, Egyptian botanist and environmentalist.
- Murray Lender, 81, American entrepreneur (Lender's Bagels), complications from a fall.
- Yuri Razuvaev, 66, Russian chess player and trainer.
- Matanhy Saldanha, 63, Indian politician and social activist, heart attack.
- Marina Salye, 77, Russian geologist and politician, heart attack.
- Shao Xianghua, 99, Chinese scientist.
- Derick Thomson, 90, Scottish poet.
- Kåre Tveter, 90, Norwegian painter and illustrator.

=== 22 ===
- Joe Blanchard, 83, American football player (Edmonton Eskimos), professional wrestler and promoter, squamous-cell carcinoma.
- C. K. Chandrappan, 76, Indian politician, Secretary of the Communist Party of India (Kerala), member of the Lok Sabha (1977–1980; 2004–2010), cancer.
- Remmie Colaço, 86, Indian singer, Alzheimer's disease.
- Samuel Collins, 88, American politician.
- Ted Cutting, 85, British automotive engineer, designed Aston Martin DBR1.
- Dhaval Dhairyawan, 32, Indian photographer, after a long illness.
- Hernán Elizondo Arce, 90, Costa Rican novelist and poet.
- Demir Gökgöl, 74, Turkish-born German actor.
- Harry Gunnarsson, 82, Swedish Olympic boxer.
- Johnny McCauley, 86, Irish singer-songwriter.
- Vimal Mundada, 49, Indian politician, cancer.
- Nagnath Naikwadi, 89, Indian independence activist and social worker.
- Jackson Narcomey, 70, American painter.
- Muhammad Ibrahim Nugud, 80, Sudanese politician, Secretary General of the Sudanese Communist Party (since 1971).
- Kirsten Passer, 82, Danish actress.
- John Payton, 65, American civil rights attorney (Gratz v. Bollinger).
- Matthew White Ridley, 4th Viscount Ridley, 86, British nobleman.
- Edward Sismore, 90, British RAF officer (Air Commodore) and Distinguished Flying Cross recipient.
- Mickey Sullivan, 80, American baseball coach.
- David Waltz, 68, American computer scientist.
- Neil L. Whitehead, 56, English anthropologist.

=== 23 ===
- Abdullahi Yusuf Ahmed, 77, Somali politician, President (2004–2008), liver failure.
- Chico Anysio, 80, Brazilian comedian, renal and pulmonary failure.
- Jean-Yves Besselat, 68, French politician.
- Harold Blitman, 82, American basketball coach.
- Jim Duffy, 75, American animator (Rugrats, The Smurfs, G.I. Joe: A Real American Hero), cancer.
- Jack Ellena, 80, American football player.
- Hynek Hromada, 76, Czech sports shooter.
- Witold Lesiewicz, 89, Polish film director.
- Eric Lowen, 60, American singer and songwriter ("We Belong", "Everything I Wanted"), complications from ALS.
- Péter Pázmándy, 73, Hungarian-born Swiss footballer and coach.
- Naji Talib, 94, Iraqi politician, prime minister (1966–1967).
- Lonnie Wright, 68, American football (Denver Broncos) and basketball (Denver Rockets) player, heart failure.

=== 24 ===
- Iqbal Bahu, 68, Pakistani singer, cardiac arrest.
- Dennis Bennett, 72, American baseball player (Philadelphia Phillies, Boston Red Sox).
- Vigor Bovolenta, 37, Italian Olympic silver medal-winning (1996) volleyball player, heart attack.
- Sir Paul Callaghan, 64, New Zealand physicist, colon cancer.
- Henry Clark, 82, Northern Irish politician, MP for Antrim, North (1959–1970).
- Bill Cutler, 92, American baseball executive.
- Hertha Engelbrecht, 89, German lawyer.
- Pierre Gérald, 105, French actor.
- Vince Lovegrove, 65, Australian musician and journalist, car accident.
- Marion Marlowe, 83, American singer and stage actress, natural causes.
- Edward Henryk Materski, 89, Polish Roman Catholic prelate, Bishop of Radom (1992–1999).
- Nick Noble, 85, American pop and country singer ("The Tip of My Fingers", "Moonlight Swim").
- Jose Prakash, 86, Indian actor, heart failure.
- Wolfgang Rennert, 89, German conductor.
- Jocky Wilson, 62, Scottish darts player.

=== 25 ===
- Raymond Bley, 73, Luxembourgish Olympic cyclist.
- Priscilla Buckley, 90, American writer, managing editor of National Review.
- Hal E. Chester, 91, American film producer and former child actor.
- John Crosfield, 96, British businessman.
- Bob DeCourcy, 84, Canadian ice hockey player (New York Rangers).
- Marie Elwood, 80, Canadian museum curator and historian.
- Tony Gordon, 63, New Zealand rugby league player and coach.
- Edd Gould, 23, British animator (Eddsworld), leukemia.
- Russell C. Jordan Jr., 85, American politician.
- Mona Shourie Kapoor, 48, Indian television producer, cancer.
- Ben-Zion Leitner, 85, Israeli soldier, Medal of Valor recipient.
- Lex, 12, American Marine service dog, awarded honorary Purple Heart, cancer.
- Tom Lodge, 75, British radio DJ, cancer.
- Ralph Maxwell, 78, New Zealand politician, MP for Waitakere (1978–1984) and Titirangi (1984–1990).
- Roger Molander, 71, American anti-nuclear activist, complications from liver cancer.
- Tony Newton, Baron Newton of Braintree, 74, British politician, Leader of the House of Commons (1992–1997), MP for Braintree (1974–1997).
- Nathalie Perrey, 83, French actress.
- Larry Stevenson, 81, American skateboard innovator, pneumonia and Alzheimer's disease.
- Bertil Ströberg, 79, Swedish Air Force officer and spy, cancer.
- Bert Sugar, 74, American boxing writer and historian, cardiac arrest.
- Antonio Tabucchi, 68, Italian novelist (Indian Nocturne, Pereira Maintains).
- Bill Weston, 70, British stuntman (Saving Private Ryan, Raiders of the Lost Ark, Titanic).

=== 26 ===
- Susana Agüero, 68, Argentine ballet dancer.
- Sisto Averno, 86, American football player (Baltimore Colts).
- Michael Begley, 79, Irish politician, TD for Kerry South (1969–1989).
- Thomas M. Cover, 73, American information theorist.
- David Craighead, 88, American organist.
- Manik Sitaram Godghate, 74, Indian poet.
- Jay Holt, 88, American Olympic wrestler.
- Edmond Jacobs, 83, Luxembourgish cyclist.
- Helmer Ringgren, 94, Swedish theologian.
- Stella Tanner, 87, British actress.

=== 27 ===
- Dale Baker, 73, Australian politician, South Australian MHA for MacKillop (1985–1997); Leader of the Opposition (1990–1992), motor neurone disease.
- Sohen Biln, 72, Canadian Olympic rower.
- Hugo Biermann, 95, South African admiral.
- Roger Cooke, 71, American artist and muralist.
- Millôr Fernandes, 87, Brazilian cartoonist, humorist, and playwright, multiple organ failure.
- Ademilde Fonseca, 91, Brazilian Choro singer.
- Marc Gervais, 82, Canadian Jesuit, writer, and film professor, complications of dementia.
- Larry Haws, 72, American politician, member of the Minnesota House of Representatives (2006–2010), brain cancer.
- Harold G. Hillam, 77, American leader in the Church of Jesus Christ of Latter-day Saints.
- Anatoly Kikin, 71, Soviet and Russian footballer and coach.
- Hilton Kramer, 84, American art critic, co-founder of The New Criterion.
- Adrienne Rich, 82, American feminist poet and essayist, complications of rheumatoid arthritis.
- Warren Stevens, 92, American actor (Forbidden Planet, The Barefoot Contessa, Return to Peyton Place), lung disease.
- Micah True, 58, American ultramarathon runner.
- Garry Walberg, 90, American actor (Quincy, M.E., The Odd Couple, Peyton Place), COPD and heart failure.
- Daniel Zamudio, 24, Chilean homosexual, beaten.
- Alim Zankishiev, 30, Russian insurgent, leader in the Caucasus Emirate, killed.

=== 28 ===
- Fred Anderson, 78, Australian rugby league player.
- John Arden, 81, English playwright.
- Alexander Arutiunian, 91, Armenian composer.
- Etel Billig, 79, American actress, brain aneurysm.
- Leonard Braithwaite, 88, Canadian lawyer and politician.
- Walker Calhoun, 93, Cherokee musician, dancer, and teacher.
- Jacques Carelman, 83, French painter, illustrator and designer.
- Bernard Combo-Matsiona, 72, Congolese politician.
- Harry Crews, 76, American author, neuropathy.
- T. Damodaran, 77, Indian screenwriter.
- Ruth M. Davis, 83, American computer scientist and civil servant.
- Hans van den Doel, 74, Dutch economist and politician, Member of the House of Representatives (1967–1973).
- Joy G. Dryfoos, 86, American sociologist, cardiac arrest.
- Alberto María Fonrouge, 99, Argentine politician and lawyer.
- Jerry McCain, 81, American blues musician.
- Willie May, 75, American Olympic hurdle medalist (1960), amyloidosis.
- Erkki Nordberg, 65, Finnish colonel and war correspondent.
- Brian Phillips, 80, English footballer (Mansfield Town).
- William Sampson, 52, Canadian author, heart attack.
- Earl Scruggs, 88, American bluegrass musician, natural causes.
- Sergei Solnechnikov, 31, Russian military officer, grenade explosion.
- Eduard Steinberg, 76, Russian painter, cancer.
- Neil Travis, 75, American film editor (Dances with Wolves, Stepmom, Terminator 3: Rise of the Machines), Oscar winner (1991).
- Addie L. Wyatt, 88, American labor and civil rights leader, long illness.

=== 29 ===
- Mortimer H. Appley, 90, American psychologist and academic administrator.
- P. S. Appu, 83, Indian civil servant.
- Luke Askew, 80, American actor (Cool Hand Luke, Easy Rider, The Green Berets).
- Ioannis Banias, 72, Greek politician.
- Borgia, 18, German racehorse, euthanized.
- Jonathan Bowden, 49, British politician.
- Bill Brett, Baron Brett, 70, British trade unionist and politician.
- Liv Buck, 83, Norwegian trade unionist.
- Olimpia Cavalli, 81, Italian actress (Vanina Vanini, The Thursday, His Women).
- John S. Chase, 87, American architect.
- Pap Cheyassin Secka, 69, Gambian politician.
- Paulino Reale Chirina, 88, Argentine Roman Catholic prelate, Bishop of Venado Tuerto (1989–2000).
- Lam Cho, 102, Chinese martial artist.
- Gerald Estrin, 90, American computer science pioneer.
- Albert Hadley, 91, American interior decorator, cancer.
- Bill Jenkins, 81, American NHRA drag racer.
- Hone Kaa, 71, New Zealand church leader, cancer.
- Kenneth Libo, 74, American historian of Jewish immigration.
- Oksana Makar, 18, Ukrainian rape and murder victim.
- John Mallison, 82, Australian pastor.
- Douglas L. Mills, 71, American physicist and writer.
- Montjeu, 16, Irish racehorse, sepsis.
- Ray Narleski, 83, American baseball player (Cleveland Indians), natural causes.
- Joel Olson, 45, American political science professor.
- Michael Peterson, 59, Australian surfer, heart attack.
- Frank H. Strickler, 92, American defense lawyer.
- David Walter, 64, British journalist, cancer.

=== 30 ===
- Janet Anderson Perkin, 90, Canadian baseball player and curler.
- Raja Ashman Shah, 53, Malaysian royal, son of the Sultan of Perak, asthma attack.
- Rex Babin, 49, American cartoonist (The Sacramento Bee), cancer.
- Robert Beezer, 83, American federal judge, lung cancer.
- Jorge Carpizo McGregor, 67, Mexican jurist, complications from surgery.
- James Chowning Davies, 93, American sociologist.
- Ron Gaunt, 78, Australian cricketer.
- Kees Guyt, 58, Dutch footballer (AZ'67).
- Aquila Berlas Kiani, 90–91, Indian academic.
- Barry Kitchener, 64, English footballer (Millwall), cancer.
- Viktor Kosichkin, 74, Russian Olympic speed skating gold and silver medalist (1960).
- Francesco Mancini, 43, Italian footballer (Foggia), heart attack.
- Addie Morrow, 83, Northern Irish politician.
- Emrys Roberts, 82, Welsh poet and author, Archdruid of Wales (1987–1990).
- Granville Semmes, 84, American entrepreneur, founder of 1-800-Flowers.
- Leonid Shebarshin, 77, Russian KGB interim Chairman (1991), suicide by gunshot.
- Tenga Rinpoche, 80, Tibetan lama.
- Ioannis Vasileiadis, 88, Greek politician and admiral, Minister of Public Order (1990–1991).
- Erich Wenk, 86, German bass-baritone.

=== 31 ===
- Judith Adams, 68, New Zealand-born Australian politician, Senator for Western Australia (since 2005), breast cancer.
- Beatrice Brumby, 98, Australian pastoral and tourism pioneer.
- G. Emerson Cole, 93, American radio broadcaster.
- Dale R. Corson, 97, American physicist, President of Cornell University (1969–1977), heart failure.
- Cosmas Desmond, 76, South African priest and activist.
- Grand Slam, 17, American thoroughbred racehorse, winner of the 1997 Belmont Futurity Stakes and Champagne Stakes, heart failure.
- Bernard Gruenke, 99, American stained glass artist.
- Lise London, 96, French resistance fighter, widow of Artur London.
- Jerry Lynch, 81, American baseball player (Pittsburgh Pirates, Cincinnati Reds), prostate cancer.
- Galina Savenko, 46, Russian Olympic sprint canoer.
- Alberto Sughi, 83, Italian painter.
- Halbert White, 61, American economist, cancer.
