= Mavriplis =

Mavriplis is a Greek surname. Notable people with the surname include:

- Catherine Mavriplis, Canadian professor of mechanical and aerospace engineering, daughter of Fotis
- Fotis Mavriplis (1920–2012), Greek Olympic skier and later Canadian aerospace engineer, father of Catherine
