= Strickler =

Strickler is a surname. Notable people with the surname include:

- Albert Strickler (1887–1963), co-author of the Gauckler–Manning–Strickler formula
- Amelia Strickler (born 1994), British shot putter
- Bub Strickler (1938-2005), former NASCAR Cup Series driver
- Cyrus W. Strickler (1872–1953), American physician and educator
- Daniel B. Strickler (1897–1992), American politician from Pennsylvania; lieutenant governor 1947–51
- Dave Strickler (born 1944), American reference librarian
- Dave Strickler (drag racer), American drag racer
- Frank H. Strickler (1920–2012), American defense lawyer
- George Strickler (1904–1976), American sports writer
- Jacob Strickler (1770–1842), American artist
- Kemp Strickler, American politician
- Kristo Strickler (born 1998), American soccer player
- Kyle Strickler (born 1983), American NASCAR driver
- Matt Strickler, American politician
- René Strickler (born 1962), Argentine-Mexican actor
- Susan Strickler, American television and theater director
- Will Strickler (born 1986), American professional golfer
- Yancey Strickler (born 1978), American entrepreneur, Kickstarter co-founder

== See also ==
- Strickler, Arkansas, an unincorporated community, United States
- Strickler, Pennsylvania, an unincorporated community, United States
- Stricklerstown, Pennsylvania, an unincorporated community, United States
