= Hanan Anis =

Canadian engineer

Hanan Anis FEC is a Canadian engineer. She is NSERC Chair in Entrepreneurial Engineering Design at the University of Ottawa.

== Education ==
She graduated from Ain-Shams University, and the University of Toronto.

== Career ==
She worked for Nortel. She was the co-founder and Chief Technology Officer at Ceyba, an optical long-haul networking company.

She is currently a professor at University of Ottawa.

Anis was elected to the Canadian Academy of Engineering in 2020.

== Works ==
- Stamplecoskie, Kevin G.; Scaiano, Juan C.; Tiwari, Vidhu S.; Anis, Hanan (2011-02-10). "Optimal Size of Silver Nanoparticles for Surface-Enhanced Raman Spectroscopy". The Journal of Physical Chemistry C. 115 (5): 1403–1409. doi:10.1021/jp106666t. ISSN 1932-7447.
- Elliott, Catherine; Mavriplis, Catherine; Anis, Hanan (2020). "An entrepreneurship education and peer mentoring program for women in STEM: mentors' experiences and perceptions of entrepreneurial self-efficacy and intent". International Entrepreneurship and Management Journal. 16 (1): 43–67. doi:10.1007/s11365-019-00624-2. ISSN 1554-7191.
- Haysom, Joan E.; Jafarieh, Omid; Anis, Hanan; Hinzer, Karin; Wright, David (2015). "Learning curve analysis of concentrated photovoltaic systems". Progress in Photovoltaics: Research and Applications. 23 (11): 1678–1686. doi:10.1002/pip.2567. hdl:10393/32737. ISSN 1062-7995.
