= Judge Lydon =

Judge Lydon may refer to:

- Sherri Lydon (born 1962), judge of the United States District Court for the District of South Carolina
- Thomas J. Lydon (1927–2012), judge of the United States Court of Federal Claims
