= Motivation and Emotion =

- Language: English
- Edited by: Michael Richter

Publication details
- History: 1977–present
- Publisher: Springer Science+Business Media
- Frequency: Bimonthly
- Impact factor: 4.135 (2021)

Standard abbreviations
- ISO 4: Motiv. Emot.

Indexing
- ISSN: 0146-7239 (print); 1573-6644 (web)
- LCCN: 2004233213
- OCLC no.: 890312584

Links
- Journal homepage

Motivation and Emotion is a bimonthly peer-reviewed scientific journal covering psychology, with a specific focus on the study of motivation and emotion in humans and other animals. It was established in 1977 and is published by Springer Science+Business Media on behalf of the journal's official sponsor, the Society for the Science of Motivation. The founding editor-in-chief was Mortimer H. Appley, who served in this capacity from the journal's founding in 1977 until twelve years later, when he was replaced by Alice M. Isen. The journal's third editor-in-chief was Richard M. Ryan, who was succeeded by Johnmarshall Reeve (Korea University) in 2011. The current editor-in-chief is Michael Richter (Liverpool John Moores University). According to the Journal Citation Reports, the journal has a 2021 impact factor of 4.135.
