= Gunsmoke season 20 =

Gunsmoke
- Season 20
- Starring: James Arness; Ken Curtis; Milburn Stone; Buck Taylor; Fran Ryan
- No. of episodes: 24

Release
- Original network: CBS
- Original release: September 9, 1974 – March 31, 1975

Season chronology
- ← Previous; Season 19

Gunsmoke is an American Western television series developed by Charles Marquis Warren and based on the radio program of the same name. The series ran for 20 seasons, making it the longest-running Western in television history.

The first episode of season 20 aired in the United States on September 9, 1974, and the final episode aired on March 31, 1975. All episodes were broadcast in the U.S. by CBS.

Season 20 of Gunsmoke was the ninth season of color episodes, and the final season of the series. Previous seasons were filmed in black-and-white.

== Synopsis ==
Gunsmoke is set in and around Dodge City, Kansas, in the post-Civil War era and centers on United States Marshal Matt Dillon (James Arness) as he enforces law and order in the city. In its original format, the series also focuses on Dillon's friendship with deputy Festus Haggen (Ken Curtis); Doctor Galen "Doc" Adams (Milburn Stone), the town's physician; and deputy Newly O'Brien (Buck Taylor). Season 20 introduces a new character, Miss Hannah (Fran Ryan), to replace Miss Kitty (Amanda Blake) who left the show at the end of season 19.

== Cast and characters ==
=== Main ===
- James Arness as Matt Dillon
- Milburn Stone as Doc
- Ken Curtis as Festus
- Buck Taylor as Newly
- Fran Ryan as Hannah

== Production ==
Season 20 consisted of 24 one-hour color episodes produced by executive producer John Mantley along with producers Leonard Katzman (episodes 612-624, 635) and John G. Stephens (episodes 625-634), and associate producer Ron Honthaner.

Occasionally, titles were re-used. Season 20, episode 14 was the second time "The Squaw" was used as an episode title, the first being season 7, episode 7.

== Episodes ==
No. overall	No. in season	Title	Directed by	Written by	Original release date	Prod. code
612	1	"Matt Dillon Must Die"	Victor French	Ray Goldrup	September 9, 1974	0661
Crazed mass murder Abraham Wakefield (Morgan Woodward), motivated by the violent death of his precious Annabel (Elaine Fulkerson), is bent on avenging his son's death after Matt tracks him down and is forced to kill him. Abe captures Matt, and for sport, he and his remaining sons chase Matt in a manhunt through snow-capped mountain forests, intent on prolonging his suffering.
613	2	"Town in Chains"	Bernard McEveety	Ron Bishop	September 16, 1974	0656
Matt and Newly track a gang of bank robbers who are about to take over another town to do one last heist.
614	3	"The Guns of Cibola Blanca"	Gunnar Hellström	Paul Savage	September 23, 1974	0654
615	4	"The Guns of Cibola Blanca"	Gunnar Hellström	Paul Savage	September 30, 1974	0654
Part 1: After Ben, the son of ex-Confederate Colonel Lucius Shindro (Harold Gould), is wounded by fellow outlaw Evans, Major Coltrane (Richard Anderson) orders his band to hunt down Evans. Their hunt leads to Santa Fe where Doc and his friend Lyla (Dorothy Tristan) are heading back to Dodge. Badger and Ivers take them hostage and return to their desert stronghold so that Doc can treat Ben, and Ivers can take Lyla for his own purposes. Part 2: Matt, Festus and Newly pose as gunrunners hoping the outlaws will lead them to Colonel Lucius Shindro's compound, where they can formulate a plan to rescue Doc and Lyla.
616	5	"Thirty a Month and Found"	Bernard McEveety	Jim Byrnes	October 7, 1974	0653
Ramrod Will Parmalee (Gene Evans) and two of his drovers Doak (Nicholas Hammond) and Quincy (Van Williams) find their way of life jeopardized by the railroad. At trails-end in Dodge, they lose their complete earnings of $300 after a fight with railroad men in the Bull's Head saloon, turning them into desperadoes, with Matt and Festus hot on their heels.
617	6	"The Wiving"	Victor French	Earl W. Wallace	October 14, 1974	0652
Mountain farmer Jed Hocket (Harry Morgan) sends his three sons Ike, Luke and Shep into town to find brides.
618	7	"The Iron Men"	Gunnar Hellström	John Mantley	October 21, 1974	0660
Matt must help rehabilitate his friend and former lawman Chauncey Demon (Cameron Mitchell), who has turned to the bottle to help forget the slaying of his wife and boy by Indians. They must both be ready to face off against Carl Ryker (John Russell) and his hired guns.
619	8	"The Fourth Victim"	Bernard McEveety	Jim Byrnes	November 4, 1974	0659
A mad sniper has marked six citizens of Dodge City for summary execution, one per night, and it seems both Matt and Doc might be next. Can the marshal and his deputies find out who is behind it before it is too late?
620	9	"The Tarnished Badge"	Michael O'Herlihy	Robert Vincent Wright	November 11, 1974	0657
Matt reunites with his old friend Sheriff Bo Harker (Victor French) who rules Ludlow Kansas with an iron fist, with the help and respect of his deputy Barney Austin (Nick Nolte). Matt must then deal with Harker when he turns violent after being asked to resign by the town council.
621	10	"In Performance of Duty"	Gunnar Hellström	William Keys	November 18, 1974	0658
A family of outlaws led by their patriarch Emmet (David Huddleston) have always been one step ahead of the law by murdering and intimidation of loved-ones, witnesses, and judges. But Judge Kendall (Eduard Franz) has no such fear.
622	11	"Island in the Desert"	Gunnar Hellström	Jim Byrnes	December 2, 1974	0662
623	12	"Island in the Desert"	Gunnar Hellström	Jim Byrnes	December 9, 1974	0662
Part 1: Half-crazed desert hermit Ben Snow (Strother Martin) rescues Festus after being shot by outlaw Gard Dixon (William C. Watson). Part 2: Ben forces Festus to carry his gold and water for days across the desert to reach the town of Ten Strikes, so Ben can have his revenge against his old rival Sam Bristol. Along the way, they catch up with Dixon, and Matt and Newly trail behind to find and rescue Festus.
624	13	"The Colonel"	Bernard McEveety	Arthur Dales^{[C]}	December 16, 1974	0651
Ex-Army officer Colonel Josiah Johnson (Lee J. Cobb), feeling that he is a failure outside of military life, has become a town drunk, who must now deal with the upcoming marriage of his daughter Anne Ludley (Julie Cobb), and out-strategizing one last enemy.
625	14	"The Squaw"	Gunnar Hellström	Jim Byrnes	January 6, 1975	0665
With $5,000 in stolen Wells Fargo money, outlaw Gristy Calhoun (John Saxon) is on the run from both the law and his double-crossing cohorts. Out of water and with no horse, he must rely on the Cherokee squaw Quanah (Arlene Martel), who has been cast out from the Comanche, if he is to survive in the badlands.
626	15	"The Hiders"	Victor French	Paul Savage	January 13, 1975	0666
Festus tries to talk teenager Dink (Mitch Vogel) into leaving a gang of hide-cutters led by Karp (Ned Beatty), who have been stealing from farmers.
627	16	"Larkin"	Gunnar Hellström	Jim Byrnes	January 20, 1975	0667
Newly tries to take wanted killer Larkin (Richard Jaeckel) to Dodge with three bounty hunters hot on their trail, led by the ruthless Lon (Anthony Caruso).
628	17	"The Fires of Ignorance"	Victor French	Jim Byrnes	January 27, 1975	0668
Farm boy Tommy Harker (Lance Kerwin) wants some "book-learning" but his father Oliver Harker (John Vernon) pulls him out of school to work the farm. When Dodge school teacher Henry Decory (Allen Garfield) defends the boy's right to an education, Oliver assaults Henry, and the debate enters into a courtroom clash.
629	18	"The Angry Land"	Bernard McEveety	Story by : Herman Groves; Screenplay by : Jim Byrnes	February 3, 1975	0669
An orphaned girl, Bessie (Eileen McDonough), is turned away by her only relative, her aunt Rachel (Carol Vogel).
630	19	"Brides and Grooms"	Victor French	Earl W. Wallace	February 10, 1975	0673
Mountain farmer Jed Hocket (Harry Morgan) finally arranges to have his three sons, Ike, Luke and Shep marry the brides they took from Dodge, but Jinx Tobin might very well jynx it for Fran and Ike.
631	20	"Hard Labor"	Bernard McEveety	Story by : Hal Sitowitz; Screenplay by : Earl W. Wallace	February 24, 1975	0674
Matt tracks murder suspect Pete Murphy (Gerald McRaney) to another town and is forced to defend himself against him. Judge Flood (John Colicos) convicts Matt of murder and sentences him to life doing hard labor in the judge's silver mine.
632	21	"I Have Promises to Keep"	Vincent McEveety	Story by : William Putman; Screenplay by : William Putman and Earl W. Wallace	March 3, 1975	0671
The ailing Reverend Byrne (David Wayne) is determined to build a church for the Comanches, despite the objections of both the Comanches and the residents of Nescatunga, Kansas.
633	22	"The Busters"	Vincent McEveety	Jim Byrnes	March 10, 1975	0672
Bronco buster Harve Daley (Gary Busey) has only days to live after being thrown and kicked by a stallion and receiving a fatal brain injury. Mitch Hansen (John Beck), with the help of saloon girl Zoe (Lynn Benesch), is determined to be there for his friend until the very end.
634	23	"Manolo"	Gunnar Hellström	Story by : Harriet Charles and Earl W. Wallace; Screenplay by : Earl W. Wallace	March 17, 1975	0670
Basque sheepherder Manolo Etchahoun (Robert Urich), having sworn off violence after accidentally killing a boy, refuses to fight his father Alejo Etchahoun (Nehemiah Persoff) in order to prove his manhood.
635	24	"The Sharecroppers"	Leonard Katzman	Earl W. Wallace	March 31, 1975	0663
Lay about sharecropper Dibble Pugh (Victor French) threatened with eviction is given money by his daughter Av Marie Pugh (Susanne Benton) to buy a plow mule. But his dreamer-guitarist son Abel is swindled, and then shot in the leg by Festus while trying to make off with his mule Ruth. Festus bites off more than he wants to chew when he helps plow crops to make up for the injury.

== Release ==
=== Broadcast ===
Season twenty aired Mondays at 8:00-9:00 pm (EST) on CBS.

=== Home media ===
The final season was released on DVD by Paramount Home Entertainment on May 5, 2020.

== Reception ==
The final season of Gunsmoke finished at #28 in the Nielsen ratings.
