= Douglas Mills =

Douglas or Doug Mills may refer to:

- Douglas R. Mills (1907–1993), American college basketball player and coach
- Douglas L. Mills (1940–2012), American physicist and writer
- Doug Mills (photographer) (born 1960), American photographer covering the White House
