= Roger Andewelt =

American judge (1946–2001)

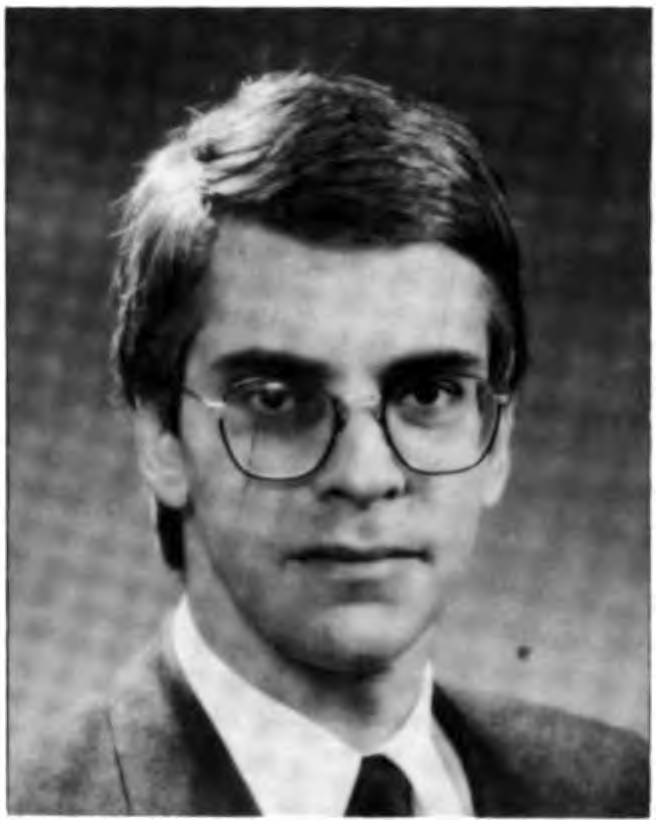

Judge of the United States Court of Federal Claims
- In office May 20, 1987 – August 7, 2001
- Appointed by: Ronald Reagan
- Preceded by: Thomas J. Lydon
- Succeeded by: Susan G. Braden

Personal details
- Born: August 4, 1946 Brooklyn, New York, U.S.
- Died: August 7, 2001 (aged 55) Washington, D.C., U.S.
- Education: Brooklyn College (BS); George Washington University (JD)

Roger Barry Andewelt (August 4, 1946 – August 7, 2001) was a judge of the United States Court of Federal Claims from 1987 to 2001.

Born in Brooklyn, New York, Andewelt received a Bachelor of Science from Brooklyn College in 1967, and served as a patent examiner in the United States Patent Office from 1968 to 1972. During this time, he received a Juris Doctor from the George Washington University Law School in 1971. He then worked in the United States Department of Justice for fifteen years, first as a trial attorney in the Appellate Section from 1972 to 1974, then in the Intellectual Property Section as a trial attorney from 1974 to 1978, as assistant chief from 1978 to 1981, and as chief of the section from 1981 to 1984. He was deputy director of operations from 1984 to 1986, and deputy assistant attorney general for litigation from 1986 to 1987.

On March 3, 1987, President Ronald Reagan nominated Andewelt to a seat on the U.S. Claims Court vacated by Thomas J. Lydon. Andewelt was confirmed by the United States Senate on May 19, 1987, and received his commission the following day. He served until his death, in Washington, D.C.
