= Guy Boucher (actor) =

- Born: 1943
- Died: 20 March 2012 (aged 68–69)
- Occupation: Musician

Guy Boucher (1943 – 20 March 2012) was a French Canadian actor, singer and radio and TV presenter.

He was best known as co-presenter of the TV show Les coqueluches with Gaston L'Heureux from 1974 to 1978, mid-days at the Complexe Desjardins, Montréal.
