= Alice M. Isen =

American psychologist

- Died: February 29, 2012
- Education: University of Pennsylvania, Stanford University
- Occupations: Psychologist and professor

Alice M. Isen was an American psychologist and Professor of Psychology and of Marketing at Cornell University. A prominent and widely published scholar, her research concerned the influence of "positive affect" on social interaction, thought processes, and decision making, including applications to organizational behavior, medical decision making, doctor-patient interaction, issues in services marketing, and issues related to brand equity and loyalty.

== Background ==
Isen received her Ph.D. from Stanford University in 1968, an MA in Psychology also from Stanford in 1966, and a BA in Russian Language and Literature from the University of Pennsylvania in 1963. According to Fredrickson:

Isen’s dissertation, chaired by Walter Mischel and published in the Journal of Personality and Social Psychology, tested her intuition-based hypotheses regarding the “warm glow of success.” Using clever behavioral measures, she found that people randomly assigned to experience success were more generous, helpful, and attentive to others, relative to those randomly assigned to experience failure or to receive no performance feedback whatsoever.

She taught at the University of Maryland, Baltimore County 1972–1989, then joined Cornell as the SC Johnson Professor of Marketing and Professor of Psychology. Alice served as Editor of the peer-reviewed Springer journal Motivation and Emotion and a member of the editorial board of other psychology and marketing journals, and a member of the executive committee of the Society for Consumer Psychology. She died on February 29, 2012.

== Works ==
Isen is known for her work on positive emotions. Along with a group of researchers she conducted a series of experiments that show how these emotions have effects on decision-making. Isen found that positive emotions facilitate creativity, successful problem-solving and negotiation, as well as thoroughness and efficiency during the decision-making process. Her work on this particular area has been applied to different fields such as medical diagnosis (e.g. facilitating memory retrieval, organizational efficiency).

== Major recent publications ==
=== Peer-reviewed journal articles ===
- Erez, A. & Isen, A.M. (2002). "The Influence of Positive Affect on Components of Expectancy Motivation." Journal of Applied Psychology, 87(6): 1055–1067.
- Isen, A. M. (2002). "Missing in Action in the AIM: Positive Affect's Facilitation of Cognitive Flexibility, Innovation, and Problem Solving." Psychological Inquiry 13(1): 57–65.
- Isen, A. M. (2001). "An Influence of Positive Affect on Decision Making in Complex Situations: Theoretical Issues with Practical Implications."Journal of Consumer Psychology 11(2): 75–85.
- Isen, A. M. (2000). "Some Perspectives on Positive Affect and Self-Regulation." Psychological Inquiry 11(3): 184–187.

Incompleto

=== Book chapters ===
- Isen, A.M. & Erez, A. (2006). Some measurement issues in the study of affect. In A. D. Ong and M.H.M. van Dulmen (Eds.), Oxford Handbook of Methods in Positive Psychology (pp. 250–265). NY: Oxford.
- Isen, A.M. (2004). "Some Perspectives on Positive Feelings and Emotions: Positive Affect Facilitates Thinking and Problem Solving." In Manstead, A.S.R., N. Frijda, and A. Fischer (Eds.) Feelings and Emotions: The Amsterdam Symposium. (pp. 263–281). NY: Cambridge.
- Isen, A. M. "Positive Affect as a Source of Human Strength." in The Psychology of Human Strengths. L. G. Aspinwall and U. Staudinger.
- Isen, A.M. & Labroo, A.A. (2003). "Some Ways in Which Positive Affect Facilitates Decision Making and Judgment." In S. Schneider & J. Shanteau (Eds.) Emerging Perspectives on Judgment and Decision Research. NY, Cambridge: 365–393.
- Isen, A.M. (2003). "Positive Affect, Systematic Cognitive Processing, and Behavior: Toward Integration of Affect, Cognition, and Motivation. In F. Dansereau and F.J. Yammarino (Eds.) Multi-level Issues in Organizational Behavior and Strategy, (p.55-62). Oxford, UK: JAI/Elsevier Science.
- Isen, A. M. (2002). "A Role for Neuropsychology in Understanding the Facilitating Influence of Positive Affect on Social Behavior and Cognitive Processes." Handbook of Positive Psychology. C. R. Snyder and S. J. Lopez. Oxford, England and New York, NY, Oxford University Press: Chapter 38: 528–540.
- Isen, A. M. (2000). "Positive Affect and Decision Making." Handbook of Emotions. 2nd Edition, M. Lewis and J. M. Haviland-Jones. New York, Guilford
