= Hertha Engelbrecht =

German lawyer

- Born: 28 March 1922; Hamburg, Germany
- Died: 24 March 2012 (aged 89); Bad Honnef, Germany
- Occupation: Lawyer
- Known for: Head of the Representation of the Free and Hanseatic City of Hamburg to the Federal Government; leadership roles in the German Women Lawyers Association

Hertha Engelbrecht (born 28 March 1922 in Hamburg; died 24 March 2012 in Bad Honnef) was a German lawyer, as Senate director for 27 years head of the representation of the Free and Hanseatic City of Hamburg at the Federal. In addition, she was chairman, honorary chairman and managing director of the German Lawyer's Association. In 1965, she became the successor to the lawyer Charlotte Graf chairwoman of the German Lawyer's Association (djb) and held this function for two years until 1967. Subsequently, she followed the notary and former chairman Renate Lenz-Fuchs as chairman, while she was honorary chairman of the djb. After her retirement on March 27, 1985, Niels Jonas succeeded her as head of the representation of the Free and Hanseatic City of Hamburg to the federal government. In 1986, she became honorary executive director of the djb in Bonn and retained this position until 1997.
