= Johnmarshall Reeve =

American psychologist

- Born: October 6, 1959 (age 66)
- Education: Tennessee Technological University; Texas Christian University
- Known for: Research on motivation
- Scientific career
- Fields: Psychology
- Institutions: Korea University; Australian Catholic University
- Thesis: The role of cooperative cues in increasing the probability of cooperation in eight situations: A test of the synergy hypothesis (1986)
- Doctoral advisor: Steven G. Cole
- Doctoral students: Leah Arndt (1995). Dan Carrell (2003). Ching-Mei Tseng (2009). Yulan Su (2009). Hue-Ryen Jang (2014). Sophia Ahn (2017). Stephanie Shin (2018). Lois Seefeldt (1997). Jim Bohn (2002). Pat Hardre (2002). Leslie Forstadt (2006). Kristen Rizzo (2006). Soohyun Jeon (2007). Chin-Fang Huang (2010). Woogul Lee (2012). Hye-Ryen Jang (2019).

Johnmarshall Reeve (born October 6, 1959) is an American psychologist whose research focuses on educational psychology and human motivation. He is a professor in the Institute of Positive Psychology and Education at Australian Catholic University and a former editor-in-chief of the peer-reviewed journal Motivation and Emotion. Johnmarshall Reeve received his Bachelor's of Arts degree in psychology in 1982 at Tennessee Technological University, his Master's of Arts degree in experimental psychology in 1985 at Texas Christian University, and graduated with his Ph.D. in experimental psychology in 1986 at Texas Christian University. Dr. Reeve's doctoral dissertation is titled "The role of situational cues in increasing the probability of cooperative behavior in eight situations: A test of the synergy hypothesis."

Academic Positions:

- Johnmarshall Reeve has worked at the following universities during the listed dates:
- Australian Catholic University, Professor, February 2019-present
- University of Iowa, Department of Pediatric Dentistry, Visiting Professor, February 2019-present
- Korea University (Seoul, South Korea), Professor, September 2009-February 2019
- University of Wisconsin-Milwaukee, Professor, September 2008-August 2009
- University of Iowa (Iowa City, IA), Professor, September 2005-August 2008
- University of Iowa, Associate Professor, September 1999-August 2005
- University of Iowa, Assistant Professor, September 1998-August 1999
- University of Wisconsin-Milwaukee, Associate Professor, September 1997-August 1998
- University of Wisconsin-Milwaukee, Assistant Professor, September 1992-August 1997
- University of Rochester (Rochester, NY), Post-doctoral Fellow, September 1990-August 1992
- Cornell University (Ithaca, NY), Instructor (Summer Program only), 1988–1990
- Ithaca College (Ithaca, NY), Assistant Professor, September 1987-August 1990
- Trinity University (San Antonio, TX), Instructor, September 1986-August 1987

Awards and Recognitions:

Awards

2018 Research Excellence, Korea University

2017 Research Excellence, Korea University

2015 Excellence in Research Award - Award co-recipient (with Sung Hyeon Cheon) for the most outstanding article

published in the 2014 volume of the Journal of Sport and Exercise Psychology.

$750. stipend.

2005 Thomas N. Urban Research Award - Award given by the Iowa Academy of Education and the FINE (First in the

Nation in Education) Foundation to recognize the outstanding published paper of

the year that shows how research can be used to enhance educational practice.

$3,000 stipend.

2008–2010 Chair, Motivation in Education SIG, American Education Research Association.
