= Maurice Moyer =

Civil rights activist (1918–2012)

Maurice J. Moyer
- Born: August 8, 1918; Chattanooga, Tennessee, U.S.
- Died: March 6, 2012 (aged 93); Newar, Delaware, U.S.
- Occupations: Minister, civil rights activist
- Known for: Founder of Delaware's first Black Presbyterian church

Maurice J. Moyer (August 8, 1918 – March 6, 2012) was an African-American Christian minister from Delaware and a civil rights advocate who marched with Martin Luther King Jr. In 1955, he started Delaware's first black Presbyterian church.

== Biography ==
Moyer was a native of Chattanooga, Tennessee. He was the son of Charles Raymond and Flora Adelia Moyer. At the age of 4, his family moved to Cleveland, Ohio, later returning to Chattanooga where he graduated from Howard High School. He served in the Navy from 1938 to 1945.

He attended Lincoln University, Lincoln Theological Seminary (graduated in 1949), and Princeton Seminary. He joined the Alpha Phi Alpha fraternity in 1947.

He founded the Community Presbyterian Church, the first black Presbyterian Church in Delaware, on Rogers Road in New Castle in 1955, and served as the church's pastor for 46 years, retiring in 1998. In 1963–1964, he was the first black moderator of the New Castle Presbytery.

Moyer fought against the Delaware Innkeepers Law, which allowed proprietors to refuse service to anyone; it was revoked in 1963. He was instrumental in getting the first African-American hired by Diamond State Telephone (now Verizon Delaware).

He died on March 6, 2012, at the Christiana Hospital. Upon his death, Governor Jack Markell ordered flags in Wilmington and New Castle County lowered in his honor.

== Other roles ==
- 1960–1964: President of the Wilmington branch of the NAACP
- Founder of the Metropolitan Wilmington Urban League
- 1965–1966: Program Coordinator of the Neighborhood Youth Corps under the Wilmington Board of Education
- 1966–1967: Project Director of Community Schools for New Castle County Department of Parks and Recreation
- 1967–1970: Career Coordinator at Bancroft Middle School
- 1970–1972: Administrator of the Layton Home for Aged Persons

== Awards ==
- 1962: Omega Psi Phi Citizen's Award

== Private life ==
Moyer married Vivian Cleopatra on 13 October 1944. He had two sons: Thomas Jerome (1947) and Norman Gayraud (1950).

== Places named after him ==
- Maurice J. Moyer Academy: Professional training school in Wilmington
