= Abdullah al-Dahdouh =

Muslim scholar from Morocco

Abdullah Al-Dahdouh (Arabic: عبد الله الدهدوه, 1966 Tangier, Morocco – 13 March 2012 Brussels, Belgium) was a Muslim scholar from Morocco. He established the Islamic Center of Imam Reza in Brussels, Belgium.

== Biography ==
Al-Dahdouh was born in Tangier, Morocco in 1966. Hailing from a Sunni family, he decided to go to Qom, in Iran, in 1980 to continue his religious education in the Hawza of Qom.

== Death ==
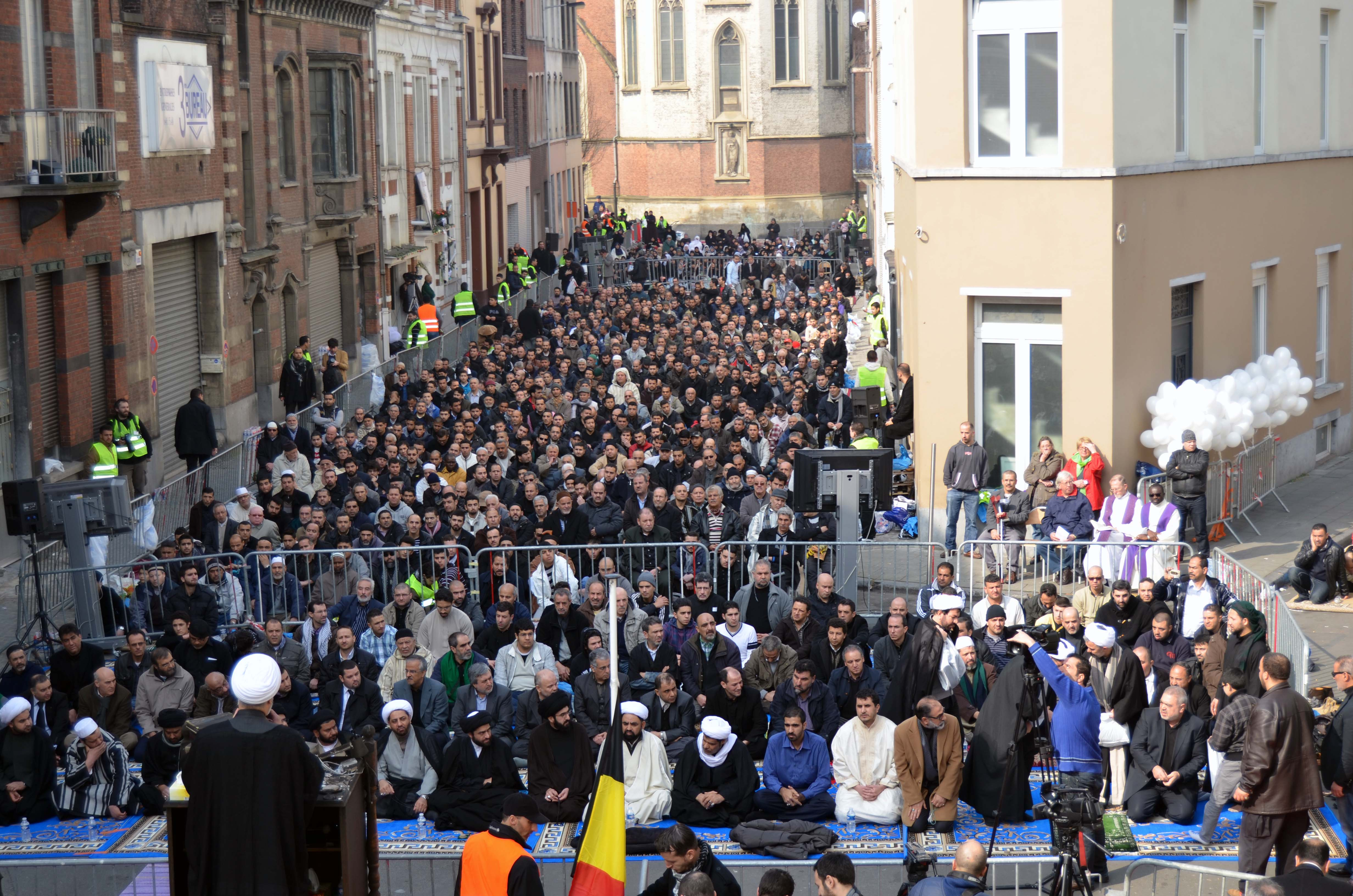
Sheikh Abdullah Dahdouh funeral

Al-Dahdouh was murdered in an unprovoked attack by a Moroccan Sunni in the Islamic Center of Imam Reza in Brussels, Belgium on 13 March 2012.
