= Mohamed Kassas =

Egyptian botanist (1921–2012)

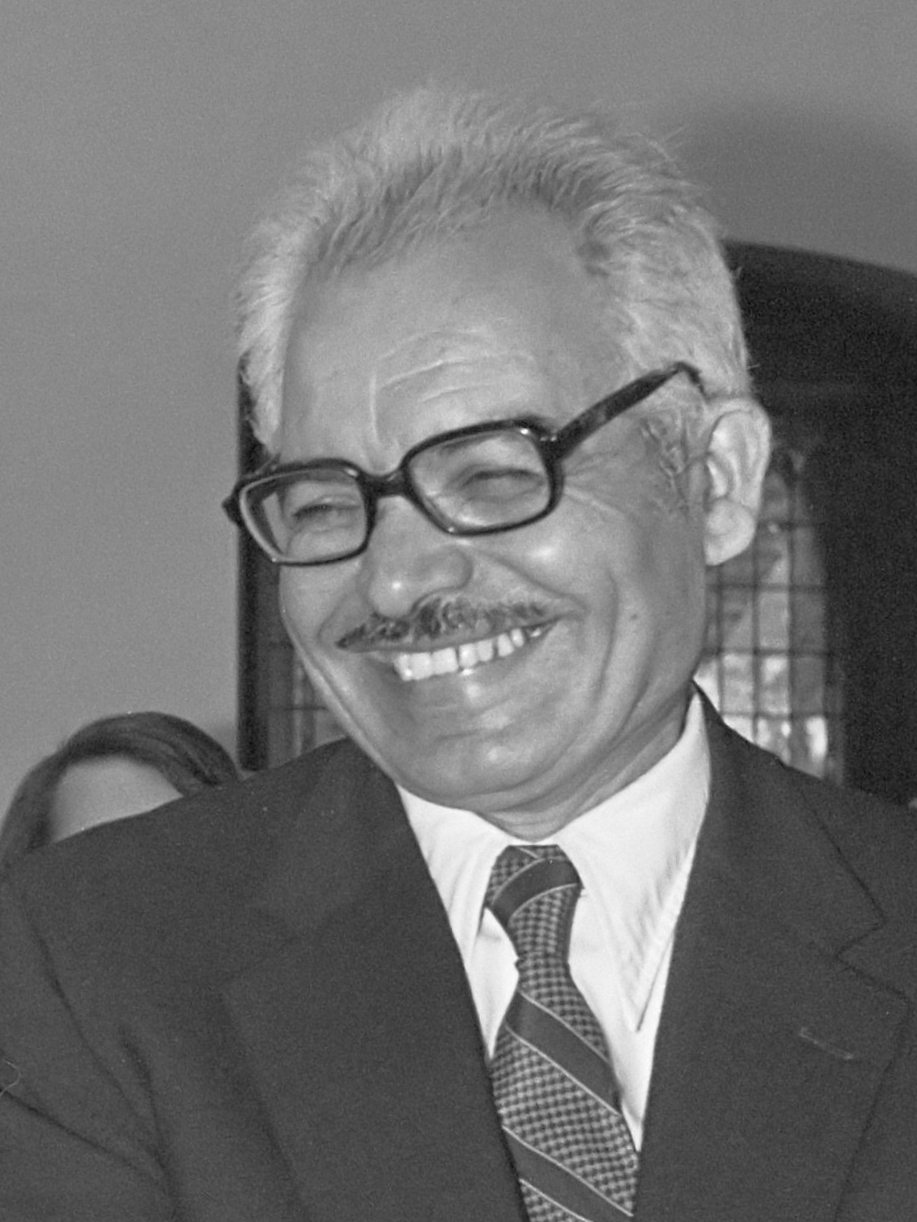
Mohamed Al-Kassas (1980)

Dr. Mohamed Abdel Fattah Al-Kassas (also known as Mohamed Kassas, 6 July 1921 – 21 March 2012) was an Egyptian botanist and conservationist. He was professor emeritus for Botany at the University of Cairo and a specialist in Arid land Ecology.

He studied at the University of Cairo, where he received a B.Sc. in 1944 and a M.Sc. in 1947, and at the University of Cambridge (Ph.D. in 1950). A specialist in the ecology of desert plants, and was among the first to publish on the topic of desertification. Kassas was an advisory member of the United Nations Environment Programme from its beginning, and from 1978 to 1984 president of the International Union for Conservation of Nature (IUCN). In 1981, he was appointed a member of the Shura Council, the upper house of the Parliament of Egypt. He was a fellow of the Indian National Academy of Science and the world Academy of Art and Science, and member of the Club of Rome. He was a founding member of the Arab Forum for Environment and Development (2007). He received Honorary Doctorate Degree from universities in the Sudan, Sweden, Egypt and USA, and was on the editorial boards of several international journals in fields of ecology and environmental sciences.

His principal research interests during the last 55 years were in plant ecology, especially in arid lands. He and his students surveyed plant life in the deserts and coastal lands of Egypt, Sudan, Saudi Arabia and Iraq and contributed to the basic understanding of the ecology of the desert vegetation. He was among the pioneers who warned the world against hazards of desertification, contributed to the UNESCO Arid Lands Research Program, (1950–1960) and to the scientific preparation for the United Nations Conference on Desertification (1977) and was senior Advisor to the Intergovernmental committee that negotiated the Convention on Desertification (1992–1994).

== Honours ==
Egypt

- First Order of Science and Arts (1959)
- Order of the Republic (1978)
- First Order of Merit (1981)
- State Science Prize (1982)

International

- The Golden Order for Education (Sudan, 1978)
- United Nations Prize for Environment (1978)
- Arab League Educational, Cultural and Scientific Organization (ALECSO) Gold Medal (1978)
- Commander in the Order of the Golden Ark (The Netherlands, 1981)
- Commander: the Swedish Royal Order of the Polar Star (1998)
- Zayed (UAE) International Prize for Environment (2001)
