= Roger Cooke (artist) =

American artist (1941–2012)

- Born: January 24, 1941; Portland, Oregon, U.S.
- Died: March 27, 2012 (aged 71)
- Education: Portland State University; ArtCenter College of Design
- Occupations: Artist; muralist
- Spouse: Edna Stoltzfus (m. 1969)
- Children: 4

Roger Cooke (January 24, 1941 – March 27, 2012) was an American artist and muralist. His work is best known for its historical depictions of local Native American tribes. He has painted over 60 murals across the country, particularly in small towns along the Oregon Trail, although few still remain.

== Personal life and career ==
Roger Cooke was born on January 24, 1941, in Portland, Oregon. His interest in fine art began in his adolescence with his enrollment in Art Instruction School's Correspondence Course. He would eventually attend Portland State University for two years in its art program before finishing a four-year bachelor’s degree in illustration at the ArtCenter College of Design in Los Angeles in 1970. His freelance-illustration career began in Oregon after two years with Jackson-Zendor Studio in Indianapolis, Indiana. His career in oil painting began in 1974.

He married Edna Stoltzfus on September 20, 1969, and had four children. The two of them spent that last 40 years of his life in Sandy, Oregon, where much of his illustrations and paintings were created. His inspiration drew most heavily upon the nature of Oregon and the life of pioneers and Native Americans. Roger Cooke heavily researched his motifs before painting. His style is best known for its soft backgrounds and realistic people.

Roger Cooke died on March 27, 2012, after a three year battle with Multiple Myeloma cancer. The website with his artwork was maintained by his wife Edna Cooke until her death on June 7, 2017. The website no longer exists.

== Murals ==
=== Native American history ===
Located along the corner of Broadway and Holladay in Seaside, Oregon, stands a 60-foot mural depicting the historical lifestyle of the Clatsop-Nehalem tribes. The mural was dedicated on September 6, 2008. The town of Seaside celebrated the event with a community art-walk of local artists, a carving demonstration, and storytelling from, “Elaine Grinnell of the Sklallam Tribe, Roberta Basch, a Clatsop-Nehalem and Puyallup, and Doug Deur, a Clatsop-Nehalem historian.”

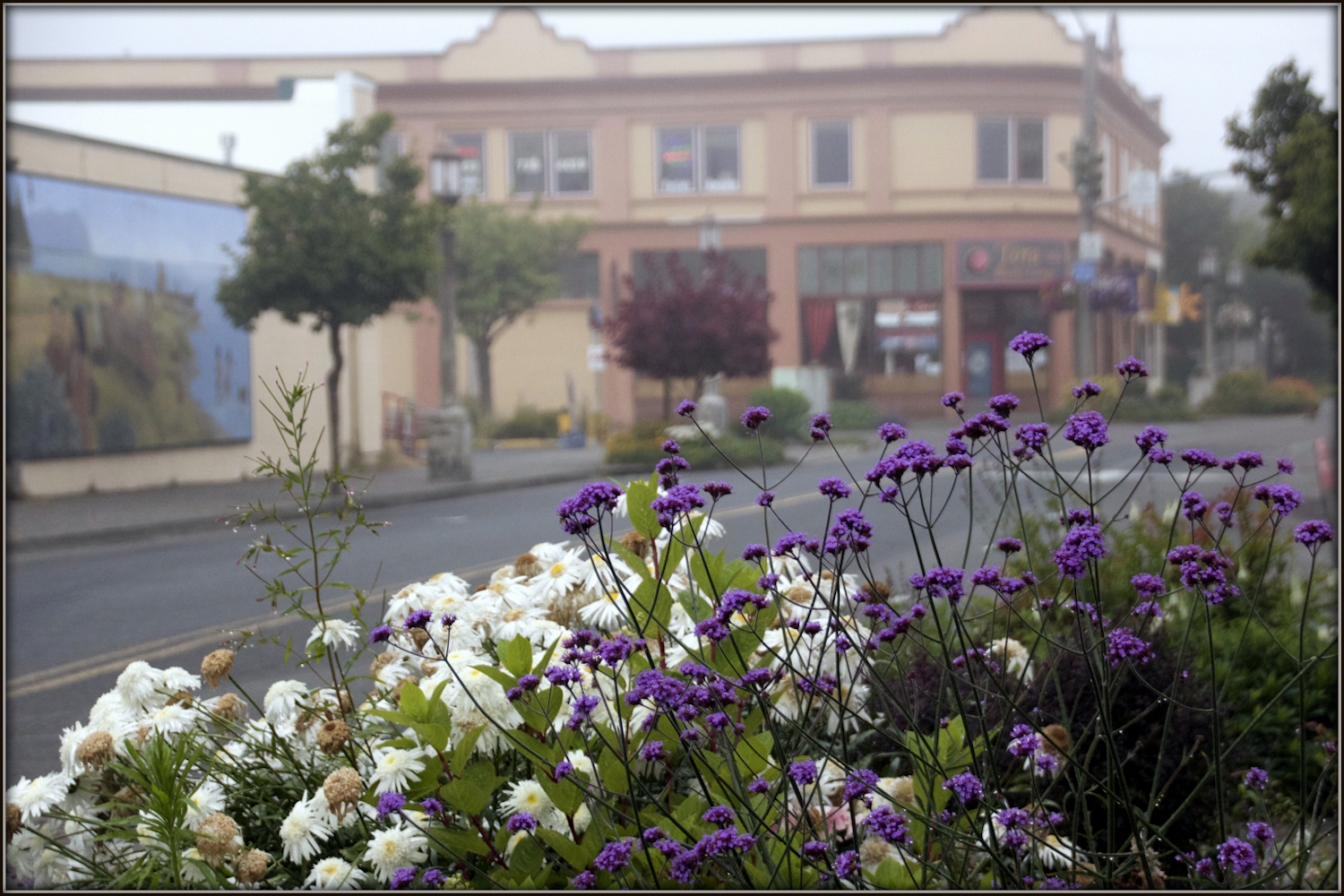
Broadway and Holladay intersection in Seaside, OR. The mural is located on the left of this road.

One notable figure depicted in the mural is Chief Tostum of the Clatsop-Nehalem tribe in the 1800s. He was the last chief of the Clatsop-Nehalem tribes. His descendant, Diane Collier, participated in the mural’s dedication.

Originally a transitional site in which tribes passed through while heading north or south, the nineteenth-century turned this area into a site of refuge. Military fortification, epidemics, and the like all contributed to the displacement of the Clatsop people. Some migrated northward while others headed south. Some more found sanctuary in what is now known as Seaside. Seaside, along with other sites from Bay Center, Washington to Garibaldi, Oregon, became a powerful resource for other displaced families and tribes. It allowed them a place to regroup and adapt to the fast-paced changes of the Pacific Northwest.

=== Peaceful Vistas ===
“Peaceful Vistas” is a mural located in Sandy, Oregon, painted in 1993. It depicts a family of pioneers, with their wagon, crossing Barlow Road.

Established in 1845, the Barlow Road (also known as the Mount Hood Road) was a stretch of the Oregon Trail that provided families with a safer route around Mount Hood. The alternative path required rafts that would carry wagons along the Columbia River (as depicted in Cooke’s print “Drifting the Columbia”). It was approved in 1845 by Oregon Legislature and completed by 1846. It passed through many owners. Its final private owner, Henry Wemme, acquired it in 1912. It has been under the ownership of the state of Oregon since 1919. Signs in Sandy now show the historical route of the Barlow Road for visitors to drive along. The Barlow road began in The Dalles and ended in Oregon City.

=== The Firebaugh Kids ===
“The Firebaugh Kids” is a mural located in Exeter, California. The mural depicts three children of the town's founder, John Franklin Firebaugh, in a wagon filled with milk containers being pulled by a horse.
