= Hernán Elizondo Arce =

Hernán Elizondo Arce (October 28, 1921 in Santo Domingo de Heredia - March 22, 2012 in Esparza, Costa Rica) is a Costa Rican novelist and poet.

== Early life ==
According to the official registry, Elizondo Arce was born in 1920 (his mother claims the date was one year later in 1921). His father was Leonardo Elizondo Bolañdo of Heredia, a military guard and a Costa Rica's first polo team member, and his wife Maclovia Arce Vargas of Orotina. Their five oldest children were born in Orotina, but Hernán, the youngest, was born in Santo Domingo de Heredia. When he was six years old, the family moved to Tilarán, Guanacaste, where he attended primary school. He claims to have gone barefoot until age sixteen. After finishing his studies, he worked as a rural teacher and subsequently as municipal secretary. He left Tilarán for San José where he worked in the National Bank, attended high school at night and began publishing poems in El Diaro de Costa Rica. He then returned to Tilarán to care for his aging parents and was employed the high school secretary where he finished his secondary degree. Subsequently, he took a university correspondence course in administrative organization, and in 1967 was transferred to Esparta where he served as assistant director of the high school. Earlier he had married Arracelly Vargas and with her had eight children, one of whom is deceased.

== Writing career ==
As a young boy Hernán Elizondo began writing poetry about his native Tilarán, encouraged by the Catalan educator, Don Domingo Flaqué. In 1945 at age twenty-four he published Alma, Dolar y Paisaje, a book of poems about rural life. The book contained a prologue by Don Pepé Figueres who recognized the talent of the young poet. A second book of poetry, Alma Criolla, appeared in 1953 and included the poem "Patria Mia" which won the Juegos Florales international prize.

Hernán Elizondo's most well-received novel, Memorias de un Pobre Diablo, was translated into German and English, saw eight editions, and won several prizes, including first prize in both Juegos Florales in 1963 and Aquileo Echeverría de Novela in 1964. This novel explored rural Guanacaste with all its social, political and economic problems.

Several other novels followed: La Ciudad y la Sombra, La Calle, el Jinete y Yo, Muerto al Amanecer, Adios, Prestiño, De Este Lado de la Eternidad, and most recently Capitán, Mi Capitán, the story of the Costa Rican war of 1948. Hernán Elizondo is also the author of La Ventana, a collection of stories published in the newspaper Excelsio, a compilation of articles published in Diario Extra under the title Como La Ventana, and El Santo, el Niño y el Mar, a long story about the life of Fray Casiano of Madrid.

Hernán Elizondo, first discovered by Don Pepé Figueres, has left his mark on Costa Rican fiction and poetry, especially by capturing rural life in Guanacaste with all its hardship and humanity.

Source: Camilio Rodríguez Ch., "Hernán Elizondo Arce, El poeta que descubrio Don Pepe," Mirada A La Actualidad, San José, Costa Rica, Sept. 27 – Oct. 14, 2006, pp. 18 – 19.

Dana Greene

== Bibliography ==
- Adiós, Prestiño
- La ventana
- Anecdotas y relatos
- De este lado de la eternidad
- Alma, dolor y paisaje
- Memorias de un pobre diablo
- De este lado de la eternidad
- Muerte al amanecer
- Santo el niño y el mar
- Ciudad y sombra
- Calle, jinete y yo
