= Joe Stanley (colonel) =

United States Air Force officer

Joseph Stanley (January 28, 1908 – March 15, 2012) was an American United States Air Force Colonel. Stanley, a veteran pilot of World War II, served as the commander of Eglin Air Force Base in Valparaiso, Florida during the 1950s.

Stanley was born on January 28, 1908, and raised in Memphis, Tennessee. He enlisted in the Army Air Corps in 1935. Stanley commanded a B-17 squadron during World War II. He became the commander of Eglin Air Force Base during the 1950s. Stanley was also stationed in Vienna, Paris, Egypt and Berlin during his Air Force career.

Stanley and his wife moved to the Westwood Retirement Resort in Fort Walton Beach, Florida, in 1994. His wife, Betty, died in 2003 on her 100th birthday. Joe Stanley died on March 15, 2012, in Florida at the age of 104.
