= John Mallison =

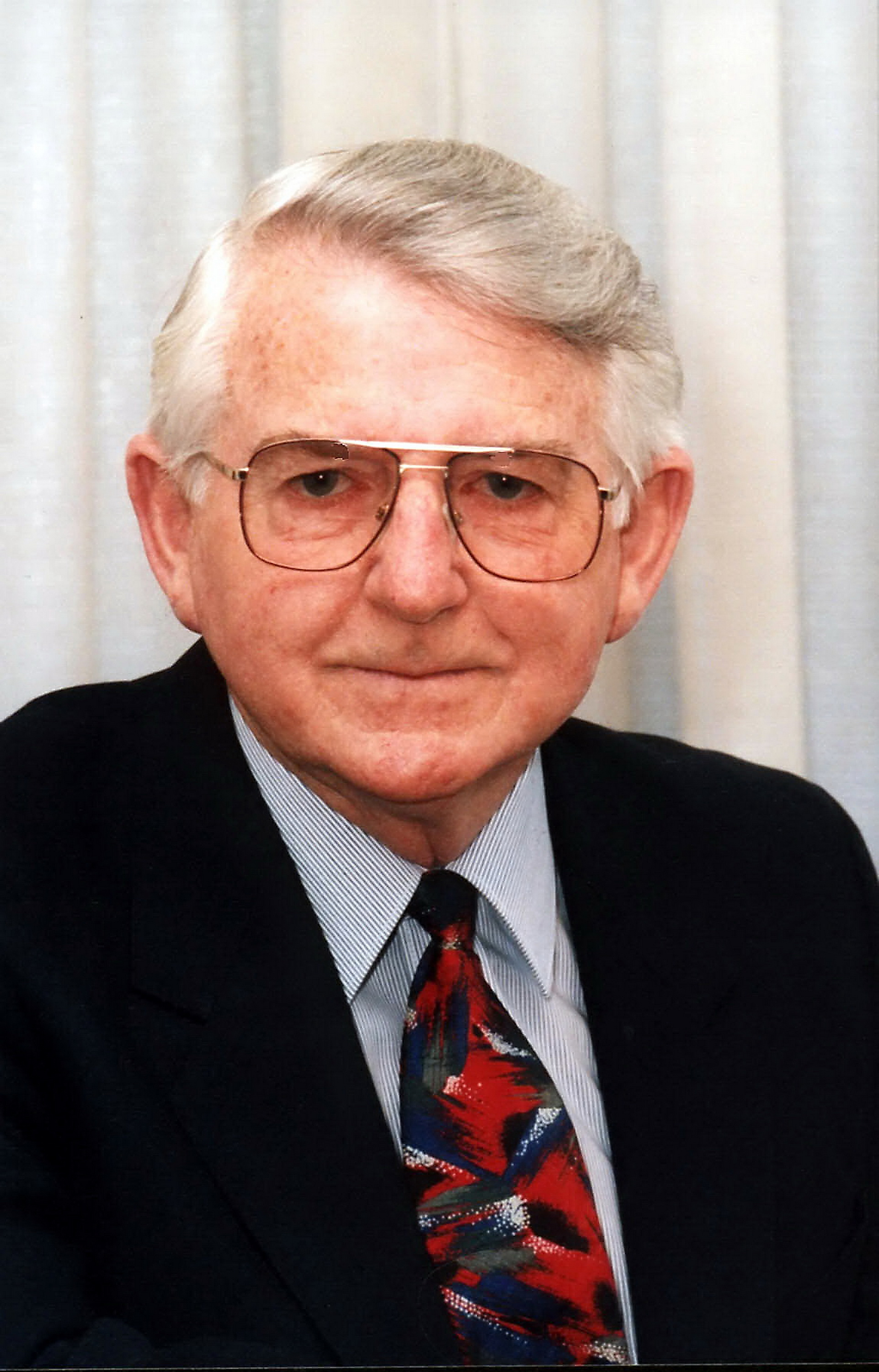
Rev John Mallison OAM

John Mallison OAM (15 May 1929 – 29 March 2012) was an Australian Christian pastor, mentor, author and teacher who taught in 29 countries.

== Ministry and work ==
For 17 years he was a parish minister, first with the Methodist Church of Australasia and then with the Uniting Church in Australia; he was ordained on 6 May 1958. For 23 years, he directed John Mallison Ministries, equipping Christian leadership. He retired on 31 December 1995.

He played a major role in maximising the impact of Christian small groups. He was the 7th Moderator of the Uniting Church in Australia in New South Wales.

He was the original Director of Mentoring for the Australian Arrow Leadership Program.

== Honours ==
In 2003 he was awarded a Medal of the Order of Australia for his social work which included the founding of the Port Kembla Nursing Service in 1960 and the original Newcastle Youth Service in 1965, as well as his innovative church work.

Mallison received an honorary Doctorate of Theology from the Australian College of Theology for "a substantial contribution to theological learning and for a notable contribution to the life and work of the church".

== Books ==
Mallison wrote 24 books including:

- Mentoring to Develop Disciples and Leaders (1998, revised 2007).
- Postcards on a Journey (2007).
