= Selma Rubin =

American environmentalist and activist (1915–2012)

Selma Rubin (March 28, 1915 – March 9, 2012) was an American environmentalist and environmental activist. She was called a co-founder of Earth Day. Rubin was a member or adviser for more than forty organizations spanning more than 57 years. Many of the grassroot organizations she co-foundered are still thriving today like the Environmental Defense Center (EDC), the Community Environmental Council (CEC), the ACLU, SBCAN, and the Fund for Santa Barbara among them.

== Biography ==
She was raised in Toledo, Ohio, and served in the United States Navy from 1943 to 1945 during World War II. She and her husband, Bill, moved to Santa Barbara, California, from Los Angeles in 1964, where she took a position as an accountant.

Rubin had been involved in some activism prior to 1969. However, the turning point for her came during the 1969 Santa Barbara oil spill, which began on January 28, 1969, and became the largest environmental disaster in U.S. history at the time. The spill, which lasted for eleven days and polluted the Santa Barbara Channel with almost 100,000 barrels of crude oil, killed thousands of seabirds and other aquatic wildlife. She, along with thousands of other volunteers, responded to the spill, which galvanized her environmental activism. A community stalwart, she served on 42 nonprofit boards since she arrived in Santa Barbara in 1964. In 1970, she successfully led a voter campaign to preserve the Gaviota Coast of California from a proposal to build 1,535 condos in the area.

She and another activist, Anna Laura Myers, collected more than 12,000 signatures for a ballot initiative, which easily defeated the proposal. Rubin spearheaded a compromise for the Gaviota Coast, which allowed for much of the area's preservation, as well as the construction of the El Capitán Canyon Resort and a campground. She Rubin co-founded the Community Environmental Council, one of the world's first environmental organizations, in 1974. She also co-founded the Environmental Defense Center in 1977.

Selma Rubin died at her home in Santa Barbara, California, on March 9, 2012, aged 96.
