= Khelifi Ahmed =

Algerian singer

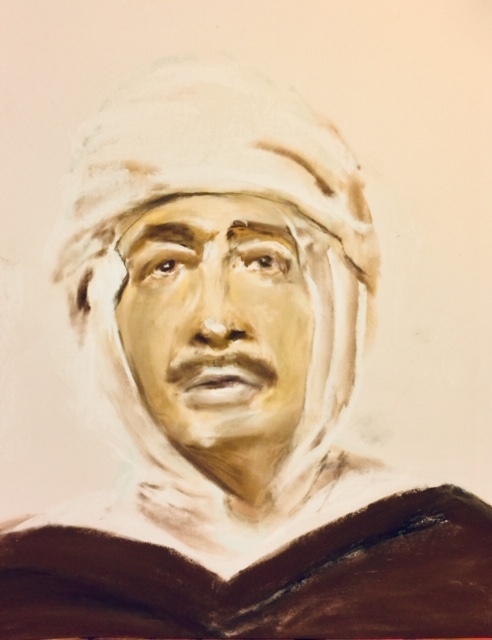
- Born: January 1, 1921; Sidi Khaled
- Died: March 18, 2018 (aged 97)
- Occupations: Singer; Translator; Poet; Writer; Journalist

Khelifi Ahmed (in Arabic خليفي أحمد) (Biskra, Algeria, 1921 – 18 March 2012) was an Algerian singer and master of Algerian Bedouin songs.

== Early life ==
He was born as Ahmed Al-Abbas Benaissa (in Arabic أحمد العباس بن عيسى) at Sidi Khaled, a small town near Biskra (Algeria) and his parents were farmers. He studied at the Koranic school and sang in the Rahmania brotherhood religious choir. His maternal uncle El Hadj Benkhelifa encouraged him to sing of traditional Sahara songs and poetry and he took the pseudonym of his uncle, emanating from the tribe Ouled Benkhelifa. He later on changed his name to Khelifi and had his first recording as an adolescent.

== Career ==
By the 1950s, he had acquired great fame in Algeria, was also popular as a pan-Arab known name as well as internationally, particularly in France and is winner of a great number of awards.
