= Lee Balterman =

American photographer (1920–2012)

Lee Balterman (1920 – March 16, 2012) was an American photographer. Born in Chicago, Illinois, Balterman graduated from high school in 1938, and later took evening classes in drawing and painting at the Art Institute of Chicago. In 1942, during World War II, Balterman enlisted in the US Army Reserves. First stationed in England, he then served in Clichy, France, working as a hospital aide and later as an army photographer. After being discharged in 1946, Balterman returned to Chicago and began working as a freelance photographer for the Globe, Rapho-Guillumette, and Black Star agencies, as well as producing covers for periodicals such as Life, Fortune, and Sports Illustrated. He was noted in particular as a photograph of ballet. He died in 2012, aged 91.

== In popular media ==
In 2010, Balterman was interviewed by famous Chicago Cubs fan Jerry Pritikin, known as the Bleacher Preacher. During the interview, Balterman and Pritikin discussed Balterman's Cubs' stories and historical photo assignments.
