= Himanish Goswami =

- Born: 18 March 1926; Kalikapur, Faridpur, Bengal Province, British India
- Died: 14 March 2012 (aged 85); Kolkata, India
- Education: Vidyasagar College
- Occupations: Writer, journalist and cartoonist
- Spouse: Enakshi Goswami
- Parents: Parimal Goswami (father); Jyotsna Debi (mother)

Himanish Goswami (18 March 1926 – 14 March 2012) was an Indian writer, journalist, and cartoonist.

== Early life ==
Goswami was born at his maternal uncle's house on 18 March 1926 at Kalikapur in Faridpur District, British India (now Bangladesh). His father, Parimal Goswami, was a popular Bengali writer, newspaper editor, and photographer. Goswami's maternal grandfather was the Bengali poet Jatindra Nath Bagchi and his uncle, Jnanendra Nath Bagchi, wrote for several Bengali magazines. His family settled in Kolkata in 1937. His schooling was started at Rani Bhabani School at Sinthi. He matriculated from high school in 1944 and graduated from Vidysagar College under University of Calcutta in 1948.In 1951 he went to England to learn cartoon and drawing. He spent three years there.

== Career ==
After return from England in 1953, Goswami worked in various organizations, publication houses that include McGraw-Hill before taking a job with the Anandabazar Patrika newspaper. He was a journalist from 1972 to 1986. His use of humor is evident in such works as Kittu Lahiri & Bagha Kaka, Goenda De & Goenda Daa, Jeebram, Tetul Mama, and Maharaja Singh. In 2008, he held an exhibition of his photographs of London and Calcutta in Gaganendra Pradarshashala. In addition to the All India Honor in Children's Literature, he received the 'Oriental Art Center Award' (Prachyo Kalakendra Puraskaar) in 2001.

== Death ==
Goswami died on 14 March 2012 in a hospital in Kolkata after a long battle with prostate cancer.

== Bibliography ==
- Abhi-Dhanai-Panai (Gangchil)
- Apadartho (Pratikhon Publications)
- Bangla'r Sesh Detective
- Bhisan Bipod (Ananda Pub)
- Bhuban Charai Kalo Pecha
- Boro Gosai er Bandhubandhab (Ananda Pub)
- Buno Hase'r Sandhane (Ananda Pub)
- Daba Kemon Kore Khelte Hoi
- Hariye Jawa Ghora'r Gari (Karuna Prakashoni)
- Haste Haste (Punascha)
- Jeebram er Golpo (Surjyo/Lalmati)
- Kichu Bhuture Kichu Adbhuture
- Kittu Lahiri'r Teen Kirti (Ananda Pub)
- Kolkatar Saitan (Deys Publishing)
- Londoner Parai Parai
- Londoner Halchal
- Maharaja Singh The Great (Patra Bharati)
- Mojar Khela Daba (Ananda Pub)
- Sob Golpoi Moja'r [Editor] (Pratikhon Publications)
- Sob Golpoi Chore'r [Editor] (Pratikhon Publications)
- Sob Golpoi Jibjontu'r [Editor] (Pratikhon Publications)
- Sokti'r Songe Jholajhuli
- Tetul Mama'r Ajab Kandokarkhana (Pratikhon Publications)
