= Gian Nicola Babini =

Italian scientist (1944–2012)

- Born: 24 April 1944; Faenza, Italy
- Died: 11 March 2012 (aged 67); Faenza, Italy
- Education: University of Bologne
- Scientific career
- Fields: Ceramics, chemical, research

Gian Nicola Babini (24 April 1944 – 11 March 2012) was an Italian scientist who specialised in the field of ceramics.

== Biography ==
Babini graduated from the University of Bologna in industrial chemistry, and in 1975 he joined the Italian National Research Council (Consiglio Nazionale delle Ricerche) at the Institute of Science And Technology for Ceramics (ISTEC) as a researcher involved in the science and technology of oxide-based and non-oxide-based ceramics for structural, electric and biomedical applications.

On behalf of Tonito Emiliani, then ISTEC Director, he oversaw the improvement from Laboratory to Institute, which was opened in 1979 by Gaetano Quagliariello, the then CNR president. In 1985 Babini was made director of ISTEC, a position which he retained until 2008. As ISTEC Director, he urged research in traditional ceramics for building (raw materials, paints, plants, bricks, ceramic tiles, sanitary ware and so on) and art craft, with the objective of identifying the most appropriate methods in order to attain the best quality in the field.

Babini was also deeply involved in education and training at different levels. He promoted both vocational and post-graduate education and training in collaboration with the University of Bologna: presently a bachelor's degree in chemistry and technologies for the environment and materials is being offered at the Faenza Science and Technology Park.

Babini carried many initiatives aimed at promoting innovation and technology transfer and devising ways to create high tech partnerships and links with businesses and communities. Among his contributions, one of the most important was his involvement in the organisation of, as a chairman of the Special CNR Operative Unit for Technology Transfer, the Technology Transfer Days carried out in agreement with ACIMAC (Association of Italian suppliers of plant, machinery, equipment, semi-finished products, raw materials and services for the ceramic, heavy clay and refractories industries) and the establishing of the Evanelista Torricelli – Faventia technology incubation centre to link academia to industry. The centre bridges the gap between the two by following the idea of technology incubation.

His broad range of activity resulted in him publishing over 100 papers, in taking part in many popular/scientific meetings and events as a prominent expert and in granting patents for industrial applications.

From 2009, Babini contributed, in agreement with ECO SpA, to the improvement of the Italian certification system, as a member of ALPI (Association of Independent Test Laboratories and Certification Bodies) and president of the Department for Tests, Inspection, Assessment and Certification of Confindustria Innovative and Technological Services (CSIT), which is the department that gives a common voice to all Italian businesses dealing with technological innovation.

Also from 2009, Babini was president of CerInvest S.R.L., a limited company for the advancement of high tech ceramics and the construction products certification on behalf of ECO SpA, which later appointed him vice-president in 2010. In 2011 Babini was appointed chairman of I&C Consulting Ltd, an Italian-Chinese company of business services.

== List of positions ==
- Member of the CNR – APC – CNRSM Committee to create the ALKIMYA database
- President of the CNR – ENEA – APC Partnership Committee
- Member of the Scientific Council of ISRIM – Terni
- Member of the Italian MURST Ministry Committees for various projects
- Chairman of the Conference for the Faenza Science and Technology Park
- President of the First Italian Symposium on New Ceramics
- Scientific Consultant for the Italian MIUR Ministry for FAR, FIT and other National Plans projects
- Member of the IPI Commission for Industrial Promotion
- Organizer and Member of CER.NET
- Coordinator of the ACTA project for the national ceramic art craft advancement (2004 MAP Ministry project to establish 13 centres for ceramic art development all over Italy)
- President of the Italian Ceramic Society 1994–2000
- President of the European Ceramic Society 1993–1995 and 2001–2005
- Co-director of the Research Institute for Nano Science (RIN) – Kyoto Institute of Technology in Kyoto (Italian MAE Ministry special project) 2003-2005
- Member of the board of ASTER S.c.a.r.l. 2004-2007
- Chief executive officer of the ceramics consortium Agenzia Polo CeramicoScarl Faenza 2003–2008
- President of the International Ceramic Federation 2006-2008
- Organiser, assessor or head of several international research projects.
