= Renate Lenz-Fuchs =

Renate Lenz-Fuchs (born 19 April 1910 in Diez; died 23 June 2001 in Diez) was a German lawyer and honorary chairman of the German Lawyers' Association and founding member of the International Federation of Woman Lawyers (FIDA). Lenz-Fuchs was one of the first women to study law in Berlin, Königsberg and Bonn. During her work as a notary, she advocated equal rights for men and women, the revision of divorce law, guardianship and children's rights, and the reorganization of abortion.
