= Shao Xianghua =

Chinese materials engineer and metallurgist

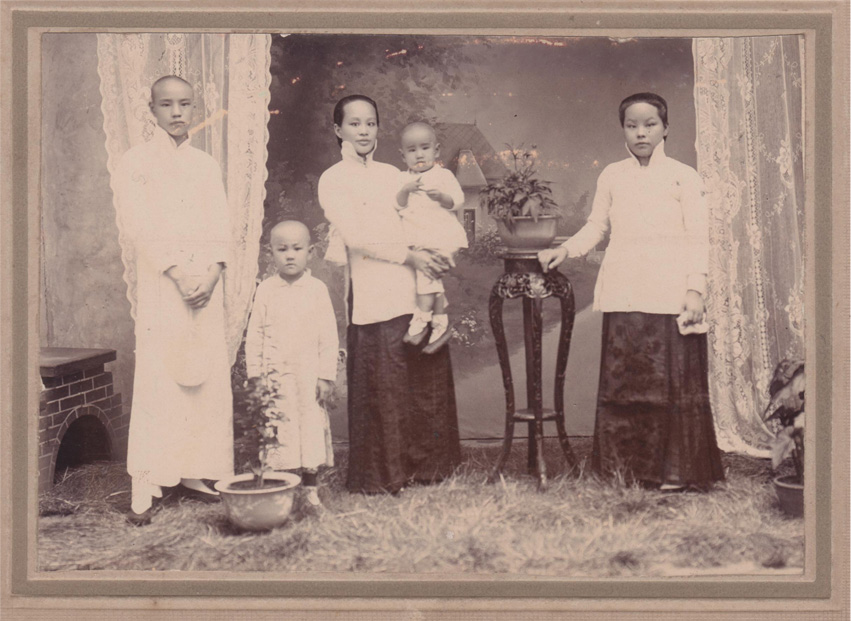

Shao Xianghua (simplified Chinese: 邵象华; traditional Chinese: 邵象華; pinyin: Shào Xiànghuá; February 22, 1913 – March 21, 2012) was a Chinese materials engineer and metallurgist. He was considered as a pioneer of modern Chinese metallurgical engineering.

== Career ==
Shao was born on February 22, 1913, in Hangzhou, Zhejiang Province. Shao graduated from the Department of Chemical Engineering, Zhejiang University in 1932. He studied in the Britain and received bachelor and M.Sc degrees from the University of London (current Imperial College London) in 1938.

1949, he became the Chief Engineer of the newly founded Anshan Iron and Steel Group, which is one of the most important steel producer in China. In 1958, he was transferred to the prestigious China Iron & Steel Research Institute (CISRI, 钢铁研究总院) and became a research fellow there.

Shao played an important role in both Chinese rare earths and rare metal industries. He was an academician of both the Chinese Academy of Sciences (1955 election) and the Chinese Academy of Engineering (1995 election), which is rare among Chinese scientists and engineers.
