= Donald Brown Engley =

American university librarian

Donald Brown Engley (July 19, 1917 - March 19, 2012) was an American university librarian, serving as librarian at Trinity College (Connecticut) from 1951 to 1972, and associate librarian of Yale University from 1972 to 1982. He received a B.A. from Amherst College and a M.L.S. degree from the Columbia University School of Library Service.

An active bibliophile, Engley was a member of the Acorn Club (to which he was elected in 1953), the Columbiad Club of Connecticut and the Grolier Club.

He served in the U.S. Army in WWII with the 79th Infantry Division. He received an honorary degree from Amherst in 1959. He was buried in Fairview Cemetery in West Hartford, Connecticut.
