= Gaston L'Heureux =

Canadian journalist and television host

Gaston L'Heureux (May 14, 1943 – January 9, 2011) was a Canadian journalist and television host.

L'Heureux was born in 1943 in Quebec City, Quebec and worked for the local newspaper Le Soleil in the early 1960s before becoming a freelance radio journalist. He hosted his first television program, Au masculin, in the early 1970s. After working for Télé-Québec and other outlets over the next decade, he moved to Radio-Canada in the 1980s and attained his greatest fame as the host of the popular program, Avis de recherche. His last regular involvement with a television program was in 2001, when he co-hosted series entitled, Josée, Gaston et cie. In addition to his career in media, L'Heureux was a prominent Quebec nationalist, serving for many years with the Société Saint-Jean-Baptiste in Montreal.

L'Heureux was left partly paralyzed by a serious automobile accident in 2007; after this time, he became a spokesperson for several organizations that provide services to persons with mobility issues. He died in hospital in January 2011, and several leading Quebec politicians, including Jean Charest and Gilles Duceppe, were among those who paid him tribute.
