= Robert Parke Cameron =

Canadian diplomat

Robert Cameron
- Born: Robert Parke Cameron; October 15, 1920; Montreal, Quebec, Canada
- Died: March 12, 2012 (aged 91); Ottawa, Ontario, Canada
- Occupation: Diplomat
- Spouse: Isobel Whiteley (m.1948-death)
- Children: Bruce, Brian and Lesley

Robert Cameron (1920-2012) was a Canadian diplomat. While working with the Canadian Department of External Affairs he served as the Director-General of International Security Affairs, and as a representative of the department on the Canada-U.S. Permanent Joint Board on Defence. Cameron served as the ambassador to Yugoslavia between 1974-1977, and Poland between 1978-1980.
