= Granville Semmes =

Granville Martin Semmes II (April 3, 1927 – March 30, 2012) was an American businessman, entrepreneur and gemcutter. Semmes was the founder of 1-800-Flowers, a floral retailer, gift and distribution company in the United States.

== Biography ==
He was born on April 3, 1927, in Memphis, Tennessee, to Benedict Joseph Semmes and Amy Elizabeth Lardner.

He earned a bachelor's degree from Duke University. Semmes served in the United States Navy before moving to New Orleans, Louisiana, in 1949. Semmes first worked at Whitney National Bank. He then joined the staff of WWL-TV as an advertising account executive, where he worked for thirty years.

Semmes is best known as the founder of 1-800-Flowers, a telephone business which allowed consumers to order flowers using a credit card without having to visit a florist. Semmes came up with the idea for the business while taking a shower. He was friends with both a florist and an executive for a telephone company. Unfortunately for Semmes, the telephone number for his proposed 1-800-Flowers was owned by a truck driver who lived in Wisconsin at the time. Semmes flew to Wisconsin, where he purchased the phone number. In addition to 1-800-Flowers, which Semmes launched in the 1980s, the company has expanded to the Internet with 1-800-Flowers.com.

Semmes' personal interests included historic preservation, gemstones, woodworking and tennis. Semmes and his son purchased five historic homes, built before the Civil War, in the Irish Channel neighborhood of New Orleans during the 1970s. The five homes, located on First Street, included three of the last five remaining brick double homes in New Orleans. Semmes restored all five homes, and later purchased the remainder of the buildings on the same city block.

Semmes also had interests in gemstones and gemology. He owned two jewelry stores, called Chatelaine Fine Gems, with branches in the Royal Orleans and the Royal Sonesta hotels in New Orleans. Additionally, Semmes worked as a gem appraiser and a master gemcutter, achieving the title of fellow from the Gemological Institute of Great Britain.

Semmes died at the Touro Infirmary in New Orleans on March 30, 2012, aged 84. He was survived by his wife, Jane (née Pfister) Semmes; two daughters and six sons, and a large extended family.
