= Erkki Nordberg =

M.A. Erkki Juhani Nordberg (17 August 1946, Helsinki – 28 March 2012, Helsinki) was a Finnish colonel who served as the Chief of the Educational Department of the Main Headquarters of the Finnish Defense Forces.

Before that, Nordberg served in the Finnish Defense Forces as the commander of the Brigade of Karelia from 1999 to 2002.

In his educational work, Nordberg focused foremost on the history of the Finnish wars during World War II and he has researched extensively the war plans of the Soviet Union, related to World War II. He authored and co-authored several books and he wrote numerous columns for various newspapers – nearly all on military-and war-related issues.

In additions to his publishing and educational work, the general public got to know Nordberg as a regular war correspondent on the Finnish television and radio channels, e.g. during the Persian Gulf War and the Yugoslav Wars.

In his book, Arvio ja ennuste Venäjän sotilaspolitiikasta Suomen suunnalla of 2003 ("The Analysis and Prognosis of the Russian Military Politics on the Finnish Front"), Colonel Nordberg explains in detail why and how the Soviet Union planned and intended to invade Finland, following the Winter War (1939–1940).

== Works ==
- Arvio ja ennuste Venäjän sotilaspolitiikasta Suomen suunnalla [Finnish: The Analysis and Prognosis of the Soviet Military Politics on the Finnish Front.] Art House, Helsinki 2003. ISBN 951-884-362-7
- Suomi, EU, Nato ja Venäjä. Art House, Helsinki 2004. ISBN 951-884-387-2
- Kriisi!: Pienet valtiot kansainvälisissä ja ulkopoliittisissa kriiseissä. Suomen Mies, 1990. ISBN 951-95800-1-8
- Islamistinen terrorismi ja sen vastainen puolustus. Art House, Helsinki 2007. ISBN 978-951-884-418-4
