= Dhaval Dhairyawan =

Indian photojournalist (1979–2012)

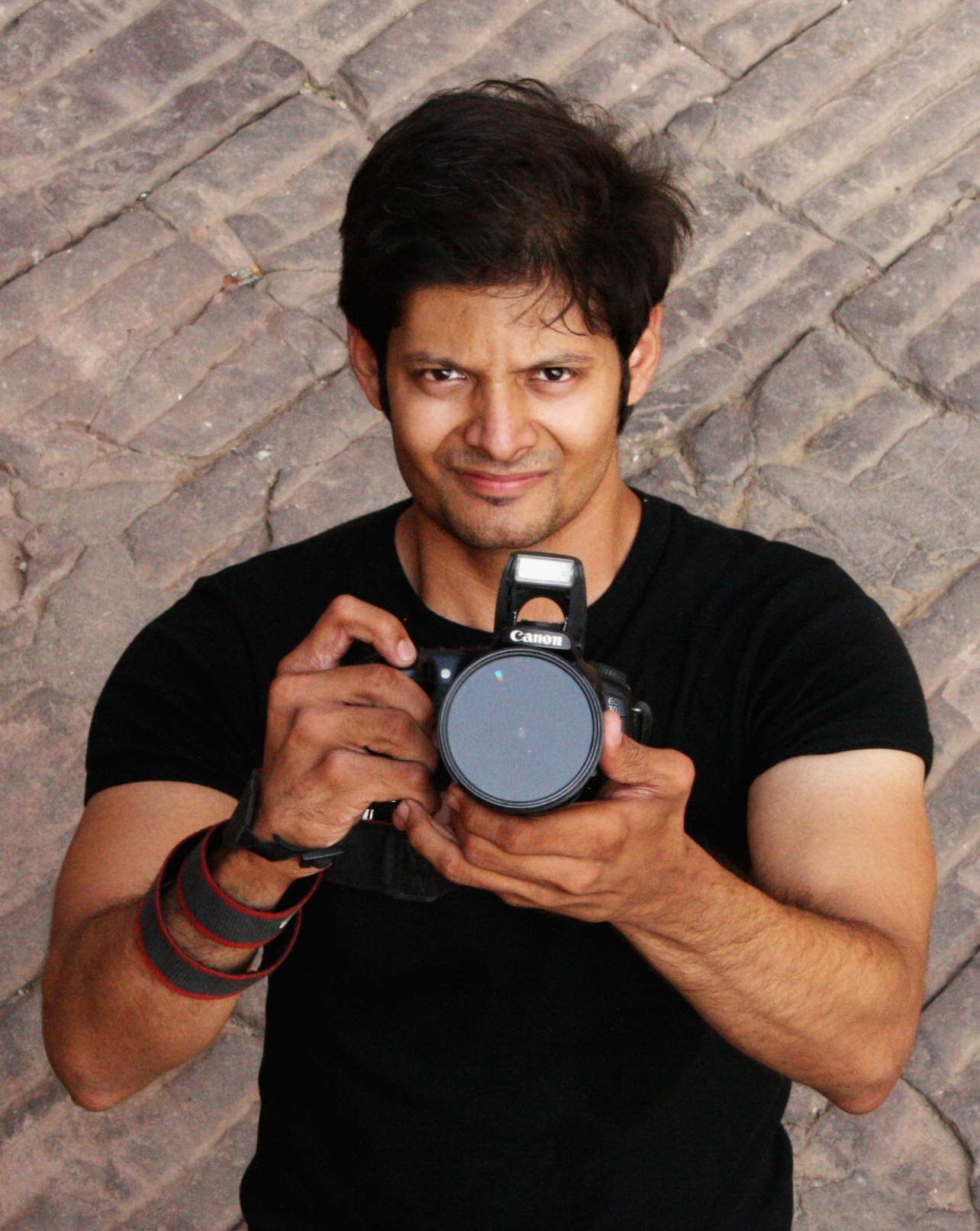
- Born: Dhaval Sunil Dhairyawan; 19 April 1979; Mumbai, Maharashtra, India
- Died: 22 March 2012 (aged 32); Mumbai, Maharashtra, India
- Occupation: Photographer
- Years active: 2005–2012
- Website: Official Flickr Website

Dhaval Sunil Dhairyawan (19 April 1979 – 22 March 2012) was a lifestyle and automotive photographer from India. He was noted for his photojournalism for The Times Journal of Photography, TopGear India, The Times of India, and Lonely Planet.

Mumbai-based Piramal Art Gallery hosted a photo exhibition in his memory under the name, The Dhaval Dhairyawan Retrospective.

Due to his passion for automobiles, he changed the Indian outlook for automotive photography. He did several photoshoots for Top Gear which were never seen in an Indian car magazine before.

== Death ==
Dhairyawan died on 22 March 2012 due to a prolonged illness.
