= María Teresa López Beltrán =

Spanish historian (1950–2012)

- Born: 13 June 1950; Tétouan, Spanish protectorate in Morocco
- Died: 11 March 2012 (aged 61); Málaga, Spain
- Education: University of Granada
- Occupation: Academic
- Employer: University of Málaga
- Notable work: La prostitución en el reino de Granada en época de los Reyes Católicos

María Teresa López Beltrán (13 June 1950 – 11 March 2012) was a Spanish historian and medievalist, a professor at the University of Málaga.

== Biography ==
Born in Tétouan on 13 June 1950, her family soon moved to Santa Cruz de Tenerife. There she earned a licentiate in geography and history at the University of La Laguna, publishing her thesis Régimen jurídico de los molinos en el Valle del Ebro (Jurisdiction of the Mills in the Ebro Valley). In 1973 she began working at the University of Granada, where she was an assistant professor of legal history for three academic years, and started a thesis on poverty in legal regulations in modern Spain, which she never completed.

In 1976 she arrived at the University of Málaga (UMA), being hired for a year as an assistant professor of the Department of Ancient History, and in 1978 she joined the Medieval Department, publishing her thesis El puerto de Málaga en la transición a los tiempos modernos (The Port of Málaga in the Transition to Modern Times). She received her title as an associate professor in 1988. In her 35 years as a professor and researcher, she was considered one of the most knowledgeable academics on women and sexuality in the Middle Ages, as evidenced by her best-known work, La prostitución en el reino de Granada en época de los Reyes Católicos (Prostitution in the Kingdom of Granada in the Time of the Catholic Monarchs).

A noted authority on medieval women, she published several articles on childhood, education, employment, sexuality, and the repopulation of the Kingdom of Granada, which led to changes in the field and a new vision of women's work in late medieval cities. She was a founding member and a director of the UMA's Association of Women's Studies, established in 1985. In addition, she taught courses in Zaragoza, Jaén, Cádiz, and Argentina.

Her studies were not only based on the fields of women and sexuality; she also explored the areas of the New Christians and of commerce. Through her research, she found a document in the Biblioteca Nacional de España that spoke about the mythical country of Cockaigne (Spanish: Cucaña). This was the first known mention of that country in Spain.

María Teresa López Beltrán died suddenly on 11 March 2012, while working on a book titled Judeoconversos y reconciliados en Málaga y su obispado a finales de la Edad Media (Jewish Converts and Reconciled in Málaga and its Bishopric in the Late Middle Ages).

== Selected publications ==
- La Prostitución en el Reino de Granada en la época de los Reyes Católicos: el caso de Málaga (1487–1516) [Prostitution in the Kingdom of Granada in the Time of the Catholic Monarchs: The Case of Málaga (1487–1516)]. Provincial Deputation of Málaga. 1985. ISBN 8450522188.
- "Pervivencia hispánica de un mito medieval: un poema anónimo sobre el reino de Cucaña" [Hispanic Prevalence of a Medieval Myth: An Anonymous Poem About the Kingdom of Cockaigne]. Analecta Malacitana. 8 (2): 223–36. 1985. ISSN 0211-934X.
- El puerto de Málaga en la transición a los tiempos modernos [The Port of Málaga in the Transition to Modern Times]. University of Málaga. 1986. ISBN 8474961238.
- Educación, instrucción y alfabetización en la sociedad urbana malagueña a finales de la Edad Media y principios de la Edad Moderna [Education, Instruction, and Alphabetization in Málaga Urban Society in the Late Middle Ages and Early Modern Age]. University of Málaga. 1997. ISBN 8474966671.
- "Financiación de los viajes y cobertura de los riesgos en el tráfico marítimo mala-gueño en época de los Reyes Católicos" [Financing of Travel and Coverage of Risks in Málaga Maritime Traffic at the Time of the Catholic Monarchs]. Baética: Estudios de arte, geografía e historia (21): 281–300. 1999. ISSN 0212-5099.
- La prostitución en el Reino de Granada a finales de la Edad Media [Prostitution in the Kingdom of Granada in the Late Middle Ages]. Provincial Deputation of Málaga. 2003. ISBN 8477854106.
- Historia y Género: Imágenes y vivencias de las mujeres en España y América [History and Gender: Images and Experiences of Women in Spain and America]. University of Málaga. 2007. ISBN 9788497471923.
