= Bernard Zadi Zaourou =

Ivorian politician

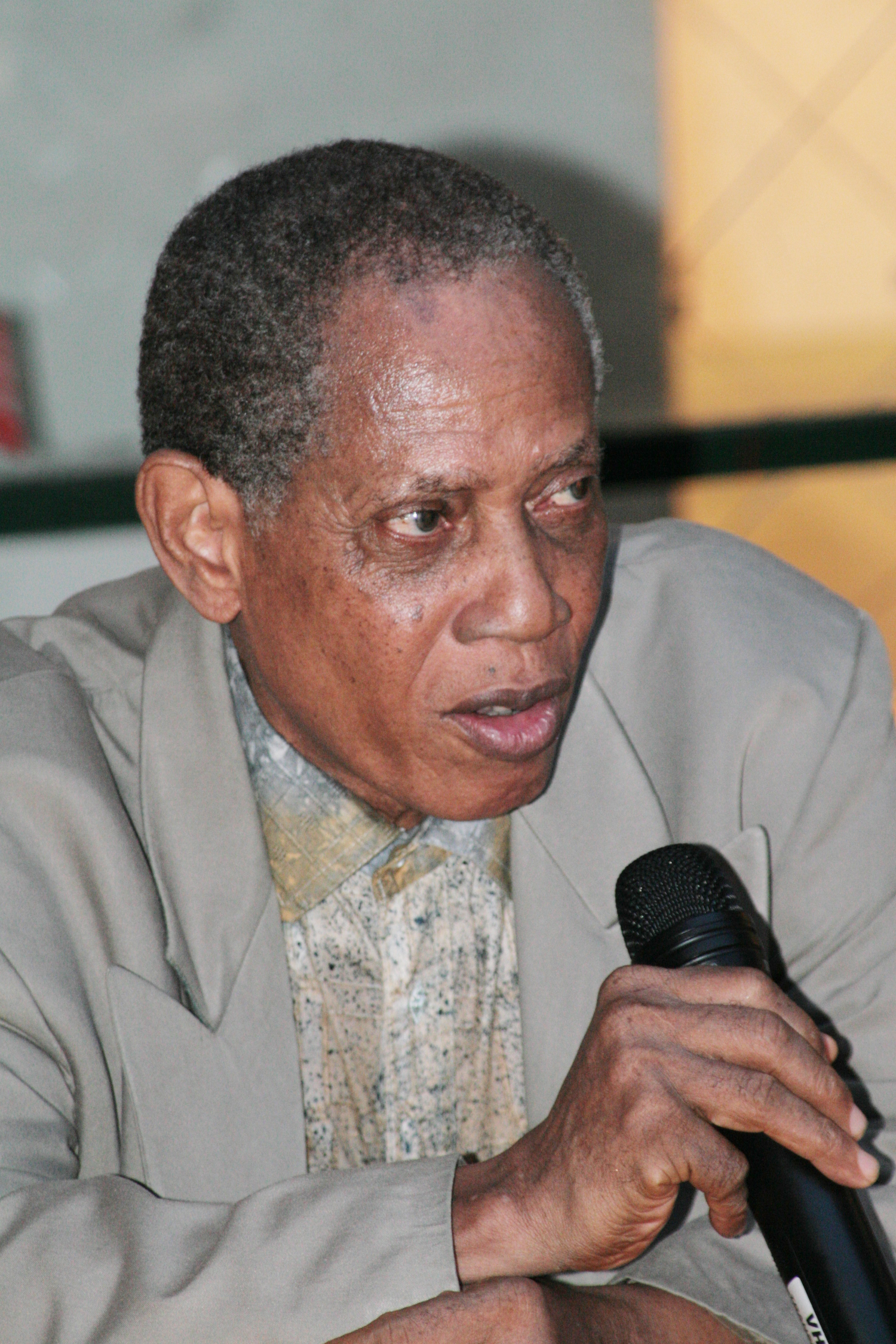
Bernard Zadi Zaourou, Ivorian politician and writer (2009)

Bernard Zadi Zaourou or Bottey Zadi Zaourou (1938 – 20 March 2012) was an Ivorian politician, teacher and writer, minister of culture with Daniel Kablan Duncan in 1993.

Zaourou was born in Soubré. He was considered as a feminist writer and the theoriser of "DIDIGA" aesthetics

== Books ==
- Fer de lance, livre I, 1975
- Césarienne (Fer de lance, livre II)
- Aube prochaine
- Les chants du souvenir

== Theatre ==
- 1968 : Sorry Lombe
- 1974 : Les sofas et L'œil
- 1979 : La tignasse
- 1981 : La termitière
- 1984 : Le secret des dieux
- 1984 : Le Didiga de Dizo
- 1985 : La guerre des femmes
