= Douglas L. Mills =

American physicist and writer

- Born: Douglas Leon Mills; April 2, 1940; Berkeley, California, U.S.
- Died: March 29, 2012 (aged 71); Duarte, California, U.S.
- Education: University of California, Berkeley
- Occupations: Physicist, writer

Douglas Leon Mills (April 2, 1940 – March 29, 2012) was an American physicist and writer.

== Life and career ==
Mills as born in Berkeley, California. He attended the University of California, Berkeley, earning his BS degree in engineering physics in 1961 and his PhD degree in physics in 1965. After earning his degrees, he worked as a postdoctoral fellow at Paris-Sud University in Orsay.

Mills served as a professor in the department of physics at the University of California, Irvine from 1966 to 2010. During his years as a professor, in 1972, he was named a fellow of the American Physical Society, and in 1991, he wrote the book Nonlinear Optics: Basic Concepts, published by Springer-Velag.

== Death ==
Mills died on March 29, 2012, in Duarte, California, at the age of 71.
