= Frank H. Strickler =

American defense lawyer

- Born: Frank Hunter Strickler; January 20, 1920; Washington
- Died: March 29, 2012 (aged 92); Chevy Chase, Maryland, U.S.
- Education: George Washington University
- Occupation: Defense lawyer
- Spouse: Ellis Barnard

Frank Hunter Strickler (January 20, 1920 – March 29, 2012) was an American defense lawyer. He was perhaps best known for defending H. R. Haldeman and John Ehrlichman during the Watergate trials.

== Life and career ==
Strickler was born in Washington. He attended George Washington University and while he attended, he worked as a fingerprint examiner for the FBI to help pay for his education. He earned an undergraduate degree and a law degree.

Strickler served as an assistant United States attorney from October 1949, until he resigned in 1956 to enter private law practice.

Strickler died on March 29, 2012, at his home in Chevy Chase, Maryland, at the age of 92.
