= Catherine Mavriplis =

Canadian mechanical engineer

Catherine Mavriplis is a Canadian mechanical engineer specializing in computational fluid dynamics for applications in aerodynamics. She is a professor of mechanical engineering at the University of Ottawa. She also maintains an interest in women in STEM, is the former holder of the NSERC Chair for Women in Science and Engineering, and holds a cross appointment in the University of Ottawa Faculty of Education.

== Education and career ==
Mavriplis was inspired to go into mechanical engineering through her father, Greek Olympian skier Fotis Mavriplis, who became an engineer for Canadair and for Bombardier Inc. She graduated from McGill University in 1983 with a bachelor's degree in mechanical engineering. She completed a Ph.D. in 1986 in aeronautics and astronautics at the Massachusetts Institute of Technology, with the dissertation Nonconforming Discretizations and A Posteriori Error Estimators for Adaptive Spectral Element Techniques supervised by Anthony Patera. She writes that Yvon Maday was "also heavily involved" in supervising her doctoral research.

Next, she became a postdoctoral researcher at Princeton University, working there with Steven Orszag. In 1991 she took a faculty position at George Washington University. Subsequently, she worked as a program director for the Division of Mathematical Sciences at the National Science Foundation, as a researcher in the National Severe Storms Laboratory at the University of Oklahoma, and at NASA Langley, before returning to Canada in 2008 and taking her present position at the University of Ottawa. There, she was NSERC Chair for Women in Science and Engineering from 2011 to 2021.

== Recognition ==
Mavriplis was the 2021 recipient of the Award for the Support of Women in the Engineering Profession of Engineers Canada. In 2021, she also became a Fellow of Engineers Canada, and a Fellow of the Canadian Academy of Engineering.
