= Mortimer H. Appley =

American psychologist and academic administrator

Mortimer Appley
- Born: Mortimer Herbert Appley; November 21, 1921
- Died: March 29, 2012 (aged 90); Chestnut Hill, Massachusetts, U.S.
- Education: City College of New York; University of Denver; University of Michigan
- Spouse: Mariann Appley
- Children: 2
- Scientific career
- Fields: Psychology
- Institutions: Clark University

Mortimer Herbert Appley (November 21, 1921 – March 29, 2012) was an American psychologist and academic administrator.

== Career ==
He became the chair of the psychology department at Connecticut College for Women in 1952. He went on to hold leadership roles at several other universities over the next two decades, including York University, where he founded and chaired the psychology department. In 1974, he became the sixth president of Clark University, a position he held for ten years; he has been credited with leading Clark out of significant fiscal difficulties during his tenure. He then left Clark to join Harvard University in 1984, first as a visiting scholar and later as a visiting professor.
