= Fotis Mavriplis =

Greek alpine skier (1920–2012)

Personal information
- Nationality: Greek
- Born: 31 January 1920; Thessaloniki, Greece
- Died: 9 March 2012 (aged 92); Montreal, Quebec, Canada

Sport
- Sport: Alpine skiing

Fotis Mavriplis (Φώτης Μαυρίπλης, 31 January 1920 – 9 March 2012) was a Greek skier who competed in alpine skiing at the 1948 Winter Olympics, and who later worked as an aircraft engineer in Canada.

== Early life and skiing career ==
Mavriplis was born in Thessaloniki on 31 January 1920. As a teenager, he carried the 1936 Olympic torch through Thessaloniki, and attended the 1936 Olympic Games in Berlin.

In the late 1930s he studied aeronautical engineering at the Technical University of Munich, and after finishing his studies he continued to work in Germany as an engineer. It was in this time that he began skiing regularly, in St Anton am Arlberg, and towards the end of World War II he moved to St Anton.

He competed in two events at the 1948 Winter Olympics. He was the only competitor for Greece at the 1948 Winter Olympics, and was its flagbearer. He did not place well, finishing 101st in the downhill skiing event (second to last among competitors who finished the course) and failing to finish in the combined skiing event. Nevertheless, he maintained a lifelong love of the sport, continuing to ski until his last run in 2004 at the age of 84.

== Engineering career ==
After working briefly as an engineer in France, Mavriplis emigrated to Canada in 1951, initially working for an engineering consulting firm in Toronto but soon moving to Montreal to work for Canadair. When Canadair began collaborating with Bill Lear in the mid-1970s, on the business jet line that would eventually become the Bombardier Challenger, Mavriplis became chief aerodynamics designer for the line. He continued to work for Bombardier Inc. after it acquired Canadair in 1986. He retired in 2001.

Mavriplis was named as a Fellow of the Canadian Aeronautics and Space Institute in 1980. He was the 1998 recipient of the CASI McCurdy Award for outstanding achievements in the science and creative aspects of engineering relating to aeronautics and space research. In 2000 he was "recognized for his long-term contributions to aerospace in Canada" and selected as the W. Rupert Turnbull Lecturer of the Canadian Aeronautics and Space Institute, and in 2002 he was the John J. Green Lecturer at the 23rd Congress of the International Council of the Aeronautical Sciences.

== Family and later life ==
Mavriplis married Linda Calder in 1955; they had three children. Their daughter, Catherine Mavriplis, became a professor of aerospace and mechanical engineering, as did their son Dimitri. Mavriplis died on 9 March, 2012, in Montreal.
