= Eileen McDonough =

American actress

- McDonough in a 1975 episode of Gunsmoke
- Born: May 20, 1962; Philadelphia, Pennsylvania, U.S.
- Died: March 13, 2012 (aged 49); Van Nuys, California, U.S.
- Occupation: Actress
- Years active: 1974–1977

Eileen McDonough (May 20, 1962 – March 13, 2012) was an American former child actress, best known for appearing on various television series including The Mary Tyler Moore Show, Gunsmoke, The Waltons, and Apple's Way.

She was born in Philadelphia, Pennsylvania, to parents Joe and Loretta McDonough.

She died on March 13, 2012, in Van Nuys, California, aged 49.
