= Thomas J. Lydon =

American judge (1927–2012)

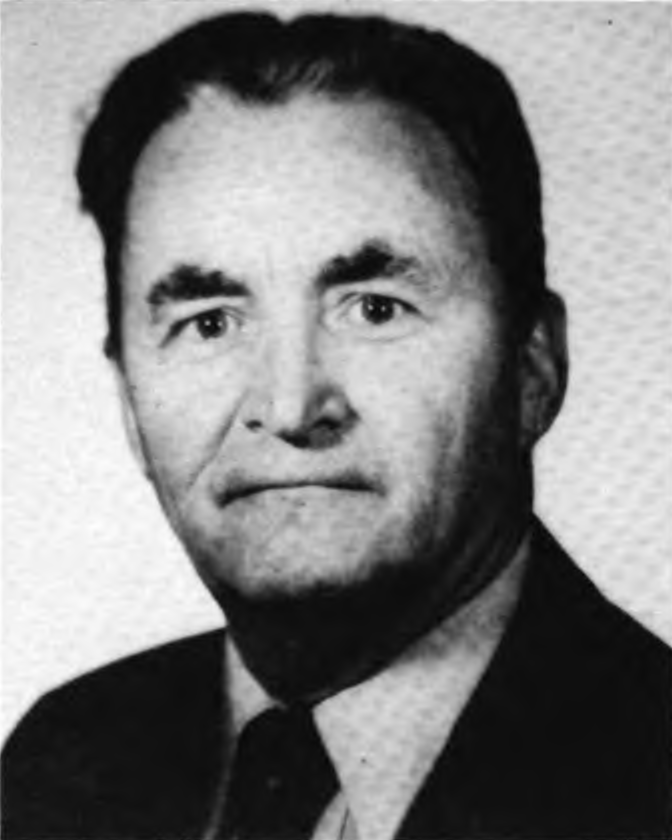

Judge of the United States Court of Federal Claims
- In office October 1, 1982 – July 31, 1987
- Appointed by: operation of law
- Preceded by: seat established
- Succeeded by: Roger Andewelt

Personal details
- Born: June 3, 1927 Portland, Maine, U.S.
- Died: March 1, 2012 (aged 84) Rockville, Maryland, U.S.
- Education: University of Maine (BA); Georgetown University (LLB, LLM)

Thomas J. Lydon (June 3, 1927 – March 1, 2012) was an American lawyer who served as a judge of the United States Court of Federal Claims from 1982 to 1987.

Born in Portland, Maine, Lydon served in the United States Navy in 1945–1946. He then graduated from University of Maine and received his law degree from Georgetown University. Lydon was a trial judge for the United States Court of Claims from 1972 to 1982. In 1982, Lydon was reassigned by operation of law to the United States Court of Federal Claims.
