= Lenz (surname) =

Lenz is a German surname.

Notable people with the name include:

== Arts and entertainment ==
- Alev Lenz (born 1982), German-Turkish singer/songwriter
- Bethany Joy Lenz-Galeotti (born 1981), American television actress
- David Lenz (born 1962), American portrait painter
- Desiderius Lenz (1832–1928), German artist, Benedictine monk, co-founder of the Beuron Art School
- Fabian Lenz, German DJ, techno musician and events producer
- Frank Lenz (born 1967), drummer from Southern California who has done work for many bands and artists
- Frederick Lenz (1950–1998), American author and Buddhist spiritual guru
- Hermann Lenz, German writer of poetry, fiction stories, and novels
- Gita Lenz (1910–2011), New York photographer
- Günter Lenz (1938–2026), German jazz bassist and composer
- Jack Lenz, Canadian Bahá'í composer
- Jakob Lenz (opera), a one act chamber opera by Wolfgang Rihm
- Jakob Michael Reinhold Lenz (1751–1792), German writer of the Sturm und Drang movement
- Kay Lenz (born 1953), Emmy Award-winning American television and film actress
- Klára Lenz (1924–2013), Hungarian tapestry artist
- Marlene Lenz (born 1932), German politician
- Maximilian Lenz (1860–1948), Austrian artist
- Maximilian Lenz (born 1965) alias WestBam, German DJ and techno musician
- Nicole Marie Lenz (born 1980), actress
- Pedro Lenz (born 1965), Swiss writer, expert of Spanish literature
- Rick Lenz (born 1939), American actor, author and playwright
- Rudolf Lenz (1920–1987), Austrian actor
- Sidney Lenz (1873–1960), American contract bridge player and writer
- Siegfried Lenz (1926–2014), German writer
- Uli Lenz (born 1955), German composer, pianist, and producer in the modern jazz genre
- Wilhelm von Lenz (1809–1883), Baltic German Russian official and writer

== Sports ==
- André Lenz, retired German football goalkeeper
- August Lenz, German international footballer
- Cajetan Lenz (born 2006), German footballer
- Christopher Lenz, German footballer who plays as a defender
- Consetta Caruccio-Lenz (1918–1980), American gymnast
- David Lenz, German Major League Baseball player
- Frank Lenz (cyclist) (1867 – probably 1894), American bicyclist and adventurer who disappeared somewhere near Erzurum, Turkey
- Gene Lenz, American competition swimmer
- Jörn Lenz, German former footballer who played as a defender
- Josef Lenz, West German luger
- Josh Lenz (born 1990), American football wide receiver
- Julian Lenz, German tennis player
- Manuel Lenz (born 1984), German footballer
- Marcel Lenz (disambiguation), several people
- Peter Lenz (1997–2010), American motorcycle road racer
- Sandy Lenz, American figure skater

== Science and academia ==
- Fritz Lenz (1887–1976), German anthropologist and eugenicist
- Emil Lenz (1804–1865), German and Russian physicist

- Hanfried Lenz (1916–2013), German mathematician
- Maurice Lenz (1890–1974), Russian pioneer in the field of radiation therapy
- Max Lenz (1850–1931), German historian
- Oskar Lenz (1848–1925), a German-Austrian geologist and mineralogist
- Renate Lenz-Fuchs (1910–2011), German lawyer and honorary chairman of the German Lawyer's Association
- Widukind Lenz (1919–1995), German pediatrician

- Widukind Lenz (1919–195), German pediatrician, medical geneticist and dysmorphologist
- Wilhelm Lenz (1888–1957), German physicist

== Politician ==
- Aloys Lenz (politician, born 1910) (1910–1976), German politician
- Andreas Lenz (born 1981), German politician
- Carl Otto Lenz (born 1930), German lawyer, member of the German Bundestag
- Karl Lenz (1899–1944), German politician
- Otto Lenz (1903–1957), German politician (CDU), Head of the Chancellery (1951-53), member of the German Bundestag
- Tomasz Lenz (born 1968), Polish politician

== Other ==
- Dolly Lenz (born 1957), real estate agent in New York City
- Stephanie Lenz, plaintiff in Lenz v. Universal Music Corp. who posted a YouTube video of children dancing to a Prince song
- Hermann-Lenz-Preis, a literary prize of Germany
- Hester-Lenz House, a historic house in Benton, Arkansas
- Lenz Field, privately owned multi-field baseball and softball complex in Jacksonville, Illinois

=== Fictional people ===
- Billy Lenz, a character in the 2006 remake of Black Christmas
- Randy Lenz, in the 1996 novel Infinite Jest by David Foster Wallace

== See also ==
- Lenz, Oregon (disambiguation)
- Maximilian Lenz (disambiguation)
