= Lenz =

Lenz may refer to:

== Places ==
- Lenz, Gauteng or Lenasia, a township in Gauteng Province, South Africa
- Lantsch/Lenz, a municipality, Canton of Grisons, Switzerland
- Lenz, Hood River County, Oregon, an unincorporated community, US
- Lenz, Klamath County, Oregon, an unincorporated community, US
- Lenz Island, Saskatchewan, Canada
- Lents (crater) or Lenz, a lunar crater

== Other uses ==
- Lenz (surname), including a list of people with the name
- Lenz (fragment), literary fragment by Georg Büchner
- Lenz Field, former name of a baseball and softball complex in Jacksonville, Illinois, US
- Lenz's law, in field electromagnetism
- Lenz (1971 film), a West German drama film
- Lenz (2006 film), a Swiss film

== See also ==
- Lentz, a surname
- Cenani–Lenz syndactylism, congenital malformation syndrome
- Lenz microphthalmia syndrome, a rare inherited disorder
- Laplace–Runge–Lenz vector, a vector in classical mechanics
