= Lentz =

Lentz is a Germanic surname.

== People ==
Notable people with the surname include:

- Bryan Lentz (born 1964), attorney and former Pennsylvania legislator
- Carl Lentz American pastor, former lead pastor of Hillsong Church NYC
- Daniel Lentz (born 1942), American composer
- Georges Lentz (born 1965), Luxembourgish/Australian composer
- Hugo Lentz, (1859–1944), Austrian mechanical engineer and inventor
- Jim Lentz (born c. 1955), CEO of Toyota Motor North America
- Matt Lentz (born 1982), American football player
- Michael Lentz (born 1964), German writer and musician
- Michel Lentz (1820–1893), Luxembourgish poet
- Nic Lentz (born 1989), professional baseball umpire
- Nik Lentz (born 1984), American mixed martial artist
- Owen Lentz (born 1980), American rugby union footballer
- Paul Lentz, American politician
- Ruediger Lentz (born 1947), German journalist
- Stanislaw Lentz (1861–1920), Polish painter

== Places ==
- Lentz–Carter Merchandise Store, American historic building and general store in Stella, Newton County, Missouri, U.S.
- Lentz Center for Asian Culture, Lincoln, Nebraska, U.S., part of University of Nebraska-Lincoln
- Lentz Hotel, historical building, first commercial building in Cabarrus County, North Carolina, U.S.
- Lentz House (Hotel Sheller), historic hotel in North Manchester, Wabash County, Indiana, U.S.

== See also ==
- Lenz (disambiguation)
- Lintz (disambiguation)
