= Turgay Tapu =

German footballer

Personal information
- Date of birth: April 29, 1982 (age 44)
- Height: 1.83 m (6 ft 0 in)
- Position: Goalkeeper

Team information
- Current team: Rot Weiss Ahlen
- Number: 1

Youth career
- Rot Weiss Ahlen

Senior career*
Years	Team	Apps	(Gls)
2004–2009	Rot Weiss Ahlen II	64	(0)
2008–2009	Rot Weiss Ahlen	1	(0)
2009–2011	SC Roland Beckum		
2011–03/2013	Rot Weiss Ahlen	13	(0)
- * Club domestic league appearances and goals as of June 2012

Turgay Tapu (born April 29, 1982) is a German football player, who played for Rot Weiss Ahlen and SC Roland Beckum.

Tapu was part of the reserve team of RW Ahlen from 2004 until 2008 after which he joined the main team. In 2008, he had three appearances in the 2.Bundesliga after the first goalkeeper of the team, Manuel Lenz, was given a red card causing a two match suspension.

In 2009, Turgay Tapu became part of SC Roland Beckum where he stayed until 2011. In 2011, he went back to his former team RW Ahlen where he played until March 2013. His contract was terminated because of continuing differences with his coach Marco Antwerpen.
