= Maximilian Lenz (disambiguation) =

Maximilian Lenz may refer to:

- Maximilian Lenz (1860–1948), Austrian artist
- WestBam (1965–), real name Maximilian Lenz, German musician

== See also ==
- Max Lenz (1850–1931), German historian
