= Lintz (disambiguation) =

Lintz is a small village in County Durham, England.

Lintz may also refer to:

People

- Gertrude Davies Lintz (died 1968), English-American socialite, dog breeder, and keeper of exotic animals
- Larry Lintz (born 1949), American professional baseball player
- Matt Lintz (born 2001), American actor

Places

- Lintz Green railway station, station on the Derwent Valley Railway in County Durham, England
- Lintz Addition, West Virginia, unincorporated community in Logan County, West Virginia

== See also ==
- Linz (disambiguation)
- Lentz (disambiguation)
