= SS Cuxhaven =

A number of steamships have been named Cuxhaven, including:-

- SS Cuxhaven (1864), a HAPAG ship in service 1866–1886
- SS Cuxhaven (1882), a cargo ship
- SS Cuxhaven (1943), a HAPAG ship in service September–October 1943
