= Theodore K. Lawless =

American dermatologist (1892–1971)

- Born: Theodore Kenneth Lawless; December 6, 1892; Thibodeaux, Louisiana
- Died: May 1, 1971 (aged 78); Chicago, Illinois
- Education: Talladega College (A.B., 1914); University of Kansas; Northwestern University (MD, 1919; MS, 1920)
- Occupation: Dermatologist
- Years active: 1924–1971
- Medical career
- Field: Dermatology
- Sub-specialties: skin specialist; leprosy and syphilis
- Awards: Spingarn Medal (1954)

Theodore Kenneth (T. K.) Lawless (December 6, 1892 – May 1, 1971) was an American dermatologist, medical researcher, and philanthropist. He was a skin specialist, and is known for work related to leprosy and syphilis.

Lawless was also involved in various charitable causes, including Jewish causes. Related to the latter, he created the Lawless Department of Dermatology in Beilinson Hospital, Tel Aviv, Israel. He received his M.D. degree from Northwestern University Medical School, and was a self-made millionaire. In 1954, he won the NAACP Spingarn Medal, presented annually to an African American of distinguished achievement.

== Early life ==
Lawless was born December 6, 1892, in Thibodeaux, Louisiana, to Alfred Lawless Jr., (a Congregational minister, instructor at Straight University, and American Missionary Association district superintendent of churches) and Harriet Dunn Lawless (a school teacher). Soon after his birth, his father moved the family to New Orleans, Louisiana. He earned $1-a-day as a boy in his first job, in a New Orleans market.

== Education ==
Lawless attended Straight College (now, Dillard University) in New Orleans for secondary school and went from there to Talladega College in Alabama where he received an A.B. in 1914. He then attended the University of Kansas School of Medicine and Northwestern University Medical School in Chicago, from which he received his MD in 1919 and an MS in 1920.

In 1920 he was named a Rosenwald Fellow in Medicine—an award targeting top black medical students—and thereby received $1,200 ($19,000 in current dollar terms). Lawless engaged in graduate studies at the Vanderbilt Clinic of Columbia Medical School and at Harvard Medical School. He held a fellowship at Massachusetts General Hospital. He received further postgraduate training outside the United States at the University of Paris's premier dermatology program at L'Hôpital St. Louis, as well as at the University of Freiburg in Germany, and the University of Vienna in Austria. He noted later that "it was a noteworthy fact in my own life experience that of the twelve letters [of recommendation for study abroad] that I received, eleven were from Jewish physicians."

== Career ==
After graduating in 1924, Lawless returned to Chicago to open his dermatology practice on Chicago's South Side in a poor, black neighborhood. He became an instructor and research fellow at Northwestern University Medical School the same year, and taught there as a professor of dermatology and syphilology until 1941. He helped establish the university's first medical laboratories, and established the first clinical laboratory for dermatology.

Lawless performed research on syphilis, leprosy, sporotrichosis, and other skin diseases. In 1936, he helped devise a new treatment for early stage syphilis (electropyrexia, which artificially raised a patient's temperature, and then injected the patient with therapeutic drugs). He also developed special treatments for skin damaged by arsenical preparations, which were commonly used during the 1920s against syphilis, and was one of the first doctors to use radium to treat cancer. Between 1921 and 1941 he published ten papers on dermatology, which including studies on warts, sporotrichosis, the use of colloidal mercuric sulphide, arsenicals, the treatment of early syphilis with electrically induced fever, tinea sycosis of the upper lip, tularemia, and congenital ichthyosiform erythroderma.

In 1957 Lawless was the first Black member of Chicago's Board of Health. His professional memberships included the American Medical Association, the National Medical Association, and the American Association for the Advancement of Science, and in 1935 he became a diplomate of the American Board of Dermatology and Syphilology. He served as an associate examiner in Dermatology for the National Board of Medical Examiners and as a consultant for the United States Chemical Warfare Board.

As an investor and businessman, he became a multi-millionaire, and had a significant business career. Lawless was director of both the Supreme Life Insurance Company and Marina City Bank. He was also a charter member, associate founder, and President of Service Federal Savings and Loan Association in Chicago.

== Philanthropy ==
Most of his philanthropy involved starting a number of dermatology programs in Israel. Lawless donated $160,000 ($1,800,000 in current dollar terms) in 1957 to, spearheaded a Chicago fundraising drive for, and established the 35-bed Lawless Department of Dermatology in Beilinson Hospital (later known as the Rabin Medical Center), near Tel Aviv, Israel. He also created the T. K. Lawless Student Summer Camp Program for Talented Children for the scientific training for Israeli children at the Weizmann Institute of Science, in Rehovot, Israel; the Lawless Clinical and Research Laboratory in Dermatology of the Hebrew Medical School in Jerusalem, Israel. He became well acquainted with Chaim Weizmann, Israel's first president. He thus repaid support received from Jewish doctors in obtaining his appointment to his position at the University of Paris. In 1969 he said: "I'm simply trying to repay a debt of gratitude." He explained his philanthropy for Israel and Jewish causes by pointing out that when he was a child in New Orleans, a Jewish peddler there was always kind to his family, a Jewish professor (Maurice Lenz) had helped him at Columbia University, and he also recalled another Jewish friend. In the 1960s, he worked for the Israel Bonds drive and purchased a large number of the bonds. In December 1967, on his fifth trip to Israel he made a donation establishing a fund to repair and restore ancient Biblical archaeological discoveries at the Israel Museum in Jerusalem, his fifth project in Israel.

Lawless also supported Roosevelt University's Chemical Laboratory and Lecture Auditorium, in Chicago, and Lawless Memorial Chapel at Dillard University, in New Orleans. In 1959, he was elected president of the Dillard University Board of Trustees. In 1967, ground was first broken for the Theodore K. Lawless Gardens, in his honor and of which he was a principal, a 13-acre 514-unit middle-income housing project at 35th and Rhodes Avenue on Chicago's South Side. He also served as chairman of the board of trustees of Talladega College, chairman of the American Missionary Association and Division of Higher Education of the Congregational and Christian Church, and director of Youth Services of the B'nai B'rith Foundation.

He died in Michael Reese Hospital in Chicago at age 78 on May 1, 1971. Lawless left $150,000 ($1,200,000 in current dollar terms) of his $1.25 million ($9,900,000 in current dollar terms) estate to the American Committee of the Weizmann Institute, a New York research institution.

== Honors ==
Lawless won the Harmon Award in Science for outstanding work in medicine in 1929.

In 1954, Lawless won and became the 39th recipient of the NAACP Spingarn Medal, presented annually to a Black American of distinguished achievement, for his contributions as a "physician, educator and philanthropist". In 1963 he received Roosevelt University's second annual Daniel H. Burnham Award. Phi Beta Kappa honored him with its Distinguished Service Award in 1966 for "acts of charity and medical service". In 1967 he received University of Kansas Distinguished Service Citation, and the City of Hope Golden Torch Award. In 1970 he received the Beatrice Caffrey Youth Service Merit Award.

He also received the Citation of the Weizmann Institute of Science in Rehovot, Israel, and the Greater Chicago Churchman Layman-of-the-Year Citation.

Lawless received honorary degrees from Talldega (D.Sc.), Howard University (D.Sc.), Bethune-Cookman College (LL.D.), the University of Illinois (LL.D.), and Virginia State University (LL.D.).

He was also honored by having a county park in Cass County near Vandalia, Michigan named after him (Dr. T.K. Lawless Park). The park features a range of outdoor activities, including a 10-mile mountain bike trail, shelters, softball fields, and soccer fields.

A portrait of Lawless painted by Betsy Graves Reyneau is in the collection of the Smithsonian Institution at the National Portrait Gallery. It was originally collected by the Harmon Foundation as part of a project to document noteworthy African Americans.
