= Aspen Institute Germany =

German think tank

Aspen Institute Deutschland e.V.
- Established: October 1974; 51 years ago
- Founder: Shepard Stone
- Type: Think tank, NGO
- Location: Berlin, Germany
- Director: Stormy-Annika Mildner
- Website: aspeninstitute.de

The Aspen Institute Germany (Aspen Institute Deutschland e.V.) is a German non-profit think tank focused on Euro-Atlantic cooperation, geopolitical and geoeconomic conflicts, and digitization. It organizes conferences and meetings on such topics with participants from politics, business, academia, media, culture, and civil society.

The Institute was founded in 1974 as an independent branch of the U.S.-based Aspen Institute in Washington, D.C. and is part of a worldwide network with partner organisations in the Czech Republic, France, Italy, Romania, Spain, India, Japan, Mexico, and Ukraine.

The chairman of the board of trustees is Eckart von Klaeden, and Stormy-Annika Mildner has been director since January 2021.

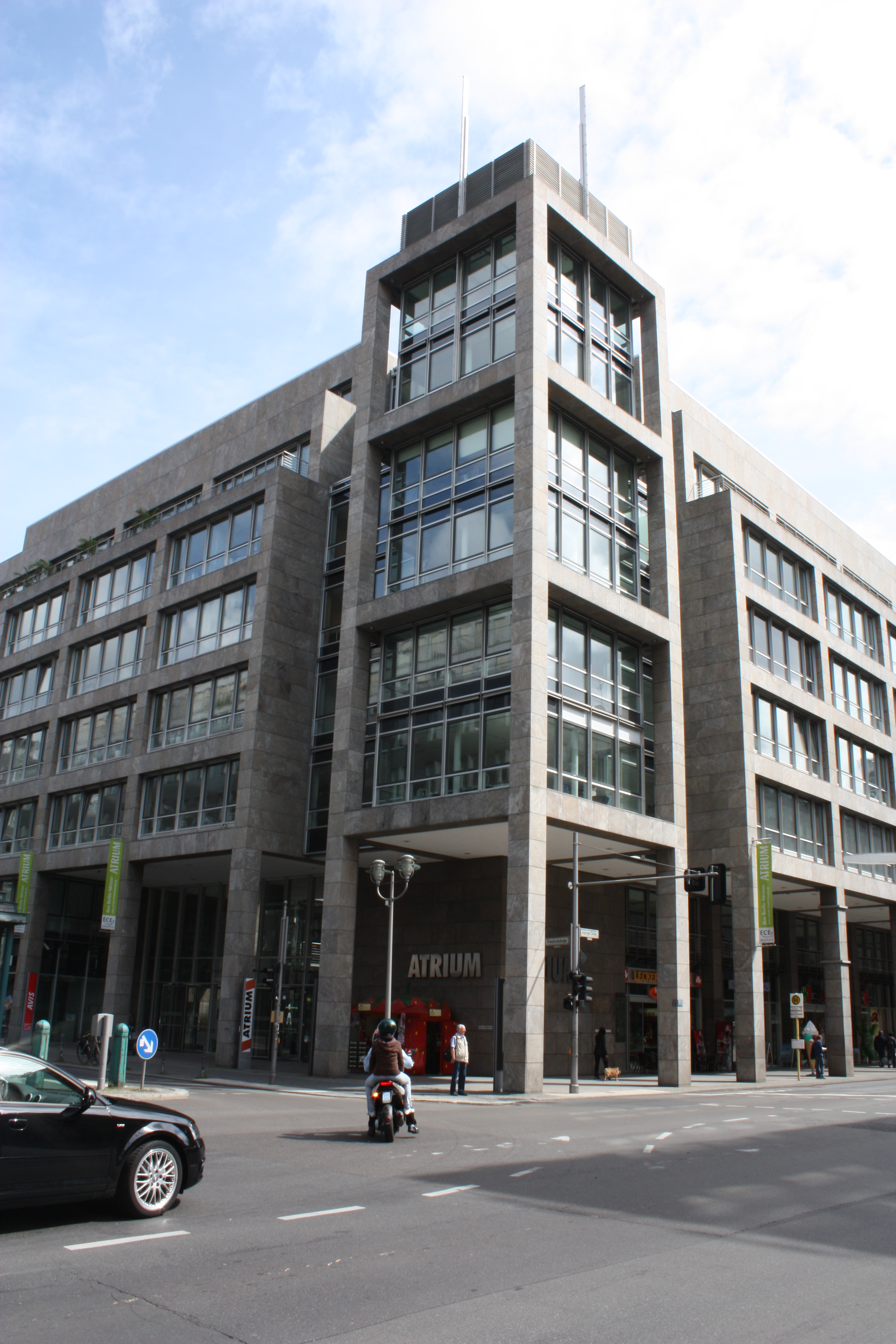
Aspen Institute Germany's headquarters in Berlin-Mitte

== History ==
The Aspen Institute Germany was founded in October 1974 - as the first in Europe - by Shepard Stone, who remained director until 1988.

From 1989 David Anderson, former U.S. Ambassador to Yugoslavia, took over as director. Between 1997 and 2001, Catherine McArdle Kelleher held the position.

In 2001 Jeffery Gedmin was appointed as director, and served until 2006. He was known to the German public for his support of U.S. policy on Iraq and his criticism of the foreign policy of Chancellor Gerhard Schröder.

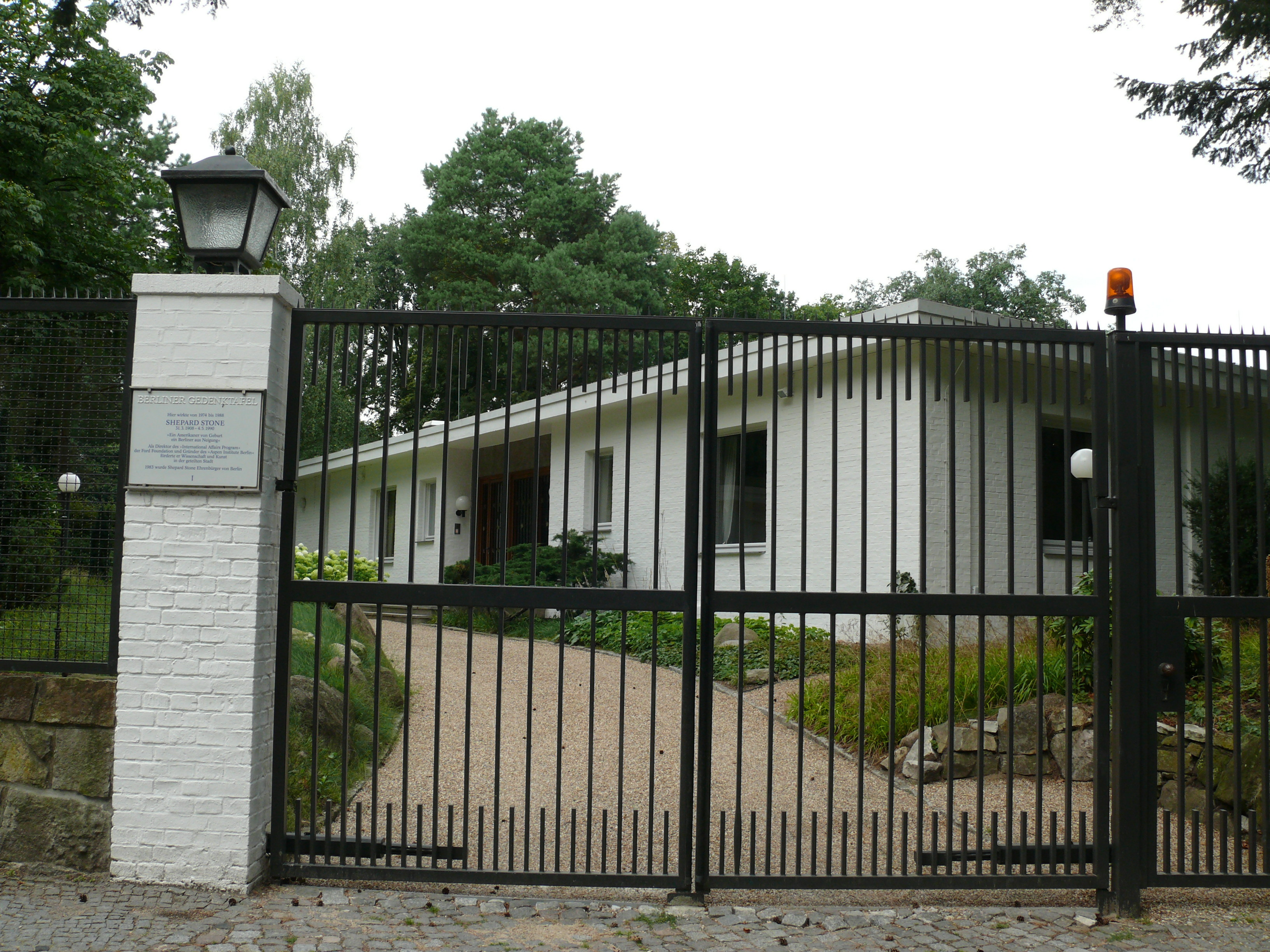
Former Aspen Institute Germany headquarters in Schwanenwerder

In August 2007, Charles King Mallory IV, previously an advisor to the head of the Middle East Division at the U.S. Department of State, took over as director of the Institute. During Mallory's presidency, the Berlin Senate cut the Aspen Institute's grants by about 500,000 euros and ultimately altogether. During this time, the Aspen Institute moved from its longtime villa on Schwanenwerder Island near Wannsee to its current headquarters in Berlin-Mitte.

From September 2013 until the end of 2020, Rüdiger Lentz was director of the institute; he was the first German to hold this position.

The Aspen Institute Germany celebrated its 40th anniversary in December 2014 by hosting a dialogue on transatlantic values.

In January 2021 Stormy-Annika Mildner took over as director of the Institute, after previously serving as head of the department for foreign economic policy at the Federation of German Industries.

In August 2024, the Aspen Institute Germany announced the 2024 Civil Society and Think Tank Forum in Berlin which marked the 10th anniversary of the Berlin Process.

== Funding ==
The Institute's funding comes from public institutions including the German Federal Press Office, the German Foreign Office, the Federal Ministry for Economic Affairs and Climate Action, as well as corporate members including Deutsche Bank AG, Daimler AG, and more than 100 private members. Public institutions which support the institute included the Dürr Foundation, Microsoft, the State of Baden-Württemberg and Telefónica.
