= SS Inger Skou =

Cargo ship

History
- Name: Cuxhaven (1943-48); Inger Skou (1948-52)
- Owner: Hamburg-Amerikanische Packetfahrt-Aktien-Gesellschaft (1943-45); American government (1945-48); Dampskibsselskabet af 1937 A/S - Ove Skou, (1948-52)
- Operator: Hamburg-Amerikanische Packetfahrt-Aktien-Gesellschaft (1943-45); American government (1945-48); Dampskibsselskabet af 1937 A/S - Ove Skou, (1948-52)
- Port of registry: (Nazi Germany) Hamburg, Germany (1945); United States (1945-48); Copenhagen, Denmark (1948-52)
- Builder: Deutsche Werft
- Yard number: 423
- Launched: 14 July 1943
- Completed: 28 September 1943
- Out of service: 3 June 1952
- Identification: Code Letters OYGS (1948-52)
- Fate: Ran aground and sank

General characteristics
- Class & type: Hansa A type Cargo ship
- Tonnage: 1,923 GRT; 1,017 NRT; 3,250 DWT
- Length: 86.74 m (284 ft 7 in)
- Beam: 13.51 m (44 ft 4 in)
- Draught: 5.68 m (18 ft 8 in)
- Depth: 4.75 m (15 ft 7 in)
- Installed power: Compound steam engine, 1,200IHP (1943-48); Steam engine (1948-52)
- Propulsion: Single screw propeller
- Speed: 10.5 knots (19.4 km/h)

Location where Inger Skou ran aground and sunk

Inger Skou was a Hansa A Type cargo ship which was built as Cuxhaven in 1943 by Deutsche Werft, Hamburg, Germany. She was seized as a prize of war in 1945, passing to the United States. She was allocated to Denmark in 1948 and was renamed Inger Skou. She ran aground and sank in 1952.

== Description ==
The ship was 86.74 m (284 ft 7 in) long, with a beam of 13.51 m (44 ft 4 in). She had a depth of 4.75 m (15 ft 7 in). She was assessed as 1,923 GRT, 1.017 NRT, 3,250 DWT.

The ship was propelled by a compound steam engine built by Deutsche Werft. Rated at 1,200 indicated horsepower (890 kW), it drove a single propeller and could propel the ship at 10.5 knots (19.4 km/h; 12.1 mph).

== History ==
Cuxhaven was a Hansa A Type cargo ship built in 1943 as yard number 423 by Deutsche Werft, Hamburg She was launched on 14 July 1943 and completed on 28 September. Her port of registry was Hamburg.

On 9 October, Cuxhaven was severely damaged in an air raid at Gotenhafen. She was towed to the Isselfjord. In 1945, she was seized as a prize by the United States. In 1948 she was sold to Denmark and was rebuilt by HSM. A Lentz steam engine was installed. Post-rebuild she was assessed at 1,806 GRT. She was sold to Dampskibsselskabet af 1937 A/S - Ove Skou and was renamed Inger Skou. Her port of registry was Copenhagen and the Code Letters OYGS were allocated.

On 3 June 1952, Inger Skou ran aground on the Chinchorro Bank, off the coast of British Honduras (18°40′N 87°13′W) and sank. She was on a voyage from New Orleans, Louisiana, United States to Belize City, British Honduras. The loss was attributed to careless navigation.
