= Shepard Stone =

American journalist

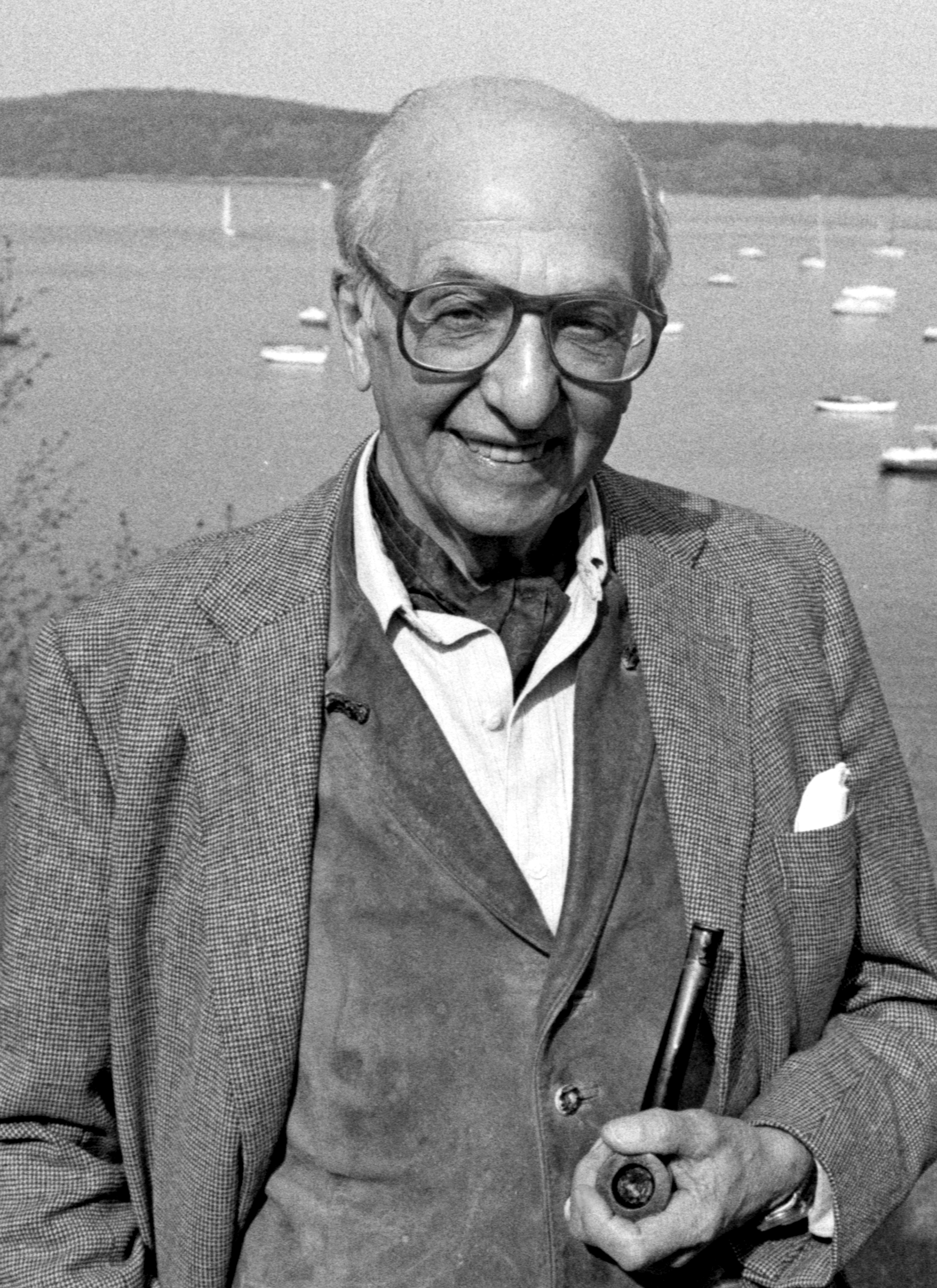
Shepard Stone in Berlin (1988)

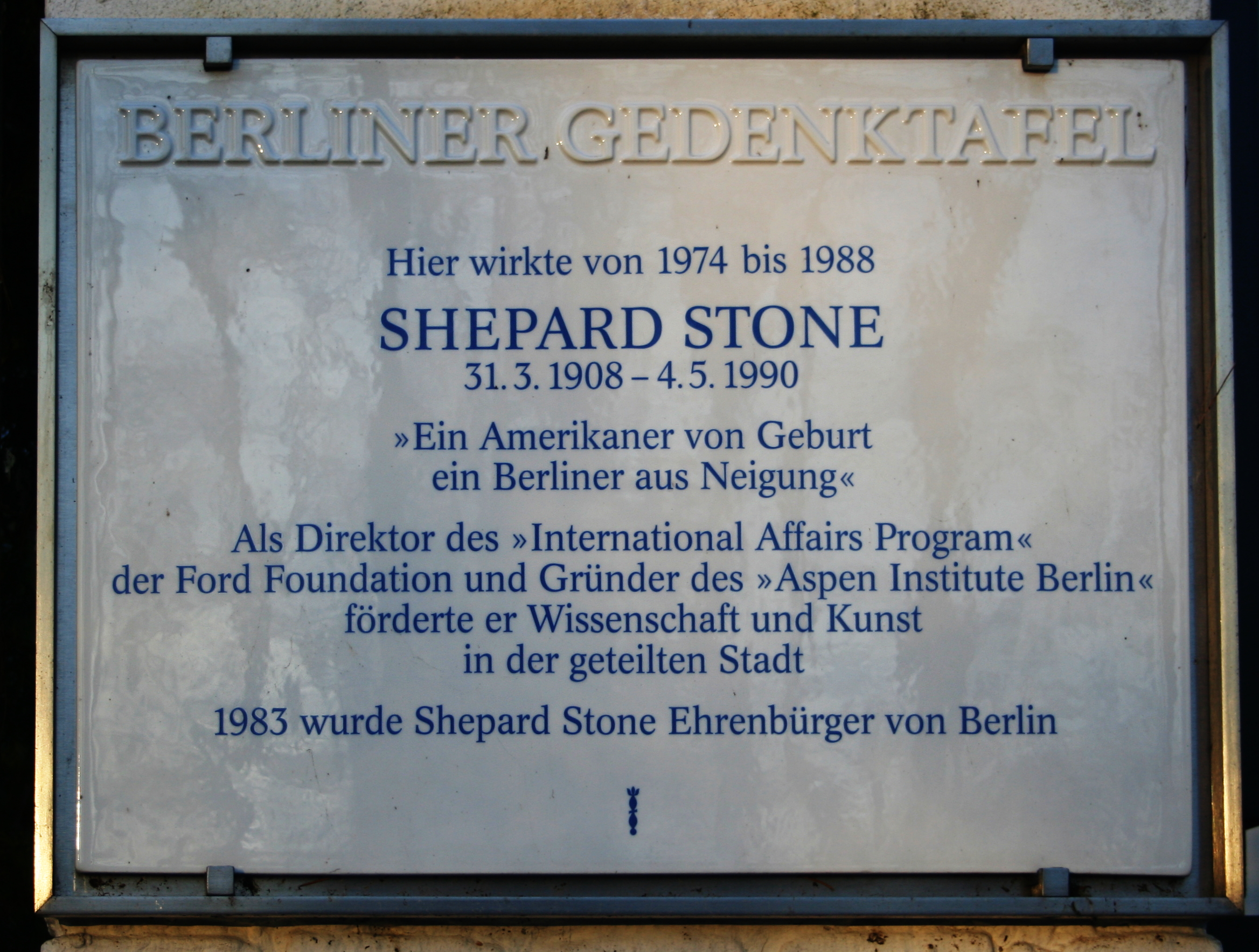
Memorial plaque at the Aspen Institute on Schwanenwerder island in Berlin commemorating Stone's work in the city.

Shepard Stone (March 31, 1908 – May 4, 1990) was an American journalist and foundation administrator.

== Life and work ==
=== Education and journalism ===
Shepard Stone was the son of Jewish immigrants from Lithuania. After graduating from Nashua High School, he followed the example of his older brother and changed his last name from Cohen to Stone. He graduated from Dartmouth College in New Hampshire with a degree in history. He then studied political science and history in Heidelberg and Berlin, earning his doctorate in history from the University of Berlin.

On 15 August 1933, he married Charlotte Hasenclever-Jaffé and returned to the United States that same year. There Stone worked as a political journalist until 1942 and was also a reporter for the New York Times from 1934 to 1935, after which he became deputy editor of the Sunday edition, a position he held until 1942.

In 1942 he joined the U.S. army and was active in wartime intelligence work.

=== Development of the newspaper industry ===
Stone returned to Germany in 1944 as a volunteer in the first American advance party to land in Normandy on 6 June 1944. He advanced with the American army as far as Torgau and was present when the Buchenwald concentration camp was liberated. After the war, Shepard Stone advised the American occupation authorities on the reconstruction of the newspaper industry until 1946. When he was discharged from the army with the rank of lieutenant colonel, he resumed his former position as second editor-in-chief of the Sunday edition of the New York Times in 1946. But as early as the beginning of November 1949, Stone was appointed deputy to the special adviser for public affairs and information at the American High Commissioner in Germany. He then replaced Special Advisor Ralph Nicholson as head of this office from September 1950. Stone was thus responsible for the media, as well as for the areas of culture and science. He worked to build a democratic press in post-war Germany by helping publishers and journalists tap into sources of funding and promoting various exchange programmes.

=== Ford Foundation, Congress for Cultural Freedom, IACF ===
After his term of office ended, Stone returned to America in 1952. One year later, he was accepted onto the staff of the Ford Foundation and was director of the foundation's international affairs department from 1953 to 1968. During this time, Shepard Stone was particularly active in supporting West Berlin: He arranged for donations in the millions for the expansion of the Free University of Berlin, the Deutsche Oper opera house, and various scientific institutes such as the John F. Kennedy Institute for North American Studies and Institute for East European Studies.

Shepard Stone was a supporter of the Congress for Cultural Freedom (CCF) through his work at the Ford Foundation. At the beginning of the 1960s, it became known that the CCF's basic funding came from the CIA via the Ford Foundation. When the Congress for Cultural Freedom (CCF) came to an end in 1967, Shepard Stone became president of the successor organisation, the International Association for Cultural Freedom (IACF). However, its influence was considerably less.

=== Aspen Institute ===
In 1974, Stone went again to Berlin in a role as first director of Aspen in Berlin, a partner institute to American non-profit organization, the Aspen Institute. He remained there until retirement in 1988.

As director of the newly founded Berlin Aspen Institute on Schwanenwerder Island, the first European branch of the Aspen Institute for Humanistic Relations in Aspen, of which he was also a member of the board of trustees, he pursued his life's work: Shepard Stone enabled scientists from all over the world to participate in international exchange and research projects in over 270 international conferences and seminars that the institute held under his direction.

In 1983, the McCloy Academic Scholarship Program for outstanding German students at the Kennedy School of Government at Harvard University was established on the initiative of Shepard Stone.

He was a participant in many of the Bilderberg and Pugwash conferences. He was a member of the Steering Committee of the Bilderberg Group.

On 4 May 1990, Shepard Stone suffered a heart attack while driving to a conference at Dartmouth College, and died at the age of 82.
