= Linz (disambiguation) =

Linz is a city on the Danube in Upper Austria, Austria.

Linz may also refer to:

== Places ==
- Linz am Rhein, a small on the Rhine in Rhineland-Palatinate, Germany
- Linz, a subdivision of the town of Himmelberg in Carinthia, Austria

== Other uses ==
- Land Information New Zealand, a New Zealand government agency
- SS Linz, an Austro-Hungarian ocean liner that hit a mine and sank in the Adriatic Sea in 1918
- Symphony No. 36 (Mozart), a symphony by Mozart known as the "Linz Symphony"

== People with the surname ==
- Alex D. Linz (born 1989), American actor
- Amélie Linz (1824–1904), German author
- Cathie Linz (1954–2013), American librarian and writer
- Christoph Linz von Dondorf (born 1529), German colonizer in Brazil
- Juan José Linz (1926–2013), Spanish-German professor of sociology and political science
- Paul Linz (born 1956), German football player and manager
- Peter Linz (born 1967), American puppeteer
- Phil Linz (1939–2020), American baseball player
- Pia Linz (born 1964), German artist
- Karel Linz (born 1986), Czech volleyball player
- Mark Linz (1935–2013), German-American publisher
- Roland Linz (born 1981), Austrian footballer

== See also ==
- Linz Program of 1882
