= Lenz, Oregon =

Lenz, Oregon may refer to the following unincorporated communities in the United States:

- Lenz, Hood River County, Oregon
- Lenz, Klamath County, Oregon
