= Rüdiger Lentz =

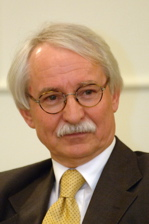

Executive Director, Aspen Institute Germany

Personal details
- Born: 21 September 1947 (age 78) Velden (Vils), Bavaria, Germany
- Profession: Journalist

Rüdiger Lentz was born in 1947 and serves as a Senior Advisor to Rud Pedersen Public Affairs. Previously, he served as Director of the Aspen Institute Germany in Berlin, Germany from 2013 to 2020.

== Education ==
Lentz studied political science, history and economics at the University of Hamburg during his tenure as a career officer in the armed forces.

== Career ==
His career as a journalist started in 1976, when he joined Der Spiegel, Germany's weekly news magazine, as a correspondent for military and security affairs. In 1981 he became a TV reporter, national commentator and presenter of a weekly TV program on world affairs with ARD, Germany's largest public TV and radio station. In 1988, he joined RIAS-TV in Berlin, a joint US-German radio and TV station, becoming editor in chief. He was bureau chief in Brussels for six years, responsible for Deutsche Welle's radio and TV coverage of the creation of the Euro and the enlargement of NATO and the EU. In January 1999 he became Bureau Chief and Senior Diplomatic Correspondent for Deutsche Welle Radio and Television in Washington. As the representative of Germany's only international broadcaster in the United States, Lentz managed its journalistic, public diplomacy, marketing and regulatory affairs. In November 2009, Lentz took over the position as the first Executive Director of the German-American Heritage Foundation of the USA and the German-American Heritage Museum of the USA located at 719 6th Street NW in Washington, D.C. Since September 2013, Lentz returned to Berlin to head the Aspen Institute Germany as their Director. He was succeeded in that role by Stormy Anika Mildner in 2021. In 2014, Lentz was awarded the Lucius D. Clay Medal for his contributions to the German-American relationship.

== Associations ==
Lentz is a board member of the German American Business Council (GABC) and a member of the Atlantik-Brücke, a German-American foundation aimed at enhancing transatlantic relations. He also held the position of the president of Atlantic Initiative U.S., a non-profit, non-partisan organization founded to promote transatlantic cooperation and strengthen Germany’s foreign policy culture.
