= Aloys Lenz (politician, born 1910) =

German politician (1910 - 1976)

Member of the Bundestag
- In office 7 September 1949 – 19 October 1969

Personal details
- Born: 10 February 1910
- Died: 1 March 1976 (aged 66)
- Party: CDU

Aloys Lenz (2 February 1910 – 1 March 1976) was a German politician of the Christian Democratic Union (CDU) and former member of the German Bundestag.

== Life ==
Lenz was deputy district chairman of the CDU in the district of Cologne. From 1947 to 1950 he was a member of the state parliament in North Rhine-Westphalia, where he represented the constituency of Cologne-Land-South. Lenz was a member of the German Bundestag from its first election in 1949 to 1969. During this period he was always elected directly to parliament in the constituency of Cologne-Land. From 10 February 1953 to 21 January 1970 he was also a member of the European Parliament.

== Literature ==
Herbst, Ludolf; Jahn, Bruno (2002). Vierhaus, Rudolf (ed.). Biographisches Handbuch der Mitglieder des Deutschen Bundestages. 1949–2002 [Biographical Handbook of the Members of the German Bundestag. 1949–2002] (in German). München: De Gruyter - De Gruyter Saur. p. 1715. ISBN 978-3-11-184511-1.
