= Pia Linz =

German artist

Pia Linz (born 1964) is a German artist and professor of drawing in painting at the Kunsthochschule Berlin-Weißensee.

Her work is included in the collections of the National Gallery of Canada and the Kunstmuseum Wolfsburg.
