= Marcel Lenz =

Marcel Lenz is the name of:

- Marcel Lenz (footballer, born 1987), German football player
- Marcel Lenz (footballer, born 1991), German football player
