= Lentz Center for Asian Culture =

- Established: 1983
- Dissolved: 2010
- Location: 1155 Q Street; Lincoln, Nebraska
- Coordinates: 40°48′56″N 96°42′16″W
- Type: Art museum

The Lentz Center for Asian Culture was located at 1155 Q Street in downtown Lincoln, Nebraska. The Lentz Center was established by the University of Nebraska–Lincoln in 1983 to "showcase the rich and varied cultures within Asia and embody the university's strong commitment to fostering multicultural understanding through an appreciation of Asian cultures."

The Lentz Center was located at Morrill Hall, home of the University of Nebraska State Museum, until 1986, when it moved to the corner of Q and 12th Streets in downtown Lincoln. The center stopped featuring regular exhibitions in 2010 due to financial concerns, but its collection of over one thousand artifacts was digitized for online viewing and became the Lentz Collection for Asian Culture. The Lentz Center Advisory Board, made up of university faculty members who specialize in Asian studies, was formed to determine how the collection could best be presented to the public. The space became part of the Great Plains Art Museum.

The center was named for former band director Donald Lentz and his wife and Velma, who developed a passion for Asian music and history during their travels to the continent, later donating their private collection to the university. Velma served as director of the center until retiring in 1995.
