= Max Lenz =

German historian (1850–1932)

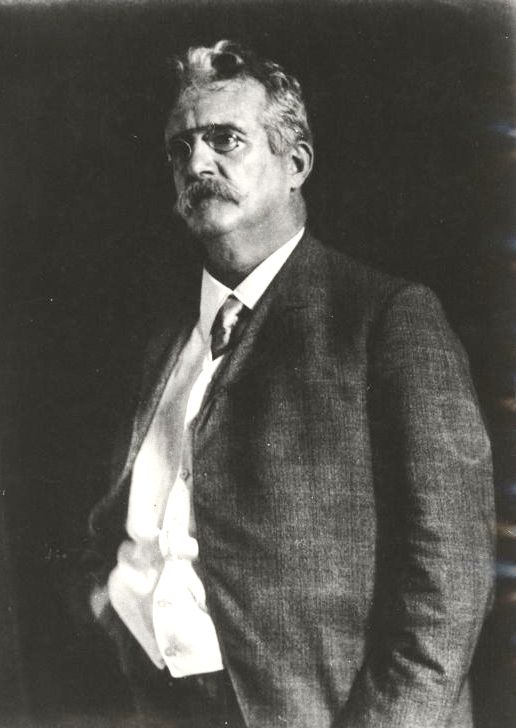
Max Lenz (1897); by Rudolf Dührkoop

Max Albert Wilhelm Lenz (13 June 1850 – 6 April 1932) was a German historian.

== Biography ==
Lenz was born to a Prussian and devoutly Lutheran notary in Greifswald, Province of Pomerania. After graduating from school, he studied history and classical philology under Heinrich von Sybel for three semesters in Bonn. He served in the 1870-1871 Franco-Prussian War and was wounded in the Battle of Villiers. He then continued his studies, at first in Greifswald for one semester, and then in Berlin.

In 1874, he finished his dissertation about the Alliance of Canterbury and its significance for the Hundred Years' War and the Council of Constance. In the following year he started working for the secret state archives in Marburg with the duty of editing the correspondence of Philip I, Landgrave of Hesse. It would be published in three volumes from 1880 to 1891. Meanwhile, he also wrote his habilitation about the Council of Constance, which he finished in 1876. In the following decade, he studied the Protestant Reformation, publishing a biography of Martin Luther in 1883.

In 1881, he became adjunct professor at the University of Marburg and in 1885 he attained full professorship. In 1888, switched to the University of Breslau and in 1890 to Frederick William University in Berlin.

Alongside Hans Delbrück, Dietrich Schäfer, and Gustav Schmoller, he became one of the most important historians in Berlin. Unlike those other three, he avoided involvement in political matters and thus had more difficulties securing his influence. A supporter of the methodology of Leopold von Ranke, Lenz advocated complete objectivity and neutrality in the study of history. During the Methodenstreit, an intellectual controversy over the way academic enquiry is framed, he was a bitter opponent of Karl Gottfried Lamprecht. In Berlin, Lenz continued to study the Reformation, publishing works about Gustav Adolf and Albrecht von Wallenstein, but he also started devoting his attention to other epochs, such as the French Revolution, the Napoleonic era, and the early German Empire. He thus published a biography of Otto von Bismarck in 1902.

In 1911, Lenz became the director of the Frederick William University of Berlin history faculty, and from 1911 to 1912 he was the rector of the university. In 1914, he moved to the Hamburg Colonial Institute and was a key figure in its transformation into the University of Hamburg. In 1922, Lenz went into retirement and moved back to Berlin, where he died in 1932, aged 81.
