= Maurice Lenz =

American physician (1890–1974)

- Born: March 23, 1890; Kovno, Russian Empire
- Died: January 4, 1974 (aged 83); Englewood, NJ
- Education: Medical doctor, 1913
- Alma mater: Columbia University College of Physicians and Surgeons
- Occupations: Professor, Radiation Oncology
- Years active: 1913-1974
- Employer(s): Columbia University College of Physicians and Surgeons
- Title: Director, Division of Cancer of the City of New York
- Spouse: Anna Marie Malmberg

Maurice Lenz (March 23, 1890 – January 4, 1974) was a pioneer in the field of radiation therapy. Born in Kovno, Russian Empire (now Kaunas, Lithuania), Lenz studied at New York University and Bellevue Medical College, and received his medical degree from Columbia University College of Physicians and Surgeons in 1913. He was a professor of radiation oncology at the Columbia University College of Physicians and Surgeons, a past president of the American Radium Society and held many other clinical and administrative roles throughout his long career in medicine.

According to the Columbia University Health Sciences Library archivist Stephen C. Novak:

Lenz's unusual linguistic abilities - besides Russian and English he was fluent in French, German, Portuguese, and Spanish - made him an internationally known figure among radiotherapists. He led the US delegation to the Second Inter-American Congress of Radiology in 1946 and was a member of the Third Congress in 1949. At the request of the US State Dept., he undertook lecture tours in the USSR in 1959 and 1967. In 1971, he represented the US at the 50th anniversary celebration of the Radium Institute of the Curie Foundation.

Lenz served in the U.S. Army Medical Corps, as a lieutenant in general medical practice during World War I. Following the war, he studied in Europe at Freiburg University in Germany. He completed a fellowship in radiation therapy at the Curie Institute in Paris, France where he established personal friendships with famous researchers in radiation, including Claudius Regaud, Octave Monod, François Baclesse and Antoine Lacassagne. Returning to the United States in 1925, Lenz served as director of radiotherapy at the Montefiore Hospital in New York City until 1930. He held the same position at the Presbyterian Hospital of Columbia University and the Francis Delafield Hospital and was the director of the Division of Cancer of the City of New York (concurrently) through 1955. As a visiting professor of the World Health Organization in 1959, Lenz visited countries throughout Asia and the Soviet Union. Despite his retirement from the practice of medicine, Dr. Lenz continued his studies with research fellowships, at the Curie Institute and in ovarian cancer with the Radiumhemmet in Stockholm, Sweden.
