= Future Champions Sports Complex =

Multi-field baseball and softball complex

Coordinates: 39°44′42″N 90°15′52″W

Future Champions Sports Complex, formerly known as Lenz Field, is a multi-field baseball and softball complex in Jacksonville, Illinois.

The complex is privately owned by area residents Adam and Kristin Jamison, along with several partners. In a typical tournament season, the complex hosts approximately thirty events, in addition to several standalone college and area high school baseball and softball games. Its estimated yearly impact on the local economy is approximately $3M, according to Jacksonville's mayor, Andy Ezard.

== History ==
The complex began as a single field, built to Little League standard dimensions that was completed in June 2007, at a cost of approximately $400,000. The original field, now known as Field #6 within the complex, is entirely artificial turf.

The following year, a large tract of land across the street from the original field was purchased by Passavant Area Hospital, which in turn sold portions of that land to Lenz, who began construction on additional fields. By May of 2009, three additional fields - now known as Field #1, Field #2, and Field #3 - were ready for play, with the original field being renamed as Field #4. The final two fields would be completed in 2011 and 2012, respectively.

Future Champions Sports Complex is known regionally as a facility that is rarely impacted by inclement weather, with few rained out games and the ability to quickly make its fields ready for play after a heavy downpour.

== Fields ==
The fields at the complex are numbered in sequence from 1-6. Field #1 is considered to be the "showcase" field in the complex and is fully artificial turf. Field #2 has an artificial turf infield and grass outfield, as does Field #3. Field #4 is fully artificial turf. Field #5 has an artificial turf infield and grass outfield and is designed for softball and younger age group baseball. Field #6 is the original fully artificial turf field, located across the street from the main part of the Future Champions Sports Complex facility complex. Field #6, like Field #1 and Field #4, is fully artificial turf.
