= Maximilian Lenz =

Austrian artist (1860–1948)

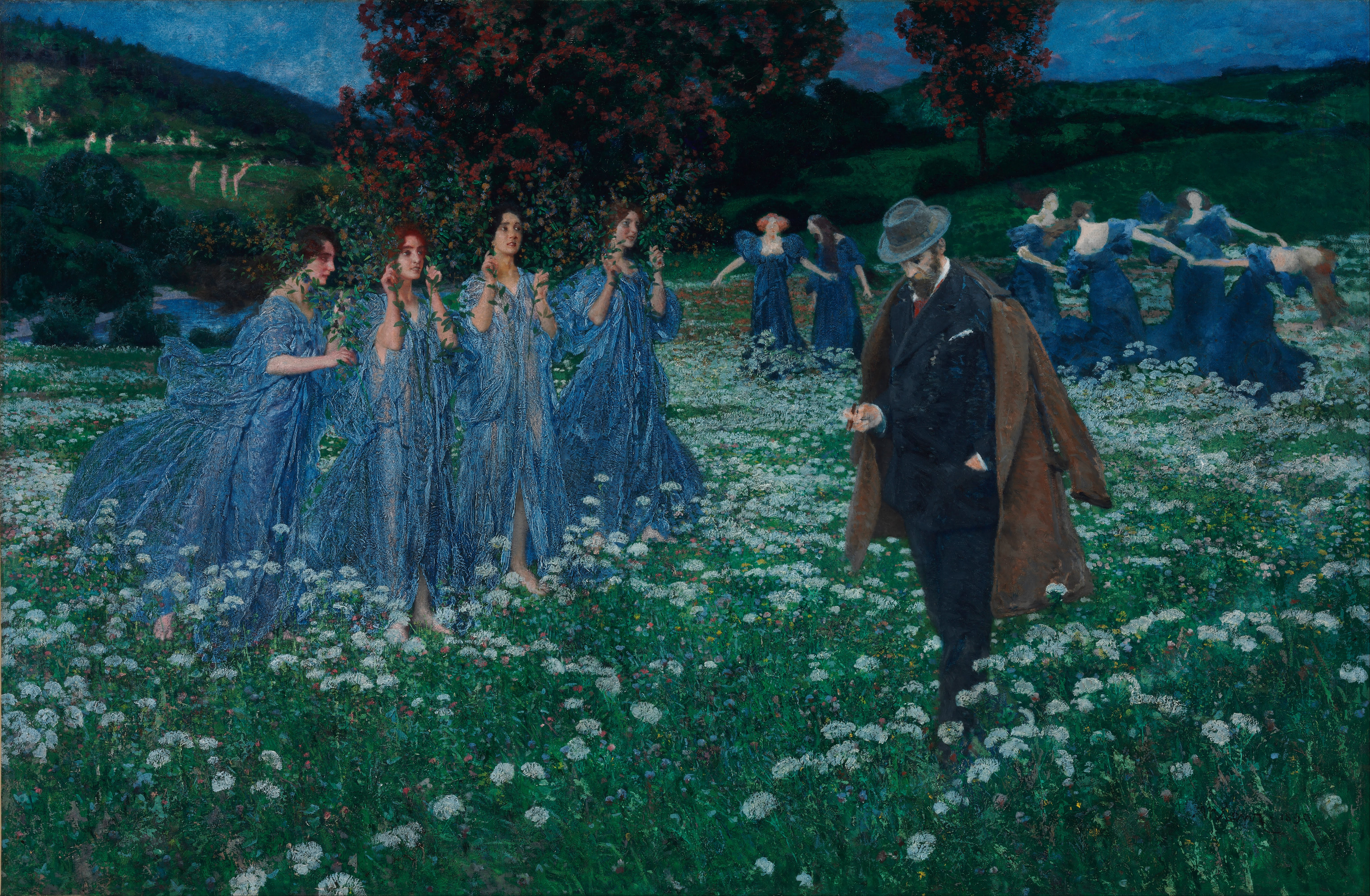
A World (1899)

Maximilian Lenz (4 October 1860 – 19 May 1948) was an Austrian painter, graphic artist and sculptor. Lenz was a founding member of the Vienna Secession; during his career's most important period, he was a Symbolist, but later his work became increasingly naturalistic. He worked in a variety of media, including oils, watercolours, lithography and metal reliefs.

== Life ==
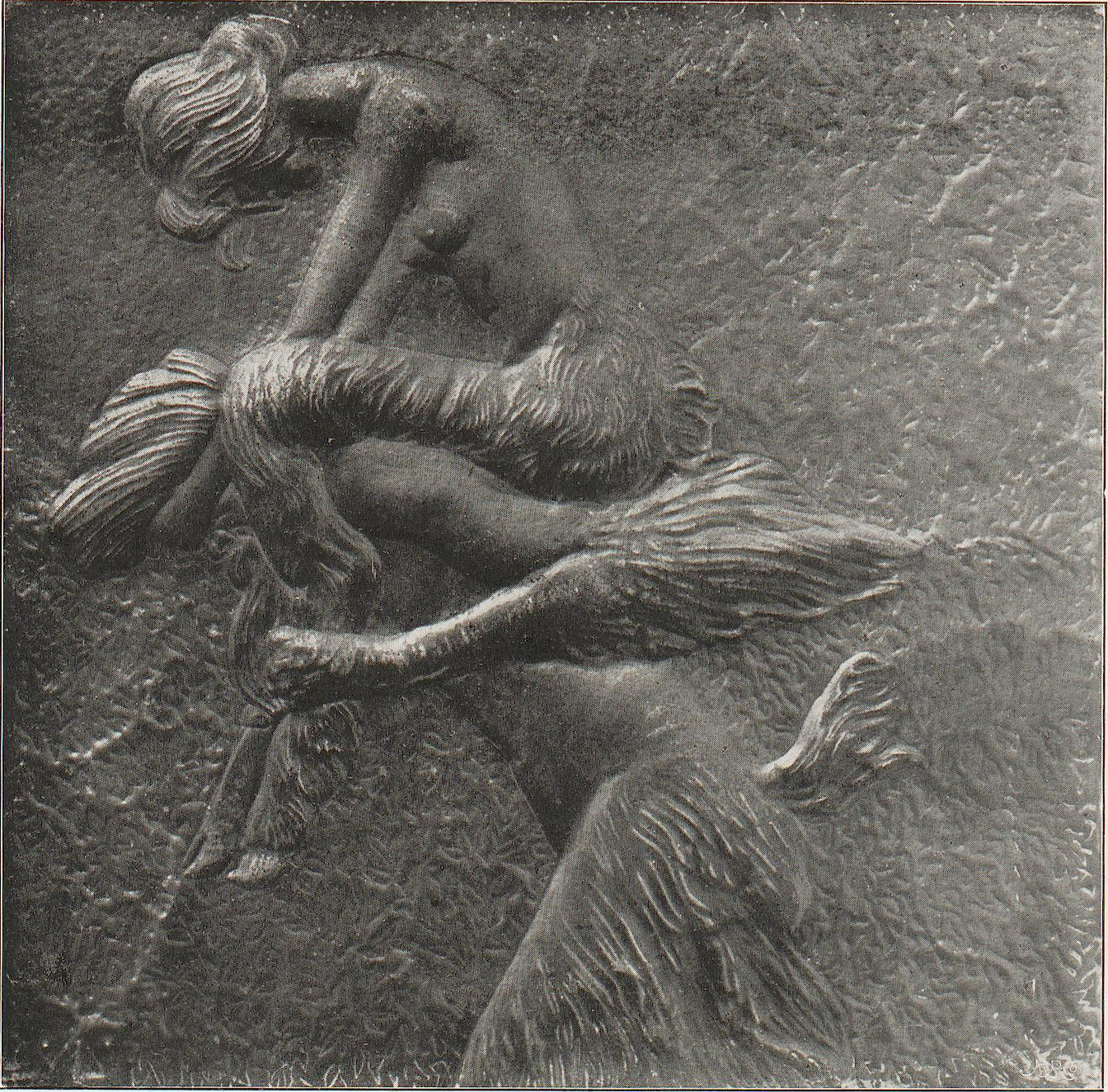
Copper relief from the Fourteenth Exhibition of the Vienna Secession (1902)

Lenz was born in Vienna. He studied at the Kunstgewerbeschule in Vienna, then at the Academy of Fine Arts, Vienner Carl Wurzinger and Christian Griepenkerl. A member of the Vienna Künstlerhaus spent the early 1890s in South America, designing banknotes in Buenos Aires.

In 1897, Lenz left the Künstlerhaus to become a founding member of the Vienna Secession, and his work for the group's first exhibition was hailed as "outstanding". His 1899 painting, A World (Eine Welt, also translated as A Day Dream), draws on the time's prevailing currents, including dreamlike and fantastic imagery painted in intense colour. It was shown at the Fourth Exhibition of the Vienna Secession in spring 1899, and received critical praise for its "graceful charm and dreamy yet sparkling beauty" and its mood of "pure grace and musical euphony". The painting was also shown in winter 1911-12 with the Munich Secession.

Having shown his picture On the Way to Wonderland at the Tenth Exhibition of the Vienna Secession in 1901 and the Thirteenth Exhibition in spring 1902, at the Secession's Fourteenth Exhibition in the summer of that year (the 'Beethoven exhibition') he showed a number of reliefs in various metals, which were noted as beautiful and inventive. Some of his copper panels were also shown at the 1904 World's Fair in St Louis.

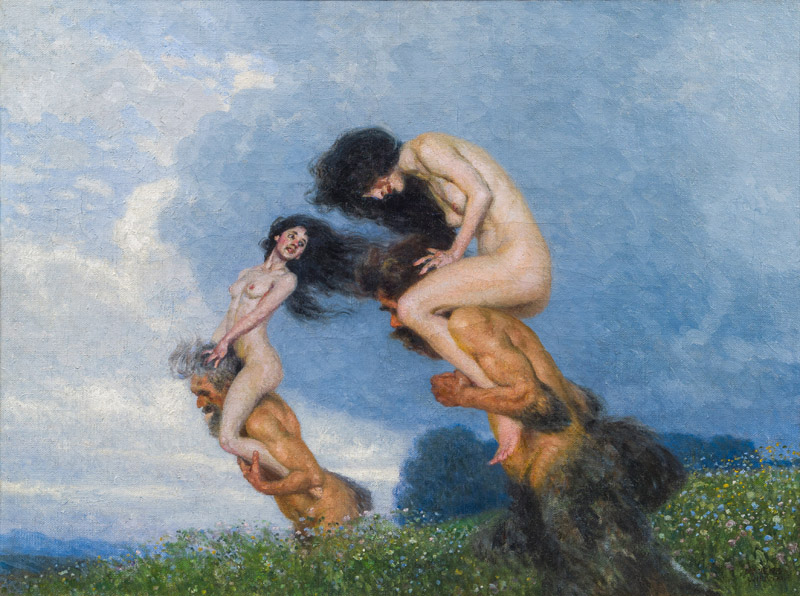
Summer Lust (1906)

However, a foray, together with various other Secession artists, into woodcuts for the Beethoven exhibition catalogue was panned as "rough" and more like the work of an amateur than an experienced painter, albeit enthusiastic and not totally without merit.

With Gustav Klimt, Lenz visited Ravenna in the winter of 1903-04, where they saw and were influenced by the golden mosaics. At the Twentieth Exhibition in 1904, Lenz's painting Iduna's Apples, was considered to be one of the highlights amongst the paintings shown, along with the works of Klimt and Rudolf von Alt. The large painting, similar in style to Aubrey Beardsley, created a "gorgeous" effect of gold and black: a black-haired woman sits in a lush landscape, wearing only a golden crown and sat on a golden cloak, holding Iduna's apple—also golden—in her hands. Within the Secession, for the first decade Lenz was a Pre-Raphaelite influence; after 1910, his work showed more naturalism, and he moved away from the foreground after 1918.

== Art nouveau ==
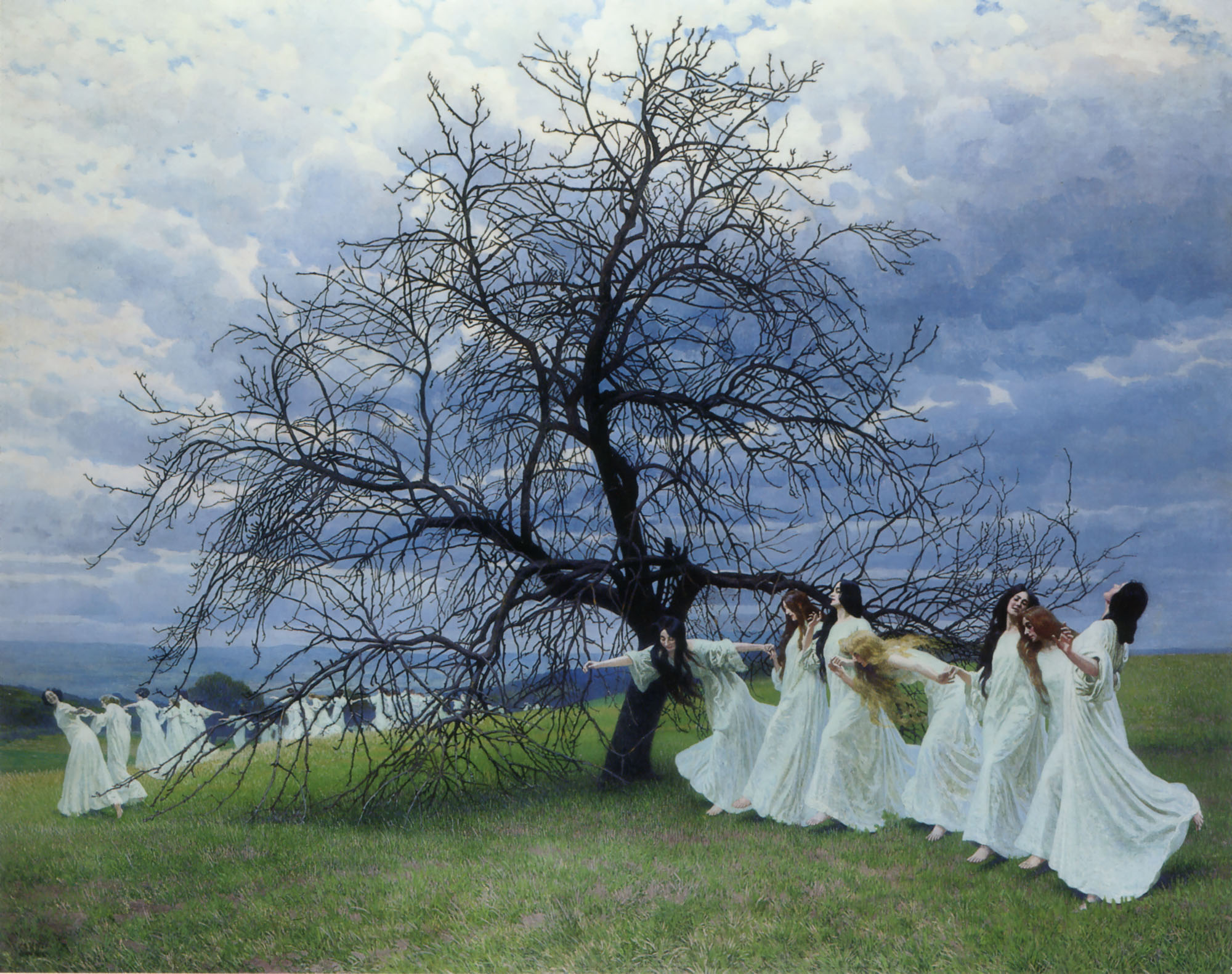
A Song of Spring (1913)

Lenz served on the Secession's official committee in 1905 and again in 1906. He also exhibited with the Secession in spring 1906, showing the Forest King and the Wailing Maiden; in 1907; in 1908 at the Twenty-Ninth Exhibition; in 1909 and 1910, showing the playful painting Marionnetes; in 1911, showing Concert; in 1913; and as part of a collective exhibition in 1941.

His 1913 painting A Song of Spring was influenced by the dancer Isadora Duncan's 1904 stay in Vienna, sharing her symbolic themes of cyclic renewal and rebirth and featuring mediaeval costume. These ideas and a connection with dance are also prominent within Klimt's work, and the Symbolist movement as a whole. Lenz also painted religious themes, including The Baptism of the Ethiopians.

During World War I, Lenz created several posters advertising Austro-Hungarian war bonds.

In 1926, he married painter Ida Kupelwieser (1870–1927), the daughter of the jurist Karl Kupelwieser.

He left the Secession and rejoined the Künstlerhaus in 1938.

== Selected works ==
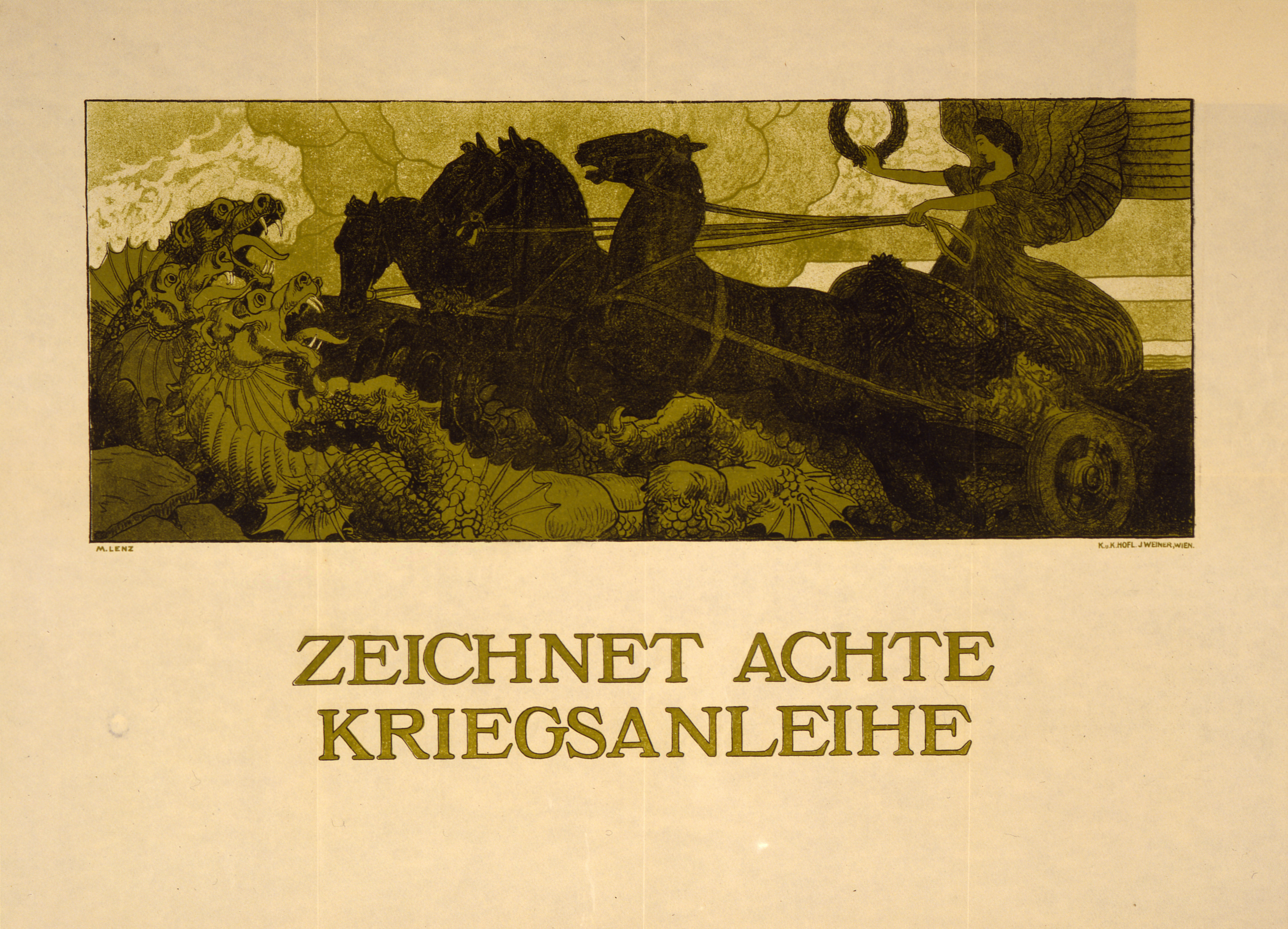
A 1917 poster advertising war bonds, designed by Lenz

- Spring. Colour lithograph, 1898, 13.97 x 15.08 cm. Museum of Fine Arts, Boston (accession number: 1991.847).
- A World. Oil on canvas, 1899, 121.5 x 186.0 cm. Museum of Fine Arts, Budapest (accession number: 20.B).
- Woman in White Beneath a Fruited Tree and Woman in Yellow Beneath a Bare-branched Tree. Pen, ink and gouache designs for stained glass windows, c. 1900, 11.8 x 14.7 cm and 11.8 x 14.2 cm. Museum of Fine Arts, Boston (accession numbers: 1990.606 and 1990.607).
- The Artist's Studio. Oil on canvas, before 1902, 47.7 x 57.7 cm. Museum of Fine Arts, Budapest (accession number: 39.B).
- Summer Lust. Oil on canvas, 1906, 74.5 x 100 cm.
- Spring. Oil on canvas, c. 1904, 174.2 x 365.7 cm. National Museum Wales (accession number: NMW A 589).
- A Song of Spring. Oil on canvas, 1913, 162.00 x 201.00 cm.

== Gallery ==
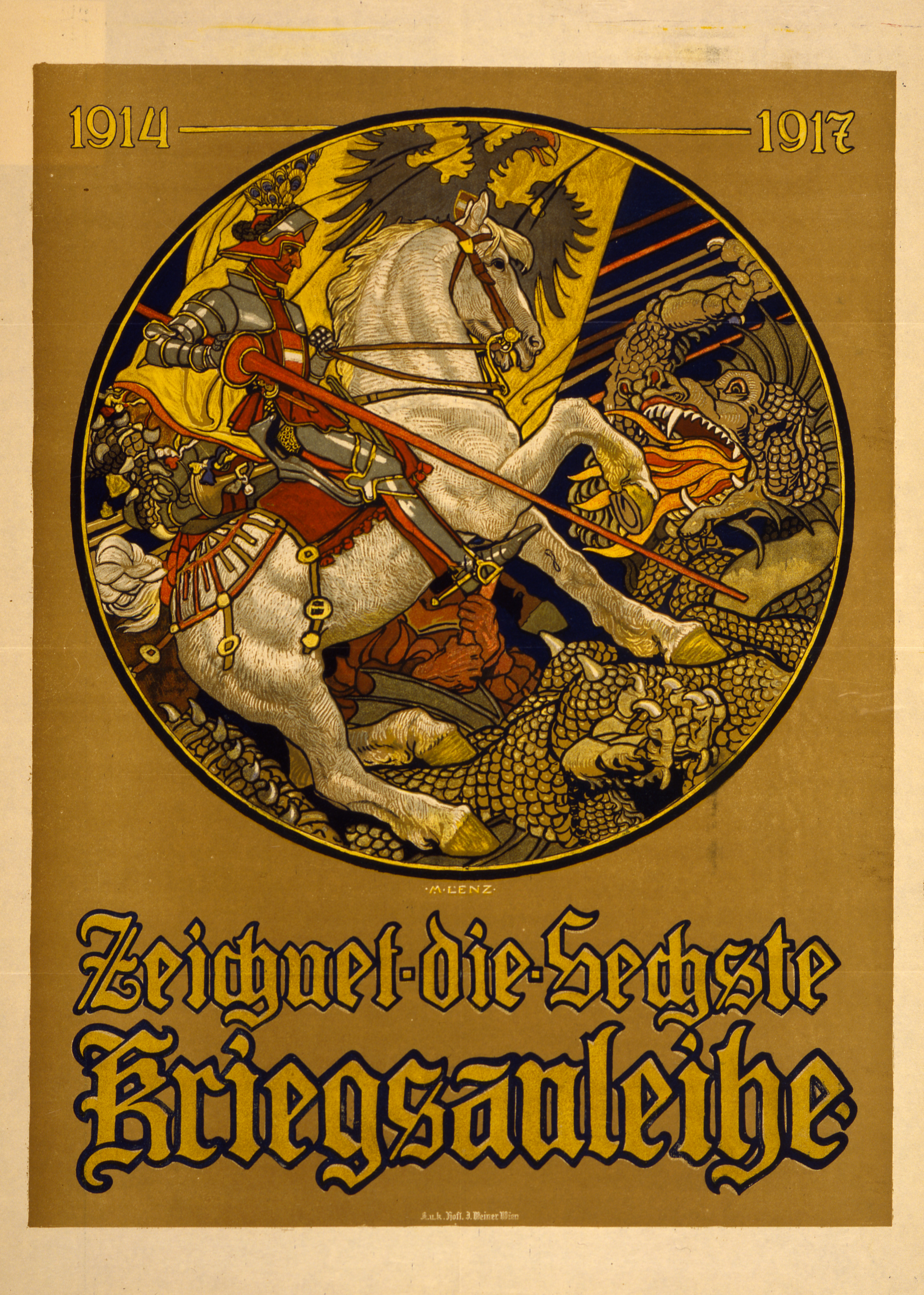
Poster advertising war bonds (1917)

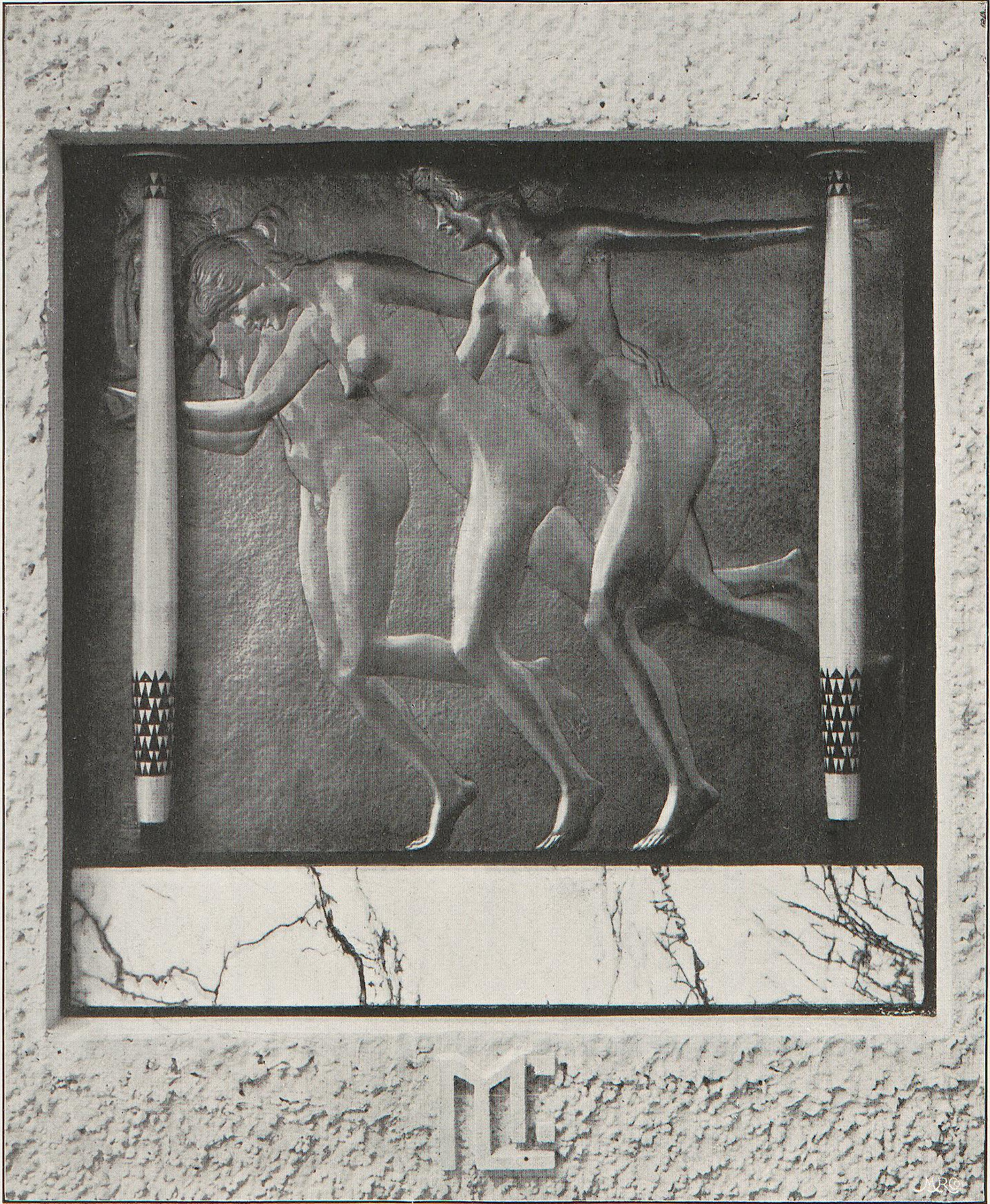
Brass relief set in marble and wood from the Fourteenth Exhibition of the Vienna Secession (1902)

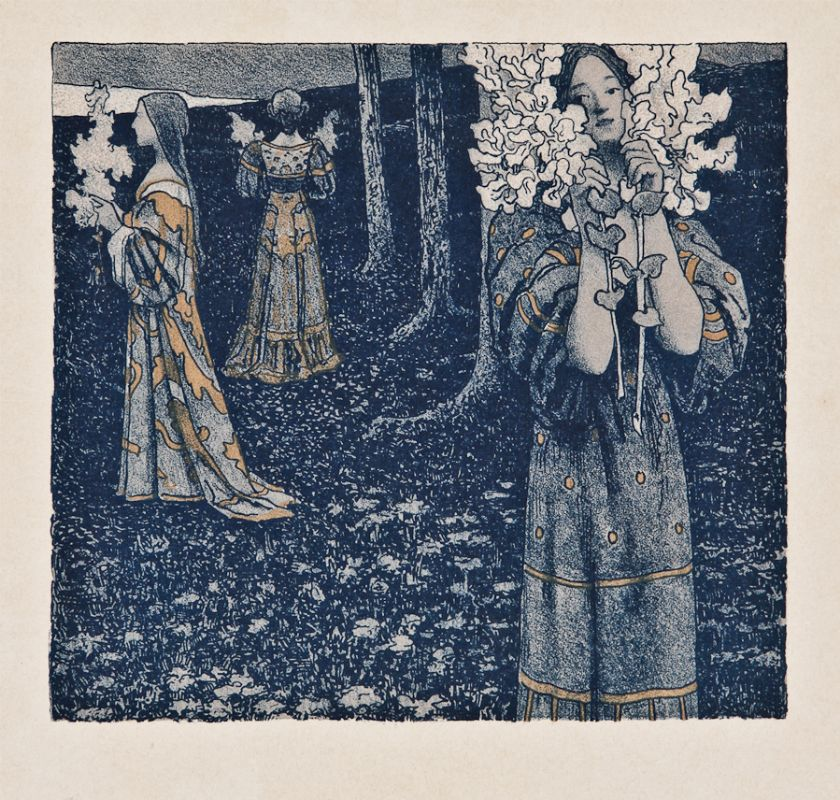
Young women with flowers (1898). Lithograph for Ver Sacrum

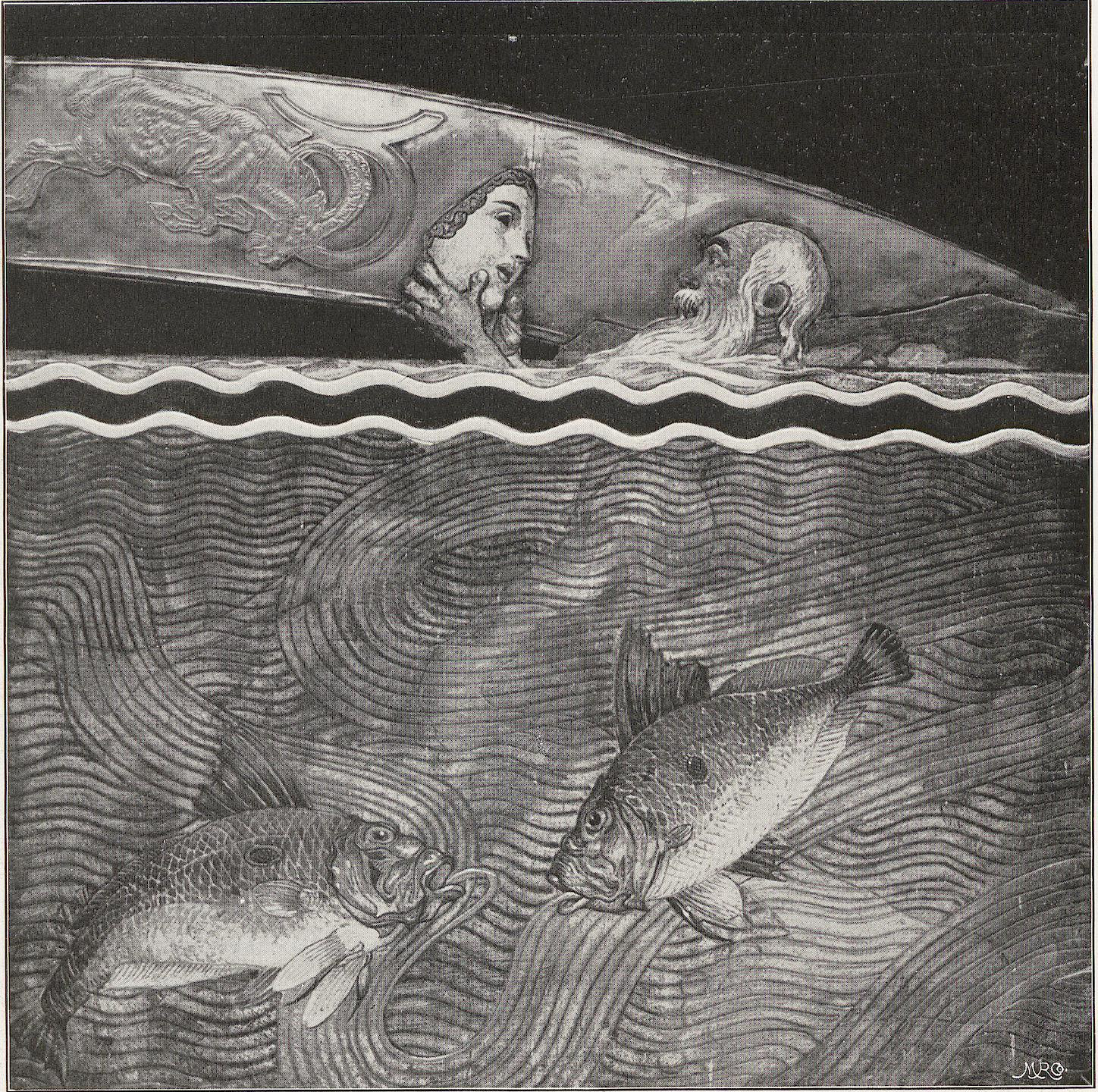
Intarsia in beaten brass from the Fourteenth Exhibition (1902)

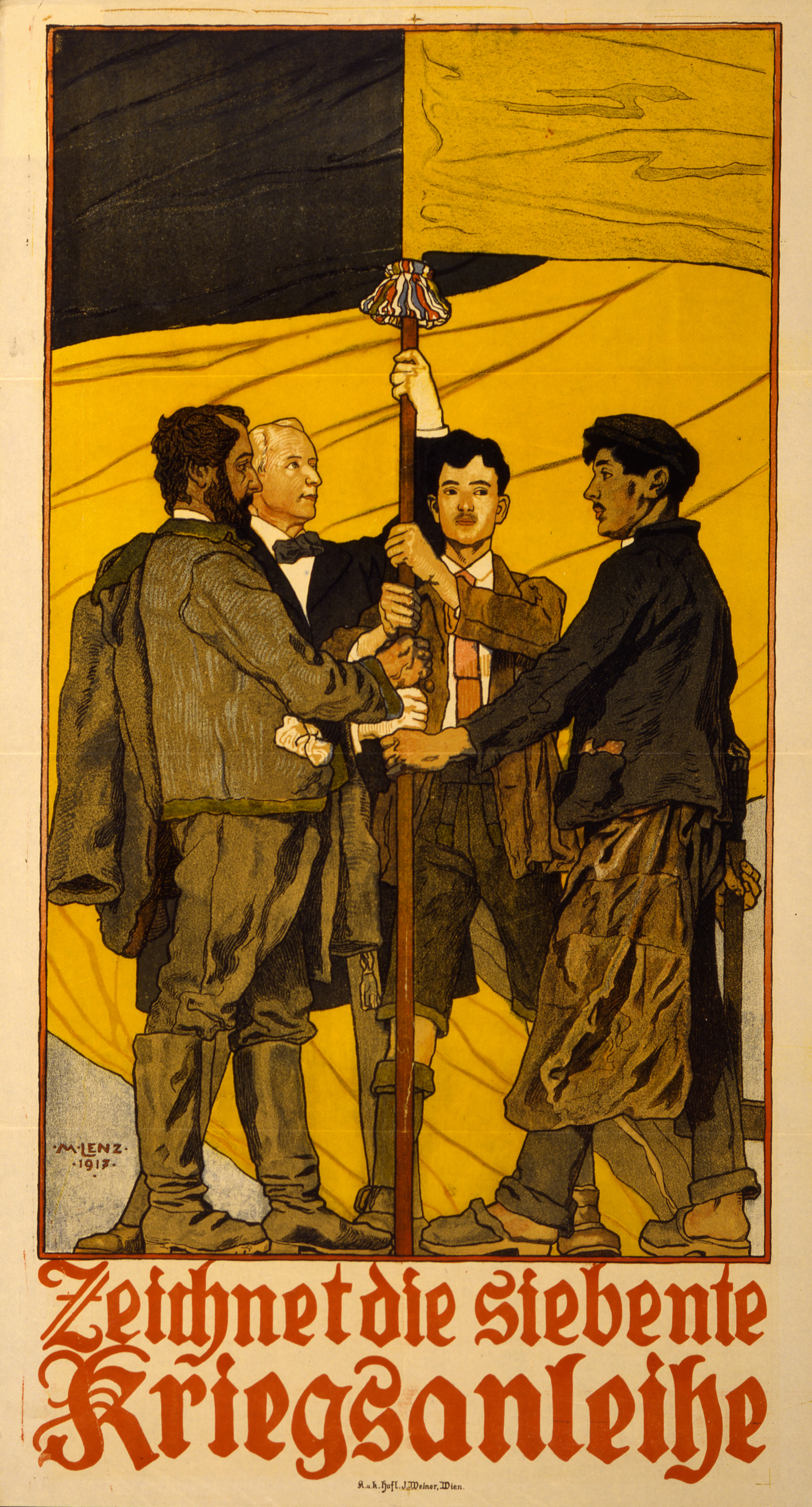
Another war bonds poster (1917)

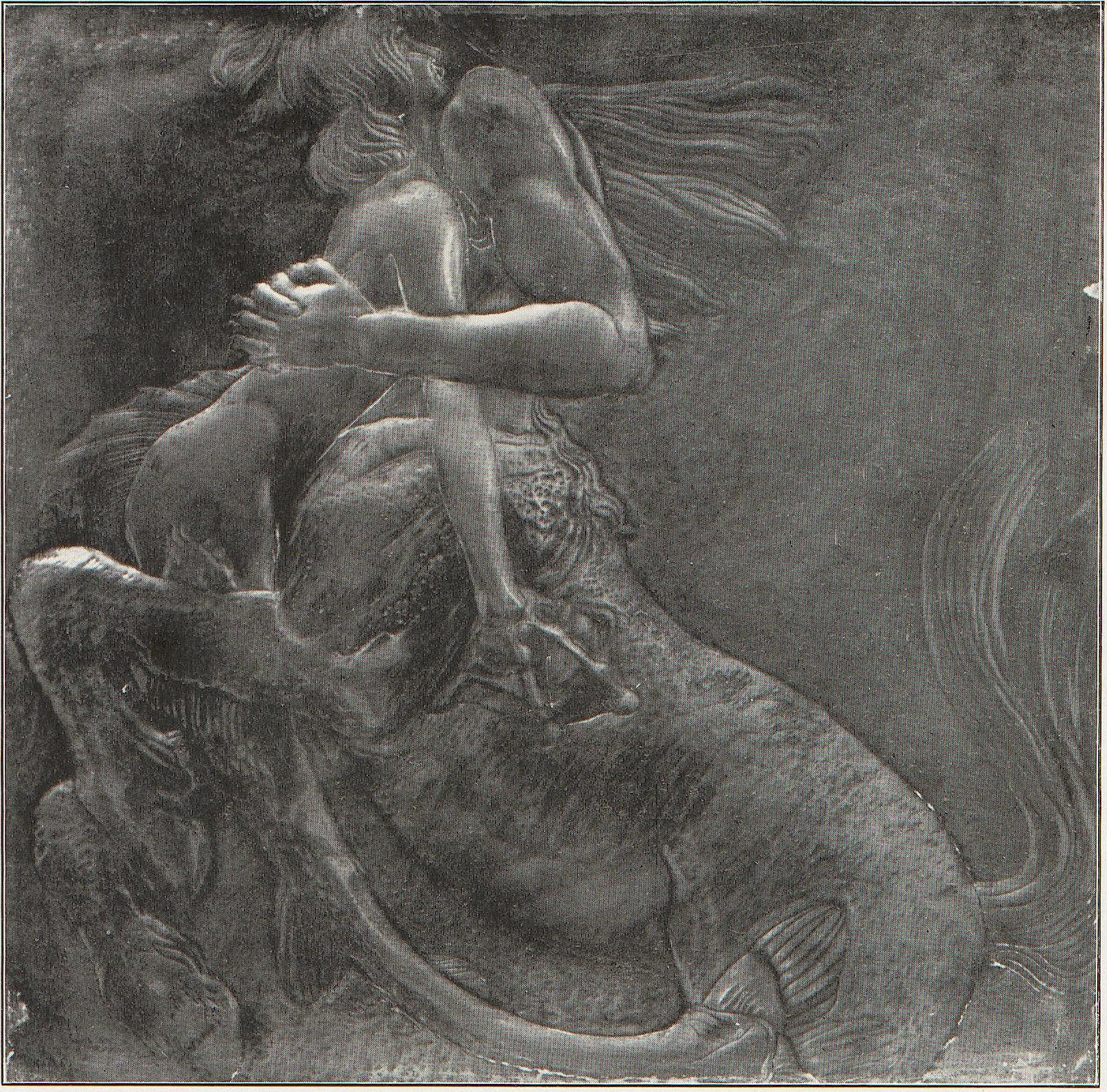
Copper relief shown at the Fourteenth Exhibition (1902)

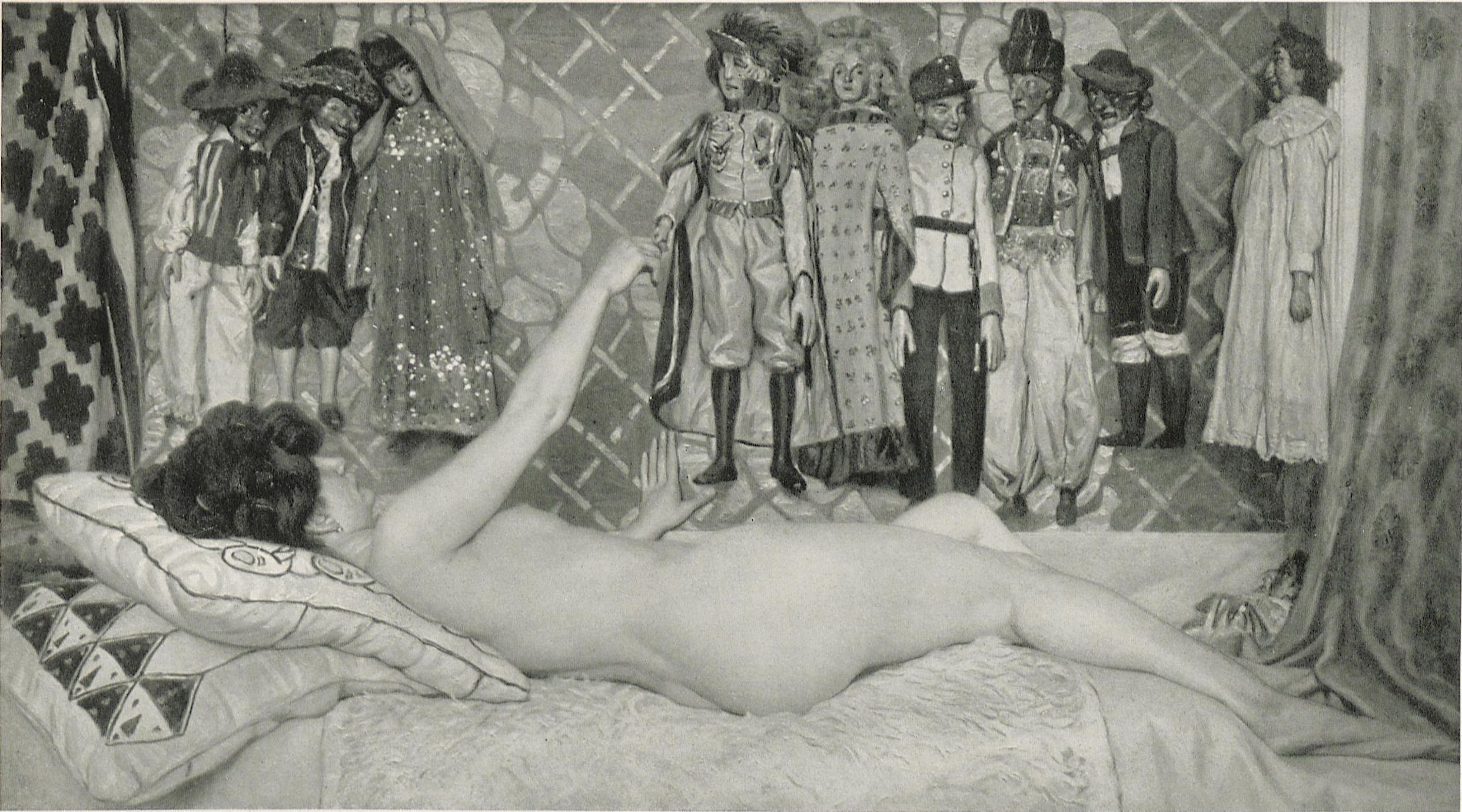
Marionnetes (c. 1909)

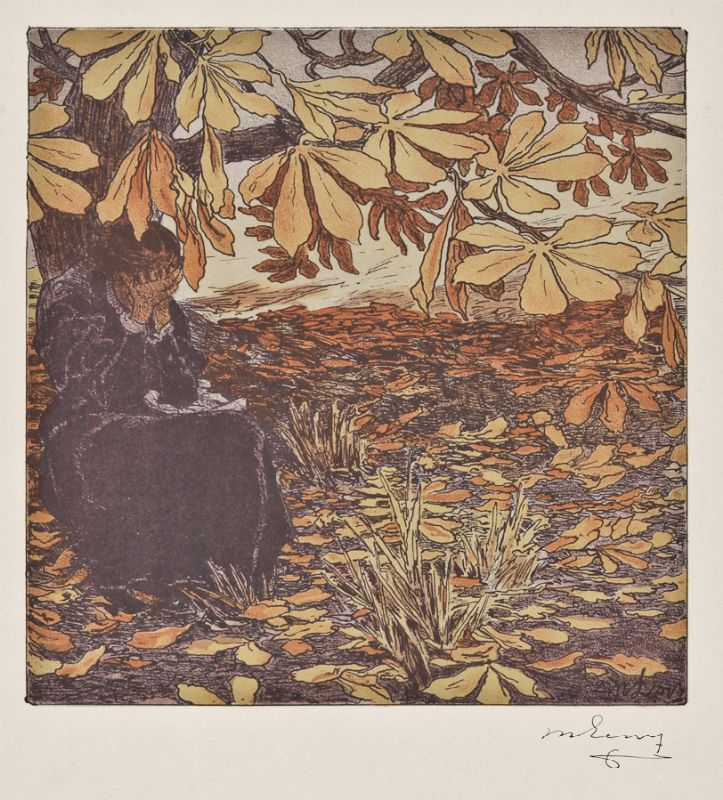
Crying woman sat under a tree (1898). Lithograph for Ver Sacrum

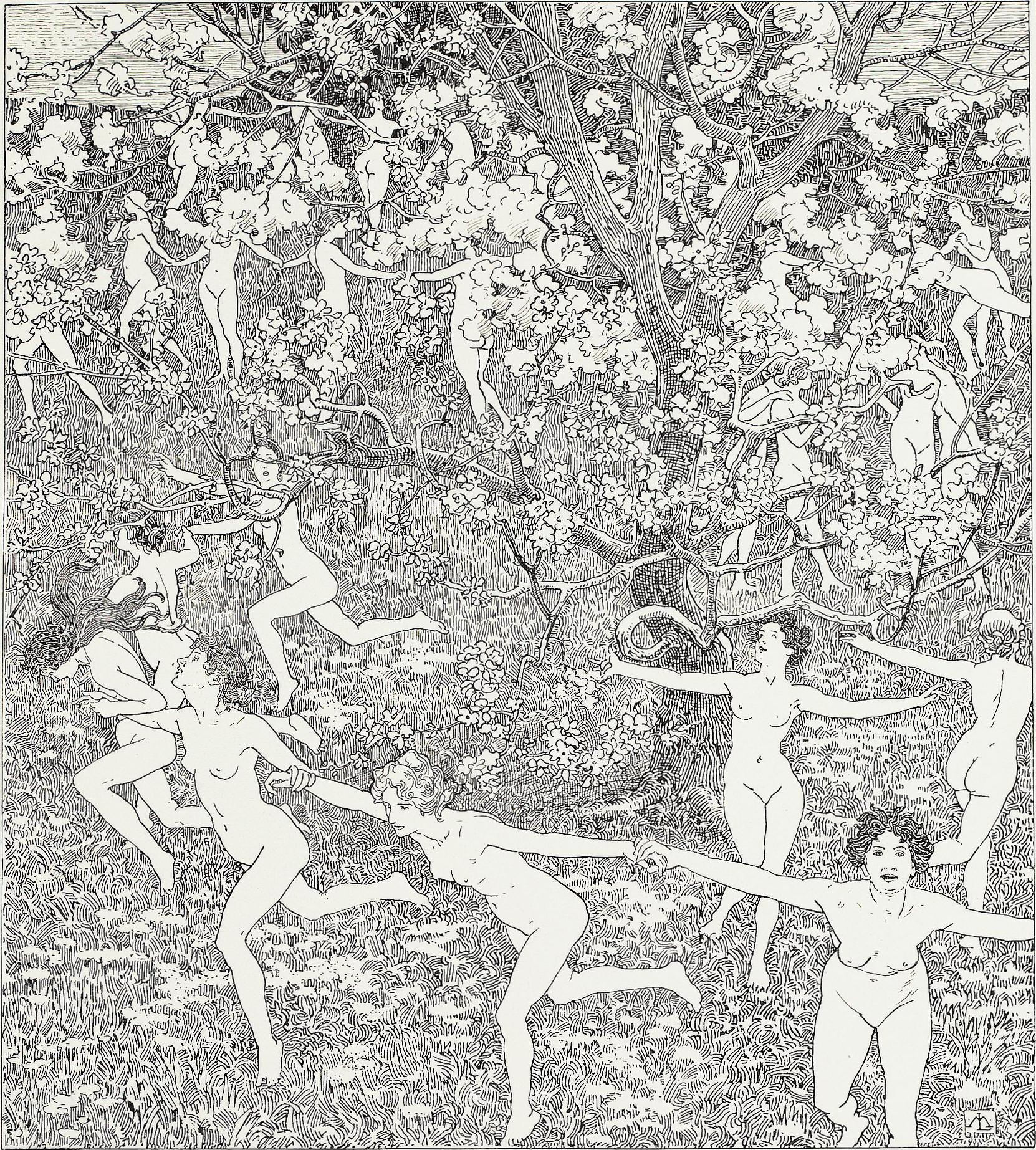
Spring Yearning (1898). Illustration for Ver Sacrum

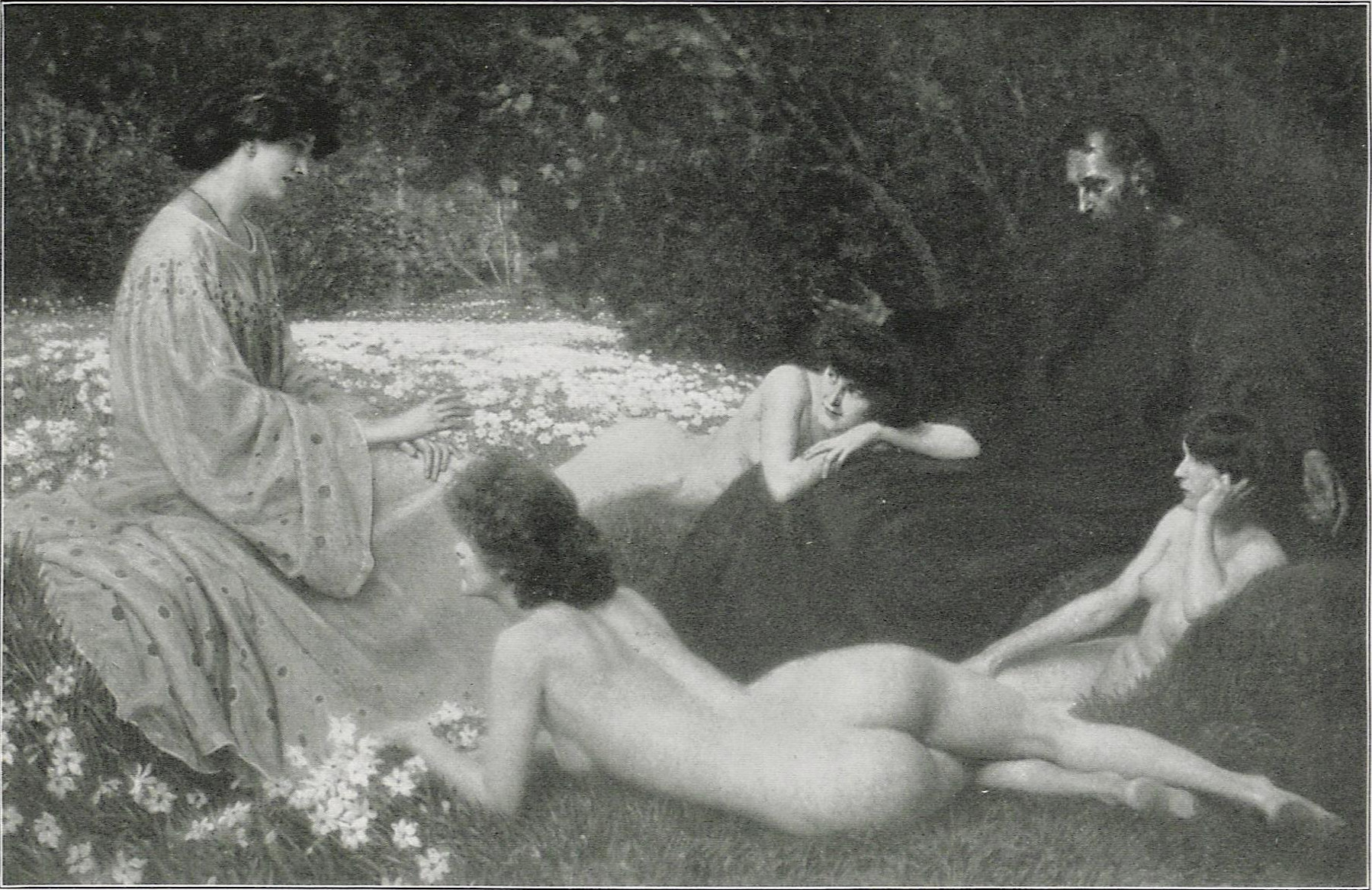
The Forest King and the Wailing Maiden (c. 1907)
