= Manuel Lenz =

German footballer

Personal information
- Date of birth: 23 October 1984 (age 42)
- Place of birth: Herne, West Germany
- Height: 1.94 m (6 ft 4 in)
- Position: Goalkeeper

Team information
- Current team: Rot-Weiss Essen (goalkeeper coach)

Youth career
- –1997: SV Sodingen
- 1997–2000: VfL Bochum
- 2000–2003: Schalke 04

Senior career*
Years	Team	Apps	(Gls)
2003–2005	Schalke 04 II		
2005–2007	Wuppertaler SV Borussia	9	(0)
2007–2010	Rot Weiss Ahlen	51	(0)
2010–2011	Preußen Münster	7	(0)
2011–2012	KFC Uerdingen 05	31	(0)
2012–2014	SSVg Velbert 02	68	(0)
2014–2016	Hammer SpVg	34	(0)

Managerial career
- 2016–: Rot-Weiss Essen (goalkeeper coach)
- * Club domestic league appearances and goals

Manuel Lenz (born 23 October 1984) is a German former footballer and the goalkeeper coach for Rot-Weiss Essen.
