= List of Gunsmoke cast members =

Gunsmoke is an American radio and television Western drama series created by director Norman Macdonnell and writer John Meston. It centered on Dodge City, Kansas, in the 1870s, during the settlement of the American West. The central character is lawman Marshal Matt Dillon, played by William Conrad on radio and James Arness on television.

The radio series ran from 1952 to 1961. John Dunning wrote that, among radio drama enthusiasts, "Gunsmoke is routinely placed among the best shows of any kind and any time." It ran unsponsored for its first few years, with CBS funding its production.

In 1955, the series was adapted for television and ran for 20 seasons. It ran for half-hour episodes from 1955 to 1961, and one-hour episodes from 1961 to 1975. A total of 635 episodes were aired over its 20-year run.

== Radio cast ==
=== Regulars ===
- William Conrad as Matt Dillon
- Parley Baer as Chester Wesley Proudfoot
- Howard McNear as Doc Adams
- Georgia Ellis as Kitty Russell

=== Recurring ===
While the radio series had relatively few recurring supporting characters, and those roles were often shared, the following actors played recurring roles with comparative consistency, in addition to a variety of one-time roles

- Harry Bartell played Mr. Hightower
- James Nusser played Moss Grimmick

=== Guest stars ===
Many actors appeared regularly on Gunsmoke, in the majority of episodes, but in a variety of one-shot roles; others were only heard once or twice

- Edgar Barrier
- Jeanne Bates
- Dick Beals
- Frank Cady
- Virginia Christine
- Hans Conried
- Richard Deacon
- John Dehner
- Don Diamond
- Lawrence Dobkin
- Sam Edwards
- Paul Frees
- Virginia Gregg
- Jerry Hausner
- Joseph Kearns
- Jack Kruschen
- John McIntire
- Junius Matthews
- Ralph Moody
- Jeanette Nolan
- Vic Perrin
- Barney Phillips
- Peggy Rea
- Victor Rodman
- John Stephenson
- James Westerfield

== TV cast ==
=== Main cast ===
Character	Actress / Actor	Seasons																			
Character	Actress / Actor	1	2	3	4	5	6	7	8	9	10	11	12	13	14	15	16	17	18	19	20
Matt Dillon	James Arness	Main	Main	Main	Main	Main	Main	Main	Main	Main	Main	Main	Main	Main	Main	Main	Main	Main	Main	Main	Main
Kitty Russell	Amanda Blake	Main	Main	Main	Main	Main	Main	Main	Main	Main	Main	Main	Main	Main	Main	Main	Main	Main	Main	Main	
Doc Galen Adams	Milburn Stone	Main	Main	Main	Main	Main	Main	Main	Main	Main	Main	Main	Main	Main	Main	Main	Main	Main	Main	Main	Main
Chester Goode	Dennis Weaver	Main	Main	Main	Main	Main	Main	Main	Main	Main											
Sam Noonan	Glenn Strange							Main	Main	Main	Main	Main	Main	Main	Main	Main	Main	Main	Main	Main	
Quint Asper	Burt Reynolds								Main	Main	Main										
Festus Haggen	Ken Curtis										Main	Main	Main	Main	Main	Main	Main	Main	Main	Main	Main
Thaddeus Greenwood	Roger Ewing											Main	Main								
Newly O'Brien	Buck Taylor													Main	Main	Main	Main	Main	Main	Main	Main

=== Recurring characters ===
Character	Actress / Actor	Seasons																			
Character	Actress / Actor	1	2	3	4	5	6	7	8	9	10	11	12	13	14	15	16	17	18	19	20
Howie (hotel clerk)	Howard Culver	Recurring	Recurring	Recurring	Recurring		Recurring	Recurring	Recurring	Recurring	Recurring	Recurring	Recurring	Recurring	Recurring	Recurring	Recurring	Recurring	Recurring	Recurring	Recurring
Mr. Jonas	Dabbs Greer	Recurring		Recurring	Recurring	Recurring	Recurring	Recurring	Recurring	Recurring		Guest		Guest							
Moss Grimmick (livery owner)	George Selk	Recurring	Recurring	Recurring	Recurring	Recurring	Recurring	Recurring	Recurring	Recurring											
Jim Buck (townsman)	Robert Brubaker			Recurring	Recurring	Recurring	Recurring	Recurring	Recurring												
Rudy (townsman)	Rudy Sooter						Recurring	Recurring	Recurring	Recurring	Recurring	Recurring	Recurring	Recurring							
Louie Pheeters (town drunk)	James Nusser							Recurring	Recurring	Recurring	Recurring	Recurring	Recurring	Recurring	Recurring	Recurring		Guest			
Hank Miller (livery manager)	Hank Patterson							Recurring	Recurring	Recurring	Recurring	Recurring	Recurring	Recurring			Recurring	Recurring	Recurring	Recurring	
Ma Smalley (boarding house owner)	Sarah Selby							Recurring	Recurring	Recurring			Recurring					Recurring			
Mr. Bodkin (bank manager)	Roy Roberts								Recurring	Recurring	Recurring	Recurring	Recurring		Recurring	Recurring			Recurring	Recurring	
Nathan Burke (freight office manager)	Ted Jordan										Recurring	Recurring			Recurring	Recurring		Recurring		Recurring	
Mr. Lathrop	Woodrow Chambliss											Recurring	Recurring	Recurring	Recurring	Recurring	Recurring	Recurring	Recurring	Recurring	Recurring
Barney (telegrapher)	Charles Seel											Recurring	Recurring	Recurring	Recurring	Recurring	Recurring	Recurring	Recurring	Recurring	Recurring
Ed Halligan (townsman)	Charles Wagenheim											Recurring	Recurring	Recurring	Recurring			Recurring	Recurring	Recurring	Recurring
Percy Crump (undertaker)	Kelton Garwood											Recurring	Recurring	Recurring	Recurring	Recurring			Recurring		
Ed O'Connor	Tom Brown													Recurring	Recurring	Recurring		Recurring	Recurring	Recurring	
Bull (bartender)	Victor Izay																Recurring	Recurring	Recurring	Recurring	Recurring
Judge Brooker	Herb Vigran																Recurring	Recurring	Recurring	Recurring	Recurring
Dr. John Chapman	Pat Hingle																	Recurring			
Floyd (bartender)	Robert Brubaker																			Recurring	Recurring
Hannah	Fran Ryan																				Recurring

=== Guest stars ===
==== Award winners and nominees ====
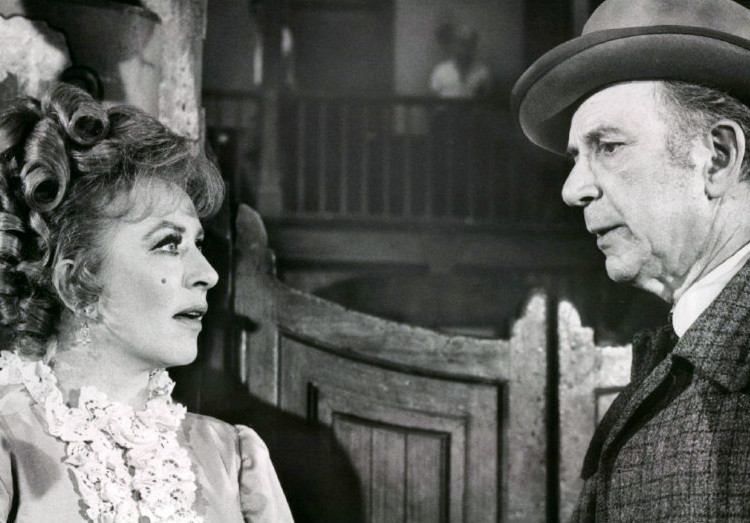
Amanda Blake and Jack Albertson, 1969

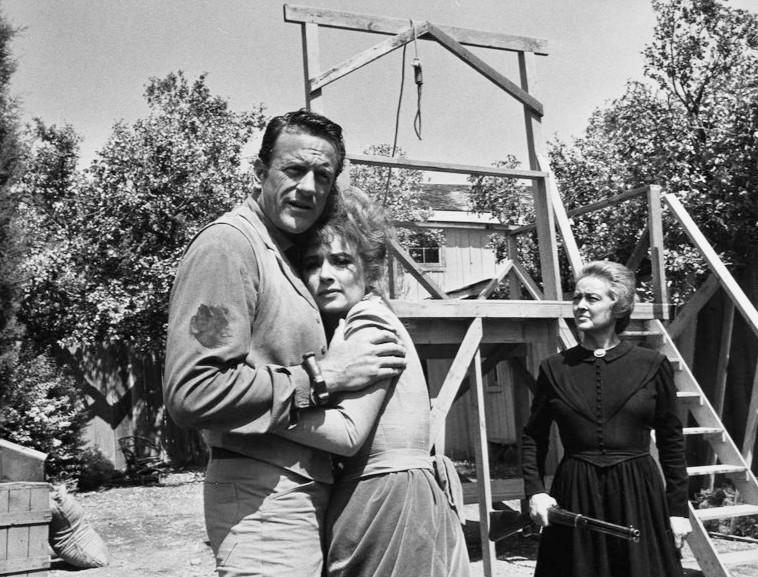
Guest star Bette Davis, 1966

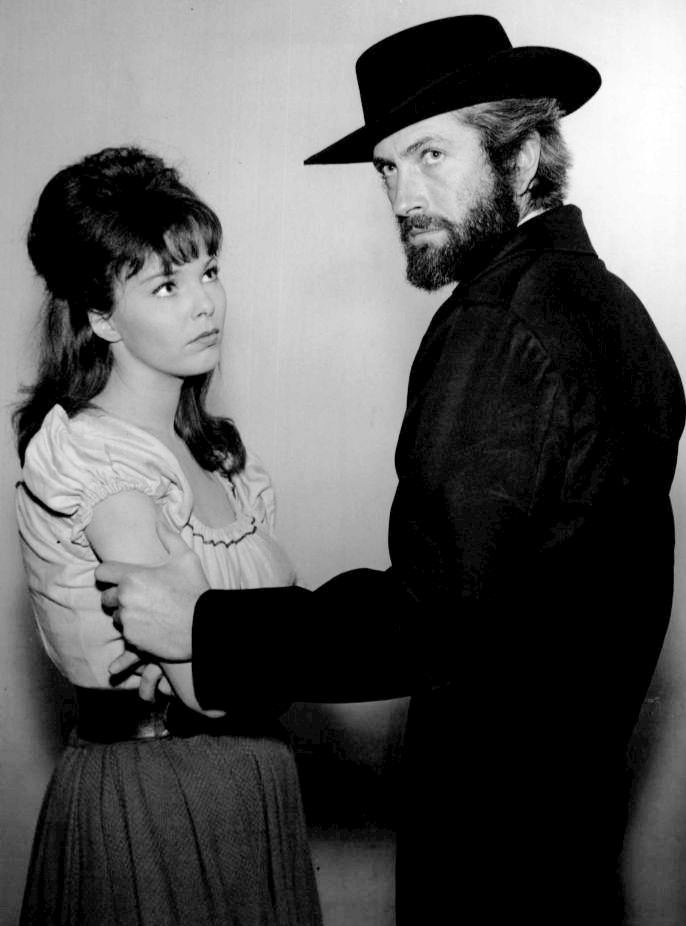
Guest stars Anne Helm and John Drew Barrymore, 1964

During its twenty year run, Gunsmoke's guest stars included numerous established award winning actors. Among them were several Academy Award winners, including Jack Albertson, Ed Begley, Ellen Burstyn, Bette Davis, Eileen Heckart, Kim Hunter, Ben Johnson, George Kennedy, Cloris Leachman, and Mercedes McCambridge.

Other guest stars were Academy Award nominees, including Jean Arthur, Lew Ayres, Ralph Bellamy, Theodore Bikel, Beulah Bondi, Dyan Cannon, Lynn Carlin, Jack Cassidy, Stanley Clements, Lee J. Cobb, Ellen Corby, Nina Foch, Vincent Gardenia, Thomas Gomez, Arthur Hunnicutt, John Ireland, Richard Jaeckel, John Kerr, John Marley, Ron Moody, J. Carroll Naish, Nancy Olson, Katharine Ross, Alfred Ryder, Cicely Tyson, Jon Voight, James Whitmore, and Chill Wills.

Emmy award winning guest stars included Jack Albertson, Ed Asner, Ellen Corby, James Daly, Cloris Leachman, Michael Learned, Kathleen Nolan, Caroll O'Connor, Milburn Stone, and Frank Sutton. Tony award winning guest stars included Ed Begley, Ralph Bellamy, Ellen Burstyn, Vincent Gardenia, Richard Kiley, David Wayne, and Fritz Weaver.

==== Other series stars ====
Several guest stars on Gunsmoke went on later to star in their own Westerns.

- Dan Blocker, Bonanza
- Charles Bronson, Empire, The Travels of Jaimie McPheeters
- Chuck Connors, The Rifleman, Branded
- Pat Conway, Tombstone Territory
- James Drury, The Virginian
- Andrew Duggan, Lancer
- Jack Elam, The Dakotas, Temple Houston
- Jack Kelly, Maverick
- Pernell Roberts, Bonanza
- Read Morgan, The Deputy
- Stuart Whitman, Cimarron Strip

==== Badmen ====
Gunsmoke's guest stars often included actors known for playing Western badmen, or "heavies". Some of these were actors from A or B Westerns, others were aging stuntmen. Some of the heavies that guest starred on Gunsmoke were among the following:

- James Anderson
- John Anderson
- Richard Anderson
- Morris Ankrum
- R. G. Armstrong
- Jacques Aubuchon
- Roy Barcroft
- Trevor Bardette
- Rayford Barnes
- Hal Baylor
- Lyle Bettger
- Robert Bice
- Lane Bradford
- Neville Brand
- David Brian
- Yakima Canutt
- Anthony Caruso
- Lane Chandler
- George Chesebro
- John Cliff
- Michael Conrad
- John Crawford
- Royal Dano
- Jim Davis
- Ted De Corsia
- John Dehner
- Bruce Dern
- Richard Devon
- John Doucette
- Gene Evans
- Victor French
- Leo Gordon
- James Griffith
- Kevin Hagen
- Don Haggerty
- Ron Hayes
- Rex Holman
- Arch Johnson
- L. Q. Jones
- Victor Jory
- DeForest Kelley
- Douglas Kennedy
- George Keymas
- Jack Lambert
- John Larch
- Harry Lauter
- Ken Lynch
- George Macready
- Peter Mamakos
- Don Megowan
- Robert Middleton
- John Milford
- Mort Mills
- Gregg Palmer
- Tex Palmer
- Michael Pate
- Bill Phipps
- John Pickard
- Denver Pyle
- Tom Reese
- Paul Richards
- Bing Russell
- Mickey Simpson
- William Smith
- Harold Stone
- Kelly Thordsen
- Lee Van Cleef
- Dan White
- Peter Whitney
- Robert Wilke
- Adam Williams
- Bob Woodward
- Morgan Woodward
- H. M. Wynant

==== Other guest stars (Note: Unless noted otherwise, all listed guest cast is verified by Lentz (1996): Western and Frontier Film and Television Credits 1903-1995, pp 1601-1623.) ====
- John Abbott
- Bettye Ackerman
- Mary Adams
- Stanley Adams
- Claude Akins
- Marc Alaimo
- Mabel Albertson
- Mario Alcalde
- Norman Alden
- Fred Aldrich
- Sheldon Allman
- Robert Anderson
- Keith Andes
- Edward Andrews
- Tige Andrews
- Michael Ansara
- Lou Antonio
- Todd Armstrong
- John Astin
- Malcolm Atterbury
- Barry Atwater
- Jim Backus
- Raymond Bailey
- Joe Don Baker
- Ed Bakey
- Baynes Barron
- Michael Barrier
- Norman Bartold
- Harry Basch
- Richard Basehart
- Ned Beatty
- John Beck
- Noah Beery Jr.
- Ray Bennett
- Warren Berlinger
- James Best
- Carl Betz
- Ramon Bieri
- Billie Bird
- Cal Bolder
- Sorrell Booke
- Nesdon Booth
- Bruce Boxleitner
- William Boyett
- Ray Boyle
- Rudy Bowman
- Stewart Bradley
- Scott Brady
- Eric Braeden
- John Brandon
- Hank Brandt
- Peter Breck
- Beau Bridges
- Morgan Brittany
- Joshua Bryant
- Edgar Buchanan
- Joyce Bulifant
- Brooke Bundy
- Michael Burns
- Robert Burr
- Norman Burton
- Robert Burton
- Gary Busey
- Billy Green Bush
- Sebastian Cabot
- Frank Cady
- Howard Caine
- Anthony Call
- Joseph Campanella
- William Campbell
- J. D. Cannon
- Harry Carey Jr.
- Paul Carr
- David Carradine
- John Carradine
- Conlan Carter
- John Carter
- Allen Case
- Albert Cavens
- Spencer Chan
- James Chandler
- Virginia Christine
- Phyllis Coates
- Julie Cobb
- Fred Coby
- John Colicos
- Míriam Colón
- Christopher Connelly
- Mike Connors
- Tim Considine
- Elisha Cook Jr.
- Bill Coontz
- Charles Cooper
- Glenn Corbett
- Gretchen Corbett
- Jeff Corey
- Robert Cornthwaite
- Aneta Corsaut
- Dennis Cross
- Robert Culp
- Kim Darby
- Henry Darrow
- Richard Deacon
- Gloria DeHaven
- Joe De Santis
- William Devane
- Alan Dexter
- George DiCenzo
- Angie Dickinson
- Charles Dierkop
- Lawrence Dobkin
- Burt Douglas
- Jerry Douglas
- Richard Dreyfuss
- Don Dubbins
- John Dullaghan
- Liam Dunn
- Robert Easton
- Buddy Ebsen
- Barbara Eden
- Dana Elcar
- Robert Ellenstein
- Michael Emmet
- Jena Engstrom
- Bill Erwin
- Jason Evers
- Diana Ewing
- Pamelyn Ferdin
- John Fiedler
- Eddie Firestone
- Shug Fisher
- Duke Fishman
- Paul Fix
- Jay C. Flippen
- Constance Ford
- Harrison Ford
- Michael Forest
- Steve Forrest
- Jodie Foster
- Robert Foulk
- Anne Francis
- Bert Freed
- Alan Fudge
- Beverly Garland
- Leif Garrett
- Will Geer
- Stefan Gierasch
- Melissa Gilbert
- Gwynne Gilford
- Sam Gilman
- Ray Girardin
- Ned Glass
- Mark Goddard
- Harold Gould
- Steve Gravers
- Julie Gregg
- James Gregory
- Sam Groom
- Raymond Guth
- Herman Hack
- Joan Hackett
- Sid Haig
- Alan Hale Jr.
- Murray Hamilton
- Chick Hannan
- Jerry Hardin
- Mariette Hartley
- Edmund Hashim
- Johnny Haymer
- Katherine Helmond
- Tom Hennesy
- Chuck Hicks
- Joe Higgins
- Marianna Hill
- Robert Hinkle
- Michael Hinn
- Robert Hogan
- Victor Holchak
- Earl Holliman
- Dennis Hopper
- William Hopper
- Clint Howard
- Ron Howard
- Clyde Howdy
- Hoke Howell
- Clegg Hoyt
- John Hoyt
- David Huddleston
- Marsha Hunt
- Josephine Hutchinson
- Betty Hutton
- Diana Hyland
- Steve Ihnat
- Sherry Jackson
- Anthony James
- Brion James
- Clifton James
- Peter Jason
- Salome Jens
- Roy Jenson
- James Jeter
- Russell Johnson
- I. Stanford Jolley
- Henry Jones
- Ray Jones
- Katherine Justice
- Robert Karnes
- Don Keefer
- William Kendis
- Adam Kennedy
- Sandy Kenyon
- Wright King
- Jess Kirkpatrick
- Werner Klemperer
- Jack Klugman
- Ted Knight
- Yaphet Kotto
- Martin Kove
- Lou Krugman
- Kay E. Kuter
- Diane Ladd
- Ethan Laidlaw
- Martin Landau
- Sue Ane Langdon
- Robert Lansing
- John Lasell
- Louise Latham
- Anna Lee
- Ruta Lee
- Lance LeGault
- Mark Lenard
- Kay Lenz
- Geoffrey Lewis
- George Lindsey
- Joanne Linville
- Jonathan Lippe
- June Lockhart
- Gary Lockwood
- Robert Loggia
- Jack Lord
- Jon Lormer
- Tom Lowell
- Karl Lukas
- Keye Luke
- BarBara Luna
- Herbert Lytton
- Barton MacLane
- Darren McGavin
- Gloria McGehee
- Wayne McLaren
- John McLiam
- Howard McNear
- Gerald McRaney
- Arthur Malet
- Lee Majors
- Kenneth Mars
- Lynne Marta
- Arlene Martel
- Ross Martin
- Strother Martin
- Charles Maxwell
- Rose Marie
- Scott Marlowe
- Ken Mayer
- Rod McGaughy
- Joseph Mell
- Troy Melton
- Judi Meredith
- Vera Miles
- Denny Miller
- Donna Mills
- Frank Mills
- Cameron Mitchell
- Ricardo Montalbán
- Harry Morgan
- Dorothy Morris
- Diana Muldaur
- Richard Mulligan
- Burt Mustin
- Anna Navarro
- Gene Nelson
- Lois Nettleton
- Leslie Nielsen
- Leonard Nimoy
- Jimmy Noel
- Nick Nolte
- France Nuyen
- J. Pat O'Malley
- Simon Oakland
- Warren Oates
- Richard O'Brien
- Tim O'Connor
- James O'Rear
- Gerald S. O'Laughlin
- Susan Oliver
- James Olson
- John Orchard
- Woodrow Parfrey
- John Payne
- Leo Penn
- Gigi Perreau
- Vic Perrin
- Nehemiah Persoff
- Brock Peters
- George O. Petrie
- Robert Phillips
- Slim Pickens
- Robert Pine
- Ed Platt
- Suzanne Pleshette
- Michael J. Pollard
- Judson Pratt
- Andrew Prine
- Mike Ragan
- Ford Rainey
- Chips Rafferty
- Dack Rambo
- Gilman Rankin
- Sam Reese
- Richard Reeves
- Carl Benton Reid
- John Reilly
- Carl Reindel
- Ray Reinhardt
- Jack Reitzen
- Ken Renard
- Stafford Repp
- Alejandro Rey
- Madlyn Rhue
- Peter Mark Richman
- Stephen Roberts
- Elizabeth Rogers
- Wayne Rogers
- Gilbert Roland
- Ruth Roman
- Andy Romano
- Robert Rothwell
- Al Ruscio
- Kurt Russell
- Gene Rutherford
- Willard Sage
- Albert Salmi
- Steve Sandor
- Cosmo Sardo
- Dick Sargent
- John Saxon
- William Schallert
- John Schuck
- Alex Sharp
- Karen Sharpe
- William Shatner
- Jacqueline Scott
- Gregory Sierra
- Tom Simcox
- Joseph Sirola
- Tom Skerritt
- Hal Smith
- Quentin Sondergaard
- David Soul
- Olan Soule
- George Sowards
- Aaron Spelling
- Don Spruance
- Harry Dean Stanton
- Craig Stevens
- Paul Stevens
- Warren Stevens
- Charlotte Stewart (aka Charlotte Considine)
- Marianne Stewart
- Paul Stewart
- Guy Stockwell
- Leonard Stone
- Fred Stromsoe
- Don Stroud
- Liam Sullivan
- Hope Summers
- Neil Summers
- Karl Swenson
- Loretta Swit
- Ken Swofford
- Gloria Talbott
- William Talman
- Russ Tamblyn
- Vic Tayback
- Dub Taylor
- Guy Teague
- Roy Thinnes
- Jack Tornek
- Arthur Tovey
- Brad Trumbull
- H. T. Tsiang
- Forrest Tucker
- Robert Urich
- Joan Van Ark
- Joyce Van Patten
- Vince Van Patten
- Robert Vaughn
- John Vernon
- Jan-Michael Vincent
- Jess Walton
- Lesley Ann Warren
- Ruth Warrick
- Jesse Wayne
- Richard Webb
- Judi West
- Johnny Whitaker
- Grace Lee Whitney
- Collin Wilcox
- Guinn Williams
- Noble Willingham
- William Windom
- Marie Windsor
- Jason Wingreen
- Michael Witney
- Venita Wolf
- Meg Wyllie
- Dana Wynter
- Anthony Zerbe

== Sources ==
- Aaker, Everett (25 May 2017). Television Western Players, 1960-1975: A Biographical Dictionary. McFarland. ISBN 9781476662503.
- Brooks, Tim; Marsh, Earle (1988). The Complete Directory to Prime Time Network TV Shows, 1946-present. Ballantine Books. ISBN 978-0-345-35610-9.
- Dunning, John (1998-05-07). On the Air: The Encyclopedia of Old-Time Radio. Oxford University Press. ISBN 978-0-19-507678-3 – via Google Books.
- Fitzgerald, Michael G.; Magers, Boyd (2006-02-16). Ladies of the Western: Interviews with Fifty-One More Actresses from the Silent Era to the Television Westerns of the 1950s and 1960s. McFarland. ISBN 978-0-7864-2656-0.
- Freese, Gene Scott (April 10, 2014). Hollywood Stunt Performers, 1910s-1970s: A Biographical Dictionary, 2d ed. McFarland. p. 55. ISBN 9780786476435 – via Google Books.
- Hampes, William (2019-03-11). Cowboy Courage: Westerns and the Portrayal of Bravery. McFarland. ISBN 978-1-4766-3523-1.
- Lentz, Harris M. (1997). Television Westerns Episode Guide: All United States Series, 1949-1996. McFarland & Company. ISBN 9780786403776.
- Lentz, Harris M. (1996). Western and Frontier Film and Television Credits 1903-1995. McFarland. ISBN 978-0-7864-0217-5.
- Magers, Boyd; Nareau, Bob; Copeland, Bobby (2005). Best of the Badmen: Polecats, Varmints, and Desperadoes of Western Films. Madison, North Carolina: Empire Publishing. ISBN 978-0-944019-43-6.
- Marill, Alvin H. (2011-06-01). Television Westerns: Six Decades of Sagebrush Sheriffs, Scalawags, and Sidewinders. Plymouth, UK: Scarecrow Press. ISBN 978-0-8108-8133-4.
- Schuster, Hal (1989). The Gunsmoke Years. Las Vegas, Nevada: Pioneer Books. ISBN 1-55698-221-6.
- Ward, Jack (1993). Television Guest Stars: An Illustrated Career Chronicle for 678 Performers of the Sixties and Seventies. McFarland. p. 267. ISBN 9780899508078 – via Google Books.
- Yoggy, Gary A. (1995). Riding the Video Range: The Rise and Fall of the Western on Television. McFarland. ISBN 978-0-7864-0021-8.
