= Gunsmoke season 14 =

Gunsmoke
- Season 14
- Starring: James Arness; Ken Curtis; Milburn Stone; Amanda Blake; Buck Taylor
- No. of episodes: 26

Release
- Original network: CBS
- Original release: September 23, 1968 – March 24, 1969

Season chronology
- ← Previous; Season 13 Next → Season 15

Gunsmoke is an American Western television series developed by Charles Marquis Warren and based on the radio program of the same name. The series ran for 20 seasons, making it the longest-running Western in television history.

The first episode of season 14 aired in the United States on September 23, 1968, and the final episode aired on March 24, 1969. All episodes were broadcast in the U.S. by CBS.

Season 14 of Gunsmoke was the third season of color episodes. Previous seasons were filmed in black-and-white.

== Synopsis ==
Gunsmoke is set in and around Dodge City, Kansas, in the post-Civil War era and centers on United States Marshal Matt Dillon (James Arness) as he enforces law and order in the city. In its original format, the series also focuses on Dillon's friendship with deputy Festus Haggen (Ken Curtis); Doctor Galen "Doc" Adams (Milburn Stone), the town's physician; Kitty Russell (Amanda Blake), saloon girl and later owner of the Long Branch Saloon; and deputy Newly O'Brien (Buck Taylor).

== Cast and characters ==
=== Main ===
- James Arness as Matt Dillon
- Milburn Stone as Doc
- Amanda Blake as Kitty
- Glenn Strange as Sam Noonan
- Ken Curtis as Festus
- Buck Taylor as Newly

== Production ==
Season 14 consisted of 26 one-hour color episodes produced by John Mantley and associate producer Joseph Dackow.

=== Casting ===
Episode 19, "The Mark of Cain", cast Robert Totten as a guest character. Totten directed several episodes as well as writing at least one.

=== Writing ===
Occasionally, titles were re-used. This season had two titles that were used in previous seasons. The first was episode 20, "Reprisal", which was also a title in season 7, episode 23. The second was episode 25, "The Prisoner", which was also a title in season 7, episode 33.

== Episodes ==
No. overall	No. in season	Title	Directed by	Written by	Original release date	Prod. code
464	1	"Lyle's Kid"	Bernard McEveety	Calvin Clements, Sr.	September 23, 1968	0302
A crippled ex-lawman has trained his hesitant son into an incredibly fast gunfighter, so he may face-off with the culprit that maimed him ten years ago.
465	2	"The Hidecutters"	Bernard McEveety	Jack Turley	September 30, 1968	0305
Loathsome hide-cutters shadow a cattle drive and Matt tries to prevent hostilities between the trail boss and the band of rogue thieves.
466	3	"Zavala"	Vincent McEveety	Paul Savage	October 7, 1968	0301
Matt travels to Mexico in search of a fugitive and befriends a young boy, who believes the Marshal can save his village.
467	4	"Uncle Finney"	Bernard McEveety	Calvin Clements, Sr.	October 14, 1968	0311
Two mangy hillbilly half-brothers turn in their horse-thieving 103-year-old uncle for $50 reward to use in an elaborate scheme to rob the freight office.
468	5	"Slocum"	Leo Penn	Ron Bishop	October 21, 1968	0306
Matt's mountain-man friend comes to town and promptly stirs-up trouble, forcing the Marshal to fend-off a vengeful bible-toting, liquor-swilling family.
469	6	"O'Quillian"	John Rich	Ron Bishop	October 28, 1968	0304
Nuisance comes to Dodge in the form of a drunken Irish blowhard, who was found innocent in a Spearville murder and now an agitated Matt must protect him from the dead man's vindictive brother.
470	7	"9:12 to Dodge"	Marvin J. Chomsky	Preston Wood	November 11, 1968	0308
Matt and Doc escort a prisoner back to Dodge on a private railcar, but their safety is jeopardized when passengers and a crusading meddlesome female are allowed to board.
471	8	"Abelia"	Vincent McEveety	Calvin Clements, Sr.	November 18, 1968	0312
Outlaws persuade a young widow to steal medicine for their wounded partner and Festus becomes caught-up in the chaos when he investigates the crime.
472	9	"Railroad!"	Marvin J. Chomsky	Arthur Rowe	November 25, 1968	0314
Matt dukes-it-out with an arrogant railroad boss who's determined to lay track across a furious homesteader's land.
473	10	"The Miracle Man"	Bernard McEveety	Calvin Clements, Sr.	December 2, 1968	0313
An Irish clothing drummer and part-time con-man has heartfelt second thoughts on swindling an attractive farm widow.
474	11	"Waco"	Robert Totten	Ron Bishop	December 9, 1968	0316
Matt escorts a prisoner back to Dodge and is pursued by the outlaw's gang but fate interrupts the journey when they encounter a pregnant Indian girl.
475	12	"Lobo"	Bernard McEveety	Jim Byrnes	December 16, 1968	0315
Matt must hunt down an old friend, a far-ranging wandering mountain man, after he kills two men in a dispute in the handling and respect given to a dead wolf.
476	13	"Johnny Cross"	Herschel Daugherty	Calvin Clements, Sr.	December 23, 1968	0309
In a case of mistaken identity, two scheming bounty hunters pay-off the lone witness of a stagecoach robbery and an innocent young man fights for his freedom.
477	14	"The Money Store"	Vincent McEveety	William Blinn	December 30, 1968	0303
After an impoverished widower is denied a loan, his two children seize upon an opportune moment to steal money from the bank.
478	15	"The Twisted Heritage"	Bernard McEveety	Story by : Robert Heverly and Jack Turley; Screenplay by : Paul Savage and Arthur Rowe	January 6, 1969	0317
Kitty saves the live of a well-to-do stagecoach passenger and becomes emotionally involved with his hurtful mother and neglected daughter.
479	16	"Time of the Jackals"	Vincent McEveety	Story by : Paul Savage; Screenplay by : Paul Savage and Richard Fielder	January 13, 1969	0310
The leader of a notorious outlaw gang breaks out of prison and wants Matt dead which is complicated by a woman from the Marshal's past who's personally involved with three of the offenders.
480	17	"Mannon"	Robert Butler	Ron Bishop	January 20, 1969	0319
Gunfighter Mannon (Steve Forrest), a former Quantrill Raider, comes to Dodge to terrorize the townsfolk before facing Matt in a gunfight.
481	18	"Gold Town"	Gunnar Hellström	Calvin Clements, Sr.	January 27, 1969	0318
Merry Florene (Lane Bradbury) is back, along with her half-brother Elbert Moses (Anthony James) and cousin Smiley (Lou Antonio). Merry pesters Newly while the boys scam Dodge City with a salted gold mine.
482	19	"The Mark of Cain"	Vincent McEveety	Ron Bishop	February 3, 1969	0322
Ex-Union soldier and buffalo hunter Corley (Robert Totten), reveals the true identity of Timothy Driscoll (Nehemiah Persoff), who is Karl Martin Krag, the "Devil of Donneville", a former Confederate Commandant of a Civil War prison camp where hundreds died. Krag is haunted by his past, and now he, his family, his victims, the townsfolk, Matt, and the U.S. Attorney General must decide his ultimate fate.
483	20	"Reprisal"	Bernard McEveety	Story by : Jack Hawn; Screenplay by : Jack Hawn and Paul Savage	February 10, 1969	0321
Doc must choose between delivering the baby of Sara (Eunice Christopher) and Tom Butler (Joe Don Baker), or saving the life of a murderer, Garth (Jack Lambert).
484	21	"The Long Night"	John Rich	Story by : Richard Carr; Screenplay by : Paul Savage	February 17, 1969	0275
A group of bounty hunters led by Guerin (Bruce Dern) hold Kitty, Doc & Louie hostage, intent on getting even with Matt for a 10-year jail term, and denying them a $10,000 bounty on Ben Miller (Robert Totten) who killed the son of Henry Wade (Robert Brubaker) in a fair gunfight.
485	22	"The Night Riders"	Irving J. Moore	Calvin Clements, Sr.	February 24, 1969	0323
Festus faces a group of renegades led by Judge Proctor (Jeff Corey) bent on regaining land they lost during the Civil War.
486	23	"The Intruder"	Vincent McEveety	Jim Byrnes	March 3, 1969	0325
Festus seeks help for his prisoner Riley Sharp (Charles Aidman) at the home of Ellie (Gail Kobe) and Henry Decker (John Kellogg).
487	24	"The Good Samaritans"	Bernard McEveety	Paul Savage	March 10, 1969	0324
A family of former slaves gives Matt shelter when he is injured.
488	25	"The Prisoner"	Leo Penn	Calvin Clements, Sr.	March 17, 1969	0320
Kitty is left in charge of Steven Downing (Jon Voight) who is about to be hanged for the murder of Bob Mathison's (Kenneth Tobey) wife, but Kitty believes that he is innocent and refuses to let another sheriff (Paul Bryar) take him away.
489	26	"Exodus 21:22"	Herschel Daugherty	Arthur Rowe	March 24, 1969	0307
Former lawman Frank Reardon (Steve Ihnat) goes after the men who murdered his wife, leading him into conflict with his friend Matt.

== Release ==
=== Broadcast ===
Season fourteen aired Mondays at 7:30-8:30 pm (EST) on CBS.

=== Home media ===
The fourteenth season was released on DVD by Paramount Home Entertainment in a two volume set on February 5, 2019.

== Reception ==
After a move to a new timeslot the previous season, Gunsmoke season 14 was able to stay in the top 10, securing #6 in the Nielsen ratings.
