= Gunsmoke season 15 =

Gunsmoke
- Season 15
- Starring: James Arness; Ken Curtis; Milburn Stone; Amanda Blake; Buck Taylor
- No. of episodes: 26

Release
- Original network: CBS
- Original release: September 22, 1969 – March 23, 1970

Season chronology
- ← Previous; Season 14 Next → Season 16

Gunsmoke is an American Western television series developed by Charles Marquis Warren and based on the radio program of the same name. The series ran for 20 seasons, making it the longest-running Western in television history.

The first episode of season 15 aired in the United States on September 22, 1969, and the final episode aired on March 23, 1970. All episodes were broadcast in the U.S. by CBS.

Season 15 of Gunsmoke was the fourth season of color episodes. Previous seasons were filmed in black-and-white.

== Synopsis ==
Gunsmoke is set in and around Dodge City, Kansas, in the post-Civil War era and centers on United States Marshal Matt Dillon (James Arness) as he enforces law and order in the city. In its original format, the series also focuses on Dillon's friendship with deputy Festus Haggen (Ken Curtis); Doctor Galen "Doc" Adams (Milburn Stone), the town's physician; Kitty Russell (Amanda Blake), saloon girl and later owner of the Long Branch Saloon; and deputy Newly O'Brien (Buck Taylor).

== Cast and characters ==
=== Main ===
- James Arness as Matt Dillon
- Milburn Stone as Doc
- Amanda Blake as Kitty
- Glenn Strange as Sam Noonan
- Ken Curtis as Festus
- Buck Taylor as Newly

== Production ==
Season 15 consisted of 26 one-hour color episodes produced by John Mantley and associate producer Joseph Dackow.

== Episodes ==
No. overall	No. in season	Title	Directed by	Written by	Original release date	Prod. code
490	1	"The Devil's Outpost"	Philip Leacock	Story by : Bob Barbash; Screenplay by : Bob Barbash and Jim Byrnes	September 22, 1969	0356
Wily outlaw Yancy Tyce (Robert Lansing) is determined to free his younger brother Cody Tyce (Jonathan Lippe) from Matt's custody.
491	2	"Stryker"	Robert Totten	Herman Groves	September 29, 1969	0352
Matt is headed for a showdown with marshal-turned-outlaw Josh Stryker (Morgan Woodward).
492	3	"Coreyville"	Bernard McEveety	Herman Groves	October 6, 1969	0361
Two feuding women, Agatha Corey (Nina Foch) and Flo Watson (Ruth Roman), refuse to reveal the identity of the killer Matt is looking for.
493	4	"Danny (AKA 'The Wake')"	Bernard McEveety	Preston Wood	October 13, 1969	0354
Ailing confidence man Danny Wilson (Jack Albertson) plans one last con, involving a "hit" on Matt, in order to ensure his very short-lived financial future.
494	5	"Hawk"	Gunnar Hellström	Kay Lenard & Jess Carneol	October 20, 1969	0360
Phoebe Clifford (Louise Latham) refuses to acknowledge that an Apache half-breed named Hawk (Brendon Boone) is her son.
495	6	"A Man Called Smith"	Vincent McEveety	Calvin Clements, Sr.	October 27, 1969	0351
Outlaw Will "Smith" (Earl Holliman) arrives at the home of widow Abelia (Jacqueline Scott) to get her to help him launder $10,000 in stolen gold coins.
496	7	"Charlie Noon"	Vincent McEveety	Jim Byrnes	November 3, 1969	0363
Comanches attack Matt, his prisoner Charlie Noon (James Best), an Indian widow (Míriam Colón) and her white stepson Jamie (Ronny Howard).
497	8	"The Still"	Gunnar Hellström	Calvin Clements, Sr.	November 10, 1969	0362
Merry Florene (Lane Bradbury) is back. This time she has a good job as an interim school teacher in Dodge. But when her half-brother Elbert Moses (Anthony James) and her Uncle Titus (Shug Fisher) arrive, she is again in danger of losing her job and her beau from her family's buffoonery.
498	9	"A Matter of Honor"	Robert Totten	Joy Dexter	November 17, 1969	0355
The town drunk, Louie Pheeters (James Nusser), is accused of a murder he witnessed.
499	10	"The Innocent"	Marvin J. Chomsky	Walter Black	November 24, 1969	0353
Missionary teacher Athena Partridge Royce (Eileen Heckart) heads for her first assignment, days away from Dodge, completely oblivious of the dangers out in the wilderness. Festus takes it upon himself to help her along the way.
500	11	"Ring of Darkness"	Bernard McEveety	Arthur Dales^{[C]}	December 1, 1969	0359
Newly is captured, while farmer Ben Hurley (Tom Drake) faces a moral dilemma, stealing horses for a gang of outlaws to help his blind daughter, Susan (Pamela Dunlap)
501	12	"MacGraw"	Philip Leacock	Kay Lenard & Jess Carneol	December 8, 1969	0364
Ex-gunslinger Jake McGraw (J. D. Cannon) has returned to Dodge after twenty years in prison and for some reason has taken an interest in a saloon hostess, Ella Horton (Diana Ewing), and a young cowboy, Dave Wilson (Michael Larrain).
502	13	"Roots of Fear"	Philip Leacock	Arthur Browne, Jr.	December 15, 1969	0366
Dirt farmer Amos Sadler (John Anderson) and his kin plot to break into the bank when it's closed due to a panic.
503	14	"The Sisters"	Philip Leacock	William Kelley	December 29, 1969	0358
A scoundrel, Pack Landers (Jack Elam), tries to con three nuns by using his own children as leverage.
504	15	"The War Priest"	Bernard McEveety	William Kelley	January 5, 1970	0367
Drunken cavalry Sergeant Holly (Forrest Tucker) pursues Apache warrior/priest Gregorio (Richard Anderson) who took Kitty hostage.
505	16	"The Pack Rat"	Philip Leacock	Story by : Arthur Browne, Jr. Teleplay by : Arthur Browne, Jr. and Jim Byrnes	January 12, 1970	0369
A young thief, Sancho (Manuel Padilla Jr.), gets caught by Matt while the marshal is transporting a prisoner, Sam Danton (William C. Watson), to Fort Union.
506	17	"The Judas Gun"	Vincent McEveety	Harry Kronman	January 19, 1970	0365
Hired gunman Boy Avery (Ron Hayes) changes the balance of power in a family feud between Noah Haimes (Richard Slattery) and Clete Bolden (Sean McClory), threatening the happiness of their children, Cully Haimes (Peter Jason) and Janie Bolden (Laurie Mock).
507	18	"Doctor Herman Schultz, M.D."	Bernard McEveety	Story by : Benny Rubin; Teleplay by : Calvin Clements, Sr.	January 26, 1970	0370
Hypnotist Dr. Herman Schultz (Benny Rubin) bamboozles Dodge residents by using his skill to steal money that is destined for the freight office.
508	19	"The Badge"	Vincent McEveety	Jim Byrnes	February 2, 1970	0374
It's the last straw for Kitty. After Matt is shot by two robbers, she boards up the Long Branch and leaves Dodge for Ballard, Oklahoma, only to get caught up in that town's corruption. Kitty and her new business partner Claire Hollis (Beverly Garland) must then deal with the town's "Papa" Steiffer (Henry Jones).
509	20	"Albert"	Vincent McEveety	Jim Byrnes	February 9, 1970	0368
Bank teller Albert Schiller (Milton Selzer), loyal after 15 years, foils a robbery, but keeps some money for himself, only to wind up helping the robbers with their next attempt while they hold hostage his wife Kate Schiller (Patricia Barry) as leverage.
510	21	"Kiowa"	Bernard McEveety	Ron Bishop	February 16, 1970	0372
Matt helps search for a group of Kiowa raiders, led by Quichero (Richard Angarola), who abducted rancher Ed Vail's (Victor French) daughter, Melissa Vail (Joyce Ames).
511	22	"Celia"	Philip Leacock	Harry Kronman	February 23, 1970	0373
Newly must prove that Celia Madden (Melissa Murphy) is a con artist bent on swindling his friend the blacksmith, Ben Sommars (Cliff Osmond).
512	23	"Morgan"	Bernard McEveety	Kay Lenard & Jess Carneol	March 2, 1970	0375
Outlaws led by Cole Morgan (Steve Forrest) take over Dodge with a Gatling gun to ambush Matt and the U.S. Army who are expected to arrive with a large shipment of gold.
513	24	"The Thieves"	Philip Leacock	Thomas Thompson	March 9, 1970	0371
Sam the bartender (Glenn Strange) takes an interest in trying to reform a juvenile delinquent on probation, Eric Tabray (Michael Burns).
514	25	"Hackett"	Vincent McEveety	William Kelley	March 16, 1970	0376
Ex-convict Hackett (Earl Holliman) seeks revenge on Quentin Sargent (Morgan Woodward) who ran out on him during a robbery years ago.
515	26	"The Cage"	Bernard McEveety	Calvin Clements, Sr.	March 23, 1970	0357
Matt leads a posse to find gold thieves, using Roy Stewart (Steve Carlson) to find the rest of the gang, including their leader Benson (Gregg Palmer), and their gold fencer, Sanders (Paul Stewart).

== Release ==
=== Broadcast ===
Season fifteen aired Mondays at 7:30-8:30 pm (EST) on CBS.

=== Home media ===
The fifteenth season was released on DVD by Paramount Home Entertainment in a two volume set on October 1, 2019.

== Reception ==
Gunsmoke season 15 reached #2 in the Nielsen ratings.

=== Awards and nominations ===
Award	Year (Note: Indicates the year of ceremony.)	Category	Nominee(s) / Work	Result	Ref(s)
Primetime Emmy Awards	1970	Outstanding Achievement in Film Sound Editing	Norman Karlin and Richard E. Raderman	Won (Note: Tied with Alex Bamattre, Michael Colgan, Douglas H. Grindstaff, Joe Kavigan, Bill Lee, and Josef E. Von Stroheim for ABC Movie of the Week: The Immortal)	
