= Gunsmoke season 13 =

Gunsmoke
- Season 13
- Starring: James Arness; Ken Curtis; Milburn Stone; Amanda Blake; Buck Taylor
- No. of episodes: 25

Release
- Original network: CBS
- Original release: September 11, 1967 – March 4, 1968

Season chronology
- ← Previous; Season 12 Next → Season 14

Gunsmoke is an American Western television series developed by Charles Marquis Warren and based on the radio program of the same name. The series ran for 20 seasons, making it the longest-running Western in television history.

The first episode of season 13 aired in the United States on September 11, 1967, and the final episode aired on March 4, 1968. All episodes were broadcast in the U.S. by CBS.

Season 13 of Gunsmoke was the second season of color episodes. Previous seasons were filmed in black-and-white.

== Synopsis ==
Gunsmoke is set in and around Dodge City, Kansas, in the post-Civil War era and centers on United States Marshal Matt Dillon (James Arness) as he enforces law and order in the city. In its original format, the series also focuses on Dillon's friendship with deputy Festus Haggen (Ken Curtis); Doctor Galen "Doc" Adams (Milburn Stone), the town's physician; and Kitty Russell (Amanda Blake), saloon girl and later owner of the Long Branch Saloon. Deputy Newly O'Brien (Buck Taylor) was added to the cast in season 13.

== Cast and characters ==
=== Main ===
- James Arness as Matt Dillon
- Milburn Stone as Doc
- Amanda Blake as Kitty
- Glenn Strange as Sam Noonan
- Ken Curtis as Festus
- Buck Taylor as Newly

== Production ==
Season 13 consisted of 25 one-hour color episodes produced by John Mantley and associate producer Joseph Dackow.

=== Writing ===
This season included a rewrite of season 8, episode 28, "I Call Him Wonder" released as episode 14, "Wonder".

The title for episode 19, "Blood Money", was also used in season 3, episode 3.

== Episodes ==
No. overall	No. in season	Title	Directed by	Written by	Original release date	Prod. code
439	1	"The Wreckers"	Robert Totten	Hal Sitowitz	September 11, 1967	0251
Kitty pins Matt's badge on an unconscious outlaw to protect the marshal from a holdup gang.
440	2	"Cattle Barons"	Gunnar Hellström	Clyde Ware	September 18, 1967	0261
Cattle barons fight over a large herd.
441	3	"The Prodigal"	Bernard McEveety	Calvin Clements, Sr.	September 25, 1967	0229
A journalist looking for a sensational story talks Matt into reopening a murder case, where the Marshal finds himself the prime suspect.
442	4	"Vengeance"	Richard C. Sarafian	Calvin Clements, Sr.	October 2, 1967	0252
443	5	"Vengeance"	Richard C. Sarafian	Calvin Clements, Sr.	October 9, 1967	0252
A drifter seeks revenge against a rancher and his men when they kill his brother and severely injure his father. The drifter refuses Matt's help and chooses to exact revenge his way, with no regards to who he hurts.
444	6	"A Hat"	Robert Totten	Ron Bishop	October 16, 1967	0254
A stray bullet from a cattle baron ruins the hat of a frontiersman, setting off a chain reaction of violence and retribution.
445	7	"Hard Luck Henry"	John Rich	Warren Douglas	October 23, 1967	0262
Festus goes to Pratt County with his clumsy cousin "Hard-Luck" Henry, to determine how a chest of gold should be divided among the Haggen clan.
446	8	"Major Glory"	Robert Totten	Story by : Clyde Ware and Richard Carr; Teleplay by : Richard Carr	October 30, 1967	0257
A pair of Army deserters wait for the perfect opportunity to murder their Sergeant, whose been riding roughshod over them.
447	9	"The Pillagers"	Vincent McEveety	Calvin Clements, Sr.	November 6, 1967	0259
A gang of outlaws kidnap Newly and Kitty based on their assumption that he's a doctor.
448	10	"Prairie Wolfer"	Robert Butler	Calvin Clements, Sr.	November 13, 1967	0255
While Festus is acting Marshal, a desperate pair of trappers steal $20,000 from a fur trader who refused to buy their worthless pelts. Second Gunsmoke episode titled "Prairie Wolfer". The first was season 9, episode 16.
449	11	"Stranger in Town"	E. Darrell Hallenbeck	Story by : Emily Mosher and John Dunkel; Screenplay by : John Dunkel	November 20, 1967	0263
A hired killer is distracted by his wife and a son that he never knew.
450	12	"Death Train"	Gunnar Hellström	Ken Trevey	November 27, 1967	0264
The passengers of a railroad car are quarantined for a fever that could spread.
451	13	"Rope Fever"	David Alexander	Chris Rellas	December 4, 1967	0260
A Sheriff enjoys his new-found glory when he puts Festus in jail on a trumped-up murder charge.
452	14	"Wonder"	Irving J. Moore	Story by : Mary Worrell and William Blinn; Screenplay by : William Blinn	December 18, 1967	0258
Matt helps an Indian boy reunite with a drifter whose being badgered by a pair of disgruntled brothers.
453	15	"Baker's Dozen"	Irving J. Moore	Charles Joseph Stone	December 25, 1967	0265
Doc fights to keep three orphaned babies from being separated.
454	16	"The Victim"	Vincent McEveety	Story by : Hal Sitowitz; Screenplay by : Arthur Rowe	January 1, 1968	0268
Matt comes to the aid of a Sheriff in a nearby town to help fend off a lynch mob.
455	17	"Dead Man's Law"	John Rich	Calvin Clements, Jr.	January 8, 1968	0269
Matt is seriously injured in a shoot-out outside of Dodge, and in his absence a group of vigilantes run rampant in town.
456	18	"Nowhere to Run"	Vincent McEveety	Story by : Robert Totten; Screenplay by : Ron Honthaner	January 15, 1968	0270
A pair of teenage thieves' hamper the rescue of their partner, who fell into a well, for fear that he'll give them up.
457	19	"Blood Money"	Robert Totten	Hal Sitowitz	January 22, 1968	0267
A gunfighter's father despises his son's profession and purposely disables his shooting hand, and now he must defend himself from three avenging gunman.
458	20	"Hill Girl"	Robert Totten	Calvin Clements, Sr.	January 29, 1968	0273
Newly stops a young back-hills girl who's trying to escape an abusive relationship involving her half-brothers from stealing his horse and little do they know, when he takes her to Dodge, the half-crazed brothers follow.
459	21	"The Gunrunners"	Irving J. Moore	Hal Sitowitz	February 5, 1968	0272
A trapper attempts to mete out justice to Army deserters who injured his adopted Indian son.
460	22	"The Jackals"	Alvin Ganzer	Calvin Clements, Jr.	February 12, 1968	0256
Matt heads down into Mexico to capture a man who plotted the murder of his old friend and mentor.
461	23	"The First People"	Robert Totten	Calvin Clements, Sr.	February 19, 1968	0271
A politically ambitious Indian Agent falsely accuses Matt of participating in a murder committed on the reservation.
462	24	"Mr. Sam'l"	Gunnar Hellström	Harry Kronman	February 26, 1968	0274
A water-witcher offers hope to ranchers and farmers when Dodge is struck by a drought.
463	25	"A Noose for Dobie Price"	Richard C. Sarafian	Antony Ellis	March 4, 1968	0266
Matt enlists the help of a former outlaw to find two condemned killers who escaped from jail.

== Release ==
=== Broadcast ===
Gunsmoke began its thirteenth season in a new timeslot (Mondays at 7:30 PM eastern time). With this the series returned to being among the top ten highest rated programs, where it remained for the next six seasons.

=== Home media ===
The thirteenth season was released on DVD by Paramount Home Entertainment in a two volume set on May 22, 2018.

== Reception ==
After failing to make the top 30 the previous season, Gunsmoke season 13 moved to a new timeslot and jumped to #4 in the Nielsen ratings.

=== Awards and nominations ===
Award	Year (Note: Indicates the year of ceremony.)	Category	Nominee(s) / Work	Result	Ref(s)
Primetime Emmy Awards	1968	Outstanding Achievement in Musical Composition	Morton Stevens for "Major Glory"	Nominated	
Primetime Emmy Awards	1968	Outstanding Performance by an Actor in a Supporting Role in a Drama	Milburn Stone	Won	
