= Gunsmoke season 16 =

Gunsmoke
- Season 16
- Starring: James Arness; Ken Curtis; Milburn Stone; Amanda Blake; Buck Taylor
- No. of episodes: 24

Release
- Original network: CBS
- Original release: September 14, 1970 – March 8, 1971

Season chronology
- ← Previous; Season 15 Next → Season 17

Gunsmoke is an American Western television series developed by Charles Marquis Warren and based on the radio program of the same name. The series ran for 20 seasons, making it the longest-running Western in television history.

The first episode of season 16 aired in the United States on September 14, 1970, and the final episode aired on March 8, 1971. All episodes were broadcast in the U.S. by CBS.

Season 16 of Gunsmoke was the fifth season of color episodes. Previous seasons were filmed in black-and-white.

== Synopsis ==
Gunsmoke is set in and around Dodge City, Kansas, in the post-Civil War era and centers on United States Marshal Matt Dillon (James Arness) as he enforces law and order in the city. In its original format, the series also focuses on Dillon's friendship with deputy Festus Haggen (Ken Curtis); Doctor Galen "Doc" Adams (Milburn Stone), the town's physician; Kitty Russell (Amanda Blake), saloon girl and later owner of the Long Branch Saloon; and deputy Newly O'Brien (Buck Taylor).

== Cast and characters ==
=== Main ===
- James Arness as Matt Dillon
- Milburn Stone as Doc
- Amanda Blake as Kitty
- Glenn Strange as Sam Noonan
- Ken Curtis as Festus
- Buck Taylor as Newly

== Production ==
Season 16 consisted of 24 one-hour color episodes produced by executive producer John Mantley along with producers Joseph Dackow (episodes 516–528) and Leonard Katzman (episodes 529–539).

"Pike", the two-part episode that ended the season, was later developed into a spin-off series entitled Dirty Sally.

== Episodes ==
No. overall	No. in season	Title	Directed by	Written by	Original release date	Prod. code
516	1	"Chato"	Vincent McEveety	Paul F. Edwards	September 14, 1970	0409
Matt heads to New Mexico to track down the wily killer Chato (Ricardo Montalbán) who has a knack for murdering lawmen.
517	2	"The Noose"	Vincent McEveety	Arthur Browne, Jr.	September 21, 1970	0401
A stranger, Fred Garth (Tom Skerritt), bent on avenging his father's hanging captures Kitty, Festus, Doc, and Matt, and threatens to hang one of them.
518	3	"Stark"	Robert Totten	Donald Sanford	September 28, 1970	0403
Bounty hunter Lewis Stark (Richard Kiley) blackmails his prisoner, Adam Bramley (Shelly Novack), whose father, John Bramley (Henry Wilcoxon), is a wealthy rancher.
519	4	"Sam McTavish, M.D."	Bernard McEveety	Bethel Leslie & Gerry Day	October 5, 1970	0410
"Dr. Sam" (portrayed by Special Guest Vera Miles) answers Dr. Galen Adam's ad for a temporary replacement so that Doc can leave Dodge to attend a special honorary event for his benefactor from medical school. However, Doc is surprised and outraged when Dr. Samuel McTavish (so-named because her father wanted a boy) turns out to be a woman.
520	5	"Gentry's Law"	Vincent McEveety	Jack Miller	October 12, 1970	0404
Land baron Amos Gentry (John Payne) considers his family above the law when his two sons Colt (Peter Jason) and Ben (Robert Pine) accidentally hang a squatter, Orly Grimes (Shug Fisher) who was caught butchering their stock.
521	6	"Snow Train"	Gunnar Hellström	Preston Wood	October 19, 1970	0406
522	7	"Snow Train"	Gunnar Hellström	Preston Wood	October 26, 1970	0407
Part 1: High in the snow-capped mountains, the Sioux take a trainload of passengers hostage, demanding two white men who sold them poisonous whisky. Matt must find the culprits before the passengers freeze to death. Part 2: In the high mountains, the Sioux take a trainload of passengers hostage, demanding two white men who sold them poisonous whisky. Matt must find the culprits before the passengers freeze to death.
523	8	"Luke"	Bernard McEveety	Jack Miller	November 2, 1970	0412
Outlaw Luke Dangerfield's (Morgan Woodward) dying wish is to see his daughter.
524	9	"The Gun"	Bernard McEveety	Donald Sanford	November 9, 1970	0407
St. Louis newspaperman Summer Pendleton (L. Q. Jones) exploits teenage bank clerk Randy Gogan (Kevin Coughlin) who killed a notorious gunfighter.
525	10	"The Scavengers"	Robert Totten	Jim Byrnes	November 16, 1970	0411
A bounty is placed on Indians for allegedly massacring a group of pioneers, based on the story of a man, Piney Briggs (Yaphet Kotto), who stumbled upon their camp site.
526	11	"The Witness"	Philip Leacock	Shimon Wincelberg	November 23, 1970	0405
Osgood Picket (Harry Morgan) kills one witness and threatens the family of another witness, Arnie Sprague (Tim O'Connor), to get his murderous son Ira Picket (Dack Rambo) released from custody.
527	12	"McCabe"	Bernard McEveety	Jim Byrnes	November 30, 1970	0402
Matt's prisoner, gunfighter McCabe (Dan Kemp), is targeted by a lynch mob led by cattleman Clay White (David Brian) and his own teenage son Dobie (Mitch Vogel).
528	13	"The Noon Day Devil"	Philip Leacock	William Kelley	December 7, 1970	0413
A priest, Father Hernando Cantrell, tries to save his murderous twin brother Heraclio's soul. Both roles were portrayed by special guest, Anthony Zerbe.
529	14	"Sergeant Holly"	Bernard McEveety	William Kelley	December 14, 1970	0414
Sgt. Holly (Forrest Tucker) sets out to find Willis Jeeter (Albert Salmi) who framed him for stealing an Army payroll.
530	15	"Jenny"	Robert Totten	Jack Miller	December 28, 1970	0415
Jenny (Lisa Gerritsen) arrives at Dodge to be with her father whom she has not yet met, not realizing he is the outlaw, Lucas Pritchard (Steve Ihnat), worth a bounty of $2,000 for robbery and assault.
531	16	"Captain Sligo"	William Conrad	William Kelley	January 4, 1971	0416
Retired whaler, Captain Aron Sligo (Richard Basehart) moves to Kansas and begins courting the widow Josephine Burney (Salome Jens), all the while dealing with some unscrupulous cattlemen.
532	17	"Mirage"	Vincent McEveety	Jack Miller	January 11, 1971	0417
Festus comes back from a desert shootout with no memory of what exactly took place. Fearing that his son Adam (Kevin Burchett) was the one who was killed, Lemuel (John Anderson) and his remaining children, Tom (Gary Wood) and Elsie (Mary Rings) take Festus hostage until they can find Adam's remains.
533	18	"The Tycoon"	Bernard McEveety	Robert Vincent Wright	January 25, 1971	0418
After coming into money, Festus falls prey, first to his unscrupulous partner Titus (Shug Fisher), and then to Ma Fowler (Nora Marlowe) who is husband-hunting for her daughter Dora Lou (Gwynne Gilford).
534	19	"Jaekel"	Bernard McEveety	Story by : True Boardman & Thelma Boardman; Screenplay by : Calvin Clements, Sr.	February 1, 1971	0420
Pardoned convict Carl Jaekel (Eric Braeden) returns after eight years in prison to the woman, Beth Wilson (Julie Gregg), for whom he killed a romantic rival, despite that she is now married to another man, Norman Wilson (John Crawford), and has a daughter, Penny Wilson (Mia Bendixsen).
535	20	"Murdoch"	Robert Totten	Jack Miller	February 8, 1971	0419
Aging lawman Lucas Murdoch (Jack Elam) sets out to get an outlaw gang led by Amos Carver (Jim Davis), unaware that his son Scott (Bob Random) is with them.
536	21	"Cleavus"	Vincent McEveety	Richard Scott	February 15, 1971	0424
An unlucky fellow, Cleavus Lukens (Robert Totten), accidentally kills prospector Uriah Spessard (Arthur Hunnicutt), and then jumps his claim so that he will have enough money and prestige to court Kitty.
537	22	"Lavery"	Vincent McEveety	Donald Sanford	February 22, 1971	0421
Troublemaker Keith Lavery (Anthony Costello), out on probation, reunites with his old gang, Clint (David Carradine) and Harry (Ken Swofford), but is torn between going with them or staying with his wife, April Lavery (Judi West).
538	23	"Pike"	Bernard McEveety	Jack Miller	March 1, 1971	0422
539	24	"Pike"	Bernard McEveety	Jack Miller	March 8, 1971	0423
Part 1: Crusty old Sally Fergus (Jeanette Nolan) tries to nurse a wounded young outlaw named Cyrus Pike (Dack Rambo) back to health. Part 2: Having taken a shine to Cyrus while tending to his wounds, Sally tries to persuade him not to steal anymore.

== Release ==
=== Broadcast ===
Season sixteen aired Mondays at 7:30-8:30 pm (EST) on CBS.

=== Home media ===
The sixteenth season was released on DVD by Paramount Home Entertainment on December 10, 2019.

== Reception ==
Gunsmoke season 16 reached #5 in the Nielsen ratings.
