= Maybe I'll Come Home in the Spring =

1971 American TV movie

- Written by: Bruce Feldman
- Directed by: Joseph Sargent
- Starring: Sally Field; Eleanor Parker; Jackie Cooper; Lane Bradbury; David Carradine
- Music by: Earl Robinson
- Country of origin: United States
- Original language: English

Production
- Executive producer: Charles Fries
- Producer: Joseph Sargent
- Cinematography: Russell Metty
- Editor: Pembroke J. Herring
- Running time: 74 minutes
- Production company: Metromedia Producers Corporation

Original release
- Network: ABC
- Release: February 16, 1971

Maybe I'll Come Home in the Spring is a 1971 American made-for-television drama film directed by Joseph Sargent and starring Sally Field, Eleanor Parker, Jackie Cooper, Lane Bradbury and David Carradine. The film premiered as the ABC Movie of the Week on February 16, 1971.

== Plot ==
Denise "Dennie" Miller is a teenage runaway who returns to her parents Ed and Claire's suburban home after a year of living on the streets as a hippie. Her younger sister, Susie, is following in her footsteps, wanting the idealistic hippie life but making some rash decisions in the process. Dennie's life – before she left, and during her time as a runaway, with her hippie boyfriend, Flack – is shown in flashbacks. While the challenges of her return to a "normal" life unfold, Dennie has difficulty determining if she has made the right choice coming back. When Flack shows up to try to win her back, Dennie sends him away, choosing to stay in suburbia. As Flack leaves Los Angeles, Susie is seen on the street hitchhiking, having chosen to run away.

== Cast ==
- Sally Field as Denise "Dennie" Miller
- Eleanor Parker as Claire Miller
- Lane Bradbury as Susie Miller
- David Carradine as Flack
- Jackie Cooper as Ed Miller

== Production ==
Linda Ronstadt performs the title song, and a second song, written for the film.
