= The Red Pony (1973 film) =

1973 television film directed by Robert Totten

- 1973 promotional premiere advertisement
- Genre: Drama; Western
- Based on: The Red Pony by John Steinbeck
- Screenplay by: Ron Bishop; Robert Totten
- Directed by: Robert Totten
- Starring: Henry Fonda; Maureen O'Hara; Ben Johnson; Jack Elam
- Theme music composer: Jerry Goldsmith
- Country of origin: United States
- Original language: English

Production
- Executive producer: Ray Kellogg
- Producers: Frederick H. Brogger; James Franciscus
- Cinematography: Frank Ahern; Andrew Jackson; Frank V. Phillips
- Editor: Marsh Hendry
- Running time: 101 minutes
- Production companies: Omnibus Productions; Universal Television

Original release
- Network: NBC
- Release: March 18, 1973

The Red Pony is a 1973 American made-for-television drama western film directed and co-written by Robert Totten, based on the 1937 novel The Red Pony by John Steinbeck. The film features Henry Fonda, Maureen O'Hara, Ben Johnson and Jack Elam.

== Premise ==
A young boy, played by Clint Howard, becomes very attached to a newborn colt.

== Cast ==
- Henry Fonda as Carl Tiflin
- Maureen O'Hara as Ruth Tiflin
- Ben Johnson as Jess Taylor
- Jack Elam as Granddad
- Clint Howard as Jody Tiflin
- Julian Rivero as Gitano
- Roy Jenson as Toby
- Lieux Dressler as Dearie
- Richard Jaeckel as James Creighton (scenes deleted)
- Woody Chambliss as Orville Frye
- Link Wyler as Sonny Frye
- Warren Douglas as Barton
- Rance Howard as Sheriff Bill Smith

== Awards ==
Wins

- Emmy Award: Outstanding Achievement in Film Sound Editing - David Marshall (sound editor), Fred J. Brown (sound editor), Ross Taylor (sound editor) - National Broadcasting Company; 1973.
- Emmy Award: Outstanding Achievement in Music Composition - Jerry Goldsmith - NBC; 1973.

== See also ==
- List of American films of 1973
- List of films about horses
