= Bracken's World =

American television series 1969-1970

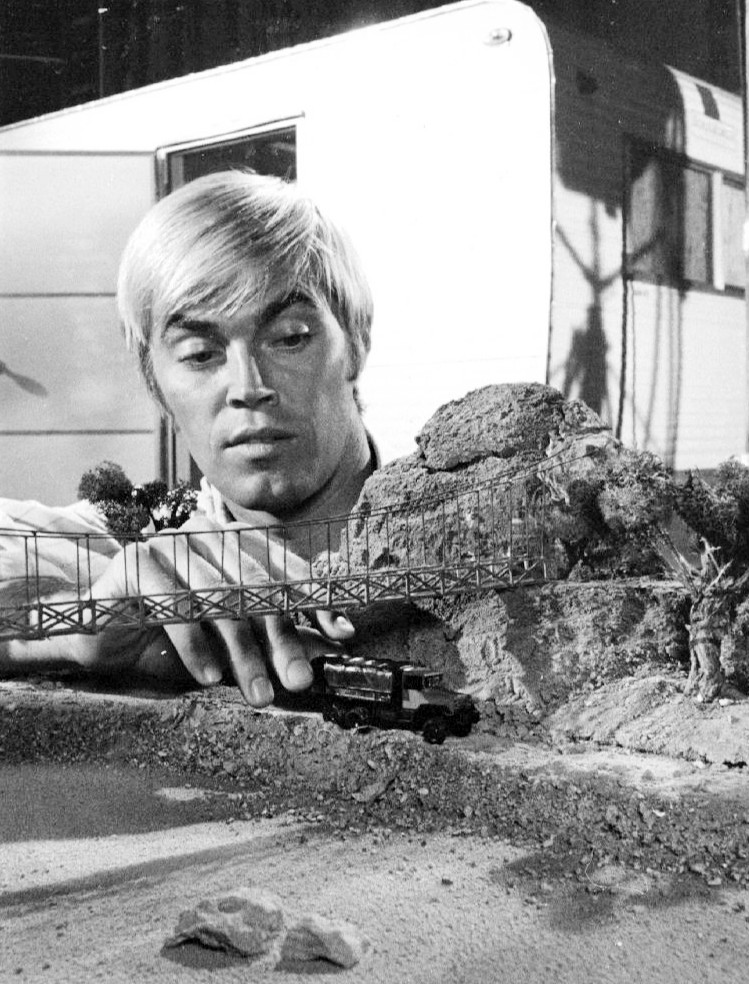
- Dennis Cole as Davey Evans plans a stunt by playing with a model
- Genre: Drama
- Created by: Dorothy Kingsley
- Written by: Bess Boyle; Gerry Day; Jerry de Bono; Cliff Gould; Oliver Hailey; Stephen Kandel; Dorothy Kingsley; Bethel Leslie; Robert Lewin; Charles McDaniel; Robert Presnell, Jr.; Sonya Roberts; Jerry Ziegman
- Directed by: Herschel Daugherty; Robert Day; Charles S. Dubin; Paul Henreid; Lee Philips; Allen Reisner; Nicholas Webster
- Starring: Eleanor Parker; Warren Stevens; Leslie Nielsen
- Theme music composer: David Rose
- Composer: Various
- Country of origin: United States
- Original language: English
- No. of seasons: 2
- No. of episodes: 41

Production
- Executive producer: Del Reisman
- Producers: Dorothy Kingsley; Robert Lewin; Stanley Rubin
- Cinematography: William Cronjager
- Editor: Bill Mosher
- Running time: 45–48 minutes
- Production company: 20th Century-Fox Television

Original release
- Network: NBC
- Release: September 19, 1969 – December 25, 1970

Bracken's World is an American drama television series that aired on NBC from September 19, 1969, to December 25, 1970. The series was created and produced by Dorothy Kingsley. In addition, Kingsley also wrote several episodes. The Lettermen performed the second-season theme song "Worlds".

== Synopsis ==
The series centres on a powerful head of Century Studios and a group of up-and-coming starlets.

During the first season, Eleanor Parker received top billing as Sylvia Caldwell, executive secretary to John Bracken (voice-acted in the first season by Warren Stevens), who was sometimes heard, but never seen. Parker left the series after the first 16 episodes, citing the limited nature of her role. When the second season began, Leslie Nielsen joined the cast to portray Bracken.

Other cast members included Elizabeth Allen, Dennis Cole, Jeanne Cooper, Peter Haskell, Linda Harrison, Karen Jensen, Madlyn Rhue, and Laraine Stephens. Guest stars who appeared in various episodes of Bracken's World included Jack Albertson, Anne Baxter, Joseph Campanella, Gary Collins, Shelley Fabares, Sally Field, Lee Grant, Arthur Hill. Carolyn Jones, Lee Majors, Monte Markham, Tim Matheson, Darren McGavin, Ricardo Montalbán, Lois Nettleton, Lane Bradbury, Stuart Whitman, Larry Pennell, Edward G. Robinson, Martin Sheen, Barry Sullivan, Richard Thomas, Forrest Tucker, and Tony Curtis and Raquel Welch, who appeared as themselves in the pilot episode.

Bracken's World aired on Friday at 10:00 pm (replacing the cancelled Star Trek), a day and time known as the "Friday night death slot", and was cancelled 15 episodes into its second season. "Had they done it like a continuing drama and focused on the regular characters", co-star Linda Harrison said in a 2001 interview, "it would have lasted longer. NBC, however, wanted a one-hour contained show, so they would stock each episode with a big guest star. After a while, you run out of story." The last episode of Bracken's World aired on Friday, December 25, 1970.

== Cast of characters ==
- Warren Stevens as John Bracken (season one; voice only)
- Leslie Nielsen as John Bracken (season two)
- Eleanor Parker as Sylvia Caldwell (episodes 1-16)
- Bettye Ackerman as Anne Frazer (episodes 17-41)
- Elizabeth Allen as Laura Deane
- Dennis Cole as Davey Evans (season one)
- Jeanne Cooper as Grace Douglas
- Gary Dubin as Mark Grant
- Linda Harrison as Paulette Douglas
- Peter Haskell as Kevin Grant
- Karen Jensen as Rachel Holt
- Stephen Oliver as Tom Hudson (season one)
- Madlyn Rhue as Marjorie Grant (episodes 1-28)
- Laraine Stephens as Diane Waring

Tom Selleck was seen in the minor recurring role of Roger Haines in several season-one episodes; he made a guest appearance as a different character in season two.

== Episodes ==
=== Season 1 (1969–70) ===
No. overall	No. in season	Title	Directed by	Written by	Original release date
1	1	"Fade-In"	Walter Doniger	Dorothy Kingsley	September 19, 1969
Sylvia and Laura show devotion to the studio in different ways, while Kevin's shaky marriage suffers even more with attraction to Diane. Meanwhile, Grace's opposition to Paulette's relationship with Davey Evans gets dicier.
2	2	"Panic"	Ted Post	Oliver Hailey	September 26, 1969
While horseback riding, Rachel accidentally runs down a boy scout (Scott Bray), but allows police to place the blame on another actress.
3	3	"King David"	Robert Day	Sonya Roberts	October 3, 1969
A testimonial dinner for Sylvia's father (Jay C. Flippen), a former movie executive, is marred when a fading actress (Carolyn Jones) publicly blames him for the failures of her life.
4	4	"Don't You Cry for Susannah"	Paul Henreid	Robert Presnell, Jr.	October 10, 1969
Mysterious illnesses overtake Diane on set when she befriends a girl assigned to be her understudy.
5	5	"Options"	Nicholas Webster	Robert Lewin	October 17, 1969
Paulette fights desperately to save her career when her option is dropped by Century Pictures.
6	6	"Closed Set"	Herschel Daugherty	Bess Boyle	October 24, 1969
A director, disliked by most of his associates, is mysteriously murdered during the filming of the final scene of his greatest picture.
7	7	"The Sweet Smell of Failure"	Charles S. Dubin	Charles McDaniel	October 31, 1969
Sylvia visits a drug rehabilitation center to persuade an ex-movie director to attempt a comeback.
8	8	"The Stunt"	Herschel Daugherty	Dorothy Kingsley	November 7, 1969
Actor Brock Jordan (Gary Collins) loses stature in his son's eyes when the boy discovers that his father leaves the more dangerous aspects of his TV series to stuntman Davey Evans.
9	9	"All the Beautiful Young Girls"	Paul Henreid	Leonard Kantor	November 14, 1969
Laura suffers heartache when her old love (Arthur Hill) re-enters her life and still displays a weakness for young girls.
10	10	"Package Deal"	John Erman	Stephen Kandel	November 28, 1969
In order to get the big-name actor he wants for his new film, Kevin is forced to hire the man's inexperienced daughter (Shelley Fabares) for the female lead.
11	11	"It's the Power Structure, Baby"	Lee Philips	Cliff Gould	December 5, 1969
When Rachel and a new trainee at Century Studios begin dating, both learn that there are members of their respective races who resent their relationship.
12	12	"Move in for a Close-Up"	Allen Reisner	Oliver Hailey	December 12, 1969
Kevin's wife attempts to save her marriage by getting a job as an assistant script supervisor at Century Studios.
13	13	"Stop Date"	Robert Day	Norman Hudis	December 19, 1969
Personal and professional problems plague producer Kevin Grant as he tries to avoid losing thousands of dollars.
14	14	"The Chase Sequence"	James Neilson	Charles McDaniel	December 26, 1969
Tragedy results when Davey permits another stuntman, suffering from a hangover, to perform a dangerous feat.
15	15	"Focus on a Gun"	Gerald Mayer	Story by : Kenneth Hartman; Teleplay by : Robert Lewin	January 2, 1970
Diane Waring falls in love with a gangster (Joe Don Baker), bringing trouble and tragedy to Century Pictures.
16	16	"The Money Men"	Charles S. Dubin	Sonya Roberts	January 9, 1970
In the midst of a power play aimed at unseating Bracken as the head of Century Pictures, Sylvia quits.
17	17	"Meanwhile, Back at the Studio"	Gary Nelson	Joseph Bonaduce	January 16, 1970
Kevin is pressured to change Apache history in a movie when Paulette Douglas is kidnapped by Indians.
18	18	"A Perfect Piece of Casting"	Paul Henreid	Bess Boyle	January 30, 1970
When Kevin casts an unknown actor (Monte Markham) in a based-on-fact film about a strangler, real criminals turn up in the area.
19	19	"Superstar"	Herschel Daugherty	Charles McDaniel	February 6, 1970
Kevin walks out on production of a movie in which he was forced to star a famous football player (Lee Majors) who can't act.
20	20	"Whatever Happened to Happy Endings?"	Herschel Daugherty	Gerry Day & Bethel Leslie	February 13, 1970
When a malicious columnist's (Lee Grant) offer to help a young actress is refused, she creates a scandal involving Kevin that brings tragedy to Century Pictures.
21	21	"Fallen, Fallen Is Babylon"	Allen Reisner	Jerry Ziegman	February 20, 1970
Rachel is kidnapped by an unbalanced, Bible-quoting young man (Richard Thomas) who believes that he has been chosen to save her from pending judgement.
22	22	"Papa Never Spanked Me"	Charles S. Dubin	Adrian Spies	February 27, 1970
The troubles of a father and son acting team (Jack Albertson and Martin Sheen) help slow down production of Kevin's new movie.
23	23	"A Beginning, a Middle, and an End"	Lee Philips	Leonard Kantor	March 6, 1970
Kevin cannot get an author (Joseph Campanella) to change the ending of a script, even though the movie is nearly completed.
24	24	"Diffusion"	Charles S. Dubin	Stephen Kandel	March 13, 1970
A film star (Anne Baxter) ruins a movie by forcing the director to use the techniques of a bygone era.
25	25	"Day for Night"	Nicholas Webster	Robert Lewin	March 20, 1970
Rachel's unreasonable demands result in her getting fired from Kevin Grant's picture.
26	26	"One, Two, Three... Cry"	Paul Henreid	Jerry Ziegman	March 27, 1970
A jealous drama coach (Barry Sullivan) manipulates Paulette into quitting the talent school.

=== Season 2 (1970) ===
No. overall	No. in season	Title	Directed by	Written by	Original release date	Prod. code
27	1	"Love It or Leave It, Change It or Lose It"	Herschel Daugherty	Clyde Ware	September 18, 1970	E-203
Two actors (Forrest Tucker and Tony Bill) who bitterly oppose each other politically, disrupt a movie they are making together.
28	2	"Murder Off Camera"	Lee Phillips	Oliver Hailey	September 25, 1970	E-204
Kevin returns home to a shocking scene: his wife is dead and his son is missing. Stars Stuart Whitman, Lane Bradbury and Lou Antonio.
29	3	"Jenny, Who Bombs Buildings"	Lee Phillips	George Kirgo	October 2, 1970	E-202
An anti-establishment activist (Sally Field) accepts Bracken's offer to star in a documentary about herself.
30	4	"Together Again for the Last Time"	Paul Henreid	Story by : James Poe; Teleplay by : Bess Boyle	October 9, 1970	E-206
John Bracken attempts to force an actor's widow to complete the movie that she and her husband had begun.
31	5	"A Preview in Samarkand"	Herschel Daugherty	Robert Presnell	October 16, 1970	E-205
Kevin becomes enamored of a film editing student, but finds he has competition in the person of his boss, John Bracken.
32	6	"The Mary Tree"	Paul Henreid	Jerry Ziegman	October 23, 1970	E-207
During the filming of a celebrated writer's (Edward G. Robinson) story, Kevin becomes suspicious of the man's "perfect" image.
33	7	"Hey Gringo, Hey Poncho"	Robert Day	Ken Kolb	October 30, 1970	E-208
A Chicano leader (Ricardo Montalbán) loses the lead in Bracken's movie when his group makes demands on the studio.
34	8	"A Team of One Legged Acrobats"	Lee Phillips	Tom and Helen August	November 6, 1970	E-209
Rachel breaks up both a marriage and a director-writer team (Tom Skerritt and Kim Hunter) when Bracken reluctantly gives her a bit part in their film.
35	9	"The Anonymous Star"	Paul Henreid	Gerry Day & Bethel Leslie	November 13, 1970	E-201
A nervous actress is given a drink by Kevin, who is unaware that she is a recovering alcoholic.
36	10	"Infinity"	Robert Day	Cliff Gould	November 20, 1970	E-210
Diane Waring falls in love with a famous cameraman (Darren McGavin), unaware that he is slowly losing his sight.
37	11	"The Nude Scene"	Charles S. Dubin	Nicholas E. Baehr	November 27, 1970	E-211
An actress (Lois Nettleton) has second thoughts about a nude scene in a film that is almost completed.
38	12	"A Score Without Strings"	Paul Henreid	Jack Sher	December 4, 1970	E-212
Century Studios loses a music composer when the young man breaks off his romance with Paulette.
39	13	"Will Freddy's Real Father Please Stand Up?"	Charles S. Dubin	Adrian Spies	December 11, 1970	E-213
A young actor neglects his television commitments at Century Studios in order to run away to join his dissolute father (Rupert Crosse).
40	14	"The Country Boy"	Gary Nelson	Leonard Kantor	December 18, 1970	E-214
Bracken fires Laura when her personal feelings for a country singer (Tim Matheson) interfere with her job.
41	15	"Miss Isabel Blue"	Charles S. Dubin	Jerry de Bono	December 25, 1970	E-215
An English actress (Sally Ann Howes) causes a series of problems when she is hired to portray famous suffragist Susan B. Anthony.

== In popular culture ==
The show was mentioned in Mad Men: "Time Zones", when Megan Draper's agent told her she had received a call back for the Bracken's World pilot.

== Awards and nominations ==
Year	Award	Category	Nominee(s)	Result	Ref.
1970	Emmy Awards	Outstanding Achievement in Film Editing for Entertainment Programming - For a Series or a Single Program of a Series	Bill Mosher (For episode "Sweet Smell of Failure")	Won	
1970	Golden Globe Award	Best TV Show - Drama	Bracken's World	Nominated	
1970	Golden Globe Award	Best TV Actress - Drama	Eleanor Parker	Nominated	
