= Cutter's Trail =

1970 TV film

- Directed by: Vincent McEveety
- Starring: John Gavin; Marisa Pavan; Joseph Cotten; Victor French; Mills Watson; Shug Fisher; Robert Totten
- Country of origin: United States
- Original language: English

Original release
- Release: February 10, 1970

Cutter's Trail is a 1970 American Western television film. It was the pilot for a series that was never picked up.

== Plot ==
A marshal returns to his home town to find it has been taken over by outlaws.

== Production ==
Parts of the film were shot at the Kanab movie fort in Utah.
