= Pony Express Rider =

1976 film by Robert Totten

- Directed by: Robert Totten
- Written by: Dan Greer; Hal Harrison; Robert Totten
- Produced by: Lyman Dayton; Robert Fridley; Dan Greer; Hal Harrison
- Starring: Henry Wilcoxon; Maureen McCormick; Joan Caulfield
- Cinematography: Bernie Abramson
- Edited by: Marsh Hendry
- Music by: Robert O. Ragland
- Production company: Doty-Dayton Production
- Release date: November 18, 1976
- Running time: 100 minutes
- Country: United States
- Language: English

Pony Express Rider is a 1976 American Western film directed by Robert Totten and starring Henry Wilcoxon, Maureen McCormick and Joan Caulfield. In 1860 young Jimmie Richardson joins the Pony Express to help find the man he believes killed his father.

== Plot ==
The year is 1860. The United States is inexorably heading towards civil war. Gold fever excites prospectors with wild dreams. Pioneers are pushing the western frontier further. Against these events, is the story of two rugged frontiersmen. They are friends - Trevor Kingman is a rancher who lusts for power and Jed Richardson is a modest man who hopes to carve decency into the western wilds.

Kingman's pursuit of political fame and fortune eventually splits the friends. The only link between them is the love that developed between Richardson's son, Jimmy D., and Kingman's daughter, Rose of Sharon.

When a feud develops between the two families, Bovey (Kingman's son) - in a moment of anger - murders Jed. Jimmy D., despite his love for Rose, decides to avenge his father's death. He sets out after Bovey, racing through the wilderness plains across Native American-held country. By a chanceful opportunity Jimmy D. joins the Pony Express mail rider service. It is through the Pony Express that he is able to ride across hostile territory in his vengeance mission. Eventually, in uncharted territory, Jimmy D. gets his revenge.

== Cast ==
- Stewart Petersen as Jimmie D. Richardson
- Henry Wilcoxon as Trevor Kingman
- Buck Taylor as Bovey Kingman
- Maureen McCormick as Rose of Sharon
- Ken Curtis as Jed Richardson
- Joan Caulfield as Charlotte
- Slim Pickens as Bob Jay
- Dub Taylor as Boomer Riley
- Ace Reid as Bullfrog Fry
- Jack Elam as Crazy Charlie
- Larry D. Mann as Blackmore
- James Almanzar as Puddin
- Bea Morris as Marquette Richardson
- Tom Waters as Button Forehand
- Cliff Brand as Capt. Billings
- Bleu McKenzie as Yankee Bill
- George Roland II as Mr. Price
- Scott Petersen as David Richardson
- Harold Lee Thompson as Buddy Rhodes
- Delmer Buddy Totten as Bobby Charles Richardson
- Donna Jamison as Glee Ann
- Dennis Lehane as Cpl. Ross
- Bill Conklin as Smiles

== Bibliography ==
- Monaco, James. The Encyclopedia of Film. Perigee Books, 1991.
