= Gunsmoke season 12 =

Gunsmoke
- Season 12
- Starring: James Arness; Ken Curtis; Milburn Stone; Amanda Blake; Roger Ewing
- No. of episodes: 29

Release
- Original network: CBS
- Original release: September 17, 1966 – April 15, 1967

Season chronology
- ← Previous; Season 11 Next → Season 13

Gunsmoke is an American Western television series developed by Charles Marquis Warren and based on the radio program of the same name. The series ran for 20 seasons, making it the longest-running Western in television history.

The first episode of season 12 aired in the United States on September 17, 1966, and the final episode aired on April 15, 1967. All episodes were broadcast in the U.S. by CBS.

Season 12 of Gunsmoke was the first season of color episodes. Previous seasons were filmed in black-and-white.

== Synopsis ==
Gunsmoke is set in and around Dodge City, Kansas, in the post-Civil War era and centers on United States Marshal Matt Dillon (James Arness) as he enforces law and order in the city. In its original format, the series also focuses on Dillon's friendship with deputy Festus Haggen (Ken Curtis); Doctor Galen "Doc" Adams (Milburn Stone), the town's physician; and Kitty Russell (Amanda Blake), saloon girl and later owner of the Long Branch Saloon. Deputy Clayton Thaddeus Greenwood (Roger Ewing) was added to the cast in season 11.

== Cast and characters ==
=== Main ===
- James Arness as Matt Dillon
- Milburn Stone as Doc
- Amanda Blake as Kitty
- Glenn Strange as Sam Noonan
- Ken Curtis as Festus
- Roger Ewing as Thad

== Production ==
Season 12 consisted of 29 one-hour color episodes produced by Philip Leacock and associate producer John Mantley.

== Episodes ==
No. overall	No. in season	Title	Directed by	Written by	Original release date	Prod. code
410	1	"Snap Decision"	Mark Rydell	Richard Carr	September 17, 1966	0203
Matt turns in his badge after being forced to kill a horse thief who was once his friend.
411	2	"The Goldtakers"	Vincent McEveety	Clyde Ware	September 24, 1966	0204
An outlaw brings his cohorts to Dodge to melt down the shipment of gold they have stolen.
412	3	"The Jailer"	Vincent McEveety	Hal Sitowitz	October 1, 1966	0206
The powerful matriarch of the Stone family plots her revenge on Matt for having her husband hanged six years ago.
413	4	"The Mission"	Mark Rydell	Richard Carr	October 8, 1966	0205
While in Mexico, Matt has his badge, horse and prisoner stolen by Americans.
414	5	"The Good People"	Robert Totten	James Landis	October 15, 1966	0210
Matt uses a bounty hunter's guilty conscience to find the men responsible for lynching a suspected rustler.
415	6	"Gunfighter, R.I.P."	Mark Rydell	Story by : Michael Fisher; Screenplay by : Hal Sitowitz	October 22, 1966	0215
An injured gunslinger is hired to kill Matt but reconsiders when a Chinese woman tends to his wounds.
416	7	"The Wrong Man"	Robert Totten	Story by : Robert Lewin; Screenplay by : Clyde Ware	October 29, 1966	0208
A farmer is charged with murder after the card shark who won his money dies from the blow he delivered.
417	8	"The Whispering Tree"	Vincent McEveety	Calvin Clements, Sr.	November 12, 1966	0201
An ex-convict returns home to try to find the money he buried eight years ago but he's being hounded by his former partner and a Sheriff with knowledge of the crime.
418	9	"The Well"	Marc Daniels	Francis Cockrell	November 19, 1966	0209
When Dodge is struck by a drought, Festus looks for water and Matt uses a rainmaker to give the townspeople hope.
419	10	"Stage Stop"	Irving J. Moore	Hal Sitowitz	November 26, 1966	0212
Doc takes a stand against bandits and an abusive husband at a stage stop.
420	11	"The Newcomers"	Robert Totten	Calvin Clements, Sr.	December 3, 1966	0218
An immigrant must decide whether to pay off a blackmailer who claims to have seen the immigrant's son commit murder.
421	12	"Quaker Girl"	Bernard L. Kowalski	Preston Wood	December 10, 1966	0202
After being deputized, Thad takes a murderer across the plains and deals with outlaws giving chase.
422	13	"The Moonstone"	Richard A. Colla	Paul Savage	December 17, 1966	0216
An ex-criminal fears that a conflict involving his girlfriend, brother and old partner will reveal his past.
423	14	"Champion of the World"	Marc Daniels	Les Crutchfield	December 24, 1966	0214
An ex-prize fighter and a con artist conspire to persuade Kitty into selling the Long Branch.
424	15	"The Hanging"	Bernard L. Kowalski	Story by : Calvin Clements, Jr. Teleplay by : Calvin Clements, Sr.	December 31, 1966	0207
Matt must determine how and when the partners of a murderer he has in custody will make their move.
425	16	"Saturday Night"	Robert Totten	Clyde Ware	January 7, 1967	0220
A cattle drive drover plans to free Matt's prisoner.
426	17	"Mad Dog"	Charles R. Rondeau	Jay Simms	January 14, 1967	0217
Festus is mistaken for a hired gunman in the town of Bucklin.
427	18	"Muley"	Allen Reisner	Les Crutchfield	January 21, 1967	0213
A young outlaw has wounded Matt, but he's unable to finish him off because of his affections for a saloon girl.
428	19	"Mail Drop"	Robert Totten	Calvin Clements, Sr.	January 28, 1967	0222
A young boy comes looking for his father unaware that he's a wanted outlaw.
429	20	"Old Friend"	Allen Reisner	Clyde Ware	February 4, 1967	0211
A Marshal from Arizona pursues the gang of outlaws who burned his town and ran off with his woman.
430	21	"Fandango"	James Landis	Don Ingalls	February 11, 1967	0219
A sheep rancher is stalking Matt and his prisoner, who killed a few of his ranch hands.
431	22	"The Returning"	Marc Daniels	James Landis	February 18, 1967	0221
An outlaw husband and his gang rob Dodge's freight office and leaves the money with his wife, which creates even greater problems.
432	23	"The Lure"	Marc Daniels	Clyde Ware	February 25, 1967	0224
Kitty is abducted by an outlaw who tries to turn his daughter against him to escape.
433	24	"Noose of Gold"	Irving J. Moore	Clyde Ware	March 4, 1967	0226
A state official uses Matt's friendship with an outlaw for personal gain.
434	25	"The Favor"	Marc Daniels	Don Ingalls	March 11, 1967	0223
Kitty is torn between Matt and the man who once saved her life, a parolee whose making threats towards the Marshall.
435	26	"Mistaken Identity"	Robert Totten	Paul Savage and Les Crutchfield	March 18, 1967	0227
A fugitive learns that the unconscious man whose identity he's using is being brought in by Matt.
436	27	"Ladies from St. Louis"	Irving J. Moore	Clyde Ware	March 25, 1967	0228
A group of nuns bring their injured protector to Dodge, without mentioning he is a former criminal.
437	28	"Nitro!"	Robert Totten	Preston Wood	April 8, 1967	0225
438	29	"Nitro!"	Robert Totten	Preston Wood	April 15, 1967	0230
A gang hires a drifter to mix nitroglycerin for them. The drifter hired by the gang mixes one last batch of nitroglycerin.

== Release ==
=== Broadcast ===
Season twelve aired Saturdays at 10:00-11:00 pm (EST) on CBS.

CBS cancelled the series due to low ratings. However, letters of protest and pressure from his wife persuaded William S. Paley, the network's chief executive, to reinstate Gunsmoke for a thirteenth season, whereupon its ratings rebounded and it again became one of the top ten highest rated programs for the next six seasons.

=== Home media ===
The twelfth season was released on DVD by Paramount Home Entertainment in a two volume set on September 20, 2016.

== Response ==
Gunsmoke season 12 failed to make the top 30 in the Nielsen ratings.

In 1997, TV Guide ranked episode 3, "The Jailer", as number 28 on its "100 Greatest Episodes of All Time" list.
