= Lane Bradbury =

American actress and writer

- Born: Janette Lane Bradbury; June 17, 1938 (age 88); Buckhead, Morgan County, Georgia, U.S.
- Occupations: Actress; Writer
- Years active: 1958–present
- Spouse: Lou Antonio (m. 1965; div. 1980)
- Children: 2

Janette Lane Bradbury (born June 17, 1938) is an American actress and writer.

== Biography ==
Lane Bradbury was born in Buckhead, Georgia. She studied ballet as a young girl. In the 1950s, she moved to New York City and was admitted to the Actors Studio.

== Career ==
Stage

Bradbury made her Broadway debut in the role of Jolly Adams in J.B. (1958–59), performing with Raymond Massey and Christopher Plummer. Bradbury was the first actress to play Dainty June in the original Broadway production of Gypsy (1959–61). She starred in Tennessee Williams' play Night of the Iguana (1961–62) with veteran actress Bette Davis. From 1963 to 1964, Bradbury portrayed The Mick in June Havoc's Broadway play Marathon '33.

Screen

In the 1960s, Bradbury moved with her husband Lou Antonio to Los Angeles, where she began a long career in television. She was in 1963's season three opener of The Fugitive titled "Wings of an Angel", playing Janet Kegler, a woman taken hostage. In 1965, Bradbury co-starred with Antonio on Gunsmoke as Allie Sommers in the season eleven episode, "Outlaw's Woman." She returned to play Lucky in the season twelve episode "Muley" in 1967 before portraying the popular Gunsmoke recurring character Merry Florene between 1968 and 1969.

In the 1970s, Bradbury made guest appearances on shows such as Medical Center (1970), The Mod Squad (1970), The Partridge Family (1970), Mannix (1972), Owen Marshall, Counselor at Law (1972), Kung Fu (1973), The Rockford Files (1976), and The Waltons (1979).

She appeared in the popular television movies Maybe I'll Come Home in the Spring (1971), and To Dance with the White Dog (1990).

Bradbury portrayed Hazel Head in the Unsolved Mysteries 2002 episode, "Wanted: Hazel Head".

Her theatrical film credits include Alice Doesn't Live Here Anymore (1974), The Ultimate Warrior (1975), and Major Arcana (2018).

== Personal life ==
In 1965, Bradbury married actor and director Lou Antonio and they had two daughters. The couple divorced in 1980. Their daughter Elkin Antoniou is a writer, director, and documentarian.

She is the founder and artistic director of the Valkyrie Theater of Dance, Drama, and Film, a nonprofit organization whose purpose is to introduce at-risk teens to the theatrical arts.

== Filmography ==
Lane Bradbury film and television credits
Year	Title	Role	Notes	Ref.
1958	Kraft Television Theatre	Piney	Adaptation of The Outcasts of Poker Flat	
1963	The Doctors and the Nurses	Rita Silveri	Episode: "Choice Among Wrongs"	
1964	Bob Hope Presents the Chrysler Theatre	Julia	"Out on the Outskirts of Town" by William Inge	
1964	Mr. Novak	Ellen Westfall	Episode: "Love Among the Grown-Ups"	
1965	The Fugitive	Janet Kegler	Episode: "Wings of an Angel"	
1965	Gunsmoke	Allie Sommers	Episode: "Outlaw's Woman" (S11.E13)	
1967	Gunsmoke	Lucky	Episode: "Muley" (S12.E18)	
1967	Iron Horse	Rachel Sparrow	Episode: "Volcano Wagon"	
1968–1969	Gunsmoke	Merry Florene	Recurring role (4 episodes)	
1969	Judd, for the Defense	Penny Hale	Episode: "Between the Dark and the Daylight"	
1969	Death Valley Days	Ella Stewart	Episode: "A Key for the Fort"	
1969	Then Came Bronson	Bella Mendoza	Episode: "Where Will the Trumpets Be?"	
1970	Dial Hot Line	Pam Carruthers	Television film	
1970	Medical Center	Maggie Seller	Episode: "Between Dark and Daylight"	
1970	Bracken's World	Miriam Halsey	Episode: "Murder Off-Camera"	
1970	The Mod Squad	Cindy Jeffers	Episode: "See the Eagles Dying"	
1970	The Partridge Family	Janet	Episode: "Love at First Slight"	
1970	The Interns	Irene	Episode: "Act of God"	
1971	Maybe I'll Come Home in the Spring	Susie Miller	Television film: ABC Movie of the Week	
1971	The Young Lawyers	Charlene Neiley	Episode: "Down at the House of Truth, Visiting"	
1971	Storefront Lawyers	Unknown	Episode: "The Dark World of Harry Anders"	
1972	Owen Marshall, Counselor at Law	Carol Ann MacMurdy	Episode: "Run Carol Run"	
1972	McCloud	Carol Harrington	Episode: "Give My Regrets to Broadway"	
1972	Mannix	Karin Gundersen	Episode: "Scapegoat"	
1972	Insight	Melanie	Episode: "The Death of Superman"	
1972	Another Part of the Forest	Laurette	TV adaptation of the play by Lillian Hellman	
1972	The F.B.I.	Laura Ann Millpark	Episode: "The Loner"	
1972	Banyon	Bunny	Episode: "A Date with Death"	
1972	Alias Smith and Jones	Ellen Anderson	Episode: "The Day the Amnesty Came Through"	
1972	The Bold Ones: The New Doctors	Cassie Howard	Episode: "Endtheme"	
1973	Kung Fu	Annie Buchanan	Episode: "An Eye for an Eye"	
1974	Banacek	Sally James	Episode: "Horse of a Slightly Different Color"	
1974	The Streets of San Francisco	Rosie Johnson	Episode: "The Hard Breed"	
1974	Doc Elliot	Emily Robbins	Episode: "Things That Might Have Been"	
1974	Alice Doesn't Live Here Anymore	Rita Eberhardt	Theatrical film	
1975	The Ultimate Warrior	Barrie	Theatrical film	
1975	Police Story	Sharon	Episode: "Vice: 24 Hours"	
1976	McMillan & Wife	Jennifer Carter	Episode: "Greed"	
1976	The Rockford Files	Houston Preli	Episode: "Where's Houston?"	
1976	Serpico	Carol	Episode: "The Deadly Game"	
1976	Gemini Man	Amy Nichols	Episode: "Night Train to Dallas"	
1977	Westside Medical	Sister Mary Dolores	Episode: "My Physician, My Friend" (Part 1 & 2)	
1977	Just a Little Inconvenience	B-Girl	Television film	
1978	A Real American Hero	Debbie Pride	Television film	
1979	The Chinese Typewriter	Louise-Jill	Television film	
1979	Breaking Up Is Hard to Do	Ruth Doyle	Television film	
1979	The Waltons	Ronie Cotter	Episode: "The Diploma"	
1980	Where the Ladies Go	Tasha	Television film	
1981	Walking Tall	Kate Reeder	Episode: "Company Town"	
1981	Strike Force	Julie	Episode: "The Predator"	
1986	One Terrific Guy	Unknown	Television film	
1991	Wife, Mother, Murderer	Aunt Frieda	Television film	
1992	I'll Fly Away	Mrs. Anderson	Episode: "Cool Winter Blues"	
1993	Queen	Unknown	Episode #1.3	
1993	Stolen Babies	Meg Wilber	Television film	
1993	To Dance with the White Dog	Mildred Cook	Television film	
1994	A Passion for Justice: The Hazel Brannon Smith Story	Lily Clayburn	Television film	
1994	Oldest Living Confederate Widow Tells All	Mrs. Williams (uncredited)	TV miniseries	
1992	In the Heat of the Night	Myrna Hughes	Episode: "A Time to Trust" (S5.E16)	
1992, 1995	In the Heat of the Night	Trina Yost / Trina	2 episodes	
1996	Savannah	Brian's secretary	3 episodes	
1999	Party of Five	Secretary	Episode: "Wrestling Demons"	
2000	Beyond Belief: Fact or Fiction	Norma	Episode: "The Landlady"	
2002	Unsolved Mysteries	Hazel Head (as Janette Bradbury)	Episode: "Wanted: Hazel Head"	
2018	Deception	Priscilla	Episode: "Code Act"	
2018	Major Arcana	Jean	Theatrical film	
2018, 2019	Billions	Grigor's Mom	2 episodes	
