= Lou Antonio =

American actor and TV director (born 1934)

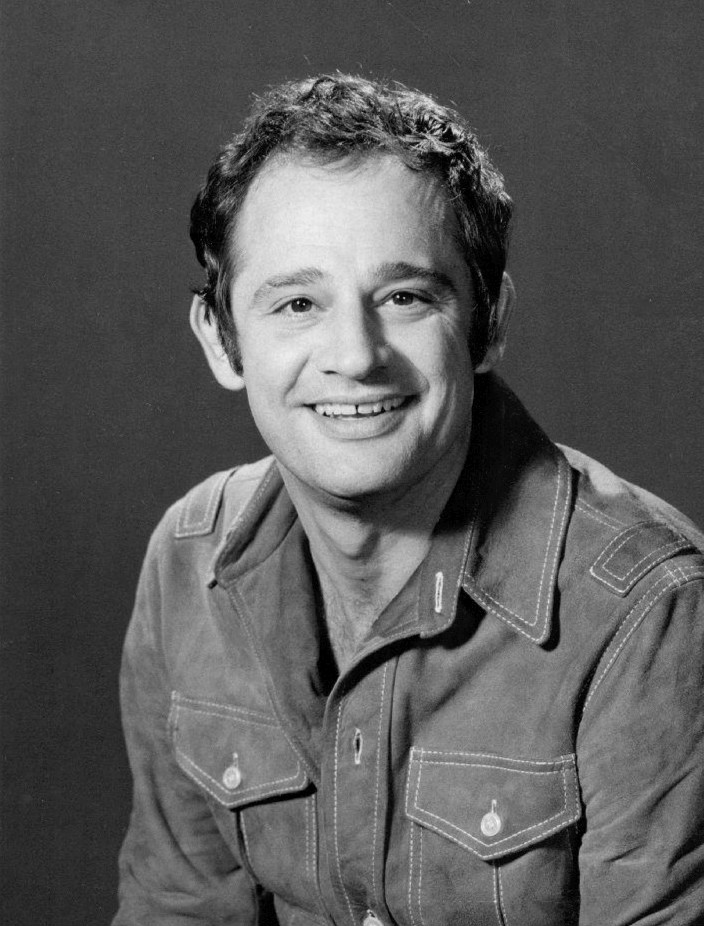
- Antonio in 1973
- Born: Louis Demetrios Antoniou; January 23, 1934 (age 92); Oklahoma City, Oklahoma, U.S.
- Occupations: Actor; director
- Years active: 1960–2007
- Spouse: Lane Bradbury (m. 1965; div. 1980)
- Children: 2

Louis Antonio (born January 23, 1934) is an American actor and TV director best known for performing in the films Cool Hand Luke and America America. He also starred in two short-lived TV series, Dog and Cat, and Makin' It.

== Early life and education ==
Antonio was born Louis Demetrios Antoniou in Oklahoma City of English, French, and German descent on his mother's side and Greek on his father's side (the family name was originally Antoniou). During his teens, he worked as a sports reporter on the Daily Oklahoman. Antonio attended the University of Oklahoma on a journalism scholarship and earned a degree in French. He also took college courses in acting and appeared on stage. He later moved to New York City and studied acting with Lee Strasberg, Curt Conway, and Lonny Chapman.

== Career ==
In January 1962, Antonio was a guest artist at Elmwood Playhouse in Nyack, New York, where he directed Enid Bagnold's The Chalk Garden. In the mid-1960s, Antonio began his career as a television actor, sometimes starring in multiple episodes of the same series, as different characters. These series included The Rookies, The Naked City, Mission: Impossible, Night Gallery, Gunsmoke, The Fugitive, Twelve O'Clock High, The Monkees, The F.B.I., The Defenders, The Mod Squad, Dan August, Cannon, Hawaii Five-O, Bracken's World, The Hardy Boys/Nancy Drew Mysteries, and I Dream of Jeannie. Antonio memorably guest-starred as the human version of a chimpanzee-turned-human on a popular fifth-season episode of Bewitched titled "Going Ape" and played Barney in The Snoop Sisters.

On Star Trek, he co-starred with Frank Gorshin in “Let That Be Your Last Battlefield” (1969), which eventually became one of the most popular of the series. In 2016, The Hollywood Reporter rated “Let That Be Your Last Battlefield” the 11th best television episode of all Star Trek franchise television shows prior to Star Trek: Discovery including live-action and animated series but not counting the movies. Also in 2016, SyFy ranked Antonio and Gorshin (as Bele and Lokai) as the 10th best guest stars on Star Trek: The Original Series.

As a director, Antonio mostly worked in television, notably including: The Flying Nun, The Young Rebels, Banacek, The Partridge Family, The Rockford Files, Owen Marshall: Counselor at Law, Picket Fences, American Gothic, Party of Five, Dawson's Creek, Chicago Hope, CSI: Crime Scene Investigation, and The West Wing. His last work was on Boston Legal in 2007.

== Personal life ==
Antonio was married to fellow Actors Studio member, Lane Bradbury and they had two daughters. The couple divorced in 1980. Their daughter Elkin Antoniou is a writer, director and award-winning documentarian.

Antonio's elder brother, James Antonio, and sister-in-law, Hilda Brawner, are also actors.

== Filmography ==
- 1960 Have Gun-Will Travel (TV Series) as Ted Greive
- 1961 Splendor in the Grass as Oil Field Worker At Party (uncredited)
- 1961 Macbeth (TV Movie)
- 1961-1963 Naked City (TV Series) as Charlie Tepperoni / Ernie / Al Machias / Civil Service Applicant
- 1963 Breaking Point (TV Series) as Paul Knopf
- 1963 Route 66 (TV Series) as Tony Donato
- 1962-1963 The Defenders (TV Series) as Danny Norton / Bo Jackson / Sam
- 1963 America, America as Osman
- 1963-1966 The Fugitive (TV Series) as Don / Matt Mooney / Vinnie
- 1965 For the People
- 1964-1965 Twelve O'Clock High (TV Series) as Captain Bing Pollard / Captain Wade Ritchie
- 1966 The Virginian (TV Series) as Niles Tait
- 1966 The Wackiest Ship in the Army (TV Series) as Jocko
- 1966 Hawaii as Reverend Abraham Hewlett
- 1966 Hawk (TV Series) as Frankie Gellen
- 1966 Gunsmoke (TV Series) as Harve Kane
- 1967 The Road West (TV Series) as Mike Kerkorian
- 1967 The Monkees (TV Series) as Judd in S2:E7, "Hillbilly Honeymoon"
- 1967 Cool Hand Luke as Koko
- 1968 I Dream of Jeannie (TV Series) as Charley
- 1968 The Danny Thomas Hour (TV Series) as Stefanos
- 1968 Bonanza (TV Series) as Davey
- 1968-1980 Insight (TV Series) as Burglar / J.P.
- 1969 Star Trek (TV Series) as Lokai in S3:E15, "Let That Be Your Last Battlefield"
- 1969 Gentle Ben (TV Series) as Kee Cho
- 1965-1969 Gunsmoke (TV Series) as Mace / Smiley / Curt Tynan / Rich / Harve Kane
- 1969 Bewitched (TV Series) as Harry Simmons
- 1970 Sole Survivor (TV Movie) as Tony
- 1969-1970 Here Come the Brides (TV Series) as Telly Theodakis
- 1970 The Flying Nun (TV Series) as The Stone Mason (uncredited)
- 1970 The Phynx as Corrigan
- 1970-1971 The Mod Squad (TV Series) as Arnold Kane / Case
- 1970 Bracken's World (TV Series) as Hal Ingersol
- 1970 Storefront Lawyers (TV Series) as Walter Babson
- 1971 Dan August (TV Series) as Gordon Krager
- 1971 Hawaii Five-O (TV Series) as David Harper
- 1971 Cannon (TV Series) as Arnie Crawford
- 1970-1972 Mission: Impossible (TV Series) as Rudy Blake / Robert Siomney
- 1972 Cade's County (TV Series) as Frank Cameron
- 1973 Night Gallery (TV Series) as Jake
- 1973 Partners in Crime (TV Movie) as Sam Hatch
- 1971-1973 The F.B.I. (TV Series) as Parrish / Arlen Parent
- 1973-1974 The Snoop Sisters (TV Series) as Barney
- 1973-1974 The Rookies (TV Series) as Jack Lembo / Jay Warfield
- 1977 Dog and Cat (TV Series) as Sergeant Jack Ramsey
- 1977 The Hardy Boys/Nancy Drew Mysteries (TV Series) as The Director
- 1979 Makin' It (TV Series) as Joseph Manucci
- 1980 Where The Ladies Go (TV Movie) as Hugo
- 1985 Thirteen at Dinner (TV Movie) as Movie Producer (uncredited)
- 1990 Face to Face (Hallmark Hall of Fame presentation, TV Movie) as Dr. Calvin Finch
- 2003 Frankie and Johnny Are Married as Lou Antonio

== As director ==
- Heroic Mission (1967)
- Then Came Bronson (1969)
- The Flying Nun (1969–70)
- Here Come the Brides (1970)
- The Young Rebels (1970)
- Getting Together (1971)
- The Partridge Family (1971–1972)
- Owen Marshall, Counselor at Law (1971–1973)
- Banacek (1972)
- The Rookies (1973)
- Griff (1973; also writer)
- Love Is Not Forever (1974)
- Fools, Females and Fun (1974)
- Amy Prentiss (1974)
- Someone I Touched (1975)
- McCloud (1972–1975)
- McMillan & Wife (1975–1976)
- The Rockford Files (1974–1976)
- Lanigan's Rabbi (1976)
- Delvecchio (1976)
- Rich Man, Poor Man Book II (1976)
- Something for Joey (1977)
- The Girl in the Empty Grave (1977)
- The Gypsy Warriors (1978)
- The Critical List (1978)
- A Real American Hero (1978)
- The Chinese Typewriter (1979)
- Silent Victory: The Kitty O'Neil Story (1979)
- Heaven on Earth (1979)
- Breaking Up Is Hard to Do (1979)
- The Contender (1980)
- We're Fighting Back (1981)
- The Star Maker (1981)
- The Steeler and the Pittsburgh Kid (1981)
- Something So Right (1982)
- Between Friends (1983)
- A Good Sport (1984)
- Threesome (1984)
- Rearview Mirror (1984)
- Thirteen at Dinner (1985)
- One Terrific Guy (1986)
- Shell Game (1987)
- Pals (1987)
- Mayflower Madam (1987)
- The Outside Woman (1989; also producer)
- Dark Holiday (1989; also executive producer)
- Face to Face (Hallmark Hall of Fame presentation; 1990)
- Sporting Chance (1990)
- This Gun for Hire (1991)
- Lies Before Kisses (1991)
- The Last Prostitute (1991)
- The Rape of Doctor Willis (1991)
- A Taste for Killing (1992)
- Nightmare in the Daylight (1992)
- The Contender (1993)
- Party of Five (1994)
- Diagnosis: Murder (1994)
- Chicago Hope (1995)
- The Cosby Mysteries (1995)
- American Gothic (1995)
- Picket Fences (1993–1996)
- Dark Skies (1996)
- Mr & Mrs. Smith (1996)
- Spy Game (1997)
- Roar (1997)
- Dawson's Creek (1998)
- Vengeance Unlimited (1998)
- To Have & To Hold
- Wasteland (1999)
- The Force (1999)
- Get Real (1999)
- Felicity (2000)
- The West Wing (2001)
- CSI: Crime Scene Investigation (2000–2001; also editor)
- UC: Undercover (2001)
- The Guardian (2001)
- First Monday (2002)
- The Handler (2003)
- Numb3rs (2003)
- Reunion (2005)
- Boston Legal (2006–2007)
