= Robert Totten =

American television director, writer, and actor

- Born: Robert Charles Totten; February 5, 1937; Los Angeles, California, U.S.
- Died: January 27, 1995 (aged 57); Sherman Oaks, California, U.S.
- Years active: 1961–1990
- Organizations: Directors Guild of America; Writers Guild of America; Screen Actors Guild

Robert Charles Totten (February 5, 1937 – January 27, 1995) was an American television director, writer, and actor, best known for directing 25 Gunsmoke episodes, Henry Fonda's adaptation of The Red Pony, and Louis L'Amour's The Sacketts miniseries.

== Career ==
In addition to directing, Totten also co-starred in Gunsmoke playing the role of Corley, opposite of Nehemiah Persoff, in the 1969 episode "The Mark of Cain." He also played Cleavus Lukens, the childhood friend of Festus in an episode named for his role.

As director, writer, and actor, Totten is a member all three guilds; the Directors Guild of America, the Writers Guild of America and the Screen Actors Guild.

== Awards ==
Totten was nominated at the 25th Primetime Emmy Awards for Outstanding Writing in Drama - Adaptation for his work on the 1973 television film, The Red Pony.

== Death ==
Totten died at the age of 57 on January 27, 1995, from a heart attack at his home in Sherman Oaks, California.

== Filmography ==
A partial filmography follows.

=== Film ===
Director

Year	Title	Role
1963	The Quick and the Dead	
1969	Death of a Gunfighter	Credited as Alan Smithee
1969	Ride a Northbound Horse	
1970	The Wild Country	
1973	The Mystery in Dracula's Castle	
1976	Pony Express Rider	Also writer

Actor

Year	Title	Role
1979	The Apple Dumpling Gang Rides Again	Blainey

=== Television ===
Writer

- Gunsmoke (1968) - "Nowhere to Run" (S13E18)

Director

Gunsmoke (1966–71)

- "My Father's Guitar" (S11E21)
- "My Father, My Son" (S11E30)
- "Prime of Life" (S11E32)
- "The Good People" (S12E5)
- "The Wrong Man" (S12E7)
- "The Newcomers" (S12E11)
- "Saturday Night" (S12E16)
- "Mail Drop" (S12E19)
- "Mistaken Identity" (S12E26)
- "Nitro!" (S12E28 & S12E29)
- "The Wreckers" (S13E1)
- "A Hat" (S13E6)
- "Major Glory" (S13E8)
- "Blood Money" (S13E19)
- "Hill Girl" (S13E20)
- "The First People" (S13E23)
- "Waco" (S14E11)
- "Stryker" (S15E2)
- "A Matter of Honor" (S15E9)
- "Stark" (S16E3)
- "The Scavengers" (S16E10)
- "Jenny" (S16E15)
- "Murdoch" (S16E20)
- "The Lost" (S17E1)

Other shows (1962–90)

- The Gallant Men (1962) - S1E13 "Advance and Be Recognized"
- Hawaiian Eye (1962–1963)
  - "Lament for a Saturday Warrior" (S4E5)
  - "To See, Perchance to Dream" (S4E9)
  - "Two Too Many" (S4E16)
  - "The Long Way Home" (S4E19)
- Temple Houston (1963)
  - "Letter of the Law" (S1E3)
  - "Gallows in Galilee" (S1E6)
  - "Jubilee" (S1E8)
  - "Seventy Times Seven" (S1E11)
- The Virginian (1964) - "The Secret of Brynmar Hall" (S2E26)
- Bonanza (1965)
  - "Dead and Gone" (S6E27)
  - "A Natural Wizard" (S7E13)
- The Legend of Jesse James (1965–1966)
- Daniel Boone (1966) - "The Gun" (S2E20)
- Iron Horse (1966) - "Cougar Man" (S1E7)
- The Monroes (1966) - "War Arrow" (S1E9)
- The Wackiest Ship in the Army (1966)
  - The Lamb Who Hunted Wolves (S1E16 & S1E17)
  - Brother Love (S1E21)
- Mission: Impossible (1968)
  - The Phoenix (S3E23)
  - Recovery (S3E25)
- Dan August (1970) - "When the Shouting Dies" (S1E10)
- Bearcats! (1971)
- Kung Fu (1973)
  - "The Tong" (S2E7)
  - "The Hoots" (S2E10)
- The Red Pony (1973)
- Huckleberry Finn (1975)
- The Fitzpatricks (1977) - "Say Goodbye to Buddy Bonkers" (S1E10)
- The Sacketts (1979)
- Enos (1981) - "House Cleaners" (S1E7)
- Magnum, P.I. (1981) - "Double Jeopardy" (S2E19)
- The Young Riders (1990) - "The Man Behind the Badge" (S1E21)

Actor

Year	Title	Role	Episode
1969-1974	Gunsmoke	Corley	"The Mark of Cain"
1969-1974	Gunsmoke	Ben Miller	"The Long Night"
1969-1974	Gunsmoke	Tully	"Hackett"
1969-1974	Gunsmoke	Abner	"Gentry's Law"
1969-1974	Gunsmoke	Blacksmith	"Captain Sligo"
1969-1974	Gunsmoke	Cleavus Lukens	"Cleavus"
1969-1974	Gunsmoke	Josh Walker	"Alias Festus Haggen"
1969-1974	Gunsmoke	Eli Snider	"Talbot"
1970	Cutter's Trail	Thatcher	TV movie
1974	Dirty Sally	Cave	"My Fair Laddie"
1983-1987	Simon & Simon	Mechanic Feltzer	"The Secret of the Chrome Eagle"
1983-1987	Simon & Simon	Man #1	"Lost Lady"
