= Ken Curtis =

American actor and singer (1916–1991)

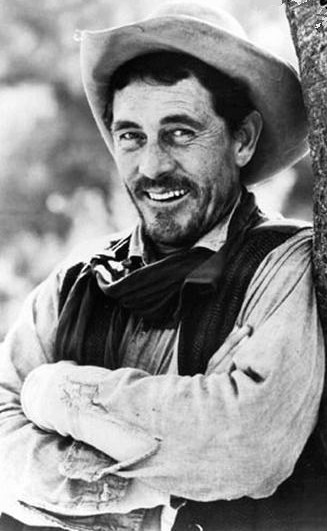
- Curtis as Festus Haggen 1964
- Born: Curtis Wain Gates; July 2, 1916; Lamar, Colorado, U.S.
- Died: April 28, 1991 (aged 74); Fresno, California, U.S.
- Occupations: Actor; singer
- Years active: 1941–1991
- Height: 6 ft 0 in (183 cm)
- Spouses: Lorraine Page (m. 1942, divorced) Barbara Ford (m. 1952; div. 1964) Torrie Ahern Connelly (m. 1966)
- Children: 2 Step-Children

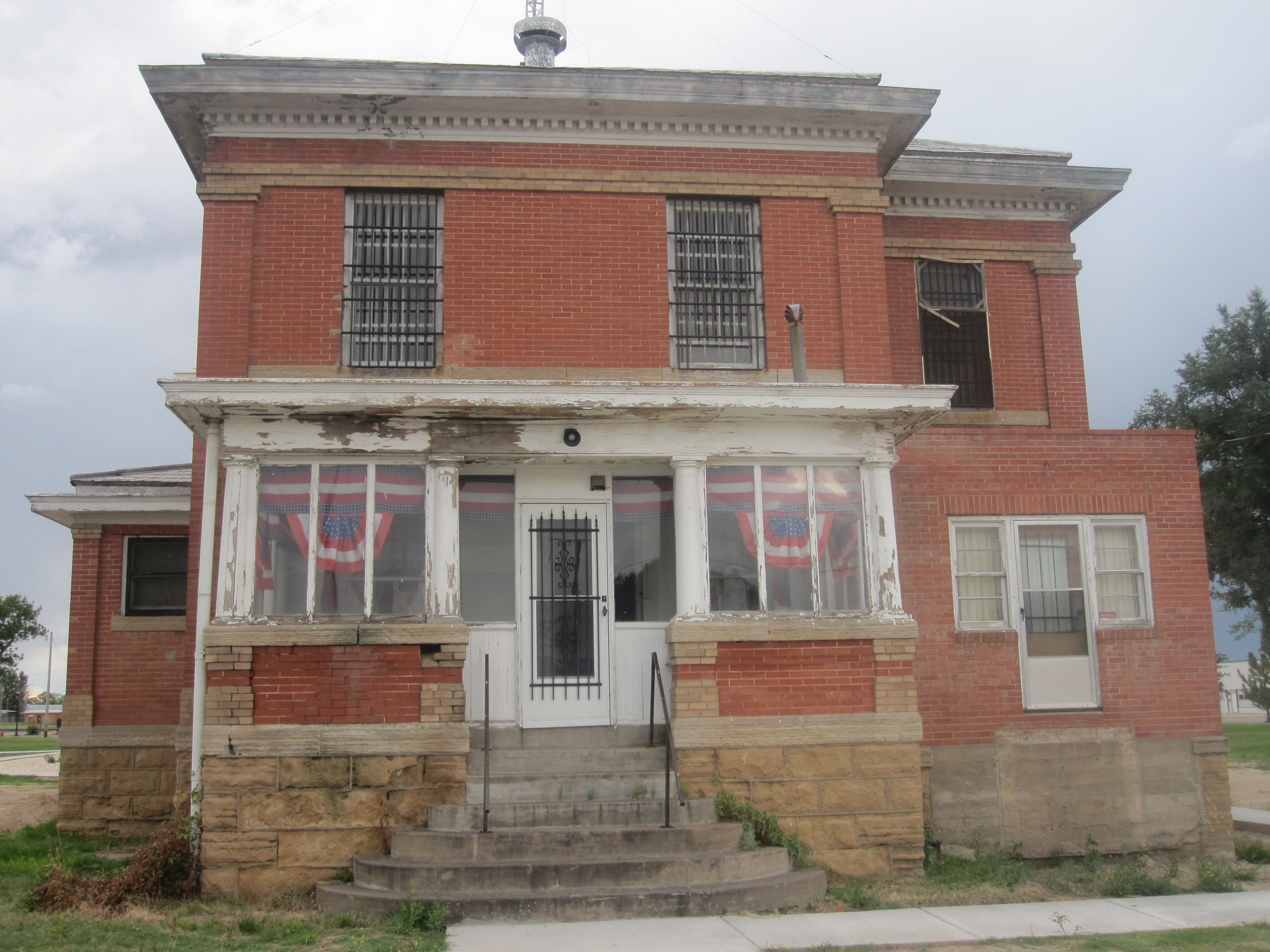
The old Bent County jail in Las Animas in southeastern Colorado, where Ken Curtis lived as a boy

Ken Curtis (born Curtis Wain Gates; July 2, 1916 – April 28, 1991) was an American actor and singer best known for his role as Festus Haggen on the Western television series Gunsmoke.

He was also a member of the veteran vocal group Sons of the Pioneers, with whom he made live appearances and recordings from 1949 to 1953; from 1955 to 1957 he sang with the Pioneers on recordings only.

== Early years ==
Curtis was born on July 2, 1916, as the youngest of three boys in Lamar in Prowers County in southeastern Colorado. He lived his first 10 years on a ranch on Muddy Creek in eastern Bent County. In 1926, the family moved to Las Animas, the county seat of Bent County, so that his father, Dan Sullivan Gates, could run for sheriff. The campaign was successful, and Gates served from 1926 to 1931 as Bent County sheriff.

Curtis was the quarterback of his Bent County High School football team and played clarinet in the school band. He graduated in 1935. During World War II, Curtis served in the U.S. Army from 1943 to 1945.

He attended Colorado College to study medicine, but left after a short time to pursue his musical career.

== Career ==
=== Music ===
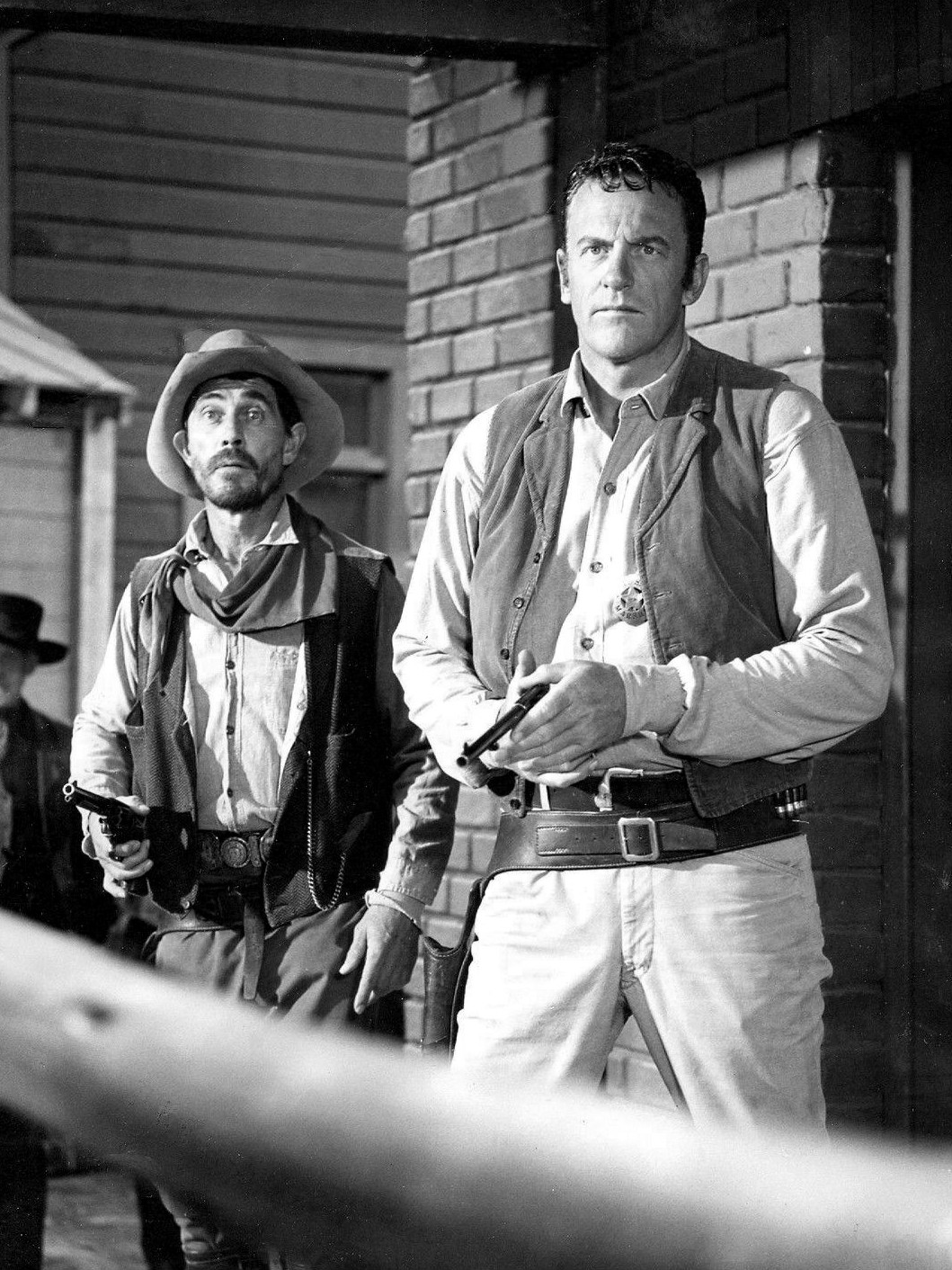
Ken Curtis as Festus Haggen and James Arness as Matt Dillon, 1968

Curtis was a singer before moving into acting, and combined both careers once he entered films. He sang with bandleaders Shep Fields and Tommy Dorsey.

=== Film ===
Columbia Pictures signed Curtis to a contract in 1945. He starred in a series of musical Westerns with the Hoosier Hot Shots, playing singing cowboy romantic leads.

By virtue of his second marriage, Curtis was a son-in-law of film director John Ford. Curtis teamed with Ford and John Wayne in Rio Grande. He was a singer in the movie's fictional band, The Regimental Singers, who actually consisted of the Sons of the Pioneers; Curtis is not listed as a member of the principal cast. Possibly, he played a bit part, but Curtis is best remembered as Charlie McCorry in The Searchers, and for his appearances in The Quiet Man, The Wings of Eagles, The Horse Soldiers, The Alamo, and How the West Was Won. Curtis also joined Ford, along with Henry Fonda, James Cagney, William Powell, and Jack Lemmon, in the comedy Navy classic Mister Roberts. He was featured in all three of the only films produced by Cornelius Vanderbilt Whitney's C. V. Whitney Pictures: The Searchers (1956); The Missouri Traveler (1958) with Brandon deWilde and Lee Marvin; and The Young Land (1959) with Patrick Wayne and Dennis Hopper. In 5 Steps to Danger (1957 film), he is uncredited as FBI Agent Jim Anderson. Curtis also produced two extremely low-budget monster films in 1959, The Killer Shrews and The Giant Gila Monster.

Curtis guest-starred five times on the Western television series Have Gun – Will Travel with Richard Boone. In 1959, he appeared as cowhand Phil Jakes on the Gunsmoke season-four episode, "Jayhawkers". He also guest-starred as circus performer Tim Durant on an episode of Perry Mason, "The Case of the Clumsy Clown", which originally aired on November 5, 1960. Later, he appeared in Ripcord, a first-run syndicated action/adventure series about a company of its namesake providing skydiving services, along with its leading star Larry Pennell. This series ran from 1961 to 1963 with 76 half-hour episodes in total. Curtis played the role of James (Jim) Buckley and Pennell was his young disciple Theodore (Ted) McKeever. This television show helped generate interest in sport parachuting.

In 1964, Curtis appeared as muleskinner Graydon in the episode "Graydon's Charge" of the syndicated Western television series, Death Valley Days, also guest-starring Denver Pyle and Cathy Lewis.

=== Gunsmoke ===
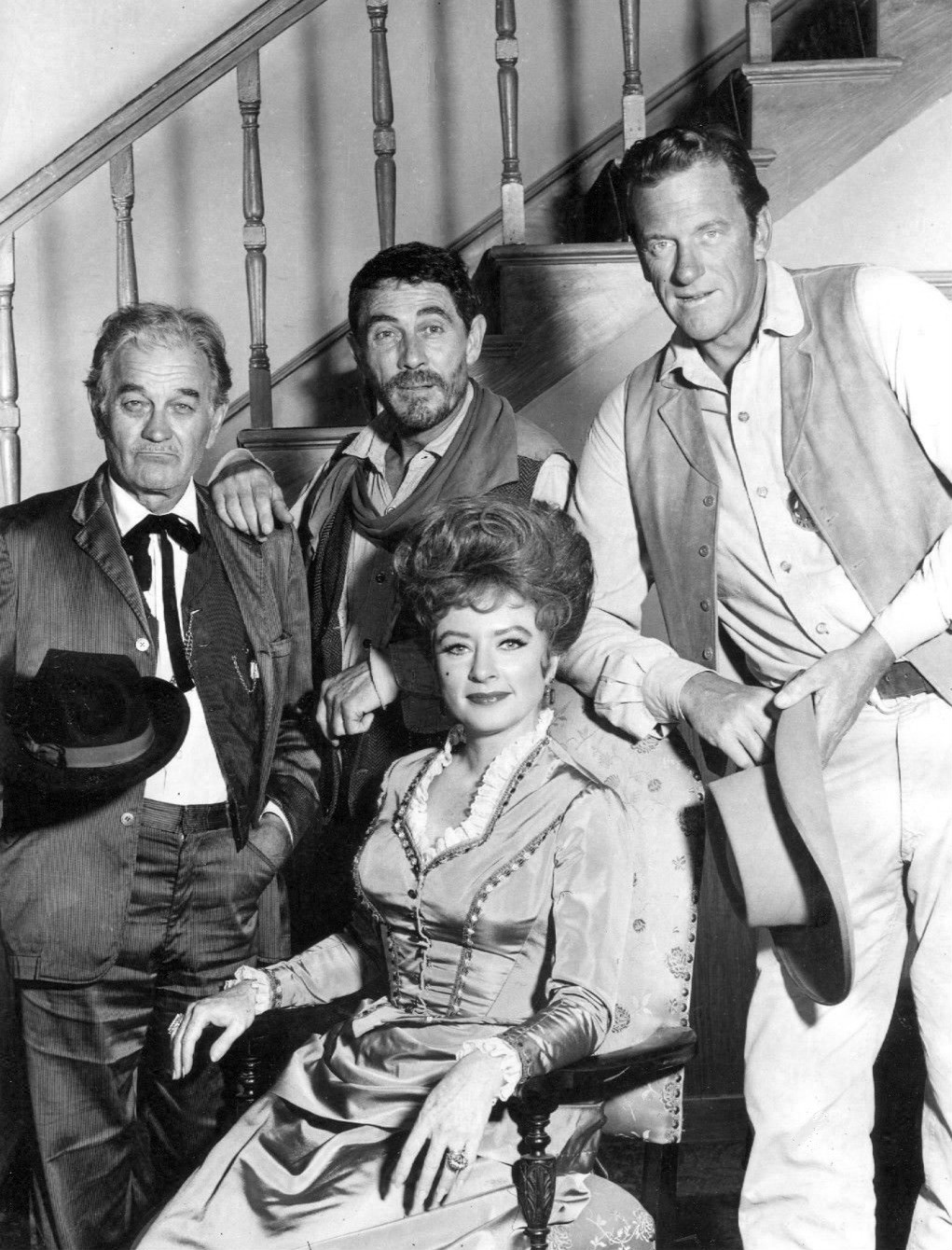
Milburn Stone, Ken Curtis, Amanda Blake, and James Arness

Curtis remains best known for his role as Festus Haggen, the scruffy, cantankerous, and illiterate deputy in Gunsmoke. He first appeared in 1962 and joined the regular Gunsmoke cast in 1964, replacing Chester Goode, played by Dennis Weaver. While Marshal Matt Dillon had a total of five deputies over two decades, Festus held the role the longest (11 years), in 304 episodes. Festus was patterned after "Cedar Jack" (Frederick Munden), a man from Curtis' Las Animas childhood. Cedar Jack, who lived 15 miles south of town, made a living cutting cedar fence posts. Curtis observed many times that Jack came to Las Animas, where he would often end up drunk and in Curtis' father's jail. Festus' character was known, in part, for the nasally, twangy, rural accent which Curtis developed for the role, but which did not reflect Curtis' actual voice.

Besides engaging in the usual personal appearances most television stars undertake to promote their careers, Curtis also traveled around the country performing at Western-themed stage shows at fairs, rodeos, and other venues when Gunsmoke was not in production, and even for some years after the show was cancelled. Curtis also campaigned for Ronald Reagan in 1976, during the future President's attempt to secure the Republican nomination from incumbent Gerald Ford.

In two episodes of Gunsmoke, Carroll O'Connor was a guest star; years later, Curtis guest-starred as a retired police detective on O'Connor's NBC program In the Heat of the Night. He voiced Nutsy the Vulture in Disney's 1973 animated film Robin Hood. A decade later, he returned to television in the short-lived Western series The Yellow Rose, in which he performed most of his scenes with Noah Beery, Jr.

=== Latter years ===
In 1981, Curtis was inducted into the Western Performers Hall of Fame at the National Cowboy & Western Heritage Museum in Oklahoma City, Oklahoma.

Curtis' last acting role was as the aging cattle rancher Seaborn Tay in the television production Conagher (1991), by Western author Louis L'Amour. Sam Elliott, who had guest-starred on Gunsmoke early in his career, starred in the lead role, and Curtis' Gunsmoke co-star Buck Taylor (Newly O'Brien) played a bad man in the same film. Buck Taylor's father, Dub Taylor, had a minor role in it. The movie aired posthumously two months after his death.

== Personal life ==
Curtis married Torrie Connelly in 1966. They were married until his death in 1991 and he had two step-children. Curtis was a Republican and supported Barry Goldwater in the 1964 United States presidential election.

== Death ==
Curtis died on April 28, 1991, in his sleep in Fresno, California, after suffering a heart attack. He was 74. He was cremated, and his ashes were scattered in the Colorado flatlands.

== Legacy ==
A statue of Ken Curtis as Festus can be found at 430 Pollasky Avenue in Clovis, California, in Fresno County in front of the Educational Employees Credit Union. In his later years, Curtis resided in Clovis.

== Selected filmography ==
- Santa Fe Trail (1940) — Officer singing at celebration (uncredited)
- Rhythm Round-Up (1945) — Jimmy Benson
- Song of the Prairie (1945) — Dan Tyler
- Out of the Depths (1945) — Buck Clayton
- Throw a Saddle on a Star (1946) — Curt Walker
- That Texas Jamboree (1946) — Curt Chambers
- Cowboy Blues (1946) — Curt Durant
- Singing on the Trail (1946) — Curt Stanton
- Lone Star Moonlight (1946) — Curt Norton
- Over the Santa Fe Trail (1947) — Curt Mason
- Riders of the Pony Express (1949) — Tom Blake
- Stallion Canyon (1949) — Curt Benson
- Call of the Forest (1949) — Bob Brand
- Everybody's Dancing' (1950) — Ken — Member Sons of the Pioneers
- Rio Grande (1950) — Donnelly — Regimental Singer (uncredited)
- Don Daredevil Rides Again (1951) — Lee Hadley aka Don Daredevil
- Fighting Coast Guard (1951) — Ken — Member Sons of the Pioneers
- The Quiet Man (1952) — Dermot Fahy (uncredited)
- The Long Gray Line (1955) — Specialty (uncredited)
- Mr. Roberts (1955) — Yeoman 3rd Class Dolan
- The Searchers (1956) — Charlie McCorry
- 5 Steps to Danger (1956) — FBI Agent Jim Anderson (uncredited)
- The Wings of Eagles (1957) — John Dale Price
- Spring Reunion (1957) — Al
- The Missouri Traveler (1958) — Fred Mueller
- The Last Hurrah (1958) — Monsignor Killian
- Escort West (1958) — Trooper Burch
- The Young Land (1959) — Lee Hearn
- The Horse Soldiers (1959) — Cpl. Wilkie
- The Killer Shrews (1959) — Jerry Farrell
- My Dog, Buddy (1960) — Dr. Lusk
- Freckles (1960) — Wessner
- The Alamo (1960) — Capt. Almeron Dickinson
- Two Rode Together (1961) — Greeley Clegg
- How the West Was Won (1962) — Cpl. Ben (uncredited)
- Cheyenne Autumn (1964) — Joe
- Robin Hood (1973) — Nutsy, the Vulture (voice)
- Pony Express Rider (1976) — Jed Richardson
- Legend of the Wild (1981)
- Lost (1983)
- Once Upon a Texas Train (1988) — Kelly Sutton (John Henry's Gang)
- Conagher (1991, TV Movie) — Seaborn Tay, Cattle Rancher (final film role)

== Television ==
- The Life and Legend of Wyatt Earp (1957) — episode — Warpath — Major Hendericks (uncredited)
- Gunsmoke (1959) — episode — Change of Heart —
- Gunsmoke (1960) — episode — Speak Me Fair — Scout
- Gunsmoke (1959) — episode — Jayhawkers – Jacks
- Have Gun – Will Travel (1959–1960) — Monk
- Gunsmoke (1960) — episode — The Ex-Urbanites — Jesse
- Wagon Train (1960) — episode — The Horace Best Story — Pappy Lightfoot
- Wagon Train (1960) — S4 E9 — The Colter Craven Story — Kyle Cleatus
- Perry Mason (1960) — S4 E7 (102) The Case of the Clumsy Clown- Tim Durant
- Sea Hunt (1961) — episode — The Octopus Story — Professor Dean Austin – Season 4, Episode 20
- Ripcord (1961–1963) — Skydiver James (Jim) Buckley
- The Aquanauts (1961) — two episodes — Horton/head waiter
- Rawhide (1961) – Vic Slade in S3:E24, "Incident of the Lost Idol"
- Gunsmoke (1962–1975) — Festus (304 episodes)
- Gunsmoke (1963) episode — Lover Boy — Kyle Kelly
- Death Valley Days (1964) — Graydon's Charge — Graydon
- The Life and Times of Grizzly Adams (1978) — episode — Once Upon a Starry Night — Uncle Ned
- Vega$ (1979) — Digger Dennison
- How the West Was Won (1979) — Sheriff Orville Gant
- The Yellow Rose (1983–1984) — Hoyt Coryell
- Airwolf (1986) — Cecil Carnes Sr.
- In the Heat of the Night (1990) — Tom McCaul
- Conagher (1991) — Seaborn Tay
