= Buck Taylor =

American actor and artist (born 1938)

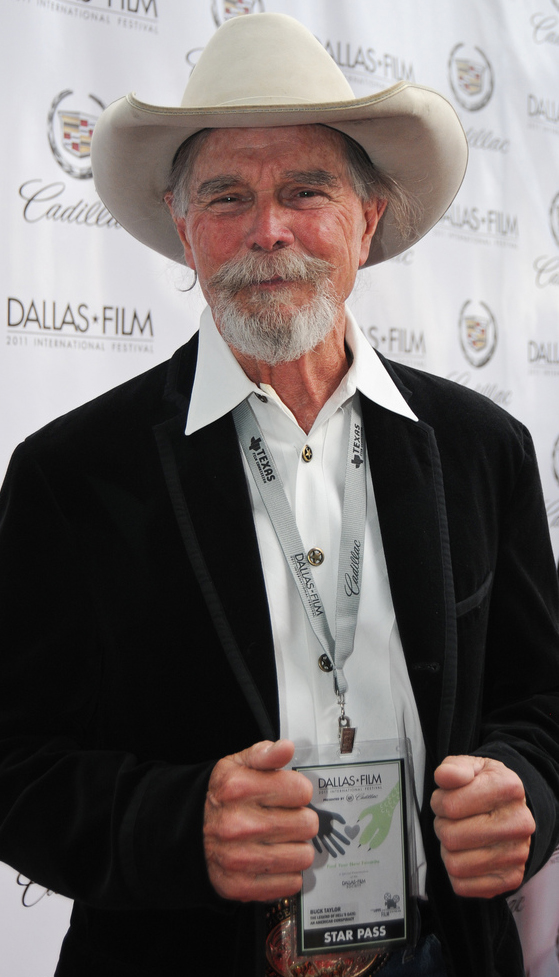
- Taylor at the 2011 Dallas International Film Festival
- Born: Walter Clarence Taylor III; May 13, 1938 (age 88); Los Angeles, California, U.S.
- Occupations: Actor, artist
- Years active: 1961–present
- Spouses: Judy Nugent (m. 1961; div. 1981) Goldie Ann Taylor (m. 1995)
- Parent: Dub Taylor (father)
- Website: www.bucktaylor.com

Buck Taylor (born Walter Clarence Taylor III, May 13, 1938) is an American actor and artist, best known for his roles as gunsmith-turned-Deputy U.S Marshal Newly O'Brien in the CBS television series Gunsmoke, and as Emmett Walsh on Yellowstone.

== Early life and career ==
Taylor is the son of character actor Dub Taylor, from whom Buck reportedly acquired his nickname simply because, having clocked in at a hefty nine pounds at birth, he "looked like a big buck." Taylor graduated from North Hollywood High School, where he became a talented gymnast. Actor Guinn "Big Boy" Williams sponsored him to go to the U.S. Olympic Trials as a gymnast, but he failed to qualify for the 1960 Summer Olympics. He served two years in the United States Navy.

His first important acting role was as Trooper Shattuck in the 1961 Dick Powell's Zane Grey Theatre episode "Image of a Drawn Sword". His other early roles were in a 1964 episode of The Outer Limits entitled "Don't Open Till Doomsday", and as John Bradford (Brad) in four episodes of the 1966 ABC Western series The Monroes.

== Gunsmoke ==
From 1967 to 1975, Taylor played Newly O'Brien in the television series Gunsmoke. He replaced Deputy U.S. Marshal Clayton Thaddeus Greenwood, played by Roger Ewing, after Ewing left the show. The character came to Dodge City, Kans as a gunsmith, and later became a Deputy U.S. Marshal. He reprised his role in the 1987 television movie Gunsmoke: Return to Dodge, where he played the Dodge City Town Marshal.

In 1981, the National Cowboy & Western Heritage Museum inducted Taylor into the Cowboy Hall of Fame, and awarded him the Trustee Award for his performance on Gunsmoke.

== Artwork ==
Taylor attended the Chouinard Art Institute, and has been selling his watercolor and acrylic paintings of cowboys, Native Americans, and horses since 1993. Many of his paintings are of characters and scenes from movies and television series in which he has appeared. These images are made into prints, which are sold in various sizes. He is the official artist for many rodeos and state fairs, and creates their promotional posters.

== Filmography ==
=== Film ===
- 1964 - Ensign Pulver as Mannion (uncredited)
- 1966 - ...And Now Miguel as Gabriel
- 1966 - The Wild Angels as Dear John
- 1967 - Devil's Angels as Gage
- 1967 - The St. Valentine's Day Massacre as Poolside Interviewer #2 (uncredited)
- 1976 - Pony Express Rider as Bovey Kingman
- 1978 - Doc Hooker's Bunch as Mike Lassiter
- 1978 - Beartooth
- 1981 - Cattle Annie and Little Britches as Dynamite Dick
- 1981 - The Legend of the Lone Ranger as Robert Edward Gattlin
- 1983 - Triumphs of a Man Called Horse as Sgt. Bridges
- 1988 - Dark Before Dawn as Charlie
- 1990 - Big Bad John as Bob Simmons
- 1990 - Payback as Nick
- 1993 - Gettysburg as Colonel William Gamble
- 1993 - Tombstone as John "Turkey Creek Jack" Johnson
- 1999 - Wild Wild West as Eye-Crossed Reb
- 2000 - Jericho as Pap Doolin
- 2003 - Gods and Generals as General Maxcy Gregg
- 2003 - Screen Door Jesus as Old Man Nickles
- 2004 - The Alamo as Settler
- 2004 - Grand Champion as Big Texas Show Judge
- 2005 - The Wendell Baker Story as Bob Draper
- 2005 - Truce as Harry Dodds
- 2005 - Hell to Pay as Dr. Adam Galen
- 2005 - Miracle at Sage Creek as Buckskin Charlie
- 2006 - Flicka as Wagner
- 2007 - The Mist as Ambrose Cornell
- 2009 - Just Another Day as Bodyguard
- 2010 - Cactus Creek as Marshal Trevor Cooper
- 2011 - The Legend of Hell's Gate: An American Conspiracy as Pete Snyder
- 2011 - Cowboys & Aliens as Wes Claibourne
- 2013 - The Road to Valhalla as Self, and also as Union Veteran (documentary)
- 2015 - Rodeo & Juliet as Judge Brandon Lawrence
- 2015 - Canyon Trail as Marshal Trevor Cooper
- 2016 - Indiscretion as Abe
- 2016 - Hell or High Water as Old Man
- 2016 - Bender as Sheriff J.E. Stone
- 2017 - Color Me You as Richard Donnegan
- 2019 - Trading Paint as Ben
- 2022 - The Contested Plains as Rufus Brown
- 2023 - Two Sinners and a Mule as Sheriff Cleetus
- 2024 - Carry You Home as Retired Texas Ranger
- 2025 - Sod & Stubble as John C. Haag

=== Television ===
Year	Title	Role	Notes
1961	Zane Grey Theatre	Trooper Shattuck	S5:E29 "Image of a Drawn Sword"
1961	The Rebel	Gunman	S2:E35 "Mission: Varina"
1962	The Alfred Hitchcock Hour	Officer Frazier	S1:E10 "Day of Reckoning"
1962	Have Gun - Will Travel	Eddie	Season 6: Episode 16 "The Treasure"
1962-1963	Stoney Burke	Young Racer / Joey Kilgore / Mule	3 episodes
1963	Going My Way	Mickey	S1:E15 "My Son the Social Worker"
1963	The Eleventh Hour	Willie	S1:E23 "The Wings of the Morning"
1963	The Fugitive	Jamie	S1:E13 "Terror at High Point"
1963	Johnny Shiloh	Josh	TV movie
1963-1964	The Greatest Show on Earth	Joe / Tony	2 episodes
1964	The Outer Limits	Gard Hayde	S1:E17 "Don't Open Till Doomsday"
1964	My Favorite Martian	Bruce Baker	S1:E34 "The Disastro-Nauts"
1964	Ben Casey	Eddie Boyd	S4:E2 "A Bird in the Solitude Singing"
1964	Bonanza	Billy	Season 6: Episode 2 "The Hostage"
1964	The Adventures of Ozzie and Harriet	Carlisle / Pete	2 episodes
1964	Karen	Jim Fraser	Season 1: Episode 4 "Home, James"
1964	12 O'Clock High	Corporal Dennis Moody	Season 1: Episode 7 "Decision"
1964-1965	Mr. Novak	Nick Bradley / Scott Lawson / Don	3 episodes
1964-1965	My Three Sons	Howard Sears	2 episodes
1964-1966	The Virginian	Deputy Plumb / Scott Briscoe / Lem Bliss	3 episodes
1965	Wagon Train	Skeeter Ames	S8:E15 "The Chottsie Gubenheimer Story"
1965	The Alfred Hitchcock Hour	Dancer Smith	S3:E20 "Death Scene"
1965	The Legend of Jesse James	John Bedford	S1:E2 "The Dead Man's Hand"
1965	The Big Valley	Turk	S1:E4 "The Young Marauders"
1965-1966	Combat!	Tobin / Jeetleman	2 episodes
1966	Branded	US Cavalry Corporal	S2:E19 "A Destiny Which Made Us Brothers"
1966	The F.B.I.	Ed Rule	Season 2: Episode 4 "The Cave-In"
1966	Daniel Boone	Jonathan Warren	S3:E12 "The Lost Colony"
1966-1967	The Monroes	John "Brad" Bradford	4 episodes
1967	Gunsmoke	Leonard Parker	S13:E4 “Vengeance!: Part 1”
1967-1975	Gunsmoke	Newly O'Brien	172 episodes
1968-1969	Death Valley Days	Billy Stiles / Will Zane	2 episodes
1977	Barnaby Jones	Foster	S6:E10 "Shadow of Fear"
1978	Standing Tall	George Fewster	TV movie
1978	Kate Bliss and the Ticker Tape Kid	Joe	TV movie
1978	The Busters	Billy Burnett	TV movie
1979	The Sacketts	Reed Carney	miniseries
1980	Wild Times	Joe McBride	miniseries
1982	Dangerous Company	Petrie	TV movie
1982	The Fall Guy	Clyde	Season 1: Episode 18 "Child's Play"
1983	Matt Houston	Renfield	S2:E2 "The Woman in White"
1984	No Man's Land	Feeny	TV movie
1984-1986	T.J. Hooker	Sam Rand / Officer Phillips	2 episodes
1984-1987	Simon & Simon	Buddy / Jackson Fischer	2 episodes
1985	Crazy Like a Fox	Blake	S1:E13 "The Man Who Cried Fox"
1985	Wildside	Captain Angus Flint	Season 1: Episode 5 "Buffalo Who?"
1985	General Hospital	Ralph Russell	
1985	Wild Horses	Cowboy	TV movie
1986	Dream West	Egloffstein	miniseries
1986	Louis L'Amour's Down the Long Hills	Grey	TV movie
1987	The Alamo: 13 Days to Glory	"Colorado" Smith	TV movie
1987	Timestalkers	Shaving Cowboy	TV movie
1987	Starman	Driver / Stan	2 episodes
1987	Gunsmoke: Return to Dodge	Newly O'Brien	TV movie
1987	Proud Men	Homer	TV movie
1988	High Mountain Rangers	Joe Dawkins	S1:E2 "Old Friends, New Friends"
1989	Desperado: The Outlaw Wars	Wes Porter	TV movie
1989-1991	Paradise	Frank / Slatter	2 episodes
1990-1991	Dallas	Detective Bussey	6 episodes
1991	Conagher	Tile Coker, Ladder Five Rider	TV movie
1991	Knots Landing	Fred Morgan	3 episodes
1991	The Young Riders	Mr. Metcalf	S3:E5 "The Presence of Mine Enemies"
1995-1996	Walker, Texas Ranger	Logan Reno / Sheriff	2 episodes
1996	Dallas: J.R. Returns	Steve Grisham	TV movie
1997	Rough Riders	George Neville	miniseries
1998	Hard Time	Captain Adam Gunther	TV movie
1999	The Soul Collector	Charlie	TV movie
2004	The Trail to Hope Rose	Parson Brown	TV movie
2008	Comanche Moon	Ben Lily	miniseries
2016	Home on the Range	Trube Reese	TV movie
2016	Rectify	Zeke	4 episodes
2018-2022	Yellowstone	Emmett Walsh	8 episodes
