= Gunsmoke season 5 =

Gunsmoke
- Season 5
- Starring: James Arness; Dennis Weaver; Milburn Stone; Amanda Blake
- No. of episodes: 39

Release
- Original network: CBS
- Original release: September 5, 1959 – June 11, 1960

Season chronology
- ← Previous; Season 4 Next → Season 6

The fifth season of the American Western television series Gunsmoke aired in the United States between September 5, 1959, and June 11, 1960. The season consisted of 39 black-and-white 30 minute episodes. All episodes were broadcast in the US by CBS, originally airing Saturdays at 10:00-10:30 pm (EST).

Gunsmoke was developed by Charles Marquis Warren and based on the radio program of the same name. The series ran for 20 seasons, making it the longest-running Western in television history.

== Synopsis ==
Gunsmoke is set in and around Dodge City, Kansas, in the post-Civil War era and centers on United States Marshal Matt Dillon (James Arness) as he enforces law and order in the city. In its original format, the series also focuses on Dillon's friendship with three other citizens of Dodge City: Doctor Galen "Doc" Adams (Milburn Stone), the town's physician; Kitty Russell (Amanda Blake), saloon girl and later owner of the Long Branch Saloon; and Chester Goode (Dennis Weaver), Dillon's assistant.

== Cast and characters ==
=== Main ===
- James Arness as Matt Dillon
- Dennis Weaver as Chester
- Milburn Stone as Doc
- Amanda Blake as Kitty

== Production ==
Season 5 consisted of 39 half-hour black-and-white episodes produced by Norman Macdonnell. Episode 1 of the season is the first on-screen credit of James Arness as an associate producer.

Episode 15, "Tag, You're It", was the last episode to feature the beginning Boot Hill introduction.

== Episodes ==
No. overall	No. in season	Title	Directed by	Written by	Original release date	Prod. code
157	1	"Target"	Andrew V. McLaglen	Story by : Les Crutchfield; Screenplay by : John Meston	September 5, 1959	160
A love story ends tragically when a rancher attempts to drive squatting gypsies off his land.
158	2	"Kitty's Injury"	Buzz Kulik	Story by : Marian Clark; Screenplay by : John Meston	September 19, 1959	161
Kitty is injured when her horse throws her, and Matt must seek assistance from a poor prairie family whose son has distorted plans of his own.
159	3	"Horse Deal"	Andrew V. McLaglen	John Meston	September 26, 1959	159
Matt devises a plan to catch a con man who's selling stolen horses to unaware townfolk.
160	4	"Johnny Red"	Buzz Kulik	Story by : Les Crutchfield; Screenplay by : John Meston	October 3, 1959	162
A young man comes to Dodge claiming to be the long-lost son of a lonely widow, but Matt recognizes him from an old wanted poster and suspects a ruse.
161	5	"Tail to the Wind"	Christian Nyby	Story by : Les Crutchfield; Screenplay by : John Meston	October 10, 1959	166
Divine intervention intercedes when a timid homesteader and his wife are bullied off their land and refuse Matt's help.
162	6	"Annie Oakley"	Jesse Hibbs	John Meston	October 17, 1959	158
A drama-seeking woman manipulates her husband into a fight with their neighbor.
163	7	"Kangaroo"	Andrew V. McLaglen	John Meston	October 24, 1959	164
A religious zealot passes judgment and delves out his own brand of justice, and now Chester has drawn his ire.
164	8	"Saludos"	Andrew V. McLaglen	Story by : Les Crutchfield; Screenplay by : John Meston	October 31, 1959	163
Matt escorts three cowboys back to Dodge with hopes that a wounded Pawnee Indian girl can identify the one that shot her.
165	9	"Brother Whelp"	R.G. Springsteen	Story by : Les Crutchfield; Screenplay by : John Meston	November 7, 1959	169
After three years in prison, a brother returns home only to find out that his life has been turned upside down, which he blames on his younger sibling.
166	10	"The Boots"	Jesse Hibbs	John Meston	November 14, 1959	157
An ex-gunman whose life spiraled down into a bottle still has one redeemable attribute, a 12-year-old orphan that he cares deeply for.
167	11	"Odd Man Out"	Andrew V. McLaglen	Story by : Les Crutchfield; Screenplay by : John Meston	November 21, 1959	168
Something's amiss when an old farmer exhibiting odd behavior tells Matt and Chester that his wife left him.
168	12	"Miguel's Daughter"	Andrew V. McLaglen	Story by : Marian Clark; Screenplay by : John Meston	November 28, 1959	171
A father who greatly believes in family honor takes the law into his own hands when his daughter is harassed and molested by two cowboys.
169	13	"Box o' Rocks"	R.G. Springsteen	Les Crutchfield	December 5, 1959	173
Matt searches for a man who faked his own death after his coffin is found full of rocks.
170	14	"False Witness"	Ted Post	Story by : Marian Clark; Screenplay by : John Meston	December 12, 1959	179
An attention-seeking man claims he was an eyewitness to murder and then proceeds to finger an innocent cowboy.
171	15	"Tag, You're It"	Jesse Hibbs	Les Crutchfield	December 19, 1959	176
Dodge townspeople are highly agitated when a notorious gunfighter comes to town, and no one knows who he's after.
172	16	"Thick 'n' Thin"	Stuart Heisler	Story by : Les Crutchfield; Screenplay by : John Meston	December 26, 1959	165
Matt tries to keep the peace between two old bickering curmudgeons who share a homestead.
173	17	"Groat's Grudge"	Andrew V. McLaglen	Story by : Marian Clark; Screenplay by : John Meston	January 2, 1960	172
After years of searching, an ex-Confederate cavalryman has finally found the former Union officer he thinks was responsible for the death of his wife, during Sherman's March to the Sea.
174	18	"Big Tom"	Andrew V. McLaglen	Story by : Marian Clark; Screenplay by : John Meston	January 9, 1960	180
Two unscrupulous boxing promoters set up a deadly match for a washed-up local prize fighter in a winner take all contest.
175	19	"Till Death Do Us"	Jean Yarbrough	Les Crutchfield	January 16, 1960	178
An abusive and self-righteous rancher becomes the target of a hired gunman.
176	20	"The Tragedian"	Arthur Hiller	Story by : Les Crutchfield; Screenplay by : John Meston	January 23, 1960	182
An unemployed and impoverished stage actor resorts to petty crime when his world collides with a jailed murderer.
177	21	"Hinka Do"	Andrew V. McLaglen	Les Crutchfield	January 30, 1960	177
Matt, Chester and Doc try to unravel a mystery involving the missing Lady Gay Saloon owner and the brash, larger-than-life female proprietress whose taken over the establishment.
178	22	"Doc Judge"	Arthur Hiller	John Meston	February 6, 1960	183
Chester protects Doc from an escaped convict who mistakes him for the Wyoming Territory judge that sentenced him to seven years.
179	23	"Moo Moo Raid"	Andrew V. McLaglen	Story by : Les Crutchfield; Screenplay by : John Meston	February 13, 1960	167
Two trail bosses driving their herds to Dodge threaten to kill each other over the use of a local farmer's special swimming cow.
180	24	"Kitty's Killing"	Arthur Hiller	Story by : Marian Clark; Screenplay by : John Meston	February 20, 1960	186
Kitty prevents a distraught and frenzied man from killing his son-in-law, who he blames for the death of his daughter.
181	25	"Jailbait Janet"	Jesse Hibbs	Les Crutchfield	February 27, 1960	175
Matt tracks down a desperate family who robbed a train and killed the baggage clerk in retaliation for the railroad inadvertently burning down their farm.
182	26	"Unwanted Deputy"	Andrew V. McLaglen	Story by : Marian Clark; Screenplay by : John Meston	March 5, 1960	181
A convicted murderer's sibling concocts a unique plan to avenge his brother's hanging, by unofficially acting as town deputy with hopes of provoking Matt into a gunfight.
183	27	"Where'd They Go"	Jesse Hibbs	Story by : Les Crutchfield; Screenplay by : John Meston	March 12, 1960	187
Matt and Chester ride out to arrest a shrewd farmer for robbing the general store, but the silver-tongued fellow completely pulls the wool over their eyes.
184	28	"Crowbait Bob"	Andrew V. McLaglen	Les Crutchfield	March 26, 1960	191
A dying old prospector has everyone curious when he wills Kitty all of his worldly possessions, much to the dismay of his niece and her husband.
185	29	"Colleen So Green"	Jean Yarbrough	Story by : Les Crutchfield; Screenplay by : John Meston	April 2, 1960	188
A pretty Southern belle uses her beauty and native wit to charm the pants off all the single men of Dodge.
186	30	"The Ex-Urbanites"	Andrew V. McLaglen	John Meston	April 9, 1960	195
Chester takes care of a severely injured Doc when they're bushwhacked by a pair of outlaws out on the open prairie.
187	31	"I Thee Wed"	Jesse Hibbs	Story by : Les Crutchfield; Screenplay by : John Meston	April 16, 1960	184
A despicable and abusive husband keeps beating his wife and she just hopes and believes that he'll change, until he doesn't.
188	32	"The Lady Killer"	Andrew V. McLaglen	John Meston	April 23, 1960	193
Matt suspects Kitty's new saloon girl is a hired killer and when she shoots a man set to testify against a known gambler, he must connect the dots.
189	33	"Gentleman's Disagreement"	Jesse Hibbs	Les Crutchfield	April 30, 1960	189
After five years, a jealous gunman carrying a personal grudge has finally found the man who married the girl he once courted.
190	34	"Speak Me Fair"	Andrew V. McLaglen	Les Crutchfield	May 7, 1960	194
Matt has his hands full investigating two separate crimes, a Kiowa Indian boy found nearly beaten to death and cattle rustling at a nearby ranch.
191	35	"Belle's Back"	Jesse Hibbs	Les Crutchfield	May 14, 1960	185
A local girl returns to Dodge asking for a fresh start, after riding off with a notorious gunman three years ago.
192	36	"The Bobsy Twins"	Jesse Hibbs	John Meston	May 21, 1960	170
Crude hillbilly twin brothers come west to Dodge to kill Indians, and along the way their callous nature leaves a trail of violence.
193	37	"Old Flame"	Jesse Hibbs	Story by : Marian Clark; Screenplay by : John Meston	May 28, 1960	190
Matt's old girlfriend, Dolly (Marilyn Maxwell), asks him to find her (supposed) abusive husband, who she claims beat her and ran off with all her money, but Kitty suspects she has ulterior motives. Lee Van Cleef as Rad.
194	38	"The Deserter"	Arthur Hiller	Story by : Marian Clark; Screenplay by : John Meston	June 4, 1960	174
Matt acquires information that puts him on the trail of an Army corporal and his civilian partner who stole a Fort Dodge payroll.
195	39	"Cherry Red"	Andrew V. McLaglen	Les Crutchfield	June 11, 1960	192
A stagecoach special agent comes to Dodge searching for one-half of a hold-up team and falls in love with the wife of the other half, who he shot and killed.

== Release ==
=== Broadcast ===
Season five aired Saturdays at 10:00-10:30 pm (EST) on CBS.

=== Home media ===
The fifth season was released on DVD by Paramount Home Entertainment in two volumes. The first 20 episodes were released on October 11, 2011 and the remaining 19 episodes were released on December 13, 2011.

== Reception ==
Gunsmoke held the number one primetime spot in the Nielsen ratings four years straight, for the third, fourth, fifth, and sixth seasons.
