= Gunsmoke season 7 =

Gunsmoke
- Season 7
- Starring: James Arness; Dennis Weaver; Milburn Stone; Amanda Blake
- No. of episodes: 34

Release
- Original network: CBS
- Original release: September 30, 1961 – May 26, 1962

Season chronology
- ← Previous; Season 6 Next → Season 8

The seventh season of the American Western television series Gunsmoke aired in the United States beginning on September 30, 1961, and the final episode aired on May 26, 1962. The season consisted of 34 black-and-white, 60-minute episodes, all of which were broadcast in the US by CBS, originally airing Saturdays at 10:00-11:00 pm (EST).

Gunsmoke was developed by Charles Marquis Warren and based on the radio program of the same name. The series ran for 20 seasons, making it the longest-running Western in television history.

== Synopsis ==
Gunsmoke is set in and around Dodge City, Kansas, in the post-Civil War era and centers on United States Marshal Matt Dillon (James Arness) as he enforces law and order in the city. In its original format, the series also focuses on Dillon's friendship with three other citizens of Dodge City: Doctor Galen "Doc" Adams (Milburn Stone), the town's physician; Kitty Russell (Amanda Blake), saloon girl and later owner of the Long Branch Saloon; and Chester Goode (Dennis Weaver), Dillon's assistant.

== Cast and characters ==
=== Main ===
- James Arness as Matt Dillon
- Dennis Weaver as Chester
- Milburn Stone as Doc
- Amanda Blake as Kitty
- Glenn Strange as Sam Noonan

== Production ==
Season 7 consisted of 34 one-hour, black-and-white episodes produced by Norman Macdonnell with Frank Paris as associate producer.

Episode 13, "Marry Me", was the last of four episodes directed by Dennis Weaver.

== Episodes ==
No. overall	No. in season	Title	Directed by	Written by	Original release date	Prod. code
234	1	"Perce"	Harry Harris	John Meston	September 30, 1961	31004
A gunslinger saves Matt's life and becomes well-liked in Dodge, but the love of a woman leads him down the wrong trail.
235	2	"Old Yellow Boots"	Ted Post	John Meston	October 7, 1961	31005
Matt suspects one man for two different murders, an old prospector and well-to-do rancher; his only clue is an unusual boot imprint.
236	3	"Miss Kitty"	Harry Harris	Kathleen Hite	October 14, 1961	31002
Dodge's rumor mill is running full overdrive when Kitty whisks a young boy off the stagecoach and hustles him out into the country, but much to Kitty's dismay, the gossip finds the wrong ears.
237	4	"Harpe's Blood"	Andrew V. McLaglen	John Meston	October 21, 1961	31007
Bad blood runs through a family's veins and a brute of a man promises his dying wife that he will raise their two sons "hard and strict".
238	5	"All That"	Andrew V. McLaglen	John Meston	October 28, 1961	31013
A failed rancher loses everything - home, cattle, and wife, but comes up with an ingenious plan to pay back those who wronged him.
239	6	"Long, Long Trail"	Andrew V. McLaglen	Kathleen Hite	November 4, 1961	31015
Matt reluctantly agrees to escort a young woman on a treacherous journey across the prairie to Fort Wallace, Kansas; they encounter numerous perils along the way.
240	7	"The Squaw"	Gerald Mayer	John Dunkel	November 11, 1961	31008
A widowed rancher takes in an Arapaho squaw, which infuriates his son and divides the family.
241	8	"Chesterland"	Ted Post	Kathleen Hite	November 18, 1961	31006
Chester becomes engaged, and in his eagerness to please the girl, buys a run-down, abandoned homestead, where he experiences many hardships and in the end betrayal.
242	9	"Milly"	Richard Whorf	Story by : Hal Moffett; Screenplay by : John Meston	November 25, 1961	31003
The poverty-stricken daughter of a hopeless drunk believes the only way to save her brother and escape their forsaken lives is to get married.
243	10	"Indian Ford"	Andrew V. McLaglen	John Dunkel	December 2, 1961	31001
A white woman is spotted living among the Arapaho people, and Matt accompanies the Cavalry in an attempt to rescue her, but she is reluctant to being saved.
244	11	"Apprentice Doc"	Harry Harris	Kathleen Hite	December 9, 1961	31009
Doc is taken aback when he is approached by a man, who earlier was involved with a gang that kidnapped him, with an unusual request, teach me your profession.
245	12	"Nina's Revenge"	Tay Garnett	John Meston	December 16, 1961	31010
A conniving and abusive husband wants nothing more than to get his hands on his father-in-law's money and sets in motion one dark plan after another to acquire it, but his tormented wife will punctuate the ending of his crashing scheme.
246	13	"Marry Me"	Dennis Weaver	Kathleen Hite	December 23, 1961	31016
A clan of amusing hill folk kidnap Kitty with the sole purpose of her marrying the eldest son.
247	14	"A Man a Day"	Harry Harris	John Meston	December 30, 1961	31019
An outlaw gang offers Matt a bribe to leave town so they can rob the bank, and when he refuses, they threaten to kill a man a day until he leaves town.
248	15	"The Do-Badder"	Andrew V. McLaglen	John Meston	January 6, 1962	31012
A meddlesome gold prospector strikes it rich and settles down in Dodge, where he offers unfettered advice to improve local townspeople lives, but everything and everyone he touches does not turn to gold.
249	16	"Lacey"	Harry Harris	Kathleen Hite	January 13, 1962	31017
A young farm girl has a heated argument with her disapproving father concerning her boyfriend, and when pa turns up dead, she takes the blame.
250	17	"Cody's Code"	Andrew V. McLaglen	John Meston	January 20, 1962	31023
No good deed goes unpunished when a middle-aged man hides a wounded fugitive in the house that he is building for his young and pretty fiancé.
251	18	"Old Dan"	Andrew V. McLaglen	Kathleen Hite	January 27, 1962	31022
The good folks of Dodge bend over backwards to help a charming and loveable old drunk change his ways.
252	19	"Catawomper"	Harry Harris	Story by : James Favor; Screenplay by : John Meston	February 10, 1962	31020
A spoiled, overindulged young woman grows tired of the way her boyfriend treats her and proceeds to make him jealous by entertaining other suitors.
253	20	"Half Straight"	Ted Post	John Meston	February 17, 1962	31026
A hired gunman is stalking Matt, but he is sidetracked by a beautiful farm girl to whom he promises to go straight.
254	21	"He Learned About Women"	Tay Garnett	Story by : John Rosser; Screenplay by : John Meston	February 24, 1962	31014
Chester and an attractive Mexican woman escape from a band of Comancheros, but when they are recaptured, he believes that she betrayed him.
255	22	"The Gallows"	Andrew V. McLaglen	John Meston	March 3, 1962	31028
Matt is certain that the man he is taking to the gallows, who has been convicted of murder, is innocent.
256	23	"Reprisal"	Harry Harris	John Meston	March 10, 1962	31027
Matt informs a woman that he had to kill her carousing husband, and even though she did not love him, demands an eye for an eye from the marshal.
257	24	"Coventry"	Christian Nyby	John Meston	March 17, 1962	31021
An unsympathetic con man is given the silent treatment by the townspeople when he is found innocent in the murder of a beloved Dodge citizen.
258	25	"The Widow"	Ted Post	John Dunkel	March 24, 1962	31025
A desperate widow of a military officer killed in battle arrives in Dodge to retrieve his body, but her motives prove controversial.
259	26	"Durham Bull"	Harry Harris	Story by : Jack Shettlesworth; Screenplay by : John Meston	March 31, 1962	31011
A ruthless gang conspires to steal a prized Hereford breeding bull worth its weight in gold from a shrewd old Texas cattleman and his grandson.
260	27	"Wagon Girls"	Andrew V. McLaglen	John Meston	April 7, 1962	31018
Matt comes upon a wagon train full of young ladies answering an advertisement for women who want to marry rich Colorado gold miners, but the underhanded wagon master has formed his own immoral plans.
261	28	"The Dealer"	Harry Harris	Story by : Les Crutchfield; Screenplay by : John Dunkel	April 14, 1962	31029
A lovestruck cowboy pursues a faro dealer, but her feelings are not mutual, since he was the gunman who shot and killed her card-cheating father.
262	29	"The Summons"	Andrew V. McLaglen	Story by : Marian Clark; Screenplay by : Kathleen Hite	April 21, 1962	31030
An outlaw who was refused a bounty blames Matt and lures him to a nearby town in an outlandish plan to hang him.
263	30	"The Dreamers"	Andrew V. McLaglen	John Meston	April 28, 1962	31032
A wealthy, obnoxious miner passing through Dodge becomes infatuated with Kitty, and when she rebukes his advances, he sets aside his dreams and chooses to run her out of business.
264	31	"Cale"	Harry Harris	Kathleen Hite	May 5, 1962	31034
A headstrong young drifter is determined to make things right when he is wrongly suspected of being the accomplice of a horse thief.
265	32	"Chester's Indian"	Joseph Sargent	Kathleen Hite	May 12, 1962	31024
Chester shoots a runaway Indian hidden away by a young, enamored farm girl, who then pressures Chester into nursing him back to health.
266	33	"The Prisoner"	Andrew V. McLaglen	Robert E. Thompson	May 19, 1962	31033
A Fort Leavenworth prison escapee and murderer makes his way to Dodge and finds himself involved in a family's drama.
267	34	"The Boys"	Harry Harris	John Meston	May 26, 1962	31031
A snake-oil salesman and his three miscreant sons commit multiple crimes, and Matt starts a rumor with one of the boys in hopes of exposing all of them.

== Release ==
=== Broadcast ===
Season seven aired Saturdays at 10:00-11:00 pm (EST) on CBS.

=== Home media ===
The seventh season was released on DVD by Paramount Home Entertainment in two volumes. The first 17 episodes were released on December 11, 2012, and the remaining 17 episodes were released on February 5, 2013.

== Reception ==
After four straight seasons in the number-one primetime spot in the Nielsen ratings, Gunsmoke dropped to number three, being unseated by two other Westerns, Wagon Train and Bonanza.
