= Gunsmoke season 3 =

Gunsmoke
- Season 3
- Starring: James Arness; Dennis Weaver; Milburn Stone; Amanda Blake
- No. of episodes: 39

Release
- Original network: CBS
- Original release: September 14, 1957 – June 7, 1958

Season chronology
- ← Previous; Season 2 Next → Season 4

The third season of the American Western television series Gunsmoke aired in the United States between September 14, 1957 and June 7, 1958. The season consisted of 39 black-and-white 30 minute episodes. All episodes were broadcast in the U.S. by CBS, originally airing Saturdays at 10:00-10:30 pm (EST).

Gunsmoke was developed by Charles Marquis Warren and based on the radio program of the same name. The series ran for 20 seasons, making it the longest-running Western in television history.

== Synopsis ==
Gunsmoke is set in and around Dodge City, Kansas, in the post-Civil War era and centers on United States Marshal Matt Dillon (James Arness) as he enforces law and order in the city. In its original format, the series also focuses on Dillon's friendship with three other citizens of Dodge City: Doctor Galen "Doc" Adams (Milburn Stone), the town's physician; Kitty Russell (Amanda Blake), saloon girl and later owner of the Long Branch Saloon; and Chester Goode (Dennis Weaver), Dillon's assistant.

== Cast and characters ==
=== Main ===
- James Arness as Matt Dillon
- Dennis Weaver as Chester
- Milburn Stone as Doc
- Amanda Blake as Kitty

== Production ==
Season 3 consisted of 39 half-hour black-and-white episodes produced by Norman Macdonnell.

The fight scene near the end of episode 18, "Buffalo Man", served as the basis for an educational film produced by the American Cinema Editors, called Film Editing: Interpretation & Values, used by film students all around the world.

== Episodes ==
| No. overall | No. in season | Title | Directed by | Written by | Original release date | Prod. code |
|---|---|---|---|---|---|---|
| 79 | 1 | "Crack-Up" | Ted Post | John Meston | September 14, 1957 | 585 |
Matt believes a hired gunman with a steel-nerved reputation has lost his confidence when he begins to act tense and anxious, which makes him even more dangerous.
| 80 | 2 | "Gun for Chester" | Louis King | John Meston | September 21, 1957 | 579 |
Chester recognizes a man that just rode into town as someone he knew back in Missouri and tells Matt that he's here to kill him.
| 81 | 3 | "Blood Money" | Louis King | John Meston | September 28, 1957 | 580 |
When an ungrateful curmudgeon learns that the cowboy who saved his life is wanted, he kills him for the reward and faces the backlash of Dodge's citizens.
| 82 | 4 | "Kitty's Outlaw" | Andrew V. McLaglen | Story by : John Meston; Screenplay by : Kathleen Hite | October 5, 1957 | 582 |
Kitty's old boyfriend, Cole Yankton comes to town to rob the bank.
| 83 | 5 | "Potato Road" | Ted Post | John Meston | October 12, 1957 | 586 |
An impoverished and desperate prairie family lures Matt and Chester out of town with a tale of murder.
| 84 | 6 | "Jesse" | Andrew V. McLaglen | John Meston | October 19, 1957 | 581 |
A young man comes to town seeking his father's unknown killer so he can avenge his death.
| 85 | 7 | "Mavis McCloud" | Buzz Kulik | Story by : John Meston; Screenplay by : Kathleen Hite | October 26, 1957 | 584 |
A beautiful young lady fresh from the east comes to Dodge to get married but falls prey to frontier violence.
| 86 | 8 | "Born to Hang" | Buzz Kulik | John Meston | November 2, 1957 | 583 |
An innocent drifter saved from lynching at the hands of two unrelenting ranchers is fixed on revenge.
| 87 | 9 | "Romeo" | Ted Post | John Meston | November 9, 1957 | 588 |
Inspired by the play Romeo and Juliet, the children of feuding family patriarchs fall in love.
| 88 | 10 | "Never Pester Chester" | Richard Whorf | John Meston | November 16, 1957 | 590 |
Matt hunts down two drifters who dragged Chester behind their horses and left him for dead.
| 89 | 11 | "Fingered" | James Sheldon | John Meston | November 23, 1957 | 589 |
An irritating townsman is suspicious of a rancher when his second wife vanishes just like his first.
| 90 | 12 | "How to Kill a Woman" | John Rich | Story by : John Meston; Screenplay by : David S. Peckinpah^{[A]} | November 30, 1957 | 591 |
Matt and Chester keep a close watch at a stage stop for a ruthless killer who is murdering stagecoach passengers in cold blood.
| 91 | 13 | "Cows and Cribs" | Richard Whorf | Story by : John Meston; Screenplay by : Kathleen Hite | December 7, 1957 | 592 |
A conscientious woman's plan to adopt a baby is jeopardized when Matt discovers her shiftless husband is involved in cattle rustling.
| 92 | 14 | "Doc's Reward" | Richard Whorf | John Meston | December 14, 1957 | 593 |
A guilt-ridden Doc kills an obstinate man who prevents him from providing aid to a badly injured patient and then teaches the dead man's revenge-seeking brother a lesson in civility.
| 93 | 15 | "Kitty Lost" | Ted Post | John Meston | December 21, 1957 | 404 |
Kitty is abandoned on the open prairie by an Eastern suitor.
| 94 | 16 | "Twelfth Night" | John Rich | John Meston | December 28, 1957 | 403 |
Matt gets caught in the middle of an Ozark-mountain family feud when the two remaining survivors come to Dodge City.
| 95 | 17 | "Joe Phy" | Ted Post | John Meston | January 4, 1958 | 402 |
When Matt and Chester track a killer to the small town of Elkader, they come upon a fraudulent U.S. Marshal who interferes with their investigation.
| 96 | 18 | "Buffalo Man" | Ted Post | Story by : John Meston; Screenplay by : Les Crutchfield | January 11, 1958 | 594 |
Matt and Chester ride out to a buffalo hunter's camp to investigate the death of a man Doc found earlier.
| 97 | 19 | "Kitty Caught" | Richard Whorf | John Meston | January 18, 1958 | 595 |
Kitty is taken hostage during a bank robbery by the Gunther brothers, and they warn Matt that if he follows, they will kill her.
| 98 | 20 | "Claustrophobia" | Ted Post | John Meston | January 25, 1958 | 596 |
Two cowboys employ unscrupulous methods to steal land from an elderly man, and when he retaliates Matt arrests him, but his fear of the tight confinement of jail creates a moral dilemma.
| 99 | 21 | "Ma Tennis" | Buzz Kulik | John Meston | February 1, 1958 | 598 |
A strong-willed woman frees her son from Matt's custody, but the Marshal is determined to bring him to justice.
| 100 | 22 | "Sunday Supplement" | Richard Whorf | John Meston | February 8, 1958 | 599 |
Two writers from New York come to Dodge looking for fascinating Western stories and when they don't find anything worth reporting, they create their own, one of which unwittingly causes an Indian uprising.
| 101 | 23 | "Wild West" | Richard Whorf | John Meston | February 15, 1958 | 597 |
A rancher's younger wife conspires with two men to kidnap her elderly husband and stake him out in the open prairie in an elaborate plan to steal his ranch.
| 102 | 24 | "The Cabin" | John Rich | John Meston | February 22, 1958 | 417 |
Matt seeks shelter from a blizzard in a cabin and encounters two psychopathic criminals who murdered the owner and enslaved and abused his daughter.
| 103 | 25 | "Dirt" | Ted Post | Story by : John Meston; Screenplay by : David S. Peckinpah^{[A]} | March 1, 1958 | 400 |
Matt investigates who shot a newlywed man just moments after his wedding.
| 104 | 26 | "Dooley Surrenders" | John Rich | John Meston | March 8, 1958 | 401 |
Matt sets out to clear a buffalo skinner, who was accused by his boss of murdering one of his hunting companions.
| 105 | 27 | "Joke's on Us" | Ted Post | John Meston | March 15, 1958 | 406 |
A man suspected of horse theft is hanged, but within minutes the perpetrators find out that he was innocent.
| 106 | 28 | "Bottleman" | John Rich | John Meston | March 22, 1958 | 413 |
For reasons only known to him, the town drunk attacks the new Faro dealer who just arrived in Dodge.
| 107 | 29 | "Laughing Gas" | Ted Post | James Fonda | March 29, 1958 | 414 |
The town bully is humiliated in a traveling show and seeks retribution.
| 108 | 30 | "Texas Cowboys" | John Rich | John Meston | April 5, 1958 | 407 |
A Texas trail boss is determined to prevent Matt from learning which one of his men is responsible for murder.
| 109 | 31 | "Amy's Good Deed" | John Rich | Story by : John Meston; Screenplay by : Kathleen Hite | April 12, 1958 | 411 |
A bitter old woman comes to Dodge to die and tells Matt, "You're going to kill me".
| 110 | 32 | "Hanging Man" | John Rich | John Meston | April 19, 1958 | 415 |
Dodge merchants are committing suicide but Matt suspects something more nefarious.
| 111 | 33 | "Innocent Broad" | John Rich | Story by : John Meston; Screenplay by : Kathleen Hite | April 26, 1958 | 405 |
Matt attempts to save a young girl from making some bad decisions but her boyfriend causes trouble for all of them.
| 112 | 34 | "The Big Con" | John Rich | John Meston | May 3, 1958 | 409 |
Matt investigates three con artists who defraud the bank, but they flee taking Doc hostage.
| 113 | 35 | "Widow's Mite" | Ted Post | John Meston | May 10, 1958 | 408 |
Matt is suspicious of the intentions of a gentleman gambler, especially after he proposes to a recently widowed woman.
| 114 | 36 | "Chester's Hanging" | Ted Post | John Meston | May 17, 1958 | 412 |
Matt jails a wanted murderer, and his partner trying to avoid punishment attempts to break him out before the Marshal learns that he's also involved.
| 115 | 37 | "Carmen" | Ted Post | John Meston | May 24, 1958 | 410 |
An Army major threatens to put Dodge under martial law after soldiers transporting the Fort's payroll are killed in a robbery.
| 116 | 38 | "Overland Express" | Seymour Berns | John Meston | May 31, 1958 | 587 |
An outlaw masquerading as a passenger has plans to hold up a stagecoach full of riders including Matt and his prisoner.
| 117 | 39 | "The Gentleman" | Ted Post | John Meston | June 7, 1958 | 416 |
A charming and debonair gambler comes to Dodge and puts himself smack in the middle of a torrid relationship.

== Release ==
=== Broadcast ===
Season three aired Saturdays at 10:00-10:30 pm (EST) on CBS.

=== Home media ===
The third season was released on DVD by Paramount Home Entertainment in two volumes. The first 19 episodes were released on December 9, 2008 and the remaining 20 episodes were released on May 26, 2009.

== Reception ==
Gunsmoke held the number one primetime spot in the Nielsen ratings four years straight, for the third, fourth, fifth, and sixth seasons.

=== Awards and nominations ===
| Award | Year (Note: Indicates the year of ceremony.) | Category | Nominee(s) / Work | Result | Ref(s) |
|---|---|---|---|---|---|
| Primetime Emmy Awards | 1958 | Best Continuing Performance by an Actor in a Leading Role in a Dramatic or Comedy Series | James Arness | Nominated | |
| Primetime Emmy Awards | 1958 | Best Continuing Supporting Performance by an Actor in a Dramatic or Comedy Series | Dennis Weaver | Nominated | |
| Primetime Emmy Awards | 1958 | Best Dramatic Series with Continuing Characters | Gunsmoke | Won | |
| Primetime Emmy Awards | 1958 | Best Editing of a Film for Television | Mike Pozen for "How to Kill a Woman" | Won | |
| Primetime Emmy Awards | 1958 | Best Teleplay Writing (Half-Hour or Less) | John Meston for "Born to Hang" | Nominated | |
