= Gunsmoke season 6 =

Gunsmoke
- Season 6
- Starring: James Arness; Dennis Weaver; Milburn Stone; Amanda Blake
- No. of episodes: 38

Release
- Original network: CBS
- Original release: September 3, 1960 – June 17, 1961

Season chronology
- ← Previous; Season 5 Next → Season 7

The sixth season of the American Western television series Gunsmoke aired in the United States beginning on September 3, 1960, and the final episode aired on June 17, 1961. The season consisted of 38 black-and-white 30 minute episodes. All episodes were broadcast in the US by CBS, originally airing Saturdays at 10:00-10:30 pm (EST).

Gunsmoke was developed by Charles Marquis Warren and based on the radio program of the same name. The series ran for 20 seasons, making it the longest-running Western in television history.

== Synopsis ==
Gunsmoke is set in and around Dodge City, Kansas, in the post-Civil War era and centers on United States Marshal Matt Dillon (James Arness) as he enforces law and order in the city. In its original format, the series also focuses on Dillon's friendship with three other citizens of Dodge City: Doctor Galen "Doc" Adams (Milburn Stone), the town's physician; Kitty Russell (Amanda Blake), saloon girl and later owner of the Long Branch Saloon; and Chester Goode (Dennis Weaver), Dillon's assistant.

== Cast and characters ==
=== Main ===
- James Arness as Matt Dillon
- Dennis Weaver as Chester
- Milburn Stone as Doc
- Amanda Blake as Kitty

== Production ==
Season 6 consisted of 38 half-hour black-and-white episodes produced by Norman Macdonnell.

=== Writing ===
Occasionally, titles were re-used. Season six had three such episodes: episode 7, "The Squaw" was also the title of season 20, episode 14; episode 23, "Reprisal" was also the title of season 14, episode 20, and episode 33, "The Prisoner" was also the title of season 14, episode 25.

== Episodes ==
No. overall	No. in season	Title	Directed by	Written by	Original release date	Prod. code
196	1	"Friend's Pay-Off"	Jesse Hibbs	Story by : Marian Clark; Screenplay by : John Meston	September 3, 1960	201
Matt shoots and kills the outlaw who wounded his old friend on the road to Dodge, but the assailant's dying words will alter the Marshal's friendship.
197	2	"The Blacksmith"	Andrew V. McLaglen	Story by : Norman MacDonnell; Screenplay by : John Meston	September 17, 1960	206
An immigrant blacksmith faces the backlash from a disgruntled rancher when he refuses to sell his land.
198	3	"Small Water"	Andrew V. McLaglen	John Meston	September 24, 1960	207
Despite his claims of innocence, Matt arrests a family patriarch and escorts him to Dodge, but his sons give chase and methodically cut off the Marshal's escape.
199	4	"Say Uncle"	Andrew V. McLaglen	John Meston	October 1, 1960	197
A young man suspects his recently arrived uncle of murder when his father dies in a freak accident.
200	5	"Shooting Stopover"	Andrew V. McLaglen	Story by : Marian Clark; Screenplay by : John Meston	October 8, 1960	202
Matt and Chester transport a prisoner to Wichita by stagecoach and are forced to take a stand at the stage's stopover when they're set upon by bandits.
201	6	"The Peace Officer"	Jesse Hibbs	Story by : Norman MacDonnell; Screenplay by : John Meston	October 15, 1960	205
Matt relives Tascosa's Sheriff of duty after a complaint of corruption, and in return he sends his henchmen to intercept the Marshal while making a veiled threat, "there's a lot of prairie between here and Dodge".
202	7	"Don Matteo"	Jesse Hibbs	Story by : Marian Clark; Screenplay by : John Meston	October 22, 1960	200
A Mexican rancher, Matt's friend from his Texas border days, arrives in Dodge hunting the ill-tempered gunman that dishonored his family and the Marshal warns him to not take the law into his own hands.
203	8	"The Worm"	Arthur Hiller	John Meston	October 29, 1960	203
A crude buffalo hunter and his bullied lackey come to Dodge to sell their hides and encounter ridicule and discrimination.
204	9	"The Badge"	Andrew V. McLaglen	Story by : Marian Clark; Screenplay by : John Meston	November 12, 1960	196
Matt is ambushed and held hostage by two bank robbers who desperately need a horse, but it's his badge that proves pivotal.
205	10	"Distant Drummer"	Arthur Hiller	Story by : Marian Clark; Screenplay by : John Meston	November 19, 1960	209
A naive Civil War drummer boy is harassed and badgered by a couple of Dodge City locals and then jailed when one of the tormentors turns up dead.
206	11	"Ben Tolliver's Stud"	Andrew V. McLaglen	Story by : Norman MacDonnell; Screenplay by : John Meston	November 26, 1960	199
A brash ranch hand quits his job over disagreements with his boss and appropriates the horse he caught and broke, but the rancher claims ownership of the steed and accuses him of theft.
207	12	"No Chip"	Jean Yarbrough	John Meston	December 3, 1960	212
Neighboring ranchers spar over cattle grazing rights which escalates into an all-out war where one elderly rancher must confront three lawless brothers alone.
208	13	"The Wake"	Gerald Mayer	John Meston	December 10, 1960	210
A bold and daring man brings his dearly departed best friend into Dodge for a proper burial and the madcap wake that comes with it.
209	14	"The Cook"	Ted Post	John Meston	December 17, 1960	216
A drifter becomes extremely popular when he pays off his debt by cooking at Delmonico's, but an altercation with a customer leads to murder.
210	15	"Old Fool"	Ted Post	John Meston	December 24, 1960	211
A married farmer is attracted to a widowed temptress who steadily lures him in, but his strong-willed wife ends up teaching both a lesson.
211	16	"Brother Love"	Franklin Adreon	John Meston	December 31, 1960	208
Matt investigates a robbery and murder at Jonas' general store and what results is an unexpected family tragedy.
212	17	"Bad Sheriff"	Andrew V. McLaglen	John Meston	January 7, 1961	198
Matt is suspicious of an opportunistic sheriff and his deputy who caught a stagecoach robber with a saddlebag full of money.
213	18	"Unloaded Gun"	Jesse Hibbs	Story by : Marian Clark; Screenplay by : John Meston	January 14, 1961	204
Matt becomes quite ill suffering from fever and exhaustion when a cold-blooded killer comes to town and in his daze, he confronts the outlaw totally unaware that Chester has cleaned and unloaded his gun.
214	19	"Tall Trapper"	Harry Harris Jr.	Story by : Marian Clark; Screenplay by : John Meston	January 21, 1961	220
A Georgia couple traveling by wagon share a camp outside of Dodge with a trapper and the next morning the husband begs Doc to come out and treat his ailing wife, but what he finds is far more distressing.
215	20	"Love Thy Neighbor"	Dennis Weaver	John Meston	January 28, 1961	214
A misunderstanding over a stolen sack of potatoes leads to a deadly feud between two homestead families.
216	21	"Bad Seed"	Harry Harris	Story by : Norman MacDonnell; Screenplay by : John Meston	February 4, 1961	222
Matt saves a runaway teenage girl from her abusive father, but she creates further difficulties for the Marshal.
217	22	"Kitty Shot"	Andrew V. McLaglen	John Meston	February 11, 1961	215
Kitty is caught in the crossfire during a bar room brawl and Matt trails the shooter out on the open range, but little does he know, a mysterious rider is tracking him.
218	23	"About Chester"	Alan Crosland Jr.	Story by : Frank Paris; Screenplay by : John Meston	February 25, 1961	221
Chester fights for his life when he's held captive by an irrational off-balanced horse thief and his abused common-law wife.
219	24	"Harriet"	Gene Fowler Jr.	John Meston	March 4, 1961	217
Matt inadvertently gives away a young woman's daring cat-and-mouse plan of revenge against the two men that murdered her father.
220	25	"Potshot"	Harry Harris	John Meston	March 11, 1961	230
Chester is shot and wounded which coincides with the arrival of a strange old man, who thoroughly enjoys stirring up a little mischief.
221	26	"Old Faces"	Harry Harris	John Meston	March 18, 1961	229
A young married couple come to Dodge to settle down, but the bride's past quickly catches up to both of them.
222	27	"Big Man"	Gerald Mayer	John Meston	March 25, 1961	233
A belligerent man who made unwanted advances on Kitty is found beaten to death and an eyewitness comes forward claiming Matt did it.
223	28	"Little Girl"	Dennis Weaver	Story by : Kathleen Hite; Screenplay by : John Meston	April 1, 1961	224
Matt and Chester come upon a burnt homestead and are surprised by a ten-year-old girl emerging from the brush who attaches herself to the Marshal.
224	29	"Stolen Horses"	Andrew V. McLaglen	Story by : Norman MacDonnell; Screenplay by : John Meston	April 8, 1961	219
Matt and Chester track down a murderer and horse thief into Indian territory.
225	30	"Minnie"	Harry Harris	John Meston	April 15, 1961	228
A wounded female buffalo skinner seeking medical attention flaunts all her womanly charms when she becomes enamored with Doc.
226	31	"Bless Me Till I Die"	Ted Post	Story by : Ray Kemper; Screenplay by : John Meston	April 22, 1961	231
The town's diminutive loudmouth bully has a beef with a newly arrived couple and recognizes the husband who's hiding his checkered past.
227	32	"Long Hours, Short Pay"	Andrew V. McLaglen	John Meston	April 29, 1961	218
Matt captures a gunrunner trading rifles with the Pawnees and in turn is captured himself.
228	33	"Hard Virtue"	Dennis Weaver	John Meston	May 6, 1961	223
A freight line owner has an accident with a down-and-out young couple and offers the husband a job, but it's his wife that he's more interested in.
229	34	"The Imposter"	Byron Paul	Story by : Kathleen Hite; Screenplay by : John Meston	May 13, 1961	225
A Sheriff from Miami, Texas comes to Dodge looking for a bank robber and murderer, but Matt soon learns that he's not what he seems.
230	35	"Chester's Dilemma"	Ted Post	Story by : Vic Perrin; Screenplay by : John Meston	May 20, 1961	232
Chester becomes infatuated with a runaway girl from Ohio who exploits his position as Marshal's assistant to hide her secret.
231	36	"The Love of Money"	Ted Post	John Meston	May 27, 1961	227
Matt's friend, a retired U.S. Marshal from Oklahoma territory is shot in the back and his murder may go unsolved, but when a $500 information reward is offered, greed and betrayal take over.
232	37	"Melinda Miles"	William D. Faralla	John Meston	June 3, 1961	226
A rancher's daughter alibi's her boyfriend, who's suspected of killing her father's right-hand man leaving Matt to solve the mystery.
233	38	"Colorado Sheriff"	Jesse Hibbs	John Meston	June 17, 1961	213
A Colorado Sheriff is insistent in arresting the wounded man Matt and Chester found out on the open prairie, but without an arrest warrant, the Marshal suspects that he's being untruthful.

== Release ==
=== Broadcast ===
Season six aired Saturdays at 10:00-10:30 pm (EST) on CBS.

=== Home media ===
The sixth season was released on DVD by Paramount Home Entertainment in two volumes. 19 episodes were released on August 7, 2012 and 19 episodes were released on October 16, 2012.

== Reception ==
Gunsmoke held the number one primetime spot in the Nielsen ratings four years straight, for the third, fourth, fifth, and sixth seasons.
