= Gunsmoke season 2 =

Gunsmoke
- Season 2
- Starring: James Arness; Dennis Weaver; Milburn Stone; Amanda Blake
- No. of episodes: 39

Release
- Original network: CBS
- Original release: September 8, 1956 – June 29, 1957

Season chronology
- ← Previous; Season 1 Next → Season 3

The second season of the American Western television series Gunsmoke aired in the United States between September 8, 1956 and June 29, 1957. The season consisted of 39 black-and-white 30 minute episodes. All episodes were broadcast in the U.S. by CBS, originally airing Saturdays at 10:00-10:30 pm (EST).

Gunsmoke was developed by Charles Marquis Warren and based on the radio program of the same name. The series ran for 20 seasons, making it the longest-running Western in television history.

== Synopsis ==
Gunsmoke is set in and around Dodge City, Kansas, in the post-Civil War era and centers on United States Marshal Matt Dillon (James Arness) as he enforces law and order in the city. In its original format, the series also focuses on Dillon's friendship with three other citizens of Dodge City: Doctor Galen "Doc" Adams (Milburn Stone), the town's physician; Kitty Russell (Amanda Blake), saloon girl and later owner of the Long Branch Saloon; and Chester Goode (Dennis Weaver), Dillon's assistant.

== Cast and characters ==
=== Main ===
- James Arness as Matt Dillon
- Dennis Weaver as Chester
- Milburn Stone as Doc
- Amanda Blake as Kitty

== Production ==
Season 2 was produced by Charles Marquis Warren (episodes 40–49, 51–52, 57) and Norman Macdonnell (episodes 50, 53–56, 58–78).

The first episode of season 2 was directed by Andrew V. McLaglen, who directed 96 episodes during the series run, more than any other director.

=== Writing ===
Storylines would occasionally be taken from real-life events. Episode 4 of the season, "The Round Up" reflects an actual event that happened when Wild Bill Hickok accidentally shot his deputy Mike Williams.

Occasionally, the episode titles reflected verses or passages from the Bible. The title of episode 10, "Greater Love" is a reference to John 15:13 and is delivered by Doc in the final scene, "Greater love hath no man than this, that a man lay down his life for his friends." The title of episode 34, "Who Lives by the Sword" is a proverb derived from Matthew 26:52, "Then said Jesus unto him, 'Put up again thy sword into his place: for all they that take the sword shall perish with the sword.'" Some titles were plays on words, such as episode 37, "The Man Who Would Be Marshal", which is a play on words of the short story The Man Who Would Be King by Rudyard Kipling but is not based on it.

=== Production design ===
Sometimes, set pieces were reused. For example, the hotel in episode 2, "Brush at Elkader", is the Dodge House. The reception desk is repositioned, but the staircase leading to the upstairs rooms has the same unusual Swiss chalet-style wooden balusters that are found in the Dodge House.

=== Music ===
The melody playing at the end of the episode is the Irish air Garryowen, it was the marching tune for General George Armstrong Custer's 7th Cavalry Regiment.

== Episodes ==
No. overall	No. in season	Title	Directed by	Written by	Original release date	Prod. code
40	1	"Cow Doctor"	Andrew V. McLaglen	Story by : John Meston; Screenplay by : John Dunkel	September 8, 1956	541
Doc is called out to a farm for a medical emergency under false pretenses and becomes involved in an altercation.
41	2	"Brush at Elkader"	Ted Post	Story by : John Meston; Screenplay by : Les Crutchfield	September 15, 1956	542
Matt and Chester track a killer that they know by name only to the small town of Elkader, where the people out of fear refuse to cooperate.
42	3	"Custer"	Ted Post	Story by : John Meston; Screenplay by : Gil Doud	September 22, 1956	540
An overconfident Army deserter callously breaks the law and strongly believes there will be no repercussions, but soon his fate will be sealed.
43	4	"The Round Up"	Ted Post	Story by : John Meston; Screenplay by : Sam Peckinpah	September 29, 1956	544
Matt refuses Dodge City merchant's request to hire more deputies to protect their interests during a round-up which lead to threats and danger for the Marshal.
44	5	"Young Man with a Gun"	Christian Nyby	Story by : John Meston; Screenplay by : Winston Miller	October 20, 1956	545
Matt shoots and kills an arrogant gunfighter pursuing a reputation and now the gunman's inexperienced teen-aged brother comes to Dodge seeking revenge.
45	6	"Indian White"	Ted Post	Story by : Tom Hanley; Screenplay by : David Victor and Herbert Little, Jr.	October 27, 1956	546
A twelve-year-old white boy must make a life decision, stay with the woman who claims he's her son or return to the Cheyenne Indians that raised him.
46	7	"How to Cure a Friend"	Ted Post	Story by : John Meston; Screenplay by : Winston Miller	November 10, 1956	550
Townspeople tongues wag when they find out that Matt has vouched for his friend, a known gambler and gunman, to set-up shop in the Long Branch.
47	8	"Legal Revenge"	Andrew V. McLaglen	Story by : John Meston; Screenplay by : Sam Peckinpah	November 17, 1956	547
Doc suspects the wife of knifing her husband after he treats his badly infected leg and urges Matt to investigate when the man brandishes a gun.
48	9	"The Mistake"	Andrew V. McLaglen	Story by : John Meston; Screenplay by : Gil Doud	November 24, 1956	543
A troublesome man suspected of murder proclaims his innocence but needs Doc, who's out of town to establish his alibi.
49	10	"Greater Love"	Ted Post	Story by : John Meston; Screenplay by : Winston Miller	December 1, 1956	548
Matt risks his own life when an outlaw takes Doc hostage and threatens to kill him if he does not help his wounded partner.
50	11	"No Indians"	Ted Post	Story by : John Meston; Screenplay by : John Dunkel	December 8, 1956	554
Dodge settlers are leaving after a rash of Pawnee Indian raids and when Matt investigates, he concludes it's something more shocking.
51	12	"Spring Term"	Ted Post	Story by : John Meston; Screenplay by : William F. Leicester	December 15, 1956	552
A man from Matt's past seeks revenge for the hanging of his partner and has hired a gunman to kill him, but the shooter makes a grave mistake.
52	13	"Poor Pearl"	Andrew V. McLaglen	Story by : John Meston; Screenplay by : Sam Peckinpah	December 22, 1956	551
A love triangle ends in unimaginable violence when two men court the same girl.
53	14	"Cholera"	Andrew V. McLaglen	Story by : John Meston; Screenplay by : Les Crutchfield	December 29, 1956	553
A recent outbreak of cholera is used as a weapon of revenge when a rancher terrorizes homesteaders off their land.
54	15	"Pucket's New Year"	Andrew V. McLaglen	John Meston	January 5, 1957	555
Matt and Chester rescue an old buffalo hunter who was abandoned and left for dead in the freezing cold temperatures on the prairie.
55	16	"The Cover Up"	William D. Russell	Story by : John Meston; Screenplay by : William N. Robson	January 12, 1957	558
Matt arrests an abusive rancher who killed two squatters on his land, and after he's jailed his guilt comes into question when a third nester is murdered.
56	17	"Sins of the Father"	Andrew V. McLaglen	Story by : John Meston; Screenplay by : John Dunkel	January 19, 1957	557
A large imposing mountain man and his Arapahoe Indian wife, whose father led raids on the local settlers face untold prejudice at the hands of Dodge townsfolk, but it's her strength and resilience that overcome the intolerance.
57	18	"Kick Me"	Andrew V. McLaglen	Story by : John Meston; Screenplay by : Endre Bohem and Louis Vittes	January 26, 1957	549
A Kiowa Indian guide delivers his revenge by stalking the merciless outlaw that humiliated and dishonored him.
58	19	"Executioner"	Andrew V. McLaglen	Story by : John Meston; Screenplay by : Gil Doud	February 2, 1957	559
A vicious gunfighter brazenly kills an over-matched rancher, now the rancher's grief-stricken brother formulates a life-threatening plan to force Matt to settle the score.
59	20	"Gone Straight"	Ted Post	Story by : John Meston; Screenplay by : Les Crutchfield	February 9, 1957	562
Matt is given the unpleasant task of serving a warrant on an ex-member of Billy the Kid's gang in the small town of Tascosa, Texas but problems arise when three men living completely normal lives fit the limited description supplied to him.
60	21	"Bloody Hands"	Andrew V. McLaglen	John Meston	February 16, 1957	561
Matt guns down three bank robbers in a fierce gunfight, and when the surviving member of the gang calls him a "butcher" it sends him into an emotional tailspin.
61	22	"Skid Row"	Ted Post	Story by : John Meston; Screenplay by : Gil Doud	February 23, 1957	564
A young woman comes to Dodge in search of her fiancé who has become the town drunk after failing to prosper on his homestead.
62	23	"Sweet and Sour"	Andrew V. McLaglen	John Meston	March 2, 1957	569
Kitty warns Matt that the new girl in town is nothing but trouble, and her intuition proves correct when the flirtatious young lady manipulates her ardent admirers into facing off against each other in gunfights.
63	24	"Cain"	Ted Post	John Meston	March 9, 1957	566
A kind and charismatic stranger dying of heart failure stops in Dodge on his way to see the Arizona desert, but his demeanor changes drastically when a man from his past steps into the Long Branch.
64	25	"Bureaucrat"	Ted Post	Story by : John Meston; Teleplay by : William F. Leicester	March 16, 1957	570
Matt's superior, a government official from Washington comes to Dodge to observe the Marshal's job performance and doesn't like what he sees.
65	26	"Last Fling"	Andrew V. McLaglen	John Meston	March 23, 1957	571
A cruel and verbally abusive farmer abandons his wife and heads to Dodge with his friend for one last fling, to drink his life savings away, but it's his determined spouse that will have the last word.
66	27	"Chester's Murder"	Ted Post	John Meston	March 30, 1957	568
The townspeople of Dodge suspect Chester of committing murder after he's knocked unconscious, and the belligerent drunkard he was escorting to jail is found shot to death lying next to him.
67	28	"The Photographer"	William D. Russell	John Dunkel	April 6, 1957	556
An arrogant photographer creates quite a stir in Dodge with his newfangled picture box, but his attempts to acquire sensational photographs are reprehensible which cause serious turmoil.
68	29	"Wrong Man"	Andrew V. McLaglen	John Meston	April 13, 1957	563
A miserable and cowardly homesteader mistakes a passer-by for a wanted outlaw and shoots him in the back to claim the $1,000 reward, but when he's told that he shot the wrong man he feverishly coerces his abused wife to verify his alibi.
69	30	"Big Girl Lost"	Ted Post	John Meston	April 20, 1957	560
A pompous well-to-do gentleman from Philadelphia comes to Dodge in search of his runaway fiancé whose family dismissed for being a ship captain's daughter.
70	31	"What the Whiskey Drummer Heard"	Andrew V. McLaglen	Story by : John Meston; Teleplay by : Gil Doud	April 27, 1957	572
An odd whiskey salesman has valuable information for Matt, that he overheard a conversation between two men putting a $300 bounty on his head.
71	32	"Cheap Labor"	Andrew V. McLaglen	John Meston	May 4, 1957	567
An overbearing brother badgers and mistreats his sister, dominating her life and regarding her only as hired help which creates animosity when a new stranger in town shows her interest.
72	33	"Moon"	William D. Russell	John Meston	May 11, 1957	575
A crooked card dealer resorts to desperate measures to recover his gambling losses.
73	34	"Who Lives by the Sword"	Andrew V. McLaglen	John Meston	May 18, 1957	573
A loathsome gunslinger shoots and kills two of Dodge's beloved brothers and Matt's immediate emotional backlash sends the gunman reeling into despair.
74	35	"Uncle Oliver"	Andrew V. McLaglen	John Meston	May 25, 1957	574
An old codger brings his simpleton nephew to town and decides that he would be a good fit for Matt's assistant but when Chester gets ambushed, the big galoot can't be found, making him a questionable suspect.
75	36	"Daddy-O"	Andrew V. McLaglen	John Meston	June 1, 1957	565
Kitty is elated at first to finally meet her father, who abandoned her when she was born, but she grows increasingly cautious over his overbearing intentions.
76	37	"The Man Who Would Be Marshal"	William D. Russell	Story by : John Meston; Screenplay by : David Victor and Herbert Little, Jr.	June 15, 1957	577
A retired Army officer who has been approved for the job of marshal by the War Department, approaches Matt with an unusual request, "Quit, I want to be Marshal".
77	38	"Liar from Blackhawk"	Andrew V. McLaglen	John Meston	June 22, 1957	576
A newcomer in town craves respect and uses a pawn to pump-up his fake reputation as a gunman.
78	39	"Jealousy"	Andrew V. McLaglen	Story by : John Meston; Screenplay by : Sam Peckinpah	June 29, 1957	578
An injured card dealer spurned by Matt wants revenge and starts spreading rumors that the Marshal is courting his old friend's wife.

== Release ==
=== Broadcast ===
Season two aired Saturdays at 10:00-10:30 pm (EST) on CBS.

=== Home media ===
The second season was released on DVD by Paramount Home Entertainment in two volumes. The first 20 episodes were released on January 8, 2008, and the remaining 19 episodes were released on May 27, 2008.

(In the Season 2, Volume 1 set, the seventh episode of Season 2, "How to Cure a Friend", was mistakenly replaced by the similarly-titled "How to Kill a Friend", which was the eleventh episode of Season 4. To make up for this error, "How to Cure a Friend" was included as an extra on Disc 3 of the Season 4, Volume 1 set.)

== Reception ==
After failing to finish in the Nielsen ratings top 30 in its first season, Gunsmoke finished season 2 at number 8, the highest rated Western for the season.

=== Awards and nominations ===
Award	Year (Note: Indicates the year of ceremony.)	Category	Nominee(s) / Work	Result	Ref(s)
Primetime Emmy Awards	1957	Best Continuing Performance by an Actor in a Dramatic Series	James Arness	Nominated	
