= Letter of the Law =

The letter of the law refers to following laws or rules precisely as written, without interpretation.

Letter of the Law may also refer to:

- "The Letter of the Law", 1936 short story by P. G. Wodehouse
- Takeru: Letter of the Law, 1996 manga series by Buichi Terasawa
- "Letter of the Law" (Gunsmoke), American Western television series Gunsmoke episode
- "Letter of the Law" (The Lone Ranger), American Western television series The Lone Ranger episode
- "Letter of the Law" (The Rifleman), American Western television series The Rifleman episode
- "Letter of the Law" (The Virginian), American Western television series The Virginian episode

== See also ==
- Black letter law
