= Gunsmoke season 4 =

Gunsmoke
- Season 4
- Starring: James Arness; Dennis Weaver; Milburn Stone; Amanda Blake
- No. of episodes: 39

Release
- Original network: CBS
- Original release: September 13, 1958 – June 13, 1959

Season chronology
- ← Previous; Season 3 Next → Season 5

The fourth season of the American Western television series Gunsmoke aired in the United States between September 13, 1958 and June 13, 1959. The season consisted of 39 black-and-white 30 minute episodes. All episodes were broadcast in the US by CBS, originally airing Saturdays at 10:00-10:30 pm (EST).

Gunsmoke was developed by Charles Marquis Warren and based on the radio program of the same name. The series ran for 20 seasons, making it the longest-running Western in television history.

== Synopsis ==
Gunsmoke is set in and around Dodge City, Kansas, in the post-Civil War era and centers on United States Marshal Matt Dillon (James Arness) as he enforces law and order in the city. In its original format, the series also focuses on Dillon's friendship with three other citizens of Dodge City: Doctor Galen "Doc" Adams (Milburn Stone), the town's physician; Kitty Russell (Amanda Blake), saloon girl and later owner of the Long Branch Saloon; and Chester Goode (Dennis Weaver), Dillon's assistant.

== Cast and characters ==
=== Main ===
- James Arness as Matt Dillon
- Dennis Weaver as Chester
- Milburn Stone as Doc
- Amanda Blake as Kitty

== Production ==
Season 4 consisted of 39 half-hour black-and-white episodes produced by Norman Macdonnell.

=== Casting ===
Ken Curtis appears in this season prior to his casting as Festus Haggen. He was cast in episode 21, "Jayhawkers" and episode 32, "Change of Heart".

Eddie Little Sky, who played the warrior in episode 39, "Cheyennes", was a member of the Oglala Lakota tribe. He was one of the first Native American actors to play Native American roles. Kim Winona who played the daughter in the same episode, was an enrolled member of the Santee Sioux people.

=== Writing ===
As in previous seasons, scripts would occasionally use real-life characters in the storyline. In episode 38, "Blue Horse", the character Blue Horse was an Oglala Lakota chief who had signed the Fort Laramie Treaty of 1868, along with his brothers Chief American Horse the Elder and Chief Red Cloud.

=== Production design ===
Sets were often reused across multiple episodes. The ranch used in episode 36, "Print Asper", was also used in several prior episodes. The cabin with the wooden bridge across the ditch in the beginning scenes of episode 39, "Cheyennes", was also used in multiple episodes.

Producers were not always careful about consistency with the time period. In the background of episode 24, "Doc Quits", there's a Pabst Blue Ribbon advertising sign on the wall behind Doc in the Long Branch when the new doctor approaches him. The sign may be out of place since the label wasn't created until 1893. In episode 36, "Print Asper", when Will Asper is eavesdropping at the lawyer's window you can see an electrical outlet on the wall, next to the tree.

== Episodes ==
No. overall	No. in season	Title	Directed by	Written by	Original release date	Prod. code
118	1	"Matt for Murder"	Richard Whorf	John Meston	September 13, 1958	418
Matt is being framed for killing a man.
119	2	"The Patsy"	Richard Whorf	Story by : John Meston; Screenplay by : Les Crutchfield	September 20, 1958	419
Matt doubts the veracity of a Long Branch saloon girl who claims she saw a trail hand kill a man.
120	3	"Gunsmuggler"	Richard Whorf	Story by : John Meston; Screenplay by : Les Crutchfield	September 27, 1958	423
Matt investigates an Indian raid that wiped out a family.
121	4	"Monopoly"	Seymour Berns	Story by : John Meston; Screenplay by : Les Crutchfield	October 4, 1958	426
An unscrupulous Eastern businessman is purchasing all the local freight lines.
122	5	"Letter of the Law"	Richard Whorf	Story by : John Meston; Screenplay by : Les Crutchfield	October 11, 1958	422
Matt is reluctant in evicting a man and his expectant wife from their ranch.
123	6	"Thoroughbreds"	Richard Whorf	John Meston	October 18, 1958	420
Matt and Chester out riding the range come upon a rather suspicious and unfriendly man who hustles two beautiful thoroughbreds away in a big hurry.
124	7	"Stage Hold-Up"	Ted Post	Story by : John Meston; Teleplay by : Les Crutchfield	October 25, 1958	421
Masked gunmen hold up a stagecoach carrying Matt and Chester, and later back in Dodge, the Marshal recognizes one of the robber's voices.
125	8	"Lost Rifle"	Richard Whorf	John Meston	November 1, 1958	430
Without more evidence, Matt is reluctant to arrest his friend who had an ongoing feud with a man found shot in the back.
126	9	"Land Deal"	Ted Post	Story by : John Meston; Screenplay by : Les Crutchfield	November 8, 1958	428
A wagon master leading immigrants to property outside of Dodge believes there will be trouble, and has an unorthodox request of Matt, assign him a deputy's badge.
127	10	"Lynching Man"	Richard Whorf	John Meston	November 15, 1958	438
A rancher traumatized by a lynching in his past takes the law into his own hands, which leads to disastrous results.
128	11	"How to Kill a Friend"	Richard Whorf	John Meston	November 22, 1958	429
Two gamblers attempt to bribe Matt, and when he tells them to get out of Dodge, they hire a gunman to intimidate him.
129	12	"Grass"	Richard Whorf	John Meston	November 29, 1958	434
A homesteader believes Indians are harassing him at night, and after Matt tells him to get a rifle, he mistakenly shoots and kills a cowhand.
130	13	"The Cast"	Jesse Hibbs	John Meston	December 6, 1958	433
A farmer who doesn't trust doctors blames Doc for the death of his wife.
131	14	"Robber Bridegroom"	Richard Whorf	John Meston	December 13, 1958	439
A girl engaged to be married refuses to testify against the stagecoach robber who kidnapped her.
132	15	"Snakebite"	Ted Post	John Meston	December 20, 1958	437
An old frontier plainsman is wrongfully accused of murdering a man who shot his dog.
133	16	"Gypsum Hills Feud"	Richard Whorf	Story by : John Meston; Screenplay by : Les Crutchfield	December 27, 1958	424
Matt and Chester are caught in the middle of a bitter and bloody feud between two mountain families.
134	17	"Young Love"	Seymour Berns	John Meston	January 3, 1959	425
The widow of an aging cattleman is in love with one of the men who's suspected of killing her husband.
135	18	"Marshal Proudfoot"	Jesse Hibbs	Story by : Tom Hanley; Screenplay by : John Meston	January 10, 1959	445
Chester's uncle comes to Dodge and based on letters from Chester believes him to be the Marshal.
136	19	"Passive Resistance"	Ted Post	John Meston	January 17, 1959	427
An elderly sheepherder who opposes violence refuses to tell Matt the identity of the two cattlemen who are tormenting him.
137	20	"Love of a Good Woman"	Arthur Hiller	Story by : John Meston; Screenplay by : Les Crutchfield	January 24, 1959	447
A recently released convict breaks his parole when he comes to Dodge to kill Matt.
138	21	"Jayhawkers"	Andrew V. McLaglen	John Meston	January 31, 1959	441
Matt helps a trail boss fend off Jayhawkers by escorting his cattle herd to Dodge.
139	22	"Kitty's Rebellion"	Jesse Hibbs	Story by : Marian Clark; Screenplay by : John Meston	February 7, 1959	446
The brother of a family friend visits Kitty and is displeased to find her running a saloon, and when trouble ensues, she objects to his efforts to save her honor.
140	23	"Sky"	Ted Post	Story by : John Meston; Screenplay by : Les Crutchfield	February 14, 1959	443
Matt investigates the murder of an older saloon girl, where the prime suspect is a young cowboy who fled the scene.
141	24	"Doc Quits"	Edward Ludlum	John Meston	February 21, 1959	442
Doc is resentful and feels sorry for himself when a new town doctor comes to town and makes off with his patients.
142	25	"The Bear"	Jesse Hibbs	John Meston	February 28, 1959	432
A former saloon girl's upcoming marriage is put in jeopardy by her old boyfriend when he frames the bridegroom for murder.
143	26	"The Coward"	Jesse Hibbs	John Meston	March 7, 1959	448
Matt and Chester's friend is mistaken for the Marshal and shot in the back by a coward.
144	27	"The F.U."	Andrew V. McLaglen	John Meston	March 14, 1959	440
Matt investigates a series of crimes linked to one man, but Chester bungles the outcome.
145	28	"Wind"	Arthur Hiller	John Meston	March 21, 1959	449
Matt suspects the new saloon girl of being associated with a crooked gambler.
146	29	"Fawn"	Andrew V. McLaglen	John Meston	April 4, 1959	451
Matt and Chester rescue a white woman and her half-Indian daughter held captive for ten years.
147	30	"Renegade White"	Andrew V. McLaglen	Story by : John Meston; Screenplay by : Les Crutchfield	April 11, 1959	455
Matt tracks down a "white renegade" who's selling guns to a small band of Indians that have jumped the reservation.
148	31	"Murder Warrant"	Andrew V. McLaglen	John Meston	April 18, 1959	454
Matt defends a local boy, wanted for murder in a nearby town run by a corrupt sheriff.
149	32	"Change of Heart"	Andrew V. McLaglen	John Meston	April 25, 1959	452
Matt is suspicious of a saloon girl who comes between two brothers that have inherited their father's ranch.
150	33	"Buffalo Hunter"	Ted Post	John Meston	May 2, 1959	444
Matt pursues a demented buffalo hunter who savagely killed his own men.
151	34	"The Choice"	Ted Post	John Meston	May 9, 1959	431
Matt helps a young gunman who is trying to go straight.
152	35	"There Never Was a Horse"	Andrew V. McLaglen	John Meston	May 16, 1959	453
A well-known gunfighter comes to Dodge and wants to add to his reputation by killing Matt.
153	36	"Print Asper"	Ted Post	John Meston	May 23, 1959	435
A rancher is suspected of murder after an unscrupulous lawyer tries to con him out of his land.
154	37	"The Constable"	Arthur Hiller	John Meston	May 30, 1959	450
Dodge City's merchants are unhappy when Matt clamps down on a Texas trail boss and his men.
155	38	"Blue Horse"	Andrew V. McLaglen and Ted Post	Story by : Marian Clark; Screenplay by : John Meston	June 6, 1959	456
Matt is injured and makes an ethical decision when an Indian he saved in the past now comes to his rescue.
156	39	"Cheyennes"	Ted Post	John Meston	June 13, 1959	436
While the Cavalry searches for a small band of Cheyenne, Matt and Chester focus on the gunrunners that supplied the renegades with rifles.

== Release ==
=== Broadcast ===
Season four aired Saturdays at 10:00-10:30 pm (EST) on CBS.

=== Home media ===
The fourth season was released on DVD by Paramount Home Entertainment in two volumes. The first 19 episodes were released on October 5, 2010, and the remaining 20 episodes were released on October 5, 2010.

== Reception ==
Gunsmoke held the number one primetime spot in the Nielsen ratings four years straight, for the third, fourth, fifth, and sixth seasons.

=== Awards and nominations ===
Award	Year (Note: Indicates the year of ceremony.)	Category	Nominee(s) / Work	Result	Ref(s)
Primetime Emmy Awards	1959	Best Actor in a Leading Role (Continuing Character) in a Dramatic Series	James Arness	Nominated	
Primetime Emmy Awards	1959	Best Supporting Actor (Continuing Character) in a Dramatic Series	Dennis Weaver	Won	
Primetime Emmy Awards	1959	Best Supporting Actress (Continuing Character) in a Dramatic Series	Amanda Blake	Nominated	
Primetime Emmy Awards	1959	Best Western Series	Gunsmoke	Nominated	
