= Gunsmoke season 1 =

Gunsmoke
- Season 1
- Starring: James Arness; Dennis Weaver; Milburn Stone; Amanda Blake
- No. of episodes: 39

Release
- Original network: CBS
- Original release: September 10, 1955 – August 25, 1956

Season chronology
- Next → Season 2

The first season of the American Western television series Gunsmoke aired in the United States between September 10, 1955 and August 25, 1956. The season consisted of 39 black-and-white 30 minute episodes. All episodes were broadcast in the U.S. by CBS, originally airing Saturdays at 10:00-10:30 pm (EST).

Gunsmoke was developed by Charles Marquis Warren and based on the radio program of the same name. The series ran for 20 seasons, making it the longest-running Western in television history.

== Synopsis ==
Gunsmoke is set in and around Dodge City, Kansas, in the post-Civil War era and centers on United States Marshal Matt Dillon (James Arness) as he enforces law and order in the city. In its original format, the series also focuses on Dillon's friendship with three other citizens of Dodge City: Doctor Galen "Doc" Adams (Milburn Stone), the town's physician; Kitty Russell (Amanda Blake), saloon girl and later owner of the Long Branch Saloon; and Chester Goode (Dennis Weaver), Dillon's assistant.

== Cast and characters ==
=== Main ===
- James Arness as Matt Dillon
- Dennis Weaver as Chester
- Milburn Stone as Doc
- Amanda Blake as Kitty

== Production ==
Season one was produced by Charles Marquis Warren, with Norman Macdonnell acting as associate producer.

=== Development ===
The actual pilot episode of the television series was aired as episode 26 during the first season. The sets used were totally different. The jailhouse has no door on the back wall replaced by the gun rack which usually sits on the side wall, Matt's desk is a high rolltop positioned against the wall as opposed to the flat desk more situated out into the room, the pot-belly stove and bulletin board with the wanted posters is missing, the safe is where the stove was, and the front door is not the same. The Long Branch saloon has a longer bar with a high shelve on the wall above it, the huge brass adornment that sits center stage is missing, unfamiliar taxidermy and wall decor, and the most notable change is a bartender that we have never seen in past or future episodes.

The beginning boot hill introduction is also different, revealing for the first time Marshal Dillon walking down the hill towards the fake backdrop of Dodge City in the background.

Matt uses a six-shooter with a much shorter barrel in this episode, not the seven and one-half inch barrel we normally see throughout the series.

=== Casting ===
Some of the guest cast included actors who had performed in the radio series. Episode 2 is the first of 12 appearances of John Dehner, who also performed in approximately half of the 480 radio episodes of Gunsmoke. Episode 12, "Magnus", used Robert Easton, who had also played Magnus in the radio broadcast of the episode. Lawrence Dobkin played the character "Jacklin", in both the radio and television versions of episode 31, "How to Die for Nothing".

Jester Hairston, who appeared in episode 14, was the first black performer to appear in Gunsmoke, appearing in the episode "Professor Lute Bone", January 7, 1956. He had virtually no lines, ironically considering Hairston was a graduate of the Juilliard School, the character was relegated to the background playing his fiddle. It would be another 13 years before a black actor would appear on the series.

=== Writing ===
Episode 11, "The Queue", is the first episode written by Sam Peckinpah, who wrote prolifically for Gunsmoke as well as other Western series of the era.

Episode 13, "Reed Survives" was the first television screenplay written by Les Crutchfield, who wrote 138 radio and television Gunsmoke stories and scripts, second only to the number written by the series co-creator, John Meston. Crutchfield created the character Festus Haggen. Three episodes written by him were aired after his death in 1966.

Some scripts were re-writes of scripts used in the radio series. Episode 4, "Home Surgery", was presented as a radio broadcast before it aired on television.

Storylines were sometimes taken from well-known literature. Episode 6, "Night Incident", is loosely based on Aesop's Fables, The Boy Who Cried Wolf. Titles did not always directly reflect the reference. For example, episode 17, "Robin Hood", is not based on the legend of Robin Hood. The only similarities are they both robbed from the rich. In the episode, the protagonist kept and spent the money he stole and was not the "good guy".

=== Production design ===
Wanted posters seen hanging in Matt Dillon's office are for "William H. Bonney", aka Billy the Kid and Black Bart, aka Charles Earl Bowles, a notorious stagecoach robber. Billy the Kid was born Henry McCarty on September 17 or November 23, 1859. This helps date the series from late 1877 to 1878 since Billy the Kid's first wanted poster identified him as 18 years old. Black Bart's first stagecoach robbery was July 26, 1875, and his last was November 3, 1883. Both dates fit within the aforementioned timeline.

Wanted posters for the Hole-in-the-Wall Gang and Lewt McCanles are added to the Marshal's bulletin board in episode 8, "Kite's Reward". Lewton "Lewt" McCanles was Gregory Peck's character in the 1946 Western film Duel in the Sun. These also appear in episode 25, "The Big Broad".

In episode 16, "Reward for Matt", the sign at the bottom of the stairs leading to Doc Adams's office was added and it remained there through the entire run of the series. It reads: "G. Adams, M.D. / Surgeon and / General Pract.".

=== Filming ===
Episode 30, "The Preacher", is an example of camera tricks and angles to make the 6' 7" James Arness appear smaller than Chuck Conners, who was 6 ft 5 1/2 in (1.969 m) tall.

Film locations and angles were not always considered for accuracy. In the beginning scene of episode 39, "Alarm at Pleasant Valley", Matt and Chester see a distant fire, which includes a desert of majestic saguaros, not something that would be part of the Kansas prairie of Dodge City.

== Episodes ==
No.	Title	Directed by	Written by	Original release date	Prod. code
1	"Matt Gets It"	Charles Marquis Warren	Story by : John Meston; Screenplay by : Charles Marquis Warren	September 10, 1955	502
United States Marshal Matt Dillon (James Arness) is critically wounded while attempting to arrest a cocky gunslinger who runs uncontrolled in Dodge while he recovers but is completely amazed when the Marshal challenges him again. This episode had a short introduction of the series by John Wayne. Guest cast: Paul Richards, Robert Anderson, Malcolm Atterbury, Howard Culver
2	"Hot Spell"	Charles Marquis Warren	E. Jack Neuman	September 17, 1955	503
Matt is duty-bound to protect a despised gunman from being hanged by a group of normally law-abiding ranchers for a crime he didn't commit. Guest cast: John Dehner, James Westerfield, Marvin Bryan
3	"Word of Honor"	Charles Marquis Warren	Story by : John Meston; Screenplay by : Charles Marquis Warren	October 1, 1955	504
Doc is sworn to secrecy by three kidnappers who killed a rancher's son. Guest cast: Robert Middleton, Claude Akins, Ray Boyle, Will J. Wright, Dick Paxton, Thom Carney
4	"Home Surgery"	Charles Marquis Warren	John Meston	October 8, 1955	505
Matt attempts to save a rancher's life by amputating his gangrenous leg. Guest cast: Gloria Talbott, Joe De Santis, Wright King
5	"Obie Tater"	Charles Marquis Warren	Story by : John Meston; Screenplay by : Charles Marquis Warren	October 15, 1955	507
Townspeople and outlaws want to know where an old prospector has hidden his gold. Guest cast: Royal Dano, Kathy Adams, Pat Conway, Bert Rumsey
6	"Night Incident"	Charles Marquis Warren	Charles Marquis Warren	October 29, 1955	511
Nobody believes a young boy's tales of nighttime robberies and assaults, including Matt and the boy's mother.
7	"Smoking Out the Nolans"	Charles Marquis Warren	Story by : John Meston; Screenplay by : Charles Marquis Warren	November 5, 1955	506
A rancher asks Matt to evict a couple from a home on part of his land, but the couple insists they purchased it legally and they're refusing to leave.
8	"Kite's Reward"	Charles Marquis Warren	John Meston	November 12, 1955	508
A bounty hunter is denied his reward after Matt convinces a wanted gunslinger to give up his gun for a better life.
9	"The Hunter"	Charles Marquis Warren	John Dunkel	November 26, 1955	510
Marshal Dillon must stop a buffalo hunter from breaking a treaty by trespassing into Indian territory on a hunt for hides.
10	"The Queue"	Charles Marquis Warren	Story by : John Meston; Screenplay by : Sam Peckinpah	December 3, 1955	513
A Chinese immigrant faces dishonor when two brothers cut off his pigtail.
11	"General Parsley Smith"	Charles Marquis Warren	Story by : John Meston; Screenplay by : John Dunkel	December 10, 1955	517
A Confederate Civil War General who's an incorrigible liar claims the new town banker is plotting to make off with the depositors' money.
12	"Magnus"	Charles Marquis Warren	John Meston	December 24, 1955	512
Chester is appalled when his "uncivilized" country-bumpkin brother comes to Dodge for a Christmas visit.
13	"Reed Survives"	Charles Marquis Warren	Les Crutchfield	December 31, 1955	520
A young conniving rancher's wife orchestrates a clever plan to murder her older husband by seducing a recently hired drifter.
14	"Professor Lute Bone"	Charles Marquis Warren	Story by : John Meston; Screenplay by : David Victor and Herbert Little, Jr.	January 7, 1956	515
Professor Bone and his traveling medicine show come to Dodge pedaling an elixir with potentially deadly side effects.
15	"No Handcuffs"	Charles Marquis Warren	Story by : John Meston; Screenplay by : Les Crutchfield	January 21, 1956	519
A wanted man wrongly accused of murder in a nearby town escapes to Dodge which necessitates Matt and Chester to investigate his claims of corruption.
16	"Reward for Matt"	Charles Marquis Warren	Story by : John Meston; Screenplay by : David Victor and Herbert Little, Jr.	January 28, 1956	516
A vengeful rancher's wife puts a $1,000 bounty on Matt's head after he shoots down her husband.
17	"Robin Hood"	Charles Marquis Warren	Story by : John Meston; Screenplay by : Daniel B. Ullman	February 4, 1956	518
Matt devises a plan to capture a charismatic outlaw who has a reputation for only robbing the rich.
18	"Yorky"	Charles Marquis Warren	Story by : John Meston; Screenplay by : Sam Peckinpah	February 18, 1956	514
Matt saves the life of a white boy raised by Indians, who was shot trying to fulfill his coup, by retrieving horses stolen from his Arapaho tribe.
19	"20-20"	Charles Marquis Warren	Story by : John Meston; Screenplay by : David Victor and Herbert Little, Jr.	February 25, 1956	522
Matt's friend and mentor, an aging ex-lawman arrives in Dodge, but he's followed by a man who wants revenge for the killing of his brother two years before.
20	"Reunion '78"	Charles Marquis Warren	Harold Swanton	March 3, 1956	526
A Long Branch saloon girl witnesses a killing in self-defense involving a man from her past, but she refuses to testify which jeopardizes his innocence.
21	"Helping Hand"	Charles Marquis Warren	Story by : John Meston; Screenplay by : David Victor and Herbert Little, Jr.	March 17, 1956	509
Matt attempts to help a quarrelsome young man turn his life around, after a group of ranch hands try to hang him for cattle rustling.
22	"Tap Day for Kitty"	Charles Marquis Warren	Story by : John Meston; Screenplay by : John Dunkel	March 24, 1956	521
An unpleasant and rather ugly elderly rancher up and decides that he is going to marry Kitty.
23	"Indian Scout"	Charles Marquis Warren	John Dunkel	March 31, 1956	524
An elderly Army scout married to an Indian woman is suspected of intentionally leading his troop into a Comanche ambush and now becomes the target of the townspeople's anger.
24	"The Pest Hole"	Charles Marquis Warren	David Victor and Herbert Little, Jr.	April 14, 1956	525
Doc investigates the beginning of a typhoid epidemic that hits Dodge and panics the townspeople.
25	"The Big Broad"	Charles Marquis Warren	Story by : John Meston; Screenplay by : David Victor and Herbert Little, Jr.	April 28, 1956	523
A belligerent and imposing female bully uses her situation as a woman to push around the men of Dodge.
26	"Hack Prine"	Charles Marquis Warren	John Meston	May 12, 1956	501
A friend from Matt's past, a gunfighter for hire, comes to Dodge with a job offer and unbeknownst to both of them, that job is to kill the Marshal.
27	"Cooter"	Robert Stevenson	Story by : John Meston; Screenplay by : Sam Peckinpah	May 19, 1956	527
A dishonest gambler and coward in his own right, uses a mentally challenged man as a puppet in a plot against Matt.
28	"The Killer"	Robert Stevenson	Story by : John Meston; Screenplay by : John Dunkel	May 26, 1956	528
Matt comes up with a risky plan to stop the killing spree of a psychopathic murderer, who only provokes gunfights with individuals he knows have no chance in defending themselves against him.
29	"Doc's Revenge"	Ted Post	John Dunkel	June 9, 1956	530
Doc becomes enraged when he sees a man from his past and swears to Chester that he's going to kill him.
30	"The Preacher"	Robert Stevenson	Story by : John Meston; Screenplay by : John Dunkel	June 16, 1956	529
A preacher disgusted by all the violence surrounding him has lost faith and is tormented by a bully, who despises his timid nature.
31	"How to Die for Nothing"	Ted Post	Story by : John Meston; Screenplay by : Sam Peckinpah	June 23, 1956	531
A Texas trail herder swears to avenge his brother's death, who Matt shot and killed in self-defense.
32	"Dutch George"	Robert Stevenson	John Dunkel	June 30, 1956	532
Matt may finally have the crucial evidence he needs to arrest an infamous horse thief, who makes a big mistake when he steals a young man's horse for himself.
33	"Prairie Happy"	Ted Post	Story by : John Meston; Screenplay by : David Victor and Herbert Little, Jr.	July 7, 1956	534
When the citizens of Dodge panic, Matt tries to restore order and squash rumors of a planned Pawnee attack.
34	"Chester's Mail Order Bride"	Robert Stevenson	David Victor and Herbert Little, Jr.	July 14, 1956	535
When Chester's mail-order bride arrives, neither she nor Chester are what the other is expecting.
35	"The Guitar"	Harry Horner	Story by : John Meston; Screenplay by : Sam Peckinpah	July 21, 1956	533
Two cowboys buy drinks and show a diminutive ex-soldier a good time, but when the fun ends they plan to hang him for fighting on the Union's side of the war.
36	"Cara"	Robert Stevenson	Story by : John Meston; Screenplay by : David Victor and Herbert Little, Jr.	July 28, 1956	536
Matt realizes that an old girlfriend is working on the opposite side of the law and is planning on robbing the bank with her new boyfriend.
37	"Mr. and Mrs. Amber"	Ted Post	Story by : John Meston; Screenplay by : David Victor and Herbert Little, Jr.	August 4, 1956	537
A self-described religious prophet makes life miserable for his sister and her husband.
38	"Unmarked Grave"	Ted Post	David Victor and Herbert Little, Jr.	August 18, 1956	538
A distraught middle-aged woman projects her motherly instincts on Matt's new prisoner, after she learns of her own son's outlaw past and violent death.
39	"Alarm at Pleasant Valley"	Ted Post	John Dunkel	August 25, 1956	539
While on their way back to Dodge, Matt and Chester come to the aid of a homesteader family who're attacked by a small band of marauding Kiowa Indians.

== Release ==
=== Broadcast ===
Season one aired Saturdays at 10:00-10:30 pm (EST) on CBS.

=== Home media ===
The first season was released on DVD by Paramount Home Video on July 17, 2007.

== Reception ==
=== Awards and nominations ===
Award	Year (Note: Indicates the year of ceremony.)	Category	Nominee(s) / Work	Result	Ref(s)
Primetime Emmy Awards	1956	Best Action or Adventure Series	Gunsmoke	Nominated	
