= Hot spell =

Hot spell may refer to:

- A heat wave
- Hot Spell (film), a 1958 film
- "Hot Spell" (Gunsmoke), a 1955 television episode
- "Hot Spells", a 1992 episode of Darkwing Duck
