= Marshal Dillon =

Marshal Dillon may refer to:

- Marshal Matt Dillon, the lead male character on the U.S. radio and television series Gunsmoke
- Marshal Dillon, the title sometimes used for the half-hour television episodes of the first six seasons of Gunsmoke after new episodes were expanded to one hour in length
