= Cattle Town =

1952 film by Noel M. Smith

- Theatrical release poster
- Directed by: Noel M. Smith
- Written by: Thomas W. Blackburn
- Produced by: Bryan Foy
- Starring: Dennis Morgan; Philip Carey; Amanda Blake; Rita Moreno; Paul Picerni; Ray Teal
- Cinematography: Ted D. McCord
- Edited by: Thomas Reilly
- Music by: William Lava
- Production company: Warner Bros. Pictures
- Distributed by: Warner Bros. Pictures
- Release date: September 6, 1952
- Running time: 71 minutes
- Country: United States
- Language: English

Cattle Town is a 1952 American Western film directed by Noel M. Smith, written by Thomas W. Blackburn and starring Dennis Morgan, Philip Carey, Amanda Blake, Rita Moreno, Paul Picerni and Ray Teal. The film was released by Warner Bros. Pictures on September 6, 1952.

== Plot ==
Mike McGann is sent by a government official in Texas to help rich rancher Judd Hastings remove squatters from his land. When Mike arrives, he realizes that Hastings has been chasing everyone from the region and illegally seizing their cattle. After coming to rancher Ben Curran's rescue, Mike vows to help others recover their property.

Marian Hastings begins to realize that her father is doing wrong, especially after she learns that he plans a stampede to disrupt Mike and the others. Marian, thrown from her horse and knocked unconscious, is in grave danger. Hastings tries to save his daughter and is killed. She and Mike decide to operate the Hastings ranch together.

== Production ==
Filming at the Warner Bros. Ranch was complicated by a swarm of honeybees that stung the cast and crew, including Dennis Morgan. The bees were visible in the film and their presence could not be worked into the script, so exterminators were summoned.

Studio chief Jack L. Warner wanted to terminate star Dennis Morgan's expensive contract. Morgan had been starring in elaborate musicals and comedies, and Warner now cast Morgan in an inexpensive western to be produced by Bryan Foy, an old hand at low-budget Warner productions. Warner also brought back Noel Smith, a fast-and-cheap director from the silent-film days, remembered as a specialist in reckless and dangerous action scenes. Warner was certain that Morgan would refuse the assignment and break the contract, but Morgan reported for work as scheduled and made the film for Smith.

== Reception ==
The film received mixed reviews. Los Angeles Times critic Grace Kingsley wrote that the film was "boasting more brawls, wild riding and cattle stampedes than have been seen in a long time" and praised Morgan's performance: "Morgan does his usual easy but effective acting job, but takes time out to sing, while some barbershop harmony proves melodic relief from all the excitement." Motion Picture Daily wrote: "A husky Western that develops along formula lines but contains an ample amount of fighting and some vocalizing by Dennis Morgan, this picture stacks up fairly well for its type." The Exhibitor was less indulgent: "A routine western in every sense, this doesn't have much that hasn't been seen before. This is formula on a low budget." Least enthusiastic was Film Bulletin: "This Bryan Foy western for Warners has little to recommend it. Made on a minor league budget, it gives little indication that it is a product of a major studio. A fair amount of action will get it by in theaters where westerns are in demand, but elsewhere Cattle Town rates only the lower slot on dual bills. It's definitely not for better class houses.

Exhibitor comment was also mixed. "A good western type picture, well balanced with action, comedy, and music. Did a fair weekend business." "Did poor business on this one." "Poor western. Dennis Morgan is just about washed up. The story, acting, and direction are all second rate, and the action fans will be disappointed, as there isn't very much action. Morgan bursts into song at the drop of a gun, and makes the story more ridiculous."

== Cast ==
- Dennis Morgan as Mike McGann
- Philip Carey as Ben Curran
- Amanda Blake as Marian Hastings
- Rita Moreno as Queli
- Paul Picerni as Pepe
- Ray Teal as Judd Hastings
- Jay Novello as Felipe Rojas
- George O'Hanlon as Shiloh
- Robert J. Wilke as Keeno
- Sheb Wooley as Miller
- Charles Meredith as Texas Governor
- Merv Griffin as Joe
