= Cocaine: One Man's Seduction =

1983 American TV film

- Genre: Drama
- Teleplay by: Barry Schneider
- Story by: David Goldsmith; Barry Schneider
- Directed by: Paul Wendkos
- Starring: Dennis Weaver; Karen Grassle; James Spader
- Music by: Brad Fiedel
- Country of origin: United States
- Original language: English

Production
- Executive producer: Charles W. Fries
- Producer: David Goldsmith
- Cinematography: Chuck Arnold
- Editor: Thomas Fries
- Running time: 97 minutes
- Production company: Charles Fries Productions

Original release
- Network: NBC
- Release: February 27, 1983

Cocaine: One Man's Seduction is a 1983 American drama television film directed by Paul Wendkos, starring Dennis Weaver as a real estate agent who gets addicted to cocaine.

== Plot ==
Eddie Gant was once a highly successful real estate agent, the number one for over ten years, but is now struggling to sell houses. He is frustrated that the company's top salesman is now Tad Voss, a young snob. Eddie is pressured into selling family houses, considered a dead market, and wants to break out, but does not know how. When his boss, Dan Hatten, does not make him a partner as promised, Eddie suffers a major setback and finds solace with cocaine, arranged through his business friends Robin Barstowe and Bruce Neumann.

Through using cocaine, he feels on top of the world, and finds the confidence to act like a top salesman again. He is allowed to try to sell a luxury home, but the potential buyer, Mrs. Marchais, is not impressed and leaves quickly. He decides that his only way to the top is through using cocaine and starts to do it more regularly, finding success. He buys a new car and wardrobe, and at first, his wife Barbara is enthusiastic. He even wants to meet halfway his teenage son Buddy, who feels pressured by his dad to enroll in law school. As Eddie is making more and more late nights, Barbara quickly starts to complain that she never sees him anymore.

Simultaneously, Mort Broome, an old friend, tries to commit suicide by shooting himself with a rifle and blames the incident on cocaine use. Eddie is shocked but continues his path, despite getting frequent headaches. He purchases a large amount of the drugs from Bruce and spirals downward. He estranges himself from his family and nearly begins an affair with Robin, who makes clear to him that they only connect through drugs and that he should stop using. Meanwhile, Mort detects the symptoms of cocaine abuse and confronts his friend, but Eddie claims to be nothing more than a casual user.

Eventually, Buddy finds his father's stash in his shaving equipment, and Barbara later finds some of the drugs in Buddy's sweatshirt. Eddie yells at Buddy about the drugs, as Barbara storms out of the room. Buddy expresses his disgust with his father, but doesn't reveal the truth to his mother. Eddie promises Buddy that he has quit cold turkey, but when a major sale opportunity comes up, he steals Barbara's engagement ring to purchase cocaine from Bruce. Bruce, however, is arrested and charged with drug possession with intent to sell before Eddie can get to him. He forces himself into Robin’s place and violently steals her drugs, which had been thrown in the trash. Upon meeting with wealthy clients, Eddie has a paranoia attack followed by an overdose. He survives, but is sentenced by a judge to two years on probation and a mandatory drug rehabilitation program. Embarrassed by the situation, he perceives it as a wake-up call and vows to better his life, supported by the love of his family.

== Cast ==
- Ed Butler as Cocaine Eddie
- Dennis Weaver as Eddie Gant
- Karen Grassle as Barbara Gant
- Pamela Bellwood as Robin Barstowe
- James Spader as Buddy Gant
- David Ackroyd as Bruce Neumann
- Jeffrey Tambor as Mort Broome
- Richard Venture as Dan Hatten
- Dennis Howard as Jack Brayler
- Ted Le Plat as Tad Voss
- Dennis Robertson as Stu
- Terry Wills as Zacker
- Kieu Chinh as Mrs. Marchais
- Denise Crosby as Teller
