= The Ordeal of Dr. Mudd =

1980 film by Paul Wendkos

- Directed by: Paul Wendkos
- Written by: Michael Berk; Douglas Schwartz
- Starring: Dennis Weaver; Susan Sullivan; Richard Dysart; Michael McGuire; Nigel Davenport; Arthur Hill; Larry Larson; Bill Gribble
- Music by: Gerald Fried
- Production companies: Martin Starger Productions; BSR Productions; Marble Arch Productions
- Distributed by: CBS-TV
- Release date: March 25, 1980
- Running time: 145 minutes
- Country: United States
- Language: English

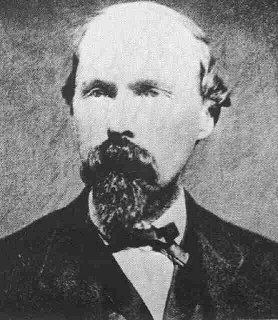
Samuel Mudd

The Ordeal of Dr. Mudd is a 1980 historical drama film directed by Paul Wendkos. Based on a true story, it revolves around the 1865 assassination of Abraham Lincoln. Dennis Weaver plays the lead role of Dr. Samuel A. Mudd, who was imprisoned for conspiring with John Wilkes Booth in the killing.

== Production ==
In 1979, during the filming of the movie on Monterey Square in Savannah, Georgia, preservationist and antiques dealer Jim Williams hung a flag of Nazi Germany outside of a window at his Mercer House home in an attempt to disrupt the shoot, after the film company declined to make a donation to the local humane society, as Williams had requested. The Congregation Mickve Israel, located across the square, complained to the city. Williams was later the main subject of John Berendt's 1994 book Midnight in the Garden of Good and Evil.

== Historical accuracy ==
At the end of the film a written message appears stating that President Jimmy Carter "exonerated [Mudd] of all guilt in the assassination of Abraham Lincoln". Reviewer Bill Steigerwald stated this was misleading: Carter had written a letter to Mudd's grandson in 1979 saying that he (Carter) "personally felt that Dr. Mudd was innocent" but that this was "by no means an official act". A response from the film's producers noted that Time magazine had also summarized events by remarking that "President Carter has exonerated [Mudd] of guilt".

== Cast ==
- Dennis Weaver as Dr. Samuel A. Mudd
- Susan Sullivan as Frances Mudd
- Richard Dysart as Edwin Stanton
- Michael McGuire as Captain Murdock
- Nigel Davenport as Colonel George St. Leger Grenfell
- Arthur Hill as General Thomas Ewing Jr.
- Larry Larson as Thorpe
- Bill Gribble as John Wilkes Booth
