= Takeru: Letter of the Law =

1994 video game

- German cover art
- Developer: Fun Project
- Publishers: JP: Panasonic; NA: Sunsoft; EU: Network Entertainment
- Artist: Buichi Terasawa
- Writer: Buichi Terasawa
- Composer: Rory McFarlane
- Platforms: 3DO, Windows, Mac
- Release: April 29, 1994
- Genre: Adventure
- Mode: Single player

Takeru: Letter of the Law is a video game based on the manga series by Buichi Terasawa. It was originally released by Matsushita Electric Industrial for the 3DO Interactive Multiplayer only in Japan as Terasawa Buichi no Takeru (寺沢武一の武), before being converted to the Microsoft Windows and Mac OS computer systems and published internationally Takeru: Letter of the Law and Buichi Terasawa's Takeru in 1996. The manga was published in English in 1992–1993 as Takeru - The Bad Boy of Yamato.

== Plot ==
The game's and the manga's story follows the bounty hunter shinobi (ninja) Takeru Ichimonji and his female sidekick Bumbuku in the land of Yamato as they battle the evil sorceress Kaganju to rescue the Wind Princess Hien and prevent the resurrection of Queen Himiko.

== Reception ==
The game received mixed reviews, including the scores of 22/40 from Japanese magazine Weekly Famicom Tsūshin (Famitsu), 37/100 from German magazine PC Player, and 6.8/10 from UK magazine PC Zone.
