= Dennis Weaver =

American actor (1924–2006)

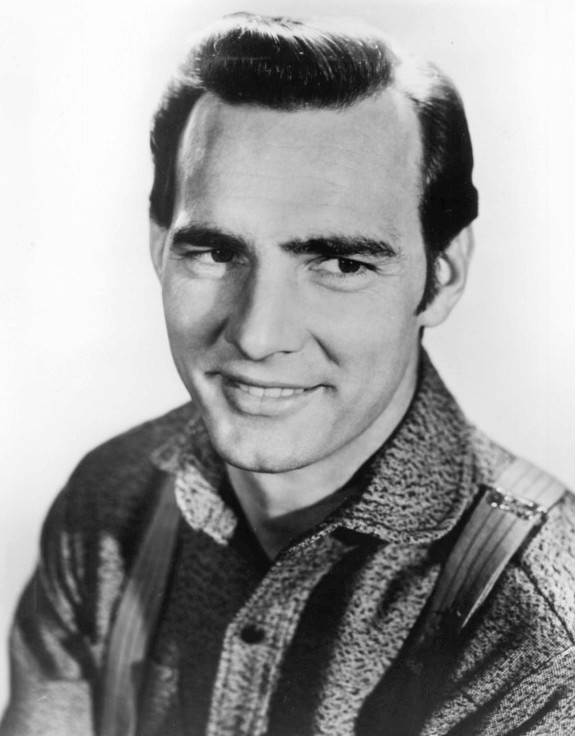
- Weaver in 1960
- Born: Billy Dennis Weaver; June 4, 1924; Joplin, Missouri, U.S.
- Died: February 24, 2006 (aged 81); Ridgway, Colorado, U.S.
- Occupation: Actor
- Years active: 1950–2006
- Spouse: Gerry Stowell (m. 1945)
- Children: 3

President of the Screen Actors Guild
- In office 1973–1975
- Preceded by: John Gavin
- Succeeded by: Kathleen Nolan

Billy Dennis Weaver (June 4, 1924 – February 24, 2006) was an American actor and president of the Screen Actors Guild, best known for his work in television and films from the early 1950s until just before his death in 2006. Weaver's two most famous roles were as Marshal Matt Dillon's deputy Chester Goode on the western Gunsmoke and as Deputy Marshal Sam McCloud on the police drama McCloud. He starred in the 1971 television film Duel, the first film of director Steven Spielberg. He is remembered for his role as the twitchy motel attendant in Orson Welles's film Touch of Evil (1958). He appeared in the TV series Wildfire.

== Early life ==
Weaver was born on June 4, 1924, in Joplin, Missouri, the son of Walter Leon "Doc" Weaver and his wife, Lenna Leora (née Prather). Weaver wanted to be an actor from childhood. He lived in Shreveport, Louisiana, for several years, and for a short time in Manteca, California. He studied at Joplin Junior College and then transferred to the University of Oklahoma at Norman, where he studied drama and was a track star, setting records in several events. During World War II, he served as a pilot in the United States Navy, flying Grumman F4F Wildcat fighter aircraft. After the war, he married Gerry Stowell, his childhood sweetheart, with whom he had three children. Under the name Billy D. Weaver, he tried out for the 1948 U.S. Olympic team in the decathlon, finishing sixth behind 17-year-old high school track star Bob Mathias. However, only the top three finishers were selected. Weaver later commented, "I did so poorly [in the Olympic Trials], I decided to ... stay in New York and try acting."

== Career ==
Weaver's first role on Broadway came as an understudy to Lonny Chapman as Turk Fisher in Come Back, Little Sheba. He eventually took over the role from Chapman in the national touring company. Solidifying his choice to become an actor, Weaver enrolled in the Actors Studio, where he met Shelley Winters. In the beginning of his acting career, he supported his family by doing odd jobs, including selling vacuum cleaners, tricycles, and women's hosiery.

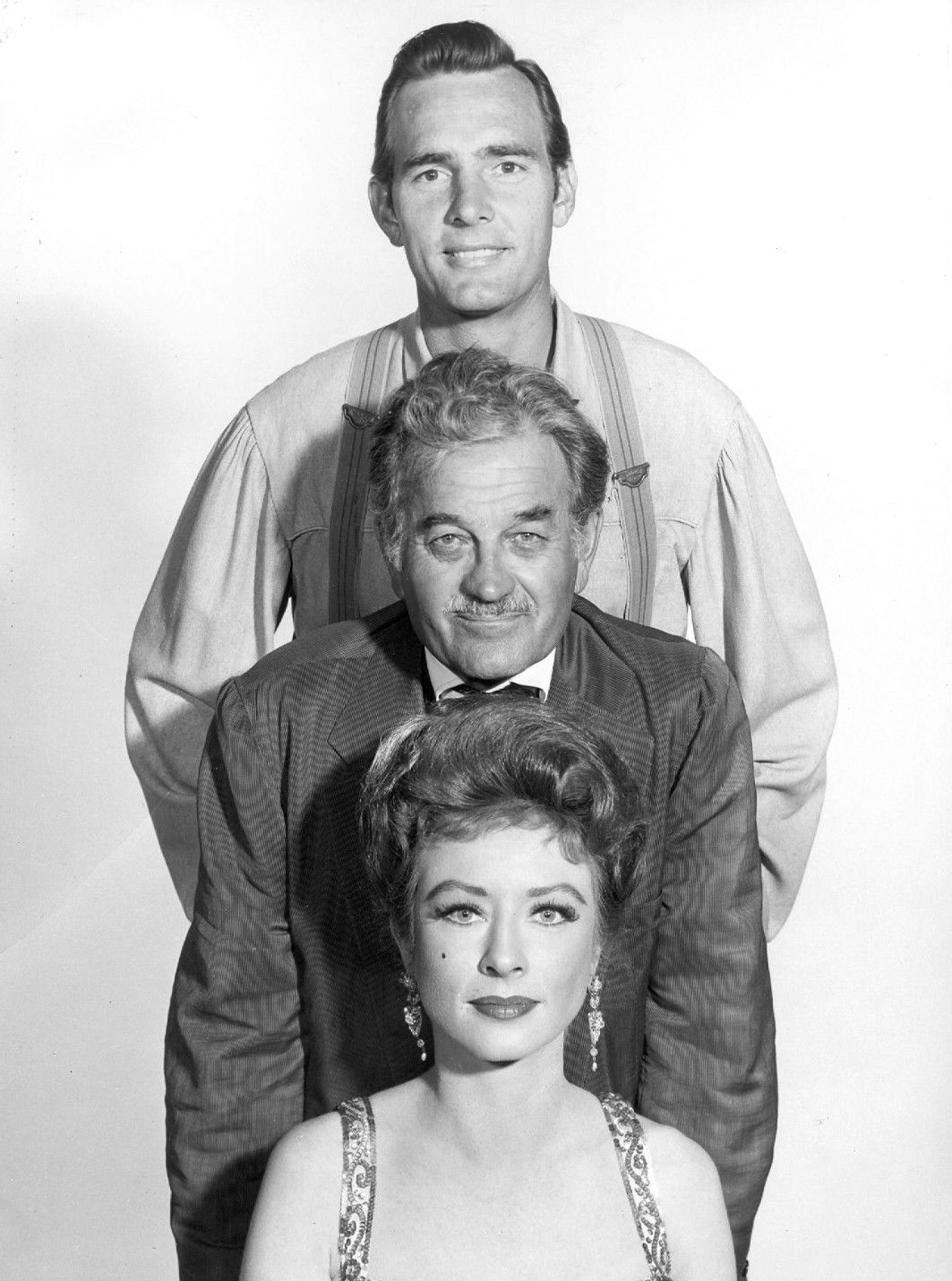
Weaver as Chester, Milburn Stone as Doc, and Amanda Blake as Kitty in Gunsmoke, 1960

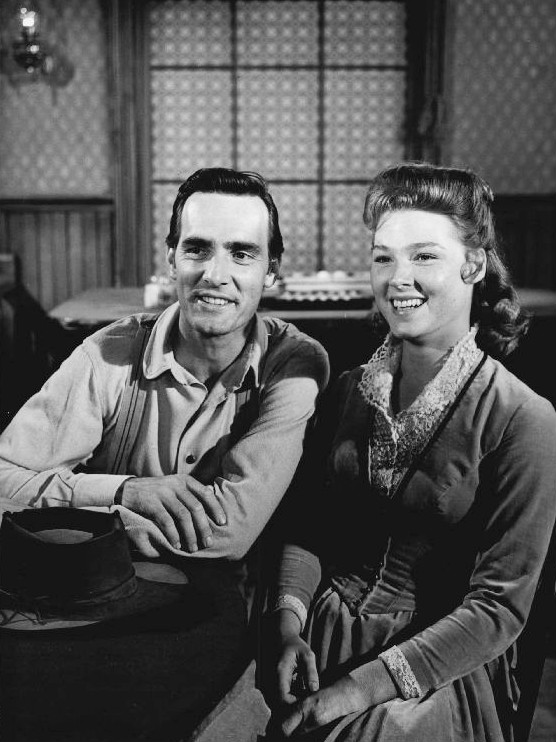
Weaver and Mariette Hartley on the set of Gunsmoke, 1962

In 1952, Shelley Winters helped him get a contract from Universal Studios. He made his film debut that same year in the movie The Redhead from Wyoming. Over the next three years, he played in a series of movies, but still had to work odd jobs to support his family. In 1955 he appeared in an episode of The Lone Ranger "The Tell-Tale Bullet", which is viewable on YouTube. While delivering flowers, he heard he had landed the role of Chester Goode, the limping, loyal assistant of Marshal Matt Dillon (James Arness) on the new television series Gunsmoke. It was his big break; the show went on to become the highest-rated and longest-running live action series in United States television history (1955 to 1975), an honor now held by Law & Order: Special Victims Unit. He received an Emmy Award in 1959 for Best Supporting Actor (Continuing Character) in a Dramatic Series.

According to the Archive of American Television interview with Weaver, the producer had him in mind for Chester, but could not locate him, and was delighted when he showed up to audition. Never having heard the radio show, Weaver gave Chester's "inane" dialog his best "method" delivery. Disappointed in his delivery, however, the producer asked for something humorous, and resurrecting "a dialect from some lost county in Oklahoma," Weaver nailed it. His character's limp came about when the producer pointed out that sidekicks usually exhibit some diminishing trait that makes them less heroic than the star. To keep from losing the part, college decathlon champion Weaver settled on using a stiff leg, something "simple and consistent," allowing him still to perform all the actions needed in a Western.

In 1957, Weaver appeared as Commander B.D. Clagett in a single episode of the television series The Silent Service titled "Two Davids and Goliath". Having become famous as Chester, he was next cast in an offbeat supporting role in the 1958 Orson Welles film Touch of Evil, in which he played a face-twisting, body-contorting eccentric employee of a remote motel who nervously repeated, "I'm the night man." In 1960, he appeared in an episode of Alfred Hitchcock Presents titled "Insomnia", in which his character suffers from sleeplessness owing to the tragic death of his wife. He also co-starred in a 1961 episode of The Twilight Zone titled "Shadow Play". In that episode, Weaver's character is trapped inside his own revolving nightmare, repeatedly being tried, sentenced, and then executed in the electric chair. In 1964, Weaver left Gunsmoke to star as a friendly veterinary physician raising an adopted Chinese boy as a single father in NBC's one season comedy drama Kentucky Jones. He had a significant role in the 1966 western Duel at Diablo, with James Garner and Sidney Poitier. His next substantial role was as Tom Wedloe on the CBS family series Gentle Ben, with co-star Clint Howard, from 1967 to 1969. Decades earlier, as a student at Oklahoma University in the mid-1940s, it was Weaver who had introduced Clint's parents, Rance Howard and Jean Speegle Howard, to one another when the three of them were theater students at OU.

In 1970, Weaver landed the title role in the NBC series McCloud, for which he received two Emmy Award nominations. In 1974, he was nominated for Best Lead Actor in a Limited Series (McCloud) and in 1975, for Outstanding Lead Actor in a Limited Series. The show, about a modern Western lawman who ends up in New York City, was loosely based on the Clint Eastwood film Coogan's Bluff. His frequent use of the affirming Southernism, "There you go," became a catchphrase for the show. During the series, in 1971, Weaver also appeared in Duel, a television movie directed by Steven Spielberg. Spielberg selected Weaver based on the intensity of his earlier performance in Touch of Evil.

Weaver was also a recording artist, with most of his tracks being spoken-word recordings with musical accompaniment. He released several singles and albums between 1959 and 1984, most notable of which was his eponymous Im'press Records LP in 1972, the cover of which featured a portrait of Weaver in character as McCloud; it was the first of seven albums he recorded.

From 1973 to 1975, Weaver was president of the Screen Actors Guild.

His later series during the 1980s (both of which lasted only one season) were Stone in which Weaver played a Joseph Wambaugh-esque police sergeant turned crime novelist and Buck James in which he played a Texas-based surgeon and rancher. (Buck James was loosely based on real-life Texas doctor James "Red" Duke.) He portrayed a Navy rear admiral for 22 episodes of a 1983–1984 series, Emerald Point N.A.S.

In 1977, he portrayed a husband who physically abuses his wife (portrayed by Sally Struthers) in the made-for-TV movie Intimate Strangers, one of the first network features to depict domestic violence. In 1978, Weaver played the trail boss R. J. Poteet in the television miniseries Centennial, in the installment titled "The Longhorns". Weaver also appeared in many acclaimed television films, including Amber Waves (1980) with Kurt Russell. Also in 1980, he portrayed Dr. Samuel Mudd, who was imprisoned for involvement in the Lincoln assassination, in The Ordeal of Dr. Mudd and starred with his real-life son Robby Weaver in the short-lived NBC police series Stone. In 1983, he played a real estate agent addicted to cocaine in Cocaine: One Man's Seduction. Weaver received probably the best reviews of his career when he starred in the 1987 film Bluffing It, in which he played a man who is illiterate. In February 2002, he appeared on the animated series The Simpsons (episode DABF07, "The Lastest Gun in the West") as the voice of aging Hollywood cowboy legend Buck McCoy.

For his contribution to the television industry, Dennis Weaver was given a star on the Hollywood Walk of Fame at 6822 Hollywood Blvd, and on the Dodge City (KS) Trail of Fame. In 1981, he was inducted into the Hall of Great Western Performers with the Bronze Wrangler Award at the National Cowboy & Western Heritage Museum in Oklahoma City, Oklahoma.

In the 1980s and 1990s, Weaver as McCloud was used to promote a rock show in New York City. He also hosted segments for the Encore Westerns premium cable network in the late 1990s and early to mid-2000s.

Weaver's last work was done on an ABC Family cable television show called Wildfire, where he played Henry Ritter, the father of Jean Ritter and the co-owner of Raintree Ranch. His role on the show was cut short by his death.

Weaver had an interest in the UFO topic and in 1986 narrated a daily toll-charge phone message service called the UFO Contact Newsline, produced in his basement and operated by his son Rusty Weaver and partner Paul Shepherd. Each three-minute report featured "late-breaking news of human contact with extraterrestrials, inside stories of UFO sightings and scientific verification of alien visits to planet Earth" according to an article in the Los Angeles Times.

== Music career ==
It was reported in the November 1982 issue of Music Row that Weaver was seriously pursuing a career in country music. He and singer Noel were the first artists signed to the Deep South Records label, which also had Coni Causey, C.C. Conley, Ron Blair and Billy Jack on their roster. Working with producer Allen Cash, Weaver recorded a single "If I Had a Love Song" that was released that year.

== Personal life ==
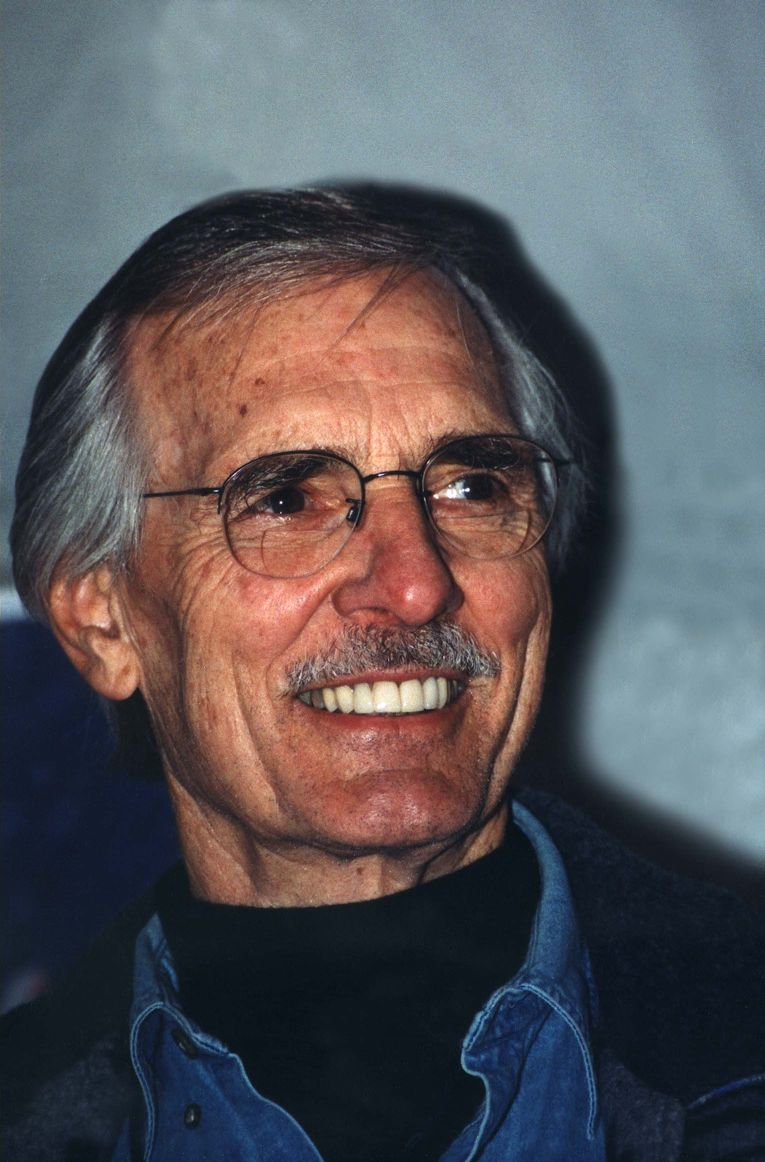
Weaver in 2000

Weaver was reported to have become a pescatarian in 1958.

Weaver married Gerry Stowell after World War II, and they had three sons: Richard, Robert, and Rustin Weaver. Gerry died April 26, 2016, at 90.

Weaver's home in Ridgway, Colorado, exemplified his commitment to preserving the environment. In the late 1980s, he commissioned architect Michael Reynolds to design and build his new residence, which incorporated into its construction various recycled materials, such as old automobile tires and discarded cans, and featured passive solar power and other ecotechnologies. Weaver called his home Earthship, the same name given to the design concept pioneered by Reynolds and advanced by him as part of what was then a growing interest in "sustainable architecture" by environmentalists. Weaver and his family lived at Earthship for over 14 years, until 2004.

In July 2003, Weaver lost a daughter-in-law, Lynne Ann Weaver, wife of son Robby Weaver, in Santa Monica, California, when a car driven at high speed plowed through shoppers at the Santa Monica Farmers Market. She was one of 10 people killed in the incident.

Weaver was a lifelong active Democrat.

== Activism ==
Weaver was an environmentalist, who promoted the use of alternative fuels, such as hydrogen and wind power, through the Institute of Ecolonomics, a nonprofit environmental organization he established in 1993 in Berthoud, Colorado. "Ecolonomics" is a term formed by combining the words ecology and economics. He was also involved with John Denver's WindStar Foundation, and he founded an organization called L.I.F.E. (Love is Feeding Everyone), which provided food for 150,000 needy people a week in Los Angeles.

Weaver was also active in liberal political causes. He used his celebrity status as a fundraiser and organizer for George McGovern's campaign for President in 1972.

In 2004, he led a fleet of alternative-fuel vehicles across the United States to raise awareness about America's dependence on oil.

Weaver was consistently involved with the annual Genesis Awards, which honor those in the news and entertainment media who bring attention to the plight and suffering of animals. Established by the Ark Trust, the award has been presented by the Humane Society of the United States since 2002.

There will come a time ... when civilized people will look back in horror on our generation and the ones that preceded it – the idea that we should eat other living things running around on four legs, that we should raise them just for the purpose of killing them! The people of the future will say "meat-eaters!" in disgust and regard us in the same way we regard cannibals and cannibalism — Dennis Weaver

== Death ==
Weaver died from prostate cancer at his home in Ridgway, Colorado, on February 24, 2006, at age 81.

== Filmography ==
=== Film ===
Year	Title	Role	Notes
1952	Horizons West	Dandy Taylor	
1952	The Raiders	Dick Logan (uncredited)	
1953	The Redhead from Wyoming	Matt Jessup	
1953	The Lawless Breed	Jim Clements	
1953	The Mississippi Gambler	Julian Conant (uncredited)	
1953	It Happens Every Thursday	Al, Chamber of Commerce President (uncredited)	
1953	Law and Order	Frank Durling	
1953	Column South	Menguito	
1953	The Man from the Alamo	Reb (uncredited)	
1953	The Golden Blade	Rabble Rouser (uncredited)	
1953	The Nebraskan	Captain De Witt (uncredited)	
1953	War Arrow	Pino	
1954	Pasties on a Cat	Leering Audience Member (uncredited)	
1954	Dangerous Mission	Ranger Clerk	
1954	Dragnet	Police Captain R.A. Lohrman	
1954	The Bridges at Toko-Ri	Air Intelligence Officer (uncredited)	
1955	Ten Wanted Men	Sheriff Clyde Gibbons	
1955	Seven Angry Men	John Brown Jr.	
1955	Chief Crazy Horse	Major Carlisle	
1955	Storm Fear	Hank	
1956	Navy Wife		
1958	Touch of Evil	Mirador Motel Night Manager	
1960	The Gallant Hours	Lieutenant Commander Andy Lowe	
1961	Sing for Me, Canary Boy	Blake Puddingstock	
1963	The Cost of Riding Shotgun	Sheriff Evan America	
1966	Duel at Diablo	Willard Grange	
1966	Way...Way Out	Hoffman	
1967	Gentle Giant	Tom Wedloe	
1968	Mission Batangas	Chip Corbett	
1970	A Man Called Sledge	Erwin Ward	
1971	What's the Matter with Helen?	Linc Palmer	
1971	Duel	David Mann	
1972	Mothership Tycoon	Captain Buck Finnster	
1972	Horsetrailer Tycoon	Captain Buck Finnster	
1973	House Arrest	Sergeant Chester McFeeley	
1973	Terror on the Beach	Neil Glynn	
1977	Cry for Justice		
1979	Surgery Train	Dr. Lance Goiter	
1982	Splattercakes for Mama	Smokey Joe Burgess	
1995	Two Bits & Pepper	Sheriff Pratt	
1997	Telluride: Time Crosses Over		Cameo appearance
1998	Escape from Wildcat Canyon	Grandpa Flint	
2000	Submerged	Buck Stevens	
2000	The Virginian	Sam Balaam	
2001	Elephant Rage	Elephant	Voice
2004	Home on the Range	Abner	Voice

=== Television ===
Year	Title	Role	Notes
1954	Cavalcade of America	Prisoner	Episode: "G for Goldberger"
1954–1955	Dragnet	Various roles	6 episodes
1955–1964	Gunsmoke	Chester / Chester Goode	290 episodes
1955	The Lone Ranger	Jeb Sullivan	Episode: "The Tell-Tale Bullet"
1955	Schlitz Playhouse of Stars	Ben	Episode: "Underground"
1956	Big Town		Episode: "Crime in the City Room"
1957	The Silent Service	Lt. Cmdr. Bladen D. Claggett	Episode: "The Two Davids and Goliath"
1958	Climax!	Steve Maclyn	Episode: "Burst of Fire"
1958	Playhouse 90	Karl Ohringer	Episode: "The Dungeon"
1959	Have Gun – Will Travel	Monk	
1960	Alfred Hitchcock Presents	Charles 'Charlie' Morton Cavender	Episode: "Insomnia"
1961	The Twilight Zone	Adam Grant	Episode: "Shadow Play"
1964–1965	Kentucky Jones	Kenneth Yarborough "Kentucky" Jones	26 episodes
1965	Combat!	Noah	Episode: "The Farmer"
1965	Dr. Kildare	Wayne Wandemeir	Episode: "A Reverence for Life"
1966	Walt Disney's Wonderful World of Color	George Tucker, the Sundown Kid	2 episodes ("Gallegher Goes West")
1967–1969	Gentle Ben	Tom Wedloe	56 episodes
1969	Judd, for the Defense	Prof. Robert Beardsley	Episode: "The View from the Ivory Tower"
1969	The Name of the Game	Walter Grayson	Episode: "Give Till It Hurts"
1970–1977	McCloud	Sam McCloud	46 episodes
1970	That Girl	Lewis Franks	Episode: "That Metermaid"
1970	The Virginian	Jed Haines	Episode: "Train of Darkness"
1970	Swing Out, Sweet Land	Tom Lincoln	Television special
1971	The Forgotten Man	Lt. Joe Hardy	Television movie
1971	Duel	David Mann	Television movie
1972	Rolling Man	Lonnie McAfee	Television movie
1972	The Great Man's Whiskers	Abraham Lincoln	Television movie
1973	Female Artillery	Deke Chambers	Television movie
1973	Terror on the Beach	Neil Glynn	Television movie
1977	Intimate Strangers	Donald Halston	Television movie
1978	Centennial	R.J. Poteet	12 episodes
1978	Pearl	Colonel Jason Forrest	Miniseries
1978	The Islander	Gable McQueen	Television movie
1978	Ishi: The Last of His Tribe	Professor Benjamin Fuller	Television movie
1979	The Ordeal of Patty Hurst	Charles Bates	Television movie
1979	Police Story	Sgt. Ted Bentley	Episode: "A Cry for Justice"
1979	Stone	Daniel Ellis Stone	Television movie
1980	Stone	Daniel Ellis Stone	9 episodes
1980	Amber Waves	Bud Burkhardt	Television movie
1980	The Ordeal of Dr. Mudd	Samuel Mudd	Television movie
1981	The Day the Loving Stopped	Aaron Danner	Television movie
1982	Don't Go to Sleep	Phillip	Television movie
1983–1984	Emerald Point N.A.S.	Rear Admiral Thomas Mallory	22 episodes
1983	Cocaine: One Man's Seduction	Eddie Gant	Television movie
1985	Magnum, P.I.	Lacy Fletcher, Present Day	Episode: "Let Me Hear the Music"
1985	Going for the Gold: The Bill Johnson Story	Wally Johnson	Television movie
1986	A Winner Never Quits	Mr. Wyshner	Television movie
1986	Headin' Home for the Holidays	Tom Miller	Television special
1987	Bluffing It	Jack Duggan	Television movie
1987–1988	Buck James	Doctor Buck James	19 episodes
1988	Disaster at Silo 7	Sheriff Ben Harlen	Television movie
1989	The Return of Sam McCloud	Sam McCloud	Television movie
1991-1994	Captain Planet and the Planeteers	Multiple	2 episodes
1992	Mastergate	V.P. Dale Burden	Television movie
1993	Ancient Secrets of the Bible, Part II	Narrator	Television movie
1994	Greyhounds	Chance Wayne	Television movie
1994	The Great Battles of the Civil War	Robert E. Lee	40 episodes
1994-1995	Lonesome Dove: The Series	Buffalo Bill Cody	5 episodes
1997	Seduction in a Small Town	Sam Jenks	Television movie
1997	Stolen Women: Captured Hearts	Captain Robert Farnsworth	Television movie
2000	The Virginian	Sam Balaam	Television movie
2000	High Noon	Mart Howe	Television movie
2001	The Beast	Walter McFadden	2 episodes
2001	Family Law	Judge Richard Lloyd	Episode: "Sex, Lies and Internet"
2002	The Simpsons	Buck McCoy (voice)	Episode: "The Lastest Gun in the West"
2003	Touched by an Angel	Emmett Rivers	Episode: "The Good Earth"
2005	Wildfire	Henry	13 episodes

=== Video games ===
Year	Title	Role	Notes
1996	Voyeur II	Sheriff John Parker	

== Theatre ==
- 1950: Come Back, Little Sheba – Performer
- 1951: Out West of Eighth – Virgil Lavendar
