= Amanda Blake =

American actress (1929–1989)

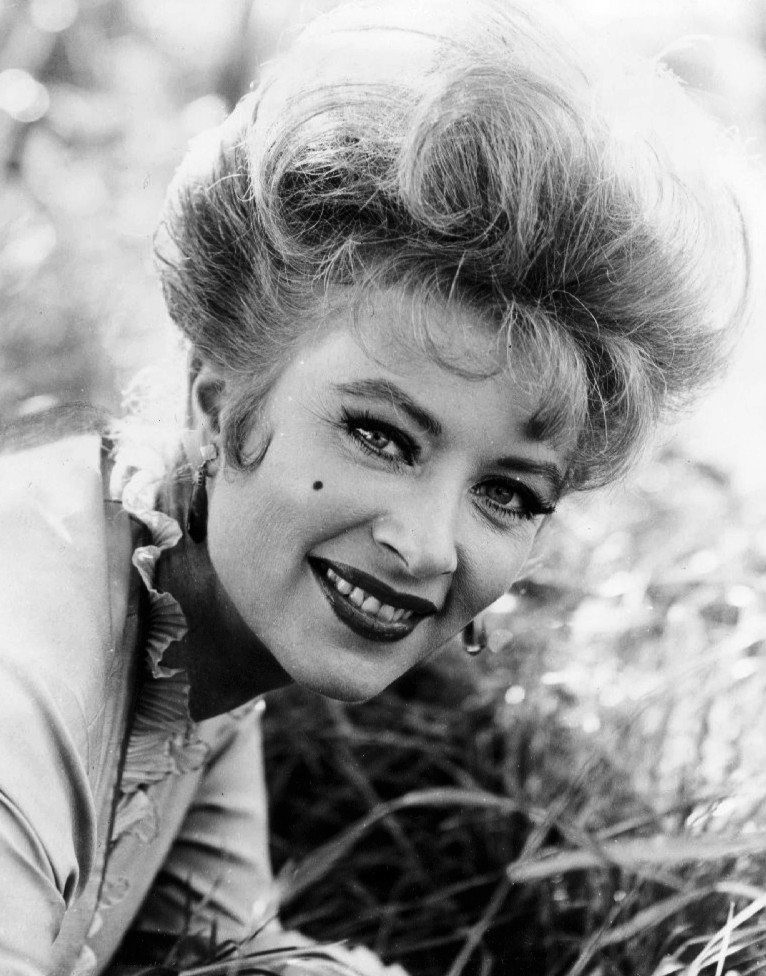
- As Miss Kitty Russell in Gunsmoke (1966)
- Born: Beverly Louise Neill; February 20, 1929; Buffalo, New York, U.S.
- Died: August 16, 1989 (aged 60); Sacramento, California, U.S.
- Occupation: Actress
- Years active: 1950–1989
- Spouses: Jack Shea (m. 1952; div. 1953) Don Whitman (m. 1954; div. 1956) Jason Day (m. 1964; div. 1967) Frank Gilbert (m. 1967; div. 1982) Mark Spaeth (m. 1984; died 1985)

Amanda Blake (born Beverly Louise Neill; February 20, 1929 – August 16, 1989) was an American actress best known for the role of the red-haired saloon proprietress "Miss Kitty Russell" on the Western television series Gunsmoke. Along with her fourth husband, Frank Gilbert, she ran one of the first successful programs for breeding cheetahs in captivity.

== Early life ==
Amanda Blake was born Beverly Louise Neill in Buffalo, New York, the only child of Jesse and Louise (née Puckett) Neill. Her father was a banker. Blake was a telephone operator and briefly attended Pomona College before she took up acting. Blake attended Brenau Academy from 1944 to 1945. She then served on the board of advisors and became a trustee.

== Career ==
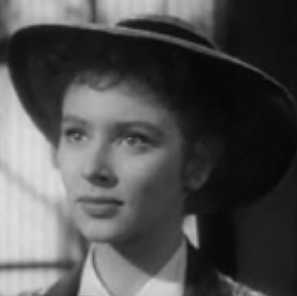
In Stars in My Crown (1950)

In the late 1940s, Blake was signed to Metro-Goldwyn-Mayer as the studio saw her as its next Greer Garson. She appeared in a few Hollywood films, such as the 1952 Western Cattle Town and in the starring role of Miss Robin Crusoe, a 1954 adaptation of the Robinson Crusoe adventure. In 1954, she appeared in A Star Is Born.

Blake became best known for her 19-year stint as the saloon-keeper Miss Kitty on the television series Gunsmoke from 1955 to 1974. On February 27, 1974, Blake brought a lion named Kemo onto the Gunsmoke set.

Because of her continuing role on television, Blake rarely had time for films. She did appear on a number of television shows, including a recurring comedy routine on The Red Skelton Show; as a celebrity on Hollywood Squares, Tattletales, and the 1970s revival of Match Game; and comedy appearances on the Dean Martin Celebrity Roast.

In 1957, Blake guest-starred as Betty Lavon-Coate in the episode titled "Coate of Many Colors" on Rod Cameron's crime drama, State Trooper. Later, after a Gunsmoke reunion film, she made two feature-film appearances: in The Boost, a drug-addiction drama starring James Woods and Sean Young, and B.O.R.N, both in 1988.

In 1968, Blake was inducted into the Hall of Great Western Performers at the National Cowboy and Western Heritage Museum in Oklahoma City. She was the third performer inducted, after Tom Mix and Gary Cooper, selected in 1958 and 1966.

== Personal life ==
Blake was married five times, first to Jack Shea (1952–53), then Don Whitman in 1954, divorced from him in 1956. After her divorce from Whitman, she went onto the "saloon set" of Gunsmoke. Blake felt like it was home to her on the days when she was not needed. She married Austin, Texas, city councilman Mark Edward Spaeth in 1984. Spaeth died of AIDS-related pneumonia in 1985.

=== Animal welfare ===
After Gunsmoke, Blake went into semiretirement at her home in Phoenix and took on few film or television projects. She instead devoted more time to her animals. She had been known for bringing her pet lion, Kemo, onto the Gunsmoke set. Kemo lived in an animal compound at her home, at which husband Frank Gilbert and she ran an experimental breeding program for cheetahs. They were some of the first to breed cheetahs successfully in captivity; they raised seven generations.

Blake joined with others in 1971 to form the Arizona Animal Welfare League, today the oldest and largest "no-kill" animal shelter in the state. In 1985, she helped finance the start-up of the Performing Animal Welfare Society. Blake reportedly was a one-time board member of the Humane Society of the United States. In 1997, the Amanda Blake Memorial Wildlife Refuge opened at Rancho Seco Park in Herald, California. The refuge provides sanctuary for free-ranging African hoofed wildlife, most of which were originally destined for exotic animal auctions or hunting ranches.

=== Declining health and death ===
In 1977, Blake, who was a heavy cigarette smoker, developed oral cancer that was successfully treated with surgery. She became a supporter of the American Cancer Society and made fundraising appearances throughout the country. In 1984, she was the recipient of the society's annual Courage Award, which was presented to her by then-U.S. President Ronald Reagan.

On August 16, 1989, Blake died of AIDS-related hepatitis at Mercy General Hospital in Sacramento, California, at the age of 60. Her death was initially attributed to throat cancer, but after her death, her doctor publicly announced her death was due to complications from AIDS. How Blake contracted the disease is unknown. Blake's close friends insisted that she was not a drug user or sexually promiscuous, and that she may have acquired AIDS from her fifth husband, who also had died of AIDS-related pneumonia in 1985.

== Filmography ==
Film
Year	Title	Role	Notes
1950	Stars in My Crown	Faith Radmore Samuels	
1950	Duchess of Idaho	Linda Kinston	
1950	Counterspy Meets Scotland Yard	Karen Michelle	
1951	Smuggler's Gold	Susan Hodges	
1951	China Corsair	Jane Richards	Uncredited
1951	Never Trust a Gambler	The Redhead at Police Station	Uncredited
1951	Criminal Lawyer	Receptionist	Uncredited
1951	Sunny Side of the Street	Susie Manning	
1951	The Family Secret	Telephone Girl	Uncredited
1952	Scarlet Angel	Susan Bradley	
1952	Cattle Town	Marian Hastings	
1953	Lili	Peach Lips (red-haired dame)	
1953	Sabre Jet	Helen Daniel	
1954	About Mrs. Leslie	Gilly	
1954	A Star Is Born	Susan Ettinger	
1954	The Adventures of Hajji Baba	Banah	
1954	Miss Robin Crusoe	Robin Crusoe	
1955	The Glass Slipper	Birdena	
1955	High Society	Clarissa Jones	
1988	The Boost	Barbara	
1988	B.O.R.N.	Rosie	

Television
Year	Title	Role	Notes
1952	Schlitz Playhouse of Stars		2 episodes
1953	Cavalcade of America	Nancy Hart	Episode: "Breakfast at Nancy's"
1954	Four Star Playhouse	Susan Pierce	Episode: "Vote of Confidence"
1955– 1974	Gunsmoke	Kitty Russell	425 episodes
1956	Alfred Hitchcock Presents	Carol Arlington	Season 1 Episode 26: "Whodunit"
1957	State Trooper	Betty Lavon-Coate	Episode: "Coate of Many Colors"
1957– 1963	The Red Skelton Show	Ruby	7 episodes
1958	Studio One	Joan Roberts	Episode: "Tide of Corruption"
1959	Steve Canyon	Molly McIntyre (uncredited)	Season 1/Episode 31: "Room 313"
1966	Clown Alley	Pickpocket Clown	CBS television film
1974	Betrayal	Helen Mercer	ABC Movie of the Week
1974	Match Game	Herself	Game show: one week/5 episodes
1974	Tattletales	Herself	Game show: one week/5 episodes with husband Frank
1976	The Quest	Miss Sally	Episode: "Day of Outrage"
1979	The Love Boat	Nora Knox	Episode: "The Oldies But Goodies..."
1982	The Best Little Special in Texas	Herself	TV movie documentary
1983	Hart to Hart	Big Sam	Episode: "The Wayward Hart"
1984	The Edge of Night	Dr. Juliana Stanhower	June 19–29, 1984
1986	Brothers	Carlotta	Episode: "A Penny a Dance"
1987	Gunsmoke: Return to Dodge	Kitty Russell	TV movie Including flashbacks to Gunsmoke episodes
1989	The New Dragnet	Mrs. Sylvia Wilson	Episode: "Nouveau Gypsies", (final appearance)
