= Matt Dillon (Gunsmoke) =

Fictional character in the US TV series

- Gunsmoke character
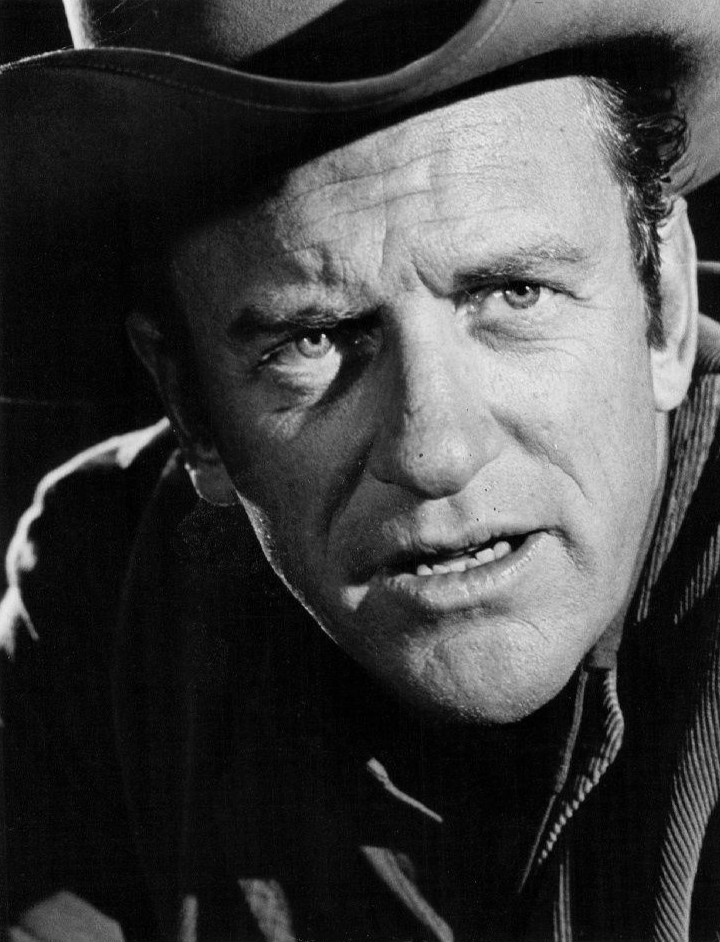
- James Arness as Matt Dillon in 1969
- Created by: Norman Macdonnell and John Meston
- Portrayed by: William Conrad (radio); James Arness (television)

In-universe information
- Gender: Male
- Occupation: U.S. Marshal
- Nationality: American

Matt Dillon is a fictional character featured on both the radio and television versions of Gunsmoke. He is the U.S. Marshal of Dodge City, Kansas, who works to preserve law and order in the western frontier of the 1870s. The character was created by writer John Meston. The character evolved considerably during nine years on CBS Radio and twenty years on CBS Television (Columbia Broadcasting System).

== Overview ==
William Conrad as Matt Dillon, circa 1952

Writer John Meston created Matt Dillon, "whose hair is probably red, if he's got any left. He'd be handsomer than he is if he had better manners but life and his enemies have left him looking a little beat up, and I suppose having seen his mother (back about 1840) trying to take a bath in a wooden washtub without fully undressing left his soul a little warped. Anyway, there'd have to be something wrong with him or he wouldn't have hired on as a United States Marshal in the heyday of Dodge City, Kansas."

On the radio series, which ran from 1952 until 1961, Matt was portrayed by William Conrad, whose deep and resonant voice helped to project a larger than life presence. In the opening of most radio episodes, the announcer would describe the show as "...the story of the violence that moved west with young America, and the story of a man who moved with it." Conrad's Matt would take over, saying, "I'm that man, Matt Dillon, United States Marshal – the first man they look for and the last they want to meet. It's a chancy job, and it makes a man watchful ... and a little lonely." Conrad's Matt provided bits of narration for many of the radio episodes, usually to help set the scene for the listener or to provide observations that assisted with character development. The radio episodes are a bit darker and more violent than the television episodes, and Conrad's Matt could sometimes be quick to anger and violence. He also struggled internally with the prevalence of violence and needless tragedies in his duties. In the radio version, Matt speaks of famous figures in the history of the American West, including later Dodge City personages Wyatt Earp and Billy the Kid, and Wild Bill Hickok was a close personal friend.

In the television version (which ran from 1955 until 1975), and subsequent TV-movies (1987 to 1994), Matt was portrayed by James Arness. Because most of the early television episodes were based on stories and scripts from the radio version, Arness's initial interpretation and portrayal were similar to those of William Conrad.

In 2013, Marshall Trimble, the board president of the Arizona Historical Society and vice president of the Wild West History Association, documented that Matt Dillon's TV character was shot at least 56 times, knocked unconscious 29 times, stabbed three times, and poisoned once.

In both the television and the radio versions, his closest friends were his assistant Chester, town physician "Doc" Adams, and saloon-keeper Kitty Russell. These three individuals were among Matt's few real friends because he knew that he could trust them in any situation. In the television version, Chester was succeeded by Festus Haggen (Ken Curtis). Festus was an uneducated member of a large and roguish family, but he was a savvy plainsman who ultimately became a badge-wearing Deputy U.S. Marshal (a position that always eluded Chester).

== Development ==
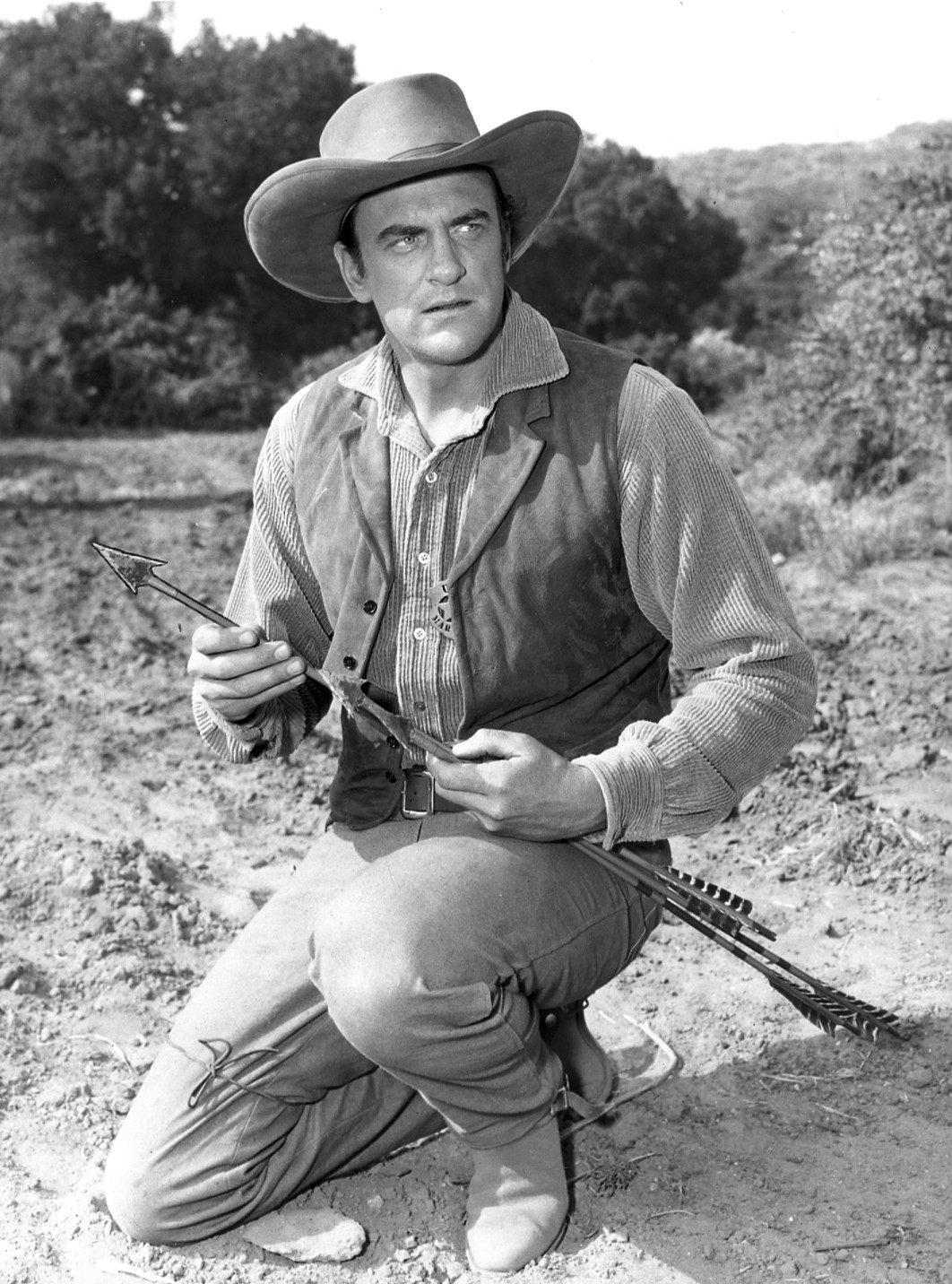
James Arness as Matt Dillon, 1956

In a 1949 audition show (or pilot) for the radio series, the character was named "Mark Dillon", but by 1952, when the regular series aired, the name had been changed to Matt Dillon. When the program came to television in 1955, the first episode was introduced by John Wayne in a brief film clip in which Wayne predicted that James Arness would become a major star. He went on to play the part for the next twenty years.

A popular story holds that Wayne himself had been offered the part and had turned it down. Charles Marquis Warren, who produced the first year of the television version of Gunsmoke and made the major casting decisions, stated that he had jokingly asked Wayne whether he would be interested in the part in a casual social setting. He added that Wayne had indicated that he had no interest whatsoever, as arguably the cinema's foremost box office attraction at the time. Warren stated that the inquiry had not been serious inasmuch as Wayne could not realistically have been expected to abandon a thriving movie career for a less certain and immensely less lucrative television role. Wayne did, however, recommend James Arness for the part and his offer to introduce the first episode was readily accepted by CBS.

Others who had auditioned for the part included Conrad, Raymond Burr, Richard Boone, and Denver Pyle. All would go on to other television successes. Conrad, in particular, would continue to portray Matt on the radio series until it ended in 1961. He would also go on to direct a number of television programs including two episodes of Gunsmoke.

== In popular culture ==
In some episodes of Gilligan's Island, Gilligan would dream that he was Matt Dillon in Dodge City, and the CBS Gunsmoke set was used, including the jail and Marshal's office. Gilligan's Island was later abruptly canceled to make room to restore Gunsmoke, which had just been canceled, to the schedule.

In an early episode of Have Gun – Will Travel, Paladin is vying for a job against another bounty hunter, who claims to have been Matt Dillon's deputy when Dillon was the marshal in Austin, Texas. Paladin calls the man a fraud, saying Dillon never served in Austin.

In Maverick, a character called Matt Pickle was Marshal of towns that the Maverick brothers ran through. One second-season episode was a full parody of a Gunsmoke episode.

In The Simpsons season 29 episode "Forgive and Regret" in the cold opening, Maggie Simpson has a gunfight with Marshal Matt Dillon, marking the show surpassing Gunsmoke as the longest-running scripted American primetime television series by number of episodes.

In the 1993 Toby Keith song "Should've Been a Cowboy", the singer references Marshal Dillon and Miss Kitty.
