= Gunsmoke season 10 =

Gunsmoke
- Season 10
- Starring: James Arness; Milburn Stone; Ken Curtis; Amanda Blake; Burt Reynolds
- No. of episodes: 36

Release
- Original network: CBS
- Original release: September 26, 1964 – May 29, 1965

Season chronology
- ← Previous; Season 9 Next → Season 11

The tenth season of the American Western television Gunsmoke originally aired in the United States on the CBS on September 26, 1964, and the final episode aired on June 29, 1965. Season 10 of Gunsmoke was the fourth season of one hour episodes filmed in black-and-white. Seasons 1–6 were half-hour episodes, and color episodes were not filmed until season 12.

== Synopsis ==
Gunsmoke is set in and around Dodge City, Kansas, in the post-Civil War era and centers on United States Marshal Matt Dillon (James Arness) as he enforces law and order in the city. In its original format, the series also focuses on Dillon's friendship with deputy Festus Haggen (Ken Curtis); Doctor Galen "Doc" Adams (Milburn Stone), the town's physician; and Kitty Russell (Amanda Blake), saloon girl and later owner of the Long Branch Saloon. Blacksmith Quint Asper (Burt Reynolds) was added to the cast in season eight and remained until the end of season ten. When Dennis Weaver left the series during season nine, he was replaced by Ken Curtis as Festus Haggen, who became deputy to Marshal Dillon.

== Cast and characters ==
=== Main ===
- James Arness as Matt Dillon
- Milburn Stone as Doc
- Amanda Blake as Kitty
- Glenn Strange as Sam Noonan
- Burt Reynolds as Quint Asper
- Ken Curtis as Festus

== Production ==
Season 10 consisted of 36 one hour black-and-white episodes produced by Norman Macdonnell (episodes 342–348, 350, 352, 361, 367) and Philip Leacock (episodes 349, 351, 353–360, 362–366, 368–377). Frank Paris was associate producer.

In this season, a new gunfight introduction is shown before the opening director/writer credits. Episode 4, "The Violators", is the first time Matt's gunfight scene is superimposed in the end credits.

=== Writing ===
Storylines would occasionally be taken from real-life events, but not always accurately. In episode 19, "Chief Joseph", it is mentioned that Chief Joseph met Ulysses S. Grant in Washington, D.C., when in actuality, he arrived in Washington, D.C. in January 1879 and met with President Rutherford B. Hayes and Congress. The real Chief Joseph was 38 years-old at the time of the visit and not the old man portrayed in the episode.

The final episode of season 10, episode 36, "He Who Steals", was the last John Meston script for the series.

=== Production design ===
New sets were designed in season 10. Episode 3, "Old Man", is the first time a trial is shown in an actual courtroom and not the Long Branch or Dodge House.

== Episodes ==
No. overall	No. in season	Title	Directed by	Written by	Original release date	Prod. code
342	1	"Blue Heaven"	Michael O'Herlihy	Les Crutchfield	September 26, 1964	0410
A wanted, on-the-run cowboy comes across a precocious, runaway boy and accompanies him to Dodge to find his impoverished mother. Cast : Kurt Russell (as Packy), Tim O'Connor (as Kip), Diane Ladd (as Elena), Karl Swenson (as Tabe), John McLiam (as Stableman), Eddie Hice (as Duster), Ernie Anderson (as Man) and Jan Merlin (as Ed Sykes)
343	2	"Crooked Mile"	Andrew V. McLaglen	Les Crutchfield	October 3, 1964	0401
An overprotective father disapproves of his daughter courting Quint and calls his cousin, an unsavory fixer of family matters. Cast : George Kennedy (as Cyrus), Royal Dano (as Praylie) and Katharine Ross (as Susan)
344	3	"Old Man"	Harry Harris	John Meston	October 10, 1964	0409
A loud distasteful old man threatens to kill a cowpoke in front of witnesses, making him the perfect patsy for a horse thief's murder plan. Cast : Ned Glass (as Old Man), Robert Hogan (as Danny), Ed Peck (as Silva), Rayford Barnes (as Litton), Howard Wendell (as Judge), Al Schottelkotte (as Bailiff), Gilman Rankin (as Waiter), Bryan O'Byrne (as Clerk), Harry Bartell (as Sheriff), Arthur Peterson (credited Arthur Peterson Jr. as Doctor), Robert Gravage (as Hangman) and Glenn Strange (as Sam)
345	4	"The Violators"	Harry Harris	John Dunkel	October 17, 1964	0413
Three friends who share a dark secret are being systematically targeted, and rattled Dodge citizens suspect Indian activity. Cast : Denver Pyle (as Caleb), James Anderson (as Hewitt), Michael Pate (as Buffalo Calf), Amzie Strickland (as Mrs. Hewitt), Garry Walberg (as Scroggs), Lee Phillip Bell (credited Lee Phillip as Mrs. Bell), Douglas Kennedy (as Talbot), Martin Blaine (as Colonel) and Arthur Batanides (as Harv Foster)
346	5	"Doctor's Wife"	Harry Harris	George Eckstein	October 24, 1964	0406
A new doctor arrives in Dodge and his meddlesome, underappreciating wife spreads malicious rumors about Doc to gain clientele. Cast : Phyllis Love (as Jennifer), James Broderick (as Wes), Harold Gould (as Boake), Anne Barton (credited Ann Barton as Mrs. Boake), Helen Kleeb (as Mrs. Gort), James Nusser (as Louie Pheeters), Robert Biheller (as Jared), Dorothea Neumann (credited Dorothy Neumann as Old Woman), Howard Culver (as Clerk), Jewel Jaffe (as Martha Lou), Buck Young (as Carney) and Glenn Strange (as Sam)
347	6	"Take Her, She's Cheap"	Harry Harris	Kathleen Hite	October 31, 1964	0411
A young girl enamored with Matt and his kindness in helping her stranded family, follows him to Dodge and is preyed upon by an evil predator. Cast : Lauri Peters (as Allie), Malcolm Atterbury (as Duggan), Linda Watkins (as Ma), Willard Sage (as Mel), Harry Dean Stanton (credited Dean Stanton as Rainey), Mort Mills (as Loren) and Ray Lane (as Man)
348	7	"Help Me, Kitty"	Harry Harris	Kathleen Hite	November 7, 1964	0414
Kitty's resilience is challenged when she accepts a young woman's plea for help which begins a life and death ordeal. Cast : Jack Elam (as Specter), Betty Conner (as Hope), James Frawley (as Furnas), Larry J. Blake (credited Larry Blake as Man), Joe Conley (as Carl), Burt Douglas (as Ed) and Peggy Stewart (as Nettie)
349	8	"Hung High"	Mark Rydell	John Meston	November 14, 1964	0416
Matt escorts a back-shooting coward to Hays City and is intercepted by the prisoner's gang whose leader originates a sinister plan to not only frame the Marshal but disgrace him as well. Cast : Robert Culp (as Joe), George Lindsey (as Bud), Elisha Cook Jr. (credited Elisha Cook as George), Michael Conrad (as Dick), Edward Asner (as Sgt. Wilks), Scott Marlowe (as Tony Serpa) and Harold J. Stone (as Jim Downey)
350	9	"Jonah Hutchinson"	Harry Harris	Calvin Clements, Sr.	November 21, 1964	0404
A bitter old man learns nothing after 30 years in prison and comes home to wreak havoc on family and neighbors. Cast : Robert F. Simon (as Jonah), Richard Anderson (as Samuel), June Dayton (as Phoebe), Tommy Alexander (as Franklin), Claude Johnson (as Aaron), David Macklin (as Steven), Roy Barcroft (as Roy), William Fawcett (as Lefferts), Charles Seel (as Gorth), Glenn Strange (as Sam), Rocky Shahan (as Stage Driver), Jacque Shelton (as 2nd Rancher) and Jason Johnson (as 1st Rancher)
351	10	"Big Man, Big Target"	Michael O'Herlihy	John Mantley	November 28, 1964	0417
An outlaw wrongly arrested by Matt wants payback and manipulates the farmer's wife he's having an affair with into his ambush plan. Cast : J.D. Cannon (as Pike), Harry Lauter (as Leach), John McLiam (as Delphos), Frank Ferguson (as Enoch), Glenn Strange (as Sam), Mike Road (as Joe Merchant) and Mariette Hartley (as Ellie)
352	11	"Chicken"	Andrew V. McLaglen	John Meston	December 5, 1964	0403
Hailed a hero, a gun-shy cowboy earns an undeserved reputation, and falls hard for a young woman who's hiding her own secret. Cast : Glenn Corbett (as Dan), Gigi Perreau (as Lucy), John Lupton (as Carl), L.Q. Jones (as Brady), Lane Chandler (as Morgan), Dave Willock (as Becker), Lane Bradford (as Davis), Chubby Johnson (as Rogers), Roy Barcroft (as Roy), Michael Keep (as Willis), John Pickard (as Phelps) and Bob Steele (as Coe)
353	12	"Innocence"	Harry Harris	John Meston	December 12, 1964	0418
Two rowdy drifters fight for the affections of the new Long Branch saloon girl and when she's found dead, Matt must determine which one's responsible. Cast : Bethel Leslie (as Elsa Poe), Jason Evers (as Charlie Ross), Michael Forest (as Bob Sullins), Jacque Shelton (as Joe Rogers), Lee Krieger (as Carl Beck), Ric Roman (as Sims), Don Brice (as Cowboy #1) and Claude Akins (as Art McLane)
354	13	"Aunt Thede"	Sutton Roley	Kathleen Hite	December 19, 1964	0412
Festus' Aunt Thede comes to Dodge for a visit and in typical Haggen fashion becomes involved in a local family's drama. Cast : Jeanette Nolan (as Aunt Thede), Dyan Cannon (as Ivy), Frank Cady (as Webb), James Stacy (as George), Howard McNear (as Howard), Hap Glaudi (as Townsman) and Jenny Lee Arness (credited Jenny Lee Aurness as Laurie)
355	14	"Hammerhead"	Christian Nyby	Antony Ellis	December 26, 1964	0408
When a wealthy rancher comes to Dodge to buy horses, two rival stable owners agree to a high-stakes long-distance race to demonstrate the speed and durability of their breeds. Cast : John Fiedler (as Fitch), Arch Johnson (as Ponder), Linda Foster (as Carrie), Chubby Johnson (as Wohaw), Donald Briggs (credited Don Briggs as Deggers), William Henry (as Feeney), Peter Dunn (as Squatty), Tom Richards (credited Tommy Richards as Gambler), Ray Hemphill (as Tom), Gene Redfern (as Gambler), Bill Catching (as Stomp), Dan White (credited Daniel M. White as Attendant) and Chuck Hayward (as Cowhand)
356	15	"Double Entry"	Joseph Sargent	Les Crutchfield	January 2, 1965	0419
Matt's friend from Texas arrives in Dodge with interests to buy the stagecoach line, but eyebrows raise when he's seen colluding with a local hooligan. Cast : Forrest Tucker (as Brad McClain), Mel Gallagher (as Yuma Joe), Roy Roberts (as Mr. Botkin), Nora Marlowe (as Passenger), Lew Brown (as Pete Elder), Glenn Strange (as Sam), Fred Coby (as Wagoneer), Rudy Sooter (as Fiddler) and Cyril Delevanti (as Jake Bookly)
357	16	"Run, Sheep, Run"	Harry Harris	John Meston	January 9, 1965	0420
Believing he killed the man that swindled him, a young rancher with his wife flees from the law and digs himself into a deeper hole. Cast : Burt Brinckerhoff (as Tom Stocker), James Nusser (as Louie Pheeters), Tom Fadden (as Lem Hubley), Ted Knight (as Bill Miller), Anne Barton (credited Ann Barton as Beth Miller), Arthur Malet (as Cox), George Keymas (as Harry Crane), Davey Davison (as Mary Stocker) and Peter Whitney (as Dan Braden)
358	17	"Deputy Festus"	Harry Harris	Calvin Clements, Sr.	January 16, 1965	0422
Festus finds himself in quite a quandary when Matt asks him to watch-over the jail and he learns that the three disorderly drunks being held are his cousins. Cast : Don Beddoe (as Halligan), Shug Fisher (as Emery), Bill Zuckert (as Mr. Jacobsen), Michael Petit (as Glen), Royal Dano (as Lambert), Carl Reindel (as Dave Carson), Denver Pyle (as Claudius), Ken Mayer (as Tiplett), Glenn Strange (as Sam) and Harold Ensley (as Waiter)
359	18	"One Killer on Ice"	Joseph H. Lewis	Richard Carr	January 23, 1965	0421
A bounty hunter tells Matt that he has a wanted outlaw holed-up with his partner in a secured location and needs his help in bringing him in, but the real twist is what he's not telling him. Cast : John Drew Barrymore (as Anderson), Richard Carlyle (as Carl), Glenn Strange (as Sam), Eddie Hice (as Frank), Dennis Hopper (as Billy Kimbo), Anne Helm (as Helena Dales) and Philip Coolidge (as Owney Dales)
360	19	"Chief Joseph"	Mark Rydell	Story by : Thomas Warner; Teleplay by : Clyde Ware	January 30, 1965	0424
A seriously ill Nez Perce Indian chief causes hostility among the town's residents when he shelters in the Dodge House, but one man sees it as an opportunity to avenge his brother's death. Cast : Victor Jory (as Chief Joseph), Robert Loggia (as Lt. Cal Tripp), Michael Keep (as Yellow Bear), Dennis Cross (as Three Hand), Leonard Stone (as Mr. Wiley), Howard Culver (as Clerk), Joe Maross (as Charlie Britton) and Willard Sage (as Corly Watts)
361	20	"Circus Trick"	William F. Claxton	Les Crutchfield	February 6, 1965	0407
The town is abuzz when the circus comes to town promising many thrilling performances, but Matt suspects all the action will happen behind the scenes. Cast : Walter Burke (as Elko), Elizabeth MacRae (as April), Warren Oates (as Speeler), Isabel Jewell (credited Isabel Jewel as Madame Ahr), Ken Scott (as Eddie), Roy Roberts (as Mr. Botkin), Roy Barcroft (as Roy) and Glenn Strange (as Sam)
362	21	"Song for Dying"	Allen Reisner	Harry Kronman	February 13, 1965	0425
Blind with rage, an ill-tempered man tracks the drunken ex-doctor to Dodge who he blames for the death of his wife. Cast : Theodore Bikel (as Martin Kellums), Roger Ewing (as Ben Lukens). Lee Majors (as Dave Lukens), Russell Thorson (as Mace), Sheldon Allman (as Cory Lukens), Glenn Strange (as Sam), Robert F. Simon (as Will Lukens) and Ford Rainey (as Hode Embry)
363	22	"Winner Take All"	Vincent McEveety	Les Crutchfield	February 20, 1965	0415
A lack of respect and a manipulating saloon girl erode the contentious relationship between two brothers. Cast : Tom Simcox (as Curly), John Milford (as Pinto), Margaret Blye (credited Margaret Bly as Karen), H.M. Wynant (as Relko), Allen Jaffe (as Gunman), Ralph J. Rowe (as Stableman) and Nestor Paiva (as Barman)
364	23	"Eliab's Aim"	Richard C. Sarafian	Will Corry	February 27, 1965	0423
Festus' nephew Eliab comes to town to settle a "duty of honor", by shooting Festus' right ear off, but just the little hanging down part. Cast : James Hampton (credited Jim Hampton as Eliab Haggen), Don O'Kelly (credited Donald O'Kelly as Dealer), Gregg Palmer (as Jake Craig), Glenn Strange (as Sam), Hank Patterson (as Hank), Larry Barton (as Citizen) and Dee J. Thompson (as Widow Pearl Winton)
365	24	"Thursday's Child"	Joseph H. Lewis	Robert Lewin	March 6, 1965	0426
Kitty's friend passes through town on her way to witness the birth of her grandson and a smitten Doc is kidnapped to help in the delivery. Cast : Jean Arthur (as Julie Blane), Joe Raciti (as Vardis), Roy Barcroft (as Roy), Hank Patterson (as Hank), Suzanne Benoit (as Amy Blane), Glenn Strange (as Sam), Fred Coby (as Clint Marston) and Scott Marlowe (as Lon Blane)
366	25	"Breckinridge"	Vincent McEveety	Les Crutchfield	March 13, 1965	0427
A young lawyer comes to town and immediately becomes a thorn in Matt's side, but his first client proves how things should be done in Dodge. Cast : John Warburton (as Judge Danby), Elisha Cook Jr. (credited Elisha Cook as Jocko Beal), Glenn Strange (as Sam), Hank Patterson (as Hank), Harry Harvey Sr. (as Old Man), Dorothea Neumann (credited Dorothy Neumann as Woman), Howard Culver (as Hotel Clerk), Jack Perkins (as Bully), Ben Cooper (as Breck Taylor) and Robert Sorrells (as Sled Grady)
367	26	"Bank Baby"	Andrew V. McLaglen	John Meston	March 20, 1965	0405
An oaf of a man concocts a peculiar plan to rob the bank, but first he must kidnap a baby as cover to his story. Cast : Jacques Aubuchon (as Bert), Gail Kobe (as Grace), Virginia Christine (as Bess), Hampton Fancher (as Milton), Roy Roberts (as Mr. Botkin), Harry Carey Jr. (as Fisher), William Boyett (as Harry) and Cliff Ketchum (as Teller)
368	27	"The Lady"	Mark Rydell	John Mantley	March 27, 1965	0430
An elderly woman traveling with her niece stopover in Dodge where she falls in love with a local rancher, but the niece goes to great lengths to quash the relationship. Cast : Eileen Heckart (as Hattie Silks), Walter Sande (as Charlie), Hank Patterson (as Hank), Glenn Strange (as Sam), James Nusser (as Louie Pheeters), Clifton James (as Sam Hare), Michael Forest (as Ray Pate), R.G. Armstrong (as Jud Briar) and Katharine Ross (as Liz Beaumont)
369	28	"Dry Road to Nowhere"	Vincent McEveety	Harry Kronman	April 3, 1965	0429
A temperance preacher wants to end drinking in Dodge, but his high-handed behavior makes more enemies than friends. Cast : James Whitmore (as Amos Campbell), Read Morgan (as Pete Moreland), James Nusser (as Louie Pheeters), Glenn Strange (as Sam), Howard Culver (as Howie), John Saxon (as Dingo), Julie Sommars (as Bess Campbell) and L. Q. Jones (as Wally)
370	29	"Twenty Miles from Dodge"	Mark Rydell	Clyde Ware	April 10, 1965	0428
Kitty and her fellow stagecoach passengers are abducted and held for ransom by a gang of outlaws. Cast : Darren McGavin (as Will Helmick), Everett Sloane (as Follansbee), Aneta Corsaut (as Eleanor Starkey), Tony Haig (as Johnny Hutton), Stafford Repp (as Otie Schaffer), William Fawcett (as Bert Fraley), Noam Pitlik (as Dobbs), Gerald S. O'Loughlin (as Grant Shay) and Val Avery (as Dorner)
371	30	"The Pariah"	Harry Harris	Calvin Clements, Sr.	April 17, 1965	0432
An Italian immigrant becomes a social pariah after his story on how he shot a wanted man is misconstrued. Cast : John Dehner (as Paolo Scanzano), Steve Ihnat (as Ben Hooker), Tom Reese (as Wayne Hooker), Lee Van Cleef (as John Hooker), Don Keefer (as Newspaper Editor), Glenn Strange (as Sam), Donald Losby (as Thomas Scanzano) and Ilka Windish (as Rosita Scanzano)
372	31	"Gilt Guilt"	Harry Harris	Kathleen Hite	April 24, 1965	0402
Drought hits Dodge causing widespread crop failure and Doc must deal with its aftermath, scurvy. Cast : Jan Clayton (as Mary), Andrew Duggan (as Crail), Peter Brooks (as Sully), William Phipps (as Drifter), William Boyett (as Jake), James Nusser (as Louie Pheeters) and Roy Barcroft (as Roy)
373	32	"Bad Lady from Brookline"	Michael O'Herlihy	Gustave Field	May 1, 1965	0431
A headstrong woman is given false facts on her husband died and seeks revenge against Matt. Cast : Betty Hutton (as Molly McConnell), John Hubbard (as LaFarge), Jonathan Kidd (as Harper), Billy Bowles (as Willie McConnell), Ollie O'Toole (as Herb), Jan Peters (as Curley), Glenn Strange (as Sam), Eddie Hice (as Cowboy), Tom McCauley (as Ben) and Claude Akins (as Sy Sherne)
374	33	"Two Tall Men"	Vincent McEveety	Frank Q. Dobbs & Robert Stewart, Jr.	May 8, 1965	0436
An old buffalo hunter comes upon two cowpokes hovering over an unconscious Doc and his story on how he saved him grows wilder every time he repeats it. Cast : Harry Townes (as Abihu Howell), Jay Ripley (as Ned), Maurice McEndree (as Newspaperman), Preston Pierce (as Tommy), Glenn Strange (as Sam), Ben Cooper (as Breck) and George Lindsey (as Billy)
375	34	"Honey Pot"	Harry Harris	John Meston	May 15, 1965	0434
Matt resigns as Marshal when he realizes that his good friend is involved in the murder of the new saloon girl's husband. Cast : Rory Calhoun (as Ben Stack), Dick Wessel (as Sol Durham), John Crawford (as Hal Biggs), Harry Bartell (as James Riley), Harry Lauter (as Gregory Bellow), Hank Patterson (as Hank), Roy Barcroft (as Roy), Charles Maxwell (as Hy Evers), Glenn Strange (as Sam) and Joanna Moore (as Honey Dare)
376	35	"The New Society"	Joseph Sargent	Calvin Clements, Sr.	May 22, 1965	0451
Matt faces mass hostility in Ridge Town where the townspeople conspire to cover-up a 12-year-old murder case. Cast : James Gregory (as Scanlon, Sr.), Richard X. Slattery (as Coor), Sandy Kenyon (as Bennings), Lew Brown (as Eli Wall), Ian Wolfe (as Old Man Wall), Elizabeth Perry (as Vera Scanlon), Dennis Cross (as Aaron), Garry Walberg (as Roy), Victor Izay (as Depositor), Fred Coby (as Sy), Linda James (as Sue Ann), Jeremy Slate (as Tom Scanlon) and Jack Weston (as Wesley)
377	36	"He Who Steals"	Harry Harris	John Meston	May 29, 1965	0435
A young ranch hand respects an old buffalo hunter but learns a valuable lesson, there's no honor among thieves. Cast : Russ Tamblyn (as Billy Waters), Roger Torrey (as Steve Hays), Lane Bradford (as Dan O'Hare), Will J. White (as Beckett), James Nusser (as Louie Pheeters), Glenn Strange (as Sam), Harold J. Stone (as Jeff Sutro), Len Wayland (as Jim Donner), Larry Ward (as Sid Perce) and Stanley Adams (as Charlie Rath)

== Release ==
=== Broadcast ===
Season ten aired Saturdays at 10:00-11:00 pm (EST) on CBS.

=== Home media ===
The tenth season was released on DVD by Paramount Home Entertainment in a two volume set on August 12, 2014.

== Reception ==
Gunsmoke season 10 finished at number 27 in the Nielsen ratings.
