= Gunsmoke season 11 =

Gunsmoke
- Season 11
- Starring: James Arness; Ken Curtis; Milburn Stone; Amanda Blake; Roger Ewing
- No. of episodes: 32

Release
- Original network: CBS
- Original release: September 18, 1965 – May 7, 1966

Season chronology
- ← Previous; Season 10 Next → Season 12

Gunsmoke is an American Western television series developed by Charles Marquis Warren and based on the radio program of the same name. The series ran for 20 seasons, making it the longest-running Western in television history.

The first episode of season 11 aired in the United States on September 18, 1965, and the final episode aired on May 7, 1966. All episodes were broadcast in the U.S. by CBS.

Season 11 of Gunsmoke was the fifth season of one-hour episodes, and the last season filmed in black-and-white. Seasons 1–6 were half-hour episodes, and color episodes were not filmed until season 12.

== Synopsis ==
Gunsmoke is set in and around Dodge City, Kansas, in the post-Civil War era and centers on United States Marshal Matt Dillon (James Arness) as he enforces law and order in the city. In its original format, the series also focuses on Dillon's friendship with deputy Festus Haggen (Ken Curtis); Doctor Galen "Doc" Adams (Milburn Stone), the town's physician; and Kitty Russell (Amanda Blake), saloon girl and later owner of the Long Branch Saloon. Deputy Clayton Thaddeus Greenwood (Roger Ewing) was added to the cast in season 11.

== Cast and characters ==
=== Main ===
- James Arness as Matt Dillon
- Milburn Stone as Doc
- Amanda Blake as Kitty
- Glenn Strange as Sam Noonan
- Ken Curtis as Festus
- Roger Ewing as Thad

== Production ==
Season 11 consisted of 32 one hour black-and-white episodes produced by Philip Leacock and associate producer John Mantley.

=== Writing ===
Occasionally, titles were reused. Episode 25, "The Brothers", is the first of two episodes named "The Brothers" along with the second from season 18 (formerly "Incident at Sayville Junction").

=== Filming ===
Filming occasionally included B-roll footage, reused in other episodes. Episode 30, "My Father, My Son", is such an example. Just before the end scene in the Long Branch, a wet street scene shows the Dodge House with horses tied at railings and people crossing the street in both directions. This scene has been shown in several episodes as filler or as a transitional scene.

Episode 32, "Prime of Life", was the final black-and-white episode.

=== Music ===
Episodes 18 and 19, "The Raid" parts 1 and 2, were scored by Franz Waxman.

== Episodes ==
No. overall	No. in season	Title	Directed by	Written by	Original release date	Prod. code
378	1	"Seven Hours to Dawn"	Vincent McEveety	Clyde Ware	September 18, 1965	0433
A treacherous gang of outlaws take over Dodge. Cast: John Drew Barrymore (Mace Gore), Michael Vandever (Raider), Al Lettier (Smitty), Allen Jaffe (Jack Dawn), Charles Seel (Barney), Morgan Woodward (Deeks), Jerry Douglas (Clark) and Johnny Seven (actor) (Barens)
379	2	"The Storm"	Joseph Sargent	Paul Savage	September 25, 1965	0456
A buffalo hunter is sentenced to be hanged for a murder he did not commit, the real culprits being the sons of Matt's old friend Adam Benteen. Cast: Forrest Tucker (Adam Benteen), Kelly Thordsen (Mel Woodley), Richard Evans (Ab Benteen), Tim McIntire (Claude Benteen), Mary Lou Taylor (Hope Woodley), Stuart Margolin (Sheriff), Charles Seel (Barney)
380	3	"Clayton Thaddeus Greenwood"	Joseph Sargent	Calvin Clements, Sr.	October 2, 1965	0454
Thad Greenwood trails the four tough guys who caused his father to suffer a fatal heart attack. Cast: Jack Elam (Sam Band), Roger Ewing (Thad Greenwood), Allen Jaffe (Webster), Paul Fix (Thad Greenwood, Sr.), Sherwood Price (Frank Band), Robert Sorrells (Zachary), William Henry (Waiter)
381	4	"Ten Little Indians"	Mark Rydell	George Eckstein	October 9, 1965	0452
Matt must find out who hired the gunfighters that he has been facing in and out of Dodge.
382	5	"Taps for Old Jeb"	James Sheldon	Les Crutchfield	October 16, 1965	0463
Prospector Jeb Carter hires a bodyguard to protect his gold after years of searching finally pay off.
383	6	"Kioga"	Harry Harris	Robert Lewin	October 23, 1965	0453
Kioga, a young and wounded Pawnee Indian, comes to Dodge City to hunt down the fur trader who killed his father and attacked his sister.
384	7	"The Bounty Hunter"	Harry Harris	Paul Savage	October 30, 1965	0457
Bounty hunter Luke Frazer is drawn out of retirement to find the man who murdered a rich rancher's son.
385	8	"The Reward"	Marc Daniels	Gilbert Ralston, Scott Hunt & Beth Keele	November 6, 1965	0462
A convicted gold-mine swindler gets out of prison to resume mining with the money he is accused of stealing.
386	9	"Malachi"	Gary Nelson	William Putman	November 13, 1965	0461
Town drunk Malachi Harper poses as marshal just to impress his brother.
387	10	"The Pretender"	Vincent McEveety	Calvin Clements, Sr.	November 20, 1965	0465
The Dano brothers return home from prison to a dying mother and a bitter father.
388	11	"South Wind"	Allen Reisner	Jack Bartlett	November 27, 1965	0460
A 12-year-old boy goes into hiding after witnessing his father's murder.
389	12	"The Hostage"	Vincent McEveety	Story by : Joe Ann Johnson; Teleplay by : Clyde Ware	December 4, 1965	0455
Four convicts take Matt hostage on their way to Mexico.
390	13	"Outlaw's Woman"	Mark Rydell	Clyde Ware	December 11, 1965	0468
Matt is surprised to see that the fleeing train robber he shot is a woman.
391	14	"The Avengers"	Vincent McEveety	Donn Mullally	December 18, 1965	0467
A judge and his two sons plot their revenge when they suspect Festus and Kitty of murdering a member of their family.
392	15	"Gold Mine"	Abner Biberman	Scott Hunt & Beth Keele	December 25, 1965	0464
Kitty travels alone to the rough mining town of Pickaxe to claim a gold mine, meeting the eccentric Gibbijohn family and a deaf-mute boy.
393	16	"Death Watch"	Mark Rydell	Calvin Clements, Sr.	January 8, 1966	0466
Matt attempts to protect wounded outlaw Johnny Drago from a pair of bounty hunters.
394	17	"Sweet Billy, Singer of Songs"	Alvin Ganzer	Gustave Field	January 15, 1966	0469
Festus' nephew Billy comes to Dodge to find a wife.
395	18	"The Raid"	Vincent McEveety	Clyde Ware	January 22, 1966	0458
396	19	"The Raid"	Vincent McEveety	Clyde Ware	January 29, 1966	0459
A band out of outlaws terrorize Dodge. In Part 2, the outlaws take Doc hostage after they rob the bank and set Dodge on fire.
397	20	"Killer at Large"	Marc Daniels	Calvin Clements, Sr.	February 5, 1966	0471
Festus flees Dodge after killing a medicine-show sharpshooter in a gunfight.
398	21	"My Father's Guitar"	Robert Totten	Hal Sitowitz	February 12, 1966	0474
A wandering guitarist believes his father's guitar is more valuable than a person's life.
399	22	"Wishbone"	Marc Daniels	Paul Savage	February 19, 1966	0473
Matt goes after three bandits who robbed a stagecoach and killed the driver and guard.
400	23	"Sanctuary"	Harry Harris	Calvin Clements, Sr.	February 26, 1966	0472
A bank robber takes refuge in a church where he holds the pastor and two women hostage.
401	24	"Honor Before Justice"	Harry Harris	Story by : Frank Q. Dobbs & Robert Stewart, Jr. Screenplay by : Frank Q. Dobbs	March 5, 1966	0475
John Two-Bears is sentenced to death by the Osage Council for a murder he did not commit.
402	25	"The Brothers"	Tay Garnett	Tom Hanley	March 12, 1966	0470
Matt captures a young criminal named Billy after a robbery goes wrong, who must endure Matt's moralizing while waiting to be broken out of jail by his outlaw brother and hero Ed.
403	26	"Which Doctor"	Peter Graves	Les Crutchfield	March 19, 1966	0476
Buffalo hunters kidnap Doc and Festus.
404	27	"Harvest"	Harry Harris	Les Crutchfield	March 26, 1966	0477
Ben Payson's daughter Betsy falls in love with one of the Scottish homesteaders who have threatened to take her family's land.
405	28	"By Line"	Allen Reisner	Les Crutchfield	April 9, 1966	0479
Despite his illiteracy, Festus becomes a reporter for Dodge's newspaper, The Dodge City Clarion.
406	29	"Treasure of John Walking Fox"	Marc Daniels	Story by : Leo Bagby; Teleplay by : Clyde Ware	April 16, 1966	0480
John Walking Fox's $50 gold piece starts gold fever in Dodge City and makes the man a target of robbers.
407	30	"My Father, My Son"	Robert Totten	Hal Sitowitz	April 23, 1966	0478
Fast gunman Jim Barrett kills a man in self-defense. Now the dead man's father and his brothers are gunning for him.
408	31	"Parson Comes to Town"	Marc Daniels	Verne Jay	April 30, 1966	0482
A stranger wearing a murdered preacher's coat causes tension in Dodge when he announces his intention to watch someone die.
409	32	"Prime of Life"	Robert Totten	Daniel B. Ullman	May 7, 1966	0481
Young Kyle Stoner is a fast gun involved with a pair of thieves who beat up Festus.

== Release ==
=== Broadcast ===
Season 11 aired Saturdays at 10:00-11:00 pm (EST) on CBS.

=== Home media ===
The 11th season was released on DVD by Paramount Home Entertainment in a two-volume set on December 2, 2014.

== Reception ==
Gunsmoke season 11 finished at number 30 in the Nielsen ratings.

=== Awards and nominations ===
Award	Year (Note: Indicates the year of ceremony.)	Category	Nominee(s) / Work	Result	Ref(s)
Primetime Emmy Awards	1966	Individual Achievements in Music - Composition	Morton Stevens for "Seven Hours to Dawn"	Nominated	
