= Gunsmoke season 9 =

Gunsmoke
- Season 9
- Starring: James Arness; Dennis Weaver; Milburn Stone; Amanda Blake; Ken Curtis; Burt Reynolds
- No. of episodes: 36

Release
- Original network: CBS
- Original release: September 28, 1963 – June 6, 1964

Season chronology
- ← Previous; Season 8 Next → Season 10

Gunsmoke is an American Western television series developed by Charles Marquis Warren and based on the radio program of the same name. The series ran for 20 seasons, making it the longest-running Western in television history.

The first episode of season 9 aired in the United States on September 28, 1963, and the final episode aired on June 6, 1964. All episodes were broadcast in the U.S. by CBS.

Season 9 of Gunsmoke was the third season of one-hour episodes filmed in black-and-white. Seasons 1–6 were half-hour episodes, and color episodes were not filmed until season 12.

== Synopsis ==
Gunsmoke is set in and around Dodge City, Kansas, in the post-Civil War era and centers on United States Marshal Matt Dillon (James Arness) as he enforces law and order in the city. In its original format, the series also focuses on Dillon's friendship with three other citizens of Dodge City: Doctor Galen "Doc" Adams (Milburn Stone), the town's physician; Kitty Russell (Amanda Blake), saloon girl and later owner of the Long Branch Saloon; and Chester Goode (Dennis Weaver), Dillon's assistant. In season eight, a fifth regular character was added to the cast: blacksmith Quint Asper (Burt Reynolds), who remained until the end of season ten. Dennis Weaver left the series during season nine and was replaced by Ken Curtis as Festus Haggen, who became deputy to Marshal Dillon.

== Cast and characters ==
=== Main ===
- James Arness as Matt Dillon
- Dennis Weaver as Chester
- Milburn Stone as Doc
- Amanda Blake as Kitty
- Glenn Strange as Sam Noonan
- Burt Reynolds as Quint Asper

== Production ==
Season 9 consisted of 36 one hour black-and-white episodes produced by Norman Macdonnell and Frank Paris as associate producer.

=== Casting ===
Season 9 incorporated a number of casting changes. It introduced Burt Reynolds as regular character Quint Asper. Dennis Weaver left the series after episode 28, "Bently", and his role as Chester was replaced by Ken Curtis as Festus, although Curtis also appears in early in the season as another character in episode 2. The last credits of recurring character Moss Grimmick (George Selk) was in episode 26, "Caleb".ix appearances in the series.

Episode 10, "Extradition (part 1)" marks the first time a special guest star's name is included in the opening credits.

John Newman is the first black actor to be listed in the closing credits on a Gunsmoke episode, in episode 30, "The Promoter".

=== Writing ===
Occasionally, titles were re-used. Season 9 included two such episodes: episode 16, "Prairie Wolfer" was also the title of season 13, episode 10; and episode 34, "Homecoming" was also the title of season 18, episode 16.

== Episodes ==
| No. overall | No. in season | Title | Directed by | Written by | Original release date | Prod. code |
|---|---|---|---|---|---|---|
| 306 | 1 | "Kate Heller" | Harry Harris | Kathleen Hite | September 28, 1963 | 7102 |
An elderly woman running a stagecoach relay station tends to a seriously wounded Matt and remains remarkably strong and resilient when she realizes who shot the Marshal.
| 307 | 2 | "Lover Boy" | Andrew V. McLaglen | John Meston | October 5, 1963 | 7107 |
A charming ladies' man with a history of jilting women romances the young wife of an elderly rancher and convinces her to embrace a disturbing plan to alibi his killing and free her from her marriage.
| 308 | 3 | "Legends Don't Sleep" | Harry Harris | Kathleen Hite | October 12, 1963 | 7106 |
An infamous gunman returns to his aunt's home after five years in prison and yearns to go straight but he meets resistance when he's run-ragged by those who know of his reputation.
| 309 | 4 | "Tobe" | John English | Paul Savage | October 19, 1963 | 7109 |
A decent hard-working farmer troubles multiply after he loses his land and then falls in love with the new saloon girl whose troubled past shatters his life.
| 310 | 5 | "Easy Come" | Andrew V. McLaglen | John Meston | October 26, 1963 | 7103 |
An unsuspecting and mild-mannered cowboy transforms into a violent psychopath with no conscience as he commits one heinous act after another.
| 311 | 6 | "My Sister's Keeper" | Harry Harris | Kathleen Hite | November 2, 1963 | 7110 |
An overbearing sister is extremely obsessed in controlling her younger sibling's life.
| 312 | 7 | "Quint's Trail" | Harry Harris | Kathleen Hite | November 9, 1963 | 7112 |
Quint escorts a desperate family by wagon to North Platte and uncovers their hurried reason in leaving Illinois.
| 313 | 8 | "Carter Caper" | Jerry Hopper | John Meston | November 16, 1963 | 7111 |
A cowardly horse thief spreads a vengeful rumor against the cowboy who roughed him up.
| 314 | 9 | "Ex-Con" | Thomas Carr | John Meston | November 30, 1963 | 7117 |
Matt awakens from a feverish coma in an abandoned cabin with the body of an ex-con he jailed five years prior and no recollection of the events that transpired.
| 315 | 10 | "Extradition" | John English | Antony Ellis | December 7, 1963 | 7115 |
| 316 | 11 | "Extradition" | John English | Antony Ellis | December 14, 1963 | 7116 |
Part 1: Matt tracks a wanted murderer into Mexico and is obliged to take a corrupt Mexican Army Lieutenant as his escort. Part 2: With his prisoner finally secured, Matt faces more obstacles reaching the Texas border.
| 317 | 12 | "The Magician" | Harry Harris | John A. Kneubuhl | December 21, 1963 | 7104 |
The daughter of a traveling medicine man is savagely attacked by a local rancher's bad seed, and neither are willing to identify him.
| 318 | 13 | "Pa Hack's Brood" | Jerry Hopper | Paul Savage | December 28, 1963 | 7108 |
A despicable two-faced father uses his children as pawns in a plan to acquire a peaceful man's farm.
| 319 | 14 | "The Glory and the Mud" | Jerry Hopper | Gwen Bagni | January 4, 1964 | 7113 |
An aging lawman comes to Dodge in hopes to rekindle an old romance and is stalked by a young man who has a warped view on earning a reputation.
| 320 | 15 | "Dry Well" | Harry Harris | John Meston | January 11, 1964 | 7120 |
Quint witnesses a murder and is held captive by a desperate father, who's trying to save his suspected son from the killing.
| 321 | 16 | "Prairie Wolfer" | Andrew V. McLaglen | John Dunkel | January 18, 1964 | 7119 |
Festus is hired as a prairie wolfer by the local cattle association when several cows go missing but ends-up being framed for the crime.
| 322 | 17 | "Friend" | Harry Harris | Kathleen Hite | January 25, 1964 | 7122 |
Matt travels to the small town of Friend, Kansas to investigate the strange death of a buddy who once saved his life.
| 323 | 18 | "Once a Haggen" | Andrew V. McLaglen | Les Crutchfield | February 1, 1964 | 7118 |
Festus frantically tries to save his friend from hanging for a murder that occurred while both of them were in a drunken stupor.
| 324 | 19 | "No Hands" | Andrew V. McLaglen | John Meston | February 8, 1964 | 7101 |
A cruel, merciless prairie family torments and maims a beloved Dodge citizen and when Matt doesn't arrest them, providence metes-out its own form of justice.
| 325 | 20 | "Mayblossom" | Andrew V. McLaglen | Kathleen Hite | February 15, 1964 | 7123 |
Festus' cousin comes to town to marry him because of a pact between their fathers and when she's assaulted, Festus seeks revenge.
| 326 | 21 | "The Bassops" | Andrew V. McLaglen | Tom Hanley | February 22, 1964 | 7121 |
A California bound family finds both Matt and his prisoner unconscious and handcuffed to one another, but the captive comes to first claiming to be the marshal.
| 327 | 22 | "The Kite" | Andrew V. McLaglen | John Meston | February 29, 1964 | 7124 |
Festus cares for a young girl who saw her mother's murderer and when the killer learns there was a witness, he returns to finish the job.
| 328 | 23 | "Comanches Is Soft" | Harry Harris | Kathleen Hite | March 7, 1964 | 7126 |
Festus and Quint one-up each other all the way to Wichita, where they meet a saloon girl who has a habit of running-off with strangers.
| 329 | 24 | "Father's Love" | Harry Harris | John Meston | March 14, 1964 | 7125 |
A love-struck rancher marries a beautiful ex-saloon girl, but the groom's depraved uncle also desires her, and attempts to frame his nephew for murder.
| 330 | 25 | "Now That April's Here" | Andrew V. McLaglen | Les Crutchfield | March 21, 1964 | 7127 |
The only ones who believe Festus' girlfriend of witnessing a murder are the killers themselves.
| 331 | 26 | "Caleb" | Harry Harris | Paul Savage | March 28, 1964 | 7128 |
A failed farmer comes to Dodge in search of a meaningful life but finds himself on the wrong side of an avenging brother.
| 332 | 27 | "Owney Tupper Had a Daughter" | Jerry Hopper | Paul Savage | April 4, 1964 | 7105 |
An elderly widower must overcome several costly hurdles and change his once complacent lifestyle in order to gain back custody of his young daughter.
| 333 | 28 | "Bently" | Harry Harris | John Kneubuhl | April 11, 1964 | 7114 |
Chester doubts a man's deathbed murder confession and sets out to find the real killer but stirs-up serious trouble asking too many questions.
| 334 | 29 | "Kitty Cornered" | John Brahm | Kathleen Hite | April 18, 1964 | 7131 |
Kitty is being squeezed out of business and her competition comes in the form of a beautiful brunette whirlwind.
| 335 | 30 | "The Promoter" | Andrew V. McLaglen | John Meston | April 25, 1964 | 7129 |
A local rancher grows tired of farming and comes to Dodge looking for the next get rich scheme, and stumbles upon boxing promoter to make his fortune.
| 336 | 31 | "Trip West" | Harry Harris | John Dunkel | May 2, 1964 | 7132 |
A timid bank clerk goes through a surprising change in personality when he is told he only has a short time to live.
| 337 | 32 | "Scot Free" | Harry Harris | Kathleen Hite | May 9, 1964 | 7130 |
Matt searches for a womanizer who left his wife and six kids and ends-up finding a seductive black widow.
| 338 | 33 | "The Warden" | Andrew V. McLaglen | Les Crutchfield | May 16, 1964 | 7133 |
A vile domineering man holds a lie over his young ward's head and they both come to odds concerning the ownership of an attractive Indian girl.
| 339 | 34 | "Homecoming" | Harry Harris | Shimon Bar-David^{[B]} | May 23, 1964 | 7134 |
A cheating woman orchestrates a plan to kill two birds with one stone, her current husband and her ex-husband whose just been released from prison.
| 340 | 35 | "The Other Half" | Andrew V. McLaglen | John Dunkel | May 30, 1964 | 7135 |
There are no witnesses when a man's twin brother is murdered while working late, leaving Matt with little evidence to go on.
| 341 | 36 | "Journey for Three" | Harry Harris | Frank Paris | June 6, 1964 | 7136 |
Good and evil fight over a young man's soul when two brothers realize that they're traveling with a sociopath.

== Release ==
=== Broadcast ===
Season nine aired Saturdays at 10:00-11:00 pm (EST) on CBS.

The episode "Owney Tupper Had a Daughter", which aired April 4, 1964, as episode 27 had originally been scheduled to air on November 23, 1963, but was pre-empted due to the coverage of the assassination of John F. Kennedy.

=== Home media ===
The ninth season was released on DVD by Paramount Home Entertainment in a two volume set on August 6, 2013.

== Reception ==
Gunsmoke season 9 fell to number 20 in the Nielsen ratings.
