= Gunsmoke season 8 =

Gunsmoke
- Season 8
- Starring: James Arness; Dennis Weaver; Milburn Stone; Amanda Blake; Burt Reynolds
- No. of episodes: 38

Release
- Original network: CBS
- Original release: September 15, 1962 – June 1, 1963

Season chronology
- ← Previous; Season 7 Next → Season 9

Gunsmoke is an American Western television series developed by Charles Marquis Warren and based on the radio program of the same name. The series ran for 20 seasons, making it the longest-running Western in television history.

The first episode of season 8 aired in the United States on September 15, 1962, and the final episode aired on June 1, 1963. All episodes were broadcast in the U.S. by CBS.

Season 8 of Gunsmoke was the second season of one-hour episodes filmed in black-and-white. Seasons 1–6 were half-hour episodes, and color episodes were not filmed until season 12.

== Synopsis ==
Gunsmoke is set in and around Dodge City, Kansas, in the post-Civil War era and centers on United States Marshal Matt Dillon (James Arness) as he enforces law and order in the city. In its original format, the series also focuses on Dillon's friendship with three other citizens of Dodge City: Doctor Galen "Doc" Adams (Milburn Stone), the town's physician; Kitty Russell (Amanda Blake), saloon girl and later owner of the Long Branch Saloon; and Chester Goode (Dennis Weaver), Dillon's assistant. In season eight, a fifth regular character was added to the cast: blacksmith Quint Asper (Burt Reynolds), who remained until the end of season 10.

== Cast and characters ==
=== Main ===
- James Arness as Matt Dillon
- Dennis Weaver as Chester
- Milburn Stone as Doc
- Amanda Blake as Kitty
- Glenn Strange as Sam Noonan
- Burt Reynolds as Quint Asper

== Production ==
Season 8 consisted of 38 one-hour black-and-white episodes produced by Norman Macdonnell and Frank Paris as associate producer.

Season 8 included the first of two episodes directed by William Conrad, who played the role of Matt Dillon on the radio version of Gunsmoke from 1952–1961. In this season, he directed episode 31, "Panacea Sykes".

=== Casting ===
Episode 13, "Us Haggens", is the first episode to feature Ken Curtis as Festus, who would become a regular character in later seasons.

== Episodes ==
No. overall	No. in season	Title	Directed by	Written by	Original release date	Prod. code
268	1	"The Search"	Harry Harris	Kathleen Hite	September 15, 1962	31208
Matt encounters numerous hurdles when he crosses the prairie unarmed and without a mount in an attempt to save a paralyzed young stable hand who was thrown from his horse.
269	2	"Call Me Dodie"	Harry Harris	Kathleen Hite	September 22, 1962	31206
A naive and wide-eyed young woman escapes the cruel conditions at an orphanage and receives life lessons in Dodge.
270	3	"Quint Asper Comes Home"	Andrew V. McLaglen	John Meston	September 29, 1962	31035
A half-Indian named Quint Asper vows revenge on all white men when a pair of drifters kill his father and threaten his mother.
271	4	"Root Down"	Sobey Martin	Kathleen Hite	October 6, 1962	31210
An attractive but manipulative young lady lies to her shiftless father and ruffian brother in a scheme to lure Chester into marriage.
272	5	"Jenny"	Andrew V. McLaglen	John Meston	October 13, 1962	31207
Matt has his hands full when a bank robber's girlfriend makes unwanted romantic overtures towards him.
273	6	"Collie's Free"	Harry Harris	Kathleen Hite	October 20, 1962	31204
A man released from prison has trouble adjusting to a normal life, blaming Matt and the rancher he shot for eight years lost.
274	7	"The Ditch"	Harry Harris	Les Crutchfield	October 27, 1962	31212
Matt tries to prevent a range war when a female rancher following her father's dreams digs a trench to divert a creek which would cut off the water supply of all neighboring homesteads.
275	8	"The Trappers"	Andrew V. McLaglen	John Dunkel	November 3, 1962	31209
The friendship between two trappers is jeopardized when one, who admits he's a coward, abandons the other to die after being stabbed by an Indian during a struggle.
276	9	"Phoebe Strunk"	Andrew V. McLaglen	John Meston	November 10, 1962	31213
A merciless mother and her four demented sons' prey upon frontier families on their travels west.
277	10	"The Hunger"	Harry Harris	Jack Curtis	November 17, 1962	31036
An abusive father, who resents his daughter's hunger for knowledge, beats and locks her in the cellar, and when Matt and Doc rescue her, she falls in love with her knight in shining armor.
278	11	"Abe Blocker"	Andrew V. McLaglen	John Meston	November 24, 1962	31215
Matt's friend, an old mountain man suffers a psychotic break and goes on a murder spree when civilization closes in on him.
279	12	"The Way It Is"	Harry Harris	Kathleen Hite	December 1, 1962	31214
Kitty is at wit's end when Matt once more breaks a date with her, and in her haste to fill the void, finds a man who's more responsive to her needs.
280	13	"Us Haggens"	Andrew V. McLaglen	Les Crutchfield	December 8, 1962	31205
Matt hunts down a vicious killer and is assisted by an unlikely source, the outlaw's nephew, who has his own score to settle with his uncle.
281	14	"Uncle Sunday"	Joseph Sargent	John Meston	December 15, 1962	31218
Chester's crooked uncle comes to town with a pretty young lady on his arm with plans to rob the bank, but when a third offender enters the picture, all plans go sideways.
282	15	"False Front"	Andrew V. McLaglen	Story by : Hal Moffett; Screenplay by : John Meston	December 22, 1962	31201
A journalist bets a gambler that he can take a greenhorn that's never handled a gun out to Dodge, and with a little rumor mongering, have him pass as a gunslinger and not get killed in two weeks, but the gambler hedges his bet to influence the outcome.
283	16	"Old Comrade"	Harry Harris	John Dunkel	December 29, 1962	31217
An old ailing military General asks his best friend to locate his long-lost son, and what he finds is a likeable but illiterate and uncouth simpleton.
284	17	"Louie Pheeters"	Harry Harris	John Meston	January 5, 1963	31202
Louie is a witness to murder but believes it's only a dream, until he recognizes the culprit in the Long Branch and mindlessly informs him on what he saw.
285	18	"The Renegades"	Andrew V. McLaglen	John Meston	January 12, 1963	31211
Quint saves an Army officer's daughter from white renegades who're running rampant near Dodge.
286	19	"Cotter's Girl"	Harry Harris	Kathleen Hite	January 19, 1963	31219
A dying drunk tasks Matt with finding his daughter, a free and carefree spirit who makes the Marshal as nervous as a long-tailed cat in a room full of rocking chairs.
287	20	"The Bad One"	Charles Martin	Gwen Bagni	January 26, 1963	31216
A farmer's daughter raised in a convent refuses to identify a stagecoach robber, seeing only good in the outlaw, a decision she may soon regret.
288	21	"The Cousin"	Harry Harris	Story by : Marian Clark; Screenplay by : Kathleen Hite	February 2, 1963	31221
A just released convict, who as a boy hated Matt while growing up together on a Texas ranch, has an urgent need to size him up, but becomes torn between loyalty for the Marshal and his old gang of thieves.
289	22	"Shona"	Ted Post	John Meston	February 9, 1963	31220
An Indian squaw seeking medical attention is rebuffed by Dodge merchants and when Kitty steps in to help, three troublemakers incite an unruly mob to rid her from town, but one of the agitators initiates his own twisted plan.
290	23	"Ash"	Harry Harris	John Meston	February 16, 1963	31223
An unlikely friendship develops between two hotheaded men who end-up becoming business partners, but when one suffers a blow to the head, his personality reverts back to the mean and loathsome buffalo hunter he once was.
291	24	"Blind Man's Bluff"	Ted Post	John Meston	February 23, 1963	31222
Matt tracks a suspected murderer to Elkader, where he's lured into an alley and waylaid by three thugs, suffering a concussion and nearly blind he's rescued by the same man that he was chasing.
292	25	"Quint's Indian"	Fred Jackman, Jr.	Story by : Marian Clark; Screenplay by : John Meston	March 2, 1963	31224
The town turns on Quint, who's accused of horse theft, a story perpetuated by two scheming saddle tramps.
293	26	"Anybody Can Kill a Marshal"	Harry Harris	Kathleen Hite	March 9, 1963	31225
A pair of outlaws with plans to rob the bank, need the Marshal out of the way and hire a somewhat stoic drifter to kill Matt.
294	27	"Two of a Kind"	Andrew V. McLaglen	Merwin Gerard	March 16, 1963	31226
Two Irishmen, who absolutely hate each other are involved in a dangerous feud, and when a villainous land-grabber maneuvers to acquire their properties, they must somehow join forces.
295	28	"I Call Him Wonder"	Harry Harris	Kathleen Hite	March 23, 1963	31227
An orphaned Indian boy latches onto an unemployed cattle drover and both suffer bigotry when they come to Dodge.
296	29	"With a Smile"	Andrew V. McLaglen	Story by : Bud Furillo & George Main; Screenplay by : John Meston	March 30, 1963	31228
A powerful rancher exhausts every avenue to stop the hanging of his cowardly son, and when the prospects look bleak, concocts a plan to prove his bravery.
297	30	"The Far Places"	Harry Harris	John Dunkel	April 6, 1963	31229
A demanding mother pressures her son to live out her dreams by leaving the harsh life of farming behind and explore the far places.
298	31	"Panacea Sykes"	William Conrad	Kathleen Hite	April 13, 1963	31203
Difficult days lay ahead for Kitty when a conniving woman who had a hand in raising her, comes to Dodge for a visit.
299	32	"Tell Chester"	Joseph Sargent	Frank Paris	April 20, 1963	31231
Chester promises to keep a bigamist's secret, but the man doesn't believe him and makes plans to ensure his story stays hidden.
300	33	"Quint-Cident"	Andrew V. McLaglen	Kathleen Hite	April 27, 1963	31230
A recently widowed woman becomes infatuated with Quint and when he spurns her advances, she accuses him of a heinous crime.
301	34	"Old York"	Harry Harris	John Meston	May 4, 1963	31233
Matt crosses paths with an old friend who saved his life years ago and now believes he can take advantage of their friendship.
302	35	"Daddy Went Away"	Joseph Sargent	Story by : John Rosser; Screenplay by : Kathleen Hite	May 11, 1963	31232
Chester helps a widow and her daughter establish a dressmaking business in Dodge and when he begins to have feelings for her, he discovers that her husband is very much alive.
303	36	"The Odyssey of Jubal Tanner"	Andrew V. McLaglen	Paul Savage	May 18, 1963	31234
The lives of a Civil War veteran and a saloon girl converge when both cross paths with the same brutish buffalo hunter.
304	37	"Jeb"	Harry Harris	Paul Savage	May 25, 1963	31235
A wandering farm boy finds an abandoned horse and sells it to his newfound friend, events that lead to deadly consequences.
305	38	"The Quest for Asa Janin"	Andrew V. McLaglen	Paul Savage	June 1, 1963	31236
Matt must act fast when he begins a long trek to capture a woman killer, before his friend whose been convicted of the crime, is hanged.

== Release ==
=== Broadcast ===
Season eight aired Saturdays at 10:00-11:00 pm (EST) on CBS.

=== Home media ===
The eighth season was released on DVD by Paramount Home Entertainment in a two volumes set on May 7, 2013.

== Reception ==
Gunsmoke season 8 dropped to number 10 in the Nielsen ratings
