= The Doctor's Wife (disambiguation) =

The Doctor's Wife may refer to:

== Books ==
- The Doctor's Wife, an 1864 novel by Mary Elizabeth Braddon
- Doctor's Wife, a 1938 novel by Maysie Coucher Greig
- The Doctor's Wife, a 1963 novel by Michael Avallone
- The Doctor's Wife (Ariyoshi novel), a 1966 novel by Sawako Ariyoshi
- The Doctor's Wife, a 1966 novel by Peggy Dern
- The Doctor's Wife (Moore novel), a 1976 novel by Brian Moore
- The Doctor's Wife, a 1999 novel by Cheryl St. John
- The Doctor's Wife, a 2007 true crime book by John Glatt
- The Doctor's Wife, a 2022 novel by Fiona Sussman

== Film, TV and radio ==
- The Doctor's Wife, a 1930 comedy short film with Franklin Pangborn, Gertrude Astor, Geneva Mitchell and Billy Gilbert
- The Doctor's Wife (radio series), American radio soap opera

=== Television episodes ===
- "Doctor's Wife", Gunsmoke season 10, episode 5 (1964)
- "The Doctor's Wife", American Justice season 13, episode 19 (2003)
- "The Doctor's Wife", Doctor Who series 5, episode 4 (2011)
- "The Doctor's Wife", Lux Video Theatre season 2, episode 10 (1951)
- "The Doctor's Wife", NBC Matinee Theater season 1, episode 120 (1956)
- "The Doctor's Wife", Studio One (American) season 5, episode 3 (1952)
- "The Doctor's Wife", Time Express episode 1b (1979)

== See also ==
- "The Doctor and the Doctor's Wife", a 1925 short story by Ernest Hemingway
- The Doctor Takes a Wife, a 1940 American screwball comedy film
- Doctors' Wives
