= My Father, My Son =

My Father, My Son may refer to:

== Books ==
- My Father, My Son, a 1958 autobiography by Edward G. Robinson Jr., co-written with author William R. Duffy
- My Father, My Son, a 1986 book by John Pekkanen, in collaboration with Admiral Elmo Zumwalt, Jr.

== Film and TV ==
- My Father, My Son (film), a 1988 US made-for-TV film, based on Pekkanen's book starring Keith Carradine
- "My Father, My Son", a 1966 episode of the US TV series Gunsmoke
- "My Father, My Son", a 1982 episode of the US TV series Dallas
- My Father and My Son, a 2005 Turkish film
