= The Road West =

- Genre: Western
- Starring: Barry Sullivan
- Opening theme: The Road West by Leonard Rosenman
- Country of origin: United States
- Original language: English
- No. of seasons: 1
- No. of episodes: 29

Production
- Executive producer: Norman Macdonnell
- Running time: 60 minutes

Original release
- Network: NBC
- Release: September 12, 1966 – May 1, 1967

The Road West is an American Western television series that aired on NBC from September 12, 1966, to May 1, 1967.

== Overview ==
Ben Pride moves with his children Timothy, Midge, and Kip, his new wife Elizabeth, his father Tom, and his brother-in-law Chance from Ohio to Kansas during the 1860s. The show centers on the difficulties the family faces taming the land and homesteading.

== Cast ==
- Barry Sullivan as Ben Pride
- Glenn Corbett as Chance Reynolds
- Kathryn Hays as Elizabeth Pride
- Andrew Prine as Timothy Pride
- Brenda Scott as Midge Pride
- Kelly Corcoran as Kip Pride
- Charles Seel as Tom Pride

== Episodes ==
No.	Title	Directed by	Written by	Original release date
1	"This Savage Land (Part 1)"	Vincent McEveety	Richard Fielder	September 12, 1966
2	"This Savage Land (Part 2)"	Vincent McEveety	Richard Fielder	September 19, 1966
The Pride family are captured, while Elizabeth and Midge are kidnapped. Guest stars: George C. Scott, John Drew Barrymore
3	"The Gunfighter"	Charles S. Dubin	Unknown	September 26, 1966
An ageing former gunman tries to turn a fight between Tim Pride and a cowboy into a gun battle. Guest stars: James Daly
4	"The Lean Years"	Unknown	Unknown	October 3, 1966
After killing a man in self-defense, Corbett becomes hunted and flees to the family home. Guest stars: Elva Miller
5	"This Dry and Thirsty Land"	Bernard McEveety	Unknown	October 10, 1966
6	"Long Journey to Leavenworth"	Unknown	Unknown	October 17, 1966
Ben and his son agree to deliver an outlaw to prison for a fee. Guest stars: Geoffrey Horne, Robert F. Simon, John Pickard, Hal Baylor
7	"Ashes and Tallow and One True Love"	Unknown	Unknown	October 24, 1966
8	"Piece of Tin"	Robert Totten	Unknown	October 31, 1966
9	"Lone Woman"	Unknown	Unknown	November 7, 1966
10	"Shaman"	Unknown	Unknown	November 14, 1966
11	"To Light a Candle"	Paul Stanley	Unknown	November 28, 1966
12	"Pariah"	Paul Stanley	Unknown	December 5, 1966
13	"Have You Seen the Aurora Borealis?"	Unknown	Unknown	December 12, 1966
14	"Power of Fear"	Unknown	Unknown	December 26, 1966
15	"Reap the Whirlwind"	Unknown	Unknown	January 9, 1967
16	"Beyond the Hill"	Unknown	Unknown	January 16, 1967
17	"The Predators"	Harry Harris	Unknown	January 23, 1967
18	"A Mighty Hunter Before the Lord"	Unknown	Unknown	January 30, 1967
19	"No Sanctuary"	Unknown	Unknown	February 6, 1967
20	"The Insider"	Unknown	Unknown	February 13, 1967
21	"Road to Glory"	Unknown	Unknown	February 20, 1967
22	"Fair Ladies of France"	Unknown	Unknown	February 27, 1967
23	"Never Chase a Rainbow"	Unknown	Unknown	March 6, 1967
24	"Eleven Miles to Eden"	Paul Henreid	Unknown	March 13, 1967
25	"Charade of Justice"	Unknown	Unknown	March 27, 1967
Ben regrets having a horse-thieving teenager arrested after a judge sentences him to hang. Guest stars: Tom Tryon as Sheriff Tom Platt, Kurt Russell as teenager Jay Baker, Jay C. Flippen as Judge Platt, and Barbara Anderson as Susan Douglass ("Pariah") and Barbara ("Never Chase a Rainbow")
26	"The Eighty-Seven Dollar Bride"	Paul Henreid	Unknown	April 3, 1967
27	"A War for the Gravediggers"	Unknown	Unknown	April 10, 1967
During a trip to buy cattle, Ben and Tim get involved in a political revolution in a small Mexican town. Guest stars: Michael Ansara as Serafin and Joe De Santis as Octaviano
28	"The Agreement"	Charles S. Dubin	Eric Stone and Dean Reisner	April 24, 1967
After killing a woman's son who tried to commit a robbery, Chance faces the consequences from the boy's mother. Guest stars: James Gammon as Deputy Bramley, Virginia Gregg as Lavinia Bishop and Barbara Werle as Laura
29	"Elizabeth's Odyssey"	Anton Leader	Kathleen Hite	May 1, 1967
Elizabeth and Chance come close to losing faith in humanity during a mercy errand, as they embark on a two day journal to Grimmer's farm. Guest stars: Albert Salmi as Hawes Leggett, Kay Kuter and Svea Grunfeld as Nester and his wife

== Production ==
Executive producer Macdonnell regarded the show's storyline as being identifiable to the viewing audience, with an essential family unit comprising family members "bound to the other by either a true familiar relationship or by an intangible camaraderie". A core idea of the show was to present a realistic portrayal of the real struggles faced by settlers who traveled 'The Road West', with extreme temperatures in each of the summer and winter seasons.

The show's lead actor, Barry Sullivan, was marking his fourth series and described the show as being "a piece of pioneer literature". He had previously expressed that he would never star in a weekly television series again, although he warmed to the show when he began working closely with the cast and crew. Having spent long periods of time driving an old wagon for the show, Sullivan decided to take lessons and spent seven consecutive Saturdays in Antelope Valley, California perfecting the driving technique.

Production moved away from Kansas in 1967, with it reported that the shift in location was always the plan, although happened sooner than anticipated due to the show's future being at risk. Ratings struggled against other shows including Family Affair and The Felony Squad, while Seel's character Tom Pride was killed off to reduce costs.

=== Filming ===
Sullivan said in an interview that scripts for the show would be provided several weeks in advance, which allowed time to absorb the scripts in order to perfect their lines and character portrayals.

== Reception ==
The show was highly anticipated by The Atlanta Constitution writer Paul Jones, who predicted that the show would "be the most successful new show of the television season", based on his opinion that there had not been a western show flop for considerable time and of his high rating for producer Norman Macdonnell.

== Media Information ==
Following the cancellation of the series, Universal edited the first two episodes (This Savage Land, Parts 1 and 2) into a 97-minute feature film called This Savage Land, which was released to U.S. theaters as a second feature in June 1969.
