= Defense Attorney =

American radio program

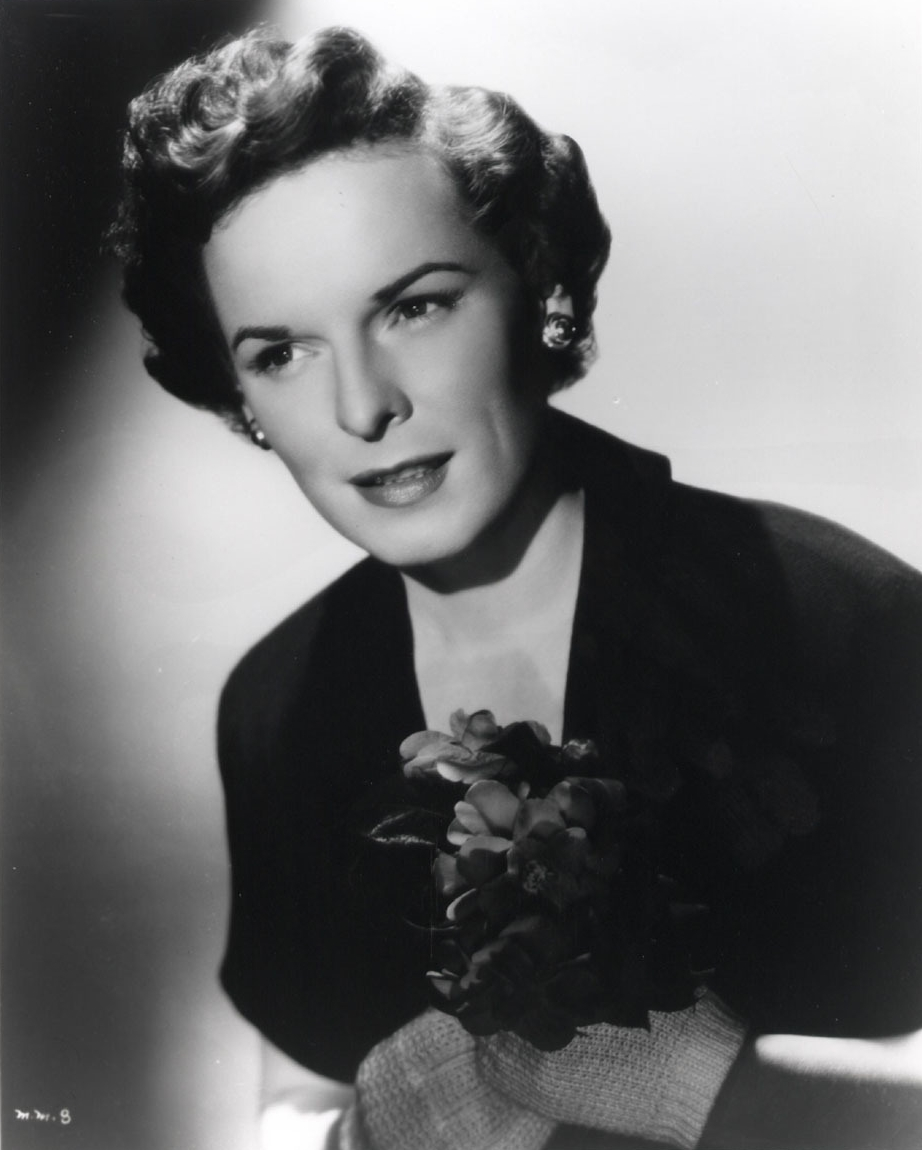
- Mercedes McCambridge
- Other names: The Defense Rests
- Genre: Crime drama
- Running time: 30 minutes
- Country of origin: United States
- Language: English
- Syndicates: ABC
- Starring: Mercedes McCambridge; Howard Culver
- Announcer: Orville Anderson
- Created by: Cameron Blake
- Written by: Cameron Blake; Bill Johnston; Joel Murcott
- Directed by: Dwight Hauser
- Produced by: Warren Lewis
- Original release: July 6, 1951 – December 30, 1952

Defense Attorney is an American old-time radio crime drama. It was broadcast on ABC from July 6, 1951, (Note: Although two old-time radio reference books (On the Air: The Encyclopedia of Old-Time Radio and Radio Crime Fighters: Over 300 Programs from the Golden Age) give the starting date as August 31, 1951, The Digital Deli Too gives July 6, 1951, as the starting date. Radio listings in contemporary newspapers also show that the program was first aired on July 6, 1951.) to December 30, 1952. It was also known as The Defense Rests.

== Characters ==
The title character was Martha Ellis "Marty" Bryant, "a respected attorney who has a reputation for integrity" and "who champions causes of the underdog and unjustly accused". Jud Barnes, a newspaper reporter, was Bryant's boyfriend. Ron Lackmann wrote in his book Mercedes McCambridge: A Biography and Career Record that Bryant "spent more time solving crimes with her boyfriend ... than she did in the courtroom".

== Personnel ==
Mercedes McCambridge had the title role, and Howard Culver played Judson Barnes. Tony Barrett portrayed Detective Lieutenant Ed Ledis. Supporting actors in the program included Paul Fries, Bill Johnston, Kay Wiley, Harry Bartell, Dallas McKennon, Irene Tedrow, and Parley Baer. Orville Anderson was the announcer.

Warren Lewis was the producer, and Dwight Hauser was the director. Cameron Blake (the program's creator), Bill Johnston, and Joel Murcott were writers. Music was by Rex Khoury and Basil Adlam.

== Background ==
Defense Attorney originated with an audition record, The Defense Rests, which was made for a proposed NBC series in April 1951.

== TV pilot ==
In 1953, the trade publication Billboard reported on work on a television version of Defense Attorney. An article in the magazine's March 28, 1953, issue said that Don Sharpe was in New York "to begin sales efforts on his newest film show, Defense Attorney, starring Mercedes McCambridge, and based on his former radio series of the same name." Fletcher Markle wrote and directed the pilot episode, which was filmed by Desilu Productions.

== Recognition ==
McCambridge's work on Defense Attorney led to her receiving honorary membership in the Los Angeles Women's Bar Association and the Favorite Dramatic Actress Award from Radio-TV Mirror magazine.
