= James Nusser =

American film and television actor (1905–1979)

- Born: May 3, 1905; Ohio, U.S.
- Died: June 8, 1979 (aged 74); Los Angeles, California, U.S.
- Occupations: Film and television actor
- Years active: 1951–1976

James Nusser (May 3, 1905 – June 8, 1979) was an American film and television actor. He was best known for playing the recurring role of town drunk Louis Pheeters in the American western television series Gunsmoke from 1961 to 1970.

Nusser guest-starred in numerous television programs including I Married Joan, Sergeant Preston of the Yukon, Gunsmoke, Perry Mason, Bat Masterson, The Fugitive, The Virginian, The Wild Wild West, Mannix and Cannon. He also appeared in films such as Bonzo Goes to College, One Girl's Confession, It Should Happen to You, Hell Canyon Outlaws, The Rare Breed, Hillbillys in a Haunted House, Where Were You When the Lights Went Out?, Hail, Hero! and Cahill U.S. Marshal.

Nusser died on June 8, 1979, in Los Angeles, California, at the age of 74. He was buried in Valhalla Memorial Park Cemetery.

== Filmography ==
=== Film ===
Year	Title	Role	Notes
1952	Bonzo Goes to College	Golfer	uncredited
1953	One Girl's Confession	Warden	
1954	It Should Happen to You	board member	uncredited
1956	Mohawk	Settler	uncredited
1957	Hell Canyon Outlaws	Oscar Schultz	
1966	The Rare Breed	Kelly	uncredited
1967	Hillbillys in a Haunted House	Janitor	
1968	Where Were You When the Lights Went Out?	Passenger	uncredited
1969	Hail, Hero!	Max	
1973	Cahill U.S. Marshal	Doctor Jones	

=== Television ===
Year	Title	Role	Notes
1951	Space Patrol	Ben	Season 1 Episode 34: "The Underwater Hideout"
1952	Chevron Theatre		Season 1 Episode 11: "Poor Miss Emmie"
1953	I Led 3 Lives	Captain Norton	Season 1 Episode 7: "Army Infiltration"
1953	The Ford Television Theatre		Season 5 Episode 14: "Alias Nora Hale"
1954–1955	I Married Joan	miscellaneous roles	2 episodes (seasons 2–3)
1954–1958	The Lineup	Willie Martin	5 episodes (seasons 1, 4)
1955–1956	Schlitz Playhouse of Stars	miscellaneous roles	2 episodes (seasons 4–5)
1955	TV Reader's Digest	Harry Griffin	S1:E9, "The American Master Counterfeiters"
1955	The Man Behind the Badge	Coroner	S2:E21, "The Case of the Unwelcome Stranger"
1955	Sergeant Preston of the Yukon	Captain Whitman	S1:E14, "The Mad Wolf of Lost Canyon"
1956–1970	Gunsmoke	miscellaneous roles	5 episodes credited (seasons 1–6)
1956–1970	Gunsmoke	Louie Pheeters	recurring character; 69 episodes credited (seasons 7–15)
1956	The Star and the Story		Season 2 Episode 22: "The Lonely Ones"
1956	Jane Wyman Presents the Fireside Theatre	Cab Driver	Season 2 Episode 7: "No More Tears"
1956	Dragnet		Season 6 Episode 13: "The Big Handcuffs"
1957	Broken Arrow	Al Perkins	Season 1 Episode 17: "The Missionaries"
1957	Dr. Christian	McKnight	Season 1 Episode 21: "Mother's Boy"
1957	Perry Mason	Judge	S1:E12 "The Case of the Negligent Nymph"
1958	The Court of Last Resort	Judge	Season 1 Episode 25: "The Todd–Loomis Case"
1958	The Texan	Shanks	Season 1 Episode 4: "The First Notch"
1959	Peter Gunn	Bartender	Season 1 Episode 36: "Vendetta"
1960–1961	Bat Masterson	miscellaneous roles	2 episodes (seasons 2–3)
1960	This Man Dawson		Season 1 Episode 24: "Accessory to Murder"
1960	Riverboat	Hotel Clerk	Season 2 Episode 9: "The Quota"
1961	Mrs. G. Goes to College	Telephone Man	Season 1 Episode 13: "Mrs. G.'s Private Telephone"
1962	Ben Casey	Burleigh Hanks	S1:E15, "Imagine a Long Bright Corridor"
1962	Target: The Corruptors!	Stickface's Accomplice	Season 1 Episode 26: "A Man's Castle"
1963	Temple Houston	Flytrap	Season 1 Episode 10: "Billy Hart"
1965	The Fugitive	Smiley	Season 2 Episode 28: "A.P.B."
1965	The Long, Hot Summer	Pliny	Season 1 Episode 7: "No Hiding Place"
1966	The Road West	Amos	Season 1 Episode 3: "The Gunfighter"
1967–1968	The Virginian	miscellaneous roles	3 episodes (seasons 6–7)
1967	Cimarron Strip	Judge Homer Padgett	Season 1 Episode 10: "Till the End of Night"
1967	The Wild Wild West	Reeves	S3:E12 "The Night of the Legion of Death"
1968	The Outsider	Thin Man	Season 1 Episode 10: "I Can't Hear You Scream"
1969	Then Came Bronson	Ben Crosswell	Season 1 Episode 2: "The Old Motorcycle Fiasco"
1970	The Wonderful World of Disney	Ben Forrester	Season 16 Episodes 18–19: ("Menace on the Mountain: Parts 1 and 2")
1970	The Mod Squad	Gus	Season 3 Episode 2: "See the Eagles Dying"
1972	The Waltons	Jake the Junkman	Season 1 Episode 4: "The Hunt"
1976	Cannon	Ryan	Season 5 Episode 16: "The Reformer"
