= Doctors' Wives =

Doctors' Wives may refer to:

- Doctors' Wives (1931 film), a 1931 American Pre-Code romantic drama film
- Doctors' Wives (1971 film), a 1971 American drama film
