= Charles Seel =

American actor (1897–1980)

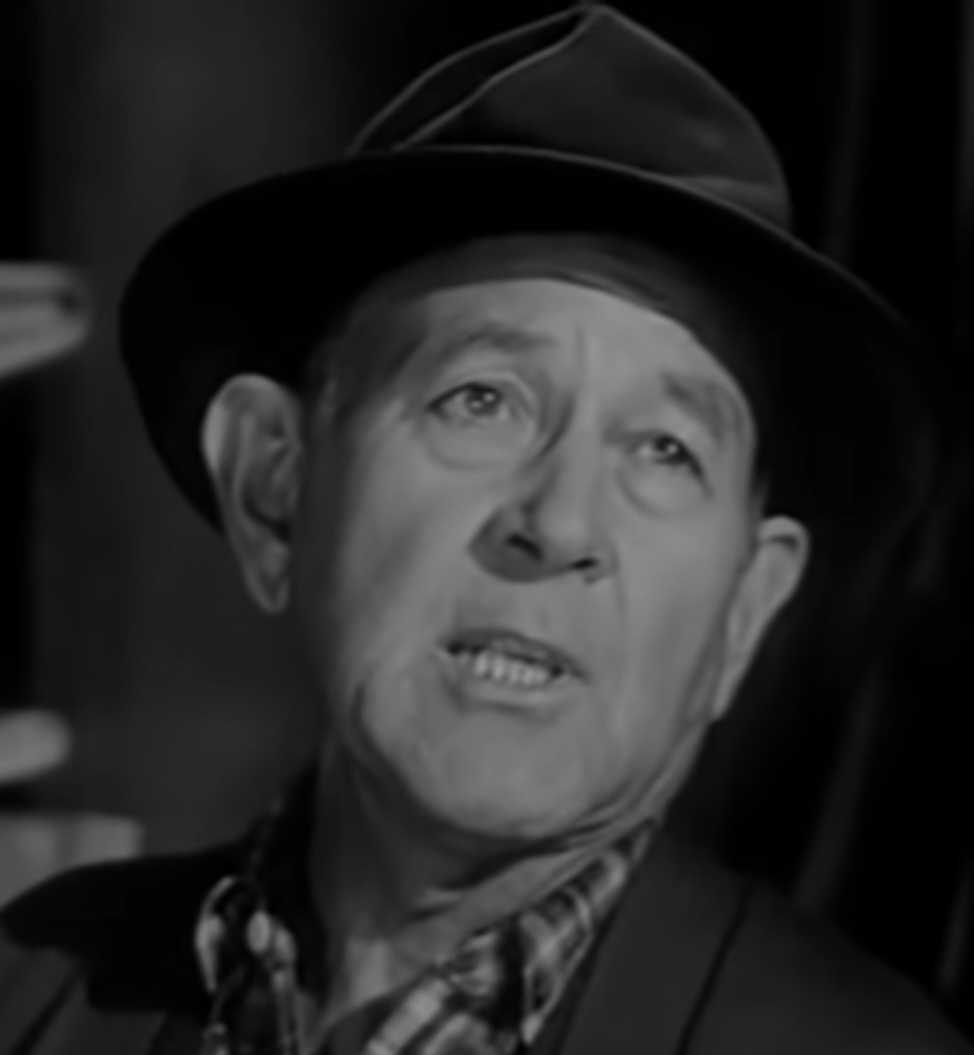
- Charles Seel in One Step Beyond 1961
- Born: April 29, 1897; New York City, U.S.
- Died: April 19, 1980 (aged 82); Los Angeles, California, U.S.
- Resting place: Forest Lawn Memorial Park, Hollywood Hills
- Other names: Charles Seal, Charles F. Seel
- Occupation: Actor
- Years active: 1929–1980

Charles Seel (April 29, 1897 – April 19, 1980) was an American actor. He acted in over 30 films from 1938 to 1974 and appeared in over one hundred titles for television from 1952 to 1974. He was also credited as Charles Seal and Charles F. Seel.

== Biography ==
Charles Seel was born in the Bronx, New York, on April 29, 1897. As a young man he worked for the Biograph Studios as a handyman in the wake of the crew. Later, he began acting on stage in vaudeville, then on Broadway, and then in radio before moving to Hollywood in 1937.

He played the old man in the 1971 film, Duel. For television, he played, among others, Otis in five episodes of the television series Tombstone Territory from 1957 to 1958, Doc Miller in two episodes of The Deputy in 1960, newspaper editor Mr. Krinkie in nine episodes of the series Dennis the Menace from 1959 to 1963, Barney Danches in 10 episodes of Gunsmoke from 1965 to 1972 and Tom Pride in 29 episodes of the series The Road West from 1966 to 1967.

His last appearance on the small screen came in the episode The Christmas Party of the television series Apple's Way which aired on December 22, 1974, in which he plays the role of MacPherson, while for the big screen the last film interpretation was in Airport 1975, in which he plays a passenger who is celebrating his anniversary.

=== Death ===
Seel died in Los Angeles, California, on April 19, 1980, ten days before his 83rd birthday, and was buried at Forest Lawn Memorial Park in Hollywood Hills.

== Selected filmography ==
=== Film ===
- Comet Over Broadway (1938) - Jury Foreman (uncredited)
- Off the Record (1939) - Veterinary (uncredited)
- Blackwell's Island (1939) - Surgeon (uncredited)
- Here Comes Mr. Jordan (1941) - Board Member (uncredited)
- Not Wanted (1949) - Dr. Williams
- The Texas Rangers (1951) - Bartender (uncredited)
- The Man with the Golden Arm (1955) - Proprietor (uncredited)
- I Was a Teenage Frankenstein (1957) - Mr. Sexton, the jeweler
- The Wild and the Innocent (1959) - Trapper (uncredited)
- The Horse Soldiers (1959) - Newton Station Bartender (uncredited)
- It Started with a Kiss (1959) - Stage Doorman (uncredited)
- Pillow Talk (1959) - Antique Dealer (uncredited)
- Please Don't Eat the Daisies (1960) - Upholstery Man (uncredited)
- Pollyanna (1960) - Train Conductor (uncredited)
- Sergeant Rutledge (1960) - Dr. Walter Eckner (uncredited)
- The Dark at the Top of the Stairs (1960) - Percy Weems (uncredited)
- The Walking Target (1960) - Editor (uncredited)
- North to Alaska (1960) - Gold Buyer (uncredited)
- Cimarron (1960) - Charles (uncredited)
- Return to Peyton Place (1961) - Diner Proprietor (uncredited)
- The Honeymoon Machine (1961) - Harvey (uncredited)
- The Second Time Around (1961) - Sam (uncredited)
- The Man Who Shot Liberty Valance (1962) - Election Council President (uncredited)
- Period of Adjustment (1962) - Storekeeper (uncredited)
- Tammy and the Doctor (1963) - Dr. Smithers
- Donovan's Reef (1963) - Grand Uncle Sedley Atterbury Pennyfeather (uncredited)
- The Man from Galveston (1963) - Mr. Steers (uncredited)
- The Tattooed Police Horse (1964) - Ben
- Lady in a Cage (1964) - Mr. Paul, Junkyard Proprietor (uncredited)
- Cheyenne Autumn (1964) - Newspaper Publisher (uncredited)
- Fluffy (1965) - Farmer (uncredited)
- The Great Race (1965) - Freight Agent (uncredited)
- The Chase (1966) - Texan at Party (uncredited)
- Mister Buddwing (1966) - Printer
- Chamber of Horrors (1966) - Reverend Dr. Hopewell
- Where Were You When the Lights Went Out? (1968) - Taxi Driver (uncredited)
- Winning (1969) - Eshovo (uncredited)
- One More Train to Rob (1971, TV Movie) - Reverend
- Duel (1971) - Old Man
- Sssssss (1973) - Old Man
- Westworld (1973) - Bellhop
- Airport 1975 (1974) - 50th Anniversary Celebrant - Passenger (uncredited)

=== Television ===
- Wagon Train (1957) Season 1 Episode 4 " The zRuyh Owen's Story" - settler
- Tombstone Territory (1957-1958) - Otis / Bartender
- Alfred Hitchcock Presents (1958) (Season 4 Episode 9: "Murder Me Twice") - Court Clerk
- Bat Masterson (1958) - Bartender
- Alfred Hitchcock Presents (1958) (Season 4 Episode 25: "The Kind Waitress") - County Clerk
- The Deputy (1959-1960) - Doc Zach Miller / Doc Miller / Dr. Miller
- Dennis the Menace (1960-1963) - Mr. Krinkie
- Gunsmoke (1961-1974) - Barney Danches /One /Josiah /Eli
- Hazel (1962) (Season 1 Episode 29) - Chet Cooper
- The Twilight Zone (1962) (Season 3 Episode 19) - Reverend Wood
- The Alfred Hitchcock Hour (1963) (Season 2 Episode 4: "You'll Be the Death of Me") - Doctor Chalmont
- The Alfred Hitchcock Hour (1964) (Season 3 Episode 1: "The Return of Verge Likens") - Rush Sigafoose
- The Road West (1966-1967) - Tom Pride
- The Virginian (1968) (Season 6 Episode 12: "The Barren Ground") - The Doctor
- Star Trek (1968) (Season 3 Episode 6 "Spectre of the Gun") - Ed (the bartender)
- Adam-12 (1970) (Season 2 Episode 15: "Bottom of the Bottle") - Manager
- Adam-12 (1970) (Season 2 Episode 23: "Child Stealer") - Old Man
- Apple's Way (1974) - MacPherson
