= Howard Culver =

American actor (1918–1984)

- Culver's image on a gold-plated Straight Arrow ring, a radio premium circulated in 1950
- Born: June 4, 1918; Colorado, U.S.
- Died: August 4, 1984 (aged 66); Hong Kong
- Occupation: Actor
- Years active: 1948–1982

Howard Culver (June 4, 1918 – August 4, 1984) was an American radio and television actor, best known as hotel clerk Howie Uzzell during the entire run of TV's Gunsmoke. On radio he starred in the title role of the Western adventure series Straight Arrow, which aired on Mutual from May 6, 1948 to June 21, 1951.

== Biography ==
Culver grew up in Los Angeles, and he was first heard as an actor on CBS while he was a teenager. He served in the Navy for three years during World War II, returning to continue on many San Francisco and Hollywood-based radio shows. In 1948, he was the last actor to portray Ellery Queen on radio's The Adventures of Ellery Queen. After Straight Arrow, he co-starred with Mercedes McCambridge as reporter Jud Barnes on ABC's Defense Attorney (1951–52).

Jack French recalled Culver in his 1996 essay on Straight Arrow:

McCann Erickson decided the new series would be broadcast from Los Angeles, and they quickly chose their cast from West Coast talent. Howard Culver, who had been the narrator of We Deliver the Goods and the announcer on Chandu the Magician, was selected for the title lead. At the time, he had a small goatee, which would be later be shaved off before his first personal appearance as Straight Arrow... Frank Bingman was hired as the announcer. He had started in radio at age 19 on Life of Mary Southern but was best known then as the voice of Cresta Blanca Wine. Bingman was surprised to find out that Culver occupied his spare time at the studio by knitting. While on The Joan Davis Show, Verna Felton had taught Bingman to knit, but he was a "closet knitter," since he was embarrassed to knit in front of other men. "Well, I don't give a damn what they say!", Culver told Bingman, sounding very unlike Straight Arrow. Thereafter, they both knitted in the studio, and later these two buddies donated their time at local military hospitals, teaching wounded vets to knit... Culver, much like Clayton "Bud" Collyer had been doing for years as Clark Kent/Superman, used his regular voice for Steve Adams and then lowered it for Straight Arrow.

Much information about Culver and Straight Arrow was published in the newsletter, Pow Wow, edited by William and Teresa Harper of North Augusta, South Carolina.

== Films and television ==
In addition to his regular role on Gunsmoke, he made numerous TV guest appearances on such shows as Dragnet, Adam-12, Barnaby Jones, Land of the Giants, and CHiPs. His film roles included a newscaster in Hal Ashby's Shampoo (1975).

== Death ==
On August 4, 1984, while vacationing in Hong Kong, Culver died at age 66 after contracting meningitis.

== Partial filmography ==
- Time Table (1956) – Pete the detective (uncredited)
- Tension at Table Rock (1956) – Clerk (uncredited)
- The Black Whip (1956) – Dr. Gillette
- Cattle Empire (1958) – Preacher (uncredited)
- Hot Car Girl (1958) – Dan – police headquarters sergeant
- -30- (1959) – Walt Ashton
- The Computer Wore Tennis Shoes (1969) – Moderator (uncredited)
- Something's Happened to Dexter (1969)
- Brady Bunch (1969) – Mr Crawford
- The Barefoot Executive (1971) – (uncredited)
- The Million Dollar Duck (1971) – Morgan's Assistant (uncredited)
- Shampoo (1975) – Newscaster (uncredited)
- The Bad News Bears (1976) – Newscaster (uncredited)
- Brigham (1977)
- The Swarm (1978) – Airman #2
- Halloween II (1981) – Man in Pajamas
- Home Safe (1981) – Grandpa Ollie

== Notes ==
- Harper, William H. Straight Arrow: The Definitive Resource for the Straight Arrow Promotion 1949–1956. BearManor Media, 2007.

== Listen to ==
- Howard Culver in Defense Attorney (August 31, 1951)
