= Roger Ewing =

American actor (1942–2025)

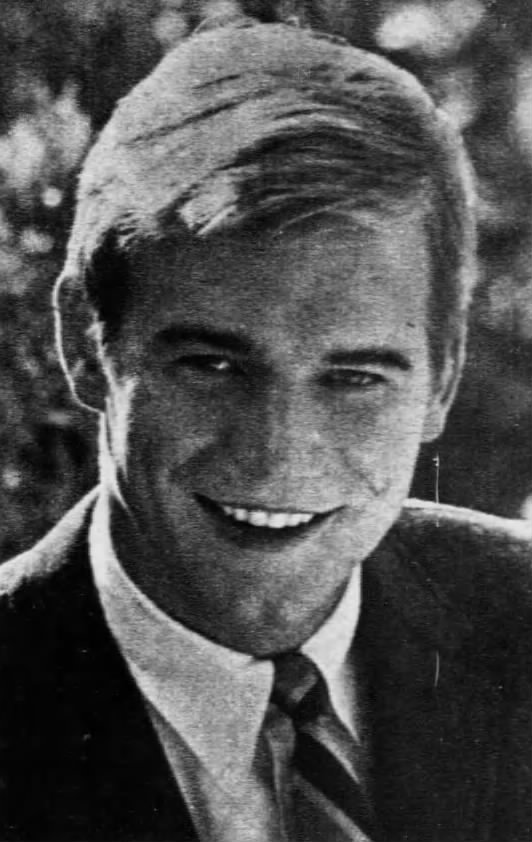
- Ewing in 1967
- Born: Roger Lawrence Ewing; January 12, 1942; Los Angeles, California, U.S.
- Died: December 18, 2025 (aged 83); Morro Bay, California, U.S.
- Occupation: Actor
- Years active: 1964–1972

Roger Lawrence Ewing (January 12, 1942 – December 18, 2025) was an American actor. He was best known for playing Thad Greenwood in the American western television series Gunsmoke.

== Life and career ==
Roger Lawrence Ewing was born in Los Angeles, California on January 12, 1942. He had been a fan of the CBS western television series Gunsmoke while in high school, where he had appeared in a parody of the television series. He began his screen career in 1964, appearing in the film Ensign Pulver.

In 1965, Ewing guest-starred in Gunsmoke, appearing in the episode "Song for Dying". Ewing's performance impressed the producers, who offered him the role of Clayton Thaddeus "Thad" Greenwood, joining the main cast. At the time, there was a contract dispute between star James Arness and CBS, and Ewing's character was created by CBS with a view to replacing Arness should they deem it necessary. By 1967, the disagreement had been resolved, and Ewing's character was written out of the televisions eries. He guest-starred in television programs including Rawhide, The Farmer's Daughter, Bewitched, The Eleventh Hour and Room 222.

Ewing retired from acting in 1972, last appearing in the film Play It as It Lays. After retiring from acting, he worked as a professional photographer.

== Death ==
Ewing died in Morro Bay, California on December 18, 2025, at the age of 83.

== Filmography ==
=== Film ===
Year	Title	Role	Notes
1964	Ensign Pulver	Jackson	Uncredited
1965	None but the Brave	Pvt. Swensholm	
1969	Smith!	Donald Maxwell	
1972	Play It as It Lays	Nelson	

=== Television ===
Year	Title	Role	Notes
1964	Bewitched	Marvin "Monster" Grogan	Episode: "The Girl Reporter"
1964	The Baileys of Balboa	Norman	Episode: "Look Who's a Sailor"
1964	The Bing Crosby Show	Eddie Fox	2 episodes
1965	Rawhide	Billy Wallace	Episode: "The Calf Women"
1965–1967	Gunsmoke	Various roles	65 episodes
1967	The Mothers-in-Law	Carter Case	Episode: "Divorce: Mother-in-Law Style"
1970	Death Valley Days	Frank Harris	Episode: "Pioneer Pluck"
