= Gunsmoke (TV series) =

American Western television series (1955–1975)

- Genre: Western
- Based on: Gunsmoke by: John Meston; Norman Macdonnell
- Developed by: Charles Marquis Warren
- Starring: James Arness; Milburn Stone; Amanda Blake; Dennis Weaver; Burt Reynolds; Ken Curtis; Roger Ewing; Buck Taylor
- Theme music composer: Rex Koury; Glenn Spencer
- Country of origin: United States
- No. of seasons: 20
- No. of episodes: 635 (list of episodes)

Production
- Running time: 26 minutes (1955–1961); 50 minutes (1961–1975)
- Production companies: CBS Productions; Filmaster Productions; Arness and Company; (1959–1961); The Arness Production Company; (1961–1964)

Original release
- Network: CBS
- Release: September 10, 1955 – March 31, 1975

Related
- Gunsmoke franchise

Gunsmoke is an American Western television series that ran from September 10, 1955, to March 31, 1975, on CBS, with 635 total episodes. The first 12 seasons aired Saturdays at 10 pm (EST), seasons 13 through 16 aired Mondays at 7:30 pm, and the last four seasons aired Mondays at 8 pm.

During its second season in 1956, the program joined the list of the top 10 television programs broadcast in the United States. It quickly moved to number one and stayed there until 1961. It remained among the top 20 programs until 1964. From 1967 through 1973, it regained its top-10 rating status, dropping to 15 in the 1973–1974 season and finally to 26 in its final season. In all, it was number one for four seasons, and in the top 10 for 13 of its 20 seasons.

It is the second adult Western series to premiere, four days after The Life and Legend of Wyatt Earp. Airing for 20 seasons, it was the longest-running American primetime TV series until it was surpassed by The Simpsons.

== Premise ==
Set in Dodge City, Kansas during the years following the American Civil War, the series follows the lives of US Marshal Matt Dillon and the citizens he is sworn to protect. Among them are his deputies, Chester Goode, and later Festus Haggen, town physician Galen "Doc" Adams, and saloon owner, Miss Kitty Russell. Most episodes involve disruptions caused by those arriving from outside Dodge City. Since Dillon's authority extends beyond town, some episodes focus on his travels, while other plots revolve around mishaps occurring while Dillon is gone. Both deputies are shown to be loyal, but often inept or indecisive at handling problems when Dillon is not around. Although Dillon and Miss Kitty are never portrayed in a romantic relationship, it is apparent they care deeply for each other. Doc Adams is portrayed as a very competent and caring physician, but his conservative treatment methods often frustrate his patients who expect a quick recovery. Doc and both deputies are often used as comic relief over the course of the series.

As the series progressed, much less is seen of Matt Dillon. The series began to resemble an anthology with Dodge City as a backdrop for storylines around the show's guest stars.

== Cast ==
=== Main ===
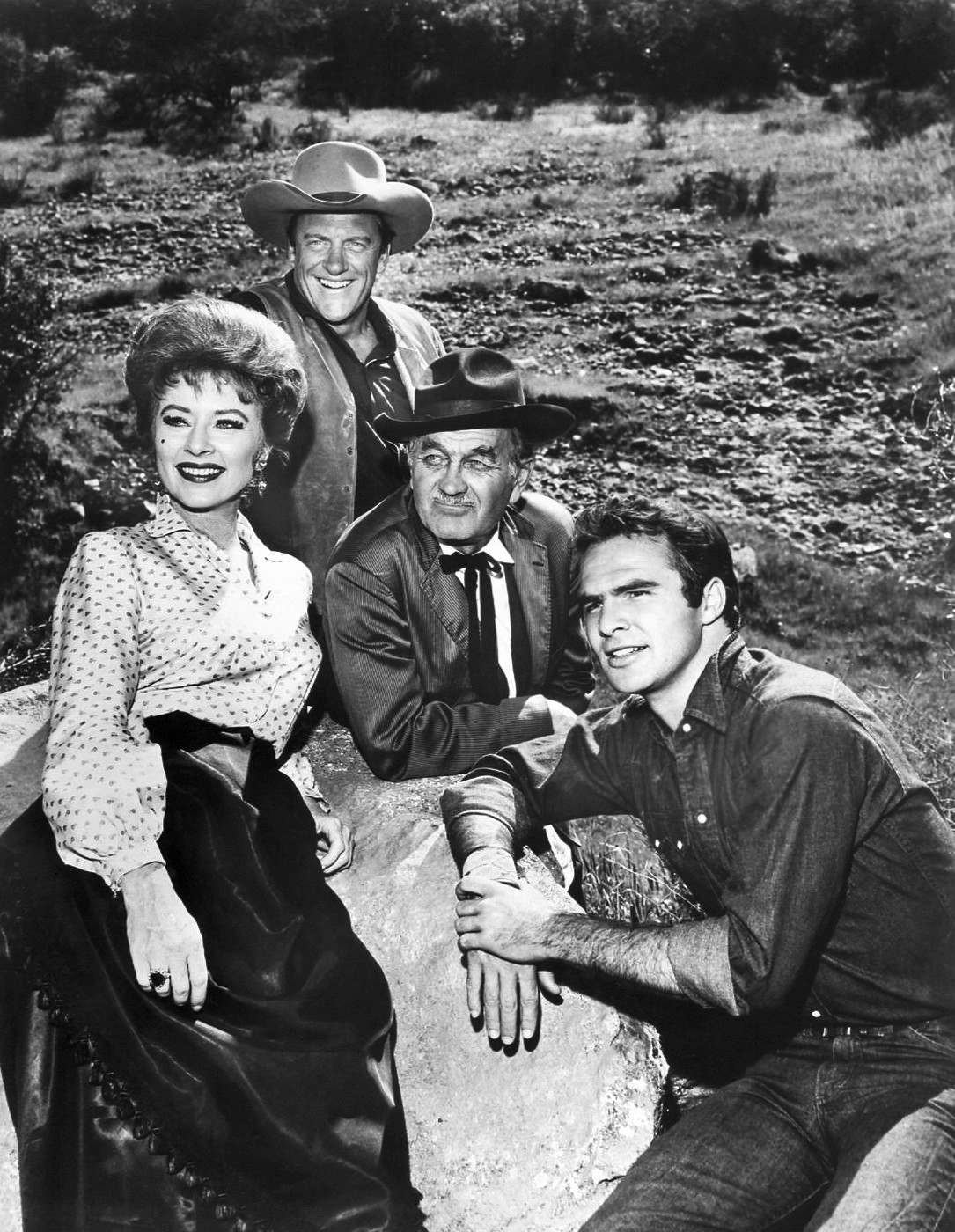
1963 cast

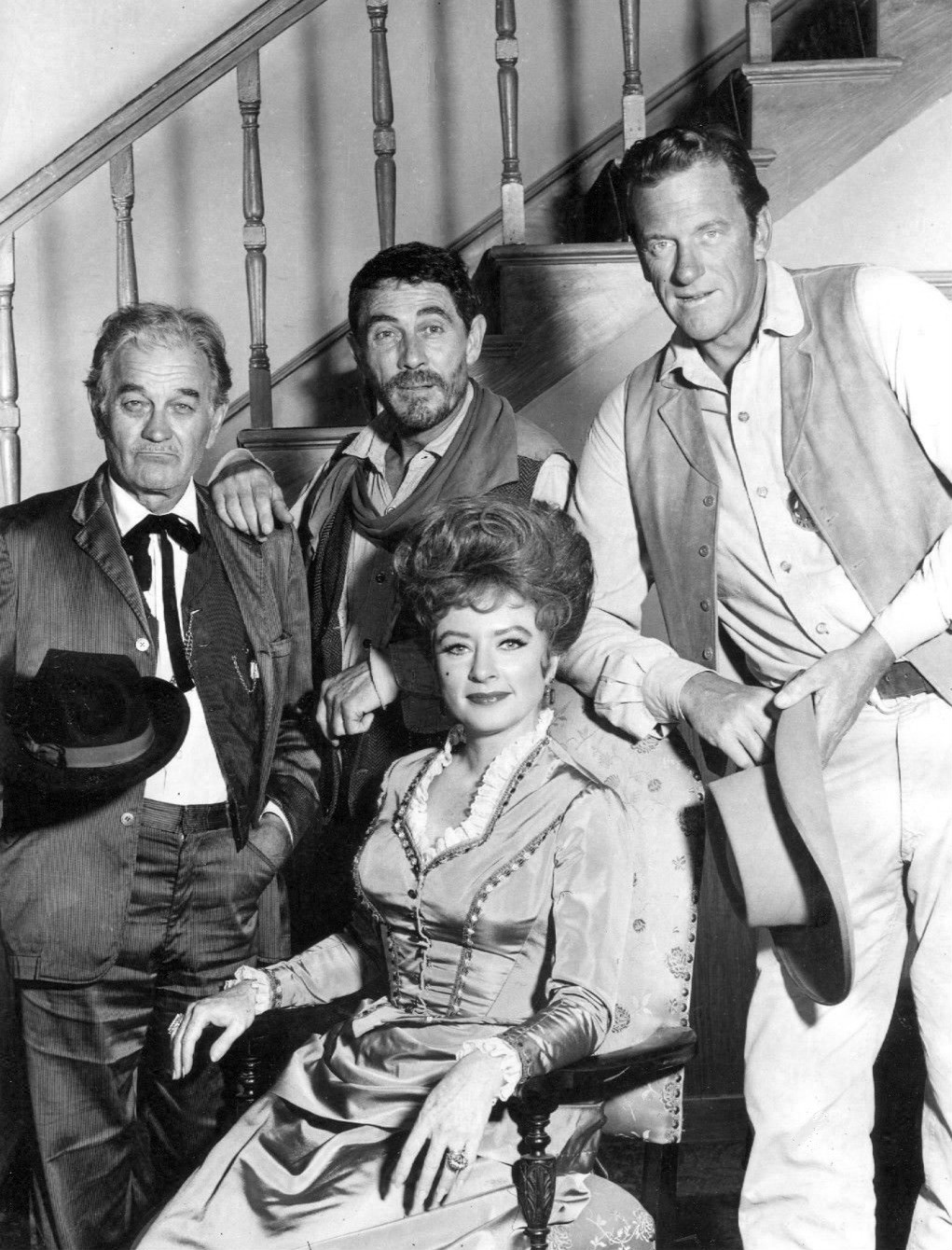
Clockwise from top: Ken Curtis (Festus), James Arness (Matt), Amanda Blake (Kitty), and Milburn Stone (Doc) in 1968

- James Arness as US Marshal Matt Dillon (1955–1975), the U.S. Marshal of Dodge City, Kansas, who works to preserve law and order in the western frontier of the 1870s.
- Milburn Stone as Galen "Doc" Adams (1955–1975)
- Amanda Blake as Kathleen "Kitty" Russell (1955–1974), owner of the Long Branch Saloon. Kitty's character type suggests a seductress by implication, but Blake's portrayal of the role gave it additional depth to avoid what might have otherwise been a stereotype. She played the role of an affectionate wife to Matt, and sister or mother to guest casts as necessary. Blake's Kitty remained her own person, echoing the culture's awareness of the liberated woman.
- Dennis Weaver as Chester B. Goode (1955–1964), Marshal Dillon's initial sidekick.
- Burt Reynolds as Quint Asper (1962–1965), deputy Marshal and blacksmith.
- Ken Curtis as Festus Haggen (1964–1975), deputy Marshal and Dillon's second sidekick.
- Roger Ewing as Thad Greenwood (1965–1967), deputy Marshal and handyman.
- Buck Taylor as Newly O'Brien (1967–1975), who served as deputy Marshal and doctor-in-training, having some studies in medicine through his uncle, which then continued under Doc Adams.

=== Recurring ===
- Dabbs Greer as Wilbur Jonas (1955–1963), storekeeper
- Howard Culver as Howie Uzzell (1955–1975), hotel clerk
- George Selk as Moss Grimmick (1955–1963), stableman
- Judson Pratt and Barney Phillips as Bill Pence (1955–1957; 1958–1961), Long Branch owner/co-owner
- Glenn Strange as Sam Noonan (1961–1973), Long Branch bartender
- James Nusser as Louie Pheeters (1961–1970), town drunk
- Sarah Selby as Ma Smalley (1961–1972), boardinghouse owner
- Hank Patterson as Hank Miller (1963–1975), stableman
- Roy Roberts as Mr. Bodkin (1963–1970), banker
- Charles Seel as Barney Danches (1965–1974), telegraph agent
- Roy Barcroft as Roy (1965–1969), townsperson
- Charles Wagenheim as Halligan (1966–1975), rancher
- Woody Chambliss as Mr. Lathrop (1966–1975), storekeeper
- Ted Jordan as Nathan Burke (1966–1975), freight agent
- Jonathan Harper as Percy Crump (1966–1972), undertaker
- Tom Brown as Ed O'Connor (1968–1972), rancher
- Herb Vigran as Judge Brooker (1970–1975):
- Pat Hingle as John Chapman (1971), doctor when Stone temporarily left for heart bypass surgery
- Fran Ryan as Miss Hannah (1974–1975), saloon owner

=== Guest stars ===
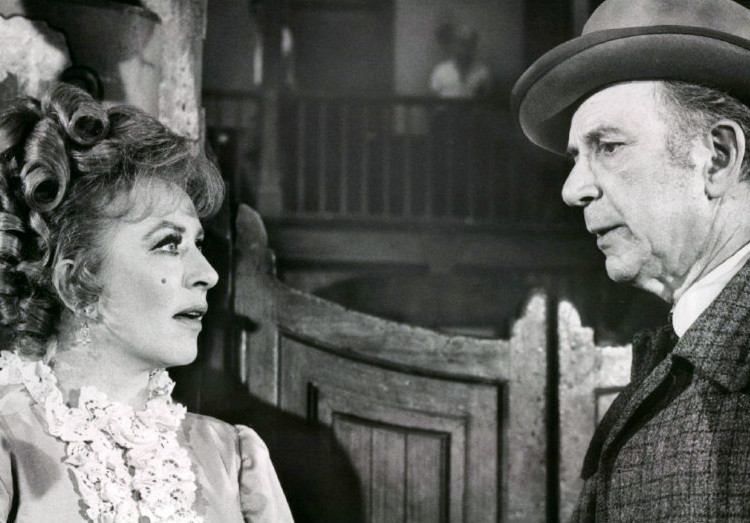
Amanda Blake and Jack Albertson, 1969

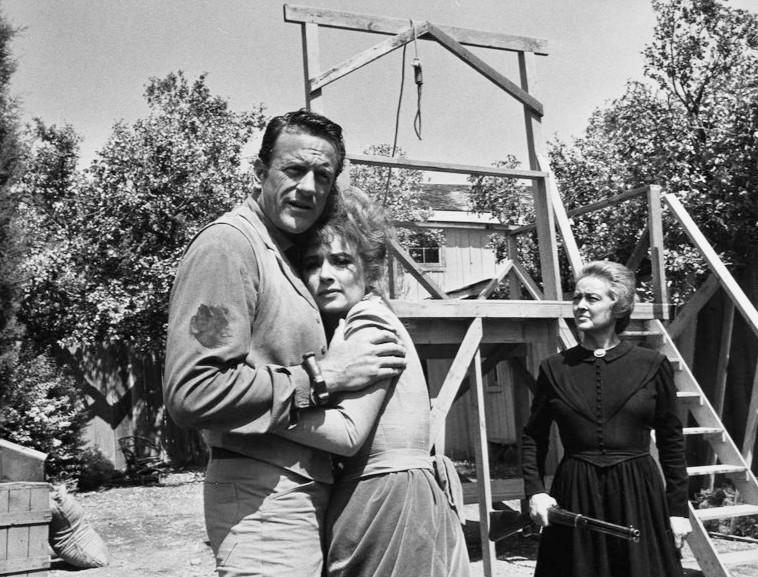
Guest star Bette Davis, 1966

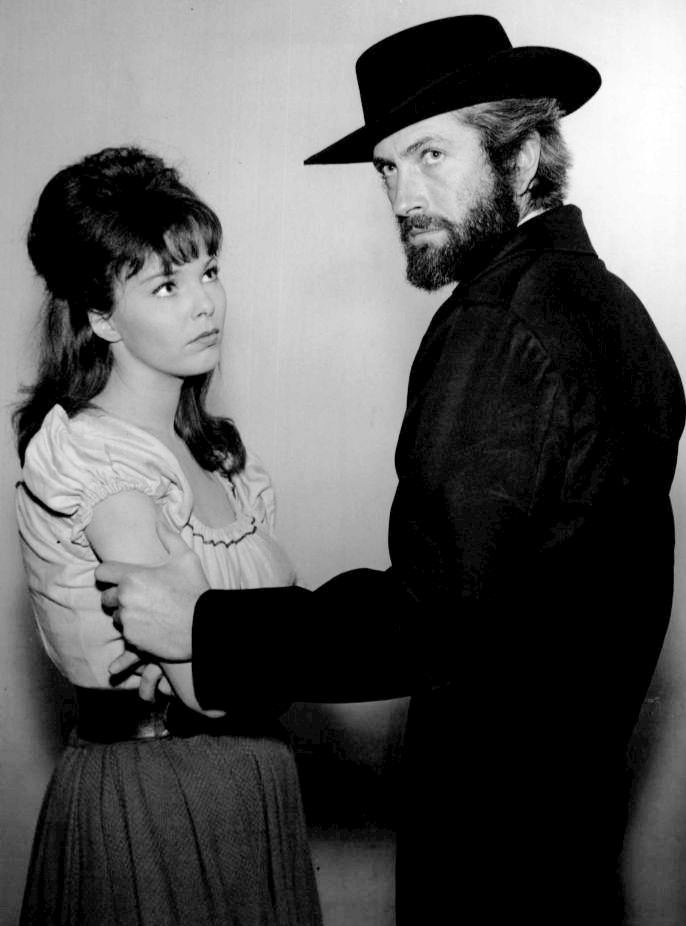
Guest stars Anne Helm and John Drew Barrymore, 1964

During its twenty-year run, Gunsmoke's guest stars included several Academy Award winners.

- Jack Albertson
- Ed Begley
- Ellen Burstyn
- Bette Davis
- Eileen Heckart
- Kim Hunter
- Ben Johnson
- George Kennedy
- Cloris Leachman
- Mercedes McCambridge

Several guest stars were Academy Award nominees.

- Jean Arthur
- Lew Ayres
- Ralph Bellamy
- Theodore Bikel
- Beulah Bondi
- Dyan Cannon
- Lynn Carlin
- Jack Cassidy
- Stanley Clements
- Lee J. Cobb
- Ellen Corby
- Nina Foch
- Vincent Gardenia
- Thomas Gomez
- Arthur Hunnicutt
- John Ireland
- Richard Jaeckel
- John Kerr
- John Marley
- Ron Moody
- J. Carrol Naish
- Nancy Olson
- Katharine Ross
- Alfred Ryder
- Cicely Tyson
- Jon Voight
- James Whitmore
- Chill Wills

Guest stars on the series also included Emmy Award winners.

- Jack Albertson
- Ed Asner
- Ellen Corby
- James Daly
- Cloris Leachman
- Michael Learned
- Kathleen Nolan
- Caroll O'Connor
- Milburn Stone
- Frank Sutton

Tony Award winning guest stars included:

- Ed Begley
- Ralph Bellamy
- Ellen Burstyn
- Vincent Gardenia
- Richard Kiley
- David Wayne
- Fritz Weaver

Several guest stars on Gunsmoke went on later to star in their own Westerns.

- Dan Blocker, Bonanza
- Charles Bronson, Empire, The Travels of Jaimie McPheeters
- Chuck Connors, The Rifleman, Branded
- Pat Conway, Tombstone Territory
- James Drury, The Virginian
- Andrew Duggan, Lancer
- Jack Elam, The Dakotas, Temple Houston
- Jack Kelly, Maverick
- Read Morgan, The Deputy
- Pernell Roberts, Bonanza
- Stuart Whitman, Cimarron Strip

== Episodes ==
Season	Episodes	Originally released		Rank	Rating	Viewers (millions)
Season	Episodes	First released	Last released	Rank	Rating	Viewers (millions)
1	39	September 10, 1955	August 25, 1956	—N/a	—N/a	—N/a
2	39	September 8, 1956	June 29, 1957	8	32.7 (Note: Tied with I've Got a Secret)	12.72
3	39	September 14, 1957	June 7, 1958	1	43.1	18.06
4	39	September 13, 1958	June 13, 1959	1	39.6	17.40
5	39	September 5, 1959	June 11, 1960	1	40.3	18.43
6	38	September 3, 1960	June 17, 1961	1	37.3	17.60
7	34	September 30, 1961	May 26, 1962	3	28.3	13.74
8	38	September 15, 1962	June 1, 1963	10	27.0	13.58
9	36	September 28, 1963	June 6, 1964	20	23.5	12.12
10	36	September 26, 1964	May 29, 1965	27	22.6	11.91
11	32	September 18, 1965	May 7, 1966	30	21.3	11.47
12	29	September 17, 1966	April 15, 1967	34	19.9	11.33
13	25	September 11, 1967	March 4, 1968	4	25.5 (Note: Tied with Family Affair and Bonanza)	14.45
14	26	September 23, 1968	March 24, 1969	6	24.9	14.50
15	26	September 22, 1969	March 23, 1970	2	25.9	15.15
16	24	September 14, 1970	March 8, 1971	5	25.5	15.32
17	24	September 13, 1971	March 13, 1972	4	26.0	16.14
18	24	September 11, 1972	March 5, 1973	8	23.6 (Note: Tied with The Mary Tyler Moore Show)	15.29
19	24	September 10, 1973	April 1, 1974	15	22.1	14.63
20	24	September 9, 1974	March 31, 1975	26	20.7	14.04
Television films		September 26, 1987	February 10, 1994	—N/a	—N/a	—N/a

== Background and production ==
=== Background ===
Gunsmoke began in 1952 as a radio series. In 1955, producer Norman Macdonnell, along with John Meston and Charles Marquis Warren decided to bring the series to television. The series launched with Warren as producer-director and Robert Stabler as executive producer.

The series was originally created by Filmaster at Columbia Studios. It would later be filmed at Paramount and James Arness would become producer and owner of the company.

=== Casting ===
John Wayne was originally offered the role of Matt Dillon, but he turned it down. Instead, Wayne recommended James Arness for the role. Arness had already appeared in several films, including The Thing. Arness's six-foot-six stature and rugged appearance personified the traditional image of the Western hero.

Amanda Blake, Dennis Weaver, and Milburn Stone were hired to fill out the cast. By the 1973–1974 season, Arness, Blake, and Stone were the only remaining original cast. Some characters came and went, others were replaced with similar characters.

=== Filming ===
The television series was filmed at the present site of California Lutheran University (CLU) and nearby Wildwood Regional Park in Thousand Oaks, California.

=== Music ===
The Gunsmoke radio theme song and later television theme is titled "Old Trails" and was composed by Glenn Spenser and Rex Koury. The theme followed the pattern of early television Westerns which relied on a set of predictable, unchanging clichés to create the distinctive "Western" sound. It features a slow, diatonic melody carried by strings and then guitar, laid over a steady "clip-clop" rhythm and timbre that mimics the sound of a horse's hooves.

The television version was thought to have been first conducted by CBS west coast music director Lud Gluskin. The lyrics of the theme, never aired on the radio or television show, were recorded and released by Tex Ritter in 1955. Ritter was backed on that Capitol record by Rex Koury and the radio Gunsmoke orchestra.

Other notable composers included:

- Elmer Bernstein
- Jerry Goldsmith
- Bernard Herrmann
- Jerome Moross
- Franz Waxman

=== Format ===
From 1955 to 1961, Gunsmoke was a half-hour show, retitled Marshal Dillon in syndication. It then went to an hour-long format. The series was retitled Gun Law in the UK. The Marshal Dillon syndicated reruns of half-hour episodes lasted from 1961 until 1964 on CBS, originally on Tuesday nights within its time in reruns.

=== Cancellation ===
"We didn't do a final, wrap-up show. We finished the 20th year, we all expected to go on for another season, or two or three. The (network) never told anybody they were thinking of cancelling."

— James Arness

In 1975, CBS made the decision not to renew Gunsmoke for a 21st season, without making any public announcement or informing the producers or cast members ahead of time. The entire cast was stunned by the cancellation, as they were unaware that CBS was considering it. The cast and crew read the news in the trade papers.

=== Spin-offs ===
Airing March 1 and March 8, 1971, the two-part episode "Pike" starring Jeanette Nolan became the pilot for a spinoff series, Dirty Sally. The series centered around Sally Fergus who was a wandering junk collector, and Cyrus Pike (Dack Rambo), an outlaw Sally teamed up with.

== Themes ==
The release of Gunsmoke in 1955, along with The Life and Legend of Wyatt Earp, is what most television historians consider to be the beginning of the "adult Western". (Note: Although Gunsmoke and Wyatt Earp are generally credited as the first adult Westerns with their premier in 1955, Death Valley Days preceded that by three years. TV Guide noted that "if the term adult western means a more mature western show than the standard goodies-and-baddies theme, then the syndicated Death Valley Days must be credited with having originated the idea several seasons before Gunsmoke".) Previous television versions of the genre had been focused on the youth demographic, as had the radio Westerns of the 1930s and 1940s. Gunsmoke producer Charles Marquis Warren indicated that Gunsmoke offered an adult approach to the Western genre. The hero iconography of the Western myth is evident in Gunsmoke's characterization Matt Dillon, representing the fictional Masterson-Earp-Hickok persona. Dillon as the embodiment of the Western hero possesses "the skill of the gunman, the moral rectitude of the Victorian hero, and the approachability of the common man".

The story-telling uses the family group format in a unique way. The characters are not exclusively family units, yet they are tied together in familial characteristics. The ranch or town represent the home as physical and social core; the characters represent family roles of parent and child; and the family values of loyalty, mutual affection, and trust are often a primary focus of character motivation. "The Gunsmoke 'family' contains within it all the familiar roles from father figure Matt and mother-mistress Kitty to scapegrace child Festus and stolid elder brother Doc." Dillon as the father figure is who the characters turn to when in need. He additionally fills the role of guardian and defender of the extended family of the town. In its setting, Gunsmoke retained the visual iconography that is characteristic to the Western, although altered from traditional forms because of what hero has become. The series moves away from the majestic panoramas of a Zane Grey; instead, we see little of the wilderness. The town is the home with the security of father figure Matt Dillon watching over it. When the viewer is greeted with wilderness views, it is usually to travel from one family setting to another. The series generally stayed away from the iconographic staple of the journey tale.

== Release ==
=== Broadcast ===
Gunsmoke premiered September 10, 1955, and until March 31, 1975, on CBS. Initially airing as 30-minute, black-and-white episodes, it aired Saturday nights, from 10:00-10:30 ET. Beginning with the 1961–1962 season, the show expanded to a 1-hour episode format. It remained in the Saturday night-time slot, from 10:00-11:00 ET. At the start of the 1967–1968 season, it moved to Monday nights, from 7:30-8:30 ET. Its final four seasons remained on Monday nights, from 8:00-9:00 ET.

When first-run, prime-time episodes of Gunsmoke expanded to a one-hour format in September 1961, CBS-TV reran the half-hour episodes under the title Marshal Dillon on Tuesday nights from 1961 through 1964 in the 7:30-8:00 time slot.

1950–1975 is considered the golden age of television Westerns, during which 119 Westerns appeared in prime time. Only two lasted more than 10 years, Bonanza and Gunsmoke. Gunsmoke ran for a total of 20 seasons, making it the longest running primetime series in the US until it was surpassed by The Simpsons. It continues to be one of the most popular streaming titles on subscription platforms Peacock and Paramount+, on ad-supported supported services like Pluto and Tubi, and on FAST channels.

=== Home media ===
In 2006, as part of Gunsmoke's 50th anniversary on television, selected episodes were released on DVD in three different box sets. Twelve episodes, from 1955 to 1964, were selected for the Gunsmoke: Volume I box set, and another twelve episodes, from 1964 to 1975, were selected for the Gunsmoke: Volume II box set. Both sets are also available as a combined single "Gift Box Set". A third unique DVD box set, known as Gunsmoke: The Directors Collection, was also released with 10 selected episodes from certain seasons throughout the series' 20-year history. All of these box sets are available on Region 1 DVD from Paramount Home Entertainment and CBS DVD.

Additionally, Paramount Home Entertainment and CBS DVD have released the series in its entirety on DVD for 13 years between 2007 and 2020 in Region 1 (all of the seasons except for season one and seasons sixteen through twenty were split into two volumes). A complete series box set was released on May 5, 2020. All DVDs have been released with English audio and close captioning from season 1 to 5 and starting season 6 English SDH.

DVD releases – Seasons 1–20

DVD name	Ep #	Release date
The First Season	39	July 17, 2007
The Second Season, Volume 1	20	January 8, 2008
The Second Season, Volume 2	19	May 27, 2008
The Third Season, Volume 1	19	December 9, 2008
The Third Season, Volume 2	20	May 26, 2009
The Fourth Season, Volume 1	19	October 5, 2010
The Fourth Season, Volume 2	20	December 14, 2010
The Fifth Season, Volume 1	20	October 11, 2011
The Fifth Season, Volume 2	19	December 13, 2011
The Sixth Season, Volume 1	19	August 7, 2012
The Sixth Season, Volume 2	19	October 16, 2012
The Seventh Season, Volume 1	17	December 11, 2012
The Seventh Season, Volume 2	17	February 5, 2013
The Eighth Season, Volume 1	19	May 7, 2013
The Eighth Season, Volume 2	19	May 7, 2013
The Ninth Season, Volume 1	18	August 6, 2013
The Ninth Season, Volume 2	18	August 6, 2013

DVD name	Ep #	Release date
The Tenth Season, Volume 1	18	August 12, 2014
The Tenth Season, Volume 2	18	August 12, 2014
The Eleventh Season, Volume 1	16	December 2, 2014
The Eleventh Season, Volume 2	16	December 2, 2014
The Twelfth Season, Volume 1	15	September 20, 2016
The Twelfth Season, Volume 2	14	September 20, 2016
The Thirteenth Season, Volume 1	15	May 22, 2018
The Thirteenth Season, Volume 2	10	May 22, 2018
The Fourteenth Season, Volume 1	15	February 5, 2019
The Fourteenth Season, Volume 2	11	February 5, 2019
The Fifteenth Season, Volume 1	15	October 1, 2019
The Fifteenth Season, Volume 2	11	October 1, 2019
The Sixteenth Season	24	December 10, 2019
The Seventeenth Season	24	December 10, 2019
The Eighteenth Season	24	February 4, 2020
The Nineteenth Season	24	February 4, 2020
The Final Season	24	May 5, 2020

== Reception ==
Gunsmoke was not an immediate television success. In 1955, it premiered on CBS in a Saturday night time slot against the popular The George Gobel Show and failed to make the top 15 its first season. The George Gobel Show, however, did not maintain its ratings for long, giving up ground to Gunsmoke, which had jumped to #8 in its second season. With Gunsmoke rising in the ratings, NBC moved The George Gobel Show to Tuesday nights, and Gunsmoke rose to dominate not only the Saturday night time slot, but was the #1 show on television for the next four years.

The expansion of the show to a one-hour format brought a decline in ratings.

The switch to color had not produced a ratings turnaround, and on February 23, 1967, The New York Times announced that CBS planned to cancel the series, even though the show was still producing an overall rating in the top 30 with 35% audience share. CBS president William Paley, who had greenlit Gunsmoke as a radio show for CBS in 1951, lobbied the network to keep the series on the air. In order to keep Gunsmoke on the air, CBS needed to clear an hour's worth of programming, and they cancelled Gilligan's Island and a new comedy, Doc, to make room for it.

A major change following the near-cancellation was to move the show to a new time slot. The show continued in its new time slot at 8pm on Mondays, which led to a spike in ratings. It remained in the top 15 for the next seven seasons. In the 1974–1975 season, the show's ratings dipped again, and although the ratings picked up in the second half of the season, CBS executive Fred Silverman cancelled Gunsmoke after 20 seasons on the air. Silverman cited ratings attrition as the reason for cancellation. Filling the slot were Mary Tyler Moore spin-offs Rhoda and Phyllis.

Dozens of television Westerns came and went during Gunsmoke's 20-year tenure, and Gunsmoke was the sole survivor.

=== Emmy awards ===
The series was nominate for a total of 15 Emmy awards and won a total of five.

Year (Note: Indicates the year of ceremony.)	Category	Nominee(s) / Work	Result
1956	Best Action or Adventure Series	Gunsmoke	Nominated
1957	Best Continuing Performance by an Actor in a Dramatic Series	James Arness	Nominated
1958	Best Continuing Performance by an Actor in a Leading Role in a Dramatic or Comedy Series	James Arness	Nominated
1958	Best Continuing Supporting Performance by an Actor in a Dramatic or Comedy Series	Dennis Weaver	Nominated
1958	Best Dramatic Series with Continuing Characters	Gunsmoke	Won
1958	Best Editing of a Film for Television	Mike Pozen for "How to Kill a Woman"	Won
1958	Best Teleplay Writing (Half-Hour or Less)	John Meston for "Born to Hang"	Nominated
1959	Best Actor in a Leading Role (Continuing Character) in a Dramatic Series	James Arness	Nominated
1959	Best Supporting Actor (Continuing Character) in a Dramatic Series	Dennis Weaver	Won
1959	Best Supporting Actress (Continuing Character) in a Dramatic Series	Amanda Blake	Nominated
1959	Best Western Series	Gunsmoke	Nominated
1966	Individual Achievements in Music - Composition	Morton Stevens for "Seven Hours to Dawn"	Nominated
1968	Outstanding Achievement in Musical Composition	Morton Stevens for "Major Glory"	Nominated
1968	Outstanding Performance by an Actor in a Supporting Role in a Drama	Milburn Stone	Won
1970	Outstanding Achievement in Film Sound Editing	Norman Karlin and Richard E. Raderman	Won (Note: Tied with Alex Bamattre, Michael Colgan, Douglas H. Grindstaff, Joe Kavigan, Bill Lee, and Josef E. Von Stroheim for ABC Movie of the Week: The Immortal)

=== Other accolades ===
- In TV Guide′s April 17, 1993, issue celebrating 40 years of television, the all-time-best-TV programs were chosen. "No contest, this [Gunsmoke] was the TV Western."
- Entertainment Weekly (February 19, 1999, issue) ranked the premiere of Gunsmoke as No. 47 in the "100 Greatest Moments in Television".
- Entertainment Weekly, in 1998, ranked Gunsmoke as No. 16 in The 100 Greatest TV Shows of all time.
- In a 1998 TV Guide poll of 50,000, Gunsmoke was ranked as CBS's best Western and James Arness was ranked as CBS's best "Gunslinger".
- In 1997, the episode "The Jailer" was ranked No. 28 on TV Guide's 100 Greatest Episodes of All Time.
- In 2002, TV Guide ranked Gunsmoke as No. 40 in the 50 greatest television shows of all time.
- In 2013, TV Guide ranked it as #27 on their list of the 60 Best Series.
- In 2013, the Writers Guild of America ranked Gunsmoke as #84 on their list of the 101 Best Written TV Series.

== Bibliography ==
- Atkinson, Brooks. "Critic at Large : Marshall Matt Dillion Survives 13 Years of Once-a-Week Incidents in Dodge." New York Times, May 22, 1964, p. 32..
- Atkinson, Brooks. "Critic at Large : The Dedicated World of ’Gunsmoke" Has Values that Transcend Mere Ratings." New York Times, November 10, 1964, p. 44.
- Barabas, SuzAnn; Barabas, Gabor (1990). Gunsmoke: A Complete History and Analysis of the Legendary Broadcast Series. Jefferson, North Carolina: McFarland & Company, Inc. ISBN 0899504183.
- Brooks, Tim; Marsh, Earle F. (2007). The Complete Directory to Prime Time Network and Cable TV Shows, 1946-Present (9th ed.). New York: Ballantine Books. ISBN 978-0-345-49773-4.
- Greenland, David R. (2013). The Gunsmoke Chronicles: A New History of Television's Greatest Western. Albany, Georgia: BearManor Media. ISBN 978-1593938765.
- Leonard, Kendra Preston; Whitmer, Marianna, eds. (2018). Re-Locating the Sounds of the Western. New York: Routledge. ISBN 978-1-351-33415-0.
- MacDonald, J. Fred (1987). Who Shot the Sheriff?: The Rise and Fall of the Television Western. New York: Praeger. ISBN 978-0-275-92326-6.
- McNeil, Alex (1996). Total Television: the Comprehensive Guide to Programming from 1948 to the Present (4th ed.). New York: Penguin Books. ISBN 0-14-02-6737-9.
- Magers, Boyd; Nareau, Bob; Copeland, Bobby (2005). Best of the Badmen: Polecats, Varmints, and Desperadoes of Western Films. Madison, North Carolina: Empire Publishing. ISBN 978-0-944019-43-6.
- Marill, Alvin H. (June 1, 2011). Television Westerns: Six Decades of Sagebrush Sheriffs, Scalawags, and Sidewinders. Plymouth, UK: Scarecrow Press. ISBN 978-0-8108-8133-4.
- Maulhardt, Jeffrey Wayne (2010). Conejo Valley. Arcadia Publishing. ISBN 978-0738580395.
- Parks, Rita (1982). The Western Hero in Film and Television: Mass Media Mythology. Ann Arbor, Michigan: UMI Research Press. ISBN 978-0-8357-1287-3.
- Schuster, Hal (1989). The Gunsmoke Years. Las Vegas, Nevada: Pioneer Books. ISBN 1-55698-221-6.
- Shubilla, Thom (2022). Primetime 1966-1967: The Full Spectrum of Television's First All-Color Season. Jefferson, North Carolina: McFarland & Company. ISBN 978-1-4766-8344-7.
- Stanley, Jack Ross. "A History of the Radio and Television Western Dramatic Series 'Gunsmoke', 1952-1973," (PhD dissertation, University of Michigan; ProQuest Dissertations & Theses, 1973. 7415864).
- Stone, Robert (2011). Day Hikes Around Ventura County. Day Hike Books. ISBN 978-1573420624.
- Thomas, Bob (July 4, 2002). "Arness still loves 'Gunsmoke'". Deseret News.
- West, Richard (1987). Television Westerns: Major and Minor Series, 1946-1978. Jefferson, North Carolina: McFarland & Company. ISBN 0-7864-0579-1.
- Yoggy, Gary A. (1995). Riding the Video Range: The Rise and Fall of the Western on Television. Jefferson, North Carolina: McFarland & Company. ISBN 978-0-7864-0021-8.
- Hampes, William (March 11, 2019). Cowboy Courage: Westerns and the Portrayal of Bravery. McFarland. ISBN 978-1-4766-3523-1.
