= Harry Harris (director) =

American director (1922–2009)

- Born: Harry Harris; September 8, 1922; Kansas City, Missouri, US
- Died: March 19, 2009 (aged 86); Los Angeles, California, US
- Resting place: Los Angeles
- Other name: Harry Harris Jr.
- Height: 5' 11'
- Children: 2

Harry Harris (September 8, 1922 – March 19, 2009) was an American television and film director.

Harris moved to Los Angeles in 1937 and got a mailroom job at Columbia Studios. After attending UCLA, he became an apprentice sound cutter, assistant sound effects editor, and then an assistant film editor at Columbia Pictures. He enlisted in the Army Air Forces at the start of World War II, and as part of the First Motion Picture Unit, reported to Hal Roach Studios in Culver City. His supervisor there was Ronald Reagan, who hired him as sound effects editor for training and combat films.

At the end of World War II, Harris became an assistant film editor and then an editor for Desilu, the studio of Desi Arnaz and Lucille Ball. Over the next five decades, he directed hundreds of TV episodes, with significant contributions to Gunsmoke, Eight is Enough, The Waltons, 7th Heaven (TV series) and Falcon Crest. He won an Emmy Award for directing a 1982 episode of Fame ("To Soar and Never Falter"). He was later nominated for two other Emmy Awards and a Directors Guild of America Award.

== Death ==
Harris died March 19, 2009, in Los Angeles of complications of myelodsplasia. He was 86. He was survived by his wife, Patty; daughters, Joanne, a hairstylist and Suzanne; and a stepson, Michael Daruty, an NBC Universal exec. Services were held Wednesday, March 25, 2009, at 2:00 p.m., at Hillside Memorial Park.
