= The Brothers =

The Brothers may refer to:

== Geography ==
- The Brothers (islands), Hong Kong, East and West, in the mouth of the Pearl River
- The Brothers (islands), New Zealand in Cook Strait
- The Brothers, the collective name for Motungārara Island / Fishermans Island and Tahoramaurea Island / Browns Island
- The Brothers (Olympic Mountains), a mountain in the United States
- The Brothers (San Francisco Bay), two islands, East and West, in California
- The Brothers (Andaman and Nicobar Islands), India
- The Brothers, the collective name for the islands of Darsah and Samhah

== Arts, entertainment, and media ==
=== Films ===
- The Brothers (1947 film), a British melodrama
- The Brothers (1973 film), aka The Kung Fu Brothers, a Hong Kong film directed by Chan Tung-Man
- The Brothers (1979 film), a Hong Kong film produced by Shaw Brothers Studios
- The Brothers (2001 film), an American romantic comedy
- The Brothers, a 2006 Irish television documentary short nominated for a 2007 Irish Film and Television Award

=== Literature ===
- The Brothers (Shirley play), a 1653 play by James Shirley
- The Brothers (Young play), a 1728 play by Edward Young
- The Brothers (Cumberland play), a 1769 play by Richard Cumberland
- The Brothers (novella), a novella by C. J. Cherryh
- "The Brothers" (short story), a 1937 short story by John Cheever
- The Brothers, a 2006 play by Angie Le Mar
- The Brothers, a novel by Leonard Strong, basis for the 1947 film
- The Brothers, a novella by H. G. Wells
- Adelphoe (The Brothers), a 160 BC play by Terence
- The Brothers (Kinzer book), a 2013 book by Stephen Kinzer

=== Music ===
==== Groups and labels ====
- The Brothers (band), a 1970s UK musical group
- The Brothers, a 1970s disco group produced by Warren Schatz
- Family Force 5, formerly The Brothers, an American Christian crunkcore band
- The Brothers, a reunion supergroup consisting of the surviving members of The Allman Brothers Band

==== Albums ====
- The Brothers (album) an album by Stan Getz and Zoot Sims
- The Brothers!, a 1956 album by Al Cohn, Bill Perkins and Ritchie Kamuca
- The Brothers: Isley, an album by The Isley Brothers

==== Songs ====
- "The Brothers", by Momus from his 2016 album Scobberlotchers

=== Radio ===
- The Brothers (radio show), a UK radio programme

=== Television ===
==== Episodes ====
- "The Brothers", Cade's County episode 15 (1972)
- "The Brothers", Combat! season 5, episode 4 (1966)
- "The Brothers", Danger Man series 1, episode 25 (1961)
- "The Brothers", Dixon of Dock Green series 15, episode 5 (1968)
- "The Brothers", Doc Elliot episode 13 (1974)
- "The Brothers", Gunsmoke season 11, episode 25 (1966)
- "The Brothers", Gunsmoke season 18, episode 12 (1972)
- "The Brothers", Have Gun – Will Travel season 5, episode 11 (1961)
- "The Brothers", Matlock season 5, episode 9 (1990)
- "The Brothers", Mission: Impossible (1966) season 4, episode 11 (1969)
- "The Brothers", Outlaws (1960) season 1, episode 25 (1961)
- "The Brothers", Proesstraat season 2, episode 15 (2011)
- "The Brothers", Shazam! episode 2 (1974)
- "The Brothers", Special Unit 2 season 1, episode 1 (2002)
- "The Brothers", The Adventures of Jim Bowie season 2, episode 31 (1958)
- "The Brothers", The Adventures of Robin Hood series 1, episode 19 (1956)
- "The Brothers", The Count of Monte Cristo (1956) episode 25 (1956)
- "The Brothers", The Virginian season 4, episode 1 (1965)
- "The Brothers", Trackdown season 1, episode 31 (1958)
- "The Brothers", Whirlybirds season 2, episode 5 (1958)

==== Shows ====
- The Brothers (1956 TV series), an American sitcom about the owners of a photography studio
- The Brothers (1972 TV series), a British drama about a road haulage company
- The Brothers (1980 TV series), a Hong Kong TV series
- The Brothers, a UK comedy starring Jason Barrett
- Tawan Tud Burapha (The Brothers), a 2015 Thai TV series

== Other uses ==
- The Brothers (ship), a schooner wrecked near Tasmania in 1816
- The Brothers (ferry), a 19th-century Manly-to-Sydney ferry in Australia
- The Brothers, a football club in Hoofdklasse (Suriname)

== See also ==
- The Bruthers (garage rock band), a 1960s American group
- Brothers (disambiguation)
- Band of Brothers (disambiguation)
- Brother (disambiguation)
- Brotherhood (disambiguation)
