= Sisterhood =

Sisterhood or The Sisterhood may refer to:

== Family, relationships, and organizations ==
- Sister, a female sibling
- Sisterhood (feminism), solidarity between women in the context of sexual discrimination
- Sister (Christian), the title used for a nun in certain monastic orders
- Lay sister, a woman who has taken religious vows and habit but is employed in her order chiefly in manual labor

== Literature ==
- The Sisterhood, a 1977 novel by Betty Black and Casey Bishop, basis for the 1986 film The Ladies Club
- The Sisterhood, a 1982 novel by Michael Palmer
- The Sisterhood, a 1998 novel by Raymond Harold Sawkins, written as Colin Forbes; the fifteenth installment in the Tweed & Co. series
- The Sisterhood: How a Network of Black Women Writers Changed American Culture by Courtney Thorsson
- The Sisterhood: The Secret History of Women at the CIA by Liza Mundy

== Film ==
- The Sisterhood of the Traveling Pants (2005 film) an American film directed by Ken Kwapis
- The Sisterhood (1988 film), an American film directed by Cirio H. Santiago
- The Sisterhood (2004 film), an American film directed by David DeCoteau
- Sisterhood (2008 film), a British-New Zealand film directed by Richard Wellings-Thomas
- Sisterhood (2016 film), a Macanese-Hong Kong film directed by Tracy Choi
- Sisterhood (2019 film), also known as Ainsi soient-elles, a Canadian documentary film directed by Maxime Faure
- Sisterhood (2021 film), a Macedonian drama film written and directed by Dina Duma
- Sisterhood (2026 film), an upcoming South Korean mystery-thriller film written and directed by Yoon Eun-kyoung

== Music ==
- The Sisterhood (gothic rock band), a short-lived English band
- The Sisterhood (American band), a country music duo
- "Sister Hoods" (song), a 2011 tune off the soundtrack to the 2011 U.S. animated film Hoodwinked Too! Hood vs. Evil

== Television ==
=== TV shows ===
- The Sisterhood (TV series), a 2013 American reality television show about preachers' wives on TLC
- The Sisterhood: Becoming Nuns (TV series), a 2014 American reality television series on Lifetime
- Dune: The Sisterhood (TV series), former name of the 2020s American science fiction TV show Dune: Prophecy on HBO Max
- Sisterhood (2023 series), a 2023 Chinese TV series about Samsui women in Singapore

=== TV episodes ===
- "Sisterhood" (Once Upon a Time), an episode
- "Sisterhood" (Robin Hood), an episode

== Other uses ==
- Sister-hood, an online magazine edited by Deeyah Khan
- Sisterhoods (Modern Anglican)
- Sisterhood F.C., London, England, UK; a women's soccer team
- Sorority, a social organization for undergraduate students
- "Sororité", a tableau during the 2024 Summer Olympics opening ceremony

== See also ==
- Sisters (disambiguation)
- Brotherhood (disambiguation)
