= Booby and Booba =

- Genre: Toddlers
- Created by: Arik Caspi and Ron Issak
- Directed by: Arik Caspi
- Voices of: Ofek Moshe, Daria Lior-shoshani, Gitit Shoval, Ron Druian, Gadi Levi, Sagit Shamir, Shauli Halevi, Beth Charmels
- Music by: Ron Druyan, Getit Shoval
- Country of origin: Israel
- Original language: Hebrew (Dubbed into several languages including English)
- No. of seasons: 1
- No. of episodes: 52

Production
- Producers: Arik Caspi, Ron Druian, Zvika Arav, Shai Goldman, Oren Cristal
- Cinematography: Shai Goldman
- Editor: Aran Amir
- Running time: 6 minutes
- Production companies: A.C. Pictures; Hed Arzi

Original release
- Network: BabyTV
- Release: 2003 – 2009

Booby and Booba (Hebrew: בובי ובובה, Bubi ve Buba) (Note: Booby and Booba have also been translated as "Bobby and Boba", "Bobby and Bubba" or "Bobby and the Doll") It is a 52-episode Israeli TV show for toddlers aged 1–4 that was based on an Israeli children's video titled Booby Goes for a Walk: The Laughing Baaby, both which later begain airing in 2003 on BabyTV, and later began airing on July 4, 2005 internationally on BabyTV and The series was produced by the Israeli production company A.C. Pictures. A musical play was subsequently created based on this series.

== Plot ==
Booby and Booba are a brother and sister pair who live in a lively world of puppets. In each episode, Booby and Booba meet different characters from the audience who describe themselves through song, with the assistance of friends in the background providing backing vocals,

== Home media ==
The series was distributed by Hed Arzi on VHS, DVD and CD (Songs from the show) in Israel.
