= Band of Brothers =

Band of Brothers may refer to:

== Use as a phrase ==
- "We few, we happy few, we band of brothers", from the St Crispin's Day Speech in Shakespeare's Henry V
- Nelson's band of brothers, Nelson's captains at the 1798 Battle of the Nile, later all the men under his command

== Arts and entertainment ==
=== Literature and television ===
- Band of Brothers (book), by Stephen E. Ambrose, 1992
- Band of Brothers (miniseries), a 2001 TV miniseries based on the book
- Band of Brothers, a 1973 aviation adventure novel by Ernest K. Gann
- Band of Brothers, a 2006 nautical war novel in The Bolitho novels series by Alexander Kent
- Band of Brothers (South Korean TV program), a 2008–09 music show

=== Music ===
- Band of Brothers (Hellyeah album), 2012
- Band of Brothers (Willie Nelson album), 2014
- Band of Brothers (Only Men Aloud! album), 2009
- Band of Brothers (Brian Tarquin album), 2017
- Band of Brothers (Warmen album), 2025
- "Band of Brothers", a song by Dierks Bentley from the 2006 album Long Trip Alone

== See also ==
- "The Bonnie Blue Flag", a song also known as "We Are a Band of Brothers"
- Brotherhood (disambiguation)
- Brothers (disambiguation)
- The Brothers (disambiguation)
- Fraternity (disambiguation)
