= Faery in Shadow =

1993 novel by C. J. Cherryh

- First edition cover (British trade paperback)
- Author: C. J. Cherryh
- Cover artist: Bruce Pennington
- Language: English
- Genre: Fantasy
- Published: 1993 (Legend Books)
- Publication place: United Kingdom
- Media type: Print (trade paperback)
- Pages: 249
- ISBN: 0-09-926721-7
- Preceded by: "The Brothers"

Faery in Shadow is a fantasy novel by American writer C. J. Cherryh. It was first published in the United Kingdom by Legend Books in August 1993 in trade paperback, and the first United States edition was published by Ballantine Books under its Del Rey Books imprint in November 1993 in hardcover. It was nominated for the Locus Award for Best Fantasy Novel in 1994.

Faery in Shadow is a sequel to Cherryh's novella "The Brothers", which was first published in her 1986 collection of short fiction, Visible Light, and is based in part on Celtic mythology, featuring such creatures as the fay race of the Sídhe, including pooka. Its setting is suffused with magical forces and supernatural beings, marking it as an example of the high fantasy literary subgenre. Cherryh also borrows elements from horror fiction for the book.

A major revision of Faery in Shadow entitled Faery Moon, with a new copyright, was self-published by Cherryh as an e-book in December 2009.

== The realm of Faery ==
C. J. Cherryh's Faery is an alternate plane of existence where the Sidhe live, separate from, but still connected to, the mortal realm of humans. Long ago the Sidhe lived alongside man, tolerant of his indiscretions, but with time, as man's abuse of Nature increased and his respect for the Sidhe diminished, the Sidhe began withdrawing to Faery.

The Sidhe are generally free to "step" in and out of Faery at will, but only a select few mortals have that privilege (or misfortune), and then normally under the control of a fay. The Sidhe work with silver, but abhor iron.

Broadly there are two types of Sidhe, the "bright" Sidhe, which include the Fair Folk, or Daoine, and the "dark" Sidhe, including pooka and others. The dark Sidhe are often old creatures that have been corrupted by evil and then won back by the bright Sidhe, and are normally bound to the bright ones by bargains and geas.

Contrary to the popular notion that all fairies are good, the Sidhe are "practical" and will do whatever is necessary to achieve their goals, even at the expense of mortals. They speak in riddles and are forever striking bargains, which they stick to, to the letter. The dark Sidhe in particular are mischievous and enjoy playing tricks on humans. When it suits them, the Sidhe can take complete control of mortals. They can heal them, put them to sleep, touch their dreams and steal time from them.

== Plot summary ==
Caith mac Sliabhin, condemned by the Sidhe in "The Brothers" for committing patricide, wanders along the river Guagach, accompanied and tormented by Dubhain, a mischievous pooka. Their journey takes them to Gleann Fiain where a beast from the river chases Caith up a hill to an isolated cottage. The occupants, twins Ceannann and Firinne, let Caith and Dubhain in and allow them to spend the night. Unbeknown to Caith, the birth of the twins 21 years ago set in motion a sequence of events that damned Gleann Fiain and cast a shadow over Faery.

The twins were born to Fianna, queen of Gleann Fiain in Dun Glas. But unbeknown to her husband, Ceannann mac Ceannann, Fianna was unable to conceive and had sought help from a wise-women, Moragacht. Moragacht struck a bargain with her, promising her twins if she lay down with a selkie, in exchange for one of the twins when they were born. But when the twins arrived (a human and a selkie) and Moragacht came to claim one of them, Fianna denied any knowledge of her, and mac Ceannann turned Moragacht away. From that day onwards, grief and misery struck the family, and mac Ceannann and Fianna were forced to vacate Dun Glas and flee with the twins to an abandoned hilltop fortress. But the loch beast, under Moragacht's control, found them there and killed them all, except the twins, now aged 14, who escaped to the cottage. The witch then seized control of Dun Glas from where she damned all of Gleann Fiain.

But the wards that had protected the cottage from Moragacht fall when Caith and Dubhain arrive. Riders from Dun Glas come and capture the twins. Caith and Dubhain (as a horse) give chase, but as they approach the riders, Dubhain is overcome by the witch's magic and falls into the loch, abandoning Caith. Caith and the twins are taken to Dun Glas where they are locked in cells bordering the loch. Caith lapses into a dream where he enters the loch to find Dubhain duelling with the loch beast. He draws Dubhain back to his cell, who in turn calls Nuallan from Faery, the bright Sidhe controlling their destinies. Nuallan gives Caith a silver key to unlock the iron cells and so lifts a spell enabling Nuallan to cast Caith, Dubhain and the twins out of Dun Glas. Moragacht allows her prisoners to escape because with her magic she now holds Nuallan, a bigger catch and her means to controlling Faery.

The twins lead Caith and Dubhain to the ruins of the hilltop fortress, their former home. There they make a fire with the remains of a staircase, but a ghost appears out of the smoke that transports Caith back to the night of the fall of the fortress and into the body of Padraic, head of mac Ceannann's household. There he relives the last few hours of the family until he is killed by the beast. Firinne retrieves one of the burning timbers from the fire as a keepsake, and the twins set off for the sea to search for their selkie father, with Caith and Dubhain in pursuit. Caith finds the selkie first, a whale floundering on the beach. But when the selkie shapeshifts to a man, he is killed by one of Moragacht's pursuing riders. In the ensuing confusion, Caith accidentally kills Ceannann. Firinne is devastated by the loss of her twin brother and gives Caith her keepsake from the fortress. Then, revealing her selkie birth, she changes into a whale and heads out to sea.

Caith rides Dubhain back to Dun Glas to free Nuallan. Once again Dubhain is weakened by the witch's spells and Caith has to enter the keep on his own. He sees Nuallan helpless in his cell, but Nuallan asks him to unlock it with the silver key Caith unknowingly still had all this time, the key that would have given Moragacht access to Faery. Nuallan takes the key and flees the keep, leaving Caith to fend for himself. Moragacht, furious at the loss of the Sidhe, prepares to deal with Caith, but he throws the charred piece of wood Firinne gave him into the fireplace which releases Padraic, the ghost from the hilltop fortress. In an act of revenge, it begins destroying Dun Glas and all in it. With the witch's spell now diminishing, Dubhain rescues Caith from the keep, while in the loch a whale from the sea turns on the beast. The shadow over Faery lifts and Caith and Dubhain resume their travels.

== Characters ==
=== Humans ===
- Caith mac Sliabhin – son of Sliabhin, whom he killed in "The Brothers"; exiled into the wilderness by the Sidhe, who have damned him for committing patricide
- Ceannann mac Ceannann – former king of Gleann Fiain in Dun Glas; the twins Ceannann and Firinne's human father
- Fianna – former queen of Gleann Fiain in Dun Glas; Ceannann and Firinne's birth mother; accepted, but broke, a bargain with Moragacht to have the twins
- Padraic – head of mac Ceannann's household whose ghost resides in the charred remains of mac Ceannann's hilltop fortress
- Ceannann – Firinne's twin brother

=== Sidhe ===
- Nuallan – an elf of the Fair Folk, the Bright or Daoine Sidhe; directs the destinies of Caith and Dubhain
- Dubhain – a mischievous shapeshifting pooka of the Dark Sidhe; rescued from the earth gods by the Bright Sidhe and now obliged to serve them and accompany Caith on his wanderings
- The Selkie of Corrigh (Lord of Corrigh) – a selkie of the sun-born Sidhe; Ceannann and Firinne's birth father
- Firinne – Ceannann's twin sister; a selkie, but not known to her until her brother dies and she sheds her human form to become a whale

=== Other ===
- Moragacht – a witch who draws on the magic and corruption of the ancient earth gods; queen of Dun Glas who cursed the keep and the surrounding Gleann Fiain
- Great Dark One – an ancient beast residing in Loch Fiain and under Moragacht's control

== Draiocht and geas ==
Draiocht and geas (black sorcery and dire Necessity) are the two forces that drive Faery in Shadow. Caith is bound by geas to the Sidhe for committing patricide and is obliged to serve them. Dubhain, already serving the bright Sidhe, is also bound to Caith by geas because of his own past indiscretions. Thus Caith and Dubhain, like inseparable twins, have their destinies ruled by the bright Sidhe.

Geassi binds the draiocht of the worlds and the bright Sidhe keep the draiocht in balance. But Moragacht the witch defies the Sidhe by waking the ancient earth gods and practising stone magic, which disturbs Faery and its delicate balances. But to work magic requires giving something to the powers from where the magic comes, and the greater the magic, the greater the gift must be. Moragacht draws her magic from the earth powers, the banished gods, but her real desire is to control Faery, and Nuallan is her gift in exchange for this sorcery. However, the exchange cannot happen until Nuallan consents, until he accepts and worships the stone gods.

Moragacht wears Nuallan down with her dark magic, but Caith and Dubhain rescue him, each for their own reasons and in spite of the grief he has caused them. Caith recognises and is frightened by these old and hungry gods the witch is courting, and Dubhain, a dark creature himself, feels the temptation of these dark powers trying to claim him back.

== Faery Moon ==
In May 2009, Cherryh announced that she was revising large parts of Faery in Shadow for e-book publication. As the work would be considerably altered, it was given a new title and a new copyright was obtained. In December 2009 Cherryh self-published the revised work in an e-book volume entitled Faery Moon, which included a minor revision of Faery in Shadow's prequel, "The Brothers", an afterword by Jane Fancher, a Faery lexicon and other notes.

=== Background ===
Cherryh was never happy with the way Faery in Shadow was published. She had originally entitled it Caith, and while still in rough draft, her editor at the time, Lester del Rey died, throwing Del Rey Books into crisis. Under pressure to publish Cherryh's book, the new editors requested a copy of her draft, which she reluctantly gave them. They were not happy with it, calling it too "dark". Then a lightning strike at Cherryh's house corrupted the original copy of the draft on her computer, and before she had a chance to rebuild the damaged file, Del Rey decided to take the book to print. They did their own copyediting and changed the title. Delays in the United States resulted in the first edition of Faery in Shadow being published in the United Kingdom, while the distribution of the book in America, according to Cherryh, was "abysmal".

When Cherryh recovered the rights to Faery in Shadow, she decided to rewrite it the way she had originally intended it to be. She made use of both the published version of the story and her draft before the editors had started making changes. While she left the plot and characters of Faery in Shadow unchanged, Cherryh rewrote large sections of the prose and infused Caith and Dubhain's speech with a Celtic dialect.

== Reviews ==
- Bradley, Wendy (August 1994). "Review of Faery in Shadow". Locus. Vol. 33, no. 2. p. 62.
- Brown, Tanya (November 1994). "Review of Faery in Shadow". Vector. No. 181. p. 18.
- Miller, Faren (January 1994). "Review of Faery in Shadow". Locus. Vol. 32, no. 1. p. 49.
- Thomason, Sue (February 1994). "Review of Faery in Shadow". Vector. No. 177. p. 20.
- Underwood, Laura J (April 9, 1995). "Three Magic Trips Should Please Enjoyers of Fantasy. Review of Faery in Shadow". Knoxville News Sentinel. p. F6.
