= Saint Crispin's Day =

(25 October) the feast day of the Christian saints Crispin and Crispinian

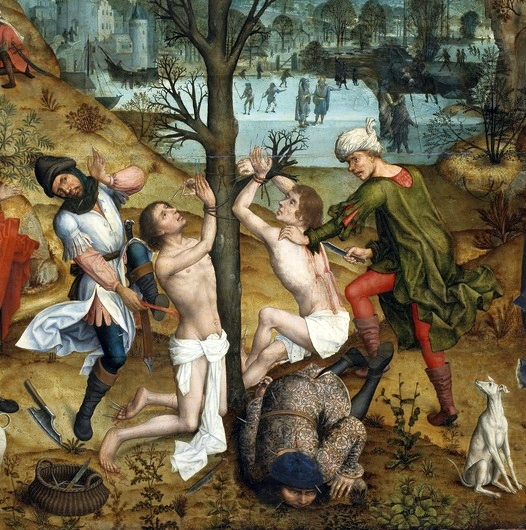
Martyrdom of Crispin and Crispinian (detail), by Aert van den Bossche, 1494

Saint Crispin's Day, or the Feast of Saint Crispin, falls on 25 October and is the feast day of the Christian saints Crispin and Crispinian, twins who were martyred c. 286. They are both the patron saints of cobblers, leather workers, tanners, saddlers and glove, lace and shoemakers (among other professions).

In modern times, the feast day is best known with reference to the St Crispin's Day Speech in Shakespeare's play Henry V. A scene in the play recounts the Battle of Agincourt, which took place on Saint Crispin's Day in 1415, with the titular character giving a speech before the battle referencing the feast day.

When the Battle of Balaclava was fought on 25 October 1854, the coincidence was noticed by contemporaries, who used Shakespeare's words to comment on the battle. A similar effect occurred with reference to the Battle of Leyte Gulf, fought on St. Crispin's Day in 1944.

== Feast day ==
The feast day of Saints Crispin and Crispinian is 25 October. Although this feast was removed from the Roman Catholic Church's universal liturgical calendar following the Second Vatican Council, the two saints are still commemorated on that day in the most recent edition of the Roman Martyrology. The feast remains as a "Black Letter Saints' Day" in the calendar of the Anglican Book of Common Prayer (1662) and a "commemoration" in Common Worship (2000).

== Battle of Agincourt ==
The Battle of Agincourt was heavily dramatized by William Shakespeare in Henry V, featuring the battle in which Henry inspired his much-outnumbered English forces to fight the French through the St Crispin's Day Speech, saying that his badly-outnumbered soldiers should not wish that their numbers were reinforced by "those men in England who do no work to-day", as "the fewer men, the greater share of honour". The central part of the speech begins, "This day is called the feast of Crispian", and goes on to say that each soldier who survives the battle will, each year, "rouse him at the name of Crispian" and say, "'These wounds I had on Crispin's day'", and:

Crispin Crispian shall ne'er go by,
From this day to the ending of the world,
But we in it shall be rememberèd;
We few, we happy few, we band of brothers.
