= Brotherhood =

Brotherhood or The Brotherhood may refer to:

== Family, relationships, and organizations ==
- Fraternity (philosophy) or brotherhood, an ethical relationship between people, which is based on love and solidarity
- Fraternity or brotherhood, a male social organization
- Brother, a male sibling
- Brother (Christian), the title used for a monk in certain monastic orders
  - Lay brother, a monk primarily focused on secular work rather than prayer and worship
  - Orthodox brotherhood, also Bratstva, members of an urban Eastern Orthodox community in the Polish–Lithuanian Commonwealth
- Brotherhood (Order of the Arrow), a membership level in the Boy Scouts of America honor society
- The Brotherhood, a video game company whose publications include the 2015 horror adventure game Stasis

== Film ==
- The Brotherhood (1968 film), an American crime drama directed by Martin Ritt, starring Kirk Douglas
- The Brotherhood (2001 film), a homoerotic horror film by David Decoteau, the first in a series
- The Brotherhood (2017 film), a 2017 Indian documentary film
- The Brotherhood (film series), a series of homoerotic horror films
- Brotherhood, a 1986 film directed by Stephen Shin
- Brotherhood: Taegukgi, a 2004 South Korean film
- Brotherhood (2009 film) (Danish: Broderskab), a Danish drama
- Brotherhood (2010 film), an American thriller directed by Will Canon
- Brotherhood (2016 film), a British drama film and third and final installment to Noel Clarke's Kidulthood Trilogy
- Brotherhood (2018 film), a Canadian short film directed by Meryam Joobeur
- Brotherhood (2019 film), a Canadian drama film directed by Richard Bell
- Brotherhood (2022 film), a Nigerian film directed by Loukman Ali

== Music ==
- Brotherhood (3T album), 1995
- Brotherhood (B'z album), 1999
- Brotherhood (The Chemical Brothers album), 2008
- Brotherhood (The Doobie Brothers album), 1991
- Brotherhood (New Order album), 1986
- The Brotherhood (Lynch Mob album), 2017
- The Brotherhood (Running Wild album), 2002
- The Brotherhood (rap group), a 1990s British hip hop group

== Television ==
- Brotherhood (2002 TV series), a 2002 Singaporean-Chinese drama series
- Brotherhood (American TV series), a 2006–2008 American crime drama series
- Brotherhood (British TV series), a 2015 British sitcom
- Brotherhood (Brazilian TV series), a 2019 Brazilian crime drama web television series
- "Brotherhood" (Arrow), an episode of Arrow
- "Brotherhood" (Person of Interest), an episode of Person of Interest
- "The Brotherhood" (Stargate Atlantis), an episode of Stargate Atlantis
- Fullmetal Alchemist: Brotherhood, the second anime version of the manga Fullmetal Alchemist
- The Love School, a 1975 British series also known as The Brotherhood
- Brotherhood: Final Fantasy XV, an original net animation series supplementing Final Fantasy XV

== Fiction ==
- The Brotherhood (comics), a Marvel series featuring a version of the Brotherhood of Mutants
- The Brotherhood, an organization based on the Communist party in Ralph Ellison's novel Invisible Man
- The Brotherhood (Nineteen Eighty-Four), a fictitious organization in George Orwell's novel Nineteen-Eighty Four

== Video games ==
- Assassin's Creed: Brotherhood, a 2010 video game
- The Brotherhood, a fictional gang in the 2008 video game Saints Row 2

== Other uses ==
- The Brotherhood, a professional wrestling tag team composed of Cody and Dustin Rhodes
- Brotherhood (Ukrainian political party), a Ukrainian national Christian anarchist political party
- The Brotherhood, a 1984 expose of Freemasonry by Stephen Knight
- The Brotherhood, an alternative name for the Brodhull, an assembly for representatives of the Cinque Ports, a historic confederation of towns in England
- Brotherhood (sculpture), Czechoslovak sculpture dedicated to the end of the Prague Offensive during World War II
- The Brotherhood (Mutant Chronicles), a 1993 supplement for the role-playing game Mutant Chronicles

== See also ==
- Brother (disambiguation)
- Brothers (disambiguation)
- Ahva (disambiguation) (Hebrew: אחווה, lit. Brotherhood), for Israel-related articles
- Brödraskapet (English: The Brotherhood), a Swedish prison gang
- Sodality, a type of religious organization
- Band of Brothers (disambiguation)
- Brothers in Arms (disambiguation)
- Fraternity (disambiguation)
- Sisterhood (disambiguation)
- Mario & Luigi: Brothership, a 2024 video game
