= Gunsmoke season 17 =

Gunsmoke
- Season 17
- Starring: James Arness; Ken Curtis; Milburn Stone; Amanda Blake; Buck Taylor
- No. of episodes: 24

Release
- Original network: CBS
- Original release: September 13, 1971 – March 13, 1972

Season chronology
- ← Previous; Season 16 Next → Season 18

Gunsmoke is an American Western television series developed by Charles Marquis Warren and based on the radio program of the same name. The series ran for 20 seasons, making it the longest-running Western in television history.

The first episode of season 17 aired in the United States on September 13, 1971, and the final episode aired on March 13, 1972. All episodes were broadcast in the U.S. by CBS.

Season 17 of Gunsmoke was the sixth season of color episodes. Previous seasons were filmed in black-and-white.

== Synopsis ==
Gunsmoke is set in and around Dodge City, Kansas, in the post-Civil War era and centers on United States Marshal Matt Dillon (James Arness) as he enforces law and order in the city. In its original format, the series also focuses on Dillon's friendship with deputy Festus Haggen (Ken Curtis); Doctor Galen "Doc" Adams (Milburn Stone), the town's physician; Kitty Russell (Amanda Blake), saloon girl and later owner of the Long Branch Saloon; and deputy Newly O'Brien (Buck Taylor).

== Cast and characters ==
=== Main ===
- James Arness as Matt Dillon
- Milburn Stone as Doc
- Amanda Blake as Kitty
- Glenn Strange as Sam Noonan
- Ken Curtis as Festus
- Buck Taylor as Newly

== Production ==
Season 17 consisted of 24 one-hour color episodes produced by executive producer John Mantley along with producer Leonard Katzman an associate producer Ron Honthaner.

Episode 1, "The Lost", was the last episode directed by Robert Totten.

Episode 19, "One for the Road", was the third of three episodes that led to the spin-off series, Dirty Sally.

=== Casting ===
Pat Hingle was cast as the town doctor to replace Milburn Stone's character, Doc Adams. He appeared in six episodes, beginning with episode 5, "New Doctor in Town". Stone returned to the role of Doc Adams in episode 12, "The Bullet".

== Episodes ==
No. overall	No. in season	Title	Directed by	Written by	Original release date	Prod. code
540	1	"The Lost"	Robert Totten	Story by : Warren Vanders; Screenplay by : Jack Miller	September 13, 1971	0512
Kitty befriends a Wild Child (Laurie Prange) when she gets lost after a stagecoach accident, and together they try to survive until they can reach civilization.
541	2	"Phoenix"	Paul Stanley	Anthony Lawrence	September 20, 1971	0503
Bank robber Phoenix (Glenn Corbett), set to be released from Leavenworth after serving his time, must decide whether or not he will kill ex-lawman Jess Hume (Gene Evans) for the $2,000 in gold double eagles that his cell-mate John Sontag (Ramon Bieri) offers, and Hume's beautiful young wife Kate (Mariette Hartley) only adds more incentive.
542	3	"Waste"	Vincent McEveety	Jim Byrnes	September 27, 1971	0511
543	4	"Waste"	Vincent McEveety	Jim Byrnes	October 4, 1971	0511
Part 1: Matt's search for outlaw Ben Rodman (Jeremy Slate) is interrupted by a search for the boy Willie Hubbard's (Johnnie Whitaker) mother Sarah, which leads them to a group of saloon girls crossing the badlands in Maggie Blaisedell's (Ruth Roman) wagon. Part 2: Matt, the boy, Jed and the saloon girls get trapped in a deserted fort without any water, to play a waiting game with Ben Rodman's outlaws who will stop at nothing to get the gold Maggie is smuggling out to the prospectors who mined it.
544	5	"New Doctor in Town"	Philip Leacock	Jack Miller	October 11, 1971	0505
Dr. John Chapman (Pat Hingle) finds it hard to be accepted as he tries to fill in for Doc Adams, who felt the need to return to medical school after losing a patient.
545	6	"The Legend"	Philip Leacock	Calvin Clements, Jr.	October 18, 1971	0507
A young man, Travis Colter (Jan-Michael Vincent) starts to consider heading down the same path as his outlaw brothers, while his mother Beatrice Colter (Kim Hunter) tries to dissuade him.
546	7	"Trafton"	Bernard McEveety	Ron Bishop	October 25, 1971	0504
After shooting a priest who forgave him before dying, hardened outlaw Trafton (Victor French) finds compassion for his victims, which leads to his downfall.
547	8	"Lynott"	Gunnar Hellström	Ron Bishop	November 1, 1971	0509
Former lawman Tom Lynott (Richard Kiley) fills in for Matt after he is badly wounded, but Lynott's easygoing approach to the law puts Dodge City at the mercy of Talley (Anthony Caruso) and his cohorts.
548	9	"Lijah"	Irving J. Moore	William Blinn	November 8, 1971	0506
Mountain man Lijah (Denny Miller) is accused of massacring farmers.
549	10	"My Brother's Keeper"	Paul Stanley	Arthur Dales^{[C]}	November 15, 1971	0508
Festus tries to keep an old Sioux Indian (John Dierkes) alive, even though he wishes to die in peace.
550	11	"Drago"	Paul Stanley	Jim Byrnes	November 22, 1971	0510
Outlaw Hannon (Ben Johnson) murders Clara (Tani Phelps Guthrie) to steal her horse and severely injures her son Ruben (Mitchell Silberman), while their guest, a mountain-man/scout named Drago (Buddy Ebsen), is fishing. Matt deputizes Drago to join a posse under Newly, but Drago is out for vigilante vengeance and sets out ahead of the posse to hunt down and kill Hannon.
551	12	"The Bullet"	Bernard McEveety	Jim Byrnes	November 29, 1971	0514
552	13	"The Bullet"	Bernard McEveety	Jim Byrnes	December 6, 1971	0515
553	14	"The Bullet"	Bernard McEveety	Jim Byrnes	December 13, 1971	0516
Part 1: Doc Adams returns to dodge just as Matt is backshot by skinner Amos Potter (Norman Alden), but he is unable or unwilling to try to remove the bullet himself, as it is dangerously close to Matt's spine. Doc, Kitty, Festus and Newly load Matt onto a train bound for Denver where there is a surgeon that Doc trusts to remove the bullet. However, Jack Sinclair (Eric Braeden) and his gang complicate matters by stopping the train to rob an army gold shipment. Part 2: Sinclair's gang delay Doc's and Matt's journey to Denver while they offload the army gold from the train to a wagon. Beth Tilton (Katherine Justice) plots to free herself from Pinkerton detective Caldwell's (Walter Sande) custody. Part 3: Festus and Newly try to delay Sinclair from leaving with the gold to give the Conductor (Warren Kemmerling) time to get the train moving towards Denver again. While Matt is unconscious, Kitty reveals her feelings towards Matt, summing up with "...after 17 years...it's the longest non-permanent relationship in history." Meanwhile, Father Sanchez (Alejandro Rey) encourages Doc to perform an emergency surgery on Matt to save the marshal's life
554	15	"P.S. Murry Christmas"	Herb Wallerstein	William Kelley	December 27, 1971	0513
Drifter Titus Spangler (Jack Elam) and seven orphans find a way to melt the cold heart of the orphanage headmistress Emma Grundy (Jeanette Nolan) at Christmastime.
555	16	"No Tomorrow"	Irving J. Moore	Richard Fielder	January 3, 1972	0517
Homesteader Ben Justin (Sam Groom) is falsely accused and convicted of stealing horses, and then further accused of murder after breaking out of jail to be with his wife Elizabeth (Pamela McMyler) and newborn son.
556	17	"Hidalgo"	Paul Stanley	Colley Cibber	January 10, 1972	0501
Outlaws led by Mando (Alfonso Arau) shoot Matt and leave him to die in the desert of Chihuahua where he is found by a Mexican boy, Lucho (Fabian Gregory), the son of Agustin Hildago (Thomas Gomez), who helps Matt recover. Hildago's help puts his family, including his daughter Lucero (Linda Marsh), in danger of retaliation from Mando.
557	18	"Tara"	Bernard McEveety	William Kelley	January 17, 1972	0522
The charming widow Tara Hutson (Michele Carey) plays Newly against gunman Gecko Ridley (L. Q. Jones) who is after $5,000 her husband stole before going to prison.
558	19	"One for the Road"	Bernard McEveety	Jack Miller	January 24, 1972	0520
A drunk, Lucius Prince (Jack Albertson), escapes from his reproving daughter, Miss Elsie (Melissa Murphy), who wants to put her father in an institution. However, her fiancé Tom Rickaby (Victor Holchak) wants a quick and final solution. Sally Fergus (Jeanette Nolan) helps Lucius face up to the problem.
559	20	"The Predators"	Bernard McEveety	Calvin Clements, Sr.	January 31, 1972	0518
A "mad" dog is killing cattle and sheep, while vengeful gunman Howard Kane (Claude Akins) sets out to kill Cole Matson (George Murdock), the man who shot him in the back four years ago. Abelia (Jacqueline Scott) tries to dissuade Kane, while her children Jonathan (Brian Morrison) and Marieanne (Jodie Foster) try to tame the dog.
560	21	"Yankton"	Vincent McEveety	Jim Byrnes	February 7, 1972	0521
Saddle tramp Yankton (James Stacy) uses rancher Will Donavan's (Forrest Tucker) money to court his daughter, Emma (Pamela Payton-Wright), but her mother Henrietta (Nancy Olson) wants to take her to Europe instead.
561	22	"Blind Man's Buff"	Herb Wallerstein	Ron Honthaner	February 21, 1972	0519
Two bushwhackers, Charlie Clavin (George Lindsey) and Hank McCall (Charles Kuenstle), shoot and rob a man, causing him to lose his memory. The lonely widow Phoebe Preston (Anne Jackson) finds and takes care of the wounded amnesiac, calling him Jed Frazer (Victor French), her newlywed husband.
562	23	"Alias Festus Haggin"	Vincent McEveety	Calvin Clements, Sr.	March 6, 1972	0523
A case of mistaken identity ensues when Festus is identified by a special agent for the governor, Doyle (Ramon Bieri), and by Rand (Booth Colman), as being Frank Eaton who is wanted for three murders, among other charges.
563	24	"The Wedding"	Bernard McEveety	Harry Kronman	March 13, 1972	0502
Donna Clayton (Melissa Newman) and Cory Soames (Sam Elliott) are determined to get married despite the objections of her father, Walt Clayton (Morgan Woodward).

== Release ==
=== Broadcast ===
Due to the institution of the Prime Time Access Rule earlier in 1971, Gunsmoke moved back one half hour to 8:00-9:00 pm (EST) Mondays on CBS.

=== Home media ===
The seventeenth season was released on DVD by Paramount Home Entertainment on December 10, 2019.

== Reception ==
Gunsmoke season 17 reached #4 in the Nielsen ratings.
