= St Crispin's Day Speech =

Speech from the Shakespeare play Henry V

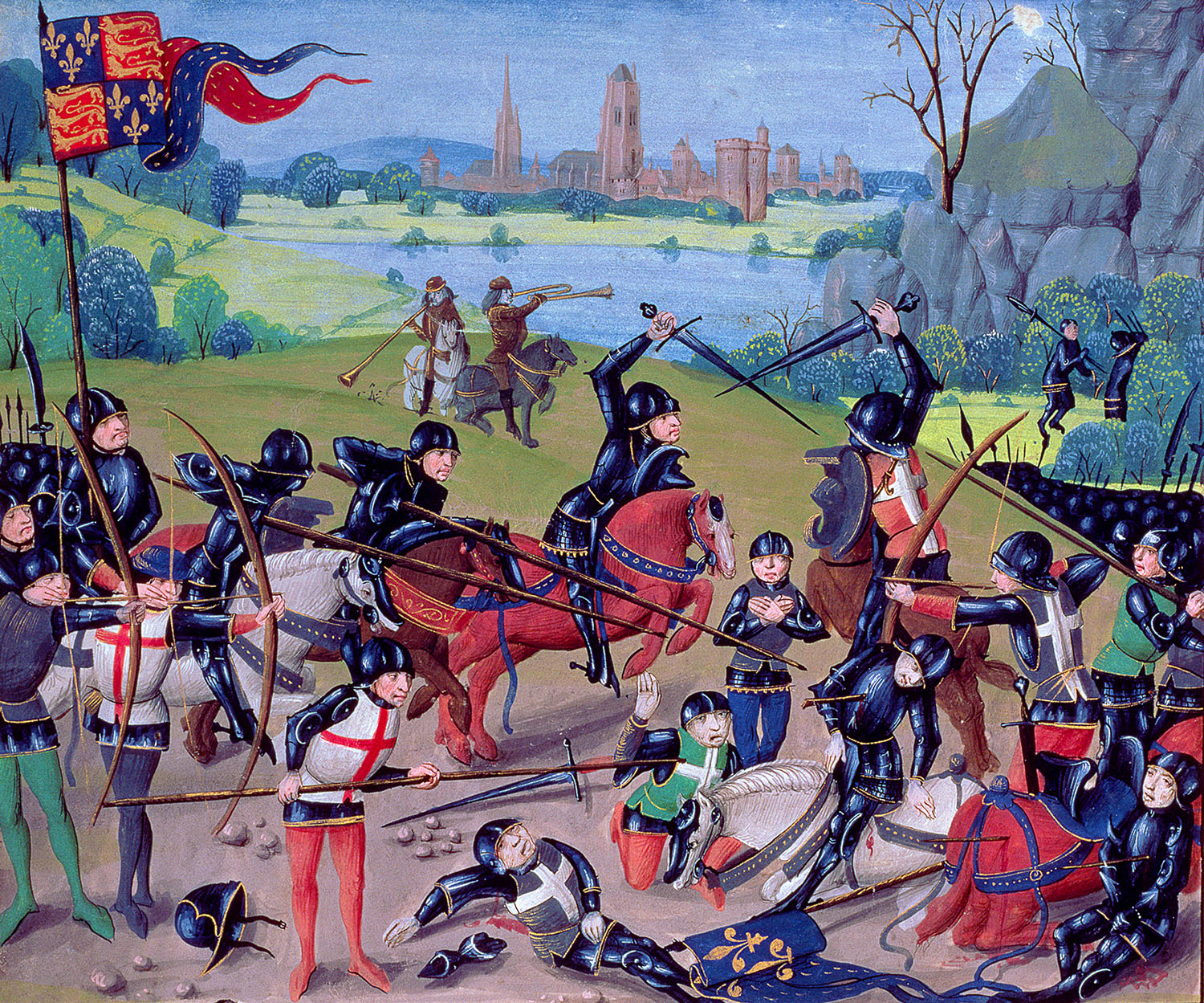
The Battle of Agincourt as depicted in the 15th century 'St Albans Chronicle' by Thomas Walsingham

The St Crispin's Day speech is a part of William Shakespeare's history play Henry V, Act IV Scene iii(3) 18–67. On the eve of the Battle of Agincourt, which fell on Saint Crispin's Day, Henry V urges his men, who were vastly outnumbered by the French, to imagine the glory and immortality that will be theirs if they are victorious. The speech has been famously portrayed by Laurence Olivier in the 1944 film to raise British spirits during the Second World War, and by Kenneth Branagh in the 1989 film Henry V; it made famous the phrase "band of brothers". The play was written around 1600, and several later writers have used parts of it in their own texts.

== The speech ==
Westmoreland:
O that we now had here
But one ten thousand of those men in England
That do no work to-day!

King:
What's he that wishes so?
My cousin, Westmoreland? No, my fair cousin;
If we are mark'd to die, we are enough
To do our country loss; and if to live,
The fewer men, the greater share of honour.
God's will! I pray thee, wish not one man more.
By Jove, I am not covetous for gold,
Nor care I who doth feed upon my cost;
It yearns me not if men my garments wear;
Such outward things dwell not in my desires.
But if it be a sin to covet honour,
I am the most offending soul alive.
No, faith, my coz, wish not a man from England.
God's peace! I would not lose so great an honour
As one man more methinks would share from me
For the best hope I have. O, do not wish one more!
Rather proclaim it, Westmoreland, through my host,
That he which hath no stomach to this fight,
Let him depart; his passport shall be made,
And crowns for convoy put into his purse;
We would not die in that man's company
That fears his fellowship to die with us.
This day is call'd the feast of Crispian.
He that outlives this day, and comes safe home,
Will stand a tip-toe when this day is nam'd,
And rouse him at the name of Crispian.
He that shall live this day, and see old age,
Will yearly on the vigil feast his neighbours,
And say "To-morrow is Saint Crispian."
Then will he strip his sleeve and show his scars,
And say "These wounds I had on Crispin's day."
Old men forget; yet all shall be forgot,
But he'll remember, with advantages,
What feats he did that day. Then shall our names,
Familiar in his mouth as household words—
Harry the King, Bedford and Exeter,
Warwick and Talbot, Salisbury and Gloucester—
Be in their flowing cups freshly rememb'red.
This story shall the good man teach his son;
And Crispin Crispian shall ne'er go by,
From this day to the ending of the world,
But we in it shall be rememberèd—
We few, we happy few, we band of brothers;
For he to-day that sheds his blood with me
Shall be my brother; be he ne'er so vile,
This day shall gentle his condition;
And gentlemen in England now a-bed
Shall think themselves accurs'd they were not here,
And hold their manhoods cheap whiles any speaks
That fought with us upon Saint Crispin's day.

== Cultural influence ==
=== Comparisons with other speeches ===
- It has been compared to the Baljuna Covenant, a similar oath of mutual loyalty Genghis Khan made centuries earlier.

=== Use and quotation ===
- In his final general order to his troops, issued on 18 October 1783, George Washington wrote that no one "could imagine that the most violent local prejudices would cease so soon, and that men who came from the different parts of the continent ... would instantly become one patriotic band of brothers."
- During the Napoleonic Wars, just before the Battle of the Nile, Horatio Nelson, 1st Viscount Nelson, then Rear Admiral of the Blue, referred to his captains as his "band of brothers".
- Charles Dickens' magazine Household Words (1850–1851) took its name from the speech.
- During the First Barbary War, Lieutenant Stephen Decatur, Jr. proclaimed "the fewer men, the greater share of honor" before leading a raiding party to destroy the USS Philadelphia.
- During World War II, Laurence Olivier delivered the speech during a radio programme to boost British morale and Winston Churchill found him so inspiring that he asked Olivier to produce the Shakespeare play as a film. Olivier's adaptation appeared in 1944.
- The title of British politician Duff Cooper's autobiography Old Men Forget (1953) is taken from the speech.
- According to Mark Bowden's book, Black Hawk Down, chronicling the 1993 Battle of Mogadishu, general William F. Garrison quoted the speech during a memorial service for the men killed in the battle.
- During the legal battle for the U.S. presidential election of 2000, regarding the Florida vote recount, members of the Florida legal team for George W. Bush, the eventual legal victor, joined arms and recited the speech during a break in preparation, to motivate themselves.
- On the day of the result of the 2016 United Kingdom European Union membership referendum, as the vote to leave became clear, activist and MEP Daniel Hannan is reported to have delivered an edited version of the speech from a table, replacing the names Bedford, Exeter, Warwick and Talbot with other prominent Vote Leave activists.
- On March 19, 2023, before the kickoff of the Derby della Capitale between SS Lazio and AS Roma, the ultras of SS Lazio unfurled tifos quoting excerpts from Shakespeare's St. Crispin Day's Speech, as a symbolic gesture of leading the team to the "war" against their arch-rivals.
- On January 13, 2024, American football coach Jim Harbaugh recited most of the speech at a rally to celebrate the 2023 Michigan Wolverines football team's national championship. He replaced the names Harry the King, Bedford, Exeter, Warwick, Talbot, Salisbury, and Gloucester with those of key players during Michigan's championship season: J. J. McCarthy, Blake Corum, Mike Sainristil, Trevor Keegan, Zak Zinter, Kris Jenkins, and Michael Barrett.

=== Film, television, music and literature ===
Parts and/or versions of the speech appear in films such as The Man Who Shot Liberty Valance (1962), Tombstone (1993), Renaissance Man (1994), Tea With Mussolini (1999), Mystery Men (1999), To End All Wars (2001), This Is England (2006), Their Finest (2017) and Togo (2019). It has also been used in television series such as Rough Riders (1997), Buffy the Vampire Slayer, The Black Adder, and Doctor Who.

- The phrase "band of brothers" appears in the 1789 song "Hail, Columbia", written for the inauguration of George Washington as the first President of the United States.
- During the American Civil War, "The Bonnie Blue Flag"—a 1861 Confederate marching song written by Harry McCarthy—began with the words "We are a band of brothers, and native to the soil".
- Stephen Ambrose borrowed the phrase "Band of Brothers" for the title of his 1992 book on E Company of the 101st Airborne during World War II; it was later adapted into the 2001 miniseries Band of Brothers. In the closing scene of the series, Carwood Lipton quotes from Shakespeare's speech.
- The 2016 videogame We Happy Few takes its name from the speech.
- A part of the speech is quoted in the 2017 novel The Ministry of Utmost Happiness by Arundhati Roy as one of the character's mother's favourite passage from Shakespeare which is recited (silently) at her second funeral.
