= Gunsmoke season 18 =

Gunsmoke
- Season 18
- Starring: James Arness; Ken Curtis; Milburn Stone; Amanda Blake; Buck Taylor
- No. of episodes: 24

Release
- Original network: CBS
- Original release: September 11, 1972 – March 5, 1973

Season chronology
- ← Previous; Season 17 Next → Season 19

Gunsmoke is an American Western television series developed by Charles Marquis Warren and based on the radio program of the same name. The series ran for 20 seasons, making it the longest-running Western in television history.

The first episode of season 18 aired in the United States on September 11, 1972, and the final episode aired on March 5, 1973. All episodes were broadcast in the U.S. by CBS.

Season 18 of Gunsmoke was the seventh season of color episodes. Previous seasons were filmed in black-and-white.

== Synopsis ==
Gunsmoke is set in and around Dodge City, Kansas, in the post-Civil War era and centers on United States Marshal Matt Dillon (James Arness) as he enforces law and order in the city. In its original format, the series also focuses on Dillon's friendship with deputy Festus Haggen (Ken Curtis); Doctor Galen "Doc" Adams (Milburn Stone), the town's physician; Kitty Russell (Amanda Blake), saloon girl and later owner of the Long Branch Saloon; and deputy Newly O'Brien (Buck Taylor).

== Cast and characters ==
=== Main ===
- James Arness as Matt Dillon
- Milburn Stone as Doc
- Amanda Blake as Kitty
- Glenn Strange as Sam Noonan
- Ken Curtis as Festus
- Buck Taylor as Newly

== Production ==
Season 18 consisted of 24 one-hour color episodes produced by executive producer John Mantley along with producer Leonard Katzman an associate producer Ron Honthaner.

Occasionally, titles were reused from previous seasons. This season included three such episodes: episode 12, "The Brothers (formerly 'Incident at Sayville Junction')", which was also a title used in season 11; episode 16, "Homecoming", which was also a title used in season 9, episode 34; and episode 22, "Jesse", which was a title used in season 3, episode 6.

== Episodes ==
No. overall	No. in season	Title	Directed by	Written by	Original release date	Prod. code
564	1	"The River"	Herb Wallerstein	Jack Miller	September 11, 1972	0560
565	2	"The River"	Herb Wallerstein	Jack Miller	September 18, 1972	0560
Part 1: Bank robbers led by Charlie Utter (Slim Pickens) chase Matt down Oregon's Rogue River to retrieve $24,000 that they robbed. Matt jumps into the river and is dragged on to a raft by orphans Hannah Kincaid (Patti Cohoon) and Tuttle Kincaid (Clay O'Brien) who are runaways from a workhouse. Together they head downstream. Part 2: Matt and the runaways acquire two more passengers, Pierre Audubon and Paulette Duvalier, and must make it passed the rapids, and foil an ambush set up at "The Narrows" by Charlie Utter's gang, further on down Oregon's Rogue River, in order to reach the town of Piety.
566	3	"Bohannan"	Alf Kjellin	William Kelley	September 25, 1972	0555
Faith healer Bohannan (Richard Kiley) is asked by Lydia Walden (Linda Marsh) to cure her terminally ill son, Heck Walden (Vincent Van Patten).
567	4	"The Judgement"	Philip Leacock	Shimon Wincelberg	October 2, 1972	0553
Gunman Musgrove (Ramon Bieri) plots revenge against Ira Spratt (William Windom) who turned him in as an Army deserter. When Ira escapes, Musgrove takes Gideon (Tim O'Connor) hostage and gives the town and Gideon's friends an ultimatum, threatening to kill Gideon if they do not hunt down and deliver Ira by eight o'clock.
568	5	"The Drummer"	Bernard McEveety	Richard Fielder	October 9, 1972	0554
Salesman Daniel Shay (Victor French) is forced to face his past and his victims, Sara Morgan (Fionnuala Flanagan) and Jimmy Morgan (Brandon Cruz), when Enoch Brandt (Bruce Glover) exposes him as the "Butcher of Rockcreek"
569	6	"Sarah"	Gunnar Hellström	Calvin Clements, Sr.	October 16, 1972	0558
Sara (Anne Francis), an old flame of Matt's gets him involved with stage robbers led by outlaw Pappy Quinn (Anthony Caruso).
570	7	"The Fugitives"	Irving J. Moore	Charles Joseph Stone	October 23, 1972	0551
Doc is kidnapped by fugitives from justice, led by outlaw Bede Stalcup (James Olson), and forced to save the life of Bede's brother, Danny Stalcup (Darrell Larson).
571	8	"Eleven Dollars"	Irving J. Moore	Paul Savage	October 30, 1972	0559
Festus sets out to settle an $11 estate for Charity Spencer (Diane Shalet), but it becomes more of a chore after he meets Sarah Elkins (Susan Oliver) and her two boys, Chad (Josh Albee) and Clay (Ike Eisenmann).
572	9	"Milligan"	Bernard McEveety	Ron Bishop	November 6, 1972	0552
Farmer John Milligan (Harry Morgan) joins a posse to track down bank robbers led by Jack Norcross (Joseph Campanella). When Norcross is shot in the back, the Milligan family are made pariahs, and John and his daughter Wendy Milligan (Patti Cohoon) are terrorized.
573	10	"Tatum"	Gunnar Hellström	Jim Byrnes	November 13, 1972	0556
Dying gunman Bodie Tatum (Gene Evans) endures a long, sad journey with his Cheyanne wife Kata (Ana Korita), and his estranged daughters, Maddy (Sandra Smith), Marion (Sheila Larken) and Gwenn (Jay MacIntosh), to be buried next to his wife in a town that doesn't want him there.
574	11	"The Sodbusters"	Robert Butler	Ron Bishop	November 20, 1972	0557
Sodbuster Clarabelle (Katherine Justice) fights cattle baron Lamoor Underwood (Morgan Woodward) for her water supply, with the help of gunfighter Pete Brown (Alex Cord).
575	12	"The Brothers"	Gunnar Hellström	Calvin Clements, Sr.	November 27, 1972	0564
Ruthless outlaw Cord Wrecken (Steve Forrest) seeks revenge on Kitty for shooting his brother, Jay Wrecken (Angus Duncan).
576	13	"Hostage!"	Gunnar Hellström	Paul F. Edwards	December 11, 1972	0566
After Matt captures Vigil Connor (Marco St. John), one of the Dog Soldiers led by Jude Connor (William Smith), the rest of the gang shoot Festus and take Kitty hostage hoping to trade before Virgil is hanged. After a stay of execution is denied by the governor, Jude shoots Kitty for revenge.
577	14	"Jubilee"	Herb Wallerstein	Story by : Jack Freeman; Screenplay by : Paul Savage	December 18, 1972	0565
Against the wishes of his wife, Bess Frye (Collin Wilcox-Horne), a poor farmer, Tuck Frye (Tom Skerritt) risks his farm and all his money to race his prized quarter horse, Jubilee.
578	15	"Arizona Midnight"	Irving J. Moore	Dudley Bromley	January 1, 1973	0563
A midget, Arizona (Billy Curtis), rides into Dodge on a giant horse claiming he is a were-elephant who will turn into an elephant at midnight.
579	16	"Homecoming"	Gunnar Hellström	Calvin Clements, Sr.	January 8, 1973	0568
Cattle Rustler Rick Wilson (Richard Kelton) and younger brother Raymond (Robert Pratt) return to Dodge and, finding that their mother Anna (Lurene Tuttle) is dying, want to stay until the end. But their partner, gunman John Mophet (Stuart Margolin), facing the hangman's noose if he is found, is anxious to leave for Laredo. He takes Doc and Anna's neighbor Mrs. Bronson (Claudia Bryar) as hostages.
580	17	"Shadler"	Arnold Laven	Jim Byrnes	January 15, 1973	0567
Former choir boy turned outlaw, Boone Shadler (Earl Holliman), condemned to hang, escapes prison and poses as a priest to retrieve $7,000 from a town that is now stricken with a plague, forcing him to keep up his disguise by helping those who are dying.
581	18	"Patricia"	Alf Kjellin	Calvin Clements, Sr.	January 22, 1973	0569
Newly meets Patricia Colby (Jess Walton), governess to Johnny (Ike Eisenmann) on the stage to Dodge, just as a Kansas twister approaches a stage relay station. Johnny is injured, and when they get to Dodge, Doc Adams asks Newly to assist all of the injured coming in from surrounding areas; Patricia also volunteers her nursing skills. After the crisis, the two court and get engaged, but Patricia is diagnosed with terminal leukemia.
582	19	"A Quiet Day in Dodge"	Alf Kjellin	Jack Miller	January 29, 1973	0571
Matt has a trying day. After 36 hours without sleep hunting down vicious prisoner Job Snelling (Leo Gordon), he must go a few hours more without rest while dealing with a brawl at the Long Branch between Dobie Crimps (Shug Fisher) and Buck Doolin (Douglas V. Fowley) who are feuding over a mail-order bride, and with nine-year-old juvenile delinquent, arsonist, horse thief and pie thrower Andy (Willie Ames), and with Kitty giving him the silent treatment after Matt fails to keep his promise for a picnic date.
583	20	"Whelan's Men"	Paul F. Edwards	Ron Bishop	February 5, 1973	0562
A gang of outlaws led by former lawman Dan Whelan (Robert Burr), who is out for revenge against Matt, take over Dodge while Matt is away, but a poker game with Kitty proves to be their undoing.
584	21	"Kimbro"	Gunnar Hellström	Jim Byrnes	February 12, 1973	0570
Adam Kimbro (John Anderson), Matt's mentor in law enforcement, is now on the skids. Matt asks Kimbro to put the badge back on to help guard a gold shipment, but Peak Stratton (Michael Strong) and his boys mean to take it from them.
585	22	"Jesse"	Bernard McEveety	Jim Byrnes	February 19, 1973	0572
Festus runs into his friend Jesse Dillard (Brock Peters) who has escaped from prison and is being tracked by Marshal Halstead (Regis J. Cordic). Now Festus and Newly must decide whether they'll allow trail boss Dave Carpenter (Jim Davis) to take Jesse back as their cook or take him back to jail to finish his 10-year sentence.
586	23	"Talbot"	Vincent McEveety	Jim Byrnes	February 26, 1973	0574
The outlaw Talbot (Anthony Zerbe) plans to rob the bank in Dodge, but is sidetracked by his attraction to Katherine (Salome Jens) after he is forced to kill her husband Eli (Robert Totten).
587	24	"This Golden Land"	Gunnar Hellström	Hal Sitowitz	March 5, 1973	0573
A Jewish family's faith is tested by the senseless death of Semel (Scott Selles). Their patriarch Moshe Gorofsky (Paul Stevens) must decide whether to tell Matt what Ruxton (Victor French) did, even while Moshe's son Gearshon (Richard Dreyfuss) is pressuring for justice.

== Release ==
=== Broadcast ===
Season eighteen aired Mondays at 8:00-9:00 pm (EST) on CBS.

=== Home media ===
The eighteenth season was released on DVD by Paramount Home Entertainment on February 4, 2020.

== Reception ==
Gunsmoke season 18 reached #8 in the Nielsen ratings.
