= Brother =

Male sibling

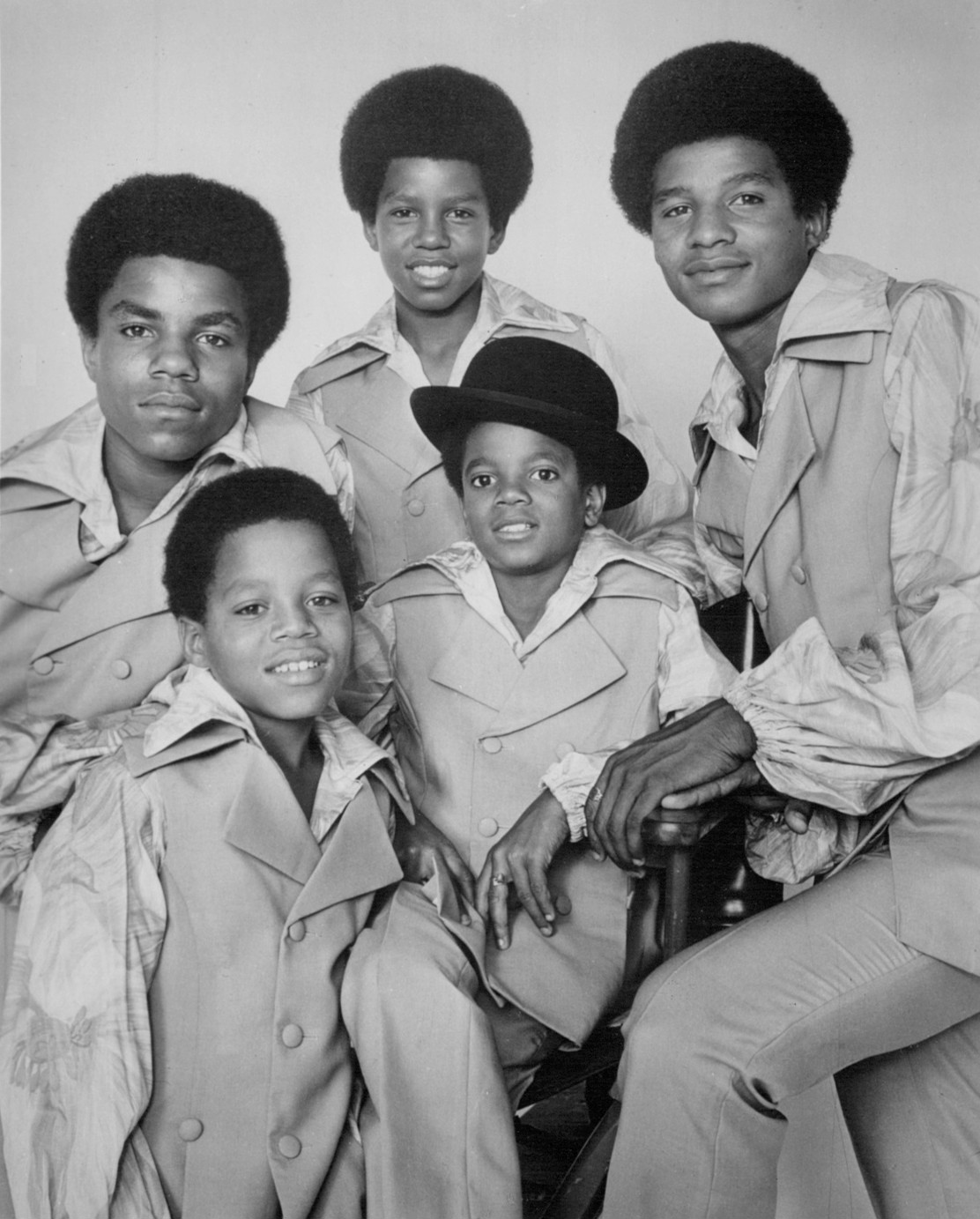
American band Jackson 5: Tito, Marlon, Michael, Jackie and Jermaine Jackson

A brother (pl.: brothers or brethren) is a man or boy who shares one or more parents with another; a male sibling. The female counterpart is a sister. Although the term typically refers to a familial relationship, it is sometimes used endearingly to refer to non-familial relationships. A full brother is a first degree relative.

== Overview ==
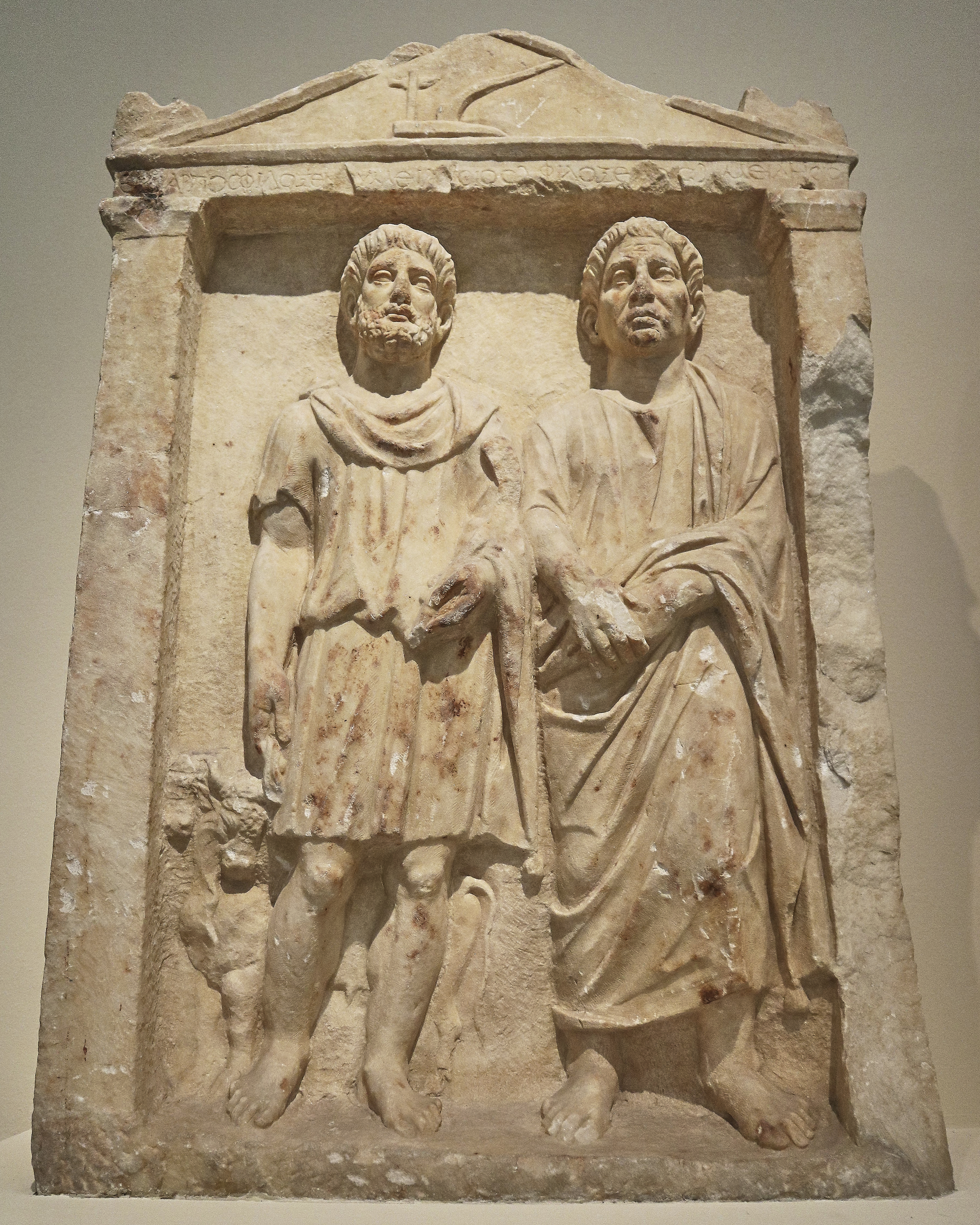
Grave stele of brothers Eukarpos and Philoxenos of Miletus 2nd c. AD

The term brother comes from the Proto-Indo-European *bʰréh₂tēr, which becomes Latin frater, of the same meaning. Sibling warmth or affection between male siblings has been correlated to some more negative effects. In pairs of brothers, higher sibling warmth is related to more risk taking behaviour, although risk taking behaviour is not related to sibling warmth in any other type of sibling pair. The cause of this phenomenon in which sibling warmth is only correlated with risk taking behaviours in brother pairs still is unclear. This finding does, however, suggest that although sibling conflict is a risk factor for risk taking behaviour, sibling warmth does not serve as a protective factor. Some studies suggest that girls having an older brother delays the onset of menarche by roughly one year. Research also suggests that the likelihood of being gay increases with the more older brothers a man has. Some analyzers have suggested that a man's attractiveness to a heterosexual woman may increase with the more he resembles her brother, while his unattractiveness may increase the more his likeness diverges from her brother. Females with a twin or very close-in-age brother, sometimes view him as their male alter ego, or what they would have been like, if they had a Y chromosomes.

== Fraternal relationship ==
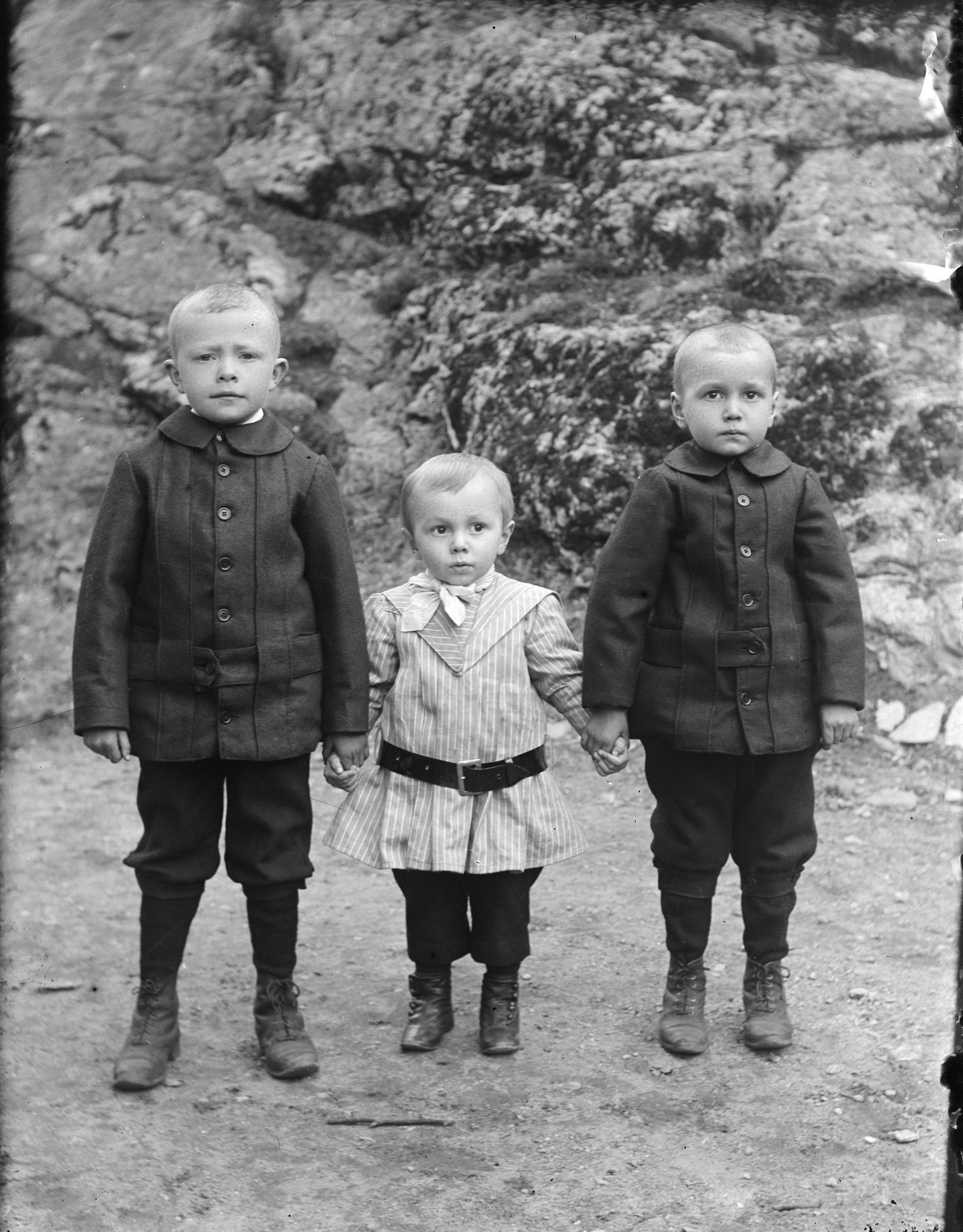
Three brothers

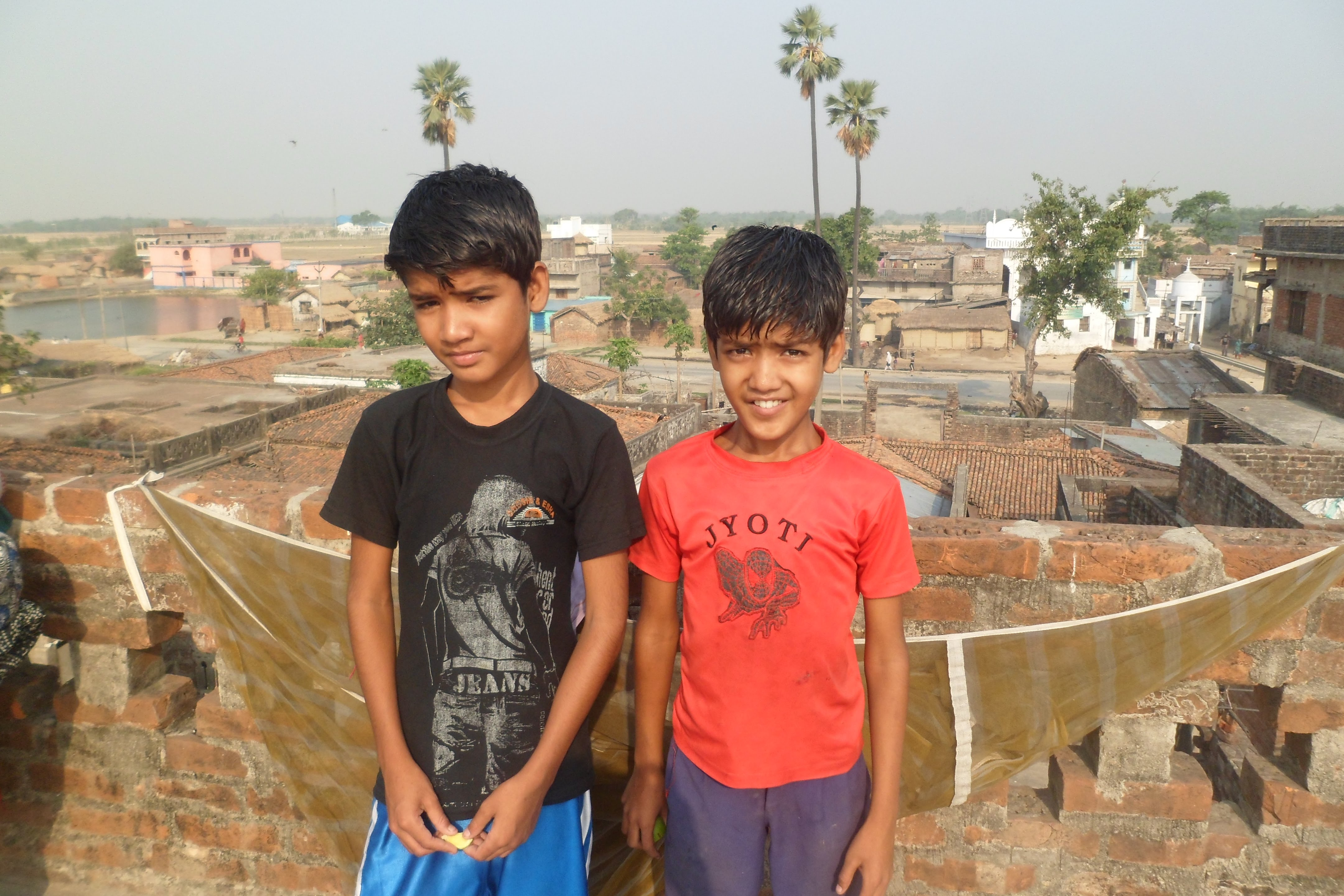
Two brothers in Bihar, India

The book Nicomachean Ethics, Book VIII, written by Aristotle in 350 BCE, offers a way in which people should view the relationships between biological brothers. The relationship of brothers is laid out with the following quote:

The friendship of brothers has the characteristics found in that of comrades and in general between people who are like each other, is as much as they belong more to each other and start with a love for each other from their very birth, and in as much as those born to the same parents and brought up together and similarly educated are more akin in character; and the test of time has been applied most fully and convincingly in their case.

For these reasons, it is the job of the older brother to influence the ethics of the younger brother by being a person of good action. Aristotle says "by imitating and reenacting the acts of good people, a child becomes habituated to good action". Over time the younger brother will develop the good actions of the older brother as well and be like him. Aristotle also adds this on the matter of retaining the action of doing good once imitated: "Once the habits of ethics or immorality become entrenched, they are difficult to break." The good habits that are created by the influence of the older brother become habit in the life of the younger brother and turn out to be seemingly permanent. It is the role of the older brother to be a positive influence on the development of the younger brother's upbringing when it comes to the education of ethics and good actions. When positive characteristics are properly displayed to the younger brother by the older brother, these habits and characteristics are imitated and foster an influential understanding of good ethics and positive actions.

== See also ==
- Brotherhood (disambiguation)
- Religious brother
- Sister
- Stepsibling
