= Sisterhood F.C. =

Sisterhood Football Club is a football club based in London, England.

== History ==
Sisterhood FC was founded in 2018.
