= The Sisterhood: Becoming Nuns =

- Genre: Reality
- Written by: Eric Evangelista; Shannon Evangelista
- Starring: Francesca DiPaola; Eseni Ellington; Clair Halbur; Stacey Jackson; Christie Young
- Country of origin: United States
- Original language: English
- No. of seasons: 1
- No. of episodes: 6

Production
- Executive producers: Mary Donahue; Eric Evangelista; Shannon Evangelista; Colleen Conway Grogan; Eli Lehrer
- Running time: 40 minutes
- Production company: Hot Snakes Media

Original release
- Network: Lifetime
- Release: 25 November – 16 December 2014

The Sisterhood: Becoming Nuns is an American reality television series that debuted on Lifetime on 25 November 2014. Written by Eric Evangelista and Shannon Evangelista, the show follows five young women as they visit communities of nuns and religious sisters and discern their religious vocations.

== Synopsis ==
The Sisterhood: Becoming Nuns follows five young women in their 20s as they visit different communities of women religious– both nuns and religious sisters. Nuns are cloistered and contemplative, meaning they have little contact with the outside world and spend much of their time in prayer. Religious sisters, on the other hand, are active, meaning they work in ministry outside the convent in addition to prayer.

The five young women visit three communities of sisters over the span of the series. The first community was that of the Carmelite Sisters for the Aged and Infirm in Germantown, New York. The second convent visited was home to the Daughters of St. Mary of Providence in Chicago, Illinois. The third and final community visited were the Sisters of St. Joseph the Worker in Walton, Kentucky.

At these communities, the women work in a variety of different ministries, as well as interacting with the sisters and experiencing community life in the convents. The women also have to deal with homesickness, the leaving behind of most of their possessions, as well as quarrels amongst themselves.

== Production ==
The Sisterhood: Becoming Nuns was written and executive produced by Eric Evangelista and Shannon Evangelista.

Filming was done on site at the convents in Germantown, New York, Chicago, Illinois, and Walton, Kentucky.

== Cast ==
- Francesca DiPaola, a 21-year-old recent college graduate
- Eseni Ellington, a 23-year-old former aspiring model
- Claire Halbur, a 26-year-old parish music minister
- Stacey Jackson, a 26-year-old musical theatre performer
- Christie Young, a 27-year-old country music band member

== Episodes ==
No.	Title	Original release date
1	"I'm Not Ready!"	November 25, 2014
Five young women in their 20s begin a six-week journey to discern whether to become Catholic nuns. They first visit the convent of the Carmelite Sisters for the Aged and Infirm in Germantown, New York.
2	"We're All Broken"	December 2, 2014
Eseni is conflicted between her discernment and her boyfriend back home, but is comforted by Sister Maria Therese's story of past love. Francesca is overcome with memories of her grandmother while volunteering at the Carmelite Sisters' nursing home. Stacey is touched while visiting a dying woman at the home. Christie is no longer having visions of Jesus, and Claire confides in Sister Cyril about Eseni's twerking.
3	"Navy Seals for Christ"	December 9, 2014
The women leave the Carmelite Sisters and move on to the convent of the Daughters of St. Mary of Providence in Chicago, Illinois where Claire and Christie thrive. Francesca and Stacey deal with issues that have haunted them before, and Eseni reconsiders her discernment when her boyfriend visits.
4	"The Road Not Taken"	December 9, 2014
Eseni considers leaving after an unexpected visit from her boyfriend, Darnell. She decides to stay after talking to Francesca, angering Darnell. Christie reveals to Stacey that she has made a decision, while Claire is optimistic about the next convent in rural Kentucky.
5	"Too Pretty to be Nuns"	December 16, 2014
The women arrive at the final convent in Walton, Kentucky, home to the Sisters of St. Joseph the Worker. Discord is created when Stacey and Christie accuse Eseni and Francesca of lying. Meanwhile, Claire has an important question to ask the mother superior.
6	"Revelation"	December 16, 2014
The women end their six-week discernment and return home to their families to reveal their decisions about whether or not to become nuns.

== Reception ==
Negative critics included Jo Piazza, who wrote in The Huffington Post that The Sisterhood will "turn nuns into Kardashians," and "is only going to serve to drag their vocation through the mud." The National Catholic Reporter criticized the series' inaccuracy about religious life, calling it a "glorified speed-dating version of a 'Come and See.'"

In addition, the show came to the attention of many nuns and religious sisters themselves. The International Business Times wrote, "For the most part, the show's first episode was met with positive reviews, although some nuns were hesitant about how the show will unfold."

Nancy deWolf Smith of The Wall Street Journal called the series "entertaining but illuminating". Hank Stuever of The Washington Post called the series is "an illuminating exploration of convent life," writing that the show "conducts itself with reverence and curiosity."
