= Sister =

Female sibling

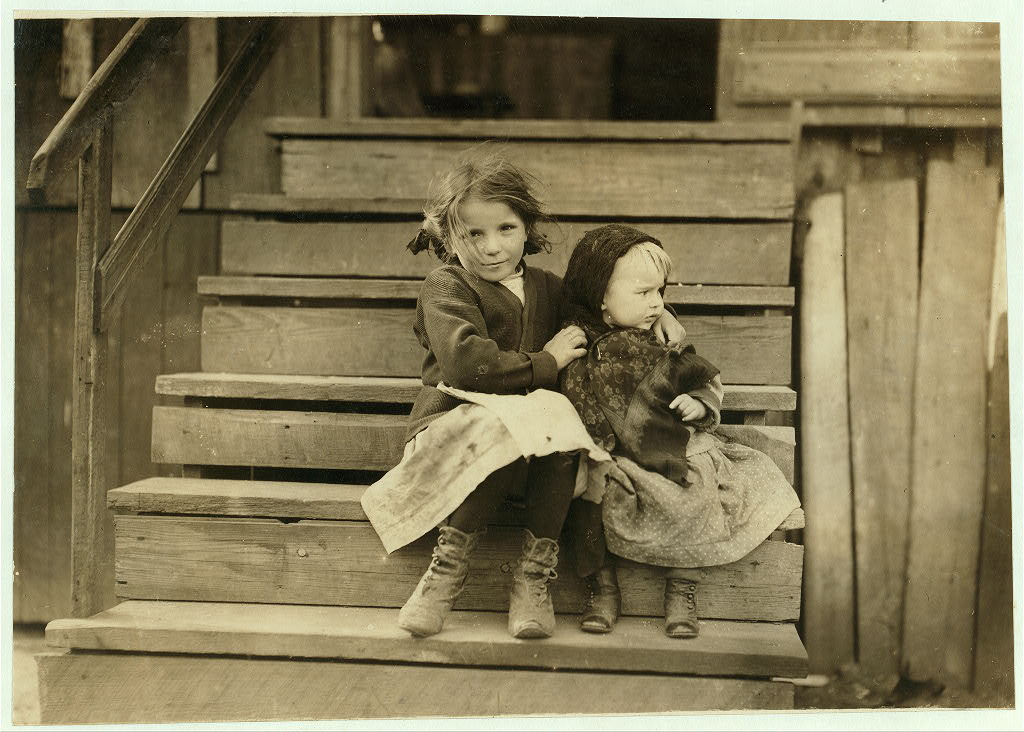
Two child sisters, the elder tending to the younger c. 1911.

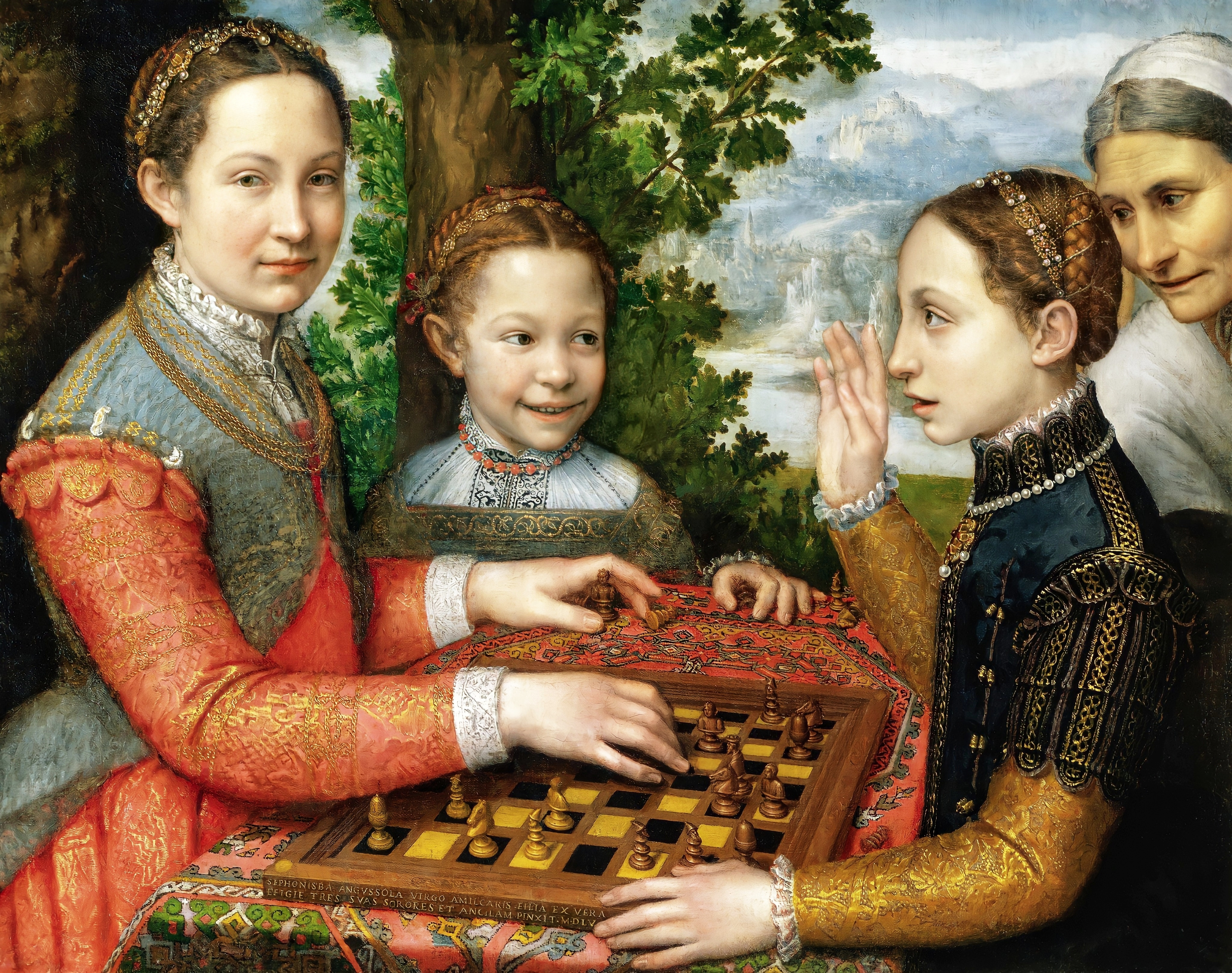
The Game of Chess (1555) by Sofonisba Anguissola (It depicts her sisters Lucia (left), Minerva (right) and Europa (middle) Anguissola playing chess. The older woman is their maidservant.)

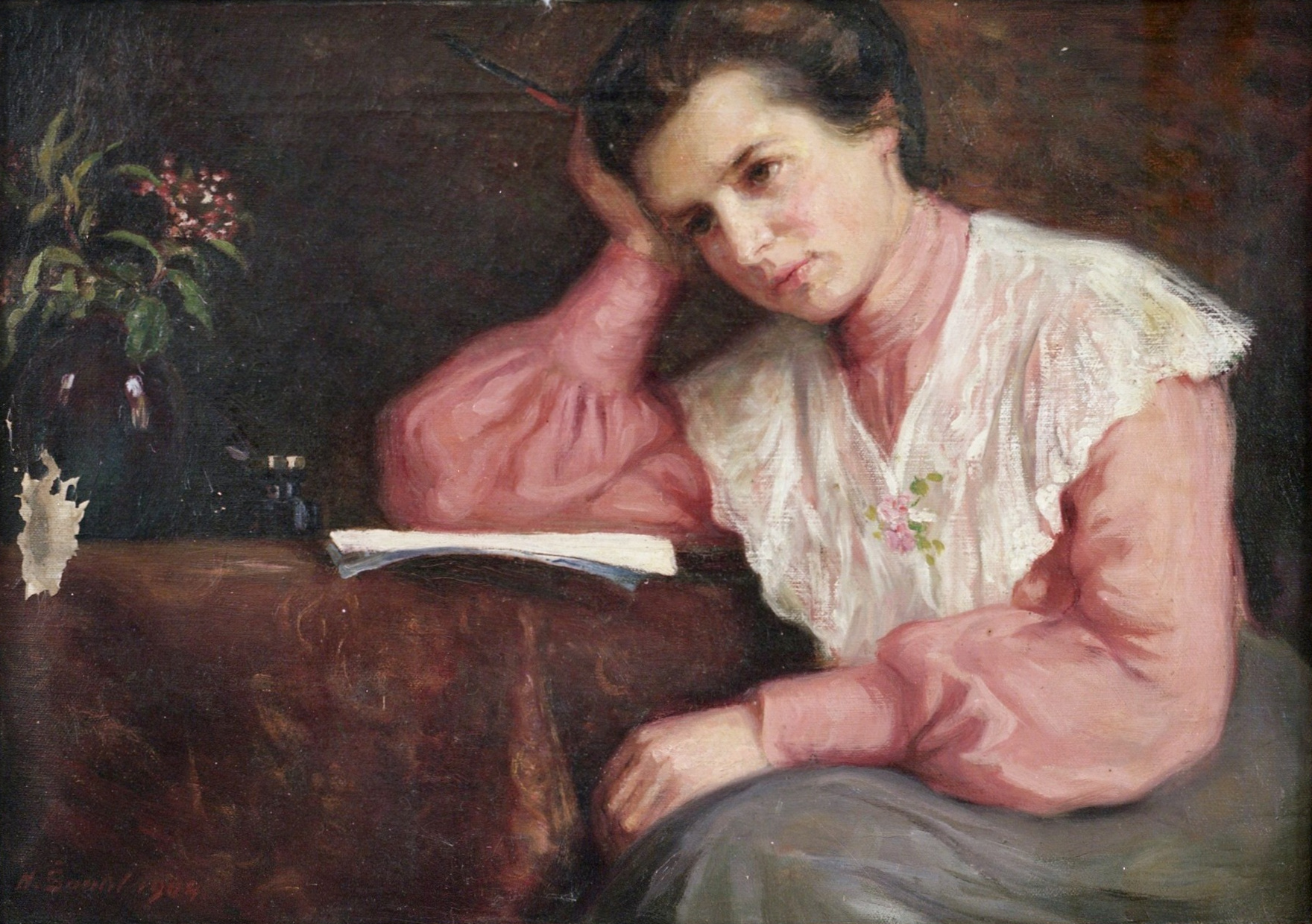
The Artist's sister Danica Šantel by Henrika Šantel

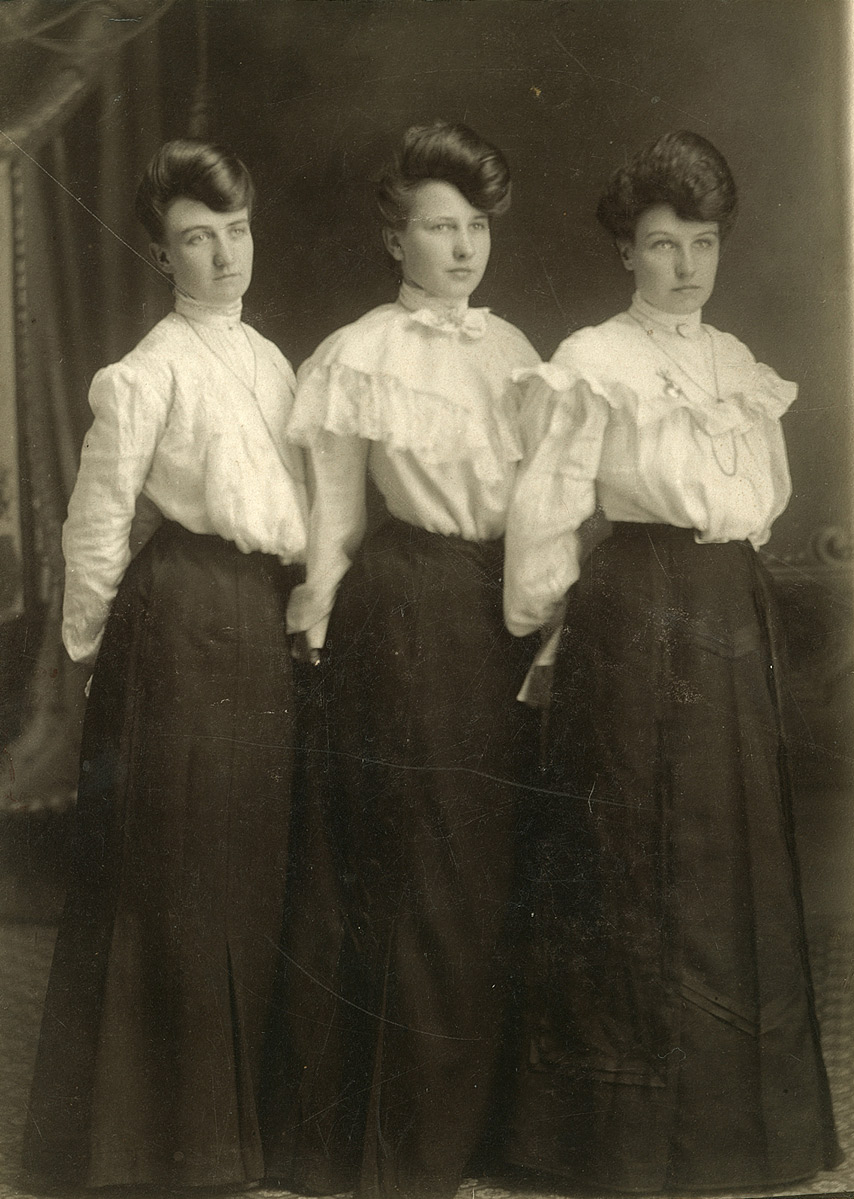
Three sisters from the Spencer family, c. 1902.

Pair of sisters, c. 2025.

A sister is a woman or a girl who shares parents or a parent with another individual; a female sibling. The male counterpart is a brother. Although the term typically refers to a familial relationship, it is sometimes used endearingly to refer to non-familial relationships. A full sister is a first-degree relative.

== Overview ==
The English word sister comes from Old Norse systir which itself derives from Proto-Germanic *swestēr, both of which have the same meaning, i.e. sister. Some studies have found that sisters display more traits indicating jealousy around their siblings than their male counterparts, brothers. In some cultures, sisters are afforded a role of being under the protection by male siblings, especially older brothers, from issues ranging from bullies or sexual advances by womanizers. In some quarters, the term sister has gradually broadened its colloquial meaning to include individuals stipulating kinship. In response, in order to avoid equivocation, some publishers prefer the usage of female sibling over sister. Males with a twin sister sometimes view her as their female alter ego, or what they would have been like if they had two X chromosomes. A study in Perth, Australia found that girls having only younger brothers resulted in a chastity effect: losing their virginity on average more than a year later than average. This has been hypothesized as being attributed to the pheromones in their brothers' sweat and household-related errands.

== Sororal relationships ==
Various studies have shown that older sisters are likely to give a varied gender role to their younger siblings, as well as being more likely to develop a close bond with their younger siblings. Older sisters are more likely to play with their younger siblings. Younger siblings display more needy behavior when near their older sister and are more likely to be tolerant of an older sister's bad behavior. Boys with only one older sister are more likely to display stereotypically male behavior, and such masculine boys increased their masculine behavior with the more sisters they have. The reverse is true for young boys with several sisters, as they tend to be feminine, however, they outgrow this by the time they approach pubescence. Boys with older sisters were less likely to be delinquent or have emotional and behavioral disorders. A younger sister is less likely to be scolded by older siblings than a younger brother. The most common recreational activity between older brother/younger sister pairs is art drawing. Some studies also found a correlation between having an older sister and constructive discussions about safe sexual practices. Some studies have shown that men without sisters are more likely to be ineffectual at courtship and romantic relationships.

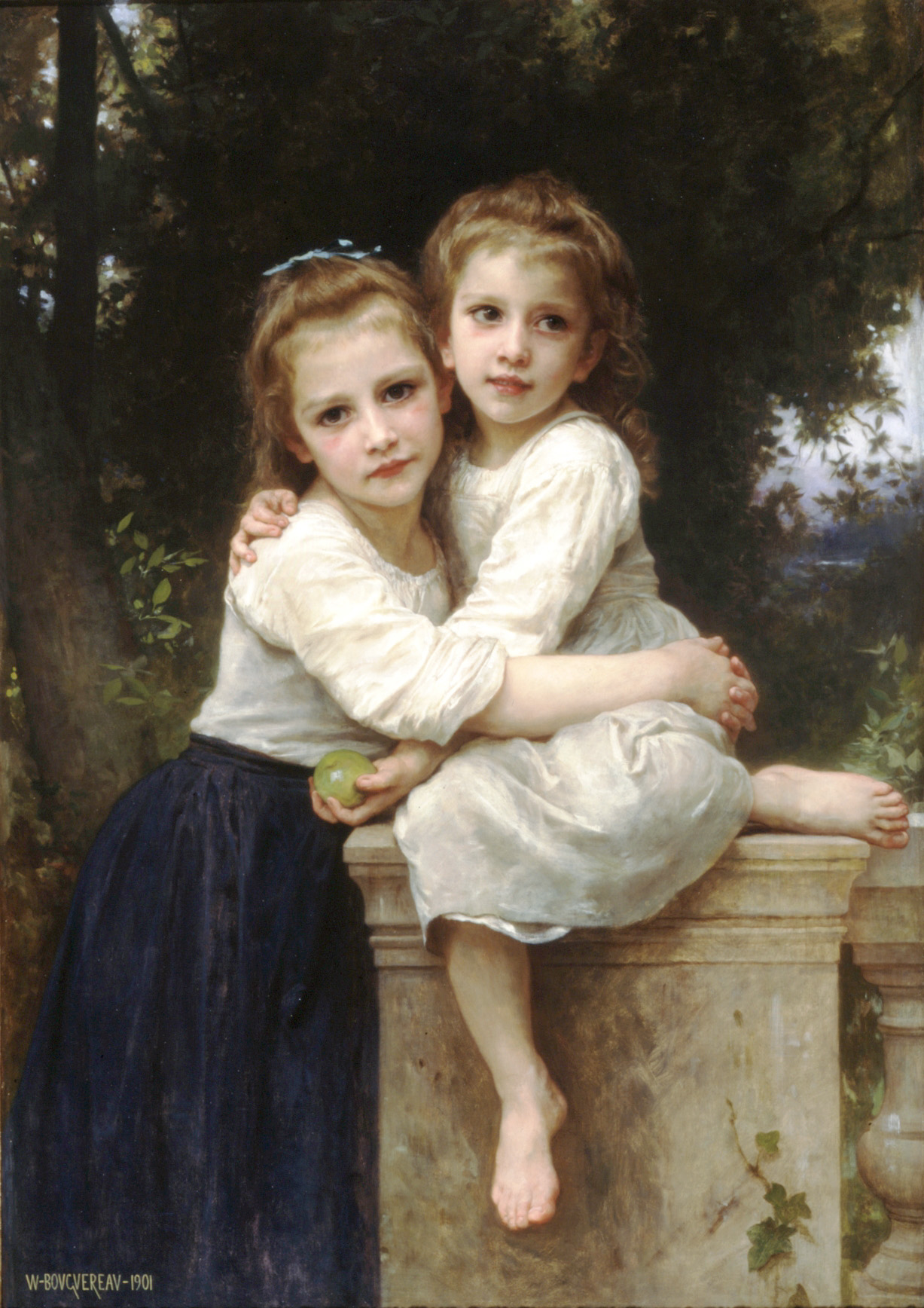
Two Sisters by William-Adolphe Bouguereau

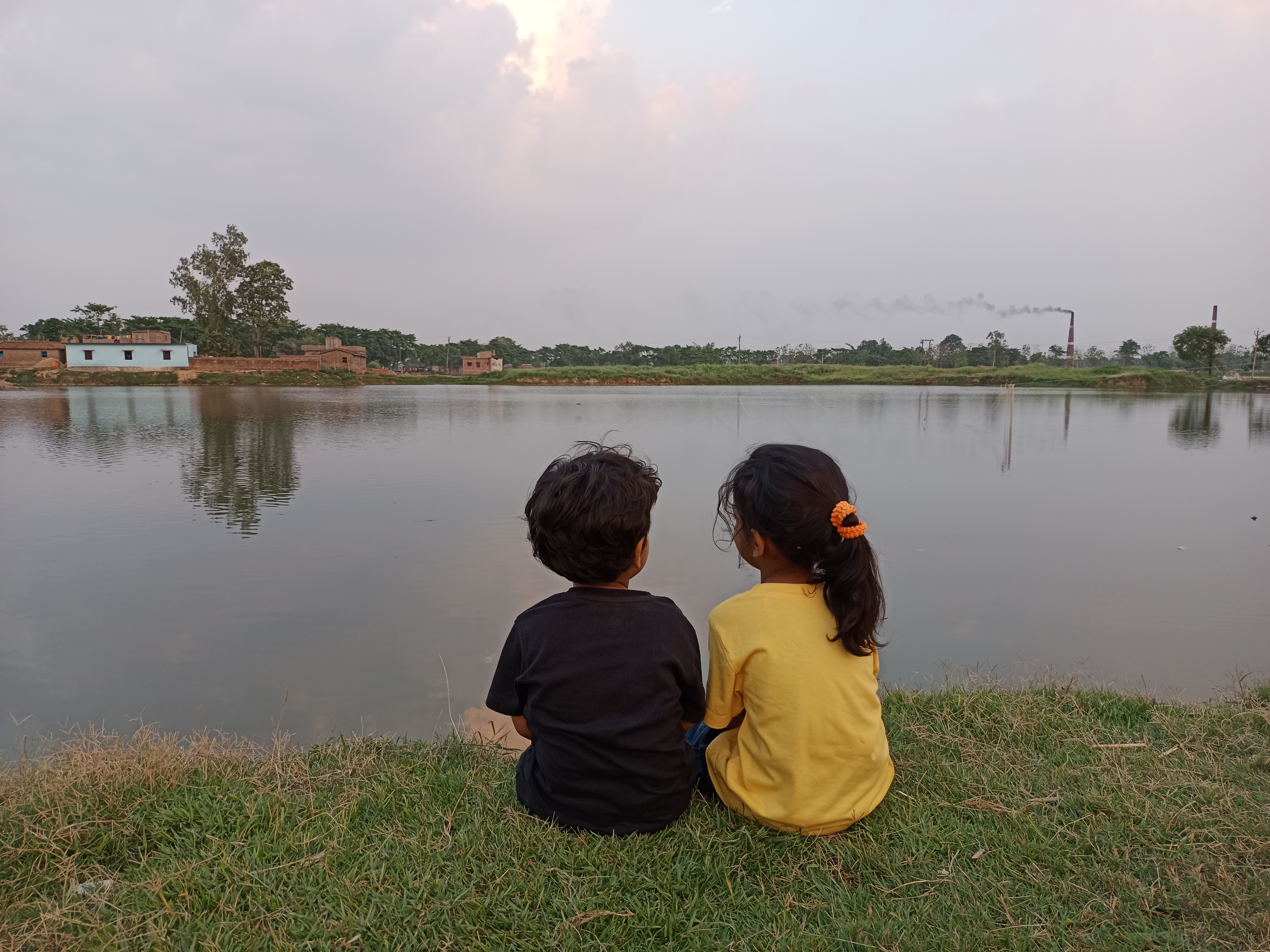
Two sisters in Bihar, India. in 2022

== See also ==
- Brother
- Religious sister
- Sisterhood (disambiguation)
- Stepsibling
