= The Brothers (novella) =

1986 novella by C. J. Cherryh

- Short story by C. J. Cherryh
- Language: English
- Genre: Fantasy

Publication
- Publisher: DAW Books in Visible Light
- Publication date: 1986
- Publication place: United States
- Media type: Print (hardback)

Chronology
—	Faery in Shadow

Visible Light (DAW Books 1986), where "The Brothers" was first published.

"The Brothers" is a fantasy novella by American writer C. J. Cherryh. It was first published by DAW Books in 1986 in Visible Light, a collection of her short fiction, and was republished in 2004 in The Collected Short Fiction of C. J. Cherryh.

The story draws on Celtic mythology and includes the realm of Faery and the fay race of the Sídhe. Cherryh's 1994 novel Faery in Shadow is a sequel to this novella.

A minor revision of "The Brothers" and a major rewrite of Faery in Shadow was self-published by Cherryh as an e-book in Faery Moon in December 2009.

== Plot summary ==
"The Brothers" is a story of two valleys, Gleann Gleatharan, ruled by Cinnfhail of Dun Gorm, and Gleann Fiach, ruled by Sliabhin of Dun Mhor. Separating the two valleys is a Sidhe-wood, which Dun Gorm respectfully keeps out of, but in which Dun Mhor defiantly hunts. The Sidhe have blessed Gleann Gleatharan with peace and good fortune, but cursed Gleann Fiach with bad luck and misery. Sliabhin is also cursed by the Sidhe for committing fratricide, killing his older brother Gaelan to seize Dun Mhor and Gaelan's queen, Moralach. Moralach had two children, Caith and later Brian, both during Gaelan's reign, but Caith was exiled soon after birth to live with Gaelan's cousin Hagan of Dun na nGall. After Sliabhin became king, Moralach hanged herself.

Caith grows up believing that Gaelan is his father and when he learns that Sliabhin murdered Gaelan, and that he has a younger brother, now in Sliabhin's hands, he returns to revenge his father's death and rescue Brian. As he passes through Gleann Gleatharan, he is told that Sliabhin raped Moralach and is his real father; this increases his resolve to rid Dun Mhor of Sliabhin and free Brian. Cinnfhail, uneasy that Caith's meddling may disturb Gleann Gleatharan's peace, reluctantly lends Caith his fay horse Dathuil. Dathuil takes Caith straight to the Sidhe wood where he meets Nuallan, of the Sidhe Fair Folk, and Dubhain, a mischievous shapeshifting pooka. They bargain with Caith, who ends up losing everything he has, including Dathuil, in exchange for their help in overthrowing Sliabhin and freeing Brian. Caith and Dubhain, alternating between a black horse and a boy, set off for Dun Mhor.

Meanwhile, Cinnfhail's son, Raghallach, rides to the Sidhe-wood to find and assist Caith, but is stopped by Nuallan. At Dun Mhor, Caith and Dubhain are let in and taken to Sliabhin, who shows them Raghallach, captured and tortured. But a discrete smile from Raghallach reveals to Caith that it is actually Nuallan in disguise. Caith and Dubhain themselves are imprisoned, and Caith bargains away his scruples for help from Dubhain in freeing them and rescuing Brian. Dubhain, as the horse, takes Caith through the locked door and down to a cellar containing Brian locked in a cage, a shackled and disfigured Raghallach/Nuallan, and Sliabhin. The chains holding Raghallach suddenly fall away and Nuallan escapes with Brian, leaving Caith to confront Sliabhin. Caith kills Sliabhin, escapes the dun and is taken by Dubhain back to the Sidhe-wood.

In the wood, Caith sees a group of Fair Folk around a sleeping Brian, but they will not let Caith near his brother. Nearby Raghallach sits on his horse, frozen-in-time, and Nuallan puts Brian in Raghallach's arms, letting Raghallach believe that he rescued Brian from Dun Mhor. Nuallan then takes Caith into Faery from where Caith looks down on Dun Gorm and sees an older Brian playing happily. Nuallan offers to take Brian's happiness and give it to Caith, but Caith refuses. Caith is returned to the wood where he is cursed with torment for the rest of his life for committing patricide. Not permitted to return to Dun Gorm or Dun Mhor and with nowhere else to go, the wayward Dubhain appears at his side and offers to be his companion. Caith reluctantly agrees.

== Characters ==
=== Humans ===
- Cinnfhail – king of Dun Gorm in Gleann Gleatharan; lives in harmony with the nearby forest-Sidhe who have blessed his kingdom
- Samhadh – Cinnfhail's queen
- Raghallach – Cinnfhail's son
- Gaelan – former king of Dun Mhor in nearby Gleann Fiach
- Sliabhin – Gaelan's younger brother and present king of Dun Mhor after seizing power from Gaelan; is disrespectful of the Sidhe who have damned him for committing fratricide and cursed his kingdom
- Moralach – Gaelan's queen, later Sliabhin's queen after he seized power
- Caith – Sliabhin's son by Moralach; exiled soon after birth for his safety to a relative at the distant Dun na nGall; cursed by the Sidhe for committing patricide
- Brian – Gaelan's son by Moralach, and Caith's younger brother; held captive by Sliabhin at Dun Mhor

=== Sidhe ===
- Nuallan – an elf of the Fair Folk, the Bright or Daoine Sidhe
- Dubhain – a mischievous shapeshifting pooka of the Dark Sidhe; bound to the bidding of the Bright Sidhe
- Dathuil – Cinnfhail's fay horse, given to Caith
