= Brothers in Arms =

Brothers in Arms may refer to:

== Literature ==
- Brothers in Arms (Bujold novel), a novel by Lois McMaster Bujold
- Brothers in Arms (Dragonlance novel), a Raistlin Chronicles novel by Margaret Weis and Don Perrin
- Brothers in Arms, a 2004 young adult novel in The Bluford Series by Paul Langan and Ben Alirez
- Brothers in Arms, a title in the comics series Star Wars: Clone Wars
- Brothers in Arms: A Novel, a novel by Hans Hellmut Kirst
- Brothers In Arms: The Kennedys, the Castros, and the Politics of Murder, a 2008 non-fiction book by Gus Russo and Stephen Molton.

== Music ==
- Brothers in Arms (album), by Dire Straits, 1985
  - "Brothers in Arms" (song), the title song
- Brothers in Arms, an album by Joan Baez, 1991
- "Brothers in Arms", a song composed by Martin O'Donnell and Michael Salvatori from Halo Original Soundtrack, 2002
- "Brothers in Arms", a song by Bon Jovi from 2020
- "Brothers in Arms", a song by Junkie XL from the Mad Max: Fury Road film soundtrack, 2015

== Television and film ==
- Brothers in Arms (TV series), a 2026 Japanese historical drama television series
- "Brothers in Arms" (Arrow), an episode of Arrow
- "Brothers in Arms" (Defiance), an episode of Defiance
- "Brothers in Arms" (Highlander), an episode of Highlander: The Series
- "Brothers in Arms" (NCIS), an episode of NCIS
- "Brothers in Arms" (NCIS: Sydney), an episode of NCIS: Sydney
- "Brothers in Arms" (Robin Hood), an episode of Robin Hood
- Universal Soldier II: Brothers in Arms, a 1999 television movie sequel to the 1992 film Universal Soldier
- Bikie Wars: Brothers in Arms, a 2012 Australian television drama mini-series
- Semper Fi (film), a 2019 crime drama also known as Brothers in Arms

== Video games ==
- Brothers in Arms (video game series), a video game series by Gearbox software
  - Brothers in Arms: Road to Hill 30, the 2005 first game in the series
  - Brothers in Arms: Earned in Blood, the sequel of the first game, released several months after the original
  - Brothers in Arms: Hell's Highway, third instalment of the series
  - Brothers in Arms (2008 video game)

== Other uses ==
- Brothers in Arms (organization), a 2023 Israeli judicial reform protest group
- The Shield (professional wrestling) (also known as the Brothers in Arms), a wrestling trio comprising Dean Ambrose, Seth Rollins and Roman Reigns
