= Fraternity (disambiguation) =

A fraternity is an organisation of men.

Fraternity may also refer to:

== Associations ==
- Benefit society
- Chivalric order
- Fraternal order
- Friendly society
- Honor society, an organization which recognizes achievement
- Religious order
- Secret society
- Social club
- Trade union

== Academic and student fraternities ==
=== Europe ===
- Corporation (university), college fraternity; for example German Student Corps
- Nation (university), student organization
- Studentenverbindung, student organizations in Germany
- Student society
- Students' union

=== North America ===
- College fraternities and sororities, also called Greek letter organizations or social fraternities
- Collegiate secret societies in North America, organizations with secret membership
- Literary society
- Professional fraternities and sororities, members connected by professional field of study
- Service fraternities and sororities, organizations whose primary purpose is community service

== Sociology ==
- Fraternity (philosophy), a type of relationship between people

== Other uses ==
- Fraternity (band), an Australian rock group from the early 1970s, featuring AC/DC's Bon Scott
- Fraternity Records, a record label

== See also ==
- List of general fraternities
- List of social fraternities
- List of social sororities and women's fraternities
- North American fraternity and sorority housing
- Brotherhood (disambiguation)
