= The BBC Presents: Philip Marlowe =

The BBC Presents: Philip Marlowe was a series of BBC radio drama adaptations of novels by Raymond Chandler that ran from 1977 to 1978, and again in 1988. The radio show adapted six out of the seven of Chandlers novels starring Philip Marlowe, played by Ed Bishop. The show was adapted by Bill Morrison and produced by John Tydeman. Other actors featured included Don Fellows and Robert Beatty,

The ten-year gap between the release of The Long Goodbye and Farewell My Lovely was due to the rights for the latter being unavailable (being held by the makers of the 1975 film adaptation).

The shows were released on CD under the BBC Radio Collection label between 2001 and 2004.

== Episodes ==
- The Big Sleep (1977)
- The High Window (1977)
- The Lady in the Lake (1977)
- The Little Sister (1977)
- The Long Goodbye (1978)
- Farewell My Lovely (1988)

== Classic Chandler ==
In 2011, Radio 4 produced a season of new Chandler adaptations under the banner-title of Classic Chandler. The Big Sleep, The High Window, The Lady in the Lake, The Little Sister, The Long Goodbye, and Farewell My Lovely were all dramatised once again, with Playback, and the posthumously published Poodle Springs being adapted too. Toby Stephens starred as Marlowe.
