= Philip Marlowe =

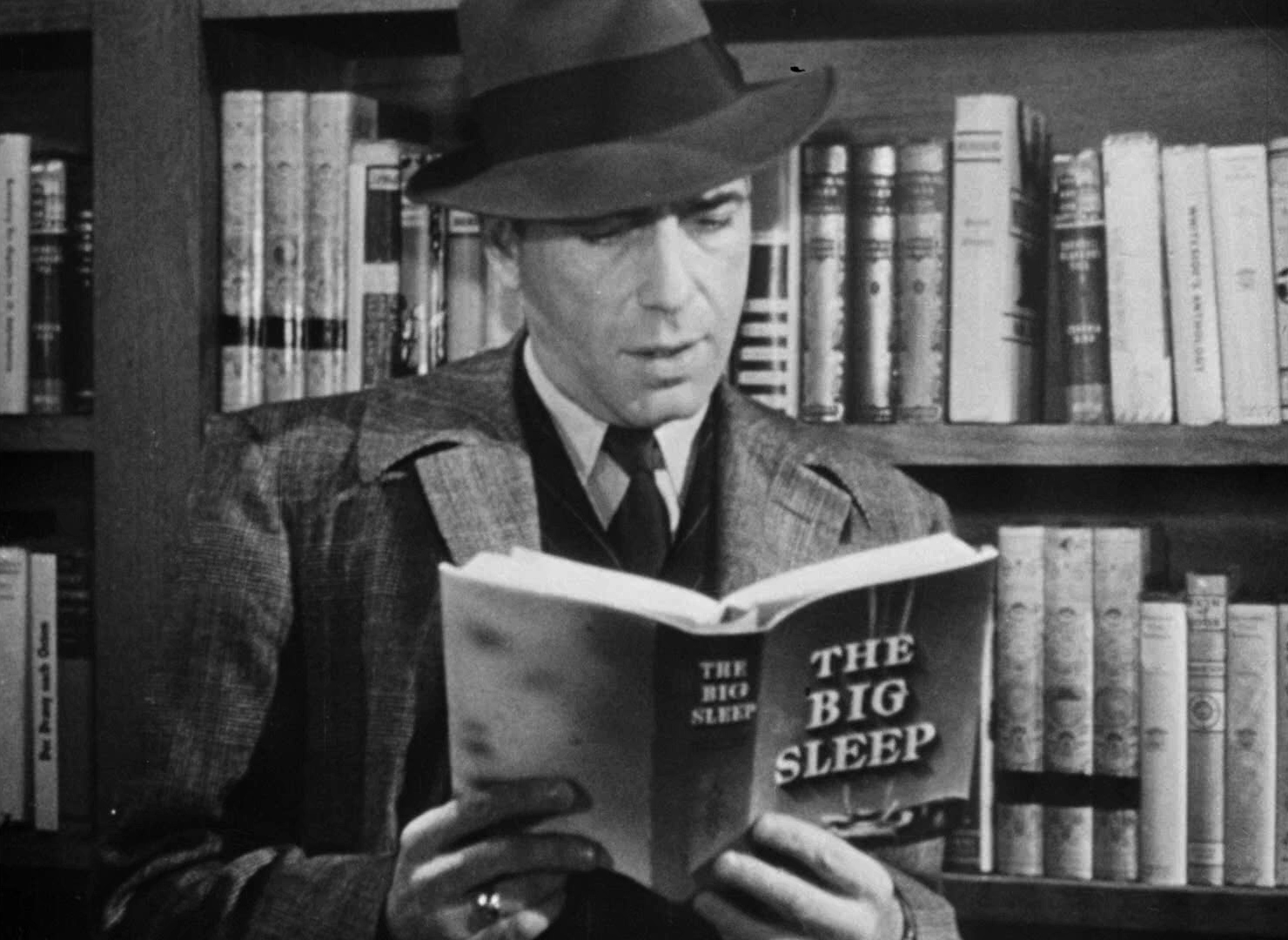
- Humphrey Bogart in the trailer for the 1946 film The Big Sleep
- First appearance: "Finger Man" (short story); The Big Sleep (novel)
- Last appearance: "The Pencil" (short story); Poodle Springs (unfinished novel, completed by Robert B. Parker)
- Created by: Raymond Chandler
- Portrayed by: Dick Powell (film, radio, TV); Humphrey Bogart (film); Van Heflin (radio); Robert Montgomery (film, radio); George Montgomery (film); Gerald Mohr (radio); Philip Carey (TV); James Garner (film); Elliott Gould (film); Robert Mitchum (film); Ed Bishop (BBC radio); Powers Boothe (TV); Danny Glover (TV); James Caan (HBO film); Jason O'Mara (TV pilot); Toby Stephens (BBC radio); Tomáš Hanák (Czech film); Liam Neeson (film)

In-universe information
- Gender: Male
- Occupation: Private detective
- Nationality: American

Philip Marlowe (/ˈmɑːrloʊ/ MAR-loh) is a fictional private detective created by Raymond Chandler who was characteristic of the hardboiled crime fiction genre. The genre originated in the 1920s, notably in Black Mask magazine, in which Dashiell Hammett's The Continental Op and Sam Spade first appeared. Though Marlowe first appeared under that name in The Big Sleep (1939), Chandler's early short stories, published in pulp magazines such as Black Mask and Dime Detective since 1933, starred various prototype detectives with names like "Carmady" and "John Dalmas."

Several of the aforementioned short stories, when republished in the collection The Simple Art of Murder (1950), changed the names of the protagonists to Philip Marlowe (these are not to be confused with the stories Chandler directly combined and expanded – "cannibalized" – into Marlowe novels, which were generally blocked from any republication during his lifetime, and saw no text alterations in later republications).

Underneath the wisecracking, hard-drinking, tough 'private eye' exterior, Marlowe is quietly contemplative, philosophical and enjoys chess and poetry. While he is not afraid to risk physical harm, he does not dish out violence merely to settle scores. Morally upright, he is not fooled by the genre's usual femmes fatales, such as Carmen Sternwood in The Big Sleep. Chandler's treatment of the detective novel exhibits an effort to develop the form. His first full-length book, The Big Sleep, was published when Chandler was 51; his last, Playback, when he was 70. He wrote seven novels in the last two decades of his life. An eighth, Poodle Springs, was completed posthumously by Robert B. Parker and published years later.

== Inspiration ==
Explaining the origin of Marlowe's character, Chandler commented, "Marlowe just grew out of the pulps. He was no one person". When creating the character, Chandler had originally intended to call him Mallory; his stories for the Black Mask featured characters that are considered precursors to Marlowe. The emergence of Marlowe coincided with Chandler's transition from writing short stories to novels.

The Cahuenga Building, where Phillip Marlowe's office is located, is widely believed to be inspired by the Security Trust and Savings located on Hollywood Boulevard in Hollywood, California.

== Biographical notes ==
Philip Marlowe is a Los Angeles-based private detective created by Raymond Chandler in a series of novels including The Big Sleep; Farewell, My Lovely; and The Long Goodbye. Chandler is not consistent as to Marlowe's age. In The Big Sleep, set in 1936, Marlowe's age is given as 33, while in The Long Goodbye (set 14 years later), Marlowe is 42. In a letter to D. J. Ibberson dated April 19, 1951, Chandler noted among other things that Marlowe is 38 years old and was born in Santa Rosa, California. He had a couple of years at college and some experience as an investigator for an insurance company and the district attorney's office of Los Angeles County. He was fired from the DA's office for insubordination (or as Marlowe put it, "talking back"). The DA's chief investigator, Bernie Ohls, is a friend and former colleague and a source of information for Marlowe within law enforcement.

As with his age, Chandler is not consistent as to Marlowe's height: in The Long Goodbye he is described as being "six feet, one half inch", while in Farewell My Lovely Marlowe describes one of his clients, Lindsay Marriott, as having "an inch more of height than I had, which made him six feet one" – meaning Marlowe is six feet tall himself. He weighs about 190 lb (86 kg). He is described as having dark hair and a medium heavy build (Farewell, My Lovely); dark brown hair with some grey and brown eyes (The Long Good-bye). Marlowe first lived at the Hobart Arms, on Franklin Avenue near North Kenmore Avenue (in The Big Sleep) but then moved to the Bristol Hotel, where he stayed for about 10 years. By 1950 (in The Long Good-bye) he has rented a house on Yucca Avenue in Laurel Canyon and continued at the same place in early 1952 in Playback, Chandler's last full-length Marlowe novel.

His office, originally on the seventh floor of an unnamed building in 1936, is at #615 on the sixth floor of the Cahuenga Building by March–April 1939 (the date of Farewell, My Lovely), which is on Hollywood Boulevard near Ivar. North Ivar Avenue is between North Cahuenga Boulevard to the west and Vine Street to the east. The office telephone number is GLenview 7537. Marlowe's office is modest and he does not have a secretary (unlike Sam Spade). He generally refuses to take divorce cases.

He drinks whiskey or brandy frequently and in relatively large quantities. For example, in The High Window, he gets out a bottle of Four Roses and pours glasses for him, Det. Lt. Breeze and Spangler. At other times, he is drinking Old Forester, a Kentucky bourbon: "I hung up and fed myself a slug of Old Forester to brace my nerves for the interview. As I was inhaling it I heard her steps tripping along the corridor". (The Little Sister) However, in Playback he orders a double Gibson at a bar while tailing Betty Mayfield. Also, in The Long Good-bye, Terry Lennox and he drink Gimlets; in the same novel he also orders a whiskey sour and drinks Cordon Rouge champagne with Linda Loring.

Marlowe is adept at using liquor to loosen peoples' tongues. An example is in The High Window, when Marlowe finally persuades the detective-lieutenant, whose "solid old face was lined and grey with fatigue", to take a drink: "Breeze looked at me very steadily. Then he sighed. Then he picked the glass up and tasted it and sighed again and shook his head sideways with a half smile; the way a man does when you give him a drink and he needs it very badly and it is just right and the first swallow is like a peek into a cleaner, sunnier, brighter world."

He frequently drinks coffee. Eschewing the use of filters (see Farewell, My Lovely), he uses a vacuum coffee maker (see The Long Good-bye, chapter 5). He smokes and prefers Camel cigarettes. At home and at his office (see Playback) he sometimes smokes a pipe. A chess adept, he is often described as playing games against himself or setting out and duplicating historical tournament games from books as a means of relaxation or clearing his head.

As is typical of pulp fiction private eyes from Sherlock Holmes onward, Marlowe is a bachelor throughout most of the novels. That he has sex with female characters is explicit or implied in each of the novels, but he is also shown resisting various sexual invitations and refusing to take advantage of other sexual opportunities on moral grounds. In The Long Goodbye the divorced daughter of the press tycoon Harlan Potter, Linda Loring (with whom he has spent one night of passion), asks Marlowe to go with her to Paris, but he declines. Then, at the end of the next novel, Playback (set some 18 months later), Loring phones him from Paris and asks him again to join her ("I'm asking you to marry me"). Marlowe challenges her to come to him in L.A. instead, implicitly testing her sincerity. In the opening paragraphs of Poodle Springs he has just married her.

== Marlowe bibliography ==
=== By Raymond Chandler ===
==== Novels ====
- The Big Sleep (1939)
- Farewell, My Lovely (1940)
- The High Window (1942)
- The Lady in the Lake (1943)
- The Little Sister (1949)
- The Long Goodbye (1953)
- Playback (1958)
- The Poodle Springs Story in Raymond Chandler Speaking (1962) (only the first four chapters were completed at Chandler's death in 1959; Robert B. Parker extended the unfinished material to a full-length novel, Poodle Springs, in 1989.)

==== Short stories ====
During his lifetime, Chandler finished only one short story "originally" starring Marlowe, published posthumously. This was his first detective short story in 20 years, and his last complete work overall:

- "The Pencil" (April 1959, Daily Mail; or "Marlowe Takes On the Syndicate", "Wrong Pigeon" and "Philip Marlowe's Last Case").

The following short stories, originally starring different detectives, were retroactively made into Marlowe stories when republished in The Simple Art of Murder (1950), and remain so in most modern collections:

- "Finger Man" (October 1934, Black Mask; original protagonist unnamed)
- "Goldfish" (June 1936, Black Mask; Carmady)
- "Red Wind" (January 1938, Dime Detective; John Dalmas)
- "Trouble Is My Business" (August 1939, Dime Detective; John Dalmas)

Several of Chandler's other short stories, though not given the above treatment in text publications, were also reworked into Marlowe stories for the television series Philip Marlowe, Private Eye:

- "Blackmailers Don't Shoot" (December 1933, Black Mask; original protagonist named Mallory)
- "Smart-Aleck Kill" (July 1934, Black Mask; Mallory)
- "Nevada Gas" (June 1935, Black Mask; Johnny de Ruse)
- "Spanish Blood" (November 1935, Black Mask; Sam Delaguerra)
- "Guns at Cyrano's" (January 1936, Black Mask; Ted Malvern)
- "Noon Street Nemesis" (or "Pick-up on Noon Street"; May 1936, Detective Fiction Weekly; Pete Anglich)
- "The King in Yellow" (March 1938, Dime Detective; Steve Grayce)

=== By other writers ===
==== Short stories ====
- El Diez Por Ciento de Vida by Hiber Conteris (Spain, 1985), English translation as Ten Percent of Life by Deborah Bergmann (1987, ISBN 9-780671-634193). Marlowe probes the 1956 "suicide" of a Hollywood literary agent, one of whose clients is Raymond Chandler.
- Raymond Chandler's Philip Marlowe: A Centennial Celebration, ed. Byron Preiss (1988, ISBN 1-59687-847-9; extended edition 1999, ISBN 0-671-03890-7); reprints "The Pencil" alongside Philip Marlowe stories by other authors:
  - "The Perfect Crime" by Max Allan Collins
  - "The Black-Eyed Blonde" by Benjamin M. Schutz
  - "Gun Music" by Loren D. Estleman
  - "Saving Grace" by Joyce Harrington
  - "Malibu Tag Team" by Jonathan Valin
  - "Sad-Eyed Blonde" by Dick Lochte
  - "The Empty Sleeve" by W. R. Philbrick
  - "Dealer's Choice" by Sara Paretsky
  - "Red Rock" by Julie Smith
  - "The Deepest South" by Paco Ignacio Taibo II
  - "Consultation in the Dark" by Francis M. Nevins Jr.
  - "In the Jungle of Cities" by Roger L. Simon
  - "Star Bright" by John Lutz
  - "Stardust Kill" by Simon Brett
  - "Locker 246" by Robert J. Randisi
  - "Bitter Lemons" by Stuart M. Kaminsky
  - "The Man Who Knew Dick Bong" by Robert Crais
  - "Essence D'Orient" by Edward D. Hoch
  - "In the Line of Duty" by Jeremiah Healey
  - "The Alibi" by Ed Gorman
  - "The Devil's Playground" by James Grady
  - "Asia" by Eric Van Lustbader
  - "Mice" by Robert Campbell
  - "Sixty-Four Squares" by J. Madison Davis (1999 edition)
  - "Summer in Idle Valley" by Roger L. Simon (1999 edition)

==== Novels ====
- Poodle Springs (1989, ISBN 0-399-13482-4), by Robert B. Parker. An authorized completion of Chandler's unfinished last work; the original text 'The Poodle Springs Story' had been published alongside excerpts from Chandler's letters, notes and essays in Raymond Chandler Speaking (1962).
- Perchance to Dream (1991, ISBN 0-399-13580-4), by Robert B. Parker. An authorized sequel to Chandler's The Big Sleep.
- The Black-Eyed Blonde (2014), by John Banville writing as "Benjamin Black," is an authorized sequel to The Long Goodbye, and reuses the title of Benjamin M. Schutz's otherwise-unrelated Marlowe story.
- Only to Sleep (2018), by Lawrence Osborne, finds the elderly Marlowe in Mexico in 1988, investigating the “accidental” swimming death of a debt-ridden con man/developer.
- The Goodbye Coast (2022), by Joe Ide, a reimagining of the character, set in present-day Los Angeles.
- The Second Murderer (2023), by Denise Mina

== Film adaptations ==
Trailer for Lady in the Lake (1947)

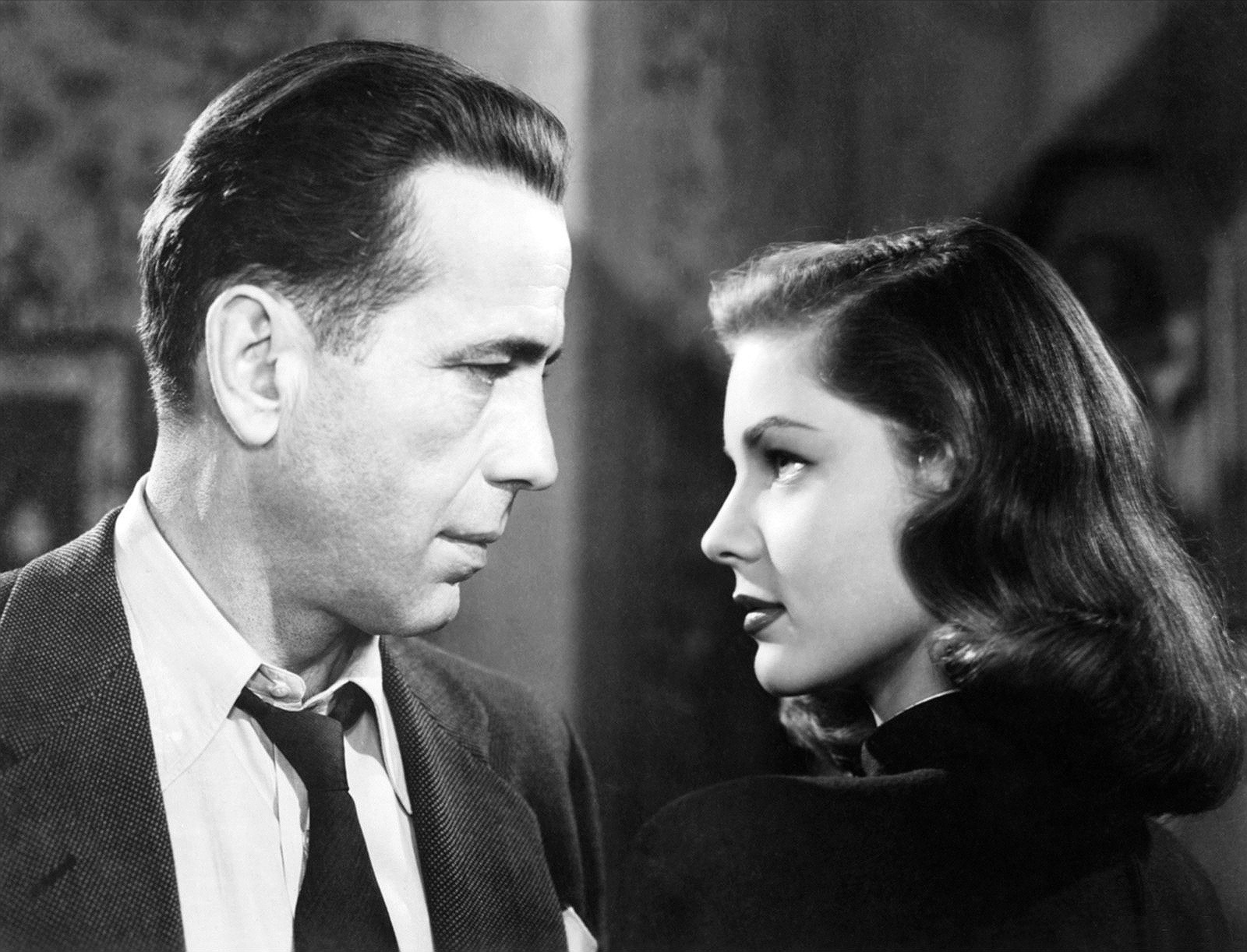
Photo of Humphrey Bogart and Lauren Bacall from the 1946 film The Big Sleep

- The Falcon Takes Over (1942) – (adaptation of Farewell, My Lovely with detective "The Falcon" substituting for Marlowe) George Sanders as The Falcon.
- Time to Kill (1942) – (adaptation of The High Window with detective Michael Shayne substituting for Marlowe) Lloyd Nolan as Shayne.
- Murder, My Sweet (1944) – (adaptation of [and released in the UK as] Farewell, My Lovely) Dick Powell as Marlowe.
- The Big Sleep (1946) – Humphrey Bogart as Marlowe.
- Lady in the Lake (1947) – Robert Montgomery as Phillip Marlowe ("Phillip" is spelled with two "l"s in this film.)
- The Brasher Doubloon (1947) – (adaptation of [and released in the UK as] The High Window) George Montgomery as Marlowe.
- Marlowe (1969) – (adaptation of The Little Sister) James Garner as Marlowe. This became the partial inspiration for The Rockford Files, the other being the series Maverick.
- The Long Goodbye (1973) – Elliott Gould as Marlowe.
- Farewell, My Lovely (1975) – Robert Mitchum as Marlowe.
- The Big Sleep (1978) – Robert Mitchum as Marlowe.
- Marlowe (2022) – (adaptation of The Black-Eyed Blonde by Benjamin Black) Liam Neeson as Marlowe.

== Radio and television adaptations ==
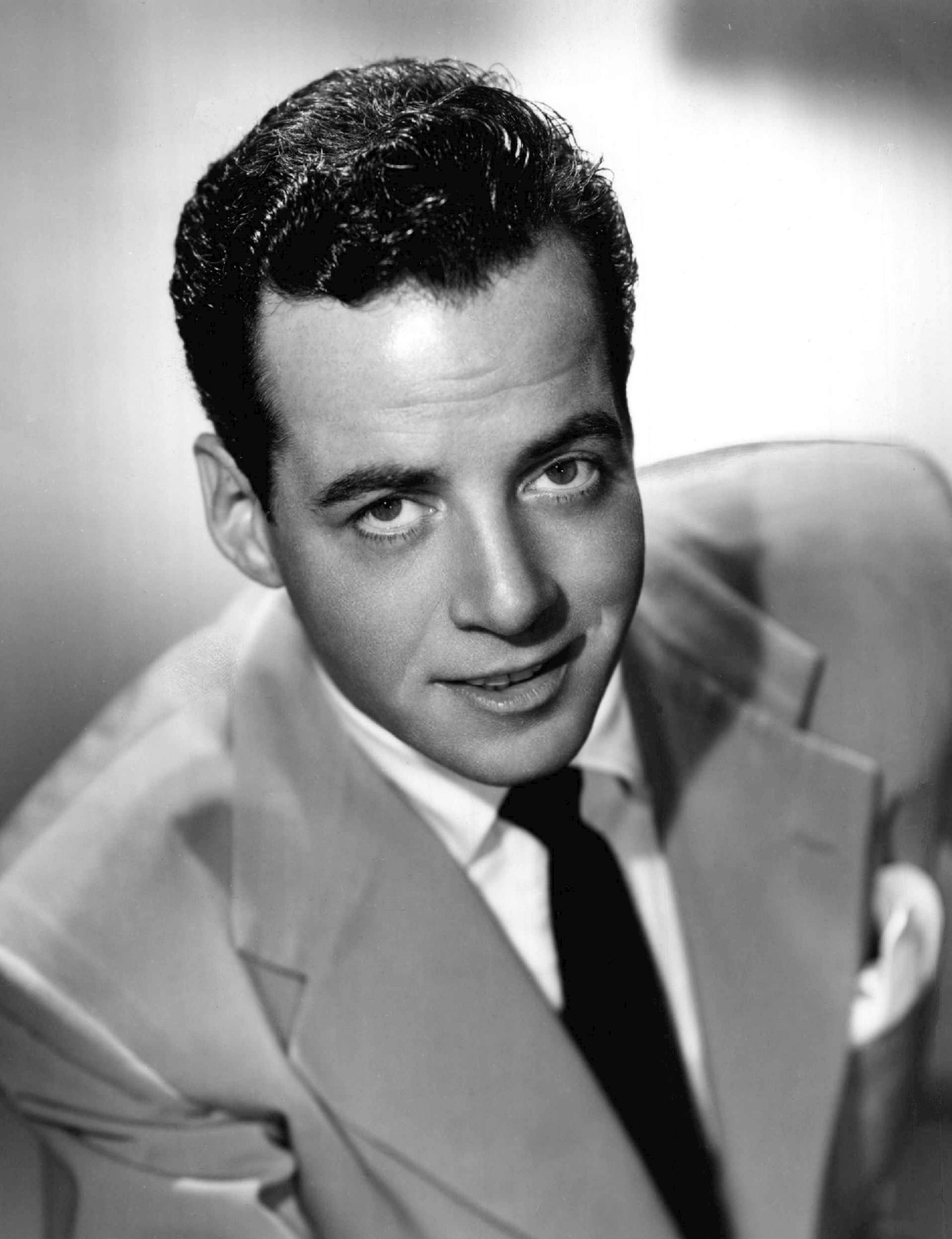
Gerald Mohr in the CBS Radio series The Adventures of Philip Marlowe (1948–1951)

=== Radio ===
- Lux Radio Theater, "Murder My Sweet", adapted from the 1944 film, CBS Radio, June 11, 1945 (Dick Powell as Marlowe)
- The New Adventures of Philip Marlowe, NBC Radio series, June 17, 1947, to September 9, 1947 (Van Heflin as Marlowe)
- Suspense, CBS radio, January 10, 1948 (cameo by series host Robert Montgomery in The Adventures of Sam Spade cross-over, "The Kandy Tooth")
- Lux Radio Theater, "Lady in the Lake", adapted from the 1947 film, CBS Radio, February 9, 1948 (Robert Montgomery as Marlowe)
- Hollywood Star Time, "Murder My Sweet", adapted from the 1944 film, CBS Radio, June 8, 1948 (Dick Powell as Marlowe)
- The Adventures of Philip Marlowe, CBS Radio series, September 26, 1948, to September 15, 1951 (Gerald Mohr as Marlowe)
- The BBC Presents: Philip Marlowe, BBC Radio series, September 26, 1977, to September 23, 1988 (Ed Bishop as Marlowe)
- In 2011 the BBC started a series of radio adaptations of all the Philip Marlowe novels under the heading Classic Chandler. Toby Stephens played Philip Marlowe throughout. The series started on February 5, 2011, on BBC Radio 4 with a 90-minute adaptation of The Big Sleep and continued with adaptations of The Lady in the Lake (February 12, 2011), Farewell, My Lovely (February 19, 2011) and a 60-minute version of Playback (February 26, 2011). The series continued later that year with 90-minute adaptations of The Long Goodbye (October 1, 2011), The High Window (October 8, 2011), The Little Sister (October 15, 2011) and a 60-minute version of Poodle Springs (October 22, 2011).

=== Television ===
- Robert Montgomery Presents, "The Big Sleep", adapted from the novel, NBC Television, September 25, 1950 (Zachary Scott as Marlowe)
- Climax!, "The Long Goodbye", adapted from the novel, CBS Television, October 7, 1954 (Dick Powell as Marlowe)
- Philip Marlowe, ABC Television series, October 6, 1959, to March 29, 1960 (Philip Carey as Marlowe)
- Philip Marlowe, Private Eye, HBO/London Weekend Television series, April 16, 1983, to May 14, 1983, April 27, 1986, to June 3, 1986 (Powers Boothe as Marlowe)
- Fallen Angels, "Red Wind", adapted from the short story, Showtime Television, November 26, 1995 (Danny Glover as Marlowe)
- Poodle Springs, adapted from the novel (a fragment completed by Robert B. Parker), HBO Television movie, July 25, 1998 (James Caan as Marlowe)
- Marlowe, a 2007 ABC TV pilot (Jason O'Mara as Marlowe)
- Upcoming series from Bad Robot Productions

== Theater adaptations ==
Marlowe has appeared on stage at least twice. An adaptation of The Little Sister in 1978 in Chicago starred Mike Genovese as Marlowe. In 1982, Richard Maher and Roger Michell wrote Private Dick, in which Chandler has lost the manuscript for a novel, and calls in Marlowe to help find it. The production played in London, with Robert Powell as Marlowe.

== Video game adaptations ==
- Philip Marlowe: Private Eye, Byron Preiss (developer), Simon & Schuster (publisher), 1996–1997

== See also ==
- Crime fiction for an overview
