= Farewell, My Lovely (disambiguation) =

Farewell, My Lovely is a 1940 novel by Raymond Chandler.

Farewell, My Lovely may also refer to:

- Murder, My Sweet, a 1944 American film based on the Chandler novel, released in the UK as Farewell, My Lovely
- Farewell, My Lovely (1975 film), an American film based on the Chandler novel
