= Philip Marlowe (disambiguation) =

Philip Marlowe is a fictional detective.

Philip Marlowe or Philip Marlow may also refer to:

== Radio ==
- The Adventures of Philip Marlowe, a CBS Radio series
- The BBC Presents: Philip Marlowe, a BBC Radio series
- The New Adventures of Philip Marlowe, an NBC Radio series

== Film ==
- Marlowe (1969 film)
- Marlowe (2022 film)

== Television ==
- Philip Marlowe (TV series), an ABC Television series
- Philip Marlowe, Private Eye, an HBO/London Weekend Television series
- Philip E. Marlow, lead character in The Singing Detective
