= Kathrine Sorley Walker =

Kathrine Sorley Walker (5 March 1920 – 14 April 2015) was a British writer, editor and critic with a particular focus on ballet. The author of many books on dance, she reviewed dance performances in a variety of outlets including Dancing Times and Dance International, as well as being the ballet critic for the Daily Telegraph for 24 years.

In addition to her writings on dance, she served as the co-editor for the literary estate of the American novelist and screenwriter Raymond Chandler following his death in 1959. After Chandler's death, his literary agent and lover Helga Greene and his private secretary Jean Fracasse entered into a legal battle over Chandler's estate. Following Greene's success in the courts, she hired Walker and Dorothy Gardiner to compile Chandler's letters, essays and unfinished novel into a book, Raymond Chandler Speaking. Walker worked for Greene's literary agency for 25 years, until Greene's death.

Walker co-wrote a history of The Royal Ballet as well as writing a biography of the company's founder Ninette de Valois. She wrote biographies of the sultan Saladin and the Sunday Times dance critic Cyril W. Beaumont. She contributed articles on Anna Pavlova, George Balanchine and Michel Fokine for the Encyclopædia Britannica. Her history of the De Basil Ballets Russes company (1982) is perhaps her major achievement.
