= Raymond Chandler's Philip Marlowe: a Centennial Celebration =

First edition (publ. Knopf)

Edited by Byron Preiss, Raymond Chandler's Philip Marlowe: a Centennial Celebration (ISBN 0-394-57327-7) is an anthology of short stories collected for the centenary of Raymond Chandler's birth, in 1988. Containing 23 stories by such noted crime-writers as Robert B. Parker, Sara Paretsky, Loren D. Estleman, Stuart M. Kaminsky, and Ed Gorman each tale takes place in one of the years that Philip Marlowe was active as a private eye (1935–1959). As well, the anthology includes The Pencil, Chandler's last Marlowe short story.

== Stories ==
- The Perfect Crime by Max Allan Collins
- The Black-Eyed Blonde by Benjamin M. Schutz
- Gun Music by Loren D. Estleman
- Saving Grace by Joyce Harrington
- Malibu Tag Team by Jonathan Valin
- Sad-Eyed Blonde by Dick Lochte
- The Empty Sleeve by W. R. Philbrick
- Dealer's Choice by Sara Paretsky
- Red Rock by Julie Smith
- The Deepest South by Paco Ignacio Taibo II
- Consultation in the Dark by Francis M. Nevins Jr.
- In the Jungle of Cities by Roger L. Simon
- Star Bright by John Lutz
- Stardust Kill by Simon Brett
- Locker 246 by Robert J. Randisi
- Bitter Lemons by Stuart M. Kaminsky
- The Man Who Knew Dick Bong by Robert Crais
- Essence D'Orient by Edward D. Hoch
- In the Line of Duty by Jeremiah Healy
- The Alibi by Ed Gorman
- The Devil's Playground by James Grady
- Asia by Eric Van Lustbader
- Mice by Robert Campbell
- The Pencil by Raymond Chandler

== Second Edition ==
A second edition, published in 1999, contained an additional two stories, as well as a new introduction by Robert B. Parker.

- Sixty-Four Squares by J. Madison Davis
- Summer in Idle Valley by Roger L. Simon
