= Private eye =

Private eye or Private Eye may refer to:

- Private investigator, a hired detective
- Private Eye, a British news, investigative and satirical magazine

== Film and television ==
- Private Eyes (1953 film), a film starring The Bowery Boys
- The Private Eyes (1976 film), a Hong Kong film starring Michael Hui
- The Private Eyes (1980 film) a film starring Don Knotts and Tim Conway
- Private Eye (TV series), a 1987–1988 American series starring Josh Brolin
- Private Eye (film), a 2009 South Korean film
- Private Eyes (TV series), a 2016 Canadian series starring Jason Priestley
- Private Eyes West Coast, a 2026 Canadian series starring Jason Priestley. A sequel/spin-off to Private Eyes

== Literature ==
- The Private Eye, a 2013 comics series by Brian K. Vaughan and Marcos Martín
- Private Eyes (play), a 1996 play by Steven Dietz
- "Private Eye", a 1949 short story by Lewis Padgett (Henry Kuttner and C. L. Moore)

== Music ==
- "Private Eye" (song), a 2001 song by Alkaline Trio
- "Private Eye", a song on the album Adultery by Dog Fashion Disco
- Private Eyes (Hall & Oates album), 1981
  - "Private Eyes" (song), the title song
- Private Eyes (Tommy Bolin album), 1976

== Other uses ==
- Private Eye (1984 video game), a game from Activision
- Private Eye (1996 video game), a game from Brooklyn Multimedia
- Private Eyes (nightclub), a former nightclub in New York City

== See also ==
- Privatize, to transfer ownership from the public to the private sector
