= The Long Goodbye (Climax!) =

- Climax! episode
- Episode no.: Season 1 Episode 1
- Directed by: William H. Brown Jr.
- Teleplay by: E. Jack Neuman
- Based on: The Long Goodbye by Raymond Chandler
- Presented by: William Lundigan
- Original air date: October 7, 1954

"The Long Goodbye" is a 1954 American television play based on the novel of the same name by Raymond Chandler. It was the first episode of the anthology series Climax! and starred Dick Powell as Philip Marlowe. Powell had played the role previously in Murder, My Sweet.

The episode was broadcast live. Although there was a rumor that actor Tristram Coffin, playing a corpse under a blanket, had got up and walked off the set in view of the live camera, he himself debunked this in an interview; while the blanket over his body was partially removed before he was out of frame, he did not walk off set in full view of the camera.

== Cast ==
- Dick Powell as Philip Marlowe
- Tom Drake as Terry Lennox
- Horace McMahon as Detective
- Cesar Romero as Mendy Mendez
- Teresa Wright as Eilene Wade
- Tris Coffin as dead body

== Reception ==
The New York Times called it "fine entertainment... a piece that held suspense". The Hollywood Reporter went even further, describing it as "beautifully acted and directed," while singling out both Neuman's adaptation and Brown's "imaginative and vigorous" direction and judging the fruit of their labor as superior to any big screen predecessor.

If this new teleseries lives up to its opener in future plays, it should become the number one hour-long dramatic show. [...] There have been several motion pictures based on Chandler's novels, and it must be said that none of them came off as well as this one did here.
