= Farewell, My Lovely (1975 film) =

1975 film by Dick Richards

- Theatrical release poster
- Directed by: Dick Richards
- Screenplay by: David Zelag Goodman
- Based on: Farewell, My Lovely (1940 novel) by Raymond Chandler
- Produced by: Jerry Bruckheimer; George Pappas
- Starring: Robert Mitchum; Charlotte Rampling; John Ireland; Sylvia Miles; Anthony Zerbe; Harry Dean Stanton; Jack O'Halloran
- Cinematography: John A. Alonzo
- Edited by: Joel Cox; Walter A. Thompson
- Music by: David Shire
- Production companies: ITC Entertainment; EK Corporation
- Distributed by: AVCO Embassy Pictures (U.S.); Fox-Rank Distributors (U.K.)
- Release dates: August 8, 1975 (U.S.); February 20, 1976 (U.K.)
- Running time: 95 minutes
- Country: United States; United Kingdom
- Language: English
- Budget: $2.5 million
- Box office: $2 million

Farewell, My Lovely is a 1975 neo-noir mystery film directed by Dick Richards from a screenplay by David Zelag Goodman, starring Robert Mitchum as Raymond Chandler's fictional private detective Philip Marlowe. The film is based on Chandler's 1940 novel Farewell, My Lovely, which had previously been adapted for film as Murder, My Sweet in 1944. The cast also features Charlotte Rampling, John Ireland, Sylvia Miles, Harry Dean Stanton, Joe Spinell, Sylvester Stallone, Jack O'Halloran in his film debut, and hardcore crime novelist Jim Thompson in his only acting role.

The film was produced by ITC Entertainment and released in the United States by AVCO Embassy Pictures on August 8, 1975. It received generally positive reviews from critics, and was commercially successful. Sylvia Miles was nominated for an Academy Award for Best Supporting Actress for her performance at the 48th Academy Awards.

Mitchum returned to the role of Marlowe three years later in the 1978 film The Big Sleep, making him the only actor to portray the character more than once in a feature film.

== Plot ==
In 1941 Los Angeles, private detective Philip Marlowe is hired by recently paroled felon "Moose" Malloy to find his old girlfriend Velma Valento, whom he has not seen in seven years while he has been in prison. Malloy goes to ground after killing the new owner of the nightclub where Velma used to work. Using a photo supplied by Velma's old nightclub friend Tommy Ray, Marlowe traces her to an insane asylum in Camarillo, but when he breaks the news to Malloy, he discovers that he had been given a photo of a different woman.

Meanwhile, a man named Lindsay Marriott hires Marlowe to accompany him to a rendezvous where he is to pay $15,000 ransom for the return of a valuable fei tsui jade necklace stolen from an unnamed female friend. At the location of the pay-off, Marlowe is knocked unconscious by an unseen assailant and when he recovers, the police are at the scene and Marriott has been killed. At the police station Marlowe is told that Malloy has fled to Mexico and is warned to stop looking for Velma.

Deciding to investigate Marriott's death, Marlowe is given a lead on a collector of fei tsui jade named Baxter Grayle, who is a judge and a powerful figure in Los Angeles. At Grayle's mansion he meets Grayle and his wife, the much younger and very seductive Helen. Helen wants to know who killed Marriott, whom she had known for years, and offers to pay Marlowe to find out. Marlowe is abducted at his office and brought to the brothel operated by Frances Amthor, a notorious madam. Amthor mentions Malloy, then beats and drugs Marlowe. After waking from his heroin-induced stupor and discovering the body of Tommy Ray, Marlowe overpowers the guard Cowboy and confronts Amthor, but she is uncooperative. Jonnie, an employee of Amthor, shoots her when she beats one of her girls for being with Jonnie. Marlowe flees (along with everyone else in the house) and makes it to his friend Georgie's house.

A few days later, Helen telephones Marlowe at his office and arranges to meet him at a party later that night. At the party, Marlowe talks to underworld figure Laird Brunette, who pays Marlowe $2,000 to arrange a meeting with Malloy. Later Marlowe meets Velma's old nightclub friend Jessie Florian, who says Velma has contacted her and wants to contact Malloy. Marlowe meets with Malloy at Georgie's house, where Velma telephones and arranges to meet him. Marlowe drives him to the motel where Velma is supposedly waiting. Instead, they are ambushed by two gunmen, whom Marlowe kills in a shootout.

Marlowe and the police find Jessie Florian murdered. Marlowe suggests to his police friend Nulty that whoever used Florian to set up Malloy at the motel also got Tommy Ray to supply the fake photograph to send him off on a wild goose chase. Marlowe is convinced that Brunette knows what is going on, so he and Malloy sneak aboard Brunette's gambling boat and confront him. Helen appears and it is revealed she is Velma, a former prostitute under Amthor, who married Baxter Grayle without his knowing about her background. Velma has been working with Brunette to kill off anyone who knows her real identity to protect Brunette's hold over Judge Grayle. In spite of Marlowe's warnings to Moose, Velma shoots Malloy and in turn Marlowe shoots her. As Nulty and the police arrive, Marlowe leaves and returns to his hotel room. He decides to give the $2,000 that he had received from Brunette to Tommy Ray's widow and young son, both of whom he had met earlier.

== Cast ==
- Robert Mitchum as Philip Marlowe
- Charlotte Rampling as Helen Grayle/Velma
- John Ireland as Lieutenant Nulty
- Sylvia Miles as Jessie Halstead Florian
- Anthony Zerbe as Laird Brunette
- Harry Dean Stanton as Detective Billy Rolfe
- Jack O'Halloran as "Moose" Malloy
- Joe Spinell as Nick
- Sylvester Stallone as Jonnie
- Kate Murtagh as Frances Amthor
- John O'Leary as Lindsay Marriott
- Walter McGinn as Tommy Ray
- Burton Gilliam as Cowboy
- Jim Thompson as Judge Baxter Wilson Grayle
- Jimmie Archer as Georgie
- Ted Gehring as Roy
- Logan Ramsey as Police Commissioner
- Jerry Fujikawa as Fence
- Rainbeaux Smith as Doris
- Little Caesar as Barman
- Joan Shawlee as Woman In Ballroom
- Eddra Gale as Singer

== Production ==
=== Development and writing ===
Producer Elliot Kastner had made a series of films based on detective novels, including Harper and The Long Goodbye. The latter was a Philip Marlowe novel by Raymond Chandler and Kastner was keen to film other Chandler novels. He had a script done which was set in contemporary Los Angeles and showed it to director Dick Richards. Richards was interested in filming the book, but only if it was a period piece.

Farewell, My Lovely had previously been adapted to film in 1944, as Murder, My Sweet.

Richards hired David Zelag Goodman to write the screenplay. They set the movie in 1941, so that they could stamp the film "with a time mark" by turning Marlowe into a baseball fan who followed Joe DiMaggio's hitting streak of that year. Richards originally considered shooting the film in Florida, but due to budgetary constraints the setting was returned to Los Angeles.

=== Finance ===
Sir Lew Grade had previously invested in Kastner's film Dogpound Shuffle. The producer approached him to invest in Farewell, My Lovely and Grade agreed, knowing the movie could be easily pre-sold to television. The movie would be part of Grade's initial slate of ten feature films, including The Return of the Pink Panther, Man Friday and The Tamarind Seed.

Robert Mitchum later recalled:

The producer, Elliott Kastner, comes by with Sir Lew Grade, the British tycoon. He has a black suit, a black tie, a white shirt and a whiter face. 'I know nothing about motion pictures,' Sir Lew says. 'What I know is entertainment: Ferris wheels, pony rides.' I suggested we buy up the rights to Murder, My Sweet with Dick Powell, re-release it and go to the beach. But, no, they hired a director, Dick Richards, so nervous he can't hold his legs still. They have all the hide rubbed off them. He started doing TV commercials. He was accustomed to, you know, start the camera, expose 120 feet of film and tell somebody to move the beer bottle half an inch clockwise. He does the same thing with people.

=== Casting ===
According to Mitchum, Kastner originally wanted the role of Philip Marlowe to be played by Richard Burton, with whom Kastner had worked a number of times. However, Burton was busy so they approached Mitchum. (Richards says he was only ever interested in doing the film with Mitchum.)

Marlowe's client Malloy is played by Jack O'Halloran, a former professional prizefighter, in his acting debut. Mitchum called O'Halloran "one great find on this picture. At least, he's a find if we can ever find him again... They hired him for $500 a week. He looked perfect for the part. One time he hit the producer. One of the producers. We had seven of them. We called them the Magnificent Seven. Jack was swinging this poor bastard around his head like an Indian war club. I tried to explain to him: 'The guy can be talked to, Jack.' He shakes his head. 'Mitch,' he says, 'I was crying too hard.'"

Mitchum said Charlotte Rampling "arrived with an odd entourage, two husbands or something. Or they were friends and she married one of them and he grew a mustache and butched up. She kept exercising her mouth like she was trying to swallow her ear. I played her on the right side because she had two great big blackheads on her left ear, and I was afraid they'd spring out and lodge on my lip."

The film features the sole acting role of crime novelist Jim Thompson, who appears as Judge Grayle.

=== Filming ===
Principal photography took place between February 23 and April 6, 1975, in various Los Angeles locations and at Samuel Goldwyn Studios.

Mitchum later admitted, "This kid Richards, the director, he's got something. It'll be a good picture."

== Music ==
=== Soundtrack ===
An original motion picture vinyl soundtrack album composed by David Shire was released in 1975 by United Artists Records. The album contained 11 tracks.

Track listing

1. "Main Title (Marlowe's Theme)"
2. "Velma / Chinese Pool Hall / To the Mansion"
3. "Mrs. Grayle's Theme"
4. "Amthor's Place"
5. "Mrs. Florian Takes the Full Count"
6. "Marlowe's Trip"
7. "Convalescence Montage"
8. "Take Me to Your Lido"
9. "Three Mile Limited"
10. "Moose Finds His Velma"
11. "End Title (Marlowe's Theme)"

== Reception ==
=== Box office ===
The film was profitable. Television rights were subsequently sold to NBC for $1.2 million.

=== Critical response ===
Critic Roger Ebert gave the film four out of four stars and wrote, "These opening shots are so evocative of Raymond Chandler's immortal Marlowe, archtypical [sic] private eye, haunting the underbelly of Los Angeles, that if we're Chandler fans we hold our breath. Is the ambience going to be maintained, or will this be another campy rip-off? Half an hour into the movie, we relax. Farewell, My Lovely never steps wrong...in the genre itself there hasn't been anything this good since Hollywood was doing Philip Marlowe the first time around. One reason is that Dick Richards, the director, takes his material and character absolutely seriously. He is not uneasy with it, as Robert Altman was when he had Elliott Gould flirt with seriousness in The Long Goodbye. Richards doesn't hedge his bet."

Gene Siskel gave the film three stars out of four and wrote that "if a remake of Farewell, My Lovely isn't something fresh — and following on the heels of Chinatown doesn't make it any fresher — at least the casting of Mitchum as Marlowe was inspired. Mitchum, the actor who makes nodding off seem glamorous, plays Marlowe with a delicious ease. He sounds just like Marlowe should sound."

A review in Variety was more critical, calling it "a lethargic, vaguely campy tribute to Hollywood's private eye mellers of the 1940s and to writer Raymond Chandler, whose Philip Marlowe character has inspired a number of features. Despite an impressive production and some first rate performances, this third version fails to generate much suspense or excitement."

Richard Eder of The New York Times described the film as "a handsome mediocrity" with an ending that "may produce some confusion," though he praised "the high quality of a lot of the acting".

Charles Champlin of the Los Angeles Times wrote that the score by David Shire and the casting of Mitchum as Marlowe both seemed "exactly right", but criticized the voice-over narrative, finding that "the effect undercuts the visual splendors and reveals the plot complications at their most preposterous. Too bad, because it breaks the fine mood Richards & Company establish and makes Farewell, My Lovely an interesting but mixed blessing instead of the unmitigated triumph it almost was."

In a retrospective review, critic Dennis Schwartz expressed that actor Robert Mitchum was well cast and wrote, "The film's success lies in Mitchum's hard-boiled portrayal of Marlowe, its twisty plot and the moody atmosphere it creates through John A. Alonzo's photography. Los Angeles looms as a nighttime playground for hoods, beautiful women and suckers ready to be taken by all the glitzy signs leading them astray."

The film maintains a 74% film rating on Rotten Tomatoes from 34 reviews. Metacritic, which uses a weighted average, assigned the film a score of 70 out of 100, based on 9 critics, indicating "generally favorable" reviews.

=== Accolades ===
Won

- National Board of Review: Top Ten Films; 1975.

Nomination

- Academy Awards: Best Actress in a Supporting Role, Sylvia Miles; 1976.
- Edgar Allan Poe Awards: Best Motion Picture, David Zelag Goodman; 1976.

== Sequel ==
Mitchum reprised his role for The Big Sleep, an adaptation of Chandler's 1939 novel, which premiered on 13 March 1978. Rather than a direct sequel, the film relocates Philip Marlowe to then-contemporary 1970s England. The film was written and directed by Michael Winner, with a cast featuring Sarah Miles (no relation to Sylvia Miles), Richard Boone, Candy Clark, Joan Collins, Edward Fox, Oliver Reed, and James Stewart in one of his last feature film roles.

== Other adaptations ==
See: Farewell, My Lovely -- Film adaptations

The novel had been adapted for the screen twice before: in 1942, as The Falcon Takes Over directed by Irving Reis and featuring George Sanders as The Falcon in place of Philip Marlowe; and in 1944, as Murder, My Sweet, featuring Dick Powell as Marlowe and directed by Edward Dmytryk.

Mitchum played Marlowe again in 1978's The Big Sleep, becoming the only actor to play the character in two feature films. Instead of 1930s Los Angeles, the 1978 remake was set in then-present day and in England, with Marlowe reimagined as a middle-aged ex-pat. Grade financed this movie as well.

Actors who played Marlowe in earlier movies include Dick Powell (1944), Humphrey Bogart (1946), Robert Montgomery (1947), George Montgomery (1947), James Garner (1969) and Elliott Gould (1973). After this 1975 film came Poodle Springs, a 1998 neo-noir HBO period film directed by Bob Rafelson, starring James Caan as Marlowe. In 2022, Liam Neeson played the role in Marlowe.
