= Poodle Springs =

1989 novel by Raymond Chandler

- Cover of the first edition
- Author: Raymond Chandler and Robert B. Parker
- Language: English
- Series: Philip Marlowe
- Genre: Crime fiction
- Publisher: G. P. Putnam's Sons
- Publication date: October 1989
- Publication place: United States
- Media type: Print (hardcover, 1989, and paperback, 1990)
- Pages: 290 (paperback edition)
- ISBN: 0-425-12343-X (pb)
- OCLC: 22651781
- Preceded by: Playback

Poodle Springs is the eighth Philip Marlowe novel. It was started in 1958 by Raymond Chandler, who left it unfinished at his death in 1959. The four chapters he had completed, which bore the working title The Poodle Springs Story, were subsequently published in Raymond Chandler Speaking (1962), a collection of excerpts from letters and unpublished writings. In 1988, on the occasion of the centenary of Chandler's birth, the crime writer Robert B. Parker was asked by the estate of Raymond Chandler to complete the novel.

== Plot summary ==
Marlowe has married Linda Loring, the rich daughter of local tycoon Harlan Potter. Linda and Marlowe first met in The Long Goodbye and their romance is resumed at the end of Playback. Marlowe resists financial dependence on his willing wife and, after the couple relocate to a grand mansion in Poodle Springs (a mocking reference to Palm Springs), opens a detective agency in the resort. Tension between them rises when, as a result, Marlowe absents himself from the cocktail parties and other social events organised by Linda’s set.

Marlowe’s first case comes when he is forced by hoodlums to visit a local criminal named Lipschultz, who operates an illegal gambling house in Riverside, just outside the jurisdiction of Poodle Springs. He has taken an IOU for $100,000 from one of his customers, a Poodle Springs photographer called Les Valentine. Lipshultz's boss, an unrevealed local tycoon, has found out that the sum is missing from the books and has issued a 30-day ultimatum to retrieve the money. Asked to find Valentine, Marlowe accepts on condition that he does not have to shake Valentine down.

When Marlowe questions Valentine's wife, Muffy Blackstone, a spoiled socialite and acquaintance of his own wife, she tells him that Valentine is out on a photo shoot. Instead he eventually discovers that Valentine is an alias for a sleazy individual living in Los Angeles with a second wife. When Marlowe calls on Lipshultz again, he finds him killed in his casino office and assists Valentine to escape after he is suspected, not just for this crime but for an earlier slaying in his own office. The melodramatic pay-off exposes the corruption of the Southern Californian rich and confirms Marlowe in his decision to return to Los Angeles. His marriage is wrecked, but he and Linda remain as lovers.

== Contributions ==
Chandler's first four chapters of the story are used complete and unabridged in this edition. These opening chapters describe the Marlowes' arrival in Poodle Springs fresh from their honeymoon, the large bungalow they live in and Marlowe's insistence on independence, and they introduce the principal characters (Philip Marlowe, Linda Loring and Manny Lipshultz) and several supporting characters.

Parker wrote the other chapters. In 1991 Parker followed this novel with a new novel featuring Marlowe, Perchance to Dream, a sequel to Chandler's The Big Sleep.

== In other media ==
The novel was adapted for a film of the same title by the cable channel HBO in 1998, starring James Caan as Marlowe. An adaptation for BBC Radio 4 was broadcast in October 2011, starring Toby Stephens as Marlowe.

== Bibliography ==
- Wild, Peter (2011). Paradise of Desire: Eleven Palm Springs Novels. Tucson, AZ: Estate of Peter Wild. p. 281. OCLC 748584112.
