= Perchance to Dream (novel) =

Novel by Robert B. Parker

- First edition Hardcover (1991)
- Author: Robert B. Parker
- Language: English
- Series: Philip Marlowe
- Genre: Detective, Crime novel
- Publisher: Putnam Adult
- Publication date: 10 January 1991 (1st edition)
- Publication place: United States
- Media type: Print (Hardcover)
- Pages: 271 pp. (1st edition)
- ISBN: 978-0-399-13580-4
- Preceded by: The Big Sleep

Perchance to Dream is a detective crime novel by Robert B. Parker, written as an authorized sequel to The Big Sleep by Raymond Chandler. Following his posthumous collaboration with Chandler on Poodle Springs, this 1991 release is the second and final Philip Marlowe novel written by Parker.

== Plot ==
Set a few years after the events of The Big Sleep, Perchance to Dream begins with long passages of text lifted from the original to set the scene, establish the characters, and remind readers of the events of the first book. The story is set in motion by the death of family patriarch General Sternwood. Marlowe is called to the Sternwood mansion in the hills of Los Angeles by Norris, the butler. He finds older daughter Vivian still in residence and still dating gangster Eddie Mars but her younger sister Carmen, still tormented by the events of the original story, has been sent off to live at Resthaven, a luxurious psychiatric rehabilitation facility. When Carmen disappears from the rest home, Norris hires Marlowe to find her.

== Development history ==
The estate of Raymond Chandler was satisfied with Parker's completion of Poodle Springs, a Philip Marlowe novel begun in 1958 by Chandler but finished by Parker for publication in 1989. They authorized him to write this entirely new sequel to the first Marlowe novel, The Big Sleep, originally published in 1939. Parker, a longtime fan and student of Chandler's writing, said he took the assignment because "I wanted to see if I could do it". After the publication of Perchance to Dream, Parker announced that this would be his final Marlowe novel because he did not "want to spend [his] life writing some other guy's books".

=== Publication history ===
- 1991, USA, Putnam Adult, ISBN 978-0-399-13580-4, Pub date 10 January 1991, Hardback
- 1991, UK, Little, Brown, ISBN 0-356-20167-8, Pub date March 1991, Hardback
- 1991, USA, Thorndike Press, ISBN 978-1-56054-977-2, Pub date June 1991, Large Print Paperback
- 1993, USA, Berkley Books, ISBN 978-0-425-13131-2, Pub date 1 December 1993, Paperback

=== Explanation of the novel's title ===
Perchance to Dream is written as a direct sequel to The Big Sleep, the title of which is a euphemism for death. (The older novel includes a philosophical reflection on "sleeping the big sleep".) Continuing the play on words, the sequel derives its name from famous lines from Prince Hamlet's soliloquy in Hamlet, a tragedy by William Shakespeare: "to die: to sleep— / To sleep, perchance to dream" (Act 3, Scene 1, Lines 63–64). One reviewer snarkily suggested alternate titles including Maybe to Dream, The Bigger Sleep, and Sleep Bigger.

== Literary significance and reception ==
Reviewing the novel for The New York Times, author Martin Amis wrote that it "never amounts to more than a nostalgic curiosity" while finding the text "candidly puerile" and "full of stubbed toes and barked shins". Josh Rubins of Entertainment Weekly allowed that "Parker has no trouble telling a story in the spare, coolly sardonic Chandler/Marlowe voice" but found Parker's Marlowe to be "a bit of a lightweight" and that "the tale Parker has concocted for this sequel doesn't seem worthy of the occasion". Writing in the Los Angeles Times, Dick Lochte asserted that Parker "was no Chandler" but found the novel "entertaining" in its own right. Author Robert Goldsborough reviewed the novel more positively for the Chicago Tribune, finding this book to be better than Poodle Springs and that Parker has "crafted a Marlowe tale stronger than most of Chandler's later work."

== Adaptations ==
The first audiobook release of Perchance to Dream was on cassette tape in January 1991 (ISBN 978-1558002913) from Dove Entertainment, Inc. Phoenix Books released a new audio book production of the novel on compact disc in February 2007. This edition (ISBN 978-1597770255) was read by actor Elliott Gould who played the character of Marlowe in the 1973 film The Long Goodbye.
