= Security Trust and Savings (Hollywood) =

Building in Los Angeles, California

- U.S. National Register of Historic Places
- U.S. Historic district – Contributing property
- Los Angeles Historic-Cultural Monument
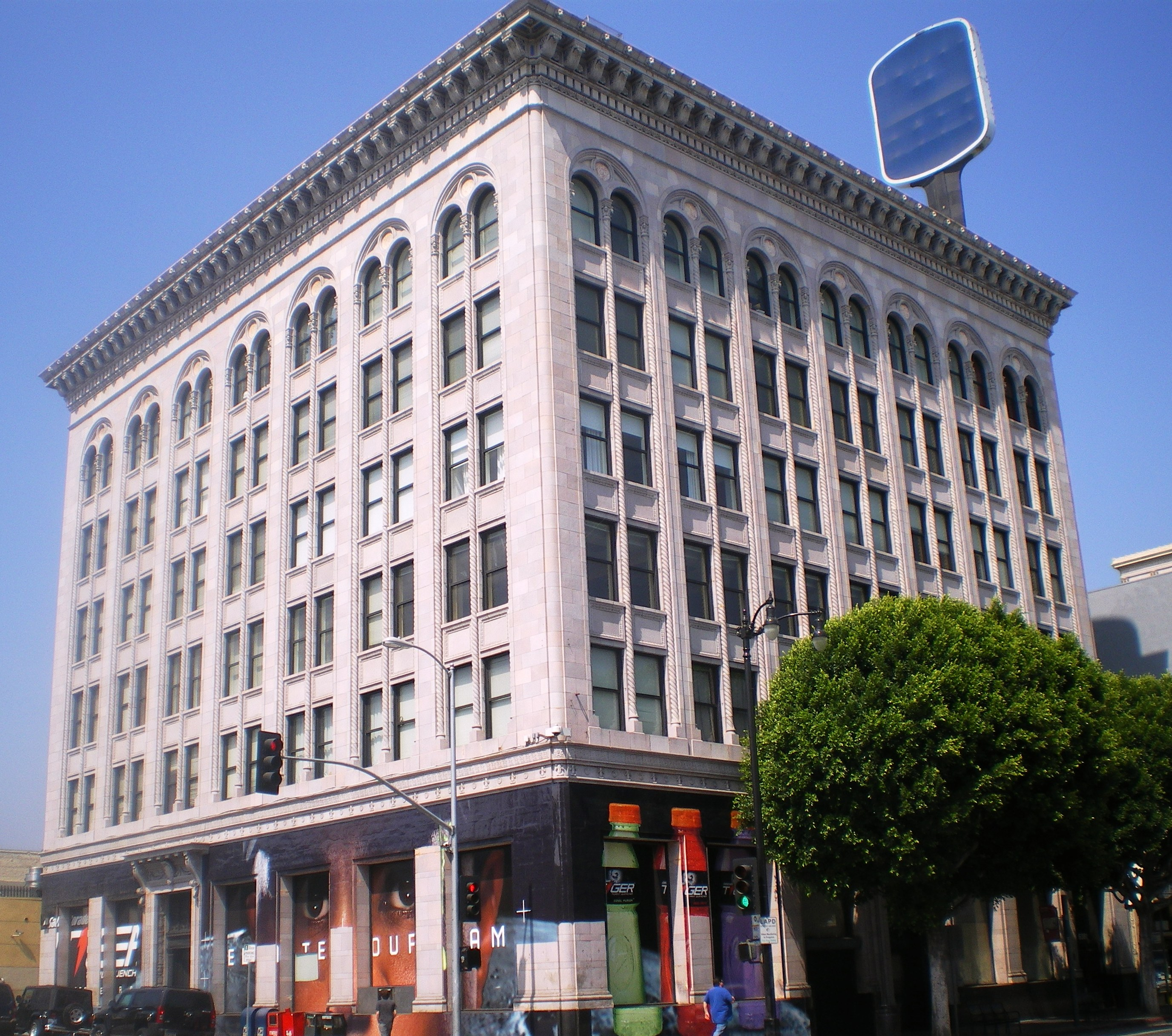
- Security Trust and Savings, 2008

- Location within the Los Angeles metropolitan area
- Location: 6381–6385 W. Hollywood Blvd., Los Angeles, California
- Coordinates: 34°06′07″N 118°19′45″W
- Built: 1921
- Architect: John and Donald Parkinson
- Architectural style: Italian Renaissance revival
- Part of: Hollywood Boulevard Commercial and Entertainment District (ID85000704)
- NRHP reference No.: 83001204
- LAHCM No.: 334

Significant dates
- Designated NRHP: August 18, 1983
- Designated CP: April 4, 1985
- Designated LAHCM: December 18, 1987

Security Trust and Savings, also known as Security Trust, Security Pacific Bank, Security Bank Building, and Cahuenga Building, is a historic seven-story office building on the corner of Hollywood Boulevard and Cahuenga Boulevard in Hollywood, California. It is notable for its architecture, its history with Hollywood, and its association with fictional detective Philip Marlowe.

== History ==
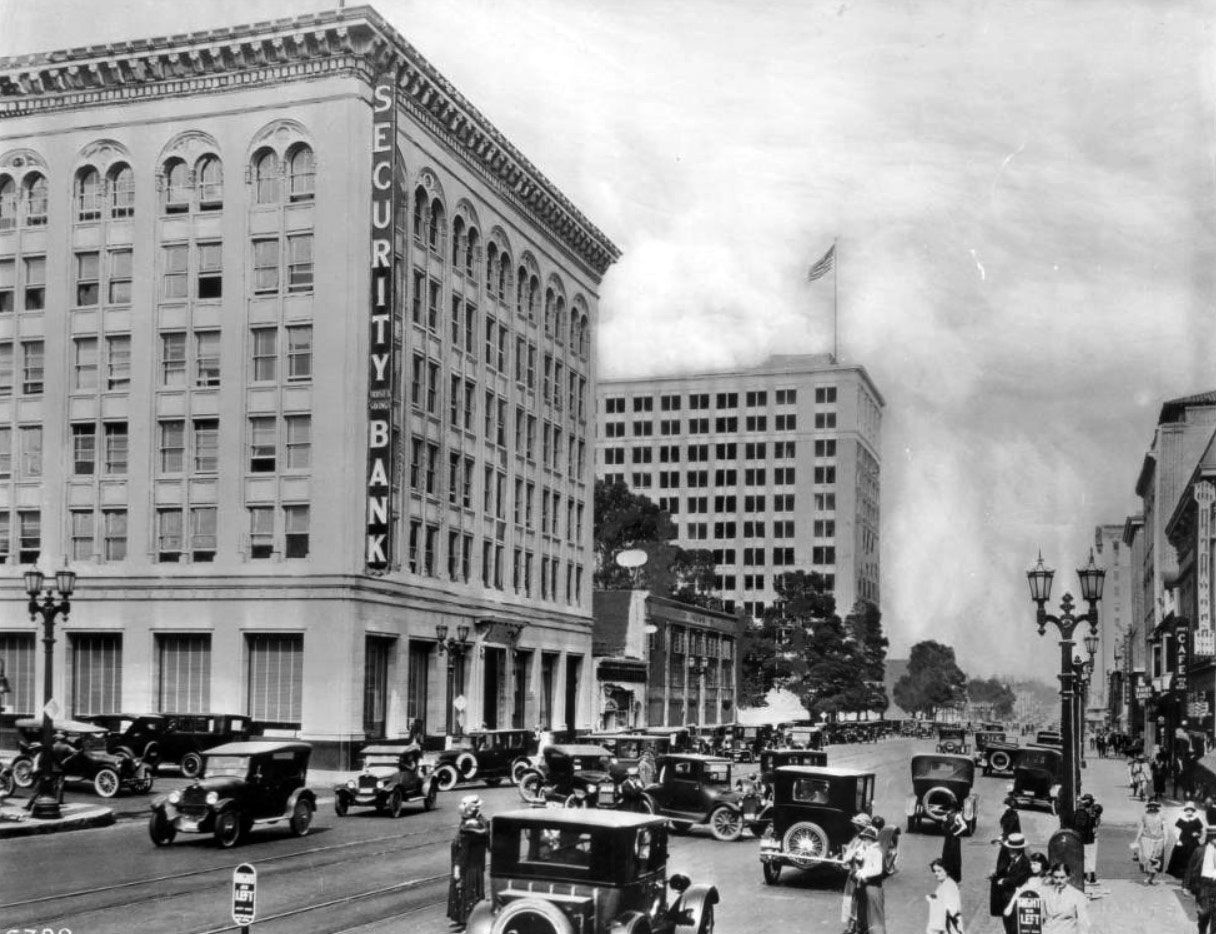
Security Trust and Savings on Hollywood Boulevard in 1927

Security Trust and Savings, a major California bank, purchased the site at the intersection of Hollywood and Cahuenga in 1920, and John and Donald Parkinson completed plans for the building later that year. The structure, Security Trust and Savings' Hollywood branch, was completed in 1921 and upon opening was the tallest building in Hollywood. The branch was "a power center of the entertainment industry", with clients that included Charlie Chaplin, the Three Stooges, Lana Turner, W.C. Fields, Cecil B. DeMille, Howard Hughes, and more.

In 1982, the building was included in the National Register of Historic Places, and in 1985, the Hollywood Boulevard Commercial and Entertainment District was added to the register, with Security Trust listed as a contributing property in the district. In 1987, the building was designated Los Angeles Historic-Cultural Monument No. 334.

In 2008, Hollywood's Economic Development Committee received two proposals to convert the building into a hotel, and in 2020, the building was bought for $53 million ($65.9 million in 2025) by Onni Group, who plan to preserve it while redeveloping an adjoining property.

== Architecture and design ==
Security Trust and Savings is a steel reinforced masonry office building that features an Italian Renaissance Revival design. It was designed by John and Donald Parkinson, who also designed some of the Los Angeles's most notable landmarks, including Union Station and the Memorial Coliseum. The building features vertical massing with a grey terra cotta exterior, additional terra cotta ornamentation, and a dark marble band that anchors the building to the street.

The street level facade features slightly recessed and outsized windows between wide pilasters, and recessed entryways highlighted by fluted columns. The Cahuenga entrance also features an ornately decorated cornice with medallions and garlands supported by brackets, while the Hollywood Boulevard entrance was stripped of its cornice to accommodate a sign. An ornamental stringcourse separates the street level from the office floors above, with the office floors featuring pairs of slightly recessed vertically banded windows separated by thin twisted fluted columns and culminating decorative capitals and a double arch. Beneath each office window is a rectangular panel bordered with terra cotta cast in a classical motif.

A flat roof with deep projecting eaves caps the structure. Cornice decorations, including sculpted lion heads and carved brackets featuring recessed floral medallions, punctuate the roof line. The "rope" effect of the twisted columns is maintained in this area by two horizontal bands, and the classical motif of the office window panels is repeated in a horizontal band below the brackets.

The interior bank lobby features original marble floors and freestanding covered columns as well as restored banded marble walls and high ceilings. Much of the rest of the interior has been renovated and remodeled.

== In popular culture ==
This building is widely believed to be the inspiration for the Cahuenga Building, a fictional building that housed the office of Philip Marlowe, the hardboiled detective featured in a number of Raymond Chandler's stories. Additionally, The Brasher Doubloon, a film adaption of Chandler's The High Window, features this building as that location. The intersection outside this building was named Raymond Chandler Square as a tribute to the belief that Philip Marlowe's office was located here. In 1994, the Square was designated Los Angeles Historic Cultural Monument No. 597.

This building's exterior was a common filming location for and can be seen in many Buster Keaton, Harold Lloyd, and Charlie Chaplin films.

== See also ==
- List of Los Angeles Historic-Cultural Monuments in Hollywood
- List of contributing properties in the Hollywood Boulevard Commercial and Entertainment District
