= Poodle Springs (film) =

1998 television film directed by Bob Rafelson

- Genre: Crime; Drama
- Based on: Poodle Springs by Raymond Chandler; Robert B. Parker
- Screenplay by: Tom Stoppard
- Directed by: Bob Rafelson
- Starring: James Caan; Dina Meyer; David Keith
- Music by: Michael Small
- Country of origin: United States
- Original language: English

Production
- Executive producers: Jon Avnet; William Horberg; Jordan Kerner; Sydney Pollack
- Producer: Tony Mark
- Cinematography: Stuart Dryburgh
- Editor: Steven Cohen
- Running time: 100 minutes
- Production companies: Avnet/Kerner Productions; Mirage Enterprises; HBO Pictures; Universal Television

Original release
- Network: HBO
- Release: July 25, 1998

Poodle Springs is a 1998 neo-noir HBO film directed by Bob Rafelson, starring James Caan as private detective Philip Marlowe.

The film is based on the unfinished novel Poodle Springs by Raymond Chandler, completed after his death by Robert B. Parker and published in 1989. Playwright Tom Stoppard wrote the screenplay.

== Plot ==
In 1963, aging Philip Marlowe is newly married to younger socialite Laura Parker. The private investigator has left his Los Angeles apartment behind and goes to live with his wife in Poodle Springs (a parody of Palm Springs), an upscale community in the desert a couple hours from L.A., where he and his wife intend to live. Seemingly crime-free Poodle Springs is the cultural opposite of Los Angeles, and the detective consistently explains to potential clients "I don't do divorces," after he sets up an office in a low-rent neighborhood. Everyone in the community knows the detective is married to money, and his rich wife Laura would prefer that he get out of private investigations and live off her money or come into business with her politically-connected father P.J. Parker, and the subject is a recurring contentious issue between the newlyweds. Marlowe isn't ready to give up the gumshoe occupation, and his determined independence becomes a more insurmountable obstacle at every juncture.

The film opens with Marlowe in his L.A. office when his beautiful young rich wife Laura enters to invite him to an afternoon liaison when the phone rings and a man summons him to meet. Before he can get more information, shots are heard through the phone, and the line goes dead. Marlowe calls Arnie Burns his detective friend at the police department and the two meet at the scene of the crime to discover a man in his car shot through the head. Marlowe sees the name ‘Larry Victor’ in the dead man’s notes and is arrested, motivating Laura to leverage her wealthy legal connections to have him released. Arnie Burns shows Marlowe photos of a woman from the dead man’s camera, but he doesn’t recognize her.

While looking into a matter at a gambling club for a man name Lipschultz just beyond the city limits, Marlowe is hired to find a photographer called Les Valentine with a gambling debt and is soon mixed up in blackmail and murder. The detective discovers that Les Valentine is also Larry Victor, a photographer, and bigamist, two-timing Laura's wealthy friend Muffy Blackstone with wife Angel, and he is threatening to expose photos of a former stripper who is now running with Muffy's billionaire father, Clayton Blackstone.

The dead man Marlowe first discovered is Paul Krause, a detective blackmailing Angel and Larry. It is later revealed that Angel shot Krause and Larry Victor phoned Marlowe to frame him. As Marlowe investigates further, he discovers that his new father-in-law P.J. Parker is involved in a land swindle with Clayton Blackstone on a massive scale affecting the California/Nevada state border. When Linda tells Marlowe their marriage isn’t working, they agree to part, but dissolving their partnership on paper does not end their affection for each other and they agree to part and remain friends with benefits.

== Cast ==
- James Caan as Philip Marlowe
- Dina Meyer as Laura Parker-Marlowe
- David Keith as Larry Victor / Charles Nichols
- Joe Don Baker as P.J. Parker
- Tom Bower as Lieutenant Arnie Burns
- Julia Campbell as Miriam "Muffy" Blackstone-Nichols
- Brian Cox as Clayton Blackstone
- Nia Peeples as Angel
- Mo Gallini as J.D.
