= The Long Goodbye (novel) =

1953 novel by Raymond Chandler

The Long Good-bye
- Cover of the first British edition
- Author: Raymond Chandler
- Language: English
- Series: Philip Marlowe
- Genre: Detective fiction
- Publisher: Hamish Hamilton (UK); Houghton Mifflin (US)
- Publication date: 1953
- Media type: Print (hardcover)
- Pages: 320 pp
- Preceded by: The Little Sister
- Followed by: Playback
- Text: The Long Good-bye online

The Long Good-bye is a novel by Raymond Chandler, published in 1953, his sixth novel featuring the private investigator Philip Marlowe. Some critics consider it inferior to The Big Sleep or Farewell, My Lovely, but others rank it with the finest of his or any other detective writer's work. Chandler, in a letter to a friend, called the novel "my best book".

The novel is notable for using hard-boiled detective fiction as a vehicle for social criticism and for including autobiographical elements from Chandler's life. In 1955, the work received the Edgar Award for Best Novel. It was later adapted as a 1973 film of the same name, updated to 1970s Los Angeles and starring Elliott Gould.

== Composition and publication ==
Chandler began work on the novel in 1951, at the time being titled Summer in Idle Valley after the fictional location in the Los Angeles area where much of it takes place. It was unusually long for a detective story. During 1952, Chandler sent a draft of it to his literary agency, Brandt and Brandt, and was dismayed by their criticism of the "softness" of Marlowe's character; he began marking large-scale changes to the manuscript and later that year dropped the agency. Ultimately coming in at over 125,000 words in length, work on the novel was completed in July 1953.

The Long Goodbye was first published in Great Britain, by Hamish Hamilton in November 1953; this was followed by publication in the United States by Houghton Mifflin in March 1954 (there were no differences between the editions other than spellings). It generally received favorable reviews at the time: Charles Poore said it "may well be hailed as the old master's masterpiece", while the critic Anthony Boucher assessed it as "a moody, brooding book, in which Marlowe is less a detective than a disturbed man of 42 on a quest for some evidence of truth and humanity." The book did not appear on the New York Times best-seller list.

== Plot summary ==
Outside of "the Dancers," a club in Los Angeles, private detective Philip Marlowe meets Terry Lennox, a drunk with scars on one side of his face. They forge an uneasy friendship over the next few months, having drinks, especially gimlets, together at bars. In June, Lennox shows up late one night at Marlowe's home in "a great deal of trouble" and needing a ride to the airport across the border in Tijuana. Marlowe agrees as long as Lennox does not tell him any details of why he is running. He later finds five $100 bills left to him by Terry.

On his return to Los Angeles, Marlowe learns that Lennox's wife Sylvia was found dead; she had died before Lennox fled. Marlowe is arrested for aiding a suspected murderer after refusing to cooperate with police detectives, who want him to confess he helped Lennox flee. Sylvia's murder was particularly violent, and Marlowe cannot believe that the man he had befriended would have done that. After three days of antagonizing his interrogators, Marlowe is released, the police explaining that Lennox has been reported to have committed suicide in a small Mexican town with a written confession by his side. Marlowe gets home to find a cryptic letter from Lennox containing a "portrait of Madison" (a $5,000 bill).

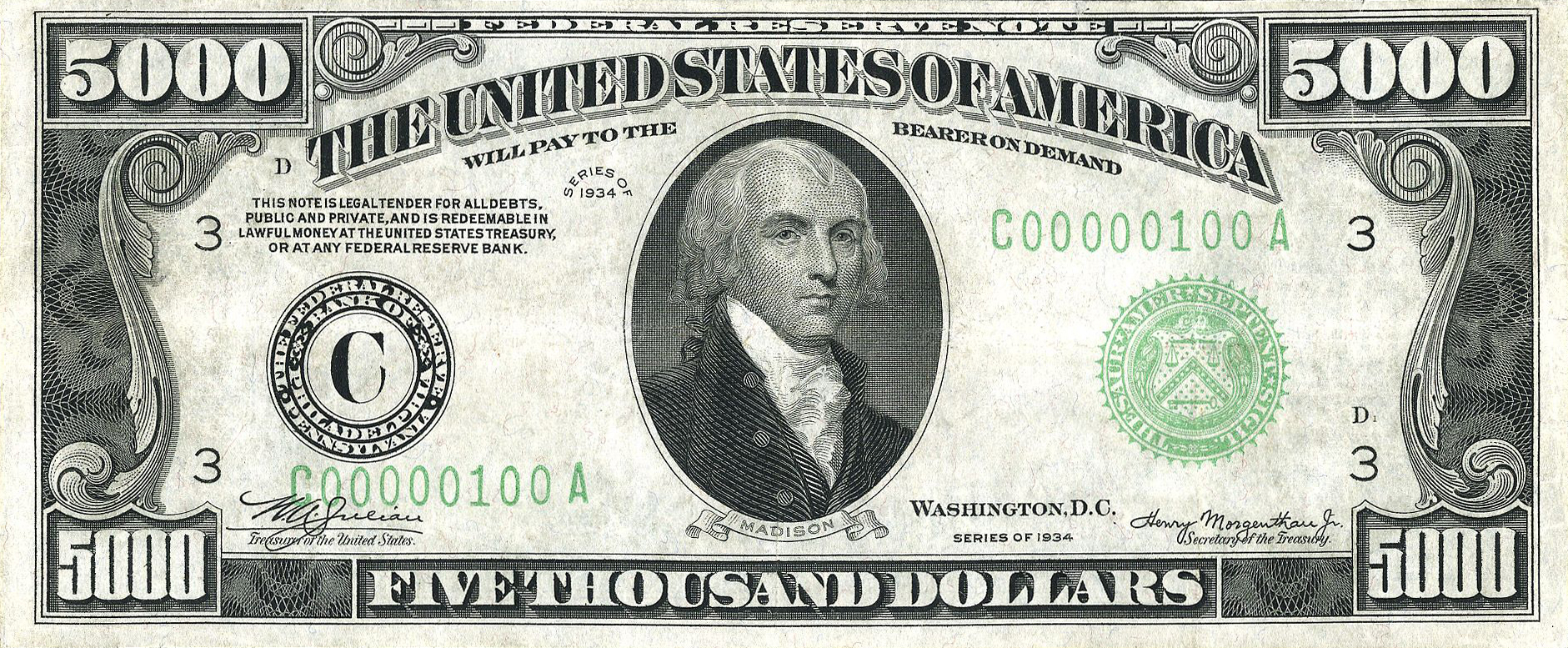
A "portrait of Madison"

Marlowe gets a call from New York publisher Howard Spencer, who asks him to investigate a case. One of Spencer's best writers, Roger Wade, has a drinking problem and has been missing for three days. Marlowe initially refuses, but after Wade's wife, Eileen, also asks for Marlowe's help, he consents. Marlowe finds Wade in a makeshift detox facility in an isolated and soon-to-be-abandoned ranch. He takes his fee, but the Wades' stories do not match.

The Wades each try to persuade Marlowe to stay at their house to keep Roger writing instead of drinking. Despite refusing, he makes further trips to the house at their behest. Marlowe is invited to an awkward cocktail party, where Dr. Edward Loring threatens Wade, telling him to leave his wife Linda alone. Marlowe accidentally met Mrs. Loring previously at a bar, where they were drinking gimlets together in memory of Lennox. Linda Loring is actually Sylvia Lennox's sister, and knew Terry well.

After being called by a drunk and disoriented Roger, Marlowe arrives to find Wade passed out in the grass with a cut on his head and Mrs. Wade oddly uninterested in her husband's welfare. He is put to bed with a head wound from a likely fall. Dr. Loring is called and examines Wade, not hiding his contempt. Wade wakes up and begs Marlowe to remove and destroy typewritten pages in his study he wrote while drunk, not wanting his wife to read them.

Marlowe reads the pages, finding a cryptic self-analysis by Wade which hints at repressed trauma he does not quite understand alongside a clear statement that "once a good man died" for him. Marlowe keeps this evidence. Hearing a shot, he rushes to find the couple struggling over a gun in Roger's bedroom. Marlowe sits with Roger until the latter has taken sleeping pills. As he is leaving, a distraught half-naked Eileen enters a sort of trance and attempts to seduce Marlowe, apparently thinking him to be a former lover who died in the Second World War. Marlowe refuses and crashes on their couch, getting drunk and passing out to not be tempted by Eileen. The Wades' houseboy, Candy, makes threats against Marlowe. The next morning, Eileen behaves normally and Marlowe leaves.

Marlowe is repeatedly threatened and told to cease his investigation of the Lennox case, first by a gangster friend of Lennox's named Mendy Menendez, then by Lennox's wealthy father-in-law Harlan Potter, by his old friend Bernie Ohls from the LAPD, by Candy and by Mrs. Wade. Through his own hunches and inquiries, Marlowe learns that Terry Lennox had previously lived as Paul Marston, who had married and spent some time in England.

Roger calls Marlowe again, inviting him to the Wades' for lunch. After indulging in self-pity over his writing difficulties, he posits that he is an alcoholic because he is trying to find answers to the trauma in his past, offers Marlowe a check of $1,000, then proceeds to drink himself into a stupor. Marlowe asks him if he ever knew someone named Paul Marston, and with an effort Roger says no. Marlowe takes a walk outside. When he returns, Eileen is ringing the doorbell, having forgotten her key. Marlowe finds Roger dead on the couch, apparently from suicide, but Eileen accuses Marlowe of killing him. Candy fabricates a story of Marlowe sleeping with Mrs. Wade to implicate Marlowe, believing him to be guilty, but his claims are undermined in an interrogation. The police do not hold Marlowe.

Marlowe receives a call from Spencer regarding Wade's death and bullies Spencer into accompanying him to see Mrs. Wade. Once there, with Spencer as witness, Marlowe grills her on the death of Sylvia Lennox. Eileen first tries to blame it all on Roger but Marlowe pokes holes in her story, arguing that she killed both Mrs. Lennox and Roger Wade and that Lennox was her first husband, presumed killed while serving with the British Commandos in Norway during the war. (It transpires that Marlowe is correct: Lennox was indeed Paul Marston, who was in fact not killed in Norway but, in spite of brutal maltreatment by his German captors, had survived; not realising that he was still alive, his wife Eileen had remarried: hence both their despair, and Roger Wade's torment.) Eileen flees to her room, but Marlowe convinces Spencer not to call the police. The next morning, Marlowe learns that she has killed herself by overdosing on painkillers, leaving a note describing the affair Mrs. Lennox was having with her husband and confessing to killing them both in a jealous rage.

Marlowe refuses to let the story lie, and when the authorities decide to forgo an inquest because it will show them up, he steals a duplicate photostat of Eileen's confession from the police. Marlowe contacts a reporter he knows in order to make sure the confession is printed, even though the reporter warns him that he'll make numerous enemies by doing so. Marlowe replies that he has been trying to say goodbye to Terry Lennox for "a long, long time." A few days later Marlowe is assaulted by Menendez, who is then arrested by Ohls in a setup. Ohls explains that Marlowe was intentionally left in a position to take the photostat because the police wanted to trap Menendez in a felony, and Ohls knew that Marlowe's scruples and stubbornness would lead him to do the best he could to clear Lennox's name.

Mrs. Linda Loring has called Marlowe previously, informing him that she is getting a divorce from her husband Dr. Loring, who has written prescriptions for massive doses of Demerol to the late Mrs. Wade, allowing her to overdose. Linda pays a visit to Marlowe's house with an overnight bag, and they drink champagne together. She stays for the night and even proposes marriage to Marlowe. In the morning they part amicably, Linda leaving for Paris.

Later, Marlowe is visited by a Mexican man who claims to have been present when Lennox was killed in his hotel room. Marlowe listens to his story but rejects it and offers his own version, ending with the revelation the Mexican man is none other than Lennox himself, who has had cosmetic surgery after his elaborately faked suicide. Lennox attempts to make amends for the trouble he has caused Marlowe but is rebuffed. While Marlowe claims that he doesn't judge him for what he did, he returns the $5,000 bill and says Lennox is "not here anymore." Lennox is hurt by this and leaves after saying goodbye. The novel ends with Marlowe listening to Lennox leave and faintly hoping he might return but instead explaining that he never saw him again.

== Thematic background ==
The Long Good-bye is Chandler's most personal novel. He wrote it as his wife Cissie was dying. Her long illness and death had a profound effect on him, driving him into fits of melancholy and leading him to talk of and even to attempt suicide. Two characters in the novel are based on Chandler; both of them highlight Chandler's awareness of his own flaws—his alcoholism and his doubts about the value of his writing.

The character most clearly based on Chandler is the usually drunken writer Roger Wade. Like Chandler, Wade had a string of successful novels behind him, but as he grew older he found it more difficult to write. Also, like Chandler, Wade had written novels (romantic fiction) that were viewed by many as not real literature, whereas Wade wants to be thought of as a serious author. Wade also stands in for Chandler in discussions about literature, as in his praise of F. Scott Fitzgerald and some rather more sceptical remarks about T S Eliot.

The other Chandler stand-in is Terry Lennox. Like Chandler, Lennox is an alcoholic. Also like Chandler, he had fought in a war which left emotional scars. For Lennox, it was the Second World War; for Chandler, it was the First. Lennox is a Canadian citizen but he had spent a great deal of time in England and retained the restrained and formal attitude of an English gentleman. This made him somewhat of an anomaly in the fast-paced and more informal world of wealthy Los Angeles, which he inhabited because of his wife's money.

Chandler was also raised in England and received a classical education there. Chandler also retained a great love for the English and what he viewed as their more civilised way of life compared with the shallowness and superficiality of Los Angeles. This frequently put him at odds with screenwriting collaborators, such as Billy Wilder, and with most of Los Angeles and Hollywood society.

== Film, television, and radio adaptations ==
This novel was dramatized for television in 1954 for the anthology series Climax!, with Dick Powell playing Marlowe, as he had a decade earlier in the film Murder, My Sweet. The episode, which was broadcast live, was known for supposedly containing a scene where actor Tris Coffin, who was playing a corpse in a morgue, got up off a stretcher in full view of the camera. However, in a later interview, Coffin debunked this as a rumor; while the blanket over his body was partially removed before he was out of frame, he did not walk off set in full view of the camera.

In 1973, Robert Altman filmed a very free adaptation set in contemporary Los Angeles, with Elliott Gould as Marlowe.

An adaptation of the novel was broadcast by BBC Radio 4 on 16 January 1978, with Ed Bishop as Marlowe, and again on 1 October 2011, with Toby Stephens as Marlowe as part of its Classic Chandler series. Japanese broadcaster NHK aired five episodes of a Japanese adaptation of the novel in 2014.

== Appearances in other works ==
The Long Good-bye has been referred to in other works of fiction. Greg Iles referred to Chandler and the novel's title in his own novel The Quiet Game, in which one character is named Marston. It has been featured in the Japanese tokusatsu drama Kamen Rider W, in which the main character constantly reads from a Japanese version of the book. Also, the character of Marlowe is directly referenced as the inspiration behind the name of the character, Philip. Michael Connelly refers to the novel's title and quotes from it in his own novel The Black Ice. There are flashbacks to the events in this novel in the homage Marlowe novel The Black-Eyed Blonde.

The sixteenth episode in Season 2 'Stargate: Atlantis' is "The Long Goodbye", an homage to Chandler's novel.

The novel's title has been alluded to in the titles of other works of fiction with a hardboiled, noir, detective or gangster theme, including the British gangster film The Long Good Friday (1980), an episode of Star Trek: The Next Generation entitled "The Big Goodbye" (1988), and Frank Miller's graphic novel The Hard Goodbye (1991–92), the first volume in the Sin City series.

In music, crime novelist Matt Rees's band Poisonville, which is named after the fictitious location of the Dashiell Hammett novel Red Harvest, released a song about The Long Goodbye on its first album. Rees described the novel as "a creepier book than people think."

The 1973 novel Triste, Solitario y Final by Argentine writer Osvaldo Soriano refers to the final words of Phillip Marlowe to Terry Lennox: "I won't say goodbye. I said it to you when it meant something. I said it when it was sad and lonely and final".

A reference to The Long Goodbye appears in The Midnight Train by Matt Haig. The mention has been noted as an example of literary allusion, drawing a connection to themes commonly associated with Raymond Chandler’s novel, including departure, identity, and emotional distance. The reference situates The Midnight Train within a broader literary context and has been interpreted as reflecting overlapping thematic concerns between the two works

Awards
Preceded by Beat Not the Bones by Charlotte Jay	Edgar Allan Poe Award for Best Novel; 1955	Succeeded by Beast in View by Margaret Millar
