= Raymond Chandler Speaking =

Book by Raymond Chandler

Raymond Chandler speaking
- First edition (UK)
- Author: Raymond Chandler; edited by Dorothy Gardiner and Kathrine Sorley Walker
- Language: English
- Genre: Literary criticism
- Publisher: Hamish Hamilton (UK); Houghton Mifflin (US)
- Publication date: 1962
- Publication place: United States
- Media type: Print
- Pages: 272
- OCLC: 35192346
- Dewey Decimal: 813/.52 B 20
- LC Class: PS3505.H3224 Z47 1997

Raymond Chandler Speaking is a collection of excerpts from letters, notes, essays and an unfinished novel by the writer Raymond Chandler, compiled by Dorothy Gardiner and Kathrine Sorley Walker in 1962. The origins of the collection were contentious: after Chandler's death, his literary agent and lover, Helga Greene, and his private secretary, Jean Fracasse, entered into a legal battle over his estate, in which Greene prevailed.

== Contents ==
The collection includes excerpts from letters by Chandler on various subjects, including literature, film, fellow writers and cats, and the following longer pieces (previously unpublished except as noted):

- "Casual Notes on the Mystery Novel"
- "Notes on English and American Style"
- "Writers in Hollywood" (previously published in the Atlantic Monthly)
- "Ten Per Cent of Your Life" (Atlantic Monthly)
- "A Couple of Writers"
- "The Poodle Springs Story", a Philip Marlowe novel unfinished at the time of Chandler's death, in 1959. It was completed in 1989 by Robert B. Parker as Poodle Springs.
