= Private Eye (1996 video game) =

1996 video game

- Developer(s): Brooklyn Multimedia
- Publisher(s): NA: Simon & Schuster Interactive; EU: Infogrames Entertainment
- Platform(s): Windows, Windows 3.x, Macintosh
- Release: NA: 1996; EU: 1997
- Genre(s): Adventure

Private Eye is a video game developed by Brooklyn Multimedia and published by Simon & Schuster Interactive for Windows in 1996 and Macintosh in 1997.

== Gameplay ==
Private Eye is a murder mystery starring Philip Marlowe where the player chooses how Marlowe handles the case.

== Reception ==
Next Generation reviewed the PC version of the game, rating it two stars out of five, and stated that "Unfortunately, there just isn't much game to hang it on. A click or two every 10 minutes does not balance out the hole it'll leave in your checkbook. Even with its alternate endings and intriguing story, you'd probably be better off renting The Big Sleep (the Bogart version, not Mitchum)."
