= Dance International =

Summer 2012 cover of Dance International

Dance International is a nonprofit arts magazine published four times yearly by the Vancouver Ballet Society and distributed worldwide. It will not publish print issues from the end of 2019.

Each issue offers coverage of the international ballet and contemporary dance scene through feature articles, news, obituaries and reviews (dance, books, films, DVDs), with particular emphasis on Canadian artists, companies, photographers and writers. It is the longest continuously-published dance title in Canada (since 1976); it was initially called Vandance but was renamed Dance International in 1993 to reflect its increasingly global editorial scope better.

The Vancouver Ballet Society, founding publisher of Dance International (DI) magazine, has made the difficult decision to cease publication of the electronic magazine featured on the DI website since January 2020. This sad decision was purely a reflection of the hard economic climate for publishing.

Dance International has been a flagship program for the VBS since 1977 when the then-quarterly print magazine was established. For over 46 years, they have proudly supported dance and dance writers in Canada and around the world through their Vancouver-based publication.

The first editor, Ruth McLoughlin, was followed by Leland Windreich and then briefly by John Warren. From 1985 to 2013 Maureen Riches became the long-standing managing editor. She was influential in advancing the magazine from the few black and white pages of a community-based publication to a richly-coloured, professionally-edited magazine with reports and features from around the globe and support from advertisers. In 2013, when Maureen Riches retired, they were fortunate to appoint Kaija Pepper, a highly respected dance writer, critic and historian as the new managing editor. Kaija Pepper selected a range of diverse material over her tenure and mentored new writers. The DI website would not have survived the last several years without Kaija’s dedication, professionalism, and conscientiousness.

Many writers have contributed features, reviews, and reports over the years, creating a rich history of dance that provide valuable reference material.

At the end of January 2024 the Dance International website closed. Readers are directed to the Vancouver Ballet Society website, where all DI’s digital material is fully archived.
