= Playback (novel) =

Novel by Raymond Chandler

- Cover of the first US edition
- Author: Raymond Chandler
- Language: English
- Series: Philip Marlowe
- Genre: Mystery, crime
- Publisher: Hamish Hamilton (UK); Houghton Mifflin (US)
- Publication date: 1958
- Publication place: United Kingdom
- Media type: Print (hardcover and paperback)
- Pages: 208 pp (hardcover edition)
- Preceded by: The Long Goodbye
- Followed by: Poodle Springs

Playback is a novel by American-British writer Raymond Chandler featuring the private detective Philip Marlowe. It was first published in Britain in July 1958; the US edition followed in October that year. Chandler died the following year; Playback is his last completed novel.

On 8 January 1947, Universal announced they had bought a story from Raymond Chandler called Playback. Joseph Sistrom was assigned to produce the film and it was intended Chandler would write the script. The novel was reworked by Chandler from the screenplay. The script, thought by some to be superior to the novel (generally considered to be the weakest of the seven Marlowe novels, perhaps because of its less complex plot and pat resolution), was published posthumously.

Playback is the only Marlowe novel completed by Chandler that is set somewhere other than Los Angeles. The setting is the town of Esmeralda, a fictional name for La Jolla, where Chandler lived his last few years. Poodle Springs, which Chandler did not finish, is set in Palm Springs, California.

== Plot summary ==
At the beginning of 1952 (some 18 months after the parting of Marlowe and Linda Loring in The Long Goodbye), Marlowe is faced with the choice of turning against his client and taking up the cause of the subject he was hired to investigate, an attractive woman on the run with whom he eventually becomes emotionally entangled.

Through intermediaries, an anonymous client hires Marlowe to find Betty Mayfield, who is traveling under the name Eleanor King. Marlowe trails Mayfield to the small coastal resort town of Esmeralda, California.

During her train ride west, Mayfield had been recognized by a man who then tried to blackmail her, for reasons disclosed at the end of the story. While Marlowe is poking around Esmeralda, the blackmailer is found dead on the balcony of Mayfield's hotel room. She panics and calls Marlowe for help.

Marlowe encounters numerous characters with dubious motivations, including a taciturn lawyer and his smart secretary (with whom Marlowe has a sexual encounter), a "retired" gangster, overconfident would-be tough guys of varying morals, a hired killer (whose wrists Marlowe smashes), decent police officers, and an affectingly desperate example of the immigrant underclass in the United States in the 1950s. Marlowe also has an encounter in a hotel lobby with a reflective elderly gentleman, Henry Clarendon IV, which gives rise to an extended philosophical conversation.

Marlowe learns that Betty Mayfield had been married to Lee Cumberland, the son of Henry Cumberland, a big shot in a small North Carolina town. Lee's neck had been broken during the war, and though he was mobile and not paralyzed, for safety he regularly wore a neck brace. One day there was a quarrel between Lee and Betty, and later Lee was found dead, with Betty trying to place the neck brace back on the body. The case drew widespread publicity in the newspapers (which is why the blackmailer recognized Mayfield on the train), and with Cumberland's influence on the jury, Mayfield was found guilty of murder. But the judge in the case, who saw more than a reasonable doubt, in keeping with North Carolina law granted a standard defense motion for a directed acquittal after the verdict of the tainted jury was returned.

Cumberland vowed to hound Mayfield wherever she went, and so she fled to Esmeralda; Cumberland was presumably behind the hiring of Marlowe in the first place. Cumberland arrives in Esmeralda to confront Mayfield, but Marlowe, with the help of the local police captain, scares him off. (In the British edition of the novel and the screenplay version by Chandler [see below], Cumberland's name is Kinsolving.)

Mayfield marries a local criminal turned respectable citizen, who has taken a romantic interest in her. Marlowe lets her go ahead but has a frank talk with the ex-criminal, who has not entirely mended his ways, as he was behind the killing of the blackmailer.

At the book's conclusion, Marlowe is rewarded by providence when his old flame, Linda Loring, gets back in touch.

== Reception ==
The New York Times called it "smooth, competent, enjoyable and undistinguished... after a wait of four and a half years it's a mousy labor from such a mountain".

== Adaptations ==
Of all Chandler's novels, Playback is the only one never to have been adapted into a film.

=== Radio ===
In 2011, Playback was adapted for radio by BBC Radio Four as part of a season of Chandler adaptations. Marlowe was played by Toby Stephens.

=== Comics ===
French comics artist Ted Benoît and François Ayroles adapted the novel into a 2004 graphic novel.

== References in other works ==
The opening lines of the second chapter served as inspiration for Jonathan Lethem's science fiction–detective novel Gun, with Occasional Music: "There was nothing to it. The Super Chief was on time, as it almost always is, and the subject was as easy to spot as a kangaroo in a dinner jacket."
