= Blackmailers Don't Shoot =

Short story by Raymond Chandler

"Blackmailers Don't Shoot" is a short story by Raymond Chandler. It was first published in December 1933 in the magazine Black Mask.

== Plot summary ==
Rhonda Farr, an actress, is rejecting an ostensible blackmail attempt by Mallory, a private detective, involving love letters she wrote to a man named Landrey, who is now a gangster. After leaving, Mallory is held up by two henchmen, who learn Farr has been kidnapped. One henchman, Macdonald, is not pleased at the news. They bring Mallory to their hideaway, and Macdonald angrily confronts the other gang members about the unplanned kidnapping. He teams up with Mallory and overpowers the others. Mallory explains he was actually hired by Landrey to find the letters. He, Macdonald, and Landrey follow several leads and rescue Farr, but Macdonald, Landrey, and several kidnappers are killed in the process. Mallory gives the letters, which he found on Landrey, to Farr, who tries to pretend she was in on the whole thing. Mallory goes to Landrey's gangster partner, Mardonne, and asks for the fee owed to him. He explains that Landrey used him to fake a blackmail attempt on Farr, as part of a kidnapping scheme to scare her into taking him back. Mardonne is unsure what to make of it, and Mallory suspects him of hoping to continue the blackmail, which is over now that Farr has the letters and can enlist help from the studio. Mardonne ends up being killed inadvertently, and Mallory is wounded. At the police station, the captain tells Mallory the official story for each killing: separate, run-of-the-mill homicides. Mallory smiles and hints at Farr's situation, then leaves for home.

== Adaptions ==
The story was made into an episode of the HBO series Philip Marlowe, Private Eye.
