= Jonathan Valin =

American mystery author (born 1947)

Jonathan Valin (born November 23, 1947, in Cincinnati, Ohio) is an American mystery author best known for the Harry Stoner detective series. He won the Shamus Award for best mystery novel of 1989. After writing eleven Harry Stoner novels over a 14-year period, he took a break from mystery writing to help found Fi, a magazine of music criticism. He now works as an editor and reviewer for magazines. He currently is Executive Editor of The Absolute Sound audio magazine.

He is an alumnus of the University of Chicago and lived in Chicago for many years.

== Reviews ==
- "(Jonathan Valin)'s writing is so fluid, his dialogue so crisp and his stories so well-plotted that each (Harry Stoner) novel is over too soon." --Sun-Sentinel, 1993
- "Valin's latest is riveting, disturbing". --Miami Herald, 1989
- "Since Mr. Valin is an expert writer who provides coherent plots and believable dialogue, it comes as no surprise that his Stoner books have taken hold." --New York Times, 1987

== Bibliography ==
- The Lime Pit (1980)
- Final Notice (1980)
- Dead Letter (1981)
- Day of Wrath (1982)
- Natural Causes (1983)
- Life's Work (1986) (Anthony Award nominee, Best Novel)
- Fire Lake (1987)
- Extenuating Circumstances (1989) (Shamus Award winner, Best Novel)
- Second Chance (1991) (Shamus Award nominee, Best Novel)
- The Music Lovers (1993)
- The RCA Bible (1993)
- Missing (1995)
