= Murder, My Sweet =

1944 film directed by Edward Dmytryk

Murder, My Sweet (Farewell, My Lovely)
- Theatrical release poster
- Directed by: Edward Dmytryk
- Screenplay by: John Paxton
- Based on: Farewell, My Lovely; 1940 novel by Raymond Chandler
- Produced by: Adrian Scott
- Starring: Dick Powell; Claire Trevor; Anne Shirley
- Narrated by: Dick Powell
- Cinematography: Harry J. Wild
- Edited by: Joseph Noriega
- Music by: Roy Webb
- Distributed by: RKO Radio Pictures
- Release date: December 9, 1944 (U.S.)
- Running time: 93 or 95 minutes
- Country: United States
- Language: English
- Budget: $400,000 or $468,000

Murder, My Sweet (released as Farewell, My Lovely in the United Kingdom) is a 1944 American film noir, directed by Edward Dmytryk and starring Dick Powell, Claire Trevor and Anne Shirley (in her final film before retirement). The film is based on Raymond Chandler's 1940 novel Farewell, My Lovely. It was the first film to feature Chandler's primary character, the hard-boiled private detective Philip Marlowe.

Murder, My Sweet is, along with Double Indemnity (released five months prior), one of the first noir films, and a key influence in the development of the genre.

== Plot ==
With his eyes bandaged, private detective Philip Marlowe is interrogated by police lieutenant Randall about two murders.

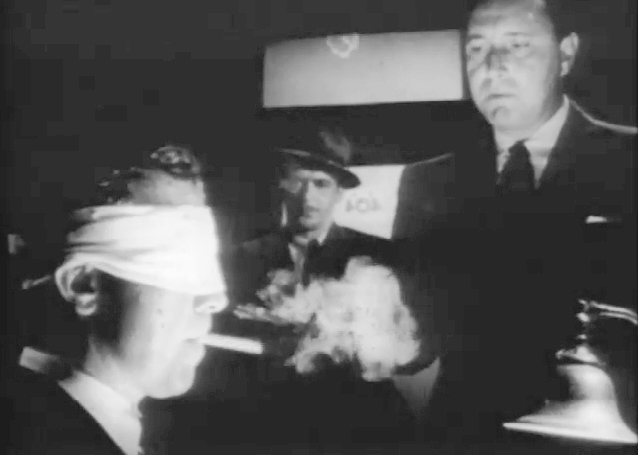
The film's opening scene: Marlowe, Det. Nulty, and Lt. Randall

Marlowe tells how he was hired by ex-con Moose Malloy to locate Malloy's former girlfriend Velma Valento. They go to Florian's, the nightclub where Velma last worked as a singer, but no one remembers her. Marlowe tracks down Jessie Florian, the alcoholic widow of the nightclub's former owner, who hides a photo of Velma and says Velma is dead. Marlowe steals the photo and sees Jessie making a phone call as he leaves.

The next morning, Lindsay Marriott hires Marlowe to be his bodyguard while he acts as a go-between to pay a ransom for some stolen jewels. During the job, Marlowe is knocked unconscious from behind. When he comes to, a young woman shines a flashlight on his face, then runs away. The money is gone, and Marriott has been brutally clubbed to death with a blackjack. When Marlowe reports the murder, the police ask him if he knows a Jules Amthor, and warn him not to interfere in the case.

Ann Grayle tries to pry information out of Marlowe about the murder. She mentions that the jewels were jade, and introduces him to her weak, elderly, and wealthy father, Leuwen Grayle, and his seductive second wife, Helen. Grayle collects rare jade and was attempting to recover a stolen necklace. Jules Amthor, a psychic healer who treated both Helen and Marriott, shows up just as Marlowe is leaving. Helen retains Marlowe to try to recover the jade, but Ann tries bribing him to drop the case.

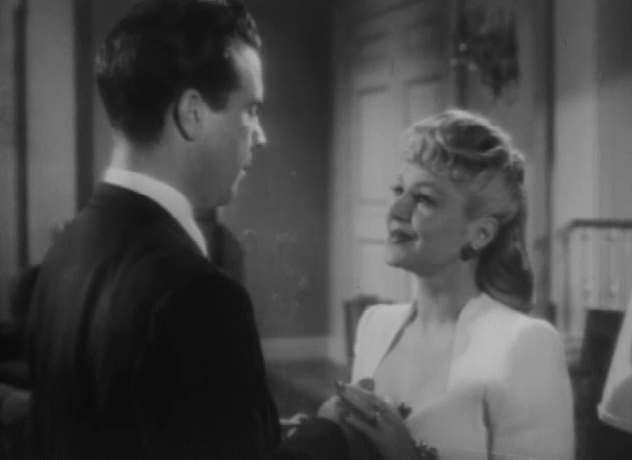
Dick Powell and Claire Trevor from the trailer

In an attempt to locate the jade, Amthor has duped Moose into thinking that Marlowe knows where Velma is. Moose attacks and subdues Marlowe, then Amthor has Marlowe taken to Dr. Sonderberg's sanatorium, where he is drugged and held for three days. Marlowe escapes and convinces Moose that Amthor tricked him, then goes to Ann.

When Marlowe learns that the police had asked Ann's father about the family beach house, which Marriott rented, Marlowe and Ann go there, where they find Helen hiding from the police. Ann leaves to tell her father where his missing wife is. Marlowe deduces that Helen hired him only to set him up for Amthor's interrogations and that Ann was trying to save him from the set-up. Helen attempts to entice Marlowe into helping her murder Amthor. Marlowe seems to go along with her plan, but finds Amthor dead already. Moose is waiting for Marlowe at his office. Marlowe shows Moose the photo of "Velma" he took from Jessie, and as he suspected, it is a fake intended to throw anyone looking for Velma off the track. In fact, Helen is Velma. Marlowe tells Moose to lie low until the next night, when he will take Moose to her.

At the beach house, Marlowe has Moose wait outside while he meets with Helen to find out what happened to the necklace, but she pulls a gun on him. Jessie Florian had tipped her that Marlowe was looking for Velma, so she was faking the robbery and the ransom exchange to kill him. Helen killed Marriott while Marlowe went down into the canyon, and was about to kill Marlowe when Ann came along, worried that her jealous father might be trying to kill Marriott.

As Helen is about to shoot Marlowe, a lovesick Grayle shows up with Ann. He takes Marlowe's gun and kills Helen/Velma. Moose hears the shot and comes in, finding Velma dead. Grayle admits to shooting her, and Moose lunges for Grayle, who shoots him. Marlowe attempts to intercede as the gun goes off and his eyes are burned by the flash. Two more shots are fired.

His story concluded, the temporarily blinded private eye is told that Moose and Grayle shot each other in a struggle for Marlowe's gun. Marlowe is escorted out of the building by Detective Nulty, with Ann following them and overhearing every word. Marlowe expresses his attraction for Ann to the detective. In the back seat of a taxi cab, the bandaged Marlowe recognizes her perfume, and they kiss.

== Cast ==
From the trailer
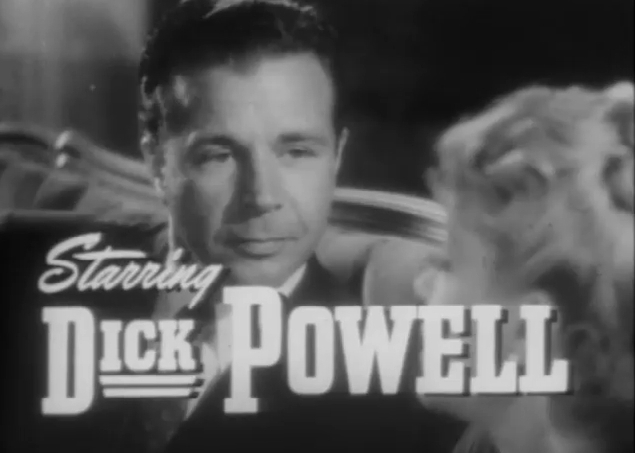
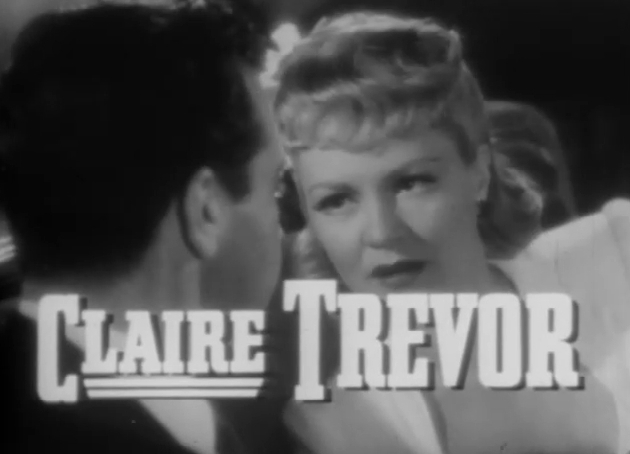
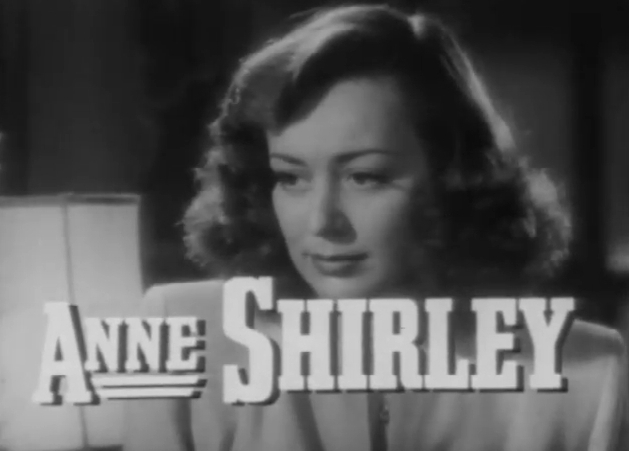
- Dick Powell as Philip Marlowe
- Claire Trevor as Helen Grayle/Velma Valento
- Anne Shirley as Ann Grayle
- Otto Kruger as Jules Amthor
- Mike Mazurki as Moose Malloy
- Miles Mander as Mr. Grayle
- Douglas Walton as Lindsay Marriott
- Don Douglas as Police Lt. Randall
- Ralf Harolde as Dr. Sonderborg
- Esther Howard as Mrs. Jessie Florian
- John Indrisano as chauffeur (Amthor's henchman)
- Dewey Robinson as New Boss at 'Florian's' (uncredited)

== Production ==
The rights to Chandler's Farewell, My Lovely were bought by RKO Radio Pictures for $2,000, and the novel provided the essentials of the plot for The Falcon Takes Over, released in 1942. Another of Chandler's novels had been purchased as well, but in 1944 no studio had yet used Chandler's antihero private detective Philip Marlowe as the protagonist of a film. RKO's studio boss, Charles Koerner, recognized the value of the character and of Chandler's style, and decided to use the rights RKO already owned to make a true adaptation of the novel. He was able to convince RKO's management to make a new version of the book so soon after the previous one by pointing out that the book did not need a great deal of adapting to create a screenplay.

For Murder, My Sweet Koerner assembled a creative staff who were ready to make the move up from B-movies, specifically producer Adrian Scott and director Edward Dmytryk; for Scott, the film was his first as producer. Koerner also revitalized the career of Claire Trevor – who was making Westerns in which she had fourth or fifth billing – and intended the film to be a showcase for the actress, who played a femme fatale. At one point, the studio had considered Ann Dvorak for one of the female leads.

Both Shirley and Trevor tried to convince the studio that they should both play "against type", with perennial good girl Shirley cast as the femme fatale Helen, and Trevor cast as the nice girl, Ann, but their pressure did not convince the studio.

Koerner was also responsible for Dick Powell's transformation from a crooner to playing hard-boiled characters. Powell had been known in the 1930s and early 1940s for light comedies and musicals, but for ten years he had been trying to break away from that typecasting, which he felt he was too old for; he had wanted to play Fred MacMurray's part in Double Indemnity. Koerner wanted Powell under contract to RKO to do musicals, but Powell would only sign if he was allowed to do other kinds of roles, so he offered Powell the opportunity he wanted. However, producer Scott and director Dmytryk were strongly opposed to casting Powell (as was Chandler) – Dmytryk later wrote "The idea of the man who had sung 'Tiptoe Through the Tulips' playing a tough private eye was beyond our imaginations." – Powell had to make a screen test, as a result of which Koerner offered the actor a multi-picture contract with the studio. After the success of the film, and considering the quality of Powell's performance, Koerner dropped the idea of casting Powell in musicals, and cast him instead as other tough guy characters and in action films.

Powell's performance as Philip Marlowe is much debated by fans of Chandler and film noir; some think it too light and comic; while others consider it the best interpretation of Marlowe on film. Chandler himself – who at first had objected to casting Powell – said he was very fond of it, but after seeing Marlowe played by Humphrey Bogart in The Big Sleep, changed his allegiance to Bogart.

Another actor who had to audition to get the role he played was former pro-wrestler-turned-actor Mike Mazurki. Dmytryk wanted a true actor to play the part, but was convinced by Mazurki in a studio commissary discussion to give him a chance; Powell assisted him in his efforts.

The film's screenwriter, John Paxton – a former reporter and publicist whose only previous full-length feature was My Pal Wolf, a girl-and-her-dog film – closely followed Chandler's novel, as well as Chandler's advice: "When your plot hits a snag, have somebody come through the door with a gun." Some aspects of Chandler's plot had to be underplayed because of the Production Code, such as Marriott's homosexuality, or the fact that Amthor and Sonderborg were providing drugs to the elites of Los Angeles. Other parts of the novel, such as a plot thread involving a fleet of gambling boats off the L.A. coast, were dropped completely, but not because of the Code: in real life mobster Anthony Cornero ran such a fleet outside the three-mile limit, and hosted many of Hollywood's movers and shakers, and there was concern about drawing unwanted attention to him. Finally, Florian's, the club Moose first brings Marlowe to in his search for Velma, was originally a club with an exclusively African-American clientele located on Central Avenue in the heart of L.A.'s black district. Making the change meant that the scenes in the club, and with Jessie Florian, would not have to be cut when the film was distributed in Southern states.

Another change made in the adaptation from the book to the film was in the character of Ann Grayle. She was originally the daughter of an honest cop, but changing her to the step-daughter of Trevor's seductress helped to show the differences between the two types of women.

It was producer Scott's idea to shoot the film as an extended flashback, which kept the book's first-person narrative style.

Production on Murder, My Sweet took place from May 8 to July 1, 1944. Shooting on the first day was so hectic that Claire Trevor was being sewn into her dress while the first scene was being set up. A makeup person was left off of the call, so Trevor did her makeup herself. During breaks between scenes, Dick Powell would entertain the other actors with imitations of himself as a singer earlier in his film career.

Night location shooting took place in the Hollywood Hills.

== Release and title change ==
The film was first screened on December 18, 1944 in Minneapolis, Minnesota with the title Farewell, My Lovely, and also played in previews in New England with that title. A survey by Audience Research Inc. indicated that viewers thought that the title suggested a Dick Powell musical, so the film's name was changed, delaying its release. It opened in New York City on March 8, 1945 as Murder, My Sweet.

== Response ==
=== Critical reception ===
James Agee, critic writing in The Nation in 1944, stated, "I suppose a lot that I like about it is not really good except by comparison with the deadly norm ... Nevertheless, I enjoyed the romanticism of the picture, and its hopefulness and energy, and much of its acting—that of Miles Mander, Claire Trevor, Ralfe Harald, and Dick Powell especially. Even its messiness and semi-accomplishment made me feel better about it than about the much better-finished, more nearly unimpeachable, but more academic and complacent Double Indemnity." Leslie Halliwell gave it three of four stars, stating: "A revolutionary crime film ... One of the first films noirs of the mid-forties, a minor masterpiece of expressionist film making ... " Pauline Kael wasn't impressed: " ... the movie is energetic enough, but its crumminess can't all be explained by fidelity to the material. Edward Dmytryk directed, in the brutal, fast style popular in the war years ... "

Alison Dalzell, writing for the Edinburgh University Film Society, notes:

Of all the adaptations of Chandler novels, this film comes as close as any to matching their stylish first person narrative and has the cinematic skill and bravado of direction to carry it off. Since the '40s countless mystery and neo-noir films have been made in Hollywood and around the world. Murder, My Sweet is what they all aspire to be.

According to film critics Ellen Keneshea and Carl Macek, the picture takes Chandler's novel and transforms it into a "film with a dark ambiance unknown at [the] time". Dmytryk was able to transcend the tough dialogue and mystery film conventions by creating a "cynical vision of society". As such, the film enters the world of film noir.

When the film was released, Bosley Crowther, the film critic for The New York Times, appreciated the adaptation of Chandler's novel and lauded the acting and writing:

Practically all of the supporting roles are exceptionally well played, particularly by Mike Mazurki, the former wrestler, as the brutish Moose Malloy; Otto Kruger as Jules Amthor, quack-psychologist and insidious blackmailer; Anne Shirley as an innocent among the wolf pack, and Don Douglas as the police lieutenant. In short, Murder, My Sweet is pulse-quickening entertainment.

The staff at Variety magazine also gave the film kudos, writing:

Murder, My Sweet, a taut thriller about a private detective enmeshed with a gang of blackmailers, is as smart as it is gripping ... Performances are on a par with the production. Dick Powell is a surprise as the hard-boiled copper. The portrayal is potent and convincing. Claire Trevor is as dramatic as the predatory femme, with Anne Shirley in sharp contrast as the soft kid caught in the crossfire.

=== Box office ===
The film made a profit of $597,000.

== Awards and honors ==
Murder, My Sweet won four 1946 Edgar Awards from the Mystery Writers of America:

- Best Motion Picture
- John Paxton (screenplay)
- Raymond Chandler (author)
- Dick Powell (actor)

== Other versions ==
- The Chandler novel had been filmed once before, in 1942, as The Falcon Takes Over, directed by Irving Reis, part of a film series which featured George Sanders as The Falcon.
- In 1975, the story was remade under its original title as Farewell, My Lovely starring Robert Mitchum as Marlowe and directed by Dick Richards.
- The film version of Murder, My Sweet was dramatized as an hour-long radio play on June 11, 1945, broadcast of Lux Radio Theater, with Powell and Trevor in their original film roles.
- Another radio adaptation, with Powell and Mike Mazurki reprising their roles, was presented on Hollywood Star Time in 1948, with Mary Astor playing Helen.
- The success of Murder, My Sweet inspired the creation of two radio series: 1947's short-lived Philip Marlow with Van Heflin in the lead role, and The Adventures of Philip Marlowe which played from 1948 to 1951, with Gerald Mohr as Marlowe. The latter was the most popular show on radio in 1949.

== See also ==
- List of American films of 1944
