= Joyce Harrington =

American novelist (1931–2011)

Joyce Harrington (November 21, 1931 – March 10, 2011) was an American writer.

She was born on November 21, 1931, in Marietta, Ohio. She attended Marietta College and graduated with an A.B. in 1953. She died in 2011.

== Awards ==
Before writing her three novels, Harrington was well known for her short stories. In 1973, she won the Edgar Allan Poe award, Mystery Writers of America for her short story The Purple Shroud.

== Works ==
- No One Knows My Name (novel), St. Martin's (New York, NY), 1980 ISBN 978-0380573493
- Family Reunion (novel), St. Martin's (New York, NY), 1982, ISBN 978-0380630998
- Dreemz of the Night (novel), St. Martin's (New York, NY), 1987 ISBN 978-0312005900
