= Farewell, My Lovely =

1940 novel by Raymond Chandler

- Cover of the first edition
- Author: Raymond Chandler
- Cover artist: Hans J. Barschel
- Language: English
- Genre: Detective fiction, hardboiled, noir fiction
- Set in: Los Angeles and Bay City, California, 1930s
- Publisher: Alfred A. Knopf
- Publication date: 1940
- Publication place: United States
- Media type: Print
- ISBN: 0-394-75827-7
- OCLC: 256294215
- Dewey Decimal: 813/.52 19
- LC Class: PS3505.H3224 F3 1988/1940
- Preceded by: The Big Sleep
- Followed by: The High Window

Farewell, My Lovely is a novel by Raymond Chandler, published in 1940, the second novel he wrote featuring the Los Angeles private eye Philip Marlowe. It was adapted for the screen three times and was also adapted for the stage and radio.

== Plot ==
Private detective Philip Marlowe is investigating a dead-end missing person case in Bay City (based on Santa Monica) when he sees a felon, Moose Malloy, barging into a club called Florian's, looking for his ex-girlfriend Velma Valento. The club has changed owners and now has an African-American clientele and staff, so no one there now knows her. Malloy ends up killing the owner of the club and escaping. The murder case is assigned to Lt. Nulty, a Bay City police detective who has no interest in the murder of a black man. Marlowe advises Nulty to look for Malloy's girlfriend, but Nulty prefers to let Marlowe do the routine legwork and rely on finding Malloy based on his huge size and loud clothes. Marlowe decides to follow up and look for the girl.

Marlowe tracks down Mrs. Jessie Florian, the widow of the nightclub's former owner, and plies her with bourbon. Mrs. Florian remembers Malloy's girlfriend and tells Marlowe she is dead. He manages to get hold of a photo that's signed, "Always yours, Velma Valento" and takes it with him. Before making further progress, Marlowe receives a call from a man named Lindsay Marriott, who claims his friend has been robbed and requests Marlowe's presence in delivering a ransom payment for a stolen necklace. Later that evening, in a deserted canyon, Marlowe waits in the dark and is hit on the head from behind. When he awakes, Marriott is dead. A passerby, Anne Riordan, finds him and takes him home.

Lt. Randall, the cunning but honest Los Angeles cop investigating Marriott's murder, is skeptical about the story. At Marlowe's office, Anne explains that she is from Bay City, a policeman's daughter interested in local crime. Anne's father was cashiered by the corrupt cops running the Bay City police. She tells Marlowe that she learned from Randall that the necklace belongs to a Mrs. Lewin Lockridge Grayle, the young wife of a wealthy and influential Bay City resident. Mrs. Grayle is a ravishing blonde whom Grayle met when she was singing for the radio station he owned. She married him in Europe under an assumed name to keep her background secret. Anne offers to have her hire Marlowe to find the necklace.

Marlowe examines some marijuana cigarettes he found on Marriott's body and discovers the card of a psychic, Jules Amthor. He makes an appointment to see him. On a hunch, he investigates Mrs. Florian's house and discovers that Marriott held a trust deed on it, meaning he could foreclose on her at will. Following up with Mrs. Florian, she reveals she was once a servant for Marriott's family, and Marlowe suspects she was somehow blackmailing him. Marlowe visits Mrs. Grayle, who finds him attractive and hires him, which he can use as an excuse to continue investigating the two murders. They make a date to meet again at the club of a local hoodlum, Laird Brunette, near the spot where Marriott was killed.

At Amthor's office, Marlowe probes him for his connection to Marriott and the drugs. Amthor summons a pair of Bay City detectives out of their jurisdiction to arrest Marlowe, claiming Marlowe tried to blackmail him. Instead of taking him to jail, the detectives knock Marlowe unconscious and lock him up in a private hospital run by Dr. Sonderborg, a drug dealer who keeps him docile with drug injections. Marlowe escapes, but on the way out, he sees Malloy in another room. He discusses the case with Randall, who is annoyed at his persistence in investigating. They suspect Marriott of blackmailing wealthy women, in league with Amthor. They return to Mrs. Florian's home only to find her murdered, apparently shaken to death by Malloy.

Because of the involvement of the Bay City cops whom Amthor called in, Marlowe visits the corrupt police chief, John Wax, who brushes him off until Marlowe mentions that he has been hired by Mrs. Grayle. Marlowe is then told that Malloy may be hiding out on a gambling boat anchored beyond the three-mile limit and run by Brunette, who also controls the corrupt Bay City government. Marlowe sneaks on board with the help of Red Norgaard, another honest cop fired by Bay City, and despite being caught by Brunette, persuades him to pass a message through his criminal network to Malloy.

Marlowe calls Mrs. Grayle, ostensibly to have her pick him up at his apartment for their date. Responding to his message, Malloy shows up first and hides when Mrs. Grayle arrives. Marlowe confronts her: she is Velma Valento and had used Marriott to keep Mrs. Florian in line after she recognized Velma's voice on Grayle's radio station. Marriott had worked as an announcer at the same station. Mrs. Grayle convinced Marriott to set up Marlowe to be killed in the canyon, but actually did so to kill Marriott because she viewed him as a "weak link" who would reveal her secret past. She had also informed on Malloy about the robbery that sent him to prison. When Malloy hears this, he steps out to confront Velma, who shoots him fatally and flees.

Amthor, Sonderborg and the crooked cops are all exposed; Red gets his job back. Velma flees, but when she is eventually tracked down in Baltimore, she kills the detective who recognizes her and commits suicide when cornered.

== Characters ==
- Philip Marlowe
- Lt. Nulty
- Lt. Carl Randall
- Moose Malloy
- Mrs. Jessie Florian
- Lindsay Marriott
- Jules Amthor
- Dr. Sonderborg
- Mr. Lewin Lockridge Grayle
- Mrs. Lewin Lockridge Grayle, also known as Velma Valento
- Laird Brunette
- Anne Riordan
- John Wax

== Background ==
Chandler worked on the book from June to December 1939, before destroying the entire typescript and starting again. He completed the novel in the spring of 1940. Farewell, My Lovely, like many of Chandler's novels, was written by what he called cannibalising previous short stories—taking short stories and altering them to fit together as a novel. This practice is sometimes known as a fix-up. In this case the three stories were "Try the Girl", "Mandarin's Jade" and "The Man Who Liked Dogs".

"Try the Girl" provided the initial story about a hoodlum looking for his old girlfriend who has moved on to a more respectable life. "Mandarin's Jade" was the basis for the middle sections about a jewel theft which may or may not have happened, the murder of a blackmailer and a corrupt psychic who works with a crime ring. "The Man Who Liked Dogs" provided the final part, where the detective is looking for a criminal and his search ultimately takes him to a gambling boat anchored off the Santa Monica coast, out of reach of the local law.

In the short stories, the criminals and motives are clearly explained by the end. As Chandler adapted and integrated the stories—which were originally written independently—he cared more about the style of writing and the characters than about making sure every plot point fitted together with consistency and lucidity. As he said of his work, "my whole career is based on the idea that the formula doesn't matter, the thing that counts is what you do with the formula; that is to say, it is a matter of style". Chandler used this writing style to develop his themes of corruption, social decay, cynicism and fatalism.

Chandler used recognizable locations in Los Angeles as settings but he created the fictional town of Bay City as a stand-in for Santa Monica, known for its widespread corruption in city government during the Great Depression. The title of the novel is apparently a reference to a song in the 1935 musical revue At Home Abroad.

== Film adaptations ==
Farewell, My Lovely was the first Philip Marlowe novel to be filmed. In 1942, The Falcon Takes Over, a 65-minute film that was the third in the Falcon series about Michael Arlen's gentleman sleuth Gay Lawrence (played by George Sanders), used the plot of Farewell, My Lovely. In 1944, Dick Powell played the part of the hard-boiled detective, named Philip Marlowe this time, in a classic film noir release—alternatively titled Murder, My Sweet (in the United States) and Farewell, My Lovely (in the UK)—two years before cinema-goers saw Humphrey Bogart as Philip Marlowe in The Big Sleep (1946). In 1975, Robert Mitchum starred in a remake of Farewell, My Lovely.

Although not technically an adaptation, the "Harlem Nocturne" episode of the television series The New Mike Hammer (aired 26 November 1986 on CBS) borrowed major plot details from the novel's story of the search by a huge ex-con for his former girlfriend and criminal partner, including the fight in the bar and someone deliberately identifying a photo incorrectly and then being killed.

	The Falcon Takes Over	Murder, My Sweet	Farewell, My Lovely
Year of release	1942	1944	1975
Director	Irving Reis	Edward Dmytryk	Dick Richards
Screenwriter	Lynn Root and Frank Fenton	John Paxton	David Zelag Goodman
Setting	New York	Los Angeles	1941 Los Angeles
Philip Marlowe	George Sanders (as "Gay Lawrence")	Dick Powell	Robert Mitchum
Helen Grayle	Helen Gilbert (as "Diana Kenyon")	Claire Trevor	Charlotte Rampling
Anne Riordan	Lynn Bari	Anne Shirley	—
Moose Malloy	Ward Bond	Mike Mazurki	Jack O'Halloran
Jules Amthor	Turhan Bey	Otto Kruger	Kate Murtagh (as "Frances Amthor")
Jessie Florian	Anne Revere	Esther Howard	Sylvia Miles
Mr. Grayle	—	Miles Mander	Jim Thompson
Lindsay Marriott	Hans Conried	Douglas Walton	John O'Leary
Laird Brunette	Selmer Jackson (as "Laird Burnett")	—	Anthony Zerbe

== Radio adaptations ==
The novel was adapted on BBC Radio 4 by Bill Morrison, directed by John Tydeman and broadcast on 22 September 1988, starring Ed Bishop as Marlowe. BBC Radio 4, as part of its Classic Chandler series, also broadcast on 19 February 2011 a dramatic adaptation by Robin Brooks, with Toby Stephens as the hardboiled detective. It was adapted in a condensed form under the title of Murder My Sweet on Hollywood Star Time, broadcast on 8 June 1946, starring Dick Powell.

== Cultural references ==
In the opening episode of the television series Bored to Death, the character Jonathan Ames, played by Jason Schwartzman, is inspired to become a private detective after reading the book.
