= Raymond Chandler =

American novelist and screenwriter (1888–1959)

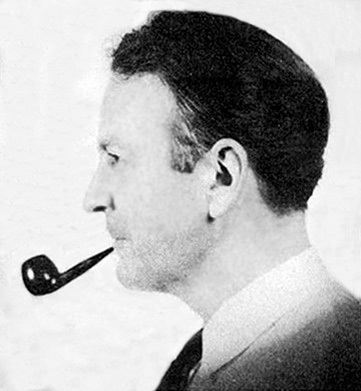
- Chandler c. 1943
- Born: Raymond Thornton Chandler; July 23, 1888; Chicago, Illinois, U.S.
- Died: March 26, 1959 (aged 70); San Diego, California, U.S.
- Resting place: Mount Hope Cemetery, San Diego, U.S.
- Education: Dulwich College
- Occupations: Novelist; screenwriter
- Spouse: Cissy Pascal (m. 1924; died 1954)
- Writing career
- Period: 1933–1959
- Genres: Crime fiction, suspense, hardboiled

Raymond Thornton Chandler (July 23, 1888 – March 26, 1959) was an American-British novelist and screenwriter. In 1932, at age 44, Chandler became a detective fiction writer after losing his job as an oil company executive during the Great Depression. His first short story, "Blackmailers Don't Shoot", was published in 1933 in Black Mask, a pulp magazine. His first novel, The Big Sleep, was published in 1939. In addition to his short stories, Chandler published seven novels during his lifetime (an eighth, in progress at the time of his death, was completed by Robert B. Parker). All but Playback have been made into motion pictures, some more than once.

Chandler had an immense stylistic influence on American popular literature. He is a founder of the hardboiled school of detective fiction, along with Dashiell Hammett, James M. Cain, and other Black Mask writers. The protagonist of his novels, Philip Marlowe, like Hammett's Sam Spade, is considered by some to be synonymous with "private detective". Both were played in films by Humphrey Bogart, whom many consider to be the quintessential Marlowe.

The Big Sleep placed second on the Crime Writers' Association poll of the 100 best crime novels; Farewell, My Lovely (1940), The Lady in the Lake (1943), and The Long Goodbye (1953) also made the list. The latter novel was praised in an anthology of American crime stories as "arguably the first book since Hammett's The Glass Key, published more than twenty years earlier, to qualify as a serious and significant mainstream novel that just happened to possess elements of mystery". Chandler was also a perceptive critic of detective fiction; his "The Simple Art of Murder" is the canonical essay in the field. In it he wrote: "Down these mean streets a man must go who is not himself mean, who is neither tarnished nor afraid. The detective must be a complete man and a common man and yet an unusual man. He must be, to use a rather weathered phrase, a man of honor—by instinct, by inevitability, without thought of it, and certainly without saying it. He must be the best man in his world and a good enough man for any world."

Parker wrote that, with Marlowe, "Chandler seems to have created the culminating American hero: wised up, hopeful, thoughtful, adventurous, sentimental, cynical, and rebellious—an innocent who knows better, a Romantic who is tough enough to sustain Romanticism in a world that has seen the eternal footman hold its coat and snicker. Living at the end of the Far West, where the American dream ran out of room, no hero has ever been more congruent with his landscape. Chandler had the right hero in the right place, and engaged him in the consideration of good and evil at precisely the time when our central certainty of good no longer held."

== Life and career ==
=== Early life ===
A blue plaque marks the house in Cathedral Square where Chandler stayed in Waterford, Ireland.

Chandler was born in 1888 in Chicago, the son of Florence Dart (Thornton) and Maurice Benjamin Chandler. He spent his early years in Plattsmouth, Nebraska, living with his mother and father near his cousins and his aunt (his mother's sister) and uncle. Chandler's father, a civil engineer who worked for the railway, was an alcoholic and abandoned the family in the early 1890s. To obtain the best possible education for Raymond, his mother, who was originally from Ireland, went to live in England with Raymond in 1900 (in Upper Norwood, then in the county of Surrey but now in the London Borough of Croydon). Raymond lived there with his mother, unmarried aunt, and maternal grandmother between 1901 and 1907. Another uncle, a successful lawyer in Waterford, Ireland, reluctantly supported them while they lived in Upper Norwood. Raymond was a first cousin to the actor Max Adrian, a founding member of the Royal Shakespeare Company; Max's mother Mabel was a sister of Florence Thornton. Chandler was classically educated at Dulwich College, London (a public school whose alumni include the authors P. G. Wodehouse and C. S. Forester). He spent some of his childhood summers in Waterford in Ireland with his mother's family. He did not go to university, instead spending time in Paris and Munich improving his foreign language skills. In 1907, he was naturalized as a British subject in order to take the civil service examination, which he passed. He then took an Admiralty job, lasting just over a year. His first poem was published during that time.

Chandler disliked the servility of the civil service and resigned, to the consternation of his family. He then became a reporter for the Daily Express and also wrote for The Westminster Gazette. He was unsuccessful as a journalist, but he published reviews and continued writing romantic poetry. An encounter with the slightly older Richard Barham Middleton is said to have influenced him into postponing his career as writer. "I met ... also a young, bearded, and sad-eyed man called Richard Middleton. ... Shortly afterwards he committed suicide in Antwerp, a suicide of despair, I should say. The incident made a great impression on me, because Middleton struck me as having far more talent than I was ever likely to possess; and if he couldn't make a go of it, it wasn't very likely that I could." Accounting for that time he said, "Of course in those days as now there were ... clever young men who made a decent living as freelances for the numerous literary weeklies", but "I was distinctly not a clever young man. Nor was I at all a happy young man."

In 1912, at the age of 24, he borrowed money from his Waterford uncle, who expected it to be repaid with interest, and returned to America, visiting his aunt and uncle before settling in San Francisco for a time, where he took a correspondence course in bookkeeping, finishing ahead of schedule. His mother joined him there in late 1912. Encouraged by Chandler's attorney/oilman friend Warren Lloyd, they moved to Los Angeles in 1913, where he strung tennis rackets, picked fruit and endured a time of scrimping and saving. He found steady employment with the Los Angeles Creamery. In 1917, he traveled to Victoria, where in August he enlisted in the 50th Reinforcement Battalion Canadian Expeditionary Force. He saw combat in the trenches in France with the 7th Battalion C.E.F. (British Columbia Regiment). He was twice hospitalized with Spanish flu during the pandemic and was undergoing flight training in the fledgling Royal Air Force (RAF) when the war ended.

After the armistice, he returned to Los Angeles by way of Vancouver, and soon began a love affair with Pearl Eugenie ("Cissy") Pascal, a married woman 18 years his senior and the stepmother of Gordon Pascal, with whom Chandler had enlisted. Cissy amicably divorced her husband, Julian, in 1920, but Chandler's mother disapproved of the relationship and refused to sanction the marriage. For the next four years Chandler supported both his mother and Cissy. After the death of Florence Chandler on September 26, 1923, he was free to marry Cissy. They were married on February 6, 1924. Having begun in 1922 as a bookkeeper and auditor, Chandler was by 1931 a highly paid vice president of the Dabney Oil Syndicate, but his alcoholism, absenteeism, promiscuity with female employees, and threatened suicides contributed to his dismissal a year later, after ten years with the company.

=== As a writer ===
In straitened financial circumstances during the Great Depression, Chandler turned to his latent writing talent to earn a living, teaching himself to write pulp fiction by analyzing and imitating a novelette by Erle Stanley Gardner. Chandler's first professional work, "Blackmailers Don't Shoot", was published in Black Mask magazine in 1933. According to genre historian Herbert Ruhm, "Chandler, who worked slowly and painstakingly, revising again and again, had taken five months to write the story. Erle Stanley Gardner could turn out a pulp story in three or four days—and turned out an estimated one thousand."

His first novel, The Big Sleep, was published in 1939, featuring the detective Philip Marlowe, speaking in the first person. In 1950, Chandler described in a letter to his English publisher, Hamish Hamilton, why he began reading pulp magazines and later wrote for them:

Wandering up and down the Pacific Coast in an automobile I began to read pulp magazines, because they were cheap enough to throw away and because I never had at any time any taste for the kind of thing which is known as women's magazines. This was in the great days of the Black Mask (if I may call them great days) and it struck me that some of the writing was pretty forceful and honest, even though it had its crude aspect. I decided that this might be a good way to try to learn to write fiction and get paid a small amount of money at the same time. I spent five months over an 18,000 word novelette and sold it for $180. After that I never looked back, although I had a good many uneasy periods looking forward.

His second Marlowe novel, Farewell, My Lovely (1940), became the basis for three movie versions adapted by other screenwriters, including the 1944 film Murder My Sweet, which marked the screen debut of the Marlowe character, played by Dick Powell (whose depiction of Marlowe was applauded by Chandler). Literary success and film adaptations led to a demand for Chandler himself as a screenwriter. He and Billy Wilder co-wrote Double Indemnity (1944), based on James M. Cain's novel of the same title. The noir screenplay was nominated for an Academy Award. Said Wilder, "I would just guide the structure and I would also do a lot of the dialogue, and he (Chandler) would then comprehend and start constructing too." Wilder acknowledged that the dialogue which makes the film so memorable was largely Chandler's.

Chandler's only produced original screenplay was The Blue Dahlia (1946). He had not written a denouement for the script and, according to producer John Houseman, Chandler concluded he could finish the script only if drunk, with the assistance of round-the-clock secretaries and drivers, which Houseman agreed to. The script gained Chandler's second Academy Award nomination for screenplay.

Chandler collaborated on the screenplay of Alfred Hitchcock's Strangers on a Train (1951), an ironic murder story based on Patricia Highsmith's novel, which he thought implausible. Chandler clashed with Hitchcock and they stopped talking after Hitchcock heard Chandler had referred to him as "that fat bastard". Hitchcock made a show of throwing Chandler's two draft screenplays into the studio trash can while holding his nose, but Chandler retained the lead screenwriting credit along with Czenzi Ormonde.

In 1946, the Chandlers moved to La Jolla, an affluent coastal neighborhood of San Diego, California, where Chandler wrote two more Philip Marlowe novels, The Long Goodbye and his last completed work, Playback. The latter was derived from an unproduced courtroom drama screenplay he had written for Universal Studios.

Four chapters of a novel, unfinished at his death, were transformed into a final Philip Marlowe novel, Poodle Springs, by the mystery writer and Chandler admirer Robert B. Parker, in 1989. Parker shares the authorship with Chandler. Parker subsequently wrote a sequel to The Big Sleep entitled Perchance to Dream, which was salted with quotes from the original novel. Chandler's final Marlowe short story, circa 1957, was entitled "The Pencil". It later provided the basis of an episode of the HBO miniseries (1983–86), Philip Marlowe, Private Eye, starring Powers Boothe as Marlowe.

In 2014, "The Princess and the Pedlar" (1917), a previously unknown comic operetta, with libretto by Chandler and music by Julian Pascal, was discovered among the uncatalogued holdings of the Library of Congress. The work was never published or produced. It has been dismissed by the Raymond Chandler estate as "no more than… a curiosity." A small team under the direction of the actor and director Paul Sand is seeking permission to produce the operetta in Los Angeles.

The university of Oxford preserves some of Chandler's papers in the archives of the Bodleian Library. These include correspondence with his publisher, Hamish Hamilton, Ltd.

=== Later life and death ===
Cissy Chandler died in 1954, after a long illness. Heartbroken and drunk, Chandler neglected to inter her cremated remains, and they sat for 57 years in a storage locker in the basement of Cypress View Mausoleum.

After Cissy's death, Chandler's loneliness worsened his propensity for clinical depression; he returned to drinking alcohol, never quitting it for long, and the quality and quantity of his writing suffered. In 1955, he attempted suicide. In The Long Embrace: Raymond Chandler and the Woman He Loved, Judith Freeman says it was "a cry for help," given that he called the police beforehand, saying he planned to kill himself. Chandler's personal and professional life were both helped and complicated by the women to whom he was attracted, notably Helga Greene (his literary agent), Jean Fracasse (his secretary), Sonia Orwell (George Orwell's widow), and Natasha Spender (Stephen Spender's wife). Chandler regained his U.S. citizenship in 1956, while retaining his British rights. In the year before his death, he was elected president of the Mystery Writers of America.

After a respite in England, he returned to La Jolla. He died at Scripps Memorial Hospital of pneumonial peripheral vascular shock and prerenal uremia (according to the death certificate) in 1959. Helga Greene inherited Chandler's $60,000 estate, after prevailing in a 1960 lawsuit filed by Fracasse contesting Chandler's holographic codicil to his will.

Chandler is buried at Mount Hope Cemetery, in San Diego, California. As Frank MacShane noted in his biography, The Life of Raymond Chandler, Chandler wished to be cremated and placed next to Cissy in Cypress View Mausoleum. Instead, he was buried in Mount Hope, because he had left no funeral or burial instructions. When he died he was remembered as, "the author of “The Big Sleep,” and other mystery novels."

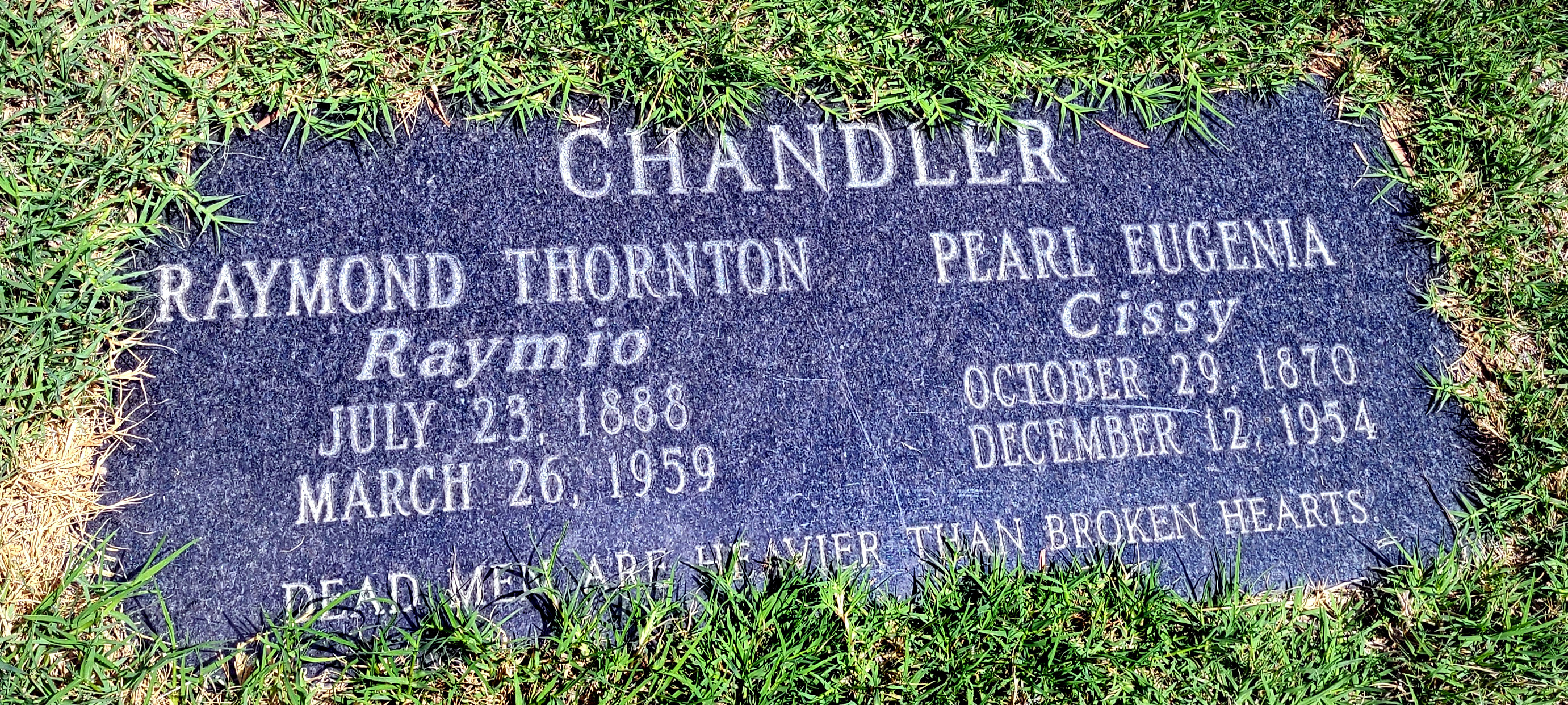
Raymond and Cissy Chandler's tombstone

In 2010, Chandler scholar Loren Latker brought a petition to disinter Cissy's remains and reinter them with Chandler in Mount Hope. After a hearing in September 2010 in San Diego Superior Court, Judge Richard S. Whitney entered an order granting Latker's request.

On February 14, 2011, Cissy's ashes were conveyed from Cypress View to Mount Hope and interred under a new grave marker above Chandler's, as they had wished. About 100 people attended the ceremony, which included readings by the Rev. Randal Gardner, Powers Boothe, Judith Freeman and Aissa Wayne. The shared gravestone reads, "Dead men are heavier than broken hearts", a quotation from The Big Sleep. Chandler's original gravestone, placed by Jean Fracasse and her children, is still at the head of his grave; the new one is at the foot.

== Views on pulp fiction ==
In his introduction to Trouble Is My Business (1950), a collection of many of his short stories, Chandler provided insight on the formula for the detective story and how the pulp magazines differed from previous detective stories. While detective stories were generally centered around the final scene, the stories in Black Mask prioritized scenes over the plot, as good plots were ones which made good scenes and "The ideal mystery was one you would read if the end was missing". He recalled a Hollywood producer telling him he couldn't make a successful movie from a mystery story, since the final disclosure the story was based on would be a few seconds "while the audience was reaching for its hat." According to Chandler, the hardboiled story does not believe justice will be served for a murder unless someone goes out of their way to make it so, and the stories were about those people (police officers, private detectives or newspaper men). The stories also had a fantasy element, as in reality, such events did not happen as quickly, within such a small group, or in such a narrow frame of logic; this was due to a demand for constant action.

Chandler also wrote that there was a rigid formula which restricted writers' output, as their stories would be sent back if they didn't fit. According to him, "To exceed the limits of a formula without destroying it is the dream of every magazine writer who is not a hopeless hack."

== Reputation ==
Critics and writers, including W. H. Auden, Evelyn Waugh and Ian Fleming, greatly admired Chandler's prose. In a radio discussion with Chandler, Fleming said that Chandler offered "some of the finest dialogue written in any prose today". Contemporary mystery writer Paul Levine has described Chandler's style as the "literary equivalent of a quick punch to the gut". Chandler's swift-moving, hardboiled style was inspired mostly by Dashiell Hammett, but his sharp and lyrical similes are original: "The muzzle of the Luger looked like the mouth of the Second Street tunnel"; "He had a heart as big as one of Mae West's hips"; "Dead men are heavier than broken hearts"; "I went back to the seasteps and moved down them as cautiously as a cat on a wet floor"; "He was crazy as a pair of waltzing mice, but I liked him"; "I felt like an amputated leg"; "He was about as inconspicuous as a tarantula on a slice of angel food." Chandler's writing redefined the private eye fiction genre, led to the coining of the adjective "Chandleresque", and inevitably became the subject of parody and pastiche. Yet the detective Philip Marlowe is not a stereotypical tough guy, but a complex, sometimes sentimental man with few friends, who attended university, who speaks some Spanish and sometimes admires Mexicans and Blacks, and who is a student of chess and classical music. He is a man who refuses a prospective client's fee for a job he considers unethical.

The high regard in which Chandler is generally held today is in contrast to the critical sniping that stung the author during his lifetime. In a March 1942 letter to Blanche Knopf, published in Selected Letters of Raymond Chandler, he wrote, "The thing that rather gets me down is that when I write something that is tough and fast and full of mayhem and murder, I get panned for being tough and fast and full of mayhem and murder, and then when I try to tone down a bit and develop the mental and emotional side of a situation, I get panned for leaving out what I was panned for putting in the first time."

Although his work enjoys general acclaim today, Chandler has been criticized for certain aspects of his writing. The Washington Post reviewer Patrick Anderson described his plots as "rambling at best and incoherent at worst" (notoriously, although perhaps also anecdotally, even Chandler did not know who murdered the chauffeur in The Big Sleep) and Anderson criticized Chandler's treatment of black, female, and homosexual characters, calling him a "rather nasty man at times". Anderson nevertheless praised Chandler as "probably the most lyrical of the major crime writers".

Chandler's short stories and novels are evocatively written, conveying the time, place and ambiance of Los Angeles and environs in the 1930s and 1940s. The places are real, if pseudonymous: Bay City is Santa Monica, Gray Lake is Silver Lake, and Idle Valley a synthesis of wealthy San Fernando Valley communities.

Playback is the only one of his novels not to have been made into a movie. Arguably the most notable adaptation is Howard Hawks The Big Sleep (1946), with Humphrey Bogart as Marlowe. William Faulkner and Leigh Brackett were co-writers of the screenplay. Chandler's few screenwriting efforts and the cinematic adaptation of his novels proved stylistically and thematically influential on the American film noir genre. Notable for its revised take on Marlowe is Robert Altman's 1973 neo-noir adaptation of The Long Goodbye. Later in a review for The New Yorker discussing the film adaptation of The Long Goodbye, Pauline Kael describes Chandler as "locked in the conventions of pulp writing" and that he "never found a way of dealing with that malaise."

=== Legacy ===
Raymond Chandler Square
- Interactive map of Raymond Chandler Square
- 34°06′06″N 118°19′47″W
- Location: Hollywood and Cahuenga Boulevard, Hollywood, California

Los Angeles Historic-Cultural Monument
- Designated: August 5, 1994
- Reference no.: 597

The intersection of Hollywood Boulevard and Cahuenga Avenue in Hollywood, California is named Raymond Chandler Square, a tribute both to the author and to the belief that Philip Marlowe's office was located in Security Trust and Savings at the northeast corner. In 1994, the square was designated Los Angeles Historic Cultural Monument No. 597.

In 2014, the Hollywood Walk of Fame selection committee announced that Raymond Chandler would be included the following year; however, as of 2024, he has not been.

In 1991, Fulbright Program gave out a "Raymond Chandler Mystery Writing Award" and in 1994, they gave out a "Raymond Chandler Award". Noir in Festival's lifetime achievement award is also named after Raymond Chandler.

== Works ==
=== Novels and novellas ===
- The Big Sleep (1939)
- Farewell, My Lovely (1940)
- The High Window (1942)
- The Lady in the Lake (1943)
- The Little Sister (1949)
- The Long Goodbye (1953)
- Playback (1958)
- Raymond Chandler Speaking (1962)

==== Posthumously completed ====
- Poodle Springs (completed by Robert B. Parker, published 1989)

=== Screenplays ===
- Double Indemnity (1944), with Billy Wilder, nominated for the Academy Award for Best Adapted Screenplay
- And Now Tomorrow (1944), with Frank Partos
- The Unseen (1946), with Hagar Wilde
- The Blue Dahlia (1946), nominated for the Academy Award for Best Original Screenplay
- Strangers on a Train (1951), with Czenzi Ormonde
