= Gunsmoke: To the Last Man =

1992 TV film

- DVD cover
- Genre: Western
- Based on: Gunsmoke
- Written by: Earl W. Wallace
- Directed by: Jerry Jameson
- Starring: James Arness; Pat Hingle; Amy Stoch; Matt Mulhern; Jason Lively; Joseph Bottoms; Morgan Woodward
- Music by: Artie Kane
- Country of origin: United States
- Original language: English

Production
- Producer: Larry Rapaport (coordinating producer)
- Production location: Tucson, Arizona
- Cinematography: Ross Maehl
- Editor: Scott Powell
- Running time: 91 minutes
- Production company: CBS Entertainment Production

Original release
- Network: CBS
- Release: January 10, 1992

Related
- Gunsmoke: The Last Apache; Gunsmoke: The Long Ride

Gunsmoke: To the Last Man is a 1992 American Western television film starring James Arness as retired Marshal Matt Dillon. It was directed by Jerry Jameson and based upon the long-running American TV series Gunsmoke (1955 to 1975). It was preceded by Gunsmoke: Return to Dodge (1987), and Gunsmoke: The Last Apache (1990). Subsequent television films are Gunsmoke: The Long Ride (1993), and Gunsmoke: One Man's Justice (1994).

== Plot ==
The film is set in Arizona, sometime after events of the prior television movie, Gunsmoke: The Last Apache, which included the surrender of Apache Chief Geronimo on September 4, 1886. This places it in the latter half of the Pleasant Valley War (1882–1892), a family feud between the Tewksbury and Graham clans, which also involved vigilante ranchers, cowboys, sheepmen, gunmen, lawmen, and innocent civilians that ultimately killed scores of people over a ten-year span.

Matt is now a cattle rancher in the Dragoon Mountains northeast of Tombstone along with his daughter Beth, whose mother "Mike" has just died (after events in "Matt's Love Story"^{S3.E19} wherein Michael Learned portrayed a widowed rancher named Mike Yardner, with whom Matt had a relationship). After the funeral, Matt has an altercation with the villainous Tommy Graham. Having been beaten down, Tommy murders Charlie Tewksbury and rustles Matt's cattle for revenge.

Against her protests, Matt puts Beth on the train to Philadelphia to respect Mike's wish for her to complete a college education. Matt then tracks Tommy Graham's band north towards the Tonto Basin, the area south of Payson, Arizona, where the Pleasant Valley War had its origin.

Along the way, Matt encounters an old acquaintance, Colonel Tucker. Unbeknownst to Matt, Tucker is now the leader of a vigilante faction called the Committee of 50, which carries out lynchings of suspected cattle rustlers and other undesirables. Matt cuts three such innocent victims down from a tree, and hauls them to Payson to report the murders to Sheriff Abel Rose.

Meanwhile, Beth gets off the train and heads out to find Matt. Ranch hand Will McCall and Beth then get caught up in the range war.

== Cast ==
- James Arness as Matt Dillon
- Pat Hingle as Col. Tucker
- Amy Stock-Poynton as Beth Dillon
- Matt Mulhern as Will McCall
- Jason Lively as Rusty Dover
- Joseph Bottoms as Tommy Graham
- Morgan Woodward as Sheriff Abel Rose
- Mills Watson as The Horse Trader
- James Booth as Zack the Preacher
- Amanda Wyss as Lizzie Tewksbury
- Jim Beaver as Deputy Willie Rudd
- Herman Poppe as John Tewksbury
- Ken Swofford as Charlie Tewksbury
- Don Collier as Sheriff Joe (Tombstone)
- Ed Adams as Billy Wilson
- Kathleen Todd Erickson as Mrs. Claire Oliver
- Loy W. Burns as Kirby Tewksbury
- Andy Sherman as Virgil Tucker
- Clark A. Ray as Rowe Blevin
- Michael F. Woodson as Bartender (Payson House)
- Erol Landis as Cole Tucker
- William J. Fisher as Undertaker
- Stephen C. Foster as Luther
- Rick San Nicholas as Tink
- Jimmy Don Cox as Onlooker
- Richard Glover as David Henry

== Reception ==
The film won its time slot with a 14.2/24 rating/share and ranked 28th out of 93 programs airing that week.
