= Gunsmoke: The Last Apache =

1990 TV film

- DVD cover
- Genre: Western
- Written by: Earl W. Wallace
- Directed by: Charles Correll
- Starring: James Arness
- Music by: Bruce Rowland
- Country of origin: United States
- Original language: English

Production
- Executive producer: John Mantley
- Producer: Stanley Hough
- Production locations: Big Bend Ranch State Park, Texas, USA; Alamo Village, Brackettville, Texas, USA; Bill Moody's Rancho Rio Grande, Del Rio, Texas, USA
- Cinematography: Jerry G. Callaway
- Editor: Ray Daniels
- Running time: 94 minutes
- Production company: CBS Entertainment Productions

Original release
- Network: CBS
- Release: March 18, 1990

Related
- Gunsmoke: Return to Dodge; Gunsmoke: To the Last Man

Gunsmoke: The Last Apache is a 1990 American Western television film starring James Arness, based upon the TV series Gunsmoke (1955–1975). It was preceded by Gunsmoke: Return to Dodge (1987). Subsequent television films are Gunsmoke: To the Last Man (1992), Gunsmoke: The Long Ride (1993), and Gunsmoke: One Man's Justice (1994).

== Plot ==
The time of the film is just before the surrender of Apache Chief Geronimo on September 4, 1886, and the setting is in Arizona and Mexico.

Matt has been out prospecting and visits Dan Reilly's store to cash in his gold dust and pick up his mail, which includes a letter from Yardner Cattle Company in Arizona territory. The letter is from "Mike" Yardner (after events in "Matt's Love Story"^{S3.E19} wherein Michael Learned portrayed a widowed rancher with whom Matt had a relationship). Mrs. Yardner urges Matt to return to her ranch if he can.

Along the way Matt is assaulted by a rock-throwing Apache boy named Nachite, and meets a U.S. Cavalry scout Chalk Brighton, who informs him that Geronimo is on the loose, but the real trouble is from the war chief Mandac aka Wolf.

At the Yardner ranch, Matt finds Mike still alive after an attack by Apache warriors, but she tells him that her daughter Beth is in danger. After Beth is captured by Wolf, Mike reveals to Matt that Beth is his daughter. Together they head to the U.S. Cavalry Headquarters in Madera to try and enlist the Army's help to rescue Beth, only to be denied by Gen. Miles. Matt and Mike hatch a scheme to exchange Geronimo's grandsons, Nachite and Kyeta, for Beth.

On their way, Matt and Brighton are waylaid by Colonel Aloysius Felton Bodine and his party of scalp hunters. Mike's sharp-shooting helps them escape Bodine, and they ride out towards Fronteras, Mexico.

Meanwhile, Wolf intends to take Beth as his wife.

== Cast ==
- James Arness as Matt Dillon
- Richard Kiley as Chalk Brighton
- Amy Stock-Poynton as Beth Yardner
- Geoffrey Lewis as Col. Aloysious Felton Bodine
- Joe Lara as Wolf
- Joaquin Martinez as Geronimo
- Sam Vlahos as Tomas
- Hugh O'Brian as Gen. Nelson A. Miles
- Michael Learned as Mike Yardner
- Peter Murnik as Lt. Davis
- Robert Covarrubias as Bartender
- Ned Bellamy as Captain Harris
- Dave Florek as Smiley
- Kevin Sifuentes as Nachite
- Robert Brian Wilson as Corporal
- Blake Boyd as Fraley
- James Milanesa as Sentry Soldier

== Production ==
The film was shot at multiple locations in Texas, including Big Bend Ranch State Park, Alamo Village near Brackettville, and Bill Moody's Rancho Rio Grande near Del Rio. It was dedicated to Amanda Blake, Stan Hough, and writer emeritus, Ron Bishop.

== Reception ==
The film ranked seventh out of the programs airing that week with a 19.7/32 rating/share.
