= Gunsmoke season 19 =

Gunsmoke
- Season 19
- Starring: James Arness; Ken Curtis; Milburn Stone; Amanda Blake; Buck Taylor
- No. of episodes: 24

Release
- Original network: CBS
- Original release: September 10, 1973 – April 1, 1974

Season chronology
- ← Previous; Season 18 Next → Season 20

Gunsmoke is an American Western television series developed by Charles Marquis Warren and based on the radio program of the same name. The series ran for 20 seasons, making it the longest-running Western in television history.

The first episode of season 19 aired in the United States on September 10, 1973, and the final episode aired on April 1, 1974. All episodes were broadcast in the U.S. by CBS.

Season 19 of Gunsmoke was the eighth season of color episodes. Previous seasons were filmed in black-and-white.

== Synopsis ==
Gunsmoke is set in and around Dodge City, Kansas, in the post-Civil War era and centers on United States Marshal Matt Dillon (James Arness) as he enforces law and order in the city. In its original format, the series also focuses on Dillon's friendship with deputy Festus Haggen (Ken Curtis); Doctor Galen "Doc" Adams (Milburn Stone), the town's physician; Kitty Russell (Amanda Blake), saloon girl and later owner of the Long Branch Saloon; and deputy Newly O'Brien (Buck Taylor).

== Cast and characters ==
=== Main ===
- James Arness as Matt Dillon
- Milburn Stone as Doc
- Amanda Blake as Kitty
- Glenn Strange as Sam Noonan
- Ken Curtis as Festus
- Buck Taylor as Newly

== Production ==
Season 19 consisted of 24 one-hour color episodes produced by executive producer John Mantley along with producer Leonard Katzman an associate producer Ron Honthaner.

William Conrad, who was cast as the voice of Matt Dillon in the original Gunsmoke Radio series, provides narration at the beginning of both parts of episode 1 & 2, "Women for Sale" (parts 1 & 2).

== Episodes ==
No. overall	No. in season	Title	Directed by	Written by	Original release date	Prod. code
588	1	"Women for Sale"	Vincent McEveety	Jim Byrnes	September 10, 1973	0607
589	2	"Women for Sale"	Vincent McEveety	Jim Byrnes	September 17, 1973	0607
Matt tracks down white-slave traders led by Timothy Fitzpatrick (James Whitmore) and Comancheros led by Blue Jacket (Gregory Sierra) who abducted young Cynthia Emery (Kathleen Cody) just a few miles from Dodge. On the way to Mexico, he rescues an orphaned girl Marcy McCloud (Dawn Lyn), and saloon gal Stella Silks (Shani Wallis).
590	3	"Matt's Love Story"	Gunnar Hellström	Ron Bishop	September 24, 1973	0609
While tracking renegade Les Dean (Victor French), Matt takes a grazing bullet to the skull causing amnesia. He is found by a young widow, Mike Yardner (Michael Learned), and they fall in love. They must then deal with neighboring rancher, Starcourt (Keith Andes), who will stop at nothing to take Mike's land.
591	4	"The Boy and the Sinner"	Bernard McEveety	Hal Sitowitz	October 1, 1973	0604
Farm boy Colby Eaton (Vincent Van Patten) tries to stop Noah Beal (Ron Moody) from giving up his honor for booze, and to keep Jess Bradman (Ken Lynch) from swindling away Noah's land.
592	5	"The Widow-Maker"	Bernard McEveety	Paul F. Edwards	October 8, 1973	0610
An ex-gunman known as The Widowmaker, Scott Coltrane (Steve Forrest), is unable to put his reputation behind him and settle down with his wife Teresa (Barra Grant). Even after returning from obscurity, other gunslingers like Kid Chama (Randolph Roberts) continue to seek him out, forcing Matt to decide if he will run Coltrane out of Dodge.
593	6	"Kitty's Love Affair"	Vincent McEveety	Story by : Joan E. Gessler & Susan Kotar; Screenplay by : Paul Savage	October 22, 1973	0611
Reformed gunfighter Will Stambridge (Richard Kiley) begins a courtship with Kitty, but he has a $1,000 price on his head from the mother of one of his victims.
594	7	"The Widow and the Rogue"	Bernard McEveety	Story by : Harvey Marlowe and Paul Savage; Screenplay by : Paul Savage	October 29, 1973	0606
Festus takes the charming, unethical petty thief J.J. Honegger (James Stacy) back to Dodge, but must rely on him to protect the widow Martha Cunningham (Beth Brickell) and her son Caleb (Clay O'Brien).
595	8	"A Game of Death...An Act of Love"	Gunnar Hellström	Paul F. Edwards	November 5, 1973	0602
596	9	"A Game of Death...An Act of Love"	Gunnar Hellström	Paul F. Edwards	November 12, 1973	0602
Cattleman Bear Sanderson (Morgan Woodward) seeks vengeance against the Indians he suspects of killing his wife Lavinia Sanderson (Whitney Blake). His daughter Cora Sanderson (Donna Mills), and Matt, eventually convince "back-east" lawyer Cicero Wolfe (Paul Stevens) to defend the alleged renegades when no one else in Kansas will. In part 2, the Indians accused of murdering a cattleman's wife stand trial.
597	10	"Lynch Town"	Bernard McEveety	Story by : Anne Snyder & Joann Carlino; Screenplay by : Calvin Clements, Sr.	November 19, 1973	0601
Alcoholic Judge Warfield (David Wayne) is forced by Matt to hold an inquest into the death of a female saloon-keeper that resulted in the lynching of innocent drifter, Jake Fielder (Ken Swofford). The presence of the drifter's son, Rob Fielder (Mitch Vogel), doesn't make matters any easier for the judge.
598	11	"The Hanging of Newly O'Brien"	Alf Kjellin	Calvin Clements, Sr.	November 26, 1973	0605
A backwoods community led by Kermit (Billy Green Bush) wants to hang Newly for a failed emergency operation he performed on Grandpa (Rusty Lane) to try and save his life.
599	12	"Susan Was Evil"	Bernard McEveety	William Keys	December 3, 1973	0613
Matt asks Nellie (Kathleen Nolan) and her niece Susan (Kathy Cannon) to take care of wounded outlaw Boswell (Art Lund) at a stage coach line house. However for Susan, Boswells arrival ruins her plan to escape to the big city.
600	13	"The Deadly Innocent"	Bernard McEveety	Calvin Clements, Sr.	December 17, 1973	0617
A mentally challenged young man, Billy (Russell Wiggins), struggles to live as an adult. After he attacks Barnett (Charles Dierkop) for cruelty to animals, Billy's fate must be decided by the authorities, with the help of his friend, Festus.
601	14	"The Child Between"	Irving J. Moore	Harry Kronman	December 24, 1973	0612
Newly tries to help care for the sick baby of wanted man Lew Harrod (Sam Groom) and his untrusting Comanche wife Makesha (Alexandra Morgan), who distrusts the medicine of the white man, even to the point of endangering her own tribe.
602	15	"A Family of Killers"	Gunnar Hellström	William Keys	January 14, 1974	0616
Matt and U.S. Marshal Bob Hargraves (Glenn Corbett) team up to hunt a family of particularly sadistic outlaws led by Elton Sutterfield (Anthony Caruso).
603	16	"Like Old Times"	Irving J. Moore	Richard Fielder	January 21, 1974	0619
Reformed safecracker Ben Rando (Nehemiah Persoff) tries to start his life over with his gal Carrie (Gloria DeHaven) after serving a 12-year prison term, only to be tempted yet again to do one last job.
604	17	"The Town Tamers"	Gunnar Hellström	Paul Savage	January 28, 1974	0614
Matt and fellow marshal Luke Rumbaugh (Jim Davis) attempt to bring justice to the frontier town of Hint, but Badger's (Leo Gordon) bunch plan to ambush Luke to get him out of the way permanently.
605	18	"The Foundling"	Bernard McEveety	Jim Byrnes	February 11, 1974	0621
Matt must find a home for Lettie's (Kay Lenz) unwanted baby girl, offering her to Maylee (Bonnie Bartlett) after killing her husband Eli Baines (Don Collier). However, Kitty has already become attached to the baby.
606	19	"The Iron Blood of Courage"	Gunnar Hellström	Ron Bishop	February 18, 1974	0622
Gunfighter William E. Talley (Eric Braeden) is hired by Burdette (Lloyd Bochner) to settle a disagreement over water rights between his homestead clients, and rancher Shaw Anderson (Gene Evans). However, Talley's wife Ellie (Mariette Hartley) and daughter Ronilou have already met and befriended Shaw's Kiowa wife Mignon (Míriam Colón), complicating the inevitable showdown.
607	20	"The Schoolmarm"	Bernard McEveety	Dick Nelson	February 25, 1974	0623
Unmarried schoolteacher Sara Merkle (Charlotte Stewart) is told by Doc that she is pregnant, after being raped by Jack Stokes (Scott Walker). Her trouble escalates even further when her admirer Carl Pruitt (Lin McCarthy) tries to help.
608	21	"Trail of Bloodshed"	Bernard McEveety	Story by : Earl W. Wallace; Screenplay by : Paul Savage	March 4, 1974	0615
Young farmer Buck Henry (Kurt Russell) sets out to find the man who killed his father John Woolfe (Larry Pennell), his own renegade uncle, Rance Woolfe (Tom Simcox). Festus and Buck Henry's gal, Joanie Brodie (Janet Baldwin) also get involved in the hunt.
609	22	"Cowtown Hustler"	Gunnar Hellström	Jim Byrnes	March 11, 1974	0618
Has-been pool player Moses Darby (Jack Albertson) looks for a way to regain others' respect. Dave Rope (Jonathan Goldsmith Lippe), promising his gal Sally (Nellie Bellflower) that he will "hit it big", convinces Darby that he will be back on top if they partner-up and hustle his skill in Dodge against Willie Tomsen (John Davis Chandler).
610	23	"To Ride a Yeller Horse"	Vincent McEveety	Calvin Clements, Sr.	March 18, 1974	0624
Scheming mother Mrs. Shepherd (Louise Latham) will stop at nothing to fulfill her own dreams for her daughter Anna May (Kathleen Cody) and son Chester (Thomas Leopold), even to the point of provoking a dangerous confrontation between Anna's admirer Newly, and the ranch hand Orlo. And yet, memories of one who rode a yellow horse still haunts Mrs. Shepherd's mind.
611	24	"The Disciple"	Gunnar Hellström	Shimon Wincelberg	April 1, 1974	0620
Matt's life is changed during a bank robbery after his gun arm is seriously wounded. As the outlaws are gunning for him, he finds unlikely help from Lem Rawlins (Dennis Redfield), a conscientious objector army deserter. (Amanda Blake's final appearance of the series. She returned for the TV film Return to Dodge)

== Release ==
=== Broadcast ===
Season nineteen aired Mondays at 8:00-9:00 pm (EST) on CBS.

=== Home media ===
The nineteenth season was released on DVD by Paramount Home Entertainment on February 4, 2020.

== Reception ==
Gunsmoke season 19 dropped to #15 in the Nielsen ratings.
