= Artie Kane =

American composer (1929–2022)

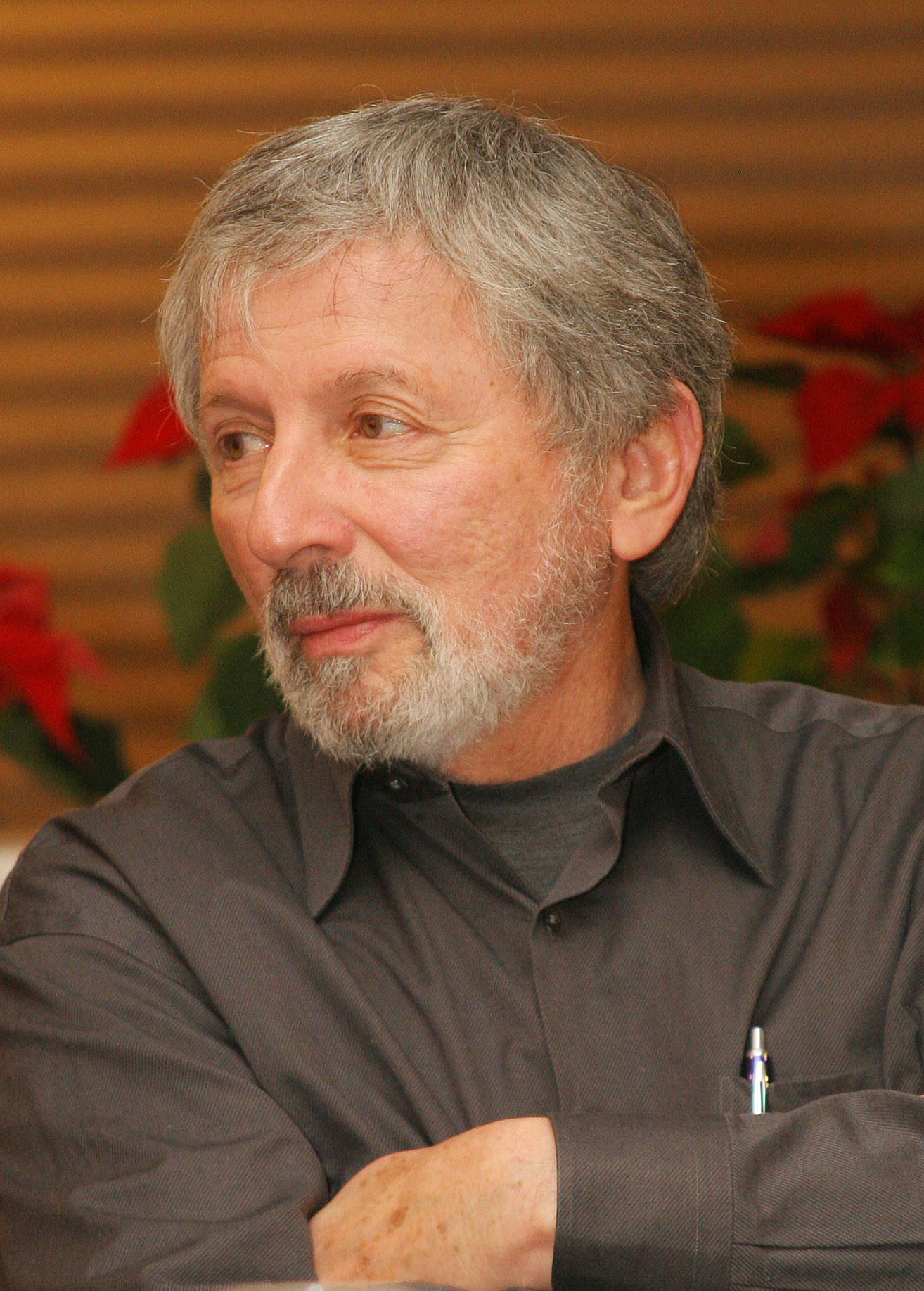
- Kane in 2006

Background information
- Also known as: Artie Kane
- Born: Aaron Cohen; April 14, 1929; Columbus, Ohio, U.S.
- Died: June 21, 2022 (aged 93) Whidbey Island, Washington, U.S.
- Genres: Film score, jazz, pop
- Occupations: Pianist, film composer, conductor, author
- Instrument: Keyboards
- Years active: 1944–2004
- Labels: RCA Victor, Angel

Artie Kane (born Aaron Cohen; April 14, 1929 – June 21, 2022) was an American pianist, film score composer, and conductor with a career spanning over six decades.

As a pianist in Hollywood studios, Kane worked with artists such as Frank Sinatra, Henry Mancini, John Williams, and Quincy Jones.

He composed the music for over 250 television shows. Some of his works for television include Wonder Woman, Vegas, Hotel, Dynasty, Matlock, A Question of Guilt, and Man Against the Mob. Kane also composed the film scores for five motion pictures including The Bat People, Looking for Mr. Goodbar, Eyes of Laura Mars, Night of the Juggler, and Wrong Is Right.

During his career, he conducted on over 60 motion pictures at MGM, Disney, Universal, Fox, Warner Brothers, Sony, Columbia Pictures, and Paramount.

In 1976, Kane was nominated for a Grammy Award along with Ralph Grierson for a two-piano George Gershwin Album, 'S Wonderful on Angel Records. He was inducted into the Columbus Senior Musicians Hall of Fame in 1998 and is a co-author of the book, Music to My Years: Love and Life Between the Notes.

== Biography ==
=== Early life ===
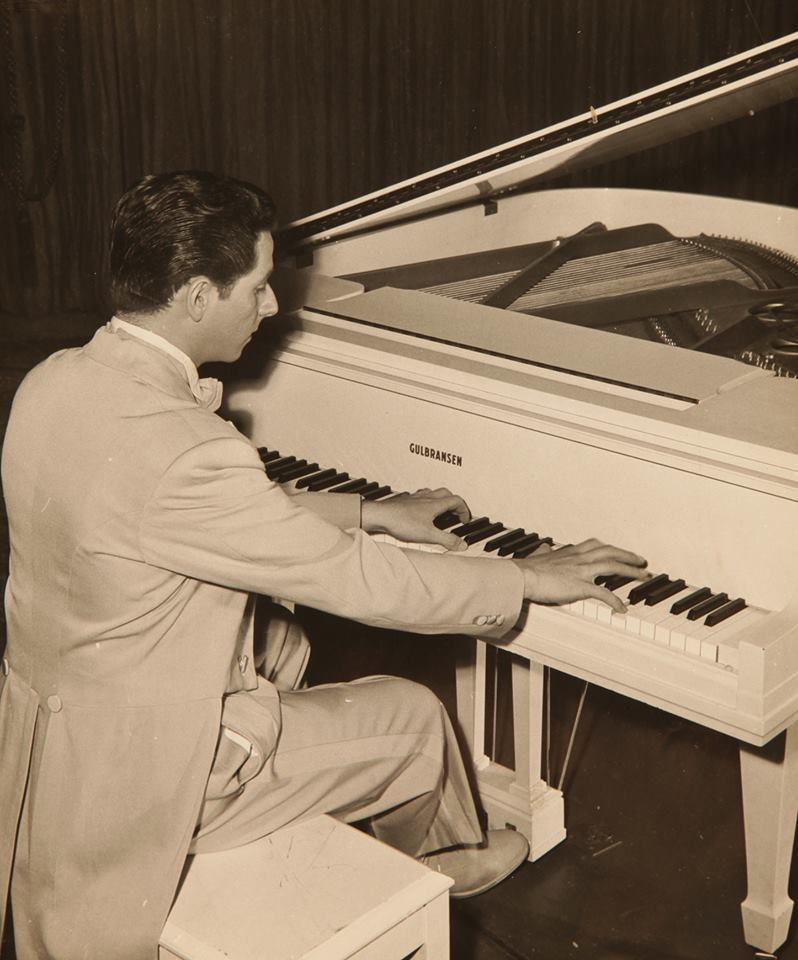
Artie Kane playing Rhapsody in Blue for Holiday On Ice in 1954

Kane was born in Columbus, Ohio in 1929. His family was Jewish. His mother, Sarah Berman, emigrated from Belarus in 1914. His father, Nathan Cohen, whose family members were Russian musicians, immigrated to the United States from Russia. Nathan served two years in the U.S. Army in France during WWI. Kane's parents married in 1924 in Columbus. Kane's father died a week before his third birthday. He was raised by his mother and uncle, Joe Berman, whom Kane credited for inspiring him to become a musician.

Kane took to the piano at the age of three and was considered a child prodigy. At four, he won first prize in a statewide contest, competing with children of seven and eight. At 10, he studied under Agnes Wright and went to New York once a year to play for Prof. Alexander Siloti, Rachmaninoff's teacher who advised Kane as to his next season's study.

In 1938, Kane won a scholarship to The Columbus Boychoir School where he first sang alto, and within a year became an accompanist and featured performer until 1947. He later studied piano at the Cincinnati Conservatory of Music. In 1943, after a performance at Town Hall in New York City, he received a scholarship to study classical piano with Djane Lavoie-Herz in Manhattan.

In 1944, Kane returned to Columbus and attended South High School, played in Snook Neal's band and was hired by radio station WBNS where he played daily radio segments of classical piano, plus his own arrangements of popular music.

In 1947 at eighteen years old, he was hired as a pianist in the band at Club Gloria in Columbus, Ohio with comedian Harry Jarkey. From the radio work and write-ups in local newspapers, the conductor Izler Solomon invited Kane to play Gershwin's Rhapsody in Blue for a Pops concert with the Columbus Philharmonic Orchestra.

On October 19, 1948, Kane changed his name from Aaron Cohen to Artie Kane on the advice of Matt Gilbert, a cartoonist for The Cleveland Plain Dealer who suggested it as a more distinctive stage name. His mother Sarah Cohen also changed her name from Sarah B. Cohen to Sally B. Kane.

=== Holiday on Ice ===
In 1949, Artie Kane went to Toledo, Ohio, to audition as pianist for Holiday On Ice and was hired based on his reputation. He spent eight years on the road as rehearsal pianist and pianist/conductor for the company.

From 1953 to 1956, Kane was the rehearsal and show pianist for Norwegian figure skater and Olympic medalist Sonja Henie during the European Holiday On Ice Tour. He also appeared in NBC's first color television spectacular, Sonja Henie’s Holiday on Ice on December 22, 1956.

=== New York ===
In 1956, Kane left the ice show and went to New York City working as a Broadway rehearsal and audition pianist and playing nightclubs. He was hired as pianist and assistant conductor at the Roxy Theatre, for the Roxy Orchestra under conductor Robert Boucher, playing and conducting four shows a day, seven days a week for two years. His work is included on the Bob Boucher's orchestra LP record Sightseeing in Sound with a solo opening of ragtime piano.

Prior to the Roxy's closing, Kane was offered a job as Jaye P. Morgan's on-the-road conductor and pianist. Kane conducted for her in night clubs, at personal appearances, and recording sessions and they lived together on the Upper East Side of Manhattan in New York City.

=== Hollywood ===
Kane and Morgan married on July 31, 1960, and they settled in Los Angeles. In Hollywood, he renewed an acquaintance with Dominic Frontiere, a composer in LA whom he had met in New York. Frontiere, in turn, opened doors for him to join the musicians' Local 47 and hired him to play for the TV series The New Breed. Frontiere also hired Kane throughout the sixties as he composed music for producer Leslie Stevens’ weekly television shows, including Outer Limits and Quinn Martin Productions’ The Fugitive.

==== Session Keyboardist ====
In 1960, Frontiere introduced Kane to a contractor at MGM, who was looking for a pianist to work at that studio. As a pianist he worked with composers such as Alex North on the film, The Outrage (1964), Jerry Goldsmith on Planet of the Apes (1967) and The Illustrated Man (1969), Fred Karlin on Westworld (1973), Jerry Fielding on The Outfit (1973), and Elmer Bernstein on McQ (1974).

In 1966, Nelson Riddle, the arranger and conductor for Frank Sinatra's future Billboard #1 and Grammy Award-winning album Strangers in the Night, asked Kane to play the Hammond organ on the album. Nine months earlier as a studio pianist, Kane played a pop-rock organ on Nelson's score for a car-race film called Red Line 7000 and Nelson was looking for a similar sound for the Sinatra album. Eight months later in December, Kane appeared on the subsequent television special, A Man and His Music – Part II.

Between 1968 and 1969, French composer Michel Legrand hired Kane as a pianist for the films Ice Station Zebra, The Thomas Crown Affair, and The Happy Ending, directed by Richard Brooks.

In 1972, Kane was brought to RCA's attention by composer, conductor, and pianist Henry Mancini who was impressed by Kane's work with Ray Brown on bass and Shelly Manne on drums for Henry's film score, Me, Natalie. Later that year, Mancini personally produced and arranged the music for the trio called, Artie Kane Plays Organ!

In 1975, towards the end of his career as a session musician, Artie distinguished himself by joining with another respected session pianist, Ralph Grierson, to release a two-piano Gershwin album called 'S Wonderful. The album included rare, out-of-print and never-before-recorded songs published in the 1930s and '40s, as well as An American in Paris, Three Preludes, and six 'classic' Gershwin show tunes. The album was nominated for a Grammy in 1976.

For sixteen years Kane worked as a session keyboardist for Fox, MGM, Warner Music, and Universal on movies, television, film, and television variety shows before starting his composing career.

==== Composer ====
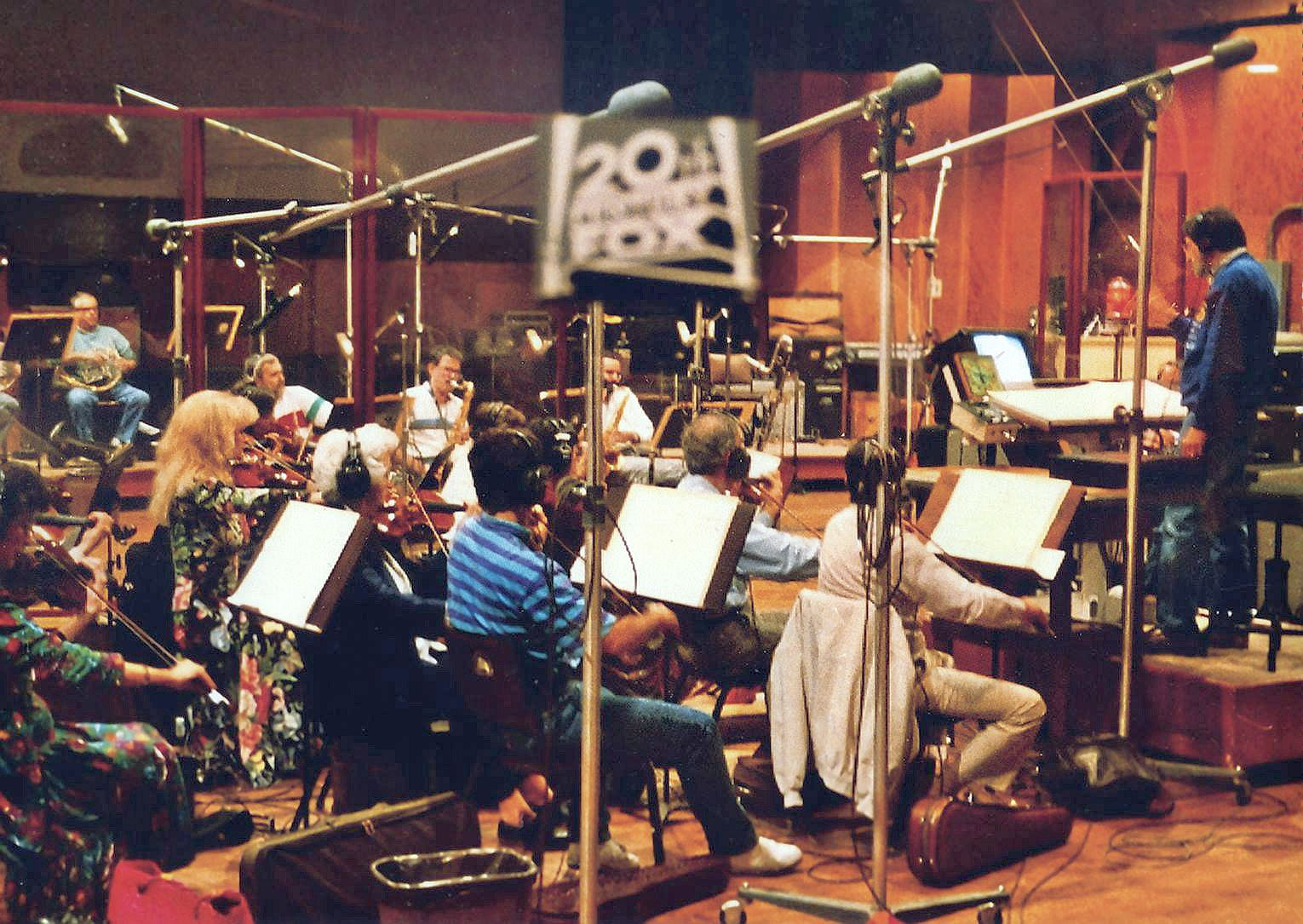
Artie Kane conducting a recording session at 20th Century Fox

With twelve years of training, playing piano for film scores, Kane decided to pursue a career as a film composer. Kane studied with teachers Mario Castelnuovo-Tedesco, a faculty member and teacher of film music at the Los Angeles Conservatory of Music and Dr. Albert Harris. Harris helped Kane refine his skills and in 1974, Kane was given a chance to compose and orchestrate the music for a horror film known by several titles: It Lives by Night, The Bat People, and It’s Alive.

In 1977, when composer Dave Grusin was unavailable for Richard Brooks' film, Looking for Mr. Goodbar, Alan Bergman, the lyricist, suggested Kane compose the score for the Academy Award nominated film starring Diane Keaton and Richard Gere.

In 1978, Columbia Pictures offered Kane the film Eyes of Laura Mars, a Faye Dunaway and Tommy Lee Jones thriller. It was the first film for producer Jon Peters. Kane composed and conducted the score and worked with Barbra Streisand who performed the hit love theme from the movie, Prisoner.

When producer Douglas S. Cramer became head of production at Spelling Productions, he took Kane with him. Kane rotated with other composers scoring Love Boat and Vegas for the Spelling lineup. While working on his first Love Boat assignment, Kane heard from a producer at Lorimar about scoring a movie-for-television directed by Robert Butler and starring Tuesday Weld titled A Question of Guilt in 1978.

In 1980, when Kane finished scoring an action thriller film called, Night of the Juggler for Columbia Pictures, Richard Brooks, the director Kane worked for on Looking for Mr. Goodbar, asked him to score his new film, the comedy thriller Wrong is Right starring Katharine Ross and Sean Connery.

In 1987, after scoring a few episodes of crime drama Jake and the Fatman, Kane became one of a rotating group of composers on a popular spinoff show called Matlock, starring Andy Griffith. Kane composed 56 episodes of the series over six years and won four BMI TV Music Awards for his work.

Between 1976 1990, Kane's television credits include the music for 31 episodes of the action series, Wonder Woman, 56 episodes of the sitcom Love Boat, 18 episodes of the soap opera Dynasty, ten episodes of the detective series Vega$, and 11 episodes of crime drama Wolf. His credits also include three two-hour Gunsmoke television movies, Gunsmoke: To the Last Man (1992), Gunsmoke: The Long Ride (1993), and Gunsmoke: One Man's Justice.

==== Conductor ====
In 1992, Kane received a surprise offer to conduct for composer Marc Shaiman on his scores for the films A Few Good Men and Sister Act which launched his third career as a conductor.

One of Kane's more memorable experiences as a conductor was in March 1993. He received a phone call from the conductor John Williams to stand in for him for a few sessions as conductor for the Steven Spielberg film, Jurassic Park. With little preparation and with Kane's friend and Williams' music editor Ken Wannberg, Kane sight-read the score and recorded it with a 106-piece orchestra.

Kane conducted more than sixty film scores for composers such as Marc Shaiman, James Newton Howard, Danny Elfman, Michael Convertino, Steve Porcaro, and John Frizzell in various recording studios around the world. He conducted a film score for James Newton Howard's 1995 film Restoration in the famed studio, Air Lyndhurst in Hampstead, London. He also conducted James Newton Howard's score for the film Outbreak at Todd-AO Scoring Stage and other studios such as George Lucas’ Skywalker Ranch, TTG Studios, Sony Studios, 20th Century Fox, and Warner Bros.

== Personal life ==
Kane married eight times. His first marriage, in 1948, was to the dancer Joy Holly. He met Holly while touring with Harry Jarkey at the Wenona Beach Casino at Bay City, Michigan. The couple separated in 1950 and divorced on August 2, 1951.

Kane's second marriage was to Jinx Clark, a fellow cast member and star of Holiday on Ice. They married in 1951 after the European Holiday on Ice Tour. After Kane returned from the army with an honorable medical discharge in 1953, their marriage ended and they were divorced on May 19, 1954.

Kane's third marriage was to skater Jeanne Cheadle, a member of the cast of Holiday on Ice, in 1955. This was one of Kane's shortest marriages and lasted less than a year. The couple divorced on December 12, 1955.

Kane's fourth marriage was to another skater and cast member of Holiday on Ice, Sherry Wells in 1956. Kane had his first son, David born in 1957. The couple divorced on January 29, 1959. Wells remarried and changed David's last name to Russell. David Russell is a retired executive and basketball coach. Kane has two grandsons from David, Bryson Russell and Coleman Russell.

His fifth marriage was to singer and actress Jaye P. Morgan. Kane was Morgan's pianist and conductor during their marriage. They adopted Kane's second son, Paul Steven Kane in 1963. The couple divorced in 1966.

In 1967, he married his sixth wife, Sara Jane Tallman Grusin, a studio singer in Los Angeles. Kane and Grusin had a son, Adam Kane, born in 1968. Adam is a film director in the Hollywood film studios. Kane and Grusin divorced on September 15, 1970, after three years of marriage.

Kane met his seventh wife, Carol Faith, through his friend, Charles Fox, while scoring at Warner Brothers. Faith was Fox's agent. They married in 1976 and divorced on June 4, 1979.

In 1981, Kane married JoAnn Johnson, a music copyist. They had been married more than thirty-six years and resided on Whidbey Island in Washington state.

Kane died on June 21, 2022, at his home in Whidbey Island at the age of 93.

== Awards and honors ==
In 1976, Kane was nominated for a Grammy Award along with Ralph Grierson for a two-piano Gershwin Album, 'S Wonderful on Angel Records. He was given a BMI Sterling Circle Award for 25 years affiliation in 1993. In 1998, he was inducted into the Columbus Senior Musicians Hall of Fame in Columbus, Ohio.

Kane also received seven BMI TV Music Awards for his television work:

List of television awards
Year	Award	Series	Notes
1985	BMI TV Music Award	Hotel (1983)	
1985	BMI TV Music Award	Dynasty (1981)	
1986	BMI TV Music Award	Dynasty (1981)	
1988	BMI TV Music Award	Matlock (1986)	Shared with Bruce Babcock, Don Davis
1989	BMI TV Music Award	Matlock (1986)	Shared with Bruce Babcock
1990	BMI TV Music Award	Matlock (1986)	Shared with Bruce Babcock
1991	BMI TV Music Award	Matlock (1986)	Shared with Bruce Babcock

== Filmography ==
=== Television ===
Year	Title	Format	Network	Notes
1969	The Ghost & Mrs. Muir	TV series	NBC	1 episode, segment (20.11.69) scored by Artie Kane
1971	Nanny and the Professor	TV series	20th Century-Fox Television	1 episode, segment (13.09.71) scored by Artie Kane
1974	The Rockford Files	TV series	NBC	2 episodes, Artie Kane with Dick De Benedictis (composer)
1974	Barnaby Jones	TV series	CBS	1 episode, Artie Kane with Duane Tatro (composers)
1976	Wonder Woman	TV series	ABC, CBS	31 episodes, Artie Kane with Charles Fox, Robert Prince (composers)
1978	The Love Boat	TV series	ABC	56 episodes, Artie Kane composer
1978	The New Love Boat	TV series	ABC	Charles Fox, (additional) Artie Kane (composer)
1978	Lou Grant	TV series	CBS	1 episode, Patrick Williams, Artie Kane, Miles Goodman, Med Flory, Michael Melvoin, Shirley Walker (composers)
1978	A Question of Guilt	TV movie		Artie Kane (composer)
1979	Vega$	TV series	ABC	10 episodes, Artie Kane, J. J. Johnson, John Davis, John Beal (composers)
1979	Young Love, First Love	TV movie		The First Time is This Time by Carol Connors, Artie Kane, performed by Valerie Bertinelli (songs)
1980	Murder Can Hurt You	TV movie	ABC	Artie Kane (composer)
1982	Matt Houston	TV series	ABC	7 episodes, Dominic Frontiere, John Davis, Ken Harrison, Nelson Riddle, Artie Kane (composers)
1982	Million Dollar Infield	TV movie	CBS	Artie Kane (composer)
1983	Dynasty	TV series	ABC	18 episodes, Artie Kane (composer)
1983	Hotel	TV series	ABC	39 episodes, Artie Kane (composer)
1984	Finder of Lost Loves	TV series	ABC	Artie Kane (composer)
1984	Concrete Beat	TV movie		Artie Kane (composer)
1986	Long Time Gone	TV movie		Artie Kane (composer)
1987	Matlock	TV series	ABC	65 episodes, Artie Kane Dick DeBenedictis, John Cacavas, Bruce Babcock (composers)
1987	Jake and the Fatman	TV series	CBS	3 episodes, Artie Kane, Morton Steven, Bruce Babcock, Steve Bramson (composers)
1988	Divided We Stand	TV movie		Artie Kane (composer)
1988	The Red Spider	TV movie		Artie Kane (composer)
1988	Man Against the Mob	TV movie	NBC	Artie Kane (composer)
1989	Wolf	TV series	CBS	11 episodes, Artie Kane (composer)
1989	Man Against the Mob: The Chinatown Murders	TV movie	NBC	Artie Kane (composer)
1989	Fire and Rain	TV movie	USA Network	Artie Kane (composer)
1989	Terror on Highway 91	TV movie		Artie Kane (composer)
1992	Gunsmoke: To the Last Man	TV movie	CBS	Artie Kane (composer)
1993	Gunsmoke: The Long Ride	TV movie	CBS	Artie Kane (composer)
1994	Gunsmoke: One Man's Justice	TV movie	CBS	Artie Kane (composer)

=== Film ===
==== As Composer ====
List of credits as composer
Year	Title	Director	Studio
1974	The Bat People	Jerry Jameson	American International Pictures
1977	Looking for Mr. Goodbar	Richard Brooks	Paramount Pictures
1978	Eyes of Laura Mars	Irvin Kershner	Columbia Pictures
1980	Night of the Juggler	Robert Butler	Columbia Pictures
1982	Wrong Is Right	Richard Brooks	Columbia Pictures

==== As Conductor ====
List of credits as conductor
Year	Title	Director	Composer	Studio
1991	The Doctor	Randa Haines	Michael Convertino	Buena Vista Pictures
1992	A Few Good Men	Rob Reiner	Marc Shaiman	Columbia Pictures
1992	Mr. Saturday Night	Billy Crystal	Marc Shaiman	Columbia Pictures
1992	Sister Act	Emile Ardolino	Marc Shaiman	Buena Vista Pictures
1992	Freejack	Geoff Murphy	Trevor Jones	Warner Bros.
1993	Wrestling Ernest Hemingway	Randa Haines	Michael Convertino	Warner Bros.
1993	Addams Family Values	Barry Sonnenfeld	Marc Shaiman	Paramount Pictures
1993	A Home of Our Own	Tony Bill	Michael Convertino	Gramercy Pictures
1993	Heart and Souls	Ron Underwood	Marc Shaiman	Universal Pictures
1993	Jurassic Park	Steven Spielberg	John Williams	Universal Pictures
1994	Speechless	Ron Underwood	Marc Shaiman	Metro-Goldwyn-Mayer
1994	Junior	Ivan Reitman	James Newton Howard	Universal Pictures
1994	The Santa Clause	John Pasquin	Michael Convertino	Buena Vista Pictures
1994	Milk Money	Richard Benjamin	Michael Convertino	Paramount Pictures
1994	North	Rob Reiner	Marc Shaiman	Columbia Pictures
1994	City Slickers II: The Legend of Curly's Gold	Paul Weiland	Marc Shaiman	Columbia Pictures
1995	The American President	Rob Reiner	Marc Shaiman	Columbia Pictures
1995	Waterworld	Kevin Reynolds	James Newton Howard	Universal Pictures
1995	Forget Paris	Billy Crystal	Marc Shaiman	Columbia Pictures
1995	French Kiss	Lawrence Kasdan	James Newton Howard	20th Century Fox
1995	Things to Do in Denver When You're Dead	Gary Fleder	Michael Convertino	Miramax
1995	Stuart Saves His Family	Harold Ramis	Marc Shaiman	Paramount Pictures
1995	Outbreak	Wolfgang Petersen	James Newton Howard	Warner Bros.
1995	Just Cause	Arne Glimcher	James Newton Howard	Warner Bros.
1995	Eye for an Eye	John Schlesinger	James Newton Howard	Paramount Pictures
1996	Restoration	Michael Hoffman	James Newton Howard	Miramax
1996	Ghosts of Mississippi	Rob Reiner	Marc Shaiman	Columbia Pictures
1996	One Fine Day	Michael Hoffman	James Newton Howard	20th Century Fox
1996	Mars Attacks!	Tim Burton	Danny Elfman	Warner Bros.
1996	Space Jam	Joe Pytka	James Newton Howard	Warner. Bros.
1996	Extreme Measures	Michael Apted	Danny Elfman	Columbia Pictures
1996	The First Wives Club	Hugh Wilson	Marc Shaiman	Paramount Pictures
1996	The Rich Man's Wife	Amy Holden Jones	James Newton Howard	Buena Vista Pictures
1996	Mother	Albert Brooks	Marc Shaiman	Paramount Pictures
1996	Bogus	Norman Jewison	Marc Shaiman	Warner Bros.
1996	The Trigger Effect	David Koepp	James Newton Howard	Gramercy Pictures
1996	Mother Night	Keith Gordon	Michael Convertino	Fine Line Features
1996	Mission: Impossible	Brian De Palma	Danny Elfman	Paramount Pictures
1996	Primal Fear	Gregory Hoblit	James Newton Howard	Paramount Pictures
1996	The Juror	Brian Gibson	James Newton Howard	Columbia Pictures
1996	Bed of Roses	Michael Goldenberg	Michael Convertino	New Line Cinema
1996	The Last of the High Kings	David Keating	Michael Convertino	Miramax
1996	The Frighteners	Peter Jackson	Danny Elfman	Universal Pictures
1997	The Postman	Kevin Costner	James Newton Howard	Warner Bros.
1997	Good Will Hunting	Gus Van Sant	Danny Elfman	Miramax Films
1997	Flubber	Les Mayfield	Danny Elfman	Buena Vista Pictures
1997	Alien: Resurrection	Jean-Pierre Jeunet	John Frizzell	20th Century Fox
1997	The Devil's Advocate	Taylor Hackford	James Newton Howard	20th Century Fox
1997	In & Out	Frank Oz	Marc Shaiman	Paramount Films
1997	George of the Jungle	Sam Weisman	Marc Shaiman	Buena Vista Pictures
1997	Men in Black	Barry Sonnenfeld	Danny Elfman	Columbia Pictures
1997	My Best Friend's Wedding	P. J. Hogan	James Newton Howard	TriStar Pictures
1997	Father's Day	Ivan Reitman	James Newton Howard	Warner Bros.
1997	Dante's Peak	Roger Donaldson	James Newton Howard	Universal Pictures
1997	Metro	Thomas Carter	Steve Porcaro	Buena Vista Pictures
1997	Jungle 2 Jungle	John Pasquin	Michael Convertino	Buena Vista Pictures
1998	A Civil Action	Steven Zaillian	Danny Elfman	Buena Vista Pictures
1998	A Simple Plan	Sam Raimi	Danny Elfman	Paramount Pictures
1998	Simon Birch	Mark Steven Johnson	Marc Shaiman	Buena Vista Pictures
1998	Dance with Me	Randa Haines	Michael Convertino	Columbia Pictures
1998	Mafia!	Jim Abrahams	John Frizzell	Buena Vista Pictures
1998	A Perfect Murder	Andrew Davis	James Newton Howard	Warner Bros.
1998	My Giant	Michael Lehmann	Marc Shaiman	Columbia Pictures
1999	Snow Falling on Cedars	Scott Hicks	James Newton Howard	Universal Pictures

==== As Pianist ====
List of credits as pianist
Year	Title	Director	Composer	Studio
1964	The Outrage	Martin Ritt	Alex North	Metro-Goldwyn-Mayer
1967	Planet of the Apes	Franklin J. Schaffner	Jerry Goldsmith	20th Century Fox
1969	The Illustrated Man	Jack Smight	Jerry Goldsmith	Warner Bros.
1969	The Happy Ending	Richard Brooks	Michel Legrand	United Artists
1971	Escape from the Planet of the Apes	Don Taylor	Jerry Goldsmith	20th Century Fox
1973	Westworld	Michael Crichton	Fred Karlin	Metro-Goldwyn-Mayer
1973	The Outfit	John Flynn	Jerry Fielding	Metro-Goldwyn-Mayer
1974	McQ	John Sturges	Elmer Bernstein	Warner Bros.

== Discography ==
List of albums and soundtracks
Year	Album	Artist	Credit	Label
1961	Blues Cross Country	Peggy Lee	Organ	Capitol Studios
1964	Viva Las Vegas	Elvis Presley	Piano	RCA Victor
1965	The Sandpiper	Johnny Mandel	Piano	Mercury Records
1968	Charly (Original Soundtrack Recording)	Ravi Shankar	Piano - Harpsichord	World Pacific
1969	Bud Shank Plays The Music And Arrangements Of Michel LeGrand – Windmills Of Your Mind	Bud Shank	Organ	Pacific Jazz Records
1970	Nilsson by Tipton	George Tipton	Piano	Warner Bros. Records
1971	Dollar$ (soundtrack)	Quincy Jones	Keyboards	Reprise Records
1972	Honky Tonk Train	Artie Kane	Primary Artist	RCA Victor
1972	Henry Mancini Presents: Artie Kane Playing The Swinging Screen Scene	Artie Kane	Primary Artist - Organ	RCA Victor
1972	Henry Mancini Presents: Artie Kane at the Organ: The Best of the Big Hits	Artie Kane	Primary Artist - Organ	RCA Victor
1975	Great Waldo Pepper [Original Soundtrack]	Henry Mancini	Piano	MCA Records
1975	Mirrors	Peggy Lee	Keyboards	A&M Studios
1976	Can't Hide Love	Carmen McRae	Piano	A&M Studios
1978	Acting Up	Marlena Shaw	Composer	Columbia Records
1978	Songbird	Barbra Streisand	Conductor	CBS
1979	Apple Dimple	Toots Thielemans	Composer	Nippon Columbia Co., Ltd.
1991	For the Boys	Bette Midler	Conductor - Musician	Capitol Studios
1991	Mobsters	Michael Small	Conductor	Twentieth Century Fox
1992	A Few Good Men	Marc Shaiman	Conductor	Columbia Records
1992	Sister Act	Marc Shaiman	Conductor	Hollywood Records
1993	Bodies, Rest & Motion	Michael Convertino	Conductor	Sony Music
1993	Heart and Souls	Marc Shaiman	Conductor - Performer	MCA Records
1993	Demolition Man (The Original Orchestral Score)	Elliot Goldenthal	Conductor	Varese Sarabande
1994	Addams Family Values	Marc Shaiman	Conductor - Primary Artist	Varèse Sarabande
1994	City Slickers II: The Legend of Curly's Gold	Marc Shaiman	Conductor	Sony Music
1994	North	Marc Shaiman	Conductor	Epic Records
1994	Wrestling Ernest Hemingway	Michael Convertino	Conductor	Mercury Records
1995	Forget Paris	Marc Shaiman	Conductor	Elektra Records
1995	Golden Classics	Marlena Shaw	Composer	Collectables
1995	The American President	Marc Shaiman	Conductor	MCA Soundtracks
1995	The Best of Carmen McRae	Carmen McRae	Piano	Blue Note Records
1995	Waterworld	James Newton Howard	Conductor	MCA Soundtracks
1996	Bed of Roses	Michael Convertino	Conductor	Milan Records
1996	Danny Elfman: Music for a Darkened Theatre	Danny Elfman	Conductor	Geffen
1996	Mission: Impossible	Danny Elfman	Conductor	Point Music
1996	Mission: Impossible [Music from and Inspired by the Motion Picture]	Danny Elfman	Conductor	Island
1996	Mother Night	Michael Convertino	Conductor	Varese Sarabande
1996	Mother	Marc Shaiman	Conductor	Hollywood Records
1996	One Fine Day	James Newton Howard	Conductor	Sony Music
1996	Primal Fear	James Newton Howard	Conductor	Milan
1996	Restoration	James Newton Howard	Conductor	Milan
1996	The First Wives Club	Marc Shaiman	Conductor	Varese Sarabande
1996	The Frighteners	Danny Elfman	Conductor	Universal Pictures
1997	Alien Resurrection]	John Frizzell	Conductor	RCA Victor
1997	Dante's Peak	John Frizzell	Conductor	Varese Sarabande
1997	Flubber [Original Score]	Danny Elfman	Conductor	Walt Disney Records
1997	Ghosts of Mississippi	Marc Shaiman	Conductor	Sony Music
1997	In & Out	Various Artists	Conductor	Motown
1997	Looking for Mr. Goodbar	Various Artists	Composer	Columbia Records
1997	Mars Attacks!	Danny Elfman	Conductor	Atlantic Records
1997	Men in Black	Danny Elfman	Conductor	Sony Music
1997	Move Over Darling	Doris Day	Piano	Bear Family
1997	My Best Friend's Wedding [Original Soundtrack]	James Newton Howard	Conductor	Columbia Records
1997	Space Jam [Original Score]	James Newton Howard	Conductor	Atlantic
1997	The Devil's Advocate [Original Score]	James Newton Howard	Conductor	TVT Soundtrax
1997	The Postman [Original Score/Soundtrack]	James Newton Howard	Conductor	Miramax Records
1998	A Civil Action	Danny Elfman	Conductor	Hollywood Records
1998	A Perfect Murder	James Newton Howard	Conductor	Varèse Sarabande
1998	George of the Jungle	Marc Shaiman	Conductor	Walt Disney Records
1998	Simon Birch	Marc Shaiman	Conductor	Epic
1999	A Simple Plan [Original Score]	Danny Elfman	Conductor	Chapter III Records
1999	Blue Bossa, Vol. 2	Various Artists	Piano	Blue Note
1999	Snow Falling on Cedars	James Newton Howard	Conductor	Decca U.S.
2000	Brain in a Box: The Science Fiction Collection	Various Artists	Primary Artist	Rhino
2000	Films of the Century	Various Artists	Conductor	Milan Records
2001	Memories	Marlena Shaw	Composer	Collectables
2002	Live in Tokyo	Marlena Shaw	Composer	441 Records
2002	Paramount Pictures 90th Anniversary: Memorable Scores	Various Artists	Conductor - Primary Artist	Sony Masterworks
2002	The Blue Box Blue Note's Best	Various Artists	Piano	EMI
2004	Chiller Cabinet	Various Artists	Conductor - Composer	Obsessive

== See also ==
- List of film score composers
- List of keyboardists
- List of music arrangers
