= Gunsmoke: One Man's Justice =

1994 TV film

- DVD cover
- Genre: Western
- Written by: Harry Longstreet; Renee Longstreet
- Directed by: Jerry Jameson
- Starring: James Arness; Bruce Boxleitner; Amy Stock-Poynton; Alan Scarfe; Christopher Bradley; Mikey LeBeau
- Music by: Artie Kane
- Country of origin: United States
- Original language: English

Production
- Executive producer: James Arness
- Producers: Jerry Jameson; Norman S. Powell
- Production locations: Tucson, Arizona, U.S.A.
- Cinematography: Ross A. Maehl
- Editor: Scott Powell
- Running time: 92 minutes
- Production company: CBS Entertainment Productions

Original release
- Network: CBS
- Release: February 10, 1994

Related
- Gunsmoke: The Long Ride

Gunsmoke: One Man's Justice is a 1994 American Western television film based on the Gunsmoke TV series (1955–1975) starring James Arness. It is the fifth and final film, preceded by Gunsmoke: Return to Dodge (1987), Gunsmoke: The Last Apache (1990), Gunsmoke: To the Last Man (1992), and Gunsmoke: The Long Ride (1993).

== Plot ==
After robbing a train of $30,000, Irish outlaw Sean Devlin and his bandits interrupt their get-away to rob a stagecoach. While defending the coach, Matt's son-in-law Josh is shot in the leg, a traveling barbed wire salesman Davis Healy is hit in the arm, and a widowed mother of two, Hannah Miller, is mortally wounded. Three passing cowboys intercede and chase the Devlin gang off. The stage stops at Dillon's ranch to help the wounded since it is closer than town.

Hannah dies at Matt's ranch house. Her eldest boy Lucas (age 15) sneaks away in the middle of the night to seek revenge with his father's gun belt and deputy's badge. In the morning, Matt heads out after the boy to try to keep him from being killed. Healy, despite his wound, insists on joining the pursuit, causing Matt to question Healy's motives.

Meanwhile back on the ranch, the younger orphaned boy Martin has been left in Beth's care, but he refuses to eat or speak. Beth tries to coax him out of mourning.

During the film, it is revealed that just like Lucas, Matt's father, a Texas Ranger, was killed in the line of duty as a lawman. This detail was never mentioned in the entire 20-year course of the television series.

== Cast ==
- James Arness as Matt Dillon
- Bruce Boxleitner as Davis Healy
- Amy Stock-Poynton as Beth Reardon
- Alan Scarfe as Sean Devlin
- Christopher Bradley as Josh Reardon
- Mikey LeBeau as Martin Miller
- Kelly Morgan as Lucas Miller
- Apesanahkwat as Six Eyes
- Hallie Foote as Hannah Miller
- Clark Brolly as Jesse
- Don Collier as Sheriff (Dillion Ranch)
- Ed Adams as Waco
- Wayne Anthony as Hotel Clerk
- Bing Blenman as Hardcase
- Tom Brinson as Potter
- Dave Adams as Sam the Cook
- Sandy Gibbons as Sheriff Deke Clamber
- Mike Kevil as Bobby
- Richard Lundin as Stage Driver
- Kyle Marsh as Cathy
- Jonathan Mincks as Fred (Bandit)
- Billy Joe Patton as Grady (Dillion Ranch Hand)
- Ric San Nicholas as Al
- Forrie J. Smith as Donny
- Robin Wayne as Henry

== Reception ==
The film received mediocre reviews, but ranked sixth in its time-slot, with a 11.5/17 rating/share, and 35th out of 85 programs airing that week. It competed against five other shows which had higher Nielsen Ratings for its 8-10 PM time-slot: NBC's Seinfeld (4th at 22.0/32), Frasier (6th at 21.1/31), Wings (10th at 18.0/27), and Mad About You (17th at 15.4/23), and FOX's The Simpsons (25th at 13.3/20).
