= John Mantley =

Canadian actor and writer

- Born: John Truman Mantley; April 25, 1920; Toronto, Ontario, Canada
- Died: January 14, 2003 (aged 82); Sherman Oaks, California, US
- Spouse: Angela Mantley (1952-2003)

John Truman Mantley (April 25, 1920 – January 14, 2003) was a Canadian theatrical actor, writer, director, screenwriter and producer of the long-running television series, Gunsmoke. He was also Mary Pickford's cousin.

== Family ==
Mantley had a sister, eleven years older than himself, who taught dancing well into her eighties. Mantley said that she was "the one born in a (show business) trunk, but strangely enough, I was the one who ended up involved in television and films."

Their father, Cecil Clay Van Manzer, adopted the stage name Clay Mantley. Van Manzer met his wife Violet Petello in 1906 in New York City at the casting of The Convict's Daughter, directed by Maurice Costello. He later wrote playlets which his wife appeared in on the vaudeville circuit.

In later years Van Manzer operated a traveling circus while his wife ran a number of concession stands in a park across the lake from Toronto. Their son John operated the candy booth and at 17 traveled with the carnival, serving as the bingo game barker.

== Childhood ==
Reading was Mantley's childhood escape and his dream was to become an actor. While attending St. Catherine's Institute of Vocation School in Toronto, he persuaded a teacher to open a dramatic society, of which he became its first president. "And, therefore", he said, "I got to play the leads in all sorts of marvelous melodramas" in addition to performing as an athlete in high school. He was later president of the Victoria College Dramatic Society, which won international competitions.

== Career ==
Mantley trained as a fighter pilot in the Royal Canadian Air Force during World War II, and was sent to England and India. While there he exchanged long letters with his second cousin Mary Pickford, from which later evolved his first novel, The 27th Day. After the war he studied at the Pasadena Playhouse, where he graduated magna cum laude. Earning his master's degree, he subsequently performed in a variety of roles in the legitimate theatre, including the role of Sir Robert Cecil to Jane Cowl's lead in Elizabeth the Great; a two-year summer theatre run of The Hasty Heart, and Summer Smoke with Dorothy McGuire. His final role in legitimate theatre was the lead role in Cyrano de Bergerac at the Kansas City Playhouse.

The actor returned to his native Canada to recover from exhaustion. While there, the United Kingdom issued a tax on American films and "Hollywood went into complete chaos. Entire departments of all the major studios were dismantled and it was really a bad time in the film industry." He had planned to work for Mary Pickford following graduation from Pasadena Playhouse, but she sold both her production companies when it appeared there was no future for the motion picture industry.

Mantley worked in radio shows with Lorne Greene, of Bonanza television fame, as well as other actors who later had successful careers. He eventually played the lead on Buckingham Theatre the most prestigious program on Canadian radio's coast-to-coast network. Subsequent acting and directing roles won him provincial and national awards comparable to the American ANTA.

He then returned to California to perform at the La Jolla Playhouse and to New York City, "where I starved", he said. He eventually played the leads in a number of shows produced by Harvey Marlow, and assumed his job as producer of television station WOR. There he produced "Mr. & Mrs. Mystery", written by John Gay, who later won an Oscar for Separate Tables.

The Canadian actor also produced the first foreign language television show in the U.S., starring an all-Italian cast, and he changed his name for the show to Giovanni Mantley. During his time at WOR, Mantley began to write for television and edited scripts from university students because the station could not afford a writer. He then spent four years in Rome, where he produced and directed a series of 39 successful half-hour dramatic anthologies for American television, a pioneering effort which played in some 200 markets.

The first of Mantley's three children was born in Italy, where the couple managed to financially survive because John's wife Angela did the voiceovers—post synchronization of the voices of Gina Lollobrigida and Sophia Loren, among others. Mantley said that he translated Italian films into English by the lip synching process because American audiences would not accept subtitles, "and because at that time the American motion picture industry would not sell their films to television because they were trying to destroy the media."

When the Mantleys returned to California, he began his writing career, turning out a number of short stories and articles. He wrote his first novel, The 27th Day, which became a "Book of the Month Club" selection and was adapted to film for Columbia Pictures. At Mary Pickford's urging, he then wrote The Snow Birch, which was produced by 20th Century Fox as Woman Obsessed starring Susan Hayward.

Mantley's first television script was for Westinghouse Desilu Playhouse, for which he wrote five. He also wrote for Harrigan and Son, The Untouchables, The Outer Limits, Kraft Theatre, Rawhide, and freelanced scripts for Gunsmoke, the longest running dramatic show in television history, which he produced for the next ten years. "I can tell you that James Arness and the crew were great fun to work with," he said.

John Mantley received five consecutive Western Heritage awards for his Gunsmoke series, and shared writing honors with Calvin Clements and Earl Wallace for a 1978 Spur Award from Western Writers of America for How the West Was Won. He also received the William F. Cody Award.

He operated his own production company for a number of years, and was loaned out to produce The Wild Wild West, Dirty Sally, and How the West Was Won, as well as films. He also served on the board of directors of the Producers Guild of America and hosted the earliest meeting of the Caucus of Producers, Writers, and Directors in his own backyard.

Mantley felt that networks should stay out of the creative process. During the golden age of television, "the only people who looked at your rough cuts, or your manuscripts, were advertising agencies in order to protect their clients. They came to rough cut screenings to make sure that you didn't "ford" a river if you were sponsored by Chevrolet, as was Bonanza. As a result, Bonanza in its thirteen-year history, never forded a river. They crossed rivers. On the other hand, we at Gunsmoke forded a lot of rivers, but I was fond of saying that 'we never chevroleted one.'" (Excerpted from S. Jean Mead's interview with John Mantley for her book, Maverick Writers, pages 151-55.)

John Mantley produced the second season of Buck Rogers in the 25th Century.

== Filmography ==
=== Films ===
Year	Film	Credit	Notes
1949	Sword in the Desert	Actor (Uncredited)	Role: Orderly
1950	Three Came Home	Actor	Role: Australian POW
1950	The Secret Fury	Actor	Role: Hotel Clerk
1957	The 27th Day	Screenplay By, Story By	
1957	The Parson and the Outlaw	Writer, Dialogue Director	Co-Wrote Screenplay with "Oliver Drake"
1959	Woman Obsessed	Story By	Based on his novel "The Snow Birch"
1965	My Blood Runs Cold	Screenplay By	Based on a story by "John Meredyth Lucas"
1968	Firecreek	Producer	
1970	Cutter's Trail	Producer	
1987	Gunsmoke: Return to Dodge	Producer	
1990	Gunsmoke: The Last Apache	Executive Producer	

=== Television ===
Year	TV Series	Credit	Notes
1955	Conrad Nagel Theater	Actor, director	5 episodes
1959	Westinghouse Desilu Playhouse	Writer	2 episodes
1960-63	The Untouchables	Writer	12 episodes
1962	Checkmate	Writer	1 Episode
1962	Kraft Theatre	Writer	1 Episode
1964	The Great Adventure	Writer, Story Editor	2 episodes
1964	The Outer Limits	Writer	1 Episode
1964-65	Rawhide	Writer	2 episodes
1964-75	Gunsmoke	Writer, Story Consultant, Producer, Executive Producer, Associate Producer	Multiple Episodes
1965-66	The Wild Wild West	Producer	8 episodes
1974	Dirty Sally	Writer, executive producer	14 episodes
1976-79	How The West Was Won	Writer, executive producer	Multiple Episodes
1981	Buck Rogers in the 25th Century	Executive Producer	11 episodes
1986	MacGyver	Producer	9 episodes
