= Amy Stoch =

American actress

- Born: Cleveland, Ohio, U.S.
- Other names: Amy Stock; Amy Stock-Poynton
- Education: Ashland University; California State University, Northridge; University of Illinois at Urbana–Champaign
- Occupation: Actress
- Years active: 1986–present
- Spouse: Robert Poynton (m. 1987; div. 2004)
- Children: 1

Amy Stoch is an American actress and academic, also known as Amy Stock-Poynton.

== Life and career ==
Stoch was born and raised in Cleveland, Ohio, and wanted to be an actress from a young age. She had her break when she reached the semifinals in the spokesmodel category on the television show Star Search, and one of the show's judges, Sue Cameron, offered to represent her.

In 1986, she played Britta Englund, a former KGB agent who was involved in a love triangle with Patch Johnson and Bo Brady, on Days of Our Lives. There, she met actor Robert Poynton, who played John Black. They married in 1987 and had a son, Robert Andrew Poynton V but divorced in 2004.

In 1987, she played a recurring role in a major story arc on Dallas as Lisa Alden, the biological aunt of Christopher Ewing. She played Missy, the sexy stepmother of Bill and later Ted, in Bill & Ted's Excellent Adventure, and its sequels Bill & Ted's Bogus Journey and Bill & Ted Face the Music. Stoch also appeared in four television movies of the Gunsmoke series, as Marshal Matt Dillon's daughter Beth, and made guest appearances on Matlock, The Fall Guy, Hardcastle and McCormick, Dynasty, Knots Landing, and High Incident, among others. She also played Fawn Hall in the miniseries, Guts and Glory: The Rise and Fall of Oliver North.

=== Academia ===
Stoch holds a bachelor of arts in theatre from Ashland University, and a master's from California State University, Northridge.

In 2012, she completed a PhD in theatre history, theory, and criticism from the University of Illinois at Urbana–Champaign.

== Filmography ==
Year	Title	Type	Character
1986	Days of Our Lives	TV series	Britta Englund
1986	Soul Man	Film	as Girl in Bed
1987	Summer School	Film	as Kim
1987–88	Dallas	TV series	as Lisa Alden (16 episodes)
1989	Bill & Ted's Excellent Adventure	Film	as Missy
1989	Guts and Glory: The Rise and Fall of Oliver North	TV movie	as Fawn Hall
1990	Gunsmoke: The Last Apache	TV movie	as Beth Yarnder
1991	Bill & Ted's Bogus Journey	Film	as Missy
1992	Gunsmoke: To the Last Man	TV movie	as Beth Dillon
1993	Gunsmoke: The Long Ride	TV movie	as Beth Reardon
1993	Kiss of a Killer	TV movie	as Young Mrs. Wilson
1994	Gunsmoke: One Man's Justice	TV movie	as Beth Reardon
1996	The Little Death	Film	as Meredith Hannon
1996	High Incident	TV series	
1994	Beanstalk	Film	as Rebecca Taylor (Jack's mom)
1996	Murder, She Wrote	TV series	as Amy Ortega in episode "Death Goes Double Platinum"
1998	The Lake	TV movie	as Saleswoman
2001	The Perfect Nanny	TV movie	as Beth O'Reilly
2010	The Strip	Film	as Mrs. Davis
2020	Bill & Ted Face the Music	Film	as Missy
