= Gunsmoke: The Long Ride =

1993 film

- DVD cover
- Genre: Western
- Based on: Gunsmoke
- Written by: Bill Stratton
- Directed by: Jerry Jameson
- Starring: James Arness
- Music by: Artie Kane
- Country of origin: United States
- Original language: English

Production
- Executive producer: James Arness
- Producer: Norman Powell
- Production locations: Bonanza Creek Ranch - 15 Bonanza Creek Lane, Santa Fe, New Mexico; Cook Ranch, Galisteo, New Mexico; Santa Clara Pueblo, Santa Clara, New Mexico
- Cinematography: Ross A. Maehl
- Editor: Scott Powell
- Running time: 94 minutes
- Production company: CBS Entertainment Production

Original release
- Network: CBS
- Release: May 8, 1993

Related
- Gunsmoke: To the Last Man; Gunsmoke: One Man's Justice

Gunsmoke: The Long Ride is a 1993 American Western television film based on the TV series Gunsmoke, in which the main character, Matt Dillon is played by James Arness. It was preceded by Gunsmoke: Return to Dodge (1987), Gunsmoke: The Last Apache (1990), and Gunsmoke: To the Last Man (1992). The subsequent television film, Gunsmoke: One Man's Justice (1994), is the last in the series.

== Plot ==
The now retired Marshal Matt Dillon is at his ranch enjoying the wedding of his daughter when a posse comes to arrest him for the murder of a man. Assuming that he has been confused with another man, Dillon accompanies the posse back to town to straighten things out, but he realizes that there is a reward of $5,000 for his head.

Dillon escapes from the two men who arrested him when it becomes obvious that they plan to kill him for the reward. Still having faith in the law, he rides to the nearest town and sends for the nearest Circuit Court Judge who he feels can give him a fair trial. But local Sheriff Meriweather is a timid man without the gumption to stand up to a violent posse being led by the son of the murdered man, Jules Braxton Jr.

Taking to the open prairie, Dillon eludes the posse by taking a short cut through Ute Indian territory; which the posse cautiously detours around. Dillon meets John Parsley, a mildly disgraced former preacher, and saves him from a charge of horse stealing from the Utes. "Uncle Jane Merkel" runs an isolated horse-trading post and is the nearest safe haven. It becomes obvious there is a stalled romantic relationship between Parsley and Jane. Parsley feels he abandoned his faith to join a "Gold Rush" stampede, and sticks by Matt's side to prove himself.

Collie Whitebird, the youngest member of the gang, has been shot and left to die by his confederates. Taking him back to Jane's, Matt supervises the necessary amputation of Whitebird's leg. His condition is still serious, and Matt needs a live witness to prove his innocence.

Two gang members are left and Dillon kills one in a necessary saloon shoot out, being careful not to hit the woman he was in bed with. Another outlaw, captured alive, tries to escape and is accidentally killed when he and Parsley wrestle for a shotgun and it is accidentally fired. This leaves it up to a grateful Whitebird, who may or may not survive the bumpy journey back to civilization.

The posse arrives at Jane's place after Matt and his party have left. When she refuses to sell them fresh horses at any price, they murder her. Parsley notices her favorite horse among the pursuing posse, senses what has happened, and angrily attacks them. Parsley is killed, but the ensuing shoot out cuts the posse's numbers by half.

Matt's daughter and son-in-law have followed him against orders, but find themselves hamstrung in their efforts to help. His daughter finally decides to break into the office of the dead man's attorney and discover that the son leading the posse was about to be disinherited. The son launches a final desperate attack on the doctor's office where Whitebird is being treated, but Matt's daughter and Dr. Strader prove to be more than adequate shots. When the son takes Matt's daughter hostage, Dillon calmly kills him with a straight and steady shot to the head, ending the life of the man who actually murdered his own father.

Matt returns to Jane's ranch and supervises burying her and Parsley side by side. Whitebird receives a sympathy release in return for his testimony.

== Cast ==
- James Arness as Matt Dillon
- James Brolin as John Parsley
- Amy Stock-Poynton as Beth Reardon
- Christopher Bradley as Josh Reardon
- Patrick Dollaghan as Deputy Monaghan
- Don McManus as Jules Braxton Jr.
- Marco Sanchez as Collie Whitebird
- Ali MacGraw as Jane Merkel
- Tim Choate as Sheriff Bart Meriweather
- Michael Greene as Ike Berry
- Stewart Moss as Dr. Strader
- Jim Beaver as Traveling Blacksmith
- Sharon Mahoney as Amanda Southwick
- Richard Dano as Skeeter Padgett
- Ed Adams as Tebbel
- John David Garfield as Skinner
- Victor Izay as Paster Zach
- Dough Katenay as Two Hawk
- Fred Lopez as Deputy Spinoza

== Reception ==
The film won its time-slot with a 10.2/19 rating/share, and ranked 43rd out of 88 programs airing that week.
