= Fire and Rain (film) =

1989 television film directed by Jerry Jameson

- Theatrical poster
- Genre: Drama; Disaster
- Based on: Fire and Rain: A Tragedy in American Aviation by Jerome Greer Chandler
- Written by: Gary Sherman
- Directed by: Jerry J. Jameson
- Starring: Charles Haid; Angie Dickinson; Tom Bosley
- Music by: Artie Kane
- Country of origin: United States
- Original language: English

Production
- Producer: Richard Luke
- Production locations: Dallas; Irving, Texas
- Cinematography: Frederick Moore
- Editor: Tom Stevens
- Running time: 89 minutes
- Production company: Wilshire Court Productions

Original release
- Network: USA Network
- Release: September 13, 1989

Fire and Rain is a 1989 American made-for-television disaster film directed by Jerry J. Jameson, starring Charles Haid, Angie Dickinson, and Tom Bosley, as well as an all-star ensemble television cast in supporting roles. It is based on the Delta Air Lines Flight 191 plane crash at Dallas/Fort Worth International Airport on August 2, 1985, as depicted in Fire and Rain: A Tragedy in American Aviation (1986) by Jerome Greer Chandler.

Jerry J. Jameson had become known for his work on "movie-of-the-week phenomenon and group-jeopardy suspense and terror", although he also became a specialist in "one-off" television and film features. The film was an example of the aviation "disaster" film, as well, it also very much fits the additional genre of the complex, heavily character-driven ensemble cast film, exploring the personal dramas and interactions that develop among the passengers and crew as they deal with a deadly onboard emergency. It, however, veers from the traditional format as it is based on a real-life accident. It originally debuted on the USA television network.

== Plot ==
On August 2, 1985, Delta Air Lines Flight 191 a Lockheed L-1011 flown by Captain Connors (John Beck) and First Officer Rudy Price (Dick Christie) is preparing to land at Dallas/Fort Worth International Airport on its single stop, flying from Fort Lauderdale, Florida to Los Angeles via Dallas Fort Worth. Air Traffic controllers advise that a thunderstorm is present. The flight crew surmise that the plane might get washed, but have no other worries about the storm being so near. Passengers such as Lucille Jacobson (Patti LaBelle), who is terrified of flying, however, are fearful about landing in a storm. Others, like Marilyn (Gloria Hocking) and Mike Steinberg (Joe Berryman) are thinking more about their California vacation. As the rain pelts down on the plane, there is no warning of an impending crisis.

Without warning, the L-1011 is slammed into the ground, a mile short of the runway, slicing into a small car on the road, killing William Mayberry (Rudy Young), before skidding onto the field and exploding. Within a minute, all airport fire and emergency units are alerted. Five minutes into the rescue, first responders Jack Ayers (Dean Jones), Beth Mancini (Angie Dickinson), led by Bob Sonnamaker (Charles Haid) are rapidly deployed to the scene. The severed rear section of the plane is where most survivors are found although flight attendants at the front also survive.

== Cast ==
- Charles Haid as Bob Sonnamaker (Note: After the sole listing of Charles Haid, the cast list was shown in alphabetical order.)
- Angie Dickinson as Beth Mancini
- Tom Bosley as Derryl Price
- Robert Guillaume as Carter Guthrie
- Susan Ruttan as Sandra Thompson
- John Beck as Captain Connors
- Dean Jones as Jack Ayers
- Dick Christie as First Officer Rudy Price
- Penny Fuller as Peggy Hamilton
- David Hasselhoff as Dr. Dan Meyer
- Patti LaBelle as Lucille Jacobson
- Lawrence Pressman as Paul Hamilton
- Joe Berryman as Michael Steinberg
- Gloria Hocking as Marilyn Steinberg
- Blue Deckert as Jim Rodman
- L. Gregg Loso as Clint Smith
- Marianne Rogers as Wanda
- Angie Bolling as Helen Smith/Sally Howard
- Jerry Young as Christopher Meier
- Rudy Young as William Mayberry
- Annie Biggs as Terri Mayberry
- Desi Doyen as Susan Anderson
- Gary Moody as Charles Petty
- Vernon Grote as Rescue Worker
- Macaulay Bruton as Rabbi
- Norma Harris Gordon as Amy Hughes
- Patricia Zehentmayr as herself
- Phil Shirey as Lead Person

== Production ==
The film's utilized images of Delta's Lockheed L-1011 fleet, which had the same livery throughout the 28-year span of service with the airline.

Filmed at Dallas-Fort Worth International Airport, the film was a docudrama that recreated the events of August 2, 1985, when Delta Air Lines Flight 191, a Lockheed L-1011-385-1 TriStar airliner flying from Fort Lauderdale, Florida to Los Angeles was coming into Dallas/Fort Worth International Airport on its single stop on the route. It unexpectedly flew into an isolated thunderstorm hovering very close to the field. The storm created a dangerous "wind shear", or "microburst", dashing it into the ground just slightly more than a mile north of the outer perimeter.

The film incorporated the true-life stories of many of the 152 passengers and 11 crew members on board. In the end, 137 died and 28 survived; one other person on the ground was also killed. The prologue to the film indicated that the crash was one of the worst aircraft mishaps in U.S. history. Up to that time, the circumstances behind it regarding microbursts and wind shears of the kind that brought it down, as well as the kind of thunderstorm that caused them, were unknown. Subsequently, the investigation and review of procedures led to modifications in all big-body civil aircraft whereby their radar could detect the anomalies of major storm systems. At the time, it could only detect the actual presence of the storm itself. A groundbreaking legal action also resulted.

Many firefighters and emergency personnel were portrayed by real first responders from the Dallas-Fort Worth Metroplex. Some of them had been on duty during the actual rescue following the crash, and were, in effect, portraying themselves.

== In popular culture ==
Fire and Rain was not the only dramatization of the crash of Delta Flight 191. It was also featured on an episode of When Weather Changed History on The Weather Channel, and the episode "Deadly Weather" of Survival in the Sky. The television series Mayday (aka Air Crash Investigation or Air Emergency) on Discovery Channel Canada and National Geographic dramatized it in the episode "Invisible Killer" (aka "Slammed to the Ground"). It was also shown and discussed in a later Mayday episode about the American Airlines Flight 1420 accident, which also occurred during landing in bad weather conditions.
