= Gunsmoke: Return to Dodge =

1987 TV film

- DVD cover
- Written by: Jim Byrnes
- Directed by: Vincent McEveety
- Starring: James Arness; Amanda Blake; Steve Forrest; Buck Taylor; Earl Holliman
- Theme music composer: Jerrold Immel
- Country of origin: United States
- Original language: English

Production
- Producer: John Mantley
- Production locations: Calgary; Canmore, Alberta; Kananaskis Country; Morley, Alberta
- Cinematography: Charles Correll
- Editor: Ray Daniels
- Running time: 94 minutes
- Production companies: CBS Entertainment Productions; CBS

Original release
- Network: CBS
- Release: September 26, 1987

Related
- Gunsmoke season 20; Gunsmoke: The Last Apache

Gunsmoke: Return to Dodge is a 1987 American Western television film based on the 20-year (1955–1975) TV series Gunsmoke starring James Arness. Subsequent television films are Gunsmoke: The Last Apache (1990), Gunsmoke: To the Last Man (1992), Gunsmoke: The Long Ride (1993), and Gunsmoke: One Man's Justice (1994), none of which are set in Dodge, nor do they share any cast members from the television series other than Arness.

== Plot ==
Retired U.S. Marshal Matt Dillon, now a fur trapper, is attacked on a riverbank by a group of men trying to steal his rifle and furs. Dillon is stabbed in the back and drifts down the river in the canoe until he is found by a wagoner and taken to Dodge City, Kansas. Everybody recognizes the beloved former lawman and he is nursed back to health. After three weeks of recovery, Dillon awakens to Miss Kitty, a former saloon owner who has returned to Dodge from New Orleans on news that her old flame Dillon was dying.

Meanwhile, in the territorial prison, after doing twelve years, notorious gunslinger Will Mannon is lashed one last time before release. He vows revenge on the men who sent him there: the judge and the marshal, Matt Dillon. Overhearing his plans, fellow convict Jake Flagg takes it upon himself to warn Marshal Dillon, an old friend. After Mannon is released, Flagg takes the prison warden hostage, to escape and track down Mannon. Unfortunately the warden tries to break free from Flagg, who was about to let him go free, and is wounded in the process. Flagg has no choice but to leave the disabled warden as he will be shortly found by the pursuing prison guards. After Flagg leaves, Mannon arrives and shoots the warden, knowing Flagg will be blamed for the murder. Later, Mannon finds the judge fishing on a river and murders him too. He makes for Dodge to find the marshal.

In Dodge City an inexperienced young cavalry officer, Lt. Dexter, meets Dillon at the saloon and announces a reward for the capture of escaped felon and murderer, Jake Flagg. Lt. Dexter intends to bring Flagg to justice without help from his cavalry troop. Dillon knows Flagg is no murderer and goes to find him before the foolhardy officer gets himself killed trying to capture Flagg.

Flagg arrives at an Indian camp and joyfully greets his wife, Little Doe, and daughter, Bright Water. After he leaves to find Dillon, bounty hunters, the same men who attacked Dillon on the riverbank, led by Digger McCloud, arrive and take Flagg's wife hostage. Later, in the ravaged camp several more bounty hunters hold Bright Water, but she is rescued by Lt. Dexter and Dillon.

Mannon arrives in Dodge City demanding to find the marshal. Mannon and Miss Kitty each have a series of flashbacks. Talking to Hannah, the barkeep, Kitty reveals that she didn't marry Dillon because she couldn't bear to have him wounded near death all of the time, and she left for New Orleans when Dillon retired. She then recalls how the gunslinger and killer Mannon abused her and was finally brought to justice by Marshal Dillon twelve years ago. Once again, Mannon takes Kitty captive to blackmail Dillon. The new marshal, Newly, rides to bring Dillon to Dodge.

Flagg reunites with his daughter, Bright Water, and Dillon, and they are about to rescue his wife when Lt. Dexter shows up and gets wounded the next day in the gunfight. Too slow to outrun the bounty hunters, Flagg sacrifices himself to hold off the pursuit while Dillon takes the women and the wounded officer to the trail to the fort. Dillon returns and fights off the bounty hunters, but Flagg is killed before he can go to Canada.

The new marshal Newly finds Dillon at his cabin and tells him Kitty is in danger from Mannon, but his horse breaks a leg and Dillon has to go on alone. Kitty is held in a hotel room in Dodge by Mannon. She manages to throw his gun belt out the window just as Dillon arrives. The inebriated Mannon is then tossed out the window by Dillon. In the dusty night street he draws one last time, but Dillon is faster and shoots him dead. The townspeople gather at the scene as their former marshal leaves. Kitty wistfully watches from the window.

== Cast ==
- James Arness as Matt Dillon
- Amanda Blake as Miss Kitty Russell
- Steve Forrest as Will Mannon
- Buck Taylor as Newly O'Brien
- Earl Holliman as Jake Flagg
- Fran Ryan as Hannah
- Ken Olandt as Lt. Brian Dexter
- W. Morgan Sheppard as Digger McCloud
- Patrice Martinez as Bright Water
- Tantoo Cardinal as Little Doe
- Mickey Jones as Oakum
- Frank M. Totino as Logan
- Robert Koons as Warden Brown
- Walter Kaasa as Judge Collins
- Georgie Collins as Mrs Collins
- Tony Epper as Farnum
- Louie Elias as Bubba
- Ken Kirzinger as Potts
- Denny Arnold as Clyman
- Alex Green as The Flogger
- Paul Daniel Wood as Harry
- Larry Musser as Wilber
- Robert Clinton as Guard
- Frank Huish as Watt
- Jacob Rupp as Hutter
- Mary Jane Wildman as Indian Woman
- Tom Brown (flashback)
- Ken Curtis (flashback)
- Ted Jordan (flashback)
- Milburn Stone (flashback)

== Production ==
Although it is supposed to be set in the wilds of Kansas, it was filmed in Alberta, Canada.

Ken Curtis, who played Festus on the series, turned the project down in the wake of being offered far less compensation than Amanda Blake.

Blake returned to the role of Miss Kitty after having left Gunsmoke prior to the original series' 20th and final season. This was her last appearance in the role. She died less than two years after the original release.

Arness initially wanted to play the part of Jake Flagg, considering it the lead role of the film in a first draft of the script, according to producer John Mantley.

== Reception ==
The film ranked second in its time-slot, with a 16.6/31 rating/share, and ranked 28th out of 68 programs airing that week.
