= Gunsmoke =

American media franchise

Films and television
- Television series: Gunsmoke (1955–1975); Dirty Sally (1974)
- Television films: Return to Dodge (1987); The Last Apache (1990); To the Last Man (1992); The Long Ride (1993); One Man's Justice (1994)

Audio
- Radio program: Gunsmoke (1952–1961)

Gunsmoke is a media franchise centered around the American radio and television Western drama series created by director Norman Macdonnell and writer John Meston. It centered on Dodge City, Kansas, in the 1870s, during the settlement of the American West. The central character is U.S. Marshal Matt Dillon, played by William Conrad on radio and James Arness on television.

The radio series ran from 1952 to 1961. John Dunning wrote that, among radio drama enthusiasts, "Gunsmoke is routinely placed among the best shows of any kind and any time." It ran unsponsored for its first few years, with CBS funding its production.

In 1955, the series was adapted for television and ran for 20 seasons. It ran for half-hour episodes from 1955 to 1961, and one-hour episodes from 1961 to 1975. A total of 635 episodes were aired over its 20-year run, making it the longest-running scripted American primetime television series until being surpassed in episodes by The Simpsons. At the end of its run in 1975, Los Angeles Times columnist Cecil Smith wrote: "Gunsmoke was the dramatization of the American epic legend of the west. Our own Iliad and Odyssey, created from standard elements of the dime novel and the pulp Western as romanticized by Buntline, Harte, and Twain. It was ever the stuff of legend." Five made-for-TV movies were produced after its 20-year run. The show won 15 Primetime Emmy Awards as well as other accolades. It was frequently well received, holding a top-10 spot in the Nielsen ratings for several seasons.

The franchise also spawned comic book series as well as books and a collection of short stories by Ballantine Books.

== Premise ==
Set in Dodge City, Kansas during the years following the American Civil War, the series follows the lives of U.S. Marshal Matt Dillon and the citizens he is sworn to protect. Among them are his sidekick Chester Goode and later Festus Haggen, town physician Dr. Galen "Doc" Adams, and saloon owner Miss Kitty Russell. Most episodes involve disruptions caused by those arriving from outside Dodge City. Since Dillon's authority extends beyond the town, some episodes focus on his travels, while other plots revolve around mishaps occurring while Dillon is gone. Both Goode and Haggen are shown to be loyal, but often inept or indecisive at handling problems when Dillon is not around. Although Dillon and Miss Kitty are never portrayed in a romantic relationship, it is apparent they care deeply for each other. Doc Adams is portrayed as a very competent and caring physician, but his conservative treatment methods often frustrate his patients who expect a quick recovery. Doc and both sidekicks are often used as comic relief over the course of the series.

== Radio series (1952–1961) ==
Gunsmoke
- Publicity photo from Gunsmoke's radio version (photo from 1954)
- Genre: Western
- Running time: 30 minutes
- Country of origin: United States
- Language: English
- TV adaptations: Gunsmoke
- Starring: William Conrad; Parley Baer; Howard McNear; Georgia Ellis
- Announcer: George Walsh
- Created by: Norman Macdonnell; John Meston
- Produced by: Norman Macdonnell
- Original release: April 26, 1952 – June 18, 1961
- No. of series: 9
- No. of episodes: 480 (List of episodes)
- Audio format: Monaural

In the late 1940s, CBS chairman William S. Paley, a fan of the Philip Marlowe radio series, asked his programming chief, Hubell Robinson, to develop a hardcore Western series, about a "Philip Marlowe of the Old West". Robinson delegated this to his West Coast CBS vice president, Harry Ackerman, who had developed the Philip Marlowe series.

Ackerman and his scriptwriters, Mort Fine and David Friedkin, created an audition script called "Mark Dillon Goes to Gouge Eye" based on one of their Michael Shayne radio scripts, "The Case of the Crooked Wheel", from mid-1948. Two versions were recorded. The first, recorded in June 1949, was very much like a hardcore detective series and starred Michael Rye (credited as Rye Billsbury) as Dillon; the second, recorded in July 1949, starred Straight Arrow actor Howard Culver in a more Western, lighter version of the same script. CBS liked the Culver version better, and Ackerman was told to proceed.

A complication arose when Culver's contract as the star of Straight Arrow would not allow him to do another Western series. The project was suspended for three years, when producer Norman Macdonnell and writer John Meston discovered it while creating an adult Western series of their own.

Macdonnell and Meston wanted to create a radio Western for adults, in contrast to the prevailing juvenile fare such as The Lone Ranger and The Cisco Kid. They wanted to call the show "Jeff Spain" after a character they had created and used in several of their anthology shows, but Ackerman had already coined the title Gunsmoke which CBS wanted to use. Gunsmoke was set in Dodge City, Kansas, during the thriving cattle days of the 1870s. Dunning notes, "The show drew critical acclaim for unprecedented realism."

=== Episodes ===
Season	Episodes	Originally released	
Season	Episodes	First released	Last released
1	71	April 26, 1952	August 29, 1953
2	53	September 5, 1953	August 30, 1954
3	52	September 6, 1954	August 27, 1955
4	53	September 3, 1955	August 26, 1956
5	52	September 2, 1956	August 25, 1957
6	53	September 1, 1957	August 31, 1958
7	52	September 7, 1958	August 30, 1959
8	52	September 6, 1959	August 28, 1960
9	42	September 4, 1960	June 18, 1961

=== Cast ===
The radio series first aired on CBS on April 26, 1952, with the episode "Billy the Kid", written by Walter Newman, and ended on June 18, 1961. The show stars William Conrad as Marshal Matt Dillon, Howard McNear as Doc Charles Adams, Georgia Ellis as Kitty Russell, and Parley Baer as Dillon's assistant, Chester Wesley Proudfoot.

==== Matt Dillon ====
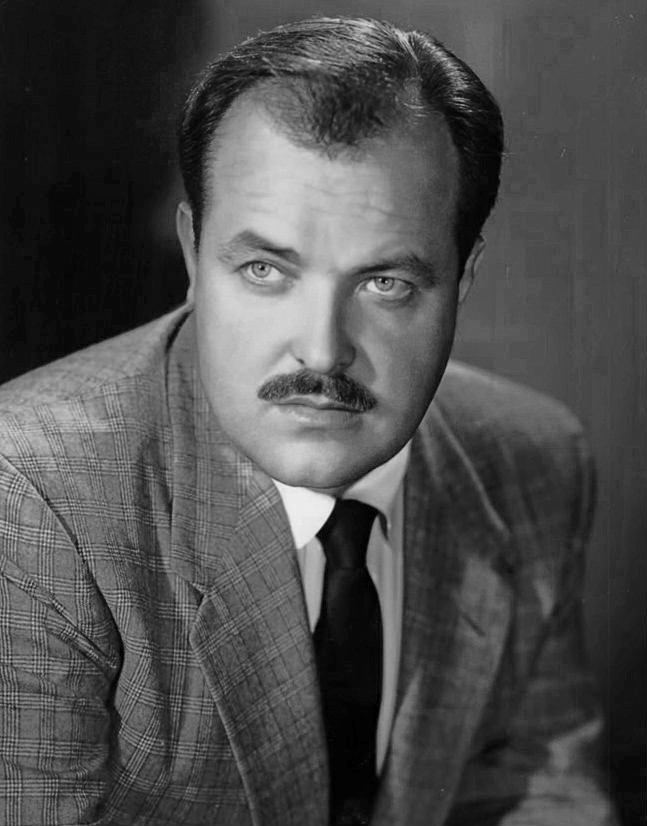
William Conrad in 1952, when Matt Dillon was created on radio

Matt Dillon was played on radio by William Conrad and on television by James Arness. Two versions of the same pilot episode titled "Mark Dillon Goes to Gouge Eye" were produced with Rye Billsbury and Howard Culver playing Marshal Mark Dillon as the lead, not yet played by Conrad. Mcadonnell and Meston both knew when they took over the project that they wanted Conrad as their lead, but CBS objected, likely due to his already heavy presence in film and radio productions. Conrad later recounted "I think when they started casting for it, somebody said, 'Good Christ, let's not get Bill Conrad, we're up to you-know where with Bill Conrad.' So they auditioned everybody, and as a last resort they called me. And I went in and read about two lines...and the next day they called me and said, 'Okay you have the job.'"

Dillon, as portrayed by Conrad, was a lonely, isolated man, toughened by a hard life. Macdonnell later claimed, "Much of Matt Dillon's character grew out of Bill Conrad." He continued, "he became a rugged Western marshal. There are times, in fact, that you can't tell where Matt Dillon begins and Bill Conrad ends off."

Dunning writes that Meston was especially disgusted by the archetypal Western hero and set out "to destroy [that type of] character he loathed". In Meston's view, "Dillon was almost as scarred as the homicidal psychopaths who drifted into Dodge from all directions." Macdonnell shared similar sentiments about the Marshal, calling him “a lonely, sad, tragic man . . . a quiet, unhappy, confused marshal; these days we’d send him to an analyst.”

==== Doc Adams ====
Howard McNear starred as Dr. Charles Adams in the radio series, and Milburn Stone portrayed Dr. Galen Adams in the television version. In the radio series, "Doc" Adams was initially a self-interested and somewhat dark character with a predilection for constantly attempting to increase his revenue through the procurement of autopsy fees. In the opening episode he was delighted when he found out that Dillon had killed someone in a gunfight meaning more business for him, which was enough for the Marshal to threaten to knock him down. He was acerbic, somewhat mercenary, and borderline alcoholic, in the program's early years.

His real name was Dr. Calvin Moore. He came west and changed his name to escape a charge of murder. However, McNear's performances steadily became more warm-hearted and sympathetic. Doc wandered throughout the territories until he settled in Dodge City 17 years later under the name of Charles Adams. Conrad suggested the Doc borrow his name from cartoonist Charles Addams as a testament to Doc's initially ghoulish comportment. Milburn Stone was given free rein to choose the character's first name, and chose that of the ancient Greek physician and medical researcher Galen.

==== Miss Kitty ====
Kitty was played by actress Georgia Ellis on radio. Ellis first appeared in the radio episode "Billy the Kid" (April 26, 1952) as "Francie Richards" – a former girlfriend of Matt Dillon's and the widow of a criminal, but the character of "Miss Kitty" did not appear until the May 10, 1952, episode "Jaliscoe". Sometime in 1959, Ellis was billed as Georgia Hawkins instead of Georgia Ellis.

In the radio series, Kitty's profession was hinted at, but never explicit; in a 1953 interview with Time, Macdonnell declared, "Kitty is just someone Matt has to visit every once in a while," explicitly sharing her secret, "We never say it, but Kitty is a prostitute, plain and simple." The magazine later observed that she is "obviously not selling chocolate bars".

Dillon and Kitty clearly have a close personal relationship. In a 1976 radio documentary on the program, Ellis shared, "Yes they were lovers, the best kind, because they really, truly understood one another. So there wasn't need for too much talk." She further posited on what Kitty really wanted out of the relationship, saying that "undoubtedly she had wild dreams from time to time that she realized were completely unrealistic, of Matt and Kitty... [but] she was resigned to serving booze and saying 'Be careful Matt!'"

==== Chester ====
Chester was played by actor Parley Baer in the radio series. Like Doc Adams, Chester was present from the first episode of the show, initially designated as simply 'Townsman' in the script. Bill Conrad wanted the character to have a proper name, stating that they should "Call him Chester or something." Baer would later go on to give him a full name, ad-libbing in a later episode "Well, as sure as my name is Chester Wesley Proudfoot..."

Chester served as Marshal Dillon's deputy in Dodge City, and was always a dependable presence for him to rely on when he needed backup. Baer posited that "Dillon trusted Chester and Doc as much as he dared trust anyone. He knew that if he needed someone to stand at his back, Chester would be there, but he wasn't sure that Chester would function at all times." Baer disagreed with a critic who saw Chester as a "dimwitted town loafer", preferring to describe him as "a dependable nonthinker."

As the show progressed the relationship between Matt Dillon and Chester Proudfoot grew from quiet tolerance to a trusting bond. In one episode, Chester saved the Marshal's life, but refused to let him discuss it in town as "it would only be embarrassing to them both."

=== Distinction from other radio Westerns ===
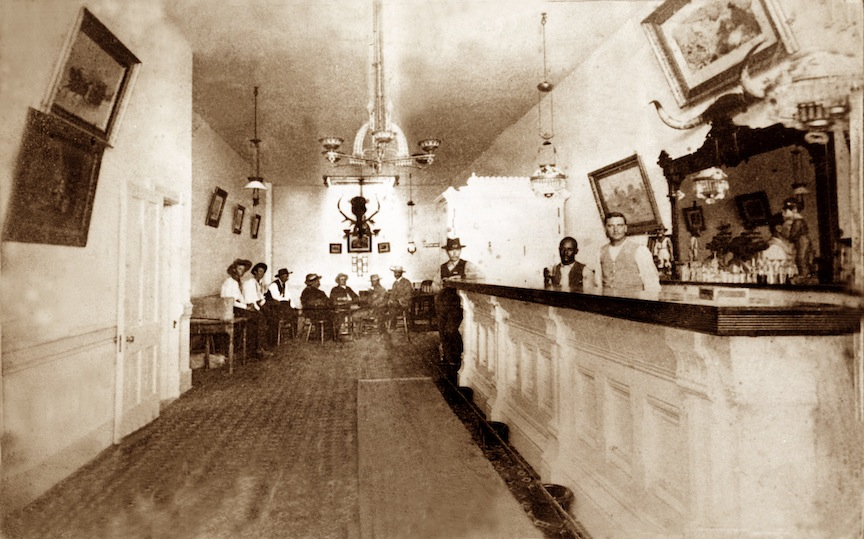
The interior of the real Long Branch Saloon in Dodge City, Kansas, photographed between 1870 and 1885

Gunsmoke is often a somber program, particularly in its early years. Dunning writes that Dillon "played his hand and often lost. He arrived too late to prevent a lynching. He amputated a dying man's leg and lost the patient anyway. He saved a girl from brutal rapists, then found himself unable to offer her what she needed to stop her from moving into ... life as a prostitute." Some listeners, such as Dunning, argue the radio version was more realistic. Episodes were aimed at adults with some of the most explicit content of their time, including violent crimes, scalpings, massacres, and opium addicts. Many episodes end on a somber note, and villains often get away with their crimes.

The program was set after the arrival of the railroad in Dodge City (1872), and Kansas had been a state since 1861. In reality, a US Marshal (actually a deputy marshal, because only the senior officer in the district holds the title "marshal") would not be based in Dodge City and would not be involved in local law enforcement.

Apart from the doleful tone, Gunsmoke is distinct from other radio Westerns, as the dialogue is often slow and halting, and the outstanding sound effects give a palpable sense of the prairie setting. The effects are subtle but multilayered, giving the show a spacious feel. John Dunning wrote, "The listener heard extraneous dialogue in the background, just above the muted shouts of kids playing in an alley. He heard noises from the next block, too, where the inevitable dog was barking."

==== Sponsorship ====
Gunsmoke is unique from other Westerns in that it was unsponsored in the first few years of production, instead being funded directly by CBS for its first two years. Series producers said that if the show were sponsored, they would have to "clean the show up". Macdonnell quipped that "Kitty would have to be living with her parents on a sweet little ranch . . . And Matt, he’d have to wear buckskin and swagger around with his guns blazing. He’d even have to ride a pure white charger." He further went on to state however that "if a sponsor did come along who would let us leave Gunsmoke as it is, then we’d really be pleased."

Gunsmoke eventually received its sponsor in Liggett & Myers cigarettes in 1954. They later dropped full sponsorship of the program in 1957 at a time that network radio as a whole was struggling, which led CBS to shop around for a new sponsor.

== Transition from radio to television ==
Not long after the radio show began, talk began of adapting it to television. Privately, Macdonnell had a guarded interest in taking the show to television, but publicly, he declared, "our show is perfect for radio", and he feared, as Dunning writes, "Gunsmoke confined by a picture could not possibly be as authentic or attentive to detail. ... In the end, CBS simply took it away from Macdonnell and began preparing for the television version."

When Gunsmoke was adapted for television in 1955, contrary to a campaign to persuade the network, the network was not interested in bringing either Conrad or his radio costars to the television medium. They were given auditions, but they were little more than token efforts – especially in Conrad's case, due to his obesity. However, Meston was kept as the main writer. In the early years, most of the television episodes were adapted from the radio scripts, often using identical scenes and dialogue. Dunning wrote, "That radio fans considered the TV show a sham and its players impostors should surprise no one. That the TV show was not a sham is due in no small part to the continued strength of Meston's scripts."

In recasting the role of Matt Dillon, Denver Pyle was considered for the role, as was Raymond Burr, who was ultimately also seen as too heavy for the part. Charles Warren, television Gunsmoke's first director, said, "His voice was fine, but he was too big. When he stood up, his chair stood with him." It has long been rumored that John Wayne was offered the role of Matt Dillon; according to Dennis Weaver's comments on the 50th Anniversary DVD, disc one, episode "Hack Prine", John Wayne was never even considered for the role; to have done so would have been preposterous, since Wayne was a top movie leading man. The belief that Wayne was asked to star is disputed by Warren. Although he agrees Wayne encouraged Arness to take the role, Warren says, "I hired Jim Arness on the strength of a picture he's done for me ... I never thought for a moment of offering it to Wayne."

According to Thomas "Duke" Miller, a television and movie celebrity expert, this story was told to him by legendary actor James Stewart: "Jimmy said he was in the office with Charles Warren when Mr. Wayne came in. Mr. Warren asked Wayne if he knew James Arness, and Mr. Wayne said yes. Mr. Warren told Mr. Wayne about the transition of the show from radio to television, and Mr. Wayne readily agreed that James Arness would be a terrific choice for the part of Matt Dillon. I have no reason to doubt the story, because Jimmy absolutely knew everybody."

In the end, the primary roles were all recast, with Arness as Marshal Matt Dillon (on the recommendation of Wayne, who also introduced the pilot), Dennis Weaver as Chester Goode, Milburn Stone as Dr. G. "Doc" Adams (the G. later specified as standing for Galen), and Amanda Blake as Miss Kitty Russell. Macdonnell became the associate producer of the television show and later the producer. Meston was head writer.

Conrad directed two television episodes, in 1963 and 1971, and McNear appeared on six, playing characters other than Doc, including three times as storekeeper Howard Rudd. Macdonnell and Meston continued the radio version of Gunsmoke until 1961, making it one of the most enduring vintage radio dramas.

== Television series (1955–1975) ==
The television series ran from September 10, 1955, to March 31, 1975, on CBS, with 635 total episodes. It is the second Western television series written for adults, premiering on September 10, 1955, four days after The Life and Legend of Wyatt Earp. The first 12 seasons aired Saturdays at 10 pm (EST), seasons 13 through 16 aired Mondays at 7:30 pm, and the last four seasons aired Mondays at 8 pm. During its second season in 1956, the program joined the list of the top-10 television programs broadcast in the United States. The following year it moved to number one and stayed there until 1961. It remained among the top-20 programs until 1964.

=== Cast ===
- Matt Dillon (1955–1975): James Arness
- Galen "Doc" Adams (1955–1975): Milburn Stone
- Kathleen "Kitty" Russell (1955–1974): Amanda Blake
- Chester B. Goode (1955–1964): Dennis Weaver
- Festus Haggen (1964–1975): Ken Curtis

Chester and Festus Haggen are Dillon's sidekicks, though others became acting deputies for 2 1/2- to 7 1/2-year stints: Quint Asper (Burt Reynolds) (1962–65), Thad Greenwood (Roger Ewing) (1965–67), and Newly O'Brien (Buck Taylor) (1967–75), who served as both back-up deputies and doctor-in-training, having some studies in medicine through his uncle, which then continued under Doc Adams. Initially on the fringes of Dodge society, Festus Haggen was slowly phased in as a reliable sidekick and part-time deputy to Matt Dillon when Reynolds left in 1965. When Milburn Stone temporarily left for heart bypass surgery in 1971, Pat Hingle played Dr. John Chapman for several episodes.

=== Production ===
The television series was filmed at the present site of California Lutheran University (CLU) and nearby Wildwood Regional Park in Thousand Oaks, California.

The Gunsmoke radio theme song and later television theme is titled "Old Trails", also known as "Boothill". The Gunsmoke theme was composed by Rex Koury. The original radio version was conducted by Koury. The television version was thought to have been first conducted by CBS west coast music director Lud Gluskin. The lyrics of the theme, never aired on the radio or television show, were recorded and released by Tex Ritter in 1955. Ritter was backed on that Capitol record by Rex Koury and the radio Gunsmoke orchestra.

From 1955 to 1961, Gunsmoke was a half-hour show, retitled Marshal Dillon in syndication. It then went to an hour-long format. The series was retitled Gun Law in the UK. The Marshal Dillon syndicated reruns of half-hour episodes lasted from 1961 until 1964 on CBS, originally on Tuesday nights within its time in reruns.

Gunsmoke was ranked television's number one show from 1957 to 1961, then it expanded to one hour and slipped into a decline. CBS planned to cancel the series in 1967 after the twelfth season, but widespread viewer reaction prevented its demise, including a mention in Congress and pressure from Babe Paley, the wife of CBS's longtime president William S. Paley. Gilligan's Island producer Sherwood Schwartz states that Babe pressured her husband not to cancel Gunsmoke in 1967, so the network cut Gilligan's Island, instead. The show continued in its new time slot at 8 pm on Mondays. This scheduling move led to a spike in ratings that had it once again rally to the top 10 in the Nielsen ratings, which again saved the series when CBS purged most of its rural content in 1971. The series remained in the top 10 until the 1973–74 television season.

"We didn't do a final, wrap-up show. We finished the 20th year, we all expected to go on for another season, or two or three. The (network) never told anybody they were thinking of cancelling."

— James Arness

After its last original airing on March 31, 1975, CBS made the decision not to renew Gunsmoke for a 21st season, without making any public announcement or informing the producers or cast members ahead of time. The entire cast was stunned by the cancellation, as they were unaware that CBS was considering it. The cast and crew read the news in the trade papers; the Mary Tyler Moore spin-offs Rhoda (which was going into its second year in the Fall-1975 season) and Phyllis (a fall-1975 freshman) would be scheduled for the 8 pm hour previously occupied by Gunsmoke that fall.

Thirty television Westerns came and went during its 20-year tenure, and Gunsmoke was the sole survivor.

=== Awards and accolades ===
- Gunsmoke was nominated for a total of 15 Emmy awards during its 20 year run on television, and won five.
- In TV Guide′s April 17, 1993, issue celebrating 40 years of television, the all-time-best-TV programs were chosen. "No contest, this [Gunsmoke] was the TV Western."
- Entertainment Weekly (February 19, 1999, issue) ranked the premiere of Gunsmoke as No. 47 in the "100 Greatest Moments in Television".
- Entertainment Weekly, in 1998, ranked Gunsmoke as No. 16 in The 100 Greatest TV Shows of all time.
- In a 1998 TV Guide poll of 50,000, Gunsmoke was ranked as CBS's best Western and James Arness was ranked as CBS's best "Gunslinger".
- In 1997, the episode "The Jailer" was ranked No. 28 on TV Guide's 100 Greatest Episodes of All Time.
- In 2002, TV Guide ranked Gunsmoke as No. 40 in the 50 greatest television shows of all time.
- In 2013, TV Guide ranked it as #27 on their list of the 60 Best Series.
- In 2013, the Writers Guild of America ranked Gunsmoke – and The Defenders – #84 on their list of the 101 Best Written TV Series.
- In 2019, the radio episode "The Cabin" was selected by the Library of Congress for preservation in the National Recording Registry for being "culturally, historically, or aesthetically significant".

== TV movies ==
In 1987, CBS commissioned a reunion movie titled Gunsmoke: Return to Dodge. James Arness and Amanda Blake returned in their iconic roles of Matt Dillon and Miss Kitty, with Fran Ryan returning as Kitty's friend and saloon-owner Hannah and Buck Taylor as Newly O'Brian. Doc Adams and Festus Haggen were not featured in the film. Milburn Stone had died seven years earlier in 1980 and the role of Doc was not recast. Ken Curtis balked at the salary offer he received and said that he should be paid based on Festus's importance in the character hierarchy. The screenwriters responded to Curtis's absence by making Newly the new Dodge City marshal. The film, shot in Alberta, features a now-retired Marshal Dillon being attacked and a vengeful former rival returning to Dodge City to entrap him.

In 1990, the second telefilm, Gunsmoke: The Last Apache, premiered. Because Amanda Blake had died the year before, the writers revisited a 1973 episode for the movie. The episode was based on "Matt's Love Story". In that episode, Matt loses his memory and his heart during a brief liaison with "Mike" Yardner (Michael Learned). In the film, Learned returns as Mike, who reveals to Marshal Dillon that he is the father of their daughter, Beth (Amy Stock-Poynton) and asks him for help in saving her from a band of Apaches.

Other films included Gunsmoke: To the Last Man (1992), Gunsmoke: The Long Ride (1993), and Gunsmoke: One Man's Justice (1994). Arness stars in all five made-for-television movies.

== Other media ==
A fight scene between Arness and guest star John Anderson from the 1958 episode "Buffalo Man" appears in the educational film Film Editing: Interpretation and Value, produced by American Cinema Editors. Footage from the scene is used in editing classes in many film schools in the United States.

The Gunsmoke brand was used to endorse numerous products, including cottage cheese and cigarettes.

The Hartland toy company included an 8" (1/9th scale) plastic Matt Dillion figure and his horse Old Faithful Buck in their line of famous TV cowboys and horses during the 1950s.

Lowell Toy Manufacturing Corporation ("It's a Lowell Game") issued Gunsmoke as game No. 822. Other products include Gunsmoke puzzles,

=== Comics ===
The television series had only been on the air a few months when Dell Comics published the first of 27 issues of their Four Color comics series on Gunsmoke. The series ran through 1961 and every cover was a full color shot of Matt Dillon and his six-gun. Gold Key Comics continued with issues #1–6 in 1969–70.

Other comics included a comic strip version of the series ran in British newspapers for several years under the show's UK title, Gun Law. Hardcover comic BBC Gunsmoke Annuals were marketed in Great Britain under the authority of the BBC which had broadcasting rights there. Gunsmoke comics in Spanish were published under the title Aventura la ley del revolver (Gun-Law Adventures).

=== Books ===
- In 1957, Ballantine Books published a collection of short stories. Each story is based on a half-hour Gunsmoke episode. Although a photo of James Arness and the CBS TV logo are on the book cover, in at least one story Matt introduces Chester as "Chester Proudfoot", an indication that the stories are actually adapted from radio scripts.
- Whitman Books published
  - Gunsmoke by Robert Turner in 1958, and
  - Gunsmoke: "Showdown on Front Street" by Paul S. Newman in 1969 ...
- In 1970, Popular Library published the following paperback book written by Chris Stratton:
  - Gunsmoke
- In 1974, Award Books published the following paperback books written by Jackson Flynn based on the television series:
  - Gunsmoke #1: "The Renegades"
  - Gunsmoke #2: "Shootout"
  - Gunsmoke #3: "Duel at Dodge City"
  - Gunsmoke #4: "Cheyenne Vengeance"
- In 1998, Boulevard Books published the following paperbacks written by Gary McCarthy based on the TV series:
  - Gunsmoke
  - Gunsmoke: "Dead Man's Witness"
  - Gunsmoke: "Marshal Festus"
- A series of novels based upon the television series written by Joseph A. West with forewords by James Arness was published by Signet:
  - Gunsmoke: "Blood, Bullets and Buckskin", January 2005 (ISBN 0-451-21348-3)
  - Gunsmoke: "The Last Dog Soldier", May 2005 (ISBN 0-451-21491-9)
  - Gunsmoke: "Blizzard of Lead", September 2005 (ISBN 0-451-21633-4)
  - Gunsmoke: "The Reckless Gun", May 2006 (ISBN 0-451-21923-6)
  - Gunsmoke: "Dodge the Devil", October 2006 (ISBN 0-451-21972-4)
  - Gunsmoke: "The Day of the Gunfighter", January 2007 (ISBN 0-451-22015-3)

== Legacy ==
=== Longevity records ===
The television series was the longest-running, primetime, live-action television series at 20 seasons, until September 2019 with the 21st-season premiere of Law & Order: Special Victims Unit. The original Law & Order, which was canceled in 2010 after tying Gunsmoke's longevity record for a live-action, primetime television series, began its 21st season in February 2022. It had the highest number of scripted episodes for any American primetime, commercial television series until April 29, 2018, when it was surpassed by The Simpsons. Some foreign-made programs have been broadcast in the United States and contend for the position as the longest-running prime-time series. As of 2016, Gunsmoke was rated fourth globally, after Doctor Who (1963–present), Taggart (1983–2010), and The Bill (1984–2010).

=== Character longevity ===
James Arness and Milburn Stone portrayed their Gunsmoke characters for 20 consecutive years, a feat later matched by Kelsey Grammer as the character Frasier Crane, but over two half-hour sitcoms (Cheers and Frasier). This was surpassed by Mariska Hargitay and Ice-T, who have portrayed the characters Olivia Benson and Fin Tutuola on Law & Order: Special Victims Unit for over 25 and 24 consecutive years to date, respectively. George Walsh, the announcer for Gunsmoke, began in 1952 on the radio series and continued until the television series was canceled in 1975.

=== In popular culture ===
Dodge City's Boot Hill Museum has a tribute to Gunsmoke, including set furniture from the 1960s and an old television tuned to the show. Signed photographs from the show's actors and other memorabilia are on display including a vest worn by Sam the bartender and a dress worn by Miss Kitty. In 2015, several of the surviving staff reunited at Wild West Fest in Dodge City, including stars Burt Reynolds, Buck Taylor, Jess Walton, Bruce Boxleitner, and writer Jim Byrnes.

James Arness, Milburn Stone, Ken Curtis, Dennis Weaver, and Amanda Blake are all inductees of the National Cowboy & Western Heritage Museum.

== Bibliography ==
- Atkinson, Brooks. "Critic at Large : Marshall Matt Dillion Survives 13 Years of Once-a-Week Incidents in Dodge." New York Times, May 22, 1964, p. 32..
- Atkinson, Brooks. "Critic at Large : The Dedicated World of ’Gunsmoke" Has Values that Transcend Mere Ratings." New York Times, November 10, 1964, p. 44.
- Barabas, SuzAnn; Barabas, Gabor (1990). Gunsmoke: A Complete History and Analysis of the Legendary Broadcast Series with a Comprehensive Episode-by-Episode Guide to Both the Radio and Television Programs -. McFarland & Company, Inc. ISBN 0899504183.; 884pp
- Greenland, David R. (2013). The Gunsmoke Chronicles: A New History of Television's Greatest Western. BearManor Media. ISBN 978-1593938765.
- MacDonald, J. Fred (1987). Who Shot the Sheriff?: The Rise and Fall of the Television Western. Praeger. ISBN 978-0-275-92326-6.
- Stanley, Jack Ross. "A History of the Radio and Television Western Dramatic Series 'Gunsmoke', 1952-1973," (PhD dissertation, University of Michigan; ProQuest Dissertations & Theses, 1973. 7415864).
- Thomas, Bob (July 4, 2002). "Arness still loves 'Gunsmoke'". Deseret News.
