= James Arness =

American actor (1923–2011)

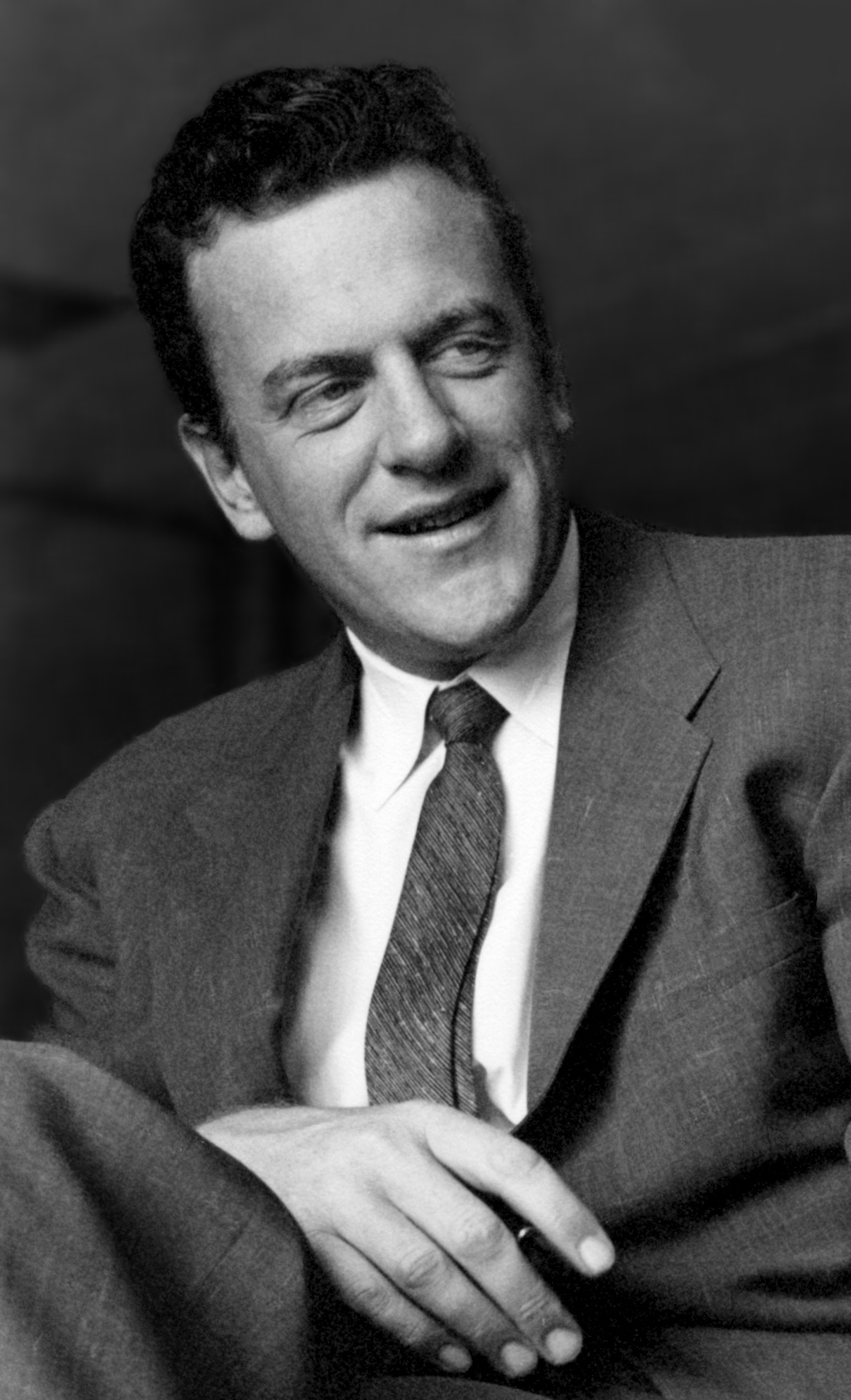
- Arness in 1970
- Born: James King Aurness; May 26, 1923; Minneapolis, Minnesota, U.S.
- Died: June 3, 2011 (aged 88); Los Angeles, California, U.S.
- Resting place: Forest Lawn Memorial Park (Glendale)
- Education: Beloit College
- Occupation: Actor
- Years active: 1947–1994
- Television: Gunsmoke (1955–1975); How the West Was Won (1976–1979); McClain's Law (1981–1982)
- Spouses: Virginia Chapman (m. 1948; div. 1960) Janet Surtees (m. 1978)
- Partner: Thordis Brandt (1965–1972)
- Children: 3
- Relatives: Peter Graves (brother)
- Military career
- Branch: United States Army
- Service years: 1943–1945
Further information
Rank	Corporal
Units	2nd Battalion, 7th Infantry Regiment; 3rd Infantry Division
Conflicts	World War II: Battle of Anzio
Awards	Bronze Star Medal; Purple Heart

James King Arness (né Aurness; May 26, 1923 – June 3, 2011) was an American actor, best known for portraying Marshal Matt Dillon for 20 years in the series Gunsmoke. He has the distinction of having played the role of Dillon in five decades: 1955 to 1975 in the weekly series, then in Gunsmoke: Return to Dodge (1987) and four more made-for-television Gunsmoke films in the 1990s. In Europe, Arness reached cult status for his role as Zeb Macahan in the Western series How the West Was Won. He was the older brother of actor Peter Graves.

== Early life ==
James Arness was born in Minneapolis. His parents were businessman Rolf Cirkler Aurness and journalist Ruth Duesler. His father's ancestry was Norwegian; his mother's was German. The family name had been Aursnes, but when Rolf's father, Peter Aursnes, emigrated from Norway in 1887, he changed it to Aurness. James Arness and his family were Methodists. Arness' younger brother was actor Peter Graves. Peter used the stage name "Graves", a maternal family name.

Arness attended John Burroughs Grade School, Washburn High School, and West High School in Minneapolis. During that time, Arness worked as a courier for a jewelry wholesaler, loading and unloading railway boxcars at the Chicago, Burlington and Quincy Railroad freight yards in Minneapolis and logging in Pierce, Idaho. Despite "being a poor student and skipping many classes," he graduated from high school in June 1942.

Arness entered Beloit College that fall, where he joined the campus choir and became a member of Beta Theta Pi fraternity.

== Military service in World War II ==
Although Arness wanted to be a naval fighter pilot, he was concerned his poor eyesight would bar him. However, it was his 6-ft, 7.5-in (2.019 m) frame that ended his chances because the height limit for aviators was set at 6 ft, 2.5 in (1.88 m). He was drafted into the US Army and reported to Fort Snelling in Hennepin County, Minnesota in March 1943. As a rifleman, he landed on Anzio Beachhead on January 22, 1944, with the 2nd Platoon, E Company, 2nd Battalion, 7th Infantry Regiment of the 3rd Infantry Division. Because of his height, Arness was the first man to be ordered off the landing craft to determine the depth of the water; it came up to his waist.

He was severely wounded in his right leg during the Battle of Anzio, and medically evacuated from Italy to the US, where he was sent to the 91st General Hospital in Clinton, Iowa. His brother Peter (later known as actor Peter Graves) came to see him when he was beginning his long recuperation, assuring him to not worry about his injuries, that likely he could find work in the field of radio. After undergoing several surgeries, Arness was honorably discharged from the Army on January 29, 1945. His wounds continued to trouble him, though, throughout the remainder of his life. In his later years, he suffered from chronic leg pain that often became acute, and was sometimes initiated when he was mounted on horses during his performances on Gunsmoke.

His military decorations included the Bronze Star, the Purple Heart, the American Campaign Medal, the European–African–Middle Eastern Campaign Medal with three bronze battle stars and arrowhead device, the World War II Victory Medal, and the Combat Infantryman Badge.

== Acting career ==
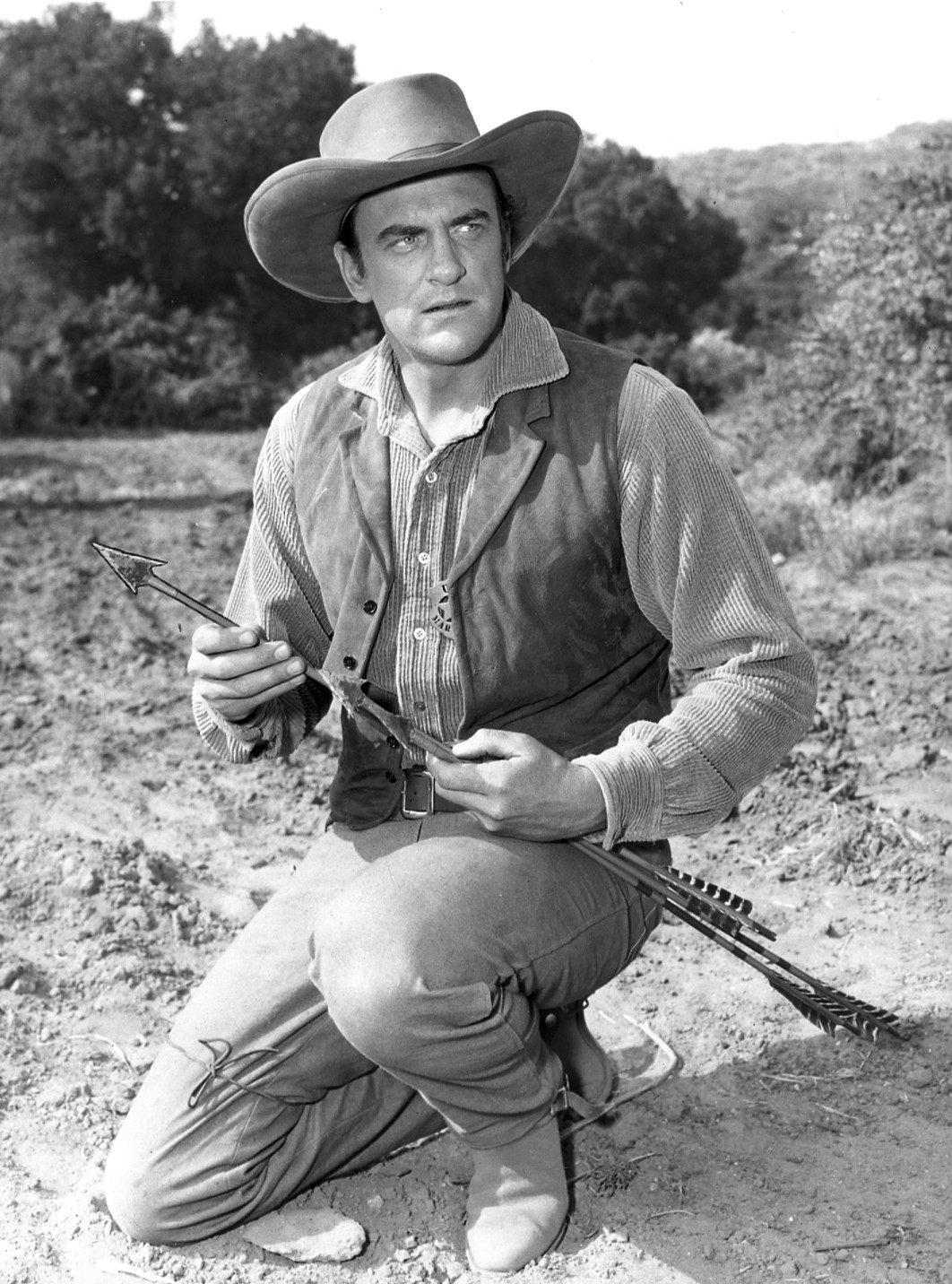
As Gunsmoke's Matt Dillon in 1956

After his discharge from the service, Arness began his entertainment career as a radio announcer at Minneapolis station WLOL in 1945.

Determined to find work in films, Arness hitchhiked to Hollywood, where he made the rounds to agencies and casting calls and soon began acting and appearing in films. He made his movie debut at RKO, which immediately changed his name from "Aurness". His film debut was as Loretta Young's (Katie Holstrom) brother, Peter Holstrom, in The Farmer's Daughter. He was credited in The Farmer's Daughter as Aurness.

Though identified as appearing in Westerns, Arness also acted in two science-fiction films, The Thing from Another World (in which he portrayed the titular character) and Them! He became a close friend of John Wayne and appeared in supporting roles in Big Jim McLain, Hondo, Island in the Sky and The Sea Chase, all starring Wayne. Arness starred in Gun the Man Down, a fast-paced Western, for Wayne's production company. He also starred in a 1988 TV remake of Wayne's 1948 classic Red River, appearing in Wayne's role as Tom Dunson.

An urban legend has it that John Wayne turned down the starring role of Matt Dillon in the classic television Western Gunsmoke, instead recommending James Arness for the part. The only true part of this story is that Wayne did indeed recommend Arness for the role; Wayne was never offered the part. Wayne appeared in a prologue to the first episode of Gunsmoke in 1955, in which he introduced Arness as Matt Dillon. The Norwegian-German Arness had to dye his naturally blond hair darker for the role. Arvo Ojala, who taught Arness to shoot, was the first of several actors in the show's opening where Marshal Dillon has a shootout with what is described as "a generic bad guy" representing all those which Dillon must deal with. Gunsmoke made Arness and his co-stars, Milburn Stone, Amanda Blake, Dennis Weaver, Ken Curtis, Burt Reynolds, and Buck Taylor world-famous, and ran for two decades, becoming the longest-running primetime drama series in American television history by the end of its run in 1975. The series' season record was tied in 2010 with the final season of Law & Order and tied again in 2018 with season 20 of Law & Order: Special Victims Unit. Unlike the latter show, Gunsmoke featured its lead character in each of its 20 seasons; Gunsmoke also aired 179 more episodes, and was in the top 10 in the ratings for 11 more seasons, for a total of 13, including four consecutive seasons at number one.

After Gunsmoke ended, Arness performed in Western-themed movies and television series, including How the West Was Won, and in five made-for-television Gunsmoke movies between 1987 and 1994. An exception was as a big-city police officer in a short-lived 1981–1982 series, McClain's Law, starring with Marshall Colt. His role as mountain man Zeb Macahan in How the West Was Won made him a cult figure in many European countries, where it became even more popular than in the United States, as the series has been rebroadcast many times across Europe.

James Arness: An Autobiography was released in September 2001, with a foreword by Reynolds (who had been a cast member of Gunsmoke for several years in the 1960s). Arness realized, "[I]f I was going to write a book about my life, I better do it now ... 'cause I'm not getting any younger."

== Personal life ==
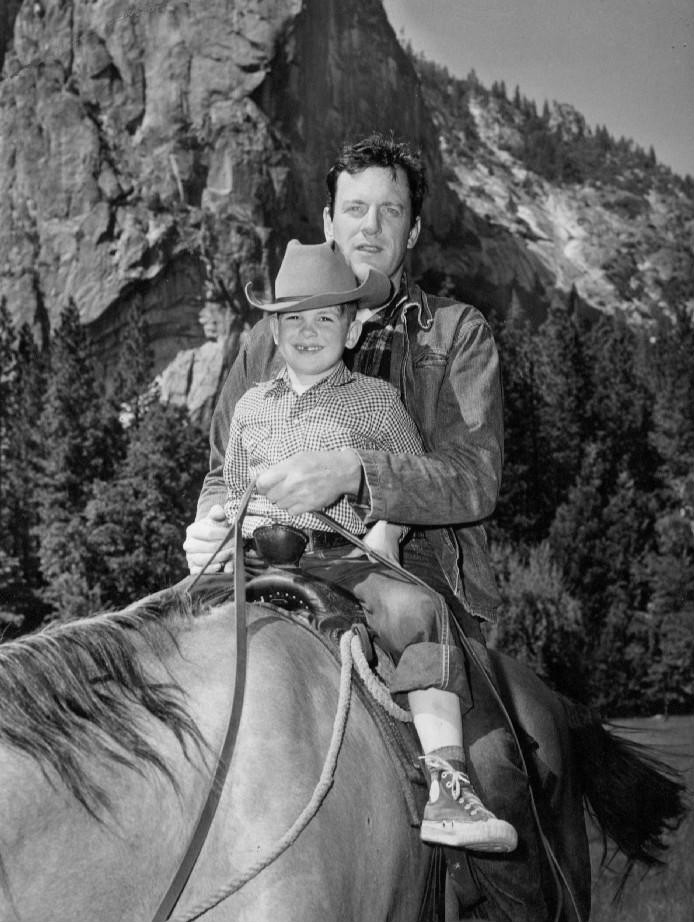
Arness with his son, Rolf, in 1959

Arness married Virginia Chapman in 1948, and adopted her son Craig (1946 – December 14, 2004). Arness and Chapman also had a son, Rolf (born February 18, 1952), and a daughter, Jenny Lee Arness (May 23, 1950 – May 12, 1975). Rolf Aurness became World Surfing Champion in 1970. Craig Arness founded the stock photography agency Westlight and also was a photographer for National Geographic. When Virginia and James divorced in 1960, Arness was granted legal custody of the children. Daughter Jenny died of an apparently deliberate drug overdose in 1975. His former wife Virginia died of an accidental drug overdose in 1977.

Four years after his divorce from Virginia Chapman, James Arness met Thordis Brandt, who was his girlfriend for six years before they ended their relationship. In 1978, Arness married Janet Surtees.

Despite his stoic character, according to Ben Bates, his Gunsmoke stunt double, Arness laughed "from his toes to the top of his head". Shooting on the Gunsmoke set was sometimes suspended because Arness got a case of the uncontrollable giggles. James Arness disdained publicity and banned reporters from the Gunsmoke set. He was said to be a shy and sensitive man who enjoyed poetry, yacht racing, and surfing. TV Guide dubbed him "The Greta Garbo of Dodge City". Buck Taylor thought so highly of Arness that he named his second son, Matthew, after Arness' character.

== Death ==
Arness died from natural causes at the age of 88 years at his Brentwood home in Los Angeles on June 3, 2011.

== Awards ==
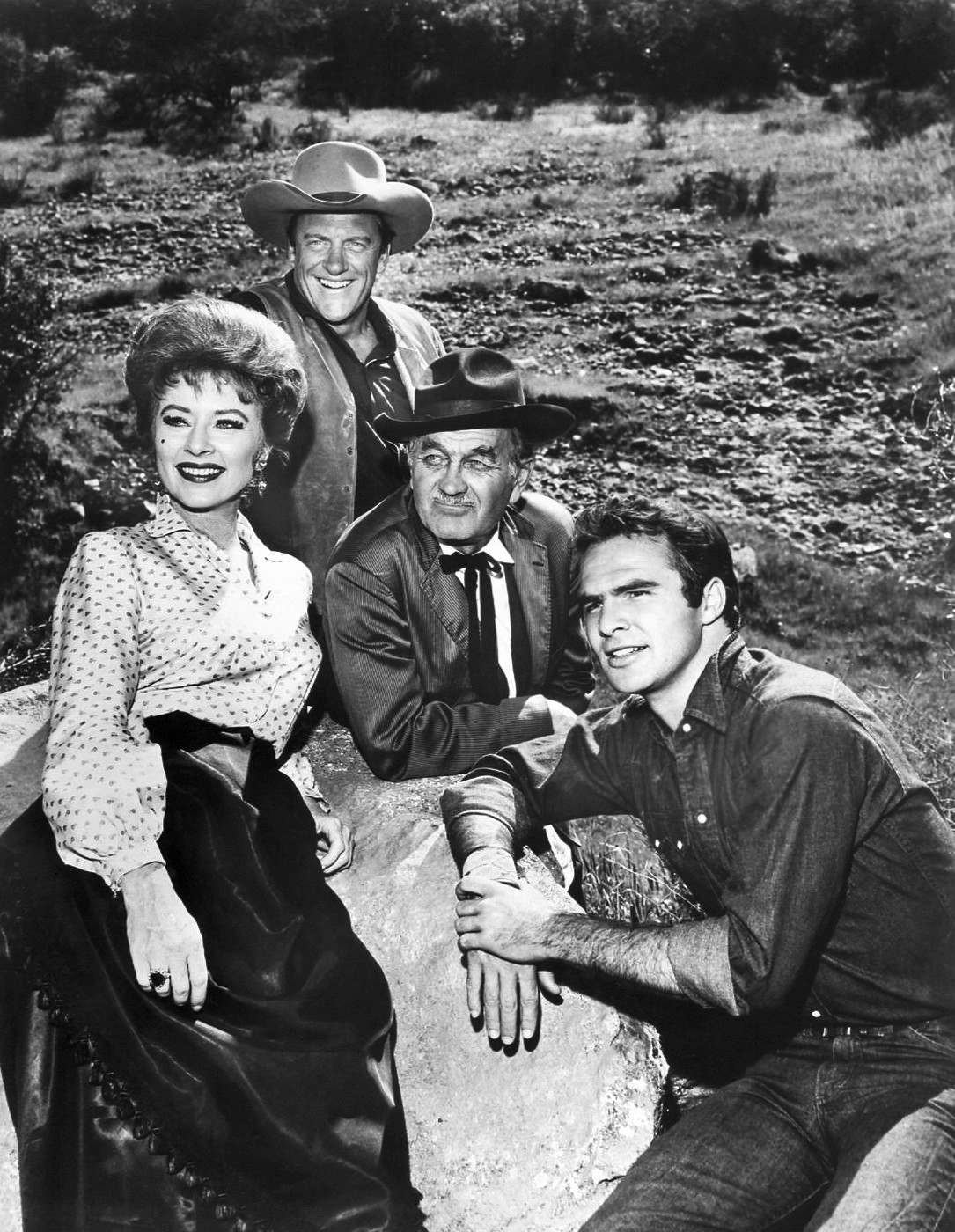
1963 Gunsmoke cast: Amanda Blake (Kitty), Arness (Matt Dillon), Milburn Stone (Doc Adams), and Burt Reynolds (Quint Asper)

For his contributions to the television industry, Arness has a star on the Hollywood Walk of Fame at 1751 Vine Street. In 1981, he was inducted into the Western Performers Hall of Fame at the National Cowboy & Western Heritage Museum in Oklahoma City. Arness was inducted into the Santa Clarita Walk of Western Stars in 2006, and gave a related TV interview.

On the 50th anniversary of television in 1989 in the United States, People magazine chose the "top 25 television stars of all time." Arness was number six. In 1996, TV Guide ranked him number 20 on its "50 Greatest TV Stars of All Time" list.

Arness was nominated for these Emmy Awards:

- 1957: Best Continuing Performance by an Actor in a Dramatic Series
- 1958: Best Continuing Performance by an Actor in a Leading Role in a Dramatic or Comedy Series
- 1959: Best Actor in a Leading Role (Continuing Character) in a Dramatic Series

== Filmography ==
=== Films ===
- The Farmer's Daughter (1947) – Peter
- Roses Are Red (1947) – Ray (credited as "James Aurness")
- The Man from Texas (1948) – Gang Member (uncredited)
- Battleground (1949) – Garby
- Stars In My Crown (1950) – Rolfe Isbell (uncredited)
- Wagon Master (1950) – Floyd Clegg
- Sierra (1950) – Little Sam Coulter (credited as "Jim Arness")
- In a Lonely Place (1950) – Young Detective (uncredited)
- Wyoming Mail (1950) – Russell
- Two Lost Worlds (1951) – Kirk Hamilton (credited as "James Aurness")
- Belle Le Grand (1951) – Belle Admirer Mine Guard at Fire (uncredited)
- The Thing from Another World (1951) – The Thing
- Double Crossbones (1951) – Bullock (uncredited)
- Cavalry Scout (1951) – Barth
- Iron Man (1951) – Alex Mallick
- The People Against O'Hara (1951) – John Fordman "Johnny" O'Hara
- Carbine Williams (1952) – Leon Williams
- The Girl in White (1952) – Matt
- Big Jim McLain (1952) – Mal Baxter
- Hellgate (1952) – George Redfield
- Horizons West (1952) – Tiny McGilligan
- The Lone Hand (1953) – Gus Varden
- Island in the Sky (1953) – Mac McMullen
- The Veils of Bagdad (1953) – Targut
- Hondo (1953) – Lennie (Army Indian Scout)
- Them! (1954) – Robert Graham
- Her Twelve Men (1954) – Ralph Munsey
- Many Rivers to Cross (1955) – Esau Hamilton
- The Sea Chase (1955) – Schlieter
- Flame of the Islands (1955) – Kelly Rand
- The First Traveling Saleslady (1956) – Joel Kingdom
- Gun the Man Down (1956) – Rem Anderson
- Alias Jesse James (1959) – Marshal Matt Dillon (uncredited)

=== Documentary ===
- America's Star – (1988) Documentary and recruiting film for the United States Marshals Service for which Arness was awarded the honorary title of US Marshal and presented with an official badge

=== Television ===
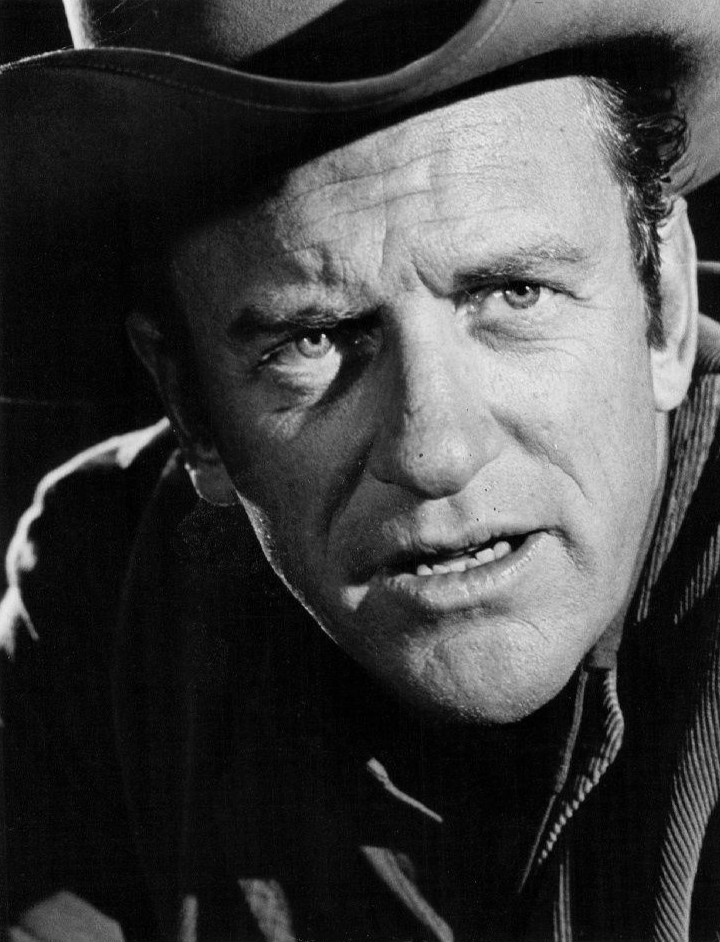
as Matt Dillon in 1969

- The Lone Ranger – Deputy Bud Titus (1950)
- Lux Video Theatre, "The Chase" (1954)
- Gunsmoke – 635 episodes – Marshal Matt Dillon (1955–1975)
- Front Row Center (1956)
- The Red Skelton Chevy Special (1959)
- The Chevrolet Golden Anniversary Show (1961)
- A Salute to Television's 25th Anniversary (1972)
- The Macahans – Zeb Macahan (1976)
- How the West Was Won – Zeb Macahan (1977–1979 TV series)
- McClain's Law – Det. Jim McClain (1981–1982 TV series)
- The Alamo: 13 Days to Glory (1987, TV movie) – Jim Bowie
- Gunsmoke: Return to Dodge (1987, TV movie) – Marshal Matt Dillon
- Red River (1988, TV Movie) – Thomas Dunson
- John Wayne Standing Tall – TV Movie – Himself /Host (1989)
- Gunsmoke II: The Last Apache (1990, TV movie) – Marshal Matt Dillon
- Gunsmoke III: To the Last Man (1992, TV movie) – Marshal Matt Dillon
- Gunsmoke IV: The Long Ride (1993, TV movie) – Marshal Matt Dillon
- Gunsmoke V: One Man's Justice (1994, TV movie) – Marshal Matt Dillon (final film role)
- Pioneers of Television – episode – Westerns – Himself / Archive footage / Marshal Matt Dillon from Gunsmoke (2011)
