= Jerry Jameson =

American film director

- Born: November 26, 1934 (age 91); United States
- Occupations: Director; editor; producer
- Years active: 1969–present

Jerry Jameson (born November 26, 1934) is an American television and film director, editor and producer.

== Biography ==
Highly prolific, he began his career in 1964 as an editor on the episode "The Song Festers" of The Andy Griffith Show, soon moving to work as an associate producer or editorial supervisor (sometimes both) on hundreds of episodes of numerous different television series, from 1965 through 1970. Jameson started directing with the 1971 episode "Trackdown" of the series Dan August, before going on to direct over 100 episodes of shows like The Six Million Dollar Man, Ironside, Dallas, Murder, She Wrote, and Walker, Texas Ranger. He also directed numerous made-for-TV movies and theatrical motion pictures, including Airport '77, Raise the Titanic, and Captive.

== Partial directorial filmography ==
- 1970: The Mod Squad
- 1971: Dan August
- 1972: Brute Corps (film)
- 1972: Search
- 1972: The Dirt Gang (film)
- 1972: The Rookies
- 1973: Cannon
- 1974: Heatwave! (TV film)
- 1974: The Bat People (film)
- 1974: The Elevator (TV film)
- 1974: Hurricane (TV film)
- 1974: Terror on the 40th Floor (TV film)
- 1974: The Six Million Dollar Man
- 1974: McCloud
- 1975: Ironside
- 1975: The Streets of San Francisco
- 1975: Hawaii Five-O
- 1975: The Secret Night Caller (TV film)
- 1975: The Deadly Tower (TV film)
- 1975: The Lives of Jenny Dolan (TV film)
- 1976: The Call of the Wild (TV film)
- 1976: The Invasion of Johnson County (TV film)
- 1977: Airport '77 (film)
- 1978: Superdome (TV film)
- 1978: A Fire in the Sky (TV film)
- 1980: Raise the Titanic (film)
- 1980: High Noon, Part II: The Return of Will Kane (TV film)
- 1980: Dan August: Murder, My Friend (TV film, an edit that used Jameson's 1971 episode "Trackdown")
- 1981: Stand by Your Man (TV film)
- 1981: Killing at Hell's Gate (TV film)
- 1982: Hotline (TV film)
- 1983: Starflight: The Plane That Couldn't Land (TV film)
- 1983: Cowboy
- 1983: This Girl for Hire
- 1984: Last of the Great Survivors
- 1984: The Cowboy and the Ballerina
- 1985: Stormin' Home (TV film)
- 1986: Heat (film) (uncredited)
- 1986: One Police Plaza (TV film)
- 1986: Magnum, P.I.
- 1987: Dallas
- 1988: Dynasty
- 1988: The Red Spider (TV film)
- 1989: Fire and Rain (TV film)
- 1992: Gunsmoke: To the Last Man (TV film)
- 1993: Gunsmoke: The Long Ride (TV film)
- 1993: Bonanza: The Return (TV film)
- 1993: Walker, Texas Ranger
- 1994: Gunsmoke: One Man's Justice (TV film)
- 1995: Touched by an Angel
- 1996: Dr. Quinn, Medicine Woman
- 1996: Gone in a Heartbeat
- 1998: Land of the Free (film)
- 2002: The Red Phone: Manhunt (TV film)
- 2003: The Red Phone: Checkmate (TV film)
- 2004: Last Flight Out (TV film)
- 2015: Captive (film)
