= List of Gunsmoke episodes =

List of Gunsmoke episodes may refer to:

- List of Gunsmoke (radio series) episodes
- List of Gunsmoke (TV series) episodes
