= List of Gunsmoke (TV series) episodes =

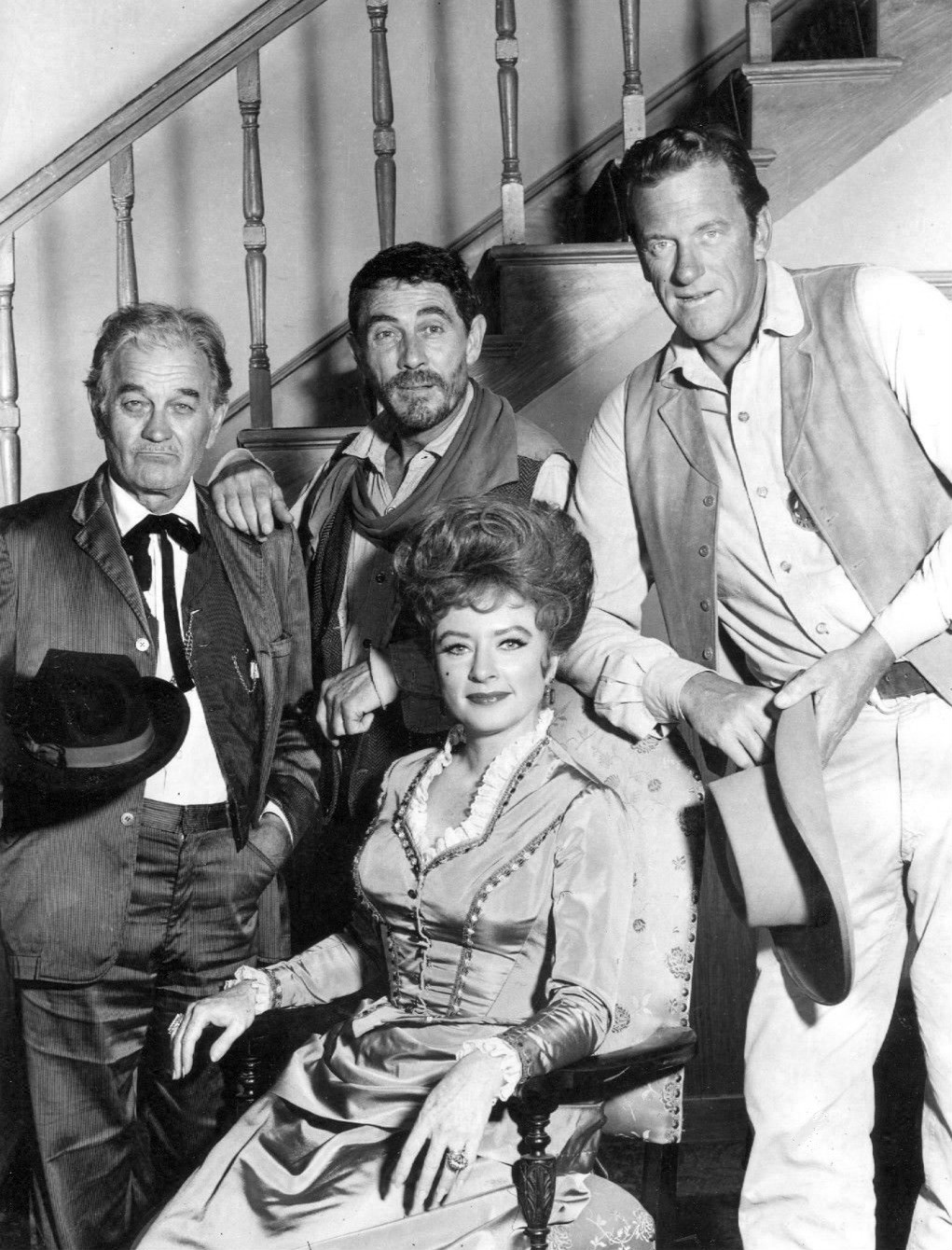
Clockwise from top: Ken Curtis (Festus), Arness (Matt), Amanda Blake (Kitty) and Milburn Stone (Doc) in 1968

Gunsmoke is an American Western television series developed by Charles Marquis Warren and based on the radio program of the same name. The series ran for 20 seasons, making it the longest-running Western in television history. The first episode aired in the United States on September 10, 1955, and the final episode aired on March 31, 1975. All episodes were broadcast in the United States by CBS. In the United Kingdom, Gunsmoke was originally broadcast under the title Gun Law.

It was originally a half-hour program filmed in black-and-white, then expanded to an hour with season seven and began filming in color in season 12. During its run, 635 episodes were broadcast, of which 233 were 30 minutes and 402 were an hour. Of the latter, 176 were in black-and-white and 226 were in color. During season two, Gunsmoke became one of the 10 most popular American television programs and moved to number one in the third season. It remained so until 1961 and stayed in the top 20 until 1964. The series returned to prominence in 1967 following a shift in programming time from Saturday to Monday night. From there, Gunsmoke remained in the top 20 for the next seven years, dropping out only in its final season which ended March 1975; CBS canceled the series two months later, with then-vice president Alan Wagner saying, "It's better to get rid of a program one year too soon than one year too late." Between 1987 and 1994, five films based on the series were aired.

Gunsmoke is set in and around Dodge City, Kansas, in the post-Civil War era and centers on United States Marshal Matt Dillon (James Arness) as he enforces law and order in the city. In its original format, the series also focuses on Dillon's friendship with three other citizens of Dodge City: Doctor Galen "Doc" Adams (Milburn Stone), the town's physician; Kitty Russell (Amanda Blake), saloon girl and later owner of the Long Branch Saloon; and Chester Goode (Dennis Weaver), Dillon's assistant. In season eight (1962–63), a fifth regular character was added to the cast: blacksmith Quint Asper (Burt Reynolds), who remained until the end of season 10 (1964–65). Dennis Weaver left the series during season nine (1963–64) and was replaced by Ken Curtis as Festus Haggen, who became deputy to Marshal Dillon. In season 11 (1965–66), another deputy, Clayton Thaddeus Greenwood (Roger Ewing), was added to the cast. Ewing's character was replaced in season 13 (1967–68) by Newly O'Brien (Buck Taylor). Amanda Blake left the series at the end of season 19 (1973–74) and was replaced in the final season by a new character, Miss Hannah, portrayed by Fran Ryan.

== Series overview ==
Season	Episodes	Originally released		Rank	Rating	Viewers (millions)
Season	Episodes	First released	Last released	Rank	Rating	Viewers (millions)
1	39	September 10, 1955	August 25, 1956	—N/a	—N/a	—N/a
2	39	September 8, 1956	June 29, 1957	8	32.7 (Note: Tied with I've Got a Secret)	12.72
3	39	September 14, 1957	June 7, 1958	1	43.1	18.06
4	39	September 13, 1958	June 13, 1959	1	39.6	17.40
5	39	September 5, 1959	June 11, 1960	1	40.3	18.43
6	38	September 3, 1960	June 17, 1961	1	37.3	17.60
7	34	September 30, 1961	May 26, 1962	3	28.3	13.74
8	38	September 15, 1962	June 1, 1963	10	27.0	13.58
9	36	September 28, 1963	June 6, 1964	20	23.5	12.12
10	36	September 26, 1964	May 29, 1965	27	22.6	11.91
11	32	September 18, 1965	May 7, 1966	30	21.3	11.47
12	29	September 17, 1966	April 15, 1967	34	19.9	11.33
13	25	September 11, 1967	March 4, 1968	4	25.5 (Note: Tied with Family Affair and Bonanza)	14.45
14	26	September 23, 1968	March 24, 1969	6	24.9	14.50
15	26	September 22, 1969	March 23, 1970	2	25.9	15.15
16	24	September 14, 1970	March 8, 1971	5	25.5	15.32
17	24	September 13, 1971	March 13, 1972	4	26.0	16.14
18	24	September 11, 1972	March 5, 1973	8	23.6 (Note: Tied with The Mary Tyler Moore Show)	15.29
19	24	September 10, 1973	April 1, 1974	15	22.1	14.63
20	24	September 9, 1974	March 31, 1975	26	20.7	14.04
Television films		September 26, 1987	February 10, 1994	—N/a	—N/a	—N/a

== Half-hour episodes (1955–1961) ==
=== Season 1 (1955–56) ===
No.	Title	Directed by	Written by	Original release date	Prod. code
1	"Matt Gets It"	Charles Marquis Warren	Story by : John Meston; Screenplay by : Charles Marquis Warren	September 10, 1955	502
2	"Hot Spell"	Charles Marquis Warren	E. Jack Neuman	September 17, 1955	503
3	"Word of Honor"	Charles Marquis Warren	Story by : John Meston; Screenplay by : Charles Marquis Warren	October 1, 1955	504
4	"Home Surgery"	Charles Marquis Warren	John Meston	October 8, 1955	505
5	"Obie Tater"	Charles Marquis Warren	Story by : John Meston; Screenplay by : Charles Marquis Warren	October 15, 1955	507
6	"Night Incident"	Charles Marquis Warren	Charles Marquis Warren	October 29, 1955	511
7	"Smoking Out the Nolans"	Charles Marquis Warren	Story by : John Meston; Screenplay by : Charles Marquis Warren	November 5, 1955	506
8	"Kite's Reward"	Charles Marquis Warren	John Meston	November 12, 1955	508
9	"The Hunter"	Charles Marquis Warren	John Dunkel	November 26, 1955	510
10	"The Queue"	Charles Marquis Warren	Story by : John Meston; Screenplay by : Sam Peckinpah	December 3, 1955	513
11	"General Parsley Smith"	Charles Marquis Warren	Story by : John Meston; Screenplay by : John Dunkel	December 10, 1955	517
12	"Magnus"	Charles Marquis Warren	John Meston	December 24, 1955	512
13	"Reed Survives"	Charles Marquis Warren	Les Crutchfield	December 31, 1955	520
14	"Professor Lute Bone"	Charles Marquis Warren	Story by : John Meston; Screenplay by : David Victor and Herbert Little, Jr.	January 7, 1956	515
15	"No Handcuffs"	Charles Marquis Warren	Story by : John Meston; Screenplay by : Les Crutchfield	January 21, 1956	519
16	"Reward for Matt"	Charles Marquis Warren	Story by : John Meston; Screenplay by : David Victor and Herbert Little, Jr.	January 28, 1956	516
17	"Robin Hood"	Charles Marquis Warren	Story by : John Meston; Screenplay by : Daniel B. Ullman	February 4, 1956	518
18	"Yorky"	Charles Marquis Warren	Story by : John Meston; Screenplay by : Sam Peckinpah	February 18, 1956	514
19	"20-20"	Charles Marquis Warren	Story by : John Meston; Screenplay by : David Victor and Herbert Little, Jr.	February 25, 1956	522
20	"Reunion '78"	Charles Marquis Warren	Harold Swanton	March 3, 1956	526
21	"Helping Hand"	Charles Marquis Warren	Story by : John Meston; Screenplay by : David Victor and Herbert Little, Jr.	March 17, 1956	509
22	"Tap Day for Kitty"	Charles Marquis Warren	Story by : John Meston; Screenplay by : John Dunkel	March 24, 1956	521
23	"Indian Scout"	Charles Marquis Warren	John Dunkel	March 31, 1956	524
24	"The Pest Hole"	Charles Marquis Warren	David Victor and Herbert Little, Jr.	April 14, 1956	525
25	"The Big Broad"	Charles Marquis Warren	Story by : John Meston; Screenplay by : David Victor and Herbert Little, Jr.	April 28, 1956	523
26	"Hack Prine"	Charles Marquis Warren	John Meston	May 12, 1956	501
27	"Cooter"	Robert Stevenson	Story by : John Meston; Screenplay by : Sam Peckinpah	May 19, 1956	527
28	"The Killer"	Robert Stevenson	Story by : John Meston; Screenplay by : John Dunkel	May 26, 1956	528
29	"Doc's Revenge"	Ted Post	John Dunkel	June 9, 1956	530
30	"The Preacher"	Robert Stevenson	Story by : John Meston; Screenplay by : John Dunkel	June 16, 1956	529
31	"How to Die for Nothing"	Ted Post	Story by : John Meston; Screenplay by : Sam Peckinpah	June 23, 1956	531
32	"Dutch George"	Robert Stevenson	John Dunkel	June 30, 1956	532
33	"Prairie Happy"	Ted Post	Story by : John Meston; Screenplay by : David Victor and Herbert Little, Jr.	July 7, 1956	534
34	"Chester's Mail Order Bride"	Robert Stevenson	David Victor and Herbert Little, Jr.	July 14, 1956	535
35	"The Guitar"	Harry Horner	Story by : John Meston; Screenplay by : Sam Peckinpah	July 21, 1956	533
36	"Cara"	Robert Stevenson	Story by : John Meston; Screenplay by : David Victor and Herbert Little, Jr.	July 28, 1956	536
37	"Mr. and Mrs. Amber"	Ted Post	Story by : John Meston; Screenplay by : David Victor and Herbert Little, Jr.	August 4, 1956	537
38	"Unmarked Grave"	Ted Post	David Victor and Herbert Little, Jr.	August 18, 1956	538
39	"Alarm at Pleasant Valley"	Ted Post	John Dunkel	August 25, 1956	539

=== Season 2 (1956–57) ===
No. overall	No. in season	Title	Directed by	Written by	Original release date
40	1	"Cow Doctor"	Andrew V. McLaglen	Story by : John Meston; Screenplay by : John Dunkel	September 8, 1956
41	2	"Brush at Elkader"	Ted Post	Story by : John Meston; Screenplay by : Les Crutchfield	September 15, 1956
42	3	"Custer"	Ted Post	Story by : John Meston; Screenplay by : Gil Doud	September 22, 1956
43	4	"The Round Up"	Ted Post	Story by : John Meston; Screenplay by : Sam Peckinpah	September 29, 1956
44	5	"Young Man with a Gun"	Christian Nyby	Story by : John Meston; Screenplay by : Winston Miller	October 20, 1956
45	6	"Indian White"	Ted Post	Story by : Tom Hanley; Screenplay by : David Victor and Herbert Little, Jr.	October 27, 1956
46	7	"How to Cure a Friend"	Ted Post	Story by : John Meston; Screenplay by : Winston Miller	November 10, 1956
47	8	"Legal Revenge"	Andrew V. McLaglen	Story by : John Meston; Screenplay by : Sam Peckinpah	November 17, 1956
48	9	"The Mistake"	Andrew V. McLaglen	Story by : John Meston; Screenplay by : Gil Doud	November 24, 1956
49	10	"Greater Love"	Ted Post	Story by : John Meston; Screenplay by : Winston Miller	December 1, 1956
50	11	"No Indians"	Ted Post	Story by : John Meston; Screenplay by : John Dunkel	December 8, 1956
51	12	"Spring Term"	Ted Post	Story by : John Meston; Screenplay by : William F. Leicester	December 15, 1956
52	13	"Poor Pearl"	Andrew V. McLaglen	Story by : John Meston; Screenplay by : Sam Peckinpah	December 22, 1956
53	14	"Cholera"	Andrew V. McLaglen	Story by : John Meston; Screenplay by : Les Crutchfield	December 29, 1956
54	15	"Pucket's New Year"	Andrew V. McLaglen	John Meston	January 5, 1957
55	16	"The Cover Up"	William D. Russell	Story by : John Meston; Screenplay by : William N. Robson	January 12, 1957
56	17	"Sins of the Father"	Andrew V. McLaglen	Story by : John Meston; Screenplay by : John Dunkel	January 19, 1957
57	18	"Kick Me"	Andrew V. McLaglen	Story by : John Meston; Screenplay by : Endre Bohem and Louis Vittes	January 26, 1957
58	19	"Executioner"	Andrew V. McLaglen	Story by : John Meston; Screenplay by : Gil Doud	February 2, 1957
59	20	"Gone Straight"	Ted Post	Story by : John Meston; Screenplay by : Les Crutchfield	February 9, 1957
60	21	"Bloody Hands"	Andrew V. McLaglen	John Meston	February 16, 1957
61	22	"Skid Row"	Ted Post	Story by : John Meston; Screenplay by : Gil Doud	February 23, 1957
62	23	"Sweet and Sour"	Andrew V. McLaglen	John Meston	March 2, 1957
63	24	"Cain"	Ted Post	John Meston	March 9, 1957
64	25	"Bureaucrat"	Ted Post	Story by : John Meston; Teleplay by : William F. Leicester	March 16, 1957
65	26	"Last Fling"	Andrew V. McLaglen	John Meston	March 23, 1957
66	27	"Chester's Murder"	Ted Post	John Meston	March 30, 1957
67	28	"The Photographer"	William D. Russell	John Dunkel	April 6, 1957
68	29	"Wrong Man"	Andrew V. McLaglen	John Meston	April 13, 1957
69	30	"Big Girl Lost"	Ted Post	John Meston	April 20, 1957
70	31	"What the Whiskey Drummer Heard"	Andrew V. McLaglen	Story by : John Meston; Teleplay by : Gil Doud	April 27, 1957
71	32	"Cheap Labor"	Andrew V. McLaglen	John Meston	May 4, 1957
72	33	"Moon"	William D. Russell	John Meston	May 11, 1957
73	34	"Who Lives by the Sword"	Andrew V. McLaglen	John Meston	May 18, 1957
74	35	"Uncle Oliver"	Andrew V. McLaglen	John Meston	May 25, 1957
75	36	"Daddy-O"	Andrew V. McLaglen	John Meston	June 1, 1957
76	37	"The Man Who Would Be Marshal"	William D. Russell	Story by : John Meston; Screenplay by : David Victor and Herbert Little, Jr.	June 15, 1957
77	38	"Liar from Blackhawk"	Andrew V. McLaglen	John Meston	June 22, 1957
78	39	"Jealousy"	Andrew V. McLaglen	Story by : John Meston; Screenplay by : Sam Peckinpah	June 29, 1957

=== Season 3 (1957–58) ===
No. overall	No. in season	Title	Directed by	Written by	Original release date
79	1	"Crack-Up"	Ted Post	John Meston	September 14, 1957
80	2	"Gun for Chester"	Louis King	John Meston	September 21, 1957
81	3	"Blood Money"	Louis King	John Meston	September 28, 1957
82	4	"Kitty's Outlaw"	Andrew V. McLaglen	Story by : John Meston; Screenplay by : Kathleen Hite	October 5, 1957
83	5	"Potato Road"	Ted Post	John Meston	October 12, 1957
84	6	"Jesse"	Andrew V. McLaglen	John Meston	October 19, 1957
85	7	"Mavis McCloud"	Buzz Kulik	Story by : John Meston; Screenplay by : Kathleen Hite	October 26, 1957
86	8	"Born to Hang"	Buzz Kulik	John Meston	November 2, 1957
87	9	"Romeo"	Ted Post	John Meston	November 9, 1957
88	10	"Never Pester Chester"	Richard Whorf	John Meston	November 16, 1957
89	11	"Fingered"	James Sheldon	John Meston	November 23, 1957
90	12	"How to Kill a Woman"	John Rich	Story by : John Meston; Screenplay by : David S. Peckinpah^{[A]}	November 30, 1957
91	13	"Cows and Cribs"	Richard Whorf	Story by : John Meston; Screenplay by : Kathleen Hite	December 7, 1957
92	14	"Doc's Reward"	Richard Whorf	John Meston	December 14, 1957
93	15	"Kitty Lost"	Ted Post	John Meston	December 21, 1957
94	16	"Twelfth Night"	John Rich	John Meston	December 28, 1957
95	17	"Joe Phy"	Ted Post	John Meston	January 4, 1958
96	18	"Buffalo Man"	Ted Post	Story by : John Meston; Screenplay by : Les Crutchfield	January 11, 1958
97	19	"Kitty Caught"	Richard Whorf	John Meston	January 18, 1958
98	20	"Claustrophobia"	Ted Post	John Meston	January 25, 1958
99	21	"Ma Tennis"	Buzz Kulik	John Meston	February 1, 1958
100	22	"Sunday Supplement"	Richard Whorf	John Meston	February 8, 1958
101	23	"Wild West"	Richard Whorf	John Meston	February 15, 1958
102	24	"The Cabin"	John Rich	John Meston	February 22, 1958
103	25	"Dirt"	Ted Post	Story by : John Meston; Screenplay by : David S. Peckinpah^{[A]}	March 1, 1958
104	26	"Dooley Surrenders"	John Rich	John Meston	March 8, 1958
105	27	"Joke's on Us"	Ted Post	John Meston	March 15, 1958
106	28	"Bottleman"	John Rich	John Meston	March 22, 1958
107	29	"Laughing Gas"	Ted Post	James Fonda	March 29, 1958
108	30	"Texas Cowboys"	John Rich	John Meston	April 5, 1958
109	31	"Amy's Good Deed"	John Rich	Story by : John Meston; Screenplay by : Kathleen Hite	April 12, 1958
110	32	"Hanging Man"	John Rich	John Meston	April 19, 1958
111	33	"Innocent Broad"	John Rich	Story by : John Meston; Screenplay by : Kathleen Hite	April 26, 1958
112	34	"The Big Con"	John Rich	John Meston	May 3, 1958
113	35	"Widow's Mite"	Ted Post	John Meston	May 10, 1958
114	36	"Chester's Hanging"	Ted Post	John Meston	May 17, 1958
115	37	"Carmen"	Ted Post	John Meston	May 24, 1958
116	38	"Overland Express"	Seymour Berns	John Meston	May 31, 1958
117	39	"The Gentleman"	Ted Post	John Meston	June 7, 1958

=== Season 4 (1958–59) ===
No. overall	No. in season	Title	Directed by	Written by	Original release date
118	1	"Matt for Murder"	Richard Whorf	John Meston	September 13, 1958
119	2	"The Patsy"	Richard Whorf	Story by : John Meston; Screenplay by : Les Crutchfield	September 20, 1958
120	3	"Gunsmuggler"	Richard Whorf	Story by : John Meston; Screenplay by : Les Crutchfield	September 27, 1958
121	4	"Monopoly"	Seymour Berns	Story by : John Meston; Screenplay by : Les Crutchfield	October 4, 1958
122	5	"Letter of the Law"	Richard Whorf	Story by : John Meston; Screenplay by : Les Crutchfield	October 11, 1958
123	6	"Thoroughbreds"	Richard Whorf	John Meston	October 18, 1958
124	7	"Stage Hold-Up"	Ted Post	Story by : John Meston; Teleplay by : Les Crutchfield	October 25, 1958
125	8	"Lost Rifle"	Richard Whorf	John Meston	November 1, 1958
126	9	"Land Deal"	Ted Post	Story by : John Meston; Screenplay by : Les Crutchfield	November 8, 1958
127	10	"Lynching Man"	Richard Whorf	John Meston	November 15, 1958
128	11	"How to Kill a Friend"	Richard Whorf	John Meston	November 22, 1958
129	12	"Grass"	Richard Whorf	John Meston	November 29, 1958
130	13	"The Cast"	Jesse Hibbs	John Meston	December 6, 1958
131	14	"Robber Bridegroom"	Richard Whorf	John Meston	December 13, 1958
132	15	"Snakebite"	Ted Post	John Meston	December 20, 1958
133	16	"Gypsum Hills Feud"	Richard Whorf	Story by : John Meston; Screenplay by : Les Crutchfield	December 27, 1958
134	17	"Young Love"	Seymour Berns	John Meston	January 3, 1959
135	18	"Marshal Proudfoot"	Jesse Hibbs	Story by : Tom Hanley; Screenplay by : John Meston	January 10, 1959
136	19	"Passive Resistance"	Ted Post	John Meston	January 17, 1959
137	20	"Love of a Good Woman"	Arthur Hiller	Story by : John Meston; Screenplay by : Les Crutchfield	January 24, 1959
138	21	"Jayhawkers"	Andrew V. McLaglen	John Meston	January 31, 1959
139	22	"Kitty's Rebellion"	Jesse Hibbs	Story by : Marian Clark; Screenplay by : John Meston	February 7, 1959
140	23	"Sky"	Ted Post	Story by : John Meston; Screenplay by : Les Crutchfield	February 14, 1959
141	24	"Doc Quits"	Edward Ludlum	John Meston	February 21, 1959
142	25	"The Bear"	Jesse Hibbs	John Meston	February 28, 1959
143	26	"The Coward"	Jesse Hibbs	John Meston	March 7, 1959
144	27	"The F.U."	Andrew V. McLaglen	John Meston	March 14, 1959
145	28	"Wind"	Arthur Hiller	John Meston	March 21, 1959
146	29	"Fawn"	Andrew V. McLaglen	John Meston	April 4, 1959
147	30	"Renegade White"	Andrew V. McLaglen	Story by : John Meston; Screenplay by : Les Crutchfield	April 11, 1959
148	31	"Murder Warrant"	Andrew V. McLaglen	John Meston	April 18, 1959
149	32	"Change of Heart"	Andrew V. McLaglen	John Meston	April 25, 1959
150	33	"Buffalo Hunter"	Ted Post	John Meston	May 2, 1959
151	34	"The Choice"	Ted Post	John Meston	May 9, 1959
152	35	"There Never Was a Horse"	Andrew V. McLaglen	John Meston	May 16, 1959
153	36	"Print Asper"	Ted Post	John Meston	May 23, 1959
154	37	"The Constable"	Arthur Hiller	John Meston	May 30, 1959
155	38	"Blue Horse"	Andrew V. McLaglen and Ted Post	Story by : Marian Clark; Screenplay by : John Meston	June 6, 1959
156	39	"Cheyennes"	Ted Post	John Meston	June 13, 1959

=== Season 5 (1959–60) ===
No. overall	No. in season	Title	Directed by	Written by	Original release date
157	1	"Target"	Andrew V. McLaglen	Story by : Les Crutchfield; Screenplay by : John Meston	September 5, 1959
158	2	"Kitty's Injury"	Buzz Kulik	Story by : Marian Clark; Screenplay by : John Meston	September 19, 1959
159	3	"Horse Deal"	Andrew V. McLaglen	John Meston	September 26, 1959
160	4	"Johnny Red"	Buzz Kulik	Story by : Les Crutchfield; Screenplay by : John Meston	October 3, 1959
161	5	"Tail to the Wind"	Christian Nyby	Story by : Les Crutchfield; Screenplay by : John Meston	October 10, 1959
162	6	"Annie Oakley"	Jesse Hibbs	John Meston	October 17, 1959
163	7	"Kangaroo"	Andrew V. McLaglen	John Meston	October 24, 1959
164	8	"Saludos"	Andrew V. McLaglen	Story by : Les Crutchfield; Screenplay by : John Meston	October 31, 1959
165	9	"Brother Whelp"	R.G. Springsteen	Story by : Les Crutchfield; Screenplay by : John Meston	November 7, 1959
166	10	"The Boots"	Jesse Hibbs	John Meston	November 14, 1959
167	11	"Odd Man Out"	Andrew V. McLaglen	Story by : Les Crutchfield; Screenplay by : John Meston	November 21, 1959
168	12	"Miguel's Daughter"	Andrew V. McLaglen	Story by : Marian Clark; Screenplay by : John Meston	November 28, 1959
169	13	"Box o' Rocks"	R.G. Springsteen	Les Crutchfield	December 5, 1959
170	14	"False Witness"	Ted Post	Story by : Marian Clark; Screenplay by : John Meston	December 12, 1959
171	15	"Tag, You're It"	Jesse Hibbs	Les Crutchfield	December 19, 1959
172	16	"Thick 'n' Thin"	Stuart Heisler	Story by : Les Crutchfield; Screenplay by : John Meston	December 26, 1959
173	17	"Groat's Grudge"	Andrew V. McLaglen	Story by : Marian Clark; Screenplay by : John Meston	January 2, 1960
174	18	"Big Tom"	Andrew V. McLaglen	Story by : Marian Clark; Screenplay by : John Meston	January 9, 1960
175	19	"Till Death Do Us"	Jean Yarbrough	Les Crutchfield	January 16, 1960
176	20	"The Tragedian"	Arthur Hiller	Story by : Les Crutchfield; Screenplay by : John Meston	January 23, 1960
177	21	"Hinka Do"	Andrew V. McLaglen	Les Crutchfield	January 30, 1960
178	22	"Doc Judge"	Arthur Hiller	John Meston	February 6, 1960
179	23	"Moo Moo Raid"	Andrew V. McLaglen	Story by : Les Crutchfield; Screenplay by : John Meston	February 13, 1960
180	24	"Kitty's Killing"	Arthur Hiller	Story by : Marian Clark; Screenplay by : John Meston	February 20, 1960
181	25	"Jailbait Janet"	Jesse Hibbs	Les Crutchfield	February 27, 1960
182	26	"Unwanted Deputy"	Andrew V. McLaglen	Story by : Marian Clark; Screenplay by : John Meston	March 5, 1960
183	27	"Where'd They Go"	Jesse Hibbs	Story by : Les Crutchfield; Screenplay by : John Meston	March 12, 1960
184	28	"Crowbait Bob"	Andrew V. McLaglen	Les Crutchfield	March 26, 1960
185	29	"Colleen So Green"	Jean Yarbrough	Story by : Les Crutchfield; Screenplay by : John Meston	April 2, 1960
186	30	"The Ex-Urbanites"	Andrew V. McLaglen	John Meston	April 9, 1960
187	31	"I Thee Wed"	Jesse Hibbs	Story by : Les Crutchfield; Screenplay by : John Meston	April 16, 1960
188	32	"The Lady Killer"	Andrew V. McLaglen	John Meston	April 23, 1960
189	33	"Gentleman's Disagreement"	Jesse Hibbs	Les Crutchfield	April 30, 1960
190	34	"Speak Me Fair"	Andrew V. McLaglen	Les Crutchfield	May 7, 1960
191	35	"Belle's Back"	Jesse Hibbs	Les Crutchfield	May 14, 1960
192	36	"The Bobsy Twins"	Jesse Hibbs	John Meston	May 21, 1960
193	37	"Old Flame"	Jesse Hibbs	Story by : Marian Clark; Screenplay by : John Meston	May 28, 1960
194	38	"The Deserter"	Arthur Hiller	Story by : Marian Clark; Screenplay by : John Meston	June 4, 1960
195	39	"Cherry Red"	Andrew V. McLaglen	Les Crutchfield	June 11, 1960

=== Season 6 (1960–61) ===
No. overall	No. in season	Title	Directed by	Written by	Original release date
196	1	"Friend's Pay-Off"	Jesse Hibbs	Story by : Marian Clark; Screenplay by : John Meston	September 3, 1960
197	2	"The Blacksmith"	Andrew V. McLaglen	Story by : Norman MacDonnell; Screenplay by : John Meston	September 17, 1960
198	3	"Small Water"	Andrew V. McLaglen	John Meston	September 24, 1960
199	4	"Say Uncle"	Andrew V. McLaglen	John Meston	October 1, 1960
200	5	"Shooting Stopover"	Andrew V. McLaglen	Story by : Marian Clark; Screenplay by : John Meston	October 8, 1960
201	6	"The Peace Officer"	Jesse Hibbs	Story by : Norman MacDonnell; Screenplay by : John Meston	October 15, 1960
202	7	"Don Matteo"	Jesse Hibbs	Story by : Marian Clark; Screenplay by : John Meston	October 22, 1960
203	8	"The Worm"	Arthur Hiller	John Meston	October 29, 1960
204	9	"The Badge"	Andrew V. McLaglen	Story by : Marian Clark; Screenplay by : John Meston	November 12, 1960
205	10	"Distant Drummer"	Arthur Hiller	Story by : Marian Clark; Screenplay by : John Meston	November 19, 1960
206	11	"Ben Tolliver's Stud"	Andrew V. McLaglen	Story by : Norman MacDonnell; Screenplay by : John Meston	November 26, 1960
207	12	"No Chip"	Jean Yarbrough	John Meston	December 3, 1960
208	13	"The Wake"	Gerald Mayer	John Meston	December 10, 1960
209	14	"The Cook"	Ted Post	John Meston	December 17, 1960
210	15	"Old Fool"	Ted Post	John Meston	December 24, 1960
211	16	"Brother Love"	Franklin Adreon	John Meston	December 31, 1960
212	17	"Bad Sheriff"	Andrew V. McLaglen	John Meston	January 7, 1961
213	18	"Unloaded Gun"	Jesse Hibbs	Story by : Marian Clark; Screenplay by : John Meston	January 14, 1961
214	19	"Tall Trapper"	Harry Harris Jr.	Story by : Marian Clark; Screenplay by : John Meston	January 21, 1961
215	20	"Love Thy Neighbor"	Dennis Weaver	John Meston	January 28, 1961
216	21	"Bad Seed"	Harry Harris	Story by : Norman MacDonnell; Screenplay by : John Meston	February 4, 1961
217	22	"Kitty Shot"	Andrew V. McLaglen	John Meston	February 11, 1961
218	23	"About Chester"	Alan Crosland Jr.	Story by : Frank Paris; Screenplay by : John Meston	February 25, 1961
219	24	"Harriet"	Gene Fowler Jr.	John Meston	March 4, 1961
220	25	"Potshot"	Harry Harris	John Meston	March 11, 1961
221	26	"Old Faces"	Harry Harris	John Meston	March 18, 1961
222	27	"Big Man"	Gerald Mayer	John Meston	March 25, 1961
223	28	"Little Girl"	Dennis Weaver	Story by : Kathleen Hite; Screenplay by : John Meston	April 1, 1961
224	29	"Stolen Horses"	Andrew V. McLaglen	Story by : Norman MacDonnell; Screenplay by : John Meston	April 8, 1961
225	30	"Minnie"	Harry Harris	John Meston	April 15, 1961
226	31	"Bless Me Till I Die"	Ted Post	Story by : Ray Kemper; Screenplay by : John Meston	April 22, 1961
227	32	"Long Hours, Short Pay"	Andrew V. McLaglen	John Meston	April 29, 1961
228	33	"Hard Virtue"	Dennis Weaver	John Meston	May 6, 1961
229	34	"The Imposter"	Byron Paul	Story by : Kathleen Hite; Screenplay by : John Meston	May 13, 1961
230	35	"Chester's Dilemma"	Ted Post	Story by : Vic Perrin; Screenplay by : John Meston	May 20, 1961
231	36	"The Love of Money"	Ted Post	John Meston	May 27, 1961
232	37	"Melinda Miles"	William D. Faralla	John Meston	June 3, 1961
233	38	"Colorado Sheriff"	Jesse Hibbs	John Meston	June 17, 1961

== One-hour black-and-white episodes (1961–1966) ==
=== Season 7 (1961–62) ===
No. overall	No. in season	Title	Directed by	Written by	Original release date
234	1	"Perce"	Harry Harris	John Meston	September 30, 1961
235	2	"Old Yellow Boots"	Ted Post	John Meston	October 7, 1961
236	3	"Miss Kitty"	Harry Harris	Kathleen Hite	October 14, 1961
237	4	"Harpe's Blood"	Andrew V. McLaglen	John Meston	October 21, 1961
238	5	"All That"	Andrew V. McLaglen	John Meston	October 28, 1961
239	6	"Long, Long Trail"	Andrew V. McLaglen	Kathleen Hite	November 4, 1961
240	7	"The Squaw"	Gerald Mayer	John Dunkel	November 11, 1961
241	8	"Chesterland"	Ted Post	Kathleen Hite	November 18, 1961
242	9	"Milly"	Richard Whorf	Story by : Hal Moffett; Screenplay by : John Meston	November 25, 1961
243	10	"Indian Ford"	Andrew V. McLaglen	John Dunkel	December 2, 1961
244	11	"Apprentice Doc"	Harry Harris	Kathleen Hite	December 9, 1961
245	12	"Nina's Revenge"	Tay Garnett	John Meston	December 16, 1961
246	13	"Marry Me"	Dennis Weaver	Kathleen Hite	December 23, 1961
247	14	"A Man a Day"	Harry Harris	John Meston	December 30, 1961
248	15	"The Do-Badder"	Andrew V. McLaglen	John Meston	January 6, 1962
249	16	"Lacey"	Harry Harris	Kathleen Hite	January 13, 1962
250	17	"Cody's Code"	Andrew V. McLaglen	John Meston	January 20, 1962
251	18	"Old Dan"	Andrew V. McLaglen	Kathleen Hite	January 27, 1962
252	19	"Catawomper"	Harry Harris	Story by : James Favor; Screenplay by : John Meston	February 10, 1962
253	20	"Half Straight"	Ted Post	John Meston	February 17, 1962
254	21	"He Learned About Women"	Tay Garnett	Story by : John Rosser; Screenplay by : John Meston	February 24, 1962
255	22	"The Gallows"	Andrew V. McLaglen	John Meston	March 3, 1962
256	23	"Reprisal"	Harry Harris	John Meston	March 10, 1962
257	24	"Coventry"	Christian Nyby	John Meston	March 17, 1962
258	25	"The Widow"	Ted Post	John Dunkel	March 24, 1962
259	26	"Durham Bull"	Harry Harris	Story by : Jack Shettlesworth; Screenplay by : John Meston	March 31, 1962
260	27	"Wagon Girls"	Andrew V. McLaglen	John Meston	April 7, 1962
261	28	"The Dealer"	Harry Harris	Story by : Les Crutchfield; Screenplay by : John Dunkel	April 14, 1962
262	29	"The Summons"	Andrew V. McLaglen	Story by : Marian Clark; Screenplay by : Kathleen Hite	April 21, 1962
263	30	"The Dreamers"	Andrew V. McLaglen	John Meston	April 28, 1962
264	31	"Cale"	Harry Harris	Kathleen Hite	May 5, 1962
265	32	"Chester's Indian"	Joseph Sargent	Kathleen Hite	May 12, 1962
266	33	"The Prisoner"	Andrew V. McLaglen	Robert E. Thompson	May 19, 1962
267	34	"The Boys"	Harry Harris	John Meston	May 26, 1962

=== Season 8 (1962–63) ===
No. overall	No. in season	Title	Directed by	Written by	Original release date
268	1	"The Search"	Harry Harris	Kathleen Hite	September 15, 1962
269	2	"Call Me Dodie"	Harry Harris	Kathleen Hite	September 22, 1962
270	3	"Quint Asper Comes Home"	Andrew V. McLaglen	John Meston	September 29, 1962
271	4	"Root Down"	Sobey Martin	Kathleen Hite	October 6, 1962
272	5	"Jenny"	Andrew V. McLaglen	John Meston	October 13, 1962
273	6	"Collie's Free"	Harry Harris	Kathleen Hite	October 20, 1962
274	7	"The Ditch"	Harry Harris	Les Crutchfield	October 27, 1962
275	8	"The Trappers"	Andrew V. McLaglen	John Dunkel	November 3, 1962
276	9	"Phoebe Strunk"	Andrew V. McLaglen	John Meston	November 10, 1962
277	10	"The Hunger"	Harry Harris	Jack Curtis	November 17, 1962
278	11	"Abe Blocker"	Andrew V. McLaglen	John Meston	November 24, 1962
279	12	"The Way It Is"	Harry Harris	Kathleen Hite	December 1, 1962
280	13	"Us Haggens"	Andrew V. McLaglen	Les Crutchfield	December 8, 1962
281	14	"Uncle Sunday"	Joseph Sargent	John Meston	December 15, 1962
282	15	"False Front"	Andrew V. McLaglen	Story by : Hal Moffett; Screenplay by : John Meston	December 22, 1962
283	16	"Old Comrade"	Harry Harris	John Dunkel	December 29, 1962
284	17	"Louie Pheeters"	Harry Harris	John Meston	January 5, 1963
285	18	"The Renegades"	Andrew V. McLaglen	John Meston	January 12, 1963
286	19	"Cotter's Girl"	Harry Harris	Kathleen Hite	January 19, 1963
287	20	"The Bad One"	Charles Martin	Gwen Bagni	January 26, 1963
288	21	"The Cousin"	Harry Harris	Story by : Marian Clark; Screenplay by : Kathleen Hite	February 2, 1963
289	22	"Shona"	Ted Post	John Meston	February 9, 1963
290	23	"Ash"	Harry Harris	John Meston	February 16, 1963
291	24	"Blind Man's Bluff"	Ted Post	John Meston	February 23, 1963
292	25	"Quint's Indian"	Fred Jackman, Jr.	Story by : Marian Clark; Screenplay by : John Meston	March 2, 1963
293	26	"Anybody Can Kill a Marshal"	Harry Harris	Kathleen Hite	March 9, 1963
294	27	"Two of a Kind"	Andrew V. McLaglen	Merwin Gerard	March 16, 1963
295	28	"I Call Him Wonder"	Harry Harris	Kathleen Hite	March 23, 1963
296	29	"With a Smile"	Andrew V. McLaglen	Story by : Bud Furillo & George Main; Screenplay by : John Meston	March 30, 1963
297	30	"The Far Places"	Harry Harris	John Dunkel	April 6, 1963
298	31	"Panacea Sykes"	William Conrad	Kathleen Hite	April 13, 1963
299	32	"Tell Chester"	Joseph Sargent	Frank Paris	April 20, 1963
300	33	"Quint-Cident"	Andrew V. McLaglen	Kathleen Hite	April 27, 1963
301	34	"Old York"	Harry Harris	John Meston	May 4, 1963
302	35	"Daddy Went Away"	Joseph Sargent	Story by : John Rosser; Screenplay by : Kathleen Hite	May 11, 1963
303	36	"The Odyssey of Jubal Tanner"	Andrew V. McLaglen	Paul Savage	May 18, 1963
304	37	"Jeb"	Harry Harris	Paul Savage	May 25, 1963
305	38	"The Quest for Asa Janin"	Andrew V. McLaglen	Paul Savage	June 1, 1963

=== Season 9 (1963–64) ===
No. overall	No. in season	Title	Directed by	Written by	Original release date
306	1	"Kate Heller"	Harry Harris	Kathleen Hite	September 28, 1963
307	2	"Lover Boy"	Andrew V. McLaglen	John Meston	October 5, 1963
308	3	"Legends Don't Sleep"	Harry Harris	Kathleen Hite	October 12, 1963
309	4	"Tobe"	John English	Paul Savage	October 19, 1963
310	5	"Easy Come"	Andrew V. McLaglen	John Meston	October 26, 1963
311	6	"My Sister's Keeper"	Harry Harris	Kathleen Hite	November 2, 1963
312	7	"Quint's Trail"	Harry Harris	Kathleen Hite	November 9, 1963
313	8	"Carter Caper"	Jerry Hopper	John Meston	November 16, 1963
314	9	"Ex-Con"	Thomas Carr	John Meston	November 30, 1963
315	10	"Extradition"	John English	Antony Ellis	December 7, 1963
316	11	"Extradition"	John English	Antony Ellis	December 14, 1963
317	12	"The Magician"	Harry Harris	John A. Kneubuhl	December 21, 1963
318	13	"Pa Hack's Brood"	Jerry Hopper	Paul Savage	December 28, 1963
319	14	"The Glory and the Mud"	Jerry Hopper	Gwen Bagni	January 4, 1964
320	15	"Dry Well"	Harry Harris	John Meston	January 11, 1964
321	16	"Prairie Wolfer"	Andrew V. McLaglen	John Dunkel	January 18, 1964
322	17	"Friend"	Harry Harris	Kathleen Hite	January 25, 1964
323	18	"Once a Haggen"	Andrew V. McLaglen	Les Crutchfield	February 1, 1964
324	19	"No Hands"	Andrew V. McLaglen	John Meston	February 8, 1964
325	20	"Mayblossom"	Andrew V. McLaglen	Kathleen Hite	February 15, 1964
326	21	"The Bassops"	Andrew V. McLaglen	Tom Hanley	February 22, 1964
327	22	"The Kite"	Andrew V. McLaglen	John Meston	February 29, 1964
328	23	"Comanches Is Soft"	Harry Harris	Kathleen Hite	March 7, 1964
329	24	"Father's Love"	Harry Harris	John Meston	March 14, 1964
330	25	"Now That April's Here"	Andrew V. McLaglen	Les Crutchfield	March 21, 1964
331	26	"Caleb"	Harry Harris	Paul Savage	March 28, 1964
332	27	"Owney Tupper Had a Daughter"	Jerry Hopper	Paul Savage	April 4, 1964
333	28	"Bently"	Harry Harris	John Kneubuhl	April 11, 1964
334	29	"Kitty Cornered"	John Brahm	Kathleen Hite	April 18, 1964
335	30	"The Promoter"	Andrew V. McLaglen	John Meston	April 25, 1964
336	31	"Trip West"	Harry Harris	John Dunkel	May 2, 1964
337	32	"Scot Free"	Harry Harris	Kathleen Hite	May 9, 1964
338	33	"The Warden"	Andrew V. McLaglen	Les Crutchfield	May 16, 1964
339	34	"Homecoming"	Harry Harris	Shimon Bar-David^{[B]}	May 23, 1964
340	35	"The Other Half"	Andrew V. McLaglen	John Dunkel	May 30, 1964
341	36	"Journey for Three"	Harry Harris	Frank Paris	June 6, 1964

=== Season 10 (1964–65) ===
No. overall	No. in season	Title	Directed by	Written by	Original release date
342	1	"Blue Heaven"	Michael O'Herlihy	Les Crutchfield	September 26, 1964
343	2	"Crooked Mile"	Andrew V. McLaglen	Les Crutchfield	October 3, 1964
344	3	"Old Man"	Harry Harris	John Meston	October 10, 1964
345	4	"The Violators"	Harry Harris	John Dunkel	October 17, 1964
346	5	"Doctor's Wife"	Harry Harris	George Eckstein	October 24, 1964
347	6	"Take Her, She's Cheap"	Harry Harris	Kathleen Hite	October 31, 1964
348	7	"Help Me, Kitty"	Harry Harris	Kathleen Hite	November 7, 1964
349	8	"Hung High"	Mark Rydell	John Meston	November 14, 1964
350	9	"Jonah Hutchinson"	Harry Harris	Calvin Clements, Sr.	November 21, 1964
351	10	"Big Man, Big Target"	Michael O'Herlihy	John Mantley	November 28, 1964
352	11	"Chicken"	Andrew V. McLaglen	John Meston	December 5, 1964
353	12	"Innocence"	Harry Harris	John Meston	December 12, 1964
354	13	"Aunt Thede"	Sutton Roley	Kathleen Hite	December 19, 1964
355	14	"Hammerhead"	Christian Nyby	Antony Ellis	December 26, 1964
356	15	"Double Entry"	Joseph Sargent	Les Crutchfield	January 2, 1965
357	16	"Run, Sheep, Run"	Harry Harris	John Meston	January 9, 1965
358	17	"Deputy Festus"	Harry Harris	Calvin Clements, Sr.	January 16, 1965
359	18	"One Killer on Ice"	Joseph H. Lewis	Richard Carr	January 23, 1965
360	19	"Chief Joseph"	Mark Rydell	Story by : Thomas Warner; Teleplay by : Clyde Ware	January 30, 1965
361	20	"Circus Trick"	William F. Claxton	Les Crutchfield	February 6, 1965
362	21	"Song for Dying"	Allen Reisner	Harry Kronman	February 13, 1965
363	22	"Winner Take All"	Vincent McEveety	Les Crutchfield	February 20, 1965
364	23	"Eliab's Aim"	Richard C. Sarafian	Will Corry	February 27, 1965
365	24	"Thursday's Child"	Joseph H. Lewis	Robert Lewin	March 6, 1965
366	25	"Breckinridge"	Vincent McEveety	Les Crutchfield	March 13, 1965
367	26	"Bank Baby"	Andrew V. McLaglen	John Meston	March 20, 1965
368	27	"The Lady"	Mark Rydell	John Mantley	March 27, 1965
369	28	"Dry Road to Nowhere"	Vincent McEveety	Harry Kronman	April 3, 1965
370	29	"Twenty Miles from Dodge"	Mark Rydell	Clyde Ware	April 10, 1965
371	30	"The Pariah"	Harry Harris	Calvin Clements, Sr.	April 17, 1965
372	31	"Gilt Guilt"	Harry Harris	Kathleen Hite	April 24, 1965
373	32	"Bad Lady from Brookline"	Michael O'Herlihy	Gustave Field	May 1, 1965
374	33	"Two Tall Men"	Vincent McEveety	Frank Q. Dobbs & Robert Stewart, Jr.	May 8, 1965
375	34	"Honey Pot"	Harry Harris	John Meston	May 15, 1965
376	35	"The New Society"	Joseph Sargent	Calvin Clements, Sr.	May 22, 1965
377	36	"He Who Steals"	Harry Harris	John Meston	May 29, 1965

=== Season 11 (1965–66) ===
No. overall	No. in season	Title	Directed by	Written by	Original release date
378	1	"Seven Hours to Dawn"	Vincent McEveety	Clyde Ware	September 18, 1965
379	2	"The Storm"	Joseph Sargent	Paul Savage	September 25, 1965
380	3	"Clayton Thaddeus Greenwood"	Joseph Sargent	Calvin Clements, Sr.	October 2, 1965
381	4	"Ten Little Indians"	Mark Rydell	George Eckstein	October 9, 1965
382	5	"Taps for Old Jeb"	James Sheldon	Les Crutchfield	October 16, 1965
383	6	"Kioga"	Harry Harris	Robert Lewin	October 23, 1965
384	7	"The Bounty Hunter"	Harry Harris	Paul Savage	October 30, 1965
385	8	"The Reward"	Marc Daniels	Gilbert Ralston, Scott Hunt & Beth Keele	November 6, 1965
386	9	"Malachi"	Gary Nelson	William Putman	November 13, 1965
387	10	"The Pretender"	Vincent McEveety	Calvin Clements, Sr.	November 20, 1965
388	11	"South Wind"	Allen Reisner	Jack Bartlett	November 27, 1965
389	12	"The Hostage"	Vincent McEveety	Story by : Joe Ann Johnson; Teleplay by : Clyde Ware	December 4, 1965
390	13	"Outlaw's Woman"	Mark Rydell	Clyde Ware	December 11, 1965
391	14	"The Avengers"	Vincent McEveety	Donn Mullally	December 18, 1965
392	15	"Gold Mine"	Abner Biberman	Scott Hunt & Beth Keele	December 25, 1965
393	16	"Death Watch"	Mark Rydell	Calvin Clements, Sr.	January 8, 1966
394	17	"Sweet Billy, Singer of Songs"	Alvin Ganzer	Gustave Field	January 15, 1966
395	18	"The Raid"	Vincent McEveety	Clyde Ware	January 22, 1966
396	19	"The Raid"	Vincent McEveety	Clyde Ware	January 29, 1966
397	20	"Killer at Large"	Marc Daniels	Calvin Clements, Sr.	February 5, 1966
398	21	"My Father's Guitar"	Robert Totten	Hal Sitowitz	February 12, 1966
399	22	"Wishbone"	Marc Daniels	Paul Savage	February 19, 1966
400	23	"Sanctuary"	Harry Harris	Calvin Clements, Sr.	February 26, 1966
401	24	"Honor Before Justice"	Harry Harris	Story by : Frank Q. Dobbs & Robert Stewart, Jr. Screenplay by : Frank Q. Dobbs	March 5, 1966
402	25	"The Brothers"	Tay Garnett	Tom Hanley	March 12, 1966
403	26	"Which Doctor"	Peter Graves	Les Crutchfield	March 19, 1966
404	27	"Harvest"	Harry Harris	Les Crutchfield	March 26, 1966
405	28	"By Line"	Allen Reisner	Les Crutchfield	April 9, 1966
406	29	"Treasure of John Walking Fox"	Marc Daniels	Story by : Leo Bagby; Teleplay by : Clyde Ware	April 16, 1966
407	30	"My Father, My Son"	Robert Totten	Hal Sitowitz	April 23, 1966
408	31	"Parson Comes to Town"	Marc Daniels	Verne Jay	April 30, 1966
409	32	"Prime of Life"	Robert Totten	Daniel B. Ullman	May 7, 1966

== One-hour color episodes (1966–1975) ==
=== Season 12 (1966–67) ===
No. overall	No. in season	Title	Directed by	Written by	Original release date
410	1	"Snap Decision"	Mark Rydell	Richard Carr	September 17, 1966
411	2	"The Goldtakers"	Vincent McEveety	Clyde Ware	September 24, 1966
412	3	"The Jailer"	Vincent McEveety	Hal Sitowitz	October 1, 1966
413	4	"The Mission"	Mark Rydell	Richard Carr	October 8, 1966
414	5	"The Good People"	Robert Totten	James Landis	October 15, 1966
415	6	"Gunfighter, R.I.P."	Mark Rydell	Story by : Michael Fisher; Screenplay by : Hal Sitowitz	October 22, 1966
416	7	"The Wrong Man"	Robert Totten	Story by : Robert Lewin; Screenplay by : Clyde Ware	October 29, 1966
417	8	"The Whispering Tree"	Vincent McEveety	Calvin Clements, Sr.	November 12, 1966
418	9	"The Well"	Marc Daniels	Francis Cockrell	November 19, 1966
419	10	"Stage Stop"	Irving J. Moore	Hal Sitowitz	November 26, 1966
420	11	"The Newcomers"	Robert Totten	Calvin Clements, Sr.	December 3, 1966
421	12	"Quaker Girl"	Bernard L. Kowalski	Preston Wood	December 10, 1966
422	13	"The Moonstone"	Richard A. Colla	Paul Savage	December 17, 1966
423	14	"Champion of the World"	Marc Daniels	Les Crutchfield	December 24, 1966
424	15	"The Hanging"	Bernard L. Kowalski	Story by : Calvin Clements, Jr. Teleplay by : Calvin Clements, Sr.	December 31, 1966
425	16	"Saturday Night"	Robert Totten	Clyde Ware	January 7, 1967
426	17	"Mad Dog"	Charles R. Rondeau	Jay Simms	January 14, 1967
427	18	"Muley"	Allen Reisner	Les Crutchfield	January 21, 1967
428	19	"Mail Drop"	Robert Totten	Calvin Clements, Sr.	January 28, 1967
429	20	"Old Friend"	Allen Reisner	Clyde Ware	February 4, 1967
430	21	"Fandango"	James Landis	Don Ingalls	February 11, 1967
431	22	"The Returning"	Marc Daniels	James Landis	February 18, 1967
432	23	"The Lure"	Marc Daniels	Clyde Ware	February 25, 1967
433	24	"Noose of Gold"	Irving J. Moore	Clyde Ware	March 4, 1967
434	25	"The Favor"	Marc Daniels	Don Ingalls	March 11, 1967
435	26	"Mistaken Identity"	Robert Totten	Paul Savage and Les Crutchfield	March 18, 1967
436	27	"Ladies from St. Louis"	Irving J. Moore	Clyde Ware	March 25, 1967
437	28	"Nitro! (Part 1)"	Robert Totten	Preston Wood	April 8, 1967
438	29	"Nitro! (Part 2)"	Robert Totten	Preston Wood	April 15, 1967

=== Season 13 (1967–68) ===
No. overall	No. in season	Title	Directed by	Written by	Original release date
439	1	"The Wreckers"	Robert Totten	Hal Sitowitz	September 11, 1967
440	2	"Cattle Barons"	Gunnar Hellström	Clyde Ware	September 18, 1967
441	3	"The Prodigal"	Bernard McEveety	Calvin Clements, Sr.	September 25, 1967
442	4	"Vengeance (Part 1)"	Richard C. Sarafian	Calvin Clements, Sr.	October 2, 1967
443	5	"Vengeance (Part 2)"	Richard C. Sarafian	Calvin Clements, Sr.	October 9, 1967
444	6	"A Hat"	Robert Totten	Ron Bishop	October 16, 1967
445	7	"Hard Luck Henry"	John Rich	Warren Douglas	October 23, 1967
446	8	"Major Glory"	Robert Totten	Story by : Clyde Ware and Richard Carr; Teleplay by : Richard Carr	October 30, 1967
447	9	"The Pillagers"	Vincent McEveety	Calvin Clements, Sr.	November 6, 1967
448	10	"Prairie Wolfer"	Robert Butler	Calvin Clements, Sr.	November 13, 1967
449	11	"Stranger in Town"	E. Darrell Hallenbeck	Story by : Emily Mosher and John Dunkel; Screenplay by : John Dunkel	November 20, 1967
450	12	"Death Train"	Gunnar Hellström	Ken Trevey	November 27, 1967
451	13	"Rope Fever"	David Alexander	Chris Rellas	December 4, 1967
452	14	"Wonder"	Irving J. Moore	Story by : Mary Worrell and William Blinn; Screenplay by : William Blinn	December 18, 1967
453	15	"Baker's Dozen"	Irving J. Moore	Charles Joseph Stone	December 25, 1967
454	16	"The Victim"	Vincent McEveety	Story by : Hal Sitowitz; Screenplay by : Arthur Rowe	January 1, 1968
455	17	"Dead Man's Law"	John Rich	Calvin Clements, Jr.	January 8, 1968
456	18	"Nowhere to Run"	Vincent McEveety	Story by : Robert Totten; Screenplay by : Ron Honthaner	January 15, 1968
457	19	"Blood Money"	Robert Totten	Hal Sitowitz	January 22, 1968
458	20	"Hill Girl"	Robert Totten	Calvin Clements, Sr.	January 29, 1968
459	21	"The Gunrunners"	Irving J. Moore	Hal Sitowitz	February 5, 1968
460	22	"The Jackals"	Alvin Ganzer	Calvin Clements, Jr.	February 12, 1968
461	23	"The First People"	Robert Totten	Calvin Clements, Sr.	February 19, 1968
462	24	"Mr. Sam'l"	Gunnar Hellström	Harry Kronman	February 26, 1968
463	25	"A Noose for Dobie Price"	Richard C. Sarafian	Antony Ellis	March 4, 1968

=== Season 14 (1968–69) ===
No. overall	No. in season	Title	Directed by	Written by	Original release date
464	1	"Lyle's Kid"	Bernard McEveety	Calvin Clements, Sr.	September 23, 1968
465	2	"The Hidecutters"	Bernard McEveety	Jack Turley	September 30, 1968
466	3	"Zavala"	Vincent McEveety	Paul Savage	October 7, 1968
467	4	"Uncle Finney"	Bernard McEveety	Calvin Clements, Sr.	October 14, 1968
468	5	"Slocum"	Leo Penn	Ron Bishop	October 21, 1968
469	6	"O'Quillian"	John Rich	Ron Bishop	October 28, 1968
470	7	"9:12 to Dodge"	Marvin J. Chomsky	Preston Wood	November 11, 1968
471	8	"Abelia"	Vincent McEveety	Calvin Clements, Sr.	November 18, 1968
472	9	"Railroad!"	Marvin J. Chomsky	Arthur Rowe	November 25, 1968
473	10	"The Miracle Man"	Bernard McEveety	Calvin Clements, Sr.	December 2, 1968
474	11	"Waco"	Robert Totten	Ron Bishop	December 9, 1968
475	12	"Lobo"	Bernard McEveety	Jim Byrnes	December 16, 1968
476	13	"Johnny Cross"	Herschel Daugherty	Calvin Clements, Sr.	December 23, 1968
477	14	"The Money Store"	Vincent McEveety	William Blinn	December 30, 1968
478	15	"The Twisted Heritage"	Bernard McEveety	Story by : Robert Heverly and Jack Turley; Screenplay by : Paul Savage and Arthur Rowe	January 6, 1969
479	16	"Time of the Jackals"	Vincent McEveety	Story by : Paul Savage; Screenplay by : Paul Savage and Richard Fielder	January 13, 1969
480	17	"Mannon"	Robert Butler	Ron Bishop	January 20, 1969
481	18	"Gold Town"	Gunnar Hellström	Calvin Clements, Sr.	January 27, 1969
482	19	"The Mark of Cain"	Vincent McEveety	Ron Bishop	February 3, 1969
483	20	"Reprisal"	Bernard McEveety	Story by : Jack Hawn; Screenplay by : Jack Hawn and Paul Savage	February 10, 1969
484	21	"The Long Night"	John Rich	Story by : Richard Carr; Screenplay by : Paul Savage	February 17, 1969
485	22	"The Night Riders"	Irving J. Moore	Calvin Clements, Sr.	February 24, 1969
486	23	"The Intruder"	Vincent McEveety	Jim Byrnes	March 3, 1969
487	24	"The Good Samaritans"	Bernard McEveety	Paul Savage	March 10, 1969
488	25	"The Prisoner"	Leo Penn	Calvin Clements, Sr.	March 17, 1969
489	26	"Exodus 21:22"	Herschel Daugherty	Arthur Rowe	March 24, 1969

=== Season 15 (1969–70) ===
No. overall	No. in season	Title	Directed by	Written by	Original release date
490	1	"The Devil's Outpost"	Philip Leacock	Story by : Bob Barbash; Screenplay by : Bob Barbash and Jim Byrnes	September 22, 1969
491	2	"Stryker"	Robert Totten	Herman Groves	September 29, 1969
492	3	"Coreyville"	Bernard McEveety	Herman Groves	October 6, 1969
493	4	"Danny (AKA 'The Wake')"	Bernard McEveety	Preston Wood	October 13, 1969
494	5	"Hawk"	Gunnar Hellström	Kay Lenard & Jess Carneol	October 20, 1969
495	6	"A Man Called Smith"	Vincent McEveety	Calvin Clements, Sr.	October 27, 1969
496	7	"Charlie Noon"	Vincent McEveety	Jim Byrnes	November 3, 1969
497	8	"The Still"	Gunnar Hellström	Calvin Clements, Sr.	November 10, 1969
498	9	"A Matter of Honor"	Robert Totten	Joy Dexter	November 17, 1969
499	10	"The Innocent"	Marvin J. Chomsky	Walter Black	November 24, 1969
500	11	"Ring of Darkness"	Bernard McEveety	Arthur Dales^{[C]}	December 1, 1969
501	12	"MacGraw"	Philip Leacock	Kay Lenard & Jess Carneol	December 8, 1969
502	13	"Roots of Fear"	Philip Leacock	Arthur Browne, Jr.	December 15, 1969
503	14	"The Sisters"	Philip Leacock	William Kelley	December 29, 1969
504	15	"The War Priest"	Bernard McEveety	William Kelley	January 5, 1970
505	16	"The Pack Rat"	Philip Leacock	Story by : Arthur Browne, Jr. Teleplay by : Arthur Browne, Jr. and Jim Byrnes	January 12, 1970
506	17	"The Judas Gun"	Vincent McEveety	Harry Kronman	January 19, 1970
507	18	"Doctor Herman Schultz, M.D."	Bernard McEveety	Story by : Benny Rubin; Teleplay by : Calvin Clements, Sr.	January 26, 1970
508	19	"The Badge"	Vincent McEveety	Jim Byrnes	February 2, 1970
509	20	"Albert"	Vincent McEveety	Jim Byrnes	February 9, 1970
510	21	"Kiowa"	Bernard McEveety	Ron Bishop	February 16, 1970
511	22	"Celia"	Philip Leacock	Harry Kronman	February 23, 1970
512	23	"Morgan"	Bernard McEveety	Kay Lenard & Jess Carneol	March 2, 1970
513	24	"The Thieves"	Philip Leacock	Thomas Thompson	March 9, 1970
514	25	"Hackett"	Vincent McEveety	William Kelley	March 16, 1970
515	26	"The Cage"	Bernard McEveety	Calvin Clements, Sr.	March 23, 1970

=== Season 16 (1970–71) ===
No. overall	No. in season	Title	Directed by	Written by	Original release date
516	1	"Chato"	Vincent McEveety	Paul F. Edwards	September 14, 1970
517	2	"The Noose"	Vincent McEveety	Arthur Browne, Jr.	September 21, 1970
518	3	"Stark"	Robert Totten	Donald Sanford	September 28, 1970
519	4	"Sam McTavish, M.D."	Bernard McEveety	Bethel Leslie & Gerry Day	October 5, 1970
520	5	"Gentry's Law"	Vincent McEveety	Jack Miller	October 12, 1970
521	6	"Snow Train (Part 1)"	Gunnar Hellström	Preston Wood	October 19, 1970
522	7	"Snow Train (Part 2)"	Gunnar Hellström	Preston Wood	October 26, 1970
523	8	"Luke"	Bernard McEveety	Jack Miller	November 2, 1970
524	9	"The Gun"	Bernard McEveety	Donald Sanford	November 9, 1970
525	10	"The Scavengers"	Robert Totten	Jim Byrnes	November 16, 1970
526	11	"The Witness"	Philip Leacock	Shimon Wincelberg	November 23, 1970
527	12	"McCabe"	Bernard McEveety	Jim Byrnes	November 30, 1970
528	13	"The Noon Day Devil"	Philip Leacock	William Kelley	December 7, 1970
529	14	"Sergeant Holly"	Bernard McEveety	William Kelley	December 14, 1970
530	15	"Jenny"	Robert Totten	Jack Miller	December 28, 1970
531	16	"Captain Sligo"	William Conrad	William Kelley	January 4, 1971
532	17	"Mirage"	Vincent McEveety	Jack Miller	January 11, 1971
533	18	"The Tycoon"	Bernard McEveety	Robert Vincent Wright	January 25, 1971
534	19	"Jaekel"	Bernard McEveety	Story by : True Boardman & Thelma Boardman; Screenplay by : Calvin Clements, Sr.	February 1, 1971
535	20	"Murdoch"	Robert Totten	Jack Miller	February 8, 1971
536	21	"Cleavus"	Vincent McEveety	Richard Scott	February 15, 1971
537	22	"Lavery"	Vincent McEveety	Donald Sanford	February 22, 1971
538	23	"Pike"	Bernard McEveety	Jack Miller	March 1, 1971
539	24	"Pike"	Bernard McEveety	Jack Miller	March 8, 1971

=== Season 17 (1971–72) ===
No. overall	No. in season	Title	Directed by	Written by	Original release date
540	1	"The Lost"	Robert Totten	Story by : Warren Vanders; Screenplay by : Jack Miller	September 13, 1971
541	2	"Phoenix"	Paul Stanley	Anthony Lawrence	September 20, 1971
542	3	"Waste (Part 1)"	Vincent McEveety	Jim Byrnes	September 27, 1971
543	4	"Waste (Part 2)"	Vincent McEveety	Jim Byrnes	October 4, 1971
544	5	"New Doctor in Town"	Philip Leacock	Jack Miller	October 11, 1971
545	6	"The Legend"	Philip Leacock	Calvin Clements, Jr.	October 18, 1971
546	7	"Trafton"	Bernard McEveety	Ron Bishop	October 25, 1971
547	8	"Lynott"	Gunnar Hellström	Ron Bishop	November 1, 1971
548	9	"Lijah"	Irving J. Moore	William Blinn	November 8, 1971
549	10	"My Brother's Keeper"	Paul Stanley	Arthur Dales^{[C]}	November 15, 1971
550	11	"Drago"	Paul Stanley	Jim Byrnes	November 22, 1971
551	12	"The Bullet (Part 1)"	Bernard McEveety	Jim Byrnes	November 29, 1971
552	13	"The Bullet (Part 2)"	Bernard McEveety	Jim Byrnes	December 6, 1971
553	14	"The Bullet (Part 3)"	Bernard McEveety	Jim Byrnes	December 13, 1971
554	15	"P.S. Murry Christmas"	Herb Wallerstein	William Kelley	December 27, 1971
555	16	"No Tomorrow"	Irving J. Moore	Richard Fielder	January 3, 1972
556	17	"Hidalgo"	Paul Stanley	Colley Cibber	January 10, 1972
557	18	"Tara"	Bernard McEveety	William Kelley	January 17, 1972
558	19	"One for the Road"	Bernard McEveety	Jack Miller	January 24, 1972
559	20	"The Predators"	Bernard McEveety	Calvin Clements, Sr.	January 31, 1972
560	21	"Yankton"	Vincent McEveety	Jim Byrnes	February 7, 1972
561	22	"Blind Man's Buff"	Herb Wallerstein	Ron Honthaner	February 21, 1972
562	23	"Alias Festus Haggin"	Vincent McEveety	Calvin Clements, Sr.	March 6, 1972
563	24	"The Wedding"	Bernard McEveety	Harry Kronman	March 13, 1972

=== Season 18 (1972–73) ===
No. overall	No. in season	Title	Directed by	Written by	Original release date
564	1	"The River (Part 1)"	Herb Wallerstein	Jack Miller	September 11, 1972
565	2	"The River (Part 2)"	Herb Wallerstein	Jack Miller	September 18, 1972
566	3	"Bohannan"	Alf Kjellin	William Kelley	September 25, 1972
567	4	"The Judgement"	Philip Leacock	Shimon Wincelberg	October 2, 1972
568	5	"The Drummer"	Bernard McEveety	Richard Fielder	October 9, 1972
569	6	"Sarah (formerly 'The Liar')"	Gunnar Hellström	Calvin Clements, Sr.	October 16, 1972
570	7	"The Fugitives"	Irving J. Moore	Charles Joseph Stone	October 23, 1972
571	8	"Eleven Dollars"	Irving J. Moore	Paul Savage	October 30, 1972
572	9	"Milligan"	Bernard McEveety	Ron Bishop	November 6, 1972
573	10	"Tatum"	Gunnar Hellström	Jim Byrnes	November 13, 1972
574	11	"The Sodbusters"	Robert Butler	Ron Bishop	November 20, 1972
575	12	"The Brothers (formerly 'Incident at Sayville Junction')"	Gunnar Hellström	Calvin Clements, Sr.	November 27, 1972
576	13	"Hostage! (formerly 'The Execution')"	Gunnar Hellström	Paul F. Edwards	December 11, 1972
577	14	"Jubilee"	Herb Wallerstein	Story by : Jack Freeman; Screenplay by : Paul Savage	December 18, 1972
578	15	"Arizona Midnight"	Irving J. Moore	Dudley Bromley	January 1, 1973
579	16	"Homecoming"	Gunnar Hellström	Calvin Clements, Sr.	January 8, 1973
580	17	"Shadler"	Arnold Laven	Jim Byrnes	January 15, 1973
581	18	"Patricia"	Alf Kjellin	Calvin Clements, Sr.	January 22, 1973
582	19	"A Quiet Day in Dodge (formerly 'The Marshal')"	Alf Kjellin	Jack Miller	January 29, 1973
583	20	"Whelan's Men"	Paul F. Edwards	Ron Bishop	February 5, 1973
584	21	"Kimbro"	Gunnar Hellström	Jim Byrnes	February 12, 1973
585	22	"Jesse"	Bernard McEveety	Jim Byrnes	February 19, 1973
586	23	"Talbot"	Vincent McEveety	Jim Byrnes	February 26, 1973
587	24	"This Golden Land"	Gunnar Hellström	Hal Sitowitz	March 5, 1973

=== Season 19 (1973–74) ===
No. overall	No. in season	Title	Directed by	Written by	Original release date
588	1	"Women for Sale (Part 1)"	Vincent McEveety	Jim Byrnes	September 10, 1973
589	2	"Women for Sale (Part 2)"	Vincent McEveety	Jim Byrnes	September 17, 1973
590	3	"Matt's Love Story"	Gunnar Hellström	Ron Bishop	September 24, 1973
591	4	"The Boy and the Sinner"	Bernard McEveety	Hal Sitowitz	October 1, 1973
592	5	"The Widow-Maker"	Bernard McEveety	Paul F. Edwards	October 8, 1973
593	6	"Kitty's Love Affair"	Vincent McEveety	Story by : Joan E. Gessler & Susan Kotar; Screenplay by : Paul Savage	October 22, 1973
594	7	"The Widow and the Rogue"	Bernard McEveety	Story by : Harvey Marlowe and Paul Savage; Screenplay by : Paul Savage	October 29, 1973
595	8	"A Game of Death...An Act of Love (Part 1)"	Gunnar Hellström	Paul F. Edwards	November 5, 1973
596	9	"A Game of Death...An Act of Love (Part 2)"	Gunnar Hellström	Paul F. Edwards	November 12, 1973
597	10	"Lynch Town"	Bernard McEveety	Story by : Anne Snyder & Joann Carlino; Screenplay by : Calvin Clements, Sr.	November 19, 1973
598	11	"The Hanging of Newly O'Brien"	Alf Kjellin	Calvin Clements, Sr.	November 26, 1973
599	12	"Susan Was Evil"	Bernard McEveety	William Keys	December 3, 1973
600	13	"The Deadly Innocent"	Bernard McEveety	Calvin Clements, Sr.	December 17, 1973
601	14	"The Child Between"	Irving J. Moore	Harry Kronman	December 24, 1973
602	15	"A Family of Killers"	Gunnar Hellström	William Keys	January 14, 1974
603	16	"Like Old Times"	Irving J. Moore	Richard Fielder	January 21, 1974
604	17	"The Town Tamers"	Gunnar Hellström	Paul Savage	January 28, 1974
605	18	"The Foundling"	Bernard McEveety	Jim Byrnes	February 11, 1974
606	19	"The Iron Blood of Courage"	Gunnar Hellström	Ron Bishop	February 18, 1974
607	20	"The Schoolmarm"	Bernard McEveety	Dick Nelson	February 25, 1974
608	21	"Trail of Bloodshed"	Bernard McEveety	Story by : Earl W. Wallace; Screenplay by : Paul Savage	March 4, 1974
609	22	"Cowtown Hustler"	Gunnar Hellström	Jim Byrnes	March 11, 1974
610	23	"To Ride a Yeller Horse"	Vincent McEveety	Calvin Clements, Sr.	March 18, 1974
611	24	"The Disciple"	Gunnar Hellström	Shimon Wincelberg	April 1, 1974

=== Season 20 (1974–75) ===
No. overall	No. in season	Title	Directed by	Written by	Original release date
612	1	"Matt Dillon Must Die"	Victor French	Ray Goldrup	September 9, 1974
613	2	"Town in Chains"	Bernard McEveety	Ron Bishop	September 16, 1974
614	3	"The Guns of Cibola Blanca (Part 1)"	Gunnar Hellström	Paul Savage	September 23, 1974
615	4	"The Guns of Cibola Blanca (Part 2)"	Gunnar Hellström	Paul Savage	September 30, 1974
616	5	"Thirty a Month and Found"	Bernard McEveety	Jim Byrnes	October 7, 1974
617	6	"The Wiving"	Victor French	Earl W. Wallace	October 14, 1974
618	7	"The Iron Men"	Gunnar Hellström	John Mantley	October 21, 1974
619	8	"The Fourth Victim"	Bernard McEveety	Jim Byrnes	November 4, 1974
620	9	"The Tarnished Badge"	Michael O'Herlihy	Robert Vincent Wright	November 11, 1974
621	10	"In Performance of Duty"	Gunnar Hellström	William Keys	November 18, 1974
622	11	"Island in the Desert (Part 1)"	Gunnar Hellström	Jim Byrnes	December 2, 1974
623	12	"Island in the Desert (Part 2)"	Gunnar Hellström	Jim Byrnes	December 9, 1974
624	13	"The Colonel"	Bernard McEveety	Arthur Dales^{[C]}	December 16, 1974
625	14	"The Squaw"	Gunnar Hellström	Jim Byrnes	January 6, 1975
626	15	"The Hiders"	Victor French	Paul Savage	January 13, 1975
627	16	"Larkin"	Gunnar Hellström	Jim Byrnes	January 20, 1975
628	17	"The Fires of Ignorance"	Victor French	Jim Byrnes	January 27, 1975
629	18	"The Angry Land"	Bernard McEveety	Story by : Herman Groves; Screenplay by : Jim Byrnes	February 3, 1975
630	19	"Brides and Grooms"	Victor French	Earl W. Wallace	February 10, 1975
631	20	"Hard Labor"	Bernard McEveety	Story by : Hal Sitowitz; Screenplay by : Earl W. Wallace	February 24, 1975
632	21	"I Have Promises to Keep"	Vincent McEveety	Story by : William Putman; Screenplay by : William Putman and Earl W. Wallace	March 3, 1975
633	22	"The Busters"	Vincent McEveety	Jim Byrnes	March 10, 1975
634	23	"Manolo"	Gunnar Hellström	Story by : Harriet Charles and Earl W. Wallace; Screenplay by : Earl W. Wallace	March 17, 1975
635	24	"The Sharecroppers"	Leonard Katzman	Earl W. Wallace	March 31, 1975

== Television films (1987–1994) ==
Title	Directed by	Written by	Original release date
Gunsmoke: Return to Dodge	Vincent McEveety	Jim Bynes	September 26, 1987
Gunsmoke: The Last Apache	Charles Correll	Earl W. Wallace	March 18, 1990
Gunsmoke: To the Last Man	Jerry Jameson	Earl W. Wallace	January 10, 1992
Gunsmoke: The Long Ride	Jerry Jameson	Bill Stratton	May 8, 1993
Gunsmoke: One Man's Justice	Jerry Jameson	Harry and Renee Longstreet	February 24, 1994

== See also ==
- List of Gunsmoke (radio series) episodes

== Notes ==
1. A. "David S. Peckinpah" is a pseudonym for Sam Peckinpah.
2. B. "Shimon Bar-David" is a pseudonym for Shimon Wincelberg.
3. C. "Arthur Dales" is a pseudonym for Howard Dimsdale.

== Footnotes ==
=== References ===
- Barabas, SuzAnne; Barabas, Gabor (1990). Gunsmoke: A Complete History and Analysis of the Legendary Broadcast Series, 2 volume set. Jefferson, North Carolina: McFarland & Company, Inc. ISBN 978-0-7864-7221-5.
- Brooks, Tim; Marsh, Earle F. (2003). The Complete Directory to Prime Time Network and Cable TV Shows, 1946-Present (8th ed.). New York: Ballantine Books. ISBN 0-345-45542-8.
- Costello, Ben (2006). Gunsmoke: An American Institution. Chandler, Arizona: Five Star Publications. ISBN 978-1-58985-014-9.
- Lentz, Harris M. (1997). Television Westerns Episode Guide: All United States Series, 1949-1996. Jefferson, North Carolina: McFarland & Company. ISBN 978-0-7864-7386-1.
- MacDonald, J. Fred (1987). Who Shot the Sheriff?: The Rise and Fall of the Television Western. New York: Praeger Paperback. ISBN 978-0-275-92326-6.
