= List of Gunsmoke (radio series) episodes =

Gunsmoke is an American western radio series, which was developed for radio by John Meston and Norman Macdonnell. The series ran for nine seasons and was broadcast by CBS. The first episode of the series originally aired in the United States on April 26, 1952, and the final first-run episode aired on June 18, 1961. During the series, a total of 480 original episodes were broadcast, including shows with re-used or adapted scripts. A television version of the series premiered in 1955.

Gunsmoke is set in and around Dodge City, Kansas, in the post-Civil War era and centers around United States Marshall Matt Dillon (William Conrad) as he enforces law and order in the city. The series also focuses on Dillon's friendship with three other citizens of Dodge City: Doctor Charles "Doc" Adams (Howard McNear), the town's physician; Kitty Russell (Georgia Ellis), owner of the Long Branch Saloon; and Chester Wesley Proudfoot (Parley Baer). Other roles were played by a group of supporting actors consisting of John Dehner, Sam Edwards, Harry Bartell, Vic Perrin, Lou Krugman, Lawrence Dobkin, Barney Phillips, Jack Kruschen, Ralph Moody, Ben Wright, James Nusser, Richard Crenna, Tom Tully, Joseph Kearns, Virginia Gregg, Jeanette Nolan, Virginia Christine, Helen Kleeb, Lillian Buyeff, Vivi Janiss, and Jeanne Bates. The entire nine-season run of Gunsmoke was produced by Norman Macdonnell.

== Series overview ==
Season	Episodes	Originally released	
Season	Episodes	First released	Last released
1	71	April 26, 1952	August 29, 1953
2	53	September 5, 1953	August 30, 1954
3	52	September 6, 1954	August 27, 1955
4	53	September 3, 1955	August 26, 1956
5	52	September 2, 1956	August 25, 1957
6	53	September 1, 1957	August 31, 1958
7	52	September 7, 1958	August 30, 1959
8	52	September 6, 1959	August 28, 1960
9	42	September 4, 1960	June 18, 1961

== Episodes ==
The original pilot episode of Gunsmoke was entitled "Mark Dillon Goes to Gouge Eye" and was recorded twice. The first was on June 11, 1949, with Rye Billsbury as Dillon and the second on July 15, 1949, with Howard Culver in the lead. Neither pilot was aired and the hero's name was eventually changed from Mark Dillon to Matt Dillon.

=== Season 1 (1952–1953) ===
NOTE: 4 episodes from this season are partially or completely missing. These episodes are 05/03/1952 - Ben Thompson (The first 7:43 survives), 05/17/1952 - Dodge City Killer, 06/14/1952 - Jailbait Janet, and 06/21/1952 - Heat Spell.

No. overall	No. in season	Title	Written by	Original release date
1	1	"Billy the Kid"	Walter B. Newman	April 26, 1952
2	2	"Ben Thompson"	Herb Purdum	May 3, 1952
3	3	"Jaliscoe"	Les Crutchfield	May 10, 1952
4	4	"Dodge City Killer"	Herb Purdum	May 17, 1952
5	5	"Ben Slade's Saloon"	Norman Macdonnell	May 24, 1952
6	6	"Carmen"	John Meston	May 31, 1952
7	7	"Buffalo Hunters"	Joel Murcott	June 7, 1952
8	8	"Jailbait Janet"	Les Crutchfield	June 14, 1952
9	9	"Heat Spell"	Lou Huston	June 21, 1952
10	10	"The Ride Back"	Antony Ellis	June 28, 1952
11	11	"Never Pester Chester"	John Meston	July 5, 1952
12	12	"The Boughten Bride"	John Meston	July 12, 1952
13	13	"Doc Holiday"	Herb Purdum	July 19, 1952
14	14	"Gentleman's Disagreement"	Les Crutchfield	July 26, 1952
15	15	"Renegade White"	John Meston	August 2, 1952
16	16	"The Kentucky Tolmans"	Herb Purdum	August 9, 1952
17	17	"The Lynching"	John Meston	August 16, 1952
18	18	"Shakespeare"	Antony Ellis	August 23, 1952
19	19	"The Juniper Tree"	Herb Purdum	August 30, 1952
20	20	"The Brothers"	Les Crutchfield	September 6, 1952
21	21	"Home Surgery"	John Meston	September 13, 1952
22	22	"Drop Dead"	Les Crutchfield	September 20, 1952
23	23	"The Railroad"	David Ellis	September 27, 1952
24	24	"Cain"	John Meston	October 3, 1952
25	25	"Hinka-Do"	Les Crutchfield	October 10, 1952
26	26	"Lochinvar"	Les Crutchfield	October 17, 1952
27	27	"The Mortgage"	Les Crutchfield	October 24, 1952
28	28	"Overland Express"	John Meston	October 31, 1952
29	29	"Tara"	Norman Macdonnell	November 7, 1952
30	30	"The Square Triangle"	Les Crutchfield	November 14, 1952
31	31	"Fingered"	John Meston	November 21, 1952
32	32	"Kitty"	Antony Ellis	November 29, 1952
33	33	"I Don't Know"	Antony Ellis	December 6, 1952
34	34	"Post Martin"	Les Crutchfield	December 13, 1952
35	35	"Christmas Story"	Antony Ellis	December 20, 1952
36	36	"The Cabin"	John Meston	December 27, 1952
37	37	"Westbound"	Les Crutchfield	January 3, 1953
38	38	"Word of Honor"	John Meston	January 10, 1953
39	39	"Paid Killer"	Les Crutchfield	January 17, 1953
40	40	"The Old Lady"	Kathleen Hite	January 24, 1953
41	41	"Cavalcade"	Les Crutchfield	January 31, 1953
42	42	"Cain"	John Meston	February 7, 1953
43	43	"The Round-Up"	John Meston	February 14, 1953
44	44	"Meshougah"	Antony Ellis	February 21, 1953
45	45	"Trojan War"	Les Crutchfield	February 28, 1953
46	46	"Absolom"	Les Crutchfield	March 7, 1953
47	47	"Cyclone"	Les Crutchfield	March 14, 1953
48	48	"Pussy Cats"	Antony Ellis	March 21, 1953
49	49	"Quarter-Horse"	Norman Macdonnell	March 28, 1953
50	50	"Jayhawkers"	John Meston	April 4, 1953
51	51	"Gonif"	Antony Ellis	April 11, 1953
52	52	"Bum's Rush"	John Meston	April 18, 1953
53	53	"The Soldier"	John Meston	April 25, 1953
54	54	"Tacetta"	John Meston	May 2, 1953
55	55	"The Buffalo Hunter"	John Meston	May 9, 1953
56	56	"The Big Con"	John Meston	May 16, 1953
57	57	"Print Asper"	John Meston	May 23, 1953
58	58	"Fall Semester"	John Meston	May 30, 1953
59	59	"Sundown"	William Conrad	June 6, 1953
60	60	"Spring Term"	John Meston	June 13, 1953
61	61	"Wind"	John Meston	June 20, 1953
62	62	"Flashback"	Les Crutchfield	June 27, 1953
63	63	"Dirt"	John Meston	July 4, 1953
64	64	"Grass"	John Meston	July 11, 1953
65	65	"Wild West"	John Meston	July 18, 1953
66	66	"Hickok"	John Meston	July 25, 1953
67	67	"Boy"	Norman Macdonnell	August 1, 1953
68	68	"Sky"	John Meston	August 8, 1953
69	69	"Moon"	John Meston	August 15, 1953
70	70	"Gone Straight"	John Meston	August 22, 1953
71	71	"Jesse"	John Meston	August 29, 1953

=== Season 2 (1953–1954) ===
NOTE: In "The Cast", the 15th episode of this season, the role of Doc Adams was played by Paul Frees.

No. overall	No. in season	Title	Written by	Original release date
72	1	"The Sutler"	John Meston	September 5, 1953
73	2	"Prairie Happy"	John Meston	September 12, 1953
74	3	"There Was Never a Horse"	John Meston	September 19, 1953
75	4	"Fawn"	John Meston	September 26, 1953
76	5	"How To Kill a Friend"	John Meston	October 3, 1953
77	6	"How To Die For Nothing"	John Meston	October 10, 1953
78	7	"Yorky"	John Meston	October 17, 1953
79	8	"The Buffalo Hunter"	John Meston	October 24, 1953
80	9	"How To Kill a Woman"	John Meston	October 31, 1953
81	10	"Stolen Horses"	Norman Macdonnell	November 7, 1953
82	11	"Professor Lute Bone"	John Meston	November 14, 1953
83	12	"Custer"	John Meston	November 21, 1953
84	13	"Kick Me"	John Meston	November 28, 1953
85	14	"The Lamb"	John Meston	December 5, 1953
86	15	"The Cast"	John Meston	December 12, 1953
87	16	"Big Girl Lost"	John Meston	December 19, 1953
88	17	"The Guitar"	John Meston	December 26, 1953
89	18	"Stage Hold-Up"	John Meston	January 2, 1954
90	19	"Joke's On Us"	John Meston	January 9, 1954
91	20	"The Bear"	John Meston	January 16, 1954
92	21	"Nina"	Norman Macdonnell	January 23, 1954
93	22	"Gun Smuggler"	John Meston	January 30, 1954
94	23	"Big Broad"	John Meston	February 6, 1954
95	24	"The Killer"	John Meston	February 13, 1954
96	25	"Last Fling"	John Meston	February 20, 1954
97	26	"Bad Boy"	John Meston	February 27, 1954
98	27	"The Gentleman"	John Meston	March 6, 1954
99	28	"Confederate Money"	John Meston	March 13, 1954
100	29	"Old Friend"	John Meston	March 20, 1954
101	30	"Blood Money"	John Meston	March 27, 1954
102	31	"Mr. & Mrs. Amber"	John Meston	April 3, 1954
103	32	"Greater Love"	John Meston	April 10, 1954
104	33	"What the Whisky Drummer Heard"	John Meston	April 17, 1954
105	34	"Murder Warrant"	John Meston	April 24, 1954
106	35	"Cara"	John Meston	May 1, 1954
107	36	"The Constable"	John Meston	May 8, 1954
108	37	"The Indian Horse"	Norman Macdonnell	May 15, 1954
109	38	"Monopoly"	John Meston	May 22, 1954
110	39	"Feud"	John Meston	May 29, 1954
111	40	"Blacksmith"	John Meston	June 5, 1954
112	41	"Cover-Up"	John Meston	June 12, 1954
113	42	"Going Bad"	John Meston	June 19, 1954
114	43	"Claustrophobia"	John Meston	July 3, 1954
115	44	"Word of Honor"	John Meston	July 5, 1954
116	45	"Hack Prine"	John Meston	July 5, 1954
117	46	"Texas Cowboys"	John Meston	July 12, 1954
118	47	"The Queue"	John Meston	July 19, 1954
119	48	"Matt For Murder"	John Meston	July 26, 1954
120	49	"No Indians"	John Meston	August 2, 1954
121	50	"Joe Phy"	John Meston	August 9, 1954
122	51	"Mavis McCloud"	John Meston	August 16, 1954
123	52	"Young Man With a Gun"	John Meston	August 23, 1954
124	53	"Obie Tater"	John Meston	August 30, 1954

=== Season 3 (1954–1955) ===
No. overall	No. in season	Title	Written by	Original release date
125	1	"Handcuffs"	John Meston	September 6, 1954
126	2	"Dooley Surrenders"	John Meston	September 13, 1954
127	3	"The F.U."	John Meston	September 20, 1954
128	4	"The Helping Hand"	John Meston	September 27, 1954
129	5	"Matt Gets It"	John Meston	October 2, 1954
130	6	"Love of a Good Woman"	John Meston	October 9, 1954
131	7	"Kitty Caught"	John Meston	October 16, 1954
132	8	"Ma Tennis"	John Meston	October 23, 1954
133	9	"The Patsy"	John Meston	October 30, 1954
134	10	"Smoking Out the Beedles"	John Meston	November 6, 1954
135	11	"Wrong Man"	John Meston	November 13, 1954
136	12	"How to Kill a Woman"	John Meston	November 20, 1954
137	13	"Cooter"	John Meston	November 27, 1954
138	14	"Cholera"	John Meston	December 4, 1954
139	15	"Bone Hunters"	John Meston	December 11, 1954
140	16	"Magnus"	John Meston	December 18, 1954
141	17	"Kitty Lost"	John Meston	December 25, 1954
142	18	"Bottle Man"	John Meston	January 1, 1955
143	19	"Robin Hood"	John Meston	January 8, 1955
144	20	"Chester's Murder"	John Meston	January 15, 1955
145	21	"Sins of Our Fathers"	John Meston	January 22, 1955
146	22	"Young Love"	John Meston	January 29, 1955
147	23	"Cheyennes"	John Meston	February 5, 1955
148	24	"Chester's Hanging"	John Meston	February 12, 1955
149	25	"Poor Pearl"	John Meston	February 19, 1955
150	26	"Crack-Up"	John Meston	February 26, 1955
151	27	"Kite's Reward"	John Meston	March 5, 1955
152	28	"The Trial"	John Meston	March 12, 1955
153	29	"The Mistake"	John Meston	March 19, 1955
154	30	"The Horse Deal"	John Meston	March 26, 1955
155	31	"Bloody Hands"	John Meston	April 2, 1955
156	32	"Skid Row"	John Meston	April 9, 1955
157	33	"The Gypsum Hills Feud"	John Meston	April 16, 1955
158	34	"Born To Hang"	John Meston	April 23, 1955
159	35	"Reward For Matt"	John Meston	April 30, 1955
160	36	"Potato Road"	John Meston	May 7, 1955
161	37	"Robber Bridegroom"	John Meston	May 14, 1955
162	38	"Liar From Blackhawk"	John Meston	May 21, 1955
163	39	"Cow Doctor"	John Meston	May 28, 1955
164	40	"Jealousy"	John Meston	June 4, 1955
165	41	"Trust"	John Meston	June 11, 1955
166	42	"Reed Survives"	Les Crutchfield	June 18, 1955
167	43	"The Army Trial"	Norman Macdonnell	June 25, 1955
168	44	"General Parley Smith"	John Meston	July 2, 1955
169	45	"Uncle Oliver"	John Meston	July 9, 1955
170	46	"20/20"	John Meston	July 16, 1955
171	47	"Ben Tolliver's Stud"	Norman Macdonnell	July 23, 1955
172	48	"Tap Day For Kitty"	John Meston	July 30, 1955
173	49	"Innocent Broad"	John Meston	August 6, 1955
174	50	"Johnny Reb"	Les Crutchfield	August 13, 1955
175	51	"Indian Scout"	John Dunkel	August 20, 1955
176	52	"Doc Quits"	John Meston	August 27, 1955

=== Season 4 (1955–1956) ===
No. overall	No. in season	Title	Written by	Original release date
177	1	"Change of Heart"	John Meston	September 3, 1955
178	2	"Alarm At Pleasant Valley"	John Dunkel	September 10, 1955
179	3	"Thoroughbreds"	John Meston	September 17, 1955
180	4	"Indian White"	Tom Hanley, John Meston	September 24, 1955
181	5	"Barton Boy"	Les Crutchfield	October 1, 1955
182	6	"Good Girl-Bad Company"	John Meston	October 8, 1955
183	7	"The Coward"	John Meston	October 9, 1955
184	8	"Trouble In Kansas"	John Meston	October 16, 1955
185	9	"Brush At Elkader"	John Meston	October 23, 1955
186	10	"The Choice"	John Meston	October 30, 1955
187	11	"The Second Choice"	John Meston	November 6, 1955
188	12	"The Preacher"	John Meston	November 13, 1955
189	13	"Dutch George"	John Dunkel	November 20, 1955
190	14	"Amy's Good Deed"	John Meston	November 27, 1955
191	15	"Sunny Afternoon"	Les Crutchfield	December 4, 1955
192	16	"Land Deal"	John Meston	December 11, 1955
193	17	"Scared Kid"	John Meston	December 18, 1955
194	18	"Twelfth Night"	John Meston	December 25, 1955
195	19	"Pucket's New Year"	John Meston	January 1, 1956
196	20	"Doc's Revenge"	John Dunkel	January 8, 1956
197	21	"How To Cure a Friend"	John Meston	January 15, 1956
198	22	"Romeo"	John Meston	January 22, 1956
199	23	"The Bureaucrat"	John Meston	January 29, 1956
200	24	"Legal Revenge"	John Meston	February 5, 1956
201	25	"Kitty's Outlaw"	John Meston	February 12, 1956
202	26	"The New Hotel"	John Meston	February 19, 1956
203	27	"Who Lives By the Sword"	John Meston	February 26, 1956
204	28	"The Hunter"	John Dunkel	March 4, 1956
205	29	"Bringing Down Father"	John Meston	March 11, 1956
206	30	"The Man Who Would Be Marshal"	John Meston	March 18, 1956
207	31	"Hanging Man"	John Meston	March 25, 1956
208	32	"How To Sell a Ranch"	John Meston	April 1, 1956
209	33	"Widow's Mite"	John Meston	April 8, 1956
210	34	"The Executioner"	John Meston	April 15, 1956
211	35	"Indian Crazy"	John Meston	April 22, 1956
212	36	"Doc's Reward"	John Meston	April 29, 1956
213	37	"The Photographer"	John Dunkel	May 6, 1956
214	38	"Cows and Cribs"	John Meston	May 13, 1956
215	39	"Buffalo Man"	John Meston	May 20, 1956
216	40	"Man Hunter"	John Meston	May 27, 1956
217	41	"The Pacifist"	John Meston	June 3, 1956
218	42	"Daddy-O"	John Meston	June 10, 1956
219	43	"Cheap Labor"	John Meston	June 17, 1956
220	44	"Sunday Supplement"	John Meston	June 24, 1956
221	45	"Gun For Chester"	John Meston	July 1, 1956
222	46	"Passive Resistance"	John Meston	July 8, 1956
223	47	"Letter of the Law"	John Meston	July 15, 1956
224	48	"Lynching Man"	John Meston	July 22, 1956
225	49	"Lost Rifle"	John Meston	July 29, 1956
226	50	"Sweet and Sour"	John Meston	August 5, 1956
227	51	"Snakebite"	John Meston	August 12, 1956
228	52	"Annie Oakley"	John Meston	August 19, 1956
229	53	"No Sale"	John Meston	August 26, 1956

=== Season 5 (1956–1957) ===
No. overall	No. in season	Title	Written by	Original release date
230	1	"Old Pal"	Les Crutchfield	September 2, 1956
231	2	"Belle's Back"	Les Crutchfield	September 9, 1956
232	3	"Thick 'N' Thin"	Les Crutchfield	September 16, 1956
233	4	"Box O' Rocks"	Les Crutchfield	September 23, 1956
234	5	"The Brothers"	William Leicester	September 30, 1956
235	6	"The Gambler"	John Dunkel	October 7, 1956
236	7	"Gunshot Wound"	Gil Doud	October 14, 1956
237	8	"Till Death Do Us"	Les Crutchfield	October 21, 1956
238	9	"Dirty Bill's Girl"	Les Crutchfield	October 28, 1956
239	10	"Crowbait Bob"	Les Crutchfield	November 10, 1956
240	11	"Pretty Mama"	Les Crutchfield	November 11, 1956
241	12	"Brother Whelp"	Les Crutchfield	November 18, 1956
242	13	"Tail To the Wind"	Les Crutchfield	November 25, 1956
243	14	"Speak To Me Fair"	Les Crutchfield	December 2, 1956
244	15	"Braggart's Boy"	Les Crutchfield	December 9, 1956
245	16	"Cherry Red"	Les Crutchfield	December 16, 1956
246	17	"Beeker's Barn"	Les Crutchfield	December 23, 1956
247	18	"Hound Dog"	Les Crutchfield	December 30, 1956
248	19	"Devil's Hindmost"	Les Crutchfield	January 6, 1957
249	20	"Ozymandias"	Les Crutchfield	January 13, 1957
250	21	"Categorical Imperative"	Les Crutchfield	January 20, 1957
251	22	"Woman Called Mary"	Les Crutchfield	January 27, 1957
252	23	"Cold Fire"	Les Crutchfield	February 3, 1957
253	24	"Hellbent Harriet"	Les Crutchfield	February 10, 1957
254	25	"Doubtful Zone"	Les Crutchfield	February 17, 1957
255	26	"Impact"	Les Crutchfield	February 24, 1957
256	27	"Colleen So Green"	Les Crutchfield	March 3, 1957
257	28	"Grebb Hassle"	Les Crutchfield	March 10, 1957
258	29	"Spring Freshit"	Les Crutchfield	March 17, 1957
259	30	"Saddle Sore Sal"	Les Crutchfield	March 24, 1957
260	31	"Chicken Smith"	Les Crutchfield	March 31, 1957
261	32	"Rock Bottom"	Les Crutchfield	April 7, 1957
262	33	"Saludos"	Les Crutchfield	April 14, 1957
263	34	"Bear Trap"	Les Crutchfield	April 21, 1957
264	35	"Medicine Man"	Les Crutchfield	April 28, 1957
265	36	"How to Kill a Friend"	Les Crutchfield	May 5, 1957
266	37	"Sheep Dog"	Les Crutchfield	May 12, 1957
267	38	"One Night Stand"	Les Crutchfield	May 19, 1957
268	39	"Pal"	Tom Hanley	May 26, 1957
269	40	"Ben Tolliver's Stud"	Norman Macdonnell	June 2, 1957
270	41	"Dodge Podge"	Les Crutchfield	June 9, 1957
271	42	"Summer Night"	Tom Hanley	June 16, 1957
272	43	"Home Surgery"	John Meston	June 23, 1957
273	44	"The Buffalo Hunter"	Les Crutchfield	June 30, 1957
274	45	"Word of Honor"	John Meston	July 7, 1957
275	46	"Bloody Hands"	John Meston	July 14, 1957
276	47	"Kitty Caught"	John Meston	July 21, 1957
277	48	"Cow Doctor"	John Meston	July 28, 1957
278	49	"Big Hands"	Les Crutchfield	August 4, 1957
279	50	"Jayhawkers"	John Meston	August 11, 1957
280	51	"Peace Officer"	Norman Macdonnell	August 18, 1957
281	52	"Grass"	John Meston	August 25, 1957

=== Season 6 (1957–1958) ===
No. overall	No. in season	Title	Written by	Original release date
282	1	"Jobe's Son"	Marian Clark	September 1, 1957
283	2	"Looney Mccluny"	Les Crutchfield	September 8, 1957
284	3	"Child Labor"	Robert Mitchell	September 15, 1957
285	4	"Custer"	John Meston	September 22, 1957
286	5	"Another Man's Poison"	Les Crutchfield	September 29, 1957
287	6	"The Rooks"	Marian Clark	October 6, 1957
288	7	"The Margin"	Les Crutchfield	October 13, 1957
289	8	"Professor Lute Bone"	Les Crutchfield	October 20, 1957
290	9	"Man and Boy"	Les Crutchfield	October 27, 1957
291	10	"Bull"	Robert Mitchell	November 3, 1957
292	11	"Gunshy"	Marian Clark	November 10, 1957
293	12	"The Queue"	John Meston	November 17, 1957
294	13	"Odd Man Out"	Les Crutchfield	November 24, 1957
295	14	"Jud's Woman"	Marian Clark	December 1, 1957
296	15	"Long As I Live"	Les Crutchfield	December 8, 1957
297	16	"Ugly"	Robert Mitchell	December 15, 1957
298	17	"Twelfth Night"	John Meston	December 28, 1957
299	18	"Where'd They Go"	Les Crutchfield	December 29, 1957
300	19	"Pucket's New Year"	John Meston	January 5, 1958
301	20	"Second Son"	Marian Clark	January 12, 1958
302	21	"Moo Moo Raid"	Les Crutchfield	January 19, 1958
303	22	"One For Lee"	Les Crutchfield	January 26, 1958
304	23	"Kitty's Killing"	Marian Clark	February 2, 1958
305	24	"Joke's On Us"	John Meston	February 9, 1958
306	25	"Bruger's Folly"	Les Crutchfield	February 16, 1958
307	26	"The Surgery"	Marian Clark	February 23, 1958
308	27	"The Guitar"	John Meston	March 2, 1958
309	28	"Laughing Gas"	Norman Macdonnell, James Fonda	March 9, 1958
310	29	"Real Sent Sonny"	Les Crutchfield	March 16, 1958
311	30	"Indian"	Robert Mitchell	March 23, 1958
312	31	"Why Not"	Les Crutchfield	March 30, 1958
313	32	"Yorky"	John Meston	April 6, 1958
314	33	"Livvie's Loss"	Marian Clark	April 13, 1958
315	34	"The Partners"	John Dunkel	April 20, 1958
316	35	"The Squaw"	John Dunkel	April 27, 1958
317	36	"How to Die for Nothing"	John Meston	May 10, 1958
318	37	"Little Bird"	Les Crutchfield	May 11, 1958
319	38	"The Stallion"	Marian Clark	May 18, 1958
320	39	"Blue Horse"	Marian Clark	May 25, 1958
321	40	"Quarter Horse"	Norman Macdonnell	June 1, 1958
322	41	"Hot Horse Hyatt"	Les Crutchfield	June 8, 1958
323	42	"Old Flame"	Marian Clark	June 15, 1958
324	43	"Target"	Les Crutchfield	June 22, 1958
325	44	"What the Whisky Drummer Heard"	John Meston	June 29, 1958
326	45	"Chester's Choice"	Marian Clark	July 6, 1958
327	46	"The Proving Kid"	Les Crutchfield	July 13, 1958
328	47	"Marshal Proudfoot"	Tom Hanley	July 20, 1958
329	48	"The Cast"	John Meston	July 27, 1958
330	49	"Miguel's Daughter"	Marian Clark	August 3, 1958
331	50	"A House Ain't a Home"	Les Crutchfield	August 10, 1958
332	51	"The Piano"	Marian Clark	August 17, 1958
333	52	"The Blacksmith"	Norman Macdonnell	August 24, 1958
334	53	"I Thee Wed"	Les Crutchfield	August 31, 1958

=== Season 7 (1958–1959) ===
No. overall	No. in season	Title	Written by	Original release date
335	1	"Tried It-Didn't Like It"	Les Crutchfield	September 7, 1958
336	2	"False Witness"	Marian Clark	September 14, 1958
337	3	"Big Girl Lost"	John Meston	September 21, 1958
338	4	"Kitty's Rebellion"	Marian Clark	September 28, 1958
339	5	"Tag, You're It"	Les Crutchfield	October 5, 1958
340	6	"Doc's Showdown"	Marian Clark	October 12, 1958
341	7	"Kick Me"	John Meston	October 19, 1958
342	8	"The Tragedian"	Les Crutchfield	October 26, 1958
343	9	"Old Man's Gold"	Marian Clark	November 2, 1958
344	10	"Target: Chester"	Marian Clark	November 9, 1958
345	11	"Brush at Elkader"	John Meston	November 16, 1958
346	12	"The Correspondent"	Marian Clark	November 23, 1958
347	13	"Burning Wagon"	Marian Clark	November 30, 1958
348	14	"The Grass Asp"	Les Crutchfield	December 7, 1958
349	15	"Kitty's Injury"	Marian Clark	December 14, 1958
350	16	"Where'd They Go"	Les Crutchfield	December 21, 1958
351	17	"The Choice"	John Meston	December 28, 1958
352	18	"The Coward"	John Meston	January 4, 1959
353	19	"The Wolfer"	John Dunkel	January 11, 1959
354	20	"Kangaroo"	John Meston	January 18, 1959
355	21	"The Boots"	John Meston	January 25, 1959
356	22	"The Bobsy Twins"	John Meston	February 1, 1959
357	23	"Groat's Grudge"	Marian Clark	February 8, 1959
358	24	"Body Snatch"	Marian Clark	February 15, 1959
359	25	"Sarah's Search"	Marian Clark	February 22, 1959
360	26	"Big Tom"	Marian Clark	March 1, 1959
361	27	"Maw Hawkins"	Tom Hanley	March 8, 1959
362	28	"Incident At Indian Ford"	John Dunkel	March 15, 1959
363	29	"The Trial"	John Meston	March 22, 1959
364	30	"Laurie's Suitor"	Marian Clark	March 29, 1959
365	31	"Trapper's Revenge"	John Dunkel	April 5, 1959
366	32	"Chester's Mistake"	Marian Clark	April 12, 1959
367	33	"Third Son"	Marian Clark	April 19, 1959
368	34	"The Badge"	Marian Clark	April 26, 1959
369	35	"Unwanted Deputy"	Marian Clark	May 3, 1959
370	36	"Dowager's Visit"	Marian Clark	May 10, 1959
371	37	"Scared Boy"	Marian Clark	May 17, 1959
372	38	"Wagon Show"	Tom Hanley	May 24, 1959
373	39	"The Deserter"	Marian Clark	May 31, 1959
374	40	"Doc's Indians"	Marian Clark	June 7, 1959
375	41	"Kitty's Kidnap"	Marian Clark	June 14, 1959
376	42	"Carmen"	John Meston	June 21, 1959
377	43	"Jailbait Janet"	Les Crutchfield	June 28, 1959
378	44	"Emma's Departure"	Marian Clark	July 5, 1959
379	45	"Friend's Payoff"	Marian Clark	July 12, 1959
380	46	"Second Arrest"	Marian Clark	July 19, 1959
381	47	"Old Beller"	Marian Clark	July 26, 1959
382	48	"Ball Nine, Take Your Base"	Vic Perrin	August 2, 1959
383	49	"Mavis McCloud"	John Meston	August 9, 1959
384	50	"Pokey Pete"	Marian Clark	August 16, 1959
385	51	"The Reed Survives"	Les Crutchfield	August 23, 1959
386	52	"Shooting Stopover"	Marian Clark	August 30, 1959

=== Season 8 (1959–1960) ===
No. overall	No. in season	Title	Written by	Original release date
387	1	"Matt's Decision"	Marian Clark	September 6, 1959
388	2	"Johnny Red"	Les Crutchfield	September 13, 1959
389	3	"Gentlemen's Disagreement"	Les Crutchfield	September 20, 1959
390	4	"Personal Justice"	Marian Clark	September 27, 1959
391	5	"Hinka-Do"	Les Crutchfield	October 4, 1959
392	6	"Kitty's Quandary"	Marian Clark	October 11, 1959
393	7	"The Mortgage"	Les Crutchfield	October 18, 1959
394	8	"Old Gunfighter"	Marian Clark	October 25, 1959
395	9	"Westbound"	Les Crutchfield	November 1, 1959
396	10	"Cavalcade"	Les Crutchfield	November 8, 1959
397	11	"Square Triangle"	Les Crutchfield	November 15, 1959
398	12	"Paid Killer"	Les Crutchfield	November 22, 1959
399	13	"Hard Lesson"	Marian Clark	November 29, 1959
400	14	"Big Chugg Wilson"	Ray Kemper	December 6, 1959
401	15	"Don Mateo"	Marian Clark	December 13, 1959
402	16	"Beeker's Barn"	Les Crutchfield	December 20, 1959
403	17	"Pucket's New Year"	John Meston	December 27, 1959
404	18	"Trojan War"	Les Crutchfield	January 3, 1960
405	19	"Luke's Law"	Marian Clark	January 10, 1960
406	20	"Fiery Arrest"	Marian Clark	January 17, 1960
407	21	"Bless Me Till I Die"	Ray Kemper	January 24, 1960
408	22	"Chester's Dilemma"	Vic Perrin	January 31, 1960
409	23	"Delia's Father"	Marian Clark	February 7, 1960
410	24	"Distant Drummer"	Marian Clark	February 14, 1960
411	25	"Mr and Mrs Amber"	John Meston	February 21, 1960
412	26	"Prescribed Killing"	Marian Clark	February 28, 1960
413	27	"Blood Money"	John Meston	March 6, 1960
414	28	"Unloaded Gun"	Marian Clark	March 13, 1960
415	29	"The Constable"	John Meston	March 20, 1960
416	30	"Indian Baby"	Marian Clark	March 27, 1960
417	31	"Greater Love"	John Meston	April 3, 1960
418	32	"Dave's Lesson"	Marian Clark	April 10, 1960
419	33	"Solomon River"	Kathleen Hite	April 17, 1960
420	34	"Stage Snatch"	Marian Clark	April 24, 1960
421	35	"Nettie Sitton"	Kathleen Hite	May 1, 1960
422	36	"Wrong Man"	Marian Clark	May 8, 1960
423	37	"Tall Trapper"	Marian Clark	May 15, 1960
424	38	"Marryin' Bertha"	Tom Hanley	May 22, 1960
425	39	"Bad Seed"	Norman Macdonnell	May 29, 1960
426	40	"Fabulous Silver Extender"	Vic Perrin	June 5, 1960
427	41	"Kitty Accused"	Marian Clark	June 12, 1960
428	42	"Homely Girl"	Kathleen Hite	June 19, 1960
429	43	"Line Trouble"	Marian Clark	June 26, 1960
430	44	"Little Girl"	Kathleen Hite	July 3, 1960
431	45	"Reluctant Violence"	Marian Clark	July 10, 1960
432	46	"Busted-Up Guns"	Kathleen Hite	July 17, 1960
433	47	"The Imposter"	Kathleen Hite	July 24, 1960
434	48	"Stage Smash"	Marian Clark	July 31, 1960
435	49	"Old Fool"	John Meston, Norman Macdonnell	August 7, 1960
436	50	"The Noose"	Marian Clark	August 14, 1960
437	51	"Dangerous Bath"	Marian Clark	August 21, 1960
438	52	"Tumbleweed"	Tom Hanley	August 28, 1960

=== Season 9 (1960–1961) ===
No. overall	No. in season	Title	Written by	Original release date
439	1	"Peace Officer"	Norman Macdonnell	September 4, 1960
440	2	"About Chester"	Frank Paris	September 11, 1960
441	3	"Two Mothers"	Marian Clark	September 18, 1960
442	4	"Doc Judge"	John Meston, Norman Macdonnell	September 25, 1960
443	5	"The Big Itch"	Marian Clark	October 2, 1960
444	6	"Born to Hang"	John Meston	October 9, 1960
445	7	"Crack-Up"	John Meston	October 16, 1960
446	8	"Newsma'am"	Marian Clark	October 23, 1960
447	9	"Never Pester Chester"	John Meston	October 30, 1960
448	10	"Jedro's Woman"	Marian Clark	November 6, 1960
449	11	"The Big Con"	John Meston	November 13, 1960
450	12	"The Professor"	Marian Clark	November 20, 1960
451	13	"Dirt"	John Meston	November 27, 1960
452	14	"Kitty's Good Neighboring"	Marian Clark	December 4, 1960
453	15	"The Cook"	John Meston, Frank Paris	December 11, 1960
454	16	"Hero's Departure"	Marian Clark	December 18, 1960
455	17	"Minnie"	John Meston, Norman Macdonnell	December 25, 1960
456	18	"Spring Term"	John Meston	January 1, 1961
457	19	"Old Faces"	John Meston, Frank Paris	January 8, 1961
458	20	"The Wake"	John Meston, Norman Macdonnell	January 15, 1961
459	21	"Hard Virtue"	John Meston, Norman Macdonnell	January 22, 1961
460	22	"Harriet"	John Meston, Frank Paris	January 29, 1961
461	23	"Love of Money"	John Meston, Norman Macdonnell	February 5, 1961
462	24	"Daddy-O"	John Meston	February 12, 1961
463	25	"Kitty Love"	Frank Paris	February 19, 1961
464	26	"Joe Sleet"	Marian Clark	February 26, 1961
465	27	"Melinda Miles"	John Meston, Frank Paris	March 5, 1961
466	28	"Sweet and Sour"	John Meston	March 12, 1961
467	29	"Joe Phy"	John Meston	March 19, 1961
468	30	"No Indians"	John Meston	March 26, 1961
469	31	"Chester's Inheritance"	Vic Perrin, Harry Bartell	April 2, 1961
470	32	"Hangman's Mistake"	Marian Clark	April 9, 1961
471	33	"Cooter"	John Meston	April 16, 1961
472	34	"Father and Son"	Vic Perrin, Harry Bartell	April 23, 1961
473	35	"Ex-Urbanites"	John Meston, Frank Paris	April 30, 1961
474	36	"Ma's Justice"	Marian Clark	May 7, 1961
475	37	"The Lady Killer"	John Meston, Frank Paris	May 14, 1961
476	38	"Chester's Rendezvous"	Marian Clark	May 21, 1961
477	39	"The Sod-Buster"	Ray Kemper	May 28, 1961
478	40	"Cows and Cribs"	John Meston	June 4, 1961
479	41	"Doc's Visitor"	Marian Clark	June 11, 1961
480	42	"Letter of the Law"	John Meston	June 18, 1961

== See also ==
- List of Gunsmoke (TV series) episodes
