= Marian Clark =

American scriptwriter for radio and television

- Born: Marian Alice Clark; June 25, 1912; Alameda County, California, United States
- Died: February 26, 1963 (aged 50); Santa Monica, California, United States
- Occupations: Scriptwriter, news writer
- Years active: 1940s–1962

Marian Clark (born Marian Alice Clark; June 25, 1912 – February 26, 1963) was an American scriptwriter for radio and television series during the 1950s and early 1960s, most notably for the long-running, iconic Western series Gunsmoke, which aired on CBS Radio from 1952 to 1961 and on CBS Television for two decades. Clark ranks among the most prolific writers in the history of Gunsmoke; and prior to her work on that series, she was also one of the first women in American radio to be employed full time as a news writer for a major regional station and affiliate of a national broadcasting network.

== Early life ==
Marian Clark was born in Alameda County, California, in 1912 and was the eldest of three children of Laura Lee (née Bransford) and Albert Lee Clark. (Note: There are discrepancies regarding the year of Clark's birth, which account for differences in her given age at death. Her parents' original marriage certificate dated in June 1911, the federal census of 1920, California birth records, and records at Oak Hill Cemetery in Red Bluff, California, indicate her birth year was 1912.) Her father, a native of Missouri, had moved to California by 1910 and was working that year as a journalist in San Francisco. Later, Albert moved the short distance to Berkeley, where in 1920 he was serving as city editor of the local newspaper, a position that may have influenced Marian early in life and prompted her later as a young woman to venture into radio journalism as a profession. (Note: Identified as a "city editor" in Berkeley in 1920, Albert Clark was likely employed by The Berkeley Daily Gazette, which by then had been in circulation in the city for over two decades.) By 1930, however, her father had relocated the entire family to Oakland; and he had changed careers, working there as an "advertising man" in real estate.

== Radio news writer ==
Little is known about Clark's personal or professional life between the 1930 federal census and late 1942, when she enrolled in a 10-week training workshop offered by radio station KNX in Los Angeles. Due to the shortage of "manpower" on the home front in the United States during World War II, new job opportunities were opening to women in a wide variety of fields, including radio broadcasting. Station KNX in Los Angeles provided such opportunities through its "Hollywood Workshop", which offered training and advancement for "girl staff members" at KNX. The station's department heads taught classes to prepare workshop participants for assorted positions available in radio, such as news writers, transcription operators, mailroom clerks, and publicity managers.

In its February 22, 1943 issue, the trade magazine Broadcasting recognized Clark as one of the recent graduates of KNX's Hollywood Workshop. Since the workshop was 10 weeks in length and available only to staff members, Clark must have been working at KNX by at least the final months of 1942. Upon graduation, she and two other female employees were assigned to the station's news bureau as "junior writers". Those assignments were apparently probationary, for Clark was the only writer of the three who became a full-time writer at KNX and distinguished herself as "the first woman member in [the] station's news department", working there for the duration of World War II.

== Gunsmoke on radio ==
In 1938, KNX Los Angeles had begun serving as an affiliate of CBS Radio and also the broadcast center of that national network's West Coast or "Hollywood" programming. (Note: Radio station KNX and "Columbia Pacific Network" (the official title of CBS National Radio's Hollywood division) were housed in the same facilities at CBS Columbia Square in Los Angeles.) KNX employees therefore had frequent, if not daily, access to CBS regular staff and to the network's operations. Marian Clark's work as a writer in KNX's news department during World War II provided her interaction as well with CBS Radio colleagues. One of them, a secretary for the network, was Kathleen Hite, whom Clark met in 1943.

After the war Hite advanced professionally at CBS Los Angeles and joined the network's production staff, and after several years she became a scriptwriter. She subsequently encouraged Clark to put her own writing talents and radio experience to better use by drafting potential stories and proposing scripts to CBS Radio's nationally broadcast programs. By then, by the early 1950s, Clark had become a paraplegic and required the use of a wheelchair for reasons not disclosed in currently available documentation. Hite, in addition to recognizing Clark's potential, believed some new professional challenges would serve as a form of therapy for her friend and might benefit her health. Once she had given Clark some basic instruction on scriptwriting, Hite introduced her to Norman Macdonnell, a producer and director for popular CBS Radio productions, such as Suspense, Doorway to Life, Escape, and a weekly series he and writer John Meston had recently developed. Their new "adult Western", Gunsmoke, consisted of Old West stories set in the 1870s in southwestern Kansas, principally centered in the rowdy, "hard-drinking" cattle town of Dodge City. First aired on CBS Radio in 1952, Gunsmoke quickly became a highly rated, critically acclaimed series that was broadcast not only on radio but also on television by 1955.

Following her introduction to Macdonnell, Clark began working for CBS, although her early years working as a writer for the network are not fully documented like the stories and scripts she would later create for Gunsmoke. By 1957, however, the quality of her previous work had earned her assignments as a contributing writer for the very popular Western. According to the authoritative 1990 reference Gunsmoke: A Complete History and Analysis of the Legendary Broadcast Series by SuzAnne and Gabor Barabas, Clark's first script, "Jobe's Son", aired as the premiere episode for the radio series' sixth season on Sunday, September 1, 1957. In addition to Gunsmoke's regular cast of voice actors—William Conrad, Parley Baer, Howard McNear, and Georgia Ellis—that episode features Vic Perrin and John Dehner as guest stars in a story about a wayward son's clash with his father.

In the 1957 broadcast of "Jobe's Son", Clark receives no mention in the episode's closing voice credits; instead, her CBS colleague Les Crutchfield is credited for having "specially written" the installment, with John Meston also being mentioned for providing "editorial supervision". Despite the absence of any on-air credit for Clark, CBS and producer Macdonnell were apparently impressed with her work, for the network broadcast 13 more of her scripts in the 1957–1958 season. She finally received her first on-air credit for "Miguel's Daughter", which was broadcast near the end of that season, on August 3, 1958. Her final installment for 1957–1958, "The Piano", proved to be one of her more memorable scripts, a story about a delusional former Southern belle who dies defending her most "beloved" possession, an old cherry-wood piano. Once again, Clark received no on-air credit for that episode.

The next year, in the radio series' seventh season, Clark became Gunsmoke's primary script contributor, furnishing over half the stories—28 of 53 episodes—broadcast between September 1958 and the end of August 1959. During that season, she also began to receive consistently on-air credits for her writing. She received closing credits too for the 35 scripts she provided over the two remaining seasons of the radio version of Gunsmoke. Her script "Doc's Visitor", which aired on June 11, 1961, was the series' last "freshly written" episode. A rebroadcast of John Meston's 1956 episode "Letter of the Law" aired the following week to end the radio series' nine-year run. In the four seasons she wrote for Gunsmoke on CBS Radio, Clark furnished 77 scripts or almost 20 percent of the series' total catalog of 413 episodes. That individual total is only surpassed by the prodigious output of Gunsmoke co-creator John Meston, who is credited with writing 183 radio episodes, and by the 81 scripts done by Les Crutchfield.

With Hollywood productions of the "Old West" historically dominated by male characters, and in a 1950s television industry dominated by male writers, Clark proved to be a quick study in the Western genre, demonstrating a remarkable ability in her writing to identify with and credibly portray on paper the lives of cattle drovers, buffalo hunters, farmers, the displaced native people of Kansas, as well as the assorted inhabitants of Dodge City in the 1870s. Her storylines for Gunsmoke are quite diverse thematically, although approximately one-quarter of her scripts focus to varying degree on women, dealing with their isolation and physical struggles on prairie homesteads and with the emotional conflicts they faced within the given social structure of the latter nineteenth century. Beyond the usual barroom brawls, shootouts, and stagecoach robberies presented in Hollywood's traditional "Cowboy-and-Indian" features and serials, her scripts reflected Macdonnell and Meston's original intention to present Gunsmoke as an "adult Western". Her writings, as do other early scripts in the series, address directly or within the bounds of the network's contemporary standards and practices such sensitive issues as domestic violence, mental illness, filicide, rape, prostitution, racial and cultural discrimination, and alcoholism.

== Gunsmoke on television ==
As was common practice with Gunsmoke episodes written by CBS writers, many of Clark's radio scripts were later adapted for replay on the televised version of the series. Twenty-one of her stories were aired by CBS Television between 1959 and 1963. Nineteen of those were adapted to the "small screen" by the series' co-creator John Meston. For his 30-minute black-and-white teleplays based on Clark's writing and for one of his 60-minute episodes developed from her work, he adjusted some original dialogue and specified needs for set content, surrounding landscapes, livestock, clothing and firearms for cast, and other details required for stories now being presented in a visual format. The two stories by Clark not adapted by Meston—"The Summons" (1962) and "The Cousin" (1963)—were done by her colleague and friend Katherine Hite after the expansion of Gunsmoke's episodes to an hour at the start of televised series' seventh season. Clark's final script for Gunsmoke is "Quint's Indian", which features Burt Reynolds as Quint. That episode, the one adapted by Meston, premiered the month after Clark's death in 1963.

== Other radio and television work ==
In the late 1950s and into the 1960s, Clark wrote and adapted a few radio scripts and teleplays for CBS series other than Gunsmoke. For the network's radio version of Have Gun—Will Travel, she is credited with adapting Harry Julian Fink's script "Death of a Young Gunfighter" for its original broadcast on March 15, 1959. On television she is also credited as the writer of "Halliday's Club", an episode of the short-lived series Klondike. That installment aired on NBC in December 1960.

== Death ==
In February 1963, Marian Clark died of cancer at age 50 in Santa Monica, California.

== Clark's writing credits for Gunsmoke ==
The following list of radio and television episodes written by Clark is compiled from Gunsmoke: A Complete History and Analysis of the Legendary Broadcast Series (1990). (Note: Copies of the original radio broadcasts of Gunsmoke and most of the early 30-minute televised episodes are available for review at various online locations, including YouTube.) As done with many of the scripts authored by John Meston, Norman Macdonnell, Les Crutchfield, John Dunkel, Katherine Hite, and other writers for Gunsmoke, 18 of Clark's radio scripts were later adapted and replayed as 30-minute episodes on the televised version of the series.

=== Gunsmoke (radio), Season 6: 1957–1958 ===
As previously noted, Clark received only one on-air credit for her first 14 Gunsmoke scripts broadcast on CBS Radio. Her credits (or lack thereof) throughout the radio series were determined by reviewing closing acknowledgments of the original broadcast recordings, which are generally available at online sharing services, including YouTube.

Ep #	Episode Title	Credited Writer	Airdate
282(1)	"Jobe's Son"	Marian Clark—not on air; Les Crutchfield instead	September 1, 1957
287(6)	"The Rooks"	Marian Clark—not on air	October 6, 1957
292(11)	"Gunshy"	Marian Clark—not on air	November 10, 1957
295(14)	"Jud's Woman"	Marian Clark—not on air	December 1, 1957
301(20)	"Second Son"	Marian Clark—not on air	January 12, 1958
304(23)	"Kitty's Killing"	Marian Clark—not on air	February 2, 1958
307(26)	"The Surgery"	Marian Clark—not on air	February 23, 1958
314(33)	"Livvie's Loss"	Marian Clark—not on air	April 13, 1958
319(38)	"The Stallion"	Marian Clark—not on air	May 18, 1958
320(39)	"Blue Horse"	Marian Clark—not on air	May 25, 1958
323(42)	"Old Flame"	Marian Clark—not on air	June 15, 1958
326(45)	"Chester's Choice"	Marian Clark—not on air	July 6, 1958
330(49)	"Miguel's Daughter"	Marian Clark—on air	August 3, 1958
332(51)	"The Piano"	Marian Clark—not on air	August 17, 1958

=== Gunsmoke (radio), Season 7: 1958–1959 ===
Ep #	Episode Title	Credited Writer	Airdate
336(2)	"False Witness"	Marian Clark—on air	September 14, 1958
338(4)	"Kitty's Rebellion"	Marian Clark—not on air	September 28, 1958
340(6)	"Doc's Showdown"	Marian Clark—on air	October 12, 1958
343(9)	"Old Man's Gold"	Marian Clark—on air	November 2, 1958
344(10)	"Target: Chester"	Marian Clark—on air	November 9, 1958
346(12)	"The Correspondent"	Marian Clark—on air	November 23, 1958
347(13)	"Burning Wagon"	Marian Clark—on air	November 30, 1958
349(15)	"Kitty's Injury"	Marian Clark—on air	December 14, 1958
357(24)	"Groat's Grudge"	Marian Clark—on air	February 8, 1959
358(25)	"Body Snatch"	Marian Clark—on air	February 15, 1959
359(26)	"Sarah's Search"	Marian Clark—on air	February 22, 1959
360(27)	"Big Tom"	Marian Clark—on air	March 1, 1959
364(31)	"Laurie's Suitor"	Marian Clark—on air	March 29, 1959
366(33)	"Chester's Mistake"	Marian Clark—on air	April 12, 1959
367(34)	"Third Son"	Marian Clark—on air	April 19, 1959
368(35)	"The Badge"	Marian Clark—on air	April 26, 1959
369(36)	"Unwanted Deputy"	Marian Clark—on air	May 3, 1959
370(37)	"Dowager's Visit"	Marian Clark—on air	May 10, 1959
371(38)	"Scared Boy"	Marian Clark—on air	May 17, 1959
373(40)	"The Deserter"	Marian Clark—on air	May 31, 1959
374(41)	"Doc's Indians"	Marian Clark—on air	June 7, 1959
375(42)	"Kitty's Kidnap"	Marian Clark—on air	June 14, 1959
378(45)	"Emma's Departure"	Marian Clark—on air	July 5, 1959
379(46)	"Friend's Payoff"	Marian Clark—on air	July 12, 1959
380(47)	"Second Arrest"	Marian Clark—on air	July 19, 1959
381(48)	"Old Beller"	Marian Clark—on air	July 26, 1959
384(51)	"Pokey Pete"	Marian Clark—on air	August 16, 1959
386(53)	"Shooting Stopover"	Marian Clark—on air	August 30, 1959

=== Gunsmoke (radio), Season 8: 1959–1960 ===
Ep #	Title	Credited Writer	Airdate
387(1)	"Matt's Decision"	Marian Clark—on air	September 6, 1959
390(4)	"Personal Justice"	Marian Clark—on air	September 27, 1959
392(6)	"Kitty's Quandary"	Marian Clark—on air	October 11, 1959
394(8)	"Old Gunfighter"	Marian Clark—on air	October 25, 1959
399(13)	"Hard Lesson"	Marian Clark—on air	November 29, 1959
401(15)	"Don Mateo"	Marian Clark—on air	December 13, 1959
405(19)	"Luke's Law"	Marian Clark—on air	January 10, 1960
406(20)	"Fiery Arrest"	Marian Clark—on air	January 17, 1960
409(23)	"Delia's Father"	Marian Clark—on air	February 7, 1960
410(24)	"Distant Drummer"	Marian Clark—on air	February 14, 1960
412(26)	"Prescribed Killing"	Marian Clark—on air	February 28, 1960
414(28)	"Unloaded Gun"	Marian Clark—on air	March 13, 1960
416(30)	"Indian Baby"	Marian Clark—on air	March 27, 1960
418(32)	"Dave's Lesson"	Marian Clark—on air	April 10, 1960
420(34)	"Stage Snatch"	Marian Clark—on air	April 24, 1960
422(36)	"Wrong Man"	Marian Clark—on air	May 8, 1960
423(37)	"Tall Trapper"	Marian Clark—on air	May 15, 1960
427(41)	"Kitty Accused"	Marian Clark—on air	June 12, 1960
429(43)	"Line Trouble"	Marian Clark—on air	June 26, 1960
431(45)	"Reluctant Violence"	Marian Clark—on air	July 10, 1960
434(48)	"Stage Smash"	Marian Clark—on air	July 31, 1960
436(50)	"The Noose"	Marian Clark—on air	August 14, 1960
437(51)	"Dangerous Bath"	Marian Clark—on air	August 21, 1960

=== Gunsmoke (radio), Season 9: 1960–1961 ===
Ep #	Episode Title	Credited Writer	Airdate
441(3)	"Two Mothers"	Marian Clark—on air	September 18, 1960
443(5)	"The Big Itch"	Marian Clark—on air	October 2, 1960
446(8)	"Newsma'am"	Marian Clark—on air	October 23, 1960
448(10)	"Jedro's Woman"	Marian Clark—on air	November 6, 1960
450(12)	"The Professor"	Marian Clark—on air	November 20, 1960
452(14)	"Kitty's Good Neighboring"	Marian Clark—on air	December 4, 1960
454(16)	"Hero's Departure"	Marian Clark—on air	December 18, 1960
464(26)	"Joe Sleet"	Marian Clark—on air	February 26, 1961
470(32)	"Hangman's Mistake"	Marian Clark—on air	April 9, 1961
474(36)	"Ma's Justice"	Marian Clark—on air	May 7, 1961
476(38)	"Chester's Rendezvous"	Marian Clark—on air	May 21, 1961
479(41)	"Doc's Visitor"	Marian Clark—on air	June 11, 1961

=== Gunsmoke (television), Season 4: 1958–1959 ===
A total of 21 stories written by Clark were adapted as teleplays during seasons 4 through 8. John Meston developed 19 of the teleplays from her works, and Katherine Hite transformed her other two stories into teleplays. Neither of Hite's teleplays, which aired as one-hour episodes in 1962 and 1963, nor Meston's one-hour adaptation of Clark's story "Quint's Indian" in 1963 had been broadcast previously as shorter episodes in the radio series’ half-hour format.

Ep #	Episode Title	Credited Writer	Airdate
139(22)	"Kitty's Rebellion"	Marian Clark (story); John Meston (teleplay)	February 7, 1959
155(38)	"Blue Horse"	Marian Clark (story); John Meston (teleplay)	June 6, 1959

=== Gunsmoke (television), Season 5: 1959–1960 ===
Ep #	Episode Title	Credited Writer	Airdate
158(2)	"Kitty's Injury"	Marian Clark (story); John Meston (teleplay)	September 19, 1959
168(12)	"Miguel's Daughter"	Marian Clark (story); John Meston (teleplay)	November 28, 1959
170(14)	"False Witness"	Marian Clark (story); John Meston (teleplay)	December 12, 1959
173(17)	"Groat's Grudge"	Marian Clark (story); John Meston (teleplay)	January 2, 1960
174(18)	"Big Tom"	Marian Clark (story); John Meston (teleplay)	January 9, 1960
180(24)	"Kitty's Killing"	Marian Clark (story); John Meston (teleplay)	February 20, 1960
182(26)	"Unwanted Deputy"	Marian Clark (story); John Meston (teleplay)	March 5, 1960
193(37)	"Old Flame"	Marian Clark (story); John Meston (teleplay)	May 28, 1960
182(26)	"The Deserter"	Marian Clark (story); John Meston (teleplay)	June 4, 1960

=== Gunsmoke (television), Season 6: 1960–1961 ===
Ep #	Episode Title	Credited Writer	Airdate
196(1)	"Friend's Pay-Off"	Marian Clark (story); John Meston (teleplay)	September 3, 1960
200(5)	"Shooting Stopover"	Marian Clark (story); John Meston (teleplay)	October 8, 1960
202(7)	"Don Matteo"	Marian Clark (story); John Meston (teleplay)	October 22, 1960
204(9)	"The Badge"	Marian Clark (story); John Meston (teleplay)	November 12, 1960
205(10)	"Distant Drummer"	Marian Clark (story); John Meston (teleplay)	November 19, 1960
213(18)	"Unloaded Gun"	Marian Clark (story); John Meston (teleplay)	January 14, 1961
214(19)	"Tall Trapper"	Marian Clark (story); John Meston (teleplay)	January 21, 1961

=== Gunsmoke (television, one-hour episodes), Season 7: 1961–1962 ===
Ep #	Episode Title	Credited Writer	Airdate
262(29)	"The Summons"	Marian Clark (story); Kathleen Hite (teleplay)	April 21, 1962

=== Gunsmoke (television, one-hour episodes), Season 8: 1962–1963 ===
Ep #	Episode Title	Credited Writer	Airdate
288(21)	"The Cousin"	Marian Clark (story); Kathleen Hite (teleplay)	February 2, 1963
288(21)	"Quint's Indian"	Marian Clark (story); John Meston (teleplay)	March 2, 1963
