= John Meston =

American screenwriter

- Born: John Lyman Meston; July 30, 1914; Pueblo, Colorado; United States
- Died: March 24, 1979 (aged 64); Tarzana, Los Angeles; United States
- Occupation: Scriptwriter
- Years active: 1940s–1970s
- Spouse(s): Rosemary Carver (m. 1942–div.1954); Bette Ford (m. 1958–div. 1973); Mary Ann Hooper (1977–1979; his death)
- Children: 2

John Lyman Meston (July 30, 1914 – March 24, 1979) was an American scriptwriter best known for co-creating with producer Norman Macdonnell the long-running Western series Gunsmoke. He developed storylines and wrote radio scripts and teleplays for 379 episodes for the series, which was first broadcast on CBS Radio in 1952, and then adapted to the "small screen", as well, airing on television from 1955 to 1975. In addition to his work on Gunsmoke, Meston also served as a writer and editorial supervisor for other radio programs such as Escape, Suspense, Lux Radio Theater, and Fort Laramie; and in the 1970s, he wrote several episodes for two other television series, Little House on the Prairie and Hec Ramsey.

== Early life ==
John Meston was born in Colorado in 1914, the youngest of three children of Irene (née Whitehurst) and George D. Meston, who was an investment and loan specialist in Pueblo. Federal census records suggest that young John grew up in a financially comfortable household, one that was at least prosperous enough by 1920 to afford a live-in "servant". (Note: The worker employed full-time in the Meston household in 1920 is officially cited as a "Servant" in the census, but elsewhere on the same census page the worker is identified as a "Maid".) Ten years later, he was still residing in Pueblo with his parents and two older sisters, although in a larger home in a more affluent neighborhood on West 18th Street. During this time, as a teenager, Meston developed his skills as a horseman working in the summer with Colorado cowboys and competing periodically in regional rodeos as a bronc rider.

After graduation from high school, Meston received an extensive higher education at Dartmouth, Harvard, and in France at the Sorbonne. In the May 1958 issue of the entertainment magazine TV Radio Mirror, reporter Gordon Budge touches on Meston's substantial academic background and on some of his other experiences prior to joining CBS Radio after World War II:

Writer John Meston's checkered career began in Colorado some forty-three years ago and grasshopped through Dartmouth ('35) to the Left Bank in Paris, school teaching in Cuba, range-riding in Colorado, and ultimately, the job as Network Editor for CBS Radio in Hollywood. (Note: The "Left Bank", as cited in Budge's quote, is an allusion to the southern side of the Seine River, the area in the French capital where the University of Paris (Sorbonne) is located.)

== Career ==
Following his university studies and his work as a teacher, editor, reporter, and "range rider", 27-year-old Meston returned to Pueblo and enlisted in the United States Army on July 7, 1942. His military deployment during World War II included Alaska, where he served in the army's special ski-troop units in the Aleutians and also as a censor, a position that required him to review military and civilian correspondence and delete information that might prove helpful to enemy forces if those documents were intercepted. After the war, Meston was hired by KNX Radio in Los Angeles to be an assistant in the station's editing department, and by October 1945, he was promoted to head of that department.

Station KNX by the 1940s already served as the center of West Coast operations for the entire CBS Radio network, so Meston's next career move was a transitional one to CBS, where in 1947, he began working once again as a censor, more specifically in the network's program practices department. In that position, Meston monitored shows for any on-air comments by radio hosts or guest performers that the listening public, station owners, or program sponsors might deem profane, too sexually suggestive, slanderous, or overtly meanspirited. Meston in early September 1947 made front-page news in the entertainment trade paper Variety when he confronted and reprimanded national celebrity Arthur Godfrey for his "breach of good taste" on his popular weekday program. Reacting to complaints by station owners about Godfrey's unscripted comments or "ad libs" and the radio host's derisive use of the "Bronx cheer", Meston warned the radio host. "Censor John Meston", reported Variety, "served notice on CBS in New York that [Godfrey's] transcribed repeats on his daytime show would be monitored and the needle raised whenever there was a question of propriety in his off-the-cuff remarks." Godfrey was infuriated by his reprimand; but the "CBS homeoffice" supported Meston, and the radio celebrity was forced, at least for a while, to behave more carefully in his broadcasts.

Beyond the challenges he faced as a network censor and in carrying out his related duties in "'continuity acceptance'", Meston in his position enjoyed immediate and full access to scripts for every program being aired or in development at CBS. That access and Meston's experience as a writer and editor provided him opportunities to review in detail and later to start composing episodes for several highly rated radio programs. One of those CBS productions was the anthology series Escape, which had premiered in July 1947. While working on that program, he met producer-and-director Norman Macdonnell with whom he would collaborate on future projects, including the radio and television versions of Gunsmoke and the 1956 radio series Fort Laramie. (Note: A photograph of Meston with Macdonnell is provided on page 232 in the definitive reference on both the radio and television series, Gunsmoke: A Complete History and Analysis of the Legendary Broadcast Series (1990) by SuzAnne and Gabor Barabas.) Among the popular "radio plays" written by Meston for Escape is "Crossing Paris", an episode he adapted from a 1950 short story about Nazi-occupied Paris by French novelist Marcel Ayme. The installment, originally broadcast on CBS on August 5, 1950, features Jay Novello; William Conrad, who later starred as Marshal Matt Dillon on Gunsmoke; and Howard McNear, who was cast as "Doc" in that radio drama.

At this time, at the turn of the 1950s, Meston also began adapting stories, writing original scripts, and serving as an editorial supervisor for episodes of Romance, another popular CBS radio drama that had been on the air since 1943. He contributed scripts as well to installments of Suspense and Lux Radio Theater, yet two more of CBS Radio's lineup of notable programs during the 1940s, 1950s, and early 1960s.

=== Gunsmoke ===
In 1949, executives and programmers at CBS Radio wanted to establish a new Western for the network's regular offerings, one inspired by Straight Arrow, an existing series in the genre very popular among juvenile listeners and broadcast nationally twice a week by Mutual Broadcasting System. Due to contractual complications, the proposed series was shelved. Macdonnell and Meston two years later discovered the proposal while developing their own concept for a Western, but one they envisioned—unlike Straight Arrow, The Lone Ranger, and The Cisco Kid—being targeted predominantly at an adult audience. Adapting elements from the 1949 proposal, the two men expanded on the background narratives relating to their series’ general chronology and specific location. Set in the 1870s, stories were situated in southwestern Kansas, centered principally in the rowdy, "hard-drinking" cattle town of Dodge City. Originally, Meston and Macdonnell planned to name their new Western Jeff Spain, a character created and used earlier by them "on several of the anthology shows they had done together." However, their boss Harry Ackerman at CBS and other network executives dismissed that title, preferring Gunsmoke, a program heading that Ackerman himself was credited for conceiving.

Once given the go-ahead to continue preproduction and begin casting, Meston added details to several projected storylines and refined the main characters who would populate Macdonnell and his radio portrayal of Dodge. Jeff Spain soon became United States Marshal Matt Dillon, and veteran voice actor William Conrad was chosen by Meston, Macdonnell, and two other network audition judges to be the lawman and the series' central figure. Other seasoned actors filled the needed regular supporting roles, including Parley Baer as Marshal Dillon's trusty assistant Chester Proudfoot, Howard McNear as Dr. Charles "Doc" Adams, and Georgia Ellis, whose role in the series' early episodes quickly evolved into the saloon "hostess" Kitty Russell. Gunsmoke was broadcast for the first time from radio station KNX in Hollywood on Saturday, April 26, 1952. The premiere episode, "Billy the Kid", was not written by Meston; it was written by Walter Brown Newman, another experienced author of radio plays for CBS. Nevertheless, Meston's extensive personal research into the "Old West", his intimate knowledge of the fictional characters in Dodge, and his past exploits on horseback with "real" Colorado cowboys effectively cast him in the position of editorial supervisor of that first show.

The initial broadcast was well received by both critics and the general public, and in the weeks that followed, the ratings for Gunsmoke steadily grew. The critic for Variety praised the first episode's story, acting, and Macdonnell's direction, describing the new series as "a blazing radioater...with top thesping and scripting values that pull it way ahead of the pack of AM Westerns." The growing number of fan letters received by CBS appeared to confirm Variety's assessment and to reflect the type of audience that Meston and Macdonnell intended to attract, for much of the complimentary mail arriving at the network "came from a highly educated section of the population".

Following the successful beginning of Gunsmoke, Meston's scripts dominated the radio series' presentations for years and were frequently complimented in reviews for their high quality in both content and style. Meston as lead writer composed 143 of the 158 episodes broadcast during Gunsmoke's second, third, and fourth seasons between 1953 and 1956. One example of many positive reviews from that period is again given by Variety. Commenting on the episode "Hack Prine", which aired on July 5, 1954, the influential trade paper noted, "John Meston, while maintaining terseness in his script, endowed it with flashes of humor that gave it the character of maturity." The radio version of the series continued production until June 1961, and it remained popular even after the 1955 debut of the television version of Gunsmoke with James Arness, Dennis Weaver, Milburn Stone, and Amanda Blake in their respective roles as Marshal Dillon, Chester (his surname changed from Proudfoot to Goode), Doc, and Kitty. By 1958, the two formats of the series were together drawing a weekly audience of 55 million listeners and viewers. That total is especially impressive when considering that federal census officials in 1958 estimated the entire population of the United States that year, including all armed forces overseas, to be just over 173 million people.

As producer and director for Gunsmoke, Norman Macdonnell's contributions to the now-classic Western were numerous and profound, but Meston's "enormous" talents as head writer set exceptionally high standards for the series' story content throughout the 1950s and into the 1960s. His engaging plots and realistic dialogue continued to distinguish Gunsmoke from the array of other Westerns being broadcast on both radio and television. Macdonnell in interviews about his own career often expressed his admiration for the scripts that emerged from "Meston's 'grubby little typewriter'", as well as his ongoing frustrations about the "lack of recognition" given to his colleague by professional organizations. In a WAMU Radio interview about Gunsmoke in 1976—the year after the weekly series finally ended—Macdonnell voiced his dismay:

I think it should be known, that perhaps the most deserving award...was never passed out...[It] was the one that should have gone to John Meston, who wrote hundreds of these scripts, and to the best of my knowledge, received no specific award, which I think is rather a tragedy and an oversight.

Meston wrote scripts for Gunsmoke for 13 years, although the bulk of his stories were for episodes originally broadcast on radio and television during the 1950s. The final radio episode, "Letter of the Law", was written too by Meston but aired as a rerun on June 18, 1961. (Note: All of the radio episodes, their respective writers, and their initial broadcast dates are provided at the internal link "List of Gunsmoke radio episodes".) His final original story for the television series, "He Who Steals", aired on May 29, 1965. Overall, Meston is credited with writing a combined total of 379 episodes during the nine-year run of the radio version of Gunsmoke and the 20-year run of its television adaptation. According to the comprehensive 1990 reference Gunsmoke: A Complete History and Analysis of the Legendary Broadcast Series by SuzAnne and Gabor Barabas, Meston wrote 183 (44%) of the radio version's entire catalog of 413 episodes and 196 (31%) of the television show’s 635 installments. That prodigious output of scripts continued to influence later writers for Gunsmoke, with various episodes during the series' final decade on television being inspired by or partially based on earlier radio scripts and teleplays by Meston. (Note: The number of radio scripts and teleplays written by Meston for Gunsmoke is too large to cite on this page for practical reasons. A list can be compiled from the noted 1990 reference Gunsmoke: A Complete History and Analysis of the Legendary Broadcast Series or from separate Wikipedia listings of the radio and television episodes that are linked here.)

=== Outside Gunsmoke ===
Meston's writing and film projects outside the realms of CBS radio and television productions are to date not as well documented as his work on Gunsmoke. He did, though, write for some other film studios and television networks. In 1958, for example, he reportedly met his second wife at Metro-Goldwyn-Mayer while under contract to help develop and write a feature film for MGM. In fact in 1979, the year Meston died, he was working on a screenplay for a film being developed by director John Frankenheimer. Earlier, in 1971 and 1972 on television, he wrote scripts for two episodes of another Western, the Universal series Hec Ramsey starring Richard Boone as a former gunfighter turned lawman. Then, in 1975, Meston wrote the episodes "Child of Pain" and "Money Crop" for the NBC series Little House on the Prairie.

=== Emmy Award nomination ===
Meston composed at least 200 television scripts over the years, but he received only a single consideration for an Emmy Award. In 1958, his Gunsmoke story "Born to Hang" was nominated for "Best Teleplay Writing" in the category of broadcasts with running times of a half hour or less. His fellow screenwriters and he were also nominated in 1958 for their work on Frontiers of Faith and on the sitcoms Leave it to Beaver and Father Knows Best lost to Paul Monash, who received the Emmy that year for "The Lonely Wizard", an episode presented on the CBS anthology series Schlitz Playhouse of Stars.

== Personal life and death ==
John Meston was married three times. Shortly before his army enlistment in 1942, he wed Rosemary Carver, and they had one child before divorcing in 1954. Four years later, he met Bette Ford (born Dingeldein), an actress and model who several years earlier had changed careers, becoming a professional bullfighter and the first American woman to fight "on foot" in the Plaza México, the largest bullring in the world. Ford reportedly met Meston in 1958 at MGM Studios in Los Angeles, during meetings to discuss with screenwriters a proposed biopic about Ford, a feature film that would highlight her training as an apprentice (novillera) and fights as a matador. He was one of those writers. After what was described as their "whirlwind romance", Meston and Ford were married in Las Vegas. That marriage lasted 15 years, until their divorce in 1973. Then, on April 17, 1977, just two years before his death, Meston married Mary Ann (O'Brien) Hooper.

In March 1979, Meston died at age 64 from a cerebral hemorrhage in Tarzana, California. He was survived by his wife Mary Ann and his daughter, Feather, from his marriage to Rosemary Carver. Thirteen years after his passing, the production subsidiary of CBS developed the made-for-television movie Gunsmoke: To the Last Man. That film, which was originally broadcast on January 10, 1992, is dedicated to Meston and stars James Arness, who reprised his role as Matt Dillon, although portrayed as a cattleman after his retirement as marshal of Dodge City.

In an interview following John's death, Mary Ann Meston described her husband as essentially a walking dichotomy, a complex person who defined himself and was motivated by simplicity:

John was a man of letters...A man who was basically a philosopher and poet and somehow got involved with Gunsmoke. He wrote as he thought. Everything was simple. If Matt had something to say, he said it. After a few lines, you knew the character. This was his brain...his philosophy.
