= Kathleen Hite =

American screenwriter

- Born: Mary Kathleen Hite; June 17, 1917; Wichita, Kansas, U.S.
- Died: February 18, 1989 (aged 71); Carefree, Arizona, U.S.
- Education: Wichita State University
- Occupation: Writer

Mary Kathleen Hite (June 17, 1917 – February 18, 1989) was an American writer for radio and television, including writing for the popular Western series Gunsmoke. Hite was the first female staff writer for CBS.

== Early life and education ==
Kathleen was born in Wichita, Kansas, the youngest of three children of Estelle (née Worrell) and Frank Hite. Her father was a cattleman, as was her older brother Russell, who later operated the family's ranch in New Mexico. All of her grandparents had moved to Kansas during the days of the American frontier, and she noted that all were "great storytellers" about their lives, which she absorbed as a child. After attending high school in Hutchinson, Kansas, Hite attended Wichita State University, where she majored in journalism and history.

== Career ==
Hite's career in radio and television started in Wichita, where she began working at a radio station soon after her graduation from Wichita State University. By 1943, however, she moved to Los Angeles, California and accepted a position at CBS Radio to work as a secretary. Later, the would-be writer explained how she managed at that time to circumvent the company's employment restrictions:

CBS had a policy against hiring women writers so I hired on as a secretary. I figured once I got inside the building I could destroy them from within...I badgered the head of the writing department until he gave me a chance to write.

Hite's plan quickly succeeded, for within a year she became the first woman staff writer for CBS. She subsequently noted that World War II-related labor shortages also helped her to obtain that promotion, explaining that "a producer needed a radio scriptwriter—ANY radio scriptwriter. And there I was." In the coming years, she also proposed stories and wrote scripts for several television series, including The Jane Wyman Show, Alfred Hitchcock Presents, Mystery Playhouse, Thriller, Gunsmoke, and The Waltons. Hite served as a script editor as well for The Whistler and The Adventures of Philip Marlowe in 1950. She quit CBS in late 1950/early 1951, because freelance writers were paid 350% more per script.

Hite's contributions to TV series about the American West were particularly substantive, as she wrote over 100 scripts in total for shows like Gunsmoke, Wagon Train, The Monroes, and Empire. During the 1950s and 1960s, she was among a small number of female writers for television Westerns and was identified in that period as "one of the top Cowboy-and-Indian scribes of all time".

== Awards and honors ==
Hite received the Headliner Award from the National Professional Journalism Society in 1964. She was also made an honorary member of the Choctaw Native American tribe in 1965. In 1970, she was presented the Achievement Award from Wichita State University's alumni association, which is that organization's highest honor.

== Death ==
Hite died on February 18, 1989, in Carefree, Arizona, at the age of 71.
