= The Adventures of Philip Marlowe =

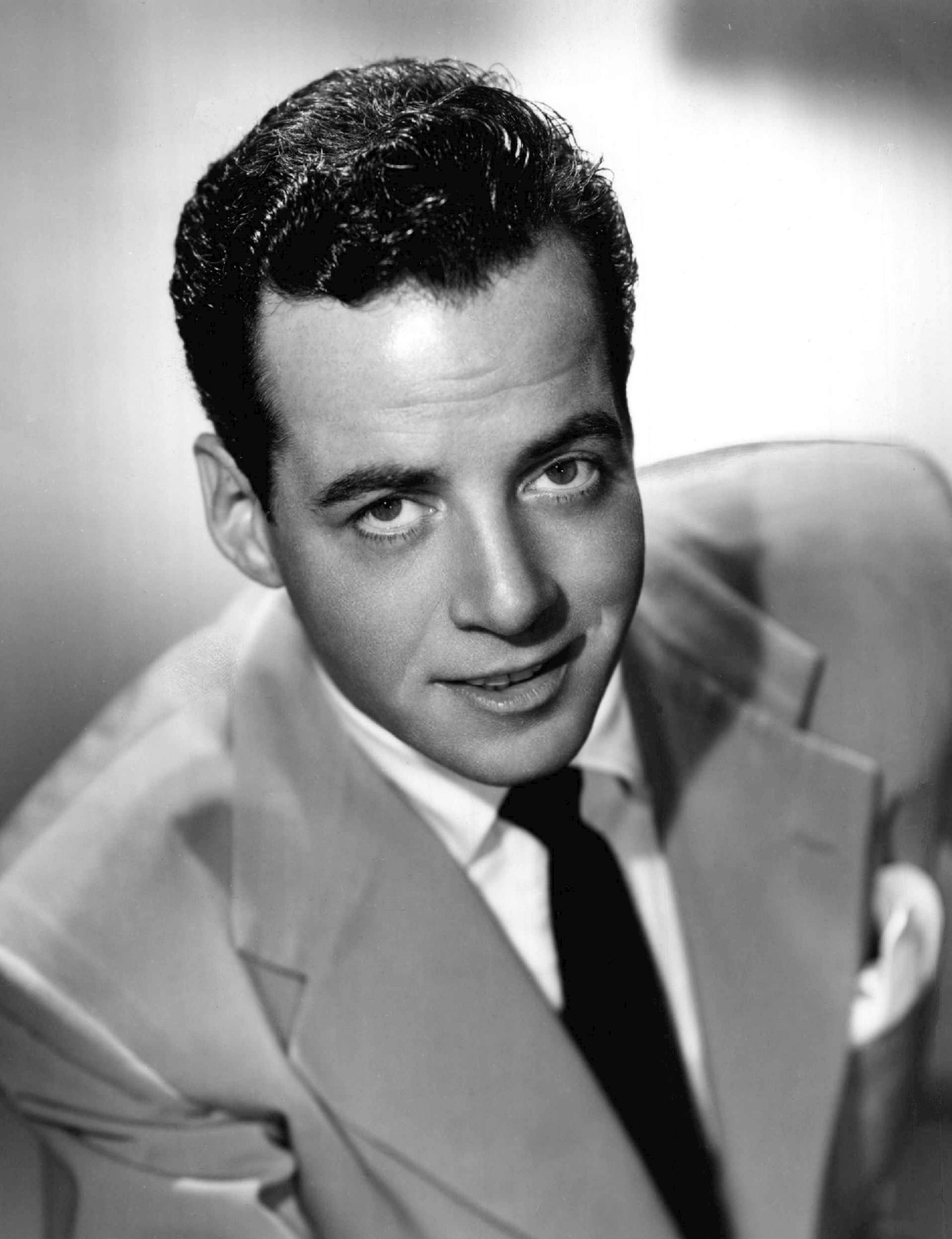
- Gerald Mohr as Philip Marlowe
- Other names: The New Adventures of Philip Marlowe
- Genre: Detective drama
- Running time: 30 minutes
- Country of origin: United States
- Language: English
- Syndicates: NBC; CBS
- TV adaptations: Philip Marlowe
- Starring: Van Heflin (NBC: 1947); Gerald Mohr (CBS: 1948–1951)
- Announcer: Wendell Niles (NBC: 1947); Roy Rowan (CBS: 1948–1951)
- Created by: Raymond Chandler
- Written by: Milton Geiger (1947); Gene Levitt (1948–1951); Robert Mitchell (1948–1951); Mel Dinelli (1948–1951); Kathleen Hite (1948–1951)
- Directed by: Norman Macdonnell (1948–1951)
- Produced by: Norman Macdonnell (1948–1951)
- Original release: June 17, 1947 – September 15, 1958

The Adventures of Philip Marlowe was a radio series featuring Raymond Chandler's private eye, Philip Marlowe. Robert C. Reinehr and Jon D. Swartz, in their book, The A to Z of Old Time Radio, noted that the program differed from most others in its genre: "It was a more hard-boiled program than many of the other private detective shows of the time, containing few quips or quaint characters."

The program first aired 17 June 1947 on NBC radio under the title The New Adventures of Philip Marlowe, with Van Heflin playing Marlowe. The show was a summer replacement for Bob Hope. The first episode adapted Chandler's short story "Red Wind". The NBC series ended 9 September 1947.

In 1948, the series moved to CBS, where it was called The Adventures of Philip Marlowe, with Gerald Mohr playing Marlowe. This series also began with an adaptation of "Red Wind", using a script different from the NBC adaptation. By 1949, it had the largest audience in radio. The CBS version ran for 114 episodes. That series ran 26 September 1948 – 29 September 1950.

From 7 July 1951 to 15 September 1951, the program was a summer replacement for Hopalong Cassidy. Mohr played Marlowe in all but one of the CBS shows. He was replaced by William Conrad in the 1950 episode, "The Anniversary Gift".

The episode "The Birds on the Wing" (aired 11-26-49) is especially notable for its beginning and ending, both uncharacteristically breaking the fourth wall. It opens with Marlowe saying he is currently reading "Chandler's latest The Little Sister" – thus a fictional character claims to be reading an actual book in which he is the main character. Even more surreal was the ending, in which Marlowe returns to his apartment to find Gracie Allen – who asks Marlowe to find her husband George Burns a radio show on which he can sing.

The program's composer during its NBC run was Lyn Murray, who worked in both film and radio at the time. The musical cue that plays over the opening narration in the series' first two episodes (where Marlowe recites the opening sentences of Chandler's original story "Red Wind") is a theme that would reappear prominently in Murray's 1954 score for Alfred Hitchcock's To Catch a Thief. Richard Aurandt was the composer for the program's CBS run with the exception of the first two episodes where the music was provided by Ivan Ditmars.

Despite the program's popularity, it had no sponsor for most of its time on the air. The lone exceptions were when Ford Motor Company and, subsequently, Wrigley's Gum sponsored it during part of 1950.

Gene D. Phillips, in the book Creatures of Darkness: Raymond Chandler, Detective Fiction, and Film Noir, reported Chandler's lack of involvement with the program: "Initially Chandler had considered asking for script approval for the Marlowe radio series, but ultimately he decided to have no connection with the scripting of the programs. He contented himself with the weekly royalties he received for the use of his character, while professing himself 'moderately pleased' with Gerald Mohr's portrayal of Marlowe."

== Cast and crew ==
The first NBC episode had a script by Milton Geiger. Chandler, in a letter to Erle Stanley Gardner, commented about his version, "It was thoroughly flat." The CBS version had a better reception. Norman Macdonnell was producer/director; Gene Levitt, Robert Mitchell, Mel Dinelli, and Kathleen Hite wrote the scripts; and Richard Aurandt was responsible for the music. Roy Rowan was announcer. Performing alongside Mohr at various times were Jeff Corey, Howard McNear, Parley Baer, Lawrence Dobkin, Virginia Gregg, Gloria Blondell, and Lou Krugman.

== Episodes ==
The following episodes are known to exist and are available for download on the web.

=== NBC Series ===
- 1947-06-17 (01) The Red Wind (from 1938 short story)
- 1947-06-24 (02) [unknown]
- 1947-07-01 (03) Daring Young Dame on The Flying Trapeze
- 1947-07-08 (04) The King in Yellow (from 1938 short story)
- 1947-07-15 (05) [unknown]
- 1947-07-22 (06) Goldfish - [lost episode] (from 1936 short story)
- 1947-07-29 (07) [unknown]
- 1947-08-05 (08) Trouble Is My Business (from 1939 short story)
- 1947-08-12 (09) [unknown]
- 1947-08-19 (10) Robin and the Hood
- 1947-08-26 (11) [unknown]
- 1947-09-02 (12) [unknown]
- 1947-09-09 (13) [unknown]

=== CBS Series ===
- 48-09-26 (001) The Red Wind (from 1938 short story)
- 48-10-03 (002) The Persian Slippers
- 48-10-10 (003) The Panama Hat
- 48-10-17 (004) Where There's a Will
- 48-10-24 (005) The Heart of Gold
- 48-10-31 (006) The Blue Burgonet
- 48-11-07 (007) [unknown]
- 48-11-14 (008) The Silent Partner - [lost episode]
- 48-11-21 (009) The Perfect Secretary - [lost episode]
- 48-11-28 (010) The Hard Way Out
- 48-12-05 (011) The Unhappy Medium - [lost episode]
- 48-12-12 (012) The Jade Teardrop - [lost episode]
- 48-12-19 (013) The Three Wiseguys - [lost episode]
- 48-12-26 (014) The Old Acquaintance
- 49-01-08 (015) The Restless Day
- 49-01-15 (016) The Black Halo
- 49-01-22 (017) The Orange Dog
- 49-01-29 (018) The Easy Mark
- 49-02-05 (019) The Long Rope
- 49-02-12 (020) The Lonesome Reunion
- 49-02-19 (021) [unknown]
- 49-02-26 (022) The Big Mistake - [lost episode]
- 49-03-05 (023) Friend from Detroit
- 49-03-12 (024) Grim Hunters
- 49-03-19 (025) The Dancing Hands
- 49-03-26 (026) The Green Flame
- 49-04-02 (027) The Last Laugh
- 49-04-09 (028) Name to Remember
- 49-04-16 (029) The Heat Wave
- 49-04-23 (030) Cloak of Kamehameha
- 49-04-30 (031) Lady in Mink
- 49-05-07 (032) Feminine Touch
- 49-05-14 (033) The Promise to Pay
- 49-05-21 (034) Night Tide
- 49-05-28 (035) The Ebony Link
- 49-06-04 (036) The Unfair Lady
- 49-06-11 (037) The Pigeons Blood
- 49-06-18 (038) The Busy Body
- 49-06-25 (039) The Key Man
- 49-07-02 (040) Dude from Manhattan
- 49-07-09 (041) The Quiet Number - [lost episode]
- 49-07-16 (042) The Headless Peacock
- 49-07-30 (043) The Mexican Boat Ride
- 49-08-06 (044) The August Lion
- 49-08-13 (045) The Indian Giver
- 49-08-20 (046) The Lady Killer
- 49-08-27 (047) The Eager Witness
- 49-09-03 (048) The Bum's Rush
- 49-09-10 (049) Rustin Hickory
- 49-09-17 (050) The Baton Sinister
- 49-09-24 (051) The Fatted Calf
- 49-10-01 (052) The Tale of the Mermaid
- 49-10-08 (053) The Open Window
- 49-10-15 (054) The Strangle Hold
- 49-10-22 (055) The Smokeout
- 49-10-29 (056) The Green Witch
- 49-11-05 (057) The Fine Italian Hand
- 49-11-12 (058) The Gorgeous Lyre - [lost episode]
- 49-11-19 (059) The Sweet Thing - [lost episode]
- 49-11-26 (060) The Birds on the Wing
- 49-12-03 (061) The Kid on the Corner
- 49-12-10 (062) The Little Wishbone
- 49-12-17 (063) The Lowest Bid - [lost episode]
- 49-12-24 (064) Carol's Christmas - [lost episode]
- 49-12-31 (065) The House That Jacqueline Built
- 50-01-07 (066) The Torch Carriers
- 50-01-14 (067) The Covered Bridge
- 50-01-21 (068) The Bid for Freedom
- 50-01-28 (069) The Hairpin Turn
- 50-02-07 (070) The Long Arm
- 50-02-14 (071) The Grim Echo
- 50-02-21 (072) The Ladies Night
- 50-02-28 (073) The Big Step
- 50-03-07 (074) The Monkey's Uncle
- 50-03-14 (075) The Vital Statistic
- 50-03-21 (076) The Deep Shadow
- 50-03-28 (077) The Sword of Cebu
- 50-04-04 (078) The Man on the Roof
- 50-04-11 (079) The Anniversary Gift (William Conrad)
- 50-04-18 (080) The Angry Eagle
- 50-04-25 (081) The High Collared Cape
- 50-05-02 (082) The Seahorse Jockey
- 50-05-09 (083) The Hiding Place
- 50-05-16 (084) Cloak of Kamehameha
- 50-05-23 (085) The Fox's Tail
- 50-05-30 (086) Bedside Manners
- 50-06-06 (087) The Uneasy Head
- 50-06-14 (088) Face to Forget
- 50-06-21 (089) Gold Cobra
- 50-06-28 (090) The Pelican's Roost
- 50-07-05 (091) The Girl from Pitchfork Corners
- 50-07-12 (092) The Iron Coffin
- 50-07-19 (093) The Last Wish
- 50-07-28 (094) The Glass Donkey
- 50-08-04 (095) The Parrot's Bed
- 50-08-11 (096) The Quiet Magpie
- 50-08-18 (097) The Dark Tunnel
- 50-08-25 (098) The Collector's Item
- 50-09-01 (099) The Soft Spot
- 50-09-08 (100) The Fifth Mask
- 50-09-15 (101) The Final Payment
- 50-09-22 (102) The White Carnation
- 50-09-29 (103) The Big Book
- 51-07-07 (104) A Seaside Sabbatical
- 51-07-14 (105) The Dear, Dead Days
- 51-07-21 (106) Life Can Be Murder
- 51-07-28 (107) Good Neighbor Policy
- 51-08-04 (108) Long Way Home
- 51-08-11 (109) Friday's Child - [lost episode]
- 51-08-18 (110) Young Man's Fancy
- 51-08-25 (111) Heir for G String
- 51-09-01 (112) Nether Nether Land
- 51-09-08 (113) The Medium Was Rare
- 51-09-15 (114) Sound and the Unsound

Other radio programs featuring Philip Marlowe:

- Lux Radio Theater 45-06-11 Murder My Sweet
- Hollywood Star Time 46-06-08 Murder My Sweet
- Lux Radio Theater 48-02-09 Lady in the Lake
