= Norman Macdonnell =

American radio and television producer (1916–1979)

- Born: Norman Scarth Macdonnell; November 8, 1916; Pasadena, California, U.S.
- Died: November 28, 1979 (aged 63); Burbank, California, U.S.
- Occupations: Television producer, radio director
- Years active: 1938–1975
- Spouse: Judith Estelle Murray (m. 1946)
- Children: 1

Norman Scarth Macdonnell (November 8, 1916 – November 28, 1979) was an American producer for radio, television, and feature films. He is best known for co-creating with writer John Meston the Western series Gunsmoke, which was broadcast on CBS Radio from 1952 to 1961, and on television from 1955 to 1975.

Other radio series that Macdonnell either produced, directed, or at various times wrote scripts for include Suspense, Escape, The Adventures of Philip Marlowe, Fort Laramie, Rogers of the Gazette, and Have Gun – Will Travel. He was also a long-time executive producer for the NBC television series The Virginian.

== Early life ==
Norman Scarth Macdonnell was born in California in 1916. Named in honor of his paternal grandfather, he was the youngest of four children of Alice L. (née Talcott) and James S. Macdonnell. James had immigrated to the United States from Canada in 1902 and by 1920 was a bank president in Pasadena. With regard to Norman's education, after high school he completed three years of college before joining the military just prior to the United States' formal involvement in World War II. On December 2, 1941—only five days before Japan's attack on Pearl Harbor—he enlisted in the United States Army. Later in the war, in 1944, he was among the first divisions of American soldiers that invaded Nazi-occupied France on D-Day.

== Radio career ==
Three years before his enlistment in the army, Macdonnell's radio career had begun in Los Angeles at station KNX, which served as the center for West Coast or "Hollywood" programming for the Columbia Broadcasting System's nationwide network. He initially worked as a studio tour guide at KNX and as a low-level assistant or "page" for staff affiliated with CBS. He then began working as a general technician on radio productions, and he founded the "Columbia Radio Players", a career-training workshop for CBS employees. It was there where Macdonnell gained instruction in voice acting and his early knowledge about organizing and directing radio broadcasts. In 1946, after returning to California from his service in World War II, he resumed his employment in Los Angeles with CBS Radio and was soon involved with directing several of the network's most popular dramatic programs, anthology series, instructional shows, and comedies. Some of those were Suspense, Doorway to Life, Escape, The Adventures of Philip Marlowe, Romance, and The Harold Peary Show. While working on Escape, which premiered in July 1947, Macdonnell started working with writer John Meston with whom he would collaborate on future projects, including the radio and television versions of Gunsmoke and the 1956 radio series Fort Laramie. (Note: Gunsmoke: A Complete History and Analysis of the Legendary Broadcast Series by SuzAnne and Gabor Barabas is a comprehensive reference regarding the development of both the radio and television series. It provides profiles of every episode broadcast in the two media and includes a photograph of Macdonnell with Meston on page 232.)

=== Gunsmoke on radio ===
In 1949 executives and programmers at CBS Radio began planning a new weekly Western for the network, one inspired by Straight Arrow, which was then being broadcast nationally by another company, Mutual Broadcasting System. That series had proven to be very popular among juvenile listeners; however, due to contractual complications the proposed CBS series was shelved. Two years later Macdonnell and Meston discovered the proposal while developing their own concept for a Western, although one they envisioned—unlike Straight Arrow—to be targeted at a much more mature audience, a series that Macdonnell referred to as an "'adult Western'". Adapting elements from the 1949 proposal, the two men expanded on the background narratives relating to their series' general chronology and specific location. Set in the 1870s, stories were situated in southwestern Kansas, centered principally in the rowdy, "hard-drinking" cattle town of Dodge City. Originally, Macdonnell and Meston planned to name their new Western Jeff Spain, after a character they created and used earlier in several episodes of an anthology series they had done. Their boss at CBS, Harry Ackerman, and other network executives dismissed that title, preferring Gunsmoke, a program heading that Ackerman himself was credited with conceiving.

Once given permission to proceed with Gunsmoke, Macdonnell began developing a detailed production schedule for the new series' 30-minute episodes and arranging auditions to cast its recurring characters. His and Meston's "Jeff Spain" soon became United States Marshal Matt Dillon, and veteran voice actor William Conrad was chosen by Macdonnell, Meston, and two other CBS screeners to portray that lead character. Other seasoned actors soon filled the needed regular supporting roles, including Parley Baer as Marshal Dillon's trusty assistant Chester Proudfoot, Howard McNear as Dr. Charles "Doc" Adams, and Georgia Ellis, whose initial role in the series would quickly evolve into the saloon "hostess" Kitty Russell. Gunsmoke was broadcast for the first time from radio station KNX in Hollywood on Saturday, April 26, 1952. The premiere episode, "Billy the Kid", was well received by both critics and the general public; and in the weeks that followed the ratings for Gunsmoke steadily grew. The critic for the influential trade paper Variety praised the first episode's story and acting, and he commended Macdonnell's direction in particular, describing the new series as "a blazing radioater...with top thesping and scripting values that pull it way ahead of the pack of AM westerns." The growing number of fan letters received by CBS appeared to confirm Variety's assessment and to reflect the type of audience that Macdonnell and Meston intended to attract, for much of the complimentary mail arriving at the network "came from a highly educated section of the population".

Following the successful premiere of Gunsmoke, Macdonnell's work as producer and director and Meston's scripts would dominate for years the radio series' weekly episodes, which were often complimented in reviews in trade publications for their voice acting, dialogue, pacing, music, and sound effects. Macdonnell's contributions to the now-classic Western were numerous and profound. He not only produced and directed many radio episodes of Gunsmoke, he also wrote and co-wrote some broadcasts during the series' nine-year run on radio. Yet, in interviews he was quick to express his admiration for the stories produced on "Meston's 'grubby little typewriter'" and to credit Meston for establishing very high, consistent standards for the content of Gunsmoke's episodes throughout the 1950s and into the 1960s. (Note: All of the radio episodes, their respective writers, and their initial broadcast dates are provided at the internal link "List of Gunsmoke radio episodes".)

=== Other radio series, 1950s ===
Along with his ongoing responsibilities with the radio broadcasts of Gunsmoke from 1952 through the rest of that decade, Macdonnell managed to direct for CBS several other well-established and new series during the 1950s. He continued to direct episodes of Suspense and Escape; and prior to the premiere of Gunsmoke he directed the short-lived comedy series The Harold Peary Show, which aired between 1950 and 1951 and was presented in an unusual format, as "a radio show within a radio show". Then, in 1956, Macdonnell produced and directed another 30-minute radio "Old West" drama, Fort Laramie That series' lead character is a cavalry officer, Captain Lee Quince, performed by Raymond Burr, who a year later would move to television and star on Perry Mason. Collaborating with Macdonnell on Fort Laramie was his Gunsmoke colleague John Meston, who wrote many episodes for the new series, including the one for its initial broadcast from Hollywood on Sunday afternoon, January 22, 1956. In its review of that premiere episode for Fort Laramie, Variety once again focused special attention on Macdonnell's directorial "touches":

Although the yarn was reminiscent of a typical Roy Rogers or Gene Autry oater, it was well written and producer-director Norman Macdonnell gave it an added lift via some fancy production trappings. His sound effects, for example, were so effective that they might well have rated a separate billing.

Despite receiving additional positive reviews from media critics, CBS cancelled Fort Laramie by October 28, 1956, after broadcasting only 41 episodes. Macdonnell, though, remained busy working on Gunsmoke's weekly radio installments, as well as on the series' recent adaptation to television. Since the late 1940s, the adaptation of a series popular radio show to the rapidly expanding medium of television was fairly common occurrence in the broadcast industry. However, such adaptations in reverse—the creation a radio version of an already successful television series—was rarely done. Macdonnell was presented with that challenge in 1958. On television, the weekly series Have Gun—Will Travel had premiered in September 1957 and quickly established itself as a critical and financial hit for CBS. The star of that television Western was Richard Boone in the role of "Paladin", a well-educated, cultured resident of 1870s San Francisco who advertised his services as a gunfighter or well-armed "negotiator" for hire.

Wanting to capitalize further on the popularity of Have Gun—Will Travel, CBS decided to duplicate the series on radio with veteran character actor John Dehner performing in the same role as Boone. Macdonnell, who reportedly had promoted the radio-adaptation idea inside the network, was assigned to organize and direct the episodes. The first episode, "Strange Vendetta", aired on November 23, 1958, a year and a half after its televised counterpart. At a time when radio dramas, adventure series, and comedies were increasingly being abandoned by sponsors and audiences in favor of televised programming, the "duplicate" of Have Gun—Will Travel proved successful, continuing for over two years with 106 episodes being broadcast.

== Television ==
=== Gunsmoke on the "small screen" ===
In 1955, Macdonnell and John Meston's radio version of Gunsmoke was adapted to television; and that year, on September 10, it was broadcast on the "small screen" for the first time. The series would remain a staple in CBS Television's weekly lineup of programming for 20 years, becoming over that time "the longest-running prime-time drama series in TV history". (Note: All the titles of the televised episodes of Gunsmoke (1955-1975), their original airing dates, and the director and writer(s) of each episode are provided at the following Wikipedia link: List of Gunsmoke television episodes.) Yet, unlike the radio series, Macdonnell and John Meston would not be the chief developers of Gunsmoke's adaptation to television. Macdonnell was widely respected in the radio industry and within CBS itself, but he was not assigned by the network to serve as the initial producer and director for the series' early televised presentations. CBS chose others with more experience in films and television for those responsibilities, including, most notably, someone with far more "impressive credentials in directing films, especially Westerns": Charles Marquis Warren.

After Gunsmoke's premiere on television, both Macdonnell and Meston remained busy with the new episodes of the radio series and with adapting episodes already broadcast on CBS Radio for replay in a visual format. The radio version of the series continued to be popular for several years after the debut of its televised counterpart with James Arness, Dennis Weaver, Milburn Stone, and Amanda Blake in their respective roles as Marshal Dillon, Chester (his surname changed from Proudfoot to Goode), Doc, and Kitty. By 1958, in fact, the two formats of the series were together drawing a weekly audience of 55 million listeners and viewers. Macdonnell by then was already serving too as producer of Gunsmoke on television, having been assigned to replace Warren, who left the series at the end of its second season due to "fatigue" and to pursue other projects. While Warren's guidance had firmly established Gunsmoke as a popular and critical success on television as well, the series "achieved its greatest popularity" under Macdonnell's control. Between 1957 and 1961, the television series earned the ranking as America's top show in the Nielsen ratings for four consecutive seasons. Macdonnell would remain with the series until the fall of 1964, when he was "suddenly" dismissed due to creative differences with the head of CBS Television and due to continuing production problems the series' was having with its expansion to a one-hour format.

=== Other television series and movies ===
Macdonnell produced other television programs outside his work for Gunsmoke. In 1958 he found time to produce "The Dungeon", an installment for the CBS anthology series Playhouse 90, and "Mountain Man", an episode for yet another CBS series, the post-Civil War Western The Texan with Rory Calhoun. Then, after leaving Gunsmoke, he began working for CBS competitor NBC, serving as executive producer on over 110 episodes of another long-running Western series, The Virginian (1962–1971), starring James Drury, starting with its fourth season. In 1965, Macdonnell was also a producer of "The Easter Breach", an episode for NBC's series Kraft Suspense Theatre. He then produced an additional televised Western, The Road West, which aired briefly during the 1966-1967 broadcast season.

Not all of Macdonnell's production work was limited to radio and television series. For Universal Pictures in 1967 he produced the comedy feature film The Ballad of Josie starring Doris Day in the title role. Two years later he produced for Universal's television division the made-for-television movie This Savage Land; and then in 1974, five years before his death, he completed production of another television Western movie, McMasters of Sweetwater.

== Personal life and death ==
On January 6, 1946, in Pasadena, Macdonnell married Judith E. (née Bennett) Murray, a native of Butte, Montana. The couple subsequently had one child, a daughter; and they remained married until Norman's death in 1979. On November 28 that year, less than three weeks after his 63rd birthday, he died of kidney failure at a hospital in Burbank, California.
