= The Harold Peary Show =

American radio situation comedy series (1950–1951)

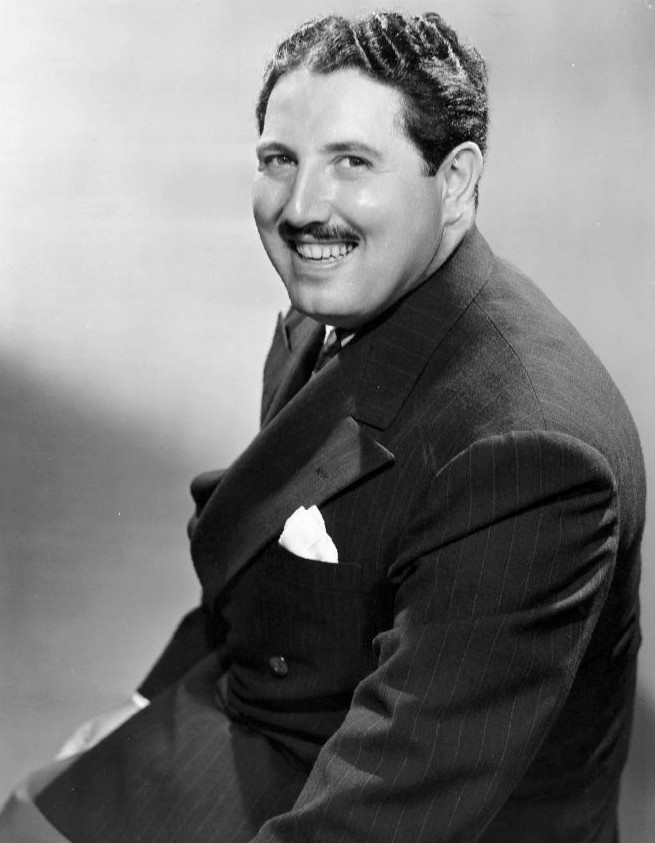
- Harold Peary (1952)
- Other names: The Hal Peary Show; Honest Harold
- Genre: Situation comedy
- Running time: 30 minutes
- Country of origin: United States
- Language: English
- Syndicates: CBS
- Starring: Harold Peary
- Announcer: Bob LeMond
- Written by: Harold Peary; Gene Stone; Bill Danch; Jack Robinson
- Directed by: Norman Macdonnell
- Original release: September 17, 1950 – June 13, 1951

The Harold Peary Show is a radio situation comedy broadcast in the United States September 17, 1950 – June 13, 1951 on CBS. Some sources refer to the program as Honest Harold. or The Hal Peary Show.

== Background ==
The period 1948-1950 brought major changes to network radio, as CBS hired a number of stars from NBC in what some have called "talent raids". Some of the top performers who changed networks were Jack Benny, Red Skelton, Edgar Bergen, and the husband-and-wife duo George Burns and Gracie Allen. One result of the changes was that 12 of the 15 highest-rated radio programs at the end of 1949 were on CBS.

Harold Peary did not find such success, however. Peary switched to CBS, while the program in which he had starred, The Great Gildersleeve, stayed on NBC. Those changes resulted in a new program (The Harold Peary Show) for Peary and a new star (Willard Waterman) for Gildersleeve. Radio historian John Dunning commented that The Harold Peary Show "failed to gain any measure of an audience in its lone season".

== Format ==
The Harold Peary Show featured a radio show within a radio show. The main character, Harold Hemp—called "Honest Harold," was host of a program called "The Happy Homemaker". As one would expect from a situation comedy, humor arose from Hemp's interaction with other characters in the episodes. They included his mother, his nephew, a marshal, a doctor, the radio station's switchboard operator, and girlfriends.

== Problems ==
Although not an exact duplicate, The Harold Peary Show bore much similarity—perhaps too much similarity—to The Great Gildersleeve. Dunning wrote, "Peary tried with Honest Harold to do Gildy all over again." One old-time radio website commented: "The new show also borrowed a few Gildersleeve plot devices, such as running for mayor and engagements to two women. In what was possibly a desperate attempt to recreate the Gildersleeve magic, it even brought in actress Shirley Mitchell, virtually recreating her Gildersleeve role of Leila Ransom, under the name of Florabelle Breckenridge."

The program was knocked in at least two published articles. Dunning wrote about a review in Radio Life magazine that he summarized, in part, as follows: "Waterman was a 'splendid' replacement in a tough situation ... he won over the studio audience ... cast members rooted for him wholeheartedly ... Waterman's own intrinsic thespian integrity contributed to an initial performance that was greeted with enthusiasm. The same review panned Honest Harold as derivative, unexciting, and, in the end, 'just another show.'" Meanwhile, media critic John Crosby commented in a column published March 1, 1951:

Last summer, the intellectual hierarchy at the Columbia Broadcasting System announced triumphantly that they had absconded with one more NBC star, namely Harold Peary who had been "The Great Gildersleve" on NBC since the year two. Mr. Peary, said CBS, had been signed to a seven year contract and would create a new show and a new character for that network. It must have seemed like a bright idea at the time. Events have proved it to be an unqualified disaster both for the network and Mr. Peary.

A newspaper obituary for Peary commented about The Harold Peary Show, "That series, however, never achieved the popularity of Gildersleeve and gradually faded away."

== Characters and cast ==
In addition to Peary as Honest Harold Hemp, the main characters and the actors who played them were as follows:

Character	Actor or Actress
Mrs. Hemp (Harold's mother)	Kathryn Card; Jane Morgan
Marvin (Harold's nephew)	Sammy Ogg
Gloria (switchboard operator)	Gloria Holliday (Mrs. Harold Peary in real life)
Doctor "Yak Yak" Yancey (veterinarian)	Joseph Kearns
Pete the marshal	Parley Baer
Miss Turner (the teacher)	June Whitley
Evelina (a girlfriend)	Mary Jane Croft
Stanley Peabody (station manager)	Olan Soule

Bob LeMond was the announcer, and Jack Meakin led the orchestra. Norman Macdonnell was the director.

== See also ==
- Harold Peary—the star of The Harold Peary Show
- The Great Gildersleeve—the program that Peary left when he moved to CBS
- The New Andy Griffith Show—a 1971 TV series that similarly tried to cast Andy Griffith as a similar character with a different name to the one he played on The Andy Griffith Show
