= Fort Laramie (radio series) =

1956 Radio series

- Starring: Raymond Burr
- Directed by: Norman Macdonnell
- Original release: January 22 – October 28, 1956
- No. of episodes: 41

Fort Laramie is a CBS Radio Western series starring Raymond Burr as Captain Lee Quince. It aired Sunday afternoons January 22–October 28, 1956, at 5:30 pm ET. Produced and directed by Norman Macdonnell, this Western drama depicted life at old Fort Laramie during the 19th Century. The 41 episodes starred Raymond Burr as Lee Quince, captain of the cavalry. One year later, Burr became a television star as Perry Mason.

== Premise ==
In the series, the fort had 400 troops in all but they had to keep their eye on a nearby Indian reservation with 4,000 Sioux camped there. Major Ned Daggart led the troops and he didn't always see eye to eye with Quince. Daggart had a niece called Terrie Lawson, who had her eye on the Captain.

== Production ==
Fort Laramie had a lot of crossover with Gunsmoke, which was also directed by Norman Macdonnell. It shared writers, sound effects men, and many of the same actors. Gunsmoke writers Kathleen Hite scripted 27 of the episodes; John Dunkel, five; John Meston, four; and Les Crutchfield, two. The remaining scripts were written by Gil Doud, E. Jack Newman and William Robson.

Supporting regulars included Vic Perrin as Sgt. Gorse, Harry Bartell as the slightly green Lt. Seiberts and Jack Moyles as Major Daggett. Heard on a more irregular basis were Howard McNear as Pliny the fort sutler, Sam Edwards as Trooper Harrison, and in a variety of roles, such actors as John Dehner, John McIntire, Virginia Gregg, James Nusser, Parley Baer and Barney Phillips. All except star Raymond Burr had been heard on Macdonnell's other Western radio series, Gunsmoke. Amerigo Marino supplied the music. The scripts were mostly written by John Meston, Kathleen Hite, Les Crutchfield and John Dunkel.

John Dehner originally auditioned for the part of Lee Quince in a story that was later remade with Burr in the lead, called "The Boatwright's Story".

Fort Laramie was a sustained show (unsponsored) for most of its run.
