= Raymond Chandler bibliography =

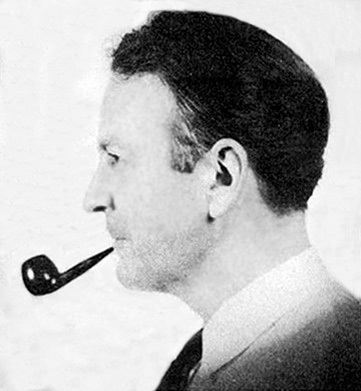
Raymond Chandler c. 1943

Raymond Chandler (1888–1950) was an American-British novelist and screenwriter. He was born in Chicago, Illinois and lived in the United States until he was seven, when his parents separated and his Anglo-Irish mother brought him to live near London; he was educated at Dulwich College from 1900. After working briefly for the British Civil Service, he became a part-time teacher at Dulwich, supplementing his income as a journalist and writer—mostly for The Westminster Gazette and The Academy. His output—consisting largely of poems and essays—was not to his taste, and his biographer Paul Bishop considers the work as "lifeless", while Contemporary Authors describes it as "lofty in subject and mawkish in tone". Chandler returned to the United States in 1912 where he trained to become an accountant in Los Angeles. In 1917, he enlisted in the Canadian Expeditionary Force, saw combat in the trenches in France where he was wounded, and was undergoing flight training in the fledgling Royal Air Force when the war ended.

Chandler returned to the United States in 1919 to rekindle his literary career, but instead took a job with an oil company until he was fired in 1932 following a bout of depression, womanizing and heavy drinking. He began writing crime stories for the pulp magazines Black Mask, Detective Fiction Weekly, The Fortnightly Intruder and Dime Detective. Between 1933 and 1941, Chandler wrote 22 short stories. In the next 17 years he wrote only three more. In the mid-1940s, some of the first 22 began appearing in inexpensive paperback and hardcover collections published by Avon Books and World Publishing Co. In 1950, Houghton Mifflin published the hardcover collection The Simple Art of Murder, containing a dozen stories selected by Chandler and an essay on mystery stories. Eight stories that he had "cannibalized" (his term) while writing his novels were omitted at his request. After Chandler's death, these eight were published in Killer in the Rain (1964). Selected stories from The Simple Art of Murder were subsequently published in additional paperback and hardcover editions. In 1939, at the behest of the publisher Alfred A. Knopf, Sr., Chandler wrote his first novel, The Big Sleep, for which he used parts of his short stories "Killer in the Rain" (1935) and "The Curtain" (1936). He went on to write seven novels, all of which featured the character Philip Marlowe.

In 1944, Chandler was asked by Paramount Pictures to write the script for the film Double Indemnity with Billy Wilder; the film was nominated for the Academy Award for Best Adapted Screenplay. It was the first of seven scripts Chandler wrote, although two of them were unused. In 1959, Chandler died of pneumonia, brought on by alcoholism. In the aftermath of his death, many of his unpublished writings—including letters, literary criticism and prose and poetry—were released. His biographer, Tom Williams, considers that Chandler's name has become "a touchstone for crime writing, representing not just excellent fiction, but also a type of writing that is at once powerful and beautiful."

== Publications in periodicals and newspapers ==
"The Rose-Leaf Romance" and "Organ Music" are an early short story and an early poem that were included in a collection, but their first printing is unknown.

Chandler's stories, poems and other publications in periodicals and newspapers
| Title | Date of publication | Periodical | Notes |
|---|---|---|---|
| "The Unknown Love" | December 19, 1908 | Chambers's Journal | Poem |
| "The Poet's Knowledge" | March 3, 1909 | The Westminster Gazette | Poem |
| "The Soul's Defiance" | March 5, 1909 | The Westminster Gazette | Poem |
| "The Wheel" | March 25, 1909 | The Westminster Gazette | Poem |
| "Art" | April 16, 1909 | The Westminster Gazette | Poem |
| "A Woman's Way" | April 22, 1909 | The Westminster Gazette | Poem |
| "The Quest" | June 2, 1909 | The Westminster Gazette | Poem |
| "When I was King" | June 9, 1909 | The Westminster Gazette | Poem |
| "The Hour of Chaos" | June 18, 1909 | The Westminster Gazette | Poem |
| "The Bed of Roses" | June 29, 1909 | The Westminster Gazette | Poem |
| "The Reformer" | July 29, 1909 | The Westminster Gazette | Poem |
| "The Perfect Knight" | September 30, 1909 | The Westminster Gazette | Poem |
| "The Pilgrim in Mediation" | November 8, 1909 | The Westminster Gazette | Poem |
| "The Pioneer" | November 17, 1909 | The Westminster Gazette | Poem |
| "The Hermit" | February 28, 1910 | The Westminster Gazette | Poem |
| "The Dancer" | May 14, 1910 | The Academy | Poem |
| "The Death of the King" | July 16, 1910 | The Spectator | Poem |
| "The Clay God" | January 4, 1911 | The Westminster Gazette | Poem |
| (Untitled) | March 18, 1911 | The Academy | Review of The Broad Highway by Jeffery Farnol |
| "The Unseen Planets" | April 21, 1911 | The Westminster Gazette | Poem |
| "The Tears That Sweeten Woe" | May 1, 1911 | The Westminster Gazette | Poem |
| "The Fairy King" | May 3, 1911 | The Westminster Gazette | Poem |
| (Untitled) | June 16, 1911 | The Westminster Gazette | Poem |
| "The Genteel Artist" | August 19, 1911 | The Academy | Essay |
| "The Remarkable Hero" | September 9, 1911 | The Academy | Essay |
| "The Literary Fop" | November 4, 1911 | The Academy | Essay |
| "An Old House" | November 15, 1911 | The Westminster Gazette | Poem |
| (Untitled) | December 23, 1911 | The Academy | Book review of The Reason Why by Elinor Glyn |
| "Realism and Fairyland" | January 6, 1912 | The Academy | Essay |
| "The Tropical Romance" | January 20, 1912 | The Academy | Essay |
| "Houses to Let" | February 24, 1912 | The Academy | Essay |
| "The King" | March 1, 1912 | The Westminster Gazette | Poem |
| "Time Shall Not Die" | April 25, 1912 | The Westminster Gazette | Poem |
| "The Art of Loving and Dying" | June 22, 1912 | The Academy | Review of The Drama of Love and Death by Edward Carpenter |
| "The Rural Labourer at Home" | June 22, 1912 | The Academy | Review of Change in the Village by George Bourne |
| "The Phrasemaker" | June 29, 1912 | The Academy | Essay |
| "Blackmailers Don't Shoot" | December 1933 | Black Mask | Story |
| "Smart-Aleck Kill" | July 1934 | Black Mask | Story |
| "Finger Man" | October 1934 | Black Mask | Story |
| "Killer in the Rain" | January 1935 | Black Mask | Story |
| "Nevada Gas" | June 1935 | Black Mask | Story |
| "Spanish Blood" | November 1935 | Black Mask | Story |
| "Guns at Cyrano's" | July 1936 | Black Mask | Story |
| "The Man Who Liked Dogs" | March 1936 | Black Mask | Story |
| "Pickup on Noon Street" | May 30, 1936 | Detective Fiction Weekly | Story, originally published as "Noon Street Nemesis" |
| "Goldfish" | June 1936 | Black Mask | Story |
| "The Curtain" | September 1936 | Black Mask | Story |
| "Try the Girl" | January 1937 | Black Mask | Story |
| "About the Article on Floral Arrangement" | June 15, 1937 | The Fortnightly Intruder | Letter |
| "A Second Letter from R C Esq" | July 1, 1937 | The Fortnightly Intruder | Letter |
| "Mandarin's Jade" | November 1937 | Dime Detective | Story |
| "Red Wind" | January 1938 | Dime Detective | Story |
| "The King in Yellow" | March 1938 | Dime Detective | Story |
| "Bay City Blues" | June 1938 | Dime Detective | Story |
| "The Lady in the Lake" | January 1939 | Dime Detective | Story |
| "Pearls Are a Nuisance" | April 1939 | Dime Detective | Story |
| "Trouble Is My Business" | August 1939 | Dime Detective | Story |
| "I'll Be Waiting" | October 14, 1939 | The Saturday Evening Post | Story |
| "The Bronze Door" | November 1939 | Unknown | Story |
| "No Crime in the Mountains" | September 1941 | Detective Story Magazine | Story |
| "The Simple Art of Murder" | December 1944 | The Atlantic Monthly | Article |
| "Writers in Hollywood" | November 1945 | The Atlantic Monthly | Article |
| "The Hollywood Bowl" | January 1947 | The Atlantic Monthly | Review of The Golden Egg by James Pollock |
| " 'Pros' and Cons" | May 1947 | Harper's Magazine | Letter |
| "Critical Notes" | July 1947 | The Screen Writer | – |
| "Oscar Night in Hollywood" | March 1948 | The Atlantic Monthly | Article |
| "Studies in Extinction" | April 1948 | The Atlantic Monthly | Review of Murders Plain and Fanciful by James Sandoe |
| "10 Greatest Crimes of the Century" | October 1948 | Cosmopolitan | Article |
| "The Little Sister" | April 1949 | Cosmopolitan | Prepublication abridgement |
| "The Simple Art of Murder" | April 15, 1950 | The Saturday Review of Literature | Article |
| (Untitled) | May 1951 | The Author | Letter |
| "Professor Bingo's Snuff" part 1 | June 1951 | Park East | Story |
| "Professor Bingo's Snuff" part 2 | July 1951 | Park East | Story |
| "Professor Bingo's Snuff" part 3 | August 1951 | Park East | Story |
| "Ten Per Cent of Your Life" | February 1952 | The Atlantic Monthly | Article |
| (Untitled) | July 1952 | Fantastic | Autobiographical note accompanying reprint of "Professor Bingo's Snuff" |
| "Ruth Ellis—Should She Hang" | June 30, 1955 | London Evening Standard | Letter |
| "A Letter From London" | September 1955 | The Third Degree | Letter |
| "Bonded Goods" | March 25, 1956 | The Sunday Times | Review of Diamonds Are Forever by Ian Fleming |
| "Crosstown with Neil Morgan" | March 1, 1957 | San Diego Evening Tribune | Guest Column |
| "Raymond Chandler Writes a Blunt Letter to the Daily Express" | June 18, 1957 | Daily Express | Letter |
| "A Star Writer's Advice to Writers (and Editors)" | June 18, 1957 | Daily Express | Letter |
| "Crosstown with Neil Morgan" | July 12, 1957 | San Diego Evening Tribune | Guest Column |
| "Crosstown with Neil Morgan" | March 8, 1958 | San Diego Evening Tribune | Guest Column |
| "The Terrible Dr No" | March 30, 1958 | The Sunday Times | Review of Dr. No by Ian Fleming |
| "Playback" part 1 | October 1958 | Suspense | Story |
| "Playback" part 2 | November 1958 | Suspense | Story |
| "Detective Story as an Art Form" | March 1959 | The Crime Writer | Article |
| "Marlowe Takes on the Syndicate" | 1959 – April 10, 1959 | Daily Mail | Story – published posthumously |
| "Crosstown with Neil Morgan" | August 25, 1959 | San Diego Evening Tribune | Guest Column – published posthumously |
| "Raymond Chandler" | December 1959 | The London Magazine | Appreciation of Chandler by Ian Fleming; includes letters from Chandler – published posthumously |
| "Private Eye" | February 25, 1962 | The Sunday Times | Prepublication excerpts – published posthumously |
| "Farewell, My Hollywood" | June 1976 | Antaeus | Article – published posthumously |
| "English Summer" | August 1976 | Antaeus | Story – published posthumously |

Interviews with Chandler
| Title | Date of publication | Periodical | Notes |
|---|---|---|---|
| "He Makes Murder Pay" | July 1946 | Pageant | Chandler interviewed by Irving Wallace |
| "Author of Big Sleep Succumbs to La Jolia" | 1946 | San Diego Daily Journal | Chandler interviewed |
| "Air Fare: Chandler Likes Radio IF" | July 1, 1947 | San Diego Daily Journal | Chandler interviewed by Terry Nolan |
| "The Unconventional Mr Chandler Comes to Town" | September 21, 1952 | The Sunday Times | Chandler interviewed by Cyril Ray |
| "Gentle Tough Guy" | March 6, 1953 | John O'London's Weekly | Chandler interviewed by Peter Forster |
| "Books Alive" | April 10, 1955 | Chicago Sunday Tribune | Chandler interviewed by Vincent Starrett |
| "Raymond Chandler Now Says I Confess" | April 25, 1955 | Daily Express | Chandler interviewed by René MacColl |
| "A Confession by Raymond Chandler" | January 14, 1956 | Daily Express | Chandler interviewed by Merrick Winn |
| "Raymond Chandler Talks of James Bond" | July 7, 1958 | Daily Express | Chandler interviewed by Donald Gomery |

== Novels ==
The novels of Raymond Chandler
| Title | Year of first publication | First edition publisher | Highest NYT position reached | Number of weeks on NYT list | Notes | Ref. |
|---|---|---|---|---|---|---|
| The Big Sleep | 1939 | Alfred A. Knopf, New York | — | — | Based on the short stories "Killer in the Rain" (1935) and "The Curtain" (1936). | |
| Farewell, My Lovely | 1940 | Alfred A. Knopf, New York | — | — | Based on the short stories "The Man Who Liked Dogs" (1936), "Try The Girl" (1937) and "Mandarin's Jade" (1937). | |
| The High Window | 1942 | Alfred A. Knopf, New York | — | — | First Marlowe novel to not re-use previous short stories | |
| The Lady in the Lake | 1943 | Alfred A. Knopf, New York | — | — | Based on the short stories "Bay City Blues" (1938), "The Lady In The Lake" (1939), "No Crime In The Mountains" (1941). | |
| The Little Sister | 1949 | Hamish Hamilton, London | #15 | 1 | Scenes based on the short story "Bay City Blues" (1938). | |
| The Long Good-bye | 1953 | Hamish Hamilton, London | — | — | The first edition was in the UK, where it was published as The Long Good-Bye; winner of the Edgar Award for Best Novel, 1955. Scenes based on the short story "The Curtain" (1936). | |
| Playback | 1958 | Hamish Hamilton, London | — | — | Based on an unproduced screenplay. | |
| Poodle Springs | 1989 | G. P. Putnam's Sons, New York | #9 | 4 | Unfinished novel when Chandler died; completed by American crime writer Robert B. Parker. | |

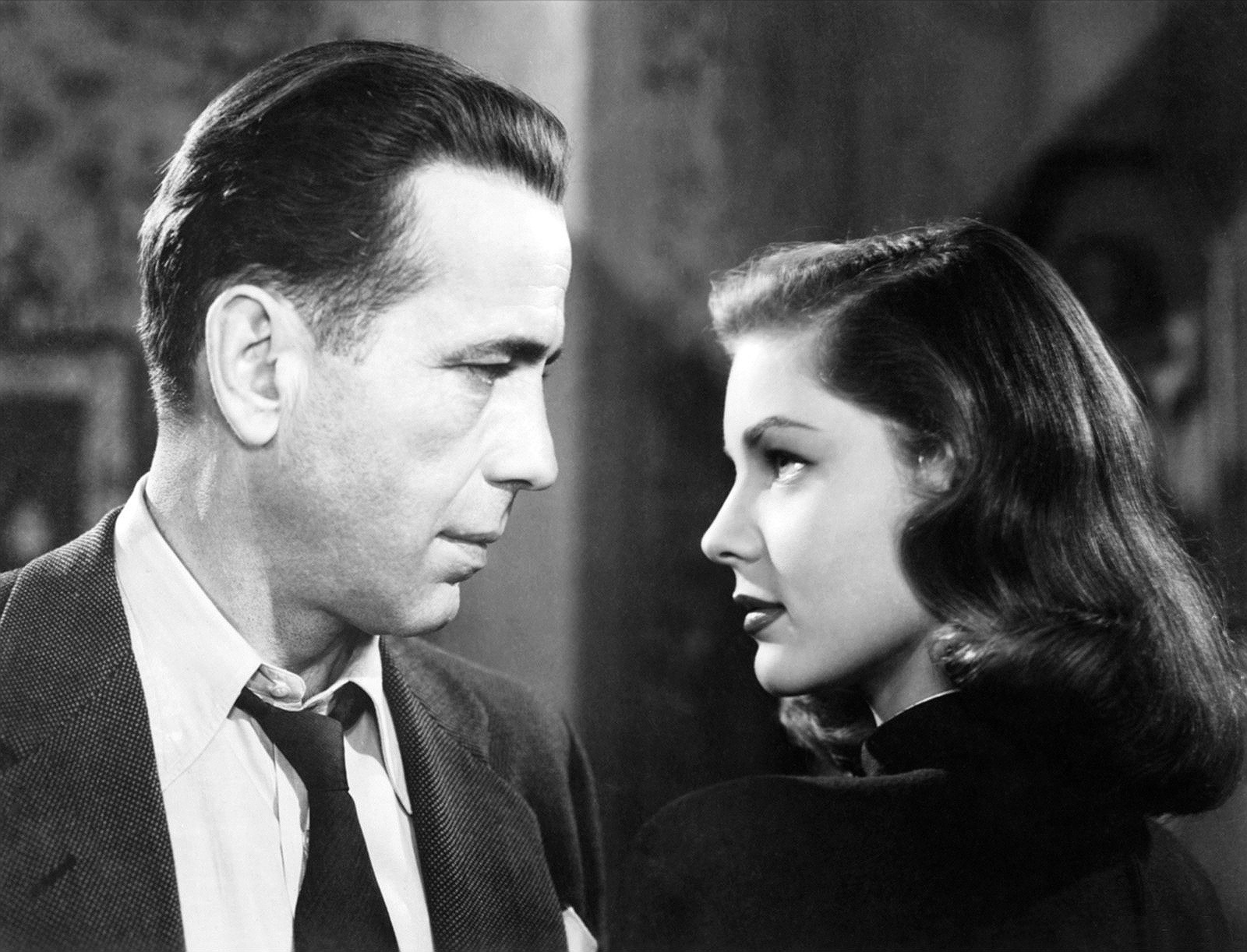
Humphrey Bogart as Philip Marlowe, with Lauren Bacall in the 1946 film The Big Sleep

Source for The New York Times Best Seller list: Figures are for the Adult Hardcover Fiction lists, 1939 and on: highest position reached and total number of weeks on list (possibly nonconsecutive). A "—" indicates it did not make the list. Note that the Times list consisted of a Top 5 and ties prior to 1945, but a Top 15 and ties afterward.

== Short story collections ==
Chandler's short story collections
| Title | Year of first publication | First edition publisher | Stories in the first edition | Ref. |
|---|---|---|---|---|
| Five Murderers | 1944 | Avon Books, New York | "Goldfish"; "Spanish Blood"; "Blackmailers Don't Shoot"; "Guns at Cyrano's"; "Nevada Gas" | |
| Five Sinister Characters | 1945 | Avon Books, New York | "Trouble Is My Business"; "Pearls Are a Nuisance"; "I'll Be Waiting"; "The King in Yellow"; "Red Wind" | |
| Red Wind | 1946 | World Publishing Co, Cleveland, OH | "Red Wind"; "Blackmailers Don't Shoot"; "I'll Be Waiting"; "Goldfish"; "Guns at Cyrano's" | |
| Spanish Blood | 1946 | World Publishing Co, Cleveland, OH | "Spanish Blood"; "The King in Yellow"; "Pearls Are a Nuisance"; "Nevada Gas"; "Trouble Is My Business" | |
| Finger Man, and Other Stories | 1947 | Avon Books, New York | "Finger Man"; "The Bronze Door"; "Smart-Aleck Kill"; "The Simple Art of Murder" | |
| The Simple Art of Murder | 1950 | Houghton Mifflin Harcourt, Boston | "Finger Man"; "Smart-Aleck Kill"; "Guns at Cyrano's"; "Pick-up on Noon Street"; "Goldfish"; "The King in Yellow"; "Pearls Are a Nuisance"; "I'll Be Waiting"; "Red Wind"; "Nevada Gas"; "Spanish Blood"; "Trouble Is My Business"; "The Simple Art of Murder" | |
| Trouble Is My Business | 1950 | Penguin Books, Harmondsworth | "Trouble Is My Business"; "Red Wind"; "I'll Be Waiting"; "Goldfish"; "Guns at Cyrano's" | |
| Pick-up on Noon Street | 1952 | Pocket Books, New York | "Pick-up on Noon Street"; "Smart-Aleck Kill"; "Guns at Cyrano's"; "Nevada Gas" | |
| Smart-Aleck Kill | 1953 | Hamish Hamilton, London | "Smart-Aleck Kill"; "Pick-up on Noon Street"; "Nevada Gas"; "Spanish Blood" | |
| Pearls Are a Nuisance | 1958 | Hamish Hamilton, London | "Pearls Are a Nuisance"; "Finger Man"; "The King in Yellow"; "The Simple Art of Murder" | |
| Killer in the Rain | 1964 | Hamish Hamilton, London | "Killer in the Rain"; "The Man Who Liked Dogs"; "The Curtain"; "Try the Girl"; "Mandarin's Jade"; "Bay City Blues"; "The Lady in the Lake"; "No Crime in the Mountains" | |
| The Smell of Fear | 1965 | Hamish Hamilton, London | "Blackmailers Don't Shoot"; "Pearls Are a Nuisance"; "Finger Man"; "The King in Yellow"; "Smart-Aleck Kill; "Pick-up on Noon Street"; "Nevada Gas"; "Spanish Blood"; "Trouble Is My Business"; "Red Wind"; "I'll Be Waiting"; "Goldfish"; "Guns at Cyrano's"; "The Pencil" | |

== Scripts ==
Many of Chandler's works were used as the basis for films. The following are where he is credited as the writer of the performed script.

Chandler's scripts
| Title | Year of release | Studio | Notes | Ref. |
|---|---|---|---|---|
| Double Indemnity | 1944 | Paramount Pictures | With Billy Wilder; based on the novella by James M. Cain. Nominated for the Academy Award for Best Adapted Screenplay | |
| And Now Tomorrow | 1944 | Paramount Pictures | With Frank Partos; based on the novel by Rachel Field. | |
| The Unseen | 1945 | Paramount Pictures | With Hagar Wilde; based on a novel by Ethel Lina White. | |
| The Blue Dahlia | 1946 | Paramount Pictures | Nominated for the Academy Award for Best Original Screenplay | |
| Strangers on a Train | 1951 | Warner Bros. | With Czenzi Ormonde; based on the novel by Patricia Highsmith. | |

Chandler's unproduced scripts
| Title | Year of release | Studio | Notes | Ref. |
|---|---|---|---|---|
| The Innocent Mrs. Duff | 1946 | Paramount Pictures | Based on The Innocent Mrs. Duff (1946) by Elisabeth Sanxay Holding | |
| Playback | 1947–48 | Universal Studios | Original story, later converted to a novel of the same name | |

== Miscellany ==
| Title | Year of first publication | First edition publisher | Category | Notes | Ref. |
|---|---|---|---|---|---|
| Raymond Chandler on Writing | 1962 | Houghton Mifflin Harcourt, Boston MA | Letters, criticism and fiction | Pamphlet containing material from Raymond Chandler Speaking published for promotional purposes; edited by Dorothy Gardiner and Kathrine Sorley Walker | |
| Raymond Chandler Speaking | 1962 | Hamish Hamilton, London | Letters, criticism and fiction | Edited by Dorothy Gardiner and Kathrine Sorley Walker | |
| Chandler before Marlowe: Raymond Chandler's Early Prose and Poetry, 1908–1912 | 1973 | University of South Carolina Press, Columbia, SC | Prose and poetry | Edited by Matthew J. Bruccoli | |
| The Notebooks of Raymond Chandler, and "English Summer: A Gothic Romance" | 1976 | Ecco Press, New York, NY | Prose and story | Edited by Frank MacShane | |
| Raymond Chandler and James M. Fox: Letters | 1979 | Privately printed | Letters, 1950-1956 | James M. Fox (né Johannes Matthijs Willem Knipscheer, 1908-1989) | |
| Selected Letters of Raymond Chandler | 1981 | Columbia University Press, New York, NY | Letters | Edited by Frank MacShane | |
| Raymond Chandler's Philip Marlowe: A Centennial Celebration | 1990 | Perigee Books, New York, NY | Stories | Contains 23 Philip Marlowe stories by various writers; also contains Chandler's "The Pencil" | |
| Raymond Chandler: Stories and Early Novels | 1995 | Library of America, New York, NY | Prose | Edited by Frank MacShane | |
| Raymond Chandler: Later Novels and Other Writings | 1995 | Library of America, New York, NY | Prose | Edited by Frank MacShane | |
| The Raymond Chandler Papers: Selected Letters and Non-Fiction, 1909–1959 | 2000 | Hamish Hamilton, London | Letters and essays | Edited by Tom Hiney and Frank MacShane | |
| The Princess and the Pedlar | 1917 / discovered 2014 | unpublished, Los Angeles | comic operetta libretto | Words by Raymond Chandler, Music by Julian Pascal | |

== References and sources ==
=== Sources ===
- Bishop, Paul (November 1984). "Raymond Chandler and the Philip Marlowe Stories". The Book and Magazine Collector (9). Diamond Publishing Group.
- Bruccoli, Matthew J. (1979). Raymond Chandler: A Descriptive Bibliography. Pittsburgh, PA: University of Pittsburgh Press. ISBN 978-0-8229-3382-3.
- Durham, Philip (1972). Introduction. Killer in the Rain. By Chandler, Raymond. New York: Ballantine Books. OCLC 21896745. OL 24211744M.
- Kabatchnik, Amnon (2012). Blood on the Stage, 1975–2000: Milestone Plays of Crime, Mystery, and Detection. Lanham, MD: The Scarecrow Press. ISBN 978-0-8108-8355-0. Archived from the original on 2016-12-02.
- McCarron, Kevin (2004). "Chandler, Raymond Thornton". Oxford Dictionary of National Biography (online ed.). Oxford University Press. doi:10.1093/ref:odnb/63651. (Subscription, Wikipedia Library access or UK public library membership required.)
- Macleod, Helen (August 1988). "Collecting UK Editions of Raymond Chandler". The Book and Magazine Collector (53). Diamond Publishing Group.
- Marling, William. "Chandler, Raymond Thornton". American National Biography Online. Oxford University Press. Archived from the original on 2016-10-26. (subscription required)
- Moss, Robert F. (2000). "Raymond Chandler". In Anderson, George; Anderson, Julie (eds.). Dictionary of Literary Biography: American Hard-Boiled Crime Writers. Detroit: Gale Research. ISBN 978-0-7876-3135-2.
- Reilly, John (1980). Twentieth Century Crime & Mystery Writers. London: Macmillan. ISBN 978-1-349-81368-1.
- Williams, Tom (2012). Raymond Chandler, a Life. London: Aurum Press. ISBN 978-1-84513-526-3.
