= Parley Baer =

American actor (1914–2002)

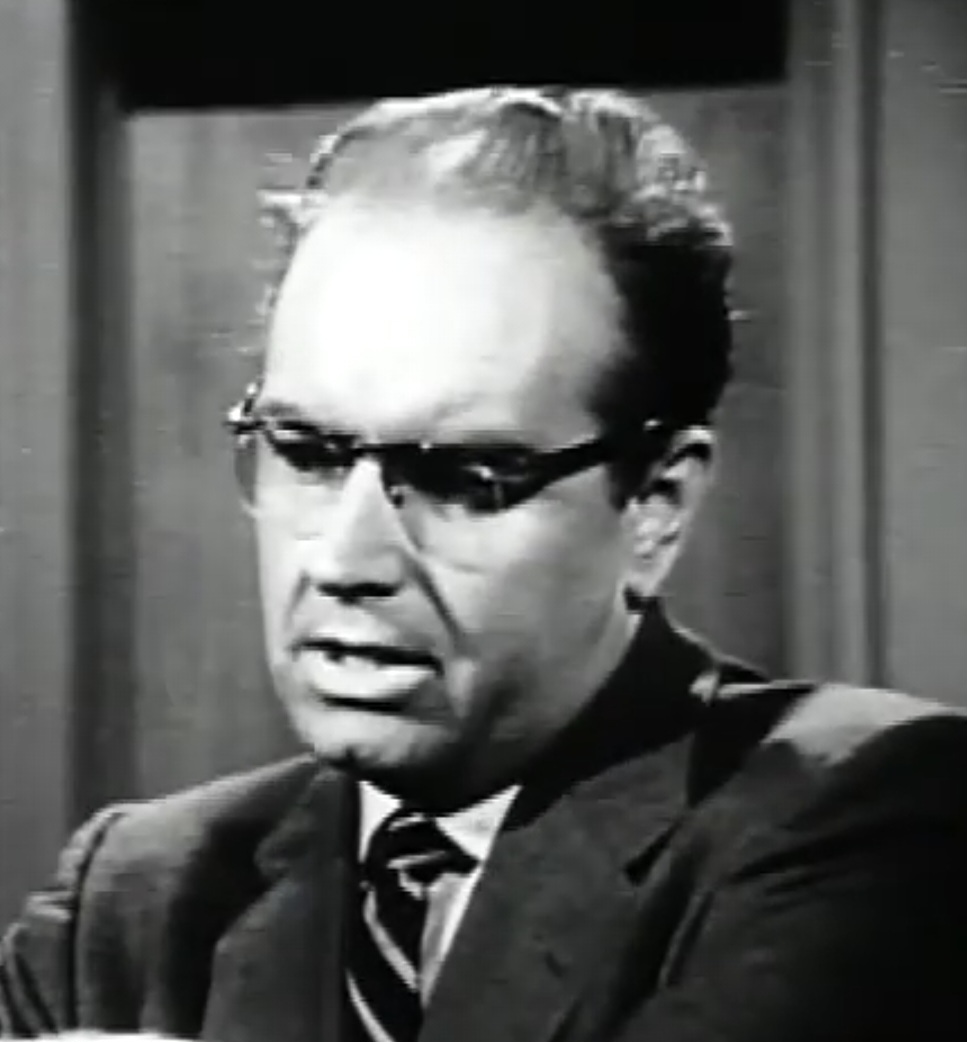
- Baer in an episode of The Public Defender (1954)
- Born: Parley Edward Baer; August 5, 1914; Salt Lake City, Utah, U.S.
- Died: November 22, 2002 (aged 88); Los Angeles, California, U.S.
- Resting place: Forest Lawn Memorial Park - Hollywood Hills Cemetery
- Occupation: Actor
- Years active: 1940–2001
- Spouse: Ernestine Clarke (m. 1946; died 2000)
- Children: 2
- Military career
- Allegiance: United States
- Branch: United States Army Air Forces
- Service years: 1942–1946
- Rank: Captain
- Conflicts: World War II: Pacific Theater
- Awards: Army Presidential Unit Citation; American Campaign Medal; Asiatic–Pacific Campaign Medal; World War II Victory Medal

Parley Edward Baer (August 5, 1914 – November 22, 2002) was an American actor in radio and later in television and film. Despite dozens of appearances in television series and theatrical films, he remains best known as the original "Chester" in the radio version of Gunsmoke, and as the Mayor of Mayberry (Roy Stoner) in The Andy Griffith Show, as well as Arthur J. Henson in The Addams Family as the Mayor, an insurance executive and as the city controller.

== Early life, family and education ==
Parley Edward Baer was born in Salt Lake City, Utah. He studied drama at the University of Utah.

Baer spent his early years working in the circus as a press agent, a manager for the American National Circus, and a ringmaster. He launched his radio career in 1933.

== Career ==
=== Circus ===
Early in his career, Baer was a circus ringmaster and publicist. He left those roles for military service in World War II. In the 1950s, he had a job training wild animals at Jungleland USA in Thousand Oaks, California. Still later, he served as a docent at the Los Angeles Zoo.

=== Military ===
Baer was commissioned as an officer in the United States Army Air Forces during World War II, attaining the rank of Captain. He served from 1942 to 1946 in the Pacific Theater, earning an Army Presidential Unit Citation, the American Campaign Medal, the Asiatic–Pacific Campaign Medal, the World War II Victory Medal and seven service stars.

=== Radio ===
Baer in the 1930s served on radio as director of special events for KSL. His first network show was The Whistler, which was soon followed by appearances on Escape (notably narrating "Wild Jack Rhett" and as the title patriot in an adaptation of Stephen Vincent Benét's "A Tooth for Paul Revere"), Suspense, Tales of the Texas Rangers (as various local sheriffs), Dragnet, The CBS Radio Workshop, Lux Radio Theater, The Six Shooter, and Yours Truly, Johnny Dollar, to name a few.

In 1952, he began playing Chester, the trusty jailhouse assistant to Marshal Matt Dillon on the radio version of Gunsmoke, eventually ad-libbing the character's full name, "Chester Wesley Proudfoot" (later changed to "Chester Goode" in the televised version of the series, which featured Dennis Weaver in the role of Chester). Baer also worked as a voice actor on several other radio shows produced by Norman MacDonnell, performing as Pete the Marshal on the situation comedy The Harold Peary Show, as Doc Clemens on Rogers of the Gazette, and as additional characters on Fort Laramie and The Adventures of Philip Marlowe.

Other recurring roles included Eb the farm hand on Granby's Green Acres (the radio predecessor to television's Green Acres, in which Baer also appeared), Gramps on The Truitts, and Rene the manservant on a radio version of The Count of Monte Cristo. His later radio work included playing Reginald Duffield and Uncle Joe Finneman on the Focus on the Family series Adventures in Odyssey in the 1980s and 1990s.

Radio playwright and director Norman Corwin cast Baer as Simon Legree in the 1969 KCET television reading of his 1938 radio play The Plot to Overthrow Christmas.

== Films and television ==
As an on-camera performer, Baer was recognizable by his distinctive voice, his paunchy appearance, and his balding head. Often he portrayed fussy, bossy, and/or obstinate officials or neighbors. Extended television roles included blustering, by-the-book Mayor Stoner on The Andy Griffith Show, the neighbor Darby on The Adventures of Ozzie and Harriet, frequent guest appearances on The Addams Family as insurance man and city commissioner Arthur J. Henson, and in the late 1990s, Miles Dugan on The Young and the Restless. He also appeared as a telephone executive on Gomer Pyle - U.S.M.C.

Baer guest-starred in the 1950s on NBC's The Dennis Day Show and It's a Great Life, on CBS's Hey, Jeannie!, on ABC's The Law and Mr. Jones with James Whitmore, on the syndicated crime drama Johnny Midnight with Edmond O'Brien, and on the NBC children's western series, Fury with Peter Graves and Bobby Diamond. He made six guest appearances on Perry Mason during the last five seasons of the CBS legal drama, including the role of Edward Farraday in the 1962 episode, "The Case of the Captain's Coins," and Willard Hupp in the 1963 episode, "The Case of the Bouncing Boomerang".

He also appeared on the ABC sitcom Harrigan and Son, on the ABC/Warner Bros. crime drama, The Roaring 20s, on NBC's crime drama Dan Raven starring Skip Homeier, and on the NBC family drama, National Velvet. Baer was cast twice on Walter Brennan's sitcom, The Real McCoys. He also guest-starred on the CBS sitcoms Dennis the Menace with Jay North, The Tom Ewell Show with Tom Ewell, and Angel, starring Annie Fargé. In the latter, he carried the lead as Dr. Mathews in the single episode "The Dentist", with Maudie Prickett as his dental secretary.

In 1961, Baer guest-starred on Marilyn Maxwell's short-lived ABC drama series, Bus Stop. On April 13, 1962, he appeared, along with Frank Ferguson and Royal Dano in ABC's crime drama Target: The Corruptors in the episode "Journey into Mourning". He was cast as hotel owner Mr. Kringelein in the 1962 film, Gypsy, opposite Natalie Wood and Rosalind Russell.

In 1963, Baer appeared with Charles Aidman and Karl Swenson in the three-part episode "Security Risk", a story of international blackmail and intrigue, on the CBS anthology series, GE True, hosted by Jack Webb.

In 1964, Baer was cast as a sheriff in an episode of Mickey Rooney's short-lived Mickey sitcom, and as a scientist in an Outer Limits episode, "Behold, Eck!" He was seen in four episodes of Hogan's Heroes and eight episodes of Bewitched in various roles as advertising clients of McMann and Tate.

Baer was cast as Horace Greeley, who came to Colorado in 1859 in the Pikes Peak Gold Rush, in the 1965 episode "The Great Turkey War" of the syndicated series, Death Valley Days.

In 1967, Baer appeared as General Whitfield on the I Dream of Jeannie episode, "Fly Me to the Moon".

Baer made two appearances on Petticoat Junction. In the 1966 episode, "Jury at the Shady Rest", he was Bailiff Tucker. Then, in the 1969 episode, "The Glen Tinker Caper", he was Judge Madison.

Later guest appearances included Three for the Road, Three's Company (as a cooking competition judge), The San Pedro Beach Bums, The A-Team, Star Trek: Voyager, The Fresh Prince of Bel-Air, The Dukes of Hazzard, Night Court, Newhart, Little House on the Prairie, The Golden Girls, Hazel, and Mad About You. He also played the role of the minister who married J. R. and Sue Ellen Ewing for their second marriage on Dallas. He also made guest appearances on F Troop.

Baer's film roles included parts in several live-action Disney features, including Follow Me, Boys! (as a mayor), The Strange Monster of Strawberry Cove (again as a mayor), The Ugly Dachshund, and Those Calloways. He also appeared in Two on a Guillotine and Dave (as the Senate majority leader). Baer had a featured role in the 1958 war drama The Young Lions, portraying a German officer and friend of Marlon Brando.

Baer was especially proud of his brief appearance in the film, White Dog, a powerful story about racism. Baer plays a character seen at first as a kindly grandfather, only to reveal himself as a hateful bigot who has trained the title character to attack black skin. Baer remarked, "Often racism, like true evil, presents itself with a smile and a handshake".

Some ten years earlier, Baer played a closet racist in a Christmas episode of Bewitched. The episode "Sisters at Heart" aired on ABC on December 24, 1970, in which he played the role of Mr. Brockway, the owner of a toy-manufacturing firm.

== Commercials ==
Baer voiced Ernie Keebler in the cookie commercials before he suffered a stroke in 1997 which affected both speech and movement. He recovered sufficiently to make a handful of appearances at old-time radio conventions in his later years. In the 1980s he dressed in old-time garb as "Mr. S", one of the company founders, in commercials for S&W Fine Foods.

== Personal life and death ==
In 1946, Baer met and married circus aerialist and bareback rider Elizabeth Ernestine Clarke. They were together for 54 years until her death on August 5, 2000, in Tarzana, California.

In 1969, Baer gave the eulogy at the funeral of The Andy Griffith Show castmate Howard McNear. McNear had portrayed Mayberry's Floyd the Barber and Baer had played Mayor Roy Stoner. McNear also portrayed Doc Adams in the radio version of Gunsmoke, often interacting with Baer's character, Chester Proudfoot.

On November 11, 2002, following another stroke, Baer was taken to the Motion Picture & Television Country House and Hospital. Eleven days later, at the age of 88, he died there.

== Filmography ==
- The Kid from Texas (1950) as Off-Screen Narrator (voice, uncredited)
- Comanche Territory (1950) as Boozer, the Bartender
- Union Station (1950) as Detective Gottschalk
- The Company She Keeps (1951) as Steve (uncredited)
- Three Guys Named Mike (1951) as Bakery Truck Driver (uncredited)
- Air Cadet (1951) as Major Jim Evans
- The Fat Man (1951) as Police Detective O'Halloran (uncredited)
- The Frogmen (1951) as Dr. Ullman (uncredited)
- People Will Talk (1951) as Toy Store Salesman (uncredited)
- Elopement (1952) as Dr. Henry (uncredited)
- Red Skies of Montana (1952) as Dr. Henry (uncredited)
- The Dennis Day Show (1952, TV Series)
- Deadline – U.S.A. (1952) as Headwaiter (uncredited)
- Fearless Fagan (1952) as Emil Tauchnitz
- Something for the Birds (1952) as Refrigerator Deliveryman (uncredited)
- Dragnet (1952, TV Series) as Father on Phone / District Attorney
- Pickup on South Street (1953) as Headquarters Communist in Chair (uncredited)
- Vicki (1953) as 2nd Detective (uncredited)
- The Gambler from Natchez (1954) as Riverboat Captain (uncredited)
- The George Burns and Gracie Allen Show (1954, TV Series) as Detective Sharkey
- The Loretta Young Show (1954, TV Series) as Mr. Banner
- Father Knows Best (1955, TV Series) as Lyle
- The Bob Cummings Show (1955, TV Series) as Wester
- Our Miss Brooks (1952-1955, TV Series) as Mr Maynard / Mr Chambers / Bennett
- Alfred Hitchcock Presents (1956, TV Series) (Season 1 Episode 27: "Help Wanted") as Police Detective Gryar
- D-Day the Sixth of June (1956) as Sgt. Gerbert (uncredited)
- Away All Boats (1956) as Dr. Gates
- December Bride (1956, TV Series)
- Drango (1957) as George Randolph
- I Love Lucy (1955-1957, TV Series) as Mr. Perry / Mr. Reilly
- Jane Wyman Presents The Fireside Theatre (1956-1957, TV Series) as Enos Finney / Mr. Fitch / Fitch
- Official Detective (1958, TV Series) as Sam Goodwin
- The Young Lions (1958) as Sergeant Brandt
- Paul Bunyan (1958) as Chris Crosshaul
- The FBI Story (1959) as Harry Dakins
- Westinghouse Desilu Playhouse (1959, TV Series) as Gaunt
- Zane Grey Theater (1956-1959, TV Series) as Frank Lloyd / Clem Doud / Mayor Homer Bellam / Dan Morriss
- Cash McCall (1960) as Harvey Bannon
- Wake Me When It's Over (1960) as Col. Archie Hollingsworth
- The Adventures of Huckleberry Finn (1960) as Grangeford Man
- Make Room for Daddy (1956-1960, TV Series) as Mr. Denton, Postal Inspector / Mr. Kendall / Mr. Haynes
- The Real McCoys (1958-1960, TV Series) as Mr. Venable / Mr. Saunders
- The Rifleman (1959-1961, TV Series) as Neff Packer / Walter Mathers
- Dennis the Menace (1959-1962, TV Series) as Mr. Pindyck / Capt. Blast
- The Tom Ewell Show (1960, TV Series) as Mayor Bradford
- A Fever in the Blood (1961) as Charles 'Charlie' Bosworth
- The Dick Powell Theatre (1962, TV Series) as Lieutenant Hockberg
- General Electric Theater (1954-1962, TV Series) as Harvey Seymour / Mayor Douglas / Haveman
- Bachelor Father (1962, TV Series) as Dr. Whittaker
- The Spiral Road (1962) as Mr. Boosmans
- Have Gun - Will Travel (1959-1962, TV Series) as Reston - Townsman / Sam Thurber / John Ellsworth (ironically playing a character whose death was connected to a traveling circus schedule)
- Laramie (1962, TV Series) as Fred McAllen
- Gypsy (1962) as Mr. Kringelein
- The Andy Griffith Show (1962-1963, TV Series) as Mayor Roy Stoner
- Rawhide (1963, TV Series) as Bryant / Dinny
- Dr. Kildare (1963, TV Series) as Dr. James Connors
- Wagon Train (1962-1963, TV Series) as George Talley / John Maitland / Clyde Montgomery
- 77 Sunset Strip (1964, TV Series) as Charlie Cornwall
- The Jack Benny Program (1964, TV Series) as Charlie Cornwall
- The Brass Bottle (1964) as Samuel Wackerbath
- Bedtime Story (1964) as Colonel Williams
- The Outer Limits (1964, TV Series) as Dr. Bernard Stone
- Bob Hope Presents the Chrysler Theatre (1964, TV Series) as Leonard F. Bellack
- The Joey Bishop Show (1964, TV Series) as Judge
- Two on a Guillotine (1965) as 'Buzz' Sheridan
- Those Calloways (1965) as Doane Shattuck
- Hazel (1965, TV Series) as Mr. Rowland
- Bus Riley's Back in Town (1965) as Jules Griswald
- Fluffy (1965) as Police Captain
- The Money Trap (1965) as Banker (scenes deleted)
- Marriage on the Rocks (1965) as Dr. Newman (uncredited)
- My Favorite Martian (1965, TV Series) as Mr. Babcock
- Death Valley Days (1963-1965, TV Series) as Horace Greeley / Sager / Dr. Simon / Crowder
- The Adventures of Ozzie & Harriet (TV Series) (1953-1965, TV Series) as Herb Darby / Attorney Hopkins
- F Troop (1965, TV Series) as Colonel Watkins
- Burke's Law (1965, TV Series) as Colonel Pavlov Popoff
- The Farmer's Daughter (1965-1966, TV Series) as Mr. Rapp / Otto Olsen
- The Ugly Dachshund (1966) as Mel Chadwick
- Bonanza (1961-1966, TV Series) as Harry Crawford / Frank Armstead / Jack Cunningham
- The Addams Family (1965-1966, TV Series) as Mayor Arthur J. Henson
- Perry Mason (1961-1966, TV Series) as Frank Cummings / Ian Jarvis / Willard Hupp / David Bickel / Edward Farraday / Seward Quentin
- Follow Me, Boys! (1966) as Mayor
- The Fugitive (1964-1967, TV Series) as Al Cooney / Lee Burroughs
- The Adventures of Bullwhip Griffin (1967) as Chief Executioner
- The Phyllis Diller Show (1966-1967, TV Series) as Morgan / Derwin
- Rango (1967, TV Series) as Wilkins
- Laredo (1967, TV Series) as Alcott Willingham
- The Gnome-Mobile (1967) as The Owl (voice, uncredited)
- I Dream of Jeannie (1967, TV Series) as General Whiston
- Gomer Pyle, U.S.M.C. (1966-1967, TV Series) as Judson Travers / Mr. Corbett
- The Lucy Show (1962-1967, TV Series) as Dr. Davis / Colonel Dietrich / Judge / Mr. Evans
- Lassie (1968, TV Series) as Austin Redmond / Austin Richmond
- Day of the Evil Gun (1968) as Willford
- Counterpoint (1968) as Hook
- Judd for the Defense (1968, TV Series) as Magistrate
- Where Were You When the Lights Went Out? (1968) as Dr. Dudley Caldwell
- Ironside (1968, TV Series) as Everett Brandt / Commander Stevens
- The Name of the Game (1969, TV Series) as Doctor
- Land of the Giants (1969, TV Series) as Senator Obek
- Young Billy Young (1969) as Bell
- The Doris Day Show (1969, TV Series) as Mr. Thornby
- Hogan's Heroes (1965-1969, TV Series) as Julius Schlager / Doctor Pohlmann / Colonel Burmeister / Professor Altman
- Mannix (1970, TV Series) as Archie
- Petticoat Junction (1965-1970, TV Series) as Mr. Bellingham / Judge Madison / Judge Turner / Bailiff Vince Tucker / Henry Phillips
- The F.B.I. (1965-1970, TV Series) as Newman / Vernon Daniels / Jake Jason
- The Bill Cosby Show (1970, TV Series) as Mr. Tyler
- The Virginian (1962-1970, TV Series) as Henderson / Judge Jeremiah Pitt / Pat Magill / The Senator
- Green Acres (1965-1971, TV Series) as Lieutenant Governor / Mister Peterson / Mr. Treffinger / Mr. Webster
- Skin Game (1971) as Mr. Claggart
- The Strange Monster of Strawberry Cove (1971) as Mayor George Hathaway
- Mod Squad (1971, TV Series) as Koger
- Walt Disney's Wonderful World of Color (1959-1971, TV Series) as Mayor Hancock
- Here's Lucy (1971, TV Series) as Dr. Cunningham
- Bewitched (1966-1972, TV Series) as Walter Franklin / Mr. Burkeholder / Mr. Brockway / Desk Sergeant / Mr. Nickerson / Bigelow / Dr. Matthew Kramer / James Dennis Robinson
- Medical Center (1971-1973, TV Series) as Farraday / Dr. Fred Elter
- Kung Fu (1973, TV Series) as Dr. Gormley
- Sixteen (1973) as The Reverend
- The Streets of San Francisco (1976, TV Series) as Jack Leopold
- The Amazing Dobermans (1976) as Septimus, Circus Owner
- The Hardy Boys/Nancy Drew Mysteries (1977, TV Series) as Doc Wilson
- Charlie's Angels (1978-1979, TV Series) as Grandpa / Captain Jack McGuire
- The Incredible Hulk (1979, TV Series) as Raymond Harmell
- B.J. and the Bear (1980, TV Series) as Mayor
- Little House on the Prairie (1976-1980, TV Series) as Mr. Williams / J.W. Diamond
- WKRP in Cincinnati (1980, TV Series) as Mr. Armor
- Knots Landing (1981, TV Series) as Old Man
- Carbon Copy (1981) as Dr. Bristol
- An Ozzie and Harriet Christmas (1981, TV special on KTLA in Los Angeles) as self
- Hart to Hart (1982, TV Series) as Constantine Wainwright
- Lou Grant (1979-1982, TV Series) as Ray Elders / Carlton Stiefel / Haggerty / Sheriff Burkhardt
- White Dog (1982) as Wilber Hull
- Father Murphy (1982, TV Series) as Banker
- Dallas (1982, TV Series) as Minister Brown
- Archie Bunker's Place (1983, TV Series) as Judge Anthony Barzini
- Doctor Detroit (1983) as Judge
- Three's Company (1983, TV Series) as Bert Landers
- The A-Team (1984, TV Series) as Max Klein
- Chattanooga Choo Choo (1984) as Alonzo Dillard
- The Dukes of Hazzard (1981-1984, TV Series) as Doc Appleby
- Pray for Death (1985) as Sam Green
- Simon & Simon (1986, TV Series) as Tourist Husband
- Flag (1986)
- Newhart (1984-1987, TV Series) as Buck
- The Golden Girls (1987, TV Series) as Chester T. Rainey
- Night Court (1988, TV Series) as Judge Sims
- License to Drive (1988) as Grandpa Anderson
- Time Trackers (1989) as Lucius
- Growing Pains (1989, TV Series) as Counterman
- Almost an Angel (1990) as George Bealeman
- Beverly Hills, 90210 (1991, TV Series) as Al Brown
- Quantum Leap (1991-1992, TV Series) as Judge Shiner / Dr. Rogers
- Space Case (1992) as Bitby
- Mad About You (1993, TV Series) as The Husband
- The Fresh Prince of Bel-Air (1993, TV Series) as Woodrow
- Dave (1993) as Senate Majority Leader
- King B: A Life in the Movies (1993) as Walter Dent
- The Young and the Restless (1993-1996, TV Series) as Miles Dugan
- L.A. Law (1990-1994, TV Series) as Supreme Court Judge Parker
- Roswell (1994) as Civilian Advisor
- Renegade (1994) as Wesley
- Last of the Dogmen (1995) as Mr. Hollis
- Coach (1995, TV Series) as Frank
- Star Trek: Voyager (1996, TV Series) as Old Man #1

== Listen to ==
- Interview with Parley Baer (following Dick Tracy episode)

== Bibliography ==
- Metz, Walter (2007). Bewitched. Wayne State University Press. ISBN 978-0-8143-3580-2.
- Pilato, Herbie J. (2001). Bewitched Forever: The Immortal Companion to Television's Most Magical Supernatural Situation Comedy (2nd ed.). The Summit Publishing Group. ISBN 978-1-930819-07-8.
