= Killer in the Rain =

Book by Raymond Chandler

- First edition cover
- Author: Raymond Chandler
- Language: English
- Genre: Crime short stories
- Publisher: Hamish Hamilton (UK)
- Publication date: 1964
- Publication place: United States
- Media type: Print (hardback)
- Pages: 332 pp

Killer in the Rain is a collection of short stories, including the eponymous title story, written by hard-boiled detective fiction author Raymond Chandler. The collection features eight short stories originally published in pulp magazines between 1935 and 1941.

At Chandler's request, the stories remained uncollected during his lifetime and, save for three which were reprinted without his express permission, were not republished until 1964.

== Contents ==
The collection features eight stories, all but the last predating Chandler's first novel The Big Sleep. They are, with place of original publication:

- "Killer in the Rain" (Black Mask, January 1935)
- "The Man Who Liked Dogs" (Black Mask, March 1936)
- "The Curtain" (Black Mask, September 1936)
- "Try the Girl" (Black Mask, January 1937)
- "Mandarin's Jade" (Dime Detective Magazine, November 1937)
- "Bay City Blues" (Dime Detective Magazine, November 1937)
- "The Lady in the Lake" (Dime Detective Magazine, January 1939)
- "No Crime in the Mountains" (Detective Story Magazine, September 1941)

== Cannibalization ==
During his lifetime, it was Chandler's personal desire that the stories not be reprinted. This was because he felt that the plots had become cannibalized — in the process of writing three of his novels, Chandler had borrowed, expanded, and extensively reworked plots, passages, and characters from these eight stories. The Big Sleep made use of "The Curtain", "Killer in the Rain", as well as small passages from "Finger Man". Farewell, My Lovely made use of "The Man Who Liked Dogs", "Try the Girl" and "Mandarin's Jade". The Lady in the Lake made use of the short story of the same name, "Bay City Blues" and "No Crime in the Mountains". The opening passage of "The Curtain" would also be revised and reused for the same function in his sixth novel, The Long Goodbye.
