= List of The George Burns and Gracie Allen Show episodes =

This article lists the episodes of The George Burns and Gracie Allen Show, an American situation comedy television series that ran for eight seasons (1950–58) on CBS. The show did not become weekly until the third season. The first two seasons of the show were biweekly broadcasts, with the last episode of Season Two broadcast three weeks after the one that preceded it.

== Series overview ==
Season	Episodes	Originally released	
Season	Episodes	First released	Last released
1	26	October 12, 1950	September 13, 1951
2	26	September 27, 1951	September 25, 1952
3	40	October 9, 1952	August 17, 1953
4	40	October 5, 1953	August 23, 1954
5	40	October 4, 1954	July 4, 1955
6	40	October 3, 1955	September 24, 1956
7	40	October 1, 1956	July 1, 1957
8	39	September 30, 1957	September 15, 1958

== Episodes ==
There were 291 episodes over 8 seasons.

=== Season 1 (1950–51) ===
No. overall	No. in season	Title	Directed by	Written by	Original release date
1	1	"The Kleebob Card Game"	Ralph Levy	Sid Dorfman, Harvey Helm, Paul Henning, William Burns	October 12, 1950
George Burns stands in front of the curtain and introduces his new television show to the audience. The curtains pull back and we meet Gracie. She's trimming the hedge in her window box with an electric razor. George then introduces his neighbors, the Mortons and his announcer Bill Goodwin. A door-to-door book salesman named Charles Jones (Henry Jones) finds Gracie to be a tough customer. The Skylarks then perform a song. George then tries to sing a song with them. Gracie and Blanche Morton (Bea Benaderet) want to go to the movies. George and Harry want to go to the fights. George and Bill do a skit about Bill running out of gas in his small plane. George and Harry try to get out of going to the movies by teaching their wives a confusing card game they invented called "Kleebob." Gracie sees through their plan and they wind up going to the movies. Note: Hal March appears as Harry Morton in the first 7 episodes.
2	2	"Gracie the Artist"	Ralph Levy	Paul Henning, Sid Dorfman, Harvey Helm, William (Willy) Burns	October 26, 1950
After briefly discussing reaction to the first Burns and Allen telecast, George steps aside as Gracie visits an art museum. When Gracie learns how much some of the artwork costs, she immediately decides that she will become a painter. Choreographer Bob Fosse and his dance partner/wife Mary Ann Niles perform. George and Gracie then perform a dance and joke skit. Blanche and Harry Morton discuss Gracie taking up painting. George and Bill Goodwin watch Gracie mix paint with an egg beater. Bill does a plug for Carnation Milk. Gracie paints a picture of George. George, Harry and Blanche think it looks like a yellow cab, which causes Gracie to start crying. She's actually crying because, to be a great artist one must suffer, and Gracie is wearing shoes two sizes small.
3	3	"The Property Tax Assessor"	Ralph Levy	Paul Henning, Sid Dorfman, Harvey Helm, William (Willy) Burns	November 9, 1950
George delivers a monologue on how he met Gracie. A Tax Assessor (Bob Sweeney) comes by to appraise the Burnses' furniture. Gracie proceeds to confuse the assessor. Blanche tells Harry that George and Gracie will be joining them at the football game later. Harry is not thrilled as Gracie knows nothing about football. Gracie stops by the Morton's house. The Tax Assessor comes by the Morton house. When Gracie answers the door, he runs off. Singer Ellen Hanley performs. Gracie is concerned that George will discover a dent in the car that she thinks she put there. She wants Bill Goodwin to borrow the car and have it repaired. George and Gracie do a routine about the doctor's office. Bill comes by and gives George a story about how his car was in an accident and that's why he wants to borrow George's. George doesn't lend him the car. The Morton's come by to pick up George and Gracie for the game. George tells Gracie he put the dent in the car.
4	4	"Harry Morton's Private Secretary"	Ralph Levy	Paul Henning, Sid Dorfman, Harvey Helm, William (Willy) Burns	November 23, 1950
George does a monologue about some of his earlier acts. Blanche becomes jealous when Harry hires a new secretary because she assumes she will be very pretty. Harry tells Blanche that his new secretary is a man and an old fraternity brother of his. Blanche is not sure she believes Harry. Harry says he will have him come by and meet her and the Burnses. Harrison Muller performs a tap dance routine. George then pretends to have a dance off with Harrison. George does a dance with Harrison and Choreographer Bob Fosse. Harry calls George and says he will be bringing his secretary along for dinner. A pretty high school student named Geraldine Bojus drops by the Burns home to interview George for her high school newspaper. Harry and Blanche arrive with Jim Benson, the secretary. Gracie briefly thinks Geraldine is the secretary until she is introduced to Jim. George wants to sing a song, but Gracie says it's time for dinner.
5	5	"Gracie's Checking Account"	Ralph Levy	Paul Henning, Sid Dorfman, Harvey Helm, William (Willy) Burns	December 7, 1950
George delivers a monologue about whether Gracie has ever said or done anything sensible in her entire lifetime. While waiting for Blanche at the Morton house, Gracie watches Harry sign some papers, much to his distraction. Gracie tells Harry that she is going to return George's Christmas gifts to save him the trouble of returning them after Christmas. When Gracie leaves, she inadvertently takes Harry's real estate listings with her. Chester Vanderlip, the banker, comes by to see George. Chester asks George to keep Gracie out of his bank. Chester has an issue with Gracie's method of writing checks and balancing her account. George has to figure out how he will tell Gracie that he's closing her account. Meanwhile, a traffic cop tries to give Gracie a ticket for speeding and running red lights. But, after talking to Gracie for awhile, he decides to just leave. Gracie and George discuss her experience in the gift exchange line. Gracie tells George that she wants him to close her checking account as she thinks the bank is dishonest.
6	6	"Gracie's Christmas"	Unknown	Paul Henning, Harvey Helm	December 21, 1950
Gracie reminisces about the Christmas celebrations of her youth.
7	7	"Rumba Lessons"	Ralph Levy	Paul Henning, Sid Dorfman, Harvey Helm, William (Willy) Burns	December 28, 1950
George does a monologue about a guy that has no talent, but wants to get on TV. Gracie and Blanche come back from the beauty parlor and discuss the women there. They also talk about the upcoming party at the Vanderlip's and how Harry and George can't rumba. Gracie wants to borrow the car, but George reminds her that she hasn't renewed her license. Harry tries to hide his weeks pay from Blanche, but that doesn't work. Gracie tells Blanche that she is going to hire an Arthur Murray dance instructor to teach George and Harry how to dance. Bill Goodwin comes by with his new small English car. He's in a hurry to get to a lunch with a producer, but manages to talk about Carnation Milk. George and Harry use the excuse of "old football injuries" to not have to take the dance lessons. But then they see the beautiful female from Arthur Murray, who they believe will be their dance instructor. Turns out she is only the assistant who plays the records and it is an elderly gentleman that is their teacher. They take the dance lessons anyway.
8	8	"Happy Hmm Hmm"	Unknown	Harvey Helm	January 4, 1951
George does a monologue about questions he gets about other celebrities. Gracie discovers that today's date is circled on her calendar, but she doesn't remember why. She tells George it's Happy Hmm Hmm, but he doesn't know what she means. Gracie decides to go out and get a cake. Trying to find out what's special about today, George speaks to Miller the Baker (Frank Jaquet). Miller tells him that Gracie had Happy Hmm Hmm put on the cake. Meanwhile, Bill Goodwin tells George he got a part in a picture. Gracie invites him to the party that night. Harry asks George to hide some money for him so Blanche doesn't get it. Harry and Blanche arrive for the party and Gracie gives Blanche the hidden money she found. More people start to arrive. Jack Benny comes by and says they were supposed to be at a party at Jack's house this evening. Note: This is the first appearance of John Brown as Harry Morton. Hal March had just gone to New York to do his own show with his partner Bob Sweeney.
9	9	"To Go or Not to Go"	Unknown	Harvey Helm	January 18, 1951
George and Harry Morton want to go duck hunting, but Gracie and Blanche want to go to Palm Springs.
10	10	"Gracie and the St. Bernard"	Ralph Levy	Harvey Helm	February 1, 1951
Gracie finds a stray St. Bernard dog so she brings him home. She tries to teach him tricks, such as how to fetch George's golf clubs which displeases George.
11	11	"Holding Out"	Unknown	Harvey Helm	February 15, 1951
When Blanche discovers that Harry has been holding out money from his paycheck to go to the racetrack, she leaves him and stays with the Burnses.
12	12	"The Income Tax Man"	Ralph Levy	Paul Henning, Sid Dorfman, Harvey Helm, William (Willy) Burns	March 1, 1951
George does a monologue about some of the things involved in making a TV show. Ralph Hanley (Joseph Kearns), the accountant, comes by to talk to Gracie about her income taxes. Gracie wants to know why we can't list our politicians as dependents, seeing that we pay their salaries. She has some more confusing questions for Ralph. Harry Morton (John Brown) drops by and asks Gracie what he should get Blanche for her birthday. Mr. Miller the Baker asks George if he would appear at his club's banquet. George tries to explain community property to Gracie. Bill Goodwin volunteers to MC the banquet. Gracie continues to confuse Mr. Hanley. Gracie tells Blanche what Harry is getting for her birthday. An exhausted Mr. Hanley completes the tax return.
13	13	"The Vanderlips' Dinner Party"	Ralph Levy	Harvey Helm	March 15, 1951
The Vanderlips are having a dinner party, but have not invited Blanche and Harry. Note: Ronnie Burns and his sister Sandra Burns plays themselves. Their first appearance on the show.
14	14	"Johnny Velvet's Day in Court"	Ralph Levy	Paul Henning, Sid Dorfman, Harvey Helm, William (Willy) Burns	March 29, 1951
George does a monologue about a fashion show Gracie made him go to and different fashions. Gracie tells Blanche that she has to go to court today as she was a witness to an accident. Mr. Bridges and Mr. Hightower (Shepard Menken) arrive at Gracie's house. They are lawyers for gangster Johnny Velvet (Sheldon Leonard), who was involved in the accident. They hope to have Gracie testify in favor of Velvet, but after a confusing conversation, they try to get Gracie to not show up to court. Velvet comes to the house and tells Gracie she better not show up. He then tells George to keep Gracie away from the court or they'll find George in the river. Bill Goodwin talks to Velvet about Carnation Milk. Later, Gracie tells George what happened in court and how she kept interrupting the Judge. Velvet and his two lawyers show up. Velvet tells George that the Judge ordered them to spend 24 hours with Gracie.
15	15	"George is Sick"	Unknown	Harvey Helm	April 12, 1951
George is sick. People keep bringing him food to help him gain strength and recover.
16	16	"Teenage Girl Spends the Weekend"	Ralph Levy	Paul Henning, Sid Dorfman, Harvey Helm, William (Willy) Burns	April 26, 1951
George does a monologue about him not being a handyman around the house and hiring repair people. Gracie and Blanche talk about how Gracie makes up a laundrey list after the clothes come back. Gracie tells Blanche that the Vanderlips are going out of town for a few days. Their 17 year old daughter Emily is going to stay with her and George for the weekend. George tries to break up a fight between Blanche and Harry, but winds up with them yelling at him. Emily arrives at the house. Emily tries to explain her homework to Gracie, but Gracie just makes things more confusing. Bill Goodwin shows Emily how to impress her boyfriend Chuck with Carnation Evaporated Milk. Chuck comes by to pick up Emily for their date. The two show George and Gracie the type of dancing they will be doing later. After they leave, George and Gracie do a dance of their own.
17	17	"The Andersons Move In"	Ralph Levy	Harvey Helm	May 10, 1951
Harry Morton sells a lot in the neighborhood to some out-of-state people.
18	18	"The Vanderlips' Costume Party"	Ralph Levy	Harvey Helm	May 24, 1951
The Vanderlips plan to throw a lavish costume party. Gracie goes to a travel agency to look at brochures to get some ideas for costumes for her and George. Note: Veteran American actor Fred Clark assumes the role of Harry Morton and remained in the role through the 1953 end of Season 3.
19	19	"Mamie Kelly Gets Stuck"	Ralph Levy	Paul Henning, Sid Dorfman, Harvey Helm, William (Willy) Burns	June 7, 1951
Gracie's friend Mamie Kelly (Sarah Selby) comes for a short visit, but has already stayed two weeks. Mamie is supposed to leave today. George does a monologue about unwanted house guests. Gracie takes Mamie to the airport. Bill Goodwin comes by and tells George about a movie he's going to be in. Mamie misses the plane. George tells Bill that he will get him a better part if he makes sure Mamie gets to the train. Harry Morton just sold some property and Blanche wants him to buy her a mink with the commission. George comes over to the Morton's for lunch. But George doesn't get to eat because Harry thinks the food isn't good enough for him. Mamie misses the train. George says he will take Mamie to the bus himself. George comes home after getting Mamie on the bus. Mamie's husband Charley (Stephen Chase) and his three daughters arrive. Gracie says she'll wire Mamie and have her come back. Melinda Casey appears as Linda Kelly.
20	20	"To Fish or Not to Fish"	Unknown	Harvey Helm	June 21, 1951
Harry Morton would rather go fishing than visit Blanche's mother.
21	21	"Too Much of the Mortons"	Ralph Levy	Paul Henning, Sid Dorfman, Harvey Helm, William (Willy) Burns	July 5, 1951
George thinks he and Gracie are spending too much time with the Morton's. He thinks they should make some new friends. George does a monologue about friends seeing too much of each other. Mr. Norman (Herb Vigran), from the Pest Control Service, comes by for a termite inspection. He has the usual confusing conversation with Gracie. Harry Morton tells George about a deal he has to plant Christmas trees in Texas. Harry doesn't want to go to the beach with Gracie and George. He says let them go to the beach and they'll use George's pool. Bobby the grocery boy (Marc Cavell) drops by. Gracie talks to him about what he'll be when he grows up. Bill Goodwin believes that George thinks he's a pest. When George finds out the Morton's are also going to the beach, he suggests letting them go and he and Gracie stay at home. After both couples try to trick each other again, they go to the beach together.
22	22	"Silky Thompson Moves to Beverly Hills"	Unknown	Harvey Helm	July 19, 1951
A petition is circulated to prevent gangster Silky Thompson from moving into George and Gracie's neighborhood. After spending some time with Gracie, Thompson signs it himself. Note: Guest star Sheldon Leonard returns, this time as gangster Silky Thompson.
23	23	"Gracie's Vegetarian Plot"	Ralph Levy	Paul Henning, Sid Dorfman, Harvey Helm, William (Willy) Burns	August 2, 1951
Gracie and Blanche read a vegetarian diet book by author Professor Hayward Bradford (Alan Mowbray). Gracie says that she invited Professor Bradford to speak at the meeting of their club, the Beverly Hills Uplifters Society. George does a monologue about women following the latest styles. Bobby, the grocery boy, drops off a bunch of vegetables. Professor Bradford stops by the house to discuss his lecture. He has a very confusing conversation with Gracie. Harry comes back from playing golf and is ready for lunch. Blanche serves him a plate of raw vegetables. Bill Goodwin brings by some Carnation cookbooks for Gracie to sign. George and Harry think that Bill actually brought some food with him. Gracie tells George about her trip to the zoo. George tells Harry he bought two steaks and put them in Harry's refrigerator. They go over to Harry's house, not knowing that Blanche found the steaks and cooked them for her and Gracie. Note: Bill Goodwin's last episode as the show's announcer.
24	24	"Space Patrol Kids Visit"	Ralph Levy	Paul Henning, Sid Dorfman, Harvey Helm, William (Willy) Burns	August 16, 1951
Mamie Kelley and her children come for a visit. She parks her trailor in the yard. The three girls are dressed as Space Patrol cadets and shoot Harry Morton with their toy blasters. George is trying to write a speech when the girls shoot him. Mamie tells Gracie that she wants to move into this town. George does a monologue about the things kids play with today. Gracie talks to Mortimer Douglas (Pierre Watkin), the local Principal, about the girls attending his school. Harry and Blanche interrupt George's speech writing. George jumps into the pool after one of the girls jumps in. Gracie tries not to, but winds up disturbing George's speech writing. George finally puts on one of the girls space helmet so he can't hear anything and writes his speech. Jill St. John appears as Sherry Kelly. Note: Harry Von Zell's first episode as the show's announcer.
25	25	"Buying Wholesale"	Unknown	Harvey Helm	August 30, 1951
Harry Morton has a real-estate client who sells appliances. Harry tells Gracie that she can order things through him wholesale. George makes her take the appliances back, so she buys the same items-retail. Note: Identical plot to Season 4, Episode 38 "Gracie Buys a Toaster Wholesale".
26	26	"Gracie Gives a Wedding"	Ralph Levy	Paul Henning, Sid Dorfman, Harvey Helm, William (Willy) Burns	September 13, 1951
Gracie tells Blanche that she has offered to host a wedding for Mrs. Nelson's daughter Carol to repay the bride's mother for a tremendous favor. George does a monologue about weddings and their costs. George is willing to fund the wedding even though he doesn't know the people. Monsieur Robert (Maurice Marsac) of the catering company comes by. He has a confusing discussion with Gracie about the menu. Blanche tells Harry that he will be best man at the wedding even though he doesn't know the people. George stops the action (literally) to explain that Bill Goodwin had gone to New York to star in his own TV show. Stephen Dunne does a commercial for Carnation. Harry von Zell joins the commercial. George meets Mr. and Mrs. Nelson and they thank him for everything he is doing for Carol. As the wedding starts, George finds out what the tremendous favor was that Mr. Nelson did for Gracie. It turns out that when Gracie's car stalled a couple weeks ago, Mrs. Nelson gave her a little push. Shepard Menken appears as Pierre. Note: This story line was used again in season 5's "Gracie Gives a Wedding in Payment of a Favor"

=== Season 2 (1951–52) ===
No. overall	No. in season	Title	Directed by	Written by	Original release date
27	1	"Gracie Goes to a Psychiatrist"	Ralph Levy	Paul Henning, Sid Dorfman, Harvey Helm, William (Willy) Burns	September 27, 1951
Blanche is worried after having the same bad dream five nights in a row. She made an appointment with a psychiatrist, but then chickens out. Gracie decides to go in her place, so she can tell Blanche what the psychiatrist thinks of the dreams. George does a monologue about dreams and superstitions. Gracie sees Dr. Blanchet (Joseph Kearns), the psychiatrist, and he says that there really isn't anything to be concerned about as far as the dreams go. But after talking to Gracie a little further, he decides she needs some help. The nurse calls Harry Morton and tells him to come over right away. After talking to the doctor, Harry begins to treat Blanche really nice because she may be a little crazy. Because of the way Harry is acting, Blanche thinks that maybe he's the one that's going nuts. Gracie talks to George about the people she met in the elevator. Gracie thinks that if Harry buys his wife presents when he thinks she's crazy, maybe if George think's Gracie's crazy he'll buy her presents, too. Bob Sweeney appears as Mr. Phillips the Gardener. Note: This plot line was repeated in Season 4 episode 23.
28	2	"The Beverly Hills Uplift Society"	Ralph Levy	Paul Henning, Sid Dorfman, Harvey Helm, William (Willy) Burns	October 11, 1951
The Beverly Hills Uplift Society was a carry-over from the radio series, and was an all-woman's social group. In this episode, Gracie spends the club's money to buy a wall safe, and has none left to pay the rent on the club room, leaving the society locked out. George explains to the audience that the club used to meet in the Burns house for five years. Gracie visits bank president Chester Vanderlip (Lou Merrill) who denies her request for a loan. Harry Morton refers to the club as "the Beverly Hills shoplifters". The club meets once again in the Burns home, to discuss fund raising ideas. Veteran actress Florence Bates appears as club president Mrs. McEveety. Gracie and the club make Harry Von Zell an honorary woman to vote on funds. He shows off a baby picture of himself as a "Carnation baby", after which von Zell's dialog is blatant advertising for the Carnation Evaporated Milk sponsor. George pays the club $120 to leave, which meets their fund raising target. Gracie talks to George about her experience at the shoe store. The club pays George back with a kiss for each dollar he donated. Verna Hillie appears as Clara Bagley. Margie Liszt appears as Carol. Mary Adams appears as Club Member.
29	3	"The Football Game"	Ralph Levy	Paul Henning, Sid Dorfman, Harvey Helm, William (Willy) Burns	October 25, 1951
The Burns and Mortons each buy four tickets for the football game and now have to get rid of the extra ones. George does a monologue about football games. Officer Johnson (Steve Pendleton) arrests Gracie for illegally trying to sell her tickets. He brings her to the station where Gracie has a confusing conversation with Sergeant Harris (Clancy Cooper). They finally can't deal with Gracie anymore and dismiss the charges. Harry Morton tells Blanche that he placed a bet on the game. George says that Gracie sold her tickets and then Blanche says she sold hers to Harry von Zell. Morton is frantic because it's his Alma Mater that is playing, but George says he's sure he can get the tickets back. George asks von Zell for the tickets, but Harry says he was going to take the President of Carnation to the game. George lets von Zell keep the tickets. Harry von Zell tells Mr. Phillips the Gardener about Carnation. Gracie buys four more tickets. George and Harry Morton wear large raccoon coats to the game.
30	4	"Surprise Birthday Party"	Ralph Levy	Sid Dorfman, Harvey Helm, William Burns, Jesse Goldstein, Nate Monaster	November 8, 1951
Blanche tells Gracie that it's Harry's birthday. Blanche is expecting some gifts to be delivered to the house. But she has to go out, so she asks Gracie to wait at the house for the gifts. While at the house, Gracie answers the phone. It's Charlie Hawthorne (Frank Gerstle) and he thinks he's talking to Blanche. He says that some of the boys from the club are giving her husband a surprise party that night. Gracie thinks he's talking about George. She tells George he has to stay home tonight because there's going to be a party for him. George does a monologue about parties. Gracie mentions George's party to Blanche and Blanche thinks Gracie is throwing the party for Harry. Harry Morton is upset because no one from his club mentioned his birthday. Blanche tells Harry that the Burns are giving him a surprise party. Gracie and von Zell come up with a plan to have someone bring George to the house later. But the plan goes wrong when the Attendant (Myron Healey) that is supposed to get George, takes Harry Morton away instead. That evening, they wait at the Burns house, but no one shows up. The mix up is straightened out when Harry Morton finds out that Gracie spoke with Charlie.
31	5	"Thanksgiving"	Ralph Levy	Paul Henning, Sid Dorfman, Harvey Helm, William (Willy) Burns	November 22, 1951
Harry Morton tells George to bet on a horse named Linda Lee. Harry says it's a great hunch bet because his business partner Casey (James Warren) just married a girl named Linda Lee. George does a monologue about Thanksgiving and turkey dinners. Gracie is having friends over for Thanksgiving dinner including Casey and his wife. Joe Crawford (Charles Lane), from the drugstore, drops off some cigars that George ordered. Joe says that Gracie should tell Harry that Linda Lee "didn't come in" and he shouldn't have thrown his money away on her. Gracie thinks Harry is running around with this woman and lets it slip to Blanche. Blanche confronts Harry and he tells her about the horse he bet on. Blanche tells Gracie that Linda Lee is a horse and Gracie thinks Blanche is talking about Casey's wife. When Casey and his wife show up, Gracie tells Linda Lee that Blanche called her a horse. But, Linda Lee knows that Gracie can get things confused. George tries to tell a joke, but one by one his friends interrupt him by leaving the room.
32	6	"New Dresses for the Concert"	Ralph Levy	Paul Henning, Sid Dorfman, Harvey Helm, William (Willy) Burns	December 6, 1951
Gracie tells Blanche that the Monetti String Ensemble will be performing at the Beverly Hills Uplift Society concert. Gracie and Blanche want new dresses to show off at the concert and they come up with a plan to get them. George does a monologue about wives out-smarting their husbands. George overheard the girls plan and tells Harry Morton about it. Salvatore Monetti (Jay Novello) comes by to talk to Gracie about the music the ensemble will be playing. Gracie has her usual confusing conversation with him. George tells Gracie he knows about their scheme and he's not buying her a new dress. Harry believes George went back on his word and bought Gracie a dress. Harry now gives Blanche money to get a dress. Harry von Zell comes by and explains how Gracie caused him to get into a car accident. Gracie tries another scheme, and George finally says yes she can get the dress. Turns out Gracie has already bought it.
33	7	"Christmas with Mamie Kelly"	Ralph Levy	Paul Henning, Sid Dorfman, Harvey Helm, William (Willy) Burns	December 20, 1951
Harry Morton hides his gift for Blanche (a purse and matching shoes) at the Burns house. Gracie tells Blanche that her friend Mamie Kelly (Sarah Selby), with her three daughters in tow, will be arriving for the holidays. George does a monologue about Christmas shopping and Gracie talking to other shoppers. Mamie has George running up and down the stairs trying to get the suitcase that has a present in it. Blanche has Gracie hide her gift for Harry in the Burns house. The Kelly daughters find the hidden gifts for Blanche and Harry. Blanche tells Harry her parents are coming over for Christmas. Harry von Zell arrives with the Santa costume George is going to wear. He brings with him Julie Lauren (Kathleen O'Malley), a secretary from Carnation. Gracie tells the children her own version of "A Christmas Carol." George dresses up as Santa Claus, but the girls know it's him. Eleven-year-old Jill St. John plays Kelly daughter Jill. Melinda Casey appears as Linda Kelly.
34	8	"Gracie's Storeroom"	Unknown	Unknown	January 3, 1952
Gracie has a storeroom built so she can store canned fruits and vegetables. When the project gets out of hand, George hires someone to pretend he's a building inspector to tell her she doesn't have a permit and will have to tear the storeroom down.
35	9	"Blanche for President"	Unknown	Unknown	January 17, 1952
Blanche runs for president of The Beverly Hills Uplift Society.
36	10	"Dinner with the Vanderlips"	Unknown	Unknown	January 31, 1952
George and Harry have some trouble when the Vanderlips are invited over to the Burns home for dinner.
37	11	"Gracie and the Dented Fender"	Ralph Levy	Unknown	February 14, 1952
Gracie accidentally dents the fender on the family car, and decides to get it fixed without telling George about it. To keep George from noticing, she tries to convince George that the Burnses and Mortons should walk to a football game rather than drive.
38	12	"Trip to Palm Springs"	Ralph Levy	Paul Henning, Sid Dorfman, Harvey Helm, William (Willy) Burns	February 28, 1952
Gracie tells Blanche that her and George are going to Jack Benny's Palm Springs home. They will be on his show and rehearse with him. Gracie suggests that Blanche come with. Blanche doesn't think Harry would let her go. Gracie wants Blanche to fake an illness so Harry will let her tag along. Harry von Zell comes by with his agent Lou Cooper to discuss Harry's contract. George isn't around, so they decide to come back later. George does a monologue about staying at Jack Benny's house. Harry Morton isn't buying the story that Blanche is sick. George sings a few lines from the Jack Benny song "If You Say 'I Beg Your Pardon,' Then I'll Come Back to You". Dr. Johnson (Joseph Kearns) comes by with Mary Benny's dog, Suzette. Harry Morton sees the Doctor and now thinks Blanche is really sick, so he lets her go on the trip. Lou and von Zell tell George that Harry has a chance for a part in a movie and he would like to do more acting on George's show. George, Gracie and Blanche chat while driving to Benny's house.
39	13	"Gracie's Engagement Ring"	Ralph Levy	Paul Henning, Sid Dorfman, Harvey Helm, William (Willy) Burns	March 13, 1952
George tells Harry von Zell that the rehearsal went long and he wants Harry to cut some time off his commercial. Gracie tells George that she can't find her engagement ring. Harry suggests to Gracie that the ring may have been stolen and they should report it to the police. A cleaning woman finds the ring and gives it to George. George does a monologue about Gracie and losing engagement rings. He decides he'll teach her a lesson by not returning it to her right away. Lt. Smith (Steve Pendleton) comes by to handle the case about Gracie's stolen ring. He brings with him notorious pickpocket Fingers Leeds (Jerry Hausner) as a possible suspect. Gracie says she doesn't recognize him. As they are leaving, Fingers steals the ring from George. Meanwhile, Harry von Zell brings over his mother Jane (Ida Moore). She begs George not to cut short Harry's commercial and George says he won't. Turns out Jane was an actress Harry hired to fool George. George knew Jane was an actress. George and Gracie have a discussion about pawn shops. Fingers returns the ring to George because he said he got a good look at it.
40	14	"Harry and the Gold Digger"	Unknown	Unknown	March 27, 1952
To help Jane out of a tricky situation, Gracie sets up Harry von Zell with gold-digging Flossie Hardwick. Meanwhile, a pie promoter tries to sell George on a new gimmick to improve the show.
41	15	"The Good Old Days of Vaudeville"	Ralph Levy	Paul Henning, Sid Dorfman, Harvey Helm, William (Willy) Burns	April 10, 1952
While downtown, Gracie and Blanche run into Harry von Zell and he offers them a ride home. Before they leave, a man (Theodore von Eltz) says hello to Gracie. Gracie speaks to him for awhile and says how nice it is to see him. After he goes, Gracie asks Blanche and zon Zell who he was. George does a monologue about the man Gracie just spoke to and how he was the best man at their wedding. He also talks about Barney Dean (Richard "Skeets" Gallagher), who's writing a documentary on the good old days of vaudeville. Because Gracie is at an auction, Blanche makes a lunch for George but Harry Morton eats most of it. Gracie comes back from the auction having bought a lot of stuff. Barney Dean comes by the house to discuss George and Gracie's experience in vaudeville. While Barney tries to talk to George, zon Zell keeps interrupting with talk about Carnation. George gives Barney a scrap book about his time in vaudeville. Mr. Walsh, a photographer sent by Mr. Dean, arrives. While taking pictures, Gracie tells George about some of the other things she bought at the auction. Gracie dances an Irish Jig.
42	16	"Jack Benny Steals George's Joke"	Ralph Levy	Paul Henning, Sid Dorfman, Harvey Helm, William (Willy) Burns	April 24, 1952
George is upset with Jack Benny when Jack steals George's joke at a benefit performance in San Francisco. On the train ride home, the waiter brags to George about how he got Jack's autograph and then fails to ask George for his. Jack talks to Gracie about how he can get George to speak to him again. Jack joins George for "dueling monologues" about each other. Back at home, Gracie tells Blanche about George and Jack's fight. Mr. Ackerman (Theodore von Eltz) from CBS comes by to try and find a way for George and Jack to make up. He suggests that George apologize to Jack and George tells him to leave. Jack and George continue their dueling monologue and insult one another. Harry von Zell and the Mortons discuss the how to resolve the fight. But, they come to the conclusion that George is a trouble maker. Jack and George continue their insult monologues. Jack comes over to the house and the two men apologize to each other.
43	17	"Gracie's Redecoration Scheme"	Ralph Levy	Paul Henning, Sid Dorfman, Harvey Helm, William (Willy) Burns	May 8, 1952
Gracie tells Blanche about a party she went to at Irene Dunne's house. She says that Irene just had her house redecorated by Mr. Binkley (Joseph Kearns). Gracie wants to redecorate her living room, so she needs to get George out of the house for a couple days. She hopes to have George take Harry Morton on a fishing trip. George knows about Gracie wanting to redecorate. George does a monologue about Gracie trying to out-smart people and about how he knows nothing about fishing. Mr. Binkley comes by to discuss the redecoration. Harry tells George that he won't be able to go fishing. Blanche asks Harry von Zell to take George fishing, but he can't go either. Gracie tells George he should go away for a couple days for his health. George says he'll go stay at the Morton's house. Steve Pendleton appears as Moving Man.
44	18	"The Speech Writer"	Ralph Levy	Paul Henning, Sid Dorfman, Harvey Helm, William (Willy) Burns	May 22, 1952
Mamie Kelly and her obnoxious kids again park their trailer in George and Gracie's driveway and cause lots of trouble as they obstruct George's endeavor to write a speech.
45	19	"Divorce Attorney"	Ralph Levy	Paul Henning, Sid Dorfman, Harvey Helm, William (Willy) Burns	June 5, 1952
Gracie has a confusing conversation with her postman. Gracie has an appointment with a Swami to have her fortune told. George does a monologue about fortune tellers. The Swami tells Gracie she will be married twice. She tells Blanche that she called a lawyer so she can divorce George and then marry him again. The Attorney (Walter Woolf King) arrives to discuss the divorce. Harry von Zell drops by and starts to tell about a hold up he saw at the bank. But he stops mid-way when he hears about the divorce. The lawyer tells Gracie she has to act as though George were a cruel man. Blanche has George dress up like a Swami and talk Gracie out of the divorce. While Gracie goes to get some money, Harry von Zell shows up dressed as a Swami and George then leaves. Lt. Dixon (Steve Pendleton) arrives to say he's looking for the Swami because he's really a bookmaker. Dixon arrests both von Zell and George. As they are leaving Harry Morton shows up dressed as a Swami and is arrested as well.
46	20	"The Musical Scam"	Ralph Levy	Paul Henning, Sid Dorfman, Harvey Helm, William (Willy) Burns	June 19, 1952
Gracie and Blanche are on a cab ride home from shopping. Blanche tells Gracie that Harry met two producers and invested $500 in a musical. Blanche thinks George should meet the producers because he would know if it's a good show or not. George does a monologue about people changing their jobs. Producers Dick Fisher (Hal March) and Buddy Pepper come by to see George. After talking to Gracie first, they come up with an idea to get George to invest. They tell George that he will have the lead in the show and do plenty of singing. George writes them a check for $5000. Harry Morton talks Harry zon Zell into investing in the show. But Morton later learns that they hired a lead that can't carry a tune and is afraid they will lose all their money. They come to realize it's George that's playing the lead and now feel even worse. Gracie tells George she heard that the lead is really terrible and they should get their money back. The producers come by to return all the money, saying they are calling off the show and come up with a silly excuse. Everyone tries to cheer George up by saying they love his singing. George tries to sing some songs for them, but they keep interrupting him.
47	21	"Dual Meanings"	Ralph Levy	Paul Henning, Sid Dorfman, Harvey Helm, William (Willy) Burns	July 3, 1952
Blanche and Madge the Manicurist (Barbara Pepper) tell Gracie that one has to be concerned when a man hires a secretary. George tells Harry von Zell that there's nothing like having a loving and trusting wife. Gracie then yells at George about running around after secretaries. George does a monologue about the secretary desk he just ordered and jealousy. Gracie hires Montague the Private Detective (James Flavin) to follow George. Montague mistakes Harry Morton for George. Harry von Zell reads Montague's report to Harry Morton, which leads them to believe George is seeing Blanche. Morton confronts George and Blanche. George explains Montague's mistake to Harry. Gracie tells George she's leaving him. George tries to explain that the secretary is a desk.
48	22	"The Great Gazatti"	Ralph Levy	Paul Henning, Sid Dorfman, Harvey Helm, William (Willy) Burns	July 17, 1952
Hy Averback opens the show and states that he's replacing Harry von Zell for this week because he isn't feeling too well. Gracie feels bad that no one has given George a singing job. George does a monologue about the bad breaks he's had trying to be a singer. Record company exec Mr. Simon is expecting The Great Gazatti (Spanish musical star Fortunio Bonanova). Simon mistakes Gracie for Gazatti's wife. Gracie plays along and says Gazatti will sign a contract if Simon also makes a record with George Burns. George shows up and Simon sends him to a studio to record some songs. Gazatti, who speaks no English, shows up but won't sign the contract. Gracie comes up with a story about Gazatti having sick relatives. Simon brings George a contract for his novelty record. But before George can sign it, they hear from the head of the record company and he doesn't like George's record.
49	23	"The $50,000 Lie"	Ralph Levy	Unknown	July 31, 1952
The Mortons invite George and Gracie to the Happy Time Lodge, but George doesn't want to go so he comes up with a story that he has to come up with $50,000 that night and he won't be able to go if he doesn't get the money. Gracie overhears this and, thinking that she and George are broke, plans to rent out their spare rooms to boarders.
50	24	"The Stolen Racehorse"	Ralph Levy	Unknown	August 14, 1952
Gracie goes to the racetrack and winds up buying a horse. The horse's former owners accompany Gracie back to the house and wind up moving in. Meanwhile, the police have been looking for the horse because the animal's "owners" are actually horse thieves--and they track it to George's house.
51	25	"The Spectacular Spectacle Debacle"	Ralph Levy	Sid Dorfman, Harvey Helm, William Burns, Jesse Goldstein, Nate Monaster	August 28, 1952
George tells Gracie that he ran into George Jessel at the Friars Club, but Gracie somehow misinterprets it into thinking that George thinks he needs glasses. She gets an eye doctor to come to the house to give George an exam, but it turns out that the doctor needs glasses more than anyone else does. Joseph Kearns guest stars as an optometrist Gracie hires to examine George's eyes.
52	26	"Gracie and Blanche Want to Redecorate"	Ralph Levy	Paul Henning, Sid Dorfman, Harvey Helm, William (Willy) Burns	September 25, 1952
Blanche tells Gracie how surprised she is that Harry agreed to have the house redecorated. The girls hope Harry von Zell can convince George to redecorate as well. But George has a way to stop Harry before he can even suggest anything. George does a monologue about decorating and modern new homes. Blanche finds out that the decorator will only do their house for free provided that the Burns house is included. Blanche tells Harry she will not do their house under those conditions and she will tell Gracie not to do hers. What she didn't know is that was a trick set up by Harry and George. Blanche overhears the two men talking and now knows about the trick. After finding out what George did, Gracie hires Mr. Slayton (Walter Woolf King), a decorator. Gracie tries to get George out of the house for the decorator by saying her relatives are going to visit. George knows what she is up to and plays along. Note: The Last Live episode.

=== Season 3 (1952–53) ===
No. overall	No. in season	Title	Directed by	Written by	Original release date
53	1	"Wardrobe Woman Wins Free Trip to Hawaii"	Ralph Levy	Sid Dorfman, Harvey Helm, Paul Henning & William Burns	October 9, 1952
Gracie's wardrobe woman Jane (Elvia Allman) has won a trip for two to Hawaii. Jane mentions that it is a wonderful place for a honeymoon. George does a monologue about the times Gracie tries to play cupid and about things in Hawaii. Gracie hopes to get Harry Von Zell and Jane together. When Harry says he does not want to get married, Gracie tries a Matrimonial Bureau. Jane overhears Gracie talking to the Matrimonial Bureau and tells Blanche that Gracie may be leaving George. George and Gracie talk about when they got married. What Gracie does not realize is that the Jane is already married and has two children. James Flavin appears as Frank, Jane's husband. Hal March appears as Michael Rockford from the Bureau.
54	2	"Gracie Giving Party for Atomic Scientist"	Ralph Levy	Sid Dorfman, Harvey Helm, Paul Henning & William Burns	October 16, 1952
Gracie wants to give a dinner party for Dr. Cherot (Maurice Marsac), a famous but somewhat eccentric atomic scientist, who never accepts invitations. George is upset about what the party is going to cost him. George does a monologue about meeting scientists. Dr. Cherot hears that George was in Las Vegas at the time of the atomic testing and, thinking that George is a fellow scientist, accepts Gracie's invitation. Blanche volunteers her and Harry's services when the hired butler and maid quit. At the party Dr. Cherot finds out George is not a scientist and leaves. George tells Gracie her guests will be disappointed, but she says that is OK because she forgot to mail the invites.
55	3	"George Sneezing; Gracie Thinks He's Insane"	Ralph Levy	Sid Dorfman, Harvey Helm, Paul Henning & William Burns	October 23, 1952
George has been sneezing for a comedy routine. Blanche, thinking George is catching a cold, suggests to Gracie that he see a doctor. George does a monologue about parts he'd like to do and about singing and singers. Knowing that George hates going to a doctor, Gracie takes a medical exam for him. Dr. Philips (Walter Woolf King) concludes she should see a psychiatrist. Of course, Gracie takes this to mean that George needs to see the psychiatrist. Meanwhile, Blanche catches a dieting Harry Morton hiding food all over the house. When Gracie thinks that George may need shock treatments, her and Harry von Zell try to do things that will shock him. George explains that he is sneezing because of the script to the show. Gracie then burns the scripts hoping that will stop George's sneezing. Hal March as Dick Fisher.
56	4	"Gracie Buying Boat for George"	Ralph Levy	Sid Dorfman, Harvey Helm, Nate Monaster, Jesse Goldstein & William Burns	October 30, 1952
Gracie thinks that George is working too much and that he needs to get a hobby and relax. George does a monologue about hobbies. Gracie has a confusing conversation with Hal Hackett (Bob Sweeney), the boat salesman. Without him actually knowing it, Harry Morton and Gracie get George to buy an expensive boat. Harry Morton and Harry Von Zell figure that they'll be the ones to use the boat the most. Gracie tells George about the boat and he refuses to pay for it. Gracie, Harry and Harry need to find a way to make George want the boat. Gracie tries to make George think he's going crazy, but he just plays along. They then try a scheme to make George think he is someone named "Charlie Cochran". When Hal Hackett comes by again, George gets the last laugh by signing the boat contract as Charlie Cochran.
57	5	"Gracie Having George's Portrait Painted"	Ralph Levy	Sid Dorfman, Harvey Helm, Nate Monaster, Jesse Goldstein & William Burns	November 6, 1952
While trying to figure out what to get George for his birthday, Blanche suggests having a portrait painted of him. George does a monologue about paintings and art. Gracie hires artist William Gregory and explains to him that she wants to give the portrait to George as a surprise gift. Blanche wants to give George one of Harry's ties as a present, but Harry wraps a banana peel instead. The painter is confounded when Gracie wants him to paint George from inside a closet. George knows what's going on and says that anyone that paints from inside a closet has to be a phony. The painting turns out wonderful. Joseph Kearns appears as Mr. Blackwell, the painter's agent.
58	6	"Gracie and Blanche Hire Two Gigolos to Take Them Out"	Ralph Levy	Sid Dorfman, Harvey Helm, Nate Monaster, Jesse Goldstein & William Burns	November 13, 1952
Blanche and Gracie want to have a night out on the town with their husbands, but the boys are not having any part of it. George does a monologue about the problems married people have. Frustrated after the men continually ignore pointed hints, the wives decide to hire a pair of male "escorts" to take them out, thinking that might finally wake up their husbands. After one escort has a confusing conversation with Gracie and the other is repeatedly sent to the delicatessen by Harry Morton, the men claim they are on strike and leave. What follows is a lot of confusion with the Mortons and the Burns about whether they are going or not. Gerald Mohr appears as one of the Gigolos.
59	7	"Sampter Clayton Ballet; Selling Tickets"	Ralph Levy	Sid Dorfman, Harvey Helm, Nate Monaster, Jesse Goldstein & William Burns	November 20, 1952
George wants nothing to do with sponsoring a ballet, but Gracie's very interested. George does a monologue about the ballet. Charles Sampter (Joseph Kearns) of the Sampter Clayton ballet comes by to drop off 200 tickets that Gracie needs to sell. When George asks Gracie who the man in their house is, she tells him he's an undertaker. George then has a confusing conversation with Charles. Gracie's friends try and sell the tickets to each other. To hopefully get George more interested in the ballet, Gracie hires two of the ballet dancers and has them pose as the family's maid and butler. In the end, George sells all the tickets and tells Gracie he'll sponsor the ballet.
60	8	"Skating Pearsons Come to Visit"	Ralph Levy	Sid Dorfman, Harvey Helm, Nate Monaster, Jesse Goldstein & William Burns	November 27, 1952
A couple from George and Gracie's vaudeville days, "The Skating Pearsons" (Barbara Pepper and Richard "Skeets" Gallagher) drop by for a visit. They are worried that their son, Joey (Stuffy Singer), wants to get into show business and they would rather he be a doctor. George does a monologue about young children getting into show business. Molly and Joe ask George and Gracie to talk the boy out of it. Gracie calls Emily Marsh (Verna Felton), a child guidance counselor, and what follows is some confusion over who little Joey is. Harry von Zell comes up with a plan to make Joey think that the Burns have no money and show business is not profitable. But George comes in and interrupts the plan. While George is trying to talk Joey into becoming a doctor, Molly and Joe get a 5 week booking in Chicago and decide they need Joey in the act.
61	9	"Gracie Selling Swamp So Harry Will Buy TV Set"	Ralph Levy	Sid Dorfman, Harvey Helm, Nate Monaster, Jesse Goldstein & William Burns	December 4, 1952
Blanche wants Harry to buy her another TV. He says if he could sell some swampland in Malibu he would do it. George does a monologue about how people ask him to plug their product on his show. Gracie puts an ad in the paper selling the swampland but calls it a fruit orchard. Mr. Gibson (Lou Merrill), a lawyer, says he will sue George because his clients were defrauded and Gracie didn't even own the land. George offers to buy the land from Harry. Harry gets the idea that there is oil under the property and refuses to sell it to George. George calls Bob Standish (Bob Sweeney), a geologist, to prove there's no oil. Bob has a confusing conversation with Gracie. George is able to straighten things out with Mr. Gibson. Believing he's rich, Harry goes on a spending spree until George tells him there's no oil. Phil Tead appears as Joe.
62	10	"Silky Thompson/Gracie Writes 'My Life with George Burns'"	Ralph Levy	Sid Dorfman, Harvey Helm, Nate Monaster, Jesse Goldstein & William Burns	December 11, 1952
When Gracie writes an article for LOOK magazine, she naively fabricates a story about a George's fighting prowess in which he knocks out infamous gangster Silky Thompson (Sheldon Leonard). George does a monologue about Gracie not being very subtle and how no one asks him to write anything. Meanwhile, Harry Morton finally sells his swampland to a woman. The affronted Thompson shows up at the Burns home and is immediately bollixed by Gracie who literally and figuratively disarms him. Gracie further clouds the situation by introducing George as Harry and vice versa. George is afraid Silky is going to harm him, but Silky figures that being with Gracie is painful enough. George has a confusing conversation with Gracie about the article she wrote. The husband of the woman that Harry sold the swampland to comes looking for him. The husband believes Silky is Harry and knocks him out.
63	11	"Gracie Thinks George is Going to Commit Suicide"	Ralph Levy	Sid Dorfman, Harvey Helm, Nate Monaster, Jesse Goldstein & William Burns	December 18, 1952
Gracie's mother is to come for a three week visit. Mr. Franklin, the drycleaner, finds a disturbing note in George's coat pocket. He tells Gracie he believes it to be a suicide note. George does a monologue about how it's not a suicide note and misunderstandings. George is about to clarify matters, when he realizes that this misunderstanding might keep Gracie's Mother from visiting. Harry Morton and Harry von Zell argue over who will get George's golf clubs. Gracie calls for Dr. Coleman (Maurice Marsac), a psychiatrist. He winds up examining her. Blanche overhears George tell Harry the whole suicide thing is a fake and tells Gracie. The girls come up with a plan to get even.
64	12	"Von Zell Dates Married Woman; Jealous Husband"	Ralph Levy	Sid Dorfman, Harvey Helm, Nate Monaster, Jesse Goldstein & William Burns	December 25, 1952
Harry Von Zell goes out with Sylvia Nelson, not knowing she is a married woman. Harry finds out she only did it to make her husband (Hugh Sanders) jealous. Gracie interferes by calling Mr. Nelson and telling him she is Harry Von Zell's wife and Sylvia should stop seeing him. She also gives Mr. Nelson Harry Morton's address as her own. George does a monologue about bachelors and happy marriages. Because of the mistaken-identity, Mr. Nelson files a lawsuit against Harry Morton. Blanche now wants to leave Harry. George goes over to Sylvia's house to try and straighten things out. Now Gracie thinks George is also involved with her. George invites the Nelson's over and manages to get things worked out. Elvia Allman appears as wardrobe woman Jane.
65	13	"Uncle Clyde Comes to Visit; Renting Room"	Ralph Levy	Sid Dorfman, Harvey Helm, Nate Monaster, Jesse Goldstein & William Burns	January 1, 1953
Gracie's Uncle Clyde (Howard McNear), who used to do a paper tearing act, is coming to visit. George does a monologue about unwanted guests. George wants to rent out their spare room so Uncle Clyde will not have a place stay. Harry Morton gets involved by asking Mr. Fitzpatrick (Charles Lane) to rent the room instead. Gracie has never seen Uncle Clyde and mistakes Fitzpatrick for him. When the real Uncle Clyde shows up, George mistakes him for Harry Morton's friend Fitzpatrick. George throws out the real Fitzpatrick, inadvertently giving the room to Uncle Clyde after all. Note: When this episode was first rerun, a new introduction was filmed featuring the Burns' children, Ronnie (who later joined the cast) and Sandra. This intro was included in the syndicated version that aired on the Antennae TV network.
66	14	"Gracie Thinks Harry Morton Is in Love With Her"	Ralph Levy	Sid Dorfman, Harvey Helm, Nate Monaster, Jesse Goldstein & William Burns	January 8, 1953
Because of a ruse Harry Morton pulls, Gracie thinks he's in love with her. George does a monologue about how he likes to sing and other people's ambitions. Gracie has a confusing conversation with Mr. Wheaton (Marvin Miller), a salesman. Harry shows Gracie the diamond locket he bought as an anniversary present for Blanche. She thinks it's a gift for her. Gracie takes it so Blanche doesn't see it. Because of something Gracie says, Blanche believes Harry is in love with someone else. To prove he loves her, Harry goes to show Blanche the gift, but it's gone. George finds the locket and asks Gracie where it came from. More confusion follows which leads to Gracie believing it was her that got Harry and Blanche back together.
67	15	"Gracie Trying to Keep Mortons from Moving Away"	Ralph Levy	Sid Dorfman, Harvey Helm, Nate Monaster, Jesse Goldstein & William Burns	January 15, 1953
Harry Morton wants to trade his house with the Johnson's across town, and the Burns will have new neighbors. Gracie says she'll trade her house as well to be closer to Blanche. George does a monologue about liking his neighborhood and not wanting to trade his house. Harry von Zell tries to convince Morton that the Johnson house is falling apart, but Gracie accidentally ruins the plan. Gracie has a confusing conversation with Mr. Duffy (Lester Matthews), a lawyer. Gracie invites Mrs. Johnson over for tea and has a plan to discourage her from moving. It turns out all George had to do was sing and that was enough to make the new neighbors change their mind.
68	16	"Gracie Thinks She's Not Married to George"	Ralph Levy	Sid Dorfman, Harvey Helm, Nate Monaster, Jesse Goldstein & William Burns	January 22, 1953
Gracie sees a movie in which an actor playing a judge looks exactly like the judge who originally married her and George. Plus, with their marriage license being burned in a fire, Gracie believes she and George are not legally married. George does a monologue about not being married and what he would do. Gracie leaves George and moves in with Blanche and Harry Morton. George asks Miss Barry (Fay Baker) from Saks Fifth Ave to come by because he wants to give Gracie a gift. What follows is some confusion as to George's true intentions. Jack Benny does a monologue about George and Gracie's wedding. Harry Von Zell suggests to George that the quickest way to erase Gracie's doubts would be to re-marry her. Jack, who was at their wedding, manages to convince Gracie that she and George are married. George comes back with Judge Harris, which only succeeds in confusing Gracie even more.
69	17	"Tax Refund"	Ralph Levy	Sid Dorfman, Harvey Helm, Nate Monaster, Jesse Goldstein, William Burns	January 29, 1953
Gracie receives a tax refund. She invites Los Angeles Mayor Fletcher Bowron to dinner so she can give him the money back. George does a monologue about the Mayor coming to dinner and political anecdotes. Harry Morton tells Blanche about his day in court. Harry does not believe Blanche that Bowron will be dining with George and Gracie. Bowron arrives and helps Gracie in the kitchen. Harry promises to buy Blanche a mink coat if the Mayor is at the Burns house. After dinner Gracie tells George about her experience at the market. Phillips Tead appears as Mr. Larkin, the Postman. Lurene Tuttle appears as Miss Bradley, the Mayor's secretary.
70	18	"Cigarette Girl; Georgie Jessel; Teddy Bear"	Ralph Levy	Sid Dorfman, Harvey Helm, Nate Monaster, Jesse Goldstein, William Burns	February 5, 1953
George sings at a benefit at Ciro's nightclub. The next day, the Louella Parsons column has a blind gossip item about a "popular comedian" (meant to be George Jessel) tipping a Ciro's cigarette girl $50 for a teddy bear. The gossip item, plus finding a teddy bear in their house, leads Gracie to believe her husband is having an affair with the cigarette girl. George does a monologue about Georgie Jessel borrowing the money from him to tip the girl. Blanche Morton finds a poker chip in husband Harry's pocket, evidence he was at an all-night poker game, which he denies by saying he was with George all night at Ciro's. George backs up Morton's lie. Gracie invites Mimi Watson (Julie Bennett), the cigarette girl, into her home. Harry Von Zell cuddles up with Watson in the living room. When George arrives, it is obvious she never met him before, saying that Jessel said Burns was his father. Gracie telephones George Jessel who explains it all, but Morton shows up to say George was playing poker with him all night.
71	19	"Gracie on Train; Murder"	Ralph Levy	Sid Dorfman, Harvey Helm, Nate Monaster, Jesse Goldstein, William Burns	February 12, 1953
On a train trip from San Francisco without George, Mr. Lindstrom (John Vosper) at Gracie's table makes a bad joke about going home to kill his wife. Everyone knows it was a joke, except Gracie, who upon the advice of Harry Morton, reports the incident to the police. George does a monologue about Gracie's family. The conversation with the police gets confused and they believe she named Morton as the murderous husband. Detective Sawyer (James Flavin) stops by the Morton house, where Harry is attested after joking he "got rid of" Blanche so he can eat what he wants. Gracie telephones the police and manages to get George arrested, then von Zell. The police detective interviews Gracie, resulting in his giving up trying to understand. Lindstrom visits the Burns house to return Gracie's gloves that she left on the train. Gracie remembers he is the murderer, and phones the police. Detective Sawyer, having said earlier that if he could not crack the case he would join the others in the cell, does so. Robert Bray appears as Major Cunningham. Peter Leeds appears as Mr. Garland. Note: For the first CBS rerun, George Burns filmed a new intro in which he argues with a magazine salesman on the telephone. This intro was later included in the cut which aired on the Antenna TV network.
72	20	"Blanche Wants New Car; Gracie Gets Von Zell a Wife"	Ralph Levy	Sid Dorfman, Harvey Helm, Nate Monaster, Jesse Goldstein, William Burns	February 19, 1953
Blanche Morton complains that her husband Harry, who states that one car is all they need, is too cheap to buy a car for her personal use. In Gracie's confusion over a conversation with Harry Von Zell regarding a hypothetical $3,000 potential tax deduction for a wife and three children, she believes he is offering $3,000 to find him a wife with three children. By her logic, she could earn enough money finding von Zell a wife, to buy a car for Blanche. George does a monologue about income tax. She places an ad for a wife, which is answered by Mrs. Rodney (Verna Felton), a woman who already has three grown unemployed sons by three different husbands. Gracie says the man wanting a wife is a handsome television star. Mrs. Rodney believes the potential groom is George. When it is clarified that the ad was for Harry Von Zell, Mrs. Rodney's three unemployed grown sons show up to try to strong arm von Zell into marrying their mother. Gracie, with Blanches help, gets von Zell off the hook. Richard Reeves and John Crawford appear as two of the sons.
73	21	"Gracie Gives a Swamp Party"	Ralph Levy	Sid Dorfman, Harvey Helm, Nate Monaster, Jesse Goldstein, William Burns	February 26, 1953
While having lunch at the Burns house, Harry Morton tells Gracie he needs the "right party" to unload four acres of worthless swampland. Gracie wants to throw Harry a party to help him sell the land. George does a monologue about Gracie's swamp party and other unusual parties. Gracie has a confusing conversation with Chef Baroni (Nestor Paiva), who she hired for the party. Harry is sick in bed and won't be able to go to the party. Then Blanche catches his cold. The party results in an auction where a man says he will act as Gracie's shill to sell the land. But because of Gracie he winds up buying the land. George and Gracie bring Harry the check. Phil Arnold appears as a Delivery Man. Jack Rice appears as Mr. Peters. Bess Flowers appears as a guest.
74	22	"George and Gracie Hear a Burglar; Up All Night"	Ralph Levy	Sid Dorfman, Harvey Helm, Nate Monaster, Jesse Goldstein, William Burns	March 5, 1953
Between Harry and Blanche Morton overstaying their visit, and Harry Von Zell showing up with his date, George is anxious for everyone to leave so he can get some sleep. George does a monologue about sleep, trying to get people to leave and forgetting things. Trying to sleep at their own home, Blanche sends Harry outside to turn off his auto headlights. George and Gracie see him walking around and think he is a prowler. George goes out to check. Back in the Morton house, Blanche sees George walking around and mistakes him for the prowler. Gracie phones the police, and Detective Sawyer (James Flavin) shows up to investigate, but no one is found. Harry Morton is outside with his gun looking for the prowler, and shoots at George. While the police take another look around, Gracie tells George about her Uncle Harvey. When Harry Von Zell returns from his date, the police arrest him. George and Morton figure out it was each other that they saw. The police find that their car has been stolen. William Henry appears as Mack, another Detective.
75	23	"Gracie Buying a Ranch for George"	Ralph Levy	Sid Dorfman, Harvey Helm, Nate Monaster, Jesse Goldstein, William Burns	March 12, 1953
Gracie mistakenly believes George wants to invest in a ranch, so she starts looking for one that is for sale. George does a monologue about owning a ranch and being a farmer. Harry Morton and his real estate partner Casey (Hal March) have several listings to show Gracie. They send over a Mr. Warner to talk to Gracie about his ranch. George has no desire to own a ranch. He plans to have Harry Von Zell, in a bearded disguise, pose as a doctor to tell Gracie that George's health will not allow him to live on a ranch. Casey, also wearing a bearded doctor disguise, tells Gracie that George is healthy enough to own a ranch. Harry von Zell shows up in the same disguise. When the two men wind up in the same room with Gracie, she decides she does not want to buy a ranch after all. Note: March had played a fake doctor a year earlier on I Love Lucy, hired by husband Ricky Ricardo to convince Lucy she was critically ill.
76	24	"Gracie Gets George in the Army"	Ralph Levy	Sid Dorfman, Harvey Helm, Nate Monaster, Jesse Goldstein, William Burns	March 19, 1953
Harry Morton is due for a doctor's examination for an insurance policy. Inspired by her dress maker Mary's (Paula Winslowe) account of the Army Reserve improving her husband Charlie's' health, Gracie insists George also enlist in the reserve. George brushes off the idea, and their friend General Peterson (Bert Moorhouse) tells Gracie George is too old. Nevertheless, at her insistence, he sets up George for a physical in the Burns home with an Army doctor (Grandon Rhodes). George does a monologue about how ridiculous it would be for him to be in the army. Harry Morton walks into the Burns living room, and is mistaken for George by the Army doctor, who pronounces him in perfect health. Gracie realizes the mistake and visits the recruiting office to enlist George, and is told George is too old for the Army. George goes to Harry's house and is mistakenly examined by Dr. Mangrum (Rolfe Sedan), the insurance doctor. Because of some mix-ups, both Morton and George are enlisted in the Army and are picked up by military police. Richard Erdman appears as the Recruiting Sgt.
77	25	"Gracie Reports Car Stolen"	Ralph Levy	Sid Dorfman, Harvey Helm, Nate Monaster, Jesse Goldstein, William Burns	March 26, 1953
George and Gracie are performing in a stage play. Someone whistles in George's dressing room. Gracie believes the old show-biz superstition that it will mean three days of bad luck for George. Gracie tells Harry Von Zell to put George's car in von Zell's garage so George can't make a scheduled trip to Palm Springs. George believes it was stolen and files a report with the police. George does a monologue about show-biz superstitions. He then arranges for Harry Morton to drive him to Palm Springs. Blanche is upset that Harry is not taking her along, and gets Gracie to tell von Zell to also put the Morton's car in his garage, resulting in Morton also filing a stolen car report. Gracie calls Detective Sawyer and tells him George stole the car for the insurance money. George rents a car and his chauffeur/ex-writer Gordon (Rory Mallinson) arrives to drive him to Palm Springs. Detective Sawyer shows up to arrest George, Morton and von Zell. Things are explained and George and Morton leave for Palm Springs in George's car. He is arrested on the way by the police because his car is still on the "hot car" list. Peter Leeds appears as the insurance investigator. Isabel Jewell appears as Sally, an actress friend of Gracie's.
78	26	"Gracie Pretends to Be a College Boy's Mother"	Ralph Levy	Sid Dorfman, Harvey Helm, Nate Monaster, Jesse Goldstein, William Burns	March 30, 1953
College student Ronnie Gilbert (David Bair) lies to impress his girlfriend Sandy (Ruta Lee as Ruta Kilmonis in one of her first acting roles), telling her he lives in the Burns home. Gracie suggests she and George pretend to be his parents to impress Sandy. George does a monologue about lies. When George balks at the pretense, Gracie recruits Harry Von Zell to do it, and Blanche Morton recruits her husband Harry for the same thing. Ronnie picks up Mr. and Mrs. Cummings (Grandon Rhodes and Kay Riehl), Sandy's parents, and brings them to Gracie's house. Unfortunately, both Harrys and George show up and are introduced as Ronnie's father. Ronnie explains things and it all works out.
79	27	"Misunderstanding Over Buying Mountain Cabin"	Ralph Levy	Sid Dorfman, Harvey Helm, Nate Monaster, Jesse Goldstein, William Burns	April 6, 1953
Gracie believes George is buying a mountain cabin at Big Bear Lake, after real estate agent Mr. Larkin (Lester Matthews) calls her. In reality, it is Harry Von Zell who is doing the buying and listed George as a reference. Things get complicated when Gracie tells Harry Morton that George is buying the cabin, causing Morton to feel resentment that George is not going through him to buy the cabin. George does a monologue about misunderstandings and marriage problems. Gracie feels bad that George is not using Harry Morton to buy the cabin. Gracie also manages to get von Zell's credit standing with Larkin ruined. Now von Zell wants out of his contract with George. George thinks that von Zell must have another job offer and he won't let him out of the contract. After von Zell finds out that Larkin was actually a swindler, both Harrys apologize to George.
80	28	"Blanche Secretly Buys a Fur Stole"	Ralph Levy	Sid Dorfman, Harvey Helm, Nate Monaster, Jesse Goldstein, William Burns	April 13, 1953
Blanche Morton buys a mink stole, but does not want her husband Harry to know. She tells Harry that Gracie bought the stole, and then asks Gracie to keep it at her house. George does a monologue about women fooling men and keeping secrets. Things get twisted around, the mink stole disappears from Gracie's house, and Gracie phones police Detective Sawyer to investigate. To avoid having to deal with Gracie again, Sawyer demotes himself to a beat cop. Gracie has a confusing conversation with Captain Benson (Herbert Rawlinson). Adding to the confusion, various people keep moving the mink back and forth between Gracie and Blanche's house. In the end Blanche tells Harry the truth and George gets a mink for Gracie.
81	29	"Gracie Takes Spanish Lessons"	Ralph Levy	Sid Dorfman, Harvey Helm, Nate Monaster, Jesse Goldstein, William Burns	April 20, 1953
Gracie and Blanche are taking Spanish lessons at night school. Harry and George are tired of cooking for themselves and would like the girls to quit. Harry von Zell suggests the girls take lessons at home from Spanish language teacher Juan Rodriguez (Alberto Morin). George does a monologue about knowing a foreign language. Gracie tries to help Juan with his visa renewal. The immigration official Mr. Dalton (Bob Sweeney) explains to Gracie that Mr. Rodriguez can only extend his visa if he has family in the United States. Gracie says George is her teacher's uncle from Mexico, but never filed any paperwork when he immigrated. Mr. Dalton sets the process in motion to put both George and Mr. Rodriguez in jail for illegal immigration and then deported to Spain. George manages to straighten things out, but Mr. Rodriguez still must leave.
82	30	"Gracie and Cleaning Woman"	Ralph Levy	Sid Dorfman, Harvey Helm, Nate Monaster, Jesse Goldstein, William Burns	April 27, 1953
Verna Felton plays the Burns' cleaning woman Maggie. Gracie misinterprets Maggie's praise of banker Chester Vanderlip (Grandon Rhodes) and his buying a mink stole and a diamond bracelet for his wife, to mean he bought the gifts for Maggie's sister who cooks for the Vanderlips. Gracie believes Vanderlip and Maggie's sister are having an affair. Meanwhile, Harry Morton hopes to get a loan from Vanderlip. George does a monologue about getting and giving loans. Gracie shows up at Mr. Vanderlip's office and tells him off and mentions Morton. Vanderlip gives Harry Morton a black eye. After a conversation with her conscience (voiced by Gracie), Gracie phones Mr. Vanderlip to tell him that his wife is having an affair with Harry Von Zell. Her gossip causes Mrs. Vanderlip (Kay Riehl) to want to file for divorce. Vanderlip gives Harry Von Zell a black eye. Both Mr. and Mrs. Vanderlip show up at the Burns home to show that he bought the fur and bracelet for his wife. Mrs. Vanderlip had given Chester a black eye. Blanche believes George is responsible for all the fighting and gives George two black eyes. Gracie blames the whole confusion on Maggie.
83	31	"Von Zell's Girlfriend Between Trains"	Ralph Levy	Sid Dorfman, Harvey Helm, Nate Monaster, Jesse Goldstein, William Burns	May 4, 1953
George tackles reconciling Gracie's checking account. Meanwhile, Blanche worries that her husband is being bullied by his business partner Casey (Hal March). Harry von Zell is concerned because his ex-girlfriend Dorothy Potter (Ann Doran) is coming for a short visit. He had told Dorothy that he was married. George does a monologue about Gracie's checking account and her budgeting system. Thanks to Gracie, Harry Morton and Casey's partnership might be over. Gracie tries to talk Blanche into posing as Harry Von Zell's wife. Blanche at first declines to help. Gracie tells Dorothy she is von Zell's wife "Mabel", and that they have two sons away at school. Morton and Casey reconcile. Later, Blanche shows up and is about to present herself as Mabel, when George introduces her as his wife. The truth does eventually come out.
84	32	"George Lectures at UCLA"	Ralph Levy	Sid Dorfman, Harvey Helm, Nate Monaster, Jesse Goldstein, William Burns	May 11, 1953
UCLA asks George to talk at the university, which George assumes is for the general student body. George does a monologue about giving a lecture, starting a college and spending time in the fourth grade. George overhears Harry Von Zell and the Mortons laughing about the invitation, and loses his confidence. After consulting with a doctor, Gracie mistakenly believes that if George listens to a lawyer (Carleton Young) and a bricklayer (Buck Young) talk to each other, he will regain his confidence. George still refuses to lecture. After a talk with von Zell and the Morton's, George does decide to lecture. A last minute phone call from UCLA clarifies that they only wanted George to use his influence with Jack Benny and Bob Hope to get them to be guest lecturers. To save face, George makes it look as though UCLA still wanted him. Rolfe Sedan has a recurring role as Mr. Beasley the mailman.
85	33	"Gracie and Harry Morton; Missing Persons Bureau"	Ralph Levy	Sid Dorfman, Harvey Helm, Nate Monaster, Jesse Goldstein, William Burns	May 18, 1953
Harry Morton is late for lunch at home, due to his playing cards at his office. Blanche makes a half-joking remark to Gracie, "For Harry to be late for lunch, he'd have to be kidnapped." Gracie takes her remark seriously, contacting Detective Wilcox (Robert Bray) at the Missing Persons Bureau, as well as getting everybody else worried about Harry. George does a monologue about Harry being missing and being worried about him. Blanche finds Harry at his office, and he takes her out to lunch. Gracie meanwhile poses as Blanche and tries to collect on Harry's insurance policy. Mr. Welbert (Joseph Kearns) of the insurance company, calls Gracie and tells her that Harry isn't missing, but is dining at a restaurant with another woman. Hoping to save Blanche's marriage, Gracie tells Blanche she was with Harry. Don Brodie appears as Casey, Harry's partner.
86	34	"Surprise Party for Mortons; Sanitarium Routine"	Ralph Levy	Sid Dorfman, Harvey Helm, Nate Monaster, Jesse Goldstein, William Burns	July 6, 1953
It is Harry Morton's birthday, and his social club is planning a surprise party. Blanche asks Gracie to wait at her house for a package for Harry. While there, Gracie answers a phone call that leads her to think the party is for George, and she tells him about it. George does a monologue about the surprise party. Gracie mentions the party at her house and Blanche believes it's for Harry. George tries to figure out who's giving him a party. He tells Gracie he's going out for the evening, figuring Gracie will have to tell him who's throwing the party. At the suggestion of Harry von Zell, she arranges for George to be committed to a sanitarium to make sure he is available for the party, but the attendant (Myron Healey) picks up Harry Morton by mistake. Eventually, everyone is back at George's house waiting. A comment from Gracie makes Harry Morton realize that the party was to be for him and that it is at the club. Frank Gerstle appears as Charlie Hawthorne, president of the club.
87	35	"Perry and Pete; Gracie's Cousins; Sneak Thieves"	Ralph Levy	Sid Dorfman, Harvey Helm, Nate Monaster, Jesse Goldstein & William Burns	July 13, 1953
Perry (Peter Leeds) and Pete (Richard Erdman) are thieves who have escaped from prison in New York. They break into the Burns house and Gracie strikes up a conversation with them. George lets them stay in a room over the garage after he mistakes them for Gracie's cousins. George does a monologue about the cousins and other relatives staying with George and Gracie. Blanche introduce Perry and Pete to Harry and they steal his cigarette case. The crooks sell the case to Harry von Zell and Harry Morton sees it and says it's his. The two Harry's and George begin to suspect Perry and Pete are crooks. Loot from their neighborhood burglaries are stashed in the Burns' garage. George calls the police. Detective Roach has a confusing conversation with Gracie. The crooks are caught after Gracie drugs their hot chocolate with sleeping pills.
88	36	"Gracie Doing a Picture Without George"	Ralph Levy	Sid Dorfman, Harvey Helm, Nate Monaster, Jesse Goldstein & William Burns	July 20, 1953
Gracie finds a telegram from 1923, asking George to perform as a solo act in a Broadway show. Gracie does not notice the date on the telegram, and tries to figure out a way to make George feel free to do the show without her. George does a monologue about Gracie maybe wanting to work with someone else. Gracie tells George a confusing story about Sheba the dog hoping George will feel free to go out on his own. Gracie sends herself a telegram that claims Universal wants to do a picture with her and not George. After George reads it, he decides he does not want to stand in Gracie's way. Harry Morton tells George that Gracie sent the telegram. When George confronts Gracie, she says she knows about the telegram he got. George explains to Gracie that it was from 1923.
89	37	"Gracie Trying to Get George to Go on Trip East (some listings title this as Going to New York)"	Ralph Levy	Sid Dorfman, Harvey Helm, Nate Monaster, Jesse Goldstein & William Burns	July 27, 1953
The Mortons plan a road trip to New York with the Forbes couple, but Gracie talks Blanche into taking her and George along instead of the Forbes. George really does not want to go. George does a monologue about taking a road trip with Harry Morton. George finally agrees to go. But, thinking that George doesn't want to go, the Mortons get the Forbes to go again. The Forbes become angry when they are snubbed a second time after the Morton's hear George will go. Gracie offers both the Forbes and Mr. Beasley the mailman, a 2-week use of their pool. Harry Von Zell has a head cold, and Gracie now thinks that George has one too. So, George plays along and cancels the trip with the Mortons. Thinking everyone else will be away, and hoping to have two weeks of quiet, George discovers the Forbes, Mr. Beasley and the Mortons all using the Burns' pool. Dick Elliott appears as Mr. Duffy from the drugstore.
90	38	"Gracie Sees a Hold-Up; Johnny Velvet"	Ralph Levy	Sid Dorfman, Harvey Helm, Nate Monaster, Jesse Goldstein & William Burns	August 3, 1953
Gracie gets a letter informing her that she is scheduled to testify against gangster Johnny Velvet (Sheldon Leonard) as a witness in a bank robbery he committed. Not knowing this, George answers a phone call from Johnny, who says that he and Gracie had better leave. George does a monologue about how the phone call was probably from someone that doesn't want him to sing at the Ronald Reagan dinner at the Friars Club of Beverly Hills and practical jokes. Johnny then kidnaps Gracie. George calls police Detective Benson (George Eldredge). Gracie thoroughly confuses Johnny, so he sends her home, and orders his stooge Lefty (Ben Welden) to kidnap George. Lefty mistakenly kidnaps Harry Von Zell. After letting von Zell go, Lefty mistakenly kidnaps Detective Benson. Lefty then kidnaps Ronald Reagan, who was at the Burn's home hoping to convince George not to sing at the event. Another thug kidnaps Johnny, mistaking him for George. Lefty goes straight and becomes a lilac water salesman, George sings at the dinner but no one showed up. Johnny is sentenced to spends 48 hours with Gracie.
91	39	"George and Gracie Locked Out of Their House"	Ralph Levy	Sid Dorfman, Harvey Helm, Nate Monaster, Jesse Goldstein & William Burns	August 10, 1953
Coming home late at night from a party, Gracie locks herself and George out of their home. George does a monologue about the crazy things Gracie and her family does. George has Harry Morton call for a locksmith. Gracie then locks the Mortons out of their home. Mr. Elliott (Bob Sweeney), the locksmith, gets both doors open. The total charges come to $6, but a confused Gracie writes out a check for $300. While everyone is at the Morton's, Gracie accidentally locks Mr. Elliott's toolbox inside her home. When everyone leaves the Morton house to see what happened, Gracie locks them out of there as well. George breaks a window to get the toolbox. Mr. Elliott's wife is suspicious of the $300 check, and is sure Gracie is having an affair with her husband. Mrs. Elliot confronts Gracie, but George straightens everything out. Just as the Elliot's are leaving, Gracie locks herself and George out of the house again.
92	40	"Gracie at the Department Store"	Ralph Levy	Sid Dorfman, Harvey Helm, Jesse Goldstein & William Burns	August 17, 1953
Gracie snags her foot in a worn department store carpet and falls, ruining her stockings. She thinks she damaged their carpet and will be held financially responsible. The store is trying to compensate her so she does not sue them. They offer her $25, but she believes that is what she has to pay. George does a monologue about how Gracie never ceases to amaze him. Gracie asks Blanche to lend her $25. Blanche asks Harry for the money and Harry then asks George to lend him the $25. Mr. Burke (Lester Matthews), the store's claims adjuster, comes to talk to Gracie. He thinks Gracie is negotiating, and eventually offers her $300 and then $500. The store sends Dr. Wilburn (Grandon Rhodes) to examine her, and they raise their offer to $10,000. Mr. Burke gives George the check and says their doctor will make Gracie normal again. George tears up the check and says he needs Gracie the way she is. Note: Fred Clark's last episode as Harry Morton; Larry Keating assumes the role in the next season.

=== Season 4 (1953–54) ===
Season 4:

No. overall	No. in season	Title	Directed by	Written by	Original release date
93	1	"Morton Buys Iron Deer; Gracie Thinks George Needs Glasses"	Frederick De Cordova	Sid Dorfman, Harvey Helm, Keith Fowler & William Burns	October 5, 1953
Morton buys a $200 iron deer for his lawn. When George says he "can't see it", he is referring to Morton's reasoning for buying the deer, but Gracie thinks George is losing his eyesight. George does a monologue about Harry spending the money for the deer and other people buying antiques. Blanche tells Harry von Zell how unhappy she is about the iron deer. George stops the show to explain how Fred Clark is no longer playing Harry Morton. Morton explains to Blanche why he bought the deer. Harry tells Gracie she should get some insurance on George in case he has an accident. Arthur Stebbins (Pierre Watkin), the insurance man, suggests to Gracie that George see an eye doctor first. Joseph Kearns, who portrayed an unnamed eye doctor in Season 2, returns as Doctor Merkin to examine George's eyes. Doctor Merkin is the one that could use glasses. Note: Actor Larry Keating steps into the role of Certified Public Accountant (CPA) Harry Morton beginning with this episode, and remained through the end of the show in 1958.
94	2	"Gracie Helps Morton Get CPA Account"	Frederick De Cordova	Sid Dorfman, Harvey Helm, Keith Fowler & William Burns	October 12, 1953
Gracie buys a bottle of bourbon because she wants to prepare "stewed" chicken. Bob Hill (Howard McNear), a man from Altoona, Pennsylvania, stops by to deliver a "hello" to George from old friend Dick Cunningham. Gracie tells him to wait in the den. Blanche tells Gracie that Harry is wasting his time trying to get Mr. Kennedy's (Paul Harvey) business. Mr. Kennedy does give Harry his account. Gracie steps in as Harry's "wife" and has a confusing conversation with Mr. Kennedy. Mr. Kennedy is led to believe she is divorcing Harry. Mr. Kennedy now tells Harry he doesn't get the account and Harry thinks Blanche is divorcing him. George does a monologue about Gracie getting Harry in trouble and about people helping one another. Bob Hill is still waiting for George. Harry figures out it was Gracie that started the trouble and wants her to talk to Mr. Kennedy. She gets the live chicken drunk with the bourbon, and it runs amok throughout the neighborhood. Mr. Vanderlip (Grandon Rhodes) comes by George's and asks about the chicken. Bob Hill is still waiting for George. Everything gets straightened out with Mr. Kennedy. Bob Hill finally gets to talk to George.
95	3	"Gracie Gets a Jury Summons"	Frederick De Cordova	Sid Dorfman, Harvey Helm, Keith Fowler & William Burns	October 19, 1953
Gracie gets a summons for jury duty and if she's accepted she could be tied up for 30 days. George wonders what will happen to the show if she's gone that long. Gracie is eager to do her jury duty. George does a monologue about his contributions to the show. Harry Morton criticizes Blanches cooking. Gracie is accepted as a juror. She asks Mr. Marshall (Lester Matthews), a lawyer, over to give her juror lessons. Mr. Beasley the mailman, the Mortons and Harry Von Zell separately visit Judge Cramer (Will Wright) to ask him to keep Gracie off the jury. After the confusing stories he's told and then speaking to Gracie, Judge Cramer tells her no jury duty. Gracie goes to view some court cases. She tells George how she asked questions and made suggestions and how the Judge was constantly banging his little hammer. George, the Mortons and von Zell are called for jury duty.
96	4	"George Teaches Gracie Not to Be Careless"	Frederick De Cordova	Sid Dorfman, Harvey Helm, Keith Fowler & William Burns	October 26, 1953
Gracie is constantly misplacing things. George asks Harry Morton to hide Gracie's watch, to teach her a lesson. After finding the watch in Blanche's sugar bowl, Gracie mistakenly gets the notion that Blanche is a kleptomaniac. George does a monologue about careless people and forgetfulness. Though he doesn't want to get involved, Gracie enlists Harry von Zell to help her prevent Blanche from getting into trouble. Blanche and Harry Morton make fun of each other because she bought two dresses. Blanche can't find the dresses. What she doesn't know is that Gracie wanted to return them to the store because she thinks Blanche stole them. Detective Sawyer (James Flavin) is called in to investigate. Sawyer has a confusing conversation with Gracie. Sawyer tells George that he believes she is a kleptomaniac. George explains to von Zell how he tried to teach Gracie a lesson and Blanche over hears it. Gracie tells George about her experience waiting in line to return the dresses. Everyone tries to straighten things out and Gracie winds up with three watches.
97	5	"George and Harry Mad at Each Other"	Frederick De Cordova	Sid Dorfman, Harvey Helm, Keith Fowler & William Burns	November 2, 1953
Gracie overhears George and Harry Morton, and believes they are having a feud. In fact, both men are upset about a mutual acquaintance they have been discussing. In the discombobulation, Gracie repeats to Blanche what she believes she overheard, causing a series of events that has everybody upset with each other. George does a monologue about problems with neighbors. To patch up their friendship, Gracie decides to turn George and Harry both against Harry von Zell. She hopes the two will be madder at von Zell than each other. George and Morton make up briefly, but then a mistake causes another falling out. Thinking George and Morton have nothing in common, Gracie tries to get George into Morton's CPA Club. Gracie invites Mr. Stoneham (Walter Woolf King), President of the CPA Club, over to the house. After a confusing conversation, Mr. Stoneham says there's not an opening for George. Gracie tells George about her trip to the dentist. Morton brings George some cigars and everyone becomes friends again.
98	6	"Gracie Gets a Business Manager"	Frederick De Cordova	Sid Dorfman, Harvey Helm, Keith Fowler & William Burns	November 9, 1953
George tells Gracie she spends too much money and she is over budget. Harry Morton recommends San Francisco business manager Roger Graham (Johnstone White) to help Gracie. Gracie calls Roger and asks him to come over. George does a monologue about actors needing business managers and a manager he had named Leo. Gracie talks to mailman Mr. Beasley about his daughter having a baby and thinks her mother is having the baby. Gracie mistakes Joe Hardy (Joseph Kearns), a man who cut the Morton's lawn, for Graham. She has a confusing conversation with Mr. Hardy, offers to let him stay at the house and makes him lunch. When George meets him, Hardy pretends to be Graham. Gracie talks to George about all the places they'll go to with the money Graham will save them. When the real Mr. Graham shows up, the usual confusion ensues. Things finally get straightened out.
99	7	"Raccoon Coat Story"	Frederick De Cordova	Sid Dorfman, Harvey Helm, Keith Fowler & William Burns	November 16, 1953
Harry von Zell tells Gracie about the blind date he went on and Gracie thinks he's going to get married. Blanche Morton gives her husband Harry's raccoon coat to Harry Von Zell, to hang in the Burns' closet. Blanche wants to see if Harry will even miss it. He does. George does a monologue about things people collect. Gracie later assumes she has found a coat from George's vaudeville days, and gives it away to her gardener Mr. Miller (Syd Saylor). When she discovers her error, she tries to find a replacement, borrowing one from UCLA Professor Hopkins (Lester Matthews). Her friend Jane (Elvia Allman) finds the professor's coat in the closet, and gives it also to the gardener, thinking Gracie forgot to do that. Gracie tells George about her trip to UCLA. Both Morton and Professor Hopkins come to collect their coats. Mr. Miller ends up returning both coats, because he has no need for them.
100	8	"Gracie Thinks Harry Von Zell is Broke"	Frederick De Cordova	Sid Dorfman, Harvey Helm, Keith Fowler & William Burns	November 23, 1953
Harry Von Zell borrows $50 from George. George asks Harry to take his suit to the tailor. Gracie runs into him, hears about the money and sees he is also carrying George's suit. She jumps to the conclusion that von Zell is financially destitute. Gracie calls Mr. Mitchell (John Gallaudet) from the state welfare department, mis-representing herself as von Zell's wife. George does a monologue about people borrowing money from him. Blanche talks to Harry Morton about von Zell being broke. Gracie tells a surprised George that von Zell is broke. Harry von Zell overhears part of the conversation and thinks it's Morton that is broke. Mr. Mitchell from the welfare office visit the Burns' luxurious house, and accuses her of fraud. George arranges a benefit for von Zell. Gracie tells George about what happened when she tried to sell the tickets. Harry Morton and Harry Von Zell visit George to complain about his starting rumors that they are broke.
101	9	"Gracie Going to San Francisco"	Frederick De Cordova	Sid Dorfman, Harvey Helm, Keith Fowler & William Burns	November 30, 1953
Blanche helps Gracie prepare to visit to Gracie's family in San Francisco. George does a monologue about when wives are away, the husbands get out their little black book. Chester Vanderlip comes by to go over some of Gracie's confusing checks. Blanche keeps bothering Harry while he's working on a new account. Blanche decides to go with Gracie on her trip. Verna Felton appears as housekeeper Mrs. Evans, hired to take care of things while Gracie is gone. Gracie and Mrs. Evans have a confusing conversation about her duties. Mrs. Evans sings harmony with George and Harry Von Zell. Gracie tells George about her experience at the ticket office. As Blanche and Gracie are ready to leave, Gracie remembers her mother is coming to Beverly Hills for a visit. George and Morton plan to live it up while the wives are gone, but then decide to go to San Francisco to meet their wives. George finds out that Gracie's mother is arriving.
102	10	"Gracie Thinks George is Retiring from Show Business"	Frederick De Cordova	Sid Dorfman, Harvey Helm, Keith Fowler & William Burns	December 7, 1953
Gracie overhears George on the telephone refusing to do a show with Jack Benny, after Benny has criticized George's singing. George tells him to have the network tear up the contract for that show. Gracie believes she heard George mean he is quitting show business. After Blanche tells Harry von Zell about George retiring, he tears up his own contract with George, so as not to stand in George's way. George does a monologue about people retiring and how he won't retire. Harry Morton talks to Blanche about what he would do when he retires. Gracie signs a contract to swap their Beverly Hills home for a mountain cabin owned by Chuck and Mabel Fuller (Will Wright and Mabel Albertson) so George will have a place to do things. Gracie finds out that George is not retiring and von Zell suggests that she talk to his lawyer friend Larry Heath (Frank Wilcox) about the cabin contract. Gracie tries to talk George into moving to a mountain cabin. The Fullers come by and Gracie tries to pass Blanche off as Mrs. Burns and she as her nurse. George gets the Fullers to tear up the contract by acting more crazy than Gracie.
103	11	"George and Gracie Going to Rose Marie Premiere"	Frederick De Cordova	Sid Dorfman, Harvey Helm, Keith Fowler & William Burns	December 14, 1953
George and Gracie have four tickets to attend a studio premiere, followed by dinner at Romanoff's restaurant in Beverly Hills. Apparently the tickets are very hard to come by. George says they'll have to ask someone to go with them. Gracie brings two tickets over to Blanche. Not knowing what Gracie did, George then gives two tickets to Harry von Zell. George does a monologue about looking forward to the premiere and about Romanoff's. Harry Morton tells Blanche he'd rather stay home and read a book. Blanche flatters Harry into going. George is sent four more tickets. Gracie gives two tickets to Mailman Beasley and then brings two to Chester Vanderlip. Gracie tells George about the people she met at the bank. Everyone meets at George's house to leave for the premiere and George realizes there is no ticket for him.
104	12	"Problem Husbands"	Frederick De Cordova	Sid Dorfman, Harvey Helm, Keith Fowler & William Burns	December 21, 1953
Veteran actress Elvia Allman appears as Gracie's wardrobe woman Jane, whose husband is insecure because she makes more money than he does. When Gracie starts to meddle in Jane's business, Harry Von Zell advises her to stay out of it, because she does not make more money than George and could not possibly understand Jane's situation. Gracie decides to get a job. George does a monologue about Jane and Gracie whispering and secrets. In explaining it to Blanche Morton, without mentioning Jane's name, Gracie leaves the erroneous impression that she is getting a job because George has another woman. Gracie has a confusing conversation with a booking agent (Peter Leeds). George learns that Gracie has been trying to book a job without him. Blanche tries to tell Gracie that George may be seeing other women. Jane tells Gracie that she is leaving her husband. Gracie tells George she is leaving him so she and Jane can go into business together, with George taking it all in stride. Jane explains she and her husband have straightened things out... but not before Harry Von Zell cross-dresses as a woman.
105	13	"Gracie's Anniversary Present"	Frederick De Cordova	Sid Dorfman, Harvey Helm, Keith Fowler & William Burns	December 28, 1953
Gracie and Blanche try to find out what George is getting Gracie for their anniversary. Gracie overhears George order a carpenter's plane from a hardware store, but believes he is buying an airplane for their wedding anniversary. George does a monologue about Gracie not being too subtle and her hinting for things. Gracie arranges for flying lessons with instructor Duffy Edwards (Richard Erdman). He recommends that she have a doctor examine her and George first to make sure they are fit for a flying license. Dr. Lucas (Dan Tobin) comes by. Gracie tells him to examine George, but not let him know what it's for. The doctor tells George what has been going on. In response, George plans a ceremony with their friends to unveil the carpenter's plane. Gracie and George reminisce about her favorite anniversary, held at the San Francisco home of her mother, who had invited all of Gracie's old boyfriends. Gracie orders a real plane for George.
106	14	"Uncle Harvey's Invention"	Frederick De Cordova	Sid Dorfman, Harvey Helm, Keith Fowler & William Burns	January 4, 1954
Gracie's Uncle Harvey sends his plant food to her. She gives a can of it to Harry Von Zell, who says it is labeled "highly flammable, keep away from fires". George replaces some dead flowers in a vase with new ones sent by a Mr. Palmer. Blanche and Gracie see the new flowers and believe it's because of the plant food. George does a monologue about Uncle Harvey's inventions and other inventors. Gracie plants a small orange tree and douses it with the plant food. By coincidence, and unaware of what Gracie has done, George later has Mr. Miller (Syd Saylor), the gardener, replace the small tree with a fully-grown and blossoming orange tree. Gracie and the Mortons believe the plant food caused the small orange tree to grow rapidly. Mr. Vanderlip is somewhat interested when Gracie and Harry Morton ask for a loan to market the formula. He sends Mr. Tully (Byron Foulger), a chemist, to analyze the formula. Gracie has a confusing conversation with Mr. Tully. Gracie and George talk about the people she met at the bank. Eventually, the Burnses, the Mortons and Mr. Vanderlip are in the Burnses living room awaiting the chemist 's analysis results, all wanting a financial stake if the formula is legitimate. Mr. Tully stops by with his analysis, saying the formula is nothing but a martini without the olives.
107	15	"George Reading Play to Be Done in London"	Frederick De Cordova	Sid Dorfman, Harvey Helm, Keith Fowler & William Burns	January 11, 1954
George is trying to read a play that he may be in and it will open in London. George wants to finish reading it before a Mr. Petrie (Reginald Denny) comes by to see if George likes it. Harry Morton is upset with Blanche for not making his breakfast and not giving him a phone message. George does a monologue about performing in London. Blanche moves in with George and Gracie. Mr. Gill (Frank Wilcox), the census taker, is so confused by Gracie that he decides to not count their house and just moves on to the next house. Harry von Zell suggests to Gracie that they try the jealousy routine to get the Morton's back together. They want George to tell Morton that there is a man after Blanche. George tells Morton about the plan. Gracie thinks "tea and crumpets" refers to a couple named Crumpet. Mr. Petrie comes by and while Gracie gets George, he talks to Blanche. Morton comes by pretending to be jealous and chases off Mr. Petrie. George straightens things out with Mr. Petrie and he is to come to dinner. Gracie tells George about the people she met in an elevator. After dinner, Morton apologizes to Mr. Petrie.
108	16	"Gracie Helps Mechanic with Girlfriend"	Frederick De Cordova	Sid Dorfman, Harvey Helm, Keith Fowler & William Burns	January 18, 1954
Auto mechanic Mike Bruce (David Bruce) bemoans the celebrity fixation of his girlfriend Fran (Joanne Jordan). Gracie tells Mike that she will try to cure Fran of that by fabricating fantastical tales of spousal abuse and cruelty at the hands of George. George does a monologue about an interview he's going to give and the things he'll discuss. In a case of mistaken identity, Gracie tells her lies to Alice Rogers (Joan Banks), a reporter sent to interview George. Gracie's interview makes the front page of the afternoon newspaper, shocking the Mortons. Fran comes by and Gracie thinks she is the reporter. She tells Fran how great George is. When Gracie realizes what she did, she goes to the newspaper and arranges another interview with George. Gracie tells George about her experience at the newspaper. George mistakes Mike's boss, Bill Gibson (Alan Dexter), for the editor of the newspaper and starts to give the interview. George finds out his mistake and Bill leaves confused. Mr. Wilson, the editor from the paper, arrives and Gracie sends him away.
109	17	"Gracie Discovers George's Secret Weakness"	Frederick De Cordova	Sid Dorfman, Harvey Helm, Keith Fowler & William Burns	January 25, 1954
Harry von Zell tells Gracie about an article which claims one in five husbands has a secret vice. Gracie asks Jane if her husband has a secret vice. George does a monologue about the first time he met Gracie and another vaudeville act he remembers. Gracie asks Mr. Beasley if he has a secret weakness. She then asks Harry Morton. Morton shows Blanche some of the artistic photos he has taken. Meanwhile, Mr. Vanderlip tries to straighten out Gracie's bank account. Gracie asks Vanderlip if he has a vice. She concludes George is the one with the vice. George tells Morton that they have to get out of taking their wives to the movies because von Zell has tickets to the fights. George lies and says the men want to play cards and that the women should go to the movies by themselves. Gracie says that cards must be George's vice. In order to convince the women, George and Harry von Zell invent the game of Kleebob on the spot. Gracie however, catches on and says Kleebob is played exactly like a game George once taught her when he wanted to go to a baseball game (refer to Season1, Episode 1). They wind up going to the movies. Note: George and Gracie perform their famous "Lamb Chops" act, a skit which brought them fame when they started out in the 1920s.
110	18	"Gracie Has to Sell George's Car by Five O'Clock"	Frederick De Cordova	Sid Dorfman, Harvey Helm, Keith Fowler & William Burns	February 1, 1954
Gracie confuses Fire Inspector Degenkolb's (Tyler McVey) order to remove trash, to mean that she needs to get rid of the family's automobile. And she needs to do it by 5pm or face a possible fine. George does a monologue about Al Simon (Lyle Talbot), his Production Manager, and all the things that need to be done for the show. Her efforts to unload the auto, leads everyone to believe Gracie is trying to fence stolen property. George tells his mechanic he can come by and pick up George's car for service. Lieutenant Andrews (Anthony Warde) speaks to Gracie about the stolen car which is no longer there. Andrews has a very confusing conversation with Gracie. Gracie tells George about the people she met while looking for Harry von Zell at the Guaranteed Building. Lieutenant Andrews returns and speaks to a confused George, who knows nothing about a stolen car. Degenkolb comes back and gives George a citation.
111	19	"Gracie Wins a Television Set"	Frederick De Cordova	Sid Dorfman, Harvey Helm, Keith Fowler & William Burns	February 8, 1954
George and Harry Von Zell want to go to the Friar's club to play cards, but don't want Harry Morton along. The Willis Quiz Show telephones Gracie offering a 27-inch television if she can answer their quiz question about the date of birth of President Woodrow Wilson. She does not know the answer, but later looks up the information and phones the television store, believing she is a winner. George does a monologue about Morton being a little "square" and other "square" people. After Gracie goes to the store to pick up the television set, she wears out department managers with her insistence that she won. Gracie tells Mr. Beasley that his daughter can have her old TV. The department store tries reasoning with George, who believes it is easier for him to just pay for the television set and let Gracie believe she won it. The store tells George that if there are any problems, he will be responsible. Blanche, Morton and von Zell see Gracie with the new set. Gracie tells her story to all the members of her Beverly Hills Uplift Society. Gracie and George talk about her club meeting and the lecture that was given. The club members all go to the store and claim a prize. The store delivers all the televisions, and makes George pay for them. Harry Antrim appears as J.J. Willis. Robert Hutton appears as Paul Willis.
112	20	"No Fan Mail for George"	Frederick De Cordova	Sid Dorfman, Harvey Helm, Keith Fowler & William Burns	February 15, 1954
Gracie and Harry Von Zell got fan letters but George did not. Gracie believes he is upset about not receiving fan mail, and has Blanche Morton write a fake fan letter. Blanche makes a mistake on the letter, crumples it up and tosses it aside. Her husband Harry finds the unsigned letter and recognizes her handwriting. George does a monologue about getting fan mail. Blanche writes another letter and signs it "Violet McGonagall", who is a real person listed in the phone book. George phones Violet (Barbara Pepper) and sings to her, while her husband Fred (Ferris Taylor) listens in. Violet turns up at the Burns house to warn Gracie that Fred wants to shoot George. Harry von Zell tells Blanche that Morton is upset about the letter he found. Blanche decides to have some fun with her husband, but now he seems unconcerned about the letter. Gracie tells George about her trip to the police station. Fred McGonagall shows up to shoot George, but finds the two Harrys and George there. Not knowing which one is George, Fred has the Harrys sing for him. Just as he is about to have George sing, he mistakes the howling of a dog for George and leaves to find the dog.
113	21	"George and Gracie Going to Opera Carmen"	Frederick De Cordova	Sid Dorfman, Harvey Helm, Keith Fowler & William Burns	February 22, 1954
Mr. Vanderlip goes over some of Gracie's checks with her. Everyone is elated when Mr. Vanderlip invites them to see American mezzo-soprano Risë Stevens perform in the opera Carmen. Everyone except for George, who's adamant about seeing a 3-D movie instead. George does a monologue about liking good music and seeing an opera. Harry Morton looks forward to going to the opera, until Blanche says they are going with Gracie. But, then he thinks it would be preferable to spending the evening alone at home with Blanche. Gracie brings in Mr. Hamill (Olan Soule), a tailor, to measure George for a formal suit without him knowing it. Gracie tells George he is being measured for 3-D glasses for the movie. Mrs. Quigley (Isabel Randolph), a music critic, comes by to give Gracie the tickets to the opera. Gracie has a confusing conversation with Mrs. Quigley about her work and the opera Carmen. Morton and von Zell separately try to talk George into going to the opera with no luck. George eventually goes because he likes how he looks in the new suit. After the opera, everyone comes back to George's house. There Mrs. Quigley talks about one of George's shows that didn't have an ending.
114	22	"Harry Morton Is Missing"	Frederick De Cordova	Sid Dorfman, Harvey Helm, Keith Fowler & William Burns	March 1, 1954
Gracie and Blanche attend a movie, while Harry Morton goes to see one of his clients. Harry's car dies and he walks back to his house. When the women return, Blanche cannot find Harry. George does a monologue about times Harry Morton stayed out late and about stories the boys at the club told. George finds Morton's empty car parked on the street. Harry Von Zell hires Detective Jim Bradshaw (Anthony Warde) who mistakes Gracie for Blanche. Gracie lets the detective believe she is Blanche, and the usual confusion arises. Blanche eventually finds her husband was asleep in his own bed all along. The next day Harry and Blanche have lunch at the Brown Derby restaurant. The detective sees them at the restaurant and, believing Gracie is the real Blanche, tells Gracie that Morton was with another woman. Gracie dismisses Detective Bradshaw with a check on which she forged Blanche's signature. Believing Blanche and Harry are having marital problems, Gracie hires Dr. Carruthers (Frank Wilcox), a relationship counselor, to visit the Mortons. Bradshaw returns when the bank will not cash the check, and is confused when he sees Gracie kissing George. The Morton's show up and Bradshaw is even more confused.
115	23	"Gracie Goes to Psychiatrist for Blanche's Dream"	Frederick De Cordova	Sid Dorfman, Harvey Helm, Keith Fowler & William Burns	March 8, 1954
Blanche Morton has a strange dream about husband Harry for 5 nights in a row. She first makes a doctor's appointment to discuss it, but then decides she really does not want to know. George does a monologue about Gracie having her dream analyzed. Gracie keeps Blanche's appointment but under her own name. After describing the dream, Dr. Lowery (Frank Wilcox) tells her it is nothing to worry about. However, the longer Gracie talks, the more concerned the doctor is about her nuttiness, especially when she starts talking about her family. Miss Wilhardt (Sandra Burns) the receptionist, however, shows the booking under Blanche's name, and telephones Harry when the doctor becomes alarmed. The doctor tells Harry that his wife is unbalanced and must be carefully watched. Blanche and George become convinced it is Harry who is unbalanced. Gracie tells George about her cab ride coming back from the doctor. Blanche finds out why Harry was acting the way he was and her and Gracie have a big laugh over it. Because Harry thought Blanche was crazy, he buys her a new bracelet. Gracie acts crazy in front of George hoping to get the same.
116	24	"Gracie's Old Boyfriend, Dan Conroy, Comes to Town"	Frederick De Cordova	Sid Dorfman, Harvey Helm, Keith Fowler & William Burns	March 15, 1954
Ted de Corsia appears as athletic coach Dan Conroy, Gracie's fiancee before she met George. Dan is to stay with the Burns' for a while. Harry von Zell tells Gracie that if George had actually won some trophies, he'd have something to talk to Dan about. George does a monologue about Dan Conroy and strong guys with muscles. In an effort to impress Conroy that she married well, Gracie takes Harry Morton's old athletic trophies and puts them in her home, trying to pass them off as George's trophies. Two of Dan's basketball players, Herb and John (John Smith) have a confusing conversation with Gracie after bringing Dan's luggage. George thinks the trophies are Conroy's, so he puts them in Conroy's luggage. Seeing the trophies in Dan's luggage, Gracie thinks Dan stole them. She removes Harry's trophies from the luggage to return to Blanche. Believing that Dan is broke, Gracie replaces the trophies with the Burns' silverware. George tells Gracie the mistake he made with the trophies. She can't bring herself to tell George about the silverware. Conroy and Harry Morton get long so well talking about their sports interests, that George gets relegated to the background. Gracie makes Harry Von Zell the scapegoat for the silverware.
117	25	"The Old Grads"	Frederick De Cordova	Sid Dorfman, Harvey Helm, Keith Fowler & William Burns	March 22, 1954
George is discussing costs with his production manager Al Simon (Lyle Talbot). Gracie tells George that she got a $2 traffic ticket. The subject of college comes up and George jokes that he would've liked to have been a college man. Al takes Gracie's ticket and says he'll have it fixed, while George just wants him to pay it. Gracie decides to enroll George in college. George does a monologue about going to school and college. Gracie speaks to Mr. Evans (Howard Wendell) at the college and he suggests George get a tutor. Gracie tries to get Mr. Buzby (Veteran British actor Lester Matthews) to tutor George without him knowing it. Meanwhile, Al frantically searches for someone who can get Gracie out of the ticket. Gracie tells George about her experience at the college malt shop. Al obviously asks the wrong person to fix the ticket because George somehow winds up behinds bars.
118	26	"Columbia Pictures Doing Burns and Allen Story"	Frederick De Cordova	Sid Dorfman, Harvey Helm, Keith Fowler & William Burns	March 29, 1954
Gracie tells butcher Mr. Meyers (Nestor Paiva) that Columbia is doing a film about her and George. Gracie then has a confusing conversation with Mrs. Hudson (Fay Baker) about the film. George does a monologue about making the film interesting and his early life. Harry Morton wants to be George's financial advisor for the production. Gracie speaks with Columbia producer Fred Kohlmar (Dan Tobin) until George shows up. Writers for the movie, Casey (John Gallaudet) and Wells (Herb Ellis), come by to interview Gracie with the usual confusion. George's friends are all giving him gifts in hopes of being involved in the movie. Mr. Meyers sends his daughter Lyly to deliver Gracie's meat purchase to George, and she does a cartwheel before leaving. Because of something Harry von Zell said, Gracie believes George has a wife and four sons in San Diego. In response, Gracie gets Columbia to cancel the picture. George asks Gracie why she called off the picture and he straightens things out over the other wife. George's friends come by to get their gifts back.
119	27	"An Elephant Sits on Gracie's Fender"	Frederick De Cordova	Sid Dorfman, Harvey Helm, Keith Fowler & William Burns	April 5, 1954
On a shopping trip, Gracie stops to watch a circus erect a tent, and an elephant sits on her car and dents it. Nobody believes her, except for Dave the mechanic who witnessed the incident. George doesn't believe Gracie. George does a monologue about not having to lie to each other and women trying to deceive their husbands. Harry von Zell wants a raise and George turns him down. P. T. Prescott (Douglas Fowley), claims adjuster for the circus, speaks to Gracie and offers to pay for the damages. George thinks Prescott is an actor and tears up the check he gave to Gracie. George tells Gracie not to tell the insurance man the elephant story. So, when insurance adjuster Arthur Stebbens (Bill Kennedy) shows up, Gracie uses Harry Von Zell's recent car accident to file her report. When Stebbens presses her for the truth, and she tells him, he cancels her insurance contract and von Zell's insurance. George offers to buy Gracie a mink if she tells him the truth about the accident. When George gets Prescott and the others together in one room, they finally believe Gracie. George E. Stone appears as Duffy Edwards the Furrier.
120	28	"George Gets Black Eye from Open Door"	Frederick De Cordova	Sid Dorfman, Harvey Helm, Keith Fowler & William Burns	April 12, 1954
George has a black eye from an accident with a door. Everyone believes that George and Al Simon are quarreling. Al's brother Tom Simon broke his leg from a skiing mishap. Al had recently put Tom on George's payroll. Harry von Zell wants George to meet contortionist Eloise as she would like to get into show business. George does a monologue about how people don't believe the truth and how he can't fire Al. Insurance investigator Mr. Otis (John Hoyt) comes by to speak to George about Tom. George isn't around, so Gracie speaks to him. When Mr. Otis mentions that Mr. Simon broke his leg, Gracie thinks he's talking about Al and that George and Al had a brawl. A confused Mr. Otis thinks George put in a fraudulent claim. Harry Morton has a new found respect for George, believing him to be quite the fighter. While Blanche is telling off George, von Zell brings by Eloise. Gracie prevents Mr. Otis from speaking to Mr. Simon at the hospital. George tries to explain to Gracie that it wasn't Al but his brother Tom that was hurt. George and Mr. Otis are trying to straighten things out. Harry von Zell brings by Mr. Parker, Eloise's grandfather, who is also a contortionist. Adrienne Marden appears as a nurse.
121	29	"Dolores De Marco, George's Ex-Vaudeville Partner"	Frederick De Cordova	Sid Dorfman, Harvey Helm, Keith Fowler & William Burns	April 19, 1954
To avoid what he believes might be a lawsuit, George dodges Daryl Dittenfest (Ross Elliott). George gets a letter saying that his old girlfriend Dolores De Marco's (Argentina Brunetti) daughter is coming to visit. Her name is Dolores as well. Gracie is beside herself with jealousy when she thinks that ex-girlfriend Dolores is coming to visit. George does a monologue about people suing him. Daughter Dolores (Actress Charlita) arrives and Gracie thinks she is the mother. Meanwhile, Daryl is patiently waiting on the front porch. Dolores leaves when George isn't there. Blanche talks to Chester Vanderlip about George marrying on the rebound. Gracie hires child actors Bonny (Sharon Baird) and Harold (Lee Aaker) to pretend that they are George's children. Gracie wants Delores to think that George has a happy family. Delores comes back and Daryl is still on the porch. The children mistake several different men for George. Everything gets straightened out when Dolores shows up a third time with her mother. It turns out that Dittenfest did not want to sue George, but to thank him for using his name on George's show.
122	30	"Vanderlip Buys Black Negligee for His Wife"	Frederick De Cordova	Sid Dorfman, Harvey Helm, Keith Fowler & William Burns	April 26, 1954
Gracie and Blanche are at the dentists office where Gracie annoys a man (Herb Vigran) also waiting there. Chester Vanderlip stops by to discuss Gracie's checks with George. While there, he uses their telephone to call professional shopping assistant Mary Delaney (Mary Ellen Kay) about a gift for his wife Lucille (Sarah Selby). Gracie snoops in on an extension telephone and believes he is cheating on his wife. George does a monologue about Vanderlip being bashful and other kinds of weaknesses. Gracie tries to make Vanderlip jealous by telling him that the Dentist is in love with Lucille. George tries to straighten it out by showing Mary's business card to Gracie. She responds by telephoning Mary and tells her that her boyfriend Charles Banks (Joel Marston) is married. George tells Chester and Lucille what Gracie thought. Mr. Banks shows up at the Burns home to talk to Gracie. Gracie tells him about Chester and he goes over to confront Vanderlip. Now Lucille thinks Chester was seeing Mary. Once again, George has to make everyone happy.
123	31	"Gracie and George Have a Mystery Anniversary"	Frederick De Cordova	Sid Dorfman, Harvey Helm, Keith Fowler & William Burns	May 3, 1954
Gracie and Blanche have an amusing time with the Counterman at a lunch counter. Harry Von Zell absent-mindedly leaves a wrapped gift for "Howard Richards' wife" in the Burns home, after using their telephone. Blanche and Gracie find it, and they believe it was a surprise gift from George. They do not want George to know Gracie does not remember what the occasion could be. Blanche and Gracie go out to buy a present for George. George does a monologue about finding out about a party Gracie's planning and surprises. Gracie hires Mrs. Bellows (Kathryn Card) to cook for the occasion. Mrs. Bellows mistakes George, then von Zell for the butler. George makes a bet with Gracie that she does not know what they are celebrating, so she hums, "Happy hmm hmm to you", and claims it is the ninth anniversary of the event. Everyone at the party asks Dobson the butler what the occasion is, but he also does not know. Everytime George tries to sing a song, someone throws confetti at him. Harry Morton arrives from Boston. When George hands Gracie a gift, she asks where the other gift was. Harry Von Zell tells her the other gift was a birthday gift for "Howard Richards' wife" that he accidentally left there. Everyone sings happy birthday to "Howard Richards' wife" even though she isn't there. Lois January appears as Harry's Date. George Eldredge appears as a Party Guest. Note: Similar plot line and story as season 1, Episode 8, "Happy Hmm Hmm".
124	32	"George Resting for Insurance Examination"	Frederick De Cordova	Sid Dorfman, Harvey Helm, Keith Fowler & William Burns	May 10, 1954
Gracie causes some confusion at a drug store by tying up all the pay phones and giving advice to some of the customers. George wants to get a full day's rest before his Insurance Examination. Blanche tells Harry that Gracie would like him to disconnect the doorbell to keep things quiet for George. Gracie leaves the phone off the hook. George does a monologue about his examination and how he could use the rest anyway. He also talk about his experience at the drug store. Harry comes over to work on the doorbell, but winds up messing up the wiring. The doorbell constantly ringing and Gracie and Blanche yelling keep disturbing George. As George lies in his own bed, the room becomes a parade of people who need access to the roof, through the window next to his bed. They include Mr. Riley (Alan Dexter) the Telephone Repairman, an electrician, roof repairman (Mitchell Kowal) and a TV aerial repairman. Even Harry von Zell disturbs George by acting out a role he is to play. Even with no rest, George passes the exam. Doris Packer appears as a woman who needs to use a pay phone. Howard Wendell appears as The Druggist.
125	33	"One Week to Live"	Frederick De Cordova	Sid Dorfman, Harvey Helm, Keith Fowler & William Burns	July 5, 1954
Harry Morton is speaking at a farewell event, and asks George for help to write his speech. Because of something that Harry von Zell says, Gracie believes Morton only has a week to live. She writes her mother to tell her the news. George does a monologue about writers. Gracie also tells the sad news to mail carrier Mr. Beasley, who gives Morton a farewell handshake when he delivers the mail. After talking to Gracie, Blanche and Harry believe it is George who only has a week to live. Mr. Beasley also tells George that Harry Morton is dying. George and Morton confront each other, but neither can actually bring up the subject. Henry Mills (Frank Wilcox), a tax assessor, comes by and speaks with Gracie. They have a confusing conversation about home improvements. Gracie and George talk about her Aunt Clara and her 9 husbands. Harry von Zell eventually straightens everything out and Gracie and George do a dance.
126	34	"Gracie Buys Old Movies to Sell to Television"	Frederick De Cordova	Sid Dorfman, Harvey Helm, Keith Fowler & William Burns	July 12, 1954
After Harry Von Zell and Harry Morton urge George to buy the rights to some old films, he passes on the opportunity. Gracie spends $20,000 to buy the movies for George, after being approached by fortune teller Professor Como (Robert Cornthwaite) in a restaurant. George does a monologue about von Zell and Morton wanting to invest in the films and things people try to sell you. Morton and von Zell are incensed George talked them out of it. Gracie speaks to Professor Como and he tells her it's a bad day to make any deals. Mr. Dykes (Douglass Dumbrille), a lawyer, tells von Zell and Blanche that he'll pretend to represent an investment syndicate, and offer George $50,000 for the films. Then he'll know how much to sue George for. Mr. Dykes speaks with George and George likes the offer. Not knowing Gracie bought the films, George calls Mr. Stevens, the man with the movies, and makes a deal to get the movies back. George tells Mr. Dykes he has a deal. Gracie sells the films back to Mr. Stevens for the same amount of money she invested. In the end, everyone is glad they didn't invest in the films. Sandra Burns appears as an unnamed woman in a restaurant. Barbara Knudson as Gladys.
127	35	"Emily Vanderlip's Elopement"	Frederick De Cordova	Sid Dorfman, Harvey Helm, Keith Fowler & William Burns	July 19, 1954
Gracie has a confusing conversation with Mrs. Reilly (Doris Packer) in a shoe store. Emily Vanderlip (Millie Doff) comes to the store and speaks with Gracie. Neither Emily nor her boyfriend Donald Calhoun (Richard H. Bauman) want to marry before they finish school. But Gracie believes they are going to elope. George does a monologue about elopements. Blanche and Harry Morton talk about when they got married. In a plan gone wrong, Gracie decides to help by using reverse psychology on the couple, encouraging them to elope. Just to get out of the conversation, Emily and Donald say they will elope and leave. In another attempt to scare them, Gracie tells Harry von Zell to place a ladder under Emily's window. Harry is caught by a policeman (Robert Foulk), who believes he was trying to break into the home. Harry is taken into police custody. When Lucille (Sarah Selby) sees the ladder, she believes the couple has eloped and tells Gracie and Blanche. But, Emily and Donald come by and explain that they are not married. John Gallaudet appears as the shoe salesman.
128	36	"Gracie Runs for City Council"	Frederick De Cordova	Sid Dorfman, Harvey Helm, Keith Fowler & William Burns	July 26, 1954
Mrs. Reeves (Isabel Randolph), president of the Beverly Hills League of Women Voters, asks for Gracie's support in the upcoming city council election. Gracie mistakenly thinks she is being asked to run for the office herself. George does a monologue about Gracie in the Council, women in politics and George helping a politician. Harry von Zell comes into George's den dressed as a toreador for a part he's playing. Gracie goes door-to-door campaigning, and gives George her accounts of her experiences on the Beverly Hills campaign trail. Harry Morton refers her to his press agent friend Charles Lowe (Douglas Fowley) to be her campaign manager. Gracie would like her picture in the paper. Charles makes a suggestion that the picture be of her breaking up a gambling table. Gracie rents some gambling equipment and stores it in the house. In her visit to Beverly Hills Police Chief Rogers (Joseph Crehan), she leaves the impression that there is a gambling den going on in the Burns house. George is arrested when the police find the equipment, but eventually straightens everything out. Gracie drops out of the race. Martha Wentworth appears as Mrs. Gilbert. Note: Marion Ross, who appears as Dixie the manicurist, became a household name 20 years later, as matriarch Marion Cunningham in eleven seasons the TV sitcom Happy Days.
129	37	"Burnses and Mortons Choosing Movie to Attend"	Frederick De Cordova	Sid Dorfman, Harvey Helm, Keith Fowler & William Burns	August 2, 1954
Gracie causes confusion at the local Post Office when she tries to mail a birthday present to her sister Hazel. George does a monologue about women never revealing their true age and people telling lies. George is supposed to work that night, but Gracie wants to go to a movie instead. George calls his production manager Al Simon and tells him he is sick. Harry Morton insults Blanche's cooking and tells her he doesn't want to sit next to Gracie at the movie. The Morton's and the Burns' try to choose a movie that has not been seen by anyone in the group. They decide on a film. Harry von Zell comes by to see how George is feeling and will go along to see the movie, but he's seen the one they picked. After they pick another movie, Al Simon comes by. Pretending George is still sick, Gracie calls Dr. Ferguson (Raymond Greenleaf). Al decides to go to the movie as well and they have to pick another film. The group finally decide on a film to see. Just as they are leaving, Dr. Ferguson drops by and describes a great film he has seen. Turns out that was the film the group was going to see. Phillips Tead appears as the Postal Clerk. William Bryant as Man in Postal Line.
130	38	"Gracie Buys a Toaster Wholesale"	Frederick De Cordova	Sid Dorfman, Harvey Helm, Keith Fowler & William Burns	August 9, 1954
Gracie causes some confusion at the tailor shop where George is being fitted for some suits. Gracie needs a new toaster and George knows a place he can take her. George does a monologue about women always picking clothes for men. George drops Gracie off at the appliance store. When Gracie realizes how much money she thinks she can save by buying wholesale, she orders a full room of kitchen appliances for herself. Blanche wants a toaster as well. Blanche calls the store and asks Gracie to get her the same thing that she is buying. So Gracie duplicates her order for Blanche. After the huge order arrives, a policeman (Robert Foulk) threatens to give George a ticket because all the items are blocking the sidewalk. Gracie says that if the policeman can give tickets to someone else, he certainly can give one to George. George calls the wholesaler up to return everything. George keeps beating Harry von Zell at cards. He wants to show Harry how he does it so George plays against Gracie. But then she keeps winning. When the truck comes, Gracie also gives them the two suits that were just delivered from the tailors. Ronnie Burns appears as Mr. Evans, a customer. Joseph Kearns appears as Mr. Tavelman, George's Tailor. George E. Stone appears as Frankie, Tavelman's assistant. Note: See similar plot line, Season 1, Episode 25 "Buying Wholesale".
131	39	"Mortons Exchange Houses with the Gibsons from New York"	Frederick De Cordova	Sid Dorfman, Harvey Helm, Keith Fowler & William Burns	August 16, 1954
The Mortons will soon be vacationing in New York. Harry Von Zell's friends, Edith and Charlie Gibson (Mabel Albertson and Don Shelton) from New York, are staying at a hotel. Blanche and Gracie both suggest that the Morton's and the Gibson's exchange residences so neither would have to pay hotel bills. George does a monologue about how he'll miss the Morton's. Gracie has a confusing conversation with Mr. Gibson, who is a weatherman. Harry Morton tells Blanche their vacation has been postponed for a week. George then offers the Morton's the guest room in his home. Gracie tells George that she invited the Gibson's to take their bedroom and her and George would stay in the guest room. Harry Morton tells George that they will move back to their house. The Gibsons are concerned about sharing the house with so many people, and von Zell offers his apartment. George tells the Gibsons that the Mortons are back home so they can still stay. Gracie tells von Zell with the Gibsons going to his apartment, he should take the guest room. George and Gracie wind up sleeping in the car. Ross Elliott appears as the Luggage store Clerk.
132	40	"George Teaches Gracie Not to Start Rumors"	Frederick De Cordova	Sid Dorfman, Harvey Helm, Keith Fowler & William Burns	August 23, 1954
Gracie causes some confusion at a Western Union office. George gives Gracie an example of how a rumor can begin. George does a monologue about rumors. Gracie inadvertently spreads the rumor. The rumor builds until everyone believes George was a big winner in Las Vegas. When the Mortons and von Zell confront George about his winnings, he perpetuates the rumor by saying he won even more money than they thought. By now, the rumor is out of hand and George worries that if the IRS hears about the money, he could be in big trouble. Harry Morton tells Gracie that to offset the winnings, George needs some losses like bad stocks. Gracie calls Mr. Peters (Douglass Dumbrille), a stock broker to buy some worthless stock. In the end, George is able to prove that he did not win any money. Sandra Burns appears as a customer. Adrienne Marden appears as the Western Union Clerk. Doris Packer appears as Margie Clark, a woman waiting send a wire to her husband in Chicago.

=== Season 5 (1954–55) ===
No. overall	No. in season	Title	Directed by	Written by	Original release date
133	1	"George Invites Critics to Watch First Show of Season"	Frederick De Cordova	Sid Dorfman, Harvey Helm, Keith Fowler, William Burns	October 4, 1954
Gracie goes through a book store and invites total strangers over to the house to watch George and Gracie's first TV show of the new season. George does a monologue about being nervous on opening night and critics not always being right. George invited two newspapermen, Jack Hellman (Ross Elliott) from Variety and Leo Guild (Donald Curtis) from The Hollywood Reporter. Harry Morton is upset with Blanche because she forgot to get his ledger paper. Harry von Zell tells Gracie that it probably wasn't a good idea to invite those people over and she should call them and tell them not to come. Gracie misunderstands and calls Helman and Guild to tell them not to come. Gracie has a confusing conversation with Postman Beasley. George gets a hold of the newspapermen and re-invites them. George tries to get the names of the people Gracie invited, but doesn't have much luck. After moving back and forth from George's house and the Morton's house, George, Helman and Guild wind up watching the show in a bar. King Donovan appears as a book store clerk. Irene Tedrow appears as a customer. William Forrest appears as the man with the Greeting Cards. Note: According to UCLA, "This episode was the only George Burns and Gracie Allen Show episode filmed in color, although it has been syndicated in black and white."
134	2	"Gracie Goes to the Do-It-Yourself Show"	Frederick De Cordova	Sid Dorfman, Harvey Helm, Keith Fowler, William Burns	October 11, 1954
At a Do-It-Yourself Show, Blanche buys a bunch of gadgets, and Gracie buys an electric saw so George can build a dresser. George does a monologue about how he's not very handy with tools. Both Harry Morton and George will not use the gadgets, and George demands Gracie return the saw. Gracie hires carpenter Manny Dillon (Dave Willock) to build the dresser for the house. Because Gracie wants people to think George built the dresser, George tells his friends that Dillon is really director Charles Vidor, then a golf pro, then a rhumba instructor. Dillion says George's friends are "a little nuts" as they each approach him for advice unrelated to carpentry. Harry von Zell tells the Mortons that he looked through George's garage window and saw Dillon making the dresser. Harry Morton comes up with a plan to teach George a lesson for trying to take credit for the dresser. But the plan results in George and the two Harrys getting in trouble with a Policeman (Robert Foulk). John Alvin appears as The Wonder Glue Pitchman. Frank J. Scannell as The Power Tool Demonstrator.
135	3	"Gracie Gives Wedding in Payment of a Favor"	Frederick De Cordova	Sid Dorfman, Harvey Helm, Keith Fowler, William Burns	October 18, 1954
Gracie decides to throw an extravagant wedding for Mrs. Nelson's daughter Carol (Sally Fraser) at the Burns house. Gracie tells Blanche she's doing this because Mrs. Nelson did an incredible favor for her. George does a monologue about Gracie hosting the wedding and why is he paying all the bills. And he doesn't even know the people. Blanche talks Harry into being the best man. Monsieur Robert, the Caterer (Maurice Marsac) and Gaston, the Cook (Eugene Borden) arrive. George asks Carol what was the big favor that her mother did for Gracie, that Gracie is doing all this. Before Carol can tell him, she is called away to get dressed. George then asks Gracie what the favor was, but she is also called away. Gracie asks Harry von Zell to do something and at first he says no, but then agrees to. Gracie gives bridegroom Jim Goodwin (Ronnie Burns) marriage advice. The wedding starts and von Zell is the flower girl. George finally finds out the big favor. Two weeks ago Gracie's car got stuck on Beverly Drive and Mrs. Nelson gave Gracie a push. Hal K. Dawson as Henry Nelson. Estelle Etterre as Wedding Guest.
136	4	"Gracie Gives a Baby Shower for Virginia Beasley"	Frederick De Cordova	Sid Dorfman, Harvey Helm, Keith Fowler, William Burns	October 25, 1954
Gracie wants to throw a surprise baby shower for the mailman's daughter at the Brown Derby. Blanche suggests that George fill in as a fourth for Harry's bridge game. George does a monologue about Gracie throwing these types of parties all the time and he's against it as he gets stuck paying for it. He also talks about not wanting to play bridge with Harry. Meanwhile, Harry Morton doesn't want George playing cards with him and asks Harry von Zell to keep George occupied. Harry von Zell doesn't want to spend the evening with George either. George insists there will be no shower. He changes his mind about the shower and hires Mrs. Webber (Doris Packer) to decorate his house, thinking the shower will be there. Gracie has a confusing conversation with Mrs. Weber. George winds up playing cards with Harry Morton's stuffy friends (Richard Deacon and Forrest Lewis) and beats them. After the game, he comes home to an empty decorated house. Betty Lynn appears as Virginia Beasley, daughter of Mr. Beasley the mailman. Mary Lawrence appears as the Woman Clerk. Note: Lynn would later gain television fame in the recurring role of Thelma Lou, girlfriend of deputy Barney Fife on The Andy Griffith Show.
137	5	"Auto License Bureau; George Becomes an Author"	Frederick De Cordova	Sid Dorfman, Harvey Helm, Keith Fowler, William Burns	November 1, 1954
Gracie delivers her unique talent of reasoning at the driver's license bureau. Her and Blanche talk about how George is going to write his autobiography. Mr. Harkness (John Gallaudet), the Drivers License Clerk, is having a hard time understanding Gracie's answers. He finally finds out Gracie already has a drivers license and asks her why she is applying for one. Gracie tells him she wants another one for her other purse. George does a monologue about the response he got for writing a book and the secret of being a great writer. Gracie asks Mrs. Foster (Louise Lorimer), an authors wife, what a writer's wife is supposed to do. Harry Morton and Harry von Zell don't think George has the talent to write a book. However, they lavish him with praise and gifts hoping to get their names in the book. Blanche tells George what the two Harrys really think of him as a writer. Jack Goodman (Dayton Lummis) from Simon & Schuster comes by and says if the first 3 chapters of the book are funny, he'll publish it. George's friends come by and laugh at everything he reads, even the contract. Ken Christy appears as a Policeman. Note: Stafford Repp, later known for his portrayal of Chief O'Hara in the 1966-1968 television series Batman, appears as a frustrated man trying to take his drivers license test.
138	6	"George Trying to Keep Doctor's Appointment"	Frederick De Cordova	Unknown	November 8, 1954
George has an appointment to take a physical exam, but each time he's prepared to leave a distraction pulls him away from his car and Gracie absconds with his keys.
139	7	"Gracie Thinks She and George are Moving to New York"	Frederick De Cordova	Sid Dorfman, Harvey Helm, Keith Fowler, William Burns	November 15, 1954
George needs to talk with CBS media mogul William S. Paley. Harry Von Zell runs into Gracie at a drugstore and mentions that Paley is going to New York. Gracie somehow believes he said the Burnses are moving to New York. When Gracie leaves the drugstore crying, von Zell almost gets into a fight with a man Gracie was talking to. George does a monologue about talking to Bill Paley and when they met. Gracie and Blanche cannot stand to be apart. Blanche wants to move to New York also, and Harry refuses. After consulting Mr. Beasley the postman, Gracie concocts a story about George witnessing a robbery, which would necessitate his staying in California as a possible witness. While calling him mean and selfish, the Morton's return all the items they borrowed from George. Sgt. Webster (Tol Avery) calls Gracie to tell her the newspapers are running the story about George witnessing an armored car holdup and the crook might come after him. George explains to Gracie that they are not moving. The Mortons, von Zell and George are in the house terrified that the crook may be outside. Sgt. Webster comes by to tell Gracie that the crook turn himself in.
140	8	"Shoplifter and the Missing Ruby Clip"	Frederick De Cordova	Sid Dorfman, Harvey Helm, Keith Fowler, William Burns	November 22, 1954
Gracie and Blanche are at a department store. When a shoplifter (Claire Du Brey) senses she may be caught, she slips a stolen ruby clip into Lucille Vanderlip's (Sarah Selby) purse. Gracie gets the impression that Lucille has stolen the ruby clip and helps her avoid apprehension. George does a monologue about shoplifting, childhood friends of his who stole and other thieves. Meanwhile, Harry Morton tries to help von Zell get a raise, but George knows what they're up to. Gracie goes to the Vanderlip house and sees a ruby clip that Lucille had actually bought days ago and thinks that Lucille went back to the store and stole it again. Gracie takes the clip and has Blanche return it. Detective Sharkey (Parley Baer) asks Blanche who gave her the clip, because that person stole it from Lucille. Harry Morton tells Sharkey to speak with George. George explains to Gracie that Lucille actually bought the clip. Gracie has von Zell take her to the store to try and steal the clip back. Everyone thinks that von Zell put Gracie up to it. Except George, who tells von Zell that he still gets his raise. Damian O'Flynn as a Customer. Pat Flaherty as The Store Detective. Helen Mowery as The Glove Clerk.
141	9	"Gracie Saves Blanche's Marriage"	Frederick De Cordova	Sid Dorfman, Harvey Helm, Keith Fowler, William Burns	November 29, 1954
After reading Blanche's fortune from a weight machine, Gracie concludes Blanche is in love with Dan Hubbard (John Warburton), a man she encountered at the grocery store. George does a monologue about how he can make quick decisions. Pretending to be Blanche, Gracie calls Mrs. Hubbard (Frances Mercer). She tells Mrs. Hubbard that Dan has to stop being in love with her as she is already married. Mrs. Hubbard confronts Harry Morton and tells him Dan is in love with Blanche and they have been meeting at the market. Harry confronts Blanche about Dan. Blanche learns from Edith, the checker at the store, about Gracie's misunderstanding the fortune. Harry von Zell brings his girlfriend Mary Jane (Jean Willes) over to meet George. Misunderstanding a conversation between Dan and von Zell, Gracie tells Mary Jane that von Zell is married. George figures out what is going on and invites everyone over to dinner to straighten things out. Gracie also stops Mary Jane's brother Jim (William Boyett) from punching von Zell in the nose. Adrienne Marden appears as Laura, a woman at the grocery store.
142	10	"Burnses and Mortons Going to Hear Antonelli Concert"	Frederick De Cordova	Sid Dorfman, Harvey Helm, Keith Fowler, William Burns	December 6, 1954
Gracie and Blanche are shopping for hats. George does a monologue about going to concerts. Harry Morton tells Blanche about his musical family. The Burns, Mortons, and Harry Von Zell and his date Alice Roberts (Dorothy Patrick) are going to a concert performed by the Antonelli String Quartet. George thinks he has come up with the perfect plan to get out of attending the concert. He buys a jigsaw puzzle and hopes Gracie and his guests will be too distracted putting it together to remember the concert's starting time. Mrs. Bellamy (Doris Packer) of the Philharmonic Society delivers the tickets, which George is supposed to pay for. She tells Gracie the Antonelli quartet is composed of four brothers from Italy: Pasquale, Lorenzo, Buseppi, and Pietro. Mrs. Bellamy goes on to tell how they started playing music. George keeps trying to get someone to help him with the puzzle but no one seems interested. People start arriving and get ready to leave for the concert. Suddenly, everyone gets interested in the puzzle. George's plan fails when Gracie puts the puzzle together in a matter of seconds. Vivi Janiss and Aline Towne appear as saleswomen at I. Magnin.
143	11	"George Gets Call from Unknown Victor"	Frederick De Cordova	Sid Dorfman, Harvey Helm, Keith Fowler, William Burns	December 13, 1954
Gracie causes some confusion for Harry Morton and another customer (Pierre Watkin) in a clothing store. Gracie tells Harry that George is irritated with her. She mishandled a telephone call about films, from someone named Victor, who did not leave his last name or phone number. George does a monologue about who the phone call was from and Gracie not having a great memory. Harry Von Zell tries to teach Gracie a method for remembering things. Victor calls again, and Gracie uses the von Zell method, but she still doesn't get the number right. Harry and Blanche discuss Gracie, Blanche forgetting to give Harry a message and Blanche spending too much money. Victor calls a third time, and Gracie takes down his number. George calls, disguising his voice, to see if Gracie will take a message. She knows it's him and he tells her to tear up the message. Gracie tears up Victor's message. George thinks the original caller might have been British director Victor Saville in London, so Gracie calls his number and leaves a message. Saville returns the call, but he was not the original caller. Victor the delivery boy (Carl "Alfalfa" Switzer) finally comes to the house with a Cash on delivery package of film snap shots, and says he has been trying to call George all day. Joseph Kearns appears as Monte Factor, the clothing store salesman.
144	12	"Harry Morton's Alumni Banquet"	Frederick De Cordova	Sid Dorfman, Harvey Helm, Keith Fowler, William Burns	December 20, 1954
Harry Morton's college alumni association is having a banquet, and Harry has promised them he can get George to act as Master of Ceremonies. Afraid that George might turn him down, Harry decides to have Gracie ask him. George does a monologue about who Harry might ask and how George started entertaining. Harry speaks to Gracie, but she gets confused and thinks she herself is being asked to be master of ceremonies. She tells Harry von Zell that she does not want the job and von Zell volunteers to do it. When von Zell tells George he will be emceeing, George gets upset and fires him. Gracie tells von Zell she will go to the college and get George the job. Gracie speaks to Mr. Brooks (Frank Wilcox), the college club manager, who has her talk to the college president. Meanwhile, Morton is wondering whether Gracie has spoken to George yet. Blanche tells Morton to go and ask George. Morton goes to George, but George sends him away. Gracie tells George about the men she met at the club. Mr. Weatherby (Howard Wendell), Mr. Merkel (Harry Antrim) and Mr. Kennedy (Wheaton Chambers) come by the house and ask George to perform. George starts to sing and the men leave. Lester Dorr appears as the Waiter at the club.
145	13	"Gracie Thinks Bob Cummings Is in Love with Her"	Frederick De Cordova	Sid Dorfman, Harvey Helm, Keith Fowler, William Burns	December 27, 1954
Gracie and George come home late from a party. The Morton's just came back from a movie at the same time. Gracie, while trying to tell Blanche about the party, winds up waking all the neighbors. George does a monologue about the Danny Kaye party he was just at. Gracie overhears Bob Cummings say "I'm in love with your wife," as he is reciting script dialogue to George and Harry von Zell for a play he's doing. Not knowing it is just dialogue, she concludes that she is the object of his affections and tells Blanche what she heard. Blanche says that Gracie must have misunderstood what he said. But then Bob says something else that makes Gracie think he is after her. Something von Zell says leads the Morton's to believe Gracie. Everyone is telling George to fight and he doesn't know what they're talking about. Gracie's dressmaker friend Jane (Elvia Allman) gives Gracie advice on repelling Cummings. Gracie and Cummings finally get it straightened out. Note: This episode was conceived as cross-promotion for The Bob Cummings Show (1955), which was produced by Burns' production company, McAdden Productions.
146	14	"George's Mother-in-Law Trouble"	Frederick De Cordova	Sid Dorfman, Harvey Helm, Keith Fowler, William Burns	January 3, 1955
A misheard conversation at the post office leads Harry Von Zell to spread the word that because George would not let Gracie have her mother visit, they had an enormous fight and Gracie wants a divorce. George does a monologue about what von Zell said, that George gets along with Gracie's mother and couples should talk things out. Blanche tells her husband what George supposedly did, and Harry agrees with George. This causes Blanche and Harry to have a fight. George tells Gracie she should invite her mother to visit. When Blanche confronts George, he tells her that his mother-in-law is coming to visit. Blanche tells this to Harry and now Harry is mad at George. Meanwhile, von Zell tries to get George to invest with him in an anti-smog invention. von Zell tells George he has a plan to have Gracie's mother not come to visit. George says if the plan works, he'll invest in the invention. But, Gracie's mother calls and says she cannot come by after all. Though he really is happy, George puts on an act about how sad he is about the news. That and something von Zell says gets Gracie to call her mother back and persuade her to come. Mary Treen as Mrs. Curtis, and Herb Vigran, are post office customers. Phil Chambers appears as The Postal Clerk.
147	15	"George and the Glendale Eagle Publicity Stunt"	Frederick De Cordova	Sid Dorfman, Harvey Helm, Keith Fowler, William Burns	January 10, 1955
Blanche and Gracie are playing cards. Blanche mentions that Harry has been looking for a new car with Harry von Zell. Thanks to Gracie, George is scheduled to go to the airport to shake hands with the Glendale Eagle at 6 in the morning as a publicity stunt. The Eagle built his own airplane and is going to take it on its first flight. George does a monologue about his old publicity man Red Benson (Peter Leeds). George is not thrilled about going. He tries to get some sleep, but Gracie keeps talking to him. George oversleeps. Red calls and George tells him that he cannot be there till later as he has sprained his ankle. Red tells George that the Eagle won't be able to wait. Red calls back and says that the Eagle will wait until later to fly. Blanche and Harry argue over which is better for George's ankle, an ice pack or a hot water bottle. Gracie calls Dr. French (Raymond Greenleaf) to examine George's ankle. When the doctor gets there, Gracie tells him that he should not let George know he is a doctor. Gracie tells George that Dr. French is a car salesman. Hours later, George finally gets to the airport only to learn that the Eagle has already left. Harry Cheshire appears as Mr. Roberts, a man at the airport. Don Dillaway as Man at Airport counter.
148	16	"No Seats for Friar's Club Dinner"	Frederick De Cordova	Sid Dorfman, Harvey Helm, Keith Fowler, William Burns	January 17, 1955
The Friar's Club testimonial dinner for George and Gracie is sold out. Because of a misunderstanding, Gracie believes there are extra tickets and invites the Mortons and the Bagleys. George does a monologue about Friar's Club testimonial dinner and George and Gracie filling in for vaudeville acts that couldn't perform. When Harry von Zell asks George for some tickets and George tells him he doesn't have any extra, Gracie realizes she made a mistake. Now Gracie is intent on figuring out a way to get the Mortons and the Bagleys in. She speaks to Mr. Fortune (Lester Matthews) of the Friar's Club to see if she can get more tickets. While there, she causes some confusion when people mistake her for a secretary. Gracie hopes to solve the ticket dilemma by dressing the Mortons and the Bagleys as waiters and cigarette girls. George later shows up with four tickets after a cancellation by other guests. Irene Hervey appears as Clara Bagley, while Michael Whalen appears as Joe Bagley. Douglas Evans appears as Jerry Hannigan.
149	17	"Blanche and Clara Bagley Leave Their Husbands"	Frederick De Cordova	Sid Dorfman, Harvey Helm, Keith Fowler, William Burnsy.	January 24, 1955
Despite the fact that Blanche and Clara had a fight, they attend a tea party given by Gracie. George does a monologue about what women fight about and what men fight about. Clara tells Gracie she's leaving Joe because he took Blanche's side in the fight. Gracie offers their guest room to Clara. Blanche and Harry have a fight when he takes Clara's side. Gracie invites Blanche to stay and the two women bond over their opinions of their husbands. Joe and Harry commiserate with each other, and George wants them to get their wives to go home. George tells Gracie to get the women out of the house. George puts the women's suitcases back in their homes, but mixes them up. Joe and Harry are about to apologize, but Blanche and Clara now believe their husbands have other women. George explains what he did and the couples forgive each other. Mabel Albertson appears as Gertrude Mills. Randy Stuart appears as Marilyn Schaffer.
150	18	"Gracie Gets a Valet for George"	Frederick De Cordova	Sid Dorfman, Harvey Helm, Keith Fowler, William Burns	January 31, 1955
Gracie tells Blanche about Ronald Colman's party that her and George attended. After seeing Ronald's valet do his work, Gracie would like to hire one for George. George tells Harry von Zell that he saw von Zell's girlfriend with another man at the party. George does a monologue about having a valet. Gracie hires man servant Cyril Blodgett (Olaf Hytten). Harry von Zell tells Gracie that George will never go for having a valet. Gracie tells George that Blodgett is really a valet that Blanche hired. He is staying at the Burn's home in hopes that Harry Morton will see how nice it is to have a valet and agree to get one. George overhears the Morton's and von Zell laughing about how gullible George is for falling for Gracies story. George confronts the three of them for making fun of him. Blodgett tells George he is resigning. Not knowing this, Gracie has Blanche dress up as a French maid to flirt with Blodgett and hopefully get him to quit. When Blodgett leaves, Gracie thinks it is because of her plan. Shirley Mitchell as The Girl at the employment office.
151	19	"Vanderlip Leaves His Parakeet with George"	Frederick De Cordova	Sid Dorfman, Harvey Helm, Keith Fowler, William Burns	February 7, 1955
Mr. Vanderlip leaves his parakeet with George. Gracie assumes it is her anniversary present and, feeling sorry for the caged bird, sets it free. She finds out from George it was the Vanderlip's bird. George does a monologue about people and their pets and working with animals during vaudeville. Gracie buys another parakeet from a pet store to replace the lost bird. Meanwhile, Harry von Zell finds the real Vanderlip bird, and they take the replacement bird back to the pet store. Harry Morton convinces George to release what they believe to be the replacement bird, not realizing it is Vanderlip's bird back in the cage. After talking to Gracie and von Zell, George realizes he let the Vanderlip bird go. Delivery boy Joey Bagley (Gary Marshall (not to be confused with Garry Marshall)) finds Vanderlip's bird and returns him. Mr. Vanderlip is angry at George because he found out about the imposter bird. He tells George to get the imposter out of his bird's cage. When George releases the bird, they realize it's Chester's bird. Blanche saves the day by finding the bird. Madge Blake appears as pet store owner Mrs. Rudy, and Byron Foulger appears as her husband. George E. Stone appears as a man in the pet store.
152	20	"Blanche's Brother, Roger the Moocher, Visits"	Frederick De Cordova	Sid Dorfman, Harvey Helm, Keith Fowler, William Burns	February 14, 1955
Both George and Harry Morton despise Blanche's brother Roger (King Donovan). George calls him a playboy who has never held a job. He freeloads from the Burnses, upsetting George, who finds Roger using his clothes, borrowing their car and charging expenses to George. George does a monologue about Roger and his mooching and other relatives. Both Gracie and Blanche adore Roger and they both make excuses for him. Gracie even goes to an aircraft company and speaks to Mr. Hughes (Frank Ferguson) about getting Roger a job. But Hughes thinks it's Gracie that's applying. Miss Tuttle (Jean Willes), from the company, tries to give Gracie an appitude test, which doesn't go well. After learning that the job would be for Roger, Miss Tuttle tells Gracie that Roger needs to make his own application. Harry von Zell complains to George that Roger is dating his girlfriend Alice. Gracie believes Roger got the job and calls the Morton's to let them know. Harry Morton is afraid that if Roger gets the job, he'll stay there forever. Roger hears about the job and immediately leaves and heads for Seattle.
153	21	"George and the Missing Five Dollars and Missing Baby Pictures"	Frederick De Cordova	Sid Dorfman, Harvey Helm, Keith Fowler, William Burns	February 21, 1955
George casually mentions that he is missing $5. George needs to lend Ned Brown (Ross Elliott) his baby pictures to send to the publisher for George's upcoming book. George does a monologue about his baby pictures, things he found while looking for them and people saving worthless things. He tears up the house looking for the pictures. All his friends think he is searching for the money. Harry Morton speaks to George about fiscal responsibility. Each of his friends thinks it is easier to just give George $5 than to have him scrounge around looking for the missing money. George makes a tidy profit when each of them give him $5. After George goes back to looking for the pictures, his friends decide it is time to consult Dr. Bellamy (Frank Wilcox) about his obsession. When Bellamy talks to Gracie, it only leads to confusion. Everyone agrees that if they find a bigger problem for George to worry about, he'll forget about the money. George over hears their plan and plays along. Ned comes by to pick up the pictures and returns $5 that George lent him for cab fare. Syd Saylor appears as Mr. Cannon, the gardener.
154	22	"Gracie Becomes a Portrait Artist After Museum Visit"	Frederick De Cordova	Sid Dorfman, Harvey Helm, Keith Fowler, William Burns	February 28, 1955
Gracie tells George about her cousin Louise who has double vision. George and Gracie are invited to Bill Getz's house to view and talk about fine art. George has absolutely no interest in it. Gracie wants to help George learn about art, so she plans to visit a museum. George does a monologue about Bill, his paintings, George knowing nothing about modern art and artists. At the museum, Gracie gains enough knowledge to get mixed up about the subject. Harry Morton tries to educate George about art, but that does not go well. Gracie buys some art supplies in order to paint a masterpiece because they command the most money. She then has George pose for a painting. The Mortons and Harry von Zell come by to view the painting. Each sees something different and none of them see it as George. Dan Tobin appears as the Museum Guide. Lillian Bronson as a Woman in the museum. William Schallert appears as Pete from the paint store.
155	23	"George and the 14-Karat Gold Trombone"	Frederick De Cordova	Sid Dorfman, Harvey Helm, Keith Fowler, William Burns	March 7, 1955
George's musician friend Ted Montague (Douglas Fowley), who mooches money off people by leaving his worthless trombone as collateral, comes by for a visit. George delivers a monologue about moochers he has known in show business. His subsequent trombone lessons annoy his neighbors the Mortons. At Morton's urging, Gracie convinces Harry von Zell to give away the trombone to a door-to-door magazine salesman. George finds out that it was Morton's idea to get rid of the trombone. To get back at him, George tells Morton the trombone was solid gold, hand engraved, and worth $10,000. Gracie goes to see loan officer Mr. Perry (John Hoyt) and tries to borrow $10,000. While waiting for Mr. Perry, Gracie has some confusing conversations with the other people waiting there. Mr. Perry has a hard time believing that Gracie wants the money to buy a trombone. Mr. Harris (Fred Sherman), from the loan company, comes by to inspect the house for use as collateral. George wants to know what Mr. Harris is doing at the house and Gracie says he sells dogs. Harry von Zell gets the trombone back from the magazine salesperson. Marcia Mae Jones appears as the Receptionist. Vivi Janiss appears as a woman at the loan office.
156	24	"The Romance of Harry Morton and Countess Braganni"	Frederick De Cordova	Sid Dorfman, Harvey Helm, Keith Fowler, William Burns	March 14, 1955
Gracie learns from Mr. Beasley that Blanche will have a neighbor, the Countess Braganni (Ann Lee). Gracie and Blanche read that the Countess is in the country seeking a 5th husband. Meanwhile, George teases Harry Morton about dressing too conservatively. George does a monologue about the way Morton dresses and clothes influencing people. Gracie tells Blanche that she wonders how she should act when meeting a countess. Morton walks by wearing a new, rather "loud" suit. Blanche believes he bought it to impress the Countess and becomes jealous. Upon the advice of Harry von Zell, Gracie inserts herself into the situation and goes to the Hotel Bel-Air to talk to the Countess about Harry Morton. Gracie talks to George about all the people at the hotel and her brother Willy being a bell boy. The Countess visits the Burns house and mistakes George for Morton. After realizing her mistake, an embarrassed Countess says she would never move in next door. Pamela Duncan appears as the Countess' Maid.
157	25	"The Mistaken Marriage of Emily Vanderlip and Roger"	Frederick De Cordova	Sid Dorfman, Harvey Helm, Keith Fowler, William Burns	March 21, 1955
Blanche's brother Roger is visiting again, much to Harry's dismay. Gracie introduces Roger to the wealthy Emily Vanderbilt, daughter of banker Chester Vanderlip. Emily is telling Roger about her engagement to another man. Gracie and Harry von Zell eavesdrop, only hear part of the conversation, and think Emily and Roger are eloping. George does a monologue about Roger visiting and other families black sheep. Gracie and von Zell tell Harry Morton what they heard. Morton could not be happier that his mooching brother-in-law is marrying into money. Morton starts acting very nice to Roger and Roger is wondering why. Gracie tells Roger that everyone knows about him and Emily. Roger now knows why Morton was so nice to him. Chester, Harry von Zell and George come up with a plan to get rid of Roger. Chester offers Roger a job at the bank, but it backfires when Roger accepts. Roger turns the error into an opportunity to hit George up for a large amount of money. Chester and George find out Emily is not marrying Roger. In the end, Gracie's telling of the series of events causes Roger to leave town without accepting anybody's money. And in the process, Roger also causes another of George's plans to backfire.
158	26	"Gracie Adopts a Great Dane Dog"	Frederick De Cordova	Sid Dorfman, Harvey Helm, Keith Fowler, William Burns	March 28, 1955
Gracie mentions to George that her Uncle Harvey might come for a visit. Joe and Clara Bagley's son Joey tells Gracie that his parents have been promising him a dog, but never got him one. He found a dog at the pound, but his parents won't let him have it. Gracie tells Joey he can keep the dog at her house until they can get his parents to accept it. Joey brings over the large dog and Gracie figures she better hide it from George. George does a monologue about Gracie hiding her Uncle Harvey in the guest room and women trying to fool their husbands. Gracie tells Joey to call the dog Uncle Harvey. Gracie brings the dog over to Blanche's house just for a short time. Harry Morton tries to make friends with the dog, but the dog just does not seem to like Harry. George finally discovers the dog. A policeman (John Gallaudet) comes by and tells Gracie that neighbors are complaining about the dog. Gracie tells George that she is trying to help Joey. George tells Gracie the dog has got to go and he doesn't think the Bagley's will let Joey keep it. Clara offers to buy the dog, not knowing it is really Joey's dog. Gracie lets Clara have the dog. Harry tries one more time to make friends with the dog, but it doesn't work.
159	27	"Gracie Tries to Select George's Next Wife"	Frederick De Cordova	Sid Dorfman, Harvey Helm, Keith Fowler, William Burns	April 4, 1955
George is invited to go on a three day yachting trip by Howard Williams. He really does not want to go, but he's turned Howard down so many times, he's run out of excuses. George tells Harry von Zell he gets sea sick. Gracie wants Mr. Sanders to make a yachting uniform for George, but it must be a surprise. Things get confusing when Mr. Sanders tries to get George's measurements from Gracie. George does a monologue about not wanting to go on the yachting trip. Harry Morton tells Blanche how much he loves the outdoors. After a routine visit to her doctor, Gracie reads a fake telegram written by Harry von Zell who signed her doctor's name. The telegram says "wife's condition may be serious", and it urges George not to leave her this weekend. It was meant to give George an excuse to not go on the yachting trip. But Gracie believes she is dying, and begins a search for her replacement in George's life. Gracie brings Miss Gardner (Joan Banks), Mrs. Adams (Ann Doran) and Miss Drake (Vera Marshe) to the house. Gracie leaves the room and George comes by. The ladies tell George why they are there and he sends them away. Howard calls off the yachting trip and George learns about von Zell's telegram. George explains things to Gracie and the Morton's while singing "My Little Grass Shack In Kealakekua, Hawaii".
160	28	"Gracie Gets a Ticket 'Fixed' by the Judge"	Frederick De Cordova	Sid Dorfman, Harvey Helm, Keith Fowler, William Burns	April 11, 1955
Gracie thinks she should not have been issued a parking ticket and refuses to pay it. Harry von Zell tells Gracie that he'll just pay for it. When Gracie says no, von Zell makes up a story that he'll have his friend Judge Russell (Douglass Dumbrille) take care of the ticket. George finds out about the ticket. Without Gracie knowing, George gives von Zell the money to pay for it. Blanche yells at George for what she thinks is not helping Gracie with the ticket. George does a monologue about Blanche yelling at him and wives and husbands being nice to each other. George then plays a prank on Harry Morton and tells him Blanche got a ticket. Harry von Zell tells Gracie he had the Judge fix the ticket. When Gracie hears that Blanche also got a ticket, she goes to the Judge to have him fix that one as well. Gracie has a confusing conversation with the Judge. Officer Quimby (Anthony Warde) brings in George, the Mortons and von Zell for questioning. After some confusion with Gracie, the Judge lets them all go. The Judge also tears up another ticket that Gracie got while they were all there. Mitchell Kowal appears as the Cop.
161	29	"Gracie Hires a Safecracker for Her Wall Safe"	Frederick De Cordova	Sid Dorfman, Harvey Helm, Keith Fowler, William Burns	April 18, 1955
George's business manager tells him to pick up some negotiable bonds from the bank. They need to be turned in by tomorrow or George will lose a lot of money. George tells Gracie that if they had a wall safe, he wouldn't have to go to the bank all the time. Gracie buys a wall safe as a surprise for George. George does a monologue about being a straight man and investments. Gracie locks the paper with the combination, along with the bonds, in the safe. No one can bring themselves to tell George what happened. After Harry von Zell tells Gracie a story, she goes to a pool hall to hire a safe cracker. While waiting for the owner, she has a confusing conversation with two pool players, Morty (Robert Carson) and Joe (Ross Elliott). Owner Frank (Will Wright) shows up and he agrees to try and open the safe. George finds out about the safe and Frank manages to get it open. Frank has to return a second time after Gracie locks the combination inside again. George puts the bonds back in the safe, memorizes the combination, and Harry von Zell burns the paper the combination is written on. After an unrelated conversation with Gracie, George forgets the combination.
162	30	"Gracie Consults Dr. Kirby's Problem Clinic"	Frederick De Cordova	Sid Dorfman, Harvey Helm, Keith Fowler, William Burns	April 25, 1955
Gracie runs into her old high school friend June Higgins at a drug store and brings her back home. June tells Gracie and Blanche that her and her husband Jim (William Forrest) are carnival people. George comes by and meets June, then he and Blanche leave. June tells Gracie that her presumed-dead first husband Oliver White (Frank Ferguson) is still alive. June is not sure how her husband Jim will react as he didn't know she was married before. Gracie talks to Harry von Zell and he recommends consulting Dr. Kirby (Dan Tobin), a television therapist. Gracie decides to go on Dr. Kirby's show and pose as June. George does a monologue about Schwab's Drugstore and George working in a carnival when he was younger. The Mortons see Gracie on TV and assume she is talking about herself. Harry tells Blanche about his mother keeping a secret from his father and him finding out. As he is in town, Gracie speaks to Oliver. He tells her that after he left June, he got a divorce and remarried, so there shouldn't be an issue with Jim. But, he has to leave and cannot tell this to June. Harry von Zell tells George that Gracie was posing as June on the show and that someone gave her the idea to do it. He tries to not tell George it was his idea, but George figures out it was von Zell and fires him. Gracie asks George to pretend to be Oliver and he refuses. June and Jim come by. Gracie tricks von Zell into being Oliver and explains to Jim about the previous marriage. George, then Harry Morton, come in claiming to be Oliver. Jim says he doesn't care about June's past. The real Oliver then also shows up. Ronnie Burns appears as Mr. Leslie.
163	31	"Gracie Wants the House Painted"	Frederick De Cordova	Sid Dorfman, Harvey Helm, Keith Fowler, William Burns	May 2, 1955
Gracie would like to have the house painted coral, but George wants it to stay white. Gracie blackmails Harry von Zell into trying to talk George into the coral paint. But George overhears the conversation. After von Zell talks to George, George makes it look to Gracie and Blanche like Harry talked George out of the coral paint. George does a monologue about how it's human nature not to be satisfied with what one has, women always want what they haven't got and everyone being envious. George tells Harry Morton to not let Blanche talk him into painting the house because Gracie will want the same. Gracie calls painters Charlie Irwin Sr. (Irving Bacon) and Charlie Irwin Jr. (William Schallert), but gives them the Morton's address by mistake. The painters start painting the Morton house and Harry tells them to stop. Blanche tries to convince Harry that she didn't hire the painters. Gracie talks to the painters again and has a very confusing conversation with them. Due to the cost, Gracie asks them to paint half the house. Gracie blackmails von Zell into getting George out of the house so the painters can start working. George and Von Zell return from the Friar's club and George see the half painted house. After fighting with Gracie, George gives in and has the painters paint the other half coral. But Gracie does something to mess things up.
164	32	"Gracie Plays Talent Scout for Imitator"	Frederick De Cordova	Sid Dorfman, Harvey Helm, Keith Fowler, William Burns	May 9, 1955
An impressionist named Tommy (Eddie Ryder) pretends to be the grocery delivery boy for the Burns house. He hopes to do some impressions as a sort of audition. Gracie and Blanche love his performance and tell George. George does a monologue about getting into show business and other people wanting to get in. George speaks to Cliff Bennett (Louis Jean Heydt) of the Shrine Auditorium. Cliff is not sure about putting a delivery boy in the show. George has Jerry (Barry Truex), the real delivery boy, come by. George and Cliff are baffled by the kid's lack of talent. Gracie, Blanche and Harry Morton are mad at George for not giving the young man a chance. Harry von Zell tries to get George and Gracie to make up with each other. George tells Gracie to call the man up and if von Zell likes him, he's on the show. Harry loves Tommy's act and tells George. George calls the grocery store and gets Jerry back. George still thinks Jerry has no talent and sends him away. George finally meets Tommy, things get straightened out and Tommy will appear on the show.
165	33	"Gracie and George Try for a Day at the Beach"	Frederick De Cordova	Sid Dorfman, Harvey Helm, Keith Fowler, William Burns	May 16, 1955
For George, it is a business meeting with Howard Williams (Pierre Watkin) at his beach house. For Gracie, it is a chance to have fun with all her friends at the beach. George does a monologue about conservative Howard Williams seeing George's friends in their beach outfits and doing business outside of the office. Unfortunately, each time they're prepared to leave for the beach, some interruption detains them. Six hours later, they all finally leave for the beach and Howard Williams shows up at the Burns house. Kathryn Card appears as housekeeper Mrs. Johnson. John Alvin appears as the man with the Petition. Vivi Janiss appears as Mrs. Myers. Jean Wiles reprises her role as Harry von Zell's girlfriend Alice. Note: Beginning with this show, nearly every episode closed with a 3-4 minute "Afterpiece," one of George and Gracie's vaudeville routines, which were performed in front of an audience after the weekly sitcom storyline was resolved. This episode's vaudeville Afterpiece is titled "Beach - Gracie's Family."
166	34	"The Uranium Caper"	Frederick De Cordova	Sid Dorfman, Harvey Helm, Keith Fowler, William Burns	May 23, 1955
The two Harrys have been out on an unsuccessful uranium prospecting expedition. Gracie and Blanche overhear George talking on the phone to his writer, Willy Burns, about developing a story about uranium prospecting. Gracie and Blanche believe he is bragging to someone about discovering the biggest uranium strike ever. George does a monologue about the two Harrys being prospectors. Gracie is upset with George for keeping the uranium mine a secret. George tries to explain that it was a story line, but Gracie doesn't believe him. The Mortons, as well as Gracie and Harry von Zell become upset that he is not sharing the wealth. Blanche tells the two Harrys that they could get part of Georges mine by offering him a partnership in their non-existent mine. George knows what they're up to and doesn't fall for it. Gracie sees mining engineer J.J. Hartford (Paul Harvey) to learn about uranium and get some samples. A confusing conversation ensuses, but Gracie is given the samples to take home. The samples cause even more confusion about who actually has a mine. Note: Uranium ore prospecting peaked in the 1950s, and subsequently became the subject of several television shows of the era. The Jack Benny Program ran a similar episode in December 1955.
167	35	"Blanche and Brother Roger Move in with the Burnses"	Frederick De Cordova	Sid Dorfman, Harvey Helm, Keith Fowler, William Burns	May 30, 1955
Blanche's brother Roger shows up unexpectedly, upsetting Harry Morton. This causes such a rift between Blanche and Harry. Blanche tells Gracie that she is leaving him. Not knowing about Roger, George suggests that Blanche move in with them until things settle down. Gracie invites Roger to stay as well. George does a monologue about sharing a room with Roger, hiding money from Roger and how it doesn't pay to be nice to people. George decides to move in with Harry Morton. Harry von Zell introduces Gracie to his friend Mr. Trent (Walter Woolf King), a divorce lawyer. Roger tells von Zell about two sisters he met, who happen to be dancers. Roger borrows some money from von Zell so they can double date that night. George sees Gracie talking to Mr. Trent and misunderstands. Jenny (Barbara Knudson) and Penny Miller (Ruta Lee) come by the Morton house looking for Roger. The sisters audition for George and Harry. Gracie and Blanche see this and misunderstand. George pays Roger to explain things to the wives. Before Roger can, the sisters explain things to Gracie and Blanche. Roger invites everyone out to dinner using George's money. Note: This episode's vaudeville Afterpiece is titled "Auction Routine."
168	36	"Gracie Believes George Has a Criminal Record"	Frederick De Cordova	Sid Dorfman, Harvey Helm, Keith Fowler, William Burns	June 6, 1955
Old vaudeville partner Danny Goodman (Jack Lomas) visits George. At first, George doesn't recognize Danny. Gracie mistakes an old photograph of "The Jolly Jailbirds" skit George used to do with Danny, for the real thing. George does a monologue about seeing people from long ago and performing with Danny. Blanche tells Harry that George has a prison record. Rather than asking George directly about the photograph, she takes it to the Beverly Hills police station to get answers about George's past. Beverly Hills PD turns her away, and then calls George to alert him about Gracie's visit. George has Goodman dress in an old prison uniform and hides him in the closet to play a prank on Gracie, by telling her Goodman just escaped from prison. Gracie goes to the Mortons house and tells the Mortons and Harry von Zell and then calls the police. Meanwhile, George goes off to put a prison suit on as well. When Gracie, the Mortons and Harry von Zell confront Danny with a gun, he runs away. The police show up just as George comes down in the prison outfit. They arrest everyone for playing a practical joke on the police. Ray Teal appears as Lt. Boyd. Frank Gerstle appears as Sgt. McDuff. Robert Brubaker appears as a Policeman. Note: This episode's vaudeville Afterpiece is titled "Driver's License Routine."
169	37	"Gracie Gets an Extension Visa for Jeanette Duval"	Frederick De Cordova	Sid Dorfman, Harvey Helm, Keith Fowler, William Burns	June 13, 1955
Gracie befriends a young French woman named Jeanette Duval (Lita Milan) who has immigration problems. Gracie speaks with Mr. Downs (Howard Wendell) at the immigration office. He says there's no way he can extend her visa. Mr. Downs tries to find a way to get rid of Gracie. But because he involves Blanche, things backfire on him. George does a monologue about people traveling. Gracie's solution is to marry Jeanette off to Harry von Zell to keep her from being deported. Harry Morton tells Blanche she shouldn't have gotten involved with Gracie and the immigration office. Harry von Zell tells Gracie he can't marry Jeanette as he does not want to ruin his relationship with his girlfriend Alice. But Gracie misunderstands and convinces Alice that Harry is marrying someone else. Alice gets upset and takes off Harry's ring, giving it to Gracie. Gracie gives Jeanette the ring and tells her she will go off and find von Zell. Harry Morton walks in and Jeanette mistakes him for von Zell. Harry von Zell sees Jeanette wearing his ring, so he faints. George brings everyone together to explain things. Alice's brother Jim (Ronnie Burns) agrees to marry Jeanette. Edward Ashley appears as Jean Parnell. Sandra Burns appears as Miss Ferguson the receptionist at the immigration office. Note: This episode's vaudeville Afterpiece is titled "Uncle Harvey and Crowd."
170	38	"Gracie Tries to Cure Roger of Amnesia"	Frederick De Cordova	Sid Dorfman, Harvey Helm, Keith Fowler, William Burns	June 20, 1955
In an attempt to get Roger out of their hair, Harry Morton has found a job for him in another state. Roger stages an accident in the Burns house with a piece of ceiling hitting him on the head. George does a monologue about knowing that Roger is faking the injury and excuses people make to get out of work. Roger fakes amnesia and Blanche tries to bring some of his memory back. Roger knows George is on to him. George tries to tell the Morton's, but Roger keeps up the charade. To find a cure, Gracie goes to Dr. Wilbern (Raymond Greenleaf) and claims she is the one with amnesia. Wilbern decides to go and speak to George about Gracie. Roger calls his friend Joe Ferguson (Anthony Warde) because he wants Joe to pretend he's a doctor and examine him. George overhears the plan. When Dr. Wilbern shows up, George believes he is Roger's friend and gets him to leave. George tells the two Harrys that he called Dr. Gibbons, an amnesia specialist, to expose Roger. Joe Ferguson shows up and everyone thinks he's Dr. Gibbons. Joe says that Roger has a severe case of amnesia and everyone is mad at George for doubting Roger. Note: This episode's vaudeville Afterpiece is titled "Sister Hazel's Eyesight."
171	39	"Lucille Vanderlip Gives a Barbeque Party"	Frederick De Cordova	Sid Dorfman, Harvey Helm, Keith Fowler, William Burns	June 27, 1955
Lucille Vanderlip is planning a barbeque party. She is also buying Chester a new rotisserie as a surprise and asks Gracie if she can have it sent to the Burns house. Gracie asks George if they can get a barbeque for the yard, but he says no and besides he can't cook. George overhears a conversation Gracie is having on the phone and is convinced that Gracie is really throwing a party at home. Gracie explains that the party is at the Vanderlip's, but George doesn't believe her. George does a monologue about barbeque parties, expensive barbeque pits and the gadgets one needs for them and George's hobby is singing. George has a confusing conversation with von Zell and Harry Morton. Harry von Zell thinks George is acting strangely and calls Dr. Briskin (Thomas Browne Henry) to check him out. Meanwhile, the delivery man (Herb Vigran) brings the Vanderlip's rotisserie to the Burns house. George has him take it back. Dr. Briskin comes by and George believes the doctor is a chef who came to teach him how to barbeque. George sends him away. Dr. Briskin tells Gracie that George should be put in a sanitarium and he has a confusing conversation with her. Lucille calls the store about the rotisserie. The delivery man comes by again and George sends the rotisserie back. Thinking Gracie is still having people over, George decides he needs to order enough food for them. A busload of people on a tour of celebrity homes stops in front of the Burns house. George invites the entire busload of tourists into the house thinking they were Gracie's guests. Ronnie Burns appears as a tourist on a bus tour. Hugh Sanders appears as the bus driver. Note: This episode's vaudeville Afterpiece is titled "Aunt Clara Moves Into a New House."
172	40	"The Burnses and Mortons Going to Hawaii"	Frederick De Cordova	Sid Dorfman, Harvey Helm, Keith Fowler, William Burns	July 4, 1955
Gracie, George and Harry von Zell are talking about what they'll do for their vacations. Something George says makes Gracie want to go to Hawaii. Blanche would like to go as well, but Harry Morton refuses. George tells Gracie that they're not going to Hawaii. George does a monologue about Gracie and her family jumping to conclusions and George took Gracie to Honolulu once and enjoying the native dances. Blanche's brother Roger Baker returns and to avoid him, Harry decides to take Blanche to Hawaii. Once George finds out Roger is moving into the Burns' guest room, he tells Gracie to get the tickets. Roger will be watching over the two houses. Gracie has two women come over to teach her and Blanche the hula dance. Blanche gives up trying to learn the dance. Harry von Zell suggests to George and Morton that they tell Roger that von Zell is watching the two houses. Roger overhears this conversation and tells the men that he'll stay and keep von Zell company. George pays Roger to return to Seattle. After the ship leaves port, George mentions that he gave Roger money to bring the wives some flowers and he never showed up. Gracie says that he did show up and she had him wait in the other cabin to surprise them. Note: This episode's vaudeville Afterpiece is titled "Shoe Store Routine."

=== Season 6 (1955–56) ===
Season 6 was a departure from all the previous seasons set in Beverly Hills, California. During Season 6, the Burnses, the Mortons and Harry Von Zell are based in New York while Ronnie tries his hand as a stage actor.

No. overall	No. in season	Title	Directed by	Written by	Original release date
173	1	"The Burnses and Mortons Go to New York"	Frederick De Cordova	Sid Dorfman, Harvey Helm, Keith Fowler, William Burns	October 3, 1955
George and Gracie, and Harry von Zell, accompany Blanche and Harry Morton on a train trip from California to New York where Harry Morton will be working for several months. Word is out that nuclear scientist Professor Eldridge (Paul Harvey) is on the train. Everyone wants to meet "one of the greatest scientists in the world," so he's traveling incognito as Mr. James. George and Gracie are on the cover of TV Guide. Gracie asks Eldridge for the cover of his issue to send to her mother. George does a monologue about going to New York City. Eldridge asks Gracie to play some cards with him. George thinks he's a card sharp trying to take advantage of Gracie. Harry von Zell finds a man who fits the description of the scientist, traveling salesman Mr. Meeker (Damian O'Flynn), and he and George think Meeker is Eldridge. George invites Meeker to a party once they arrive in New York. Eldridge and Gracie play several hands of cards together and Gracie invites him to the party. Believing he is doing a favor for the professor, George pays Meeker's hotel room bill. George arranges for reporters to come to a party to get pictures of Gracie with Eldridge. When Meeker demonstrates the toy he peddles, George and Harry realize their mistake. Eldridge arrives with his wife (Bess Flowers) and the reporters recognize him. Robert Carson as Mr. Maddis. John Alvin as Reporter #1. Roy Glenn as the Train Porter. Carl Reiner in one of his very first acting roles, as a hotel waiter. Note: This episode's vaudeville Afterpiece is titled "Bus Routine."
174	2	"Ronnie Arrives"	Frederick De Cordova	Harvey Helm, Keith Fowler, Norman Paul, William Burns	October 10, 1955
George is supposed to meet his agent, Sonny Werblin (John Gallaudet). Gracie has a surprise for him and everyone tries to keep him at the hotel. George does a monologue about all the surprises Gracie has for him. The surprise turns out to be Ronnie joining his parents in New York. Ronnie tells them that he is intent on becoming a dramatic actor. George and Gracie wanted Ronnie to follow in their footsteps and go into comedy. Ronnie tells his friend Velma Rogers (Judi Meredith, under the name Judi Boutin) that George wants him to go on his comedy show. Velma offers to talk to George. Everyone, including Sonny, is in the hotel room waiting to try and talk Ronnie into comedy. Velma performs a scene with Ronnie from the William Inge play Picnic to convince everyone that Ronnie should be allowed to follow his dream of being a serious actor. (The film adaptation would be released just seven weeks later.) All of George's friends agree that Ronnie should do dramatic acting. George writes him a check for tuition to drama school. Sandra Burns is a voice on the telephone. Peter Brocco appears throughout the New York episodes, as Peter the waiter, who is so amused by Gracie's logic that he keeps jotting down notes on all her comments. Note: Beginning in the 7th season, Judi Meredith will play Bonnie Sue McAfee, the love interest of Ronnie Burns. This episode's vaudeville Afterpiece is titled "Hunting Routine."
175	3	"Ronnie Meets Sabrina"	Frederick De Cordova	Harvey Helm, Keith Fowler, Norman Paul, William Burns	October 17, 1955
Opportunistic Sabrina Doyle (Paula Hill) has lunch with Harry von Zell, hoping he can get her on George's show. Ronnie comes by the table and von Zell introduces him to Sabrina. After Ronnie leaves, von Zell tells Sabrina that there isn't anything George wouldn't do for Ronnie. Meanwhile, George questions Gracie's logic when it comes to getting Ronnie some spending money. George does a monologue about Gracie straightening out Ronnie's problems and jobs George had when he was younger. Gracie and Blanche are incensed that von Zell is cheating on his California girlfriend Alice. Harry and Sabrina come by and to make Harry look old, Blanche tells Sabrina that Harry helped Sophie Tucker get her start in show business. Gracie and Blanche leave to send a message to Alice in California. When Harry can't get her a part on the show, Sabrina asks Ronnie to take her to the hotel. Blanche tells Harry Morton that she doesn't like the idea of older Sabrina going out with Ronnie. Ronnie breaks a date with Velma to go out with Sabrina, in spite of Velma's offer to take him to hear bongos that "he" (alluding to Marlon Brando) played after he made On the Waterfront. Ronnie tells George that he's only interested in Sabrina because he wants experience for a part in a play where he falls in love with an older married woman. George convinces him that Sabrina isn't the right older woman because she's too young and unmarried, so Ronnie dumps Sabrina for Blanche. Ronnie invites Blanche out to go dancing and George takes everyone out for an evening at the Rainbow Room. Note: This episode's vaudeville Afterpiece is titled "Uncle Otis - Explorer."
176	4	"Changing Names"	Frederick De Cordova	Harvey Helm, Keith Fowler, Norman Paul, William Burns	October 24, 1955
George is going over and correcting some of the mistakes in his upcoming book with Irene Knox (Peggy Knudsen) from the publisher. But, he is repeatedly interrupted. George does a monologue about his book coming out next week, subjects that will insure a successful book, English being George's worst subject and George holds up some copies of his book. Harry von Zell tells Gracie that Irene might make a play for George, but Gracie isn't worried. Meanwhile, Ronnie aspires to be a great stage actor, and rebrands himself as Cobb Cochran. Gracie thinks that if she and George change their names, Ronnie wouldn't have to. Gracie decides to take the stage name of Lola E. Benedict. When George hears what Gracie did, he takes in stride and even authorizes a department store to accept her charges in that name. Ronnie overhears him, and believes George is two-timing Gracie. Ronnie tells Harry von Zell, who tells Harry Morton, who tells Blanche, who tells Gracie. Gracie thinks the other woman is Ms. Knox. Ronnie tries to subtly talk to George about the other woman. The situation is clarified when Gracie, Blanche and Ronnie confront George and Irene. Barbara Knudson appears as Lola the Waitress. Note: This episode's vaudeville Afterpiece is titled "Cousin Louise's Wedding."
177	5	"Harry Morton's Cocktail Party"	Frederick De Cordova	Harvey Helm, Keith Fowler, Norman Paul, William Burns	October 31, 1955
Ronnie wants to get a motorcycle because Marlon Brando has one. Harry Morton is trying to impress a new client. Harry asks George if he will help by throwing a cocktail party in his suite. George does a monologue about having to know how to use flattery, George doing favors for people and then George holds up a copy of his new book. Gracie and Blanche go to a bookstore to help promote George's autobiography I Love Her, That's Why!. Gracie tries to get Mrs. Harrington (Isabel Randolph), a customer, to buy George's book. While there, Blanche hits a man she believes has made inappropriate advances towards a woman (Adrienne Marden). The man turns out to be Mr. Forsythe (Russell Hicks), the man that Harry is trying to impress and he wasn't the man that made the pass. That evening Mr. Forsythe comes by Harry's place. When Blanche sees him, she has Gracie pretend to be Harry's wife so as to not ruin the deal. George talks to Helga (Kathleen Freeman), who Gracie hired to help with the party, and he finds out she doesn't speak English. Things get confusing when Ronnie has to pretend Harry Morton is his father and Gracie tries to pass off Helga as George's wife. Mr. Forsythe has had enough and tells Harry he's leaving. Blanche comes in and explains the mistake to Mr. Forsythe, who forgives her. Howard Wendell appears as Mr. Martindale, the bookstore owner. Note: This episode's vaudeville Afterpiece is titled "Uncle Harvey Getting Jobs."
178	6	"The Musical Version"	Frederick De Cordova	Harvey Helm, Keith Fowler, Norman Paul, William Burns	November 7, 1955
Harry von Zell and the Mortons talk about how they heard a musical is being made from George's autobiography. Harry Morton mentions how singing stars Eddie Fisher, Perry Como and Tony Martin (who do not appear on the show) are suggested as actors who could play the lead in the musical. The three decide that they want to invest in the musical. Meanwhile, Ronnie and Velma endlessly rehearse their own play. Joe Downs, the piano player, comes by and at first doesn't realize that Ronnie and Velma are rehearsing. George does a monologue about the musical and he sings several songs. At a party for the investors, everyone is excited about the potential for the show. Composer Mack Gordon sings one of the songs he wrote for the musical. The investors all turn in their checks. George refuses to allow the musical unless he can do the singing himself. The investors give George a chance to sing a song. Everyone takes their checks back. At the end of the episode, George and Gracie sing and dance a duet of "I love her, that's why". Lewis Martin as Mr. Loomis. Note: This episode's vaudeville Afterpiece is titled "Gracie's Father."
179	7	"Ronnie Moves to the Village"	Frederick De Cordova	Harvey Helm, Keith Fowler, Norman Paul, William Burns	November 14, 1955
Gracie tells Blanche and Harry that Ronnie wants to share a Greenwich Village apartment with fellow actor Jim Boardman and his father Archie (Frank Wilcox). Gracie is opposed to Ronnie's leaving and living the starving artist lifestyle. George does a monologue about actors living in basements, George's poor family living in a basement and people thinking suffering makes their art better. George believes Ronnie is mostly interested in his dating prospects in the Village. Ronnie is bringing Jim over for dinner and to meet his parents. He warns Jim that his parents are comedians on television. Gracie decorates the place in an "artsy" style so Ronnie will see he doesn't have to leave. When Ronnie and Jim arrive, they find Gracie, George and Harry von Zell sitting on the floor. Later, Ronnie tells Jim that he won't be moving after he saw how much effort Gracie went to, to keep him home. Not knowing this, Harry von Zell tells Gracie she used the wrong approach. She should make Ronnie think she wants him to go, and then he'll probably stay. That backfires and Ronnie says he will now move. When George finds out it was von Zell's idea, he fires him. Gracie tells Blanche that she'd like to check up on Ronnie without him knowing it. It turns out Mr. Boardman is not a starving artist and is actually quite wealthy. Gracie drops by the Boardman place dressed as a model and calls herself Mona Lisa. Ronnie sees her and when he's alone with Mr. Boardman, he tells him who she is. Mr. Boardman decides to play along with Gracie. George comes by with some bags of food. Ronnie decides to stay home. But when George sees how well Archie lives, he tells Gracie he's staying with the Boardman's for 2 weeks. Note: This episode's vaudeville Afterpiece is titled "Aunt Clara's Husbands." This was a lengthy routine in which Gracie spoke about each of Clara's nine husbands - they only had time for five of them, so it was continued the following week.
180	8	"Gracie Helps Lola"	Frederick De Cordova	Harvey Helm, Keith Fowler, Norman Paul, William Burns	November 21, 1955
Ronnie is to bring Mr. Channing (Thomas Browne Henry), the head of the Dramatic School, over to meet Gracie and George. Meanwhile, Lola (Barbara Knudson) the waitress is down in the dumps because her boyfriend Al the cab driver (Peter Leeds) hasn't proposed marriage after 6 years together. Ronnie is concerned that George makes a good impression. George does a monologue about good impressions, children disliking school and Ronnie as a child. Gracie tells Lola that she needs to make herself more attractive to other men. And while she is out doing that, Gracie will fill in for her waitress job. George is having lunch with Mr. Channing and things do not go well when Gracie waits on their table. Harry von Zell tells the Morton's that Gracie wants him to take Lola out. Harry doesn't want to do it. Morton and Blanche get into an argument when Morton tells her that she's not that attractive. Harry von Zell tells Gracie that he won't take Lola out. But when Lola arrives and is all made up, von Zell changes his mind. Gracie makes sure the couple get into Al's cab. In the end, von Zell gets beat up, Al proposes to Lola, George gets a lot of bills and because he feels sorry that Ronnie has the parents he does, Mr. Channing gives Ronnie a great dramatic part. Dick Elliott appears as a Stout Man in the Restaurant. Note: This episode's vaudeville Afterpiece is titled "Aunt Clara's Husbands." This is a continuation of a lengthy routine about each of Clara's nine husbands which they didn't have time to finish the previous week.
181	9	"Anniversary Party"	Frederick De Cordova	Harvey Helm, Keith Fowler, Norman Paul, William Burns	November 28, 1955
It's George's and Gracie's anniversary, and a party is planned. While George is getting party favors inside a store, Gracie and Harry von Zell are outside talking. Gracie mentions that her and George decided to not exchange gifts. But she wouldn't mind if she got a pearl necklace and asks von Zell to say something to George about it. When Harry mentions the necklace, George fires him. George does a monologue about his and Gracie's anniversary, what it takes to make him look good at his age and what to do to make a marriage last. Both George and Gracie ask Blanche to hide the present they bought. Blanche gets frustrated when she tries to talk to Harry and he doesn't pay attention. Meanwhile, Ronnie wants to try out for a dramatic part where he is to play an older man. Archie Boardman drops by and tells George and Gracie he won't be able to make the party as he and his wife (Fay Baker) had an argument. Mrs. Boardman thinks there's something going on between Archie and his new model. Gracie has Mrs. Boardman over and tries to show her she needn't be jealous. Gracie enlists Blanche in her scheme to show Mrs. Boardman that she is never jealous of George. This causes an argument between Blanche and Harry and Blanche won't be at the party that evening. Gracie's plan somehow works and Mrs. Boardman leaves to go and make up with her husband. But something else happens and Gracie is now mad at George. That evening, George is the only one at the party. Ronnie shows up and then Gracie and she makes up with George. Note: This episode's vaudeville Afterpiece is titled "Shopping at Macy's."
182	10	"George Becomes a Dictator"	Frederick De Cordova	Harvey Helm, Keith Fowler, Norman Paul, William Burns	December 5, 1955
George gets Ronnie a job on the Jackie Gleason Show because George wants him to pursue comedy. The Mortons give George a hard time for making decisions for Ronnie, especially as he wants to be a dramatic actor. Ronnie tells Velma he doesn't want to do the show, but he doesn't know how to tell his father. Ronnie decides to stay with the play he's now rehearsing and not do Jackie Gleason. George does a monologue about discipline in families. Ronnie talks to Gracie about his dilemma and he hopes Gracie will tell George he's staying with the play. Gracie misunderstands and goes to tell director Mr. Howard (Hayden Rorke) that Ronnie can't be in the play. Gracie and "Doctor" Harry von Zell try to tell Mr. Howard that Ronnie has laryngitis. George now believes Ronnie turned down the part in the play. Ronnie tells George that he didn't turn down the part. After the two discuss it, George gives his support for Ronnie's career choice. The Morton's still think that George is making Ronnie do the Gleason show. They apologize when George turns on the TV and they see Ronnie in the dramatic play. Note: This episode's vaudeville Afterpiece is titled "Sightseeing Tour."
183	11	"Ronnie's Elopement"	Frederick De Cordova	Harvey Helm, Keith Fowler, Norman Paul, William Burns	December 12, 1955
Harry von Zell is trying to make time with attractive hotel cigarette girl Marie Rigney (Myrna Hansen), but is getting nowhere. She seems to be infatuated with Ronnie. Blanche mentions to Gracie that all the men flock around Marie. Blanche gets upset and jealous when she thinks that Harry took up smoking because of Marie. For fun, George tries to make Gracie jealous by smoking a cigarette, but it doesn't work. George does a monologue about Gracie not being the jealous type, pretty girls being able to sell anything and give and take in happy marriages. Peter the waiter tells Gracie that Marie really likes Ronnie. Marie gives Gracie a vague message about Ronnie's tickets for a trip to Connecticut. Blanche tells Gracie that Ronnie may be planning to elope with Marie. Blanche suggests that Gracie should talk to Marie and her parents. Gracie tells Mr. and Mrs. Rigney (James Flavin and Isabel Withers) that their daughter is eloping with Ronnie. Ronnie tells George about a conversation he just had with Gracie where she made it sound as though he were getting married. The Rigneys confront George and he explains how Ronnie is going to Connecticut to see a play with a friend of his. Note: This episode's vaudeville Afterpiece is titled "Doctor's Office."
184	12	"Company for Christmas"	Frederick De Cordova	Harvey Helm, Keith Fowler, Norman Paul, William Burns	December 19, 1955
Gracie has an amusing conversation with Peter the waiter. George learns that Ronnie's friend Jim Boardman wants to write a play. George offers his help with comedy. Jim wants to make stage plays about the gritty realism in life and is now writing about the coal miners in South Wales. George does a monologue about playing in the snow as a child and Ronnie and Jim treating George as though he were an old relic. Blanche tells Gracie she invited her brother Roger over for Christmas, but she doesn't want Harry to know. Knowing the hotel is almost booked solid, Blanche asks Gracie if she might be able to get a room for Roger. Meanwhile, Harry Morton is booking a room for his Father and wants to keep it from Blanche as the two don't get along. Gracie finds out that Harry booked a room and believes he knows about Roger and booked it for him. Harry and Blanche have a fight when they each find out about the relatives. Harry von Zell suggests that Gracie get a room for Roger and Harry's father to share. Maybe to two will become friends and ease the tension between Harry and Blanche. Gracie tries to get the room by having belligerent guest Mr. Arthur J. Cahill (Douglass Dumbrille) leave the hotel. But Peter ruins her plans. Ronnie and Jim tell George they want to work in a Pennsylvania coal mine to absorb the atmosphere. In the end, Harry's father and Roger can't make the trip. Gracie gives her and George's room to an elderly couple. Note: This episode's vaudeville Afterpiece is titled "Christmas with Gracie's Family." VHS release 1992
185	13	"Gracie Pawns Her Ring"	Frederick De Cordova	Harvey Helm, Keith Fowler, Norman Paul, William Burns	December 26, 1955
Gracie shows off the diamond ring George gave her for Christmas to Blanche and Peter the waiter. Ronnie and his friend Jim want funding for their new play. Harry Morton and von Zell have read the play and tell George it's pretty bad. George does a monologue about over-rating the value of money, women causing trouble, and not worrying about the troubles of the day. The boys want to get George in a good mood. Ronnie tells Jim that George puffs his cigar to signal the audience to laugh, which is exactly what Ronnie and Jim do while George smokes. George catches on quickly, and tells them that a really big laugh makes his cigar explode. After reading their play, George refuses to fund the play. Gracie decides to pawn her diamond ring to finance the play. She tells Ronnie and Jim that George loved the play and hands them the money. Ronnie thanks George for the money. George figures out where Gracie got the money. Pretending that he really gave the money, George insists he play the lead and sing in the production. He then tells the boys the play is no good and Ronnie returns the money. Herb Vigran appears as The Cab Driver. Note: This episode's vaudeville Afterpiece is titled "Insurance Company Routine."
186	14	"Appearances are Deceiving"	Frederick De Cordova	Harvey Helm, Keith Fowler, Norman Paul, William Burns	January 2, 1956
Ronnie is rehearsing a scene and is having a hard time knowing his lines. Mary Brewster (Lisa Gaye) arrives to rehearse the play with him. Mary tells Ronnie and Gracie that her puritanical father is coming from Omaha. He doesn't like Mary living alone in New York. George does a monologue about how writing his book has opened a whole new world for him, being an author keeps him busy and then he reads some fan mail letters. Harry von Zell comes by and George gets him to play a dead uncle for a scene Ronnie and Mary are doing. Olga the maid comes in and when Ronnie says "He's been murdered", she runs out screaming. William J. Brewster (John Hoyt) runs into Gracie by the elevator and she brings him to her suite. When Mr. Brewster arrives the two are rehearsing a love scene and he mistakes it for the real thing. Brewster drags Mary out of the room, saying he's taking her back to Omaha. Harry Morton tells George what happened to Mary. Harry von Zell tells Gracie and Blanche he has a scheme to teach Brewster a lesson and keep Mary in New York. They will put Brewster and Blanche in a similar compromising situation. Things don't quite go as planned, but Brewster comes to realize he was wrong and Mary can stay. Note: This episode's vaudeville Afterpiece is titled "Post Office - Hazel's Cake."
187	15	"Let's Dance"	Frederick De Cordova	Harvey Helm, Keith Fowler, Norman Paul, William Burns	January 9, 1956
Harry von Zell is still trying to get a date with hotel cigarette girl Marie. Ronnie has a date with Marie to go to a charity dance for his school. Gracie takes out an expensive ad in Ronnie's charity dance program without telling George. Mr. Channing comes by to speak with Ronnie and Gracie about the add and he mentions that ticket sales are slow. After hearing from Mr. Channing about the ad and then listening to one of Gracie's stories about how she needs some money, George agrees to pay for the ad. George does a monologue about how Ronnie tries to hide George's comedy profession from his classmates and George talks about his dancing. Harry Morton tells Blanche that he's not going to the dance. He then tells her a story of his youth to justify his decision. Because of something von Zell says, Gracie uses Marie as bait to boost ticket sales. Gracie winds up with a room full of men waiting to go to the dance with Marie. When they find out Marie is going with Ronnie, they all want their money back. Gracie runs off and George pays the men all off. Note: This episode's vaudeville Afterpiece is titled "Uncle Ottis' Farm."
188	16	"George Goes Skiing"	Frederick De Cordova	Harvey Helm, Keith Fowler, Norman Paul, William Burns	January 16, 1956
Ronnie and his friend Jim Boardman are taken skiing by Jim's father (Frank Wilcox). Jim laments that his father spends too much time with him. He even ruins their chance to spend some time with two girls they met, Sally Fletcher (Mary Webster) and Tina Clayton (Nancy Hadley). George does a monologue about not being much for the outdoors, skiing and sports being overdone. Ronnie, Jim and Mr. Boardman are back from their trip and come by Gracie's apartment. Gracie has a confusing conversation with Mr. Boardman. Gracie urges George to be a better father and spend more time with his son. George asks Harry von Zell if he has been a good father to Ronnie. When von Zell says no, George fires him. Meanwhile, Harry Morton tells Blanche how close he was with his father. They would regularly go butterfly hunting together. Gracie is upset with George because he's been gone for a couple days. He was actually practicing his skiing so he could go with Ronnie. George returns with his arm in a sling. Ronnie, not knowing where George was, tells him how happy he is that his father isn't like Mr. Boardman. Ronnie mentions how Mr. Boardman is always hanging around and spoiling their fun. Note: This episode's vaudeville Afterpiece is titled "Drugstore."
189	17	"Ronnie Gets an Agent"	Frederick De Cordova	Harvey Helm, Keith Fowler, Norman Paul, William Burns	January 23, 1956
Gracie and George are planning a dinner party for Ronnie's friend Sally Fletcher (Nancy Hadley). Her high society parents (Walter Woolf King and Frances Mercer) are also invited. Ronnie doesn't want any embarrassment with George telling jokes and trying to be funny. A fight erupts between George and his son when unscrupulous talent agent Jack Devlin (Lyle Talbot) offers Ronnie a contract. George does a monologue about the best way to avoid an argument is to run away from it, there are good and bad agents and making quick decisions without thinking. Ronnie goes to see Jack Devlin. In reality the talent agent is less interested in Ronnie, than he is in having George put some of his acts on George's show. Devlin talks Ronnie into signing a 7 year contract. After finding out what happened, Gracie asks Devlin to tear up Ronnie's contract, and hauls Harry von Zell along to pose as George. Devlin is not fooled by von Zell. While the two are still in Devlin's office, George solves the problem by telephoning Devlin and telling him that Ronnie is underage and he can't hold him to the contract. Because Gracie didn't know who was on the phone, Devlin tricks her into having George see some of his other acts in exchange for giving up the contract. Turns out Gracie did know it was George on the phone. That evening, the Fletchers are there for dinner along with the Mortons. Everyone is surprised when Gracie lets in some Acrobats that Devlin sent over. Jack Benny has a cameo at the end. Lois Collier as Miss Dixon. Note: This episode's vaudeville Afterpiece is titled "Fishing Routine."
190	18	"Politeness Never Pays"	Frederick De Cordova	Harvey Helm, Keith Fowler, Norman Paul, William Burns	January 30, 1956
Gracie and Blanche notice how gallant Ronnie is with his friend Ann Marlowe. They wish their husbands would be that way, as they were during their courtship. George does a monologue about being courteous to a woman, women expect too much, George was always polite to Gracie and his family always had good manners when he was little. Harry von Zell suggests to the women that maybe their husbands aren't as romantic anymore because they don't make an effort to be more attractive. Meanwhile, Harry Morton's father (Russell Hicks) is due to arrive and he and Blanche do not get along. Morton asks George if he can have his father stop at George's apartment first so he can prepare Blanche. George comes back to his apartment to find Gracie all dressed up and wearing very long fake eyelashes. Harry von Zell tells George that he overheard Gracie hiring a Gigolo (Maurice Marsac) to teach George how to be romantic again. George fires von Zell for being a stool pigeon and for giving away too much of the plot. Gracie mistakes Mr. Morton, Sr. for the gigolo and tells him she expected a much younger man. George arrives and tells Gracie that the man is Morton's father. Morton then shows up with a very dowdy looking Blanche. The gigolo arrives adding to the confusion. Later after everyone else has left, Ronnie comes home. Gracie mentions how nice he was to Ann. He tells her that when one isn't interested in someone you show them a lot of attention. But with someone one cares about you treat them very casually. This causes a problem when George is polite to Gracie. Note: This episode's vaudeville Afterpiece is titled "Gracie's Musical Family."
191	19	"Alice Gets Married"	Frederick De Cordova	Harvey Helm, Keith Fowler, Norman Paul, William Burns	February 6, 1956
Harry von Zell tells Gracie and Blanche that Alice (Jean Willes), his old girlfriend, is coming to New York. He believes that she plans to propose marriage and he wants to stay single. Harry doesn't know, but Alice is actually married to Don Emory (Robert Bray). Alice and Don meet up with George to discuss von Zell. George does a monologue about comparing rich and handsome Don to Harry, the reason a man stays a bachelor is because he's conceited and actors with egos. After von Zell flirts with Marie Rigney (Myrna Hansen), the cigarette girl, Gracie plans to tell Alice that Harry is married to Marie. Danny the Elevator Boy overhears Gracie and the rumor starts to spread. Ronnie and Marie have a date for that night. Harry Morton overhears their date plans. He is then told by the Doorman (Don Dillaway) that Marie is married to someone in the building. Morton tries to tell Gracie that Ronnie is dating a married woman, but he has a confusing conversation with Gracie. Morton then tells George, who makes a joke of it. Gracie tries to talk to Ronnie about the situation, but George comes by and explains things to Gracie. Harry von Zell finally meets Don and then is sad that Alice married someone besides him. Note: This episode's vaudeville Afterpiece is titled "Pet Shop Routine."
192	20	"George Needs Glasses"	Frederick De Cordova	Harvey Helm, Keith Fowler, Norman Paul, William Burns	February 13, 1956
Gracie and Blanche have been shopping. Gracie brings home a lot of packages which she tries to hide from George. George pretends to not see them. George tells Ronnie the reason he did that was to get Gracie in a good mood. He wants to return to California for a couple days to visit his friends at the Friar's Club. After a convoluted conversation about seeing a movie, Gracie wants George to have his eyes checked. George does a monologue about Gracie always having to buy something, missing the guys at the Friar's Club, needing a rest and a foreign film he just saw. Gracie visits Dr. Bradley (Raymond Bailey), the optometrist, with Harry von Zell. Gracie wants von Zell to take the eye test for George. After Dr. Bradley talks to von Zell for a while, he tells Gracie that he believes von Zell has cracked up. Gracie presumes George's refusal to wear glasses is a matter of male vanity. Gracie buys three dozen glasses and asks all of her friends to wear them as an example for George. Ronnie tries to explain to Gracie that George wants to see his friends in California. Mr. Sheridan (Noel Drayton), from British TV, comes by to speak with George. Mr. Sheridan happens to actually wear glasses. Harry Morton and von Zell each try to convince George that there's nothing wrong with wearing glasses. Mr. Sheridan tells Gracie they would like to renew George's contract. George comes by and when he sees Mr. Sheridan with glasses, he thinks Gracie put him up to it. George gives him some money and sends him away. George later realizes who Mr. Sheridan was and will have dinner with him to talk things over. Note: This episode's vaudeville Afterpiece is titled "Gracie's Athletic Family."
193	21	"The Indian Potentate"	Frederick De Cordova	Harvey Helm, Keith Fowler, Norman Paul, William Burns	February 20, 1956
Gracie and Blanche learn that an Indian Maharajah (Donald Randolph) is staying at the hotel. The Maharajah's retinue has taken over an entire floor in the hotel. He's in town to visit his daughter Myia (Marla English). Myia tells her father that she has a date with Ronnie Burns, whom she met in the elevator. Gracie and Blanche are in an elevator with the Maharajah. But they don't know who he is, as he's dressed in a suit and tie. He enjoys their conversation about him. He tries to introduce himself, but they think he's flirting with them. George does a monologue about the Maharajah and his wealth. When Ronnie admires Myia's car, she offers to give it him. Myra refers to his acting role model Marlon Brando as "the American Sabu". Gracie and Blanche try to get to the Maharajah's floor with no luck. Harry von Zell suggests that Gracie and Blanche disguise themselves as Eastern Princesses. They even get Harry von Zell to dress up. When Ronnie says he is bringing Myia to dinner, Harry Morton instructs George on proper etiquette around the Maharajah. George and Morton see Gracie, Blanche and von Zell dressed up. They get into the elevator with them, pretending to not recognize them. George and Morton then have a little fun at their expense. At dinner time, the Burns and Mortons mistake Tigor the Servant (Peter Mamakos) for the Maharajah. Everything gets straightened out when the Maharajah shows up. Mel Welles appears as The Guard. Note: This episode's vaudeville Afterpiece is titled "Aunt Clara's Husbands and Redecorating."
194	22	"The Ladies' Club"	Frederick De Cordova	Harvey Helm, Keith Fowler, Norman Paul, William Burns	February 27, 1956
Harry Morton tells Blanche that the women who belong to an elite women's club are the wives of very influential businessmen that could help him. He would like Blanche to join the club. Harry is terrified that his career will be ruined if Gracie joins the club, so he asks Blanche to not let Gracie know about it. Mrs. Gladys Winstrell (Katherine Warren) from the club comes to see Blanche. Gladys is on the nominating committee. There is the usual confusion when Gracie also stops by. George does a monologue about letting Gracie join clubs, how useful women's clubs are and men conducting business at their clubs. Meanwhile, Ronnie explains to Gracie about Stanislavski Method acting where one uses imaginary props. George enters the room and joins them in the Method acting. Harry von Zell drops by and is confused by what the three are doing. Later, Harry Morton joins George and von Zell for lunch. He tells them that Blanche is joining the Ladies of Oyster Bay club. George tells Morton that Gracie is joing as well and Morton insists that George stop her. Mrs. Millicent Sohmers (Doris Packer) comes by to see Gracie and tells her about the club. Millicent has an amusing conversation with Gracie. Ronnie drops by and Millicent is confused when he practices some of the Method acting in front of her. George arrives and as he walks Millicent to the door, she says that Gracie can't be in the club. When she describes what Ronnie did, George pretends to smoke in front of her. Note: This episode's vaudeville Afterpiece is titled "Nature Studies."
195	23	"Cyrano de Bergerac"	Frederick De Cordova	Harvey Helm, Keith Fowler, Norman Paul, William Burns	March 5, 1956
Ronnie lands the lead in a production of Cyrano de Bergerac. But he worries that he lacks the talent to play the part. George does a monologue about being sensitive when you're younger and gaining confidence. George then gets a phone call from a girl that teased him when he was younger. A Waiter (William Schallert) comes by to bring lunch. He is surprised when he sees Ronnie wearing his Cyrano nose and Jim wearing Gracie's blonde wig. Blanche's niece Linda (Ann Stebbins) arrives from Seattle and looks forward to meeting Ronnie. Harry Morton has a whole list of places he wants to take Linda. Linda meets Ronnie wearing his Cyrano nose and leaves quickly. Linda tells Blanche she going back to Seattle the next day. Ronnie's parents and friends go to great lengths to boost his confidence. Later, Linda sees Ronnie without the false nose. Instead of sightseeing in New York as her uncle intended, Linda goes out to dinner with Ronnie. Note: This episode's vaudeville Afterpiece is titled "Fortune Teller."
196	24	"The Stolen Plants"	Frederick De Cordova	Harvey Helm, Keith Fowler, Norman Paul, William Burns	March 12, 1956
While sitting in Central Park, Gracie tells Blanche that Ronnie has taken up fencing for his part in Cyrano de Bergerac. Gracie then has a confusing conversation with a gardener there. Back at the apartment, Ronnie is fencing and Harry von Zell comes by to talk to George. Michelle Nelson, Ronnie's fencing instructor, arrives and meets George and Harry. Gracie shows Harry Morton some flower bulbs she took from Central Park. He tells her that she has committed a crime. She decides to phone the police and turn herself in. George does a monologue about people doing things without thinking, there are so many laws that you don't know when you're breaking them, women gardening and George knowing nothing about flowers. Sgt. Herbert Wilkins (John Gallaudet) comes by to talk to Gracie. He tells Gracie he couldn't possibly arrest her for taking the bulbs and suggests she go to the Park Commissioner. While he's there, he's surprised to see Ronnie and Michelle fencing. George shows up and then von Zell in a fencing outfit. Herbert mentions to George how strange things are in the apartment. Mr. Lambert (Howard McNear), of the Park Commission, tells Gracie that if the police won't do anything, neither can they. He asks her if she would feel better if she paid for the bulbs, which she does. Bert Keith (Dabbs Greer), from the Daily News, hears that Gracie bought the bulbs and wants to write a story about how Lambert is selling taxpayer property. George straightens everything out between Lambert and Keith, while Ronnie, von Zell and Michelle are fencing. Gracie comes by with more plants she took from the park. Note: This episode's vaudeville Afterpiece is titled "Grand Central Station."
197	25	"The English Playwright"	Frederick De Cordova	Harvey Helm, Keith Fowler, Norman Paul, William Burns	March 19, 1956
There is a little confusion between George, Gracie and Harry von Zell about how Ronnie's performance was the night before. And when Ronnie asks George and von Zell their opinions, they stretch the truth a little. George does a monologue about lying gracefully and being a good diplomat. Ronnie tells Gracie that English playwright Raymond Curtis (Paul Cavanagh) is staying at the hotel. He's in town to cast his latest play and Ronnie would love to be in it. Gracie runs into Raymond in the hotel restaurant and mentions how Ronnie wants to be in his play. Raymond tells her all the parts have been cast except the one for a 30 year old married woman. He promised the part to an actress who supports her widowed mother. Gracie then tells Raymond that she is a widow and Ronnie supports her. Raymond says he could add a new character and he'll meet Ronnie. Raymond would also like to have dinner with Gracie. Gracie gets George out of the apartment by saying Harry Morton wants to see him. Raymond comes by to see Gracie and Ronnie walks in. Raymond again mentions having dinner in his apartment and Gracie says she'd like to bring the "Widow Morton" along. George walks in and pretends to be a Mr. Johnson. Raymond talks George into being Blanche's date. That night Blanche is excited about meeting her date and then she sees it's George. When Ronnie shows up pretending to be a waiter, Gracie's hoax is revealed. Mr. Curtis finds the whole thing quite amusing. Note: This episode's vaudeville Afterpiece is titled "Gracie's Mother."
198	26	"A Weekend on Long Island"	Frederick De Cordova	Harvey Helm, Keith Fowler, Norman Paul, William Burns	March 26, 1956
Blanche and Harry invite Mrs. Sohmers to lunch as a thanks for her invitation to spend the weekend on Long Island. Despite looking forward to the trip, Blanche says she'll miss Gracie. Blanche did mention Mrs. Sohmers invitation to Gracie. Ronnie and his class would like to hold a surprise party for Mr. Channing (Thomas Browne Henry) in the Burns' suite. Ronnie asks Gracie if she could make sure that George isn't around so he won't do his act. Despite not actually being invited, Gracie tells Ronnie she'll take George to Long Island with the Morton's. George does a monologue about going to Oyster Bay for the weekend, mixing with high society, feeling sentimental after a few drinks and Hollywood parties. Gracie tells Mrs. Sohmers she excepts her invitation for the weekend. Mrs. Sohmers believes she can straighten out Gracie's convoluted logic, but the conversation gets even more confused, to the point Mrs. Sohmers thinks she is invited to a party with the Burnses. Harry von Zell suggests Gracie tell George he doesn't look well and they should go to Florida so he can get healthy. George tells Harry to come up with a better plan. Between kissing, Ronnie and Patricia Cowley make plans for the party. Gracie has George pack for a trip, but she won't tell him where they're going. Gracie takes George across the hall to the Morton's apartment. George and Gracie crash Ronnie's private party, and George sings. Mrs. Sohmers then shows up. Note: This episode's vaudeville Afterpiece is titled "The Zoo."
199	27	"The Newlyweds"	Frederick De Cordova	Harvey Helm, Keith Fowler, Norman Paul, William Burns	April 2, 1956
Emily Vanderlip (Elinor Donahue) is coming for a visit and the Morton's and Gracie believe she needs to be chaperoned. What they don't know is that Emily has eloped with Airman Second Class Frank Foster (Robert Ellis). They eloped in spite of her parents wanting the couple to wait until Frank completed his military service. Ronnie already knows they eloped, but tries to cover up when Gracie meets Frank. Gracie catches Frank and Emily kissing. Ronnie has to drive Frank back to the base as he forgot his pass. Emily's parents rented a separate hotel room for her visit to New York, but Gracie, not knowing Emily is married, insists she stay in the Burns suite. Gracie then sends George to sleep in Emily's hotel room. Frank, finding George sleeping in Emily's hotel room, confesses everything. George does a monologue about Frank not being with Emily on their honeymoon, bringing up a daughter and parents believing their children are better than the people they marry. George manages to set up some alone time for Emily and Frank. Mr. Maddis tells Gracie that Frank just went for drive with his wife. Gracie, misunderstanding, decides to speak to Frank's General (Morris Ankrum). The General explains to Gracie that Frank is married to Emily. Gracie tells Frank and Emily that she called Mrs. Vanderlip and she's very happy about the wedding. Ross Elliott appears as The Captain. Note: This episode's vaudeville Afterpiece is titled "Easter Parade."
200	28	"Night of Vaudeville"	Frederick De Cordova	Harvey Helm, Keith Fowler, Norman Paul, William Burns	April 9, 1956
Ronnie's drama school is losing money and decides to put on its usual production of "Othello" to raise funds. George talks Mr. Channing into doing a variety show instead, with the type of vaudeville skits that Gracie and George used to do. At first the students are against doing comedy, but Ronnie talks them into it. Diane Jergens appears as Diane. Judy Clark appears as Sophie Tucker. Note: Among the highlights: Ronnie and a schoolmate performing a Burns and Allen routine; Gracie's one and only dramatic moment in the entire series, perhaps her entire career; George getting his due as a vaudeville expert (rather than simply being subjected to the endless put downs he normally gets); Gracie emceeing the show-within-a-show all by herself (she very rarely performed without George); and several pastiches of classic vaudeville acts, like Eddie Cantor's and Sophie Tucker's. This episode has been removed from syndication because there are two skits were the actors wore black-face. As of Nov. 2021 this episode can still be viewed on YouTube.
201	29	"Burlesk"	Frederick De Cordova	Harvey Helm, Keith Fowler, Norman Paul, William Burns	April 16, 1956
Everyone praises George for the way he directed the show at Ronnie's school the previous evening. But when he accepts the Morton's compliments he's accused of having an inflated ego. George does a monologue about the Morton's not being fair weather friends and compliments. Ronnie and his friend Jim Boardman apply for employment at a house of burlesque. Mr. Boardman tries to tell Gracie he is not happy about his son's decision, but the conversation gets confusing. Mr. Boardman then talks to George and says it's George's fault because he put Jim in the show last night. Ronnie comes in and tells George and Mr. Boardman that Jim was turned down, but he was given a 3 month contract. George is surprised Ronnie wants to do comedy instead of dramatic acting. George doesn't want Ronnie to do burlesque. Gracie wants to keep an eye on Ronnie at the burlesque theater. Her and Blanche dress up as dancers. Eddie 'Bozo Schultz' Wilson (Jack Albertson) asks them what they are doing there. George and Harry Morton come by and George remembers Eddie from the old days. Sylvia Lewis as Goldie. Note: This episode's vaudeville Afterpiece is titled "Travel Bureau."
202	30	"The Right People"	Frederick De Cordova	Harvey Helm, Keith Fowler, Norman Paul, William Burns	April 23, 1956
Pat (Carolyn Craig), the daughter of socially-conscious snob Mrs. Millicent Sohmers has been out on several dates with Ronnie. Gracie starts a rumor that Ronnie will be marrying into the Sohmers family. George does a monologue about romance, springtime and marrying for money. Mrs. Sohmers would rather Pat became engaged to someone of her family's social status, like Dick Sloan. Millicent asks Blanche to help explain to Gracie how she feels about Ronnie and Pat dating. The usual confusion ensues. Pat confides to Ronnie that Dick has asked her to marry him and Pat would like Ronnie's impression of Dick. Ronnie thinks Dick would be perfect for her. Harry von Zell explains to Gracie how Millicent doesn't feel Gracie knows the right people. Wealthy Alfred Tyler Griffin (Hayden Rorke) asks Gracie for an autograph for his son. Millicent comes to believe that the Burns family is well connected in society. So, when Pat announces she will marry Dick, Millicent wants to talk her into marrying Ronnie. Note: This episode's vaudeville Afterpiece is titled "The Library - Lucy Crown."
203	31	"The Magic Act"	Frederick De Cordova	Harvey Helm, Keith Fowler, Norman Paul, William Burns	April 30, 1956
Edward Colton (Damian O'Flynn), a theatrical agent, is offering Ronnie a movie contract. Because of the length of the contract, Ronnie would like to think about it. Gracie misunderstands a phone call and thinks that George was offered a movie role without her and that he's turning it down. Gracie tells Blanche and Harry what George did. Blanche tells George what a nice thing he did in turning down the movie. To have some fun with them, George tells them he took the movie without Gracie and signed a 7 year contract. George does a monologue about how he couldn't take a part without Gracie and he couldn't take a role in a western movie. Not wanting to hold George back, Gracie first tells him she's retiring, then she says she's teaming up with Harry von Zell. Knowing what Gracie is doing, George plays along. George tries to explain things to Gracie, but doesn't get the chance. Gracie decides to get a job with magician Mendoza The Great (Harry Mendoza). Her job is to assist the magician and look amazed at Mendoza's tricks. During a performance, Mendoza tries to make Gracie disappear in a cabinet. She gets things mixed up and after some confusion, George, Gracie and Ronnie appear in the cabinet. George gets to explain to Gracie that the movie contract is for Ronnie. Note: This episode's vaudeville Afterpiece is titled "Aunt Bridget - The Artist."
204	32	"A Paris Creation"	Frederick De Cordova	Harvey Helm, Keith Fowler, Norman Paul, William Burns	May 7, 1956
Gracie wants to alter her new dress by herself. Not knowing the dress is by Paris dress designer Gaston Broussard (Steven Geray), George tells her to take it to the designer to get it altered. George and Gracie will be going to Paris, along with Ronnie and the Mortons. George does a monologue about Paris and things to do there and things he's done there. A disguised Harry von Zell is on the plane and he wants to surprise George and Gracie. Coincidentally, Broussard is also on the plane with his friend Yvette (Jacqueline Beer). Both George and Broussard have identical briefcases with the initials "GB" on them. While Gaston is sleeping, Yvette goes to sit with Ronnie. Yvette sees George's briefcase and takes it, thinking it is Gaston's. Gracie sees the briefcase with Gaston and takes it, thinking it is George's. George sits with the disguised von Zell, who claims to be a French scientist. George plays along with von Zell for a time. After they land, the briefcase mix-up is straightened out and Broussard fixes Gracie's dress. Comedian Benny Rubin appears as an English man standing in line when they disembark in Paris. Adelle August appears as Joan The Stewardess. Note: This episode's vaudeville Afterpiece is titled "The Auto Show."
205	33	"Back from Paris"	Frederick De Cordova	Harvey Helm, Keith Fowler, Norman Paul, William Burns	May 14, 1956
George does a monologue about what will be happening in the show. Still in Paris, Gracie and Blanche talk about how Gracie's decided to open her own dress shop. Gracie hasn't told George about it. Gracie tells Blanche that she can be manager and top model for the store. Gaston Broussard will sell Gracie his creations for the store. Meanwhile, Ronnie's in love with Yvette and both are sad as Ronnie will be leaving soon. George buys an original painting from an artist. George does a short monologue about artists leading a romantic life. Yvette learns she will be going to New York to model the dresses at Gracie's store. Gracie has a confusing time at the airport customs. George finds out about the dress shop from Broussard. On the plane, Harry von Zell tries to make time with Joan the Stewardess. George confronts Gracie about the dress shop, but she avoids the subject. Something Gracie says ruins von Zell's chances with Joan. Back at home, Gracie tells George she will need $1000 for a painting she bought. It is the same painting that George bought for $50. George tells the audience to watch next weeks show to see how Gracie gets the money she needs to open the shop. John Wengraf appears as 1st Customs Officer. Eugene Borden appears as 2nd Customs Officer. Jean De Briac appears as Elderly Lover. Note: This episode's vaudeville Afterpiece is titled "The Backyard Circus."
206	34	"The Twenty-Four Dresses"	Frederick De Cordova	Harvey Helm, Keith Fowler, Norman Paul, William Burns	May 21, 1956
George refuses to give Gracie the money to open a dress shop with the wardrobe she bought in Paris. He insists on sending the dresses back to France. Gracie hides the dresses and puts newspapers in the dress boxes. But George figures out what she did. George does a monologue about Gracie not having the experience to run a shop and women don't belong in business. Gracie enlists Harry Von Zell to intercept the inventory before it is mailed and hide it in Blanches apartment. Harry Morton finds the dresses and returns them to George. Gracie convinces Ronnie to get the dresses by mentioning that Yvette will go back to France if there is no shop. She even manages to get Mrs. Sohmers to finance the store. Gracie sells her own dresses and keeps the ones from France for herself. She decides to get out the dress business and it still costs George money. Note: This episode's vaudeville Afterpiece is titled "The Flower Shop."
207	35	"Ronnie is Lovesick"	Frederick De Cordova	Harvey Helm, Keith Fowler, Norman Paul, William Burns	May 28, 1956
When Ronnie locks himself in his room to rehearse a role, Gracie thinks he's heartbroken because Yvette has gone back to Paris. Blanche tells Gracie if Ronnie met another beautiful girl, he might forget Yvette. Gracie decides to hire someone to be George's secretary. A new Doorman (Walter Woolf King) returns to George a script that was left in a cab. He was hoping to meet a woman in the building that kept his brother in stitches with the silly things she says. George knows he's referring to Gracie. George does a monologue about how bad the script was, not needing to exercise and people losing weight. Gracie hires beautiful model Mona Patterson (Kathleen Case) to pose as George's secretary. Not knowing what Gracie is up to, George tells her he doesn't need a secretary. Gracie still tries to get Ronnie and Mona together. Ronnie introduces Harry von Zell to Mona, and Gracie promptly gets rid of him. Gracie tells Mr. Boardman about Ronnie's love sickness. Mr. Boardman suggests to George that Ronnie find something to get his mind off of Yvette, such as butterfly collecting. When Ronnie gets his outfit for the part he's playing, Gracie thinks he's joining the Foreign Legion. George explains to Gracie that Ronnie is not love sick. Note: This episode's vaudeville Afterpiece is titled "The Beauty Show."
208	36	"The Night Out"	Frederick De Cordova	Harvey Helm, Keith Fowler, Norman Paul, William Burns	June 4, 1956
While helping Ronnie with the lines for a part he's playing, Gracie mentions to George that she trusts him. Harry von Zell comes by and borrows George's coat before going on a date. George tells von Zell that he's going to the Friar's Club to play Bridge and then get a massage. Late that night, Gracie wakes Blanche and tells her that George isn't home yet and she's worried. Turns out George fell asleep and accidentally got locked in for the night. George does a monologue about how much time he has to kill before the club opens up again. Gracie calls the police to report George missing and there is some confusion during Gracie's description of George. While on the phone with the police, George comes home. Harry von Zell apparently left George's coat at the Stork Club while on his date. The hat-check girl (Jil Jarmyn) from the club returns the coat to Gracie. She describes the woman who was with the man she believed to be George. Gracie says she's going to see a divorce lawyer. Blanche tells Harry Morton what happened and he will help bring the two together. Mr. Brewster (John Hoyt), a divorce lawyer, comes over. George explains to Mr. Brewster and Gracie that it was von Zell at the Stork Club. Harry Morton tells Gracie that it was he who borrowed the coat and went to the club. Thinking George is still lying, Gracie has Mr. Brewster come over again. George brings in a large group of witnesses to prove his story. Anthony Warde appears as Sgt. Gibney. Note: This episode's vaudeville Afterpiece is titled "Gracie's Family Graduating."
210	37	"The Triple Surprise Party"	Frederick De Cordova	Harvey Helm, Keith Fowler, Norman Paul, William Burns	June 11, 1956
George and Blanche plan a surprise party for Harry Morton and will have it at George's place. George tries to sidetrack loose-lipped Gracie to keep her from spoiling the surprise for Morton. He tells her the surprise party is for son Ronnie. When Gracie learns that Ronnie has a date with Felicia Norris (Lisa Gaye), she tells him he has to be home because they're having a surprise party for George. George does a monologue about the present he got Harry Morton, the type of gifts Gracie likes to give and presents he got as a child. Harry Von Zell is told by someone else that George is planning to surprise "Harry", and comes to believe the party is for him. Gracie finds the gifts George and Blanche bought for Morton. She doesn't think they are appropriate for Ronnie and exchanges them for something she thinks Ronnie will like. At the party, a confused Harry Morton opens the presents Gracie exchanged and Gracie rides around on a scooter. George explains things to everyone. Richard Deacon appears as Mr. Dayton. Note: This episode's vaudeville Afterpiece is titled "Uncle Harvey - The Repair Man."
209	38	"Questions and Answers"	Frederick De Cordova	Norman Paul, Harvey Helm, Keith Fowler, William Burns	September 10, 1956
Blanche has joined The Ladies of Oyster Bay Literary Club. Gracie would like to join as well. Ronnie tells George that the studio would like him to learn Judo for his part in the film. Harry Von Zell comes by and offers to teach Ronnie some Judo as he took it in college. Blanche tells Mrs. Sohmers that she'll resign from the Literary Club if Gracie isn't permitted membership. Blanche tells Harry Morton that in order for Gracie to get membership, she must pass a literary quiz. Mrs. Sohmers says to Blanche that she'll find a way for Gracie to pass. George does a monologue about Gracie and Blanche's friendship and other close friendships. Mrs. Sohmers decides to help Gracie cheat. While Gracie is speaking to Mrs. Sohmers, Ronnie throws von Zell around the room learning Judo. Gracie winds up memorizing the questions and not the answers. Mrs. Sohmers then decides to put the answers in various places around the apartment. That plan doesn't work out too well, but the ladies of the committee find Gracie so charming they let her join the club. Katherine Warren appears as Mrs. Winstrell. Note: This episode's vaudeville Afterpiece is titled "The Beach." (Originally scheduled for 11 June 56) This is one of the 40 episodes contracted for the 6th season of the show. CBS opted to air several months of reruns and delay the broadcast of the final season 6 episodes, which segued straight into season 7.
211	39	"Mrs. Sohmers Needs a Psychologist"	Frederick De Cordova	Norman Paul, Harvey Helm, Keith Fowler, William Burns	September 17, 1956
Gracie has driven Mrs. Sohmers to the brink of insanity. Mrs. Sohmers consults Psychologist Dr. D. L. Henricks (Dabbs Greer). After several sessions, Henricks believes Mrs. Sohmers can cope with the world and Gracie. While at a restaurant, Gracie tells George about the last meeting of the literary club. Harry von Zell comes by and tries to shock Gracie by pouring a glass of water into his pocket as a trick. Gracie doesn't even respond. George then plays a trick on Harry and leaves him the check. George does a monologue about the silly things people do to get attention and being a singer. Mrs. Sohmers tries to have a conversation with Gracie and it doesn't go well. After another session with Mrs. Sohmers, Dr. Henricks cannot believe anyone could say the things that Gracie supposedly says. He is convinced that Mrs. Sohmers is delusional. The Doctor would like to speak with one of Mrs. Sohmers friends and asks to talk to Blanche. Blanche can't make the appointment and sends Gracie instead. Thinking that Gracie is Blanche and after talking with her, Henricks believes Blanche is having problems as well. Harry von Zell tries the water trick on Gracie again, but it backfires on him. Henricks goes to the Burns apartment and thanks to George, there is even more confusion. Mary Lawrence appears as The Nurse. Note: This episode's vaudeville Afterpiece is titled "Cowboys and Rodeo."
212	40	"The Switchboard Operator"	Frederick De Cordova	Norman Paul, Harvey Helm, Keith Fowler, William Burns	September 24, 1956
Ronnie has a luncheon date with Sally (Mary Ellen Kay) the switchboard operator. George and Gracie eavesdrop on Ronnie's phone call with Sally. George does a monologue about how money went a long way in the old days. Harry Morton is offered a new position which would require him and Blanche to stay on the road for two years. Blanche does not want to travel and be away from Gracie for that long. Blanche and Gracie take over the hotel's switchboard operations to prevent Harry from placing a call to accept the job. Morton at first wants to take the job, but then changes his mind. Not knowing this, the girls take great delight in pranking George, Harry von Zell and Harry Morton. George and Harry Morton figure it out and turn the tables on them. Harry tells Blanche he will turn the job offer down. Patricia Hardy appears as Flo. Ross Elliott appears as Mr. Randolph. Note: This episode's vaudeville Afterpiece is titled "Superstition and Astrology."

=== Season 7 (1956–57) ===
No. overall	No. in season	Title	Directed by	Written by	Original release date
213	1	"Return to California"	Rod Amateau	Norman Paul, Harvey Helm, Keith Fowler, William Burns	October 1, 1956
Ronnie left for California 3 days ago and Gracie already misses him. Gracie, the Mortons, and Harry von Zell are all set to return as well, but George pretends he knows nothing about it. George does a monologue about how it's good to be back in California and how expensive it was living in a New York hotel for a year. Returning from New York earlier than expected, Gracie, Blanche and Harry surprise Ronnie, who is keeping company with 20 co-ed students. The boys live in the Burns house. Ronnie has made the Morton house available to the girls. George does a monologue about being poor when he was younger and their apartment wasn't very nice. George finds out about the boys staying at the house. He comes in the house to find the boys captivated by Gracie's stories. When George asks Gracie who all the boys are, she tells him they are the ones who redecorated the house. Harry von Zell offers to have George and Morton stay at his place for a while. Blanche and Gracie soon become part of the girl's group. But when the men get to von Zell's place, there are friends of Ronnie's in the apartment as well. Jody McCrea appears as Bill. Judi Meredith appears as Judi. Mary Webster appears as Linda. Robert Ellis appears as Charlie. Note: This episode's vaudeville Afterpiece is titled "The Pioneer in the Allen Family."
214	2	"The Shakespeare Paper"	Rod Amateau	Norman Paul, Harvey Helm, Keith Fowler, William Burns	October 8, 1956
Ronnie has to write a paper on a Shakespeare play. Meanwhile, Harry Von Zell begs George to get him an audition with producer William Goetz. Harry wants to play the part of a gangster. George does a monologue about gangsters and getting von Zell the part. Gracie decides to help Ronnie and goes to speak to his teacher Dr. Baxter to find out his favorite play. The teacher tells her it's King Lear. When Gracie finds out that Ronnie's paper is on the play Julius Caesar, she decides to rewrite Ronnie's paper. Ronnie starts to read his paper in class and realizes it's been completely altered. Dr. Baxter speaks to George about Ronnie's confusing paper. George says it's like that because Gracie helped. Blanche pretends to be Gracie and George plays along at first. Ronnie finds his original paper and gives it to Dr. Baxter. George tells von Zell that Baxter is William Goetz and gets Harry to audition in front of him. Shakespearean scholar and authority Dr. Frank C. Baxter appears as himself. Sandra Burns is briefly heard via telephone, but not seen. Note: This episode's vaudeville Afterpiece is titled "The Political Allens."
215	3	"The Woman in the Car"	Rod Amateau	Norman Paul, Harvey Helm, Keith Fowler, William Burns	October 15, 1956
Gracie puts a dent in their car and tries to hide it from George. George does a monologue about how wives and husbands shouldn't have secrets between each other and how well Gracie takes care of the car. Gracie then borrows Blanche and Harry Morton's car, getting a parking ticket in the process. The police officer (Dennis King Jr.) leaves an unusual note on the ticket that causes Blanche to suspect Harry of having an affair with a "very cooperative" woman. Gracie wants to help Blanche find out who the woman was, so she hires Private Detective Shaw (Anthony Warde) to look into it. Shaw comes back with a description of the woman and George immediately recognizes her as Gracie. George confirms with Ronnie that Gracie was in the Morton's car. Meanwhile, Harry Morton invites Gracie to a restaurant to try to have her convince Blanche there is no other woman. Shaw's assistant, who has been following Harry, sees the two of them together. George tells Blanche that the woman in the car was actually Gracie. When the assistant tells Blanche what he saw at the restaurant, Blanche believes George was lying to help Harry. Note: This episode's vaudeville Afterpiece is titled "Home Remedies."
216	4	"The Interview"	Rod Amateau	Norman Paul, Harvey Helm, Keith Fowler, William Burns	October 22, 1956
Harry von Zell pretends to have a sprained wrist, so he doesn't have to do a fight scene on the next show. He tells George that he hired the Henderson Brothers (Gil Perkins and Sol Gorss) as stunt men to fill in for him. The Burns' are interviewed by TV Guide reporter Dan Jenkins (John Hoyt) who hopes to talk to the real normal Burns', not their zany TV personas. Jenkins soon learns that he won't get a normal interview from Gracie. Meanwhile, Ronnie joins the school cheer leading squad. George does a monologue about Ronnie being a cheer leader and the hard time George had at school. Blanche tells Gracie that Mrs. Sohmers (Doris Packer) is in town. While Jenkins tries to interview George, Ronnie, Linda (Yvonne Lime) and Judi (Judi Meredith) practice a cheer. Jenkins leaves in a hurry. Mrs. Sohmers hopes to meet her matinée idol Francis X. Bushman. They ask Gracie if she could arrange it. Jenkins comes back and tries to get a serious interview with George. The Henderson Brothers come by to show George what they can do. Their stunt men routine causes Jerkins to leave. George actually gets Mr. Bushman to meet Mrs. Sohmers. Jenkins returns with his editor Mr. Penant (Raymond Greenleaf), because Mr. Pendant doesn't believe things are that crazy at the Burns house. While there, Mr. Pendant witnesses Gracie try and pass von Zell off as Mr. Bushman and Ronnie practicing with his cheerleader squad. Note: This episode's vaudeville Afterpiece is titled "Halloween."
217	5	"Ronnie's Initiation"	Rod Amateau	Norman Paul, Harvey Helm, Keith Fowler, William Burns	October 29, 1956
Mrs. Sohmers has decided to move to California and is going house hunting in Pasadena because she doesn't want to live near Gracie. As part of his college fraternity initiation, Ronnie must say and do the opposite of what people would normally expect. Gracie plays along with the boys. George does a monologue about fraternities and the Friars Club. Because Blanche isn't home, Real Estate Agent Mr. Armstrong (Herbert Rudley) speaks with Gracie and she believes that the Morton's are moving to Pasadena. Gracie decides she will have to move to Pasadena as well and asks Mr. Armstrong to put her house up for sale. She tells this to Mrs. Sohmers and not wanting to move where Gracie will be, Mrs. Sohmers asks to buy the Burns house. After speaking to Blanche, Mrs. Sohmers tells Gracie about the misunderstandings with who's moving. Now wanting to be friends, Mrs. Sohmers tells Gracie that she's going to move into her neighborhood. Ronnie and Gracie's initiation banter makes Mrs. Sohmers decide on Pasadena again. Not knowing that the initiation is over, Harry von Zell tells George to offer Gracie and Ronnie the expensive gifts they wanted, knowing they will have to turn them down. Gracie and Ronnie except and George fires von Zell. Robert Ellis appears as Ralph Grainger. Note: This episode's vaudeville Afterpiece is titled "Gracie Goes to Western Union."
218	6	"Ronnie's Bashful"	Rod Amateau	Norman Paul, Harvey Helm, Keith Fowler, William Burns	November 5, 1956
Harry Von Zell makes plans to treat the Burns and Mortons to a night on the town. He wants them to meet his new friend Vivian Abbott (Mary Lawrence). Vivian is younger than Harry and somehow she was led to believe Harry is only 32. George does a monologue about von Zell lying about his age and everyone trying to be younger than they are. Harry Morton is excited to show George a new stamp he got for his collection. And Blanche tries to hide the new dress she bought. Meanwhile, Gracie learns Ronnie's skipping a school dance and jumps to the conclusion that her son is bashful. Morton tells George that he was bashful when he was younger. Gracie tries to set up a date for Ronnie and show him how romantic her and George are. Harry and Vivian show up at the Burns' house. Harry has to go to the Morton house and leaves Vivian at the door by herself. Gracie thinks Vivian is a date for Ronnie and a confusing conversation ensuses. Three more girls from the fraternity show up, but it turns out Ronnie already had a date. Gracie takes Harry's tickets for a show and takes all the ladies out. Lisa Gaye as Carol Rogers. Note: This episode's vaudeville Afterpiece is titled "Uncle Ben at County Fair."
219	7	"The Missing Stamp"	Rod Amateau	Norman Paul, Harvey Helm, Keith Fowler, William Burns	November 12, 1956
Gracie is writing a letter to her sister Hazel. While writing it, she has a confusing conversation with Ronnie. Harry Morton tells Blanche he wants his no-good brother-in-law Roger (King Donovan) out of the house. Gracie goes to the Morton's to borrow a stamp. Not knowing it's worth, Gracie takes Harry's hundred-dollar Madagascar Imperial stamp from his cherished collection. Roger tries subtly to borrow money from Gracie, but his method backfires on him. George does a monologue about Roger the moocher. Harry Morton tells George that he suspects Roger took the missing stamp. Gracie gives George the letter to mail and he sees the stamp on it. George doesn't say anything about the stamp to the others and puts the letter in his desk drawer. Harry von Zell and Ronnie find out that Gracie took Morton's stamp and put it on a letter. They try and think of a way to get money from George to buy another one. While looking for some stamps that Ronnie said he got, Gracie finds her letter in George's desk. Gracie then gives it to Roger to mail and he sees the stamp. Thinking that he still has the letter, George says that everyone should chip in money to give as a reward to the one who returns the stamp. Roger returns the letter and takes the reward. Note: This episode's Vaudeville Afterpiece is titled "Uncle Fred's Winter Resort." This is the first episode where George uses his TV to spy on the other characters. This would become a running gag and plot device for the rest of the series.
220	8	"George's Gray Suit"	Rod Amateau	Norman Paul, Harvey Helm, Keith Fowler, William Burns	November 19, 1956
While talking about Roger, it comes out that 4 different people gave him money to get back to Seattle. Gracie attempts to ship George's new gray suit to Roger and has Harry von Zell take the package to the post office. George does a monologue about Gracie sending the suit to Roger and how there isn't any of George's clothes that he would part with. With his TV to help, George intercepts the package at the post office. In an attempt to cover up what she did, Gracie claims the suit and three of her dresses were stolen. Blanche, knowing Gracie's plot, tells Harry about the burglary. Harry Morton calls Sgt. Webber (Hugh Sanders) of the police and requests an extra patrol to prevent any robberies at his house. Harry von Zell and Ronnie play along with Gracie's story, but George is on to them. George catches von Zell placing a ladder against the house to make it look like that's what the crook used. George then forces von Zell to wash his windows. Sgt. Webber comes by the Burns house and has a confusing conversation with Gracie. George comes in wearing the gray suit. Policeman Jim (Robert Foulk) comes in with von Zell, thinking he could be the crook. Jody McCrea appears as Dave. Note: This episode's Vaudeville Afterpiece is titled "Scoop Allen, Newspaperman."
221	9	"Von Zell Raises"	Rod Amateau	Norman Paul, Harvey Helm, Keith Fowler, William Burns	November 26, 1956
Ronnie asks George to chaperone his ski trip, but George says no. Meanwhile, Harry von Zell asks George for a raise and gets turned down. Gracie tells Harry that he should marry Vivian Abbott so they can accompany Ronnie and his friends. Harry doesn't want to get married and says he won't see her again as she is going to New York to take a job. After Gracie tells George that Harry needs the raise to get married, George gives him the raise. George does a monologue about Harry needing the money because Vivian will want to buy a lot of things and there are more important things than money in a marriage. Harry Morton thinks it's funny that George got duped into giving von Zell the raise. George finds out that Vivian is leaving so he pranks Harry by telling him that because of the raise she is now staying to marry Harry. Gracie starts planning the wedding. George tells Gracie that von Zell isn't getting married. Gracie says she's planning the wedding for Ronnie. Frances Johnson comes by to talk to Ronnie about the ski trip. Gracie tells George that Frances is who Ronnie's marrying. Frances runs out of the house. Harry figures if he gets fired, Vivian won't want to marry him. He goes to insult George, but George gives him a bigger raise and then another bigger raise. In the end, there is no wedding and George lets Harry keep the raises. Note: This episode's Vaudeville Afterpiece is titled "Daniel Allen, Trailblazer and Pathfinder."
222	10	"The Refrigerator Salesman"	Rod Amateau	Norman Paul, Harvey Helm, Keith Fowler, William Burns	December 3, 1956
Ronnie lands a job as an electric-razor salesman in a department store to earn some Christmas money. George does a monologue about how glad he is Ronnie got a job and George's early jobs. Harry Morton is upset that Blanche threw away his straight razor and replaced it with an electric one. Gracie thinks Ronnie needs to make bigger commissions, so she gets him promoted to refrigerator sales. She does this by buying three refrigerators. Not knowing about Ronnie's promotion, Harry von Zell suggests to George that he buy razors for his staff as Christmas presents. George calls the store and unknowingly orders seven refrigerators to be delivered to his staff. George finds a new refrigerator in the house. Gracie makes up a story that the Morton's bought it as a Christmas gift for George. George calls the store again and unknowingly has a fridge sent to the Morton's. George uses his TV and finds out it was refrigerators he bought. George fires von Zell. Note: This episode's Vaudeville Afterpiece is titled "Uncle Waldo in the Foreign Legion."
223	11	"The Girl Behind the Perfume Counter"	Rod Amateau	Norman Paul, Harvey Helm, Keith Fowler, William Burns	December 10, 1956
Ronnie is in love with Madeline Craig (Susan Luckey), the girl behind the perfume counter at the store where he works. George does a monologue about people Ronnie's age falling in love and a girl George was crazy about when he was younger. Through a mix-up, Gracie believes Mrs. Craig (Adele Jergens) is Madeline. Gracie tells Blanche and Harry von Zell how old the woman looks. Harry suggests Gracie get Ronnie fired and that way he won't see the woman anymore. Blanche tells Harry Morton what a terrible father George is and Harry tells Blanche about his father advising him. Morton says he's going to speak to the perfume counter woman. Gracie's attempt to get Ronnie fired fails. She then sees Madeline, and not knowing who she is, asks if she would like to go out with Ronnie. Gracie tells Madeline that hopefully that will stop Ronnie from running around with the older woman. Madeline leaves the store and Miss Hersch (Marjorie Stapp) takes over for her. Morton shows up, starts telling Miss Hersch she should go out with older men, and he gets ticked out of the store. George turns on his TV and watches Madeline tell Ronnie that they are finished. George straightens everything out between Ronnie and Madeline. John Eldredge appears as Floorwalker Willoughby. Note: This episode's Vaudeville Afterpiece is titled "The Volunteer Fire Brigade."
224	12	"Ronnie Quits College Because His Father Goes Broke"	Rod Amateau	Norman Paul, Harvey Helm, Keith Fowler, William Burns	December 17, 1956
Prof. Robert Gordon (Frank Wilcox) tells Gracie and George that Ronnie wants to drop out of college in order to spend more time with his girlfriend Madeline. George does a monologue about how education is very important and the classes that Ronnie's taking. After speaking to Madeline, Ronnie agrees to stay in school. Not knowing this, Gracie, in her unique way, tries to inspire Ronnie to stay in college. She makes up a tall tale of George going broke, and ties it in to George's not finishing school. Nothing could be further from the truth about George's finances, but Ronnie is even more determined to quit school and find a job to help the family. Prof. Gordon calls George and tells him that Ronnie can stay in school because they have funds for needy families. George turns on his TV and finds out that the story of him being broke came from Gracie, with Harry von Zell's help. After finding this out, George helps perpetuate the rumor about his finances. Blanche calls everyone she knows with the news. After speaking with Mrs. Sohmers, Gracie really believes that George is broke. But when Gracie starts taking in boarders to raise more money, George has to tell her he's not broke. Note: This episode's Vaudeville Afterpiece is titled "The Ferryboat Pilot."
225	13	"Christmas in Jail"	Rod Amateau	Norman Paul, Harvey Helm, Keith Fowler, William Burns	December 24, 1956
Narrating from a prison cell, George recounts the strange tale of how a string of pearls that he bought as a Christmas gift for Gracie wound up landing him in jail. It starts by Gracie and Blanche planning a way to get their husbands into the jewelry store. Then they try to have their husbands coax each other into buying their wives gifts. In the store, the men realize they've been tricked but buy the gifts anyway. George does a monologue about wives tricking their husbands into buying gifts. The husbands proceed to hide the gifts, but the wives find them. Meanwhile, Ronnie needs some extra money to buy his mother's present and he tries to get it from Harry von Zell. Ronnie and von Zell come up with a scheme to get the money from George. George eventually gives the money to Ronnie, but von Zell doesn't know it. Harry then tells Gracie how Ronnie needs the money and she decides to pawn her pearls and hide some fake ones. When von Zell tries to give Ronnie the money from Gracie, he says he doesn't need it. Ronnie shows George a pearl necklace that he bought for Gracie. George doesn't tell Ronnie that he had also bought some pearls. George gets arrested when he tries to return the fake pearls. The whole gang celebrates Christmas with George in his cell. John Stephenson appears as The Jewelry Clerk. George E. Stone appears as Joe. Frank Mills appears as The Professor in Jail. Paul Birch appears as The Police Desk Sergeant. Note: This episode's Vaudeville Afterpiece is titled "Christmas Eve with the Allens." VHS release 1992.
226	14	"The Costume Party"	Rod Amateau	Norman Paul, Harvey Helm, Keith Fowler, William Burns	December 31, 1956
George, Morton and von Zell need a loan from banker Chester Vanderlip (Grandon Rhodes) to secure a business deal, so George and Gracie throw a dinner party and invite him. George tells Gracie to make sure that Blanche's shifty brother Roger is not there, as he doesn't want Roger to somehow get involved with the deal. George doesn't know but Gracie has already invited him. George does a monologue about the party that evening. Gracie asks Ronnie what she should do about Roger. Gracie and Ronnie come up with the idea that it should be a costume party, that way no one will know who's who. George goes along with the idea, as he doesn't think Roger could afford a costume. Roger gets costumes for himself and his date from Gracie. Harry Morton tells George that Roger got a costume, knows about the deal with Vanderlip and is still showing up. When Mr. Vanderlip shows up in costume, George mistakes him for Roger and throws him out. George, Morton and von Zell find out it was Chester they threw out and go out after him. The Vanderlips come in through the back way. When George, Morton and von Zell come back to the front door, Chester answers it and throws them out. Sarah Selby appears as Lucille Vanderlip. Jean Willes appears as Geraldine. Gloria Marshall appears as Roberta. Note: This episode's Vaudeville Afterpiece is titled "Relative Who Is a Cab Driver."
227	15	"Gracie and the Bullfighter"	Rod Amateau	Norman Paul, Harvey Helm, Keith Fowler, William Burns	January 7, 1957
Ronnie and Ralph (Robert Ellis) return from a visit to Tijuana, Mexico, where they became fascinated with bullfighting. Gracie gets mad at George for not taking an interest in Ronnie's hobbies. George does a monologue about trying to keep up with Ronnie's hobbies. George turns on his TV and watches Gracie complain to the Morton's about his lack of interest in what Ronnie does. Gracie tells them that her and Harry von Zell are going to Tijuana to learn about bullfighting so she can discuss it with Ronnie. He also watches as the Morton's plan to tell him that Gracie left him and went to her mother's. Knowing what they're up to, George plays along with the Mortons and in the process, gets Harry in trouble. In Tijuana, Gracie and von Zell meet José Sandoval, a retired bullfighter. They invite José to come and spend some time at the Burns house. By the time Gracie and von Zell return, Ronnie's attention is focused on modern dancing instead. José and Gracie talk George into changing into a bullfighter's suit. José and Gracie then see Ronnie dancing with his teacher, Martha and dance with them. George shows up with the suit on and Gracie tells him about Ronnie's new hobbie. Note: This episode's Vaudeville Afterpiece is titled "Cousin Nelson, Northwest Mountie."
228	16	"The Ugly Duckling"	Rod Amateau	Norman Paul, Harvey Helm, Keith Fowler, William Burns	January 14, 1957
While being tutored by brainy and plain looking friend Mildred McCoy, Ronnie and Ralph can do nothing but talk about beautiful Joyce Collins (Jackie Loughery) and the prom that evening. Joyce comes by and agrees to go to the prom with Ronnie. Because no one asked her to go, Gracie decides to give Mildred a makeover. George does a monologue about looking back at problems of the past. Meanwhile, a fight ensues when Harry Morton unintentionally insults Blanche's looks. Ronnie tells George that Joyce is now going to the prom with one of his friends named Bill because he just bought a fancy new car. George pays Ronnie to take Mildred. George conjures up a magic Genie to get the money back that he gave Ronnie, but the Genie just laughs at him. Joyce shows up because Bill stood her up and now wants to go with Ronnie. Gracie tries to make Joyce think that Ronnie is sick and can't go. A beautifully made over Mildred tells Gracie she now has a date with Bill. Ronnie winds up taking Joyce to the prom. Not wanting to spend the evening alone, George conjures up the Genie again and they watch TV. Note: This episode's Vaudeville Afterpiece is titled "Let's Talk About Your Family."
229	17	"The Aptitude Test"	Rod Amateau	Norman Paul, Harvey Helm, Keith Fowler, William Burns	January 21, 1957
The new term is starting at school and Ronnie has to decide what profession to take up. Ronnie explains the aptitude test that he has recently taken to Gracie and Blanche. He mentions how Dr. Craegmoor (Hayden Rorke) says everyone should take the test, even if they already have a job. Meanwhile, Harry von Zell tells George he is unhappy because the writers never have him get the girl in the show. Harry pays Ronnie to also tell George that Harry should get the girl. George does a monologue about people who but into things they know nothing about and giving unwanted advice. Gracie believes George is unhappy being in showbiz. Harry Morton and Blanche try to think of jobs George would be good at, but come up with nothing. Craegmoor comes by and tells Gracie that Ronnie's test shows he should be an actor. Gracie wants Craegmoor to give George an aptitude test. George turns on his TV and watches Harry von Zell ask Craegmoor to put in a good word for him to George. Harry then goes and hides in a closet. George, knowing what is going on and that von Zell is in the closet, asks Craegmoor if he would like to replace Harry on the show. Craegmoor thinks he's going to be an actor and von Zell panics. George sprays the closet with moth spray, covering von Zell. He then tells von Zell he'll get the girl on the next show. Note: This episode's Vaudeville Afterpiece is titled "Casey Allen, the Railroad Man."
230	18	"Going to Palm Springs"	Rod Amateau	Norman Paul, Harvey Helm, Keith Fowler, William Burns	January 28, 1957
Once Ronnie and Ralph hear that Joyce, Mildred and a bunch of other girls are spending a week in Palm Springs, they decide to go as well. But they need to come up with the money. Meanwhile, Harry Von Zell has lost his voice. Gracie decides that she and George and the Mortons should go with Ronnie to Palm Springs to make sure the girls don't bother him. Gracie and Blanche have to figure a way to get the husbands to want to go on the trip. Ronnie asks his father's intervention to get Gracie to butt out. Gracie tells George he doesn't look well and needs some rest, but he says they're not going to Palm Springs. George does a monologue about Gracie always worrying about Ronnie, going to Palm Springs and ways to relax. Blanche gets Harry Morton to want to go when she tells him her brother Roger is coming for a week. George talks tightwad Harry out of the trip by detailing how much a week in Palm Springs would cost him. George turns on his TV and sees Gracie telling Blanche her next plan to get George to go. Gracie has Dr. Hendricks (Harry Cheshire) look at von Zell, telling the Doctor he's George. She hopes to get a certificate that says George needs to take a trip and rest. Knowing what's going on, George dresses up as a doctor and lets everyone know George is not going to Palm Springs. Gracie suggests to George they still go to Palm Springs but not to the same resort that Ronnie's going to. George and Gracie's real-life daughter Sandra plays a waitress. Note: This episode's Vaudeville Afterpiece is titled "Cousin Philo, Private Eye."
231	19	"The Matrimonial Bureau"	Rod Amateau	Norman Paul, Harvey Helm, Keith Fowler, William Burns	February 4, 1957
Gracie learns that when Ronnie reaches age 21 in four months, he can get legally get married without first asking her permission. She decides to play matchmaker for him, whether he is interested or not. Blanche suggests that Gracie speak to George first. Meanwhile, George tells his Writer (Nesdon Booth) that the next script is no good. Gracie talks to George and to play along, George suggests Gracie go to a matrimonial agency. George does a monologue about how putting on a TV show is not as easy as it looks and he talks about his writers. George then replaces a picture of Ronnie with a picture of Harry von Zell. But, Gracie misunderstands Mr. Tucker (Roy Roberts) of the agency and brings a picture of George. Blanche and Harry Morton give George a hard time about having Gracie pick out a wife for Ronnie. Mr. Tucker at first misunderstands and tries to have Gracie meet a Mr. Campbell (Harry Antrim). Gracie explains that it's Ronnie she's trying to set up and gives him the picture. Mr. Tucker shows the picture of George to a Mrs. Crowley (Eleanor Audley). George turns on his TV and watches Mrs. Crowley looking at the picture he thinks is von Zell's. She comes by to see George, excepts his proposal and then gives him a kiss. Harry is there and tells Gracie what happened. Gracie is upset and has Tucker send over Mr. Campbell for her. George straightens everything out and sets up Mr. Campbell with Mrs. Crowley. Note: This episode's Vaudeville Afterpiece is titled "Wyatt Allen, Western Town Marshal."
232	20	"The Fortune Teller"	Rod Amateau	Norman Paul, Harvey Helm, Keith Fowler, William Burns	February 11, 1957
Ronnie tells Gracie that Ralph got a new car for passing the semester. George gives Ronnie a tie. George does a monologue about people expecting presents. Fortune teller Madam Olga (Jean Willes) reads Gracie's tea leaves. She tells Gracie that George will be coming into a lot of money. This leads Gracie to splurge on a new automobile for Ronnie. The Morton's and Harry von Zell wonder how George acquired the windfall and why he didn't tell them about it so they could get in on the deal. The three proceed to insult George. Morton and von Zell then ask Gracie how George made all the money. Ronnie thanks George for the new car and mentions about George coming into money. George turns on his TV and sees Gracie talking to Madam Olga. Gracie asks her how George made the money. While still watching them on TV, George calls Madam Olga and tells her to come to the house. While she is there, George explains to the two Harrys what actually happened, and that he didn't come into any money and he's returning Ronnie's car. Sandra Burns is heard as the telephone operator. Note: This episode's Vaudeville Afterpiece is titled "Noah Allen The Veterinarian."
233	21	"Fighting for Happiness"	Rod Amateau	Norman Paul, Harvey Helm, Keith Fowler, William Burns	February 18, 1957
Ronnie's girl friend Joyce Collin's father is in town from Oklahoma. Ronnie hopes that George can make a good impression. Ronnie tells George and Gracie how happy his newlywed friends Lou (Jody McCrea) and Edie (Marian Collier) are. Meanwhile, Harry von Zell would like a week off to play the part of a Gaucho in a dramatic TV show. George says no. Harry tries to shows George the part, but George walks away. Lou comes by and tells Ronnie that he and Edie have split up. Edie then comes by. Gracie sees Lou and Edie romantically make up after their fight. George does a monologue about envying young couples, jealousy causing problems and his wedding to Gracie. Gracie deliberately starts a fight between Blanche and Harry Morton so they can kiss and make up, which they do. However, Gracie can't seem to get a fight started with George. Mr. Collins (Robert Carson) comes by and George and him get along great. Ronnie tells George what Gracie is trying to do. George then picks a fight with Gracie, but she won't make up. Note: This episode's Vaudeville Afterpiece is titled "Doc Allen, Medicine Man."
234	22	"The Termites"	Rod Amateau	Norman Paul, Harvey Helm, Keith Fowler, William Burns	February 25, 1957
Gracie wants to hire Michael Rockford (Frank Wilcox), a high-priced decorator, to redo the bedroom. But she doesn't want George to find out until after the work is done. Gracie needs to get George out of the house for two days. Michael comes by the house and George runs into him. Gracie tries to pass him off as an explorer who will lecture at the women's club. George goes and turns on his TV in the den. He sees what Gracie is up to. George does a monologue about Gracie getting decorators, bosses installing TV's to watch their workers and how these TV's could've helped in history. First Gracie calls Harry von Zell and tells him that George will go duck hunting with him. Harry shows up at 4:30 in the morning and George fires him. Gracie and Ronnie then cook up a story that the house must be fumigated to rid it of termites. The plan then is for George to take Gracie to Palm Springs for a couple of days. While they are gone, Ronnie and Ralph hope to have a party. Ronnie and Ralph have rigged up the living room to have things move around making it look termite infested. Knowing what's going on, George plays along and gets Harry Morton to believe the Burns house is infested. George agrees to go to Palm Springs and tells Gracie to have Rockford do the decorating. He then plays a trick on Harry Morton to make Harry believe his house is infested as well, so Harry and Blanche could go along on the trip. Note: This episode's Vaudeville Afterpiece is titled "Robin Allen, Incompetent Burglar."
235	23	"The $15,000 Error"	Rod Amateau	Norman Paul, Harvey Helm, Keith Fowler, William Burns	March 4, 1957
Ronnie tells George that he has just meet Kathy Shaw (Katherine Marlowe) and he knows she is the girl he is going to marry. George does a monologue about living one's youth all over through one's son and not decorating the family apartment when George was younger. Blanche tries to convince Harry to redecorate their bedroom, but he is not interested. Michael Rockford, the Burns' decorator, tells Gracie that he has an opportunity to buy an art collection for $15,000, and asks if he can receive his payment early. Gracie misunderstands and thinks she owes him 15 grand and not the actual $800. She tries to get George to sign a check without him knowing, but that doesn't work. Gracie then asks Harry von Zell for the money, but he doesn't have it. She then tries to get a bank loan. Mr. Adams from the bank comes over to the house. Ronnie gets a call from Joyce while Kathy is there and Kathy gets mad. George makes Kathy believe that the other woman was a friend of his playing a joke. Kathy apologizes to Ronnie. George talks to Mr. Rockford and the money misunderstanding is cleared up. George then straightens things out with Mr. Adams. Sandra Burns appears as the voice of Joyce on the phone. Note: This episode's Vaudeville Afterpiece is titled "Cecil B. Allen, The Movie Director."
236	24	"The Ring"	Rod Amateau	Norman Paul, Harvey Helm, Keith Fowler, William Burns	March 11, 1957
Ronnie's girlfriend Kathy is also dating Ronnie's friend Ralph Grainger. Gracie gives her engagement ring to Ronnie, to give to Kathy, to keep her away from Ralph. Gracie then leaves Blanche to explain to George where the ring went to and Blanche tells him that it fell into the kitchen sink drain. George says he'll call a plumber to find the ring. George does a monologue about believing Blanches story, how expensive plumbers can be and getting engaged to Gracie. Ronnie tells Gracie that Kathy loved the ring. Gracie tries to tell Ronnie about love and relationships, but he winds up telling her. George is waiting for the plumber. Harry von Zell thinks he can do it, but things don't go well. Cuthbert Jantzen (Howard McNear), the plumber, shows up. Cuthbert mentions to George that he is a widower and misses having a wife. Kathy comes to the door and she shows George the engagement ring Ronnie gave her. Realizing Blanche made up the story, George finds a way to get back at her. He tells Mr. Jantzen that there is a pretty widow living next door and she is looking to get married. Mr. Jantzen mistakes Gracie for the widow. George tells Blanche that if Cuthbert doesn't find a ring, she'll have to pay for his time. George goes back to his house and tells Cuthbert he should kiss the widow. Gracie walks in and Cuthbert kisses her. After some more confusion, George makes sure Kathy keeps the ring. Note: This episode's Vaudeville Afterpiece is titled "The Cruise Hostess."
237	25	"The Plumber's Friend"	Rod Amateau	Norman Paul, Harvey Helm, Keith Fowler, William Burns	March 18, 1957
Harry Morton is in Omaha and Blanche is upset when he writes her a very uncaring letter. Ronnie finds an interesting way to get money out of George. George does a monologue about family members coming to each other for money. Gracie agrees to let plumber Cuthbert Jantzen's four daughters stay at the house while he is in San Diego. Gracie gets a long distance call from Omaha looking for Blanche and a confusing conversation ensues. Ronnie tells George that he broke up with Kathy because she is so jealous. Ronnie says that he is through with women forever and then he meets the Jantzen girls. Kathy comes by to apologize and after seeing the daughters with Ronnie, she says they are still not engaged and leaves. Ronnie goes after her. George turns on his TV and watches Harry von Zell meet the daughters. Harry figures he can weasel a dinner invitation out of George and then spend more time with the women. Knowing what Harry is going to try and pull, George fires him and tells him to leave. Gracie tells Blanche that there were several phone calls for her. Gracie mixes things up and instead of calling Omaha, Blanche calls Mary Livingstone. Gracie gets on the phone and there is more confusion. Ronnie straightens things out with Kathy and takes her and the Jantzen girls out to dinner. George then tricks von Zell into taking him, Gracie and Blanche to dinner. Sandra Burns appears as a telephone operator. Yvonne Lime appears as Joy Jantzen. Mary Ellen Kay appears as Joan Jantzen. Note: This episode's Vaudeville Afterpiece is titled "Edward R. Allen, News Analyst."
238	26	"Going to Houston"	Rod Amateau	Norman Paul, Harvey Helm, Keith Fowler, William Burns	March 25, 1957
Mr. McAfee (Ralph Dumke) has decided to take his son Brian (Robert Easton) out of college because he's been there nine years already. Blanche receives another unromantic postcard from Harry and reads it to Gracie. He also sent her his laundry. George suggests that Gracie, Blanche and Ronnie go speak to Mr. McAfee, not knowing he lives in Texas. George does a monologue about keeping one's house running smoothly, his and Gracie's marriage being a 50/50 proposition and his education. Once George realizes that they've gone to Texas, he decides to go after them. Harry von Zell wants to go along, convinced there's an oil deal in the making. Once in Houston, Ronnie wants to get to know Brian's sister, Bonnie Sue. Gracie, with Blanche posing as Professor Anderson, tries to talk Mr. McAfee into leaving Brian in school. But, it's George that gets him to say yes. Harry von Zell then realizes that there is no oil deal. S. John Launer as Mr. Clifford the Desk Clerk. Judi Meredith assumes the recurring role of Ronnie's girlfriend from Texas, Bonnie Sue McAfee. Sandra Burns is heard as the telephone operator. Note: This episode's Vaudeville Afterpiece is titled "Henry Wadsworth Allen, Poet."
239	27	"The Stray Dog"	Rod Amateau	Norman Paul, Harvey Helm, Keith Fowler, William Burns	April 1, 1957
Hotel manager Mr. Paris (Lewis Martin) tells Mr. Clifford the Desk Clerk that he lost his wife's dog, Fifi. Bonnie Sue tells Gracie that she would like to be an actress. Gracie says that she should audition for George anywhere she sees him. Blanche and Gracie believe they have found a stray puppy, but they don't know that it's Fifi. Gracie would like to keep it. Guests are not allowed to keep animals in the hotel, so she and Blanche decide to hide the dog from George and the hotel staff. Meanwhile, Harry von Zell is dressed up as a cowboy so people will think he's from Texas. George speaks to Mr. Paris and suggests he buy another dog before his wife finds out. George does a monologue about peoples pets. Gracie confuses Charles the Waiter when she tells him to take everything from the meal he brought back except the bone. George gets into the elevator that Bonnie Sue runs and she proceeds to audition for him. George finds out that Fifi is in his hotel room. Gracie hopes to smuggle the dog out of the hotel in von Zell's cowboy hat, but the dog gets away and goes back to Gracie's room. Mr. Paris brings the new dog to the lobby and von Zell, thinking it is Fifi, grabs it and brings it back to Gracie's room. Everyone winds up in the room for a loud, then quiet finish. Note: This episode's Vaudeville Afterpiece is titled "Thomas A. Allen, the Inventor."
240	28	"Ronnie Gets a Movie Role"	Rod Amateau	Norman Paul, Harvey Helm, Keith Fowler, William Burns	April 8, 1957
Ronnie has a part in the Pat Boone movie Bernardine, produced by Samuel G. Engel. Gracie fears George will be furious that their son is putting his education on the back burner. Gracie causes some confusion when she calls Blanche at 5 in the morning. George gets a call from Sam Engels (Herbert Rudley) and finds out that Ronnie's in the picture. George is very happy about it. George does a monologue about how proud he is of Ronnie and a few stories from George's childhood. Not knowing that George found out, everyone bends over backwards to cover for Ronnie. George plays along. Gracie and Harry von Zell go to speak to Sam Engels. They try to have Sam let Ronnie off early in the day so it looks to George as if he were coming home from school. George tells Ronnie he knows about the picture and is pleased. Gracie and von Zell come home and still try to cover for Ronnie. George still plays along until Ronnie tells Gracie and von Zell that George knows. Sandra Burns appears as Engel's secretary. Note: This episode's Vaudeville Afterpiece is titled "Bowling." In real life, Ronnie did play the part of Griner in the film. Airing three months prior to the movie's July 24, 1957 release, this episode publicized the movie by not only repeatedly mentioning the director, but also by Ronnie explaining the movie's plot and naming each of its lead cast members..
241	29	"The Plumber's Union"	Rod Amateau	Norman Paul, Harvey Helm, Keith Fowler, William Burns	April 15, 1957
When a letter for plumber Cuthbert Jantzen arrives at George's house, he asks Gracie why. Gracie arranged to find a wife for Cuthbert via an ad in the "Personals" column and used their address. But she was less than truthful in her description of him. Gracie calls Cuthbert and he says he'll come by to get the letter. Meanwhile, Ronnie approaches George for acting advice. George tries to help Ronnie, but Ronnie keeps interrupting him. George does a monologue about giving and getting advice. Cuthbert comes by and reads the letter. A Julie Aames (Lois Collier) writes that she will meet with Cuthbert. So now Gracie asks Harry von Zell to get George out of the house for awhile, but he doesn't have any luck. George turns on his TV and finds out what Gracie is up to. Gracie now has Blanche try to get George to leave, and he pokes a hole in her story. Cuthbert brings his daughters over and they go upstairs with Ronnie. A young Julie arrives and sees how old Cuthbert is. The daughters dress up as little girls and call Julie "mom". George dresses up as a little boy and Julie leaves. Note: This episode's Vaudeville Afterpiece is titled "Wilbur Orville Allen, Barnstormer."
242	30	"Harry Returns Early"	Rod Amateau	Norman Paul, Harvey Helm, Keith Fowler, William Burns	April 22, 1957
Gracie and Blanche agree that their husbands aren't always romantic. They also agree that they don't always do things to encourage them. Gracie decides to give George a candlelight breakfast. Gracie keeps trying to get romantic and George keeps asking about food. Instead of crepes suzette, Gracie gives George flaming oatmeal. George does a monologue about not being young anymore, he doesn't mind being older and being a great lover when he was young. Harry Morton returns from his business trip a day early. George convinces him to don a beard, sport a French accent and romance Blanche as somebody else. George double crosses Harry and tells Blanche what's going on and she then plays along with the gag. Gracie catches them and concludes Blanche is having an affair. Gracie wants Harry von Zell to put on a beard and throw the Frenchman out, but he runs away. But he does give Gracie an idea. von Zell tells George what Gracie wanted him to do and George tells him to do it. Meanwhile, Gracie goes to a gym and gets Foley the strong man (Steve Reeves) to agree to remove the bearded man from Blanches house. Foley mistakenly throws Harry von Zell out of the house. Gracie tries to cover up for Blanche and says the Frenchman was her lover. George straightens things out. Note: This episode's Vaudeville Afterpiece is titled "Deep-Sea Doodle Allen, Diver."
243	31	"The Publicity Romance"	Rod Amateau	Norman Paul, Harvey Helm, Keith Fowler, William Burns	April 29, 1957
The publicity department of the studio sends Ronnie on several dates with a new Italian actress named Maria Tornini (Lita Milan). This causes problems with his real-life girlfriend Kathy Shaw as he has to keep breaking dates with her. George does a monologue about publicity stunts studios come up with and they don't always work. Ralph comes to see Ronnie and mentions how he'd like to meet Maria. Kathy then stops by and says that if Ronnie can go out with Maria, she can go out with other guys. She kisses and leaves with Ralph, but once outside, she slaps him and leaves. Ronnie tells his parents what happened and after he leaves, George tells Gracie to stay out of it. After Gracie leaves, George turns on his TV to see what she'll do. Gracie and Blanche ask Harry von Zell to go to the studio, pretend to be Maria's father and tell them he doesn't want her to go out with Ronnie. But von Zell doesn't think he could pull it off. Blanche tries to talk her husband into doing it as he speaks Italian, but Harry refuses. Gracie and von Zell go to see Jim Denton (Francis DeSales) who is in charge of publicity. However, Denton doesn't fall for their ploy. Maria brings her boyfriend Pietro with when she comes to speak with George. She says Pietro doesn't understand that her dates with Ronnie are purely for publicity. George gets Ronnie and Kathy into the room. George comes up with a plan to make everyone happy. Gracie repeats the plan thinking she came up with it and George fires von Zell. Note: This episode's Vaudeville Afterpiece is titled "Atlas Allen, Strong Man."
244	32	"The Texan Lady Macbeth"	Rod Amateau	Norman Paul, Harvey Helm, Keith Fowler, William Burns	May 6, 1957
Gracie is going out to lunch with Ronnie, so George asks Blanche if she'll go out and have lunch with him. George does a monologue about Harry Morton's diet, people eating health food and not having much food as a child. Ronnie is back in college after his brief stint at movie acting. Ronnie complains to Gracie that all his friends rib him about his movie career. Aspiring Texas actress Bonnie Sue McAfee arrives in Beverly Hills. Her brother Brian begs Gracie to find a way to get her to return home to Texas. Gracie tells Bonnie Sue to give up show business, so she won't be as unhappy as Gracie is. Gracie tries to convince Bonnie Sue and Harry von Zell that George beats her because she gets all the laughs. Harry goes off to confront George. He tells George that he won't work for a wife beater and he's quitting. George says that's too bad because he was going to give von Zell a big raise. Harry asks how big of a raise and George tells him to leave. Meanwhile, Gracie is trying to convince Bonnie Sue that Hollywood has changed Ronnie. Gracie sends Bonnie Sue to the Morton house to see how happy they are because they're not in show business. When Bonnie Sue gets there, the Mortons are fighting. Bonnie Sue auditions for George and he finds a way to have her agree to go back to Texas. Sandra Burns plays the waitress. Note: This episode's Vaudeville Afterpiece is titled "Clyde 'Bring Em Back Alive' Allen, Animal Tamer."
245	33	"Ronnie's Boat"	Rod Amateau	Norman Paul, Harvey Helm, Keith Fowler, William Burns	May 13, 1957
With the money he made from the movie he was in, Ronnie puts a down payment on a 22-foot cabin cruiser. But, because he's not 21, he needs his father's credit for the balance. Mr. Strickland (Forrest Lewis), credit man from the boat store, calls George and George says he'd be happy to sign the agreement. George does a monologue about Ronnie always loving boats, George's experience with a boat when he was a boy and a friend of George's who built miniature boats. Thinking George will be against it, Gracie enlists her friends to think of a plan to convince him that the boat is a wise investment. Gracie tries to make George think that Ronnie needs a boat for his health. Meanwhile, Frank MacDougal (Ralph Clanton) from the BBC comes to town to renew the contract for the show. He calls George and says he'll be coming by for a signature. Gracie has another meeting with her friends and now they want Harry Morton to talk to George. George tells Harry that he's all for Ronnie getting the boat. When Mr. MacDougal arrives, Gracie thinks he's from the boat store and hides him in the closet. Mr. Strickland then arrives and George lets everyone know he's signing for the boat. George lets Mr. MacDougal out of the closet. Hugh Sanders appears as Mr. Kendall, boat salesman. Note: This episode's Vaudeville Afterpiece is titled "Boulder Allen, Construction Engineer."
246	34	"A Trip to Tahiti"	Rod Amateau	Norman Paul, Harvey Helm, Keith Fowler, William Burns	May 20, 1957
Gracie has everything all set for Ronnie and his friend Ralph to sail to Tahiti on Ronnie's cabin cruiser. Ronnie hasn't told George about the trip and wants Gracie to do it after the boys have left. Blanche thinks George should know about it now, but Gracie lies and says he knows. George is watching all of this on his TV. George does a monologue about the various reasons for not wanting Ronnie to make the trip, George not enjoying sailing and young and old people loving to dream. Joy Jantzen and her sister June come by the Burns house. The girls would like to spend time with the boys on the boat locally. The boys realize what they'll be missing out on if they go to Tahiti. Ronnie tells Gracie that he doesn't want her to worry about him, so he's not going on the trip. Gracie still wants the boys to go because she thinks Ronnie will bring her back a Vicuña coat. George is watching this on his TV. Ronnie wants George to think up an excuse for them to cancel the Tahiti trip. George tells Gracie that Ronnie can't go because he doesn't have a captain's license. Gracie brings Harry von Zell to the Coast Guard Station. Gracie tells the Coast Guard Officer (John Gallaudet) that Harry is an old Norwegian sea captain. Harry would like to get a license, but the Officer sees through Harry's scheme and turns him down. Now that Ronnie's not going to Tahiti, Gracie buys herself a Vicuña coat. Blanche comes up with a plan to get the money for the coat from George. George is watching this on his TV. Before Blanche can do anything, George tells Gracie he's happy she got the coat. Note: This episode's Vaudeville Afterpiece is titled "The Process Server."
247	35	"The Home Graduation"	Rod Amateau	Norman Paul, Harvey Helm, Keith Fowler, William Burns	May 27, 1957
Brian McAfee's father and sister are in town for his graduation from college. Ronnie wants to take out Bonnie Sue McAfee, but he needs to get some money from George. Gracie suggests that Ronnie give George a present first. George knows what Ronnie's up to, but gives him the money anyway. Brian and Bonnie Sue come by and Ronnie takes Bonnie Sue to lunch. Brian mistakenly thinks he hasn't earned a diploma. He turns to Gracie for advice. She says that she'll help and to not tell George. But George is watching all this on his TV. George does a monologue about sons trying to fool their fathers and George spending several years in the sixth grade. Gracie goes to speak with Prof. Clinton (Frank Wilcox), but he says that if a student didn't pass the exam, there is nothing he can do. It's not until Gracie leaves that Prof. Clinton realizes who she was talking about and he knows Brian graduated. Prof. Clinton asks George to let Brian know the good news. George checks his TV again and sees the Morton's fighting. Then Gracie arrives at the Morton's. After hearing from Harry Morton how he graduated, Gracie convinces Brian to fake a broken leg so they can hold a phony ceremony in her home. Harry von Zell unknowingly gets involved in Gracie's scheme. In front of Brian's family, she has Harry Morton pretend to be the Dean and present Brian with the diploma. But her plan goes awry when George shows up with Prof. Clinton and a real diploma. Jack Benny makes a cameo appearance on George's TV. Note: This episode's Vaudeville Afterpiece is titled "Chesty Allen, The Lifeguard."
248	36	"Blanche's Mother Arrives"	Rod Amateau	Norman Paul, Harvey Helm, Keith Fowler, William Burns	June 3, 1957
Ronnie has a lunch date with French foreign exchange student Marie Bordeau (Jacqueline Beer). Ronnie is short on cash and Gracie finds a way to get it from George. Meanwhile, Blanche invites her mother to visit for a week as Harry will be out of town. But, Harry's business trip is canceled at the last minute. George gives Ronnie a French phrase to use on Marie and George tells him it means "How about a little kiss?". George does a monologue about the phrase he gave Ronnie actually meaning "Isn't it a nice day?", ways to learn to speak French and George and Gracie going to Paris and the rest of Europe. Blanche asks Gracie to pick up her mother from the airport. George watches Ronnie and Marie on his TV. Ronnie asks Marie the question and she kisses him anyway. Gracie will have Blanche's mother, Natalie Baker, stay at the Burns' house. Blanche doesn't want George to know Natalie is staying at his house, so Gracie tries to pass off Natalie as Marie. George knows what Marie looks like, but he plays along. Harry von Zell hopes to meet Marie, but George introduces him to Natalie, saying she is Marie. Ronnie comes home with Marie and George and von Zell meet her. Blanche forces Harry to ask Natalie to stay with them. Natalie has taken a liking to von Zell and George arranges for von Zell to take her out to dinner. Note: Benaderet in dual roles of both Blanche Morton and as her mother Natalie Baker. Note: This episode's Vaudeville Afterpiece is titled "Cousin Oscar, The Camp Counselor."
249	37	"A Marital Mix-Up"	Rod Amateau	Norman Paul, Harvey Helm, Keith Fowler, William Burns	June 10, 1957
While having lunch with the Jantzen girls, Ronnie believes he is an expert on women and tells the girls so. Gracie embarrasses Ronnie by telling the girls a story from Ronnie's youth. Cuthbert Jantzen comes by and once again mentions how he would like to get married. Gracie says she'll try and help. Harry von Zell speaks with George and George manages to get von Zell all flustered. George does a monologue about von Zell being important to the show and he works cheap, how von Zell flatters George whenever his contract is to be renewed and people having contract problems. Gracie meets Ruth Emerson (Jean Willes) from the advertising agency that the Jantzen girls are modeling for. She tells Ruth to come by the house because she has a man she wants Ruth to meet. Gracie tells George that she had Ruth come over to look Cuthbert over before meeting him. George wants to make things interesting so he sets it up so Ruth meets Harry von Zell instead of Cuthbert. Ruth recognizes von Zell and thinks he's the man Gracie wanted her to meet. Harry misunderstands what Ruth is talking about and thinks he's being offered a job. But Ruth believes they are talking about marriage. Gracie wants to have the wedding rehearsal that evening thinking Ruth met Cuthbert. Confusion ensues when everyone shows up that evening, each expecting something else. Robert Cummings makes an appearance as his Love That Bob television series character Bob Collins. Note: This episode's Vaudeville Afterpiece is titled "The Mountain Climber."
250	38	"The Wading Pool at Acapulco"	Rod Amateau	Norman Paul, Harvey Helm, Keith Fowler, William Burns	June 17, 1957
Ronnie and his friend Ralph Grainger apply for jobs as lifeguards at an Acapulco resort. They practice lifeguard maneuvers by rescuing Harry von Zell from the family pool, after Gracie tricks von Zell into falling backwards into the pool. Gracie tells George about Ronnie's possible job and she would like to go to Acapulco as well. Gracie goes to tell Blanche. George does a monologue about how Harry won't take Blanche to Acapulco, Harry's fishing cabin and his knowledge of fish and George would rather stay home than go to a resort. Harry tells Blanche they're not going to Acapulco. Blanche tells Harry that the alternative is having her brother Roger spend the summer with them. Harry agrees to go. George tells Harry that he doesn't want to go. Harry von Zell gives George and Harry a suggestion on how to get out of going. Ronnie and Ralph find out the lifeguard jobs they applied for are in the children's wadding pool and they now want out. Mr. Velasco is to come by and test their lifeguard skills, so the boys decide to leave. George and Morton follow von Zell's plan to get out of going to Acapulco and it works. But something von Zell says causes the trip to be back on. Barbara Darrow as Peggy. Rodolfo Hoyos Jr. as Gomez. Note: This episode's Vaudeville Afterpiece is titled "Z. F. Allen, The One-Man Post Office."
251	39	"A Pain in the Back"	Rod Amateau	Norman Paul, Harvey Helm, Keith Fowler, William Burns	June 24, 1957
Ronnie and Ralph prepare for a calypso-themed party. The boys have a confusing conversation with Gracie when they try to explain calypso music to her. George and Ronnie play bongos while George sings a made up calypso song. Blanche asks George if he'd like to play bridge with Harry and two of his CPA friends, but George says no. In an effort for the two to become better friends, Blanche wants Harry to take George on a fishing trip. Harry at first doesn't want to ask George, but Blanche finds a way to make him do it. Neither men want to go on the trip together so they mutually agree that George should fake a backache. George does a monologue about telling little white lies. Harry von Zell calls Tony Montenaro the Trainer to work on George's back. That evening, Ronnie, Ralph and Kathy are about to leave for the calpso party. Gracie tells Ronnie about George's bad back and Ronnie says that maybe he shouldn't leave. The three check on George and see there's nothing wrong with him. Tony shows up and Gracie tries to tell George that Tony's a tailor who's here to measure George for a suit. George tells Gracie to go get the Morton's. After she leaves, George tells Tony that there's really nothing wrong with his back. Thinking George is just afraid, Harry von Zell agrees to get a workout first to show George there's nothing to it. Harry can barely move after the workout. Note: This episode's Vaudeville Afterpiece is titled "The Allen Annual Picnic."
252	40	"Ronnie's Twenty-One"	Rod Amateau	Norman Paul, Harvey Helm, Keith Fowler, William Burns	July 1, 1957
Ronnie had his 21st birthday party the night before. Gracie continually talks about how Ronnie is now a man. Ronnie mentions to Gracie that he's taking Marie Bordeau to Ralph's parents place in Malibu for the weekend. George does a monologue about his birthdays and Ronnie being 21 and George now supporting a man. Harry von Zell comes by and Blanche and Gracie tease him about the woman he brought to the party and her age. George tricks Harry into washing his car. Marie comes by and tells Ronnie she will have to return to France soon as her student visa has expired. Marie proposes marriage to Ronnie so she can stay in the country. Ronnie panics and borrows some money from George so he can get out of town. Ronnie tells Gracie that he wishes he wasn't 21 anymore. Gracie and Blanche see Mr. Syms (Benny Baker) at the Bureau of Records. Gracie wants to get Ronnie's birth certificate changed and has a confusing conversation with Mr. Syms. To get Gracie to leave, Mr. Syms changes the certificate to say Ronnie is only 14 years old. George now gets von Zell to mow his lawn. Marie comes by to tell Ronnie she was only joking about getting married. Marie and Ronnie are about to leave for Malibu. Gracie says she'll have to go with as a chaperone because Ronnie is only 14. Note: This episode's Vaudeville Afterpiece is titled "Cousin Jeeves The Butler."

=== Season 8 (1957–58) ===
No. overall	No. in season	Title	Directed by	Written by	Original release date
253	1	"The General"	Rod Amateau	Norman Paul, Harvey Helm, Keith Fowler, William Burns	September 30, 1957
Gracie and Blanche have just returned from Bill Masterson's (Mason Alan Dinehart) wedding to Kay Adams. Ronnie comes to the house with the newlyweds. Bill mentions that his father, Brig. Gen. Masterson (Douglass Dumbrille) will be arriving soon. Bill tells Gracie and Blanche that his father expects him to attend the West Point academy. The problem is that West Point only accepts unmarried men. George is watching on his TV as Bill says he doesn't know what to tell his father. George, dressed in cowboy clothes, does a monologue about how westerns are taking over TV and comedy is out and other past trends in TV shows. George continues to watch his TV and sees the General arriving and talking to Gracie. He tells Gracie that he doesn't want Bill getting married and nothing will interfere with Bill going to West Point. Gracie tries to create a diversion by telling the General that Ronnie and Kay are the ones married. Gracie tells George that Bill is supposed to take his physical for West Point soon. George suggests that Gracie find someone that won't pass to take Bill's place. Harry von Zell shows up in a cowboy outfit. Gracie tries to pass von Zell off as Bill, but the Doctor (William Bakewell) knows better. George tells the General the truth. At first the General is angry, but after George speaks with him more, he is delighted with the news. Meanwhile, with the rise of television westerns, George and Harry Von Zell shamelessly jump aboard the western bandwagon throughout the whole show. Note: This episode's Vaudeville Afterpiece is titled "Hickock Allen, Pony Express Rider."
254	2	"Too Much Pot Roast"	Rod Amateau	Norman Paul, Harvey Helm, Keith Fowler, William Burns	October 7, 1957
Ronnie is girl-crazy at school, ignoring his studies. Prof. Maynard Henderson (Lewis Martin) tells George that he will have to drop Ronnie from his class unless he does better. Ronnie walks right passed the Professor and doesn't recognize him. George does a monologue about Ronnie thinking about girls, Ronnie's first date, George not looking at girls when he was very young and Ronnie's passing phases. Gracie goes to the Mortons looking for help with Ronnie and says she'll come back soon. Harry tells Blanche how he stopped a woman from pursuing him in college. Gracie comes back and Harry mentions to Blanche that he is tired of being served pot roast all the time. This gives Gracie an idea. She intends to hire several models to be around Ronnie all the time, hoping he will tire of looking at pretty girls. Meanwhile, Harry Von Zell is still dressed as a cowboy and wants to do a western skit. George tells Gracie her plan will never work. Harry Morton comes by to talk to Ronnie, but the girls that Gracie hired are distracting Ronnie. Ronnie promises to study harder now that he has the girls phone numbers. Raymond Bailey appears as Mr. Hartman. Marianne Gaba appears as Miss Illinois. Note: This episode's Vaudeville Afterpiece is titled "Balzac Allen, the Novelist."
255	3	"The Texan Italian"	Rod Amateau	Norman Paul, Harvey Helm, Keith Fowler, William Burns	October 15, 1956
Bonnie Sue McAfee (Judi Meredith) tells Gracie that she is having no luck finding an acting job. She may have to move back to Texas, which Ronnie doesn't want. Blanche mentions how Italian actresses such as Gina Lollobrigida are all the rage right now. Gracie decides to remake Bonnie Sue into Italian actress Tina Cacciatore. Meanwhile, George talks to director Art Roberts (Booth Colman) about getting Bonnie Sue a job. Art says he has a part for a girl with a Texas accent and would like to come by and meet Bonnie Sue. Gracie, Blanche and Bonnie Sue come back from the beauty shop and Bonnie Sue has a new look. Gracie introduces Tina Cacciatore to George. George does a monologue about foreign movie stars, Sophia Loren and America becoming more foreign. Harry Morton is upset that Blanche is neglecting her wifely duties by spending so much time with Gracie. While going to see George, Harry is introduced to Tina by Gracie. George is watching this on his TV. Harry complains to George about what the women are doing to Bonnie Sue. Mr. McAfee (Ralph Dumke) arrives at the Burns house from Texas. He doesn't like the idea of Bonnie Sue pretending to be Italian. Harry von Zell is still dressing as a cowboy and wants to do a Western. He tries to do some trick shooting for George and shoots out Harry Morton's window. Morton thinks it was George that fired the gun and then shoots out one of George's windows. Mr. McAfee does some trick shooting and when Gracie tries, she shoots out another one of Morton's windows. Art meets Bonnie Sue and her Texas accent comes through. Being just what Art wants, Bonnie Sue gets the job. Note: This episode's Vaudeville Afterpiece is titled "Rush Allen, The Bus Driver."
256	4	"An English Tea"	Rod Amateau	Norman Paul, Harvey Helm, Keith Fowler, William Burns	October 21, 1957
George and Gracie meet Ronnie's current girlfriend Pamela Crawford, who is British. While Gracie shows Pamela the rest of the house, Ronnie tells George how he met Pamela. George tells Gracie that Ronnie invited Pamela's mother over for tea and Ronnie would like his parents to make a good impression. George does a monologue about Ronnie's girlfriends, keeping mementos from previous relationships, and old love letters causing problems for a married man. Gracie tells Blanche and Harry that she's worried George won't impress Lady Crawford (Isobel Elsom). Harry agrees to come by and speak to Lady Crawford about more cultured things. Meanwhile, Harry von Zell makes another attempt to sell George on the idea of doing a western skit by bringing over Chief Crazy Moose. Crazy Moose and von Zell want to show George a fight scene, but George isn't interested. Gracie rents some rare painting replicas to hang on the wall from Mr. Clark (Joe Flynn). Lady Crawford arrives and Gracie tries to pass off the people in the paintings as her relatives. George is up in his den and Harry Morton arrives to the house. Morton is surprised when Gracie tries to pass him off as her husband. George is watching the conversation on his TV. George brings over Blanche and pretends to be Morton. When Ronnie and Pamela show up, George tries to clear up the deception, but von Zell and Crazy Moose only add to the confusion. Note: This episode's Vaudeville Afterpiece is titled "Noah Allen, The Zookeeper."
257	5	"September and May"	Rod Amateau	Norman Paul, Harvey Helm, Keith Fowler, William Burns	October 28, 1957
June Jantzen seeks advice from Gracie and Blanche about her father Cuthbert (Howard McNear) the plumber. June believes he is dating a woman half his age, because she saw him with the woman at a restaurant. Harry Morton comes by and gives June a compliment. Gracie gives him a hard time for chasing a younger woman like all men do. Gracie tells June she'll talk to Cuthbert. George is in the kitchen and Gracie gives him a hard time. Not knowing what's going on, George decides to go to his den and watch what plays out on his TV. Gracie calls Cuthbert and tells him to come over right away. Cuthbert is with Pauline Powell (Paula Winslowe), who he is dating. She thanks him for taking her daughter Betty out to the restaurant. George sees this conversation on his TV. George does a monologue about if everyone had a TV like his, going to fortune tellers and people doing anything to get information. Ronnie tells George that his new girlfriend Lori Willis is coming by. Lori and Harry von Zell arrive at the door at the same time. Gracie thinks Lori is with von Zell and gives the two of them a hard time. They decide to go to Blanches house to find out what's going on. Cuthbert comes by and somehow the conversation turns to plumbing and Gracie agrees to have all new pipes put in. George watches on TV as Harry Morton comes by with Lori and tries to straighten things out with Gracie, but that doesn't go well. Ronnie keeps wondering where Lori is. George brings Lori up to his den to straighten things out and calls Ronnie. Ronnie wants to stay by the door to wait for Lori so he sends Gracie up to see what George wanted. Gracie finds George and Lori together. George straightens things out with Lori and everyone else but Gracie. To get even with the men for dating a younger woman, Gracie comes back with some very, very young men for her and Blanche. Note: This episode's Vaudeville Afterpiece is titled "Beauregard Allen, Mississippi River Gambler."
258	6	"The Star Maker"	Rod Amateau	Norman Paul, Harvey Helm, Keith Fowler, William Burns	November 4, 1957
Ronnie's girlfriend Bonnie Sue McAfee tells Gracie that her brother Brian (Robert Easton) will be coming by for her help. Ronnie says that Brian's been in college for almost ten years. Brian's father says that if he flunks one more test, he'll have to come back to Texas. Brian comes by the house. Gracie doesn't want George to know she's going to help Brian, so when George walks into the room, everyone talks about the weather. George leaves to go up to his den. Brian mentions to Gracie that he wishes he were as smart as fellow student Alfred Kramer (Hooper Dunbar). Gracie wants Alfred to swap identities with Brian, so she calls him up and asks him over. He could take the test for Brian. George is watching this on his TV. George does a monologue about the pressures of taking a test. George calls Blanche and tells her not to get involved in Gracie's plan. Blanche goes to see Gracie and asks what she can do to help. Blanche mentions several reasons someone would change their name and it gives Gracie an idea. Gracie then tries to convince the near-sighted Alfred he could be a handsome movie star if he took off his glasses. Alfred can't see without his glasses. She then suggests Alfred change his name to Brian McAfee. Gracie gets Bonnie Sue and Blanche to tell Alfred he's handsome. Ronnie and Bonnie Sue get Harry von Zell to pretend he's a director and go talk to Alfred. Things get confusing when Gracie thinks von Zell quit his announcing job. Brian comes by and tells Gracie he doesn't have to take the test as the professor wants to keep the class average up. Note: This episode's Vaudeville Afterpiece is titled "P.T. Allen, The Press Agent."
259	7	"The African Hunter"	Rod Amateau	Norman Paul, Harvey Helm, Keith Fowler, William Burns	November 11, 1957
Gracie and Blanche come back from a lecture by Colonel Bradley (Edward Ashley-Cooper). Gracie is totally infatuated with him and invites the big game hunter to spend the week at the house. Gracie hasn't told George about their house guest. The Colonel arrives and brings along many of his animal trophies. Meanwhile, Ronnie wants to bring over a new girl he met and hopes George and Gracie can impress her. George runs into the Colonel and then asks Gracie what's going on. George does a monologue about the trouble with guests and different types of guests. Gracie and Blanche listen to the Colonel's stories about witch doctors that are after him while George watches this all on his TV. George asks Harry Morton to dress up as a witch doctor, but he won't do it. George tricks Harry von Zell into agreeing to dress like a witch doctor in an effort to get rid of Bradley. That night, Ronnie and Eilene (Eilene Janssen) arrive to find the animal trophies and George and Harry Morton dressed in safari outfits. George tells Ronnie he's dressed that way to show the Colonel how silly he looks. Just then Gracie, Blanche and the Colonel come in and he's wearing dinner attire. Then the witch doctor comes in. George pretends to scare him off thinking it is von Zell. But von Zell arrives in plain clothes because he couldn't get a costume. Phil Arnold appears as Colonel Bradley's Assistant. Note: This episode's Vaudeville Afterpiece is titled "The Psychiatrist."
260	8	"One Little Fight"	Rod Amateau	Norman Paul, Harvey Helm, Keith Fowler, William Burns	November 18, 1957
Ralph (Robert Ellis) tells Gracie that he thinks Ronnie was trying to make time with Madeline, a girl he really likes. The two then have a falling out. Ronnie shows up and the two are still not talking to each other. George is watching all of this on his TV. George has a talk with them and gets them to be friends again. George does a monologue about the boys fighting over a pretty girl, some people enjoy quarrelling and how when he was young he would run from a fight so he wouldn't spoil his looks. Gracie doesn't know that the boys have already made up and left the house. She stages a huge fight with Blanche to show the boys how silly it is to quarrel with one's best friend. During the fake fight several of Harry Morton's prized cups are broken. George is watching this on TV. Harry von Zell witnesses the fight and tells George. George, knowing what is going on, says they need to get the girls back together. To do this, George suggests von Zell go and start a fight with Harry Morton to show the girls how silly it is for friends to fight. George tells von Zell he'll call Morton to let him know the plan, but George doesn't make the call. More of Morton's cups are broken and von Zell comes to realize that George didn't call Morton. Meanwhile, Gracie thinks that if she can get Bonnie Sue to flirt with Ralph, that will even things up and the boys will be friends again. Bonnie Sue does flirt with Ralph and Ronnie gets mad. But then they find out that it was Gracie's plan. Thinking that the boys are still fighting, Gracie and Blanche stage another fight and even more of Morton's cups are broken. Note: This episode's Vaudeville Afterpiece is titled "Death Valley Allen, The Old Prospector."
261	9	"With or Without Glasses"	Rod Amateau	Norman Paul, Harvey Helm, Keith Fowler, William Burns	November 25, 1957
Ronnie tells George how well he's doing in school and asks for a raise in his allowance. George turns him down, but Gracie finds a way for Ronnie to get the raise. Gracie convinced Ronnie's friend Alfred Kramer that he would look more handsome without glasses. Professor Henderson tells Gracie that Alfred not wearing glasses has disrupted his studies and he's failing his classes. George is watching their conversation on his TV. Ronnie overhears part of the conversation and believes that he is the one flunking school. Ronnie tells George that he is quitting college to help him with the act so that George can retire. George doesn't go for the idea. George does a monologue about how it's hard for an actor to retire and needing money after retirement Gracie, with Blanche and George's help, convinces Alfred to start wearing his glasses again. Ronnie talks to Harry Morton and Harry von Zell about him not doing as well in school as he thought he was. To keep Ronnie from being kicked out of school, Harry von Zell will pose as a rich uncle willing to donate a large sum of money to the school. Because of a phone call from George, Professor Henderson knows it's von Zell. Henderson brings in Professor Tavelman (Howard Wendell), from the Psychiatry Dept. Henderson tells Tavelman that George says that von Zell is suffering from strange hallucinations. Harry leaves when Henderson says that Ronnie is passing all his classes, but they'll still accept his donation of money. Mildred Foster, Alfred's girlfriend, comes by to speak to Gracie. Mildred is afraid that Alfred won't find her pretty now that he can see well. Alfred comes by, and not recognizing her, finds Mildred quite pretty. Note: This episode's Vaudeville Afterpiece is titled "Mozart Allen." This lengthy routine was continued the following week.
262	10	"A Box of Cigars"	Rod Amateau	Norman Paul, Harvey Helm, Keith Fowler, William Burns	December 2, 1957
Ronnie is helping to get Ralph's girlfriend Imogene Reynolds (Valerie Allen) elected Homecoming Queen. Gracie wants to use George's cigars as a campaign bribe for the male students. Gracie tricks Harry von Zell into smuggling the cigars out of the house and over to the Morton house. He believes they are shoes Gracie wants to return. George stops von Zell and says if he's mixed up with one of Gracie's schemes, he's fired. George does a monologue about Gracie getting involved in politics, George's first experience with politics and collecting campaign buttons. Meanwhile, George's TV that he uses to spy on others is broken and he calls a repairman. At Blanche's house, von Zell discovers that what he has are actually George's cigars. George knows his cigars are missing and he buys another box. Charlie the TV Repairman (Irving Bacon) comes by and is confused by what George tells him he uses the TV for. George leaves his den and then Gracie comes by. She takes the new box of cigars and Charlie is confused with her explanation. Things get even more confusing for Charlie when von Zell and George come back. George fires von Zell. Ronnie and Ralph learn that Imogene won the election. The Morton's try to get von Zell's job back, but it doesn't work. Imogene comes by to thank the boys and tells Ralph she'll be too busy to go out with him. Charlie is finished and George goes to test the TV. George watches as Charlie takes one of his cigars. George calls Charlie to let him know what he saw and startles Charlie. Note: This episode's Vaudeville Afterpiece is titled "Mozart Allen, Part II." This is a continuation of a lengthy routine which began the previous week.
263	11	"Misery Loves Company"	Rod Amateau	Norman Paul, Harvey Helm, Keith Fowler, William Burns	December 9, 1957
Ronnie tells Gracie and Blanche that ever since Imogene was elected Homecoming Queen she has no time for Ralph and he is miserable. She is even going out with Jim Monoghan, the football captain. Gracie and Blanche try to help Ralph by being miserable as well, but that doesn't work. Gracie cannot keep her nose out of the love lives of Ronnie and Ralph. She wants to get Ronnie's girlfriend Mary Rogers (Jolene Brand) involved by making a play for Jim so that Imogene will return to Ralph. George does a monologue about how getting laughs isn't easy, comedy words and how he became a straight man. Mary comes over and Ronnie overhears Gracie's plan. Mary tells Ronnie there's nothing to worry about and that Jim couldn't be her type. Gracie's plan backfires when Mary falls for handsome Jim and they share a common love for music. Gracie feels bad and tells George she won't interfere in Ronnie's love life anymore. Gracie asks George to pretend to be Mary's father and tell Jim he doesn't want Mary seeing him. Gracie and George trick Harry Morton into doing it but that plan backfires. Mary tells Gracie she found out Jim has other girls and isn't really interested in music. George is watching this all on his TV. George decides to complicate matters by having Imogene go for Ronnie and then Mary goes after Ralph. He then gets Jim to wind up with Sylvia (Barbara Darrow), a girl that Harry von Zell is interested in. Note: This episode's Vaudeville Afterpiece is titled "Quintin Allen, The Prison Warden."
264	12	"A Hole in the Carpet"	Rod Amateau	Norman Paul, Harvey Helm, Keith Fowler, William Burns	December 16, 1957
In a plot line similar to "Gracie at the Department Store" from Season 3, this one incorporates Ronnie Burns as a department store employee. George gets a call from Mr. Connors (Hugh Sanders), the claims adjuster from the Willshire department store. He tells George that Gracie had a minor accident at the store when she tripped on a hole in the carpet. When Gracie talks to Mr. Connors, there's confusion of who is financially liable. She thinks she is liable, and the department store thinks she wants to file a lawsuit against them. Gracie believes the store wants $100 from her. George won't give her the money. George does a monologue about Gracie getting things mixed up, George is well covered and when he was young people didn't take out health insurance. George is watching on his TV as Gracie asks Blanche for the money. Harry Morton says he'll be able to get the money from George. But thanks to his TV, George knows Harry's plan. Mr. Connors and Mr. Forbes (Addison Richards) from the store come over and increase their offer. Gracie now thinks they want $500 from her. Harry von Zell tries to get the money from George, but George pretends he's broke and gets money from Harry. To assuage their liability, the store keeps giving Ronnie more job promotions every hour. The store sends Dr. Bancroft (Harry Cheshire) to examine Gracie. After a confusing conversation with Gracie, Dr. Bancroft calls Mr. Connors. He tells Mr. Connors to settle for $10,000 because Gracie clearly injured her head. Mr. Forbes makes Ronnie their claims adjuster. In the end, Gracie and the store decide to call the whole thing off. Note: This episode's Vaudeville Afterpiece is titled "Florence Allen, Nurse."
265	13	"The Old Mink Coat"	Rod Amateau	Norman Paul, Harvey Helm, Keith Fowler, William Burns	December 23, 1957
Gracie and Blanche find out what their husbands are giving them for Christmas and they are not happy. George and Harry Morton had a pact not to spend a lot of money on the presents. George does a monologue about cooking, modern kitchens, Gracie's system for cooking and cars with buttons that work everything. Blanche wants a mink coat, and Gracie already owns one. Morton thinks George just bought the mink for Gracie and reneged on their pact. Because Harry is now going to buy Blanche a mink, Gracie insists George buy her a new mink. George turns on his TV and watches Harry call Ronnie. Harry asks Ronnie if he can get an employee discount at the Wilshire Department Store where he works. He tells Ronnie to buy the best mink they have and bring the coat home. George has Harry von Zell bring over his old raccoon coat and George puts it in a Wilshire Department Store box. When Ronnie comes home, George trades the raccoon coat box for the mink box. Blanche and Gracie peek into the box Ronnie brings over and they are insulted to see the raccoon coat. Morton is upset with Ronnie and tells him to take the coat back. Ronnie doesn't know it's the raccoon coat. George explains to Morton that he switched coats so they wouldn't have to get their wives real minks. When Gracie returns home and finds the real mink coat, she assumes George got it for her for Christmas. Gracie shows it to Blanche and Harry and Harry is in trouble again. Ronnie and von Zell try to return von Zell's coat to Mr. Mavis (John Stephenson) at the department store. George manages to work things out and Blanche gets her coat. Note: This episode's Vaudeville Afterpiece is titled "Audubon Allen, The Bird-Lover."
266	14	"Invitation to the Party"	Rod Amateau	Norman Paul, Harvey Helm, Keith Fowler, William Burns	December 30, 1957
Gracie and Blanche discuss what they are going to wear to a New Year's Eve party thrown by society matron Mrs. Winthrop (Eleanor Audley). Plumber Cuthbert Jantzen comes by to work on Gracie's pipes. Gracie tells George that she sent her invitation to Blanche. George does a monologue about Gracie having a system for doing things, Gracie doing things with Blanche and Gracie being good at getting people invited to things. Harry Morton believes they were invited to the party because of his family being socially prominent. Harry thinks that the only reason George was invited is because Harry is his friend. George is watching this conversation on his TV. George has some fun and asks Harry's advice on how to act at the party. Gracie is having tea with Mrs. Winthrop and finagles an actual invitation for Blanche. Blanche discovers the truth about the invites and says she's not going because she wasn't initially invited. Gracie talks her into going. Meanwhile, Ronnie would rather go to a costume party with his friends than go to the Winthrop party and has already ordered a costume. Gracie tries to tell George that Ronnie is too sick to go to the Winthrop party. George isn't buying it and still wants Ronnie to go. A delivery man gives George Ronnie's costume. George tricks Harry von Zell into thinking that the Winthrop's are having a costume party. Gracie finds out that Cuthbert will be spending New Year's evening alone, so she invites him along to the party. Harry von Zell shows up to the Burns house in a costume and realizes he has been duped. Ronnie invites von Zell to the costume party and Cuthbert will use von Zell's invitation to the Winthrop party. Note: This episode's Vaudeville Afterpiece is titled "Rodin Allen, The Sculptor."
267	15	"The Stolen Car"	Rod Amateau	Norman Paul, Harvey Helm, Keith Fowler, William Burns	January 6, 1958
Ronnie needs a good story in order to get a reporter job for the college newspaper. George does a monologue about how writing for a paper is very specialized, people only read things that interest them and what it costs to run a paper. Brian McAfee's father has given him a new car. Knowing Ronnie needs a good story, Gracie suggests that after Harry Morton goes to work, Brian park his car in Harry's garage and then she will report it stolen. Being desperate, Ronnie agrees. Meanwhile, Blanche wants to buys a new set of dinner plates, but Harry says she spends too much money as it is. Gracie says Blanche should ask for something more expensive and then Harry will settle for the dishes. George is watching this conversation on his TV. Gracie tells Blanche she'll try the same trick on George because she wants a new lamp. George comes by and Gracie says she wants to redecorate the room. Her trick backfires when George tells her to redecorate the whole house to match the lamp. After the boys park the car, Gracie calls Harry and tells him Blanche bought a new car. Harry tells Blanche she may have the dishes and some other things if she returns the car. Gracie now wants to try the car trick on George to get the new lamp. Harry von Zell wants to help Gracie, but George knows all about the plan and tells von Zell he's fired. Ronnie gives the stolen car story to the college paper. Things gets confusing when Barbara Parker (Barbara Darrow) and then Peggy come by thinking they have a news story and a date with Ronnie. A policeman comes by with Brian thinking he stole the car. George straightens things out. Note: This episode's Vaudeville Afterpiece is titled "Casanova Allen, The Lover."
268	16	"Ronnie Finds a Friend an Apartment"	Rod Amateau	Norman Paul, Harvey Helm, Keith Fowler, William Burns	January 13, 1958
Gracie has a funny way of getting some spending money from George. Ronnie comes by and Gracie tells the two of them not to fight anymore. They fought the night before because Ronnie came home late. Ronnie tells George that he was late last night because he helped his friend Frank Brody, his wife and baby find an apartment. Ronnie even writes a check for the deposit. Mr. Walden, the apartment landlord, speaks with Gracie. He asks her to have Ronnie write out a new check for the apartment as he dated the first one incorrectly. Gracie now thinks Ronnie rented the apartment because Ronnie and George had the argument. Gracie is upset with George and George doesn't get a chance to explain what's going on. George turns on his TV to watch Gracie tell Blanche that she's going over to Ronnie's apartment. George does a monologue about Gracie being confused, Ronnie may move out one day and George leaving home when he was young. Neighbor Mrs. Barlow (Kathryn Card) is watching Mrs. Brody's (Sally Fraser) baby. Gracie drops by and comes to believe Ronnie has a wife and baby. Mrs. Barlow leaves the baby with Gracie, who decides to take the baby home to meet George. Before she leaves, Gracie calls Blanche and asks her to tell George about the baby. Harry Morton decides to tell George. George was watching this conversation on his TV. Harry tries to tell George, but George makes things confusing. Gracie brings the baby home and George is about to tell her what's going on. Ronnie comes in with Annabelle Morris (Jana Lund) and Gracie thinks she is the mother. After some more confusion, George, knowing what's going on, straightens thing out. Note: This episode's Vaudeville Afterpiece is titled "Colonel Jack Allen, Soldier of Fortune."
269	17	"McAfee and the Manicurist"	Rod Amateau	Norman Paul, Harvey Helm, Keith Fowler, William Burns	January 20, 1958
Ronnie was to have a date with Bonnie Sue the night before but forgot. Bonnie Sue comes by and apparently also forgot about the date. She tells Gracie and Blanche that her father is dating a younger woman named Helen (Peggy Maley). Helen is the hotel's manicurist, and in spite of their four-decade age difference, he falls head over heels in love and wants to marry her. Bonnie Sue believes she's just a gold-digger. George is watching all of this on his TV. George does a monologue about what the right age for marriage is and what a man looks for in a wife. Gracie wants Harry von Zell to pretend to be a wealthy Texan and make a play for Helen, but he says no. George tricks Harry into doing it, and for fun, manages to have von Zell make the play for the wrong woman named Gladys. Harry finds out that he's been tricked. George speaks to Helen and finds out she does want to marry just for money. Gracie sees Helen and not knowing who she is asks if she would make a play for Mr. McAfee. Meanwhile, Bonnie Sue and Harry Morton plan to pretend they are getting married to show Mr. McAfee how the age difference is bad. Mr. McAfee tells George that he has come to realize that Helen is just a gold-digger. Bonnie Sue and Harry Morton come by and tell Mr. McAfee that they are to marry. George tells them that Mr. McAfee is not going to marry Helen. Gracie and Helen come by and Mr. McAfee leaves with Helen. Harry von Zell and Gladys come by and Harry wants George to stop Gladys from wanting to marry him. A girl (Trudi Ames) comes to the door wanting Ronnie's autograph. With her help, George gets von Zell off the hook with Gladys. Note: This episode's Vaudeville Afterpiece is titled "Amazon Allen, The Plantation Owner."
270	18	"Too Many Fathers"	Rod Amateau	Norman Paul, Harvey Helm, Keith Fowler, William Burns	January 27, 1958
Ronnie's friend Jerry Gilbert (Steve Terrell) had a date with Sandy Allison, a wealthy girl he met at school. Ronnie let the couple use the Burns swimming pool. But somehow Sandy came to believe that Jerry lives at the Burns house and wants to meet his parents. Jerry's parents live out of town. Ronnie wants George's help, but Gracie overhears and gets involved. George does a monologue about telling the truth is the best policy and telling little white lies. Jerry comes by and tells George that he couldn't tell Sandy the truth. It seems Sandy's parents arrived from out of town and she told them about this wonderful house. Gracie tells Jerry she will pretend to be his mother. Gracie asks George to be the father and he says no. George watches on his TV as Blanche asks Harry to be the father and he says no. Sandy comes by and has a confusing conversation with Gracie. Mr. and Mrs. Allison (Ned Wever and Sheila Bromley) arrive for tea. George tricks Harry von Zell into helping Gracie serve the tea and Gracie introduces him as Jerry's father. George watches on his TV as Harry Morton shows up claiming to be Mr. Gilbert. George then comes in saying he's Mr. Gilbert. George proceeds to straighten things out. Note: This episode's Vaudeville Afterpiece is titled "Trixie Allen, The Taxi Dancer."
271	19	"The Accident"	Rod Amateau	Norman Paul, Harvey Helm, Keith Fowler, William Burns	February 10, 1958
Harry Morton is furious that he's tainted his perfect driver safety record with a traffic accident and he intends on filing a lawsuit. He also is counting on Gracie, who was in the car with him, to prove he was not at fault. Gracie tells George that Harry was hit when he drove through a red light. George suggests to Gracie that she tell Harry she can't be a witness for him. George does a monologue about how slow Harry Morton drives, how there more accidents because of the new types of cars and what George does when he has an accident. After Gracie tells Harry she won't be a witness, Blanche tells Harry that he should be nice to George. George is watching this all on his TV. Blanche decides to talk to George. George convinces Blanche that Harry has said bad things about her. George watches on TV as Blanche goes home and hits Harry on the head with a rolled up paper. Janice Baldwin, the driver of the other car, comes to the Burns house and would like to speak to Gracie. She tells Ronnie that her father, Mr. Baldwin (Willis Bouchey), says that if she was at fault, he will take the car away from her. When Mr. Baldwin arrives, Gracie tricks Harry von Zell into posing as Morton and admitting the accident was his fault. George is watching this on TV. George sends Morton over to add to the confusion. Blanche comes over and to get back at Morton she tells Mr. Baldwin that von Zell is her husband. George then gets Gracie to tell Mr. Baldwin what really happened. Note: This episode's Vaudeville Afterpiece is titled "Gallup Allen, The Poll Taker."
272	20	"The Japanese Texan"	Rod Amateau	Norman Paul, Harvey Helm, Keith Fowler, William Burns	February 17, 1958
Ronnie's girlfriend Bonnie Sue McAfee, a native Texan, wants to audition for the role of a Japanese girl in an upcoming movie. She asks Gracie for help because George knows Walter Sinclair (Charles Meredith), the producer. George refuses to help, but Gracie tells Bonnie Sue that George will. Gracie invites Mr. Sinclair to a fictional 10th anniversary dinner that evening. George is watching Gracie's phone call on his TV. George does a monologue about Gracie not giving up, Bonnie Sue wrong for the part, George's start in show business and stars that he's discovered. Bonnie Sue wants to rehearse her part and Ronnie keeps kissing her. George creates confusion by telling Gracie it really is the 10th anniversary of some event. George is watching on his TV as Gracie asks Harry von Zell to find out from George what they're celebrating. Harry gets nothing from George. Walter calls George and tells him that he has hired Sato Mitsuko for the part of the Japanese girl and he will bring her to the party. Harry von Zell tells George there's a part it that picture that would be perfect for him. Harry comes back dressed as a Japanese Sumo Wrestler and plays the part he would like to do. That night, Sato shows up and Gracie thinks it's Bonnie Sue. Bonnie Sue arrives dressed as a Japanese woman. George has Walter find a way for Bonnie Sue to not want the part. Note: This episode's Vaudeville Afterpiece is titled "Uncle Roy Allen, Judge of the Old West." Given the date of this episode, it was likely influenced by the Oscar-nominated film Sayonara that had been released two months previously.
273	21	"Hypnotizing Gracie"	Rod Amateau	Norman Paul, Harvey Helm, Keith Fowler, William Burns	February 24, 1958
Gracie goes to a hotel hoping to have a clothes designer fix her dress. But she gets the room numbers confused and winds up at the room of Professor Clifford (Jack Raine), a renowned Hypnotist. After she leaves, a newspaper reporter (Robert Brubaker) that was there, asks Professor Clifford if he could turn Gracie into a genius. Clifford is sure he could do it and it would make a great news story. George, watching this on his TV, is sure it will ruin his and Gracie's careers. George does a monologue about liking Gracie the way she is, her and him are the perfect team and working with a Hypnotist when George was in Vaudeville. Meanwhile, Gracie hopes to get George to put Ronnie's girlfriend, Verna Mason, on the show. Professor Clifford comes by and tries to hypnotize Gracie. Before he can start, Gracie leaves to go to Blanche's house. Harry Morton is frustrated because he can't balance the books for an important company. Clifford comes by the Morton house to see Gracie. Clifford briefly gets Harry Morton to love everything about Blanche. Clifford still doesn't get a chance with Gracie as she leaves again. George speaks to Professor Clifford, and they get Harry von Zell to briefly bark like a dog. For publicity, George agrees to let Gracie be hypnotized and calls the reporters. Gracie becomes a genius and they get the publicity they wanted. But when George calls Professor Clifford to snap Gracie out of it, he finds that Clifford has been called to London. Note: This episode's Vaudeville Afterpiece is titled "Gracie Won't Do Jokes." Ronnie steps in to help George.
274	22	"Gracie is Brilliant"	Rod Amateau	Norman Paul, Harvey Helm, Keith Fowler, William Burns	March 3, 1958
Now that Gracie has been hypnotized into becoming the smartest woman in the world, she starts winning on a quiz show. George is quite upset and Blanche is in tears at losing her old friend. George is now relegated to taking care of the household chores. Ronnie tells George how well he's doing at school now that he gets help from Gracie. Ronnie's even tutoring some classmates. George does a monologue about trying to get Gracie back into show business, not understanding Gracie and being too old to get a different job. Professor Clifford calls from London and tells George he can get Gracie back to her old self over the phone. George goes to get Gracie. Meanwhile, Blanche comes in, picks up the phone and is hypnotized into having a mind like the old Gracie. Professor Clifford flies back from London and returns both women to their former selves. Ronnie brings over Carol Henderson to have Gracie help her in her studies. When he finds out Gracie is back to normal, he abandons his plan for a Tutoring service. Harry von Zell brings over Abdul the great, a famous Hypnotist. Gracie returns to the quiz show and the Quizmaster (John Stephenson) realizes she is the old Gracie. Wanting to sell the sponsor's product, the Quizmaster gives Gracie an incredibly easy question, which she answers incorrectly. Note: This episode's Vaudeville Afterpiece is titled "Uncle Barnum Allen, Circus Owner."
275	23	"Ronnie's Fan Club"	Rod Amateau	Norman Paul, Harvey Helm, Keith Fowler, William Burns	March 10, 1958
Thirteen year old Edie Westrope (Ahna Capri) has a crush on Ronnie and writes him many letters. She also starts the Ronnie Burns Fan Club. Gracie thinks George should get fan mail. Gracie asks Blanche to write a letter to George. Because of his TV, George knows what Blanche is doing and has an agency produce 500 fan letters for him. Barbara Westrope (Myrna Fahey) talks to George about her sister Edie's crush on Ronnie. She is concerned because it is effecting Edie's school work. Barbara hopes that Ronnie could write a letter to Edie and tell her to study more. Gracie and Ronnie mistakenly think that Barbara is Edie. Ronnie calls and makes a date with Edie, but Edie says she'll have to bring her older sister with. Ronnie talks Ralph into going along. Meanwhile, Harry von Zell tries to convince George that he has been getting fan clubs started for George. However, George knows what von Zell is up to. When Edie and Barbara show up, Ronnie is surprised to see how young Edie actually is. But he still keeps his date with her. Phil Arnold appears as The Delivery Boy. Note: This episode's Vaudeville Afterpiece is titled "Anthony Allen, The Diplomat." This episode was omitted from the syndication package which aired on Antenna TV.
276	24	"Frozen Passion"	Rod Amateau	Norman Paul, Harvey Helm, Keith Fowler, William Burns	March 17, 1958
George has a director/producer friend named Jack Bradley (Raymond Bailey) who wants George to help with his new movie. Gracie tells Jack that her friends would be perfect for the different parts in the film. Up in his den, George mentions to Jack that he has received a bad movie script called "Frozen Passion". Gracie comes in and to discourage her, Jack mentions the parts in Frozen Passion. This, however, doesn't deter Gracie and she tells everyone they will have a part. George does a monologue about the pictures that make money tell of the problems of youth, or are monster pictures. They don't make romantic pictures these days. Meanwhile, Harry Morton informs Blanche that his father is coming to visit and Blanche is not happy about it. Gracie talks Harry von Zell into stealing the script from George's den so they can rehearse their parts. Because he's watching this on his TV, George knows what's going on and catches von Zell. But Ronnie manages to get the script. Gracie hires Mr. Chapman (Charles Tannen), a special effects man. Jack comes by and Gracie and the rest audition their parts including costumes and having snow special effects in their home. Jack decides to make his picture with someone other than George. George is not happy with his friends and family for ruining the deal. Mr. Morton Sr. (Herbert Heyes) arrives and tells Harry how happy he is to be away from the snow. The two go to George's house and the special effects snow starts again. Mr. Morton Sr. runs out of the house. Note: This episode's Vaudeville Afterpiece is titled "Ferdy Allen, The Horticulturist."
277	25	"High Blood Pressure"	Rod Amateau	Norman Paul, Harvey Helm, Keith Fowler, William Burns	March 31, 1958
George is about to leave for a golf date. Harry von Zell comes to George's den with Madame Grishka (Peg Hillias), his dramatic coach. She forces George to watch Harry run through some of his routines. Then George gets delayed by Harry Morton. Gracie and Blanche are going to a baby shower. Gracie tells George he can't play golf as he has to wait for plumber Cuthbert Jantzen. George does a monologue about how every time he makes plans something happens to spoil it and how wives don't understand that their husband's interests are very important. After the baby shower, Cuthbert tells Gracie he is nervous about an upcoming life insurance medical exam. The doctors always tell him his blood pressure is too high. Gracie decides to help by passing off George as Cuthbert when Dr. Powell (Don Dillaway) arrives. George tries to leave again to play golf. Gracie tells him that Dr. Powell is coming to examine him and George wants to know why. George tells Dr. Powell he is not Cuthbert and tells the doctor where he can find the plumber. Dr. Powell tells Gracie that Cuthbert didn't pass the exam due to his hypertension. Gracie now believes George is not well and tells all her friends. Everyone is sad about the news of George's condition and George is watching all of this on his TV. George decides to take advantage of the situation, but then Cuthbert reveals that the Doctor didn't examine George. Everyone is mad at George for tricking them, except Gracie and Ronnie. George finally gets to play golf. Note: This episode's Vaudeville Afterpiece is titled "Rhinestone Lil."
278	26	"Softening the Professor"	Rod Amateau	Norman Paul, Harvey Helm, Keith Fowler, William Burns	April 7, 1958
Spring is in the air. Blanche and Gracie go over their budgets buying new spring outfits. Gracie is not worried as she says spring makes George generous and romantic. George is watching this conversation on his TV. George knows where Gracie hid the new dress and brings it to her saying he bought it for her. Ronnie and his friend Ralph ditched two days of school to spend the days at Griffith Park. Gracie says that Professor Henderson (Lewis Martin) had called wanting to speak to Ronnie. Ronnie and Ralph are now afraid they will be thrown out of class. The boys confess to George what they did and George cuts off Ronnie's allowance. George calls Henderson and finds out that he would like all his students to come to a party to meet his new bride Florence (Irene Hervey). Henderson hasn't been at the college for the last two days either. George then pulls a prank on Ronnie and Ralph and gets them to agree to study for the next two days. George does a monologue about how Ronnie and Ralph can always come up with a reason to not go to school and how Ronnie and Gracie can come up with good excuses. Meanwhile, Blanche tries to get Harry into a romantic spring mood so she can keep her new dress. George is watching his TV as Harry tells Blanche to return the dress. George gets involved and pulls a prank on Blanche. Harry von Zell tells Gracie he's in love with Mimi Conrad and he lied about his age. Gracie has a plan to help von Zell and Henderson and his wife are thrown into the mix. Gracie thinks Florence is Mimi. Henderson tells Gracie about the party for his new wife and she thinks he means 'Mimi'. Ronnie and Ralph meet Henderson and his wife. When Henderson says he won't be in class for the rest of the week, the boys decide to stop studying. Note: This episode's Vaudeville Afterpiece is titled "Mamie Allen, The Sharpshooter."
279	27	"The Publicity Marriage"	Rod Amateau	Norman Paul, Harvey Helm, Keith Fowler, William Burns	April 14, 1958
Young teenager Edie Westrope is still infatuated with Ronnie, and follows him everywhere. Edie's sister Barbara tells Gracie that she is still concerned as Edie won't do her homework and the house is filled with pictures of Ronnie. To dissuade her, Gracie places a phony newspaper announcement that Ronnie has married Bonnie Sue McAfee. Harry von Zell, after seeing the announcement, asks Gracie how they are going to stop George from seeing it. George is watching the conversation on his TV. They come up with a silly plan to make George think it is yesterday, which of course doesn't work. George does a monologue about how von Zell is always mixed up in someone else's business and puppy love. Edie, after seeing the newspaper, gives up on Ronnie and returns to her teenage boyfriend Malcolm (Steve Firstman), both of them considering themselves engaged to be married. Harry Morton, thinking the newspaper article was all for publicity, goes to tell off George. George sees this on his TV. Bonnie Sue tells George how upset she is over the article. George says that Ronnie put the article in the paper because he loves her and wants to keep other boys away from her. Bonnie Sue is now willing to give up her acting career to marry Ronnie. Ronnie and Gracie convince Bonnie Sue that she is a great actress and shouldn't give up her career to get married. Gracie lets it slip to Edie that Ronnie isn't really married and she decides that she still loves him, leaving Malcolm out in the cold again. Note: This episode's Vaudeville Afterpiece is titled "Uncle Harley, Old-Time Motorcycle Cop."
280	28	"Blanche Gets a Jury Notice"	Rod Amateau	Norman Paul, Harvey Helm, Keith Fowler, William Burns	April 21, 1958
At breakfast, Gracie explains to George why her and Blanche have to see a movie a second time. Ronnie mentions how he spends his mornings with Verna Mason and evenings with Bonnie Sue. Blanche gets a jury duty notice and if accepted, she could be on duty for several weeks. She is worried Harry will miss her. Gracie says she will definitely miss Blanche. Harry tells George about Blanches summons and he is delighted to have her out of the house. George does a monologue about how when the wives are away, husbands think they can have a great time. Blanche tells Harry that maybe she'll try and get out of jury duty. Harry calls Judge Strickland (Douglass Dumbrille) and tells him what an excellent juror Blanche will be and he must except her. Strickland feels there's something not right about that and decides to disqualify Blanche. Harry von Zell suggests to Gracie that she volunteer for the same jury duty as Blanche. But he doesn't want George to know it was his idea. Thanks to George's TV, he already knows. Meanwhile, Ronnie's friend Verna wants to get a part on George's show. But if Ronnie helps, he knows Bonnie Sue will find out. Harry von Zell suggests a plan to help Ronnie make sure Verna doesn't get the part, but he doesn't want George to know. Because of his TV, George knows and gives Verna a part. Despite her confusing answers to Judge Strickland's questions, Gracie gets accepted for jury duty. Harry Cheshire appears as Harcourt. Note: This episode's Vaudeville Afterpiece is titled "Fitzpatrick Allen, World Traveler and Lecturer."
281	29	"Gracie and the Jury"	Rod Amateau	Norman Paul, Harvey Helm, Keith Fowler, William Burns	April 28, 1958
Gracie is on the jury for a counterfeiting trial and tells George about it over breakfast. She also talks about the people on the jury. George gives Gracie $20 for a new hat. George does a monologue about counterfeiters when he was young, coming from a poor neighborhood and Gracie being on the jury. Meanwhile, Bonnie Sue is mad at Ronnie because George put Verna Mason on his show. They come up with a plan to get Bonnie Sue on the show. George is watching the conversation on his TV and gives her the part. During the trial, Gracie can't help but be disruptive and George is watching it on his TV. Despite all the evidence against him, Gracie thinks the defendant (John Harmon) is innocent. While the jury is inspecting the counterfeit $20 bill, Gracie puts it in her purse. Gracie then takes out the bill George gave her and passes it on. With the trial still going on, Gracie inadvertently passes the counterfeit $20 bill to Blanche so she can buy the hat Gracie wants before the store closes. Wanting Blanche to prepare a meal for him, Harry Morton takes the fake bill to give to George so he can go buy the hat. George has a plan to get Harry to pass the fake bill at a cigar store, but it doesn't work. George then tries to have Harry von Zell pass the bill. But, von Zell gives George so many compliments that George doesn't have the heart to do it. Bonnie Sue shows Ronnie a death scene she's been rehearsing. After overhearing Bonnie Sue, von Zell thinks Ronnie is the cause. An upset von Zell goes to tell off George. George explains that it was a dramatic scene. An apologetic von Zell agrees to take the money to buy Gracie's hat. George watches on his TV as Gracie prevents a unanimuous guilty vote. Harry von Zell gets picked up for passing the counterfeit bill and is brought to the court. George manages to get the case dismissed. John Stephenson as The District Attorney. Phillips Tead as A Man Juror. Ralph Clanton as The Jury Foreman. Note: This episode's Vaudeville Afterpiece is titled "Sylvan Allen, The Forest Ranger."
282	30	"Ronnie Makes a Record"	Rod Amateau	Norman Paul, Harvey Helm, Keith Fowler, William Burns	May 5, 1958
Ronnie tells George about a girl he met the night before named Linda Stanley (Roxane Berard). George hopes that Jack Stanley (David Lewis), a producer, can help Ronnie land a deal with Verve Records. Jack says that he spoke with Norman Granz (Lyle Talbot), the President, and they set up a recording date for Ronnie. George does a monologue about Ronnie being a singer, what records need to be a hit and records don't do George justice. Gracie thinks that it's George that wants the record deal. She hears from Jack that Ronnie will be doing the recording. Gracie and Harry von Zell then try to break it to George that he has been spurned, but they can't quite tell him. George leaves and then watches the rest of von Zell and Gracie's conversation on his TV. Linda calls her father Jack and Jack tells her to bring Ronnie to the studio right away. Gracie tells Ronnie that George will be heartbroken that he isn't making a record. Ronnie says he'll talk to Jack and try to get out of doing the recording. Gracie talks to Mr. Granz and tries to get him to let George make a record. Norman says he's making records for the younger crowd and is only interested in Ronnie. He'd like to come by and meet Ronnie. Ronnie goes to the studio and pretends to have lost his voice. Jack tells Ronnie how much George wants him to do the record and Ronnie gets ready for the rehearsal. Gracie asks the Morton's help to get George out of the house. George is watching Blanche and Harry on his TV. When Norman arrives, Gracie tries to pass von Zell off as Ronnie. George enters and explains to Gracie that he wanted the deal for Ronnie and not himself. Everyone one goes to the studio to watch Ronnie record the ballad "She's Kinda Cute". Joby Baker appears as Quartet Member. Note: This episode's Vaudeville Afterpiece is titled "Uncle Ben, The Farmer."
283	31	"Ronnie's Royalty Check"	Rod Amateau	Norman Paul, Harvey Helm, Keith Fowler, William Burns	May 12, 1958
Ronnie has received his first royalty check for his record. Young attractive blonde Shelly Blaine (Lisa Davis), a nightclub singer, comes by to see Ronnie. Ronnie and Shelly are going shopping for a present to give Gracie, that is supposed to be a surprise. Gracie thinks Ronnie is going to spend all his money on Shelly. At the store, the Saleslady (Eleanor Audley) believes Ronnie is buying a dress for Shelly, despite Ronnie saying it's for his mother. Ronnie didn't have quite enough money for the dress he wants to buy, so he borrows the rest from Shelly. Meanwhile, Gracie jumps to the conclusion that Shelly is a gold-digger and tells George. After Gracie leaves, George watches Ronnie and Shelly on his TV. Ronnie hopes to get the money he owes Shelly from George without him knowing what it's for. George does a monologue about Ronnie buying the gift for Gracie, what George's allowance was when he was young and meeting his first gold-digger. Gracie tells Blanche and Harry about Shelly. Blanche and Harry have an argument over her spending. Ronnie tells Shelly that he hid the dress in the closet and George is watching this on his TV. When Ronnie asks George for the money, George turns him down. George suggests Ronnie ask Harry Morton for the money, because Harry is an easy touch. Because Blanche calls Harry a tight-wad, he gives Ronnie the money. Harry sees Ronnie give the money to Shelly, and now also believes she is fleecing Ronnie. Harry von Zell tells Gracie that if Shelly met another man with more money, she would dump Ronnie. Gracie tries to convince Shelly that von Zell is very wealthy. George has von Zell drive Shelly home. George tells Gracie there's a dress hidden in the closet. She reads the note, believes it's for Shelly and returns it. Gracie gets the money for Ronnie, but decides to buy the dress for herself and charges it to George. Note: This episode's Vaudeville Afterpiece is titled "Cousin Hal, The Lifeguard."
284	32	"A Visit from Charles Vidor"	Rod Amateau	Norman Paul, Harvey Helm, Keith Fowler, William Burns	May 19, 1958
George mentions to Gracie that Hungarian film director Charles Vidor will be stopping by. Gracie brings over Blanche to meet Charles. Charles arrives and Gracie tells him how much Blanche and her cried at his latest picture A Farewell to Arms. Gracie tries to get Ronnie's girlfriend Bonnie Sue a part in Vidor's next film, but he says he wants a well known actress. Charles asks George to persuade Jack Benny to emcee an event. George thought he would be asked. Gracie asks Harry von Zell what she can do to make Bonnie Sue more famous. Harry suggests that Gracie spread a story that Bonnie Sue is linked romantically to someone in show business. Harry also tells Gracie to not tell George it was his idea. George does a monologue about how to get good publicity. Gracie places a phony news item that Bonnie Sue is engaged to Harry von Zell. When Ronnie sees the article, he is upset that Bonnie Sue would stoop to that, but she says she had nothing to do with it. Ronnie calls George and pretends it's another girl to make Bonnie Sue jealous. Gracie confesses that she placed the story. Believing the story to be true, the Mortons chastise von Zell, who of course knows nothing about it. George is watching this all on his TV. Harry von Zell figures out that it was Gracie and brings the Mortons to her to explain. George comes up with a plan to prank von Zell. Vidor tells Gracie she needs to hook Bonnie Sue up with someone much more famous. Gracie calls the City Editor (Charles Tannen) and tells him Bonnie Sue is engaged to Vidor. George straightens things out with Vidor. Note: This episode's Vaudeville Afterpiece is titled "Pepe Allen, The Jewel Thief."
285	33	"Ronnie Goes Into the Army"	Rod Amateau	Norman Paul, Harvey Helm, Keith Fowler, William Burns	May 26, 1958
Ronnie receives his draft notice from the US Army, and is told to report to Fort Ord Army Airfield. Gracie tries to establish a military regimen in the Burns household to get Ronnie used to it. This includes an early breakfast at 4:30 in the morning and playing Reveille on a record. Everyone except Ronnie gets up. When George goes to wake Ronnie, he sees Ronnie coming in the front door. Turns out Ronnie's been dating all his girlfriends to say good-bye. George does a monologue about when Ronnie was a boy scout, how Ronnie takes orders well and Gracie missing him when he's away. Bonnie Sue is irate over Ronnie dating others, but he insists she's the only one he really loves. To get her sympathy, he lies and says the Army is stationing him in Alaska. George is watching this conversation on his TV. Gracie gets wind of it, and decides to visit the Army to protest her son going to Alaska. Meanwhile, Harry Von Zell tells the Mortons that he wants to move into Ronnie's room rent free as soon as he leaves for basic training. He figures George is a push over and he can talk George into it. George is watching this on his TV and when von Zell tries to convince George, it doesn't go well. Gracie goes to see Gen. Van Marter (Ned Wever) and the usual confusion occurs between the General and an Army sergeant (William Schallert) there. George solves it all, by telling Van Marter that Ronnie is exempt because he's still enrolled in college. Note: This episode's Vaudeville Afterpiece is titled "Aunt Clara, The Plainclotheswoman." In that era, college students received postponement of military conscription as long as they were enrolled. See Conscription in the United States
286	34	"Locked Out"	Rod Amateau	Norman Paul, Harvey Helm, Keith Fowler, William Burns	June 2, 1958
Gracie and George are going to a dinner party and Ronnie is going out with a girl he just met named Vicki Donovan (Miss USA 1952 Jackie Loughery). She's the hat check girl at the Mocambo. George misses a call from Geoffrey Blake of the BBC. Geoffrey is actually in California, but George thinks he's still in England. George believes the call is about renewing their show in England. Gracie takes Ronnie and Vicki to the dinner party because George needs to wait for Geoffrey's call. George does a monologue about television in England, France and China and George performing in England. After waiting awhile, George and Harry von Zell go to the party. After the party, Gracie jokes about how everytime they're about to walk into the house the phone rings. Gracie has George try it and winds up locking both of them out of the house. Gracie goes to the Morton's for help. Harry Morton has several keys to try, but he breaks one off in the lock. Harry calls for Mr. Elliott (Jack Weston), the locksmith. In explaining how they got locked out in the first place, Gracie locks the Mortons out of their house. Mr. Elliott gets both doors open, but then Gracie manages to lock his tools in the Burns house. To make matters worse, she locks everyone out of the Morton house again. When Ronnie comes home, everyone eventually gets into their house. The next morning George is still trying to reach Geoffrey in England. Geoffrey comes by the house to see George and George tells him about the confusion that occurred last night. Note: This episode's Vaudeville Afterpiece is titled "Samson Allen, The Moving Man."
287	35	"The Week in New York"	Rod Amateau	Norman Paul, Harvey Helm, Keith Fowler, William Burns	June 9, 1958
Gracie makes travel plans to New York for her, George and Ronnie without telling George. Gracie has a confusing conversation with the Travel Clerk (Jack Albertson). Blanche hopes to talk Harry into their going along. George is watching Gracie and Blanche on his TV. Ronnie and Bonnie Sue are looking forward to having the house to themselves to have a party for her birthday. Ronnie even orders a soda fountain machine for the party. He's sure he can get out of going to New York, because he knows how to manipulate his father. George is watching Ronnie on his TV. To have some fun, he tells Ronnie he can stay home to study and George will take Bonnie Sue to New York for her birthday. George does a monologue about how to take a vacation and his family couldn't afford vacations when he was young. Because he thinks George and Gracie are going to Honolulu, Harry Morton agrees to go to New York. George is watching this on his TV and calls Harry to tell him he is going to New York. Harry still believes that George is going to Honolulu and doesn't want the Morton's around. So, Harry decides to show George and go to Honolulu as well. Harry von Zell sees George and Gracie's leaving as an opportunity to use George's box seat baseball tickets to take Gloria (Barbara Stuart) on a date. George was watching von Zell on TV and knows what his plan is. George makes von Zell think he's already given the tickets away, but then gives them to von Zell. Word leaks about Ronnie's party for Bonnie Sue, and everybody decides to stay home to attend the party. Phil Arnold as The Delivery Man. Note: This episode's Vaudeville Afterpiece is titled "Hilton Allen, The Summer Resort Owner."
288	36	"The June Wedding"	Rod Amateau	Norman Paul, Harvey Helm, Keith Fowler, William Burns	June 16, 1958
Ronnie's friends Frank and Linda have just gotten married. Bonnie Sue caught the bridal bouquet. Frank and Linda stop by to talk to Ronnie because apparently he bungled their honeymoon reservations, but he isn't home yet. Gracie invites the young couple to spend their honeymoon at the Burns's home. George is watching this on his TV. George does a monologue about his house being a honeymoon hotel, June being a good time for romance, and things that can throw off a wedding. Ronnie tells Gracie that he believes Bonnie Sue now wants to get married. Meanwhile, Harry Morton complains to George that because of the wedding, Blanche is feeling very romantic. George suggests that Harry be more romantic than Blanche and that might scare her off. Harry has a hard time being romantic with Blanche. Harry von Zell tells George how sad he is because Gloria turned down his marriage proposal. Bonnie Sue comes by and tells Ronnie that she's over wanting to get married, but then she sees Frank and Linda in the garden. Gracie tells Gloria how great marriage is and how wonderful von Zell is. Then Gracie goes off and tells Bonnie Sue how bad marriage is. Bonnie Sue tells her that she's decided that Ronnie and her can wait to get married. Harry von Zell tells George and Gracie that Gloria is still not interested in marriage. Gracie takes a call from the hotel. They want to let Frank know that the honeymoon suite is available. Gracie decides that her and George will stay at the suite. Note: This episode's Vaudeville Afterpiece is titled "Cousin Barney, Amusement Park Manager."
289	37	"Summer School"	Rod Amateau	Norman Paul, Harvey Helm, Keith Fowler, William Burns	June 23, 1958
Ronnie's plans to spend the summer with his actor's stock company at Big Bear Lake. His group will include Ralph, Bonnie Sue and Vicki Donovan. George learns from Professor Ainsworth (Howard Wendell) that Ronnie is flunking Ancient History. Ainsworth says that Ronnie spent more time studying the girls in the class. Ainsworth is teaching a four week summer school class and George demands that Ronnie attend. George does a monologue about having a summer job entertaining at a summer hotel and he's going to make sure Ronnie goes to summer school. Gracie tricks Harry von Zell into going with to see Professor Ainsworth with a scheme to have him be gone for the summer. George is watching this on his TV. Meanwhile, Blanche wants Harry Morton to talk to George on Ronnie's behalf, but Harry refuses. Harry then proceeds to insult Blanche's cooking. George calls Ainsworth to let him know what's going on. At Ainsworth's office, Gracie tries to pass von Zell off as a Venezuelan professor. Ainsworth has some fun with Gracie and Harry. Gracie comes up with another plan to get George to let Ronnie go. George is watching on TV and that plan doesn't work either. But the third times the charm and Ronnie gets to go to Big Bear. Note: This episode's Vaudeville Afterpiece is titled "Aunt Clara, Ladies Baseball Team Manager.".
290	38	"The Grammar School Dance"	Rod Amateau	Norman Paul, Harvey Helm, Keith Fowler, William Burns	September 8, 1958
Ronnie tells Gracie and Blanche that he finally got a date with Patricia (Yvonne Lime). At Gracie's suggestion, Ronnie sent Patricia roses everyday for a week and charged it to George. George is watching this conversation on his TV. George confronts Gracie about the roses. She makes up a story that she's sending the flowers to a little old lady that Blanche hit with her car. George does a monologue about women being sentinmental over flowers and George having a hard time getting a date when he was younger. Ahna Capri appears as love-struck Edie Westrope, president of Ronnie's fan club. She shows up for Ronnie's (forgotten) promise be her escort to her school dance. Gracie's plan is to sidetrack Edie with young Malcolm Rogers, who is as smitten with Edie as she is with Ronnie. Meanwhile, Harry von Zell speaks to Harry Morton about Gloria Gallagher. He proposed to her several times, knowing she had a boyfriend named Louie de Marco (Norman Alden). The last time he talked to her, she accepted even though he didn't propose that time. He wants to get out of the engagement. Morton tells him to have George temporarily fire him. Gloria will return to Louie when she finds out von Zell doesn't have a job. George is watching this conversation on his TV and he plays along and fires von Zell. Malcom comes by and while trying to show him how to win Edie, Ronnie blows his date with Patricia. Louie speaks to George about Gloria and von Zell. George gives him an idea how to get Gloria back. The idea causes Morton to think Blanche is seeing a younger man. In the end, Edie chooses Malcom and Ronnie gets to go out with Patricia. Note: This episode's Vaudeville Afterpiece is titled "Johnny Allen, The Sailor."
291	39	"The Exchange Student"	Rod Amateau	Norman Paul, Harvey Helm, Keith Fowler, William Burns	September 15, 1958
Ronnie brings home foreign exchange student Marcel Renard (French actor Jacques Gallo), who will move into the guest room. George is watching on his TV as Marcel gives Gracie and Blanche some flowers. George is not happy about Marcel staying there and he insists Marcel move to the fraternity house. George does a monologue about continental manners and rules of etiquette. Meanwhile, Harry Morton once again insults Blanche's cooking. When Harry tells Gracie what a nice gesture it is to house a foreign exchange student, she suggests Marcel stay with him. Harry is against it and says he will talk George into keeping Marcel. George is watching this on his TV. Despite trying to turn the tables on Harry, George still winds up with Marcel. Much to Ronnie's dismay Bonnie Sue falls completely under the spell of the very romantic Marcel. Now Ronnie wants Marcel out and has a plan to make George do it. George is watching this on his TV. Gracie and Ronnie talk to George, but Gracie winds up volunteering to tell Marcel to go. Gracie speaks with Harry von Zell and they come up with a plan. But while talking to Marcel, it comes out that Ronnie is upset because of what happened with Bonnie Sue. Marcel tells Gracie that he has a girlfriend named Collette and he will have her come over. Collette falls under Ronnie's spell, causing a jealous Marcel to move back to the dorm. Note: This episode's Vaudeville Afterpiece is titled "Robinson Allen on the Desert Island." Last first-run episode, which ends with the final on-stage dizzy dialogue exchange between George and Gracie that made them famous in their early years. This episode featured the final on-screen appearance of star Gracie Allen, who went straight into retirement.
