= The George Burns and Gracie Allen Show cast list =

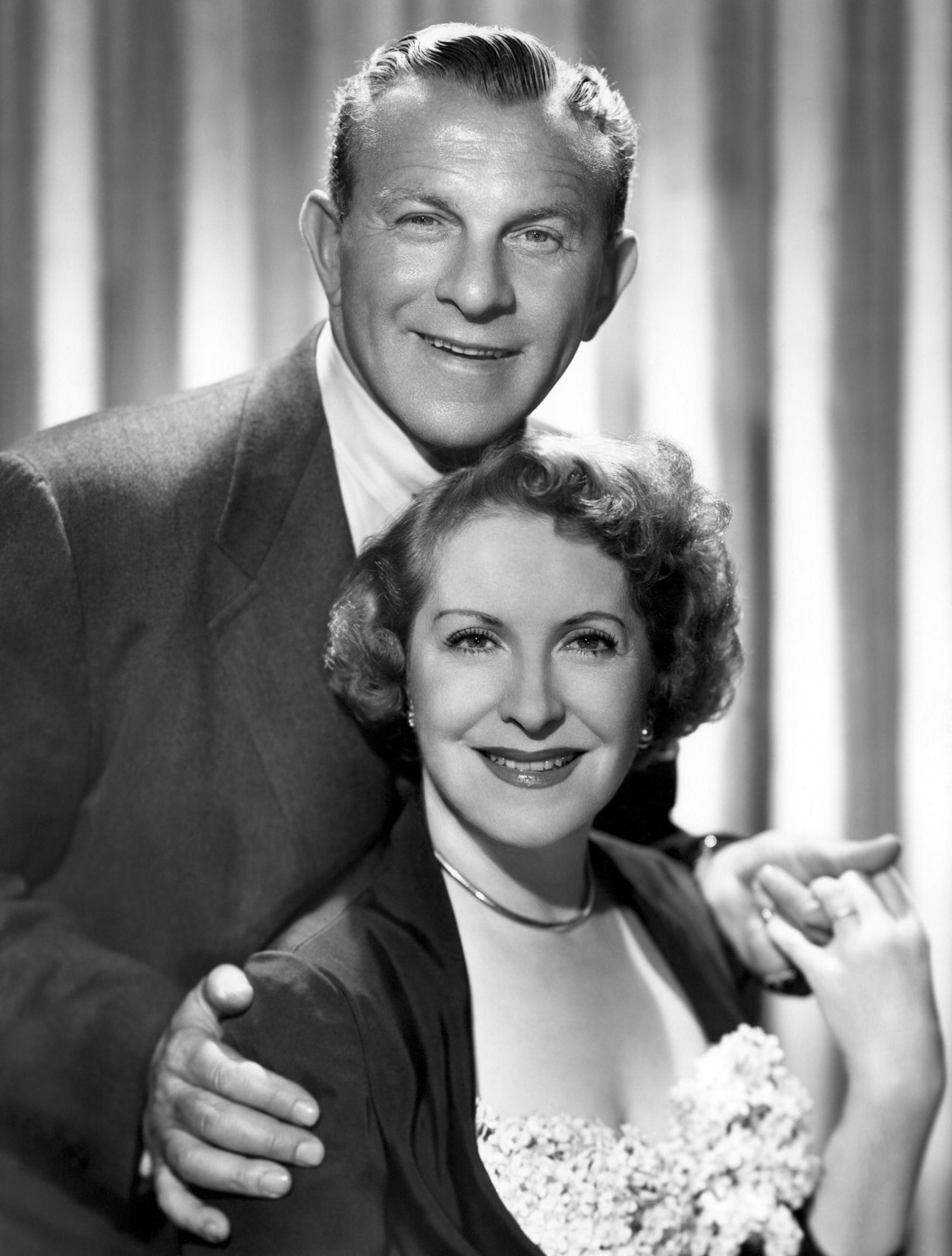
George Burns and Gracie Allen (1952)

The George Burns and Gracie Allen Show, was an American situation comedy television series that ran for 291 episodes over eight seasons (1950–58) on CBS. The show did not become weekly until the third season. The first two seasons of the show were biweekly broadcasts, with the last episode of Season Two being broadcast three weeks after the one that preceded it. The show was based on the Burns and Allen radio show (1929–50), which first ran for three years on the BBC radio network, before airing in the United States on CBS and NBC. The radio show itself was based on the characters George Burns and Gracie Allen had developed in vaudeville. Many of the early television episodes were a re-working of the same episodes that had aired on radio.

Hundreds of actors appeared on the television version, as leads and second leads, recurring roles, and celebrity cameos. While a handful of actors played the same role with each performance, most of the recurring actors played different roles with each appearance. The majority of the cast over the show's eight years were bit-part roles, either one-time, or carried over into other episodes. After Gracie decided to retire, George went solo for one year with The George Burns Show. Some of the original cast members and guest stars carried over to that show. The Burns family, main cast members, and supporting actors who made substantive contributions during the show's run, are listed below. Those who also appeared on George's solo show are so noted.

== Main cast members ==
=== Burns and Allen family ===
- Gracie Allen

292 episodes (1950–58)

- George Burns

292 episodes (1950–58)
25 episodes (1958–59) The George Burns Show as himself
34 episodes (1964–65) Wendy and Me, George as landlord to tenant Wendy Conway (Connie Stevens)
13 episodes (1985) George Burns Comedy Week anthology series, as host

- Ronnie Burns (son)

24 episodes (1951–58) as himself, as well as other characters during the run of the show
23 episodes (1958–59) of The George Burns Show as himself

- Sandra Burns (daughter)

13 episodes (1951–57), rarely on camera, usually just as a voice on the telephone

=== The Mortons ===
- Bea Benaderet – Blanche Morton

292 episodes (1950–58). Benaderet had also played Blanche on the radio version of the show. She was the only actor besides George and Gracie who appeared in all episodes.
25 episodes (1958–59) of The George Burns Show, also as Blanche Morton

Benaderet's career began in San Francisco theatre and expanded to San Francisco radio, where she wrote, produced, sang and acted. She soon became the semi-regular character of wise-cracking telephone operator Gertrude Gearshift on the radio version of The Jack Benny Program. Following her successful decade working with Burns and Allen on radio, she continued with her career in the media of television. On I Love Lucy in the 1952 episode "Lucy Plays Cupid", Benederet played the Ricardo's neighbor Miss Lewis, who asks Lucy's help in getting her a date with local grocer Mr. Ritter (Edward Everett Horton). Benaderet had a recurring co-starring role as Cousin Pearl Bodine, mother of Max Baer Jr.'s character Jethro Bodine on The Beverly Hillbillies (1962–67). Benederet was the voice of Betty Rubble in 112 episodes of The Flintstones (1960–64). She starred in her own sitcom Petticoat Junction (1963–70).

Four different actors played Blanche Morton's husband Harry during the run of the show:

- Hal March – Harry Morton #1

11 episodes (1950–51). March had played Harry Morton on radio in 1940, and continued in that role during the first episodes of the television show.

He also appeared in two episodes as fictional producer Dick Fisher, "The Musical Scam" and "George Sneezing; Gracie Thinks He's Insane" (1952), two episodes as Harry Morton's business partner Casey, "Von Zell's Girlfriend Between Trains" and "Gracie Buying a Ranch for George" (1953), and in the episode "Wardrobe Woman Wins Free Trip to Hawaii" (1952) as Michael Rockford of the Matrimonial Bureau.

March was a radio, television and film actor, mostly of the comedic genre. Other radio shows he appeared on included The Alan Young Show (1940), the radio version of December Bride (1952–53), as a vocalist on the Hoagy Carmichael Show (1944–45), as co-host with Bob Sweeney of the Sweeny and March show (1946–48), That's Rich radio sitcom (1954), and Young Love radio sitcom (1949–50). He became one of television's pioneer game show hosts when he took over The $64,000 Question (1955– 58).

- John Brown – Harry Morton #2

Seven episodes (January – June, 1951)
His professional credentials included radio appearances such as the Damon Runyon Theater, and Fred Allen's radio show. Brown's career fell to the Hollywood blacklist scare. Afraid of being targeted as Communist sympathizers, studios and producers distanced themselves from anyone on the list. During his brief role as Harry Morton, Brown's name appeared in Red Channels, a US Government publication that listed alleged Communists in the entertainment industry. George Burns, who produced the show under the umbrella McCadden Productions, removed Brown from the show in 1951. Brown's career continued as an unaccredited background voice on radio and in films. He died in 1957.

- Fred Clark – Harry Morton #3

75 episodes (1951–53)
Clark was primarily a film and television actor, who appeared in 58 feature-length films, and numerous television shows. Clark was also a stage actor, who was cast in mostly comedy roles.

- Larry Keating – Harry Morton #4

199 episodes (1953–58)
24 episodes of The George Burns Show (1958–59) as Harry Morton
As with others of the cast, Keating had a background in radio. He was a host assistant on the Blue Network game show County Fair (1945–50), and was a cast member of Bob Hope's The Pepsodent Show, as well as numerous other radio shows.

=== Announcers (also appeared onscreen as themselves) ===
- Bill Goodwin

25 episodes (1950–51), as an announcer, and as a comedic version of himself. Goodwin had appeared on the Burns and Allen radio show in multiple character roles, in addition to announcing the actors, for most of the radio show's entire run until it ended in 1950. With the advent of the television show, he continued as both an announcer and as an actor for the first 23 episodes of the television show. Before television, Goodwin had been a radio announcer on the Al Pearce Show (1935–36), and was the star of his own comedy Bill Goodwin Show (1947) on CBS. During the same era, he was the announcer for the Blondie (1939) radio show, Bob Hope's The Pepsodent Show (1938–48) on radio, and numerous other shows of the era. His final episode as the Burns and Allen TV announcer was ""Gracie's Vegetarian Plot"" on August 2, 1951, after which Harry von Zell assumed the role of announcer. Goodwin continued as a television actor until his 1958 death.

- Harry von Zell

268 episodes (1951–58), He was both the show's announcer, and a comedic caricature of himself that he had also portrayed on the radio show. The only actor besides George, Gracie and Benaderet who exceeded 200 episodes. von Zell took over as the show's announcer from Bill Goodwin on August 16, 1951 with the episode ""Space Patrol Kids Visit""
25 episodes (1958–59) of The George Burns Show, as Mr. Knox

== Supporting cast ==
=== Elvia Allman ===
Seven episodes (1952–54) as Gracie's dressmaker friend Jane.

Allman was also the voice of many cartoon characters. She appeared as Cora Dithers, wife of Dagwood Bumstead's boss, in the Blondie radio series (1939–50) on CBS Radio and the Blue network. Allman was a regular as the man-chasing character Cobina on The Pepsodent Show with Bob Hope. She joined the Burns and Allen radio show cast in 1942, as Gracie's friend Tootsie Sagwell. Allman was cast in numerous radio and television parts, including her I Love Lucy role (1952) in the "Job Switching" episode as the conveyor belt foreman when Lucy and Ethel get a job in a chocolate factory. She also had a recurring role in Petticoat Junction as Selma Plout (1963–1974). Allman was Granny Clampett's gossip rival Elverna Bradshaw in 13 episodes of The Beverly Hillbillies (1963–1970).

=== Madge Blake ===
One episode (1955) as Mrs. Rudy in "Vanderlip Leaves His Parakeet with George"

Blake ultimately became famous as Bruce Wayne's Aunt Harriet in the Batman (TV series) (1966–67). She began her acting career in midlife, determined to be successful after a director criticized everything about her and told her to go home. Along the way, she was Larry Mondello's mother, Margaret Mondello (1958–60) on the CBS/ABC sitcom Leave It to Beaver. Blake appeared in numerous films and on television shows, including several television episodes (1955–64) as the president of Jack Benny's fan club. She also appeared in 26 episodes of The Real McCoys (1957–63) as Flora MacMichael.

=== Peter Brocco ===
Eight episodes (1955–56)

Peter the giggling hotel waiter in the New York episodes. He giggles and documents every crazy thing he hears Gracie say.
"Ronnie Arrives", "Ronnie Meets Sabrina", "George Becomes a Dictator", "Ronnie's Elopement", "Company for Christmas", "Gracie Pawns Her Ring", "The Musical Version" (1955)
"George Needs Glasses" (1956)

Brocco was a stage, screen and television character actor who appeared in over 300 feature-length films and television episodes (1932–1991).

=== King Donovan ===
Eight episodes (1954–56)

Bookstore clerk, ""George Invites Critics to Watch First Show of Season" (1954)
Seven episodes as Roger Baker, Blanche Morton's deadbeat brother.(1955–56)

Donovan was a comedic actor who appeared in 57 feature-length films (1948–1984), and had a background in Broadway theatre. He was primarily known for his television roles, both as an actor and as a director.(1952–1982) Donovan often collaborated with his wife, comedic television actress Imogene Coca.

=== Douglass Dumbrille ===
Seven episodes (1954–58)

Two episodes (1954) Mr. Peters, "George Teaches Gracie Not to Start Rumors" and Mr. Dykes, "Gracie Buys Old Movies to Sell to Television"
Two episodes (1955) Arthur J. Cahill, "Company for Christmas" and Judge Russell, "Gracie Gets a Ticket 'Fixed' by the Judge"
Brig. Gen. Masterson, "The General" (1957)
Two episodes (1958) as Judge Strickland, "Gracie and the Jury" and "Blanche Gets a Jury Notice"

Two episodes (1958–59) of The George Burns Show, as Mr. Knox
His first acting role was on Broadway, in the 1924 stage production of Macbeth. Dumbrille appeared in hundreds of television and film roles, dating back to the silent film era.

=== Robert Ellis ===
15 episodes (1956–58) as Ronnie's college friend Ralph Grainger.
Frank Foster, one episode (1956)
Charlie, one episode (1956)

As a child actor under the name "Bobby Ellis", he had played Henry Aldrich on both radio and television.

=== James Flavin ===
Nine episodes (1951–55)

Six episodes as Detective Sawyer (1951–53), the confused and frustrated police detective whom Gracie (or George) called whenever they wanted to report a crime.
Frank "Wardrobe Woman Wins Free Trip to Hawaii" (1952)
Montague the Private Eye "Dual Meanings" (1955)
Mr. Rigney "Ronnie's Elopement" (1955)

Flavin was a character actor whose career lasted for nearly half a century. In addition to his television roles, he appeared in 371 feature-length films.

=== Irene Hervey ===
Five episodes (1955, 1958)

Four (1955) episodes as Clara Bagley, "Gracie Plays Talent Scout for Imitator", "Gracie Adopts Great Dane Dog", "Blanche and Clara Bagley Leave Their Husbands", "No Seats for Friar's Club Dinner"
One episode (1958) as Florence Henderson, "Softening the Professor"

A native of Los Angeles, her early experience was on the stage at Venice High School, prior to being signed as an MGM contract player. She appeared in 51 feature-length films. Making the transition to television in 1952, she continued acting for the next three decades.

=== John Hoyt ===
Five episodes (1954–56)

Mr. Otis "George Gets Black Eye from Open Door" (1954)
Mr. Perry in "George and the 14-Karat Gold Trombone" (1955)
Mr. William J. Brewster in "Appearances Are Deceiving " (1956)
Attorney Brewster in "The Night Out " (1956)
Mr. Jenkins in "The Interview" (1956)

Comedian, film and television actor, with a stage background at the Orson Welles Mercury Theatre. In 1948, he appeared in the short-lived Shorty Bell CBS Radio show. Hoyt was cast as managing editor of a newspaper, with Mickey Rooney in the title roll of an aspiring reporter.

=== Joseph Kearns ===
12 episodes (1951–54)

Ralph Hanley "The Income Tax Man" (1951)
The psychiatrist "Gracie Goes to a Psychiatrist" (1951)
Dr. Johnson "Trip to Palm Springs" (1952)
Mr. Binkley "Gracie's Redecoration Scheme" (1952)
The doctor "The Spectacular Spectacle Debacle" (1952)
Mr. Blackwell "Gracie Having George's Portrait Painted" (1952)
Sampter Clayton "Sampter Clayton Ballet/Selling Tickets" (1952)
Mr. Welbert "Gracie and Harry Morton/Missing Persons Bureau" (1953)
Dr. Merkin "Morton Buys Iron Deer/Gracie Thinks George Needs Glasses" (1953)
Joe the tramp "Gracie Gets a Business Manager" (1953)
Monte Factor "George Gets Call from Unknown Victor" (1954)
Mr. Tavelman "Gracie Buys a Toaster Wholesale" (1954)

Sometimes listed as Joe Kearns, he was essentially a character actor who found work in radio, television and film. Kearns had a strong background in radio, where he made his first appearances on the Burns and Allen show. On both radio and television, Kearns appeared on Jack Benny's programs, including in the role of a guard at Jack Benny's (fictitious) vault beneath Beverly Hills – the running gag being that the guard had been protecting Benny's money since the American Revolutionary War. Baby boomers possibly remember him most for his final role, the cranky neighbor George Wilson on the Dennis the Menace television show.

=== Walter Woolf King ===
Seven episodes (1952–56)

Three episodes (1952) Dr. Philips in "George Sneezing/Gracie Thinks He's Insane"; Mr. Slayton in "Gracie and Blanche Want to Redecorate"; the attorney in "Divorce Attorney"
Mr. Stoneham, "George and Harry Mad at Each Other" (1953)
Mr. Trent, "Blanche and Brother Roger Move in with the Burnses: (1955)
Two episodes (1956) the doorman,"Ronnie Is Lovesick"; Mr. Flether, "Ronnie Gets an Agent"

Veteran Broadway musical star, who also appeared on radio as the emcee for the 1936 episodes of The Beatrice Lillie Show on NBC, as well as the show's re-named The Flying Red Horse Tavern on CBS. He successfully made a transition to films and television.

=== Peter Leeds ===
Six episodes (1953,1955)

Four episodes (1953) Booking agent, "Problem Husbands"; Perry & Pete, "Gracie's Cousins/Sneak Thieves"; Mr. Stephans, "Gracie Reports Car Stolen", Mr. Garland, "Gracie on Train/Murder".
Two episodes (1955) The cab driver. "Gracie Helps Lola"; Red Benson, "George and the Glendale Eagle Publicity Stunt"

Prolific actor who appeared on numerous radio programs, and more than 8,000 television shows. He served as the 1971–1976 president of the Los Angeles chapter of American Federation of Television and Radio Artists. He also was a performer on 14 of Bob Hope's tours to entertain the overseas United States military troops.

=== Sheldon Leonard ===
Four episodes (1951–1953)

Two episodes as gangster Johnny Velvet: "Johnny Velvet's Day in Court" (1951); :Gracie Sees a Hold-Up/Johnny Velvet (1953)
Two episodes as gangster Silky Thompson: "Silky Thompson Moves to Beverly Hills (1951)"; "Silky Thompson/Gracie Writes 'My Life with George Burns'" (1952)

Leonard was an actor whose heavy New York accent was an asset to his character roles. He was also a director, writer and producer. In the early 1930s, he acted in Broadway productions. He appeared as an actor on several radio shows: Broadway Is My Beat, The Damon Runyan Theatre, The Halls of Ivy, The Jack Benny Program, Johnny Fletcher, Judy Canova Show, The Lineup, Maise, The Martin and Lewis Show, Meet Me at Parky's, Mr. and Mrs. Blandings, Omar, The Mystic, The Phil Harris-Alice Faye Show and Presenting Charles Boyer. During the 1950s and 1960s, Leonard produced many of the era's popular television shows. From 1939 through 1978, he appeared in 71 feature-length films.

=== Howard McNear ===
10 episodes (1953–58)

Gracie's Uncle Clyde the unemployed paper shredder, "Uncle Clyde Comes to Visit; Renting Room" (January 1, 1953)
Bob Hill, "Gracie Helps Morton Get CPA Account" (October 12, 1953)
Mr. Lambert, "The Stolen Plants" (March 12, 1956)
Cuthbert Jantzen the plumber, seven episodes (1957–58)

McNear came to the show with an extensive background in both television and radio, and had originated the role of Doc Adams on the radio version of Gunsmoke. His most familiar role to television audiences was as Floyd Lawson, the barber on The Andy Griffith Show (1961–1967). Parley Baer who played Mayor Roy Stoner on the Andy Griffith show described McNear as, "The dearest man. There was just nobody who didn't like him."

=== Lewis Martin ===
Five episodes (1953–58)

Mr. Loomis "The Musical Version" (November 7, 1955)
Mr. Paris the hotel owner "The Stray Dog" (April 1, 1957)
Three episodes as Ronnie's university professor Maynard Henderson (1957–58)

One episode (1958) as Mr. Knox in the "George's Eviction" episode of The George Burns Show

Lewis Martin was a stage, screen and television actor. His two-decade career on the Broadway stage began in 1925. Between 1950 and 1963, Martin appeared in 42 feature length films. His television career began in 1949 and continued through 1967.

=== Judi Meredith ===
24 episodes (1956–58) as Bonnie Sue McAfee, Ronnie Burns' aspiring actress girlfriend from Texas.
12 episodes (1958–59) of The George Burns Show, also as Bonnie Sue McAfee.

In real life, she was born in Portland, Oregon, and joined the Ice Follies as a teenager, but was sidelined following an unrelated skiing accident. She began appearing as an actress at the Pasadena Playhouse, and was spotted by George Burns. In addition to her 24 episodes as Bonnie Sue on The George Burns and Gracie Allen Show, she continued the role for a subsequent 12 episodes on the (1958–59) George Burns Show.

=== Doris Packer ===
16 episodes (1954–56), varied roles

Mrs. Bellamy of the Beverly Hills Philharmonic Society, "Burnses & Mortons Going to Hear Antonelli Concert" (1954)
Mrs. Weber the party decorator, "Gracie Gives a Baby Shower for Virginia Beasley" (1954)
Woman in a pharmacy waiting to use a pay phone, "George Trying to Keep Doctor's Appointment" season 5 ep 6 (1954)
Woman who wants to use a coin operated telephone, "George Resting for Insurance Examination" season 4, ep 32 (1954) (listed on ImDB, but likely an error duplication of "George Trying to Keep Doctor's Appointment")
Margie Clark,"George Teaches Gracie Not to Start Rumors" (1954)
Mrs. Reilly, "Emily Vanderlip's Elopement" (1954)
Mrs. Pringle, "Gracie Gets a Valet for George" (1955)
Mrs. Millicent Sohmers (1956) – Nine episodes; Mrs. Sohmers is part of the socially elite of Oyster Bay, New York. She first meets the Burns and Morton families during their Season 6 trip to New York. Mrs. Sohmers moves to Pasadena, California in Season 7.

Packer was a stage actress on Broadway prior to her World War II enlistment in the Women's Army Auxiliary Corps (WAACs). She later appeared in 7 films, and on numerous television shows, including the 1957–1963 recurring character of Mrs. Cornelia Rayburn, Theodore Cleaver's elementary school principal in the television series Leave It to Beaver.

=== Grandon Rhodes ===
16 episodes (1953–56)

Mr. Cummings in "Gracie Pretends to Be a College Boy's Mother" (1953)
1st Doctor in "Gracie Gets George in the Army" (1953)
14 episodes as banker Chester Vanderlip (1953–56)

Rhodes was primarily a stage actor, who also appeared in 100 films, many of them uncredited. In one of those films, Jailhouse Rock, he appeared as the music professor August van Alden, who during a party tried to draw Vince Everett (Elvis Presley) into an intellectual conversation about Jazz music. Rhodes also portrayed Judge Kippen, in "The Case of the Restless Redhead" debut episode for the original Perry Mason 1957 TV series, appearing on the series a total of 16 times in the role of a judge.

=== William Schallert ===
Four episodes (1955–58)

Pete from the paint store, "Gracie Becomes a Portrait Artist After Museum Visit" (1955)
Charlie Irwin Jr., "Gracie Wants the House Painted" (1955)
The Waiter in "Cyrano De Bergerac" (1956)
The Army Sergeant, "Ronnie Goes Into the Army" (1958)

President of the Screen Actors Guild (1979–81), Schallert was a veteran film and television actor who appeared in approximately 400 roles, the majority of which were on television.

=== Rolfe Sedan ===
27 episodes (1953–55) as Mr. Beasley the mailman for 26 episodes, and in the 1953 episode "Gracie Gets George in the Army" as Harry Morton's insurance doctor.

Born as Edward Sedan, his career began as a dancer in vaudeville where he told jokes and became adept at dialects. He also appeared in Broadway theatre productions. His radio show career encompassed the Blue Network broadcast of Happy Island (1944–45), playing an advisor to Ed Wynn's King Bubbles. He was a cast member on the ABC broadcast I Love Adventure (1948). Sedan was a regular cast member of NBC radio sitcom The Halls of Ivy (1950–52). Two decades after the Burns and Allen television show had broadcast its last episode, Sedan was still active in his profession, as a member of the Sears Radio Theater (1979) broadcast on CBS Radio. The entirety of his career included hundreds of television shows and feature-length movies.

=== Sarah Selby ===
10 episodes (1951–56)

Four episodes in seasons 1 and 2, as Gracie's friend Mrs. Mamie Kelly who made repeated visits with her large number of children.
Six episodes In seasons 4 thorough season 6 as Lucille Vanderlip, the society hostess wife of wealthy banker Chester Vanderlip. In season 5, episode 13 "Gracie Thinks Bob Cummings Is in Love with Her", the Vanderlips live next door to George and Gracie.

Selby began her career in radio in 1940, and continued on television and in films, until 1972.

=== Bob Sweeney ===
Seven episodes – multiple characters (1950–53)

Mr. Elliott, "Gracie and George Locked Out of Their House" (1953)
Mr. Dalton, "Gracie Takes Spanish Lessons" (1953)
Mr. Standish, "Gracie Selling Swamp So Harry Will Buy TV Set" (1952)
Hal Hackett, "Gracie Buying Boat for George" (1952)
Mr. Phillips, the gardener, "The Football Game" (1951)
The gardener, "Gracie Goes to a Psychiatrist" (1951)
Tax assessor, "The Property Tax Assessor" (1950)

He was an Emmy Award winning director for his work with Hawaii Five-O and The Love Boat. In addition to his directing work, he was a comedian, actor, producer, and radio personality. Working at KYA Radio in San Francisco, he collaborated with his fellow announcer Hal March to form the comedy duo "March and Sweeney". They appeared on the CBS/ABC radio The Hoagy Carmichael Show (1944–45) and had their own show Sweeny and March (1946–48). Sweeney branched out on his own on the NBC Radio situation comedy The Halls of Ivy (1950–52), and on NBC as the boyfriend of lead character in detective spoof Sara's Private Caper (1953), as well as appearing on CBS with shows Cousin Willie sit com (1953) and On Stage anthology series (1953–54).

=== Lyle Talbot ===
Seven episodes (1954–58)

Five episodes (1954) as Harry Morton's friend Al Simon

"Gracie Has to Sell George's Car by Five O'Clock", "The Old Grads", "George Gets Black Eye from Open Door", "Gracie and George Have a Mystery Anniversary", "Burnses and Mortons Choosing Movie to Attend"

One episode (1956) as Mr. Jack Devlin in "Ronnie Gets an Agent"
One episode (1958) as Norman Granz in "Ronnie Makes a Record"

Talbot was a founding member of the Screen Actors Guild in 1935, and appeared in 164 feature-length films. His presence on American television was ubiquitous (1950–1986), most notably as neighbor Joe Randolph for 90 episodes of The Adventures of Ozzie and Harriet (1955–1966). Talbot was literally born into show business, as the son of Mississippi riverboat performers. As a teenager, he began performing as a magician in traveling tent shows. After he formed the Lyle Talbot Players acting company, a talent agent got him into movies.

=== Herb Vigran ===
Five episodes (1951–55)

The pest control man, "Too Much of the Mortons" (1951)
The man in the dentist's office, "Vanderlip Buys Black Negligee for His Wife" (1954)
Three episodes (1955), The man with the money order, "George's Mother-in-Law Trouble"; The delivery man, "Lucille Vanderlip Gives a Barbeque Party"; the Cab Driver, "Gracie Pawns Her Ring.

Vigran began his acting career on the Broadway stage, and soon afterwards found work in radio, due to his unique voice. When he transitioned to film and television, Vigran was cast in character parts. He appeared in 127 feature-length films (1934–1987), and hundreds of television shows. In the I Love Lucy episode "Lucy Is Envious", Vigran is the film promoter who has Lucy and Ethel dress up as Martians.

=== Howard Wendell ===
Eight episodes (1954–58)

Four episodes (1954)

Mr. Evans, "The Old Grads"; the druggist, "George Resting for Insurance Examination"; Mr. Weatherby, "Harry Morton's Alumni Banquet"; (role unknown) "George Trying to Keep Doctor's Appointment"

Two episodes (1955)

Mr. Downs, "Gracie Gets an Extension Visa for Jeanette Duval"; Mr. Martindale, "Harry Morton's Cocktail Party"

Professor Tavelman, "With or Without Glasses" (1957)
Professor Ainsworth,"Summer School" (1958)

One episode (1959) of The George Burns Show, as Mr. Daughter

Wendell's career began in Ohio, on radio and in stage shows. He appeared in Broadway theatre productions (1947–1951) before relocating to California. Over the course of his career, he appeared in 23 feature-length films, and approximately 100 television episodes (1949–1971).

=== Frank Wilcox ===
16 episodes, (1953–57) as various characters on the show:

Larry Heath "Gracie Thinks George is Retiring from Show Business" (1953)
Five episodes (1954)

Mr. Brooks, "Harry Morton's Alumni Banquet"
Henry Mills, "One Week to Live"
Dr. Lowery, "Gracie Goes to Psychiatrist for Blanche's Dream"
Dr. Carruthers. "Harry Morton Is Missing"
Mr. Gill, "George Reading Play to Be Done in London"

Dr. Bellamy, "George and the Missing Five Dollars and Missing Baby Pictures" (1955)
Five episodes (1955–56) as Mr. Boardman, wealthy father of Ronnie's fellow actor and Greenwich Village roommate, Jim Boardman

"Ronnie Moves to the Village", "Anniversary Party ", "Ronnie Is Lovesick", "Burlesk", "George Goes Skiing"

Prof. Robert Gordon, "Ronnie Quits College Because His Father Goes Broke" (1956)

Two episodes (1957) as interior decorator Michael Rockford: "$15,000.00 Error" and "The Termites"
Prof. Clinton, "The Home Graduation" (1957)"

Wilcox appeared in over 300 films and television shows, which included recurring roles as a judge in the Perry Mason television series (1957–60), and as oil executive John Brewster on The Beverly Hillbillies (1962–66).

=== Jean Willes ===
Eight episodes (1954–57)

Mary Jane, "Gracie Saves Blanche's Marriage" (1954)
Three episodes (1955) Alice, "Gracie and George Try for a Day at the Beach" and "Gracie Gets an Extension Visa for Jeanette Duval"; Miss Tuttle, "Blanche's Brother, Roger the Moocher, Visits"
Two episodes (1956) Harry von Zell's former girlfriend Alice Emory, "Alice Gets Married"; Geraldine "The Costume Party"
Two episodes (1957) Madame Olga, "The Fortune Teller"; Ruth Emerson, "A Marital Mix-Up"

One episode (1959) of The George Burns Show, as Norma Willis.
Willes was a veteran character actress of 57 feature-length films (1943–1975) and approximately 150 television shows.

== See also ==
- List of The George Burns and Gracie Allen Show episodes

== Bibliography ==
- Dunning, John (1998). On the Air : The Encyclopedia of Old-Time Radio. New York : Oxford University Press. ISBN 978-0-19-507678-3.
- Brooks, Tim (2007). The complete directory to prime time network and cable TV shows, 1946-present (9th, completely rev. and updated, Ballantine books trade pbk. ed.). New York. ISBN 9780345497734.
