= Society Mugs =

- Directed by: Edward Bernds
- Written by: Elwood Ullman
- Produced by: Hugh McCollum
- Starring: Shemp Howard; Tom Kennedy; Christine McIntyre; Vernon Dent; Rebel Randall; Etta McDaniel; Charles Williams; Gene Roth; Bess Flowers; Snub Pollard
- Edited by: Henry Batista
- Distributed by: Columbia Pictures
- Release date: September 16, 1946
- Running time: 16:03
- Country: United States
- Language: English

Society Mugs is a 1946 American short comedy film directed by Edward Bernds and starring Shemp Howard and Tom Kennedy. It was written by Elwood Ullman and produced by Hugh McCollum for Columbia Pictures.

== Plot ==
High society woman Muriel Allen wants to attend a swanky dinner party thrown by friend Alice Preston but husband Arthur decides instead to go on a fishing trip. Rather than showing up stag to the party, Muriel tells housekeeper Petunia to call the Acme Escort Service to bring a few "college boy" escorts. However, Petunia accidentally calls the Acme Exterminator Co., operated by Shemp and Tom.

At the mansion, the duo are assumed to be cultured old college seniors. Guest of honor Lord Wafflebottom follows the pest exterminators' lead in proper American party manners, turning the dinner party into an uncouth display. When mice are conveniently spotted, the boys go to work, disrupting the party and the entire mansion.

== Cast ==
- Shemp Howard as Acme Exterminator operative
- Tom Kennedy as Acme Exterminator operative
- Christine McIntyre as Muriel Allen
- Charles Williams as Arthur Allen
- Rebel Randall as Alice Preston
- Etta McDaniel as Petunia
- Vernon Dent as Lord Wafflebottom
- Bess Flowers as dinner guest

== Production notes ==
Society Mugs is a remake of Termites of 1938 starring The Three Stooges. Bess Flowers, who appears in Society Mugs, also appeared in Termites of 1938.
