= Judi Meredith =

American actress

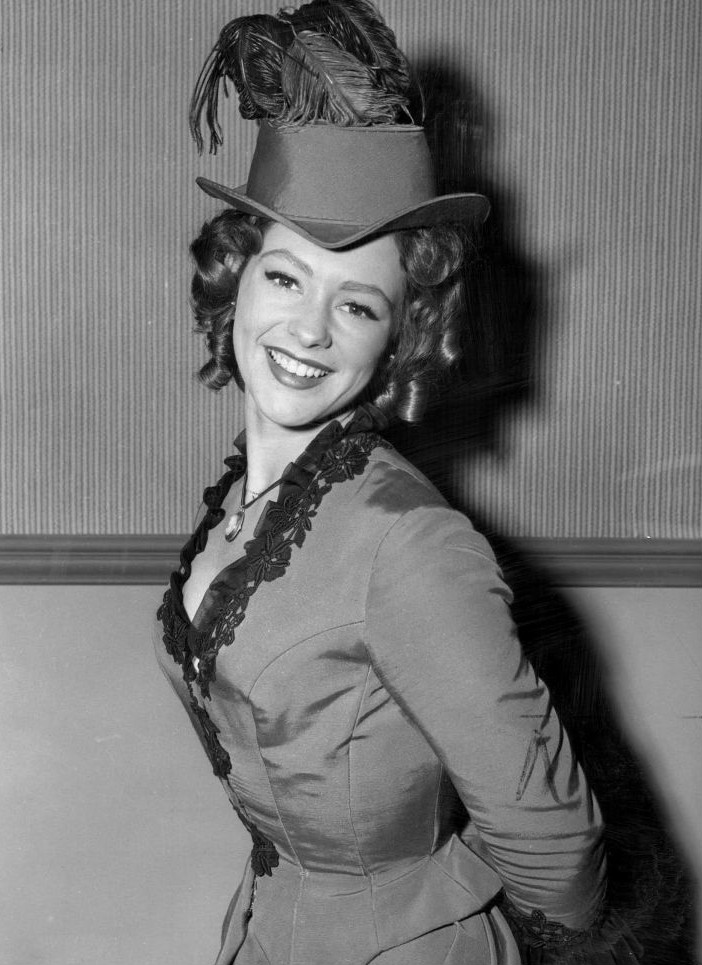
- Meredith as Monique Deveraux, 1960
- Born: Judith Clare Boutin; October 13, 1936; Portland, Oregon, U.S.
- Died: April 30, 2014 (aged 77); Las Vegas, Nevada, U.S.
- Occupations: Actress, figure skater
- Years active: 1956-1973
- Spouse: Gary Nelson (1962-2014; her death)
- Children: 2

Judi Clare Meredith (born Judith Clare Boutin; October 13, 1936 – April 30, 2014) was an American actress.

== Early life ==
Born on October 13, 1936, to Herbert Boutin (1904–1989) and Janice M. Boutin (née Starr, 1908–1978) in Portland, Oregon, Meredith graduated from Academy of the Holy Child Jesus in Portland.

== Skating ==
Meredith was a figure skater who became a professional star performer with the Ice Follies. She broke her back in an accident, but returned to skating until she broke her knee cap and was advised by doctors to stop.

== Acting career ==
Meredith was performing in stock until she was spotted at the Pasadena Playhouse by George Burns, who cast her in several small roles on The George Burns and Gracie Allen Show beginning in 1955.

Through mid-1957, she appeared in small roles on a number of TV shows (including Burns and Allen) billed under her real name of Judi Boutin. Eventually, she assumed the name Judi Meredith, and was cast by Burns in the supporting role of Bonnie Sue McAfee on the Burns and Allen show, becoming a recurring performer on the show in 1957–58. In 1958–59, she appeared in a recurring role as herself (in the role of the girlfriend of Ronnie Burns) on the follow-up series The George Burns Show. 1958 also saw Meredith's film debut, Wild Heritage.

Throughout the 1960s and through early 1970s, Meredith worked steadily, mostly as a guest performer in several American TV series, including Bonanza, The Investigators, 87th Precinct, Wagon Train, Tales of Wells Fargo, Gunsmoke, Rawhide, Laramie, Have Gun – Will Travel, Death Valley Days, Mannix, The Tall Man, and Hawaii Five-O. She was also on The Restless Gun in 1958. Her last screen credit was a guest appearance on a 1973 episode of Toma, following which she retired from acting and left the public eye.

== Personal life ==
In 1962, Meredith married director Gary Nelson with whom she had two sons.

== Death ==
Meredith died in Las Vegas, Nevada, aged 77, from undisclosed causes. She was survived by her husband and two sons.

== Selected filmography ==
- Wild Heritage (1958)
- Money, Women and Guns (1958)
- The Restless Gun (1958) Episode "Tomboy"
- Have Gun, Will Travel (1959)
- Summer Love (1958)
- Jack the Giant Killer (1962)
- The Raiders (1963)
- The Night Walker (1964)
- Dark Intruder (1965)
- Queen of Blood (1966)
- Something Big (1971)
