= Lisa Davis (actress) =

British actress

- Born: Shirley Ann Davis
- Other names: Lisa Davis Waltz; Lisa Davis Waltz-White; Lisa White
- Occupation: Actress
- Years active: 1947–1970
- Spouses: Patrick Waltz (m. 1958; div. 1971) Rudy Challenger (m. 1973; div. 1978) Brian R. White (m. 1979)
- Children: 3
- Relatives: Beryl Davis (sister)

Lisa Davis is an English retired actress, who appeared in her first role at the age of 11 in the film The Woman in the Hall (1949). Her elder sister was singer Beryl Davis.

== Biography ==
Born Shirley Ann Davis into a show business family, her father was Harry Lomax Davis, who led the Oscar Rabin Orchestra, her mother was Queenie (née Ayres), and her older sister was feature singer Beryl Davis. Lisa appeared in 26 film and television projects from 1949 to 1962, appearing in guest spots in such shows as The George Burns Show, The Jack Benny Program, Perry Mason, The Beverly Hillbillies, and 77 Sunset Strip, among others. She provided the voice of Anita Radcliffe in One Hundred and One Dalmatians (1961). She was briefly under contract with Metro-Goldwyn-Mayer. Davis was one of several actresses considered for the role of Princess Aouda in Around the World in 80 Days (1956) after Shirley MacLaine rejected it twice. Although Davis was scheduled to test for the role, MacLaine was ultimately chosen.

== Personal life ==
Waltz was married to actor Patrick Waltz from 28 June 1958 to January 1971. The couple had three children together, daughters Carrie (born 14 June 1959) and Wendy (born 28 March 1965), and son Tim (born 16 August 1966). Soon after the couple's divorce, Patrick Waltz died of a heart attack on 13 August 1972.

She began dating black stage and screen actor Rudy Challenger. They wed on 31 December 1973. The interracial marriage was covered in Jet magazine during that week. She filed for divorce from Challenger in April 1976, then the couple divorced on 14 September 1978, after almost two and a half years of separation. She later married Brian R. White in a private ceremony in Los Angeles on 12 May 1979.

== Partial filmography ==
- The Woman in the Hall (1947) - Jay Blake as a child
- The Man from Yesterday (1949) - Gloria Amersley
- The Long Gray Line (1955) - Nell (uncredited)
- The Virgin Queen (1955) - Jane (uncredited)
- Spy Chasers (1955) - Princess Ann
- Glory (1956) - Candy Trent
- Fury at Gunsight Pass (1956) - Kathy Phillips
- The Best Things in Life Are Free (1956) - Limp Party Girl (uncredited)
- Baby Face Nelson (1957) - Ann Saper - the Lady in Red
- The Dalton Girls (1957) - Rose Dalton
- Queen of Outer Space (1958) - Motiya
- Don't Give Up the Ship (1959) - Hilda (uncredited)
- One Hundred and One Dalmatians (1961) - Anita Radcliffe (voice)
- Star! (1968) - Fox Chorus Girl (uncredited)
