= Beryl Davis =

British-American jazz and big band singer (1924–2011)

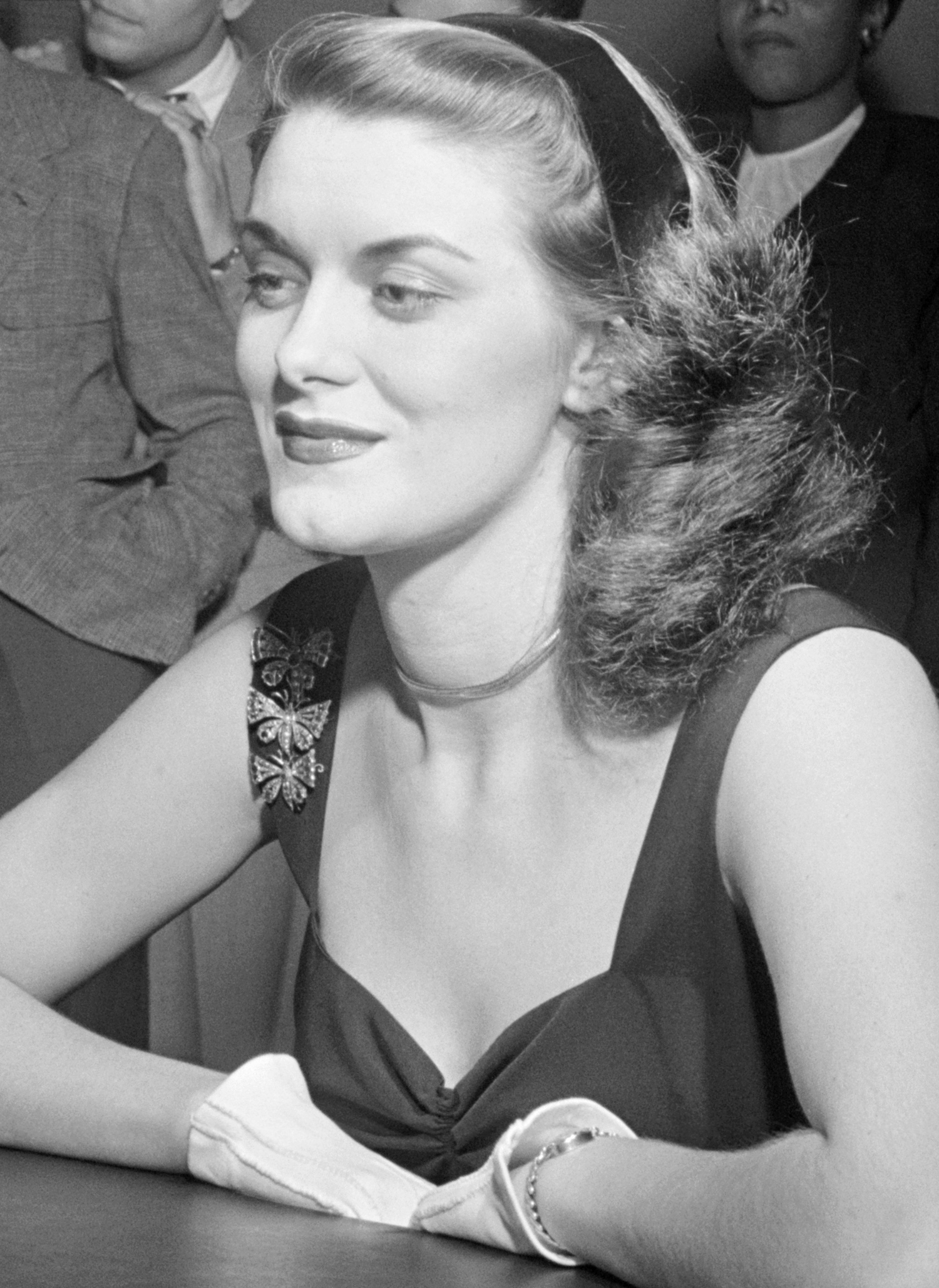
- Davis in a publicity photo by William P. Gottlieb, 8 October 1947

Background information
- Born: Beryl Eileen Mary Davis; 16 March 1924; Plymouth, England
- Died: 28 October 2011 (aged 87) Los Angeles, California, U.S.
- Genres: Vocal jazz, big band
- Occupation: Singer
- Years active: 1942–2007
- Label: Hindsight
- Formerly of: Oscar Rabin, Django Reinhardt, Glenn Miller, Tommy Dorsey, Frank Sinatra

Beryl Eileen Mary Davis (16 March 1924 – 28 October 2011) was a vocalist who sang with British and American big bands, as well as being an occasional featured vocalist at a very young age with the Quintette du Hot Club de France between 1936 and 1939. She was still performing in her 80s, into the 2000s, and was thought to be one of the last surviving and performing singers of the generation of popular entertainers from the 1930s and wartime years.

== Early life and family ==
Davis was born in Plymouth, England, to Harry Lomax Davis and Queenie Davis (née Ayres). Her father, a bandleader, was appearing at the local Palace Theatre. Her younger sister is Lisa Davis Waltz, a teen actress in the 1950s and 1960s and later, the voice of Anita in Disney's 101 Dalmatians.

== Career ==
Aged eight, Davis began to sing for the Oscar Rabin Band, co-led by her father and saxophonist Oscar Rabin, eventually turning professional and singing with, among others, Rabin, Geraldo, and the Skyrockets Dance Orchestra. From the age of 12, accompanied by a chaperone, she also performed and recorded with Django Reinhardt in Paris and on several European tours, and was the featured singer with the Quintette du Hot Club de France during their tour of the U.K. in July–August 1939, including a performance with the Quintette for BBC Television (broadcast in August 1939), of which, unfortunately, no copy appears to survive. She became popular singing for British and Allied troops during World War II, during which time Glenn Miller discovered her in London, and she sang for the Army Air Force Orchestra. After the war, she moved to Los Angeles with her father's big band, and appeared on Your Hit Parade with Frank Sinatra for a year.

She was part of the Four Girls singing group with Jane Russell, Rhonda Fleming, Della Russell, and Connie Haines. They recorded sixteen singles, and albums which became best sellers.

== Personal life and death ==
On October 24, 1948, Davis married William Mann Moore (aka Peter Potter), disc jockey and host of the 1950s Emmy winning television show, Jukebox Jury. They had three children, William Bell, Merry Bell, and Melinda Beryl. The marriage ended in divorce in 1965.

Davis was subsequently in a relationship with Glenn Miller drummer Buck Stapleton for 35 years. The couple created cruise ship package tours for more than 20 years; he died in 2003.

In 1996, a Golden Palm Star on the Palm Springs, California, Palm Springs Walk of Stars was dedicated to her. Still performing into her 80s, she was featured at several concerts and festivals in the mid-2000s with the backing of the guitarist John Jorgenson and his band, who featured her vocals on the track "Don't Worry 'Bout Me" on his 2007 CD Ultraspontane, reprising her original recording with Django Reinhardt from almost 70 years earlier.

On 28 October 2011, Davis died in Los Angeles from complications of Alzheimer's disease, at age 87.

== Discography ==
- Beryl By Candle-Light, (RCA Victor, 1948)
- Beryl Davis, (Zodiac Records, 1976)
- I'll Be Seeing You, (Hindsight, 1999)
- Alone Together, (2000)
- I Hear a Dream, (2001)
- Feel the Spirit, (Jasmine, 2008) - compilation of tracks released for Coral and Capitol in the 1950s
