= The Night Walker (film) =

1964 film by William Castle

- Theatrical release poster
- Directed by: William Castle
- Screenplay by: Robert Bloch
- Produced by: William Castle
- Starring: Robert Taylor; Barbara Stanwyck; Judith Meredith; Lloyd Bochner
- Cinematography: Harold E. Stine
- Edited by: Edwin H. Bryant
- Music by: Vic Mizzy
- Production company: William Castle Productions
- Distributed by: Universal Pictures
- Release date: December 30, 1964
- Running time: 86 minutes
- Country: United States
- Language: English

The Night Walker is a 1964 American psychological horror film directed and produced by William Castle, written by Robert Bloch, and starring Robert Taylor, Judith Meredith, Lloyd Bochner and Barbara Stanwyck in her final theatrical film role. It follows the wife of a wealthy inventor who is plagued by increasingly disturbing nightmares, which escalate after her husband's death. It was the final black and white film made by Universal Pictures.

== Plot ==
Irene Trent is unhappily married to a blind, pathologically possessive millionaire inventor, Howard. Howard and Irene's palatial mansion is packed with an assortment of cuckoo clocks, all in perfect synchronization, and Howard tape records all conversations in the house, hoping to catch Irene plotting an illicit liaison. Irene lives in a constant state of dread due to Howard's jealousy. Irene remains faithful to Howard, but not by choice; he never lets her leave the house and entertains no guests except his attorney, Barry Morland. Howard spends most of his time working in his upstairs laboratory on a variety of projects, the nature of which he refuses to divulge to anyone, while Irene indulges her yearnings for an extramarital affair with recurrent dreams of a fantasy lover.

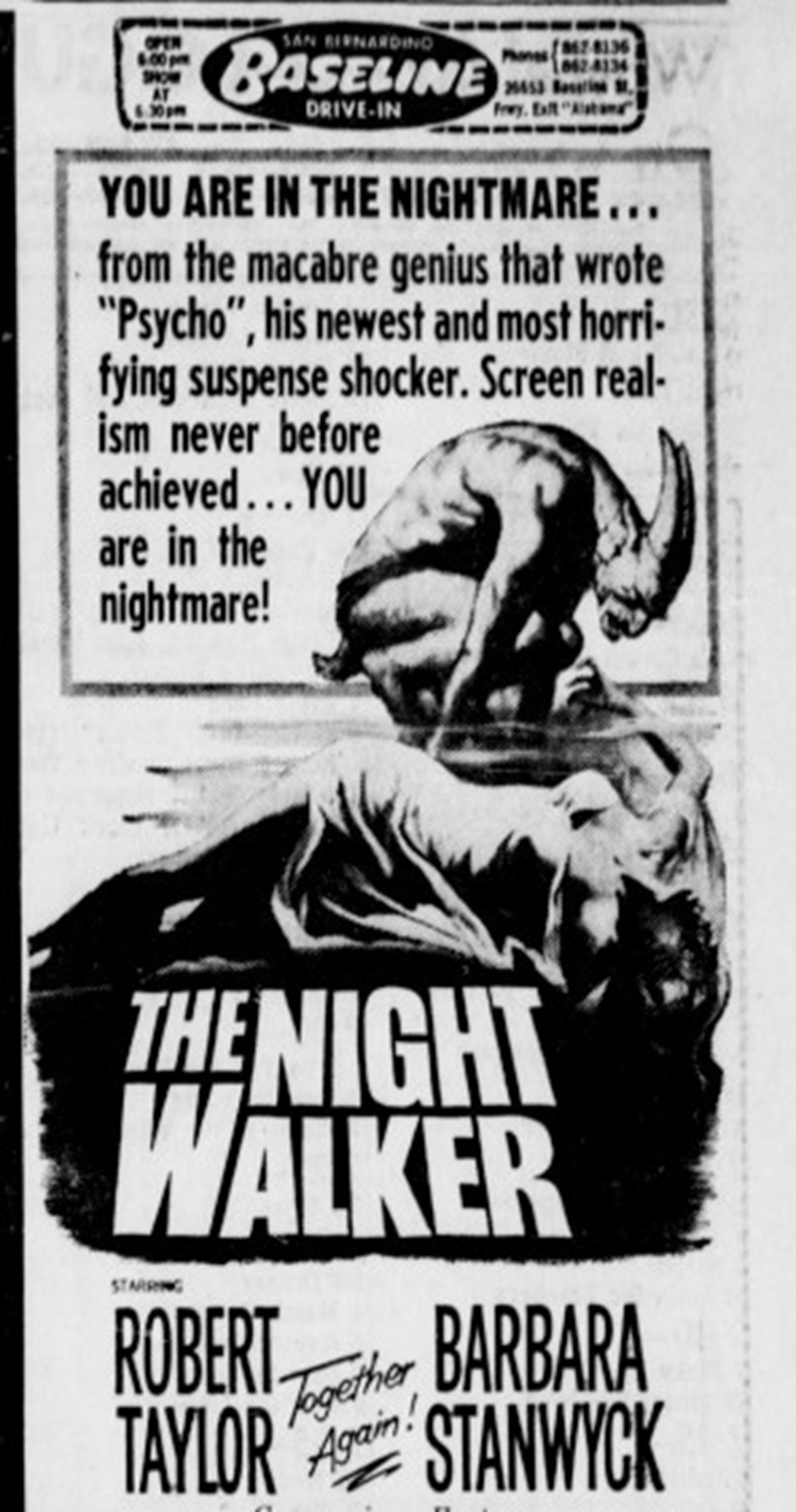
Drive-in advertisement from 1964

Howard is killed by an explosion in the laboratory, and Irene is set to inherit the house along with Howard's entire fortune upon completion of the probate process. The charred laboratory is secured by a padlock so that no one may enter it. Irene has a nightmare in which a disfigured Howard stalks her through the house. Convinced she must leave the site of Howard's death, Irene moves back into the back-room apartment of the beauty shop she owns, which she operated prior to marrying Howard. There, she finds a confidant in Joyce, a newly hired beautician.

Irene continues dreaming of her fantasy lover. During one instance, Irene and her fantasy lover are married in front of a group of wax figure witnesses. Irene recognizes the chapel as the same one in which she and Howard were married. Howard himself then enters and is remarried to her, while the fantasy lover disappears. When she awakens, Irene is convinced this latest encounter was not a dream, and visits the now-abandoned chapel with Barry. A groundskeeper allows them inside, and Irene finds the wedding ring from her dream lying on the floor. Irene's fantasy lover watches her and Barry depart the chapel. Barry at first insists that the incident was only a dream and that Irene is losing her sanity due to Howard's death, but abruptly changes his tune and says that a private detective named George Fuller, who Howard hired to stalk Irene, could be playing the part of the fantasy lover. Later, while visiting the empty Trent home alone, Barry hears Howard's voice.

When Irene returns to the beauty shop, Joyce relays an anonymous message from George: "Pleasant dreams." Joyce is stabbed to death in the salon by a man who resembles Howard. Barry arrives at the salon and claims to Irene that Howard also attacked him. Irene and Barry drive to the Trent estate. Barry enters the house while Irene tries to call the police from a pay phone, but the line has been cut.

Hearing gunshots, Irene rushes inside and, in the wrecked laboratory, is confronted by Barry, who shows her he has been impersonating Howard using a prosthetic mask. Barry admits to causing the explosion that killed Howard after writing his own name in as the primary beneficiary in Howard's will. Being blind, Howard did not know he was signing his fortune over to Barry, and Barry plotted to keep Irene from finding out by driving her mad with staged "dreams". George blackmailed Barry for half of Howard's estate, and so became a part of the scheme. Barry attempts to kill Irene, but is shot by George in vengeance for Joyce, who was George's wife. George explains that Barry was double-crossing him to cut him out of the deal. He tries to kill Irene, since she can be a witness to his crimes. Barry, having a sudden change of heart, fights to save Irene, and the two men fall to their deaths through a gaping hole in the laboratory floor. Looking down on their corpses, Irene breaks into insane laughter.

== Cast ==
- Robert Taylor as Barry Morland
- Barbara Stanwyck as Irene Trent
- Judi Meredith as Joyce
- Hayden Rorke as Howard Trent
- Rochelle Hudson as Hilda
- Marjorie Bennett as Manager
- Jess Barker as Malone
- Tetsu Komai as Gardener
- Lloyd Bochner as The Dream

== Production ==
Modestly budgeted, and shot entirely at Universal City, the film was a change of pace for Castle, who usually relied on gimmicks to sell his films, such as "Emergo" for House on Haunted Hill, or "Percepto" for The Tingler. This time, Castle relied on Bloch's reputation as the author of the novel on which Alfred Hitchcock's Psycho is based, as well as the re-teaming of Stanwyck and Taylor, who had been married from 1939 to 1951, as being sufficient to publicize the film.

Originally titled The Dream Killer, the role of Irene Trent was first offered to Joan Crawford (an old friend of Stanwyck) who declined as she was committed to appearing in Hush...Hush, Sweet Charlotte.

When asked if they had any objections to appearing in the film together (Robert Taylor had remarried after his divorce from Barbara Stanwyck), Taylor replied "It's all right with me if it's all right with her," and Stanwyck said "Of course not—but you'd better ask Mr. and Mrs. Taylor." When asked if it was all right with her, Taylor's current wife Ursula Thiess said only "not necessarily."

Despite all of Castle's efforts, and mixed but generally favorable reviews, the film was not a financial success. It marked the end of Castle's most influential period as a director, although he would go on to produce and direct a number of additional films for Universal, and later, Paramount Pictures. Stanwyck continued working on television until 1986 with her final television series The Colbys.

== Release ==
The Night Walker was released theatrically in Los Angeles on December 30, 1964. It opened the following month in New York City on January 20, 1965. The film continued to screen in the United States throughout July 1965. It marked star Stanwyck's final theatrical film role.

=== Marketing ===
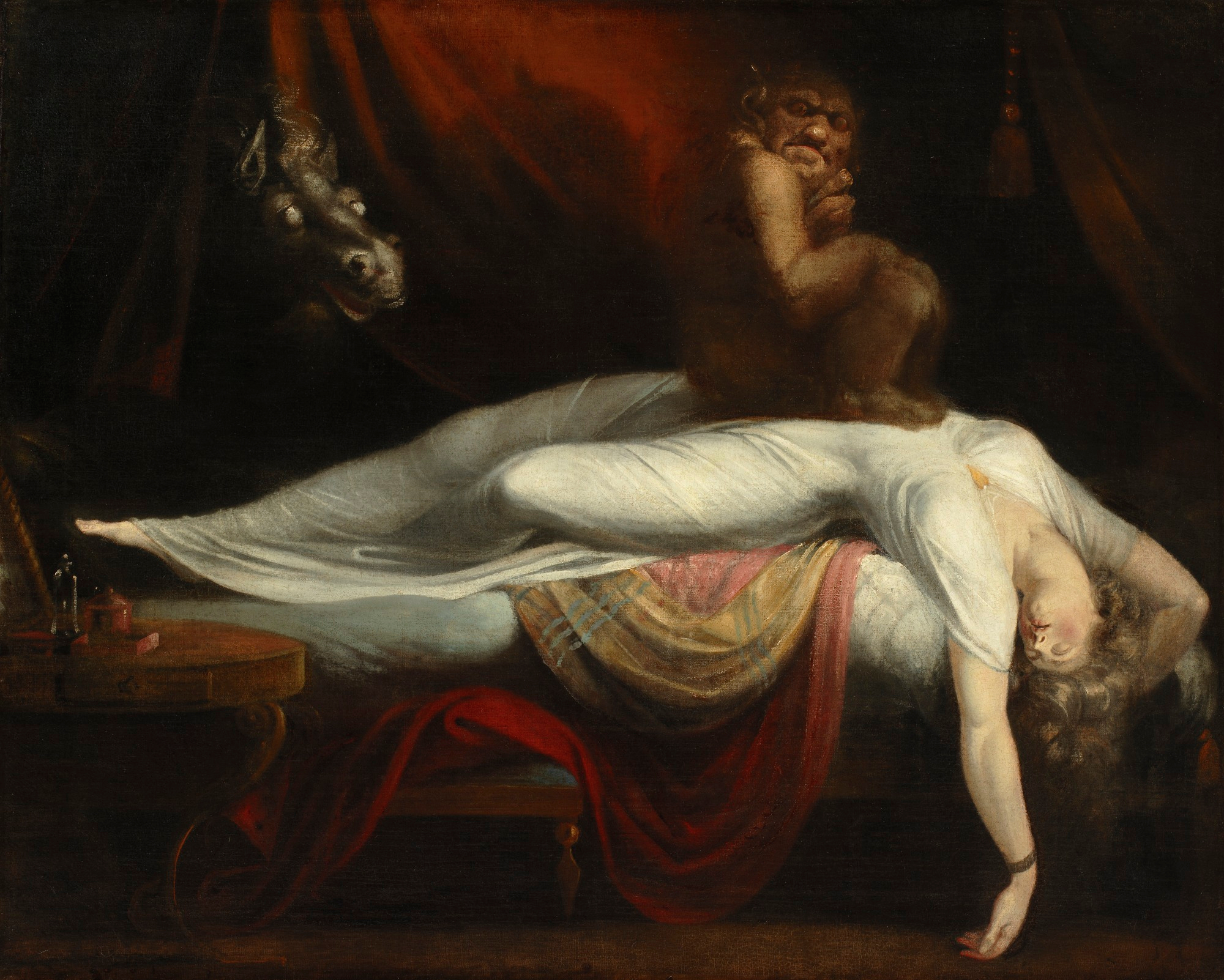
Fuseli's The Nightmare (1781) served as inspiration for the film's promotional artwork

Universal Pictures devised a sensationalistic advertising campaign for The Night Walker, with taglines reading: "Does sex dominate your dreams? Are you afraid of the things that can come out of your dreams ... Lust ... Murder ... Secret desires?" The key artwork featured on the majority of the film's promotional materials, showing a sleeping woman observed by a demonic incubus, is based on Henry Fuseli's The Nightmare (1781). Castle hired hypnotist Pat Collins to help design a five-minute promotional short for the film's release, in which Collins questioned six people on the content of their nightmares. The short film cost approximately $25,000. To further promote the film, a novelization was published in December 1964 by Award Books, adapted from Bloch's screenplay by Sidney Stuart.

Beginning on January 4, 1965, stars Stanwyck, Taylor, and Bochner embarked on a national promotional tour for the film, which included dates in New York City, Boston, Philadelphia, Detroit, Chicago, and multiple cities in Texas.

=== Critical response ===
A review published by Time magazine deemed the film a "lukewarm bloodbath, but it does afford veteran horrorist Barbara Stanwyck a chance to release her hysteria as of yore"; it also commented on the unexpected casting of Stanwyck and Robert Taylor, who had been married and divorced years prior. Bosley Crowther of The New York Times praised Stanwyck's performance, writing that she "lends an air of dignity to the otherwise unbelievable woman in this totally unbelievable tale." Variety commented on the convoluted plot, noting that it "attains its goal as a chiller, but the unfolding is so complicated that [the] audience is frequently lost. [The] film carries sufficient suspense and elements of shock."

Margaret Harford of the Los Angeles Times praised the film's cinematography and use of locations, adding that the film "builds up some good suspense and moves on to a surprise ending that surprises because the spook-work has carefully prepared us for something else."

In a retrospective review, Craig Butler of Allmovie lambasted the screenplay as being full of massive plot holes and stilted dialogue. He credited director William Castle and lead actors Barbara Stanwyck and Robert Taylor for their willingness to approach the poor material with earnestness and enthusiasm, but ultimately concluded that the only wholly enjoyable element of The Night Walker is the atmospheric soundtrack with its "surprisingly chilling" use of harpsichord.

=== Home media ===
The film was released in 1993 on VHS. It was later released on DVD by Universal Pictures and Turner Classic Movies as one of their "TCM Selects" titles on December 7, 2015, as part of a Double Feature with Dark Intruder from 1965. Shout! Factory released the film on Blu-ray on February 20, 2018, via their Scream Factory label. As of January 2022, the Blu-ray release had netted $81,839 in sales.

Has been shown on the MeTV show Svengoolie.

== Sources ==
- Higham, George (2020). Wax Museum Movies: A Comprehensive Filmography. Jefferson, North Carolina: McFarland. ISBN 978-1-476-66219-0.
- Leeder, Murray, ed. (2015). Cinematic Ghosts: Haunting and Spectrality from Silent Cinema to the Digital Era. New York City: Bloomsbury Publishing USA. ISBN 978-1-628-92214-1.
- Loukides, Paul; Fuller, Linda, eds. (1991). Beyond the Stars: Plot Conventions in American Popular Film. Vol. 2. Bowling Green, Ohio: Popular Press. ISBN 978-0-879-72517-4.
- Meehan, Paul (2014). Horror Noir: Where Cinema's Dark Sisters Meet. Jefferson, North Carolina: McFarland. ISBN 978-0-786-46219-3.
- Shelley, Peter (2009). Grande Dame Guignol Cinema: A History of Hag Horror from Baby Jane to Mother. Jefferson, North Carolina: McFarland. ISBN 978-0-786-45485-3.
