= Peter Potter (disc jockey) =

American disc jockey (1904 or 1905–1983)

Peter Potter (born William Mann Moore; 1904 or 1905 - April 17, 1983) was an American disc jockey who had programs on Los Angeles radio stations, was host of Juke Box Jury on ABC-TV, and won two Emmy Awards for the latter.. In 1953 he was considered the top-rated disc jockey in Los Angeles, and in 1954 he had the second-highest salary of any Hollywood celebrity.

== Early years ==
Potter was born William Mann Moore in Henryetta, Oklahoma, the son of Mr. and Mrs. C. B. Moore. As a student at the University of New Mexico, he was captain of the football team and a member of Kappa Sigma fraternity.

== Career ==
Potter went to Los Angeles to try to sell a radio serial that he had written. Peter Potter, the Henryetta Flash "was about a young guy who came to Hollywood to make good." Executives at KNX rejected his proposal but liked the way that he talked with "something of a drawl ... consciously careless about his grammar". He began selling used cars on radio, and he began using that character's name as his own.

=== Military ===
Potter was a west-coast producer for CBS before he entered the Army in 1942. As a private stationed at Fort Jackson, South Carolina, he had a 6:30 a.m. program on WCOS radio in Columbia. Twelfth Corps Reveille began with the sound of a bugle playing reveille as the broadcast "sped through the ether and out hundreds of speakers at Fort Jackson". Presented by the public relations office of the Twelfth Corps, the program mixed music with messages about each unit's role in the war and promoted purchases of war bonds and stamps six mornings each week.

=== Local radio and television ===
For more than 25 years Potter worked on radio stations in Los Angeles. In the late 1940s he had Platter Parade on KFWB. Other stations on which he worked included KLAC and KMPC. In addition to playing music, he interviewed celebrities on his programs. They included Ella Fitzgerald, Barbara Ruick, and Sarah Vaughan.

Beginning on May 15, 1950, Potter was host of the nightly Peter Potter's Party on KTSL television in Los Angeles. He returned to that station, which had changed its call letters to KNXT, with a program that debuted on August 23, 1952, at 11 p.m. Pacific Time. The disc-jockey format was similar to Potter's previous programs, but one characteristic made the new show "both unusual and significant". It had no specified time to end. Each open-ended broadcast would go "as long as there is any entertainment to offer and enough sponsors to pay for it".

=== Network TV ===
Potter was the host of Jukebox Jury on ABC television from September 13, 1953, until March 28, 1954. The show's name was also seen as Juke Box Jury, and it also became known as The Peter Potter Show. An adaptation of the program was shown in England as Jukebox Jury. The hour-long program featured a panel of celebrities review records before they were release.

In 1959 Potter appeared on The George Burns Show as the moderator of a panel of young people who were evaluating Burns's new record album.

=== Film ===
Potter estimated that he appeared in 38 films in limited roles that ranged from being an extra to speaking some lines in bit parts. Those films included Naughty Marietta and Curly Top.

== Personal life and death ==
In 1943 Potter married Alaine Charlotte Brandes, an actress later known as Rebel Randall, in Los Angeles. They were divorced in June 1944, remarried in September 1947, and divorced again. He married singer Beryl Davis on October 24, 1948, in Riverside, California. He had a son and two daughters. He lived in Palm Springs, California, in his later years and died of a heart attack on April 17, 1983, in Rancho Mirage, California, aged 78.
