= Termites of 1938 =

1938 American short film by Del Lord

- Directed by: Del Lord
- Written by: Elwood Ullman
- Produced by: Charley Chase; Hugh McCollum
- Starring: Moe Howard; Larry Fine; Curly Howard; Bess Flowers; Bud Jamison; Dorothy Granger; Etta McDaniel; John Ince; Symona Boniface
- Cinematography: André Barlatier - (French Wikipedia)
- Edited by: Art Seid
- Distributed by: Columbia Pictures
- Release date: January 7, 1938 (U.S.)
- Running time: 16:40
- Country: United States
- Language: English

Termites of 1938 is a 1938 short subject directed by Del Lord starring American slapstick comedy team The Three Stooges (Moe Howard, Larry Fine and Curly Howard). It is the 28th entry in the series released by Columbia Pictures starring the comedians, who released 190 shorts for the studio between 1934 and 1959.

== Plot ==
A high-society woman named Muriel has been looking forward to attending a dinner gathering hosted by an acquaintance. However, her spouse, Arthur, elects to embark on a fishing expedition, leaving her to contend with the prospect of attending the event unaccompanied. On the advice of a friend, Muriel instructs her maid to enlist the services of the Acme Escort Service to procure suitable companions, whom her friend assures her are "mostly college boys from Harvard and Yale – perfect gentlemen". Regrettably, a miscue results in a communication with the Acme Exterminator Co., overseen by the Stooges.

The Stooges, engrossed in the pursuit of innovative methods for rodent eradication, accept the commission, ignorant of its true nature. Clad in formal attire, they arrive at the opulent abode amidst a gathering of distinguished guests, laboring under the misconception that their role is to cleanse the premises of vermin. However, when the dinner is served, the Stooges rush with unseemly haste to partake in the banquet, and their atrocious table manners leave the assembled company nonplussed.

The post-prandial musical entertainment is disrupted by the Stooges, who dismiss the musicians and provide their own inept performance, culminating in the destruction of a double bass with a saw. When mice emerge from the broken instrument, chaos ensues. The Stooges undertake earnest efforts to fulfill their perceived duty, albeit with calamitous consequences, causing structural damage to the house and inadvertently injuring Muriel.

Upon Arthur's return, he confronts the chaotic scene and angrily chases the Stooges from the premises after seizing a gopher bomb from their equipment bag. As the Stooges attempt to flee in their automobile, Arthur lobs the bomb in their direction. He hits his target: the car is blown to pieces and the Stooges are left sprawling in the road.

== Cast ==
=== Credited ===
- Moe Howard as Moe
- Larry Fine as Larry
- Curly Howard as Curly

=== Uncredited ===
- Bess Flowers as Muriel Van Twitchell
- Etta McDaniel as Mandy - The Maid
- Bud Jamison as Lord Wafflebottom
- John Ince as Clayhammer
- Edward Peil Sr. as 2nd Butler
- Jules Cowles as 3rd Butler
- Dorothy Granger as Mabel Sturgeon
- Symona Boniface as Party Guest
- Carlton Griffin as Party Guest
- Delos Jewkes as Party Guest
- Kay Valon as Tall Blonde Guest
- Lew Davis as Party Guest
- Helen Davis as Party Guest
- Beatrice Blinn as Party Guest
- Helen Godwin as Party Guest

Note: IMDB lists Richard Fiske as Arthur Van Twitchell, but it is not Fiske; the role is played by an unidentified actor.

== Production notes ==
Termites of 1938 was filmed on October 19–23, 1937. The film's title is a parody of the film title Gold Diggers of 1937. The film has two musical quirks unusual for Stooge shorts. First, the Three Stooges' opening theme, "Listen to the Mockingbird," is played again when the Stooges first appear onscreen. Second, music derived from Victor Schertzinger's score for the 1933 Columbia feature Cocktail Hour is featured during the dinner scene. This is the result of producer Charley Chase, who liked incidental music from his time at the Hal Roach studio.

Termites of 1938 was remade in 1946 as Society Mugs, starring future Stooge Shemp Howard and Tom Kennedy.
