= Patrick Waltz =

American film and television actor

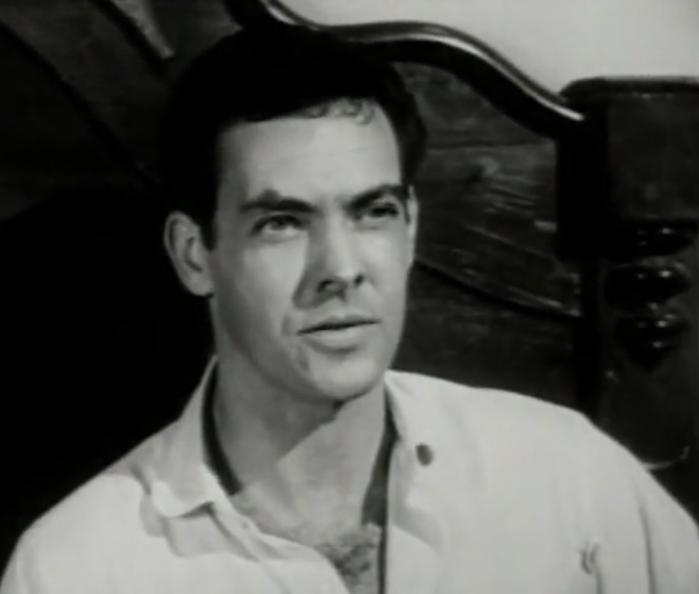
- Waltz in Bat Masterson, 1958
- Born: Jack Richard Waltz; December 6, 1924; Akron, Ohio, U.S.
- Died: August 13, 1972 (aged 47); Burbank, California, U.S.
- Occupation(s): Film and television actor
- Years active: 1950–1971
- Spouses: Phyllis Dolores Showalter (1941–1954; divorced); Lisa Davis (m. 1958; div. 1971)
- Children: 3

Jack Richard Waltz (December 6, 1924 – August 13, 1972) was an American film and television actor.

Waltz was born in Akron, Ohio, the younger of two sons born to Frank and Lucy Leona (nee Dugan) Waltz. Waltz attended Coventry High School. He began his career in 1950, starring in the film The Sun Sets at Dawn, credited as Philip Shawn. He then appeared in Flight Nurse (1953). He also appeared in the 1954 film It Should Happen To You, and in the same year played Detective Strauss in The Human Jungle.

Other film appearances included Until They Sail (1957), Queen of Outer Space (1958), It Happened at the World's Fair (1963), Good Neighbor Sam (1964), The Silencers (1966), and The Devil's Brigade (1968). He guest-starred in television programs including 77 Sunset Strip, McHale's Navy, Bat Masterson, Tombstone Territory, 26 Men, Death Valley Days, The Twilight Zone and The Mod Squad.

== Personal life and death ==
Waltz married Phyllis Dolores Showalter on September 27, 1941 by the deputy clerk in the office of Summit County, Ohio Probate Judge Dean Fay. Waltz was 16 years old and it was Showalter's 18th birthday but both are listed as being 17 years old. His age is incorrectly recorded as "17 years of age on the 6 day of December 1940". The license was taken out on September 23, 1941. The daughter of Earl W. and Bertie (Calvert) Showalter, her parents are listed as giving their consent for their still minor age (17) daughter on the license application. The union was apparently childless and ended in divorce on September 22, 1954. He married, secondly, to co-star Lisa Davis (from Queen of Outer Space), on June 28, 1958. The couple had three children. The marriage ended in divorce in January 1971, a year before Waltz's death.

Waltz died on August 13, 1972 at Providence Saint Joseph Medical Center in Burbank, California, at the age of 47.
