= Rebel Randall =

American actress (1922–2010)

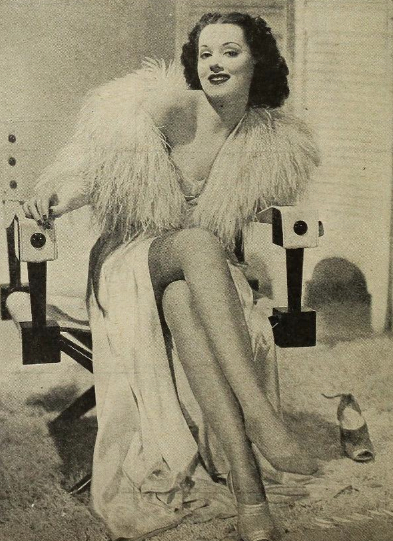
- Randall in 1940
- Born: Alaine Charlotte Dorothy Brandes; January 22, 1922; Chicago, Illinois
- Died: July 22, 2010 (aged 88); Indio, California
- Resting place: Desert Memorial Park, Cathedral City, California
- Years active: 1940–1956
- Spouse(s): William Mann Moore (aka Peter Potter) (1946 – 9 October 1947) (May 1943 – April 1944); Glenn Thompson (21 September 1953 – December 1953)

Rebel Randall (born Alaine Charlotte Dorothy Brandes, January 22, 1922 – July 22, 2010), was an American film actress and radio personality. She appeared in approximately 50 films between 1940 and 1956.

== Early years ==
Randall was born and raised in Chicago, Illinois, and graduated from Foreman High School. She was a model during her mid-teen years, becoming identified with some of the products for which she modeled. While she was in high school she was "the Coca-Coal Girl, the Ford Girl, the Sunkist Orange Girl, the Wrigley Girl, and the Jantzen Bathing Suit Girl". After one of enrollment at Northwestern University, she learned that she had received a scholarship to the Max Reinhardt Workshop in Hollywood.

== Career ==
According to an interview with Mike Barnum in the December 2009 issue of "Classic Images", after winning the scholarship to the Reinhardt Workshop she appeared as Queen Titania in a version of A Midsummer Night's Dream.

Randall was chosen from a group of 20 contestants as the Motion Picture Still Photographers' Glamour Girl of 1940. As the winner she had a screen test with Warner Bros.

Her name was changed after she obtained a contract with Paramount Pictures. The studio initially billed her as Alaine Brandes, but that name "resulted in more than a normal share of misspellings". A two-page list contained possible new names for her, but none seemed suitable. She finally suggested "Rebel" as the first name because of her family ties in Georgia and Virgnina. She ran her finger down a telephone book page and selected "Randall" as her last name.

During World War II Randall made personal appearances at military installations in addition to participating in shows for Army and Navy personnel. She was a popular G.I. pin-up girl during her time as a John Robert Powers model in the 1940s and posed for magazines like Esquire. She did a stint as "The Coca-Cola Girl" in advertisements and was a disc jockey for the Armed Forces Radio Service (AFRS) and hosted a show called Radio Calling. She had another program, Juke Box, U.S.A. on AFRS. Her work on commercial radio included an early stint with WDSU in New Orleans. In the early 1950s she was mistress of ceremonies on America Calling. The program included her phone calls to military personnel around the world, requested records, and guest personalities.

Randall starred in several dozen cinematic appearances from the early 1940s thru the mid 1950s. After making a name for herself doing radio commercials, she moved to Hollywood where she made her 1940 debut in "Turnabout". Working as a Paramount contract player, she was seen in many of the company's films, among them 1941's "The Lone Rider in Ghost Town", "In Old Oklahoma" (1943), "The Powers Girl" (1943), the 1945 "Booby Dupes", and 1945's "The Shadow Returns". In 1949, she was named "The Most Beautiful Girl on TV". In the 1950s, Randall discovered that a New Orleans stripper began using her name and she had to legally stop her.

== Personal life ==
In 1943, Randall married Peter Potter, a disc jockey in Los Angeles; they divorced in June 1944, were remarried in September 1947, and ultimately divorced a second time a month later. On September 22, 1953, Rebel married wealthy actor and businessman Glenn Thompson in Las Vegas. That marriage was annulled on December 8, 1953.

Randall lived the rest of her days in Southern California and died on July 22, 2010, after spending her final years in a nursing facility.

=== Politics ===
Although some sources list Randall as a Republican, she was an active Democrat for decades. In 1972 she ran for Congress in California's 43rd District against Ernest Z. Robles in Imperial County in 1972. She later founded Women's United International, which supported Jimmy Carter in his campaigns. Their correspondence is preserved at his Presidential Library.

== Selected filmography ==
- Hold That Woman (1940)
- Turnabout (1940)
- The Boys From Syracuse (1940)
- Louisiana Purchase [as Alaine Brandes] (1941)
- The Lone Rider in Ghost Town (1941)
- The Fired Man [as Alaine Brandes] (1941)
- Ziegfeld Girl (film) (1941)
- Pacific Blackout (1941)
- Arabian Nights (1942 film) (1942)
- Fall In (1942)
- Sin Town (1942)
- Holiday Inn (film) (1942)
- About Face (1942)
- The Fleet's In (1942)
- In Old Oklahoma (1943)
- Hi'ya Sailor (1943)
- Happy Go Lucky (1943)
- The Powers Girl (1943)
- Fired Wife (1943)
- Gals, Incorporated (1943)
- Hit the Ice (film) (1943)
- Good Morning, Judge (1943)
- Hi Buddy (1943)
- It Comes Up Love (1943)
- The Suspect (1944)
- She Snoops to Conquer (1944)
- Dead or Alive (1944)
- Atlantic City (1944)
- Seven Doors to Death (1944)
- Booby Dupes (1945)
- Adventure (1945)
- A Thousand and One Nights (1945)
- Where the Pest Begins (1945)
- Here Come the Co-Eds (1945)
- Because of Him (1946)
- Society Mugs (1946)
- Hot Water (1946)
- The Shadow Returns (1946)
- Night and Day (1946)
- The Stranger (1946)
- Her Kind of Man (1946)
- The Shadow Returns (1946)
- That's My Gal (1947)
- The Homestretch (1947)
- The Bride Goes Wild (1948)
- Roaring City (1951)
- Fun on the Run (1951)
- Come on Seven (1956)
