= Queen of Outer Space =

1958 film by Edward Bernds

- Theatrical release poster
- Directed by: Edward Bernds
- Screenplay by: Charles Beaumont
- Story by: Ben Hecht
- Produced by: Ben Schwalb
- Starring: Zsa Zsa Gabor; Laurie Mitchell; Eric Fleming; Lisa Davis
- Cinematography: William P. Whitley
- Edited by: William Austin
- Music by: Marlin Skiles
- Color process: DeLuxe
- Distributed by: Allied Artists Pictures
- Release date: August 27, 1958
- Running time: 80 minutes
- Country: United States
- Language: English

Queen of Outer Space is a 1958 American science fiction film shot in DeLuxe Color and CinemaScope. Produced by Ben Schwalb and directed by Edward Bernds, it stars Zsa Zsa Gabor, with Eric Fleming, Laurie Mitchell and Lisa Davis in featured roles. The screenplay by Charles Beaumont, about a revolt against a cruel Venusian queen, is based on an idea supplied by Ben Hecht and originally titled Queen of the Universe. Upon its release, the film was promoted by Allied Artists and distributed to some locations as a double feature with Frankenstein 1970 starring Boris Karloff.

== Plot ==
In the year 1985, Captain Neal Patterson and his spaceship crew, Lt. Mike Cruze and Lt. Larry Turner, are assigned to escort Professor Konrad to an Earth space station.

While en route, the space station is destroyed by a mysterious interstellar energy beam, which also damages their rocketship, and causes it to crash land on a planet that Konrad reveals to his shocked companions as Venus. The four men are later captured by an army of aggressive, beautiful women with ray guns. The men are brought before the governing council where they learn the planet is under the dictatorship of the cruel Queen Yllana, a masked woman who has had most men killed, keeping only male mathematicians and scientists on a prison colony moon orbiting Venus.

In a detainment area in the queen's palace, Konrad tells the men that he believes that the beam not only destroyed the space station and caused their rocket ship to crash on Venus but it may have originated from Venus. They are later aided by a beautiful courtier named Talleah and her Venusian friends Motiya and Kaeel. The women long for the love and attention of men again and plot to overthrow the evil queen to reestablish the "old order".

The masked queen later has her guards bring Patterson to her bedchamber, where she seduces him. Patterson forcibly removes her mask, revealing a horribly disfigured face received during a war between Venus and the men of another planet "10 Earth years” earlier. Later, in a fury, the queen decides she must destroy Earth in order to protect her world and preserve her power. In the presence of Yllana’s armed guards, Talleah and the crewmen can only watch as the queen aims the energy-beam "disintegrator" at Earth. Just after Yllana activates the weapon, Talleah's allies spring from hiding and a melee begins. Sabotaged by the rebels, the disintegrator immediately begins to malfunction and finally explodes, killing Queen Yllana.

Talleah becomes the new leader of Venus, and turns her romantic intentions towards Patterson. At a subsequent ceremony, she announces that Patterson's rocketship has been repaired and that he and his crew can return to Earth. Talleah's technicians have also repaired the "electronic televiewer", which contacts Space Command on Earth. Patterson is ordered not to attempt a return, and to remain on Venus for at least a year until a relief expedition from Earth can arrive.

The crew are elated to follow orders, and celebrate in a flurry of hugs and passionate kisses with the Venusians.

== Cast ==
- Zsa Zsa Gabor as Talleah
- Eric Fleming as Captain Neal Patterson
- Dave Willock as Lt. Mike Cruze
- Laurie Mitchell as Queen Yllana
- Lisa Davis as Motiya
- Paul Birch as Professor Konrad
- Patrick Waltz as Lt. Larry Turner
- Barbara Darrow as Kaeel
- Marilyn Buferd as Odeena
- Mary Ford as Venusian
- Marya Stevens as Venusian
- Laura Mason as Venusian
- Lynn Cartwright as Venusian
- Kathy Marlowe as Venusian
- Coleen Drake as Venusian

== Production ==
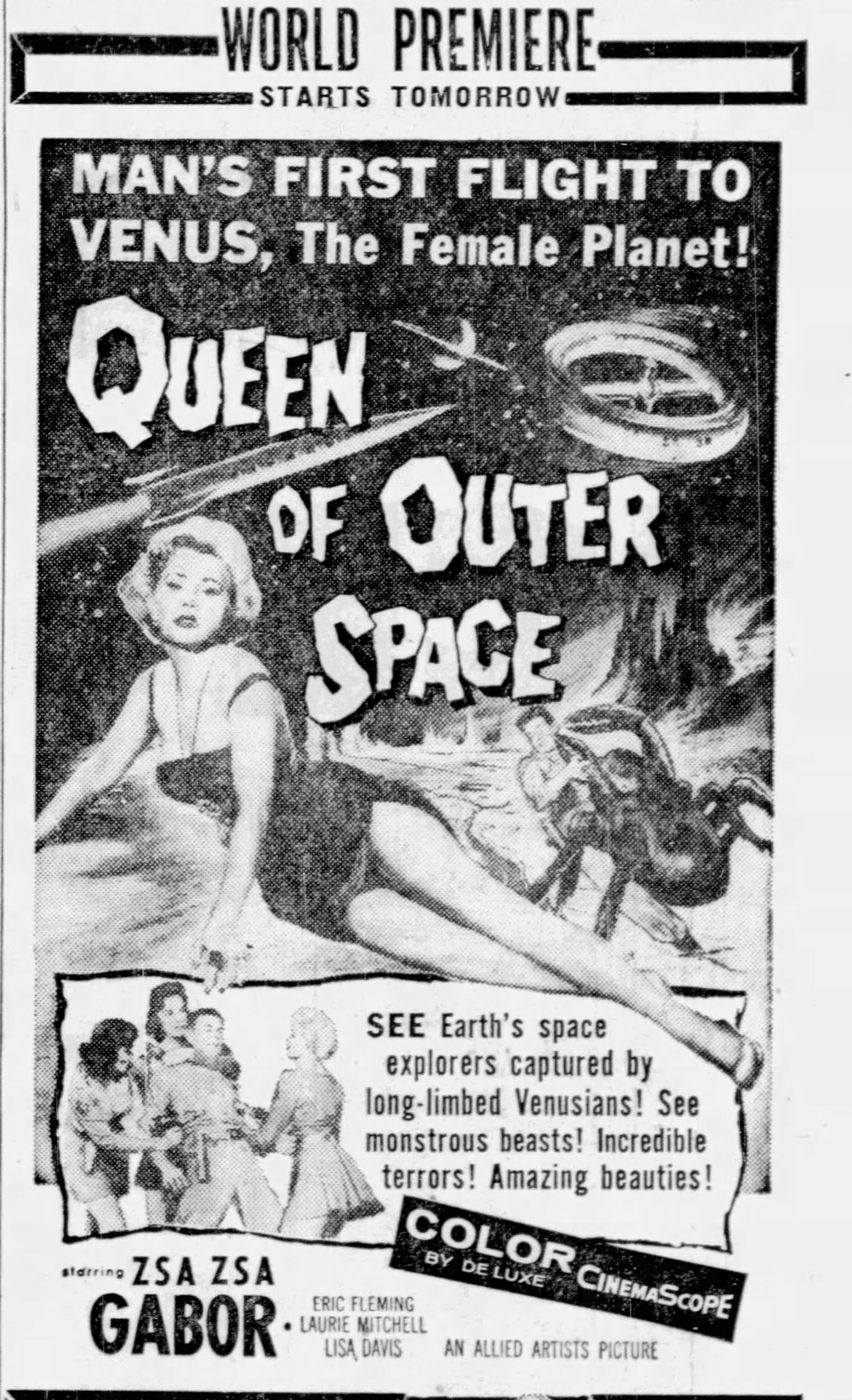
Theatrical advertisement from 1958

The Three Stooges and the Bowery Boys director Edward Bernds recalled that, after producer Walter Wanger was released from prison for shooting agent Jennings Lang in the groin for having an affair with his wife Joan Bennett, Wanger could only find work at the low-rent Allied Artists (formerly Monogram Pictures). In 1952, Wanger brought a ten-page idea for a screenplay by Ben Hecht called Queen of the Universe that was a satirical look at a planet run by women. Several years later, with the idea of science fiction films being more common, Allied Artists revived the project with Wanger replaced on the film by Ben Schwalb, who was then producing the Bowery Boys films. Screenwriter Charles Beaumont did not think there was much in the Hecht screenplay, but Schwalb suggested spoofing the idea and had former Three Stooges screenwriter Ellwood Ullman touch up Beaumont's screenplay. Allied Artists retitled the film Queen of Outer Space as they thought the original title sounded more like a beauty pageant.

The central plot of a planet ruled by women was recycled from other science fiction features of the era, including Abbott and Costello Go to Mars (1953), Cat-Women of the Moon (1953), and Britain's Fire Maidens from Outer Space (1955). Queen of Outer Space also recycled many props, costumes, and other elements used in earlier films of the 1950s, most prominently the C-57D crewmen's uniforms, rayguns, and Altaira's wardrobe from Forbidden Planet (1956); models, sets, and special effects from Bernds' World Without End (1956); stock footage of an Atlas missile taking off; and a model rocketship built for Flight to Mars (1951). The model was also used by the Bowery Boys in Paris Playboys (1954), which was co-written by Bernds and Ullman. It is noteworthy, too, that the queen's guards wore uniforms that foreshadow (and may have even influenced) those worn on the later Star Trek television series, coming in the same three Starfleet colors; red, blue, and gold.

In her 1991 autobiography One Lifetime is Not Enough, Gabor recounts a memorable line of her dialogue in the film and cites the production costs for creating the highly tailored fashions worn by her character:

I made Queen of Outer Space, which was destined to become a classic. Written by Ben Hecht (of Front Page fame), Queen was one of the last films he wrote....I play [Talleah], a scientist who is against all of Queen [Yllana's] cruelties and wants to see her banished. The highpoint comes when I declare, "I hate that queen", a line that even to this day causes a great deal of mirth among many of my gay friends. I liked Ben Hecht and adored my costumes, designed by Edith Head and costing a staggering $15,000 apiece.

Curvaceous Joi Lansing appears uncredited in a flashy but brief role the as Turner character's girlfriend.

== Reception ==
In 1958, the film received generally positive reviews from critics in major newspapers and in trade publications. Most reviewers, including Charles Stinson of the Los Angeles Times, approached the film in their assessments as an amusing, mildly erotic parody or spoof, not as a true science-fiction offering or even a faintly-serious space adventure. In his November 13 review, Stinson characterizes the feature as "cheery frivolity" with "well-constructed cheesecake", all of which is visually punctuated by "luscious DeLuxe color". He even compliments Gabor's performance:

Fortunately, Allied Artists' "Queen of Outer Space"...is not science fiction. Because if it were, it would be horrid. However...it is an elaborate parody of science fiction and, as such, it is quite good, indeed....Naturally, the one and only Zsa Zsa Gabor is the principal attraction. She comes through superbly, demonstrating a nice touch for light, dotty comedy, as, with hair gone moon-platinum, she floats about gauzily, tongue in cheek, flirting outrageously, satirizing herself and sighing deeply over the fact "zat de qveen vil destroy ze planet Earss unless ve stop her, Capt. Patterson." Zsa Zsa saves, of course.

Marjory Adams, writing for The Boston Globe, also recognized the Gabor vehicle as a "merry spoof of science fiction" that no one either on the screen or in theater audiences takes seriously, especially with regard to the actors' lines. "The dialogue", notes Adams, "is of the sort which might be written by a high school freshman", adding "the only unexpected twist is [Zsa Zsa] isn't the queen".

Variety, for decades a leading trade publication in covering the United States' entertainment industry, simply deemed Queen of Outer Space as "a good-natured attempt to put some honest sex into science-fiction."

In Canada in 1958, Mike Helleur, a reviewer for Toronto's The Globe and Mail, compares the film's portrayal of life on Venus to "living backstage at the Folies Bergère", complete with light entertainment and rather scantily clad young women, who in this case take a "slapstick romp" through a Venusian queen's palace. One of several oddities that Helleur notices in the film is Gabor's singular identity among all the planet's inhabitants met by the Earthlings: "She is...the only girl in Outer Space with a Hungarian accent."

As of 2019, Rotten Tomatoes gives the film an approval rating of 18% based on reviews from 11 critics.

=== "Morally objectionable" ===
The trade publication Motion Picture Daily reported in 1958 that the National Legion of Decency objected to the content of Queen of Outer Space. In its October 3 issue, less than a month after the film's release, the magazine provides a few examples of the Legion's classification system for judging a Hollywood production's level of "decency":

Two pictures were placed in Class B, as morally objectionable in part for all by the Legion of Decency, which reviewed seven films this week. In the B category are "Man of the West" and "Queen of Outer Space." Objection to the first was explained thusly, "the highly moral nature of this story is substantially marred by excessive brutality and unnecessary suggestiveness." Of "Queen," the group said it contains "suggestive costuming."
