= Larry Keating =

American actor (1899–1963)

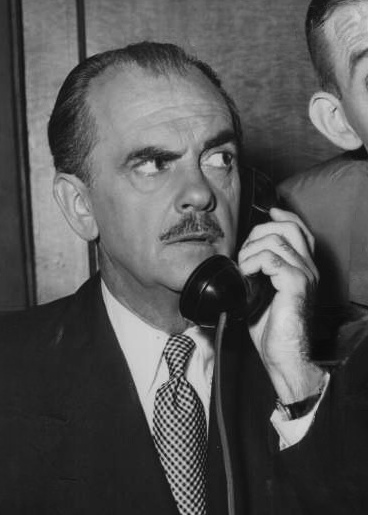
- Keating in The Hank McCune Show (1950)
- Born: Lawrence Keating; June 13, 1899; St. Paul, Minnesota, U.S.
- Died: August 26, 1963 (aged 64); Hollywood, Los Angeles, California, U.S.
- Resting place: Mount Calvary Cemetery
- Occupation: Actor
- Years active: 1945–1963
- Spouse: Ruth Keating
- Children: 2

Lawrence Keating (June 13, 1899 – August 26, 1963) was an American actor best known for his roles as Harry Morton on The George Burns and Gracie Allen Show, which he played from 1953 to 1958, and next-door neighbor Roger Addison on Mister Ed, which he played from 1961 until his death in 1963.

== Early years ==
Keating was born in St. Paul, Minnesota.

== Career ==
On April 6, 1937, Keating created Professor Puzzlewit, a quiz program on KMJ radio in Fresno, California, and Blue Network west coast network. He also was the program's quizmaster.

Keating was an announcer for NBC in the 1940s, an announcer for ABC radio's This Is Your FBI from 1945 to 1953, and a regular on the short-lived series The Hank McCune Show. Keating was the longest of several actors to play neighbor Harry Morton on The George Burns and Gracie Allen Show. Keating took over the role of Harry Morton from Fred Clark in 1953 and continued in this role on the short-lived sequel, The George Burns Show.

During his first episode on The Burns and Allen Show, George Burns stopped the action just before Harry's entrance and explained that Clark had left the show. Then, he introduced Larry Keating to Bea Benaderet, who played Blanche Morton, saying, "This is Larry Keating and he is going to be your husband now". The pair greeted and complimented each other on their previous work. George remarked that if they were going to be so nice to each other, no one would believe they were married.

Keating played Roger Addison, the next-door neighbor (of Wilbur Post's, who was played by Alan Young) on the television series Mister Ed from 1961 until his death in 1963.

Keating's film credits include The Mating Season (1951), When Worlds Collide (1951), Monkey Business (1952), and Inferno (1953).

== Death ==
Keating was diagnosed with leukemia in February 1963 while Season 3 of Mister Ed was in production. Despite his illness, Keating returned to the series when filming began for the fourth season that summer. He filmed four episodes for Season 4 and worked up to the week before his death on August 26, 1963. His final film, The Incredible Mr. Limpet, was released posthumously in March 1964. He is entombed in Portland, Oregon's Mount Calvary Cemetery.

== Complete filmography ==
- Song of the Sarong (1945) as Larry Keating a.k.a. Potter
- Whirlpool (1949) as Mr. Simms (uncredited)
- Dancing in the Dark (1949) as Board Member (uncredited)
- When Willie Comes Marching Home (1950) as Gen. G. "Larry" Reeding (uncredited)
- Mother Didn't Tell Me (1950) as Doctor Tracy (uncredited)
- Ma and Pa Kettle Go to Town (1950) as Police Lt. Klein (uncredited)
- I Was a Shoplifter (1950) as Harry Dunson
- Stella (1950) as Gil Wright (uncredited)
- Three Secrets (1950) as Mark Harrison
- My Blue Heaven (1950) as Doctor (uncredited)
- Mister 880 (1950) as James F. Lee - Skipper's Attorney (uncredited)
- Right Cross (1950) as Second Reporter
- The Mating Season (1951) as Mr. Kalinger, Sr.
- Follow the Sun (1951) as Sportswriter Jay Dexter
- Bright Victory (1951) as Jess Coe
- Francis Goes to the Races (1951) as Head Steward
- When Worlds Collide (1951) as Dr. Cole Hendron
- Bannerline (1951) as Stambaugh
- Come Fill the Cup (1951) as Julian Cuscaden
- Too Young to Kiss (1951) as Danny Cutler
- The Light Touch (1951) as Mr. R.F. Hawkley
- About Face (1952) as Col. Long
- Glory Alley (1952) as Philip Louis Bennson (uncredited)
- Carson City (1952) as William Sharon
- Monkey Business (1952) as G.J. Culverly
- Something for the Birds (1952) as Roy Patterson
- Above and Beyond (1952) as Maj. Gen. Vernon C. Brent
- She's Back on Broadway (1953) as Mitchell Parks
- Inferno (1953) as Dave Emory
- A Lion Is in the Streets (1953) as Robert L. Castleberry IV
- Give a Girl a Break (1953) as Felix Jordan
- Gypsy Colt (1954) as Wade Y. Gerald
- Daddy Long Legs (1955) as Ambassador Alexander Williamson
- The Eddy Duchin Story (1956) as Leo Reisman
- The Best Things in Life Are Free (1956) as Winfield Sheehan
- The Wayward Bus (1957) as Elliott Pritchard
- The Buster Keaton Story (1957) as Larry Winters
- Stopover Tokyo (1957) as High Commissioner
- Who Was That Lady? (1960) as Parker
- Mister Ed (1961) as Rodger Addison
- Boys' Night Out (1962) as Mr. Bingham
- The Incredible Mr. Limpet (1964) as Admiral P.P. Spewter (released posthumously)
