= Harry Von Zell =

American actor, singer, announcer (1906–1981)

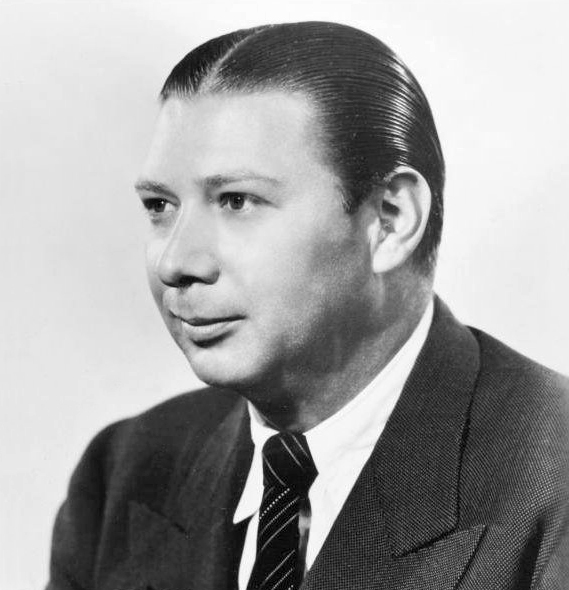
- Von Zell in 1940
- Born: Harry Rudolph Von Zell; July 11, 1906; Indianapolis, Indiana, U.S.
- Died: November 21, 1981 (aged 75); Woodland Hills, California, U.S.
- Education: University of California, Los Angeles
- Occupations: Radio announcer, film and television actor
- Years active: 1929–1975
- Spouse: Minerva McGarvey (m. 1925)
- Children: 2

Harry Rudolph Von Zell (July 11, 1906 – November 21, 1981) was an American announcer of radio programs, and an actor in films and television shows. He is best remembered for his work on The George Burns and Gracie Allen Show.

== Life and career ==
=== Early years ===
Harry Von Zell was born July 11, 1906, in Indianapolis, Indiana, the elder child of Iva Clara (née Gohn) and Harry Adolph von Zell. Von Zell's father was a sports reporter for the Indianapolis Star. The family moved to Sioux City, Iowa, where von Zell graduated from high school. Later, the family moved to California, where he studied music and drama at the University of California, Los Angeles, and worked at a variety of jobs. After friends tricked him into singing on a radio program, he began receiving offers from radio stations, and his career in that medium began.

=== Announcing ===
Von Zell broke into show business as a singer and announcer at radio station KMIC in Inglewood, California, in the mid-1920s. In late 1926, Von Zell sang on the "Times de Luxe Program" on KHJ in Los Angeles, and was eventually employed as the manager of KMTR Los Angeles, moving to KGB San Diego in January 1929. Auditioning for Paul Whiteman's radio show later that year, he was chosen from a field of 250 announcers. When that series came to an end in 1930, he headed for New York and became a CBS staff announcer, working with Fred Allen, Phil Baker, Eddy Duchin and Ed Wynn. He also announced The Aldrich Family, The Amazing Mr. Smith, and The March of Time. During the 1920s and 1930s, Von Zell served as announcer on some 20 shows a week.

His longest-running radio partnership was his nine seasons with veteran comedian Eddie Cantor. From October 1940 to June 1949, Von Zell served as Cantor's commercial spokesperson and straight man. Then, as Cantor cast member Dinah Shore's solo career began to blossom, she brought Von Zell in as announcer on her Birds Eye Open House program.

As a young announcer, Von Zell made a memorable verbal slip in 1931 when he referred to then U.S. President Herbert Hoover as "Hoobert Heever" during a live tribute on Hoover's birthday. Hoover was not present at this tribute. Von Zell's blooper came at the end of a lengthy summation of Hoover's career, during which Von Zell had pronounced the president's name correctly several times. Some mistakenly believe Hoover was present when the incident occurred, because of a re-enactment fabricated by Kermit Schafer for his Pardon My Blooper record album, a number of years later.

=== Music ===
Von Zell was the vocalist for the first recording session of Charlie Barnet's musical career. A session on October 9, 1933, had Von Zell singing, "I Want You, I Need You" (which was remade on October 25, 1933), as well as "What Is Sweeter (Than the Sweetness of 'I Love You')?".

In 1941, Von Zell sang on NBC's popular "jam session" program The Chamber Music Society of Lower Basin Street. He and three other staff announcers became an impromptu barbershop quartet, with von Zell offering commentary in a florid, Victorian style.

=== Radio comedy ===
As an actor, Von Zell appeared on The Joan Davis Show as the love interest of the character played by Verna Felton. When he entered a room, Felton would often shout excitedly, "Why, Mr. Von Zellllllllllll!" After this, Von Zell headlined his short-lived radio program, The Smiths of Hollywood, which featured Arthur Treacher and Jan Ford (who would later become Howard Hughes' paramour under the name Terry Moore).

=== Film ===
Harry Von Zell's film debut came in 1943, when he provided tongue-in-cheek offscreen narration for four entries in RKO's Flicker Flashbacks series of silent-film satires. His face was first seen on screen in feature films of 1945. His movies included The Saxon Charm, Dear Wife, Son of Paleface, Two Flags West, and For Heaven's Sake.

He also starred in a series of eight slapstick comedy shorts for Columbia Pictures (1946–50). The exposure he received from the Columbia comedies led to his being hired by Burns and Allen for their television programs.

=== Television ===
Von Zell worked in the earliest days of television in 1931, describing boxing matches on experimental television boxing broadcasts. Nearly 20 years later, in early 1950, he had his first major television exposure as announcer and spokesman for Pabst Blue Ribbon beer on Jackie Gleason's The Life of Riley.

In September 1951, at the beginning of the second television season of The George Burns and Gracie Allen Show, he replaced the first season's announcer, Bill Goodwin, who had also announced the Burns & Allen radio show for many years. Appearing under his name (as Goodwin had), Harry Von Zell continued to play the befuddled friend of the Burns family, and the show-within-a-show's announcer, until 1958, the year of Gracie Allen's retirement and the conclusion of the series. Though ostensibly playing himself, the Von Zell character on the show was single; in real life, Von Zell was married with two children.

During the 1958–59 television season, Von Zell continued working with George Burns on his short-lived 25-week NBC sitcom, The George Burns Show. That same year, he wrote the teleplays for four episodes of NBC's Wagon Train, appearing in one of them. In 1959, he joined comedian George Gobel, announcing his single-season half-hour program on CBS. During 1960–61, he appeared in five episodes of the television series Bachelor Father as Frank Curtis, a good friend of Bentley Gregg (played by John Forsythe).

Von Zell appeared in the Perry Mason episodes "The Case of the Ancient Romeo" (1962), and as the murderer Sidney Hawes in "The Case of the Libelous Locket" (1963). He was cast in an episode of NBC's western series, The Tall Man, and appeared in an episode of McHale's Navy as Admiral Parker, the uncle of Tim Conway's character Ensign Parker. Von Zell's last appearance was on an episode of Ellery Queen in 1975.

Von Zell delivered the commentary on Celebrity Golf, a series of half-hour, nine-hole golf matches made in 1960 with Sam Snead taking on such Hollywood celebrities as Dean Martin, Jerry Lewis, and Bob Hope at Los Angeles golf courses such as Woodland Hills and Lakeside Country Club. Those matches were rerun in recent years on the Golf Channel.

In his later years, Von Zell was a commercial spokesman for Los Angeles-based savings and loan association Home Savings of America. In 1976 he was one of the many leading radio announcers who participated in a television special, The Good Old Days of Radio.

== Death ==
Harry Von Zell died of cancer on November 21, 1981, aged 75, at the Motion Picture & Television Country House and Hospital in Woodland Hills, California. Von Zell's body was cremated by the Neptune Society and the ashes were scattered in the sea.

== Radio credits ==
- Stars in the Air - Episode: "Weekend for Three" (1952)

== Bibliography ==
- Dunning, John (1998). On the Air : The Encyclopedia of Old-Time Radio. New York : Oxford University Press. ISBN 978-0-19-507678-3.
