= Dark Intruder =

1965 television film directed by Harvey Hart

- Theatrical release poster
- Directed by: Harvey Hart
- Written by: Barré Lyndon
- Produced by: Jack Laird
- Starring: Leslie Nielsen; Judi Meredith; Mark Richman
- Cinematography: John F. Warren
- Edited by: Edward W. Williams
- Music by: Lalo Schifrin
- Production company: Shamley Productions
- Distributed by: Universal Pictures
- Release date: July 21, 1965
- Running time: 59 minutes
- Country: United States
- Language: English

Dark Intruder is a 1965 horror film that starred Leslie Nielsen, Mark Richman and Judi Meredith. The film is set in San Francisco in 1890 concerning playboy sleuth and occult expert Brett Kingsford. This atmospheric black-and-white film, only 59 minutes long, was directed by Harvey Hart and was the pilot for a failed television series called The Black Cloak. It was written by Alfred Edgar (1896–1972), a British writer who wrote under the pseudonym of Barré Lyndon.

The Black Cloak was to be produced by Alfred Hitchcock's television company, Shamley Productions, which also produced Alfred Hitchcock Presents, The Alfred Hitchcock Hour and Suspicion, as well as the film Psycho. When the pilot was deemed too scary and violent for mid-sixties television, NBC sold it to Universal Pictures, where Hitchcock was under contract. Universal re-edited the pilot into a feature film and distributed it to drive-in theaters as the second feature to a double bill that also included William Castle’s I Saw What You Did (also 1965).

The plot and character greatly resembles Chamber of Horrors (1966), which was made the next year and had a similar fate. Critic Leonard Maltin wrote that Dark intruder featured: "Intricate plot and exceptional use of the time period blending with suspense", making it "a one-of-a-kind movie." Dark Intruder showed up from time to time on late night TV throughout the 1970s. In the 1971 Night Gallery episode "The Dear Departed", Harvey Lembeck's character suggests, while reading through a newspaper, going to the movies to see the double-feature Dark Intruder and Destiny of a Spy.

== Plot ==
The film opens, after the murder of a woman in dark alley by a mysterious caped figure, on a scene between Kingsford and his friend Evelyn Lang (Judi Meredith). Kingsford is an expert on the supernatural and, along with his dwarf assistant Nikola (Charles Bolender), is called in by police to uncover the scheme of a Sumerian demon to return to earth and take over a human body. A series of murders of women similar to those committed in 1888 London by Jack the Ripper has taken place in San Francisco; in those killings, however, a series of ivory-carved statuettes depicting a repulsive reptilian head is left beside each body. In each statuette found, the demon emerges from the back of a man, budding out further with each crime. It as though with each killing, the demon is freeing itself from its host a little bit more. There also seem to be connections between the four victims.

Kingsford initially consults an old Chinese curio dealer, Chi Zang (Peter Brocco) for advice. The dealer, (whose shop has a statue of a multi-armed Chinese god who may be Yu Lueh) shows Kingsford a mummified creature with a hideous fanged mouth which the priest claims is a Sumerian demon. This mummified demon is accompanied by a seven-spoked wheel. The priest says that the demon will commit seven killings, one for each spoke, until it accomplishes its purposes, according to mystic intervals of time known only to itself. Kingsford picks up the small mummy, but drops it when it becomes hot and leaves him with a scratched hand.

Kingsford then goes to the import shop of his friend and Evelyn's fiancée Robert Vandenburg (Peter Mark Richman), where they earlier arranged to meet. A shadow trails him, and in the shop, Kingsford is attacked by the same caped figure who murdered the woman at the beginning of the film. Kingsford fends off the attack and the figure disappears. The police arrive, as does Vandenburg.

== Cast ==
- Leslie Nielsen as Brett Kingsford
- Peter Mark Richman as Robert Vandenburg
- Judi Meredith as Evelyn Lang
- Gilbert Green as Harvey Misbach
- Charles Bolender as Nikola
- Werner Klemperer as Professor Malaki
- Vaughn Taylor as Dr. Burdett
- Peter Brocco as Chi Zang
- Bill Quinn as The Neighbor

== Reception ==
Author and film critic Leonard Maltin awarded the film three out of four stars, calling it 'a nearly flawless supernatural thriller'. In his review, Maltin commended the film's intricate plot, and "exceptional use of time period", but criticized the film's uneven performances. Dave Sindelar, on his website Fantastic Movie Musings and Ramblings gave the film a positive review, commending the atmosphere, interesting characters, and surprises in the story. TV Guide however, gave the film a mixed review, awarding it two out of five stars.
