= The George Burns Show =

- Genre: Comedy
- Written by: William Burns; Keith Fowler; Harvey Helm; Norman Paul
- Directed by: Rod Amateau
- Starring: George Burns; Bea Benaderet; Harry von Zell; Larry Keating; Ronnie Burns; Judi Meredith
- Composer: Jeff Alexander
- Country of origin: United States
- Original language: English
- No. of seasons: 1
- No. of episodes: 25

Production
- Producer: Rod Amateau
- Cinematography: James Van Trees
- Editor: Willard Nico
- Running time: 30 min
- Production companies: McCadden Productions; Banda Productions

Original release
- Network: NBC
- Release: October 21, 1958 – April 14, 1959

Related
- The George Burns and Gracie Allen Show

The George Burns Show is a comedy television program that aired on NBC for one season (1958–59). The program was sponsored by Colgate-Palmolive.

The George Burns Show immediately followed the eight-season run of The George Burns and Gracie Allen Show, which had aired on CBS, and shared continuity with the earlier series.

== Overview ==
After Gracie Allen retired in 1958, George Burns tried to continue the old series without her, using many of the characters and settings from their show. "I wanted to stay on television and I had an entire cast of wonderful actors looking for work, so we created The George Burns Show." In this new series, George was working as a producer in a downtown office, and trying to deal with an assortment of entertainers and oddball theatrical acts as well as his previously established friends. Blanche Morton (Bea Benaderet) was George's secretary, and was keeping George from fawning over attractive women, for Gracie's sake (Gracie was mentioned on the show, but never seen). Blanche's husband Harry Morton (Larry Keating) was George's accountant. Also present were Harry von Zell, Ronnie Burns, and Judi Meredith, all playing themselves. Meredith had appeared regularly as Ronnie's girlfriend Bonnie Sue MacAfee on the Burns and Allen show in 1957 and 1958; here she played essentially the same role but as herself.

For the February 1959 sweeps, the format was changed to a live sketch-comedy/variety show in the style of The Jack Benny Program, in an attempt to improve the ratings. The ratings didn't improve, however, so they reverted to the sitcom format.

Burns had been optimistic about the series, but realized why it failed: "The show had everything it needed to be successful except Gracie. The audience was so used to seeing this cast working with Gracie that everybody kept waiting for her to open the door and walk in. It was like sitting down to a big meal and having the soup, salad, and dessert -- while the main course was at home playing with her grandchildren." The series ended after 25 episodes.

== Episodes ==
No.	Title	Directed by	Written by	Original release date
1	"George and the Private Eye" "George Becomes a Producer"	Rod Amateau	William Burns, Keith Fowler, Harvey Helm, Norman Paul	October 21, 1958
George searches for a new property to produce but receives a tip not to touch a new detective series called "The Blonde Who Died Twice". Bob Cummings makes a brief appearance.
2	"Jack Benny Comes Over"	Unknown	Unknown	October 31, 1958
When Jack Benny drops by George's office and finds him teaching a dance routine to a young girl, he becomes jealous, concluding that George is rehearsing a new act for himself.
3	"The French Revue"	Unknown	Unknown	November 11, 1958
George tries to get Blanche to resign as his secretary, so he sends three beautiful Folies Bergère showgirls to her husband's office in an attempt to both arouse jealousy and tick her off.
4	"A Walk-on for George"	Rod Amateau	Norman Paul	November 18, 1958
When William Goetz offers George a bit part in Ronnie's new movie, George agrees to appear uncredited, not wishing to overshadow his son. Meanwhile, Von Zell falsely promises to get a waitress an audition with Goetz.
5	"The 18-Year-Old Novelist"	Rod Amateau	Keith Fowler	November 25, 1958
6	"Tony Martin Visits"	Unknown	Unknown	December 2, 1958
When Tony Martin is unable to appear at a singing engagement, George tries to weasel his way in as Tony's replacement.
7	"George's Eviction"	Unknown	Unknown	December 9, 1958
The landlord arrives to find vaudeville acts such as knife-throwers, tumblers and live animals, and threatens to evict George.
8	"Eddie Fisher Guests"	Unknown	Unknown	December 16, 1958
9	"La Vie En Rose" "A Wife for Christmas"	Rod Amateau	William Burns, Keith Fowler, Harvey Helm, Norman Paul	December 23, 1958
To prevent her deportation to France, George tries to get Colette married to a good old American citizen – like Harry von Zell.
10	"Dale Robertson Guests"	Unknown	Unknown	December 30, 1958
11	"George Signs Carol Channing"	Unknown	Unknown	January 6, 1959
George uses Carol Channing's absent-mindedness to his advantage when he gets her to sign a contract for a nightclub appearance.
12	"Anna Maria Alberghetti Guests"	Unknown	Unknown	January 13, 1959
George sings and dances with Anna Maria Alberghetti, and then escorts her to a Hollywood premiere for a chat with silent movie star Sybil Wentworth.
13	"George on Juke Box Jury"	Unknown	Unknown	January 20, 1959
George learns that his newly released record is going to be rated on disc jockey Peter Potter's TV show Jukebox Jury by a special panel composed of the children of various celebrities.
14	"Rosemary Clooney Guests"	Unknown	Unknown	January 27, 1959
With this episode, there was a brief change in the show's format. George presented a variety show featuring his regular cast and guest stars- and for the next four weeks, it was telecast "live".
15	"Carol Channing Guests"	Unknown	Unknown	February 3, 1959
16	"Xavier Cugat and Abbe Lane Guest"	Unknown	Unknown	February 10, 1959
17	"Howard Duff Guests"	Unknown	Unknown	February 17, 1959
18	"Ronnie Takes an Apartment"	Unknown	Unknown	February 24, 1959
19	"Jimmie Rodgers Moves in with Ronnie"	Unknown	Unknown	March 3, 1959
When Jimmie Rodgers moves in with Ronnie, the apartment is suddenly overrun with pretty young groupies, so a jealous Judi turns to George for help.
20	"The Landlord's Daughter"	Unknown	Unknown	March 10, 1959
George finds himself in an ethical conundrum when Mr. Knox, the building's landlord, offers him a five year lease in return for discouraging his talented daughter Linda from pursuing a career in showbiz.
21	"The Orchid Room" "Contract to Sing"	Unknown	Unknown	March 17, 1959
George books Ronnie and Judi at The Orchid Room, but when he learns they'll be performing downstairs, he decides to take over the engagement himself, fearing that singing in a basement could ruin his son's career.
22	"George's Trial"	Unknown	Unknown	March 24, 1959
When the owner of the club where George is performing cancels his contract due to poor attendance, George decides to take him to court.
23	"Breaking Up the Team"	Rod Amateau	William Burns, Keith Fowler, Norman Paul	March 31, 1959
Ronnie and Judi audition for the producer of a Broadway revue, but when he turns them down, Ronnie decides to break up the act so Judi can get ahead – but George comes up with a devious plan to keep them together.
24	"The Monster Trend"	Unknown	Unknown	April 7, 1959
When George produces a horror movie, he auditions actors in makeup which leads the other tenants to believe that the building's been taken over by monsters.
25	"George Invests in a Record Company"	Unknown	Unknown	April 14, 1959
When George invests in a record company, he has an ulterior motive: he wants to cut his own album.
