= Etta McDaniel =

American actress (1890–1946)

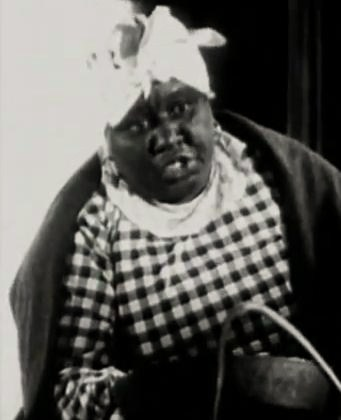
- McDaniel in Hearts in Bondage (1936)
- Born: December 1, 1890; Wichita, Kansas, U.S.
- Died: January 13, 1946 (aged 55); Los Angeles, California, U.S.
- Resting place: Calvary Cemetery, Los Angeles, California, U.S
- Occupation: Actress
- Years active: 1914–1945
- Spouse: John Alfred Goff (m. 1908)
- Children: 1
- Relatives: Hattie McDaniel (sister); Sam McDaniel (brother)

Etta McDaniel (December 1, 1890 – January 13, 1946) was an American actress who appeared in over 60 films between 1933 and 1946.

== Early life ==
McDaniel was born in Wichita, Kansas. She was the sister of actor Sam McDaniel and Academy Award winning actress Hattie McDaniel. The family moved to Denver when she was in the first grade.

== Career ==
In 1914, Etta Goff and her sister Hattie McDaniel launched an all-female minstrel show, called the McDaniel Sisters Company. Joined by their brother, they formed a trio that toured the Pantages vaudeville circuit for years.

McDaniel's feature film debut was in the 1933 King Kong, portraying a native dancer. She then became a supporting actress or extra, frequently in uncredited roles, performing as maids and nannies, including Lawless Nineties, 1936, a Western starring John Wayne.

== Personal life and death ==
McDaniel married John Alfred Goff on December 2, 1908, in Denver, Colorado. Her son was Edgar Henry Goff. McDaniel died in Los Angeles, California, aged 55.

== Partial filmography ==
- King Kong (1933) as Native Woman
- Personal Maid's Secret (1935) as Maid
- The Arizonian (1935) uncredited
- The Prisoner of Shark Island (1936)
- The Devil is a Sissy (1936)
- Hearts in Bondage (1936)
- Lawless Nineties (1936)
- The Magnificent Brute (1936)
- Termites of 1938 (1938)
- Life with Henry (1941)
- Johnny Doughboy (1942)
- The Great Man's Lady (1942)
- Son of Dracula (1943)
