= The George Burns and Gracie Allen Show =

American television series (1950–1958)

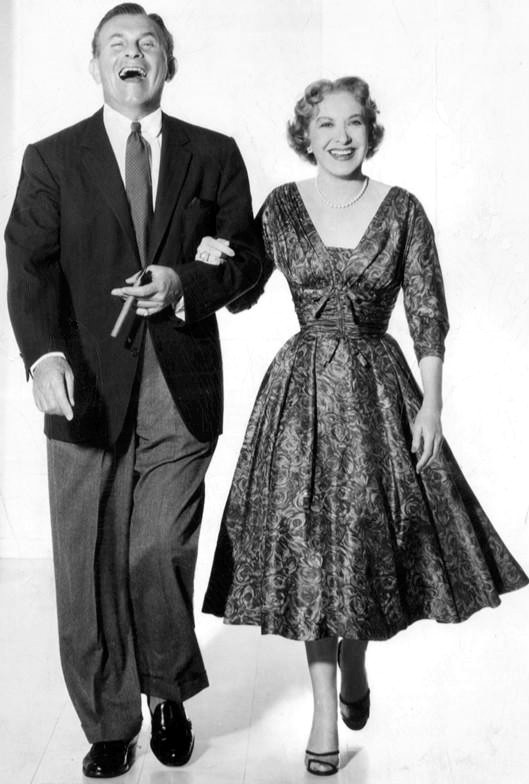
- Burns and Allen in 1955
- Also known as: The Burns and Allen Show
- Genre: Situation comedy
- Starring: George Burns; Gracie Allen; Bea Benaderet; Hal March (1950–51); John Brown (1951); Fred Clark (1951–53); Larry Keating (1953–58); Rolfe Sedan; Bill Goodwin (1950–51); Harry Von Zell (1951–58); Ronnie Burns
- Opening theme: "Love Nest" (1920) by Louis A. Hirsch and Otto Harbach
- Country of origin: United States
- No. of seasons: 8
- No. of episodes: 291 (list of episodes)

Production
- Running time: 24–25 minutes
- Production company: McCadden Productions

Original release
- Network: CBS
- Release: October 12, 1950 – September 15, 1958

Related
- The George Burns Show

The George Burns and Gracie Allen Show, sometimes called The Burns and Allen Show, is a half-hour television sitcom broadcast from 1950 to 1958 on CBS. It starred George Burns and Gracie Allen, one of the most enduring acts in entertainment history. Burns and Allen were headliners in vaudeville in the 1920s, and radio stars in the 1930s and 1940s. Their situation comedy TV series received Emmy Award nominations throughout its eight-year run.

== Production ==
A half-hour TV series broadcast October 12, 1950 – September 22, 1958, on CBS, The George Burns and Gracie Allen Show was initially staged live and broadcast every other Thursday at 8 pm ET. In fall 1952, it became a weekly series filmed on the West Coast. From March 1953 through September 1958, The Burns and Allen Show aired Mondays at 8 pm ET.

The show was an immediate success. Six episodes were produced live from the Mansfield Theatre in New York, with the stage set as the Burns's living room. The show relocated to the CBS Columbia Square facilities in Hollywood beginning with the seventh episode.

Ever the businessman, Burns realized it would be more efficient to do the series on film; the half-hour episodes could then be syndicated. From that point on, the show was filmed at General Service Studios without a live audience present; however, each installment was screened before an audience to provide live responses prior to the episodes being broadcast. With 291 episodes, the show had a long network run through 1958 and continued in syndicated reruns for years.

The sets were designed to look like the couple's real-life residence. An establishing shot of the actual house on Maple Drive in Beverly Hills, California, was often used. Although extensively remodeled, that house still exists today—including the study over the garage where George would "escape" from Gracie's illogical logic. Burns lived in the house until his death in 1996, at the age of 100.

One running gag of the TV show involved a closet full of hats belonging to various visitors to the Burns household, who would slip out the door unnoticed and leave their hats behind rather than face another round with Gracie. The format had George watching all the action (standing outside the proscenium arch in early live episodes; watching the show on TV in his study towards the end of the series) and breaking the fourth wall by commenting upon it to the viewers. Another running gag was George's weekly "firing" of announcer Harry Von Zell after he turned up aiding, abetting, or otherwise not stopping the mayhem prompted by Gracie's illogical logic.

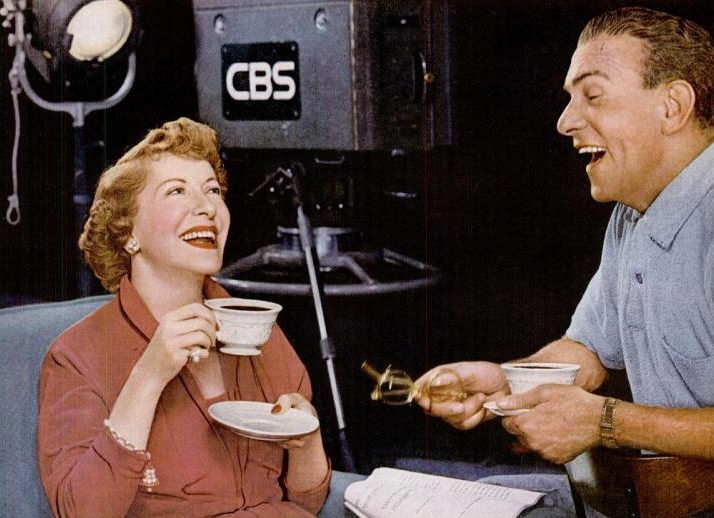
Burns and Allen in 1953

During the course of the eight-year run, the TV show had remarkable consistency in its cast and crew. The episodes were produced and directed by Ralph Levy (1950–53); Frederick de Cordova, later producer of NBC's The Tonight Show Starring Johnny Carson (1953–56); and Rod Amateau (1956–58). The original writing staff consisted of Sid Dorfman, Harvey Helm, Paul Henning, and William Burns (George's brother). Later writers included Nate Monaster, Jesse Goldstein, Norman Paul, and Keith Fowler. The associate producer was Al Simon, the director of photography was Philip Tannura, A.S.C., and the editor was Larry Heath. The show's primary sponsor was Carnation Evaporated Milk, later alternating with B.F. Goodrich (1952–55, 1956–57), and General Mills, for Betty Crocker (1955–56, 1957–58).

Bea Benaderet carried over from the Burns and Allen radio show, portraying neighbor Blanche Morton, but over the course of the series, four different actors played her husband. The character's first name was "Harry", the same first name as the real-life announcer Harry Von Zell, requiring the writers to craft dialogue that would distinguish the two characters' names. Blanche's husband Harry Morton was first portrayed by Hal March (October–December 1950), then John Brown (January–June 1951), and after that, Fred Clark, until 1953 and Larry Keating until 1958. In one episode, "Morton Buys Iron Deer/Gracie Thinks George Needs Glasses", George walks on-stage and freezes the scene just before Harry's entrance and explains that Clark has left the show to perform on Broadway. He introduces Larry Keating, who enters, and then calls over Bea Benaderet to introduce the two saying, "This is Larry Keating and he is going to be your husband now". The pair greet and chat briefly, complimenting each other on their previous work. George remarks that if they are going to be so nice to each other, no one will believe they are married. Burns then gives a cue, Blanche resumes her position, and the scene continues where it stopped as if nothing had happened. The new Harry enters and Blanche hits him in the head with a catalog for spending $200 to buy an iron deer.

Also appearing in the TV series were Burns and Allen's two children. Ronnie, adopted in 1935, and Sandra, adopted the year before, first appeared in the third-season episode, "Uncle Clyde Comes to Visit" (January 1, 1953), playing themselves. The teenagers are in the Burns living room, threading a 16 mm projector with that night's episode. In voiceover, George introduces them, and tells the audience that they have been away at school and that is why we have not met them before. Ronnie made a guest appearance on the episode "Gracie Gives Wedding in Payment of a Favor" (October 18, 1954), playing a character named Jim Goodwin, and was introduced to the audience at the episode's conclusion. Ronnie joined the regular cast October 10, 1955, playing himself, but cast as a young drama student who tended to look askance at his parents' comedy style. Their daughter, Sandra, declined becoming a regular member of the cast, although she appeared in a few episodes as a classmate of Ronnie. In one episode, Ronnie's drama class puts on a vaudeville show to raise funds for the school. Gracie hosts the show while Ronnie and Sandy deliver an impersonation of their famous parents along with one of their classic routines. Since Ronnie played himself, Gracie closed the segment with a wisecrack: "The boy was produced by Burns and Allen."

Starting in the fall of 1955, Burns and Allen often reappeared after the end of the episode, before a curtain decorated with the names and locations of the various theaters where they headlined in their vaudeville days. They would perform one of their signature "double routines", often discussing one of Gracie's fictional relatives (including "Death Valley Allen" the prospector, "Florence Allen" the nurse, "Casey Allen" the railroad man). Burns always ended the show with variations on “Say goodnight, Gracie” (more often “Gracie, say goodnight”, to which Allen simply replied, "Goodnight." She never said, "Goodnight, Gracie", as legend has it. Burns was once asked this question and said it would have been a funny line. Asked why he did not do it, Burns replied, "Incredibly enough, no one ever thought of it."

In March 1953, The George Burns and Gracie Allen Show joined I Love Lucy as part of the CBS Monday-night primetime lineup. As a result, the show entered the top 30 television programs in the Nielsen ratings ranking at number 20. For the 1954–1955 season, it ranked number 26, and for both the 1955–56 and 1956–57 seasons it was number 28.

With I Love Lucy ending its six-year run on CBS in the spring of 1957, the television network wanted to renew the Burns and Allen series, but by this time, Allen had grown tired of performing. Nevertheless, Burns committed both of them for another year, which would be their eighth—and last—on television.

Allen announced her retirement on February 17, 1958, to be effective at the end of the current season.

"It really was her last scene, the last time she appeared on a stage", Burns wrote of the episode filmed June 4, 1958.

Burns and Allen filmed their last show on June 4, 1958. The filming was an emotional experience, although nothing was said about it being Allen's last performance. At the wrap party, Allen took a token sip of champagne from a paper cup, hugged her friend and co-star Bea Benaderet, and said "Okay, that's it." After a brief last look around the set, she said, "And thank you very much, everyone."

"She deserved a rest," Burns said when Allen devoted herself to gardening and being a homemaker:

She had been working all her life, and her lines were the toughest in the world to do. They didn't make sense, so she had to memorize every word. It took a real actress. Every spare moment—in bed, under the hair dryer—had to be spent in learning lines. Do you wonder that she's happy to be rid of it?

Burns attempted to continue the show with the same supporting cast but without Allen. The George Burns Show lasted one season (October 21, 1958 – April 14, 1959) on NBC.

Following a mild heart attack in the 1950s, Allen suffered a series of angina episodes over a number of years. She had a major heart attack in 1961. She lived a slower but comfortable retirement for another three years, often appearing in public with her husband, but never performing. Gracie Allen died August 27, 1964, as Burns was underway with his short-lived ABC sitcom, Wendy and Me, with Connie Stevens and a cast including Ron Harper, James T. Callahan, and J. Pat O'Malley. All the TV shows were produced under the banner of McCadden Productions, a company run by George Burns which he named after the street on which his brother William lived. McCadden also produced the iconic TV show Mister Ed. The McCadden catalog is now owned by Sony Pictures Television.

== Episodes ==
Season	Episodes	Originally released	
Season	Episodes	First released	Last released
1	26	October 12, 1950	September 13, 1951
2	26	September 27, 1951	September 25, 1952
3	40	October 9, 1952	August 17, 1953
4	40	October 5, 1953	August 23, 1954
5	40	October 4, 1954	July 4, 1955
6	40	October 3, 1955	September 24, 1956
7	40	October 1, 1956	July 1, 1957
8	39	September 30, 1957	September 15, 1958

== Accolades ==
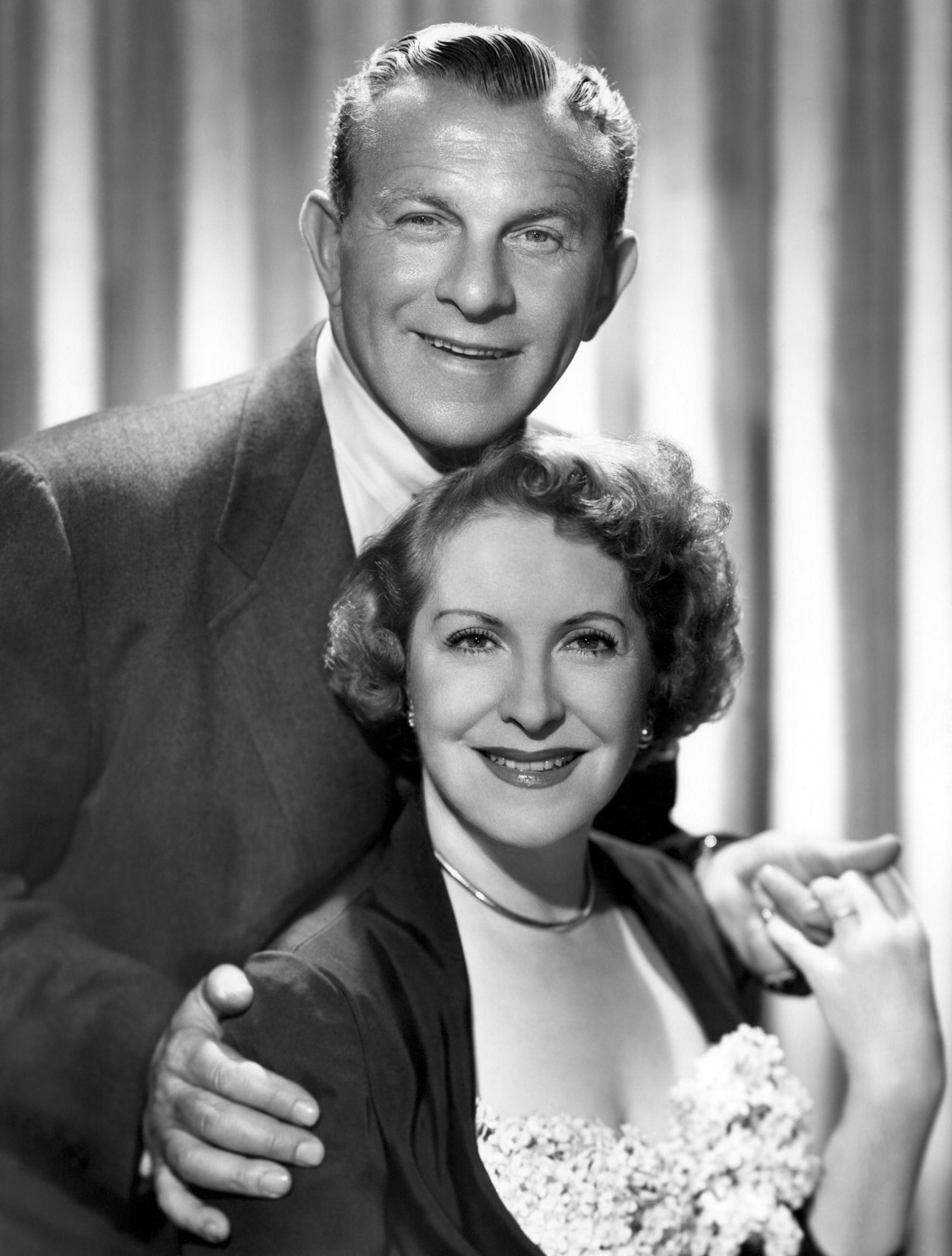
Burns and Allen in 1952

The George Burns and Gracie Allen Show received the following Primetime Emmy Award nominations:

- 1952: Best Comedy Show
- 1953: Best Situation Comedy Series
- 1954: Best Situation Comedy Series
- 1954: Bea Benaderet, Best Series Supporting Actress
- 1955: Best Situation Comedy Series
- 1955: Gracie Allen, Best Actress Starring in a Regular Series
- 1955: Bea Benaderet, Best Supporting Actress in a Regular Series
- 1956: Gracie Allen, Best Actress, Continuing Performance
- 1957: Gracie Allen, Best Continuing Performance by a Comedienne in a Series
- 1958: Gracie Allen, Best Continuing Performance by a Comedienne in a Series
- 1959: Gracie Allen, Best Continuing Performance by an Actress in a Leading Role (Continuing Character) in a Comedy Series

In 1997, the 1954 episode, "Columbia Pictures Doing Burns and Allen Story", was ranked No. 56 on TV Guide's 100 Greatest Episodes of All-Time.

== Home media ==
The kinescope recordings of the live telecasts from the 1950–1952 seasons of The George Burns and Gracie Allen Show are thought to be in the public domain; they are available on "dollar DVD" collections and have rerun as part of America One's public domain sitcom rotation and on public television stations.

A select number of episodes were released on VHS by Columbia TriStar Home Video.

- 1992: Burns and Allen Christmas. Burbank, California: Columbia TriStar Home Video, 1992, VHS 92763, ISBN 978-0-8001-1532-6. Contains the episodes "Company for Christmas" (6.12) and "Christmas in Jail" (7.13).
