= Ronnie Burns (actor) =

American actor (1935–2007)

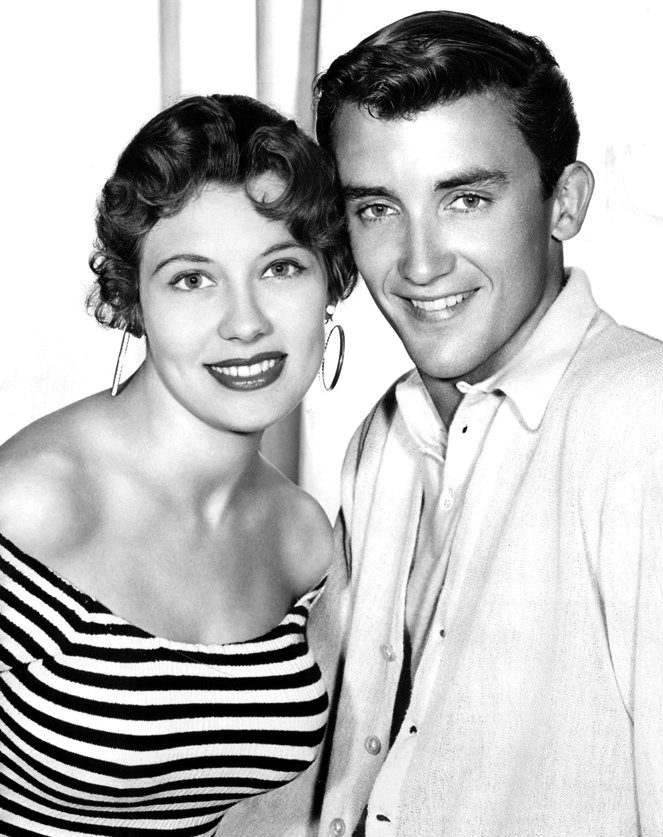
- Burns with actress Jacqueline Beer from the Burns and Allen television show, 1956
- Born: Ronald Jon Burns (name given after adoption); July 9, 1935; Evanston, Illinois, U.S.
- Died: November 14, 2007 (aged 72); Pacific Palisades, California, U.S.
- Occupation: Actor
- Years active: 1950–1961
- Spouses: Peggy Lyon (m. 1965; div. 1972) Janice Powell (m. 1977)
- Children: 3
- Parent(s): George Burns; Gracie Allen

Ronald Jon Burns (July 9, 1935 – November 14, 2007) was an American television actor. He is primarily remembered as the son of comedians George Burns and Gracie Allen and a regular cast member of The George Burns and Gracie Allen Show (1950–58) on CBS.

== Biography ==
Born in Evanston, Illinois, Ronnie Burns was eleven weeks old when he was adopted in Chicago on September 27, 1935, by George Burns and Gracie Allen. His older sister, Sandra Jean, had been adopted the year before by Burns and Allen, and was then 13 months old. According to George Burns, Ronnie had been the most sickly baby up for adoption from the agency, and Gracie chose him because she particularly felt he needed their help.

Burns and his sister Sandra had roles as themselves in the March 15, 1951, episode "The Vanderlips' Dinner Party" CBS television series The George Burns and Gracie Allen Show. On October 10, 1955, Burns joined as a regular cast member playing himself but cast as a novice actor and college student studying drama who tended to look askance at his parents' comedy style. He first appeared on the show on October 18, 1954, as the bridegroom on the episode "Gracie Gives a Wedding in Payment of a Favor" (Season 5, Episode 3). Upon joining the show full-time, numerous episodes revolved around the fictional Ronnie Burns's dating and social life. His good looks and popularity helped the show gain the attention of younger viewers in its final years. Later he appeared on The George Burns Show (1958–59), a short-lived series produced after his mother retired from show business.

Burns starred in the 1960–61 NBC comedy series Happy, in which he and Yvonne Lime Fedderson played Chris and Sally Day, the parents of a talking baby. He played the manager of the Palm Desert Hotel in Palm Springs. Lloyd Corrigan, Doris Packer, and Burt Metcalfe had supporting roles.

He made an uncredited appearance as Wallace on the "Young at Heart" episode of The Honeymooners, which featured Ralph Kramden (Jackie Gleason) trying to roller skate with disastrous results. Burns made a cameo appearance on Bachelor Father starring John Forsythe.

Never comfortable with celebrity, Burns left acting. He produced a situation comedy, Wendy and Me (1964–65), in which his father starred. He then went into real estate investment and raised horses at a ranch he owned in Santa Ynez, California.

Ronnie Burns died November 14, 2007, of cancer at age 72, in his Pacific Palisades home. He was survived by his wife, Janice, three sons from his first marriage: Brent, Brad, and Bryan Burns, six grandchildren, and his sister, Sandra.
