= Jukebox Jury (TV series) =

American TV musical program (1953–1954)

Jukebox Jury is an American musical television program that was broadcast on ABC from September 13, 1953, to March 28, 1954, and it was later syndicated. The program was also known as The Peter Potter Show.

== Local TV ==
Jukebox Jury began as a local program in Los Angeles. on KNXT. The show ran for 90 minutes. A panel of six celebrities listened to records that had not been released to the public and speculated on the likelihood of success for each recording. A review in the San Mateo Times called the program "very entertaining".

November 5, 1955, was the program's last day Jukebox Jury KNXT. It was moved to KRCA-TV in Los Angeles, on Fridays from 10 to 11 p.m. Pacific Time beginning on November 11, 1955. Kinescopes of those episodes were broadcast on 18 stations in 11 states in the western United States. Sponsors included Regal Pale Brewing Company. Beginning in July 1958, a deal between Potter and the head of Music Operators of America provided that recordings of the show's hit of the week would be placed in 10,000 jukeboxes in the viewing area. Accompanying that placement, a "hit-of-the-week decal" that promoted the show's sponsor was to be put on each jukebox, with the decal's color matching that of the hit's indicator card in the machine. The arrangement was something new, as jukebox operators had not previously allowed commercial displays on their machines. By February 1959 it was on KTTV-TV, also in Los Angeles.

The network version initially was blacked out in the Los Angeles area. Later that version was carried on KECA-TV there.

== Network TV ==
=== Overview ===
In each episode a celebrity panel listened to new recordings and then predicted whether or not they would be successful. Episodes included "presentation of guests from all fields of show business". Details provided about records went beyond the titles and artists to include "orchestras, writers, arrangers and just about everyone else concerned with them". If the panel tied on deciding whether the song would succeed, in some cases the studio audience made the decision; in other cases a disc jockey somewhere in the United States was on standby via telephone to cast the deciding vote. Each episode typically contained six records.

Guests on the panel included Jerry Colonna, Piper Laurie, Jack Palance, Johnny Mercer, Marilyn Maxwell, Rock Hudson, Jane Powell, Vic Damone, Frances Faye, Betty Hutton, Gordon MacRae, Margaret Whiting, Ella Mae Morse, Barbara Lawrence, Robert Stack, and Art Linkletter.

By November 1, 1953, the program's name had been changed to The Peter Potter Show.

=== Production ===
Originating live from Hollywood, Jukebox Jury initially was broadcast on Sundays from 9:30 to 10:30 p.m. Eastern Time. In January 1954 its length was reduced, changing its time slot to 9:30 to 10 p.m. The Hazel Bishop cosmetics company was the sponsor. Dick Gottlieb was the director. Cameras with telephoto lenses provided provided views of panelists' reactions as they heard records and of the singers whose records were being evaluated.

== Critical response ==
Time magazine commented that Potter's "special brand of sugary archness is sometimes topped by the coy commercials for Hazel Bishop lipstick".

C. E. Butterfield wrote in an Associated Press story, "Perhaps due to opening night jitters, the program got off to a tedious start."

James Devane wrote in The Cincinnati Enquirer, "The panelists discuss the records at length and with reasonable honesty. Since they, too, are show people, their remarks about a singer's efforts are often tempered with kindness but still they manage to indicate that maudlin lyrics are maudlin and trite arrangements trite."

== Network radio ==
Jukebox Jury became a feature on CBS Radio beginning on May 30, 1954. It was heard on Sundays at 7 p.m. E.T., running for an hour effective June 13, 1954, as the summer replacement for Jack Benny's program and Amos 'n' Andy. It returned in that same time slot as a replacement for those two programs in the summer of 1955.

== Syndication and international distribution ==
National Telefilm Associates began syndicating Jukebox Jury in February 1959. KTTV-TV recorded episodes on videotape for distribution. The one-hour episodes were broadcast weekly in 14 markets by May 1959. In November 1959 Potter leased rights for versions of Jukebox Jury to be broadcast in the UK, France, Germany, Norway, and Sweden. Plans called for each country to have its own version with the host, panelists, and recordings coming from that country.
