= Nancy Kulp =

American actress and educator (1921–1991)

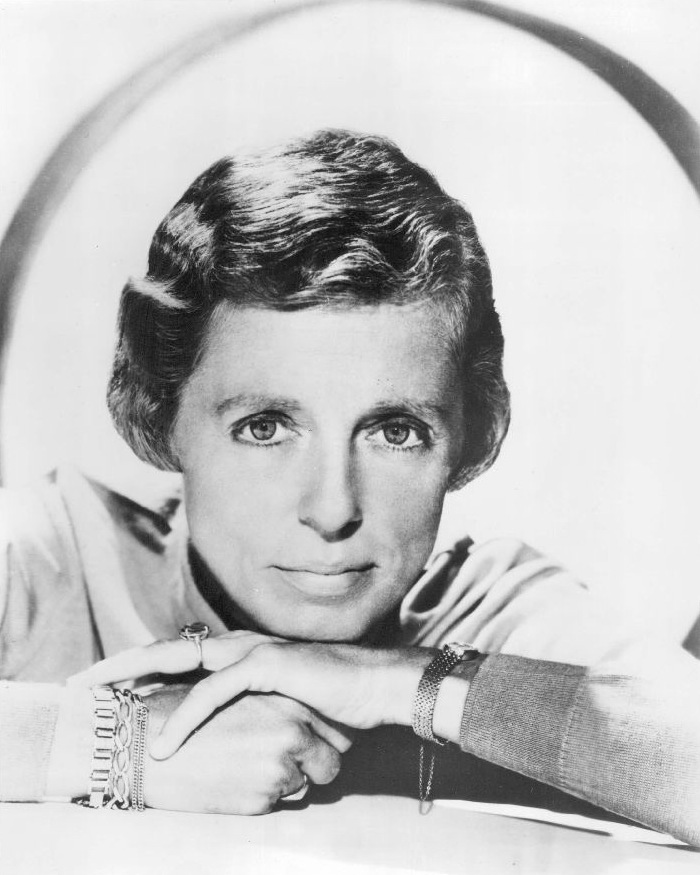
- Kulp in 1960s
- Born: Nancy Jane Kulp; August 28, 1921; Harrisburg, Pennsylvania, U.S.
- Died: February 3, 1991 (aged 69); Palm Desert, California, U.S.
- Resting place: Westminster Presbyterian Cemetery, Mifflintown, Pennsylvania
- Education: Florida State University (BA); University of Miami (MA)
- Occupations: Actress; comedian; writer
- Years active: 1951–1989
- Political party: Democratic
- Spouse: Charles Dacus (m. 1951; div. 1953)
- Military service
- Allegiance: United States
- Service: United States Naval Reserve
- Service years: 1944–1946
- Rank: Lieutenant, junior grade
- Wars: World War II; American Theater
- Awards: American Campaign Medal

Nancy Jane Kulp (August 28, 1921 – February 3, 1991) was an American character actor, writer and comedian widely known as Miss Jane Hathaway on the CBS television series The Beverly Hillbillies.

== Early life ==
Kulp was born to Robert Tilden and Marjorie C. (née Snyder) Kulp in Harrisburg, Pennsylvania. She was their only child. Kulp's father was a traveling salesman, and her mother was a schoolteacher and later a principal. The family moved from Mifflintown, Pennsylvania, to Miami sometime before 1935.

In 1943, Kulp graduated with a bachelor's degree in journalism from Florida State College for Women (now Florida State University). She continued her studies for a master's degree in English and French at the University of Miami, where she was a member of the sorority Pi Beta Phi. Early in the 1940s, she also worked as a feature writer for the Miami Beach Tropics newspaper, writing profiles of celebrities such as Clark Gable and the Duke and Duchess of Windsor.

== Military service ==
In 1944, during World War II, Kulp left the University of Miami to join the U.S. Naval Reserve. She attained the rank of lieutenant, junior grade, and received several decorations while in the service, including the American Campaign Medal. She was honorably discharged in 1946.

== Career ==
=== Film ===
In 1951, not long after marrying Charles Malcolm Dacus, Kulp moved to Van Nuys to work in MGM's publicity department. At the studio, director George Cukor soon convinced her that she should be an actress, so the same year she began her MGM publicity job, she also made her film debut as a character actress in The Model and the Marriage Broker. She then appeared in other films, including Shane, Sabrina, and A Star is Born. After working in television on The Bob Cummings Show and on Perry Mason in "The Case of the Deadly Toy" in 1959, Kulp returned to movies in Forever, Darling, The Three Faces of Eve, The Parent Trap, Who's Minding the Store?, and The Aristocats. In 1966, she appeared as Wilhelmina Peterson in the film The Night of the Grizzly, starring Clint Walker and Martha Hyer.

=== Television ===
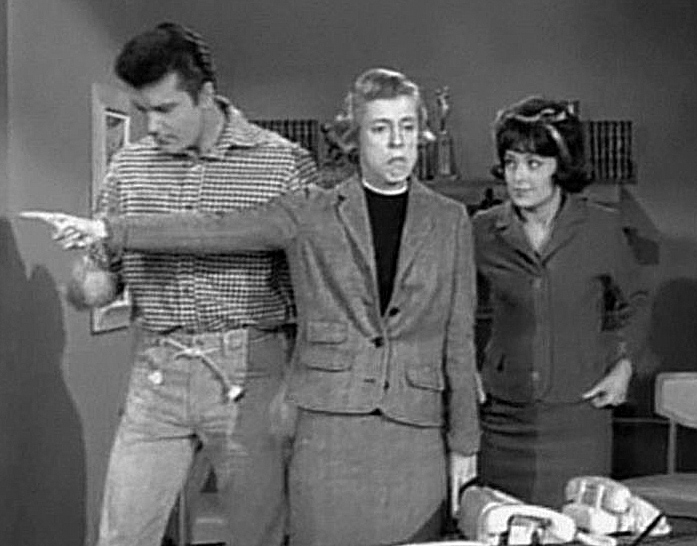
Kulp (center) with Max Baer Jr. and Sharon Tate in The Beverly Hillbillies, 1965

In 1955, Kulp joined the cast of The Bob Cummings Show (Love That Bob) with Bob Cummings, portraying pith-helmeted neighborhood bird watcher Pamela Livingstone. In 1956, she appeared as a waitress in the episode "Johnny Bravo" of the ABC/Warner Brothers series Cheyenne, with Clint Walker. Kulp played the role of Anastasia in three episodes of the NBC sitcom It's a Great Life in 1955 and 1956. In 1958, she appeared in Orson Welles' little-known pilot episode "The Fountain of Youth" in the television series Colgate Theatre. In 1960, she appeared as Emma St. John in the episode "Kill with Kindness" of the ABC/WB detective series Bourbon Street Beat, starring Andrew Duggan.

Kulp appeared on I Love Lucy in the 1956 episode "Lucy Meets the Queen", performing as an English maid, who shows Lucy and Ethel how to curtsy properly before Queen Elizabeth. Kulp also appeared in episodes of The Real McCoys, Perry Mason ("The Case of the Prodigal Parent", 1958, and "The Case of the Deadly Toy", 1959), The Jack Benny Program ("Don's 27th Anniversary with Jack"), 87th Precinct ("Killer's Choice"), Pete and Gladys, The Twilight Zone (as Mrs. Gann in "The Fugitive"), and Outlaws ("The Dark Sunrise of Griff Kincaid, Esquire"). Kulp portrayed a slurring-drunk waitress in a scene with James Garner and Jean Willes in the 1959 Maverick episode "Full House". She played a housekeeper in a pilot for The William Bendix Show, which aired as the 1960–1961 season finale of CBS's Mister Ed under the title "Pine Lake Lodge". On the series My Three Sons in 1962, she portrayed a high school math and science teacher in two episodes under different character names, Miss Harris and Miss Fisher.

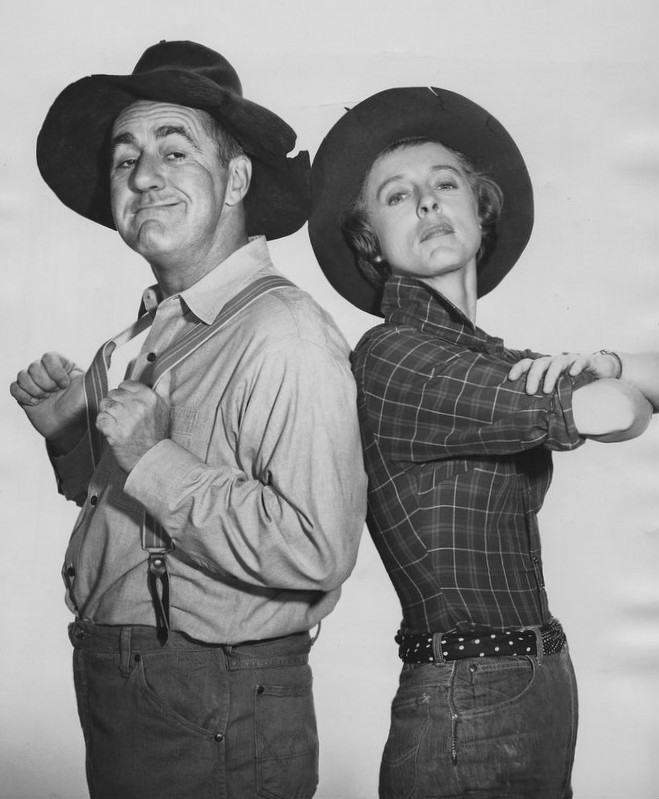
Guest star Jim Backus with Kulp in The Beverly Hillbillies (1963)

Shortly after her performances on My Three Sons in 1962, Kulp landed her breakout role as Jane Hathaway, the love-starved, bird-watching, perennial spinster, on the CBS television series The Beverly Hillbillies. In 1967, she received an Emmy Award nomination for her role, and she remained with the show until its cancellation in 1971. In 1978, she appeared on The Love Boat in the episode "Mike and Ike / The Witness / The Kissing Bandit" and she played Aunt Gertrude in the episode "Tony and Julie / Separate Beds / America's Sweetheart". On April 7, 1989, she played a nun in the Quantum Leap season 1 episode "The Right Hand of God". Kulp also appeared on The Brian Keith Show and Sanford and Son.

=== Theatre ===
Kulp also performed in the Broadway production of Morning's at Seven in 1980 to 1981 as Aaronetta Gibbs as a replacement for Elizabeth Wilson in the Lyceum Theatre.

== Politics, academia and retirement ==
Nancy Kulp served on the board of the Screen Actors Guild (SAG) while living in California. In 1984, after working with the Democratic state committee in her home state of Pennsylvania "on a variety of projects" over a period of years, Kulp ran unopposed as the Democratic nominee for the United States House of Representatives from Pennsylvania's 9th congressional district. As an opponent of six-term Republican Bud Shuster in a Republican-dominated district, Kulp was a decided underdog. Sixty-two years old at the time, Kulp said some voters might feel her background as an actress was "frivolous". However, she noted that Ronald Reagan had taken the route from screen to politics; she also noted that anyone who "listens and cares" can do well.

To her dismay, her Hillbillies co-star Buddy Ebsen, an ardent Republican, contacted the Shuster campaign and volunteered to make a radio campaign ad in which he called Kulp "too liberal". Kulp and Ebsen had a somewhat frosty relationship on set in part because of their sharp political differences. Later, Kulp said of Ebsen, "He's not the kindly old Jed Clampett that you saw on the show ... It's none of his business and he should have stayed out of it." She said Ebsen and she "didn't get along because I found him difficult to work with. But I never would have done something like this to him." Garnering 59,449 votes—just 33.6% of the ballots cast in the election—to Shuster's 117,203 votes and 66.4%, she lost. After this, according to her close friends and family, Ebsen was regarded as persona non grata to Kulp and she made it clear to people not to bring him up in conversation around her with the exception of interviews related to her time on Hillbillies. In his later years, especially after Kulp's death, Ebsen privately expressed remorse for doing the ad and they only reconciled shortly before Kulp's death.

After her defeat, she worked at Juniata College, a private liberal arts college in Huntingdon, Pennsylvania, as an artist-in-residence. She later taught acting.

== Personal life ==
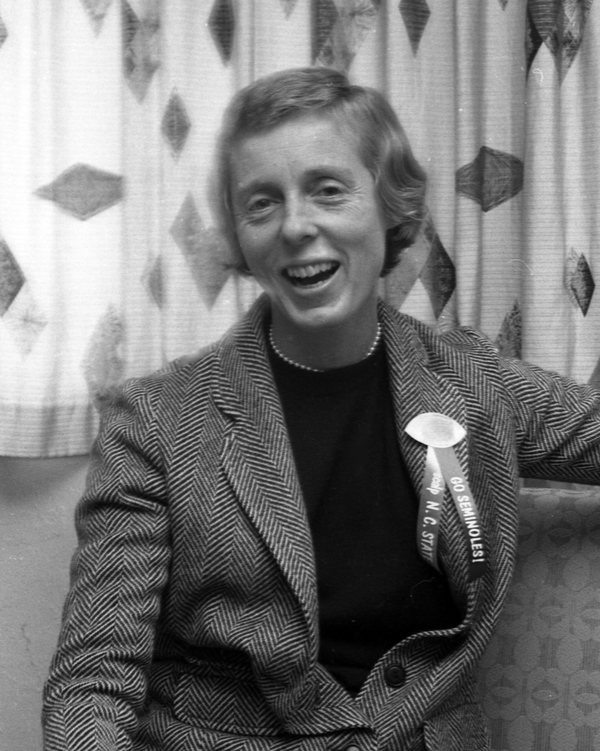
Kulp in Tallahassee wearing a button supporting FSU football

Kulp married Charles Malcolm Dacus, an account executive with WTVJ, on April 1, 1951, at Miami Beach Community Church. She was 29 and he was 23. According to the engagement announcement, they had already been dating for five years. Kulp and Dacus divorced in 1953.

After her retirement from acting and teaching, she moved first to a farm in Connecticut and later to Palm Springs, California, where she became involved in several charity organizations, including the Humane Society of the Desert, the Desert Theatre League, and United Cerebral Palsy.

Later, Nancy Kulp gave an interview to author and LGBT activist Boze Hadleigh, for his book "Hollywood Lesbians" in which she said,

As long as you reproduce my reply word for word, and the question, you may use it ... I'd appreciate it if you'd let me phrase the question. There is more than one way. Here's how I would ask it: "Do you think that opposites attract?" My own reply would be that I'm the other sort—I find that birds of a feather flock together. That answers your question.

== Death ==
Kulp was diagnosed with cancer in 1990 and received chemotherapy. By 1991, the cancer had spread, and she died on February 3, 1991, aged 69, in Palm Desert, California. Her remains are interred at Westminster Presbyterian Cemetery in Mifflintown, Pennsylvania.

== Filmography ==
=== Film ===
Year	Title	Role	Notes
1951	The Model and the Marriage Broker	Hazel Gingras	Uncredited
1952	Steel Town	Dolores	
1952	The Marrying Kind	Edie	Uncredited
1953	Shane	Mrs. Howells	
1953	The Caddy	Emma	Uncredited
1953	Here Come the Girls	Washwoman	Uncredited
1954	Sabrina	Jenny, maid	Uncredited
1954	A Star is Born	Esther's neighbor in rooming house	Uncredited
1955	The Shrike	Mrs. Coleman	Uncredited
1955	Not as a Stranger	Deirdre	Uncredited
1955	You're Never Too Young	Marty's Mother	
1955	Count Three and Pray	Matty Miller	
1956	Anything Goes	A bobby soxer	Uncredited
1956	Forever, Darling	Amy	
1957	Shoot-Out at Medicine Bend	Cleaning Woman	Uncredited
1957	God Is My Partner	Maxine Spelvana	
1957	The Three Faces of Eve	Mrs. Black	
1957	Kiss Them for Me	WAVE Telephone Operator	Uncredited
1958	The High Cost of Loving	Miss Matthews, Cave's Secretary	Uncredited cameo
1959	Five Gates to Hell	Susette	
1961	The Parent Trap	Miss Grunecker	
1961	The Last Time I Saw Archie	Miss Willoughby	Uncredited
1961	The Two Little Bears	Emily Wilkins	
1962	Moon Pilot	Space Flight Nutritionist	Uncredited
1963	Who's Minding the Store?	Emily Rothgraber	
1964	The Patsy	Helen, Theatergoer	
1965	Strange Bedfellows	Aggressive Woman	
1966	The Night of the Grizzly	Wilhelmina Peterson	
1970	The Aristocats	Frou-Frou	Voice

=== Television ===
Year	Title	Role	Episode(s)
1954	Lux Video Theatre	Daisy	"To Each His Own"
1954	Topper	Guest	"The Seance"
1954	December Bride	Louella	"Lily Hires a Maid"
1955–1959	The Bob Cummings Show	Pamela Livingstone	15 episodes
1955	It's a Great Life	Mrs. Bell	"The Missing Stamp"
1955	The Life of Riley	Charlotte Lindsay	"Love Comes to Waldo Binney"
1955	Svengali and the Blonde	Honorine	TV movie
1955	Schlitz Playhouse	Guest	2 episodes
1955	Topper	Mrs. Bandle	"The Neighbors"
1955	TV Reader's Digest	Ruth	"Around the Horn to Matrimony"
1955	Schlitz Playhouse	Guest	"The Girl Who Scared Men Off"
1955	The Life of Riley	Charlotte Lindsay	"Waldo's Mother"
1955	It's a Great Life	Gloria	"The Crystal Ball"
1955	General Electric Theater	Miss Lamb	"The Seeds of Hate"
1956	It's a Great Life	Anastasia	"Beauty Contest"
1956	I Love Lucy	Maid	"Lucy Meets the Queen"
1956	Navy Log	Guest	"Web Feet"
1956	It's a Great Life	Girl	"Kid Sister"
1956	The Jane Wyman Show	Guest	"Shoot the Moon"
1956	December Bride	Florence	"Lily the Matchmaker"
1956	Cheyenne	Waitress	"Johnny Bravo"
1956	The Gale Storm Show	Helga Petersen	"Passenger Incognito"
1956	Our Miss Brooks	Lucretia Hannibal	Recurring (3 episodes)
1956	The 20th Century Fox Hour	Miss Gillis	"The Hefferan Family"
1956	The Red Skelton Show	Witch	"The Magic Shoes"
1956	The Adventures of Ozzie and Harriet	Nancy	"The Balloons"
1956	Alfred Hitchcock Presents	Nurse	Season 2 Episode 10: "Jonathan" (credited but does not appear)
1957	Date with the Angels	Dolly Cates	Recurring (4 episodes)
1957	The Thin Man	Desk clerk, uncredited cameo	"The Angel Biz"
1958	The Loretta Young Show	Helen	"Dear Milkman"
1958	Perry Mason	Sarah Winslow	"The Case of the Prodigal Parent"
1958	Cheyenne	Waitress, uncredited	"Noose at Noon"
1958	Colgate Theatre	Aggie	"Adventures of a Model"
1958	Colgate Theatre	Stella Morgan, credited as Nancy Culp	"The Fountain of Youth
1958	The Real McCoys	Harriet Reynolds	"The Dancin' Fool"
1958	77 Sunset Strip	Landlady	"Casualty"
1959	Westinghouse Desilu Playhouse	Miss Hirsch	"Symbol of Authority"
1959	December Bride	Librarian	"The Hi-Fi Show"
1959	Playhouse 90	Leona	"A Marriage of Strangers"
1959	Perry Mason	Katherine Collins	"The Case of the Deadly Toy"
1959	The Dennis O'Keefe Show	Miss Mansfield	"Teacher's Pest"
1959	Maverick	Waitress, uncredited	"Full House"
1959	Sunday Showcase	Girl at Well	"The Milton Berle Special"
1959	U.S. Marshal	Eve Lang	"Toy Bull"
1960	Bourbon Street Beat	Emma St. John	"Kill with Kindness"
1960	The Gale Storm Show	Gertrude	"Captain Courageous"
1960	The Comedy Spot	Guest	"Adventures of a Model"
1961	Shirley Temple's Storybook	Guardian	"The Little Mermaid"
1961	Mister Ed	Martha	"Pine Lake Lodge"
1961	Pete and Gladys	Miss Hotchkiss	"Gladys' Political Campaign"
1961	The Jack Benny Program	Elocution Teacher	"Don's 27th Anniversary with Jack"
1962	Outlaws	Jennifer Veasy	"The Dark Sunrise of Griff Kincaid"
1962	Pete and Gladys	Vickie	"Office Wife"
1962	87th Precinct	Miss Fitzhenry	"Killer's Choice"
1962	The Twilight Zone	Agnes Gann	"The Fugitive"
1962	The Danny Thomas Show	Mrs. Keltner	"The P.T.A. Bash"
1962	The Joey Bishop Show	Guest	"A Man's Best Friend"
1962	My Three Sons	Miss Harris	"Robbie Valentino"
1962	General Electric Theater	Miss Lamb	"The Free Wheelers"
1962	My Three Sons	Miss Fisher	"The Big Game"
1962	The Jack Benny Program	Jeanette	"Alexander Hamilton Show"
1962	King of Diamonds	Sergeant Vadolski	"Backlash"
1962	Hawaiian Eye	Edie Barnes	"'V' is for Victim"
1962	The Comedy Spot	Woman	"The Soft Touch"
1962	Ernestine	Woman	Made-for-TV movie.
1962	The Lucy Show	Jane Corey	"Lucy Becomes an Astronaut"
1962–71	The Beverly Hillbillies	Jane Hathaway	246 episodes
1963	77 Sunset Strip	Eloise	"The Checkmate Caper"
1966	Password	Herself	Game show contestant / Celebrity guest star
1968	Petticoat Junction	Jane Hathaway	"A Cake from Granny"
1971	Rowan & Martin's Laugh-In	Guest	"Ver-r-r-ry Interesting"
1973–74	The Brian Keith Show	Mrs. Gruber	Recurring (8 episodes)
1975–76	Sanford and Son	May Hopkins	Recurring (5 episodes)
1978	The Love Boat	Gert	"Mike and Ike / The Witness / The Kissing Bandi"
1979	CHiPs	Herself, uncredited	"Roller Disco: Part 2"
1979	The Love Boat	Sylvia McTigue	"Spider Serenade, The / Next Door Wife / Harder They Fall"
1981	The Love Boat	Aunt Gert	"Tony and Julie / Separate Beds / America's Sweetheart"
1981	Return of the Beverly Hillbillies	Jane Hathaway	Made-for-TV movie directed by Robert M. Leeds.
1983	The Wilder Summer	Camp Director	Made-for-TV movie directed by Deborah Reinisch.
1983	Fantasy Island	Mrs. Potroy	"Revenge of the Forgotten / Charo"
1986	Simon & Simon	Shirley Graham	"Still Phil After All These Years"
1986	Scarecrow and Mrs. King	Dr. Claudia Joyce	"Billy's Lost Weekend"
1989	Quantum Leap	Sister Sarah	Episode: "The Right Hand of God" (S 1:Ep 4)
1989	ABC Afterschool Special	Aurora	"Private Affairs", final appearance

== Theatre ==
Year	Title	Role	Venue	Notes
1980–81	Morning's at Seven	Aaronetta Gibbs	Lyceum Theatre (April 10, 1980 – August 16, 1981)	Replacement for Elizabeth Wilson.; Directed by Vivian Matalon, written by Paul Osborn, and produced by Elizabeth I. McCann, Nelle Nugent & Ray Larsen.

== Awards and nominations ==
List of acting awards and nominations
Year	Award	Category	Title	Role	Result	Ref.
1967	Primetime Emmy Award	Outstanding Supporting Actress in a Comedy Series	The Beverly Hillbillies	Jane Hathaway	Nominated	

== Discography ==
- Jerome Kern: Show Boat, conducted by John McGlinn, EMI, 1988
