= Mr. Ed's Barn =

Historic barn in Chatsworth, California, United States

- Harvester Farms
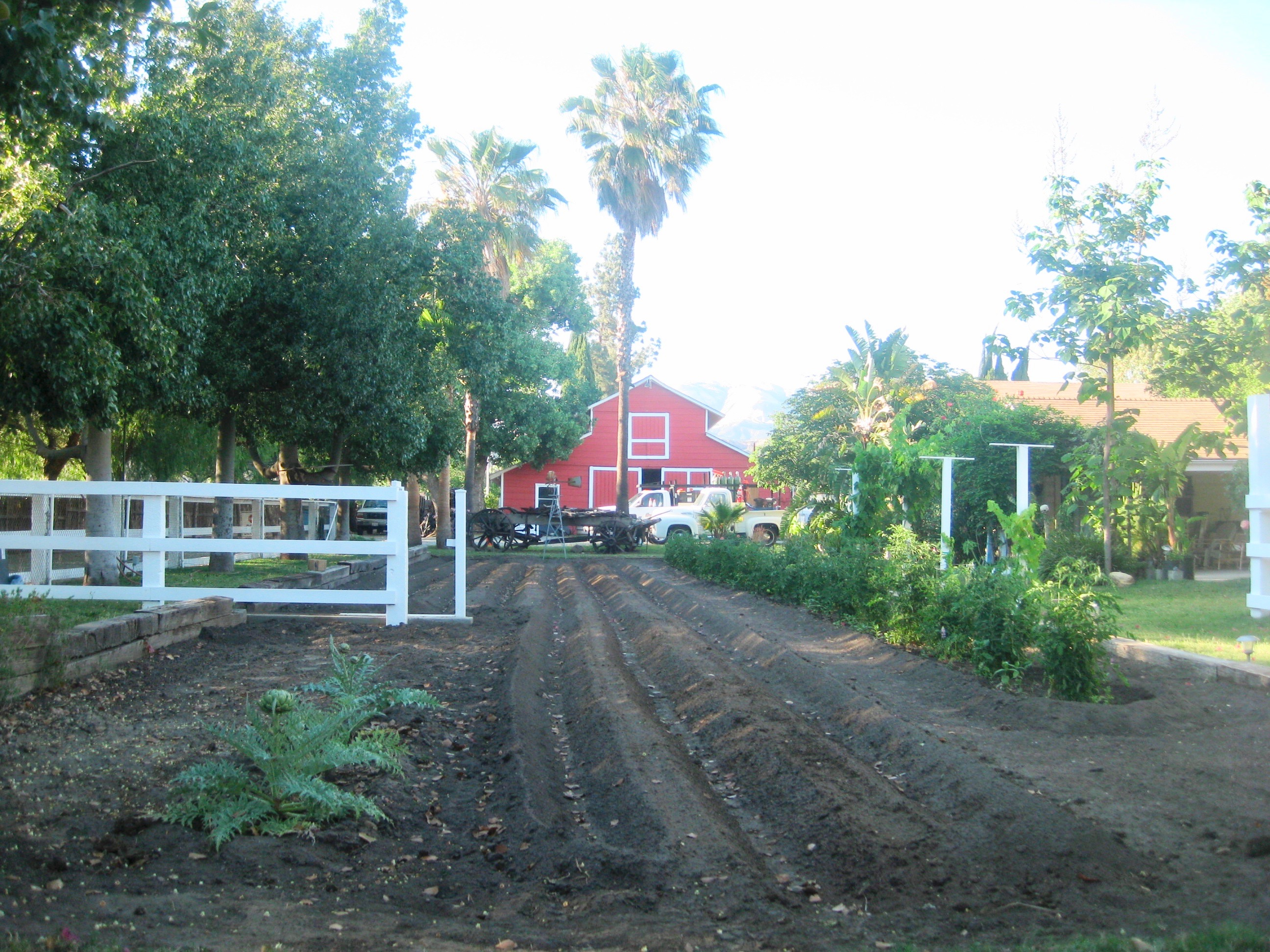
- Mr. Ed's Barn in May 2013

General information
- Architectural style: Original redwood barn
- Location: 22049 Devonshire Street, Chatsworth, California, United States
- Estimated completion: 1923

Technical details
- Material: Redwood

Design and construction
- Designations: Los Angeles Historic-Cultural Monument No. 645
- Known for: Mister Ed's father, Harvester died in the barn.

Mr. Ed's Barn is a redwood barn in Chatsworth, California that was home to Mister Ed, the "talking" horse from the 1960's television sitcom of the same name, during his first years of life. It is Los Angeles Historic-Cultural Monument No. 645.

== History ==
Known as Harvester Farms, Mr. Ed's Barn is named after Mister Ed's father, Harvester, a golden palomino, who died in the barn in 1963. The redwood barn is two stories and comprises a hay loft, stables, and ranch hand living quarters. It was the original headquarters of the Palomino Horse Association of America.

In 1996, a subdivision of 18 homes on Harvester Farms property was approved, which threatened to condemn the barn. A letter-writing campaign was launched, and in March 1997, Harvester Farms was declared Los Angeles Historic-Cultural Monument No. 645.

== In media ==
- Huell Howser visited Mr. Ed's Barn. on an episode of Visiting...with Huell Howser in 2003.

== Gallery ==
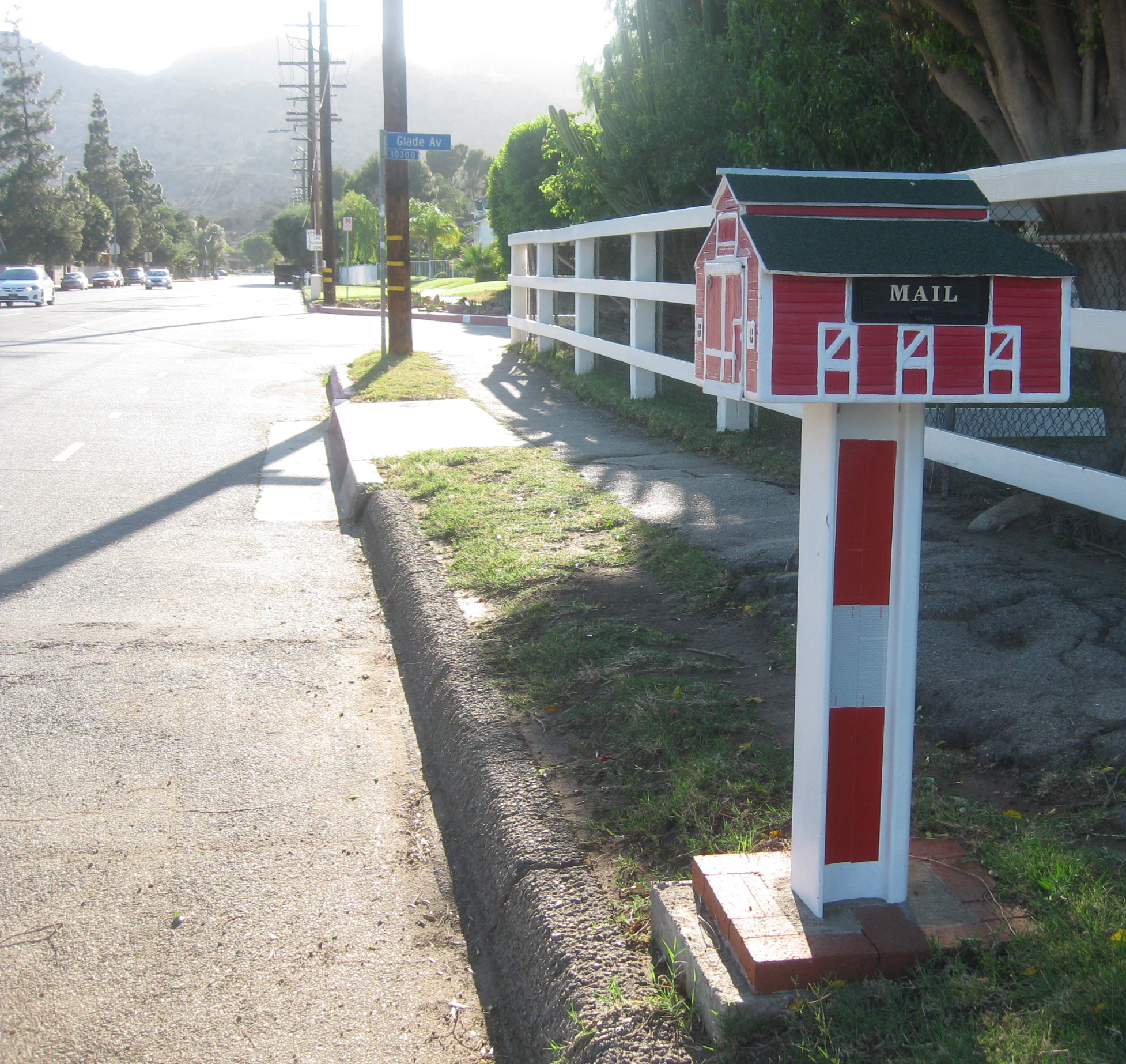
The Mr. Ed's Barn mailbox.
