= Flight (TV series) =

American television anthology series

- Directed by: Jules Bricken (1 ep); Maurice Geraghty (1 ep); Gerry Morton (1 ep); Val Raset (1 ep); Boris Sagal (1 ep); Jean Yarbrough (33 ep)
- Original language: English
- No. of seasons: 1
- No. of episodes: 38

Production
- Executive producer: Al Simon
- Producer: Robert Stillman
- Cinematography: McCadden Productions
- Running time: 24 mins.
- Production company: California National Productions

Original release
- Network: Syndication
- Release: November 4, 1958 – March 25, 1959

Flight is an American television anthology series that originally aired in syndication from 1958 to 1959. The series originally aired for one season, with 38 half-hour episodes produced. It was created with the assistance of the United States Air Force and featured retired General George C. Kenney as the host and opening narrator.

== Guest stars ==
Star	Role	Episode title	Notes	Ref.
John Agar	Guest	"Vertijet"	Ep 32	
Forrest Compton	Capt. Fleischer	"Chopper Four"; "Three Men"; "The Chaplin Story"; "Survival"	Ep 33; Ep 34; Ep 36; Ep 37	
Mason Alan Dinehart	Guest	"Skyfighters"; "Three Men"; "The Chaplin Story"; "Survival"	Ep 14; Ep 34; Ep 36; Ep 37	
James Drury	Guest	"Window in the Sky"	Ep 11	
Louise Fletcher	Carol	"Red China Rescue"	Ep 7	
Robert Fuller	Guest	"Outpost in Space"	Ep 38	
Peter Hansen	Kovacs	"Flight Surgeon"	Ep 4	
Richard Jaeckel	Guest	"Parachute Jump"	Ep 1–Pilot	
Tom Laughlin	Guest	"The Hard Way"	Ep 9	
John Pickard	Guest	"Operation Angel"; "Three Men"; "The Chaplin Story"; "Survival"	Ep 24; Ep 34; Ep 36; Ep 37	
Burt Reynolds	Capt. Sam Allen; Capt. Jack Hilyard	"Master Sergeant"; "Eye for Victory"	Ep 21; Ep 29	
Marshall Thompson	Guest	"The Chaplin Story"; "Survival"	Ep 36; Ep 37	
Lyle Talbot	Guest	"Submarine Patrol"	Ep 25	

== Episodes ==
No.	Title	Directed by	Written by	Original release date
1	"Parachute Jump"	Maurice Geraghty	Douglas Morrow	November 4, 1958
2	"Typhoon Chasers"	Jean Yarbrough	Leonard Heideman	1958
3	"Experiment Oxygen"	Jean Yarbrough	Leonard Heideman	1958
4	"Flight Surgeon"	Jean Yarbrough	John Meredyth Lucas	1958
5	"Escape"	Jean Yarbrough	Douglas Morrow	1958
6	"Sky Hook"	Jean Yarbrough	Robert C. Dennis	1958
7	"Red China Rescue"	Jean Yarbrough	Leonard Heideman	1958
8	"Bombs in the Belfry"	Jean Yarbrough	Leonard Heideman & John Kneubuhl	1958
9	"The Hard Way"	Jean Yarbrough	Tony Barrett	1958
10	"The Dart"	Jean Yarbrough	Harold Swanton	1958
11	"Window in the Sky"	Jean Yarbrough	Fenton Earnshaw	1958
12	"The Derelict"	Jean Yarbrough	Arthur Browne Jr.	1958
13	"The Minefield"	Jean Yarbrough	Ellis Marcus	1958
14	"Skyfighters"	Jean Yarbrough	Leonard Heideman	1958
15	"Crash Investigation"	Jean Yarbrough	John Meredyth Lucas	1958
16	"Havana Run"	Jean Yarbrough	Les Farber & Maria Fagyas	1958
17	"Final Approach"	Jean Yarbrough	John Meredyth Lucas	1958
18	"Texas Fliers"	Jean Yarbrough	Burt Sims	1958
19	"Japanese Code"	Jean Yarbrough	Leonard Heideman	1958
20	"Flight Plan"	Jean Yarbrough	Richard M. Powell	1958
21	"Master Sergeant"	Jean Yarbrough	Douglas Morrow	1958
22	"The Snark"	Jean Yarbrough	Leonard Heideman	1958
23	"Border Incident"	Jean Yarbrough	Tony Barrett	1958
24	"Operation Angel"	Jean Yarbrough	Tony Barrett	1958
25	"Submarine Patrol"	Jean Yarbrough	Leonard Heideman	1958
26	"Decision"	Jean Yarbrough	Leonard Heideman & Jack Laird	1958
27	"Destination Normandy"	Jean Yarbrough	John Hawkins	1958
28	"Story of a General"	Jean Yarbrough	Thomson Burtis	1959
29	"Eye for Victory"	Jean Yarbrough	Fenton Earnshaw	1959
30	"Enemy Agent"	Jean Yarbrough	Douglas Morrow	1959
31	"Show of Force"	Jean Yarbrough	Leonard Heideman	1959
32	"Vertijet"	Gerry Morton	Story by : Robert Hinkle; Teleplay by : Vance Skarstedt	1959
33	"Chopper Four"	Jean Yarbrough	Story by : Capt. James H. Brown; Teleplay by : Jack Laird	1959
34	"Three Men"	Jean Yarbrough	Leonard Heideman	1959
35	"Mercy Commando"	Jean Yarbrough	Jack Laird	1959
36	"The Chaplin Story"	Jules Bricken	Russell S. Hughes & Leonard Heideman	1959
37	"Survival"	Val Raset	Leonard Heideman	1959
38	"Outpost in Space"	Boris Sagal	Antony Ellis	March 25, 1959
