= The Second Greatest Sex =

1955 film by George Marshall

- Theatrical release poster
- Directed by: George Marshall
- Written by: Charles Hoffman
- Based on: Lysistrata; 411 B.C. by Aristophanes
- Produced by: Albert J. Cohen
- Starring: Jeanne Crain
- Cinematography: Wilfred M. Cline
- Edited by: Frank Gross
- Music by: Henry Mancini
- Distributed by: Universal Pictures
- Release date: October 1955
- Running time: 87 mins.
- Country: United States
- Language: English
- Box office: $1.4 million (US)

The Second Greatest Sex is a 1955 American western musical comedy film directed by George Marshall and starring Jeanne Crain and George Nader. It is a Western version of the play Lysistrata by Aristophanes.

== Plot ==
In 1880, men from three Kansas towns, Osake, Jones City and Mandaroon - feud over which one gets to be the county seat. A safe containing important documents is the prize which, whoever controls it, will determine the county seat.

To the frustration of the women back home, the men go away for long periods of time to fight over this safe, and then return home exhausted. Matt Davis wants to marry Sheriff McClure's attractive daughter Liza, but neither McClure is sure if Matt's more interested in the town or romance.

The men of Osake, now have the safe, and proceed to build a courthouse in their town. However, Liza is livid when, just as they marry, Matt leaves again because the safe's now been stolen. He forms a posse and the other men take off with him. Taking their cue from the play Lysistrata by Aristophanes, all of the women, including young Birdie and spinster Cassie, decide to join Liza in going "on strike" against the men, holing up in a fort and locking them out. The men must prove they are worthy before the women will agree to take them back.

Meanwhile, the safe is once again captured by the men of Osake, but sinks in the river. The women, thinking the "war" is over, decide to go back with the men, but change their minds when the men say they just have to wait for the water to go down in order to retrieve the safe once more.

With the women back in their fort, the men are upset, despondent, but determined to act. Job McClure (Bert Lahr) then sings the title song "The Second Greatest Sex". Now that the water level is lower, the men once more go after the sunken safe, but find that another town is already at the site, with the safe in their hands. A fist-fight then ensues between the men from all three towns. In the ensuing ruckus, the safe is knocked off the wagon and goes rolling down the hill to sink in a pool of quicksand.

All the men, from all three towns, now rush back home to their women, only to find the women of Mandaroon, and Jones City, have all vanished. Turns out, they are, as well, all holed up in the same fort. The women now force the men to truce, and to choose a completely new spot for the county seat.

== Cast ==
- Jeanne Crain as Liza McClure (singing voice was dubbed by Doreen Tryden)
- George Nader as Matt Davis (singing voice was dubbed by Bill Lee)
- Kitty Kallen as Katy Conors
- Bert Lahr as Job McClure
- Mamie Van Doren as Birdie Snyder
- Keith Andes as Rev. Peter Maxwell
- Kathleen Case as Tilda Bean
- Paul Gilbert as Roscoe Dobbs
- Tommy Rall as Alf Connors
- George D. Wallace as Simon Clegghorn
- Edna Skinner as Cassie Slater
- Jimmy Boyd as Newt McClure
- Sheb Wooley as Silas

== Songs ==
- "What Good Is a Woman Without a Man?" (Jeanne Crain and female cast)
- "Travelin' Man" (Paul Gilbert)
- "My Love Is Yours"
- "There's Gonna Be a Wedding"
- "How Lonely Can I Get?"
- "Send Us a Miracle"
- "Lysistrata"
- "The Second Greatest Sex" (Bert Lahr)

== See also ==
- List of American films of 1955
- Lysistrata
