= Bamboo Harvester =

Horse that portrayed Mister Ed (1949–70)

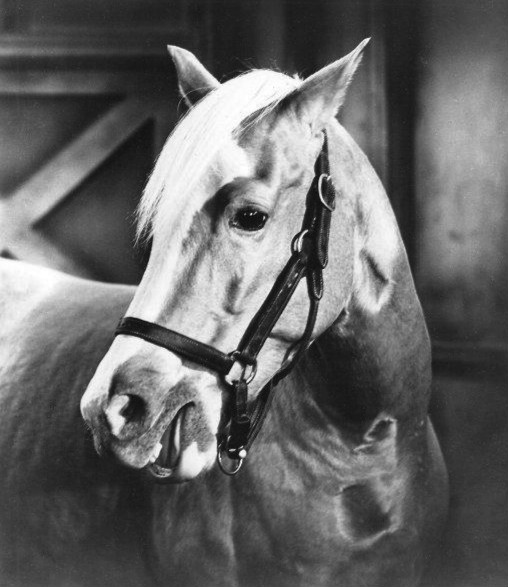
- Bamboo Harvester as Mister Ed
- Other name: Mister Ed
- Breed: American Saddlebred/part-Arabian
- Born: Bamboo Harvester; 1949
- Died: 1970 (aged 20–21)
- Resting place: Snodgrass Farm Tahlequah, Oklahoma U.S.

Bamboo Harvester (1949–1970) was the American Saddlebred/part-Arabian horse that was known for portraying Mister Ed on the 1961–1966 comedy series of the same name. Foaled in 1949, the gelding was trained by Will Rogers' protégé, Les Hilton. He was born in the Los Angeles area but some sources disagree as to whether his birthplace was in Reseda, El Monte or at Harvester Farms in Chatsworth, California.

In 1968, two years after the cancellation of Mister Ed, at the age of 19, Bamboo began to suffer from a variety of age related ailments, including kidney problems and arthritis. He was euthanized in 1970.

A second palomino horse named Pumpkin (alternatively Punkin), which had posed for still pictures used in press kits for the show and some personal appearances, survived until 1979. After Bamboo Harvester's death, the second horse was unofficially known as Mister Ed.

== Pedigree ==
Pedigree of Bamboo Harvester "Mister Ed"
Sire The Harvester American Saddlebred (Born 1938)	Revel's Cream of Wheat (Born 1932)	Rey El Moreno (Born 1924)	Solano (Born 1916)
Sire The Harvester American Saddlebred (Born 1938)	Revel's Cream of Wheat (Born 1932)	Rey El Moreno (Born 1924)	Lois Hardy (Born 1917)
Sire The Harvester American Saddlebred (Born 1938)	Revel's Cream of Wheat (Born 1932)	Highland Squirrel King's Lady (Born 1921)	Highland Squirrel King (Born 1899)
Sire The Harvester American Saddlebred (Born 1938)	Revel's Cream of Wheat (Born 1932)	Highland Squirrel King's Lady (Born 1921)	Queen (Born 1900)
Sire The Harvester American Saddlebred (Born 1938)	Red Dawn	Exclamation Rex Squirrel (Born 1922)	Forrest Rex (Born 1909)
Sire The Harvester American Saddlebred (Born 1938)	Red Dawn	Exclamation Rex Squirrel (Born 1922)	Emily Easton (Born 1917)
Sire The Harvester American Saddlebred (Born 1938)	Red Dawn	Unknown Mare	Unknown
Sire The Harvester American Saddlebred (Born 1938)	Red Dawn	Unknown Mare	Unknown
Dam Zetna Hara Part-Arab (Born 1945)	Antez (Arabian) (Born 1921)	Harara (Born 1912)	Deyr (Born 1904)
Dam Zetna Hara Part-Arab (Born 1945)	Antez (Arabian) (Born 1921)	Harara (Born 1912)	Haffia (Born January 1906)
Dam Zetna Hara Part-Arab (Born 1945)	Antez (Arabian) (Born 1921)	Moliah (Born 1911)	Hamrah (Born 1904)
Dam Zetna Hara Part-Arab (Born 1945)	Antez (Arabian) (Born 1921)	Moliah (Born 1911)	Wadduda (Born 1899)
Dam Zetna Hara Part-Arab (Born 1945)	Koricha (breed unknown) (Born 1935)	Unknown	Unknown
Dam Zetna Hara Part-Arab (Born 1945)	Koricha (breed unknown) (Born 1935)	Unknown	Unknown
Dam Zetna Hara Part-Arab (Born 1945)	Koricha (breed unknown) (Born 1935)	Unknown	Unknown
Dam Zetna Hara Part-Arab (Born 1945)	Koricha (breed unknown) (Born 1935)	Unknown	Unknown

== Death ==
By 1968, Bamboo Harvester was suffering from a variety of health problems. Controversy surrounds the story of his demise, and there are at least two separate versions of what happened, both from plausible sources which might reasonably be expected to have the correct story.

In one version, he was euthanized in 1979 with no publicity, and buried at Snodgrass Farm in Oklahoma. However, a different version was given by Alan Young. Young wrote that he had frequently visited his former co-star in retirement. He states that in 1970 Bamboo Harvester died from an inadvertent tranquilizer administered while he was "in retirement" in a stable in Burbank, California, where he lived with his trainer, Lester Hilton.

Young says Hilton was out of town visiting relatives and a temporary caregiver might have seen Harvester rolling on the ground, struggling to get up. Young said Harvester was a heavy horse and he was not always strong enough to get back on his feet without struggling. The theory is that the caregiver thought the horse was in distress and administered a tranquilizer and for unknown reasons the horse died within hours. The remains were cremated and scattered by Hilton in the Los Angeles area at a spot known only to him.

In this version it was a different horse that died in Oklahoma in February 1979 which was widely thought to be Bamboo Harvester, but instead this horse was merely one that posed for the still pictures of "Mr. Ed" used by the production company for the show's press kits and also who starred as Harvester's stablemate during the show's run. After Bamboo Harvester's death in 1970, this horse was unofficially known as Mister Ed, which led to him being reported as such (including sardonic comments on Saturday Night Live's Weekend Update) following his own death.

Young said when the Oklahoma horse death story came out in 1979, he knew it was not the real Bamboo Harvester, but did not have the heart to "shatter their illusions" that the horse being memorialized was not the real Mister Ed. He believed it was a horse used for early publicity photos.

Whether or not it was the real Bamboo Harvester, the horse was laid to rest in 1979, on the farm at Snodgrass Farm in Tahlequah, Oklahoma, with no marker. It wasn't until summer 1990 when Mister Ed fans of Oklahoma dedicated a standing granite gravestone to honor the grounds of his grave, though the epitaph uses his stage name and image as 'Mister Ed', and does not mention his death date of 1970.

== See also ==
- List of historical horses
