= Caro Jones =

American actress (1923–2009)

Caro Jones (1923 – September 3, 2009) was a Canadian-American actress and casting director who was responsible for casting more than 1,000 films, theater productions and television shows over the course of more than forty years, including Rocky, The Beverly Hillbillies and Green Acres.

== Biography ==
=== Early life and career ===
Jones was born in Canada. When she was 18 years old, Jones moved to New York City and was hired as a singer by the musical, Oklahoma's touring company. She next became a casting assistant to the Theatre Guild's main casting director. She was quickly promoted to head casting director within the Theatre Guild, and began casting for live television as well. One of Jones' first assistants was Les Moonves, who was the president of the CBS television network.

Jones married her first husband, fellow singer Arthur Eiseman, while living in New York City. The couple had one son, Jack. Their son, Jack, became an actor and singer, appearing in the original Broadway production of Oliver!.

=== Television and film ===
Despite her move to television and film later in her career, Jones remained involved with the Theatre Guild in New York City. Her last major job with the Guild involved casting for the 1996 Broadway production and touring company of State Fair.

Caro Jones became involved in television very early on in the medium's history after initially beginning her casting career in theater. Jones cast for The United States Steel Hour, a live anthology series produced by the Theatre Guild in New York which ran from 1953 to 1963 on ABC and CBS, where she cast actors such as Patty Duke, Sidney Pollack, Gene Hackman, William Shatner, Burgess Meredith, Johnny Carson, Martin Sheen and George C. Scott.

==== Paramount ====
Jones relocated to Los Angeles to continue her career in television, and later film. She was soon hired to oversee casting for Paramount Television, where she cast for series including Paper Moon, Love, American Style, Mannix and the pilot episode of the Robin Hood: Men in Tights television series with Mel Brooks. (The pilot later became a 1993 Brooks film).

==== Filmways Television ====
Jones left Paramount and took a position as a casting director with Filmways Television. There she was in charge of casting for the television series Petticoat Junction, The Beverly Hillbillies, Green Acres and The Debbie Reynolds Show. She also cast for the films What's the Matter with Helen? and Fuzz for Filmways. She met and married her second husband, Al Simon, a producer for Filmways Television, while working for the company. She remained at Filmways for five years.

==== Independent casting ====
Upon her departure from Filmways Television after five years, Jones launched her own casting agency. Her first casting job under the banner of her own company was for the 1976 John Avildsen film, Rocky, which starred Sylvester Stallone. Jones had previously collaborated with Avildsen for his 1973 film, Save the Tiger, starring Jack Lemmon. Rocky would win the Academy Award for best picture as well as for best director.

Jones' notable film credits under her own company included The Karate Kid in 1984 and Back to School in 1986. Jones' other miniseries credits included The Martian Chronicles, which starred Rock Hudson in 1980, and the 1981 miniseries, Jacqueline Bouvier Kennedy, which starred Jaclyn Smith as Jacqueline Kennedy Onassis.

== Awards and professional organizations ==
Caro Jones was honored with the Artios Award from the Casting Society of America for her professional work. She was also awarded the Hoyt Bowers Award in 1994 by the Casting Society of America as well.

A collection of her production notebooks and scripts, called the Caro Jones Collection of Scripts and Production Notebooks, is housed at the Margaret Herrick Library of the Academy of Motion Pictures Arts & Sciences in Beverly Hills.

She was a founding member of the Casting Society of America and of Women in Film. Jones was a Governor of the Academy of Television Arts and Sciences and a member of the Academy of Motion Picture Arts & Sciences, the Screen Actors Guild, Actor's Equity and the American Federation of Television and Radio Artists.

== Death ==
Caro Jones died on September 3, 2009, of multiple myeloma in Los Angeles at the age of 86 after suffering from the disease for fourteen-years. She was survived by two grandchildren, Jacqueline and Chase Eiseman, her brother, William Jones and two nieces, Caro Norris and Penelope Swanson. She was buried at Forest Lawn Memorial Park, Glendale.
