= Edna Skinner =

American actress (1921–2003)

- Publicity Photo of Edna Skinner
- Born: May 23, 1921; Washington, D.C., U.S.
- Died: August 8, 2003 (aged 82); North Bend, Oregon, U.S.
- Occupation: Actress
- Years active: 1948–1964

Edna Skinner (May 23, 1921 – August 8, 2003) was an American film and television actress.

== Biography ==
Edna born in 1921, grew up in Fulton, New York, and got her industry start starring in local theatre plays.

Skinner was notable for playing Kay Addison, neighbor of Wilbur Post, in the iconic TV series Mister Ed. Her character was replaced months after her onscreen husband (Larry Keating) died; according to Alan Young in his Archive of American Television interview, the writers tried to make her a widow on the show, but finally decided to bring in another married couple, Gordon and Winnie Kirkwood, played by Leon Ames and Florence MacMichael, and Edna Skinner had to leave the show.

Skinner left the acting industry in 1964 and was later a noted authority on fly fishing. She died of heart failure at her home in North Bend, Oregon on August 8, 2003, at the age of 82.

== Filmography ==
Film
Year	Title	Role	Notes
1948	The Kissing Bandit	Juanita	
1953	Easy to Love	Nancy Parmel	
1953	The Long, Long Trailer	Maude Barrett	Uncredited
1955	The Second Greatest Sex	Cassie Slater	
1956	Friendly Persuasion	Opal Hudspeth	
1957	Footsteps in the Night	Saleslady	Uncredited
Television
Year	Title	Role	Notes
1954–1955	Topper	Maggie	Unknown episodes
1955	Soldiers of Fortune	Wilma Joyce	1 episode
1955	The Millionaire	Jane Palmer	1 episode
1956	Jane Wyman Presents The Fireside Theatre	Eva	1 episode
1961–1964	Mister Ed	Kay Addison	69 episodes
1964	The Beverly Hillbillies	Mrs. Wright	1 episode
1964	Daniel Boone	Sadie Clayburn	1 episode, (final appearance)
