= List of Mister Ed episodes =

Mister Ed is an American situation comedy (sitcom) television (TV) series about a horse named Mister Ed who talks to one man, Wilbur Post who bought the property where he lives. It was produced by Filmways in the United States from 1961 to 1966. It first aired in syndication from January 5, 1961, to July 2, 1961, and then aired on CBS from October 1, 1961, to February 6, 1966. There were 143 episodes over six seasons. The December 10, 1961 episode was pre-empted by a telecast of the 1939 film, The Wizard of Oz.

All six seasons of Mister Ed were released on VHS videotape. They were re-released on DVD in the U.S. in 2014. The series has aired on over-the-air TV, cable television, and the Internet at various times since 2000.

Note: The episodes are listed in order of production, writing and completion, so might not be when each one was broadcast on TV.

== Series overview ==
Season	Episodes	Originally released		
Season	Episodes	First released	Last released	Network
1	26	January 5, 1961	July 2, 1961	Syndication
2	26	October 1, 1961	April 29, 1962	CBS
3	26	September 27, 1962	May 12, 1963	CBS
4	26	September 29, 1963	May 17, 1964	CBS
5	26	October 4, 1964	June 16, 1965	CBS
6	13	September 12, 1965	February 6, 1966	CBS

== Episodes ==
=== Season 1 (1961) ===
No. overall	No. in season	Title	Directed by	Written by	Original release date
1	1	"The First Meeting"	Rod Amateau	William Burns, Irving Elinson, Robert O'Brien & Phil Shuken	January 5, 1961
Newlyweds Wilbur and Carol Post move into their first house together, and find that the previous tenant left his horse behind in the backyard barn. Carol insists on selling the animal, but Wilbur wants to keep it. To his surprise, the horse agrees with him. Howard Wendell appears as a real estate agent.
2	2	"The Ventriloquist"	Rod Amateau	Lou Derman & Phil Davis	January 12, 1961
Roger Addison hears Mister Ed and Wilbur talking to each other. He now believes that Wilbur is a great ventriloquist. Having lost numerous bets to their mutual friend Hal (Peter Leeds), Roger bets Hal that Wilbur can throw his voice. Mr. Ed comes to the rescue. Meanwhile, Carol is trying to get Wilbur to buy a TV set for the bedroom.
3	3	"Busy Wife"	Justus Addiss	Lou Derman & Ben Starr	January 19, 1961
Kay gets Carol involved with a woman's club. She is so busy with the club, she gets Wilbur to do all her chores for her. Wilbur decides to take up painting as a hobby. His real plan is to make Carol jealous when he brings in Jane Parker (Donna Douglas) to model for him.
4	4	"Kiddy Park"	Arthur Lubin	Lou Derman & Ben Starr	January 26, 1961
Ed feels neglected on his birthday because Wilbur is leaving him at a stable, while he goes on a 3-day fishing trip to Mexico. Ed decides to run away and join a Kiddy Park, where he gives rides to children. Wilbur finds Ed and agrees to take him with to Mexico. James Flavin appears as the stable owner. Bobby Buntrock from the TV show Hazel appears as the boy riding Mr. Ed. Note: Mr. Ed talks to Wilbur in front of the boy riding him because, as he says, "Who believes kids, anyway?"
5	5	"Stable for Three"	Arthur Lubin	Lou Derman & Ben Starr	February 2, 1961
Mr. Ed devours all the vegetables in Carol's garden. When Carol finds out, she banishes Wilbur to the barn. Kay and Roger have an argument over a mink that she bought, and Roger leaves to spend the night with Wilbur. Mr. Ed tries to get everyone together by pretending to be a burglar.
6	6	"Sorority House"	Arthur Lubin	Lou Derman & Ben Starr	February 9, 1961
Wilbur lends a local fraternity Mr. Ed to be their mascot. Ed is stolen by a rival fraternity house and hidden in a sorority house basement. Wilbur then dresses as a woman to get Ed out. Norma Varden appears as Mrs. Davis, the sorority house mother.
7	7	"Ed the Lover"	Arthur Lubin	Lou Derman & Ben Starr	February 16, 1961
Carol believes Mr. Ed should go to work in a western movie that Wilbur's client Fred Briggs (Les Tremayne) is directing. Wilbur and Mr. Ed are against it. Because of this, marital strife boils over in both the Post and Addison households. To keep the peace, Ed relents. Mr. Ed causes problems on the set until he learns that a filly horse has fallen in love with him.
8	8	"The Pageant Show"	Arthur Lubin	Lou Derman & Ben Starr	February 23, 1961
Carol and Kay attempt to get their husbands to participate in the upcoming Pageant Parade. They finally agree. Wilbur hopes to ride Ed in the parade. Mr. Ed refuses because Wilbur removed Ed's phone from the barn. When Ed realizes how much it means to Carol, he agrees. Note: This is the first episode where the theme song is sung.
9	9	"The Aunt"	Arthur Lubin	Lou Derman & Ben Starr	March 2, 1961
Wilbur is all set to enjoy a week's vacation relaxing at home, but his plans are ruined when his overbearing Aunt Martha (Eleanor Audley) and her talking parrot unexpectedly drop by for a prolonged visit. Tootsie the parrot gets to stay in the barn and it's driving Ed crazy. Ed hides the bird, but when he finds out how much the bird means to Aunt Martha, he brings her back.
10	10	"The Missing Statue"	Arthur Lubin	Lou Derman & Ben Starr	March 9, 1961
Mister Ed is phoning in racing tips to the Pimlico Racetrack for his niece to help her with her first race. Carol buys a $50 statue she wants for the house. Wilbur insists they need to keep spending down. Between the Post's and the Addison's, the statue is repeatedly bought and returned, hidden and found. Gage Clarke appears as the antique store owner.
11	11	"Ed the Witness"	Arthur Lubin	Lou Derman & Ben Starr	March 16, 1961
While lost in Mexico, the Post's and Addison's stop in a small town. As they are having lunch someone hits Wilbur's trailer and damages the wheel. It turns out that Arturo (Natividad Vacío), the repairman, is the one who caused the damage. Mr. Ed is the only witness. When Wilbur refuses to pay, he is put in jail. Ed helps Wilbur win his case.
12	12	"Ed's Mother"	Arthur Lubin	Lou Derman & Ben Starr	March 23, 1961
Mister Ed's mother is being used as a plow horse, so he begs Wilbur to buy her at auction. Carol is dead set against taking in another horse, and Roger is dead set against Kay spending any of his money at the auction. Ed, pretending to be Wilbur's business manager, buys his mother and brings her to the barn. Carol finds out and Ed's mother is sent back. Wilbur buys her again at the auction, promising Carol he will find her a good home.
13	13	"Ed the Tout"	Arthur Lubin	Lou Derman & Ben Starr	March 30, 1961
After Ed starts giving Wilbur nothing but winning picks at the race track, everyone wants to get in on the gravy train - including Carol and Kay's milk fund for the school kids. But once Ed finds out that Wilbur wants to actually place bets on them, he refuses to give Wilbur the winners. Ed overhears Carol and Kay talk about how the milk fund could really have used the money and decides to give Wilbur the winners only for one day. At the track, they win the first six races. But, Ed's pick for the seventh race is dropped. Roger looks at Wilbur's paper and gets everyone to bet on a horse that Wilbur picked and which Ed said could never win.
14	14	"Ed the Songwriter"	Arthur Lubin	Lou Derman & Ben Starr	April 6, 1961
Ed writes a song for Kay's brother in law, Paul Fenton, an eccentric music producer who is in need of a hit. Of course, Wilbur must pretend that he wrote the song and not Ed. Paul calls Wilbur and wants to hear the lyrics sung. Wilbur says he'll have a friend (Ed) sing because he has a better voice. But things hit a snag when Paul wants Wilbur's friend (Ed) to sing the song for the recording. Note: First of several appearances by Jack Albertson as Kay Addison's brother (or brother in law) Paul.
15	15	"Ed the Stoolpigeon"	Arthur Lubin	Lou Derman & Ben Starr	April 13, 1961
Carol rescues a poodle named Pierre and Ed gets so jealous that he tries to get the pup in trouble. Ed calls the police and reports the dog's barking waking people up at night. Wilbur believes it was Roger who called. Wilbur explains to Ed that Pierre will be taken back to the pound and probably be there forever. Ed tells Wilbur he was the one that called and that he's sorry. Ralph Sanford appears as the policeman.
16	16	"Psychoanalyst Show"	Arthur Lubin	Lou Derman & Ben Starr	April 20, 1961
Wilbur pretends to be a patient and sees a psychiatrist (Richard Deacon) to find out how to help Mr. Ed overcome his fear of heights.
17	17	"A Man for Velma"	Arthur Lubin	Lou Derman & Ben Starr	April 27, 1961
Carol has sprained her wrist, so Wilbur hires Velma (Elvia Allman), a fantastic cook. She even serves carrot pizzas to Ed. Velma gets ready to leave because her week is up. Ed calls her on the phone and pretends to be a local secret admirer so she will stay longer. With Ed's help, Velma's old boyfriend Henry (Don Brodie) shows up and proposes to her.
18	18	"Ed's New Shoes"	Arthur Lubin	Lou Derman & Ben Starr	May 4, 1961
Wilbur hires a bumbling handyman (John Qualen) to fix up the house in anticipation of a visit from Home Beautiful Magazine, and Ed wants new shoes to impress a filly. James Flavin appears as Mr. Kramer, the stable owner.
19	19	"Little Boy"	Arthur Lubin	Lou Derman & Ben Starr	May 11, 1961
Margaret (Virginia Christine) and her son Peter are new to the block and Peter is having trouble fitting in. Carol gives a party for the unpopular youngster. Mister Ed comes up with a plan to help him win friends.
20	20	"Ed Agrees to Talk"	Arthur Lubin	Lou Derman & Ben Starr	May 16, 1961
When Wilbur balks at buying a new car for Carol, she hitches up a buggy to Mister Ed. Ed then reports her to the SPCA. Mrs. Adams (Doris Packer) from the SPCA comes by. She sees Ed laying on the floor and refusing to eat. She says she will be back with a warrant to take Ed away. To make things OK, when she comes back, Ed is on his feet and friendly to Carol. Wilbur does buy Carol a car.
21	21	"The Mustache"	Arthur Lubin	Lou Derman & Ben Starr	May 21, 1961
Roger convinces Wilbur to grow a mustache to look older in order to land a promising architect position he wants. Carol insists that he shave it off, because Wilbur is starting to act like Roger. Meanwhile, Ed wants Wilbur to install a shower in the barn. Wilbur tells Ed that he will get a shower when Wilbur shaves off his mustache. To keep the peace with Carol, Wilbur shaves, but he has to make Ed think he still has it.
22	22	"The Other Woman"	Arthur Lubin	Lou Derman & Ben Starr	June 4, 1961
To Carol's shock, Wilbur whispers the name of another woman in his sleep. After being mad and upset, she is relieved to learn that the name he mentioned was a female horse that Ed wanted him to buy for the barn. Tom Fadden appears as Charley Woods, the owner of the female horse.
23	23	"Ed Cries Wolf"	Arthur Lubin	Lou Derman & Ben Starr	June 11, 1961
Wilbur buys a pair of pearl earrings as a surprise for Carol on her birthday, but a home burglar has other plans for them. Ed is lonely, so he makes up all these stories to keep Wilbur in the barn. Because of that, Wilbur is reluctant to believe Ed when he sees the burglar in the house. Ed manages to foil the burglary. Rolfe Sedan appears as Pierre, the Jeweler. Anthony Warde appears as the policeman.
24	24	"The Contest"	Arthur Lubin	Lou Derman & Ben Starr	June 18, 1961
Mister Ed wins $100 in Wilbur's name when he correctly answers a contest question over the telephone. Wilbur now has a chance to win $5000, but he's going to need Ed's help. Ed makes Wilbur lose so the prize can go to an elderly couple. Lyle Talbot appears as the man running the contest.
25	25	"Pine Lake Lodge"	John Rich	Lou Derman & Bill Davenport	June 25, 1961
In this back door pilot for a proposed TV series, Mister Ed protests when Wilbur and Carol go to Pine Lake Lodge upstate for a weekend vacation. The friendly but troublesome lodge owner Bill Parker (guest star William Bendix) cons Wilbur into helping him cut down a tree to help build furniture for a summer camp the lodge is planning to hold for the summer. The pine tree sits on the property of a stuffy businessman (Will Wright). Complications set in, leading to misunderstandings and a guilt-ridden Bill trying to cover it up. Nancy Kulp appears as Martha, Bill's assistant at the lodge. Coleen Gray appears as Ann, Bill's niece.
26	26	"Wilbur Sells Ed"	Arthur Lubin	Lou Derman & Ben Starr	July 2, 1961
Mister Ed falls in love with a filly owned by an important builder named Fred Gilbert (Frank Wilcox). Ed convinces Wilbur to give him to the builder in order to be closer to her. Once with Mr. Gilbert, Ed learns that the filly is being sold to someone in South America. Ed comes back to Wilbur and Mr. Gilbert is ok with that.

=== Season 2 (1961–62) ===
No. overall	No. in season	Title	Directed by	Written by	Original release date
27	1	"My Son, My Son"	Arthur Lubin	Lou Derman & Bill Crewson	October 1, 1961
Ed's having paternal feelings, so he talks Wilbur into adopting a little pony as a son for him. But, after Snuffy the pony eats up all of Roger's prize apples, Wilbur says he has to go back. Mr. Ogilvie (Jack Mather) from the stable comes to pick Snuffy up. He informs Wilbur that Snuffy is actually a Shetland pony that is 23 years old.
28	2	"The Horsetronaut"	Arthur Lubin	Lou Derman & Bobby O'Brien	October 8, 1961
In order to appease Mr. Mencken (Francis De Sales), a potential new client, Wilbur takes an office downtown. Ed now feels unwanted and attempts to become the first horse astronaut into space. Ed goes to the space center and passes the intelligence test. The day of the flight, Wilbur rushes to the space center, but the rocket is just taking off. Mr. Ed shows up and tells Wilbur they picked another horse at the last minute because Ed was too heavy. Hazel Shermet appears as Miss Culbertson, Wilbur's secretary at the new office.
29	3	"Ed's Ancestors"	Arthur Lubin	Lou Derman & Bill Crewson	October 15, 1961
Carol wants Ed to be the model for an historic statue. But, through Roger's trickery, Ed believes that he has a shameful heritage, so he runs away from home.
30	4	"Ed the Redecorator"	Arthur Lubin	Lou Derman & Bill Crewson	October 22, 1961
Carol wants to redecorate the house in Hawaiian Modern motif, but Ed insists that his barn gets a makeover also. Wilbur does not want to do either as it will cost too much. While the Wilbur and Carol go to Palm Springs for a few days, Ed gets the barn done. This could be big trouble for Wilbur if Carol sees it. Hayden Rorke guest stars as Mr. Cavell, the decorator.
31	5	"Ed, the Jumper"	Arthur Lubin	Lou Derman & Bill Crewson	October 29, 1961
Wilbur bets old college rival Karl Dickinson (Alan Hale Jr.) "5 bills" that Ed can out-jump his horse. He has second thoughts after he realizes that "5 bills" equals $500. Ed manages to talk Karl's horse into not jumping. Donna Douglas appears as Karl's wife.
32	6	"Ed the Voter"	Arthur Lubin	Lou Derman	November 5, 1961
Carol and Wilbur convert the barn into a temporary polling precinct, so Ed wants to vote, too. Roger believes he might be perfect for a future run for office. Thomas Browne Henry appears as Mr. Sawyer from the County Registrars Office. Charles Meredith appears as The Mayor.
33	7	"Hunting Show"	Arthur Lubin	Lou Derman & Stanley Adams	November 12, 1961
The wives horn in on Wilbur and Roger's duck hunting trip. Ed doesn't want to go along because his horoscope says if he goes something bad will happen. The wives bring all the comforts of home even though the boys wanted to rough it. Ed pretends to be shot, hoping Wilbur will take him home.
34	8	"Mister Ed's Blues"	Arthur Lubin	Lou Derman & Bill Crewson	November 19, 1961
Roger's brother-in-law Paul (Jack Albertson) is begging Wilbur to write a follow-up hit song to "Pretty Little Filly". He wants it to be a blues number, so Wilbur does his best to get Ed in a depressed mood. But, it isn't until Ed's girlfriend Sabrina dumps him for another horse, that he feels he can write the blues. The song is called "The Empty Feedbag Blues".
35	9	"Ed the Hero"	Arthur Lubin	Lou Derman & Stanley Adams	November 26, 1961
Ed saves the life of a little girl named Betsy (Shari Lee Bernath) who was on a runaway horse. Her millionaire grandfather Henry J. Thorndyke (Addison Richards) is so grateful he invites Ed and the Posts to his Catalina estate. Thorndyke wants to put Ed in a parade for all the children of the island. Ed refuses to get on a boat, because of his fear of water. When Roger and Wilbur rent another horse to take instead, Ed changes his mind about the trip. Eddie Quillan appears as a photographer who has come to take Ed's picture for the papers.
36	10	"Ed the Salesman"	Arthur Lubin	Lou Derman & Bill Crewson	December 3, 1961
Carol's constant chattering has rung up a huge phone bill, so she takes a job as a dance instructor to help cover the charges. Ed gets in on the act by taking a job selling real estate over the telephone so he can buy a color TV that Wilbur won't buy for him. Carol finds that being a dance instructor is much more tiring than she thought, but she can't let Wilbur know. In the end, Wilbur asks Carol to quit her job.
37	11	"Ed and the Elephant"	Arthur Lubin	Lou Derman & Robert O'Brien	December 17, 1961
Wilbur promises a magician (Henry Corden) that he will take care of his elephant for a few days, and Ed's not too thrilled with the idea. Meanwhile, Kay brings home one wrong dog too many, so Roger moves into a motel.
38	12	"The Wrestler"	Arthur Lubin	Lou Derman & Bill Crewson	January 7, 1962
Carol and Kay want to take up ballet. Wilbur and Addison are supposed to manage a wrestler named Tiger Davis (Ricky Starr). The problem is that, instead of training, all Tiger winds up doing is eating. To help him lose weight, the girls get him to do ballet with them and he's better at that than wrestling.
39	13	"Ed's Bed"	Ira Stewart	Lou Derman & Bill Crewson	January 14, 1962
Ed feels sick with a cold so he wants Wilbur to nurse him and orders a bed for the barn while he recovers. Carol is upset with Wilbur because he pampers Ed more than her.
40	14	"Ed the Beneficiary"	Arthur Lubin	Lou Derman & Robert O'Brien	January 21, 1962
Ed pesters Wilbur to have a will drawn up after he reads of a cat inheriting a large sum from her deceased owner. Carol worries about Wilbur's health when she accidentally learns of the will. Roger gets a Dr. Reynolds to pretend to be a golf pro and try to give Wilbur a partial exam while giving him a golf lesson. Raymond Bailey appears as a lawyer.
41	15	"Zsa Zsa"	Arthur Lubin	Lou Derman & Bill Crewson	January 28, 1962
A noisy new neighbor turns out to be Zsa Zsa Gabor. A producer named Jack Brady (Berry Kroeger) wants Zsa Zsa to film a western but she is fearful of horses. Ed helps her overcome her fear of horses and she would like to take Ed to Australia to make the film. Brady offers Wilbur $5000 for Ed, but Wilbur refuses. Ed doesn't want Wilbur to lose out on the money, so he tells him he wants to go. When Zsa Zsa realizes how much Wilbur will miss Ed, she says she can use another horse.
42	16	"Horse Wash"	Arthur Lubin	Lou Derman & Stanley Adams	February 4, 1962
Carol's dad comes to visit for the first time, and Ed has a hot date, so he visits the local car wash to get a good shower. Ed and Wilbur help to prevent Carol's father from making a bad business deal. Herb Vigran appears as Joe Burke, manager of the car wash. Note: First appearance of Barry Kelley as Wilbur's antagonistic father-in-law, Mr. Higgins.
43	17	"Ed the Horse Doctor"	Arthur Lubin	Lou Derman & Robert O'Brien	February 11, 1962
Ed comes to the rescue of Lady Linda, a race horse purchased by Addison who is lovesick and will not run. He then finds himself in over his head when the horse sets her eyes on him. Hank Patterson appears as Dr. Evans the Veterinarian. Robert Carson appears as Whitey Morgan, Lady Linda's trainer.
44	18	"George Burns Meets Mister Ed" "(Ed Finally Talks)"	Arthur Lubin	Lou Derman	February 18, 1962
George Burns is offering $25,000 for a great new novelty act, so Wilbur begs Mister Ed to talk to Mr. Burns.
45	19	"Ed's Word of Honor"	Arthur Lubin	Lou Derman & Stanley Adams	February 25, 1962
It's Roger's birthday, and the Post's give him a fish pond. Roger accuses Ed of first, eating the apples off his tree and then eating the fish from his pond. Ed gives his word of honor he didn't eat the fish. Wilbur doesn't believe Ed. Roger finds out it was cats that ate his fish, so he goes and apologizes to Wilbur. Wilbur in turn, must apologize to Ed.
46	20	"No Horses Allowed"	Arthur Lubin	Lou Derman & Bill Crewson	March 4, 1962
Wilbur enters into a televised debate against a respected member of the community named Harvey Ainsworth (Neil Hamilton), who wants to ban horses from the neighborhood. Ainsworth changes his mind about the petition when Ed finds a lost Boy Scout (Teddy Eccles) that Ainsworth was in charge of.
47	21	"Bald Horse"	Arthur Lubin	Lou Derman & Bill Crewson	March 18, 1962
Roger wants to get out of having to take a trip to San Francisco with Kay and The Posts, so he tricks Wilbur into believing that Mister Ed is suddenly going bald, which in turn makes Ed a nervous wreck. Percy Helton appears as Dr. Evans the veterinarian.
48	22	"Ed's New Neighbors"	Arthur Lubin	Lou Derman & Stanley Adams	March 25, 1962
Kay inherits property in New York, so Roger enters into an agreement to sell their California home and move. The purchasers (Willard Waterman & Shirley Mitchell) insist on having quiet neighbors. They also have an incorrigible child, so Ed decides he would rather take Addison over them. When Roger changes his mind about the move, Wilbur schemes to get rid of the couple.
49	23	"Ed, the Beachcomber"	Arthur Lubin	Lou Derman & Robert O'Brien	April 1, 1962
Mister Ed is suffering from feelings of rejection, so he moves to the beach to live with a group of outcast beatniks. Roger owns the beach property, and he wants to evict the whole lot of them.
50	24	"Lie Detector"	Arthur Lubin	Lou Derman & Larry Rhine	April 8, 1962
Roger brings home an inventor-friend's homemade lie detector, and he hooks it up to Wilbur, who later hooks it up to Ed and the truth brings unwanted problems for all.
51	25	"Clint Eastwood Meets Mister Ed"	Arthur Lubin	Lou Derman & Sonia Chernus	April 22, 1962
Clint Eastwood moves into the neighborhood with a horse that steals all of Ed's fillies. Ed sets up a party line with Clint's house, which causes nothing but problems for Mr. Eastwood. Meanwhile, the wives volunteer Wilbur and Roger to put on a play for charity, which Clint helps with. Kathleen Freeman appears as Clint's maid. Donna Douglas appears as Clint's girlfriend.
52	26	"Ed the Matchmaker"	Arthur Lubin	Ben Starr & Robert O'Brien	April 29, 1962
Emmy Lou Harper (Joanna Dix) is the teenage daughter of the Post's new neighbors who gets them involved by asking Wilbur for a locket of hair from Ed's tail to make a love potion. But complications threaten to end the romance between Emmy Lou and her potential new boyfriend, Arthur, before it even begins, until Mister Ed decides to secretly step in to help the two teens get together. George O'Hanlon appears as Mr. Harper. Jeff Donnell appears as Mrs. Harper. Note: Back-door pilot for a proposed series to be called Emmy Lou, based on the Marty Links comic strip character.

=== Season 3 (1962–63) ===
No. overall	No. in season	Title	Directed by	Written by	Original release date
53	1	"Ed Gets Amnesia"	Arthur Lubin	Ben Starr & Robert O'Brien	September 27, 1962
Ed gets accidentally hit in the head with a bucket of carrots and he cannot remember Wilbur or who he is. Wilbur pretends to have amnesia in hopes the doctor will tell him how to get cured and then apply that to Ed. Richard Deacon appears as Dr. Baker the veterinarian. C. Lindsay Workman appears as Dr. Cathcart.
54	2	"Wilbur the Good Samaritan"	Arthur Lubin	Ben Starr & Robert O'Brien	October 4, 1962
Mister Ed's telephone complaint in Wilbur's name gets the neighborhood newspaper boy Joey (Kevin Brodie) fired. Wilbur and Addison suspect each other of being the one who did it. So Wilbur and Ed must now go to great lengths to get the kid's job back for him. Jerry Hausner appears as Mr. Hunt, the man who fires Joey.
55	3	"Wilbur and Ed in Showbiz"	Arthur Lubin	Ben Starr & Robert O'Brien	October 11, 1962
Wilbur and Ed decide to break into show business after they see Margie the Elephant perform on TV. After seeing all the tricks that Ed can do, Margie becomes depressed. Ed, wanting to help Margie regain her confidence, botches his big TV debut. Chick Chandler appears as Mr. Hodges, Margie's trainer.
56	4	"The Bashful Clipper"	Arthur Lubin	Ben Starr & Robert O'Brien	October 18, 1962
Carol and Kay discover that Chuck (Ricky Starr), the guy that clips Ed's hair, is also a fantastic hairdresser, so they convince Wilbur and Roger to make an investment that enables him to open his very own salon. One problem they hadn't counted on: He's too shy around women to cut their hair. When Chuck runs out on his first customer, Wilbur fills in. With Chuck's back to him, Ed, speaking as Chuck's conscience, convinces him to get over his fear and return to the salon. Note: One of the few very rare episodes in which Mr. Ed intentionally speaks either directly or indirectly to someone other than Wilbur.
57	5	"Ed and the Allergy"	Arthur Lubin	Ben Starr & Robert O'Brien	October 25, 1962
Wilbur has promised to take Ed camping, but the visit of Addison's mother-in-law (Isabel Randolph) spoils that from happening. When Roger discovers she's allergic to horse hair, he hopes keeping Ed around will force her to leave. Mr. Ed finds out about Roger's plan and does what he can to spoil it. In doing so, Ed actually brings Roger and Kay's mother together. Lewis Martin appears as a doctor.
58	6	"Horse Sense"	Arthur Lubin	Ben Starr & Robert O'Brien	November 1, 1962
Roger writes a letter to the editor to get rid of the bridle path that runs along the local golf course because the horses interfere with his game. Wilbur writes a rebuttal, which Ed intercepts and rewrites. The editor likes the style of writing and offers Wilbur a book deal, which goes to his head. When Ed sees how disappointed Carol is in the new Wilbur, he decides to bring Wilbur down to earth. Gale Robbins appears as Miss Meed, a literary critic. Note (continuity goof): In the scene where the editor, Mr. Boyd (Neil Hamilton), phones Wilbur to ask him to write a book, he never identifies himself. Seconds later, Wilbur is referring to the editor as 'Mr. Boyd' by name.
59	7	"Wilbur in the Lion's Den"	Arthur Lubin	Ben Starr & Robert O'Brien	November 8, 1962
Wilbur turns down a high-paying job offer from a Mr. Foster (Charles Lane), because he wanted Wilbur to work night and day and weekends. Meanwhile, Ed wants Wilbur to take him kite flying. When Ed loses his kite, Wilbur winds up in a lion cage while trying to retrieve it.
60	8	"Horse Party"	Arthur Lubin	Lou Derman, Robert O'Brien, and Ben Starr	November 15, 1962
Ed tells Wilbur to throw him a birthday party and invite his horse friends at the same time Carol is planning a girls luncheon. Through some deception, Ed manages to get the luncheon moved. Wilbur throws Ed his party. When the women find out they've been deceived, Wilbur has some explaining to do.
61	9	"Ed the Pilgrim"	Arthur Lubin	Lou Derman, Robert O'Brien, and Ben Starr	November 22, 1962
Ed tells how a horse gets the real credit for the first Thanksgiving, in the hopes that Wilbur will include Ed in a family Thanksgiving. Iron Eyes Cody, Rodd Redwing and Eddie Little Sky appear as Native Americans in Ed's story. Grandon Rhodes and Frankie Darro appear as Pilgrims.
62	10	"Disappearing Horse"	Arthur Lubin	Lou Derman & Ben Starr	November 29, 1962
Carol tricks Wilbur into performing his magic act at the community theatre variety show, (after Wilbur and Roger agreed not to perform.) Wilbur needs a great trick, so he creates a disappearing horse trick, but things don't quite work out well.
63	11	"Ed and Paul Revere"	Arthur Lubin	Ben Starr & Robert O'Brien	December 6, 1962
Addison, being the Chairman and a distant relative from Paul Revere, hires a talented but egotistical sculptor named Igor Korzak (Hans Conried) to create a statue of Paul Revere for the town park. Roger wants to be the model, but Igor wants Wilbur and he really wants Ed for the horse. Wilbur tells Igor that he can only have Ed if he uses Roger. When unveiled, the statue is an abstract and a shock when everyone sees it.
64	12	"Wilbur the Masher"	Arthur Lubin	Ben Starr & Robert O'Brien	December 13, 1962
While riding in the park, Wilbur gets into trouble with Betty Gordon (Coleen Gray), a married woman. Ed keeps whistling at the woman's horse and Betty thinks it's Wilbur that's doing it. Wilbur must convince Carol, and Betty's husband (Paul Langton), he is not a masher. Ed helps by phoning Betty while the Posts are at the Gordon's house.
65	13	"Horse of a Different Color"	Arthur Lubin	Robert O'Brien, Ben Starr, and Lou Derman	December 20, 1962
Roger leases some of his land to the Armstrong (Hugh Sanders) circus, hoping to make a lot of money. Ed sneaks out to see the circus and decides he wants to join. Ed volunteers to fill in for a circus horse that jumps through fire. Ed changes his mind when Wilbur says he will get another horse if Ed leaves.
66	14	"Ed and the Bicycle"	Arthur Lubin	Lou Derman & Robert O'Brien	January 3, 1963
Ed refuses to apologize to Wilbur for causing him to get a ticket at the park, so Wilbur starts riding a bicycle to get even. Ed retaliates against Wilbur for riding a bike instead of him and flattens the bike tires so Wilbur is caught walking home in the rain.
67	15	"Ol' Rockin' Chair"	Arthur Lubin	Lou Derman & Robert O'Brien	January 10, 1963
Wilbur constructs a rocking chair out of Ed's old shoes because he doesn't want to throw them out. After realizing how uncomfortable the chair is, Wilbur puts an ad in the paper to sell it. When Addison runs into a buyer willing to pay $200 for the chair, he schemes to make a profit by paying Wilbur $30 for the chair.
68	16	"Big Pine Lodge"	Arthur Lubin	Lou Derman & Robert O'Brien	January 17, 1963
The Posts, Addisons, and Ed all go to a ski lodge. During the trip the gambling addicted Addison falls victim and loses a lot of money to two card sharks. That is until Wilbur decides use Ed to try to help Addison out. Benny Rubin appears as the lodge desk clerk.
69	17	"Unemployment Show"	Arthur Lubin	Lou Derman & Robert O'Brien	January 24, 1963
Ed becomes unemployed after he works for a month at a riding stable owned by a Mr. Kramer (James Flavin). Meanwhile, Kay's lazy brother, Ralph Fenton (Richard Erdman), is a press agent out of work who drives Addison crazy due to his antics. Ralph and Mr. Ed's paths cross when Wilbur decides to help Ralph get publicity from Ed receiving an unemployment check. Willard Waterman appears as the Unemployment Office Manager. Note: As Ed raises his head after Wilbur awakens him by popping a paper bag, you can see a man's hand holding Ed's leg in the lower left side of the frame. Note: The social security number Ed gets (054-22-5457) actually belonged to the show's writer, Louis "Lou" Derman.
70	18	"Horse Talk"	Arthur Lubin	Lou Derman & Robert O'Brien	January 31, 1963
Wilbur and Ed help redeem a racetrack worker, Mr. McGivney (Chick Chandler) from horse doping charges by talking to the horse to find the real culprit (Anthony Warde). When the culprit shows up to drug Lady Sue, he catches Wilbur in the stall and holds him at gunpoint with the belief he had been following his trail. Ed comes to Wilbur's rescue by having the guard (Richard Reeves) overhear the ongoing conversation between the two men that leads to the doper's arrest.
71	19	"Ed and the Secret Service"	Justus Addiss	Ben Starr and Robert O'Brien	February 7, 1963
Carol and Kay try to persuade their husbands to join a hunt club to emulate the First Lady. Wilbur agrees to join, but Ed won't let Wilbur ride him in the hunt. In order to get Wilbur off the idea of the club, Ed places a telephone call to the White House to speak to the First Lady, which gets Wilbur a visit from two Secret Service men (Bob Hastings & Robert Patten).
72	20	"Working Wives"	Ira Stewart	Lou Derman & Robert O'Brien	February 14, 1963
Carol and Kay want to go to the movies, but Ed wants to go for a midnight ride. Ed hypnotizes Wilbur so he can't go to the movies. The wives feel that their husbands are taking them for granted, so they both get jobs. This leaves Wilbur and Roger at home to fend for themselves.
73	21	"Wilbur's Father"	Arthur Lubin	Ben Starr & Robert O'Brien	February 28, 1963
Wilbur's 70-year-old father is engaged to be married to Emma Hoblock (Doris Packer). Wilbur, Carol, and the Addisons are all under the false impression that his bride-to-be is fifty years younger, because they meet Emma's daughter Penny (Eilene Janssen) first. To teach Wilbur a lesson, his father has Penny play along. Note: Alan Young has a dual role as Wilbur and his Scottish father Angus Post..
74	22	"The Price of Apples"	Arthur Lubin	Lou Derman & Robert O'Brien	March 7, 1963
Ed has an uncontrollable urge for Addison's apples and constantly takes them from Addison's apple tree. Addison gets very angry at Ed and threatens Wilbur to stop Ed, or there will be legal trouble. Wilbur takes Ed to an animal psychiatrist (Richard Deacon) to cure his "apple-holic" problem.
75	23	"Ed the Zebra"	Arthur Lubin	Lou Derman & Robert O'Brien	March 21, 1963
Wilbur needs Rogers help to meet the famous builder, Henry Tyler (Frank Wilcox). To return the favor, Roger wants to dress up Ed in a suit, so he can shoot a photo of him to enter in a photography contest. Ed does not want to participate, but Wilbur makes him take the pictures anyway. Feeling that the contest is undignified, Ed runs away to a zoo as a zebra.
76	24	"Ed the Emancipator"	Arthur Lubin	Lou Derman & Robert O'Brien	March 24, 1963
The Posts buy Kay a cockatoo for her birthday. Ed gets it into his head to liberate the bird and it promptly begins to terrorize Roger. After Wilbur captures the bird and returns it to the bird farm, Ed decides to free the entire shelter in the style of Abe Lincoln. Ed brings all the birds to Roger's house and when Roger comes home, he believes he is seeing things.
77	25	"Doctor Ed"	Arthur Lubin	Lou Derman & Robert O'Brien	March 31, 1963
Addison's TV set stops working and Wilbur lends him his from the barn. Ed gets upset because he won't be able to watch his favorite doctor shows and there is a dream sequence where Dr. Ed refuses to operate on Addison.
78	26	"The Blessed Event"	Arthur Lubin	Ben Starr & Robert O'Brien	May 12, 1963
Joy hits Ed when he learns that he is about to become an Uncle. When he hears of this news, he goes straight to the typewriter and starts to list a bunch of names suitable to fit the little guy. Chaos ensues when Roger Addison finds the list and mistakenly assumes that Carol is pregnant, and soon Wilbur thinks vice versa of Addison's wife Kay. Richard Deacon appears as the veterinarian.

=== Season 4 (1963–64) ===
No. overall	No. in season	Title	Directed by	Written by	Original release date
79	1	"Leo Durocher Meets Mister Ed"	Arthur Lubin	Lou Derman & Michael Fessier	September 29, 1963
Hardcore Los Angeles Dodgers fan Ed calls team manager Leo Durocher to give him tips. Wilbur and Ed then go to Dodger Stadium to help Durocher, resulting in Ed hitting an inside-the-park home run pitched by Sandy Koufax. Notes: Series regular Larry Keating (Roger Addison) died of leukemia on August 26, 1963, during production of this episode. The character of Kay Addison continued for several episodes but was eventually phased out. In 1997 TV Guide ranked this episode No. 73 on its "100 Greatest Episodes of All Time" list.
80	2	"Wilbur Post, Honorary Horse"	Arthur Lubin	Lou Derman & Larry Rhine	October 6, 1963
Addison wants Wilbur to come up with a design for a building that he wants to build, but he can't agree to a fee for Wilbur. Ed let's Wilbur interview him to come up with ideas for a horse book. Because Wilbur is spending so much time on his book, Roger insists he work from Roger's den. Ed keeps pestering Wilbur and gets Wilbur in trouble again with Roger. Wilbur finally says he's an architect and not a book writer and finishes Roger's design.
81	3	"Ed Discovers America"	Arthur Lubin	Lou Derman & Larry Rhine	October 13, 1963
Wilbur has been chosen by the Mayor's office as the architect to create, plan, and construct the American History Museum. Of course, Mister Ed feels that the plan should include a statue of a horse in front of the museum. Ed goes on to tell Wilbur how a horse actually discovered America.
82	4	"Patter of Little Hooves"	Arthur Lubin	Lou Derman & Larry Rhine	October 20, 1963
Ed enters Wilbur in a newspaper puzzle contest and Wilbur ends up winning a miniature horse which Ed adopts as his own son. The little fellow promptly eats Roger's prized roses. Leo Fuchs appears as Mr. Rasmussen, the near sighted man from the Animal Regulation Bureau. Note: This is the last episode aired with Larry Keating as Roger Addison.
83	5	"Be Kind to Humans"	Arthur Lubin	Lou Derman & Larry Rhine	October 27, 1963
Wilbur and Ed come across several hobos while in the park, with Ed deciding to invite them to have dinner while Carol's father (Barry Kelley) is visiting. Kay E. Kuter, Stanley Adams & Frank J. Scannell play the hobos.
84	6	"Don't Laugh at Horses"	Ira Stewart	Lou Derman & Larry Rhine	November 3, 1963
Ed resents Wilbur and Kay's brother Paul (Jack Albertson) dressing as a two-man horse for a costume party, so Ed says that Wilbur can't ride him. Wilbur decides he will show Ed by renting a horse to ride. Ed finds out and gets all the horses in the area to go on strike. When Ed sees how much the neighborhood kids like Wilbur and Paul's act, he changes his mind. Joe Conley appears as Joe of the Animal Training School. Butch Patrick appears as neighbor boy Tommy.
85	7	"Getting Ed's Goat"	Arthur Lubin	Lou Derman & Larry Rhine	November 10, 1963
Ed has adopted a wild goat kid and decides to give it to Wilbur as a birthday present. The goat makes a pest of himself by eating Wilbur's latest house designs for a Mr. Benson (Robert Carson). When Wilbur threatens to send the goat to an animal shelter, Ed says he will go as well. After a day, Wilbur feels bad and brings the two of them home. Wilbur finds the goat a job in the circus.
86	8	"Oh, Those Hats!"	Arthur Lubin	Lou Derman & Bill Davenport	November 17, 1963
The Kiddie Zoo is losing public support, and Ed wants Wilbur to do something about it. Wilbur is hired by fashion editor Karen Dooley (Spring Byington) to design her beach house. Carol asks Miss Dooley to host a fashion show that will be on TV. Ed gets a bunch of the zoo animals to carry signs asking for help during the show.
87	9	"Taller Than She"	Arthur Lubin	Lou Derman & Bill Davenport	December 1, 1963
Ed is attracted to a British filly named Penelope, but she only dates horses that are taller than she is, so Ed wants Wilbur to provide him with elevated horse shoes. Henry Corden appears as the Blacksmith. Note: This episode is the last appearance of Edna Skinner as Kay Addison.
88	10	"Home Sweet Trailer"	Arthur Lubin	Lou Derman & Bill Davenport	December 8, 1963
Wilbur's former Air Force commander, Gordon Kirkwood (Leon Ames) and his wife Winnie (Florence MacMichael) come to town and park their trailer in the Post's back yard while they wait to settle on their new home next door. As the trailer is sitting there, Ed feels that his territory is being invaded. Note: In this episode, we meet Wilbur's new neighbors the Kirkwoods, replacing the husband/wife team of the Addisons. The Kirkwoods will remain the Posts' neighbors to the end of season 5.
89	11	"Love Thy New Neighbor"	Arthur Lubin	Lou Derman & Bill Davenport	December 15, 1963
Kirkwood officially buys the house next door, which causes Wilbur to go back to his old behavior of when Kirkwood commanded Post in the Air Force. This causes Wilbur to become overly helpful and just a pain in Gordon's neck. Ed is feeling mighty lonely with no one around to keep him company.
90	12	"Ed's Christmas Story"	Arthur Lubin	Lou Derman & Bill Davenport	December 22, 1963
Ed wants Wilbur to buy gifts for his horse friends. When Wilbur refuses, Ed tells him the story of how a horse was responsible for getting Santa Claus started in the gift-giving business. Meanwhile, Gordon talks Wilbur into entering a pact wherein they limit themselves to spending a mere $15 each on their wives. Ed goes ahead and buys the gifts for his horse friends. The boys stick to their $15 agreement, but the girls do not. When the girls find out about all the gifts in the barn, the boys have to go out and buy them something better. Gage Clarke appears as a jewelry salesman.
91	13	"Ed Gets the Mumps"	Arthur Lubin	Lou Derman & Larry Rhine	January 5, 1964
Ed pretends to have the mumps in order to compete for attention with a neighbors' baby who is attracting the attention of the Posts and Kirkwoods.
92	14	"Ed's Dentist"	Arthur Lubin	Lou Derman & Bill Davenport	January 12, 1964
Ed is complaining about a toothache. Wilbur tries to fix it by hiring the vet (Thomas Browne Henry) to come and take a look at Ed. When Ed sees the needle from the shot he is about to get, Ed disappears from the scene. Wilbur then takes Ed to a Dentist (George N. Neise). Meanwhile, Gordon may go crazy trying to prove that Wilbur is insane. Irwin Charone appears as an Army psychiatrist.
93	15	"Ed the Shish Kebab"	Arthur Lubin	Lou Derman & Stanley Adams	January 19, 1964
Wilbur travels to San Francisco for a magician's convention. He enters an illusion contest, using Mr. Ed as his assistant in a potentially dangerous trick, the "spears through the horse" trick. While there, Carol goes on a shopping spree with her friend Judy (Beverly Wills). Ed takes all the packages that Carol bought and hopes to use them as shields while in Wilbur's magic trick box. Peter Leeds appears a Marty Bixby, a friend of Wilbur's, who is also an amateur magician. Note: Harry Blackstone Sr. makes an appearance as a magician, as does the series' head-writer (and co-writer of this episode) Lou Derman.
94	16	"Ed in the Peace Corps"	Arthur Lubin	Lou Derman & Larry Rhine	February 2, 1964
Ed is frustrated when Wilbur hires Japanese exchange student Ako Tenaka (Miyoshi Umeki) as his secretary, as her constant presence prevents Ed from talking with Wilbur. Ed threatens to go to Pakistan to join the Peace Corps. Winnie is jealous because Ako is helping Gordon with his gardening. Carol's jealousy results in Ako's quitting.
95	17	"Ed the Desert Rat"	Ira Stewart	Story by : Lou Derman & Stanley Adams; Teleplay by : Lou Derman & Bill Davenport	February 16, 1964
When one of the neighbors installs a backyard swimming pool, Carol wants one, too, and Wilbur agrees to her demand, over Ed's objection. After a fight with Wilbur, Ed runs away for open spaces and ends up in the desert but Wilbur finds him. Chick Chandler appears as a pool installer. Butch Patrick appears as a boy that Ed actually talks to.
96	18	"Ed the Donkey"	Arthur Lubin	Lou Derman & Bill Davenport	February 23, 1964
After Ed is constantly called a jackass he begins to think he might be one. Ed insists that Wilbur take him to the vet to make sure that he is still a horse. All this running around is delaying a trip that the Posts and the Kirkwoods were going to take. George O. Petrie appears as the vet.
97	19	"Ed Visits a Gypsy"	Arthur Lubin	Lou Derman & Larry Rhine	March 1, 1964
Carol and Winnie go to Gypsy, where Winnie's palm is read. It says that Gordon treats her like a door mat. Ed wants Wilbur to take him to the Gypsy to get his hoof read. That way, he can find out if he will get together with a spirited filly whom he is in love with. Wilbur dresses up as the Gypsy to try and fool Ed, but it doesn't work. When he takes Ed to the Gypsy, she says the filly will treat him like a door mat. Belle Mitchell appears as the Gypsy.
98	20	"Ol' Swayback"	Arthur Lubin	Lou Derman & Bill Davenport	March 8, 1964
Ed becomes friends with Sam, an old swayback horse, whom everyone ridicules, and convinces Wilbur to let the horse stay with them. Meanwhile, Wilbur and Gordon have a fight when Wilbur accidentally breaks Gordon's model airplane. After Sam goes back to the circus, Ed brings home Harry the camel.
99	21	"Mae West Meets Mister Ed"	Arthur Lubin	Lou Derman & Bill Davenport	March 22, 1964
Ed overhears Mae West (in a rare TV appearance) commissioning Wilbur on creating deluxe stables for her horses. When Wilbur yells at Ed for his messy stall, Ed moves in with Mae. There he finds out the downside of getting what he wants.
100	22	"Ed the Chauffeur"	Arthur Lubin	Lou Derman & Larry Rhine	April 12, 1964
Gordon buys a new car and won't let Winnie drive it. Ed never knew he slept standing up, until Wilbur told him. Now that he knows, his feet hurt, and he wants Wilbur to buy him a car. Ed rents a truck and proceeds to drive it around town. Gordon lets Winnie drive the new car. She wrecks the car, claiming to see a horse driving.
101	23	"Ed the Musician"	Arthur Lubin	Lou Derman & Larry Rhine	April 19, 1964
Mister Ed is suffering from nightmares, so Wilbur goes to a psychiatrist (Richard Deacon) to see if he has any suggestions. Doctor Stekel suggests getting a hobby, possibly playing an instrument. So, Wilbur tells this to Ed. Ed becomes a one-horse-band. Note: This episode must have been filmed much earlier, because Edna Skinner as Kay Addison appears.
102	24	"The Prowler"	Arthur Lubin	Lou Derman & Bill Davenport	April 26, 1964
The Kirkwoods twice fall victim to a home burglar. Wilbur is sure he can crack the case. Ed is afraid the burglar will take him. They are pleasantly surprised when they catch the burglar. Hugh Sanders appears as Sgt. Meyers the detective.
103	25	"Saddles and Gowns"	Arthur Lubin	Lou Derman & Larry Rhine	May 3, 1964
Carol wants a new gown to wear to the Architect's Ball, and Ed wants a new saddle. Wilbur doesn't want to buy either. Ed orders the new saddle and now Ed and Wilbur have to hide it from Carol. She finds out and Wilbur has to buy the gown. Walter Reed appears as a fellow architect and horse owner who pampers his horse.
104	26	"Moko"	Arthur Lubin	Norman Paul & William Burns	May 17, 1964
Kirkwood plans a party for his strait-laced, former Commanding General Bromley (Robert Barrat). But problems arise when a little Martian causes Kirkwood to invite the beautiful actress Gloria Laverne (Joan Tabor). Moko the Martian then secretly crashes the party and turns the dull party into a swinging one. Notes: This episode was intended to be a plot for another spin-off TV series that never took off which was part-animation and part-live action featuring the adventures of the mischievous Martian Moko who possesses humans to act out various antics.

=== Season 5 (1964–65) ===
No. overall	No. in season	Title	Directed by	Written by	Original release date
105	1	"Hi-Fi Horse"	Arthur Lubin	Lou Derman & Larry Rhine	October 4, 1964
Carol doesn't appreciate the hi-fi set that Wilbur bought for their wedding anniversary, saying it is not a very personal gift. Carol goes home to mother, so Ed tries to cook for Wilbur. This, however, doesn't turn out well. Carol comes home soon after.
106	2	"Ed the Pool Player"	Arthur Lubin	Lou Derman & Larry Rhine	October 11, 1964
Winnie wants Gordon to get out of the house for a while. Wilbur takes him out to play pool. After Gordon is hustled out of $430 playing pool, it's up to Mister Ed to out-hustle "Chicago Chubby" (Thomas Gomez), the hustler.
107	3	"Ed Writes Dear Abby"	Arthur Lubin	Lou Derman & Larry Rhine	October 18, 1964
After Wilbur yells at him for partying all night, Ed writes to Dear Abby (Abigail Van Buren) wanting to know if he should have his own bachelor pad. Carol sees the letter and thinks Wilbur wants to leave. After Wilbur speaks to Dear Abby, he agrees to let Ed go, but Ed changes his mind.
108	4	"Ed's Tunnel to Freedom"	Arthur Lubin	Lou Derman & Larry Rhine	October 25, 1964
Gordon wants to borrow Ed to be in a parade. Ed has been stealing brownies and a pie from Carol's kitchen window. To teach Ed a lesson, Wilbur locks him in his stall so he cannot steal any more. Ed tries to tunnel his way out of the barn to be in the parade.
109	5	"The Heavy Rider"	Arthur Lubin	Lou Derman & Larry Rhine	December 30, 1964
Gordon recommends Wilbur to Mr. Banning, who wants to build a shopping center. Mr. Banning enjoys horse back riding. Ed gets stuck with having to give rides to him, but the only problem is he weighs 300 pounds. Ed tries several schemes to prevent Mr. Banning from riding him.
110	6	"Ed the Pilot"	Arthur Lubin	Lou Derman & Larry Rhine	January 6, 1965
Wilbur and Gordon decide to buy a plane and Ed wants to be the pilot. Wilbur fails a psychiatrist's (Harold Gould) test needed to buy the plane. Ed feels he has caused a riff between Wilbur and Gordon, so he steals a cargo plane hoping to fly to South America.
111	7	"Animal Jury"	Arthur Lubin	Lou Derman & Larry Rhine	January 13, 1965
Wilbur's Aunt Martha (Eleanor Audley) makes another visit with her pet parrot. Ed leaves the bird at the pet store and he must convince Wilbur that a cat drove the parrot there. Ed dreams he goes on trial for birdnapping in front of an animal jury. Byron Foulger appears as the pet store owner.
112	8	"What Kind of Foal am I?"	Arthur Lubin	Lou Derman & Larry Rhine	January 20, 1965
Carol's father (Barry Kelley) comes to visit and he's always thought Wilbur was a kook. As much as Wilbur tries to impress him, nothing goes right. Ed gets the idea to search for his father. Ed hires a detective (Hugh Sanders), who finds his father at a local carnival.
113	9	"Ed the Race Horse"	Arthur Lubin	Lou Derman & Larry Rhine	January 27, 1965
Kirkwood starts taking up horseback riding and he thinks his new horse is really fast, so he challenges Wilbur and Ed to a race. Ed goes into training after losing three races and has Wilbur buy him running sneakers. Wilbur challenges Gordon to one more race. Wilbur finds out that Gordon was cheating and taking a short-cut.
114	10	"Ed's Juice Stand"	Arthur Lubin	Lou Derman & Larry Rhine	February 3, 1965
Kirkwood, feeling old, tries to find a small business to invest in. Ed, also feeling old, creates a juice that is so invigorating and tasty that Wilbur wants to mass-produce and market it. However, Ed refuses to disclose the secret formula. Neil Hamilton appears as Mr. Robard, a potential investor in the juice. Note: Recycles footage from Season 2, Episode 24, "The Lie Detector".
115	11	"Like Father, Like Horse"	Arthur Lubin	Lou Derman & Larry Rhine	February 10, 1965
Gordon enters a bird seed slogan-writing contest in hopes of winning a free trip to Hawaii. Mister Ed decides to call him on the phone and have a little fun at Gordon's expense, telling him he won the contest. Just as Wilbur is trying to explain to Gordon that someone played a joke on him and he's not going to Hawaii, Mr. Crawford (George Barrows) of the bird seed company shows up to tell Gordon he won the contest.
116	12	"Ed the Stowaway"	Arthur Lubin	Lou Derman & Larry Rhine	February 17, 1965
The Posts and the Kirkwoods are on their way to a vacation together to Hawaii, Wibur smuggles Ed onto the ship and tells him to stay on the hold but Ed sneaks out and then sneaks into the bathroom of the suite that Wilbur and Carol are staying in and after he gets to the island, he doesn't want to return home. Wilbur gives Ed to the hotel owner, but when Carol says she will miss Ed, Wilbur has to find a way to get him back.
117	13	"Never Ride Horses"	Arthur Lubin	Lou Derman & Larry Rhine	February 24, 1965
Carol's father visits for the weekend and Ed gets Wilbur into trouble again when he decides to start a campaign to protest that people should not ride horses. Joe Conley appears as a newspaper publisher.
118	14	"Ed the Sentry"	Arthur Lubin	Lou Derman & Larry Rhine	March 3, 1965
Carol thinks she is developing an allergy to horses, making Ed think his days living with the Posts are numbered. To remedy the situation and to prove that horses are smart, Ed decides to become a volunteer for Air Force sentry duty. Peter Hobbs & Bill Idelson appear as Air Force psychologists who test Ed.
119	15	"Ed's Diction Teacher"	Arthur Lubin	Lou Derman & Larry Rhine	March 10, 1965
Wilbur accidentally ends up pulling the stuffing out of Winnie's toy horse. When Ed overhears Gordon talking about "Stuffing the horse", Ed goes into shock and loses his ability to speak coherently. George Ives appears as the diction teacher.
120	16	"Ed the Godfather"	Arthur Lubin	Lou Derman & Larry Rhine	March 17, 1965
Ed becomes a Godfather when an Italian mare named Gina has her foal when her owner is away. Gina wants her owners doctor to deliver her foal. She also has a craving for pizza. Frank Wilcox appears as Dr. Chadkin.
121	17	"Ed's Contact Lenses"	Arthur Lubin	Lou Derman & Larry Rhine	March 24, 1965
When a Park Attendant (Benny Rubin) laughs at Ed for wearing glasses, he demands to be taken to Dr. Fosdick, Sr. (Howard Wendell), the optometrist, so he can be examined for contact lenses. Roy Stuart appears as Dr. Fosdick, Jr.
122	18	"The Dragon Horse"	Ira Stewart	Lou Derman & Larry Rhine	March 31, 1965
Ed doesn't want to leave his stall as his horoscope predicts doom if he does. Wilbur takes Ed out anyway and soon bad things start to happen. Carol brings a collection of items that were gathered for an auction and stores them in Ed's barn. The collection of objects reveal a fierce looking dragon horse that Ed believes will hex him. Carol finds a buyer for the dragon horse, but Wilbur finds out that Ed dumped it in the lake. Note: Recycles footage from Season 3, Episode 15, "Ol' Rockin' Chair".
123	19	"Ed's Cold Tail"	Arthur Lubin	Lou Derman & Larry Rhine	April 7, 1965
Ed tries to trick Wilbur into installing a heating system in his stall, and Connie tries to trick Wilbur into buying a new refrigerator.
124	20	"The Bank Robbery"	Arthur Lubin	Lou Derman & Larry Rhine	April 14, 1965
Ed accidentally becomes the "drop" for stolen money when a bank robber (Marc Lawrence), stashes his stolen cash in Ed's saddle. When the robber comes to reclaim the money, Ed manages to capture him.
125	21	"My Horse, the Mailman"	Arthur Lubin	Lou Derman & Larry Rhine	April 28, 1965
When Wilbur designs a post office with a Pony Express statue, Ed becomes amazed at the thought that his ancestors used to deliver mail. Ed envisions himself as a member of The Pony Express so much that he steals a bag full of mail from the postman (Nick Stewart), and delivers all the mail in it. Ed keeps taking letters from Wilbur and mailing them. To teach Ed a lesson, Wilbur tells him one of the letters was an offer to sell Ed to a neighbor. Ed then goes and steals the mailbox. A policeman (Mickey Simpson) catches Wilbur trying to put the box back.
126	22	"Whiskers and Tails"	Arthur Lubin	Lou Derman & Larry Rhine	May 5, 1965
Ed is paranoid over a new neighbor (Sebastian Cabot) who happens to be an archeology professor and who has a mustache and a beard and is a horse-hater. Meanwhile, Winnie and Carol try to find a wife for Professor Thorndike. They set him up with Mrs. Weaver (Meg Wyllie) and Marge Connors (Hazel Shermet).
127	23	"Robin Hood Ed"	Arthur Lubin	Lou Derman & Larry Rhine	May 12, 1965
A movie producer is looking for a fresh face to play Robin Hood in his new film and Carol convinces Wilbur to try out. He rehearses with Ed, but he keeps flubbing his cues. Thinking Wilbur is becoming poor, Ed decides to rob from the Kirkwoods to help Wilbur.
128	24	"Ed the Artist"	Arthur Lubin	Lou Derman & Larry Rhine	May 19, 1965
Ed wants to leave his mark on the world. He takes up painting and comes up with an ugly abstract portrait of Carol, which gets Wilbur in trouble with her. Wilbur takes the painting to Professor Meyerhoff (John Banner) to see if it has any merit. Henry Corden appears as Schindler the artist.
129	25	"Jon Provost Meets Mister Ed"	Arthur Lubin	Lou Derman & Larry Rhine	June 9, 1965
Jon Provost stars as the pitcher for Wilbur's little league team. Johnny gets into trouble with Gordon after breaking one of his windows while delivering on his paper route. Gordon has Johnny work off the window by doing chores around his house even if it means missing the big game.
130	26	"My Horse, the Ranger"	Arthur Lubin	Lou Derman & Larry Rhine	June 16, 1965
Carol prepares a ranger outing for girls. Wilbur is asked to do the same type of things for the boys also. Ed is interested in participating. Note: Last episode to feature the Kirkwoods.

=== Season 6 (1965–66) ===
No. overall	No. in season	Title	Directed by	Written by	Original release date
131	1	"Ed the Counterspy"	Arthur Lubin	Lou Derman & Larry Rhine	September 12, 1965
Ed discovers that some spies are using the park to drop secret messages. When Wilbur finds some microfilm, he teams up with Ed to stop the spies. Meanwhile, Wilbur's father-in-law (Barry Kelley) visits again and tries to persuade Carol to leave Wilbur. Mike Mazurki, James Flavin and Jacqueline Beer appear as the spies.
132	2	"Ed à-Go-Go"	Arthur Lubin	Lou Derman & Larry Rhine	September 19, 1965
New neighbor Mr. Kerrigan's (Frank Wilcox) teenage son Jeff (Johnny Crawford) is playing loud rock 'n' roll records late at night, annoying Wilbur and Carol. Wilbur agrees to help the boy with school work hoping to get work with Mr. Kerrigan, who happens to be a builder. Ed comes up with an idea that go-go music might just help Wilbur get that job, because the boy might relate to him better.
133	3	"Coldfinger"	Arthur Lubin	Lou Derman & Larry Rhine	September 26, 1965
Having previously been successful in helping to apprehend Russian spies possessing stolen microfilm, the Chief of the Secret Intelligence Agency, J. G. Slattery (James Flavin), calls on Wilbur to find a tiny secret radio that has disappeared. Ed finds the clue in a Chinese restaurant which is the hideout to a foreign spy named Kosh (Oscar Beregi) and his assistant Derrick (Henry Brandon). Note: (Part 1 of 2)
134	4	"Spies Strike Back" "Ed Breaks the Hip Code"	Arthur Lubin	Lou Derman & Larry Rhine	October 3, 1965
The Secret Intelligence Agency want Ed and Wilbur to go undercover again to fight the spies Kosh and Derrick, who have stolen an unknown American secret formula. Ed and Wilbur have to figure out the "hip code" that Mai Ling (Nobu McCarthy) uses to transfer information in the Chinese restaurant. Note: (Part 2 of 2)
135	5	"Love and the Single Horse"	Arthur Lubin	Lou Derman & Larry Rhine	October 10, 1965
Mr. Ed writes a hot and spicy autobiography titled Love and the Single Horse. Wilbur takes it inside his house to read and Carol finds it. She thinks Wilbur wrote it and sells it to a publisher (Raymond Bailey). Ed is furious and runs off to a wax museum. Irene Ryan appears as a woman who sees Wilbur talking to Ed in the museum.
136	6	"Anybody Got a Zebra" "Monkey Involved in Spy Ring"	Arthur Lubin	Lou Derman & Larry Rhine	October 17, 1965
The SIA (Secret Intelligence Agency) once again enlists Wilbur to figure out how secret papers are being stolen out of filing cabinets, which are right under the agent's noses. In order to help solve the case, Mister Ed needs to speak to an Organ Grinder's (Vincent Beck) monkey. Unable to understand the monkey's accent, Ed needs a zebra as a translator. Percy Helton appears as the zoo keeper.
137	7	"TV or not TV"	Alan Young	Lou Derman & Larry Rhine	October 24, 1965
Ed answers a hard question regarding chess on a radio game show and ends up winning Wilbur a new color TV set. Ed demands that Wilbur put it in the barn. George N. Neise appears as Happy Hannegan, the radio game show host.
138	8	"The Horse and the Pussycat"	Ira Stewart & Alan Young	Lou Derman & Larry Rhine	October 31, 1965
Carol offers to look after her friend Selma Pritchard's (Hazel Shermet) cat while she is vacationing in Hawaii for an entire week. Wilbur ends up doing most of the work, making him busy. Ed then starts feeling neglected and plans ways to get rid of the cat. Henry Corden appears as Schultz the butcher.
139	9	"Don't Skin That Bear"	Alan Young	Lou Derman & Larry Rhine	November 7, 1965
Ed wants Wilbur to get rid of a bearskin rug that was given to Carol and him by her father. Wilbur refuses because he has always returned previous gifts, and doesn't want to do it this time. Ed puts an add in the paper for the rug, knowing Wilbur can't turn down a good swap.
140	10	"Ed the Bridegroom"	Alan Young	Lou Derman & Larry Rhine	December 26, 1965
Ed wants Wilbur to help him marry a filly named Rosita, and Carol's father thinks that Wilbur is in need of mental help. Wilbur speaks to a Justice of the Peace (John Qualen), who tells him he can't marry horses. Carol's father has Wilbur see Dr. Brink (Les Tremayne), a psychiatrist. Ed dreams he has a real legal marriage ceremony.
141	11	"Ed and the Motorcycle"	Arthur Lubin	Lou Derman & Larry Rhine	January 2, 1966
Ed refuses to continue to wear a saddle and he demands that Wilbur ride him bareback from now on, so Wilbur gets a motorcycle to retaliate. Ed must then figure out a way to win Wilbur back. Judson Pratt appears as a Park Policeman.
142	12	"Cherokee Ed"	Arthur Lubin	Lou Derman & Larry Rhine	January 9, 1966
Ed discovers that he is of Cherokee descent from his mother. Ed then refuses to participate in the Pioneer Parade because Wilbur wants him to have a parrot descended from General Custer's parrot ride on his back. Unfortunately for Wilbur, he has already promised Carol's Dad that Ed would do it as a favor for him. Wilbur has Ed make him an honorary Indian and he then threatens to scalp the parrot. Ed has a change of heart and says forgive and forget.
143	13	"Ed Goes to College"	Arthur Lubin	Lou Derman & Larry Rhine	February 6, 1966
Mr. Ed wants to go to college so he can become a veterinarian. Wilbur pleads with Ed to stick to being a horse and to promise not to sneak off to the school, but Ed does it anyway. Ed then proceeds to open an Animal Clinic in the barn.
