= Al Simon =

American producer (1911–2000)

- Born: November 11, 1911; New York, U.S.
- Died: May 18, 2000 (aged 88); Beverly Hills, California, U.S.
- Education: Columbia University; New York University
- Occupations: Producer, production manager
- Spouse: Caro Jones
- Children: 1

Al Simon (November 11, 1911 – May 18, 2000) was an American producer and production manager.

== Early life ==
Al Simon earned a degree in English literature at Columbia University in 1932, then earned a law degree from New York University. He wrote articles for Collier's and Cosmopolitan. He was publicity director of WHN radio in New York City, then served in the US Army in World War II.

== Career ==
Simon entered television in 1946, working on the This is Your Life television series and The George Burns and Gracie Allen Show.

He served as an executive producer in Mister Ed and also producing television programs such as The Jack Benny Program, I Love Lucy, The Bob Cummings Show, I Married Joan, and My Sister Eileen.

In 1960 Simon became president of Filmways, a production company that made such shows as The Beverly Hillbillies, Petticoat Junction and Green Acres.

Simon died in May 2000 of Alzheimer's disease at the Cedars-Sinai Medical Center in Beverly Hills, California, at the age of 88.
