= Mister Ed =

American sitcom (1961–1966)

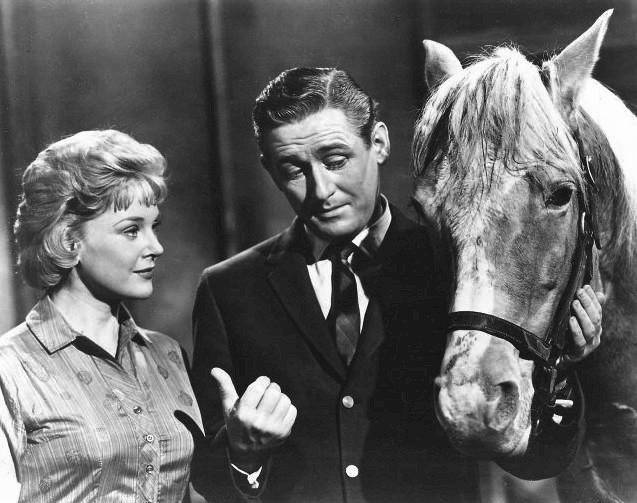
- Main cast
- Genre: Sitcom
- Based on: "The Talking Horse" by Walter R. Brooks
- Developed by: Sonia Chernus
- Starring: Alan Young; Connie Hines; Bamboo Harvester; Larry Keating; Edna Skinner; Leon Ames
- Voices of: Allan "Rocky" Lane
- Theme music composer: Ray Evans; Jay Livingston
- Opening theme: "Mister Ed", sung by Jay Livingston
- Composers: Raoul Krushaar; Jack Cookerly; Marlin Skiles; Dave Kahn
- Country of origin: United States
- Original language: English
- No. of seasons: 6
- No. of episodes: 143 (list of episodes)

Production
- Executive producer: Al Simon
- Producer: Arthur Lubin
- Cinematography: Archie R. Dalzell; Maury Gertsman
- Running time: 28 minutes
- Production companies: The Mister Ed Company; Filmways

Original release
- Network: Syndication
- Release: January 5 – July 2, 1961
- Network: CBS
- Release: October 1, 1961 – February 6, 1966

Related
- Mister Ed (2004 pilot)

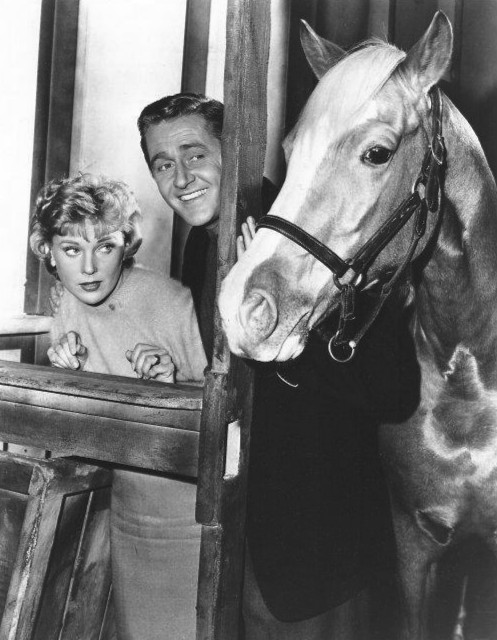
Connie Hines and Alan Young in TV's Mister Ed

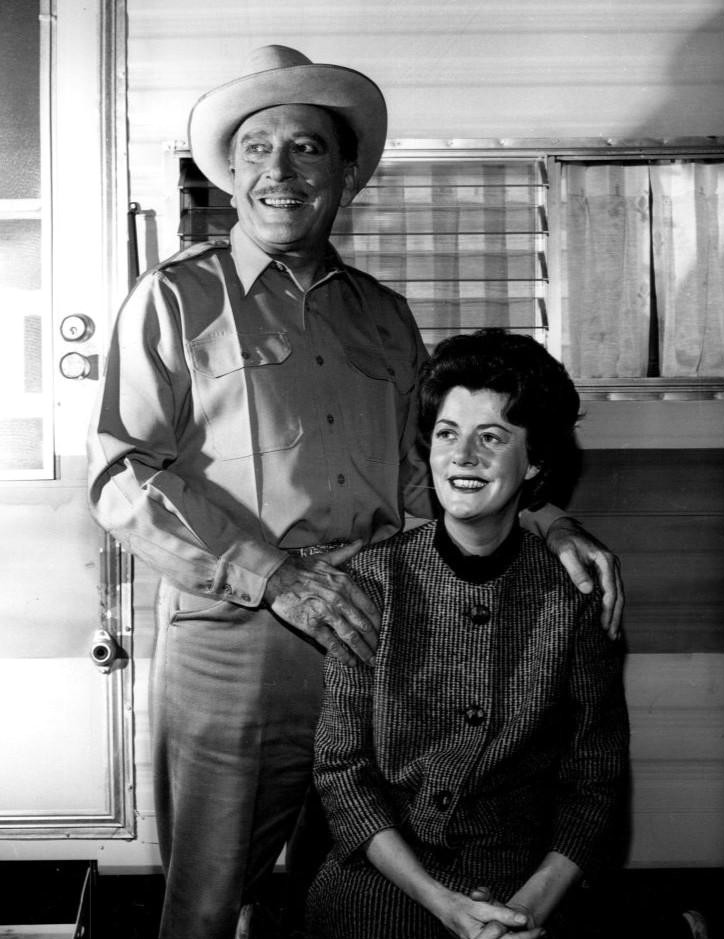
Leon Ames and Florence MacMichael

Mister Ed is an American television sitcom produced by Filmways that aired in syndication from January 5 to July 2, 1961, and then on CBS from October 1, 1961, to February 6, 1966. The show's title character is a talking horse which originally appeared in short stories by Walter R. Brooks. Alan Young starred as Wilbur Post, an architect who is the only person Ed will talk to; Ed was played by the gelding Bamboo Harvester and voiced by Allan Lane.

Arthur Lubin, who had directed the Francis the Talking Mule films, developed the series after failing to get the rights to Francis for television. George Burns financed the pilot. No network would buy the show, so Lubin sold it into first-run syndication, and CBS picked it up after its first 26 episodes. All 143 episodes were filmed in black and white. The theme song, written by Jay Livingston and Ray Evans, was sung by Livingston. Bamboo Harvester won four PATSY Awards, and reruns on Nick at Nite in the 1980s brought the show a new audience. Later attempts to revive the property include an unmade Disney film in the 1990s and a 2004 Fox pilot.

== Beginnings ==
The Mister Ed show concept was derived from a series of short stories by author Walter R. Brooks which began with "The Talking Horse" in the September 18, 1937, issue of Liberty magazine. Brooks is best known for the Freddy the Pig series of children's novels which feature talking animals that interact with humans. In the stories the couple were Wilbur and Carlotta Pope; for television they became Wilbur and Carol Post, because, Alan Young later wrote, "Carlotta was too operatic, and Pope a little religious". The series credits read "Format developed by Sonia Chernus from characters created by Walter Brooks". Chernus, Lubin's secretary, is said to have introduced him to the stories.

The show's concept resembles that of the Francis movies, in which an equine character talks to only one person, leading to a variety of opportunities and frustrations. The first six Francis films (1950–55) were directed by Lubin. He wanted to make a Francis television series, but had been unable to secure the rights, so he optioned the Brooks stories for television. Comedian George Burns financed the pilot for Mister Ed, which was shot at his McCadden Studio in Hollywood at a cost of $70,000. Jack Benny was also involved behind the scenes.

None of the three networks bought the pilot. Producer Al Simon joined the project and had the pilot cut into a 15-minute presentation, which the advertising agency D'Arcy brought to Studebaker. Under the arrangement, each Studebaker dealer contributed $25 for every car sold, matched by the company, and the dealers bought time for the show on their local stations. It had single-sponsor identification on over 100 stations. The show was recast with Alan Young as the lead. According to Young, it was George Burns who suggested him, saying "He looks like the kind of a guy a horse would talk to." Lou Derman was hired as head writer. Production began in November 1960, although Lubin did not direct early episodes as he was working in Europe on a film. The first 26 episodes were received well enough for the show to be picked up by CBS. Young recalled that CBS programming head James T. Aubrey gave it the Sunday 7 p.m. slot, ahead of Lassie and The Ed Sullivan Show.

Burns oversaw the staging of the first 13 episodes. The audience's response to his warm-up at the first studio preview was recorded and used as the show's laugh track.

== Synopsis ==
The show in effect had two leads operating as a comedy team. The title role of Mister Ed, a talking palomino, was played by the gelding Bamboo Harvester and voiced by former Western film actor Allan Lane. The role of Ed's owner, a genial but somewhat klutzy architect named Wilbur Post, was played by Alan Young. The Posts lived at 17230 Valley Spring Road in the San Fernando Valley of Los Angeles. Many of the program's gags follow from Ed's tendency to talk only to Wilbur, his mysteriously well-cultured manner, his mischief, and behavior far more intelligent than anyone around Wilbur expects of a horse. A running gag is other characters hearing Wilbur talking to Ed and asking to whom he is talking. Another centers on Wilbur being accident-prone and inadvertently causing harm to himself and others.

The other main character throughout the series is Wilbur's generally tolerant young wife, Carol (Connie Hines). The Posts also have two sets of neighbors, to whom Ed delights in making Wilbur appear as eccentric as possible. They included the Addisons, Roger (Larry Keating) and his wife Kay (Edna Skinner), who both appeared from the pilot episode until Keating's death in 1963; thereafter, Skinner continued appearing as Kay, without mention of Roger's absence, until the neighbors were recast. During this period, Kay's brother Paul Fenton (Jack Albertson), who had made occasional appearances before, appears. Following the Addisons, the Posts' new neighbors were Col. Gordon Kirkwood, USAF (Ret.), Wilbur's former commanding officer (Leon Ames), and his wife Winnie (Florence MacMichael). They appeared on the series from 1963 to 1965. In the final season the Kirkwoods were phased out, and Carol's father, Mr. Higgins (Barry Kelley), who had appeared occasionally throughout the series, moved in with Wilbur and Carol. Higgins dislikes Wilbur, calls him a "kook", and keeps urging Carol to divorce him.

Ed's ability to talk was never explained and rarely contemplated on the show. In the first episode, when Wilbur says he cannot understand the situation, Ed offers the show's only remark on the subject: "Don't try. It's bigger than both of us!"

== Cast ==
=== Main ===
- Alan Young as Wilbur Post
- Connie Hines as Carol Post
- Bamboo Harvester as Mister Ed (credited as "Himself")
- Allan Lane as the voice of Mister Ed (uncredited)
- Larry Keating as Roger Addison (seasons 1–4)
- Edna Skinner as Camille "Kay" Addison (seasons 1–4)
- Leon Ames as Col. Gordon Kirkwood (seasons 4–5)
- Florence MacMichael as Winnie Kirkwood (seasons 4–5)

=== Recurring ===
- Jack Albertson as Paul Fenton (seasons 1–3)
- Barry Kelley as Mr. Higgins, Carol's father (guest 1962–1964, recurring 1965–1966)

=== Guest stars ===
Celebrities who appeared as themselves include Mae West, Clint Eastwood, George Burns, Zsa Zsa Gabor, Leo Durocher, Jon Provost, Johnny Crawford and Sebastian Cabot; Jack LaLanne is seen on Ed's television in "Psychoanalyst Show". Actors in character roles included Donna Douglas, who appeared in three episodes, Irene Ryan, Raymond Bailey, Alan Hale Jr., Neil Hamilton, Hayden Rorke, William Bendix and Sharon Tate.

== Production ==
The original, unaired pilot was titled "Wilbur Pope and Mister Ed". It was directed by Lubin, produced by Lubin and William Burns, and starred Scott McKay as Wilbur Pope and Sandra White as his wife; its credits run over footage of Studebaker cars. It survived in a Studebaker sales presentation film that followed it with a pitch to dealers by George Burns and an introduction to Young and Hines. The pilot used an unrelated instrumental big-band theme and a script nearly identical to the series premiere.

The horse in the unaired pilot was a chestnut gelding. Al Simon considered it "a pathetic-looking nag" and wanted a better-looking horse. Trainer Les Hilton bought Bamboo Harvester for $1,500 from the president of the California Palomino Society; the horse was gelded after the purchase. Bamboo Harvester (1949–1970) was a crossbred palomino of American Saddlebred, Arabian and grade ancestry. A second pilot was filmed, and Bamboo Harvester stayed with the series until its cancellation.

=== Making Ed "talk" ===
Mister Ed's producers left the performers of the title role uncredited, the show's credits listing Mister Ed as being played only by "Himself."

Ed's spoken lines were provided by Allan "Rocky" Lane, a former B-movie cowboy star. Lane was staying with Hilton when Simon and Lubin heard his voice during a publicity shoot at Hilton's ranch. He agreed to take the part only if his name was kept off the credits. During filming, he read Ed's lines into a microphone at the edge of the set. After the show became a hit, Lane asked for screen credit; Simon argued that the "played by himself" credit had convinced younger viewers that Ed really talked, and gave Lane a raise instead. After the third season, the producers auditioned for replacements for Lane, but no one else fit the role.

Sheldon Allman provided Ed's singing voice. The solo line "I am Mister Ed" at the close of the theme song was sung by its composer, Jay Livingston.

Another palomino, Pumpkin, reportedly served as Bamboo Harvester's body double.

Hilton had trained the mule for Lubin's Francis films. Alan Young recalled: "It was initially done by putting a piece of nylon thread in his mouth. But Ed actually learned to move his lips on cue when the trainer touched his hoof. In fact, he soon learned to do it when I stopped talking during a scene! Ed was very smart."

Reports circulated during and after the show's run that the talking effect was achieved by applying peanut butter to the horse's gums. In his 1994 memoir Young declined to describe the method, saying only that it was Hilton's invention, was painless, and was "a little like having peanut butter stuck under your top lip". He later said he had invented the peanut butter story: "Al Simon and Arthur Lubin, the producers, suggested we keep the method a secret because they thought kids would be disappointed if they found out the technical details of how it was done, so I made up the peanut butter story, and everyone bought it."

Hilton told Young that he was Ed's "father image", who had to scold him, while Young's job was to have "motherly appeal". When Hilton cracked his whip (only as a sound; Young wrote that Ed was never struck), the horse would put his chin on Young's shoulder for comfort.

=== Theme song ===
The theme song, "Mister Ed", was written by Jay Livingston and Ray Evans and sung by Livingston. The first seven episodes used only instrumental music to open the show; thereafter the version with lyrics was used. Livingston agreed to sing the song until a professional singer could be found, but the producers liked his vocals and kept them.

The theme song received renewed publicity twenty years after the show went off the air when Jim Brown, an evangelist from South Point, Ohio, claimed in May 1986 that it contained "satanic messages" if played in reverse. Brown and his colleague Greg Hudson claimed that the phrases "Someone sung this song for Satan" and "the source is Satan" would be audible. After one of their seminars, teenagers burned more than 300 albums. The teens did not burn a copy of Television's Greatest Hits, which includes the song, and Brown said that "Satan can be an influence whether they [the songwriters] know it or not. We don't think they did it on purpose and we're not getting down on Mister Ed."

=== Sponsorship ===
The series was sponsored from 1961 to 1963 by Studebaker-Packard Corporation, renamed Studebaker Corporation in 1962. At first, sponsorship came from Studebaker's dealers, with corporate sponsorship coming from South Bend once the series had been picked up by CBS. Studebakers were featured prominently in the show during this period. The Posts are shown owning a 1962 Lark convertible, the company used publicity shots of the Posts and Ed with its cars, and cast members appeared in "integrated commercials" for the Lark at the end of the program. When a Lark convertible served as the pace car at the 1962 Indianapolis 500, Connie Hines attended the race as part of the promotion.

Studebaker ended U.S. vehicle production in December 1963. The sponsorship ended, and Ford supplied the vehicles seen on camera from the beginning of 1965. Post Cereals became the show's new sponsor.

=== Cancellation ===
CBS cancelled the series in 1966. Young wrote that the announcement came without warning at a script read-through, while the show still drew around 47 percent of the audience in its time slot. He attributed the decision to a new CBS program director who wanted to move away from the "countrified" image of Filmways' rural comedies. Lubin and Simon paid Hilton a stipend from the show's profits to look after Bamboo Harvester, who lived out his retirement at Hilton's home in Burbank.

== Home media ==
MGM Home Entertainment released two Best-of collections of Mister Ed on DVD in Region 1. Volume 1 (released January 13, 2004) contains 21 episodes and Volume 2 (released March 8, 2005) contains 20 episodes. MGM also released a single disc, Mister Ed's Barnyard Favorites, on July 26, 2005, which contains the first eight episodes from Volume 1. The collections sold poorly, and no further volumes were released; in 2008 Brooks's widow sued MGM over DVD royalties.

Shout! Factory announced in June 2009 that it had acquired the rights and released the first five seasons between 2009 and 2011. The fourth and fifth seasons were sold only through Shout!'s online store. The Season One set uses syndicated edits of eight episodes; the other season sets contain full-length versions. The 22-disc Mister Ed: The Complete Series followed on December 9, 2014, and it includes all 143 episodes, with the eight first-season episodes uncut. The sixth and final season was released on its own on May 12, 2015.

DVD name	Ep #	Release date
Season One/The Complete First Season	26	October 6, 2009
The Complete Second Season	26	February 2, 2010
The Complete Third Season	26	June 1, 2010
The Complete Fourth Season (Note: Shout! Factory exclusive, sold only through Shout!'s online store.)	26	November 16, 2010
The Complete Fifth Season	26	June 21, 2011
The Complete Series	143	December 9, 2014
The Final Season/The Complete Sixth Season	13	May 12, 2015

The second-season episode "Ed the Beneficiary" is in the public domain. It was a 19-minute film made for the United States Department of the Treasury in the style of an episode, with the full cast but no laugh track, promoting Savings Bonds, and the original unaired pilot, which was published without a copyright notice.

== Remakes ==
In March 1995, it was reported Walt Disney Pictures had approached Kelsey Grammer about playing Wilbur Post in a feature film adaptation of Mister Ed, but Grammer did not want his first major film role to be playing a television character. The film would have featured a plot inspired by Cyrano de Bergerac where Wilbur would win the affections of Carol by Ed feeding him the right things to say.

In 2004, Fox made a pilot for an updated version, starring Sherman Hemsley as the voice of Mister Ed, David Alan Basche as Wilbur and Sherilyn Fenn as Carol. It was directed by Michael Spiller and written by Drake Sather, and was not picked up as a series.

In 2012, Waterman Entertainment announced it was developing a feature film based on Mister Ed.

== Legacy ==
Bamboo Harvester won four PATSY Awards for animal performers. He died while Hilton was away visiting relatives in Oklahoma, after the man looking after him gave him a tranquilizer; he was cremated in Los Angeles and his ashes were scattered.

Reruns on Nick at Nite in the 1980s brought the series a new audience.

A racehorse named after the character ran in the 1994 Grand National steeplechase at Aintree, England, but did not complete the course.

A horse that died in Oklahoma was widely reported to be Mister Ed. Young wrote that it was a palomino rented by Filmways for publicity stills in 1960, whose owner later toured it as the original. The horse buried at Tahlequah is reportedly Pumpkin, who died in 1979. In 2007, a housing developer planned a community near Tahlequah, Oklahoma, themed on the show and its period and built around that grave.

== See also ==
- List of fictional horses
- Clever Hans
