= List of Dennis the Menace (1959 TV series) episodes =

Episodes of the American sitcom

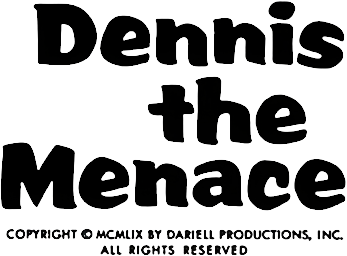
Dennis the Menace 1959 title screen, used up until 1962.

This is a list of episodes from the 1959–1963 United States television series Dennis the Menace. The series is based on the Hank Ketcham comic strip of the same name.

The series ran for four seasons for a total of 146 episodes from October 4, 1959 to July 7, 1963.

All of the episodes in this show are black-and-white.

== Series overview ==
Season	Episodes	Originally released	
Season	Episodes	First released	Last released
1	32	October 4, 1959	June 6, 1960
2	38	October 2, 1960	June 25, 1961
3	38	October 1, 1961	July 1, 1962
4	38	September 30, 1962	July 7, 1963

== Episodes ==
=== Season 1 (1959–60) ===
No. overall	No. in season	Title	Directed by	Written by	Original release date
1	1	"Dennis Goes to the Movies"	William D. Russell	William Cowley & Peggy Chantler	October 4, 1959
Dennis and his friend Joey McDonald try to fix the leg on the kitchen table and make a big mess. The boys then try and help Mr. Wilson paint his house, but that does not go well. George tells Alice and Henry what Dennis did. Alice and Henry want to go to a cowboy movie and luckily find a new sitter for Dennis. Dennis really wants to see the film as well. Dennis sneaks Joey into the house. Mrs. Porter (Madge Blake), the babysitter, arrives. Joey agrees to pretend to be Dennis and Dennis sneaks out of the house. Dennis finds a way to get into the theater to see the cowboy film. Dennis winds up disturbing many of the movie patrons. Getting a little suspicious, Alice decides to call home. Mrs. Porter tells Alice what a little angel "Dennis" is. After the movie, Dennis uses George's ladder and makes a lot of noise getting back into the house. Alice and Henry come home and Mrs. Porter says that besides a possible prowler in the neighborhood, everything was fine. Henry gets a call from George, who was arrested as the prowler when he tried to get his ladder back. Note: This pilot was made late in 1958. Mrs. Wilson does not appear. Also, due to editing issues, the final two-minute scene was shot in August 1959, when Dennis obviously had a different hairstyle and sounded more polished than during the rest of the episode.
2	2	"Dennis and the Signpost"	William D. Russell	William Cowley & Peggy Chantler	October 11, 1959
Henry is cleaning out the attic and finds a large fire cracker. Mr. Wilson stakes out an area of his backyard that he will have reseeded. After an altercation with Mrs. Elkins, George feels that no one in the neighborhood likes him. The next day, Dennis and Tommy fix a fallen street signpost but fail to notice they have put it up with the street names facing in the wrong direction. George and Martha go for a drive in the country. Because of the mix up with the street sign, some men that were to put in a pool on the other street, start digging in George's yard. Dennis tells people around the neighborhood about George's pool. Later that day, George and Martha come home but do not look in the backyard. Several people are unusually friendly towards George. The next morning, Tommy finds the large firecracker and Dennis puts it in the trash. Henry unknowingly dumps it in the incinerator, causing a big bang. George hears the explosion, looks in the backyard and sees the giant hole. Thinking they are being bombed, George runs around outside yelling "air raid". George speaks to Mr. Banner (Robert Bice), from the pool company, about them filling the hole and reseeding it. Mr. Banner tells his Cement Worker (James Anderson) that he fixed the street sign himself so there won't be a problem. Not knowing this, Dennis and Tommy decide to fix the signpost. Eve McVeagh as Mrs. Purcell. Hal Baylor as Driver. Larry J. Blake as Operator. Helen Kleeb as Mrs. Holland. Note: This is the first appearance of Martha Wilson, Tommy Anderson (Billy Booth), Margaret Wade and Lucy Elkins as well as the first of six appearances in the first season by Ron Howard as Dennis' friend Stewart. Mrs. Wilson, played by Sylvia Field, appeared in several episodes that were made before but aired after this one. While this was the eighth episode made in the summer of 1959, it was the second episode to air.
3	3	"The Fishing Trip"	William D. Russell	William Cowley & Peggy Chantler	October 18, 1959
Dennis and Stewart are bothering Mr. Wilson and he mentions how he cannot wait until the next morning. Apparently, Henry and George have a fishing trip planned and are trying to keep Dennis from finding out. Alice tells Henry that if Dennis does find out, they have to take him with. Dennis is making chocolate soup for Stewart and Joey when a man delivers a package to the house. It has fishing stuff in it and Alice puts it on the closet shelf and tells Dennis to stay away from it. Alice catches Dennis trying to look at the package and puts it in the attic. It turns out to be a long night for Dennis as he will not rest until he finds out what is in the package. During the night, Henry keeps trying to get the package out of the attic. Dennis wakes up and finds the attic door open. Thinking there might be burglars, he locks the door not knowing Henry and Alice are in there. Dennis then screams out the window about the burglars hoping to wake George up. Henry gets Dennis to unlock the door. George comes over with a shot gun and the police arrive. The next morning, Henry finds a jar of worms that Dennis left him. Knowing that Dennis figured out about the trip, Henry and George take him along. Note: This was the second episode made but held back in order to air a more recent episode where the cast is more established.
4	4	"Grandpa and Miss Cathcart"	William D. Russell	William Cowley & Peggy Chantler	October 25, 1959
Alice's father, Charlie Perkins (James Bell), calls and says he is coming for a visit. Charlie tells Alice that he does not want any of her "matchmaking" as she did during his last visit. He spent a miserable time with Mrs. Lucy Elkins (Irene Tedrow). Meanwhile, Mr. Dorfman the Mailman (Robert B. Williams) is trying to avoid Miss Esther Cathcart. She drags him into her house for some tea. The next day, Grandpa Perkins arrives. Dennis tells Miss Cathcart about Grandpa and she would like to meet him. Charlie meets young Margaret and Dennis says he has another friend he would like him to meet. Dennis takes Grandpa to Miss Cathcart's house and Grandpa thinks he is going to meet another young friend. Charlie gets stuck listening to Esther sing for two hours. Dennis tells Mrs. Elkins that Grandpa is visiting and she calls him up. To put Lucy off, Charlie says that he met a very nice woman earlier that day. Dennis overhears and goes to tell Miss Cathcart, who comes over to the house. Dennis goes into the closet to hide from Margaret and finds Grandpa in there hiding as well. Note: Mr. and Mrs. Wilson do not appear in this episode. This is the first appearance for Esther Cathcart, played by Mary Wickes.
5	5	"Innocents in Space"	William D. Russell	George Tibbles	November 1, 1959
Dennis and Tommy are watching a children's TV show about a space traveler named Captain Blast (Parley Baer). The Captain has a monkey sidekick named Lieutenant Peep. George tells Martha that he thinks Captain Blast is giving children incorrect information about space. Martha tells George that Mr. Sandy Loomis is bringing over George's new telescope. Captain Blast wants all his viewers to shoot their tracer gun into the air at 7:30 in the evening so the Martians can see it. Mr. Loomis sets up George's telescope and says that George might even be able to see the missing satellite that was sent up. That night, George believes he has spotted the satellite. What he actually saw was a ping-pong ball that glows in the dark from Dennis' tracer gun. George calls the newspapers with his story. The next morning, George shows Henry his story in the paper. He mentions that reporters will come to his house that evening hoping to see the satellite again. That night the two reporters and Henry are in George's yard. They learn that it is Dennis shooting his ping-pong balls. The next morning Alice finds out that Dennis won Captain Blast's contest and he will visit Dennis later that day. Captain Blast arrives and George wants to expose him as a fraud. Captain Blast is telling the children stories and George keeps correcting the science. Sensing that Captain Blast is a hero to the children, George has a change of heart and goes along with the Captain's stories.
6	6	"Dennis' Garden"	William D. Russell	Hannibal Coons & Milton Pascal & George Tibbles	November 8, 1959
Dennis and Tommy are bothering Mr. Wilson while he is working in his garden. George tells Henry and Alice that he is entering the Garden Club contest and he bought some very expensive Dahlia bulbs. Henry and George decide to plant Dennis a flower garden of his own hoping to keep Dennis out of George's flower garden. Henry and Dennis go to Mr. Merrivale's (Will Wright) garden shop. Dennis repeats a few things that George said about Merrivale that he should not have. Later, Dennis thinks the Dahlia bulbs that George planted in his garden were scraggly sweet potatoes. Wanting to help George, Dennis digs them out and puts in fresh real sweet potatoes. Dennis tells Alice what he did. During the night, Henry goes to replace them, but Dennis already has, so the mix up still exists. Mr. Wilson unknowingly plants his Dahlia bulbs in Dennis' garden. Time passes, the plants grow and George cannot understand why his looks the way they do. Thanks to Mr. Merrivale, George discovers that his plants are sweet potatoes. After Dennis tells Henry what he did, Henry explains the mix-up to George. Dennis and George both win blue ribbons for their gardens.
7	7	"The New Neighbors"	William D. Russell	William Cowley & Peggy Chantler	November 15, 1959
Mr. Burnley (Ralph Dumke), Mr. Wilson's neighbor, is trying to sell his house. He tells George that if he can find someone to buy the house he will give George a commission. Misunderstanding something George said, Dennis takes some flowers from George's garden to give to his mother. Dennis walks back and forth in front of Mr. Burnley's house banging a drum and announcing it is for sale. George hopes to talk Andrew (Lewis Martin) and Helen Scott (Louise Lorimer) into buying the house. They are a retired couple with no children. Mr. Ferris (Norman Leavitt), the window repairman, comes to the Wilson house to fix a window George broke. Andrew and Helen arrive and George tells them about the house and the quiet neighborhood. Mr. Ferris overhears this. They are very interested in the house until Dennis and his friends come bursting into George's house and the couple see how loud things will be. Dennis tells George that Mr. Ferris is going to buy the house. He has 3 kids and twins on the way, which is not what George wanted at all. Note: This was the first of only two appearances in the series for Tommy's often-mentioned mother, Mrs. Anderson, played by character actress Jean Howell. The other was in the second season episode "Dennis and the Saxophone."
8	8	"Tenting Tonight"	William D. Russell	William Cowley & Peggy Chantler	November 22, 1959
Dennis and Tommy find a large stuffed moose head in the trash and they bring it to Dennis' house. The Wilsons return from a camping trip. Dennis confesses that he hit a baseball through George's kitchen window. It turned on the faucet and flooded the sink. Henry says that he cleaned everything up, but then Dennis hit a ball through that window again. George lends his equipment to Dennis so he and Tommy can camp in the backyard. Ted Melton (Dave Willock) calls and invites Henry and Alice over to listen to a sound-effects record. That night, Dennis and Tommy are in their tent outside and Henry and Alice are next door at the Melton's. Ted plays a train wreck record and it wakes up George and Martha. Ted then plays a wild animal record and George thinks a circus train crashed and the animals escaped. George thinks the boys are in danger and runs outside with his sword. Because he forgot his glasses, George thinks the moose head is real and starts hitting it with his sword. Dennis explains to George about Mr. Melton's sound-effects records. Martha gives George his glasses and he sees the moose is not real. Things get embarrassing for George when the police show up. Jenna McMahon as Mrs. Melton. Note: The soundtrack for this episode was released on side one of the 1960 album, "The Misadventures of Dennis the Menace" on Colpix Records.
9	9	"Dennis Sells Bottles"	William D. Russell	William Cowley & Peggy Chantler & Clifford Goldsmith	November 29, 1959
Henry is complaining about all the bills and Alice tells him she lost her engagement ring. Dennis starts to believe that his father is broke. Dennis decides to sell bottles in an attempt to make some extra money. He will also sell the Root Beer that is in the bottles. Henry brings his car in for service, but the Mechanic (Ollie O'Toole) cannot get to it until later in the day. Henry and Alice have errands to run, so the Mechanic lends his son's old jalopy to them. Dennis starts to spread around town that Henry could lose the TV, his car and house. While trying to get the money for his bottles, Dennis and Tommy make a mess in Quigley's market and drive Mr. Quigley crazy. Mrs. Elkins sees the Mitchells driving in the old car. Mrs. Holland sees the repairman taking away the Mitchell's TV. Mrs. Holland asks Henry and Alice if a couple who were in dire straits should accept charity. Henry and Alice think she is talking about Tommy's family and says yes. It is not long before the Mitchell house is full of donations. Another misunderstanding leads to Henry getting a black eye because he was playing golf at the club. Dennis finally tells his parents that he was the one telling everyone they were needy. Ray Walker as Man. Hope Summers as Mrs. Burns. Note: Mr. and Mrs. Wilson do not appear in this episode. This is the first appearance for grocer Otis Quigley, played by Willard Waterman. The soundtrack to this episode was released on side two of the 1960 album, "The Misadventures of Dennis the Menace" on Colpix Records.
10	10	"Mr. Wilson's Award"	Don Taylor	William Cowley & Peggy Chantler	December 6, 1959
Dr. Sinclair (Arthur Space) comes to the Mitchell house with a surprise plaque for Mr. Wilson. George is being honored for his service as chairman of the Community Chest Drive. Henry is to present it to George at a luncheon the next day. George tells Dennis and Tommy that he and Martha are going on a weeks vacation starting the next day. Dennis tells Dr. Sinclair about George's vacation. The Mitchells start a rumor that they are moving to New York in order to keep Mr. Wilson in town to receive the plaque. George agrees to say a few farewell words for the Mitchells at the luncheon. Things start getting out of hand once Dennis learns of the move and soon the whole neighborhood knows. George brings Robert Doubleday (Robert Foulk) to the Mitchell house because Robert is interested in buying their home. It gets more complicated when people ask about Henry's job, others bring goodbye presents and relatives start calling. Henry finally has to explain things to everyone.
11	11	"The Christmas Story" "Dennis & Christmas"	Don Taylor	William Cowley & Peggy Chantler	December 20, 1959
It is Christmas time and Dennis is going around the house looking for his presents. Henry tells Alice that the package from Grandpa with Dennis' sled arrived. Henry is going to hide some more presents in the trunk in the attic. When he gets there, he finds Dennis and Tommy trying to unlock the trunk. Henry asks Mr. Wilson if he could hide the presents in one of his closets. Dennis keeps trying to find where the presents are hidden. Dennis got Henry an alarm clock as a present. He sets it for later in the day. He hopes his mother will put it with the other presents and when it goes off, Dennis will know where they are hidden. It is four o'clock and Dennis does not hear the alarm. The clock alarm goes off in George's closet and he thinks it is the doorbell. George and Martha come over to the Mitchell house to help them decorate their tree. Everyone sings Silent Night and Dennis finishes the song himself. Dennis figures it out where the gifts are when he goes over to the Wilson's house and opens the closet door.
12	12	"Dennis and the Cowboy"	William D. Russell	William Cowley & Peggy Chantler	December 27, 1959
Mrs. Webster (Isabel Randolph) calls Alice and would like to speak to Dennis about being in the community pageant. Dennis is not interested until he learns that his cowboy idol, Whip Crawford, will also be in the show. Mrs. Webster comes by and Dennis causes a few awkward moments. Mrs. Webster says that it is between Dennis and Johnny Brady as to who will be in the pageant. Johnny accepts a turtle from Dennis to not compete with him. Whip tells his manager, Art Barnes, he does not want to be in the play because his feet hurt. Mrs. Webster assumes that Whip is just running late and starts rehearsals without him. She finally calls Art and learns that Whip is not coming. In his hotel room, Whip is talking to a couple of reporters. Dennis finds a way to sneak into his room and keeps stepping on Whip's feet. Dennis brings up the pageant. Only because the reporters are there, Whip agrees to go to the rehearsal. Olan Soule as Reporter #2. Note: The role of Crawford is played by Brad Johnson (1924–1981), who had been the deputy Lofty Craig on the syndicated western series Annie Oakley. This was the third episode made, and had been held to show more recently made episodes. It also is the first episode to include Dennis' rival Johnny Brady, played by Gregory Irvin. (Mr. and Mrs. Wilson do not appear in this episode.)
13	13	"Dennis Haunts a House"	Charles Barton	George Tibbles	January 3, 1960
Dennis, Tommy, and Stewart are having a club meeting under Dennis' kitchen table. Henry tells the boys they have to find somewhere else to have their meetings. Alice and Martha come back from tea and tell Henry and George about fortune-teller Madame Tina (Maudie Prickett). Meanwhile, the boys find an entrance to a crawl space under George's house and decide to make it their clubhouse. Martha tells George that Madame Tina said he will hear from Daniel Wilson, a late relative from 1859. George is skeptical as Martha says she mentioned Daniel's name to Tina first. Madame Tina comes by the Wilson house and continues to say George will hear from Daniel. When George taps on the table, everyone hears tapping back. They do not know it is the boys in the basement. The next day, the boys are in the crawl space again and George starts to hear strange noises. The boys play a Daniel Boone record and George hears the name Daniel being said. He tells Henry about it and they both conclude he must have been dreaming. That night, Tommy is spending the night at Dennis' house. The boys sneak out of the house to go to the clubhouse to retrieve Henry's briefcase. George hears more noises. It is finally learned that the boys were in the basement and George is glad to know that it was not Daniel.
14	14	"Dennis' Tree House"	Charles Barton	William Cowley & Peggy Chantler & Hannibal Coons	January 10, 1960
Dennis and Henry finish building Dennis' tree house. Part of it hangs over Mr. Wilson's back yard. George is not thrilled about it because he thinks that Dennis up in the tree house will scare all the birds away. George is using his bird caller. He thinks he is getting a response from another bird, but it is Dennis in the tree house using his own bird caller. Alice suggests to George that if he taught Dennis about bird watching, maybe he would learn to not make so much noise. George shows Dennis and Tommy his binoculars. Dennis and Tommy see a bird and Tommy says it is just like a stuffed one he has at home. Mr. Anderson tries to tell the boys that the bird they think they saw was a Canadian Crested Warbler and could not be around this area. The next day, George sees the bird as well and calls Frederick Timberlake, the head of the Bird Watchers Club. Frederick confirms it is the rare bird and wants to call Mr. Pomeroy (Maurice Manson), of the State Society. Dennis and Tommy put the bird in a box as it looks sick. They then see the bird's nest with babies in it. The boys put Tommy's stuffed bird by the nest to keep the babies company. Mr. Pomeroy arrives, sees the stuffed bird and thinks George was trying to trick him. Dennis and Tommy explain to the men about the sick bird. Mr. Pomeroy now wants to add George's, Dennis' and Tommy's names to an honor scroll. Note: This is the first of only two appearances in the series of Tommy's father, Mr. Anderson, although he is mentioned in many episodes spanning the show's entire run. Mr. Anderson, who is played by Lee Millar, also appeared in the third-season episode, "Dennis and the Pee Wee League." While Byron Foulger plays Mr. Timberlake in this episode as well as "Dennis and the Dog" later in the first season, Maurice Manson took over the role beginning in the second season and played Timberlake in four episodes spanning the rest of the series.
15	15	"Dennis and the Rare Coin"	Don Taylor	William Cowley & Peggy Chantler & Louella McFarlane	January 17, 1960
Mr. Wilson gets a call from New York City coin dealer John Hathaway and he would like to see George's collection. Alice is at the park with some other ladies to discuss the playground fund and she has a picnic lunch for Dennis. Dennis wants to go wading in the fountain, but Alice tells him there is a law against it. As a way to raise money for the fund, Alice suggests calling the fountain a wishing well and people can throw coins in there. Mr. Hathaway comes by to see George and George pays $250 for a rare gold coin. Martha, without realizing what it is, lets Dennis take it to use in the fountain wishing well. George searches for the coin, but does not tell Martha, because he does not want her to know how much he spent on it. George finds out from Dennis that he threw it into the fountain. Dennis tells George that he now gets a wish. George gets arrested for wading in the fountain looking for his coin. Everything gets straightened out at the police station and George gets his coin back. A Detective (James Anderson) comes in with Mr. Hathaway. Turns out that Hathaway is a con artist and he sold George a fake coin. George does get his check back. George had wished that Dennis would go on vacation for a week. His wish comes true in the end when he learns that Dennis is going to his Grandpa's for a week. Notes: While at the police station, Dennis mentions on his last visit he was given ice cream. He was referring to an early episode that already had been made, but was not aired until later the first season, called "Dennis Runs Away." Also, this is the first appearance of Sgt. Harold Mooney (George Cisar).
16	16	"Dennis and the Bike"	Charles Barton	William Cowley & Peggy Chantler	January 24, 1960
Henry tells Alice that Dennis left his scooter in the driveway and he ran over it. Henry says that until Dennis learns to take care of his things, they are not buying him another one. Dennis tells Tommy that he is going to ask his father for a bicycle. When he does, Henry and Alice say no. But, they agree that Dennis could have a bike if he gets it on his own. Margaret has a new bicycle, which she will let Dennis ride if he will play house with her. Dennis refuses. Later, Dennis comes home with Margaret's bike. She gave it to him as an engagement present. His parents make him take it back. It is very early in the morning and George finds Dennis riding his exercise bike in the back yard. Later, Dennis comes home with another kids bike that he won playing marbles. Next, Dennis tries winning a bike by entering a count the beans in a bowl contest at the hardware store. Henry and Alice want to surprise Dennis and count the beans themselves, but they run out of time. Tommy winds up winning the bike by just guessing the number of beans. Finally in the end, Henry takes Dennis shopping for a bike. Nesdon Booth as Sam. Ralph Sanford as Man in Park.
17	17	"Dennis and the Open House"	Don Taylor	Story by : Cally Curtis; Teleplay by : George Tibbles	February 7, 1960
The Mitchells are having an open house party to entertain one of Henry's clients, Mr. Malcolm Purdy (Grandon Rhodes). Dennis walks past a house that is for sale and asks the salesman if he could buy some of the flags. The man is annoyed and tells Dennis to leave. Mr. Wilson brings over his coin collection because Mr. Purdy is interested in coins. It is the time for the party and no one has shown up. Alice wonders if they are having trouble finding the house. Mr. Purdy arrives with his wife, Katherine. The Wilsons arrive. Malcom is admiring George's coin collection. Dennis wants to help people to be able to find the house. Dennis takes one of George's coins and offers to buy the open house sign at the home that is for sale. To get rid of Dennis, the salesman just gives him the sign. Dennis puts it in his front yard. Soon the house is over run with people who think that the house is for sale. The Purdys are annoyed by many of the people. George finds the one coin missing. Malcom thinks that George thinks that he took the coin. Malcom tells off Henry and starts to leave. Henry, Alice and the Purdys find out about the sign Dennis put up and Dennis admits he took the coin. In the end, everything works out. Dub Taylor as Opie Swanson. Marjorie Bennett as Open House Looker. Joe Conley as Open House Looker. Note: This was the fifth episode made and Margaret Wade's (Jeannie Russell) first episode, although several later episodes with her appearance air prior to this one.
18	18	"Dennis and the Duck"	William D. Russell	William Cowley & Peggy Chantler	February 14, 1960
Mr. Wilson is plagued by a duck that Dennis adopted when its original owner moved away. At first Dennis hides the duck from his parents. George comes by and complains about the damage caused to his garden and himself by Dennis' duck. Henry and Alice have no idea what he is talking about. Dennis reluctantly admits to having the duck and says he named it George. Henry helps Dennis build an enclosure for the duck. Dennis has been feeding his duck snails. The box they were in tipped over and they all escaped. George finds the snails in his yard and thinks he has found a new type of snail. Meanwhile, Dennis leaves the enclosure door open and the duck gets out. George wants to take a picture of the snails, but he finds the duck eating them. George complains to the Mitchells again. To prevent his parents from getting rid of the duck, Dennis tries to make them think that George has laid some eggs. Henry figures out they are store bought eggs. George sets a trap for the duck, but Freemont the dog gets caught in it. George tries using a duck call to lure the duck, but winds up with a yard full of other ducks. Note: This was the sixth episode made.
19	19	"Dennis and the Swing"	Charles Barton	George Tibbles & Paul West & David Schwartz	February 21, 1960
Henry is trying to get last minute work done. Alice shows Henry a picture of him pushing her on a swing. It was the day he proposed. Dennis now wants a swing in the backyard. Alice admits she was trying to find out what Henry was planning to do that evening for their anniversary. Henry completely forgot but tells Alice he is taking her to a fancy restaurant. He does manage to get a reservation at the restaurant. Meanwhile, Dennis is trying to find rope for his swing. Mr. Wilson is changing the dirt in his garden window box. George winds up with the dirt all over him when Dennis comes over looking for some rope. George is looking for the cat that Martha is taking care of for a friend. Dennis and Tommy get a board for the swing. They then try to help George catch the cat, but they chase it up a tree. The boys ask ice cream truck driver Mr. Johnson (William Newell) for help getting the cat down and putting up the swing rope. The ice cream trucks bells are bothering Henry, so he shuts the truck off. Alice finds out that Henry had just made the reservation, which was canceled, and is angry. The ice cream is melting and Mr. Johnson asks Henry to store his ice cream in Henry's freezer. Sgt. Mooney manages to get the cat out of the tree. Alice tries out Dennis' swing and her and Henry reminisce about the proposal.
20	20	"Dennis and the Dog"	Charles Barton	Phil Leslie	February 28, 1960
Neighbor Mr. Cooper has to go away for a while. Dennis asks his parents if he can take care of Mr. Cooper's dog Charlie while he is away. Dennis, Tommy and Charlie interrupt Mr. Wilson while he is working on one of his paintings. George is going to enter one of his paintings in the local art exhibit. Charlie accidentally paints over one of George's paintings with his tail and he throws that one away. That night, Charlie is lonely and wakes everyone up with his howling. There is some confusion as to where Dennis is. Alice lets Charlie sleep with Dennis. The next day, Charlie causes some damage to George's house. It is the night of the art exhibit and George hopes to win with a painting he spent a lot of time on. Ballard Fillmore is there as well. He won last year. The Judges are Frederick Timberlake (Byron Foulger) and Mrs. Elkins. Mr. Fillmore wins third prize and George wins second prize. The painting that wins is the one Charlie painted over, which Dennis dropped off earlier. The Judges decide that George will share first prize with Charlie. Doreen Lang as Miss Chroma. George DeNormand as Art Show Attendee.
21	21	"Mr. Wilson's Sister"	Charles Barton	William Cowley & Peggy Chantler	March 6, 1960
Helen Forbes (Mary Adams), Mr. Wilson's sister, comes for a visit. Dennis and Tommy get to meet her and she says she was a school teacher. Helen brings George a book he had as a child, Treasure Island. George tells the boys the book is about pirates and buried treasures. Helen tells them that there could even be buried treasure in the local area. George starts to read the book to the boys, but his eyes get tired. Helen reads more of the book to Dennis and Tommy, and they become fascinated with buried treasure. The days go on and Helen reads to an increasing number of boys. George draws a treasure map to trick the boys into tilling his garden plot. Alice and Henry do not want Dennis digging in George's yard, but he says it is OK. When the boys take a pick-axe to George's sidewalk, George has to show them the correct area to dig. Alice feels bad that the boys are working so hard and not finding anything. She has Henry bury some coins that came off of an old costume bracelet of hers. When George sees what the boys found, he gets excited. He uses the pick-axe and hits a water pipe. Henry has to tell George about the costume jewelry coins.
22	22	"Dennis and the TV Set"	Charles Barton	William Cowley & Peggy Chantler	March 13, 1960
Dennis notices that his friend Jeff Ellwood has his own TV set. Dennis goes home and asks for his own TV and both Henry and Alice turn him down. Henry is trying to fix the vacuum and Dennis keeps talking about the TV. When Henry blows a fuse because of the vacuum, he calls Opie Swanson (Dub Taylor), the repair man. Dennis still pesters Henry for a TV. Opie comes by and mentions that he set up a remote control for Mr. Wilson's TV. Dennis goes to George's house and has George show him how the remote works. Later, Alice catches Dennis watching George's TV from the guest room window with binoculars. Dennis rents Jeff's family TV remote. He and Tommy then turn on George's TV from the guest room window and turn up the volume. George wakes up from a nap and thinks his dog Freemont sat on the remote. George turns the TV off and Dennis turns it back on. This continues for a while until George unplugs the TV. George calls Opie and complains that the remote is running wild. Martha calls from her sister's house to see how George is and he tells her about the remote. Dennis tells his parents that he was using Jeff's remote to control George's TV. Martha comes back from her trip and her and Dennis find George napping. Martha wants to play a trick on George and turns on the TV with the remote. Her and Dennis hide in the closet. George thinks the remote's gone wild again and smashes it with his foot.
23	23	"Dennis Creates a Hero"	Charles Barton	William Cowley & Peggy Chantler	March 20, 1960
After Johnny Brady brags about all the great things his father has done, Dennis tries to see if Henry has done anything exciting and heroic. Alice, Henry and Dennis see that Mr. Brady got his picture in the paper for saving a small child from the path of a speeding car. Henry mentions how Charlie always manages to get attention. Dennis tries to talk the town newspaper publisher, Mr. Krinkie (Charles Seel) into putting Henry's picture in the paper and make him a hero. Krinkie tells Dennis that the picture is just not news worthy. Martha lends Dennis her old Box camera. Dennis borrows Tommy's bear skin rug and the two go to Mr. Wilson's house. Dennis wants George to wear the rug. Dennis would then take a picture of Henry saving Tommy from a bear. Martha thinks George should help Dennis make Henry a hero. George, Dennis and Tommy find Henry napping in a hammock in the backyard. Alice sees George in the bear skin and hits him on the head with a flower pot and ruins Dennis' chance for a picture. Meanwhile a reporter gives Krinkie a story and picture about a guy who stole from a church. Krinkie agrees to hold on to the old picture Dennis had of Henry. Through a mix-up, Henry does get his picture in the paper. But as the thief who stole from the church and is called "The most contemptible man of the year".
24	24	"Dennis' Paper Drive"	Charles Barton	Story by : William Cowley & Peggy Chantler & Arthur Marx and Mannie Manheim; Teleplay by : William Cowley & Peggy Chantler	April 10, 1960
Mrs. Holland tells Dennis and Tommy that the boy that collects the most papers for the charity drive will win a silver dollar. Meanwhile, Martha has gone to visit her mother. Mr. Wilson's sister, June, is staying with him. She gives George some parsnip soup that he hates and he pours it on a sickly plant of his. The boys ask George for his old papers, but he tells them he gave them to Johnny Brady. George goes to look for more papers at his sister's request and the boys switch the sick plant for a good one. George sees the healthy plant and thinks the soup did it. The next morning, Dennis brings a sleeping George his paper so he can read it right away. George is angry telling Dennis that will be seeing his parents hoping that Dennis will be punished. Later in the morning Dennis is anxious for him and his parents to get to church as Mrs. Holland arrives to walk over to church with them. Then George comes to the Mitchell house to complain and Mrs. Holland is there. Dennis' father then punishes Dennis by having him stay in his room the entire day after church making George satisfied. Then Mrs. Holland shows George the coin she is giving away, a rare silver dollar. At home, George reads that the coin could be worth $600. He is determined to make sure that Dennis wins the prize so that he can get the silver dollar. He then returns to the Mitchell house and convinces Dennis' father to lift his punishment. Then George tells the boys they can store the papers in his garage. June does not like that George is going to cheat the boys and Mrs. Holland. The boys win the contest. Thanks to June, George will buy the boys each a new bike. George's conscience gets to him and he will keep the coin and write a $600 check to the charity. Note: Nancy Evans appears in this and the next episode as June Wilson, George's sister, who visits while Martha is out of town visiting her mother. This was the first of seven consecutive episodes in which Sylvia Field does not appear, and eight out of nine to end the first season. The only exception, "Dennis Runs Away," was filmed early in the first season but held because of editing issues.
25	25	"Dennis and the Bees"	Charles Barton	Phil Leslie	April 17, 1960
Dennis and Tommy visit local handyman Opie Swanson at his fix-it shop. Opie has a lot of bee hives behind his shop. Opie tells the boys that due to the late spring, the bees have not made much honey. Dennis and Tommy would like to help. They go to see Mr. Wilson, who is feeding his camellias. George has been cross-breeding the flowers to develop a new strain. Dennis notices that the bees are avoiding the camellias because they do not smell. To help the bees find honey Dennis sprays perfume on George's camellias. George and his sister June notice how nice the flowers smell. George of course gets carried away thinking he has developed a rare flower that will make him a fortune. He enlists Merrivale the Florist to help sell them. Dennis and Tommy come by and pester Merrivale about leaving his nursery windows open so the bees can get in. George tells Henry and Alice about his flowers and how Merrivale knows Mark Stacy (Addison Richards), a wealthy friend who might invest in their business. Stacy is due to arrive at George's house very soon. Dennis and Tommy tell George and Merrivale how they have been spraying the flowers with perfume. Stacy arrives and George tries to tell him about the mistake he made with the flowers. Turns out Stacy is not interested in the flowers, but rather George's homemade nerve tonic.
26	26	"Alice's Birthday"	Charles Barton	George Tibbles	April 24, 1960
Henry will be out of town for Alice's birthday, which is the next day. He gives Dennis some money to buy her a present. Dennis and Tommy ask Mr. Wilson where they could go, that is close, to buy a present. George sends them down to Finch's (Charles Lane) drug store to shop for his mother. Finch is concerned when he sees the boys walk into the store. But his attitude changes when Dennis says he wants to buy 20 presents. The boys accidentally start a self-inflating rubber raft. This causes a lot of destruction in the store. Mrs. Williams (Molly Dodd), who works at the store, tries to help the boys. The boys wind up causing some more problems. Dennis is sad when he only has enough money for one present. Dennis sees a Sandwich Sign Man advertising for Finch's store. He puts a sign on telling people to get his mother birthday presents. Mrs. Biddy (Kathryn Card) sees Dennis in front of Finch's store with the sign. She thinks Finch is violating child labor laws and calls the police. George comes by and Mrs. Biddy and Finch think he put Dennis up to it. Henry comes home because it turns out he did not have to make his trip after all. He gets a call from Sgt. Mooney about Dennis. Henry and Alice race to Finch's store where everything is explained. Eleanor Audley as Mrs. Pompton.
27	27	"Dennis Becomes a Baby Sitter"	Charles Barton	Story by : Hannibal Coons & Dick Wesson; Teleplay by : Hannibal Coons & Dick Wesson & William Cowley & Peggy Chantler	May 1, 1960
Dennis needs to earn some money to buy some pet mice. Dennis goes to Mr. Wilson's house to see if there is any job he might have for him to do. While there, one of the mice gets out of the cage. Dennis catches the mouse, but messes up George's chess board. Meanwhile, Henry hires a sitter for Dennis for that evening. George tells Henry that he is having dinner with chess champion Monsieur Boucher and his wife, Madame Boucher (Hanna Landy). The problem is that they brought their son Michel with. George arranged for a babysitter for Michel. Henry suggests Michel stay with Dennis. Henry and Mr. Wilson mistakenly both cancel their respective sitters. Michel is dropped off at the Mitchell house. Another misunderstanding causes the boys to be left alone. Dennis decides to be the babysitter. The Mitchell's and their guest run into George and the Bouchers at the same restaurant. There they discover that both sitters were cancelled. They race back to the house only to find everything is OK. Dennis gets paid the money he needs for the mice. Note: This was the seventh episode made, but was held for later airing because of editing issues.
28	28	"Dennis and the Starlings"	Charles Barton	William Cowley & Peggy Chantler	May 8, 1960
Mr. Wilson has a yard full of starlings that he desperately wants to get rid of. George's birthday is the next day and Dennis wants to give him a loaf of bread to feed the starlings as a gift. While trying to scare the birds away, Mr. Wilson locks himself out of his house. Alice suggests the neighborhood chip in and hire a professional to get rid of the birds. Meanwhile, Miss Cathcart is detaining Mr. Dorfman and he would like to get back to his route. George wants to hire Mr. Prince (Forrest Lewis) to do the job. Mr. Prince has a record that when played will make the starlings fly away. Dennis learns that Mr. Wilson does not want the birds around. Dennis wants to help, so he puts liver up in the tree thinking that will make the birds leave. The next day, Miss Cathcart, Mr. Prince and the Mitchells meet at George's house. Before Mr. Prince can play the record, Dennis accidentally breaks it. To cheer everyone up, Miss Cathcart sings a song, and her voice drives the starlings away. Mr. Wilson, thinking he will have peace and quiet, now must deal with a tree full of meowing cats who went there for the liver.
29	29	"The Party Line"	Charles Barton	William Cowley & Peggy Chantler & George Tibbles	May 15, 1960
Henry tells Alice that Ed and Catherine Driscoll (Arthur Hanson & June Dayton) will be their new neighbors. Ed is the manager of a plastics company and might be a good business prospect for Henry's firm. Meanwhile, the Mitchell's party line is constantly being tied up. What they do not know is that Dennis and his friends are in the empty Driscoll house and have been playing with the phone for days. Moving men Floyd (Gregory Walcott) and Joe (Morgan Jones) come by the house. The men tell the boys that the Driscolls will be moving in soon. Mr. Driscoll comes by and tells Dennis and Tommy he has a son their age. Ed calls his wife and Henry gets on the line and reminds him it is a party line. Henry is talking to his boss Mr. Hall (J. Edward McKinley), who tells Henry he should go and meet Mr. Driscoll. Ed gets on the line and complains about the line being tied up. Henry and Mr. Hall do not know it is Driscoll. Dennis and Tommy meet the Driscoll boy, Terry. Henry comes over, introduces himself and invites the Driscolls over for dinner. Alice is on the phone and is interrupted by Ed and this time Henry tells him off. The Driscolls are at the Mitchell house and Ed and Henry tell each other about the trouble they are each having with their party line. After Dennis explains a few things, the men realize they were the ones who were having phone problems with each other. The Driscolls leave. Later, Ed and Henry apologize to each other. Note: Mr. and Mrs. Wilson do not appear in this episode. This is the last episode until "The Big Basketball Game" in season 4 that does not include either a Mr. or Mrs. Wilson character.
30	30	"Dennis by Proxy"	Charles Barton	George Tibbles	May 22, 1960
Dennis and Tommy hear that the city is tearing down Mr. Dorfman's "Postman's Rest" bench in favor of a parking lot. Dennis and Tommy have also found two rubber stamps behind Quigley's Market. They have to make a deal with Margaret to borrow her ink pads. Dennis asks Mr. Wilson for some wood so he can build Mr. Dorfman another bench, but George has none to spare. Dennis finds out that a Mrs. Toland (Amy Douglass) has bought the house next to Mr. Wilson. Dennis asks her for some materials to build the bench and she says he may have what he wants. Dennis and Stewart cause some problems for Mr. Sanderson (Hugh Sanders) at Quigley's market and Quigley calls Alice. Dennis' throat starts to hurt and the doctor wants him to stay in the house for a few days. Dennis has to watch from his room as Tommy, Margaret and Stewart start to build the bench. Stewart steps all over George's newly concreted patio trying to find some wood. Later, Margaret also messes up George's concrete. Alice gives Dennis the OK to go outside. The bench is finished and the kids ask George to test it out. He sits on it and it falls apart. Mrs. Toland finds a way to make George build Mr. Dorfman a new bench.
31	31	"Dennis Runs Away"	William D. Russell	William Cowley & Peggy Chantler	May 29, 1960
Dennis has nobody to play with after Joey goes home. He asks Mr. Wilson to play, but George has to wash the windows and then is going bowling. Henry is going golfing. Police Chief Foster Stewart (Ned Wever) calls George about picking him up for the bowling tournament. Dennis would like to visit his Grandfather, but Alice will be hosting a Bridge game at the house and cannot drive him. Dennis packs a bag and decides to walk to his Grandfather's house, despite it being 40 miles away. Officer Osborn stops Dennis and asks him if he is lost. Officer Holt (James Callahan) then says if Dennis comes to the police station, he can have some ice cream. At the station, Dennis will not give them his name and they think he is a runaway. To gain his trust, Chief Stewart lets Dennis handcuff his ankles together. Dennis drops the keys down a drain on the floor. As it is afternoon already, Dennis tells Chief Stewart that he is going home. Stewart is surprised when Dennis says he only lives two blocks away. When George finds out that Stewart will not make the tournament, he gets excited as he believes he now has a chance to win. But his hopes are dashed when he finds out Dennis filled the holes in his bowling ball with wood cement. Note: This was the fourth episode made, but was held for later airing because of editing issues. Billy Booth appeared but was not called "Tommy" even though the character of Tommy Anderson already was established. This is the final appearance in the series of Joey McDonald, who was played by Gil Smith, although he occasionally was mentioned in the second season and as late as the fourth-season episode "First Editions."
32	32	"Miss Cathcart's Sunsuit"	Norman Abbott	William Cowley & Peggy Chantler	June 12, 1960
Dennis annoys Mr. Wilson while he is going to wash his dog, Freemont. Dennis and Tommy ask Mr. Gibson (Cyril Delevanti), who owns a gift shop, if they can have whatever is in his garbage cans and he says yes. The boys find a bunch of Valentine's Day cards and want to sell them. The boys meet Mr. Carlson (Tyler McVey), a gardener, who is going to do some work for the Mitchells. Dennis and Tommy's efforts to sell the cards in July cause problems and misunderstandings for Miss Cathcart, Mr. Dorfman, George, and even Mr. Carlson. George buys the rest of Dennis' cards, hoping to avoid more trouble. Because of something that Dennis and Tommy did earlier, now all the teenagers in the town want Valentine's cards, causing a run on them. They all go to George's house and then some newspaper men show up for a story. George even winds up in trouble with the police. Sue Lyon as Blonde with Valentine Card.

=== Season 2 (1960–61) ===
Strangely, most episodes in this season replace the 1960 Screen Gems logo with the 1955 Screen Gems logo, with the exception of Episode 4 of this season, which is the only Season 2 episode to use the 1960 Screen Gems logo. The next 2 seasons replace the 1955 Screen Gems logo with the 1960 Screen Gems logo. Instead of 32 episodes in the season again, this season has 38.

No. overall	No. in season	Title	Directed by	Written by	Original release date
33	1	"Out of Retirement"	William D. Russell	William Cowley & Peggy Chantler	October 2, 1960
Mr. Wilson and Dennis are playing hide and seek and George gets stuck in his closet. While Henry is helping him get out, George tells him that his old boss, Mr. Cramer (Vinton Hayworth), is coming to town. George is doing his Fred Astaire imitation for Martha and Mr. Cramer comes to the door. Mr. Cramer offers George an executive position at his old company, but it will require him to relocate to Pittsburgh. George agrees to think about. George has a frustrating encounter with Dennis. He says that if they move to Pittsburgh, it will be because of Dennis. Dennis overhears George say this. Dennis does not want him to go and he and Tommy try to think of a way to make him stay. In order to keep George from moving, Dennis decides to run away from home. Dennis leaves a note for George and George tells Henry and Alice. They call the police and George offers a $100 reward. Dennis is at Tommy's house. Officers bring little blond boys to the Mitchell home, but none are Dennis. Dennis and Tommy hear about the reward on the radio and that the Wilsons are not moving. Dennis comes home.
34	2	"Dennis and the Wedding"	William D. Russell	Louella MacFarlane	October 9, 1960
Mr. Wilson has termites in the basement and is fumigating them. George's niece Georgiana Balanger (Elinor Donahue) is marrying Lt. Robert Lee Black. George will host the ceremony at his house. Georgiana and Bob arrive and she would like Dennis to be her ring bearer. It is time for the wedding rehearsal and George is worried about Dennis being involved. Because of Dennis, the ring drops down a vent in the floor, but Dennis does find it in the basement. Miss Cathcart (Mary Wickes) comes in singing and her terrible voice causes the bottle with the termite killer to break apart. The fumes now fill the house and everyone has to leave. It is the day of the wedding and George is a bundle of nerves. Despite that, the wedding comes off smoothly. But when Georgiana and Bob drive off, Dennis is in the back seat of their car. Jonathan Hole as Mr. Bradshaw. Irene Tedrow as Lucy Elkins. Morris Ankrum as Minister. Note: Despite the appearances of two of Mr. Wilson's sisters and mentions of Mrs. Wilson's mother and at least two sisters in the first season, as well as the existence of George Wilson's brother John, Mr. Wilson refers to himself and Martha being "the only family (his niece) has left" as the reason why they are hosting the wedding.
35	3	"Dennis and the Radio Set"	William D. Russell	James Fonda	October 16, 1960
Mr. Wilson is watching a Charity Auction that is being held on the town's picnic grounds. Dennis comes by and causes George to accidentally bid on an old radio set. George gives the radio to Dennis. The radio turns out to have a large number of cash hidden inside. Henry suggests that Dennis and George split the money. Dennis thinks that they should try and find the original owner. George agrees as he does not believe they will find the owner anyway. Henry and George put a very non-specific ad in the paper. But Dennis tells Mr. Krinkie (Charles Seel) a lot more details about the radio and the number of money. Expecting to eventually get some of the money, George buys an electric golf cart. Mr. Brown (Norman Leavitt) sees Krinkie's story and comes to the Mitchell house. Mr. Brown has all the details and Henry is about to give him the money. Dennis finds a way to prove that Brown is not the owner. Miss Douglas (Ellen Corby) comes by and is able to prove she is the rightful owner. She gives Dennis a reward. Hal Smith as Auctioneer. Ronald Long as Newscaster. Ollie O'Toole as Man.
36	4	"Dennis and the Ham-pher"	William D. Russell	Phil Leslie	October 23, 1960
Dennis' friend Mickey gives him what he thinks is a hamster. Dennis does not know it, but it is actually a gopher. Henry and Alice agree to let Dennis keep a hamster. When he goes to show them the pet, it has gotten out of the cage. Mr. Wilson reminds Henry about their upcoming fishing trip. George sees one of his plants destroyed and knows he has a gopher in the yard. Everyone now realizes that Dennis' pet is the gopher. George sets a trap for the animal and so does Dennis. Dennis thinks he has trapped the gopher and goes to get George. Tommy tells Dennis that it is Mrs. Elkins' cat in the trap and the boys leave. Mrs. Elkins comes by and thinks George trapped her cat. George tries to flood the gopher out of its hole, not knowing it is not in there. He also does not know he is flooding his basement. George traps the gopher in his garage. Mrs. Wilson pulls up in her car and Dennis and Tommy open the garage door, letting out the gopher. The gopher finally gets caught. George and Henry start packing the car for their fishing trip. They plan to take the gopher with and let it loose by the lake. George accidentally knocks the cage over and the gopher gets free.
37	5	"The Stock Certificate"	William D. Russell	Phil Leslie	October 30, 1960
Mr. Wilson finds a stock certificate worth $500 and intends to sell it to Mr. Clark. Dennis and Tommy come by and George hides the stock in his phone book. The boys tell George he is now the president of their tree house club. Back at home, the Delivery Man (Hal Hopper) brings Alice a new phone book and takes the old one. Knowing George is taking a bath and does not want to be disturbed, Dennis follows the Delivery Man to the Wilson house. There Dennis swaps the new book for George's old one. While Dennis takes the old book to the truck, the stock falls out. Dennis wants to use the stock to decorate the tree house. George is looking for his stock and finds out about the new book. George and Henry go to the warehouse where the books are stored and find thousands of books there. Dennis and Tommy go to help and Dennis causes the men to have to start all over. Dennis had borrowed a magazine from George and Alice tells him to put it back. Martha looks through the magazine and finds the stock. Martha believes George put it there and just forgot. She shows George and he admits to being forgetful. Dennis tells them that he found the stock while dumping the old phone book. Now George knows he was right in the first place. Mr. Clark comes by and offers George $700 for the stock. Guy Raymond as Warehouse Man.
38	6	"Man of the House"	William D. Russell	Louella MacFarlane	November 6, 1960
With Henry away on a business trip and Alice sick in bed with a cold, Dennis has to be the "man of the house". Henry tells Alice that he hired Mrs. Rafferty (Olive Carey), a cleaning woman, to come by and help. Alistair St. Clair (Alan Hewitt), comes to the house with a sales pitch about a free dinner for eight if they watch a sales demonstration. Alice has a hard time getting rid of him. A bunch of Dennis' friends come and have something to eat in the kitchen. Mrs. Rafferty arrives. After seeing all the children, she quickly quits without Alice knowing. Because he wants someone to help him clean, Dennis has Margaret come over to play house. They try to do the laundry and the washing machine winds up overflowing. Dennis gets Mr. Wilson to help. George burns a curtain while he tries to iron it. Alice mentions to Dennis about having the leftover chicken for dinner. But that was the food that his friends ate. Alistair calls the house with his dinner offer and Dennis tells him to come over. The Cook (Mary Treen) and Waiter arrive and prepare the meal. They are both surprised to see that the eight guests are all children. Alistair arrives for his demonstration and sees the children. Later that night, Dennis blows a fuse in the house and Alice calls George. Henry comes home early and thinks that George is an intruder. Note: Sylvia Field does not appear in this episode.
39	7	"The Rock Collection"	William D. Russell	William Cowley & Peggy Chantler	November 13, 1960
To shoo Dennis away, Mr. Wilson suggests he starts rock collecting. George offers a contest for Dennis and his friends. He will give $1 to the boy who finds the most different kinds of rocks in one week. At the same time, he is trying to sell a scruffy real estate lot nearby. Henry has a friend, Charlie Dobbs (Don Dillaway), that works for a mining company. He hopes to get some samples of gold ore from Charlie for Dennis' collection. Henry does get a box full of valueless gold ore from Charlie. Knowing that Dennis is going to look for rocks on George's vacant lot, Henry decides to spread the samples there. Joe (Jess Kirkpatrick) and Harriet Schubert (Claire Carleton) are looking at George's lot. Dennis shows Joe the gold rocks he found and Joe thinks the lot has much more gold to dig up. Joe calls up George and wants to come by to close the deal. A Mr. Timpkin (Thomas Browne Henry) calls George as well. The Schubert's arrive and offer George a large number of money. George wants to see what Timpkin has to say. Dennis comes by and shows George the gold and George turns down the Schubert's offer. Henry tells George that the gold is worthless and he put it there. The Schubert's leave. Mr. Timpkin knew the gold was worthless and still wants to buy the lot at a much lower price.
40	8	"Henry and Togetherness"	William D. Russell	William Cowley & Peggy Chantler	November 20, 1960
Dennis tells Mr. Wilson that he is going to stay over at Tommy's house that night. Dennis and Tommy want to know if George would like to come over and he says no. Back at his house, Dennis drops and breaks the cookie jar. Henry tells him if he breaks one more thing, he cannot stay over at Tommy's. Up in his room Dennis swings a bat and knocks a leak in his fish tank. While Tommy is catching the water with Dennis' shoes, Dennis goes to look for something else to catch the water with. George tricks Henry out of playing golf so that he will spend more time with Dennis. That should keep Dennis away from the Wilson house. Henry tries to play catch with Dennis and Dennis keeps running back into the house to help Tommy. Margaret comes over and she is chewing bubble gum. Dennis agrees to play house with her the next day if she gives him her gum. Dennis plugs up the leak with the gum. That night, the Mitchells are hosting a party. Dennis leaves for Tommy's house. They are using Dennis' room as a cloak room. George goes to the room to drop off his coat and new hat. He sees the gum turning into a large bubble. It bursts and he has to use his new hat to catch the water.
41	9	"Paint-up, Clean-up Week"	William D. Russell	Dick Conway & Roland MacLane	November 27, 1960
The town holds a Paint-up, Clean-up Week campaign, and everyone spruces up their place. Mr. Wilson is chairman for the block and the best block will win an award. When Dennis and Tommy hear George talking about Dennis' tree house, they decide to fix it up as well. The boys move a large quilt over the tree house and wind up dropping a large number of leaves and stuffing in George's yard. Dennis and Tommy want to help George, but he wants them out of the way. George gives Dennis a bucket of red paint for his wagon to keep him busy. Dennis spills the paint on the curb in front of Mr. Wilson's house. The boys decide to paint the rest of the curb to make it look better. Sgt. Mooney comes by and George gets blamed for it. Mooney takes George to the Police Station. Henry and Dennis clean up the paint and apologize to George. The next morning, there are more leaves in George's yard and the inspection committee will be there soon. Dennis and Tommy help rake them up. Mrs. Schooner tells George that his block has won the award. The Mitchell's win the best house award because of Dennis' tree house. Something Dennis does causes the committee's car to be towed away. Elizabeth Harrower as Mrs. Smith. Note: This episode along with two others, "Mr. Wilson's Uncle" and "Community Picnic" was transcribed by Hank Ketcham into a special edition comic book called "Dennis the Menace Television Special".
42	10	"Dennis Learns to Whistle"	William D. Russell	Story by : James Fonda; Teleplay by : Phil Leslie	December 4, 1960
Buzzy Hampton (Barry Gordon) tells Dennis and Tommy that they can play Indian scout with him and the guys. But they have to be able to whistle and Dennis does not know how. Dennis asks Mr. Wilson to teach him how to whistle. George tells Dennis to eat something sour to help him pucker. After Dennis leaves, George admits to Martha that he cannot whistle either. When eating a lemon does not work, Dennis goes to Mr. Quigley's (Willard Waterman) market to find something else. Quigley gives Dennis some green cherries. Dennis overhears George tell Quigley that he cannot whistle and Quigley laughs at George. George and Dennis try to think of something else besides whistling. They turn on the TV and there is a group of boys whistling. That night, Dennis loses a tooth. The next morning, Dennis eats a sour cherry and he starts to whistle. Dennis gives George a cherry. George bites down on a cherry pit and loses a filling. George can now whistle. George and Dennis go on the TV show and whistle with the boys. Irene Tedrow as Mrs. Elkins. Note: This episode marks Robert John Pittman's first appearance in the series, though he was not yet credited as Seymour. He appeared as Harold's little brother in "Dennis' Allowance" and Rikki in "Dennis Goes to Camp" and did not play Seymour until "The Fortune Cookie."
43	11	"The Raffle Ticket"	William D. Russell	Hannibal Coons & James Fonda	December 18, 1960
Dennis gets a bean pot stuck on his head. Because Henry is not around, Alice gets Mr. Wilson to drive her and Dennis into town. George is conducting a car raffle for his lodge. He is counting on Henry to sell a bunch. Dennis buys a ticket from George to win the car for his mother. George comes by the Mitchell house and after quite a long time, Henry reluctantly agrees to try and sell some tickets. Despite not being able to afford it, Henry buys Alice a new car. He arranges to have it dropped off at the house and have it hidden in the garage as a surprise. Knowing Henry hates to sell tickets, Dennis and Tommy decide to sell them for him. The boys sell all of theirs and George gives them some more. Mrs. Courtland (Lurene Tuttle) wants to buy a ticket from Dennis. Because the boys sold their second batch, Dennis goes to George's house and takes one from the pile that George got stuck buying himself. It is time for the drawing and Mr. Petry (Harry Cheshire) has Margaret pick the winner. Mrs. Courtland wins the car with what would have been George's ticket. She is so grateful to Dennis, she gives him her old car, a Baker Electric to give to his mother. They put the car in the garage. Henry and Alice are surprised when they see the car. Just then, the Car Salesman pulls up with Alice's new car. Lucille Wall as Mrs. McCrory.
44	12	"The Christmas Horse"	William D. Russell	William Cowley & Peggy Chantler	December 25, 1960
Its Christmas day and Dennis is disappointed that Santa did not bring him the horse he asked for. Mr. Wilson tries to get a tree from Mr. McGuire (Ernest Truex) at a discount because it is Christmas day. Mr. McGuire makes him pay full price and tells George that he is retiring. Dennis and Tommy bring presents to the Wilsons. Margaret tells Dennis she has seen a horse and will tell him where if he looks at her doll. She tells Dennis that Johnny Fleming, another boy in the neighborhood, has gotten a pony. Dennis heads there to claim it, certain Santa must have delivered it to the wrong house. Mr. Flemming (Henry Beckman) tries to show Johnny how tame the pony is, but the boy is afraid of it. Johnny tells Dennis he will trade the pony for a typewriter. Dennis trades his new record player for Margaret's typewriter. Mr. Wade (Stuart Nisbet) comes by and tells Henry and Alice what Dennis did and that he is trying to get a pony. Henry calls Mr. Flemming and tells him what Dennis is trying to do. Dennis returns the gifts he traded. Dennis asks Mr. McGuire if he ever thought about selling his horse, Mercury. Mr. McGuire comes up with a scheme to let Dennis think Mercury is his horse, but it will stay on the McGuire farm. The Mitchells, the Wilsons and Mr. McGuire go for a hayride. They sing Silent Night and Dennis finishes the song himself. Irene Vernon as Mrs. Flemming.
45	13	"Dennis' Allowance"	William D. Russell	Budd Grossman	January 1, 1961
Dennis asks his father for an allowance of $.25 per week. Henry says he will give it to him with the condition that he first learns the value of money by earning it himself. Mr. Wilson is looking forward to his college fraternity reunion that afternoon and bought new clothes for the occasion. Dennis comes to the Wilson house with a bucket of water hoping to wash their windows. George gives him a quarter just to go away. George then steps in the bucket and ruins his new shoes. Dennis and Tommy start a dog washing service. That does not go well when George's dog Freemont runs away from the boys and gets soap all over George's new suit. The boys then open a golf course in Dennis' front yard. Henry puts a stop to that and tells Dennis to give everyone their money back. To fill up the holes they put in the front yard, Dennis and Tommy want to start a pet cemetery. Henry says no. The boys then want to auction off junk they have found and wind up filling Henry's garage with stuff. Henry calls two junk dealers, but instead of buying the stuff, they want to charge Henry to haul it away. Henry learns giving Dennis an allowance would have been cheaper in the long run.
46	14	"Dennis' Penny Collection"	William D. Russell	Hannibal Coons	January 8, 1961
Dennis has been collecting various things and Henry suggests that he take up penny collecting. They will ask Mr. Wilson for some advice. George will gladly help Dennis, hoping it will preoccupy him quietly indoors. Early the next morning, Henry finds Dennis in the kitchen gathering empty bottles. Dennis takes the bottles to Mr. Quigley and he gives Dennis rolls of pennies. Dennis wants to count the pennies and spills them all over. At home, Dennis finds that none of the pennies are ones he can use, so he goes back to Quigley for different rolls. Quigley has to go in back to get different rolls and leaves his cash register open. Dennis wants to look at a penny in the register and George stops him. George sets off an alarm. Later, Dennis and Tommy ask George to drive them to the drug store to get different pennies. George takes them to the bank instead. George asks Dennis to put a penny in the parking meter. The boys try and get a different penny and meanwhile George gets a parking ticket. Dennis tries to get into an armored car to look for pennies. In the course of trying to stop Dennis, Mr. Wilson gets arrested because it appears as though he is trying to break in. Things gets straightened out at the police station and George gets a rare penny.
47	15	"Dennis, the Campaign Manager"	William D. Russell	Louella MacFarlane	January 15, 1961
Alice tells the Wilsons that the park playground is now only open on weekends by order of the Park Commissioner. George calls T. H. Thorndike, the commissioner, but gets no results. Alice suggests that George run for commissioner in the upcoming election. Henry reluctantly agrees to be George's campaign manager. Dennis and Tommy are making campaign signs. Dennis goes to the local TV station and talks to Miss Rawlings (Jane Nigh), the program director. He convinces her to put Mr. Wilson on the "Around The Town" show. Miss Rawlings calls George and because of a misunderstanding, she thinks that Dennis is the manager. While thanking Henry, George finds out it was Dennis that spoke to Miss Rawlings. The next day Miss Rawlings and Mike Thompson (Walter Reed), the host of the TV show, arrive at the Wilsons' home with the camera crew. Just as they are starting the show, angry neighbors burst in, complaining of Dennis's campaign signs that have been placed all over their properties. Many of them saying they would not vote for George. Miss Cathcart comes in and sings a campaign song for George which winds up cracking the camera lens. Despite George withdrawing from the race, he gets a lot of write-in votes. Thorndike wins and says that the park will remain open during the week. And a pool will be built across from George's property. Elizabeth Harrower as Mrs. Johnson.
48	16	"Miss Cathcart's Friend"	William D. Russell	Arnold Peyser & Lois Peyser	January 22, 1961
Miss Cathcart keeps TV repairman Maurice from his work by flirting with him. Thanks to Dennis and Alice showing up, Maurice is able to get out of the house. Later, Alice mentions to Dennis it would be nice if Miss Cathcart had a best friend. Alice and Dennis drive Mr. Wilson to see Leo Trinkle (Mel Blanc of cartoon fame) at the dog pound. George's dog Freemont was mistakenly taken in. While there, Dennis sees a dog named Arthur. Dennis and Tommy tell Miss Cathcart that they would like to get her a friend named Arthur. The boys say they will bring Arthur over for dinner. They get the dog from the pound. Meanwhile, Arthur Prilych (John Zaremba), the dog's owner, is looking for him at the pound. Leo gives Mr. Prilych Miss Cathcart's address. Mr. Prilych gets to her house before Dennis brings the dog over to her. She mistakenly thinks that the man is the friend instead of the dog. Dennis and Tommy arrive with the dog, whose real name is Zambesi. Things get straightened out. Arthur gets his dog back and Miss Cathcart goes back to pursuing Maurice.
49	17	"Pythias Was a Piker"	William D. Russell	Phil Leslie	January 29, 1961
Dennis tells Mr. Wilson that he is writing a school composition entitled "My Best Friend" and it will be about him. George is very busy and rudely tells Dennis to go away. Mrs. Elkins, who is looking for her cat, hears what George said to Dennis. She berates George for treating Dennis that way. Martha hears Mrs. Elkins tell everyone at the grocery store what George did and that he hates kids. Martha reminds George that Dennis is to read his paper in front of the class and their parents. George now thinks it would be good publicity for him. But now Dennis has several other people that he may use as his best friend. Alice and Henry try to explain to Dennis the qualities of a good friend. George takes Dennis and Tommy to a store and buys them a bunch of presents to get on Dennis' good side. Because he did not tell Alice where he was going, Dennis has to sit in the corner for an hour. George offers to sit for Dennis. Dennis shows Mrs. Elkins how George is sitting in the corner and she gets a big laugh out of it. George is afraid she will tell everyone what she saw. Dennis writes about George and reads it to the class and the parents. Because of something Dennis did at school, he has to sit in the corner. Dennis gets George to take his place. Claudia Bryar as Miss Morrison, the Teacher.
50	18	"Dennis and the Saxophone"	William D. Russell	William Cowley & Peggy Chantler	February 5, 1961
Tommy has a saxophone that he does not want, but Dennis would like it. Meanwhile, with summer break coming soon, George wants to make sure he has a vacation booked so there will be less time with Dennis around. Dennis tells Mrs. Anderson (Jean Howell) that he would like to buy the saxophone, but he will have to talk to his father. When George learns that Dennis is going to ask Henry to buy it for him, George finds a way to talk Henry out of it. The next day, Dennis asks Henry again for the saxophone, but Henry does not want to spoil Dennis. While looking through travel brochures, George finds a camp for boys. He figures if he can get Dennis to go there for two weeks, he and Martha can stay home and have peace and quiet. George and Dennis come up with a plan to ask Henry about the camp, with Mr. Wilson telling Henry he will cover half the cost. But the plan backfires, when Dennis asks for the saxophone instead.
51	19	"Wilson Sleeps Over"	William D. Russell	Budd Grossman	February 12, 1961
The Wilsons are planning to fumigate their home to get rid of termites. Dennis comes by and shows George his pet frog, Sam. Sam jumps through George's basement window. While looking for Sam, Dennis accidentally knocks over the bottle which will fumigate the Wilsons' house. So, the Wilsons plan to stay at the Mitchells' for the night. Dennis learns that Mr. Wilson has been known to walk in his sleep. He tells his friends and they come over while George is napping. When nothing happens, Dennis tells his friends he will try to take a picture of Mr. Wilson that night walking in his sleep. That night, Tommy sneaks over to Dennis' house and they witness Mr. Wilson walking in his sleep. Alice realizes that George is not in his bed. A Police Officer (Don C. Harvey), that had stopped Tommy earlier, comes to the Mitchell house. A search for Tommy, Dennis and George ends happily.
52	20	"Dennis' Birthday"	William D. Russell	Louella MacFarlane	February 19, 1961
Mr. Wilson is in charge of getting a celebrity for a lodge party benefit. If he cannot find one, he plans on doing his magic act to fill in. Dennis stops by the Wilson house and sees George practicing his act. Dennis misunderstands something George says and believes George will do his magic act at Dennis's birthday party. Dennis goes to his friend Herbie's house. There he runs into actress Spring Byington (who had starred on CBS' December Bride from 1954-59), who is related to Herbie's mother. Spring agrees to come to the birthday party. Mr. Wilson tells Dennis that he cannot come to the party as he will be visiting his relatives, Jim (Vaughn Taylor) and Edna (Elvia Allman). But when George learns that Spring will be at the party, he decides to go. At the party, Spring agrees to assist George with one of his magic tricks, but things go wrong. Despite what happened, she agrees to appear at the lodge party.
53	21	"Dennis Goes to Camp"	William D. Russell	Phil Leslie	February 26, 1961
Mr. Wilson wants to have Dennis sent to a summer camp and will try and talk the Mitchells into it. But Henry has already agreed to have Dennis go and will take him to a camp open house the next day. A last minute business trip comes up and Henry cannot take Dennis to the camp. George agrees to take Dennis instead. He then learns there will be six kids going. Once there, Mr. Wilson meets the head of the camp, Fred Harmon. George gets yelled at by Charles' Mother (Mary Beth Hughes), a boy who mistakenly gets into the boys cabin. The boys exhaust George with a day of long hikes and activity. As they prepare to return home, they are told they will be stranded there for a week because a storm has taken out a bridge.
54	22	"Dennis' Tool Chest"	William D. Russell	Story by : Hannibal Coons; Teleplay by : William Conley	March 5, 1961
Mr. Wilson opens his car trunk to take out a jack to change his tire. Dennis tells George that he wishes he had a tool chest. While no one is looking, Mrs. Cathcart's cat jumps in and then Dennis closes the trunk. Mr. Wilson cannot figure out what the noise coming from his car is. Henry and George try various things to make the noise stop, but it does not. Henry says the noise sounds like a cat. George lends some tools to Dennis so he can build Mrs. Cathcart's cat a house. He then opens the trunk and the cat escapes without him seeing it. Mr. Wilson removes and replaces various fenders and compartments on his car trying to sound proof them. Henry buys a tool chest for Dennis. George tests the car and the noise is gone, so he thinks he finally fixed the problem. Mr. Wilson then replaces a flower trellis on the side of his house and the cat sneaks into an air duct that was exposed. George and Martha hear the cat meowing behind the wall. When Dennis mentions that the cat may have kittens at any time, George uses some of Dennis' tools to break a large hole in the wall to rescue the cat. Outside, Dennis manages to get the cat from the air duct. Martha does not want George to know he broke the hole in the wall for nothing, so she puts the cat back in the air duct. George then thinks he rescued the cat. Roy Roberts as Humphrey McDougall.
55	23	"The Going Away Gift"	William D. Russell	Phil Leslie	March 12, 1961
Alice will be out of town for a while to take care of her injured father. Dennis gets his mother some earrings for a going-away present. Misunderstanding something Mr. Wilson says, Dennis hides his present on Mr. Wilson's closet shelf. Martha finds the present and thinks it is for her, as it is a special day. Not knowing what special day it is, George cannot bring himself to tell Martha the gift is not for her. George tells Dennis what happened and says they will get his mother other earrings. Back at Mr. Finch's store, Dennis cannot find earrings that he likes as much as the ones he bought before. Dennis says he will just have to get the earrings back from Mrs. Wilson. Mr. Finch then railroads George into buying an expensive bottle of perfume for Dennis. Dennis comes home with the present just as Henry's mother shows up to fill in for Alice. The Wilsons come by the say goodbye to Alice. Dennis explains to Henry about the mix up with the earrings and Martha overhears it. Martha confesses that when she saw the gift, she thought it was for a special occasion that she forgot about. Dennis almost causes another mix-up, but everything works out. Note: Within the show's canon, Alice Mitchell was leaving on an extended trip to help her father mend from surgery. In real life, Gloria Henry left for nine episodes to go on maternity leave although she filmed a few short segments to be shown while she was gone. Grandma Mitchell, Henry's mother, who was played by Kathleen Mulqueen, stayed with the Mitchells for the next several weeks.
56	24	"Dennis and the Fishing Rod"	William D. Russell	Mort R. Lewis	March 19, 1961
Dennis wants to buy a fishing rod for his father and he has Mr. Finch spend a lot of time wrapping it. But when he goes to pay, Dennis finds he does not have enough money. Meanwhile, Grandma Mitchell has a ragged ancestral Confederate jacket sent from home to show Henry. Dennis asks if he could wear it and show it to Mr. Wilson. Dennis finds a $50.00 Confederate bill in the jacket. Dennis then has Mr. Finch wrap the rod again. Mr. Finch gets upset when Dennis tries to pay with the Confederate money. Mr. Wilson has Jerry Richman (Stanley Adams), who is a coin collector, over to his house. Dennis comes over and when Mr. Wilson is out of the room, Jerry offers Dennis $5 for the Confederate bill. When Mr. Wilson finds out what happened, he shames Jerry into giving Dennis the bill back. Mr. Wilson then gives Dennis what the bill is really worth and he is able to buy the fishing rod.
57	25	"Dennis and the Good Example"	William D. Russell	Louella MacFarlane	March 26, 1961
Dennis sees a mynah bird he wants in a pet store. Mr. Bergstrom (Jon Lormer), the store owner, says he can have the bird free if he buys the bird cage. Dennis knows that once his dad sees his report card, he will not get it. Dennis talks to his father, and he promises to be good and study for school if his dad gets him a bird cage as a reward. The Wilsons are visiting Henry and Grandma Mitchell. Mrs. Wilson mentions that she is going to see Dr. Alfred Simpson (Alan Hewitt), who wants to put her on a diet. George says that if Martha stays on her diet, as a reward he will buy her a new dress. Mr. and Mrs. Wilson go to the doctor's office. After seeing Martha, Dr. Simpson decides George must go on the diet as well. Martha watches an exercise show on TV hosted by Mike Duval (Harry Landers). Later, Martha loses the weight and George buys her new clothes. Dennis gets better grades and also the bird, which he teaches to say "Hi, George".
58	26	"Dennis' Obligation"	William D. Russell	Arnold Peyser & Lois Peyser	April 2, 1961
Alice is still away taking care of her father. Dennis tells Henry that his teacher asks students to take home the school pets over the weekend while the heat is off at school. He wants Henry's permission to bring something home, which Henry reluctantly agrees to. Dennis brings home chicken eggs in an incubator. The bulb in the incubator burns out and Dennis and Tommy search for another. Grandma Mitchell finds the eggs on Dennis' bed and puts them in the refrigerator. The boys find the right bulb at Mr. Wilson's house. Meanwhile, George is playing long distance Chess and forgets it is his move. Dennis gets the eggs back into the incubator. That night, Miss Cathcart watches Dennis while Henry and Grandma Mitchell are out. A storm cuts the electricity to the Mitchell house. Dennis takes the eggs to Mr. Wilson's house, where they start to hatch. George almost gets into trouble with Sgt. Mooney about having farm animals in the house, but things work out. Elizabeth Harrower as Mrs. Johnson. Stuart Nisbet as Mr. Wade.
59	27	"The Dog Trainer"	William D. Russell	Budd Grossman	April 9, 1961
Mr. Wilson decides to teach his dog, Fremont, a few commands. But, things do not go as planned and George gets frustrated. Dennis asks if he can help train Fremont, and Mr. Wilson allows him to do all the training. With the help of jellybeans, Dennis is able to train the dog. But, Fremont now only responds to Dennis and not to Mr. Wilson. In a dream scene, Dennis and Fremont try to teach Mr. Wilson (dressed as a dog) tricks. Mr. Wilson, sadly, gives Fremont to Dennis because he believes Fremont does not like him anymore. Dennis comes up with a way for Fremont to want to go back to George.
60	28	"Woodman, Spare That Tree"	Charles Barton	Phil Leslie	April 16, 1961
Dennis and Tommy are feeding crows in the backyard. The birds are causing noise while Mr. Wilson is on the phone. He is trying to argue for keeping an old tree in the park from being chopped down. George receives a letter from cousin Sterling, who owed him money. In the letter is a hundred dollar bill. George drops the bill and one of the crows grabs it and flies off. Mr. Timberlake (Maurice Manson), from the bird watchers society, sends George a telegram. He will come by to lend support in saving the tree. Dennis and Tommy decide to try to follow the crows to where they live and get Mr. Wilson's money back. Commissioner Thornton plans to cut the tree down before the planned protest starts. Dennis and Tommy find the money in a crow's nest in the old tree. Mr. Wilson climbs the tree just as Thornton and the men who are going to cut it down show up. Thornton threatens to cut down the tree even with George in it. George retrieves his money. Many of the towns people show up and Thornton changes his mind about the tree. Mr. Timberlake will even put a plaque on the tree in George's honor.
61	29	"The Boy Wonder"	Charles Barton	Louella MacFarlane	April 23, 1961
Mr. Wilson would like a backyard barbecue built and he asks Mr. Erickson (Tyler McVey) for a quote. When George hears the price, he decides to build the barbecue himself. George finds a turtle in the yard and gives it to Dennis. Mr. Wilson then hires Dennis' teenage friend, Fred Baines, to help build the barbecue. To keep Dennis out of the way, George hires him to guard the driveway. Fred plays loud music on a record player, which annoys Mr. Wilson. He buys a portable radio with an earphone for Fred. Dennis' wandering pet turtle gets trapped in the barbecue. Dennis calls the fire department and when they arrive, the Wilsons believe their house is on fire. Dennis tells the firemen about the turtle and they tear down part of the barbecue to save it. When finally finished, Mr. Wilson hears the radio he gave Fred start to play music from inside the barbecue and he tears down part of it once again. Hal Hopper as Driver's Helper.
62	30	"The Soapbox Derby"	William D. Russell	Keith Fowler & Phil Leslie	April 30, 1961
Johnny Brady is building a car for a soap box derby, so Dennis decides to build one also. The prize for the winner is an electric train set. After annoying Mr. Quigley enough, Dennis gets a soap box from him. Charles Brady brags to Henry about Johnny and how he is going to win the race. Henry and Mr. Wilson decide to help Dennis build his car. Charles comes by and makes fun of the car. George gets carried away and Henry winds up making a $50 bet with Charles on whose car will win. It is the day of the race. Before Dennis is to race, Mr. Wilson gets in the car to make a last second change. Without a hammer, George wants a board to drive in a loose nail. Dennis removes the starter bar when he is asked for a piece of wood and Mr. Wilson has the fastest time. Unfortunately, Dennis' car is disqualified and Johnny wins the prize. But, Charles still had to pay off the bet because it was whose car was the fastest. Johnny comes over and shows Dennis the little train set he won. Dennis shows Johnny the large train set Henry bought for him with the $50.
63	31	"Dennis and the Camera"	William D. Russell	John Elliotte	May 7, 1961
Fellow-garden-club member Mr. Timberlake brings Mr. Wilson a special delicate plant that only blooms at night and they set it in the yard. George says that he will take a picture of the bloom. He is to get the photograph to the newspaper the next morning. Dennis comes by and asks Mr. Wilson if he was in the scouts. George brags about all the things he could do as an eagle scout. Dennis talks Henry into cooking a meal outside and starting the fire the way the pioneers did. Henry cannot get a fire started and Dennis says he will ask Mr. Wilson to help. While Dennis and Henry are getting something, George starts the fire with a match. Dennis and Henry are also going to sleep outdoors. George falls asleep right before the flower starts to bloom. Dennis tries to wake him up but cannot. Dennis wakes up Henry, but his father cannot get out of the sleeping bag. Dennis goes to get his own camera and takes a picture of the bloom. George tells Mr. Timberlake that he did not get the picture. Dennis tells George and Mr. Timberlake that he took the picture and brought it to the newspaper. Dennis asks Mr. Wilson to be the Scout Den Mother. George says he will if the picture is actually in the paper. The paper arrives and on the front is a picture of the flower blooming and George sleeping in the background.
64	32	"Dennis and the Miracle Plant Food"	William D. Russell	Budd Grossman	May 14, 1961
Mr. Wilson is mixing up a new plant food. Dennis is arguing with Margaret about what to name one of his frogs. Tommy wonders if they will ever like girls when they are older. Dennis and Tommy watch as George feeds one of his plants the new food. Dennis accidentally steps on that plant while chasing a frog. The boys get an identical, but much larger, plant from Tommy's yard. They replace it in the flower bed without Mr. Wilson knowing. When Mr. Wilson sees the plant, he is convinced that the new miracle plant food he invented is the cause of the growth. He calls Mrs. Schooner from the garden club and wants some members to come over and see it. Tommy tells Dennis that his mother wants her plant back. Tommy then puts George's original plant back in its place. The garden club come by and see the smaller plant and think George was lying to them. But, they will give him another chance and let George put more food on it. Dennis goes to Mr. Merrivale (Will Wright) and tries to buy another plant with Dennis's frogs. The boys do make a deal with Mr. Merrivale and get the plant. The garden club come back later, see the larger plant and congratulate George. Dennis comes by and tells the club what really happened. The club members just laugh the whole thing off. Jonathan Hole as Mr. Trumble. Note: This episode marks Kathleen Mulqueen's final appearance as Grandma Mitchell.
65	33	"Dennis' Newspaper"	William D. Russell	Keith Fowler & Phil Leslie	May 21, 1961
Dennis learns that Mr. Wilson would have liked to have had his name in the newspaper. Dennis and Tommy start their own newspaper, "The Mr. Wilson News", in which they write about Mr. Wilson's daily activities. They overhear George playfully telling Martha that he would give $20 for a raccoon coat like the one he had in college. The boys put that in their paper and then tell Mr. Krinkie (Charles Seel), who prints the information in the local newspaper. George and Martha are going away for the day. A man (Jess Kirkpatrick) comes by the Wilson house with a racoon coat and sees Dennis. Dennis gets into the house and lets the man in to leave his name and number. In no time, the Wilson household is overflowing with raccoon coats from sellers from all over town. When George comes home, he cannot believe what he is seeing. He tries calling all the people, but no one will come for their coats. Chuck Long (Jimmy Hawkins), a young man, comes by and would like to buy one of the coats. Soon, George is able to unload all the coats and the young men will pay the original owners. The local TV news does a story about all the high school boys with the coats and George gets to be on TV. Note: This was Gloria Henry's return to the show after missing nine episodes for maternity leave.
66	34	"Mr. Wilson's Paradise"	William D. Russell	Louella MacFarlane	May 28, 1961
Mr. Wilson helps Dennis research a school report about an island off the coast of Mexico called "The Isle of Happiness". After thinking about his drab life, George tells Martha he would like to go to that island. George finds out that there are no hotels on the island. They could rent a home, but it would have to be for a year. Martha's agrees to go. George rents his home to Dennis's teacher, Mr. Hubbard (Vaughn Taylor). George and Martha start to learn Spanish. George is a little annoyed when he sees the changes Mr. Hubbard plans to make to the house. The Wilsons learn that their niece, Georgianna, is going to have a baby. After a bad dream, George decides he does not want to go to the island because of the baby. Mr. Hubbard refuses to back out of the deal, until he hears Dennis read his report, and decides he will go to the Isle of Happiness instead.
67	35	"The Fortune Cookie"	William D. Russell	Budd Grossman	June 4, 1961
The Mitchells and Wilsons have tea together to celebrate George's good fortune in selling his coin collection. The buyer, Philip Sheldon, is to arrive the next day. They each open a fortune cookie, and George's seems to indicate a bad day for him tomorrow. Dennis tells Mr. Wilson that he will not let anything bad happen to him. The next day, George is starting to worry about what the fortune said and some things do go wrong for him. Dennis and his friends are determined to protect him from harm. George receives a package and is afraid to open it. Martha gets him to open it and it is just her new hat. George is watching a contest show on TV. Dennis and friends come by with some fudge that George starts to eat. The contest show calls George, but he cannot answer the question because of the fudge. When he can finally talk, his time is up. Despite annoying George, the boys do manage to help him from being ripped off by the buyer of the coins.
68	36	"The Pioneers"	William D. Russell	Story by : Arnold Peyser & Lois Peyser; Teleplay by : Arnold Peyser & Lois Peyser & Phil Leslie	June 11, 1961
Mr. Krinkie writes an article in his newspaper about how the man of today could not match their pioneer ancestors. George writes a response to the article and tells Krinkie off. Krinkie in turn, challenges George to prove he could live off the land. Mr. Wilson, Henry and Dennis set out to show they can survive three days in the wilderness. They will be armed only with a knife, an ax, and a fishing rod - plus a tempting large basket of food, which is only supposed to be for Dennis. The men have no luck catching any fish on the first day. The next morning it is back to fishing. Mr. Krinkie sends out Mr. Kowalski (Judson Pratt), the photographer, to get some pictures of the pioneers in action. Mr. Wilson thinks he has a bite on his line, but it turns out to be a large metal milk can. George and Henry are eating berries, while Dennis and Kowalski eat real food. It is the next day and the men still cannot find any food. They just about give up, when Dennis finds out that a large milk can that Mr. Wilson had caught earlier was actually full of fish.
69	37	"Father's Day for Mr. Wilson"	William D. Russell	Keith Fowler & Phil Leslie	June 18, 1961
Henry tells the Wilsons what a wonderful Father's Day he had. George tells them that he is being sued by old man Hatch. Hatch claims George's dog, Freemont, bit him while he was in the park. Dennis says he saw the dog do it, but that Hatch kicked Freemont first. The next morning, Dennis decides Mr. Wilson needs his own Father's Day. Dennis tries to do everything to have George enjoy his day. George calls a judge friend of his and the judge says Hatch may have a good case. John McRae (Willis Bouchey), Hatch's lawyer, comes to see George. McRae says that Hatch will settle the case for $200. George starts to write a check when Dennis and Tommy show up. McRae says that Hatch was bitten on his right leg and Dennis says that the right leg is a wooden leg. McRae apologizes and leaves.
70	38	"Dennis and the Picnic"	William D. Russell	Louella MacFarlane	June 25, 1961
Alice, Dennis and the Wilsons were going to go on a picnic without Henry, because he had to work on a project. Before they go, Henry finds a large envelope in the gutter outside his house and is surprised to find it is full of money. Dennis thinks that bank robbers threw the money away because they thought police were too close. Dennis tells Johnny Brady about the money, but Johnny does not believe Dennis's story. Dennis then calls Mr. Krinkie of the Chronicle to get the story in the paper. Henry asks George to go with him to the police to turn the money in to Sgt. Mooney. Dennis is thrilled when Henry's picture gets in the paper, making Henry a bit of a local hero. Lt. Rockwell (Robert Bice) comes to the house to speak with Henry. He tells Henry that the money was counterfeit and the police know who the counterfeiters are. Henry is trying to get his work done, but all the neighbors in the house are bothering him. In the end, Henry's hard work pays off and Dennis learns a lesson about bragging. Hal Smith as Frank Wade. Elizabeth Harrower as Mrs. Thompson.

=== Season 3 (1961–62) ===
This is the final season to keep the 1959-1962 title screen intact. The Screen Gems logo after the closing credits has been updated for all episodes, using the 1960 Screen Gems logo instead of the 1955 Screen Gems logo.

No. overall	No. in season	Title	Directed by	Written by	Original release date
71	1	"Trouble from Mars"	Charles Barton	Budd Grossman	October 1, 1961
There is an article in the local paper about a man that claimed to see a space ship landing and little men getting out of it. George learns that he won an essay contest from "Graceful Retirement" magazine. Mr. Wilson goes for a haircut in preparation for the magazine taking his picture for the article. Unfortunately, Dennis and his friends, dressed in space suits, scare Selby the barber (Forrest Lewis) and the back of George's hair is accidentally shaved off. Dennis and his friends tell Henry and Alice what happened. Henry brings the boys over to George's house to apologize. Dennis leaves his space helmet at George's house. For fun, George tries the helmet on and then cannot get it off. George goes to Henry for help with no luck. George goes home and gets stuck in the bathroom. Dennis calls the fire department. The fire truck arrives just as the photographers from the magazine show up. They take pictures as the firemen drag George out of the bathroom window. He has the helmet on and his pants off. In the end, George gets the helmet off and things work out with the magazine. Billy Booth as Tommy Anderson. Norman Leavitt as Officer Ted Quincy. Lyle Latell as Fire Chief.
72	2	"Best Neighbor"	Charles Barton	Russell Beggs	October 8, 1961
In order to join the Junior Pathfinders club at school, Dennis has to camp out on Lookout Ridge. He has to do it that night and asks Henry to go with him. Henry is too busy with work and cannot go. Meanwhile, Mrs. Schooner informs Mr. Wilson that he has been nominated for the Best Citizen of the Year award. To improve his own odds of winning, Mr. Wilson takes Dennis camping on the cold and windy mountainside. George gets their two canteens and assorted other things stuck up a tree while trying to knock down a special pine cone. George eventually climbs the tree and gets the pine cone. Due to his work on the Neighborhood Improvement Committee, Henry is also nominated for the award. During the night, George is awakened by two women campers and he is rude to them. The next day, Dennis becomes a Pathfinder. When Henry hears that George was also nominated, he hopes George wins. George does wind up winning. Kate Murtagh as Crystalbell.
73	3	"Keep Off the Grass"	Charles Barton	Phil Leslie & Keith Fowler	October 15, 1961
A new regulation says no one can walk on the grass in the park. A policeman chases Dennis and his friends off the grass and then puts up a "Keep Off The Grass" sign. Dennis tells his parents what happened. Alice demands that Henry go and talk to the policeman. Henry gets a ticket for walking on the grass in order to talk to the policeman. Mr. Wilson talks Henry into going back to the policeman and fighting the ticket. Thanks to George, Henry winds up getting two more tickets. George then talks Henry into going to court and George will represent him. George goes to the library to try and find a precedent for the case. But thanks to Dennis, he gets kicked out. In court, George says that Dennis is a witness. Judge Andrew Strickland (Edgar Stehli) has Dennis take the stand. Dennis causes a commotion when he has a frog in his pocket. But, with Dennis' help, Henry wins.
74	4	"Mr. Wilson's Safe"	Charles Barton	Budd Grossman	October 22, 1961
Mr. Wilson has a new wall safe. He has the deed to property that he and the Mitchells own that they want to sell to Mr. Merrivale (Will Wright) and puts it in the safe. George decides to memorize the combination and destroy the paper that it was on. George agrees to let Dennis store his baseball cards in the safe. Dennis uses numbers for a football play that are the combination to Mr. Wilson's safe. That night Merrivale calls to say he will be by the next day to get the deed. George tells Dennis how safe his cards will be and lets him try to open the safe. Using his football play numbers, Dennis opens the safe. The next day, Dennis is playing football with friends and keeps using the safe combination for his plays. Mr. Wilson and Henry get Dennis so confused with other play numbers that he forgets the combination. Unfortunately, Mr. Wilson forgets it, as well. Mr. Wilson tries to hypnotize Dennis to get the combination, but winds up hypnotizing himself. While under, he reveals the combination just as Mr. Merrivale shows up.
75	5	"Haunted House"	Charles Barton	Budd Grossman	October 29, 1961
George and Henry purchase a house as an income property from real estate agent Mr. Bowers (Harvey Korman). After the men leave, Bowers calls his mother, Mrs. Bowers (Kitty Kelly), and tells her he sold the broken down old house of hers. Sgt. Mooney (George Cisar) tells George and Henry that a fast talking real estate agent sold a haunted house to a couple of unsuspecting guys. George, Henry and Mooney speak with Bowers and his mother about getting their money back. The sale was done legally and there is nothing George and Henry can do. They go to the house and the tramp (Harold Gould) that has been living there hides in the basement. Dennis and Tommy come by and say they will look for the ghost. Pretending to be a ghost, the tramp talks to the boys through the duct-work. Dennis tells Henry about the ghost. Henry and George decide to sleep inside to prove that it is not haunted. That night it starts to storm. George and Henry hear something outside. Sgt. Mooney comes in the house and the men throw a sheet over him. The noise wakes the tramp in the basement and he makes eerie noises through the duct-work. Dennis and two friends arrive at the house covered in sheets and look through the basement window. This frightens the tramp and he runs upstairs and is discovered by George, Henry and Mooney. The tramp says he will be leaving for Florida. Note: The same house later is referenced in "The Bully," after George sells John half of his share in the house.
76	6	"The School Play"	Charles Barton	Budd Grossman	November 5, 1961
Mr. Wilson makes up an excuse to not watch Dennis in a school play that evening because he wants to watch the fights on TV. Dennis and Tommy ask George to help them rehearse. While rehearsing, Dennis handcuffs Mr. Wilson to Tommy and then realizes there is no key. Henry tries to saw them apart, but it does not work. Sgt. Mooney comes by as he was the one that gave Dennis the handcuffs, thinking they did not work. Mooney says he will try and find Buzz the locksmith (Chubby Johnson). Everyone else heads off to the play. The play is about to start and Buzz arrives. Buzz makes a wax impression of the key, but has to go home to finish it. Buzz returns, but the key still needs some work. George is forced to join the play. Part way through, Buzz is able to unlock them and Mr. Wilson runs out of the room. The next day, Henry and Alice read George a raving review of his performance in the play. Dennis tells George that the school wants to do the play again that evening with him in it.
77	7	"The Fifty-Thousandth Customer"	James R. Goldstone	Keith Fowler & Phil Leslie	November 12, 1961
Mr. Finch (Charles Lane) is offering a free 5-minute shopping spree for the 50,000th customer at his pharmacy. Mr. Wilson hopes to calculate the exact moment that it will happen so he can walk through the door and claim the prize. George asks Henry and Alice to bring over a few items he has written down. George has set up his back yard to resemble Finch's store. George has Henry time him as he does a practice run for his shopping spree. At Finch's store, Mr. Wilson is giving him a hard time about how he is going to win. George notices that Finch has moved things around and put many things on upper shelves. While in line, George thinks he has things timed out to the minute. He lets a few people go ahead of him in line. Then he lets Dennis go ahead and Dennis winds up being the winner. The rule is that one gets to keeps as much as he can carry. Dennis out smarts Finch and puts what he wants in a hammock to carry out. Being small and agile, it was easy for Dennis to get things on the top shelves. Dennis grabs some special items for the Wilsons and his parents. Irene Tedrow as Mrs. Lucy Elkins.
78	8	"Dennis and the Pee Wee League"	Charles Barton	Ann Marcus	November 19, 1961
Dennis sees a picture of George when he played semi-pro baseball. After Dennis' suggestion, a group of fathers make Mr. Wilson the President of the Pee-Wee League. It turns out to be more work than he thought it would be. George is about to quit and then Dennis shows him an article in the paper about him being President. The day before Dennis' team is to play Tommy Brady's team, coach Henry becomes ill. Henry asks George to coach the team, but George is not interested. But when Charlie Brady (Laurence Haddon) makes fun of the idea of George being the coach, George changes his mind. It is the day of the game and Dennis' team is losing. George brings Dennis' team back from a 6 - 0 deficit to win. Because of his victory, George gets drafted into being President of the Pee-Wee Football League.
79	9	"Mr. Wilson's Inheritance"	Charles Barton	Arnold Peyser & Lois Peyser	November 26, 1961
Mr. Bierschmidt (Gordon Jones), a contractor, tells George he has cracks in his foundation. George puts off the repair for now. Mr. Wilson believes he is a millionaire when he inherits his aunt's estate and thinks about maybe starting a charitable foundation. George calls Stanley Guth, from the museum, to appraise a truck load of artwork that is to arrive the next day. Through a misunderstanding with Dennis, Mr. Bierschmidt thinks Mr. Wilson has ordered a whole new foundation dug under his house. He begins the project while the Wilsons are away. Mr. Wilson buys a fancy sports car. He sees Bierschmidt digging up around his house and tells him to stop. George explains to Dennis that he meant a foundation to help with needy causes. Because of Dennis, Mrs. Elkins, and then later a lot of children, come by with worthy causes. George receives a telegram saying there is no money. The truck arrives with what George hopes is the art collection. Stanley Guth says the paintings are basically worthless. In the trenches Bierschmidt dug up, Dennis finds saber tooth tiger teeth fossils. Stanley Guth says they would be worth a lot and George donates them to the museum. Lennie Weinrib as Trucker.
80	10	"Dennis Is a Genius"	Charles Barton	Budd Grossman	December 3, 1961
Dennis' school teacher Miss Perkins (Elizabeth Harrower) stops by to tell the Mitchells that Dennis scored high on an IQ test at school and that he is a genius. Dennis thinks he is in trouble, but Henry lets it slip that he is a genius. Dennis tells his friends how smart he is. Mr. Wilson is stunned when he hears the news. A Dr. Heydon (James Millhollin) comes by to test Dennis and believes him to be of high intelligence as well. Dr. Heydon implies to Henry and Alice that Dennis should perhaps be in a more stimulating environment. In a dream sequence, Mr. Wilson is a classmate of Dennis' friends and Dennis is the teacher. All the other students are much smarter than Mr. Wilson. He is given a dunce cap and made to sit in the corner. The next day, it is clear that Dennis has been in a fight. A new kid said that geniuses are sissies. Henry and Alice argue over whether to send Dennis to a private school. The Mitchells fear nothing will be the same for Dennis. They are relieved and thrilled later when they find out there was a mistake in the grading.
81	11	"The Lucky Piece"	Charles Barton	Phil Leslie & Keith Fowler	December 17, 1961
Dennis accidentally breaks Mrs. Elkins window with his football. Henry does expect Dennis to pay for the repair. Mrs. Wilson agrees to pay Dennis 50 cents to mow the lawn. Mr. Wilson tricks Dennis into taking a silver coin that reads "good luck" and has a horseshoe on it instead of the money. Martha does not like that George cheated Dennis. She arranges for Dennis to find a one dollar bill, that she took from George's wallet, on the sidewalk. Martha tells Alice that she is going to teach George a lesson. The two plan more lucky things to happen to Dennis. When George hears about Dennis' good luck, he starts to wonder about the coin. Alice tells Henry what her and Martha have been up to and he offers to help. George tries to buy the coin back from Dennis. Henry bids up the price until George pays $5 for the coin. Martha tells George about their scheme and he takes it in stride. George throws the coin into the street. A hobo picks it up, and before George's eyes, the hobo has two lucky things happen to him. George runs after him wanting to buy the coin back.
82	12	"The Fifteen-Foot Christmas Tree"	Charles Barton	Phil Leslie & Keith Fowler	December 24, 1961
Mr. Wilson criticizes the very small, artificial Christmas tree the Mitchells bought from Mr. Quigley (Willard Waterman). He insists they visit land owned by a friend of his and cut down a real tree. They get to the land and Dennis finds a nice looking but very large tree. George goes to cut it down, but his axe breaks on the first swing. Dennis has his Scout axe with him. It takes some doing, but they get the tree cut down. While lifting the tree, George's coat, with his car keys in it, gets knocked into a well. A man named Wilbur (Marshall Kent) comes by and claims this was his land. He is lying and makes George pay for the tree. Wilson, Henry, and Dennis carry the tree on a bus, breaking a window and annoying the incredulous driver and passengers. Once home, Mr. Wilson proceeds to prune the tree and really makes a mess of it. Figuring that George would goof up somehow, Mr. Quigley brings by the little tree that Henry returned earlier. Everyone sings "Silent Night". Louise Lorimer as Dowager. Fiona Hale as Gladys Pickett. Note: Jingle Bells was played over the closing credits, instead of the show's regular theme music.
83	13	"Dennis' Bank Account"	Charles Barton	Phil Leslie & Keith Fowler	December 31, 1961
Mr. Wilson takes a temporary position at the bank to help with their new customer drive. Dudley Yates (Paul Maxey), the Bank President, shows George around the bank and thanks him for his help. Dennis and Henry come by the bank to open an account for Dennis. Dennis causes a little bit of a problem when he drops his 300 pennies. The next day Dennis comes by the bank to check on his money. He annoys George while he is trying to set up an account for Mr. Bishop. Mr. Bishop leaves without opening the account. Mr. Clute (John Fiedler), the bank teller, tells George and Dennis that he has been jittery ever since an attempted robbery weeks earlier. Dennis insists on physically seeing his money, then he says he will stay and watch it until it grows. George sends him on his way. The next day, Dennis brings some more pennies. Mr. Clute mistakes a move customer Mr. Bickerstaff makes and sets off the alarm. After the police arrive, there is some more confusion but things get straightened out. To get rid of Dennis, George tears up his bank book and gives him $5. Dennis brings a bunch of his friends to Mr. Wilson. They want the same deal Dennis got.
84	14	"Through Thick and Thin"	Charles Barton	Russell Beggs	January 7, 1962
The Mitchells are hosting a circus act for a cub scout event. Dennis is to be a lion tamer and he needs to find a second boy to be the back half in a lion's costume. Meanwhile, George is concerned that Mr. Krinkie (Charles Seel) is writing an article about him. George is worried that Krinkie hopes to find something embarrassing about him. Dennis comes by the Wilson house and sees a picture of when George was a Flag Pole Sitter. George does not want Dennis to tell anyone about the picture for fear that Krinkie hears about it. Dennis convinces Mr. Wilson to be the lion. He tells Mr. Wilson that nobody has to know he is the one inside the costume. It is the night of the scout event. Krinkie sends Mr. Millard, a photographer, to take pictures. Several acts perform and then it is Dennis' turn. When Mr. Wilson takes a bow, his lion head falls off and Mr. Millard gets a picture of him. The next day, Krinkie comes by and teases George about the picture. Dennis lets it slip that George was a champion flag pole sitter. Dennis also says how Krinkie was the front end in the giraffe costume. George and Krinkie agree to keep each other's secret.
85	15	"Calling All Bird Lovers"	Charles Barton	Russell Beggs	January 14, 1962
Hoping to be selected as a delegate to a bird lovers' convention, Mr. Wilson is going to host a reception for the organization at his home that afternoon. The program will include Mrs. Hutton (Estelle Winwood) who does actual bird calls. George hopes to impress Mr. Pindyck (Parley Baer), the head of the state's Bird Lovers Society. Mrs. Hutton comes by to check out the room she will perform in. She does not think the room will be work for her. But after some flattery from Martha, Mrs. Hutton agrees to perform. Something Dennis inadvertently says offends Mrs. Hutton and she leaves. Henry says he will try and talk her into coming back. Winthrop (Sherwood Price) and Nelson (Joe Conley), two beatniks, see a sign for the meeting in a music shop window, ("Remember the Bird"). They think the occasion is to honor a music legend. Winthrop and Nelson show up to the reception and wind up irritating Mr. Pindyck. Then Dennis and Tommy bring in a stuffed owl which further angers Pindyck. He is about to leave when Henry shows up with Mrs. Hutton. Pindyck stays and Mrs. Hutton starts her bird calls. Two more musicians show up and Winthrop and Nelson turn it into a jazz program. Pindyck storms out and sees Dennis holding a rare bird. After taking a picture of the bird, a grateful Pindyck makes George a delegate, but George has to take Dennis with him.
86	16	"Silence Is Golden"	Charles Barton	Phil Leslie & Keith Fowler	January 21, 1962
Mrs. Elkins is buying the house next to the Wilsons. George would like to buy a thin strip of land at the side of the house so he can widen his driveway. Henry is trying to get some work done and sends Dennis away because he is talking too much. George is looking at his stamp collection. Dennis comes by and bothers George with his non-stop talking. George bets Dennis that if he does not talk to him for the rest of the day, George will give Dennis his magnifying glass. Later, Dennis, without saying anything, tries to let George know that Freemont the dog is digging up George's flowers. Mrs. Elkins comes by and tells George that she will not sell the strip of land to him. She is buying the house to rent it out. Meanwhile, Alice and Henry are worried about Dennis not talking to them. Dennis explains to his parents about the bet with Mr. Wilson. Tommy tells Dennis that he saw Johnny Brady tie a tin can to the tail of Mrs. Elkins' cat. Mrs. Elkins accuses Mr. Wilson of doing it to the cat. George begs Dennis to tell her they were together all day. At first Dennis refuses, because he does not want to lose the bet. Mr. Wilson gives Dennis the magnifying glass, and Dennis tells Mrs. Elkins it was Johnny Brady that did that to her cat. Dennis says that Mr. Wilson loves cats, which in fact he does not. Mrs. Elkins apologizes to George and agrees to sell him the strip of land. Later, Mrs. Elkins gives George a baby kitten.
87	17	"Dennis Has a Fling"	Charles Barton	John Elliotte & Herbert Finn	January 28, 1962
Dennis' school is putting on a show about all nations. Each student has to ask someone to represent a different nationality to be in the play. Dennis would like to represent Scotland but his mother is a mixture of English, Welsh and Danish. Henry is part Irish and French, so his parents decline to participate. So Dennis asks Mr. Wilson, who has Scottish ancestors, but he is not interested, either. Dennis then asks Mr. Angus MacTavish (Tudor Owen), who accepts. Once Mr. Wilson finds out there are prizes involved, he wants to be in it. Dennis asks Mr. Krinkie to decide between Angus and George after they each put on a performance. George tells Krinkie that he is expecting a letter proving his Scottish ancestry. Dennis and Tommy hear George with bagpipe player Mr. Campbell. When George and Mr. Campbell step away for a moment, Dennis loses his bubble gum in one of the bagpipe pipes. George comes back and tries to play the bagpipes. The bubble gum expands and pops on George's face. It is time to perform in front of Krinkie. George sings a song then dances with some women in Scottish attire. Krinkie picks George. A letter arrives stating that Mr. Wilson is actually Irish. Angus now gets to represent Scotland. Dennis suggests Mr. Wilson can represent Ireland instead, but mailman O'Reilly (Emory Parnell) is already doing so! Special Guest Star: Susan Jones, 1961 Miss Scotland.
88	18	"Frog Jumping Contest"	Charles Barton	Budd Grossman	February 4, 1962
Dennis wants to enter his frog Sam in a frog-jumping contest with Mr. Wilson as his partner. Sgt. Mooney comes by George's house to sell him some tickets to the Policeman's Ball. Mr. Wilson bets Sgt. Mooney that Dennis' frog will beat Marilyn, Mooney's frog. Henry warns Dennis that if Sam gets in the house once more, she will not be able to be in the contest. Sam does get into the house and Dennis cannot find her. The Wilsons go to visit the Mitchells and George tries to help find the frog. Despite Henry being around, George manages to catch Sam. Turns out Henry knew what George was doing and laughs it off. While practicing, Sam does not jump as far as usual. Dennis and George take Sam to Dr. Johnson (Alan Hewitt), an actual doctor, because the vet is out of town. Dr. Johnson reluctantly agrees to examine Sam. He gives Sam a vitamin shot and says Sam might need a friend. Dennis finds some boy frogs, but Sam does not seem interested. It is the day of the contest. Sam appears to like Mooney's frog and makes a jump long enough to win. Apparently, Marilyn is actually a boy frog.
89	19	"Where There is a Will"	Charles Barton	Budd Grossman	February 11, 1962
It is Mr. Wilson's birthday and he decides to leave Dennis a gold watch in his will. Dennis brings some friends to George's house to see the watch. Dennis says it will be a long time before he gets the watch because Mr. Wilson has plenty of years left. But Tommy and Chuck keep making comments about George's age. George's back starts to bother him. Dennis brings over various medicines and a book on how to keep one's health. Soon after, Mr. Wilson begins to feel old and is convinced that he has a short time to live. Dennis goes to Mr. Phillips (Ray Teal), an attorney, to have a will drawn up so he can leave his favorite things to Mr. Wilson. Meanwhile, George calls for the Doctor (Hardie Albright). The Doctor tells Martha there is nothing wrong with George. Dennis asks Henry what he can do to make Mr. Wilson feel young. That evening, Martha has a surprise birthday party for George. George still feels old, but Mrs. Weatherby insists on dancing with him. It is the end of the party and everyone has left except the Mitchells. George feels great and has one last dance. Despite it being very late, Dennis comes by. Dennis gives Mr. Wilson a copy of his will as a birthday gift. He is so touched that he gives Dennis the watch. Note: This episode aired six days before the actor playing Mr. Wilson, Joseph Kearns, actually died. He does appear in the next several episodes because they were made prior to his death.
90	20	"Mr. Wilson's Uncle"	Charles Barton	Budd Grossman	February 18, 1962
George is expecting a visit from his Uncle Ned (Edward Everett Horton), a rocking-chair addict. George tells Henry that the last time Ned visited, he was extremely feeble. When Ned arrives, he is active, fit, and energetic. The next day, Ned gets Henry and George up very early to start his exercise program. Later in the day, George comes by to pick up Henry for more exercises, but Henry refuses to go. Alice makes Henry go. This time Ned has gym equipment set up in George's yard. Ned shows the men a routine he expects them to do on the parallel bars. Dennis sells tickets to a bunch of neighborhood boys to watch Henry and George work out. As the two struggle to keep up, they plot a way to end the exercises. They buy a set of fake barbells. Ned is quite impressed with George and Henry's weightlifting skills and agrees to end his program. But then Dennis comes by and lifts the barbells. Ned is not upset that he had been fooled, but now the exercising will continue. Note: This episode aired the day after the actor playing Mr. Wilson, Joseph Kearns, died at age 55 following a stroke.
91	21	"A Quiet Evening"	Charles Barton	Budd Grossman	February 25, 1962
Mr. Wilson plans to have a quiet evening at home with his coin collection. The Mitchell's are going out for the evening and have a sitter for Dennis. Dennis surprises his parents when he brings over Seymour to stay the night because his parents could not find a sitter. Margaret comes by and tells Alice that her sister, who was to be the sitter, cannot make it. Alice calls Martha but she also has plans for the evening. Despite his objections, Martha volunteers George to be the sitter. Alice tells Dennis that Margaret will be staying with him and Seymour. George shows Dennis and Margaret a rare dime that he has. Seymour wants some candy. Seymour finds Mr. Wilson's rare dime, goes down the street and buys a candy bar from a vending machine. George, Dennis and Margaret find Seymour by the machine. When George learns that Seymour took his dime, he shakes the machine until all the coins come out. The children see a policeman (John Astin) coming and run off. The policeman arrests George. The children go to Mr. Martin's (Kirk Alyn) house where the Mitchell's are for the dinner party. Henry and Dennis go to the police station and explains things to the Sergeant (Charles Fredericks). George is allowed to go, but then he finds out the Sergeant used his dime for the stations candy machine. George winds up buying the candy machine. Blooper: Alice refers to Margaret's mother as "Mrs. Moore," even though Margaret's last name was established as Wade during the first season. Margaret also says her last name is "Harrington" in the fourth season.
92	22	"The Private Eye"	Charles Barton	Phil Leslie & Keith Fowler	March 4, 1962
Dennis gets a new Private Eye Detective Kit. Meanwhile, George is upset with neighbor Fred Adams because he does not return anything that George lends him. George really needed his pruning shears. George writes Fred a nasty letter. Dennis and Tommy play detective and find George's shears, with a note from Fred, in George's garage. George now needs to get back the letter he mailed. George gets his arms stuck in a public mailbox trying to retrieve the letter. While George waits for Dennis to get his father, his wallet is taken by a passing pickpocket (William Benedict). Dennis and Tommy want to help solve the crime, so they go to the police and speak with Sgt. Bagby (Emile Meyer). When Bagby asks for a description of the crook, Dennis misunderstands and describes Mr. Wilson. Officer Watts (Bob Hastings) finds Mr. Wilson and brings him to the station. Things get straightened out and George is set free. Dennis and Tommy use their new found skills to find the crook in an ice cream parlor. The boys tell Officer Watts where the crook is. George goes to Fred's apartment in hopes of intercepting the mailman before he delivers the letter. Dennis, Tommy, Officer Watts and the crook show up and George is able to identify the crook. But Officer Watts wants to know what George was doing to the mailbox. George explains about the letter and Watts leaves. Fred reads the letter and gets a laugh out of it.
93	23	"Mr. Wilson's Housekeeper"	Charles Barton	Phil Leslie & Keith Fowler	March 11, 1962
To help Martha, Mr. Wilson decides to hire a housekeeper. Meanwhile, Dennis is taking care of several mice as a school project and he shows them to George. Mrs. Flora Davis (Jean Stapleton) arrives at the Wilson house. She tells George she does not like messy people and she will be in complete control of the household. George tells Henry how happy Martha is and Martha complains to Alice that Flora will not let her do anything in the house. George starts to get annoyed with some of the things that Flora is doing, which disrupt his routines. Plus, she constantly criticizes everything George does. Martha and George each thinks the other is happy with the situation and are afraid to say anything. Mr. Wilson plots different ways to get her to quit. Then he finds out from Mr. Grigsby the milkman that Flora is afraid of mice. George has Dennis bring over his box of mice. But when Flora opens the box, there are baby chicks in there instead. Dennis has a second box and that one has the mice. Flora says she quits and runs out of the house. George and Martha confess to each other that they are happy she has gone.
94	24	"A Dog's Life"	Charles Barton	John Elliotte & Herbert Finn	March 18, 1962
Mr. Quigley (Willard Waterman) tries to keep a big shaggy dog he named Boswell out of his store. George comes by the store. Mr. Quigley ties some bologna to the back of Mr. Wilson's car. George runs into Dennis and offers to drive him home. When George leaves the store, the dog follows him home. Dennis tells George that the dog is following them. George tries to lose the dog by driving faster. They get home and the dog grabs the sausage and hides. A Motorcycle Officer (Bob Hastings) arrives to give George a ticket. George and Dennis try to explain about the dog, but the Officer does not believe them. When George opens the door to the house, Boswell runs in. George puts an add in Mr. Krinkie's paper about a lost dog. Mr. Krinkie thanks George for not just taking the dog to the pound. George talks the Mitchell's into taking Boswell, but Henry is allergic to it. When George tries to return the dog to Mr. Quigley, Mrs. Elkins brings in a Patrolman (Ivan Bonar) because dogs are not allowed in the store. Mr. Wilson gets another ticket. When George tries to take Boswell to the pound, Krinkie shames George into taking some more dogs.
95	25	"Dennis' Documentary Film"	Charles Barton	Phil Leslie & Keith Fowler	March 25, 1962
Dennis has a history project for school to take pictures of historical places around town, and then write a composition about them. Mrs. Wilson suggests Mr. Wilson help Dennis because he has a movie camera. Henry, Alice and Martha agree to help. While filming a squirrel, George falls backwards into a park fountain. The group then film many historical buildings and prominent people including the Mayor and Sgt. Mooney. George is setting up a scene and sets his camera down on the back of a truck, which then drives off. He gets the camera back when it stops at a stop sign. Teacher Miss Perkins asks George and Dennis to show the film at the next PTA meeting. Dennis has cards to read to go along with the movie, but drops them and they are now out of order. Between bad filming by George, editing mistakes and Dennis' reading the wrong cards, many people there are either laughing or insulted. Hal Hopper as Mr. Clark.
96	26	"Horseless Carriage Club"	Charles Barton	Phil Leslie & Keith Fowler	April 1, 1962
George buys a 1912 Winton to enter into the Horseless Carriage Road Race with the intent of winning the race. George hopes to become president of his and Henry's chapter of the Horseless Carriage Club. Senator Charles Washburn (Robert Burton) will be the judge of the race. Dennis asks Henry if there is anything he could do to earn some money, but Henry does not. George tells Dennis to never break a promise. Dennis talks Mr. Wilson into taking him & his friends on a drive in the car the day before the race. They would go to the lake and have a weenie roast. To make the money he needs, Dennis would charge his friends. Charles Brady comes by and makes fun of George's car. Charles informs George and Henry that a change of plans has occurred and the race is moved up one day. Mr. Wilson has to cancel the trip with the children. Tommy, Margaret and Seymour try to get George to change his mind, but it does not work. That night George has a dream that he is in court charged with breaking a promise. Dennis is the Judge and Margaret is the prosecutor. Tommy quits as George's defense lawyer and Seymour is the executioner. Feeling guilty, Mr. Wilson takes the children on the trip and misses the race. Charles Brady brags to George and Henry how he won the race and will probably be made president. When Senator Washburn hears about Mr. Wilson's gesture, he makes him the president of the Horseless Carriage Club.
97	27	"Junior Pathfinders Ride Again"	Charles Barton	Russell Beggs	April 8, 1962
Mr. Wilson hopes to get into the Pioneer Club. One of the perks of being a member is the free use of a mountain cabin for the whole summer. Dennis comes by and tells George that the leader of his Junior Pathfinders club cannot be in their Indian demonstration today. Dennis asks George to take his place, but George says he cannot. Mr. Judd (Lloyd Corrigan) and Mrs. Schooner from the Pioneer Club come by to see George. At first George does not make a good impression with Mr. Judd. Mr. Judd, who is very into Native Indians, see the arrowheads that Dennis left. Thinking they are George's, he volunteers George to be the replacement Indian chief for the Junior Pathfinders. George has to start a fire by rubbing together two sticks in a department store window. Fearing he might not be able to start the fire, Mr. Wilson has his cousin Fillmore, a chemist, put something on the sticks to insure a fire. When Mr. Judd arrives before George can get what he needs from Fillmore, George sends Henry to get the stuff. The demonstration is about to start and Henry just makes it. George rubs the sticks, but instead of a small fire, the whole place fills with smoke. Fire Chief Dooley (Roy Engel) calls in the fire department. George believes he has ruined his chance to be in the Pioneer Club. Later, Mr. Judd tells George that the arrowheads turned out to be very special. Because George donated them to the club, George will become a member of the Pioneer Club. Note: Mr. Wilson says early in the episode, "I'm his only great-nephew," referring to ancestor Jeremiah Wilson. This can be taken as a possibly false boast given not only the appearance in this episode of his cousin Fillmore, who shares the Wilson surname, but also in that just six episodes later, Mr. Wilson's brother, John, appears in the series for the first time.
98	28	"The Treasure Chest"	Charles Barton	John Elliotte & Herbert Finn	April 15, 1962
Mr. Wilson buys a treasure chest at an auction thinking that it might have a pirate's treasure in it. George tries to get the chest unlocked with no luck. After he leaves, Dennis and Tommy get the chest open with a piece of wire. They look at some of the stuff inside and then close it up again. Later, George calls Johnny the Locksmith (Johnny Lee), who gets the chest unlocked. When George discovers nothing valuable inside, he tells Dennis that he can do whatever he wants with it. Dennis & Tommy play pirates with the items in the chest, and even draw up a map to a pretend treasure. Tommy cuts his finger and gets blood on the map. The boys hope to charge their friends to look at the contents of the chest. George has Buzz the Salvage Man (Chubby Johnson) come by to haul the chest away. George finds the map and believes it is real. He changes his mind about Buzz taking the chest. He gets several friends to invest in a trip to hunt for the treasure. George tells them that if anything goes wrong, he will pay them back double what they put in. While George is showing the men the map, Dennis comes by and says that he drew the map. When the men have gone, Dennis pulls a coat out of the chest. It rips open and a load of money falls out. George pays everyone off. Sgt. Mooney comes by and tells George the money was stolen long ago and the FBI would like to talk to him. Maurice Manson as Mr. Frederick Timberlake.
99	29	"Wilson Goes to the Dentist"	Charles Barton	Budd Grossman	April 29, 1962
Dennis has a loose tooth and Alice thinks he should go to the dentist. But their regular dentist, Dr. Walters, is out of town. Henry thinks it should just fall out on its own. Dennis goes to Mr. Wilson to show off his loose tooth. It seems George should see a dentist also. Tommy tells the boys that there is a new dentist, Dr. Carl Cadwell (Arthur Malet), who gives presents to first-time patients. Dennis finds out from Tommy that Dr. Cadwell has a basketball that he would like. Alice makes an appointment for Dennis, but his tooth falls out before he can go. Henry catches the boys trying to glue the tooth back into Dennis' mouth. Dennis hopes George will go in his place and Martha forces George to go. Dennis goes with Mr. Wilson, but they go to see Dr. Cecil Cadwell, the wrong dentist. After realizing the mistake, they go to see Dr. Carl Cadwell and find out he is the twin brother of Cecil. Things do not go well for George and he leaves before the dentist can do anything. George tells Dennis that if he does not say anything to Martha, he will buy Dennis the basketball. Martha does find out, and as Dr. Walters is now back in town, she sets up an appointment for George.
100	30	"The Man Next Door"	Charles Barton	Budd Grossman	May 6, 1962
Mr. Wilson installs his own burglar alarm after a series of burglaries in the neighborhood by the Stocking Bandit. Dennis tells George that he thinks George's new neighbor, Marvin Sweetzer, is the Bandit. George dresses up in a disguise and goes outside to see if his dog Freemont would start barking. Alice calls the police. Sgt. Mooney arrives and finds out it is just George. Later, George starts to believe that Marvin is the Bandit. Dennis and George go looking around the outside of Marvin's house. Dennis drops his water pistol into the basement window and goes inside to get it. There he finds a lot of costume jewelry which Marvin sells. George sees it and thinks it is real. While trying to get the suitcase full of jewelry out the window as evidence, George falls into the basement. Marvin and Lillian come home and hear a noise in the basement. Because their phone is not hooked up yet, Marvin goes to the Mitchell house to call the police. While trying to get out, George gets stuck in the basement window. Sgt. Mooney shows up to find George again. All misunderstandings are straightened out and the real Bandit is eventually caught. Hal Hopper as Lou. Note: This is the last episode to feature Joseph Kearns as Mr. George Wilson.
101	31	"Dennis and the Dodger"	Charles Barton	John Elliotte & Herbert Finn	May 13, 1962
Mr. Wilson is going on a trip and will not be able to coach the town's pee-wee baseball team. Otis Quigley, though lacking experience, tells Dennis and Tommy that he will volunteer to coach the team. He hopes it will help advertise his store and improve sales. Dolly Quigley (Florence MacMichael) thinks her husband is crazy as he knows nothing about coaching. Otis visits the Mayor (Lyle Talbot) and asks about new uniforms for the boys. The Mayor knows that Sandy Koufax will be in town to visit his Aunt. The Mayor agrees to give the team new uniforms if Quigley can get Sandy and the Dodgers to play an exhibition game in town. Otis is working with the team when Sandy comes by. Sandy makes a suggestion about Dennis' pitching and Quigley, not knowing who Sandy is, tells him to mind his own business. The boys all crowd around Sandy and Otis feels unneeded. Later, Otis goes to Sandy's Aunt Harriet's house to apologize to him. Otis accidentally hits Sandy with a baseball bat. The next day, Quigley gets a call from the Mayor, who is furious with him. Dennis tells Otis that the team still needs him. At the next practice, Quigley is nervous around Sandy and the kids begin to question if he can really coach their team. That is until Quigley hits a home run off Sandy. The Mayor comes by and asks about the exhibition game. Sandy says he will see what he can do, but only if his good friend Otis is made Chairman of the Welcoming Committee. Note: Because Joseph Kearns died of a stroke on February 17, only Mrs. Wilson appears in this episode. It was rewritten with grocer Otis Quigley acting as the comic foil instead of Mr. Wilson.
102	32	"Dennis' Lovesick Friend"	Charles Barton	Phil Leslie & Keith Fowler	May 20, 1962
Because of something Dennis did to Margaret's doll, he has to play house with her for the rest of the day. George's Uncle Ned Matthews visits while George is out east settling an estate. He decides to plant flower bulbs to win a flower contest in the summer and beat Mrs. Hawkins (Lucille Wall), who won last year. Uncle Ned hurts his back. Dennis comes by and tells Ned how his older friend Jerry Simmons got into a fight with his girlfriend Helen Franklin (Cheryl Holdridge). Ned hopes to get Jerry to plant the bulbs. Ned tells Jerry that hard work will keep his mind off of Helen and Ned will pay him. Ned helps Dennis avoid having to play with Margaret. Jerry tries to work but keeps thinking of Helen and gets nothing done. Mrs. Hawkins comes by and claims that George's dog Freemont dug up her bulbs. Ned and Dennis go and talk to Helen. Dennis convinces her to make up with Jerry. Something Dennis later says causes Helen and Jerry to break up again. Helen offers to plant the bulbs, but she plants them all upside down. Jerry and Helen make up again and Dennis winds up having to spend an evening with Margaret. Note: Because Joseph Kearns died of a stroke on February 17, only Mrs. Wilson appears in this episode. It was rewritten with George's Uncle Ned acting as the comic foil instead of Mr. Wilson..
103	33	"John Wilson's Cushion"	Charles Barton	Phil Leslie & Keith Fowler	May 27, 1962
George's brother, John (Gale Gordon), comes to stay with Martha while George is out of town. John is a writer, but he is having trouble working without his old seat cushion, which he forgot to pack. He tries several other cushions but none are just right. Isabel Tolliver (Elvia Allman), president of the Ladies Literary Circle, comes by to meet John. She invites John to lecture at the club's next meeting. John tries to tell her how busy he is, but she will not take no for an answer. Meanwhile, Dennis tells Tommy that he will make John a cushion. Dennis covertly gets John's measurements and then goes to Quigley's market to get some goose feathers. What Quigley has turns out to be chicken feathers. John meets Quigley and does not make a good first impression when he accidentally makes a mess in the store. Dennis is able to get goose feathers from Margaret, but he has to play house with her first. Dennis comes by the Wilson house with John's cushion. But before he can give it to him, Isabel arrives. Something Dennis says, gets John out of having to do the lecture. Dennis then gives John the cushion. It feels like his old cushion and John is able to start writing. Templeton Fox as Mrs. Nolan. Note: This marks Gale Gordon's debut as John Wilson, George's brother. In this episode, however, it is stated that George Wilson is away on business and that John is a guest of the Wilsons. A new title sequence begins that includes Gale Gordon's name.
104	34	"John Wilson Wins a Chicken"	Charles Barton	Budd Grossman	June 3, 1962
Dennis is selling tickets for his class chicken raffle. After agreeing to sell a rare 1919 dime for $150, John Wilson buys ten raffle tickets from Dennis and ends up winning a chicken. Dennis and his friends are upset when John says he wants to cook the chicken for dinner. The children start a petition to save the chicken and go to Mrs. Elkins house. She calls John and asks him to spare the bird, but he tells her he is still going to eat it. Mrs. Elkins and the children then picket the Wilson house. Henry suggests that John spare the chicken in exchange for an already dressed bird. The children would take care of the chicken and find it another home. John agrees. The next day, Mr. Hanson, the coin collector, calls and says he is coming over to inspect the dime. John drops his dime near the chicken and believes that the bird swallowed it, which it did not. After Mr. Hanson leaves, John finds the dime. Henry finds a home for the chicken.
105	35	"The Bully"	Charles Barton	Budd Grossman	June 10, 1962
It has been eight months since Henry and George bought their rental house and it still has no occupant. Before he went on his trip East, George sold half his interest in the house to John. Dennis tells his parents about Gifford Kelly (Mickey Sholdar), the school bully. Alice wants Dennis to try to make friends with Gifford. Later, Henry tells John that a woman is interested in the house, but her husband wants to see it. Dennis comes home with black eye. Henry gives Dennis the go-ahead to fight back next time. John teaches Dennis how to fight and Dennis gives him a black eye. Dennis winds up giving Gifford a black eye. Mr. Kelly (Richard Reeves), Gifford's father, calls the Mitchell house wanting to speak with Henry. Henry is not there, but John is and he takes the call. Mr. Kelly thinks he is talking to Henry and John and him get into an argument. Mr. Kelly says he is coming right over. When Henry hears the name Mr. Kelly, he realizes that is the man that was interested in the house. Mr. Kelly and Gifford arrive and John pretends to be Henry. Dennis and his friends are watching and Dennis comes in to say that Gifford started the fight. Henry comes in the room, things get straightened out and Mr. Kelly still rents the house. Note: The house mentioned in this episode, of which John bought half of George's share, is the house Wilson and Mitchell originally bought in "Haunted House."
106	36	"The Club Initiation"	Charles Barton	Phil Leslie & Keith Fowler	June 17, 1962
John tells Martha that he will be playing golf with Dr. Fred Ferguson. Martha suggests that the Doctor check John out as he has not been sleeping well and it may be his nerves. Dennis wants to join an older boys' club run by a boy named Walter Hooper (Billy Hughes), but he does not want Dennis in. Mrs. Hooper tells Walter that he should let Dennis join. Walter comes up with a plan that if Dennis does not pass an initiation, he cannot join. Dennis visits John while he is practicing his putting. Something Dennis does causes John to do a lot of damage in the house. Hoping it will be too hard, Walter has Dennis find a goat, a derby hat and a bugle. Dennis finds a goat and puts it in John's garage. John goes in the garage, sees the goat and then tells Fred about it. Walter comes by and takes the goat out. John and Fred find nothing in the garage. Fred tells John they should skip the golf game and Fred wants to check John out. Henry sees the goat in his yard and puts it back in John's garage. John goes into the garage, sees the goat with a derby on and tells Fred. Walter once again takes the goat out. John and Fred again find nothing in the garage. John questions his sanity and goes to lay down. The goat winds up back in the garage. Fred goes into the garage and sees the goat wearing the derby with a bugle in its mouth. Dennis explains everything to John and John calls Fred. Nurse Jackson (Molly Dodd) tells John that Fred is not felling well. Dennis and some of the boys from Walter's club decide to start their own club. Note: Frank Cady, who went on to greater fame portraying Sam Drucker on Petticoat Junction and Green Acres, guest stars as Dr. Fred Ferguson. This also is the first mention of Eloise Wilson in the series, although not by name. Portrayed by Sara Seegar, Eloise's character would not join the cast until the next season.
107	37	"The Community Picnic"	Charles Barton	Phil Leslie & Keith Fowler	June 24, 1962
Henry, John, Otis Quigley and Lawrence Finch are going to sing as a Barbershop quartet at an upcoming community picnic. Jack Brady (Laurence Haddon) and Tiny Hawkins (Russ McCubbin) challenge Henry and John Wilson to compete against them in the sporting events at the picnic. Henry and John are practicing for the competition and John sends Dennis to the market to get him out of the way. At Quigley's market, Dennis winds up making a mess. It is the day of the picnic and the quartet perform. Then it is time for the boys competition. Because of some things Jack inadvertently does, Johnny Brady loses several contests. It is time for the men's competition. The Brady team and the Wilson team are tied, with the egg toss being the winning event. When Henry gets his hand stuck in a pickle jar, Dennis must fill in. Dennis and John win, but because Dennis used a hard boiled egg. They must now tell Brady. When Jack realizes that the two teams now wind up tied for first place, he does not get upset. Note: This marks the final appearance in the series of Sylvia Field, who played Martha Wilson.
108	38	"Dennis and the Witch Doctor"	Charles Barton	John Elliotte & Herbert Finn	July 1, 1962
Alice is going to bake a cake for John Wilson because he is all alone in the house. Outside, John and Mrs. Elkins get into a fender bender with their cars and John blames her for the accident. Dennis learns that John is writing a magazine article about voodoo. John shows him a voodoo doll and explains how to put a hex on someone and mentions Mrs. Elkins. Dennis, Tommy and Margaret visit Mrs. Elkins and tell her about the hex John put on her. She does not believe it but then some strange occurrences and odd accidents happen. Meanwhile, John tells Alice he was thinking of throwing a party to meet his new neighbors. He wants to show some films of tribal ceremonies that he has. Plus, he will send invitations with little voodoo dolls attached to them. Word starts to spend in the neighborhood that John is a witch doctor. Mrs. Elkins asks Sgt. Mooney to investigate John. John wears his witch doctor outfit to show Dennis and Henry. Mooney comes by, looks through the front window and sees John. John tells Henry that everyone he sent invitations to has turned him down. Dennis gets all his friends to go to John's party. Mrs. Elkins sees some children going into John's house and gets Sgt. Mooney and the parents to come over. They realize everything is perfectly innocent and join the party. Adrienne Marden as Mary Trimble. Note: Martha Wilson does not appear in this episode. Alice states that Martha "has gone back east for a while", presumably to stay with George, although that is never explicitly said.

=== Season 4 (1962–63) ===
For the final season, the title card was updated. All the episodes in the fourth and final season of Dennis the Menace: The Classic Series use the 1962-1963 title cards instead of the 1959-1962 title screen. No new episode was released on June 23, 1963, or June 30, 1963.

No. overall	No. in season	Title	Directed by	Written by	Original release date
109	1	"The Chinese Girl"	Charles Barton	Budd Grossman	September 30, 1962
Sen Yuen (Cherylene Lee), a girl from British Hong Kong, is staying with the Wilsons for a couple days while her father is upstate on business. John met Mr. Yuen when he was doing a magazine article in Hong Kong. Alice wants Dennis, Tommy and Seymour to go and meet her. Dennis becomes a fast friend of Sen Yuen and invites her over to his house. Later, Dennis gets dressed up and has a lunch of Chinese food with Sen Yuen at the Wilson house. Dennis cons John into buying banana splits for him, Tommy, Seymour and Sen Yuen at the malt shop. Margaret comes in and she is clearly not happy about Dennis and Sen Yuen. Sen Yuen gets a stomach ache from eating too much ice cream and Dennis brings her flowers. The next day, Dennis brings Sen Yuen some more flowers and she gives him a kiss. Sen Yuen leaves the room and John tells Dennis that Chinese girls often marry very young. And the parents of Chinese children often sign marriage contracts when the children are young. When Sen Yuen says that her father will be coming by later, Dennis leaves. Dennis misunderstands something that Henry says about Mr. Yuen and contracts and leaves the house. Mr. Yuen and Sen Yuen arrive at the Mitchell's and Dennis is nowhere to be found. Eloise mentions to Henry and Alice what John said about parents arranging their children's marriage. Dennis and Margaret show up. Dennis tells Sen Yuen that he cannot marry her as he is engaged to Margaret. Things get straightened out and everyone has a laugh about it. Note: This marks the debut of Eloise Wilson, John Wilson's wife, played by Sara Seegar. They now live in the house formerly occupied by George and Martha, and John states that George and Martha have sold them the house. This marks the last mention of Martha Wilson in the series, and the last mention of George by name.
110	2	"You Go Your Way"	Charles Barton	Clifford Goldsmith & John Elliotte	October 7, 1962
Dennis overhears part of a conversation between John and Eloise in which they are arguing about the card game they played with the Mitchell's last night. Dennis does not know they are talking about cards. Meanwhile, Miss Esther Cathcart (Mary Wickes) and Miss Lucy Tarbell (Alice Pearce) are talking about old boyfriends. Dennis comes by wanting to cut Esther's grass. He tells the ladies about the Wilson's discussion and they misunderstand and think the Wilsons are splitting up. Esther and Lucy go by the Wilson house. They see Eloise getting into a car with a suitcase that John wanted repaired. They hear Eloise tell John they should not be partners anymore, referring to the card game. Each woman now sets their sights on being John's girlfriend. Rumors around the neighborhood begin to fly about the Wilson breakup. Esther and Lucy each enlists Dennis to find out more about John's situation. Esther is at the beauty parlor and tells Mabel Simms that Eloise left John and how handsome John is. Eloise is in another room and overhears her. Eloise then asks beautician Katherine Prescott (Viola Harris) for a complete make-over. Lucy brings John some fried chicken and then Esther brings some pies. John has no idea what is going on. Eloise arrives elegantly dressed up. Things get straightened out and John forgives Dennis for starting the trouble. Helen Kleeb as Mrs. Drum. Note: Dennis briefly refers to George Wilson as "the other Mr. Wilson" early in the episode. This is Alice Pearce's first of two appearances as Lucy Tarbell during the fourth season. The second was in "Jane Butterfield Says."
111	3	"Dennis and the Circular Circumstances"	Charles Barton	Herbert Finn	October 14, 1962
Dennis needs to earn one more dollar to buy a toy gun. Meanwhile, Mrs. Elkins is running for Assemblywoman. Henry and Dennis pass by her campaign headquarters and decide to go in. Dennis would like a job delivering circulars for Mrs. Elkins, but she says he is not old enough. John is writing an article outside on the patio because Eloise is having work done in the house. John pulls some strings to get Dennis the job (and also get him out of his hair). For fifty cents, Tommy offers to help Dennis. When they are supposed to start delivering, Tommy tells Dennis he had to sneak out of the house because he was supposed to stay in to study. Dennis promises to not tell anyone. Ted McNulty talks Dennis into switching territories so Ted can deliver by his girlfriends house. Ted, however, throws his circulars in a trash bin. Because of Tommy's help, Dennis is quickly done. Mrs. Elkins finds out about the circulars in the trash and is upset with Dennis. She comes by the Mitchell house to tell them what happened. Henry asks Dennis about the circulars and he says he traded with another boy. John is there and leaves to do some investigating. Alice asks Dennis how he got done so quickly, but he cannot say anything because of his promise to Tommy. Thanks to Tommy and Mr. Wilson, things get straightened out. Lucille Wall as Home Owner.
112	4	"The Little Judge"	Charles Barton	Budd Grossman	October 21, 1962
Eliose reads in the paper that Judge McConnell (Arthur Peterson) has designated this Thursday as "Children's Day in Court". Mrs. Elkins tells John that he is burning trash past the allowed time, but he does not care. Dennis tells John he has been elected judge for Children's Day. Sgt. Mooney gives Mr. Wilson a ticket after the complaint from Mrs. Elkins. Mooney brings John in front of Judge McConnell who fines him $25. John requests a trial on Children's Day. John hosts a party for the children in hopes of influencing them in his favor. After Mrs. Elkins comes by and accuses John of trying to bribe the children, the disappointed children leave. In court, Prosecutor Tommy presents his case. Defender Margaret is then next and calls up surprise witness Henry Mitchell. The children find John not guilty. But Dennis orders him to not burn trash past the allowed time and he is ordered to buy Banana Splits for all of them, which will cost him more than the original fine.
113	5	"Poor Mr. Wilson"	Jeffrey Hayden	Joe Bigelow & Jay Sommers	October 28, 1962
Mr. Wilson is on a diet and feels weak. Eloise is spring cleaning and is having some couches reupholstered. John's money falls through a hole in his pocket while he was at Quigley's market and thus, he cannot pay Dennis for washing his car. Dennis misinterprets "the market" as referring to the stock market rather than the grocery and as a result, mistakenly thinks Mr. Wilson is broke. Because Eloise won't give John any food, he goes to the Mitchell house and begs Dennis for something to eat. Several other misunderstandings lead even the Mitchells to believe John is broke. Something Henry says to John, leads John to believe that Henry was trying to ask for money. Dennis goes all out to help his friend. This includes buying groceries for the Wilsons and leaving them on their doorstep. Dennis also puts on a benefit show with his friends, using the admission fees to make money for Mr. Wilson. John comes over to complain about the noise and Dennis gives him the money and explains why he's giving it to him. John straightens out the misunderstanding and tells Dennis what a good friend he is. As a thank you, John takes the Mitchell's and Dennis' friends out for ice cream. But then he has to borrow money from Henry to pay the bill. Doodles Weaver as Needy Man #2.
114	6	"Dennis in Gypsyland"	Charles Barton	John Elliotte & Herbert Finn	November 4, 1962
Mr. Wilson's article about gypsies is returned with the request that he get to know them and research them further before submitting another. John tells Eloise that he tried talking to them but they are clannish and very suspicious of strangers. Therefore, he dresses in full gypsy attire and travels on a donkey to a local gypsy camp in order to best observe them. He kisses Eloise goodbye and his fake mustache unknowingly sticks to her cheek. Dennis comes by and Eloise sends him after John with the mustache. Papa Gamali (Nestor Paiva), the leader of the Gypsies, and Pietro find John and Dennis in the forest. John claims Dennis is his son. Back at camp, John and Dennis have something to eat and meet Gamali's daughter, Lutana. John performs a gesture that, unbeknownst to him, is a wedding proposal to Lutana. Dennis manages to get home and tell everyone what happened. He leads his parents and Eloise to the location of the camp, but the Gypsies are gone. They went into town to get things for the wedding. Back at camp, the wedding is about to take place. After Sgt. Mooney, The Mitchells and Eloise rescue John, Sgt. Mooney inadvertently makes the same wedding proposal gesture. Hugh Sanders as the Police Chief.
115	7	"The New Principal"	Charles Barton	Phil Leslie & Keith Fowler	November 11, 1962
Dennis is looking forward to pitching in the baseball game against Middlebury the next day. Dennis and Mr. Spivey (Leslie Barrett), his school's new principal, get off on the wrong foot after the principal takes a remark about his height the wrong way. He threatens to kick Dennis off the baseball team if he observes any further impudence. Johnny Brady wants Dennis off the team, so he draws an unflattering picture of Mr. Spivey on a paper with Dennis' name on it. This results in Dennis being kicked off the team. Miss Elmore, Dennis' teacher, asks if his father could come to school to vouch for him. Dennis tells her that Henry is out of town. Margaret tells Mr. Quigley and Tommy tells Mr. Finch what happened to Dennis. John learns from Dennis what happened. John and then Mr. Quigley go to see Mr. Spivey pretending to be Dennis' father. To straighten things out, Mr. Spivey takes the two men to see Dennis. Mr. Finch then shows up claiming to be Henry. Dennis admits that none of the men are his father. Meanwhile, Henry comes home early and goes to pick up Dennis. When he realizes what the men did to help Dennis, Mr. Spivey puts him back on the team. The men and Dennis leave. Henry shows up and introduces himself to Mr. Spivey. Mr. Spivey thinks he is just another man trying to help Dennis and gets a confused Henry to leave. Note: This is the last episode that explicitly mentions that John Wilson was not the original Mr. Wilson and had recently bought the house from George. It also is the final appearance in the series of Charles Lane, who played Mr. Finch, owner of the local drugstore. Also in an apparent blooper contradicting information from earlier in the series, Margaret announces to the new principal and the class that her last name is Harrington, instead of the previously-established Wade on both this series and the comic strip.
116	8	"San Diego Safari"	Charles Barton	Joe Bigelow & Jay Sommers	November 18, 1962
Mr. Wilson is selected to pick up a chimpanzee from the San Diego Zoo, so the Wilsons and the Mitchells take a trip there. When they get to their hotel, they learn that Mr. Wiggins (Forrest Lewis), their motel manager, is allergic to animals. At the zoo, Mr. Gordon (Arthur Peterson Jr.), the zoo director, welcomes the two families. The Zoo Guide (Bob Hastings) takes them on a tour. Mr. Gordon then gives John the chimpanzee whose name is Bobo. Back at the hotel, Mr. Wiggins insists that Bobo stay in his little cage outside by the car. Bobo gets agitated any time John tries to leave him. That night, they try and put Bobo in the car, but he starts to honk the horn. John sneaks Bobo into his room, but Eloise wants the chimp gone. When Mr. Wiggins comes by, John covers Bobo in the bed and has Eloise hide in the closet. Eloise then gets locked in the closet. Before Mr. Wiggins brings the key to the closet, Dennis puts Bobo in another room. But there is a window open in that room and Bobo gets out. Mr. Wiggins finds Bobo in his office. Mr. Wiggins tells the Wilsons and the Mitchells he must be cured because he is no longer sneezing around Bobo. But then Bobo starts sneezing around Mr. Wiggins.
117	9	"Dennis at Boot Camp"	Charles Barton	John Elliotte	November 25, 1962
While still in San Diego, the Wilsons are visited by their nephew, Ted (Allan Hunt), a young sailor. John learns that his old shipmate, Capt. Stone (Roy Roberts), is in command of the Boot Camp. Despite it being against Navy regulations, Ted reluctantly gives John and Dennis a ride in the Navy laundry truck to pick up John's car. Meanwhile, Capt. Stone is expecting underwater demolitions expert H. Baker for the Visitors Day demonstration. John and Dennis hide in the back of the truck when Ted has to pick up Chief Bundy (John Cliff). They are unable to get out of the truck and are brought back to the naval base. Dennis is put into a laundry bag. John puts on a Navy uniform that he finds and is brought into the barracks. Lt. Alden (Robert Dornan) confronts John and because he sees the name on a trunk, John claims to be H. Baker. Dennis tells John to just explain things to Capt. Stone. John says that because of an old accident, Stone might be mad at him. John has Dennis follow him as Lt. Alden takes John to get changed for the dive he is to make. Capt. Stone explains to John what he is to do and because John has on a scuba mask, Stone does not recognize him. The real Baker shows up and now Capt. Stone recognizes the other man as John. Because of something John does, the demonstration starts early. The Admiral commends Capt. Stone for showing the Navy is ready at anytime. John and Capt. Stone have one more run in with each other.
118	10	"Henry's New Job"	Charles Barton	John Elliotte	December 2, 1962
Mr. Gabe Bromley (Roland Winters) calls Henry with a job offer. Henry's pay would be doubled, but he would have to move overseas to Calpuna. Eloise tells Alice and Dennis how miserable she was when she was there, but John tells Henry how wonderful it is. Alice reluctantly agrees to make the move. Dennis goes to Henry's boss, Mr. Trask of Trask Engineering, and asks if he could not stop Henry from taking the other job. Mr. Trask is surprised to hear about Henry's move and says there is nothing he can do. Dennis tells Tommy that he is running away from home. John finds out that Mr. Trask kept Henry busy so he could not meet with Mr. Bromley and John confronts Trask about it. John tells Henry what Trask did. Mr. Bromley is waiting at John's house until Henry can arrive. John tries to boost Henry's image to Mr. Bromley. But in the process, he actually has the opposite effect, and Bromley decides he does not want Henry. When Henry finds out that Bromley wanted a "Yes Man", he is glad it did not work out. But then Henry receives a telegram saying Trask has fired him. Alice finds the note saying Dennis ran away. Tommy brings Alice and Henry to the junkyard that Dennis was hiding in. They let Dennis know that they are not moving. Mr. Wilson and Dennis find a way for Henry to get his job back with a promotion and a raise in pay.
119	11	"Wilson's Second Childhood"	Charles Barton	Phil Leslie & Keith Fowler	December 16, 1962
Mr. Wilson's editor wants him to write an article about the changing behaviors of modern children. The editor wants John to spend a day doing things with children. John refuses to do the assignment. But, when he is reminded about a luncheon with Mrs. Elkins to raise money for cats, John decides to write the article. John tells Dennis he is going to play with him and his friends. Surprisingly, Dennis is not thrilled about the idea. John tells Dennis, Tommy and Seymour to treat him not as an adult, but as another child and call him Tuby. They play in the park and then John buys ice cream for everyone. Margaret and Lillian come by and John winds up jumping rope with the girls. A photographer from the newspaper takes a picture of John and then John has to buy it off of him so it does not get printed. The boys play catch and John misses the ball which goes into a fountain. While John is in the fountain getting the ball, Sgt. Mooney comes by and gives him a $5 ticket. John pays the ice cream man to stop driving around the neighborhood. They then go burrow riding. Mrs. Elkins comes by to collect $25 from John for the cats. It is turning out to be an expensive day for John. That evening John throws a weenie roast for the kids. While starting the fire for the grill, Dennis accidentally burns all of John's notes that he took during the day. Dennis suggests that John spend the whole next day with the boys. Note: One of Dennis' friends is played by a young Kurt Russell.
120	12	"Jane Butterfield Says"	Charles Barton	John Elliotte	December 23, 1962
Mr. Krinkie (Charles Seel) asks Mr. Wilson to take over an advice-to-the-lovelorn newspaper column for a few weeks. John thinks he will have every single woman in town happily married by the time he finishes. And he will be paid $2000 if the column is a success. John pays Dennis to put up flyers advertising the "Ask Jane Butterfield" column. But John does not want anyone to know he is writing the column. Miss Esther Cathcart and Miss Lucy Tarbell are both after Sgt. Mooney. Miss Cathcart is upset when Lucy tells her that she had lunch with Mooney and he's coming back for dinner. Esther later calls Police Chief Doyle (Stafford Repp) complaining about prowlers and wants him to send over Mooney. Dennis figures out that both Esther and Lucy have written to Jane Butterfield for advice on how to get Mooney. He then tells John what he found out. John gets a letter from Mooney asking Jane Butterfield how he can get rid of two women chasing him without hurting their feelings. John suggests that Mooney tell the women he has four ex-wives that he is sending alimony to. And he would like a fifth wife to help with his six children. Mooney tells this story to Esther, but she does not care and considers the two now engaged. While Esther answers her phone, Mooney runs out of the house. Esther goes to talk to Chief Doyle about Mooney's ex-wives and how she is now engaged to him. Mooney tells Doyle it was all a story he got from Jane Butterfield. Doyle calls Krinkie to complain. Krinkie drops the column and John, having already spent the money he thought he was going to get, is only paid $50. Note: Jane Butterfield Says marks the final appearance in the series of Mary Wickes, who played Esther Cathcart, and the second and final appearance of the fourth season by Alice Pearce as Lucy Tarbell. It was the penultimate episode of the only season to not include a Christmas-themed episode.
121	13	"Dennis and the Hermit"	Charles Barton	Phil Leslie & Keith Fowler	December 30, 1962
Henry and Dennis are to go bowling that evening. Henry gets a call from his boss, Mr. Trask, inviting him to dinner that night to entertain a client. Dennis is friends with a hermit named Mr. Meekin (Edgar Buchanan), who lives in a shack out in the woods. Something Dennis says leads Mr. Wilson to think that Meekin fought in the Civil War with General Lee. John would love to get his life story for an article. Dennis and Tommy are apparently the only people that Meekin will talk to. John promises to take Dennis bowling if he talks to Meekin about an interview. Dennis talks to Meekin, but Meekin says he will not talk to anyone. But then Meekin changes his mind. John comes by the shack, but his first encounter with Meekin does not go well and Meekin chases John away. John wants Dennis to go and interview Meekin. John and Henry will dress up in a cow costume and listen from outside the shack. That plan does not work out either. Meekin finally agrees to talk to John if John chops a bunch of fire wood for him. When it is finally time to get the hermit's story, John finds out that Lee was Mr. Meekin's wife. Because he promised, an exhausted John still has to go bowling with Dennis.
122	14	"My Uncle Ned"	Charles Barton	Joe Bigelow & Jay Sommers	January 6, 1963
Mr. Wilson has written a book about his eccentric Uncle Ned (Edward Everett Horton). But Ned thinks the stories in the book are incorrect, and refuses to sign a release for it to be published. John suggests that the two get together to talk about it more. Uncle Ned decides to travel down state to John's house. Not knowing this, John travels to Ned's place. Once at Ned's place, John calls Dennis and tells him to make sure Ned stays there because he and Eloise are driving back. John calls Dennis again to tell him that there is a terrible storm and the bridge is washed out. Dennis tells John that a telegram came for him saying that Charles D. Winfield (Harry Worth), the publisher, will be arriving today. John does not want Ned to talk to Winfield alone, so Dennis has to keep Ned busy. Dennis takes Ned to the park where they run into Sgt. Mooney. Ned manages to pick Mooney's pockets and then returns the items. While cashing a check at Quigley's market, Ned flim flam's Quigley out of some additional money. Winfield waits at the Mitchell house while Henry looks for Ned. Ned then tries to buy two student movie tickets. Henry finds the two and brings them back to the house. Ned tells Winfield he will not allow the book to be published. When Ned finds out from the publisher how much money could be made, he decides to write his own book. Alvy Moore as Movie Theater Manager.
123	15	"Junior Astronaut"	Jeffrey Hayden	Joe Bigelow & Jay Sommers	January 13, 1963
Dennis is dreaming that he is an astronaut circling the earth in a capsule and Mr. Wilson is in charge of mission control. John is named chairman of a saving-stamps campaign for the Junior Astronauts. He is trying to come up with a slogan that will encourage children to buy the stamps. Dennis suggests running a contest and the student that collects the most stamps wins a trip to Cape Canaveral to meet an astronaut. Mr. Sylvester (C. Lindsay Workman), from the Treasury Dept., comes by to see how John is doing. Dennis mentions to Mr. Sylvester the idea for a contest and Sylvester is all for it. But Sylvester says there is no money allocated for the trip. Dennis says John will pay for it and John reluctantly agrees. After a couple weeks, Dennis and Johnny Brady are leading the contest. Dennis is doing odd jobs to earn money to buy more stamps. But then Dennis comes down with the Chicken Pox and has to stay in bed. He is disappointed that he will not win the contest and get to meet an astronaut. Mr. Sylvester tells John how pleased they are in Washington over the success of his contest idea. John asks Mr. Sylvester for a favor. Mr. Sylvester visits Dennis and tells him he has something that will make him feel better. Henry turns on the TV and Project Mercury spokesman "Shorty" Powers says hello to Dennis. Shorty tells Dennis that he will make him a full fledged honorary astronaut. Mr. Sylvester gives Dennis an official astronaut pin. Note: John Wilson says briefly early in the episode, "I wasn't living here last year," the last allusion in the series to his not always having lived at 625 Elm Street. There is no mention of George or Martha Wilson. Also, Dennis's space mission in his dream is named "Menace I." This is perhaps the only time the word "menace" is mentioned during the series.
124	16	"Wilson's Little White Lie"	Charles Barton	Budd Grossman	January 20, 1963
John Wilson has been very busy writing articles and would like to take one day off. Because it has been a while, Eloise thinks he should see Dr. Baker (Hardie Albright) for a check up. When Dennis comes by to ask John to go to the sports show with him, John pretends to be sick. Dennis tells his parents how sick John is. Henry and Alice come by to visit John and he has to continue his charade. Later, Dennis and some of his friends come by to give John some candy. Just to get at John, Eloise sends the children up to John's room. Dennis tells John that they spread the word about him being sick. Dr. Baker is the next to visit John and tells him he better be at the hospital later for that check up. Baker then looks in on Dennis and his tonsils and says they will have to come out soon. The boys see Reverend Stone (Arthur Malet) go into the Wilson house. Sgt. Mooney and Mrs. Elkins come by and, misunderstanding what they overhear, they think John is not long for this world. John tells Eloise that he is not going to the hospital, he is going to the sports show. Thanks to another misunderstanding, John does wind up at the hospital. Dennis decides to have his tonsils out and Eloise sets it up so Dennis and John share a room.
125	17	"Dennis, the Rain Maker"	Charles Barton	Phil Leslie & Keith Fowler	January 27, 1963
Mr. Wilson hopes to buy an old Native American pot from a Mrs. Schooner. He would like to give it to his Alumni Society and be named Alumnus of the Year. Meanwhile, Henry desperately wants to get out of playing golf with his boss Mr. Trask and says he would give $10.00 for a rain storm. But it has not rained in 10 days. Mr. Wilson gives Dennis a book called Secrets of the Indian Rain Dance. Addison Brock (Jonathan Hole) from John's Alma Mater drops by. John assures Addison that he will be able to buy the pot. Dennis and his friends dress up in Native American outfits. Mrs. Schooner comes by the Wilson house. Dennis and his friends also come by and Mrs. Schooner is impressed with their rain dance. But some of the weeds that the boys are dancing with causes Mrs. Schooner to have a hayfever attack. She leaves and takes her pot with her. Mr. Trask calls Henry and says something came up and he cannot play golf. Henry is thrilled and calls one of his friends to see if he will play. Mike Crowley, photographer for the newspaper, tells Dennis and the boys that Mr. Krinkie would like a picture of them doing a rain dance. John and Mrs. Schooner dress up in Native American outfits and John finally buys the pot from her. Crowley and the boys come by and John and Mrs. Schooner join the boys in a rain dance. Henry and his friend are golfing and it starts to rain. Later, Addison comes by to pick up the pot. Dennis looks on the bottom of the pot and sees "Made in Japan".
126	18	"The Creature with the Big Feet"	Charles Barton	Phil Leslie & Keith Fowler	February 3, 1963
Dennis has sent away for some large novelty shoes that are shaped like feet. Eloise reads John an article in the newspaper about a large monster that has reportedly tried to take a pig from a local farm. John thinks it is all made up. But then he sees large footprints in his back yard. Since his editor Mr. Fielding (Vaughn Taylor) wants exciting stories, John decides to add to the story by hoping to capture the monster. John acquires a pig and Dennis and Mrs. Elkins see it. Mrs. Elkins intends to get a picture of the pig that evening and then turn John into the authorities. Meanwhile, John digs a pit in his backyard and wants to place the pig by it as bait. Thinking that they are helping John, Dennis, Tommy and Seymour fill the pit in with dirt. Not wanting them to know about the monster, John tells the boys that he dug the pit because he thinks there might be a prowler around. Dennis and Tommy ask Sgt. Mooney the best way to catch a prowler. Mooney decides to check out John's yard that night and brings a photographer with him. Mrs. Elkins and Mable come by as well. Henry sees something moving around in John's yard and goes out to check. The boys are up in the tree-house with a net. Mrs. Elkins trips over the pig causing a commotion. The boys drop their net over Henry. Mrs. Elkins then falls in the pit. Mooney grabs Henry, who hits Mooney on the head with a frying pan. John winds up in the pit as well and the photographer is getting pictures of all of this. The pictures are printed in the paper and John finds out about Dennis' novelty shoes.
127	19	"Dennis, the Confused Cupid"	Charles Barton	Phil Leslie & Keith Fowler	February 10, 1963
Dennis is interested in learning about love. His parents and Mr. and Mrs. Wilson both tell him how wonderful love is, but he just does not understand. Meanwhile, John decides to not be such a "pack rat" and wants to throw away some of his old articles. Dennis and Tommy are playing catch in the park and talking about love. Teenager Pete Owens walks by and tells the boys he's interested in a girl sitting on the bench. Tommy says that she is Susie Walker and she just moved next door to him. Tommy suggests Pete go talk to Susie. While going through the papers that John threw away, Dennis and Tommy find an old love letter. The boys decide to help Pete by writing his name on the letter and putting it in Susie's mailbox. They don't know that Pete has already spoken with Susie and set up a date. Dennis shows Eloise the love letters that John threw away and she gets upset with John. Dennis watches as John and Eloise get into an argument. Dennis then sees Alice get upset when Henry makes fun of some of the love letters he wrote. Susie finds the letter Dennis left. She misunderstands some of the old time references in it and thinks Pete is making fun of her. Susie goes and tells off Pete. Dennis finds a way to get Susie and Pete back together. His parents and Mr. and Mrs. Wilson make up but then Dennis manages to get the two couples mad at each other again.
128	20	"Dennis Goes to Washington"	Charles Barton	Phil Leslie & Keith Fowler	February 17, 1963
Dennis is appointed by Mayor Yates to go to Washington D.C. to ask their senator to support the creation of a national forest at nearby Hickory Mountain. Mr. Wilson goes along to cover the story and thinks his contacts there will be the thing that allows the idea of a forest to be realized. At the hotel, Dennis works it so he will be rooming with John. When John cannot get in to see Senator Philbin (Bill Zuckert) right away, he takes Dennis and his parents sight seeing. They see the Jefferson and Lincoln Memorials and the Washington Monument. They then go to see the White House. Later, Dennis runs into page boy Freddy Thorpe (Pat Close) who he knew from camp. They set up a lunch date. Dennis and John finally get to see Senator Philbin and he claims he likes the idea of a national forest. But then Philbin gives the two a quick brush-off. John wants to go to see one of his contacts, Senator Bruford. But it turns out Bruford is no longer a senator. John then goes to see his old friend Judge Harvey Kingston (Harry Antrim). Harvey does not remember John but pretends he does. Harvey sends John to the Forestry Department and they send John somewhere else. John is sent to several other places and gets nothing accomplished. The next day, Dennis is with Freddy and John hopes to see Senator Charles McDermott (Howard Wendell). When John and the Mitchells get to McDermott's office, Dennis and Freddy are already there. Charles is Freddy's uncle and he agreed to Dennis' suggestion about the national forest.
129	21	"The Big Basketball Game"	Charles Barton	Phil Leslie & Keith Fowler	February 24, 1963
Stretch Nichols, the school basketball team's star player, gets teased about his worn-out clothes and shoes by Johnny Brady. Mr. Brady brags to Mr. Quigley about how Johnny is going to lead the team to victory in the upcoming game. Stretch tells Dennis that he has decided to quit the team and get an after-school job. When Mr. Quigley hears that Stretch quit he bets Mr. Brady that the team will lose. A sympathetic Dennis persuades Mr. Quigley to help by buying Stretch new clothes and giving him an after-school job making deliveries. Stretch starts to feel better about himself and rejoins the team in time for the big game. Dennis invites Stretch and Mr. Quigley over for dinner. When Stretch shows up, he is limping because his feet are sore from the new shoes. Henry and Mr. Quigley take Stretch over to see Coach Gilmore (Bob Hastings). Stretch's feet are so swollen that he cannot put on his gym shoes. The basketball game has started and Stretch is still soaking his feet. It is the fourth quarter and the home team is losing. Dennis suggests that Stretch play barefoot. Stretch leads the team to a victory and Quigley gladly pays off on his bet. Note: The Big Basketball Game marks the final appearances in the series of Mr. Quigley, who was played by Willard Waterman, and Dennis' longtime nemesis Johnny Brady, played by Gregory Irvin. Gale Gordon and Sara Seegar do not appear in the episode, under the guise that John Wilson went from Washington D.C. to New York City to see his publisher. It also is the first episode since "The Party Line" in season 1 that does not include a Mr. or Mrs. Wilson character.
130	22	"Wilson's Allergy"	Charles Barton	Budd Grossman	March 3, 1963
Mr. Wilson is convinced that he is allergic to Dennis because he sneezes every time he is around. Henry and Alice realize that Dennis has changed his bath soap recently, so he takes a bath with his old soap to see if that is the problem. John still sneezes, so he tells Dennis that they will have to stay away from each other from now on. John is having a hard time writing an acticle and he thinks it might be because it is too quiet in the house. He invites some of Dennis' friends over to make background noise, but that does not help. John starts to realize he cannot write at his best without Dennis bothering him. He resorts to playing a tape of Dennis asking annoying questions, but it is still not the same. John decides he will have to move away. Dennis decides to run away so the Wilsons will not have to move. He runs into three hobos named Cecil Thorpe III, Slim and Harv (Murray Alper). Dennis tells them the reason he ran away. Henry and Alice notify the police about Dennis and then go searching for him with John. The three are talking to Sgt. Mooney when the hobos walk in carrying a sleeping Dennis. Everyone learns that it was a hair tonic Dennis was using that made John sneeze.
131	23	"Baby Booties"	Charles Barton	Joe Bigelow & Jay Sommers	March 10, 1963
Eloise knits several baby booties to use as golf club covers for a new set of clubs she bought for John's birthday. Alice and Eloise make Dennis promise to not say anything about the clubs and the surprise birthday party. Dennis tells Tommy about the booties, and Tommy says it means that Mr. and Mrs. Wilson are going to have a baby. Dennis wants to earn some money to buy John some cigars. Dennis tells Mr. Fleckner, who runs a diaper service, about the Wilsons. Mr. Fleckner pays Dennis $2 for the tip. Dennis then tells the milkman. The milkman visits John and then John gets a cryptic phone call from Dr. Johnson (Alan Hewitt). John starts to wonder what is going on after he gets a visit from Mr. Fleckner. John gets a phone call from the knit shop about the yarn Eloise needed to finish the booties. John faints and then has a dream a nurse hands him his baby and it looks like Dennis. Something John sees leads him to believe Eloise is having twins and he faints again. John comes to in his bed and Dr. Johnson gives him a shot. Alice tells Eloise that she is knitting booties for Henry's golf clubs. Dennis sees Alice knitting and goes to tell Mr. Fleckner and collects another $2. Mr. Fleckner goes to see Henry and Henry now thinks Alice is having a baby and he faints. Dennis tells his parents that he thought Alice and Eloise were having babies. Alice explains to Henry about the booties being for the golf clubs. John experiences a couple more baby misunderstandings before learning the truth.
132	24	"My Four Boys"	Charles Barton	Budd Grossman	March 17, 1963
Dennis and his friends ask John to join their club and it would only cost him $7. He tells the boys to leave. Mr. Griffin (Harvey Korman) calls to inform John that he won a slogan contest for a soap company. John tells Eloise that the contest required the entrants to be parents. John lied and said he had four sons and Mr. Griffin says he wants to come by to meet them. John hopes to pass off Dennis and his three friends as his own children. He invites the children over to his house for a party the next day. The boys will come to his party if John joins their club, which he does, but only pays them $2. The boys gather some old wood planks to build their clubhouse. Seymour drops one in the street. A car drives over it and gets four flat tires. The boys are at the party at John's house and he has bought them a lot of cake and ice cream. Eloise happens to run into Mr. Burrows, whose car got the flat tires. He asks about four boys and she directs him to her house. John tells the boys he wants to play a joke on a friend and they have to pretend to be his sons. Mr. Burrows comes to the house and John thinks he is from the contest people. Mr. Burrows demands John pay for the tires. The boys are disappointed with John when they find out the real reason he wants them to pretend to be his sons. They want to leave. John offers to pay the boys if they stay. Mr. Griffin shows up and tells John that he won the 268th prize which is a pair of shoes for each of the boys. John thought he was going to win a large sum of money, but the day instead cost him a lot of money. Note: My Four Boys is Korman's second guest appearance in the series. He was the real-estate agent in Season 3's "Haunted House."
133	25	"Dennis and the Homing Pigeons"	Charles Barton	Phil Leslie & Keith Fowler	March 24, 1963
Dennis and Tommy are feeding pigeons by the park fountain. Two guys, one dressed as a woman and the other as a baby in a carriage, come by. They explain that they have to do this as an initiation to a college fraternity. Dennis and Tommy think about using a couple of the birds as homing pigeons. Meanwhile, stockbroker Mr. Mathews (Tyler McVey) calls and gives John a stock tip. Mathews is going on vacation and he tells John to buy the stock right away. John writes the name of the company on a pad of paper. John tells Henry and Alice about the stock and Henry wants to invest as well. Dennis and Tommy capture two pigeons. Eloise gives Dennis a scratch pad to use for the notes without knowing that was the one that John had the stock tip written on. After writing a note on the other side, Dennis attaches the page with the stock tip to a pigeon and releases it. At the park, John tries to catch the pigeon but Sgt. Mooney comes by and scares the birds away. Dennis tells John that he was told that the birds roost in the abandoned Mulligan house at night. Meanwhile, the two pledges are told to spend the night at the Mulligan house. That night, some of the fraternity brothers are at the house waiting to scare the pledges. John, Henry, Dennis and Tommy show up. Both John and Henry are frightened by the fraternity brothers dressed up in scary outfits. They eventually find out that it is just the college guys. Soon after, John and Henry manage to catch the elusive bird. When they get home they see a story in the evening paper about the bankruptcy of the company they wanted to invest in.
134	26	"A Tax on Cats"	Charles Barton	Phil Leslie & Keith Fowler	March 31, 1963
Mrs. Elkins' cat has been bothering Mr. Wilson; he thinks cats are a nuisance. John goes to talk to Sgt. Mooney and finds out there is an ordinance that requires cats to be licensed. Any unlicensed cat can be impounded. But Mooney tells John the law is just too hard to enforce. Mooney says that if John can round up a dozen cats in 24 hours, he will put the law back into practice. At first John is reluctant to take on the job, but then he decides to do it. Dennis, Tommy and Seymour are against the idea of John catching the cats and plan to stop him whenever they can. Dennis lets Mrs. Elkins know that John is trying to catch her cat. She turns the garden hose on John to stop him. John tricks the boys into helping him by saying he is really helping them find homes. John brings a large number of cats to Mr. Tibbitt (Johnny Lee) at the city pound. Dennis and Tommy go to the pound and talk to Mr. Tibbitt. They tell him that they will take all the cats that were not claimed to John's house. The boys think that John will give them a good home. When John gets to his house, the boys show him all the cats they brought him. Sgt. Mooney shows up and fines John for not having the cats licensed.
135	27	"The Uninvited Guest"	Charles Barton	Budd Grossman	April 7, 1963
Henry and Alice read about another burglary in the neighborhood, making it the fourth in the last three weeks. Henry is worried because he has to go out of town for a couple days. When Alice is suddenly called out of town, Dennis has to stay overnight at the Wilson house. Because Eloise is getting over a cold, Dennis has to share a room with John. That night, John is asleep and Dennis goes to the kitchen for something to eat. Dennis makes some noise and John thinks the burglar is in the house. John calls the police and speaks with Lt. Wheeler (Stafford Repp), who sends Sgt. Mooney to the house. After discovering Dennis in the kitchen, John sees there is someone outside the house. John hits the person on the head with a pan and it turns out to be Mooney. Between other noises and Dennis bothering him, John goes to sleep in the Mitchell house. Dennis sees a light on in his house and calls the police. While Dennis, John and Sgt. Mooney are at the Mitchell house, the burglar (James Millhollin) breaks into John's house. After some more confusion, the burglar is caught by Dennis and his water pistol. Because he has to drive, Mooney handcuffs the burglar to John with Dennis' handcuffs. Dennis then remembers he does not have the key.
136	28	"Dennis Plays Robin Hood"	Charles Barton	Phil Leslie & Keith Fowler	April 14, 1963
Dennis has a new bow and arrow set. The arrows have rubber tips and he accidentally hits Mr. Wilson with one. John suggests that Dennis, Tommy and Seymour go somewhere else and play Robin Hood. Mrs. Elkins asks to borrow John's lawn edger. He has one but he claims he does not. The boys stop Sgt. Mooney in the park and tell him he is the Sheriff of Nottingham. Mrs. Elkins buys a second hand edger from Mr. Duncan. The boys ask Eloise if there is anything they can take to pretend to give to the poor. She tells them to look by the garage. Dennis takes John's lawn edger to use on his own lawn. John sees Mrs. Elkins using the edger she had just bought. Thinking it is his and that she had stolen it from him, he takes it back when she leaves to answer the phone. Alice tells Mrs. Elkins she saw John using an edger. Meanwhile, a delivery man leaves a lamp for Mrs. Elkins with Eloise because she is not home. Mrs. Elkins brings Sgt. Mooney to John's house. John sees Mr. Duncan's store name on the edger and apologizes for the mix-up. Mooney and Mrs. Elkins then find her lamp in John's house. Sgt. Mooney thinks John is a kleptomaniac and takes him to the police station. The boys see this and decide to save John from the bad Sheriff. Mooney speaks with Eloise and apologizes to John for the misunderstanding and lets him go. But because of something the boys did, there is another mix-up and Mooney arrests John again.
137	29	"The Three F's"	Charles Barton	Joe Bigelow & Jay Sommers	April 21, 1963
Property taxes have risen, and Mr. Wilson thinks the reason is that the school is wasting money on nonessential programs and luxuries. John has a letter printed in the newspaper with his complaints. Mr. Sparks (Harold Gould), the principal, invites John to spend the day as a regular student. John will be in Dennis' class with teacher Miss Williams. John shows up late to class. He gets sent to the principal's office for criticizing the way Miss Williams teaches history. John comes back to class and sees Dennis doing the Twist with Margaret. Dennis then has John dance with Margaret. The class then works on a math problem and John gets the wrong answer. Dennis tells John where he made his mistake. The class is dismissed for lunch. Seymour is Lunch Monitor and he makes John pick up all the papers in the yard. Dennis comes out to get John. Dennis tells him that Seymour tricked him and Seymour was actually supposed to clean the yard. Next it is time to study the Solar System. John is the Earth and has to revolve around Dennis, who is the Sun. John gets dizzy and falls down. School is over and John is lying down on his couch. Mr. Andrews is at the house reassessing John's property tax. Mr. Sparks comes by and John tells him he will have some more complaints about the school to put in the paper. Thanks to Dennis spotting a mathematical mistake that Mr. Andrews made, John's tax will be lower than it was before. John also has to admit that the school is doing some things right. John gets a F's on his report card. Note: The Three F's is Gould's second guest appearance in the series. He played the hobo in Season 3's "Haunted House."
138	30	"Never Say Dye"	Charles Barton	Phil Leslie & Keith Fowler	April 28, 1963
Famous actress Norma Lamont (Erin O'Brien-Moore) commissions Mr. Wilson to write her life story thinking he is a "young, vigorous author with a youthful point-of-view". John gets a special delivery letter from Norma saying that instead of her mailing the materials for the book, she will bring them in person. she will be there that afternoon. John panics because she will see he's not young. Meanwhile, Dennis and Tommy tell Mr. Krinkie that Norma Lamont is coming to see Mr. Wilson. The boys run into John coming out of a beauty shop with some hair dye. John has another errand so he asks the boys to bring the dye to his house for him. The bottle falls out of the box and breaks on the sidewalk, so the boys replace it with a bottle of Tommy's mother's dye thinking it is the same thing. An unsuspecting Mr. Wilson proceeds to use the dye on his entire head. His hair winds up with a bunch of light colored streaks. John then talks Henry into substituting for him. Miss Lamont arrives and Henry greets her. Henry misunderstands a signal John gives him and says he will write the book for $100. John comes in the room claiming to be Mr. Wilson's lawyer. Dennis accidentally calls him Mr. Wilson, so John says he's a brother. Eloise comes home and is surprised when Henry introduces her as his wife. When Dennis tells Alice that Norma wanted to be alone with Henry, she decides to go to the house pretending to be Mr. Wilson. When Alice tells Norma she is Mrs. Wilson, John has to come into the room and pretend she is his wife. Mr. Krinkie comes by with a photographer. Because of Krinkie, Norma finds out about John's charade. Dennis almost talks Norma into letting John still write the book, but then something happens and she storms out of the house. Anna Lee Carroll as Hair Dresser.
139	31	"The Lost Dog"	Charles Barton	Budd Grossman	May 5, 1963
Dennis, Tommy and Seymour show Mr. Wilson a large dog that they found and named Tiny. They try talking John into keeping the dog, but he wants nothing to do with it. Henry allows the dog to stay in their house for the night. Tiny causes nothing but trouble including barking and jumping on Henry's bed. The next morning Tiny takes John's paper and then chases him up a tree. John reads in the paper that there is a $100 reward for a large shaggy lost dog named Clyde. John gets the dog from the Mitchells, telling them that he will take care of it. Mrs. Morton (Ruth Gillette) comes to the Wilson house to claim her Clyde. It turns out not to be the lost dog and John is now stuck with it. Eloise is upset when John takes to dog to the other side of town and leaves it there. It is not long and Tiny comes back to John's house. Mrs. Elkins comes by with Sgt. Mooney to complain that Tiny chased her cat up a tree. Mooney gives John a ticket for not having a license for the dog. That night, Eloise cannot believe that John took Tiny to the next town and left him. Tiny finds his way back and starts barking in front of John's house. People call John to complain and he has to let the dog in the house. The next morning, Tiny brings all the neighbors papers to John. Mooney tells John that if he does not return all the papers, he will take John and the dog to the station. John and Henry decide to take Tiny to the pound. After seeing John's ad in the paper, the woman (Adrienne Marden) who owns the dog comes by. The woman was told by Eloise to give the $25 reward to Dennis.
140	32	"Tuxedo Trouble"	Charles Barton	Phil Leslie & Keith Fowler	May 12, 1963
John is writing a speech that he is to give at a Civic Improvement League meeting that night. Dennis and his friends want to start a laundry service using Mrs. Elkins' old washing machine. Eloise finds a stain on John's tuxedo. Because Eloise also has other places to go, Dennis offers to take Mr. Wilson's tuxedo to the cleaners. Dennis decides to remove the stain on the tuxedo to save John some money. He and Tommy go to get some cleaning fluid. While Dennis is away, Seymour throws the tuxedo in the washing machine with other children's dirty laundry. To cover himself, Dennis decides to give Mr. Wilson Henry's tuxedo to use. John sends the tuxedo to the tailor to have it altered. But it turns out that Henry will need his tuxedo that night as he is now going to the meeting. Dennis waits by John's house for the tailor to drop off the tuxedo. He runs it over to his house to put in Henry's closet. Dennis then gives John Seymour's father's tuxedo. It is way too big and John calls the tailor again. Henry tries on the tux and it is too big on him. He decides that he will not go to the meeting. Dennis and Tommy then take that tux back to John. Alice talks Henry into going and says she can fix his tux. Dennis now puts Seymour's father's tux in Henry's closet. More tuxedo switching takes place and Dennis finally explains what happened to John and Henry. John rents a tuxedo, but then another problem occurs.
141	33	"Hawaiian Love Song"	Charles Barton	Joe Bigelow & Jay Sommers	May 19, 1963
Eloise has been making subtle hints about their anniversary. Eloise gets angry with John because she thinks he is not taking her to Hawaii for their anniversary even though he promised to. Meanwhile, Alice asks Henry what he is going to do with his bonus and he says it is a secret. Henry tells Dennis that he is going to buy a new car. John tells Dennis that he really is taking Eloise to Hawaii and he takes Dennis with to buy the tickets. Dennis suggests sending the tickets to his house so Eloise does not find them. After Alice gets the letter, she calls the travel agent and learns they are tickets to Hawaii. She thinks that is what Henry did with the bonus money. Dennis tells John that Alice knows about the tickets. Eloise tells John that Alice just called saying she is going to Hawaii. John convinces Henry to not tell Alice the truth and spoil his surprise for Eloise. Alice says that her mother will watch Dennis. Even though it ruins John's surprise, both Alice and Eloise learn the truth. Henry decides to take Alice to Hawaii. What they later learn is that Alice's mother called and Dennis told her that his parents were not going, so she made other plans. At the airport, Eloise feels bad for Alice and asks John to postpone their trip. John turns in his tickets. Alice, Henry and Dennis show up and Henry tells the Wilsons that the whole family is going to Hawaii. John tries to get his tickets back and finds out that they were sold to Henry. Everyone decides to stay home and they have a Hawaiian themed party.
142	34	"The Lucky Rabbit's Foot"	Charles Barton	Jay Sommers	May 26, 1963
John complains to Eloise about the bad luck he has been having for the past month. Dennis has what he thinks is a lucky rabbit's foot and he offers to let John borrow it. John, however, does not believe in such superstition and does not take the foot. Right in front of John, Dennis finds a ten dollar bill. John's bad luck continues. Henry tells John that he presented a plan to his boss and he might win a prize because of it. Henry and John discover that Dennis had placed his rabbit foot in Henry's jacket. John cons Dennis into letting him keep the rabbit's foot for a while. Dennis runs into Mr. Gordon, the milkman, who claims to have lost $10. Dennis returns the bill to him. John runs into some good luck and Dennis has some bad luck. Dennis would like his rabbit's foot back. Henry takes the foot away from Dennis and then gets some good news from his boss. John buys his own rabbits foot but it does not help him. Dennis agrees to switch his foot with John's. Henry takes John's foot with to see his boss and still has good luck. John's luck does not get better with Dennis' foot. Dennis now has a four leafed clover.
143	35	"Listen to the Mockingbird"	Charles Barton	Phil Leslie & Keith Fowler	June 2, 1963
The first mockingbird of spring has made its nest in Mr. Wilson's backyard. John believes this will help in his run for president of the Birdwatchers Society. Mr. Timberlake (Maurice Manson) is retiring as president. Mr. Timberlake comes by to see the bird. Mrs. Elkins, who is also running for president, stops by. The next morning, John tells Henry that the mockingbird's chirping kept him up all night. That night, John has the same problem with the bird. John is about to set off fireworks to scare the bird away when Dennis and Tommy come by with some worms. Later, John thinks he has frightened the bird away, but then the chirping starts again. The next morning, Mrs. Elkins and Mrs. Dudley ask John if they can record the bird's chirping. John reluctantly agrees. Dennis and Tommy drop by, and while the ladies are putting the microphone in the tree, Tommy turns on the recorder. When Mrs. Elkins finds out that John has removed the mockingbird's nest, she believes she has the upper hand. John now has to confess to Mr. Timberlake what he did. But, thanks to Dennis and the recorder, John comes up with some incriminating evidence against Mrs. Elkins. Mrs. Elkins is forced to resign from the club and Timberlake will endorse John for the presidency. Dennis and Tommy build a bird house for John and it is now filled with chirping mockingbirds. Note: Listen to the Mockingbird marks the final appearance in the series of Irene Tedrow, who played Lucy Elkins.
144	36	"First Editions"	Charles Barton	Jay Sommers	June 9, 1963
Mr. Wilson wants to buy an expensive new camera. Eloise gives John a hard time about all of his other hobbies that he lost interest in. Henry tells Dennis to get rid of his massive comic book collection, so he decides to sell them. John decides to sell his first-edition books to raise the needed funds for the camera. Dennis shows some of his comic books to John to have him see if there are any first editions. John gets a call from a Mr. Dewey (Ronald Long) about his books and is offered more than John had wanted. John writes Mr. Dewey's phone number on one of the comic books. Dennis gathers up his comics, including the one with the phone number on it. John goes around buying the comics that Dennis has sold looking for the one with the phone number. Soon kids are lined up at the Wilson house selling their comics. John now has a room full of comics and he gives them to Dennis. It turns out that Dennis had the one with the phone number and John goes to call Mr. Dewey. Just then, Mr. Dewey shows up and says he now cannot buy the books because he purchased the very camera John wanted. Mr. Dewey then trades the camera for John's books and Dennis' comic books. This means John has to share the camera with Dennis.
145	37	"A Man Among Men"	Charles Barton	Phil Leslie & Keith Fowler	June 16, 1963
Henry has to go on a business trip, and he tells Dennis he has to be the man of the house. Meanwhile, Mr. Wilson has had a book of articles he has written published. He brings over copies for Alice and Dennis. John tells them that he plans to give the profits to the Red Cross. John goes to see Alvin Jessup (Grady Sutton), the owner of the local bookstore, hoping to get a large window display for his book. Alvin agrees to put John's book in his window, but they have a disagreement over the size of the display. Alvin starts to feel that John is being greedy and decides to send all of John's books back to the publisher. While painting his fence, John tells Dennis that Mr. Jessup will not put his book in the store window. Dennis offers to help paint and makes a mess of things. The next day, Dennis and some of his friends picket in front of the book store saying Jessup is being unfair to John. Alvin gets his friends to leave but Dennis continues to picket. John comes by and takes the picket sign from Dennis. Sgt. Mooney thinks John is picketing and fines him. Dennis talks to Mr. Jessup and convinces him to sell John's books. John thanks Dennis for what he did and says that he acted the way a real man should.
146	38	"Aunt Emma Visits the Wilsons"	Charles Barton	Budd Grossman	July 7, 1963
In the series finale, Mr. Wilson's Aunt Emma is coming for a visit. Worried that Eloise will be destitute if he should pass away suddenly, John hopes that Aunt Emma will leave her money to him. But there is a chance that she will leave the money to various charities. Aunt Emma arrives and meets Dennis and takes an instant liking to him. She referees Dennis and his friends playing basketball. John starts to fear that she will make Dennis her heir instead of him. John becomes more and more worried as Aunt Emma and Dennis spend more and more time together. Aunt Emma mentions contacting her lawyer about Dennis. At home, Dennis tells his parents that he would like to give Aunt Emma a going away present. He gives her his cherished bug collection and Aunt Emma says it is one of the nicest gifts she has ever received. In the end, Aunt Emma leaves a pirate sword to Dennis and all her money to Eloise. Note: Verna Felton plays Aunt Emma. Coincidentally, she was the mother of Lee Millar, who played Tommy's father, Mr. Anderson, in Season 1's "Dennis' Tree House" and Season 3's "Dennis and the Pee Wee League."
