= List of Our Miss Brooks episodes =

List of episodes titles and details of the American TV sitcom Our Miss Brooks

Our Miss Brooks is an American sitcom starring Eve Arden as school teacher Connie Brooks, also starring is Gale Gordon, Robert Rockwell, Jane Morgan, Richard Crenna, & Gloria McMillan. The sitcom ran Fridays from October 3. 1952 to May 11, 1956, 130 episodes were made during its run.

== Series overview ==
Season	Episodes	Originally released		Rank	Rating	Households (millions)
Season	Episodes	First released	Last released	Rank	Rating	Households (millions)
1	38	October 3, 1952	June 26, 1953	22	35.0 (Note: Tied with The Big Story)	7.14
2	31	October 2, 1953	June 18, 1954	14	34.2	8.89
3	30	October 1, 1954	June 3, 1955	—N/a	—N/a	—N/a
4	31	October 7, 1955	May 11, 1956	—N/a	—N/a	—N/a

== Episodes ==
=== Season 1 (1952-53) ===
No. overall	No. in season	Title	Directed by	Written by	Original release date
1	1	"Trying to Pick a Fight"	Al Lewis	Al Lewis & Joseph Quillan	October 3, 1952
Miss Connie Brooks (Eve Arden) tells her landlady Mrs. Margaret Davis (Jane Morgan) about her 4 year relationship with Philip Boynton (Robert Rockwell). It's not progressing the way Connie would like. Young student Walter Denton (Richard Crenna) comes by to drive Connie to school where she teaches. Walter explains that picking fights with his girlfriend Harriet Conklin (Gloria McMillan) helps the relationship. It's the making up that makes it worth it. Connie decides to try it with Philip. At school, Principal Osgood Conklin (Gale Gordon) asks Connie to keep Walter away from his daughter. Connie mentions Walter's theory about picking fights. At the school cafeteria, Connie tries to pick a fight with Philip but she doesn't get anywhere. Osgood tells Connie that he tried her picking a fight suggestion with his wife Martha and she left him. He leaves the school to try and find her. Connie answers the phone in Osgood's office and it's Martha. Martha says that she's at the store having her valise repaired. Connie tells her about the picking a fight theory and that Osgood thinks she left him. Philip overhears what Connie is saying. This leads to an argument between the two. That evening, Connie and Philip are at the Conklin home and Osgood still isn't back. It turns out that Osgood borrowed Walter's car to look for Martha. Walter comes by and says he reported his car stolen hoping the police will find Osgood. A policeman brings Osgood home.
2	2	"The Loaded Custodian"	Al Lewis	Al Lewis & Joseph Quillan	October 10, 1952
Connie tells Mrs. Davis that Principal Conklin is having her do an inventory at school. She has to itemize everything that is missing. Today she has to check the office of the school custodian, Mr. Burwell (Cliff Arquette). While waiting in Burwell's office, Walter tells Connie that the previous janitor, Mr. Jensen, was quite a hoarder. Supposedly, Jensen stashed a fortune somewhere and no one knows where. Mr. Burwell shows up and tells Connie he would like to have his broken window repaired, but Conklin said no. Connie goes to see Conklin with the list of things needing replacing. He refuses to order any of the items. Mr. Burwell tells Connie and Conklin that Mr. Jensen has passed away. Burwell also says that some of the money Jensen stashed away was found. Harriet Conklin mentions that maybe Jensen left some money in the custodian's office. Walter, Connie and Philip each go to Burwell's office hoping to find the money. It's not long before Conklin shows up and then Harriet. Harriet tells them that she saw Mr. Jensen, very much alive, walking passed the school. Turns out that Mr. Burwell was in the closet taking pictures of each of them rummaging through the office. He made up the stories about the hidden money being found. He blackmails Connie and Philip into getting some new things for his office. And he gets Conklin to make some repairs in his office and get some of the things that Connie and Philip wanted for the school.
3	3	"The Embezzled Dress"	Al Lewis	Al Lewis & Joseph Quillan	October 17, 1952
Miss Brooks tells Mrs. Davis that she has been put in charge of a $25 student fund and she left the money on her dresser. Mrs. Davis doesn't really hear what Connie is saying because she's running an orange juice squeezer machine. Mrs. Davis surprises Connie with a new dress that she bought with money she found on Connie's dresser. Connie can't take the dress back because Mrs. Davis says it was a close out sale and there are no refunds. Walter comes by and tells Connie about a woman who was sent to jail for embezzling money. Connie asks Home Economics teacher Miss Atterberry (Kathleen Freeman) if she'd be interested in buying the dress. When Connie puts a tear in her dress, she has to wear the new one for a meeting with Conklin. Conklin is giving Connie until lunch period to give him the student bank records. Miss Atterberry tries on the new dress and it doesn't fit, so she won't buy it. Philip tells Connie that he's selling a raccoon coat to Conklin so he can wear it to a masquerade ball. Philip is going to the ball as well and Connie suggests that he wear the new dress. When Philip says he doesn't want to buy the dress, Harriet Conklin thinks her mother might like the dress. Conklin tells Connie he won't be able to go over the bank records until after school. At the Conlkin house, Osgood finds there's $25 missing in the student bank records. After a little confusion, Connie gets the money for the new dress from Mrs. Conklin and then gives it to Osgood.
4	4	"The Birthday Bag"	Al Lewis	Al Lewis & Joseph Quillan	October 24, 1952
Connie tells Mrs. Davis that there is an expensive green alligator handbag that she wants to buy. Walter comes by to drive Connie to school. While Connie goes to get ready, Walter and Mrs. Davis discuss the surprise birthday party that they're throwing for Connie. Mrs. Davis says that they should get Connie the handbag as a present. Mrs. Davis suggests that all of Connie's friends borrow money from her so that she is broke and can't buy the bag herself. On the ride to school, Walter comes up with an elaborate story and borrows some money from Connie. Harriet and then Osgood Conklin borrow money from her. After Philip borrows money from her, Connie says she will go to a bank to get the money she needs for the handbag. Philip tells Conklin, Harriet and Walter about Connie's plan. Walter suggests that they call the department store and tell them to not sell the handbag to Connie. The group then make plans to get Connie to the Conklin house for her party. Harriet buys the handbag before Connie gets to the store. Connie goes to the Conklin house hoping to talk Harriet into trading handbags. Everyone is surprised because Connie wasn't supposed to be there yet. Osgood informs Connie that everyone is there because of her birthday. They give her the handbag and return the money they borrowed from her.
5	5	"The Wrong Mrs. Boynton"	Al Lewis	Al Lewis & Joseph Quillan	October 31, 1952
Connie tells Mrs. Davis that Philip took her to the zoo last night. She also mentions that Philip is in line for a professorship at State University. Dean Faraday will interview him later that day. Connie learns that the Dean prefers his teachers to be family men. Philip told a "white lie" and said he lives with Mrs. Boynton, meaning his mother. Philip tells Connie that he has a problem as the Dean called again saying he wants to meet Mrs. Boynton. Connie thinks that when Philip says Mrs. Boynton that he means his wife and she volunteers to fill in. Harriet is eavesdropping on the conversation and then tells her father that Philip called Connie Mrs. Boynton. Conklin now believes that Philip and Connie are going to get married. He is afraid that Connie will quit her job to raise a family. Later, Connie entertains the Dean in Philip's apartment while waiting for Philip to arrive. They have a slightly confusing conversation because the Dean thinks Connie is Philip's mother and Connie speaks as though she only met Philip a few years ago. Philip shows up and the conversation continues to be confusing. Philip takes Connie into another room and explains that she is supposed to be his mother. Conklin shows up hoping to stop Philip and Connie from getting married. Figuring out that Philip has been trying to deceive him, the Dean tells him they'll find someone else to fill the position.
6	6	"Living Statues"	Al Lewis	Al Lewis & Joseph Quillan	November 7, 1952
Connie tells Mrs. Davis that she broke Osgood Conklin's glasses yesterday. Walter tells Connie about a quick drying transparent paint he invented in the chemistry lab that's going to make him rich. At school, Connie breaks Conklin's new set of glasses. Conklin wants Connie to repair the scratches and marks on the walls in his office by that afternoon. During lunch, Philip mentions to Connie that Walter painted his living room the night before. Philip says that the paint also fills in cracks and scratches. Connie now wants Walter to paint Osgood's office. Walter tells Harriet that he added an ingredient to his paint. He's not sure what it was, but it improved the consistency of the paint. Harriet finds out that the ingredient is liquid cement. Later, Walter, Philip and Connie are painting Conklin's office. Walter and Philip become stuck to parts of the office. Connie's hand gets stuck to her face and she's stuck to a chair. Conklin comes in and would like the three to leave as school board member Mr. Stone (Paul Harvey) is coming by. Conklin's hand becomes stuck to his desk. Mr. Stone arrives and his hand gets stuck to a phone handset. An angry Mr. Stone pulls the handset from the cord and leaves. Philip is able to free his hand from the wall and goes to the chemistry lab to mix up a dissolvent.
7	7	"Madison Country Club"	Al Lewis	Al Lewis & Joseph Quillan	November 14, 1952
Connie tells Mrs. Davis that another school raised money to refurnish the principal's office. Conklin wants the same for his office. Mrs. Davis says she was playing bridge at the Conklin's. A Mrs. Smith, who was there, commented on how well the faculty at the other school dresses. Mrs. Smith tells Conklin how poorly dressed his teachers are. Conklin agrees with her and invited her to the school to see first hand. The cat swallowed the key to Connie's wardrobe closet, so she has to wear one of Mrs. Davis' dresses to school. At school, Conklin tells Connie that his collection box to refurnish his office yielded very little. Conklin is angling for a donation from wealthy Mrs. Graybar (Isabel Randolph), because she donated to the other school. Mrs. Graybar agrees to come by the school, but she wishes to remain anonymous and be called Mrs. Smith. Conklin tells Connie that he wants her and some others to meet Mrs. Smith after school. Connie thinks he's referring to the Mrs. Smith that said the teachers at Madison dressed poorly. Connie, Mr. Boynton and Walter decide to show Mrs. Smith and dress very well for their meeting. Meanwhile, Conklin is trying to make his office look very shabby. Mrs. Graybar arrives at Conklin's office and feels sorry for how poor he looks. Connie comes in outrageously dressed and tells her about all the parties Conklin throws. Mrs. Graybar rips up the check she had written out. Philip and Walter show up fancily dressed. The three feel bad when they find out the woman is really Mrs. Graybar, who has stormed out of the office.
8	8	"Mr. Whipple"	Al Lewis	Al Lewis & Joseph Quillan	November 21, 1952
Mrs. Davis tells Connie that she'll be filling in as a nurse for Dr. Bond. Connie mentions that her and Philip will be going to the faculty dance that evening. Mrs. Davis then says that she will be going to a Mr. Whipple's (Thurston Hall) house to give him a vitamin shot. He apparently hasn't eaten in 10 days and is suffering from malnutrition. Connie recalls a boy she went to school with named Whipple. He was voted most likely to succeed. Walter comes by to pick up Connie and she tells him about poor Mr. Whipple. Mr. Bennet (Parley Baer), Mr. Whipple's secretary, calls Mrs. Davis. He tells her they'll have to postpone the vitamin shot until later in the day as he has an important business conference. Bennet tells her Whipple is a millionaire many times over. Whipple hasn't eaten in 10 days because he's on a liquid diet. Conklin tells Connie that he'll be going to a meeting with the board and a Government consultant about getting a larger gym for the school. Somehow word spreads about poor Mr. Whipple to where Conklin and then Philip hear about him. Mrs. Davis has given Mr. Whipple his shot and he mentions how he recommended that the school keep the gym it has. Mrs. Davis finds Mr. Whipple to be quite the miser. Connie goes to Whipple's house and brings him a basket full of food. Because people always want something from him, Whipple pretends to be Bennet. He tells Connie that Whipple is his gardener. Conklin, Walter and Philip show up bringing gifts. They all reprimand "Bennet" for treating Whipple so badly. Mrs. Davis comes in and lets it slip that they are talking to Mr. Whipple. Whipple tells Conlkin and Connie that he'll hire a large band for the dance that evening. And he'll see to it that the school gets a new gym.
9	9	"The Big Game"	Al Lewis	Al Lewis & Joseph Quillan	November 28, 1952
Connie tells Mrs. Davis over breakfast that her and Mr. Boynton have been made honorary cheerleaders for the big football game that day. Connie mentions how Madison High and Clay High are bitter rivals. Walter comes by and tells Mrs. Davis that her and the new assistant coach, Gus 'Snakehips' Geary (Burt Mustin), would make a cute couple. At school, Philip tells Connie that Snakehips was hired for sentimental reasons. He was the star quarterback at Madison back in the day. Snakehips comes by and talks about his life after football and how nice it is to be back at Madison. Conklin calls Connie to his office and wants her to tell Snakehips that he's fired. Turns out that all Madison employees must have a high school diploma and Snakehips never got his. The principal of Clay High tipped off the school board about Snakehips. Both Conklin and Connie realize how important Snakehips is for the morale of the football team. Because he flunked English, Conklin wants Connie to work with him and get his diploma by game time. After Connie runs over things with Snakehips, Harriet gives him a practice test. He doesn't do well on the test. Conklin hints to Connie that she should be very lenient in grading Snakehips actual test. When Connie isn't around, Philip and Walter look at Snakehips test score and see that he flunked. Connie tells Conklin, Philip and Snakehips that Snakehips passed the test. Conklin and Snakehips leave and Philip tells Connie he knows she's lying. Connie finds a way to justify what she did.
10	10	"Blue Goldfish"	Al Lewis	Al Lewis & Joseph Quillan	December 5, 1952
Walter is driving Connie to school and gives her a lot of compliments. Connie knows he wants something. As manager of the basketball team, Walter would like Connie to ask Conklin for more uniforms. Walter also complains about how cold it is in the gym. Connie says her classroom is cold as well. At school, Harriet tells Connie about how cold her Home Economics classroom is. Harriet also mentions how the class could use a new sewing machine. Harriet would like Connie to talk to her father about it. Mr. Boynton's Biology Lab is also cold and he tells Connie about some new equipment he could use. Connie speaks to Conklin about the cold and getting the school board to appropriate money for the other items needed. Conklin refuses to consider any of her requests. Connie decides everyone should pretend to be sick to shame him. Philip goes to Conklin's office and starts sneezing. He leaves and then it's Walter who comes in sneezing. Conklin figures out that the two were just faking and he knows Connie is behind it. Connie comes in pretending to be sick. Thanks to Harriet, Connie and Walter find out that Conklin has been sitting on a heating pad.
11	11	"The Stolen Aerial"	Al Lewis	Al Lewis & Joseph Quillan	December 12, 1952
Mrs. Davis would like Connie to drop off their TV antenna to repairman Mr. Felix Seymour (Hy Averback). It was damaged in a storm. Connie has reservations about going to Mr. Seymour as he's always flirting with her. At the repair shop, Felix asks Connie out, but she turns him down. Felix will fix her antenna for free, she just can't tell anyone. He also mentions how thieves have been stealing antennas lately. Felix lends Connie an antenna until hers can be repaired. Meanwhile, Conklin tells Harriet that their antenna was stolen, but he has the serial number. Connie comes into Conklin's office with the antenna and Conklin thinks it looks like his. Walter and Philip bring Connie their antennas hoping she can get Felix to fix them at a discount. More and more people bring Connie their antennas. Walter tells Connie that a friend of his would like her to have their TV set fixed at a discount by Felix. He will leave it in Conklin's office. Harriet finds her father's office filled with TVs. Conklin tells her that he checked the antenna that Connie had with her and it had his serial number. Conklin thinks Connie is the antenna thief and that Walter and Philip are in on it. With Walter's help, Connie gets all the antennas and TVs to her house. Philip comes by the house. He tells them that he learned from Harriet that Conklin intends to take the three of them to the police station. Philip also says that Conklin knows that the antenna that Connie had was his. Connie now thinks that Felix is dealing in stolen goods. Conklin comes by with a shot gun and calls the police. Harriet comes by with a perfectly reasonable explanation for how Connie got his antenna. Neither Connie nor Felix are crooks.
12	12	"The Hobby Show"	Al Lewis	Al Lewis & Joseph Quillan	December 19, 1952
Connie has been preparing questions for an English test that is coming up. Mrs. Davis thinks that Connie has been working too hard and is concerned about Connie's health. Connie mentions that she drove Mrs. Davis' car into a hotel lobby and it's in the shop. While driving her to school, Walter tells Connie that she doesn't seem as vibrant as she usually is. At school, Harriet also tells Connie she seems to be working too hard. Conklin tells Connie that she needs to get a hobby so she can find time to relax. She needs to enjoy life more. At lunch, Walter asks Connie how she feels about model trains. Connie tells Mr. Boynton that she needs to work on the questions for her test. Philip says how relaxing playing chess can be. After school, Mrs. Davis wants to teach Connie how to knit because it's good for the nerves. Connie goes into the living room and there is Walter with a train set, Harriet with her finger paints and Philip with a chess set. They tell Connie it's time for a hobby afternoon. The Conklin's then stop by. Martha Conklin brought toys to fix for the underprivileged children. Osgood brought a carpentry set. Everyone wants Connie to try what they brought and it's driving her crazy.
13	13	"Christmas Show"	Al Lewis	Al Lewis & Joseph Quillan	December 27, 1952
Martha Conklin was going to lend Connie some money so she could by Christmas presents. But then she learned what Osgood was giving her and she has to buy him a better present than what she had planned to get. Martha also drops off Mr. Boynton's present for Connie. After Martha leaves, Connie opens the present because she needs to know how much she has to spend on Philip. Connie goes to see Mrs. Carney (Florence Bates) at the gift exchange office. Mrs. Carney is a bit surly. Connie wants to exchange the perfume that Philip gave her so she can buy him a pipe. Connie meets Philip at school and says that she hopes Conklin didn't buy her anything as she doesn't have the money to get him a gift. Conklin comes in with gifts. He gives Philip the same pipe that Connie bought and gives Connie the same perfume that Philip gave her. Conklin mentions that he'll be going away later that day, so they should give him their presents before he leaves. Connie goes to see Mrs. Carney again. At home, Walter comes by and hints to Connie what gift he would like. He gives her his present. Philip goes to see Mrs. Carney and then Connie comes by once again. Conklin comes to exchange gifts. At Connie's house, Philip and the Conklin's arrive for the Christmas party. Mrs. Carney comes by. She's a friend of Martha's. Mrs. Carney complains to Mrs. Davis about the people that exchanged gifts all day. Connie, Philip and Conklin take turns hiding under a Santa beard when they see Mrs. Carney.
14	14	"Aunt Mattie Boynton"	Al Lewis	Al Lewis & Joseph Quillan	January 2, 1953
Connie complains to Conklin about all the extra typing he's making her do. Conklin mentions that Miss Daisy Enright (Mary Jane Croft) is being considered for the head of the English Department. Connie tells Mr. Boynton that if Miss Enright is made head of the English Department, she might resign. Connie complains about a slight headache and Philip rubs her neck. Miss Enright comes in and Connie is clearly not happy to see her. Philip tells the two about his Aunt Mattie. She was a teacher who taught 5 subjects and then went home and took care of her husband and nine children. Philip says that if he could find someone as industrious as her, he'd marry her right away. Conklin wants to create a course in business administration but can't find a teacher. Connie and Daisy both volunteer to take on the extra work. Daisy says that she has past experience in that field. Conklin wants to know if she has knowledge about getting cheaper fuel oil for his home furnace. Walter thinks he can get some fuel oil at wholesale which would help Connie get the business job. Meanwhile, Conklin shows Harriet the furnace he had newly converted to forced air. Connie wants to surprise Conklin, so she and Walter put the oil in the furnace. Miss Enright is at the Conklin house to discuss the business class. Connie comes to Osgood's front door and is about to tell him about her oil deal. He goes to the other room where Daisy is. Harriet tells Connie about the converted furnace. Connie now needs Walter to siphon all the oil out of the furnace before Conklin turns it on. Conklin does turn the furnace on and gets sprayed with oil coming through the vents. Everyone else gets sprayed as well.
15	15	"The Pet Shop"	Al Lewis	Al Lewis & Joseph Quillan	January 9, 1953
Mrs. Davis lets it slip to Walter that Mr. Boynton stood up Connie the day before. Connie over hears this and then tells Walter that the two were to meet in front of a pet shop, but Philip never showed up. Walter tells her that a lot of the kids don't understand how she could be so interested in such a shy guy. Walter says that to get back at Mr. Boynton, she should act as though she wasn't waiting at the pet shop at all. Walter and Connie rehearse what she'll say to Philip and Mrs. Davis thinks the two are really talking to each other. Connie goes to see Philip in the Biology lab. She starts talking about missed dates and Philip remembers that he was supposed to have a lunch date with Professor Schmidt the day before. Philip hopes that Schmidt will accept his apology. When Connie asks him what he did after school yesterday, he says he sat around at home and then took a nap. Before Connie can tell him off, Harriet walks in. Connie storms out of the lab. Philip tells Harriet that he hopes Connie calms down as he has a date with her later. He has it written down in his appointment book to meet her at the pet shop. At lunch, Walter tells Connie to make a date with Mr. Boynton for later that day and then not show up. Connie confirms a date to meet at the pet shop with Philip. Later, Philip overhears Connie and Walter talking about how she's not showing up for the date. Connie has a change of heart and decides to go to the pet shop. Philip does show up and Connie learns that she had the dates mixed up.
16	16	"The Hurricane"	Al Lewis	Al Lewis & Joseph Quillan	January 16, 1953
It's raining outside. Walter comes by to pick up Connie and shows her a short wave radio that he's building. At school, Conklin tells Connie that he'll be leaving once his wife calls as he's having new furniture delivered to the house. Connie then drops off Walter's radio at Mr. Boynton's Biology lab. Harriet comes in and tells Connie that her father went home and he wants Connie to be acting principal. Philip leaves the lab and Harriet plugs in Walters radio. They hear a weather bulletin announcing a hurricane is on the way. The bulletin recommends that schools be closed. After the two leave the lab, the bulletin signs off from Bombay, India. Connie sends Walter to tell the teachers to dismiss their classes. Connie, Philip, Walter and Harriet then head to the Conklin house. Conklin is furious that Connie shut down the school and he doesn't believe a hurricane could get that far inland. Walter plugs in his radio and another bulletin about the hurricane is announced. The bulletin recommends boarding up windows with bamboo. Conklin's new furniture just happens to be bamboo. He watches as the others break up his furniture. Everyone then hears the bulletin sign off from Bombay.
17	17	"Monsieur La Blanche"	Al Lewis	Al Lewis & Joseph Quillan	January 30, 1953
Mrs. Davis shows Connie an article in the school paper about Mr. Boynton attending a biologists convention upstate. He borrowed money from Connie to go and he'll be gone several weeks. Connie mentions that French teacher Maurice La Blanche (Maurice Marsac) asked her out but she turned him down. Mrs. Davis is surprised as Maurice is so charming. But because he's been so attentive, Connie might give him another chance. Walter comes by and he's noticed how Maurice acts around Connie. At school, Maurice gives Connie some flowers, and believing that she understands the language, he wrote her a note in French. She pretends to read it and will give him an answer at lunch. Connie tells Walter she wants Harriet to translate the note. Walter says he can translate it and claims it says that Maurice is fond of Connie and would like a date. Connie leaves and Harriet comes by. She reads the note and it says that Maurice would like to borrow $50 from Connie to buy a car from Conklin. Connie and Maurice meet for lunch and she agrees to the question in his note, thinking it's for a date. That night, Conklin shows up to Connie's place and then Maurice. Connie finally learns that Maurice was asking her for money and she tells him she doesn't have it. Before they can tell Conklin the deal is off, he gets a call about the car. Walter disguises his voice and tells Conklin he'll pay $150 for the car. Things get confusing between three, but Maurice decides he doesn't want the car. Philip comes home early and tells Connie that with some of his money and the money he borrowed from her, he bought Conklin's car.
18	18	"Old Marblehead"	Al Lewis	Al Lewis & Joseph Quillan	February 6, 1953
Connie tells Mrs. Davis that Conklin has started fining faculty and students for minor infractions. The funds will be used to buy a bust of himself for the school library. Connie says that Conklin makes up the infractions as he goes along. Connie tells Conklin that many of the students are getting tired of his "Carelessness Code". Because of all the fines, Connie is broke and can't afford lunch. She sits with Harriet and takes a little of hers. Connie borrows a quarter from Mr. Boynton to get a sandwich, but has to give it to Conklin for another fine. After school, Connie has to help Walter straighten out a mess he made in the library. Conklin comes by and tells Connie that his bust will be delivered the next day. There is only one pedestal in the library and there's a bust of Caesar on it. Conklin pretends to accidentally knock it off so he can put his bust there. Philip brings the bust of Conklin in the library early because they want to surprise Conklin. Connie decides to hide it in the bag that the broken Caesar was in. Connie and Philip leave to take Caesar to get fixed. Conklin comes in wanting to break up Caesar more with a large hammer. He starts hitting the bag and Connie comes in. She tells him that he's destroying his own bust.
19	19	"The Model Teacher"	Al Lewis	Al Lewis & Joseph Quillan	February 13, 1953
Mrs. Davis wakes Connie up and tells her that Snap magazine is looking for the ideal teacher. Mrs. Davis says she was going to recommend her but forgot to mail the letter. But someone else did recommend her and a photographer is here to take pictures. Stephanie Forest comes in the room and starts taking pictures of Connie in bed. Connie and Stephanie clearly do not get along. Walter comes by and Stephanie starts flirting with him. Despite having already asked Harriet, Walter asks Stephanie to go to a dance with him after school. At school, Harriet meets Stephanie and is not happy about the way Walter fawns over her. Hoping to get rid of her, Connie tells Conklin about Stephanie taking pictures at the school and at first he disapproves. But when he meets beautiful Stephanie he changes his mind. Stephanie meets Mr. Boynton and spends some time with him in the Biology Lab. Walter, Philip and Conklin continue to fawn over Stephanie. Connie tells Harriet that she regrets sending the telegram to Snap magazine recommending herself. Connie manages to steal the unflattering pictures Stephanie took of her. Connie also finds a way to get rid of Stephanie.
20	20	"Wake-Up Plan"	Al Lewis	Al Lewis & Joseph Quillan	February 20, 1953
Mrs. Davis reads an article in the schools newspaper to Connie. It's about Conklin's new "wake up" plan. All teachers must be in the school gym one half hour before their first class to exercise. The only one that's been late is Connie. Harriet calls Connie and warns her that at the next exercise class, her father will be there running it to catch any laggards. Connie has a headache and Mrs. Davis gives her what she thinks is aspirin. But then she remembers that she had put sleeping pills in that aspirin bottle. The next morning, Conklin sends a note to Mr. Stone, the Head of the Board of Education, about Connie. Connie tries to explain to Conklin that she's late because she took sleeping pills. She brought the bottle of pills with her to show him and leaves it in his office. Conklin didn't get much sleep the night before and falls asleep in front of Connie. Just then, Mr. Gleason, from the Board, comes in to find Conklin sleeping. Connie, Walter and Philip are having lunch in the Biology Lab and she tells them about Conklin. Mr. Stone comes in and mentions the note he got from Conklin. Gleason is getting a headache from Conklin's snoring and takes a pill from Connie's bottle. Connie wakes Conklin up and tells him Stone is on the way. Connie goes to delay Stone and Conklin takes a pill from the bottle. Stone comes in and finds Gleason and Conklin asleep. Connie finds a way to get Conklin and Gleason out of trouble and also gets the exercise program cancelled.
21	21	"The Cafeteria Strike"	Al Lewis	Al Lewis & Joseph Quillan	February 27, 1953
Harriet tells Connie that her father has been getting a lot of letters complaining about the food in the cafeteria. Walter is organizing a group of students to picket outside the cafeteria. Conklin would like Connie to lead a "back to the cafeteria" movement. He also mentions that the last chef was fired for criticizing the equipment. Walter introduces Connie to Mr. Dunbar, who used to teach at Madison. She tells Dunbar how horrible the food is. After Dunbar leaves, Walter tells Connie that he's an editor for a local newspaper. Dunbar tells Conklin what Connie said and that she's the head of the strike committee. Dunbar will also sample the food later in the day. Conklin tells Connie that the current chef, who is so bad, is his brother-in-law. If his brother-in-law loses his job, Conklin will fire Connie. Connie and Conklin sample a meal that Mr. Boynton made in his classroom and it's very good. They plan to pass off Philip as the school chef. Philip is preparing the meal and when he's not around, Walter, Conklin, Mrs. Davis and Connie each add an ingredient that they think will make the dish better. Dunbar loves the meal and will not write anything negative in his paper.
22	22	"Mister Casey's Will"	Al Lewis	Al Lewis & Joseph Quillan	March 6, 1953
Mrs. Davis tells Connie that her sister, Angela Devon (Jesslyn Fax), left all her money to her cat, Mr. Casey, in her will. Angela comes by and tells them that Mr. Casey got into a fight with a dog and didn't survive. She says because they were so kind to the cat, he left Mr. Conklin, Walter and Mr. Boynton something in his will. Angela wants the three to come over for the reading of the will, but she doesn't want them to know Mr. Casey is a cat. Connie makes a bet with Mrs. Davis that the men will admit that they don't know who Casey is and won't accept anything from him. When Connie mentions the will to Walter, he pretends to know who Mr. Casey is. He needs money for new brakes for his car. At school, it seems both Conklin and Philip are short on funds. Connie tells both Conklin and Philip about the will and they also pretend to know Casey. It's time for the reading and the men show up. Walter gets a ball of yarn, Philip gets a tennis ball and Conklin gets a cardboard milk carton.
23	23	"Conklin's Love Nest"	Al Lewis	Al Lewis & Joseph Quillan	March 13, 1953
While driving to school, Walter tells Connie that she is getting nowhere with shy Mr. Boynton and something needs to be done. He thinks that French teacher Maurice La Blanche should talk to Philip and maybe make him jealous. Connie wants Walter to promise to not get involved. Conklin has an apartment above his garage that he wants to rent and asks Connie if she's interested. When Connie says she can't afford it, Conklin asks her to mention it to some of the other teachers. Walter does talk to Maurice and accidentally encourages him to ask Connie to marry him. Maurice does talk to Connie and things get confusing as she thinks he's talking about her and Philip getting together. Maurice thinks Connie accepted his proposal and leaves. Harriet, who overheard the conversation, tells Connie about the proposal. Connie straightens things out with Maurice. Then wanting to get Philip and Connie together, Maurice tells Philip that two can live as cheap as one in Conklin's apartment. Philip is having dinner with Connie and she keeps hinting about the two living together. Mrs. Davis gets involved and the conversation gets very confused. Philip then tells Connie that he and Maurice are renting Conklin's apartment.
24	24	"The Honest Burglar"	Al Lewis	Al Lewis & Joseph Quillan	March 20, 1953
Miss Brooks finds Joe Phillips (Horace McMahon), a vagrant, raiding the refrigerator late at night. He's been out of work for a while, but he promises to repay the people he's taken food from once he gets a job. Connie tells Joe that the custodian at school has been sick and she might be able to get him a job filling in. The next day, Connie goes to talk to Conklin and he mentions that someone broke into his house and stole some food. His wife is visiting relatives and he hasn't had a decent meal since. Connie tells Conklin she has a person to fill the custodian job and brings in Joe. Joe gets the job and after he leaves, Conklin notices his watch is gone from where he placed it on his desk. After Mr. Boynton finds his desk missing, Connie says that some other things in the school are gone as well. Walter tells Connie that all the silverware in the cafeteria is gone. Connie tells him that she suspects Joe. Walter suggests setting a trap for Joe at her home that evening. Connie leaves and Walter tells Joe and Conklin that Connie is having a huge turkey dinner that night. That evening Philip, Walter and Connie catch someone breaking into the kitchen for the turkey and it turns out to be Conklin. Joe comes by and it turns out that there are perfectly reasonable explanations for the missing items at school.
25	25	"Fisher's Pawn Shop"	Al Lewis	Al Lewis & Joseph Quillan	March 27, 1953
Connie tells Mrs. Davis that Madison High's baseball season starts the next day. She says that she got Mr. Boynton to take her to the game. Connie would like a new outfit to wear to the game, but she has no money. Mrs. Davis says there's an outfit at Mr. Fischer's (Frank Nelson) pawn shop. At school, Conklin tells Connie there will be no game and he may have to cancel the whole season. Because Conklin overspent the budget, the team has no uniforms. Philip tells Connie he's disappointed that the game was cancelled. Connie was going to take her outfit to the Home Economics class to be altered. But she leaves it in Philip's Lab while she has lunch. In the cafeteria, Walter tells Connie he had a fight with Harriet and they aren't talking. Walter said some derogatory things about her father for messing up the budget. Conklin comes buy and says he could rent uniforms, but he needs $25. Connie goes to Mr. Fischer's and tries to pawn a bust she took from Conklin's office. Philip comes in trying to pawn Connie's outfit she left in his Lab. Walter comes in trying to pawn Philip's hamster cage. Conklin tries to pawn the baseball trophy. They all learn that the other school has to cancel the game because they have no uniforms.
26	26	"Lulu, the Pin-Up Boat"	Al Lewis	Al Lewis & Joseph Quillan	April 3, 1953
Mrs. Davis reads in the school paper that Conklin has decreed that all teachers and students must wear subdued clothes in honor of Public Schools Week. Walter comes by and tells Connie that Conklin is leaving for his lake cottage that afternoon. It always cheers Conklin up to see his broken down motor boat, Lulu. Walter shows Connie some of his Hollywood pinup photos that he'll put in his gym locker. At school, Harriet tells her father how upset she is having to wear a drab dress. Conklin inspected the gym lockers and found Walter's pictures. He keeps one as evidence and tells Harriet to burn the rest. Plus she is to tell Walter he is to see him at lunch time. Connie comes by the office. Conklin tells her that Mr. Boynton has been coming to school with a lot of pictures. He would like Connie to find out what they are of. Connie has lunch with Philip and it turns out his pictures are of animals. Conklin is looking at the pinup picture and tells Connie the picture is of his boat, Lulu. He tells Connie that Mr. Michaels (Joseph Kearns), the Superintendent of Schools, is coming by to see the pictures he's confiscated. She leaves and Walter comes by. Conklin steps out for a moment and Mr. Michaels stops by. Mr. Michaels finds the pinup picture. Connie comes in and says the picture is of Lulu. What follows is a confusing conversation of Connie describing Conklin and Lulu without mentioning it's a boat. Conklin comes in and things get somewhat straightened out.
27	27	"The Yodar Kritch Award"	Al Lewis	Al Lewis & Joseph Quillan	April 10, 1953
Mrs. Davis and Connie are having breakfast and Connie mentions a test that she's starting to write. Conklin comes by and discusses the upcoming Yodar Kritch Award for Unique Achievement in English. Walter comes by and makes fun of Conklin, not realizing he is standing behind him. Conklin leaves and Walter tells Connie about a party she and Mr. Boynton are invited to that evening. Bones Snodgrass is throwing the party and there could be some chances for romance. During lunch in the cafeteria, Bones tells Connie that there won't be a party. His father said that unless Bones wins the Yodar Kritch Award, there will be no more parties. The only problem is that Bones is not too bright and terrible in English. Harriet and Walter offer to tutor Bones, but he just isn't picking it up. Connie then works with him and makes no progress. In Conklin's office, Connie tells him that Bones is the winner of the award. Everyone is surprised. Connie says that Bones made a unique achievement because he's the only one that didn't answer any of the questions on the test correctly.
28	28	"Madame Brooks DuBarry"	Al Lewis	Al Lewis & Joseph Quillan	April 17, 1953
Connie and Philip attend a Country Club dance but run out of gas in Walter's car on the way home. Connie hopes for a little romance, but Philip just goes to sleep. The next day, Conklin is upset with Harriet because Walter gave her a kiss. Walter tells Conklin that he called Mrs. Davis about his car and learned that Connie never came home. Connie shows up to school still wearing the formal dress from the dance. Conklin asks her where she was all night and then Philip shows up in his tuxedo. Philip tells him what happened, but Conklin doesn't believe the running out of gas story. Maurice La Blanche joins Connie for lunch and tells her he heard what happened from Philip. Maurice says that to get anywhere with Philip, she needs to make him jealous. Maurice steps away for a moment and Harriet comes by. She tells Connie that her father is upset with her because he thinks she's copying Connie's amorous ways. Conklin doesn't believe that Connie and Philip have a platonic relationship. Harriet has a plan to show her father how innocent the relationship is. That evening, Harriet and Conklin hide in Mrs. Davis' house. Philip comes by and he and Connie just sit and talk. Maurice shows up and starts kissing Connie. After Maurice leaves, Connie kisses Philip. This is not what Harriet had planned for her father to see.
29	29	"Marinated Hearing"	Al Lewis	Al Lewis & Joseph Quillan	April 24, 1953
Connie tells Mrs. Davis that Conklin has made today Board of Education Day. Mr. Stone, the head of the board, will be there. Walter comes by and wants Connie to proof read an unflattering editorial of the school board and then leave it on Conklin's desk. She thinks he should make some changes to it first. Walter also mentions that Bones Snodgrass is worried about an upcoming test. Conklin tells Connie he wants to read Walter's editorial to Mr. Stone. She lies and tells him that it was lost and he should write one himself. Philip reads to Connie a grammatically incorrect paper that Bones wrote. Philip also found Walter's editorial. Connie rips up the editorial and accidentally Bones' paper as well. They leave for lunch and Bones puts Conklin's paper on Philip's desk for Connie to read. Walter sees it, thinks it's his and tears it up. Bones says he can put it back together. They think that Mr. Stone just drove up and Walter sets off a fire cracker in the school canon. Conklin now can't hear anything. Mr. Stone arrives and, as he still can't hear, Conklin wants Connie to read the paper. Bones' repair job leads to an unfortunate welcome speech to board member Mr. Stone.
30	30	"The Festival"	Al Lewis	Al Lewis & Joseph Quillan	May 1, 1953
Connie tells Mrs. Davis about a charity festival at the park which her and Mr. Boynton will attend. Walter comes by dressed in a costume for the festival. He says that there will be a prize for the couple with the most unusual costume. Walter and Harriet will go as Romeo and Juliet. Walter also mentions that thanks to Connie's petition, Gus Geary (Burt Mustin) the handyman and Katie (Elvia Allman) the scrub woman from school can attend. Katie apparently has strong feelings for Gus. At school, Katie tells Connie she won't be going to the festival as she doesn't have money for the ticket. Connie finds a way for Katie to get the money. Connie had borrowed Mrs. Conklin's car to go shopping for her new dress. Conklin demands money for the gas she used and now Connie has no money for her ticket to the festival. Connie gets to see Conklin in his Scottish bag piper player costume. Circumstances lead to Connie hearing Katie's hard luck story while Gus has the same tale for Philip. Because of this and a pawn shop, Connie and Philip go to the festival in outrageous outfits and Gus and Katie go in Connie and Philip's new clothes.
31	31	"Suzy Prentiss"	Al Lewis	Al Lewis & Joseph Quillan	May 8, 1953
Conklin informs Connie that Mr. Stone has asked him to make a speech at the annual Board of Education banquet that evening. Conklin is concerned that star baseball player, Bones Snodgrass, remain eligible to play despite his poor grades. Connie mentions that a new girl in class, Suzy Prentiss, did worse than Bones on the last test. Something has been bothering Bones and Conklin wants Connie to find out what it is. Bones tells Connie that he's been preoccupied because he's in love with Suzy Prentiss. He would like to take her to the banquet, but it's formal and he doesn't have a tuxedo. At lunch, Connie speaks with Suzy and she is definitely not too bright. Connie talks Suzy into going to the banquet with Bones. Walter comes by and tells Suzy how pretty she is. Connie needs to find formal wear for Bones and Suzy. Walter says Mrs. Davis' sister may have some to lend. Conklin learns that his wife sent their new formal wear to Mrs. Davis' house as Mrs. Conklin would be at the beauty parlor all day. Connie brings Bones and Suzy to Mrs. Davis' house, sees Conklin's formal wear and thinks it's for them. After the kids leave, Connie learns that the clothes belonged to Conklin. Conklin winds up getting his clothes back and neither Connie, Bones nor Suzy get to go to the banquet.
32	32	"Conklin Plays Detective"	Al Lewis	Al Lewis & Joseph Quillan	May 15, 1953
Mrs. Davis asks why Conklin has iron bars on his office windows. Connie tells her that last Friday someone broke into his office, stole a typewriter and made a long distance phone call. Conklin believes it was someone from school. Walter walks in with the morning paper and it states the Conklin is missing. It turns out that Walter accidentally locked Conklin in his office. Something Mr. Boynton says leads Connie and Walter to think he was the one in Conklin's office. He also says that Conklin is going to recommend him to the board for the head of the Biology department. At lunch, Conklin tells Harriet that he's going to set a trap for the thief. After something Bones Snodgrass says, Conklin now suspects Philip. Walter comes up with a plan to give Philip an alibi. Thinking that Conklin is with Philip, Connie, Bones and Walter go into Conklin's office and start trashing the place. Connie makes a long distance call. What they don't know is that Conklin is in the office dressed in a suit of armor. Before Conklin can do anything, they leave and lock him in. The next morning, Connie and Philip find Conklin in his office. Philip has a valid explanation for making the phone call and why the typewriter was missing. Conklin locks Connie in the office.
33	33	"Public Property on Parade"	Al Lewis	Al Lewis & Joseph Quillan	May 22, 1953
Mr. Conklin is to give a speech about respecting city property and he asks Connie to write it for him. Walter and Bones choose that day to bring various municipal items to Connie's home just as Conklin arrives with the mayor.
34	34	"Mrs Davis Reads Tea Leaves"	Al Lewis	Al Lewis & Joseph Quillan	May 29, 1953
At breakfast, Mrs. Davis tells Connie she's been studying reading tea leaves. She looks at Connie's tea cup and predicts a June wedding for Connie and Philip, and she'll come into sudden wealth. The mail arrives and Connie gets a tax refund for $110. Philip tells Connie he has something he would like to ask her and he wants to do it after school. Connie leaves for a moment. Philip tells Harriet that for summer he plans on running a children's camp at an old honeymoon cottage. He will need Connie's help. Connie overhears Philip talk about getting a license that afternoon and moving into honeymoon cottage when school ends. Philip comes by Connie's house and she expects a marriage proposal. When Connie admits that she heard part of his conversation with Harriet, Philip is glad and says they should start with 5 children and then have more later on. Things get more confusing for Connie when Philip mentions he'll need $100 from her to seal the deal. While Connie is in the kitchen, Conklin comes by. He likes Philip's idea for the camp and would like to partner with him. Philip says that he's asking Connie. Conklin then tells Connie that the two of them should take over honeymoon cottage. Connie is stunned when Conklin says he wants 50 children. Connie finally learns the men are talking about a summer camp.
35	35	"The Stolen Wardrobe"	Al Lewis	Al Lewis & Joseph Quillan	June 5, 1953
Walter gives Connie a scroll naming her best dressed teacher at Madison High. Meanwhile, Jerry Jones (Peter Leeds) and Mr. Smith (Herb Vigran) have just robbed a department store of furs and gowns. Their car ran out of gas by the school and they bring all the clothes into Connie's classroom. Jerry sees Connie's scroll and comes up with an idea. Connie comes back to her room and Jerry introduces himself as from the department store. He will give Connie some of the clothes to promote the store. Jerry asks her to take the rest of the clothes to her home after school, where he'll pick them up. Connie wears a new dress and a fur to Conklin's office. Conklin shows Mr. Boynton and Walter an article in the paper about the robbery. Conklin thinks Connie is teamed up with the thieves. Connie joins the men wearing a mink coat. She sees the newspaper and tells them about the men who posed as representatives of the store. At first Conklin doesn't believe her but then Walter has some information that backs up her story. There's a reward that Conklin intends on collecting. The police at the store think Conklin was one of the crooks so he, Philip, and Walter race back to the school. Their descriptions are released over the radio. Officer Halloway is waiting at Mrs. Davis' house. Connie shows up and then the men arrive wearing dresses. Halloway takes them all to the police station.
36	36	"Cure That Habit"	Al Lewis	Al Lewis & Joseph Quillan	June 12, 1953
Mrs. Davis tells Connie that her cat brought in two kittens. Connie says she and Walter will drop the kittens at Snodgrass' pet shop on the way to school. Walter tells Connie that as a practical joke he requested pamphlets about overcoming alcoholism be sent to Conklin's office. Meanwhile, Mr. Chambers (Parley Baer) of the firm "Cure That Habit" is speaking with head of the School Board, Mr. Stone (Herbert Heyes). Mr. Chambers is concerned about getting the requests for pamphlets being sent to Conklin as his son attends that school. The pet store wasn't open yet, so Connie and Walter bring the kittens to school. Harriet tells Connie that her father has been bothered by hiccups. Connie gives Conklin a jar of Mrs. Davis' homemade hiccup remedy. Connie and Philip give the kittens to Stretch Snodgrass to bring to his father's store. Stretch has to clean Conklin's office for the visit from Mr. Stone and Connie is to inspect it when he's done. The kittens and Stretch's frog and snake get loose in Conklin's office. Conklin finds the animals and he thinks the snake bit him, but Connie says it's just a bruise. Because of something Stretch did, Conklin is now dizzy and his glasses get broken. Mr. Stone and Mr. Chambers are in Conklin's office. Conklin walks in dizzy and not being able to see well. Other things he does leads the two men to think he's drunk. After the men leave, Conklin learns it was Walter that requested the pamphlets.
37	37	"Capistrano's Revenge"	Al Lewis	Al Lewis & Joseph Quillan	June 19, 1953
Mrs. Davis brings in a sparrow with an injured wing. Until it's well, she's keeping it in a shoebox so her cat doesn't get to it. Connie names the bird Philip. Mrs. Davis asks Connie to take the bird to Mr. Boynton to see if he can do anything for it. Conklin insists that Connie remove the bird from the school. Connie sneaks the bird into Philip's lab and Bones Snodgrass is there. Bones suggests that they take the bird to his father's pet store. Philip thinks he can help the bird. Conklin comes by and wants to get rid of the bird until he sees it. He changes his mind and wants Philip to help the bird. After Connie leaves, Philip tells Conklin that the bird has died. The men go to talk to Connie and she shows them a cage she bought for the bird. They can't bring themselves to tell Connie. Walter suggests that they find another sparrow to replace the dead one. The men think that Connie must be told, but still can't do it. Connie goes to Philip's lab and finds the dead bird. Back at Connie's house, Walter, Philip and then Conklin each come by with a live bird. Bones comes in with a bird and says he took Philip to his father and had him fixed up. The bird back in the lab was a stuffed bird.
38	38	"June Bride"	Al Lewis	Al Lewis & Joseph Quillan	June 26, 1953
Walter tells Connie that he and Harriet are planning a June wedding in six years. Mr. La Blanche comes by and asks Connie to stand in as proxy for his bride Georgette that afternoon. Georgette is in France and once the proxy marriage goes through, she can come to the States. Walter overhears just part of the conversation and leaves. Mr. Boynton comes by and Connie tells him she has to postpone their date and she can't tell him why right now. Mrs. Davis tells Connie that Walter told her about Connie marrying Maurice. Walter and Harriet urge Mr. Conklin to stop the wedding as they think she should marry Mr. Boynton. Maurice comes by Connie's house with Judge Goodwin (Arthur Q. Bryan). The Judge starts the ceremony and Mrs. Davis begins to cry. Conklin and Harriet burst in and stop the service. Maurice explains to them it is only a proxy marriage. Walter and Philip then walk in and they're told what's going on. The Judge is almost finished when a Messenger (Jerry Hausner) comes by with a telegram for Maurice. Georgette writes Maurice that she married soneone else.

=== Season 2 (1953–54) ===
No. overall	No. in season	Title	Directed by	Written by	Original release date
39	1	"Clay City Chaperone"	Al Lewis	Al Lewis & Joseph Quillan	October 2, 1953
Connie tells Mrs. Davis that she wishes she could go to Madison's football game in Clay City. Connie may be able to go as a chaperone to be with Mr. Boynton. Mr. Conklin is going to decide between her and Miss Daisy Enright (Mary Jane Croft). Connie knows that Daisy is also fond of Mr. Boynton. Connie will try and influence Conklin into picking her. At school, both Connie and Daisy do what they can to please Conklin. Conklin tells the two that he has decided to have his wife be the chaperone. At lunch, Connie tries to talk Philip out of going to the game. Harriet tells Connie that her mother can't go to the game and her father flipped a coin and Connie won. Connie goes to Philip's lab and he tells her he's decided to not go to the game. Connie now tries to talk him into going. Philip says that he has promised his ticket to Mr. La Blanche. Philip figures he'll just take Daisy to a movie. As Daisy doesn't know that Philip isn't going, Connie is able to sell her ticket to her. Daisy then learns from Walter that Philip isn't going. Philip tells Connie he's changed his mind and is going to the game. Connie tells Daisy she feels bad for what she did and buys the ticket back from her. Daisy then learns she's been tricked again. In Clay City, Connie finds out from Conklin that she messed something up and the football team has no transportation to the game.
40	2	"Bones, Son of Cyrano"	Al Lewis	Al Lewis & Joseph Quillan	October 9, 1953
Connie tells Mrs. Davis that Mr. Boynton borrowed a copy of Cyrano de Bergerac. Walter comes by. He tells Connie that someone has been sending love poetry to Harriet and she has become very distant to him. Connie tells him to write some poetry for Harriet as well. Philip writes out a passage from Cyrano and gives it to Walter to give to Harriet. Harriet tells Connie that she's figured out who her secret admirer is. She recognizes the handwriting. She'll hand the letter back to him so he'll know that she knows. Harriet sees Philip and hands him the letter. Philip misunderstands and gives the letter to Connie. Connie reads it and thinks he wrote it for her. Bones Snodgrass tells Connie that despite his best friend Walter being crazy for Harriet, he is crazy for her as well. He tells Connie that he's been sending her the poetry. Connie gives Bones the letter that Philip gave her to give to Harriet. She also gives him a requisition for flower pots that he should give to Conklin. Bones gives the requisition to Harriet and the love letter to Conklin. Conklin has a confusing conversation with Connie. Things finally get straightened out.
41	3	"Spare the Rod"	Al Lewis	Al Lewis & Joseph Quillan	October 16, 1953
Conklin reprimands Connie for not having her blackboard clean before class. Plus, there was a disparaging remark about him on it. Connie will have to check all the blackboards after school as punishment. Because of a clean-up program that's starting, Conklin wants Walter to remove some files from the previous principal, Mr. Darwell. Connie remembers him as quite a tyrant. Connie asks Stretch Snodgrass to help Walter. Walter finds a letter from the School Board that chastised Mr. Darwell for his tyrannical rule. It also stated that if he didn't change his ways, he would be replaced. As it didn't mention Mr. Darwell by name, Walter gives it to Conklin. Conklin reads the letter and believes he's in trouble. Connie is surprised when Conklin acts incredibly nice to her. Walter tells Connie and Mr. Boynton what he did. Conklin asks Connie for a list of his shortcomings that he may improve himself. Thanks to something Harriet points out, Conklin realizes he's been tricked. Conklin goes back to his old ways.
42	4	"Faculty Band"	Al Lewis	Al Lewis & Joseph Quillan	October 23, 1953
Mr. Conklin tells Harriet that the faculty band has been chosen to play at the Board of Education Ball next week. Several teachers have signed up to audition for the one vacancy in the band. Mr. Boyton is in charge of the band. Connie comes by and signs up as well. Walter tells Connie that Conklin is going to audition for Mr. Boynton during lunch before the actual auditions after school. Connie finds a way for Philip to join her for lunch instead. Connie, Walter and Philip are talking together and Conklin shows up with a horn. Conklin decides he can audition right then. While Conklin is talking, Walter fills his horn with water. Not knowing about the water, Connie says she would like to play the horn first. Walter signals her not to play, but now Conklin insists she does. Conklin gets his face sprayed with water. Philip comes by Mrs. Davis' house for lunch and Connie will audition on violin. But it will actually be Mrs. Davis playing from behind a room divider. Philip figures out what they are doing, but says he'll give Connie another chance. Conklin comes by with his horn. This time Mrs. Davis fills the horn with coffee. Later, Conklin says he's the winner by default because he talked the others into resigning.
43	5	"The Little Visitor"	Al Lewis	Arthur Alsberg, Al Lewis, & Joseph Quillan	October 30, 1953
Connie tells Mrs. Davis that she believes that the Conklin's are going to have a baby. Connie spoke with Mrs. Conklin and expecting a little visitor was mentioned. Walter comes by and says something strange is going on at the Conklin's house. At school, Conklin tells Harriet how upset he is because he just found out that the family will be taking care of his sister-in-law's pet monkey, whose name is Baby. Supt. Edgar T. Stone (Joseph Kearns) is supposed to come by to discuss a possible extra position for Conklin. Harriet says that one of her classmate's mother might be dropping off her 8 month old baby sister. The class will get some training in taking care of a baby. Connie and Conklin have a confusing conversation about the visitor that will be coming. Connie and Philip go shopping for a baby gift. Conklin and Edgar are talking about how his extra position will take up more of his time. Edgar hopes that family won't be a problem. Connie and Philip come by with the bathinette they have just bought. Walter comes in with the 8-month-old baby. Edgar thinks the baby is Conklin's. Harriet comes in and says that Baby has arrived, meaning the monkey. Edgar is upset that Conklin would take the extra job when he has the new children. Edgar leaves. Things get straightened out and explained to Supt. Stone. Jerry Hausner as Store Clerk.
44	6	"Trial by Jury"	Al Lewis	Al Lewis & Joseph Quillan	November 6, 1953
Connie mentions to Mrs. Davis that Conklin has started another traffic safety campaign. Plus, Connie got a ticket the other day and she requested a trial by jury. Her trial is that day and before school ends. She has to figure out how she can get there without Conklin finding out. Walter comes by and learns about Connie's ticket. At school, Connie does a couple things that irritate Conklin and he refuses to give her the afternoon off. Despite Walter promising not to say anything, it's not long before many in the school know about Connie's ticket. Conklin tells Harriet that he's upset that he can't go fishing that day as he's been called for jury duty. Mr. Boynton, Walter and Bones Snodgrass attempt to help Connie leave early, but it fails. Connie learns from Harriet that Conklin will be leaving school early, so now Connie can leave as well. In court, Connie tells the jury her side of the story. She then sees Conklin in the jury box.
45	7	"Phone Book Follies"	Al Lewis	Al Lewis & Joseph Quillan	November 13, 1953
Mr. Jackson (Lawrence Dobkin), from the phone company, comes by Mrs. Davis' house to drop of the new phone book. But he can only do so if he takes the old one back. Mrs. Davis can't find the old one. Her and Connie wonder if one of their friends could have taken the book. Mrs. Davis invited Conklin and Mr. Boynton over for dinner that night. Something Philip says to Connie leads her to think Conklin took her phone book. Meanwhile, Conklin tells Harriet that Mrs. Conklin can't find their phone book. Conklin suspects Connie. Connie wants to look at the book in Conklin's office but he won't let her see it. Conklin overhears Connie tell Philip how she intends to sneak into his office and look at the book. Conklin catches the two in his office, but the phone book is missing. That night, Philip and Conklin arrive for dinner. Things are very awkward for awhile. Mr. Jackson comes by to see if Connie has found her book. It seems that Mrs. Davis inadvertently was the one that took everyone's missing phone books.
46	8	"Thanksgiving Show"	Al Lewis	Al Lewis & Joseph Quillan	November 20, 1953
Unable to afford a turkey, Mrs. Davis will have a tiny squab for her Thanksgiving. Mrs. Davis asks Connie if Mr. Boyton is taking her out for Thanksgiving. When Connie says he can't afford it, Mrs. Davis says the two of them are welcome to eat with her. Mrs. Davis says that maybe Connie can get an invitation from one of her friends. Walter comes by and Connie hints at an invitation. Walter says his parents will be out of town and he's going to Stretch Snodgrass' house. Walter misunderstands Connie and says that he and Stretch will eat with her. When Connie learns that Philip won a turkey in a raffle, she invites him over for Thanksgiving. He tells her that he sent the turkey to his parents upstate. It's Thanksgiving day and Mrs. Davis thinks Connie should try and get an invitation to the Conklin's. Martha Conklin misunderstands Connie and thinks her, Osgood and Harriet have been invited to Mrs. Davis' house. The guests arrive and everyone helps set the table. Conklin talks about how hungry he is. Connie brings out the tiny squab. Later, Conklin sees Connie and Philip at the Mission where he donated his turkey. Note: With this episode, Paula Winslowe replaces Virginia Gordon in the role of Martha Conklin.
47	9	"Vitamin E-4"	Al Lewis	Al Lewis & Joseph Quillan	November 27, 1953
Connie tells Mrs. Davis that her sister Doris is going to have a baby. As Doris' husband is unemployed, Connie would like to help financially. Connie knows she doesn't make enough money as a teacher. Connie says that Professor Anderson (Frank Nelson (voice)) offered her a better paying job. The Professor has discovered a new vitamin called E-4 and would like her to go on a nation-wide lecture tour with him. Connie has excepted the job, but she had signed a contract to not resign mid-term at school. Connie hopes to find a way to get fired. At school, a Police Lieutenant (Barney Phillips) tells Supt. Edgar T. Stone that Professor Anderson is a fraud and has been arrested. He's telling this to Edgar because Anderson often uses teachers to make him look legitimate. Connie skips her first class and Conklin is quite mad at her. Meanwhile, Mr. Boynton tells Walter that he's going to take a job with Professor Anderson. Philip acts rudely towards Connie in hopes that she won't miss him as much when he leaves. Conklin calls Supt. Stone, but Stone refuses to fire Connie. Both Connie and Philip act outrageously in front of Conklin. Conklin tells Harriet that he won't tolerate that kind of insubordination and will accept a job offer from Professor Anderson. Connie, Philip and Conklin go to Anderson's vitamin laboratory. They don't recognize each other because of the protective head gear they're wearing. They follow Anderson's tape recorded instructions. Conklin winds up getting drenched in a thick liquid and the three discover who each other are. The Police Lieutenant and Stone come in and tell them that Anderson is a phony.
48	10	"Swap Week"	Al Lewis	Al Lewis & Joseph Quillan	December 11, 1953
Connie tells Mrs. Davis that it's swap week at school. It was started by a new boy, Larry Clayton (Robert Ellis). Larry comes by and tells Connie that he swapped with Walter for 50 percent ownership in Walter's car. It's his turn to drive Connie to school. Larry says that Mr. Boyton is going out of town after school. Philip is going to see Supt. Edgar T. Stone up at a cabin where Stone fractured his ankle. He's hoping Stone will promote him to Head of the Biology department. Larry wants to be compensated for driving Connie, so he swaps her for her record player. At school, Conklin is upset that he wasn't picked to go see Stone. Conklin figures out a way for him to see Stone and not Philip. Connie comes up with a plan to swap and get Philip a percentage of Walter's car so he can drive up to see Stone. Conklin overhears this and does some swapping with Walter and Larry to get a controlling percentage of Walter's car. Connie finds a way for Philip to drive the car to see Stone.
49	11	"Oh, Dem Golden Slippers"	Al Lewis	Al Lewis & Joseph Quillan	December 18, 1953
Connie goes into a shoe store and meets the salesman, T.J. McFadden (Dan Tobin). She's there to buy slippers for the school masquerade ball. McFadden acts very strangely and Connie is a bit uncomfortable. He lets her try on a pair of slippers and they fit Connie perfectly. He references Cinderella. But McFadden says they're not for sale. Connie may borrow them and they will be picked up at her home at midnight. He won't charge Connie for the rental and then asks for a kiss. Connie refuses. At school, Mr. Boyton and Walter show Connie their costumes. Walter gives Connie a package that arrived for her. In it is a beautiful gown with an unsigned card. After looking at Connie's slippers, Philip tells her the heels are solid gold. Connie goes back to the shoe store and Mr. Hillman, the owner, tells her there is no salesman there by the name of McFadden. And the store has never had slippers like the ones she claims she got there. Conklin gives Connie some flowers that arrived for her with another unsigned note. When the two leave Conklin's office, McFadden comes out of the closet. Mrs. Davis gives Connie a telegram that states a coach will pick her up and take her to the Ball. At the Ball, Conklin rigs it so Harriet wins the new golf bag prize. Back at home, Connie waits for someone to pick up the slippers and gown. When she's out of the room, McFadden comes by and switches boxes that she had the stuff in. Connie hears a news report that explains who the mysterious T.J. McFadden was and Connie's role in the mystery.
50	12	"The Magic Tree"	Al Lewis	Al Lewis & Joseph Quillan	December 25, 1953
It's Christmas Eve and Mrs. Davis is going away, leaving Connie alone. A little boy comes to the door with a sob story and is trying to sell Christmas trees. He says the trees are magic and Connie agrees to buy one. It's a little fake one, but Connie likes it. Connie falls asleep holding Minerva the cat. She then has a dream. Walter comes by with a present for Connie. He tells her he was to spend the evening with family but he was able to visit her for a little while. Walter thanks her for allowing him to come to her for advice. Connie mentions that Mr. Boynton had to go visit his parents. Connie has a gift for Walter but he says he'll open it later. The Conklins then arrive. Osgood asks Connie if she prepared next semesters schedule. Connie says that she took the time off from school as a vacation. Philip shows up and tells Connie that his parents decided to come see him and will arrive in the morning. Walter and Harriet want Philip to stand under the mistletoe with Connie. But he's allergic and starts sneezing. Harriet suggests opening presents. Walter touches the little fake tree, it starts glowing and he gets a funny feeling. He tells Harriet she needs to be more alluring like Connie. Conklin, who wasn't thrilled about being at Connie's house, touches the tree and gets the holiday spirit. He makes Connie head of the school's English department. Philip touches the tree and suddenly takes Connie in his arms and kisses her. Connie says she feels as though she were in a dream. Connie then wakes up and the Conklins, Walter and Philip show up. Connie notices the little fake tree is gone. The little boy selling trees comes to the door again and Connie says she'll buy ten of them.
51	13	"Hospital Capers"	Al Lewis	Arthur Alsberg, Al Lewis, & Joseph Quillan	January 8, 1954
Mr. Boynton is in the hospital because he injured himself falling into a hole that should've been covered up on a lot near school. Connie visits him quite often and brings him books about marriage. Connie is rubbing Philip's temples when she is interrupted by Gus the window washer (Jack Kruschen). Philip tells Connie that while he was in the ambulance, Mr. Glint (Frank Nelson), a Lawyer, made him sign a contract stating he would sue the owner of the property for $5000. At school, Conklin tells Connie he knows that Philip intends on suing the owner of the property. He then tells Connie he's the owner. And if Conklin loses the lawsuit, he will take the money out of Connie's salary. Conklin would like Connie to convince Philip to take a cash settlement of $25. Conklin actually doesn't want his name to come out in the courts. He tells Connie he's fully insured. Conklin gave Connie an envelope to mail a week ago that contained his insurance renewal. Connie forgot to mail the envelope and Conklin's insurance policy has lapsed. Connie goes to talk to Mr. Glint and says that Mr. Boynton wants to drop the suit. According to the contract, if Philip drops the suit, he still has to pay Glint $250. Connie almost tricks Conklin into paying the $250.
52	14	"Postage Due"	Al Lewis	Al Lewis & Joseph Quillan	January 15, 1954
Mailman Mr. Bagley (Steven Geray) left a $.20 postage due envelope for Connie with Mrs. Davis. Bagley was in a rush and didn't wait for the money. Mrs. Davis learned today that Mr. Bagley quit his job due to his health. Connie goes to the Post Office and learns that Bagley paid the $.20 himself. When Connie says she'll go to Bagley's apartment, the Postal Clerk tells her that they learned he moved without a forwarding address. Because he's elderly, Connie's worried about him and wants to go to the police. Surprisingly, Conklin is fond of Mr. Bagley also. Conklin and Connie are afraid something bad has happened to him. The two enlist Mr. Boynton to help try and find Bagley. Connie and Philip play detective and go to see Bagley's landlady, but don't learn much. They then go to Bagley's barber (Jerry Hausner). Philip will check the hospitals and Connie will rendezvous with Conklin. Connie and Conklin talk to the Green Grocer (Peter Leeds) and he says that Bagley wanted to travel. The two find Bagley at the pier. A Postal Policeman (Barney Phillips) and the Postal Clerk show up. It turns out that Bagley is wanted for forgery. Bagley removed checks from the mail and forged signatures. If it weren't for Connie trying to track him down, he never would have been caught.
53	15	"Do It Yourself"	Al Lewis	Al Lewis & Joseph Quillan	January 22, 1954
Walter tells Connie that last night, Conklin's garage exploded and was completely destroyed. Connie wants a new nightstand. Walter suggests she build her own. When he says how much a new one costs, Connie decides to give building one a try. But to use the tools from shop class, she'll have to lead Conklin to believe she has experience building things. Meanwhile, Conklin complains to Harriet about the cost of a new garage, especially the labor. Connie and Walter come by Conklin's house to pick up Harriet. Walter greatly exaggerates Connie's carpentry skills. Conklin appoints Connie the foreman of the construction of his new garage. Connie tells Mr. Boynton that they should enlist the Shop Instructor, Mr. Gorman, to help. Harriet tells them that Mr. Gorman was the one that gave her father the first high cost estimate. Walter says that due to an approaching storm, Conklin wants to be able to put his car in the garage by nightfall. Connie, Philip and Walter somehow manage to get the garage built. Conklin wants Connie to christen the garage with a bottle of champagne. When she hits it, the whole garage collapses.
54	16	"Bobsey's Twins in Stir"	Al Lewis	Al Lewis & Joseph Quillan	January 29, 1954
Mr. Boynton comes by to pick up Connie for school. He tells her that Supt. Stone has launched "Love your neighbor" week. Connie mentions that Mrs. Davis didn't come home last night. Connie gets a call saying Mrs. Davis spent the night in jail. Connie gets to the jail. The Jailor (Frank Gerstle) says that Mrs. Davis has been cleared but needs to stay to talk to the District Attorney. Mrs. Davis says she'll then go to visit her sister for a couple days, so Connie leaves. It turns out that Mrs. Davis was selling charity tickets to the Policeman's Ball that were fake. Not knowing this, Connie wants to help Mrs. Davis and sell the rest of the tickets she had at home. At school, Conklin tells Connie that Mr. Fairchild (Earle Ross), of the Citizen's Committee, will give a silver loving cup to the principal who does the most for charity that week. Conklin will help Connie sell her tickets. Connie, Conklin and Philip sell all their tickets and would like to get more. Connie gets Bones Snodgrass to print up more tickets for her. It's not long before Connie, Philip and Conklin are in jail. Supt. Stone and Mr. Fairchild are arrested as well. Mrs. Davis comes to the jail and says that Mr. Fairchild is the one that gave her the fake tickets in the first place.
55	17	"The Jockey"	Al Lewis	Arthur Alsberg, Al Lewis & Joseph Quillan	February 12, 1954
Mr. Boynton asks Connie if Mrs. Davis could put up his friend Billy Bunker for a few days. Philip then asks Connie if they can put up Billy's horse. Billy is a jockey and he owes quite a bit of money. He has to lay low until an upcoming race that he hopes to win and then pay off his debts. While she's still on the phone with Philip, Billy arrives. At school, Philip and Connie are talking and suddenly Billy shows up. There were some strangers prowling around Mrs. Davis' neighborhood and he figured he'd be safer at the school. If Conklin runs into Billy, they'll try to pass him off as a student. Because Conklin knows all the students, Connie, Philip and Walter start to make him think he's losing his memory. Conklin does come in contact with Billy and they tell him Billy is a transfer student who's been here for three weeks. That night it's raining. Billy brings his horse into the house because the garage is leaking. Conklin comes by and eventually sees Billy and the horse. Philip explains things to Conklin. Later, Billy does win some races, but with different horses as his had a pony.
56	18	"Brook's New Car"	Al Lewis	Al Lewis & Joseph Quillan	February 19, 1954
Connie had a car that rolled down a hill and crashed into a fruit stand. Connie tells Walter she bought a used car and it's in the shop being repaired. She backed into another car and put a dent in her fender. While picking up Harriet, Connie speaks with Mrs. Conklin. Connie hopes that Osgood will let her out of school early to pick up the car. Martha tells Connie that Osgood is not in a good mood. Conklin tells Connie that someone backed into his car and it wound up rolling down a hill and crashed into a fruit stand. Conklin has a description of the car. He doesn't know it yet, but it matches Connie's car. At school, Connie tells Mr. Boynton what she did to Conklin's car. She also mentions that she's having her car repainted so Conklin doesn't find out. Conklin overheard what she said and he demands that she pay the $200 for his repairs. Mrs. Davis tells Connie and Philip that she hit a fruit stand with her car. Mrs. Davis is able to lend Connie $150. Conklin tells Connie that the garage revised the bill to $350. Connie delivers some books to the Conklin house using a little red wagon. Harriet tells her mother and Connie that, because his car was so damaged, Osgood got a new car. Connie left the wagon in the driveway and Conklin crashes into it. It turns out that Conklin wasn't supposed to be able to buy the car he just crashed because it was Connie's.
57	19	"The Hobo Jungle"	Al Lewis	Al Lewis & Joseph Quillan	February 26, 1954
Connie stops by a make-shift Hobo home and speaks with Harvey Poole (Sid Melton), Melvin Fenwick (Ned Glass) and Tom Brent. She has learned that honor student Harvey Brent has given a false address to where he lives. The address he gave is to a vacant lot. Harriet followed Harvey home one day and was led to this building. Tom admits that Harvey is his son. Tom is a widower and he became depressed and lost his business and home. Connie's says she'll think about whether to report it to the school or not. Connie lies to Conklin and says that Harvey does live at the address he originally gave. Conklin says he'll go visit the house. Meanwhile, it's the anniversary of the day Connie started at Madison and she wants to celebrate with Mr. Boynton. Connie finds a way to have Conklin believe a house next to the vacant lot is Harvey's house. Philip and Conklin come by Mrs. Davis' house to have a surprise party for Connie and hide in the kitchen. Mrs. Davis thinks Connie's in her room, but actually Connie left to go pick up Philip. Connie is at Philip's place and she finds out he's not there. She decides to go visit Tom and his friends. They think it's Connie's birthday and give her a present. Harvey brings Philip and Mrs. Davis by and they tell her about the surprise party. Tom and Harvey bring out a birthday cake.
58	20	"The Wild Goose"	Al Lewis	Al Lewis & Joseph Quillan	March 12, 1954
Mrs. Davis had an early appointment, so her sister Angela Devon (Jesslyn Fax) fixed breakfast for Connie. As it's Saturday, Connie hopes to get a date with Mr. Boynton. Angela doesn't want Minerva the cat all alone all day, so she asks Connie to drop the cat off with Harriet. Walter comes by. Angela lends Connie her car and Connie leaves with the cat. Despite it not being April, Walter wants to play an early April Fool's joke on Conklin. Walter calls Conklin pretending to be a radio quiz program and tells him he's won a TV set, but he'll have to pick it up. Connie drops off Minerva at the Conklin's. As his wife has the car, Conklin asks Connie to pick up the TV. Connie goes to the store and talks to Philip, who's working there filling in for a friend. Walter has left a couple of notes that leads Connie and Philip back and forth looking for the TV. They decide to take one of the store's floor model TV's to Conklin. Not knowing what they did and wanting to help, Stretch Snodgrass also takes a floor model to bring to Conklin. Conklin has Walter drive him to the store and Conklin takes one of the floor model TVs and leaves a note. Everyone arrives back at Conklin's house with the TVs. Walter confesses to Connie that Conklin winning the TV was a practical joke. Mr. Hurley, the store detective, shows up and things get straightened out. But Conklin still doesn't know who played the trick on him.
59	21	"Hello, Mr. Chips"	Al Lewis	Arthur Alsberg, Al Lewis, & Joseph Quillan	March 19, 1954
Mrs. Davis is taking a brief vacation, so Angela is still minding the house. Connie is feeling down because of all the time she's spent with Mr. Boynton and there still isn't a romance blossoming. She also heard Philip telling someone that the time for marriage is when one is too old for anything else. Angela thinks Connie should start to make Philip feel old. At school, Conklin tells Connie he wants to impress an important visitor named Hetherington Philpot. Hetherington is a British Headmaster and Connie is to show him around. Connie is expecting an old doddering man but Philpot turns out to be young and handsome. Philpot asks Connie if she would spend the evening with him. Philip was to come over to dinner that evening, but Connie will work something out. Connie asks Walter to come over that evening as well to help her with her plan to make Philip feel old. At dinner, Connie and Angela serve Philip soft foods and say other things to imply he's getting old. Walter comes by and also mentions Philip's age. Then Hetherington arrives and Philip is surprised to see how handsome he is. Connie's plan backfires when Hetherington mentions how tired he is after touring the school. Hetherington then suggests for the next day that they go do what turns out to be the same boring thing she always does with Philip.
60	22	"The Parlor Game"	Al Lewis	Al Lewis & Joseph Quillan	March 23, 1954
Conklin calls Connie and would like her help in a personal matter. Conklin is not happy about the blossoming romance between Harriet and Walter. At school, Conklin tells Connie that he intends to invite Walter over to the house that evening. He would like Connie and Mr. Boynton to be there as well. Harriet shows up to Conklin's office and Conklin wants Connie to talk to her. But instead of Connie doing all the talking, she winds up getting romance advice from Harriet. At lunch, Connie tries some of Harriet's tips on Philip, but they don't work. That night at the Conklin house, things are pretty dull. Walter suggests going to a ballroom to hear a band, but Conklin says everyone's staying. When Conklin leaves the room, Martha Conklin comes up with a plan so that Harriet, Walter, Connie and Philip can go. Connie makes up an absurd parlor game and gives the long list of rules. Now, even Conklin wants to go to the ballroom.
61	23	"A Dry Scalp Is Better Than None"	Al Lewis	Al Lewis & Joseph Quillan	April 9, 1954
Angela finds a letter that Connie was writing to Mrs. Davis. In it, Connie points out some of Angela's faults, including being a hypochondriac. Dr. Bedford calls Angela and tells her that her test results are in and there's absolutely nothing wrong with her. Bedford says the only thing wrong with her is her incurable need for sympathy. Angela lies and tells Connie she only has one month to live. Angela says she wishes she could see one more Christmas. When Connie talks to Mr. Boynton about Angela, he suggests throwing her a Christmas party that evening. Connie asks Conklin to the party and when he hears the reason, he accepts. Connie asks Walter to find her a Christmas tree. That night, Connie, Philip and Conklin each show up dressed as Santa Claus. After they surprise Angela, the three start crying. They then give Angela her presents. After Angela leaves the room for a moment, Dr. Bedford comes by. Bedford explains that there's nothing wrong with Angela. Philip leaves because there was a film about frogs he wanted to see. Bedford comes up with a plan to make Angela appreciate that she's healthy. But things don't go exactly as they should.
62	24	"The English Test"	Al Lewis	Al Lewis & Joseph Quillan	April 16, 1954
Connie mentions to Walter about the English test the next day. She's going to seat him elsewhere because she knows he's been cheating off of Harriet's work. Connie goes to Mr. Boynton's lab and runs into student Nora. Connie suspects Nora has been cheating as well. Connie asks Philip what time he will pick her up that evening for dinner. Conklin orders Connie to tutor Harriet that evening for the English test. Philip and Connie are having lunch and she tells him about Harriet. He says they can go on the date later in the evening. Nora's father comes by and he's worried about the test. Philip volunteers Connie to tutor Nora that evening. Walter wants to come by as well. That night the three students arrive at Connie's house. The tutoring begins and Connie knows that Walter and Nora are cheating off of Harriet. Harriet says that she's been helping the other two study. She also tells Connie that she told the two to cheat off of her now so they would finish sooner and Connie could go out with Philip. Nora's father comes to pick her up. As a thank you for what Connie's doing, he wants Connie and Philip to have a free night at the night club he runs.
63	25	"Second Hand-First Aid"	Al Lewis	Arthur Alsberg, Al Lewis, & Joseph Quillan	April 23, 1954
Connie tells Mrs. Davis that she's happy because Miss Daisy Enright will be taking a leave of absence for the rest of the semester. She's going upstate to take care of her sick sister. Mrs. Davis is upset because Daisy was teaching a course in Red Cross first aid that she was attending. At school, Conklin tells Connie he wants her to teach the first aid class three nights a week. Daisy tells Connie that it was her that recommended Connie to take over the class. She also mentions how her sister will now be coming to stay with her. This means she can still see Mr. Boynton while Connie is busy at night. Conklin and Daisy will come by Connie's house that night to go over things. Walter suggests to Connie that she fake incompetence to avoid having to teach the class. That night as Conklin watches, Connie shows her lack of skill by working on Daisy, who's pretending to be the patient. Mr. Boynton shows up and says he would like to sign up for the class. Connie is thrilled, but then Conklin says because of Connie's lack of skills, Daisy will resume teaching the class.
64	26	"The Egg"	Al Lewis	Al Lewis & Joseph Quillan	April 30, 1954
Mrs. Davis got some eggs from her brother Victor's farm in the country and is down to the last one. She thinks it might be fertile. Connie says she'll take it to Mr. Boynton for an answer. At school, Connie has Philip take a look at the egg. He doubts it has a chick inside, but they'll keep it warm for a while. Conklin comes by and says that a picture magazine will be running its annual photographic contest next week. He would like to get a series of pictures of the egg hatching. Conklin sets up a watch in his office with the egg and his camera. Connie's worried about the effects of all the flash bulbs on the young bird. Knowing how Connie feels, Walter tells her he switched the egg with a white rock. Philip thinks the thought of Conklin waiting for a rock to hatch is funny. Connie is in Conklin's office when he figures out the egg is fake. Connie has Victor come by the school. Walter tells Connie and Philip that he was worried Conklin might get the real egg so he switched it again. Conklin wants to know where the real egg is. But it's too late as Connie is holding the chick in her hand.
65	27	"The Bakery"	Al Lewis	Al Lewis & Joseph Quillan	May 14, 1954
Miss Brooks learns a woman from Philip Boynton's past is in town and is extremely curious. Her only clue is the lady is connected to the bakery so Connie investigates, trying not to be caught but fails miserably.
66	28	"Old Age Plan"	Al Lewis	Al Lewis & Joseph Quillan	May 21, 1954
Angela thinks that Connie should sell insurance to people at school and earn some extra money. Walter comes by and Connie talks to him about planning for his old age. At school, Connie talks to Conklin about the symptoms of old age. Connie then talks to Mr. Boynton about the policy, but he doesn't think he could afford a quarter a day. Connie reminds him about them going to her friends wedding that evening. Philip and Conklin start to feel a variety of ailments. Connie comes home early and tells Mrs. Davis that Philip and Conklin have come down with imaginary illnesses. They're going to stop by to be nursed back to health. Connie is going to pretend to be very sick and hopefully they'll forget about their illness and help her. But her plan backfires when the men figure that if she worries about their pain, she'll forget about hers. Conklin fakes a pain and Connie feels better and tries to help. Then Philip has a pain and Connie and Conklin try to help him. This goes on between the three of them for a while until they realize they were all faking.
67	29	"The Hawkins Travel Agency"	Al Lewis	Arthur Alsberg, Al Lewis, & Joseph Quillan	May 30, 1954
Connie tells Mrs. Davis that she is determined to travel during the summer break. She went to the Hawkins Travel Agency about a European vacation. If she can enlist three others to be paying customers, she can get her tour for a third of the price. At school, Connie tells Walter her plan if he promises not to tell anyone else. Conklin tells Harriet about the Hawkins Travel Agency offer and he hopes to get Supt. Edgar T. Stone to sign up to go to Honolulu. Conklin and Connie both try to entice each other into traveling without knowing each has the same plan in mind. Mr. Boynton also knows about the Hawkins offer and tries to get Connie interested in going to Mexico. Each of the three thinks they've got the other two signed up for the plan. The three are each going to try to get Supt. Stone to sign up. Conklin talks to Stone wearing a Hawaiian shirt. Philip comes into the office wearing a sombrero. Connie arrives wearing a sexy French dress. Stone tells them that he set up a trip with Hawkins for the four of them on a safari through darkest Africa.
68	30	"The Bicycle Thief"	Al Lewis	Al Lewis & Joseph Quillan	June 11, 1954
Connie tells Mrs. Davis that she's making a box lunch for a student named Stevie Coleman as he can't buy one. Mrs. Davis mentions that Conklin has been using a bicycle for his shopping trips. She also saw him at the bowling alley last night and he was in a very bad mood. At school, Conklin tells Connie he's mad because someone stole his bike while he was at the grocery store. Connie learns from Stevie that his father has been out of work for three months. Stevie's been doing some odd jobs to help. Stevie admits to taking Conklin's bike. But he didn't know it was Conklin's until he saw a notice about it on the bulletin board. It was Stevie's birthday yesterday and he just borrowed the bike and then put it back at the store. Harriet tells her father and Connie that Mr. Daniels, their milkman, saw a boy take the bike. When he went to the store this morning the bike was there and he took it for safe keeping. Mr. Daniels wants to give Conklin a description of the boy before he leaves town. Connie comes up with a plan to delay Conklin from seeing Mr. Daniels. Something else happens that makes Conklin glad the boy took the bike.
69	31	"Just Remember the Red River Valley"	Al Lewis	Al Lewis & Joseph Quillan	June 18, 1954
Connie has no money and is behind on her rent. Mrs. Davis asks Connie where she'll spend her vacation. Mrs. Davis suggests that to get some money she should tutor some children in Deacon Jones' hillbilly square dance troupe. Something Walter says makes Connie think that her and Mr. Boynton should apply for the job. Philip tells Connie that Deacon also expects the tutors to double as entertainers. Conklin comes into Philip's lab. He says that their school came in last in faculty efficiency. There will be no more faculty fraternizing during the school day. Connie and Philip hide in the supply room to rehearse for Deacon's audition. Conklin catches them and knows what they're rehearsing for. Conklin tells them that the Inspector for the state education board is due to arrive. Conklin is interested in the audition when he hears how much the job pays. Matthew Jones (Frank Nelson), the Inspector, shows up. Harriet thinks he's Deacon Jones and tells him where to go for the audition. Connie and Philip meet Matthew and they're dressed and act like hillbillies. Walter and Conklin arrive as hillbillies as well. They sing the Red River Valley. Supt. Stone shows up and they learn who Matthew really is.

=== Season 3 (1954–55) ===
No. overall	No. in season	Title	Directed by	Written by	Original release date
70	1	"The Miserable Caballeros"	Al Lewis	Al Lewis & Joseph Quillan	October 1, 1954
Connie meets Ricky Velasco, a young boy who happens to walk into her classroom. Ricky is very good at giving compliments and wants to enter high school. He says he is with his Uncle Alberto (Rico Alaniz), who is in town on business. Ricky gives Connie the impression he's an orphan and his Uncle mistreats him. Connie asks Mr. Boynton what they should do about Ricky and they decide to get Conklin involved. Conklin wants Connie to get rid of the boy. Ricky comes in and smooth talks Conklin. Ricky and Connie are having lunch. Philip comes by. Ricky says that if the two of them got married, they could adopt him. Ricky goes back to Connie's classroom. Conklin tells Connie and Philip that Alberto has reported Ricky missing and the police will pick him up. Connie knows that Ricky will miss them. They might have to act indifferent to him so it will be easier for him to leave. Ricky tells Harriet that he will have to be mean to the others so they will not be sad to see him go. Ricky tries to put on his act, but it doesn't last long. Alberto shows up and it turns out that he hasn't mistreated Ricky. Also, Ricky's parents are alive and very wealthy. The whole thing stemmed from a bet Ricky had with his cousin about getting into high school.
71	2	"Blood, Sweat and Laugh"	Al Lewis	Al Lewis & Joseph Quillan	October 15, 1954
Connie is told by Mr. Conklin to pick up their costumes for a masquerade ball. She accidentally gets the incorrect outfits, getting ones reserved for an important state official and his wife who Osgood wanted to impress.
72	3	"Life Can Be Bones"	Al Lewis	Al Lewis & Joseph Quillan	October 22, 1954
Mr. Boynton's been doing extra work because Mr. Banning resigned from the Biology department. Connie's been lobbying Conklin to get a replacement. Connie learns that the new Biology teacher that's to help Philip is a Miss Sanders. Philip tells Connie that he and Miss Sanders have a lot in common, especially Paleontology. Walter wants to help Connie. He makes up a story that he found a fossil skull in Connie's backyard. Philip says he'll break his date with Miss Sanders to do some more digging in Connie's yard. After Philip leaves, Connie tells Walter to bury some butcher bones in her yard. Walter says that Philip will know what they are right away. Connie doesn't care as long as he's with her and not Miss Sanders. Philip gets Conklin involved. The three dig up a bunch of bones and Philip thinks they're worth a lot of money. They break for something to eat and Philip bags up all the bones and puts them in the house. Later, Walter tells Connie that he substituted bones from the museum and has to get them back. Mrs. Davis says she made soup out of bones she found in the house. Walter and Connie panic, but they were soup bones from Mrs. Davis' fridge.
73	4	"Two-Way Stretch Snodgrass"	Al Lewis	Al Lewis & Joseph Quillan	October 29, 1954
Walter wants to join the football team and play with his buddy Stretch. Stretch is the best athlete that Madison High has. Stretch has been having to sleep on the porch as his room is being remodeled. Connie suggests that he stay at his aunt's house, which happens to be half way to Hamilton High. Conklin mentions to Connie that his rival, Principal Jasper Flint (Ray Teal) of Hamilton, will be coming by. He also says that College Football star, Biff Moonie (Walter Coy), is looking for a high school coaching job. Conklin thinks Biff will accept his offer. Jasper arrives and tells Conklin he has signed Biff. Jasper then convinces Stretch to transfer to Hamilton. Stretch thinks him leaving Madison will help his friend Walter get on the team. Stretch tells Conklin and Connie that after school, he's taking Biff to get his parents permission. Connie comes up with a plan. Walter will pretend to be Stretch and bring Biff over to Connie's house. Connie and Conklin will pretend to be Stretch's parents. They tell Biff that they won't let Stretch transfer. Harriet, and then Stretch, come in and ruin the plan. Stretch says that Walter will be on the team and that he doesn't need to transfer for it to happen.
74	5	"Angela's Wedding"	Al Lewis	Al Lewis & Joseph Quillan	November 5, 1954
Connie is surprised to learn that Angela is getting married this Saturday. Angela says the groom's name is Gregory Farnsworth and she's know him for 6 months. But, she's never met him as they have only been corresponding via mail. Mrs. Davis says they're having a reception that afternoon and Connie should invite a few people. She tells Connie that Angela is meeting Gregory is Connie's classroom. Mrs. Davis is also worried because in her first letter, Angela sent Gregory a picture of her from 30 years ago. She hopes that Connie can break it to him that Angela is older. At school, Connie meets Mr. Greeley (Ben Gage), the new coach, and is quite taken by him. She invites him to the reception. Gregory, an elderly looking man, tells Connie that he won't be able to meet Angela for lunch as he has an appointment. Gregory sees the picture of Angela as she is now and thinks she looks great. Both of them leave the classroom. Mr. Greeley comes in and then Angela. Mr. Greeley quickly leaves. Angela thinks that was Gregory and finds him very attractive. Before the reception, Mr. Greeley and Philip meet and instantly do not get along as they both want Connie. Angela meets Gregory, learns who he is and is very happy.
75	6	"Van Gogh, Man Gogh"	Al Lewis	Al Lewis & Joseph Quillan	November 12, 1954
Connie has taken up painting. She tells Mrs. Davis that she read a newspaper article by art dealer Paul Baptiste. He will be visiting the local high schools and award a prize to the most promising artist. At school, Walter is watching over Connie's painting, which is a self portrait, while she went to the supply room. Paul Baptiste arrives and wants to buy the painting. Paul is in a hurry, but Walter takes him to the supply room. Connie comes by, takes the painting and goes to Mr. Boynton's lab. Walter thinks the painting has been stolen. Philip shows Connie his painting of his pet frog. It turns out that Conklin painted a self portrait as well. Harriet tells her father that she overheard Mr. Baptiste say about Connie's painting that he had never seen such a work of art. Baptiste will be at Connie's house that afternoon. Feeling bad he lost her painting, Walter creates a bad imitation and gives it to Connie. Despite it being a horrible painting, but thinking it's the one Baptiste liked, Conklin buys the painting from Connie for $50. Conklin hopes to then sell it to Baptiste. Conklin and Baptiste arrive at Connie's house. Conklin learns the painting he bought was done by Walter. He outbids Baptiste for Connie's painting. Baptiste says he's only interested in the antique frame.
76	7	"The Jewel Robbery"	Al Lewis	Al Lewis & Joseph Quillan	November 26, 1954
An alarm goes off at a jewelry store and the thief leaves the building. Conklin walks by and accidentally breaks the front window of the store with his laundry bag. A woman sees him and he runs off. Mr. Boynton then walks by and looks in the broken window. Connie sees Philip and can't believe what she's seeing. The next morning Connie tells Mrs. Davis she went to the movie alone after Philip broke their date. Mrs. Davis mentions the jewelry theft was in the paper. Also that Conklin has reported that money is being stolen from the school cafeteria cash register. She tells Connie how she accidentally dropped an iron on Philip's head the other night. Connie believes this has caused Philip's criminal actions. At school, Detective Crane comes to see Conklin and arrests him. Connie is there, but doesn't say anything about Philip. Connie is acting principal and dishwasher Mr. Judson turns in his resignation. Detective Crane tells Connie he spoke with Philip and wants to check the suitcase in his lab. Thinking the jewelry is in Philip's suitcase, Connie has a student switch Mr. Judson's suitcase for Philip's. Detective Crane finds the jewelry in the suitcase from the lab. To protect Philip, Connie confesses to the crime. There is some more confusion and Philip and then Mrs. Davis confess. They finally figure out that Judson is the crook.
77	8	"Space, Who Needs It?"	Al Lewis	Al Lewis & Joseph Quillan	December 3, 1954
Connie and Conklin have joined Mr. Boynton's astronomy club. Connie clearly joined to spend more time with Philip. Harriet tells Connie that her father built a homemade telescope. She also says that Conklin believes he discovered a new planet. Conklin is going to hold a press conference the next day to announce it. Walter shows Connie a small mechanical spaceman that his Uncle makes and Walter is trying to sell them. Walter is upset because Conklin made him polish the telescope. To get back at Conklin, Walter placed a BB in the lens and that's what he thinks is the new planet. Conklin wants Connie to come by his house that evening. She will take down notes as he observes the planet. When Philip tells Connie they may have to spend every night studying the new planet, Connie doesn't tell him the truth. Walter tells Connie that he painted the BB red and green. He also added some smaller pieces of buckshot. Conklin tells Connie, Philip and Walter about the colors of his planet and it has moons. He believes there's life on his planet. Conklin now wants Connie at his house every night for several weeks. Walter makes Conklin believe he's sees a flying saucer. Walter then sets out the small mechanical spacemen. Conklin discovers everything was a hoax and Walter was behind it.
78	9	"The Novelist"	Al Lewis	Al Lewis & Joseph Quillan	December 10, 1954
Former student Terence Layton (John Smith), who has become a popular novelist, comes by Connie's house. He's turned into quite a handsome young man. He's doing some research for his new book which will be about his time at Madison High. Terence didn't know that Connie still worked at Madison. There are some unflattering remarks about Conklin that Connie made way back then in the book. Terence tells Connie he'll remove her name from the comments. At school, Mr. Boynton is so engrossed in a book that he doesn't notice Connie and Terence walking by arm in arm. Connie was hoping to make Philip jealous. Conklin learns that Terence will be visiting the school. He remembers Terence as being as smart as Walter Denton. Conklin would like to see Terence's manuscript and see if he's mentioned. Terence and Connie arrive at Conklin's office. Conklin manages to switch folders and gets the manuscript. Conklin wants to report what Connie said about him to Mr. Stone, the Head of the School Board. Terence learns from Harriet that Conklin switched folders and has read the manuscript. Connie finds some unflattering comments Conklin made about Mr. Stone in his folder. This is enough to have Conklin change his mind about turning Connie in.
79	10	"Four Leaf Clover"	Al Lewis	Al Lewis & Joseph Quillan	December 17, 1954
Connie is having some work down on her car, but Mrs. Davis still thinks the car will fall apart. Connie is picking up her car from Sammy Clark's (Sid Melton) service station. She tells Sammy she found a four leaf clover on the way there. Sammy says the bill for the car will be higher than he estimated. While coming out of a novelty store, Connie knocks over a barber shop pole and breaks it. Officer Fletcher sees her and insists she see Paul Morelli (Hy Averback), the owner, about paying for it. Fletcher also gives her a ticket for parking by a fire plug. Plus, one of her tires goes flat. Connie goes to see Morelli but he's not home. Thanks to Connie, Mr. Boynton's perfect punctuality record has been broken. Philip is upset and cancels their date for that evening. Conklin tells Connie that he is to address the State-Wide Principal's Convention. He also mentions that because of her tardiness, Supt. Stone is turning down her promotion. More things continue to go wrong for Connie including accidentally taking Conklin's plane ticket. Connie finally gets to talk to Morelli and Conklin shows up for his ticket. Connie and Conklin have to stay in Morelli's house because of a measles quarantine.
80	11	"The Citizen's League"	Al Lewis	Al Lewis & Joseph Quillan	January 7, 1955
Connie, Philip and the Conklin's return to Connie's house after a Citizen's League meeting. Connie reads aloud a pamphlet that was distributed at the meeting. It states that all good citizens harbor a dark secret that they would be ashamed of if someone found out. The thought weighs heavily on the minds of Connie, Philip and Osgood. Philip and the Conklin's leave quickly, though Martha doesn't know why. They didn't read the part in the pamphlet that said that one shouldn't dwell on the idea as it might just be a little thing. Conklin writes a letter to Martha saying he has to leave because he's a disgrace to the community. But then Harriet tells him something that makes him postpone leaving for a while. Philip and Connie run into each other with suitcases at the bus station. They say a tearful goodbye to each other, but then neither has enough money for bus fare. At school, Walter asks Connie what's bothering everyone. Conklin and Connie admit to each other that they have a secret. Mrs. Dunphy (Marjorie Bennett) comes by and invites them to Mrs. Davis' for some cheering up. That night, Conklin, Connie and Philip admit that their secret stems from a Citizen's League meeting last July 4th. They each tell their stories and feel better for it. Things don't go well when Connie convinces Conklin to confess something to Mrs. Dunphy.
81	12	"Buddy"	Al Lewis	Al Lewis & Joseph Quillan	January 14, 1955
Little Ricky Velasco visits Connie at her house. He asks Connie if she's married Mr. Boynton yet. Ricky's Uncle Alberto is waiting outside so he has to leave. Connie tells Mrs. Davis that the mailman left a letter by mistake. Because Mrs. Davis burned the envelope, Connie doesn't know who sent the letter nor who it was meant for. The letter is to someone's true love and the person threatens to kill someone named Buddy. It also mentions holding hands last Saturday night in the park. At school, Connie shows the letter to Mr. Conklin. Conklin was in the park last Saturday and got into an altercation with a couple and they called him Buddy. Ricky comes by to visit Conklin. Ricky tells Harriet that he is in love with a girl named Audrey who lives near Connie. Ricky's Uncle has a prized bull. To impress Audrey, one day Ricky will kill the bull that Audrey calls Buddy. After Philip sees the letter, he says he got into an altercation with a couple in the park last Saturday and the guy called him Buddy. Both Conklin and Philip take precautions to protect themselves. Conklin finds a note on his desk with an address on it. Connie says the handwriting matches the letter. They don't know that the note was written by Ricky. They decide to confront the person. Connie finds out that it's Ricky that wrote the note and the letter. Connie tells Ricky about what happened to Conklin and Philip in the park. Ricky uses that info to have Philip spend time with Connie as well as keep Osgood away.
82	13	"Noodnick, Daughter of Medic"	Al Lewis	Al Lewis & Joseph Quillan	January 21, 1955
Connie is getting a check-up with Dr. Keller (Dan Tobin) because Supt. Edgar T. Stone is thinking of making her the head of the English Department. Dr. Keller is a little anxious as his wife is expecting a baby soon. Stone has been replacing many of the key positions with women. Dr. Keller gets a call from his wife saying she needs to go to the hospital, so Keller is not able to finish the exam. At school, Conklin tells Harriet he thinks he's being fired after mishearing Connie and Stone. Conklin believes that Connie will get his job. Connie tells Walter she needs to find someone to cover for her second period as she needs to get back to Dr. Keller. Connie tells Mr. Boynton that Dr. Keller is still at the hospital so now she'll need someone to cover her third period. Conklin keeps seeing Connie helping others around the school and worries about her versatility. Connie finally gets to see Keller, but then he has to rush off to the hospital again. Conklin comes by and thinks Connie is also helping the Doctor. Conklin finally confronts Connie about her becoming the Principal. He shows her a copy of a nasty letter he wrote Stone. Connie tells him Stone was talking about her English Department promotion. Stone comes by Conklin's office. Connie finds a way for Conklin to keep his job and get a bonus. But because of all her running back and forth to Dr. Keller's, her blood pressure was too high and she won't get her promotion.
83	14	"The Stuffed Gopher"	Al Lewis	Al Lewis & Joseph Quillan	January 28, 1955
Connie tells Mrs. Davis that some days ago a gopher escaped from Mr. Boynton's lab. It's burrowing holes all over the campus. Conklin wants the gopher caught. Conklin comes by and says that because Connie left a door open at school, vandals got in and wreck the school. The damage is estimated at 3 to 4 thousand dollars. When Philip says he's glad that his lab will be remodeled, Connie asks if he had anything to do with the vandalism. Connie then wonders if Conklin had anything to do with it so his office would be remodeled. Stretch Snodgrass shows Connie and Walter a stuffed gopher that he wants to give to Conklin. It turns out that Stretch did all the damage in the school trying to catch the gopher. They decide that they have to help Stretch not get into trouble. By stroking Conklin's ego, Connie and Walter talk him into having the students clean the school up. This will stop Supt. Stone from launching an investigation into who the vandal's are and make Conklin look good. Conklin injures himself working hard to help clean. Conklin learns that Stone pushed through an appropriation to remodel the damaged rooms.
84	15	"Safari O'Toole"	Al Lewis	Al Lewis & Joseph Quillan	February 4, 1955
Connie is in Mr. Fischer's (Frank Nelson) Pawn Shop wanting to get back one of Mrs. Davis' rings. The ring was given to her by old friend Safari O'Toole (Burt Mustin), a big game hunter. Safari called Connie and told her he'll be coming by to celebrate Mrs. Davis' birthday that day. Conklin also visits Fischer's store to get a birthday gift for Mrs. Davis. He was bilked out of $100 by an old acquaintance. Connie borrows some money from Walter so she can buy lunch for Safari. Connie had Mr. Boynton fix Mrs. Davis' ring and somehow it went missing. Safari joins Connie and Philip in the school cafeteria. Safari confesses to never having been a big game hunter. He lived the lie to impress Mrs. Davis. Safari is really just a dog catcher. Connie and Philip agree not to tell Mrs. Davis. Safari comes over that evening and surprises Mrs. Davis. Safari gives Margaret a ring identical to the one he had given her years ago. Safari explains to Connie how he found it in Philip's lab and left some money for it. Conklin and Philip arrive and give Margaret gifts that they got from the Pawn Shop that actually already belonged to her.
85	16	"The Weighing Machine"	Al Lewis	Al Lewis & Joseph Quillan	February 11, 1955
Connie is going to use a weight machine outside of a store. But before she does, she removes her shoes and a jacket. Officer Jack Hurley (Edward Gargan) comes by and they have a conversation about what she's doing. Connie puts a penny in the machine, but nothing happens and she doesn't get her penny back. Mrs. Davis comes out of the store and tells Connie she should complain to the company that owns the machine. Connie calls the company but they hang up on her. Mr. Boyton says she is fighting for a cause and should call them back. Connie gets through to Mr. Crocket, the president of the Busy Bee Weight Machine Company. Mr. Crocket says the machine works fine and won't refund her money. Walter brings the weight machine to school so the company can't fix it behind their backs. Harriet tells Connie that her father found out about the machine and that she lost her penny. Conklin believes in Connie's cause. Harriet also tells Connie that a rumor is spreading among the students that she's broke. Some have begun raising funds for her. Connie is very moved by their thoughtfulness. Connie and Officer Hurley bring the machine to Crocket's office. It turns out that Connie put a slug, not a penny, in the machine.
86	17	"Public Speaker's Nightmare"	Al Lewis	Al Lewis & Joseph Quillan	February 18, 1955
Conklin tells Connie, Walter and Harriet that Madison will be visited by two officials of the U.S. Office of Education. Conklin wants to have a reception for them. As they are busy, Walter says he could tape record a song by the Glee Club and play that. Conklin is to give a welcoming speech. Thanks to a book on public speaking that Connie gave him, Conklin starts to panic about his speech. Conklin panics even more when one of the officials, Mrs. Ferguson, calls to speak with him. Connie takes a message and learns that Mrs. Ferguson (Gail Bonney) and Mr. Fogarty (Earle Ross) are very high officials of the Office. When he learns how terrified Conklin is of doing badly with his speech, Mr. Boyton suggests to Connie that they record it ahead of time. Conklin would then Lip-sync to the recording when in front of the officials. Conklin likes the idea. Later, Walter causes a split in the tape and asks Stretch to repair it. Mrs. Ferguson and Mr. Fogarty arrive and Conklin starts to give his speech. Stretch's repair job didn't go well and speech is a garbled mess.
87	18	"The Auction"	Al Lewis	Al Lewis & Joseph Quillan	February 25, 1955
Madison high is helping the Chamber of Commerce raise funds for bigger and better playgrounds. The school will hold a charity auction in the gym that afternoon. Conklin wants suggestions as to how to get a large crowd to show up. Connie says that they don't have enough items to sell. Walter suggests contacting Mr. Jessop, a philanthropist in the area. Conklin tells Connie she's in charge of auctioning the items. Harriet tells Connie that her father would've donated something but they traded in all their old furniture for new stuff that will go into their new house. Connie almost sells Mr. Boynton something that Conklin had just bought. Conklin wants Stretch to deliver something to his new house and writes down the address. Walter tells Stretch that Mr. Jessop has agreed to donate the contents of a house that's being torn down to the auction. Walter writes down the address and wants Stretch to make sure the contents are picked up. Stretch winds up confusing the addresses. Conklin learns it is his furnishings being sold at the auction.
88	19	"The Mambo"	Al Lewis	Al Lewis & Joseph Quillan	March 4, 1955
Mrs. Davis mentions to Connie and Mr. Boynton that her and Mrs. Conklin met a man named Orville Mason at the Ladies Auxiliary. He was an MP during the war, but is having a hard time finding a job. At school, Conklin tells Connie that he learned the Madison kids are hanging out at Elmer's (Jerry Hausner) Malt Shop dancing instead of doing homework. Conklin has been given the authority to hire a truant officer to keep track of the kids. Conklin says that he wants to hire Orville Mason. He also tells Connie that any student that fails to turn in their homework will have to meet with her during lunch. Plus they'll be given a dunce cap. Walter and Stretch have to meet with Connie and wear the caps. Walter tells Connie that a lot of the kids go to Elmer's to get dance lessons from a guy named Orville Mason. Harriet suggests that Connie go to Elmer's to make sure what Walter said was true. She'd hate to have her mother embarrassed for recommending Orville. Conklin tells Connie he spent a lot of time convincing Supt. Stone to hire Orville. Connie goes to Elmer's and winds up having a wild dance with Orville. Walter and Stretch show up and get the same treatment with some of the other kids. Conklin arrives dressed as a student and also gets trapped into a wild dance. Then Philip and Mrs. Davis, dressed as teenagers, come in. Orville goes across the street to the Ladies Auxiliary. The police raid the Auxiliary for disturbing the peace and Mrs. Conklin is arrested. At school, Conklin meets Orville and learns MP stood for Mambo Professor.
89	20	"The Dream"	Al Lewis	Al Lewis & Joseph Quillan	March 11, 1955
It's almost Saturday afternoon and Mrs. Davis finds Connie napping in a chair. Connie tells Mrs. Davis that she stayed up very late reading a book call "Maternity Ward". Harriet comes by and tells Connie that Walter proposed to her. Harriet also says that she's going to be a bridesmaid for her father's cousin George's wedding later that day. Mrs. Davis tells Connie about an item in the paper that mentioned how many babies were born in the country. Connie takes a long nap on the sofa and dreams of her future along with her friends. Her and Philip have been married for five years. Connie tells Philip that she will have a baby soon. Connie tells Conklin the good news and he gives her a large amount of money. Conklin mentions that his wife is expecting. Walter has been married to Harriet for three years but still hasn't graduated high school. Harriet has had two sets of twins and is expecting a fifth child. Connie has her baby and Harriet winds up having triplets. Conklin's wife has a little boy. Connie and Philip are now married for 25 years. Connie tells Philip that Walter has finally graduated high school. Connie and Philip are worried about their daughter Cleo dating Osgood Conklin, Jr. Philip learns that Cleo and Osgood Conklin, Jr. have been secretly married for two years. They present Philip with their baby. Connie wakes up from her dream.
90	21	"The Return of Red Smith"	Al Lewis	Al Lewis & Joseph Quillan	March 25, 1955
Mrs. Davis tells Connie she's received a letter from ex-boyfriend Red Smith (Ian Wolfe). Her and Red were once engaged, but his parents prevented the marriage because Margaret wasn't on their social level. They made a packed to meet 25 years in the future. It's now been 40 years and he's finally showing up for a visit. To get back at his family, Mrs. Davis wrote to him that she is very wealthy. Red arrives at the house and Connie pretends to be Margaret's social secretary. Connie tells him that Margaret is very busy and won't be around until that evening. At school, Conklin reminds Connie that Mrs. Davis had days ago invited him for dinner that evening. Walter tells Connie that Mrs. Davis learned that her living room furniture is about to be repossessed. Connie needs to find a way to get some money. It's dinner time and Mrs. Davis' furniture has not been taken yet. Red shows up and then the men for the furniture. Connie says the furniture is being given to the needy. To add to the confusion, Philip and Conklin show up. Margaret gets a telegram from Red Smith saying he can't make the visit. The Red Smith that they thought was Margaret's ex-boyfriend is actually from the phone company. He's there because of past due bills.
91	22	"Le chien chaud et le mouton noir"	Al Lewis	Al Lewis & Joseph Quillan	April 8, 1955
Connie is looking for a part-time job. She finds a job as a receptionist. Even though the hours are late into the night, she calls Paul de Chand (Philip Van Zandt). At school, Conklin tells Harriet that he bought a business from Paul de Chand, who promised that he'd hire a receptionist. Conklin says that he doesn't want Supt. Stone (Joseph Kearns) to find out about it. Despite the business' name being in French, it's basically a hot dog stand. And the receptionist will be greeting customers while cooking the food. Supt. Stone comes by and he is not happy. He tells Connie and Conklin that he found out that one of the other teachers has taken on an extra job. It's not the job that bothers him, it's the late hours. As he's leaving, Stone runs into Mrs. Davis. She tells him about Connie's job and the hours. Connie arrives at the job and meets Paul de Chand. She is stunned to find it's just a hot dog stand. Conklin arrives just as Paul is leaving. What Conklin doesn't know is that because of a detour, there hasn't been a customer in months. Philip comes by to wish Connie luck and is also surprised by the place. Conklin finds out Connie is his employee. It gets worse when Stone walks in.
92	23	"Kritch Cave"	Al Lewis	Al Lewis & Joseph Quillan	April 15, 1955
Kritch Canyon, where local landmark Kritch Cave is located, is being sold. Connie, Walter, and Philip visit the cave to reminisce. Apparently Conklin is very upset that the property, which is right next to the school, will be sold for so little money. Because Connie was once involved in a real estate transaction, Conklin wants her to try and get more money for the land. Connie and Walter go to the Hall of Records to see Mr. Maynard (Parley Baer) and get the deeds to the canyon. Maynard is briefly out of his office. Connie and Walter find a binder with deeds in them on the desk. Because they are in a hurry, Connie and Walter take the set of deeds and will let Mr. Maynard know later. What she doesn't know is that they are deeds to the land the school is on. Conklin arrives at Maynard's office. Conklin tells Maynard that Supt. Stone doesn't want anyone to get involved with the sale of Kritch Canyon and to not give Connie the deeds. Harriet tells Conklin that Connie has been selling the deeds and getting a lot of money for them. Maynard comes by and tells Conklin that Connie mistakenly took the deeds to the school land. Conklin tells Connie what she did and she goes to hide in the cave. Mrs. Davis comes to the rescue as all the people that bought the deeds were friends of hers.
93	24	"Mister Fargo's Whiskers"	Al Lewis	Al Lewis & Joseph Quillan	April 22, 1955
Connie is called to the school on a Saturday. Harriet explains that Mr. Fargo (John Carradine), the new Inspector of Schools, will be arriving on Monday. Conklin wants to get the school prepared. Harriet also mentions that Walter really liked her new hairstyle. Harriet suggests that Connie do the same to reignite her relationship with Philip. Connie does change her hair and she gets upset when Philip doesn't even notice. Connie then puts on a black wig and Philip doesn't say anything. Conklin thinks Connie's trying to draw attention to herself. Concerned about the visit by Fargo, Conklin hopes to make sure Connie isn't around on Monday. Philip thinks they should make themselves look silly and then maybe Connie would realize how ridiculous she looks. Connie comes in with another wig and they pretend to not notice. Conklin tells her to take Monday off, but she insists on being at school. Philip and Conklin dress strangely and Connie pretends to not notice. She says she's staying. Connie overhears the men saying that Walter is going to disguise himself and pretend to be Fargo. He will tell Connie to take some time off. The real Mr. Fargo shows up a day early and is in Conklin's office. Conklin arrives and thinks it's Walter. Connie comes by and also thinking it's Walter, she pulls on Fargo's beard. Walter then comes in the office. Connie runs out.
94	25	"The Great Baseball Slide"	Al Lewis	Al Lewis & Joseph Quillan	April 29, 1955
Connie is tired and sore after Conklin had her fill in for the coach of the girls' softball team. Connie learns from Stretch that Walter is lending him money, clothes and his car. Walter tells Connie that he's just being Stretch's manager. Walter hopes to get a percentage if the baseball scout that is in town to watch Stretch play actually signs him. Walter finds a way to get Connie to invest some money in Stretch. Connie learns that Mr. Boynton and Conklin invested money as well. Stretch asks Conklin if he could leave school early to see a doctor. His pitching arm doesn't feel right and he won't be able to play in the game the next day. Connie comes up with the idea that Philip and Conklin should pretend to scouting agents interested in Stretch. She'll pretend to be Stretch's sister. Then maybe the actual baseball representative will still sign Stretch without seeing him play. Mr. Ward from the White Sox comes by Connie's house. Philip and Conklin show up and place bids for Stretch. Stretch shows up and almost ruins everything. Philip and Conklin keep biding against each other with Ward not saying anything. Apparently Ward saw Connie playing with girls' softball team and wants to bid on her.
95	26	"Turnabout Day"	Al Lewis	Al Lewis & Joseph Quillan	May 6, 1955
Connie tells Mrs. Davis that today is "Turnabout Day" at school. The students and teachers will swap roles. This was all Walter's idea. Despite Walter getting enough signatures to present the idea to Supt. Stone, Conklin was against it. But then Conklin got a letter from Stone endorsing the idea. Connie learns from Stretch that Walter made himself the Principal. Stretch is in a dress because he's going to be an English teacher. Connie finds a way to get even with Conklin for making her move a lot of school furniture the previous day. Walter tells Connie that he forged Stone's letter of official approval. Because Walter will let Connie spend the day with Mr. Boynton, she won't reveal his secret. As it's Friday, Philip would like to take Connie up to a lodge for the weekend. But they're both short of funds for transportation. With everyone's approval, Principal Denton dismisses school 3 hours early. Supt. Stone shows up and wonders why all the students are leaving. Stone tells Conklin that he didn't write an approval letter for Turnabout Day. Connie finds a way to make Stone believe that he did write the letter. Under the guise that he needs some rest, Connie also gets Stone to drive her and Philip to the lodge.
96	27	"Here Is Your Past"	Al Lewis	Al Lewis & Joseph Quillan	May 13, 1955
Connie goes to see Mr. Clary (Hy Averback) the Butcher. She found a little dog in her yard and wondered if Mr. Clary would like him. Connie sees a man outside the store and tells Clary that the man has been following her around. Clary complains that Mrs. Davis is 2 months behind on her bill. Connie is at school and asks Walter if he would like the dog. The man that has been following Connie takes an article Walter wrote about her out of his pocket. The man then takes Mr. Boynton's dairy. Conklin hurt his ribs because he's been sneezing so much. Apparently he's allergic to certain animals. The man takes something about Connie from Conklin's desk. Connie shows Conklin the dog and he starts sneezing, thus causing him to throw out his arm. Philip and Walter accuse Connie of taking their missing items. The man comes by Connie's classroom and tells her to come with him. The man turns out to be a Mr. Jason (Philip Van Zandt) and Connie winds up on the television program "Here is your Past". Jeff Cartwright, the host, discusses some of her life. Philip, Walter and Mr. Clary are brought out and they're still mad at her. Conklin and the puppy are brought out and Conklin starts sneezing.
97	28	"Madison Mascot"	Al Lewis	Al Lewis & Joseph Quillan	May 20, 1955
Mr. Conklin holds a meeting with Walter, Stretch, Harriet, Connie and Mr. Boynton. Madison will be playing a big game with Hamilton High the next day. Conklin mentions that Jasper Flint, principal of Hamilton, is his arch rival. Flint has acquired a live bear cub for his team's mascot. Conklin wants to change their teams name to match a new mascot they would get. Later, Conklin tells Harriet that he's decided that a gopher will be their mascot. Martha Conklin calls and tells Osgood that she broke his elephant bookend. Conklin writes a note to Connie to purchase another bookend. Stretch is to deliver the note to Connie. Due to Stretch tearing the note, Connie believes Conklin wants an elephant for the mascot. Connie and Philip go to see Mike (William Newell) and Dan Beck (Jack Kruschen) at the circus. The Beck's would let Madison have an elephant for free, but they would have to keep it until the circus returned next season. Connie calls Conklin and because he thinks they're talking about a bookend, he tells her to bring the elephant to his house. At the Conklin house, Connie finds out about the bookend and Osgood finds out about the elephant.
98	29	"The Big Jump"	Al Lewis	Al Lewis & Joseph Quillan	May 27, 1955
Mr. Boynton and Connie discuss how Conklin will jump from the top of the high school into a fireman's net that afternoon. He's doing it as a publicity stunt. Connie gets upset when Philip says that men are just braver than women. At school, Conklin tells Harriet that he changed his mind and will not jump. When Connie comes by, Conklin fakes an injury. He suggests that maybe Philip or one of the other male teachers take his place. Suddenly Philip and all the others come down with mysterious maladies. Conklin wants Connie to make the jump. She'll wear a crash helmet and a paratroopers outfit so no one will know it's her. Conklin, while wearing the same outfit, will then pose for the newspaper pictures. Walter tells Connie she should pay Mr. Faylen (Jerry Hausner), a local circus acrobat, to make the jump. Connie is all dressed up and on the roof. Mr. Faylen is there but tells Connie he has a fear of heights. Conklin and Philip show up and Connie says she won't jump. Walter arrives and says the stairs to the roof are on fire. Conklin, Faylen and then Philip jump off the roof. Walter tells Connie there is no real fire, he just started a smudge pot.
99	30	"Home Cooked Meal"	Al Lewis	Al Lewis & Joseph Quillan	June 3, 1955
Harriet doesn't think her father should store their personal meats in the school's freezer. Before he can put the meats away, Connie and Walter come by. After a brief conversation, Harriet, Walter and Connie leave. Conklin goes into the freezer. Connie comes back and sees the freezer door open. Not knowing Conklin is in there, she closes the door. Connie complains to Walter that Miss Daisy Enright (Mary Jane Croft) has been doing a lot of domestic chores for Mr. Boynton. Daisy is hoping to gain Philip's affections. Walter tells Connie she should be the first one to cook a meal for Philip on his new stove. Connie runs into Philip and Daisy and the two ladies start insulting each other. Walter learns that Conklin is in the freezer and Connie lets him out. Conklin is covered in frost. Conklin is due for a physical exam for a special school position, but now has a cold. As she doesn't know how to cook, Connie sneaks Mrs. Davis over to Philip's to prepare the meal. The kitchen light bulb burns out. Philip didn't install the oven completely and now there's a gas leak. Connie and Philip leave briefly and Conklin comes by to pick up a tool box. Because of his cold, he can't smell the gas. He lights a match to look in the kitchen and there is a small explosion. Connie and Philip return to find Conklin covered in food.

=== Season 4 (1955–56) ===
No. overall	No. in season	Title	Directed by	Written by	Original release date
100	1	"The Blind Date"	Al Lewis	Al Lewis & Joseph Quillan	October 7, 1955
Mrs. Davis tells Conklin that she ran into his old flame, Lulu May Calhoon. When Conklin hears that she's in town, he's worried she's still interested in him. She actually told Mrs. Davis she wants nothing to do with Conklin. Connie and Philip are on the outs to the extent of returning past gifts. Connie has a blind date for that evening. They are to meet at the wishing well. Philip calls Mrs. Davis and mentions that he has a blind date that night. He's meeting her at the wishing well. Walter tells Harriet that he disguised his voice as Mr. McNulty of the School Board and set both Philip and Connie up to think they have blind dates. Walter believes this will bring them back together. Connie and Philip meet to return their gifts and they are very cold to each other. Conklin wants Connie to do some typing at his house that evening. She tries to tell him she has a date. Philip insisted to Walter that he speak with his date before tonight. Walter has Harriet disguise her voice and call Philip in Conklin's office. Conklin picks up the phone and thinks it's Lulu May wanting to meet up with him that evening at the wishing well. Connie and Philip meet each other at the wishing well. They figure out that Walter is behind this and they make up. Philip goes to get something out of his car. Conklin comes by and runs into Connie. Connie finds a way to have Conklin not need her to type for him. And it involves her telling him she'll get rid of Lulu May. Note: This episode was obviously postponed from season three. It has nothing to do with the new format of season four.
101	2	"Transition Show"	Al Lewis	Joseph Quillan	October 14, 1955
Madison High is demolished to complete a new freeway. The students will be sent to Monroe High along with half the teaching staff. The other half will be given severance pay and will have to seek other employment. Connie is one of the teachers that has to find another job. On her way to say goodbye to Conklin, Connie has a confrontation with a woman in the hallway. Connie and Conklin do not have kind words for each other. Back at home, Mrs. Davis mentions that Mr. Boynton transferred to Monroe High. Connie says she'll probably never see him again. Connie gets a letter saying she can have a job at Mrs. Wynona Nestor's (Nana Bryant) elementary school. At the school, Miss Hannibal tells Connie she'll be the dramatics coach and English teacher. Connie then meets Clint Allbright (William Ching), the Gym Instructor. Clint is clearly attracted to Connie. Mrs. Nestor, who happens to be the woman Connie had the confrontation with, tells Miss Hannibal that she got Conklin to be their Principal. Connie meets Oliver Munsey (Bob Sweeney), the Vice-Principal. Oliver is an amateur inventor and Mrs. Nestor's brother. Connie learns Conklin is the Principal. Conklin doesn't have a good introduction to Oliver. But changes his mind about Oliver when he learns he's Mrs. Nestor's brother. Connie then meets Mrs. Nestor and knows she's in for trouble.
102	3	"Who's Who?"	Al Lewis	Joseph Quillan	October 21, 1955
At her new school, young student Benny Romero tells Connie that he doesn't like her. Apparently Connie replaced teacher Miss Montoya who just got married and is leaving on her honeymoon. Benny was quite fond of Miss Montoya. Connie tells Benny that when she transferred to this school she lost many of her old friends. But she still has her landlady, Mrs. Davis. Despite Connie doing a favor for Benny, he says he still can't like her. Connie tells Mr. Munsey that Clint Allbright is still making passes at her. Mrs. Nestor tells Connie that she will speak to her after lunch about her being late to school twice this week. Mrs. Nestor informs Connie that all teachers need to live near by the school in the Valley. That means Connie will have to leave Mrs. Davis' house in Hollywood. Benny and Oliver overheard the conversation and now feel bad for Connie. They tell her that though she'll be losing Mrs. Davis, she'll gain them as friends. Mrs. Davis will have her sister Angela put Connie up until she can find a permanent place to live. While Connie is packing, Clint shows up and gives Connie a passionate kiss which she actually enjoyed.
103	4	"Burnt Picnic Basket"	Al Lewis	Joseph Quillan	October 28, 1955
Connie has moved into Mrs. Davis' sister Angela Devon's (Jesslyn Fax) home. Connie tells Angela that Mr. Munsey has asked her to help with his pet project, the school picnic. At school, Oliver tells Connie that he has to sneak a cigarette once in a while because of his sister's no smoking rule. He shows Connie some of the fireworks he's made that look like ordinary things. Conklin wants Connie to help Mr. Allbright with the picnic baskets. Conklin then tells Oliver that Mrs. Nestor has given him control of the picnic. Oliver is to stay behind to do some painting at the school. Conklin is also moving the picnic from 10am to 3pm. Oliver gives Conklin one of his fire crackers that looks like a cigar. While working on the picnic baskets, Clint makes advances towards Connie. Because of a misplaced sign, Connie puts most of the baskets in the school incinerator. Conklin wants to see the baskets and Connie and Oliver have to try and make him think they are all there. There is no more food in the kitchen, so they put bricks in some other baskets. Conklin puts them in the mislabeled incinerator. Thinking he ruined the picnic, Conklin will moved the date. Connie won't tell Mrs. Nestor what happened if Conklin puts Oliver back in charge. Conklin also has another incident with Oliver's fireworks.
104	5	"Big Ears"	John Rich	Joseph Quillan	November 4, 1955
Connie mentions to Angela that Ruth Nestor (Isabel Randolph) has taken over for her sister Wynona at the school. Angela is predicting Connie's future with her cards and says she will come into $5. She predicts that big ears are going to cause Connie a lot of trouble. Angela also says that there will be a black cat and Connie will break a mirror. Just then, Connie swats at a fly and breaks the mirror on the wall. And there's a black cat outside the front door. At school, Conklin pays Connie $5 for tickets she bought for Mrs. Conklin and Harriet. Connie tells Oliver what happened and they try and figure out what big ears might be. Just then, little Douglas comes in with a present for Connie. It turns out to be a rabbit. Trouble starts for Connie when she breaks a lamp that Ruth just bought. Connie writes her a check for the lamp, but she has to get to the bank to put the money in. Connie brings the rabbit back to the school warehouse and finds Clint and a bunch of other rabbits there. Ruth tells Clint that she's arranged for a pet shop to take all the rabbits. Between Connie, Conklin, Clint and Oliver, there is some confusion about gathering all the rabbits.
105	6	"Have Bed – Will Travel"	John Rich	Joseph Quillan	November 11, 1955
Connie worries about Mrs. Davis living alone and would like to have her move in with her and Angela. Both Margaret and Angela are becoming quite absent minded. While Connie is on the phone with her, little Benny Romero comes by. Connie knows that Conklin has some furniture in his garage and asks him about a bed. His house is being painted and he'll give Connie two beds if she's put him up as well. Mr. Munsey suggests that Connie have Mrs. Davis stay the weekend. Then she'll get used to being there and wind up staying permanently. Connie calls Mrs. Davis and lies to her that Angela isn't feeling well and could use her help. Connie speaks to Dr. Bedford. He says he's looked at Mrs. Davis' lab report and it's just a matter of time. Connie goes to pick up Margaret who tells Connie that she left everything to her in her will. Dr. Bedford tells Nurse Dooley (Sandra Gould) that the lab reports got mixed up and Mrs. Davis will live a long time. Connie and Margaret arrive at Angela's house and Benny tells Connie Angela really is sick. Angela whispers to Connie that she's fine. Dr. Bedford calls and tells Margaret that she's perfectly healthy.
106	7	"Protest Meeting"	John Rich	Joseph Quillan	November 18, 1955
Conklin posts a new set of strict rules for the teaching staff. Mr. Munsey shows Connie a witch statue he made for the school play of The Wizard of Oz. Connie shows Oliver the new rules and says they need to do something about it. Connie goes to speak with Mrs. Nestor, but she says she agrees with them. Connie tells Oliver that she got nowhere with Ruth. Mr. Hobart (Don Beddoe), the History teacher, comes by and says many of the teachers are complaining about the rules. They decide to hold a protest meeting during lunch at Connie's house. Hobart, Oliver and Connie are at her house. The other teachers were coming on a school bus. Turns out Hobart gave the driver, his wife, a wrong address. The teachers won't get back to school in time to give their exams. Back at school, Benny tells Connie and Oliver that when the teachers didn't show up, all the students left. Mrs. Nestor tells Oliver to assemble all the teachers in the faculty room to go over the new rules. Connie learns from Hobart that the bus is stuck and won't make it back. Connie and Oliver are in the faculty room with all the statues that Oliver made. Ruth comes in and her glasses get broken. She can't see well without them and thinks the statues are the teachers. Conklin comes by and the truth comes out.
107	8	"The King and Brooks"	John Rich	John L. Greene & Joseph Quillan	November 25, 1955
Ramgar, a new student from India, is quite fond of Connie and gives her earrings as a present. Ramgar will be returning to India and his father, Kran, Maharajah of Boongadhi (Hy Averback), would like to meet Connie. A messenger from Kran brings Connie a gift and it's a gold diamond bracelet. The messenger comes by again and gives Connie a pearl necklace. Kran arrives at Connie's classroom. He would like Connie to come to India and be both a teacher and mother to Ramgar. Kran mentions the riches that she will receive, but he'll need her answer by 1 o'clock that day. Connie speaks to Mrs. Davis and Oliver about the offer. She's not sure she wants to leave her friends. Ramgar begs Connie to go and Benny begs her to stay. Mrs. Davis accidentally put a sedative in Connie's coffee. Connie dreams she's in Kran's palace and there is a Harem Dancer (Sylvia Lewis). Connie is in a beautiful outfit and is carried in by servants. She wants to stay there, but she keeps hearing Benny's voice. The Royal Physician, who looks like Oliver, comes to help Connie. Dancing girls arrive and one is Mrs. Davis. The leader of the harem comes in and it's Conklin. Desi Arnaz enters and says that Benny sent him and wants her to come home. Connie wakes up and decides to stay with her friends.
108	9	"Mad Man Munsey"	John Rich	Arthur Alsberg & Joseph Quillan	December 2, 1955
Mr. Munsey has sent some flowers to Connie and they've gone out a couple times. A woman named Barbara comes to Mrs. Davis' house and tells Connie to stay away from Oliver as she is in love with him. At school, Connie would like Benny to snoop around and try to find out what Conklin's "Project X" is. Suddenly Conklin's voice fills the classroom. He tells Connie that he has installed an intercom system throughout the school. Conklin can hear everything that goes on in the school. Then a beautiful woman enters the classroom. She says she is Tina Bradley and she wants Connie to stay away from Oliver. Meanwhile, Mrs. Nestor tells Conklin that her brother Oliver has been seeing too much of Connie and she wants it stopped. The two women that confronted Connie come in and Ruth pays them for their help. When Connie mentions Barbara and Tina, Oliver says he doesn't know them. Oliver believes his sister is behind this. If Oliver should marry first, he would gain controlling interest in the school. Knowing that Conklin and Ruth are eavesdropping, Connie and Oliver stage a love scene for them to hear. Thinking they will be his boss, Conklin is now very friendly to Oliver and Connie. Ruth comes in and claims that Grandfather Munsey (Burt Mustin) is her fiancé to fool Conklin.
109	10	"Connie and Bonnie"	John Rich	John L. Greene & Joseph Quillan	December 9, 1955
Connie tells Mrs. Davis that she was arrested last night in a gambling raid. There's an article about it in the paper. Fortunately there's a typographical error and she is referred to as Bonnie Brooks. Connie stopped at a roadside place for something to eat. When she went to what she thought was the powder room, she walked into the gambling den. The police believed her story and let her go. At school, Conklin tells Connie that his sister Adelaide is in town and staying with him. Conklin has been miserable with her around. If she could find a teaching job, she would leave. Mrs. Nestor calls Conklin and tells him about the article in the paper. Despite it listing a Bonnie Brooks, the address is the same as Connie's. Connie tells Mr. Munsey what happened. Oliver says Connie should claim that Bonnie is her ne'er-do-well twin sister. Oliver can doctor a picture to show the two Brook's sisters together. Connie tells Ruth and Conklin about Bonnie. Conklin doesn't believe her and wants to meet Bonnie or Connie will be fired and Adelaide will get her job. With the help of a trick door and her friends, Connie manages to be both Bonnie and Connie.
110	11	"Music Box Revue"	John Rich	Joseph Quillan	December 23, 1955
Mrs. Davis and Angela are decorating the Christmas tree. Connie doesn't seem to be in the holiday spirit. Connie mentions that the school is putting on a Christmas pageant. A young boy, who says he's Santa's helper, comes to the door selling holiday gifts. Connie is sold four magic music boxes. Only people that have the Christmas spirit can hear the music. Connie can't hear the music but Mrs. Davis and Angela can. Connie gets a call from Mr. Boynton and he would like to come by on Christmas Eve. Connie is very excited and can now hear the music. Connie visits Conklin, who is upset that he's been cast as Scrooge in the pageant. Connie gives him one of the music boxes and he doesn't hear the music. At school, Benny mentions that he is going back to Mexico that night for Christmas and will see old friends. They are listening to the music box and Mr. Munsey walks in and he can't hear the music. Oliver got a telegram from Benny's father who won't be able to pick Benny up until the next night. Connie would like to bring Benny to her house but Mrs. Nestor says because of legalities, he must stay at school. After another talk with the young boy, Connie gives up her date with Philip and goes to be with Benny at school. Ruth and Oliver come by as well. Conklin comes in dressed as Santa.
111	12	"The New Gym Instructor"	John Rich	Arthur Alsberg & Joseph Quillan	December 30, 1955
Connie is worried about who Mrs. Nestor is going to pick as the new athletic director. She still remembers the old one, Clint Allbright, and how he used to make advances toward her. Mrs. Davis says she has the perfect man for Connie. Connie doesn't want to be set up. The Laundry Man (Peter Leeds) comes to the house. Connie thinks he is the man that Mrs. Davis was talking about. She says she won't go out with him and makes him leave. Mrs. Davis tells her who the man was. At school, Mr. Munsey introduces Parker Clemens (Arthur Q. Bryan) to Connie. He is a candidate for athletic director. Connie then runs into handsome Gene Talbot (Gene Barry). He immediately starts flirting with her. Gene is the other candidate. Mrs. Nestor wants Connie to pick the new director. Conklin, Oliver and Mrs. Nestor each bring Connie lunch in hopes of influencing her decision. Oliver would like Parker and Ruth would like Gene. Despite being very qualified and a gentle man, Connie doesn't choose Parker. Gene has absolutely no experience, but Connie hires him anyway. It turns out that Gene is also the man that Mrs. Davis wanted Connie to meet.
112	13	"The Skeleton in the Closet"	John Rich	Arthur Alsberg & Joseph Quillan	January 6, 1956
Connie gets a phone call from a man named Charlie Davenport (Larry J. Blake) and he's demanding $100. Connie is being blackmailed for something that happened years ago. If he doesn't get the money, Charlie says he'll go to Conklin. At school, Connie talks to Mr. Talbot and Mr. Munsey about Charlie. They want to know what she did when she was 18 that was so bad. Connie says that she took a drive with Charlie back then and it turns out he was driving a stolen car. The police arrested them. Once a year now, Charlie demands money from her. Oliver will keep Conklin busy while Connie and Gene confront Charlie. Charlie arrives at Conklin's office to find Connie there. Gene is hiding in the closet and hits Charlie over the head, knocking him out. They hide Charlie in the closet and then Conklin shows up. Conklin says he was to meet a man named Charlie. Connie and Gene tell Phil Waddley (Herb Vigran) about Charlie being in the closet. Phil has knowledge that Conklin was a hoarder during the war and was buying from the black market. Things get complicated when Phil and Connie confront Conklin. And it turns out Charlie was the man that Conklin bought black market things from.
113	14	"Amalgamation"	John Rich	Arthur Alsberg & Joseph Quillan	January 13, 1956
Mr. Munsey calls Connie and tells her that Mrs. Nestor is going to merge her school with Mrs. Pryor's (Eleanor Audley) Professional school. The teacher's will have double the work load for the same amount of money. Oliver thinks it would be smart for Connie to resign. Mrs. Davis doesn't think Connie should quit. After another talk with Oliver, Connie decides to quit. Conklin tells Connie that, as per her agreement, if she quits, she can't get another teaching job. Mrs. Nestor tells Conklin and Connie that they will be student supervisors and will work "hand in hand". Conklin and Connie are not thrilled. Mrs. Pryor informs the two that her students are aspiring actors. Connie and Conklin soon find that the students are over privileged little brats. Once Mrs. Nestor learns about the spoiled students, she wants the contract between the schools broken. Connie comes up with a plan to act as outrageously obnoxious as Mrs. Pryor's students. Connie invites Mrs. Pryor to a Progressive Teachers night at Mrs. Pryor's house. Conklin, Connie, Mrs. Davis, Oliver and Gene all arrive in outlandish costumes and proceed to make a mess of Mrs. Pryor's house. To their surprise, Mrs. Pryor likes the way they are acting and wants to extend the contract. They learn that Mrs. Pryor hates vaudeville. They all change into vaudevillian costumes and do some slapstick routines. Mrs. Pryor tears up the contract.
114	15	"Reunion"	John Rich	Arthur Alsberg & Joseph Quillan	January 20, 1956
Two of Connie's old friends, Gladys and Ellen (Shirley Mitchell), are coming for a visit. Connie hasn't seen them in 10 years. Ellen arrives and tells Connie about her husband and son and how she envies Connie being single. Gladys comes by and she is married and has two children. Both are surprised that Connie is just a teacher. They say Connie will never meet a man in that profession. The next day, Connie tells Mrs. Davis that her only choices for a man at school are Conklin, Oliver and Gene. At school, Oliver tells Connie that he doesn't think changing jobs will help her get a man. Connie fantasizes about working at a theatrical agency and she has no luck getting a man there. Conklin, Oliver and Gene want to come up with a way to keep Connie at school. That night, Connie is with her friends. Gene shows up in a tuxedo and begins kissing Connie. Oliver then arrives, says he can't be without Connie and starts kissing her. Conklin comes by and does the same. Gladys and Ellen can't believe Connie would leave teaching and give up that attention.
115	16	"Twins at School"	John Rich	Arthur Alsberg & Joseph Quillan	January 27, 1956
Forbes Prescott (Dan Tobin), a car salesman, has taken Connie for a test drive in an English sports-car. Connie tells him she'll take a second job in order to pay for the car. Mrs. Davis reminds Connie that school policy doesn't permit outside work. She could be fired. Connie pretends to be her twin sister Bonnie and gets a job at a diner. Mr. Munsey drops by the diner to warn Connie that Conklin is coming by and doesn't believe the twin sister ruse. Conklin arrives and tells Connie that he's arranged for Mrs. Nestor to meet him here. Conklin is surprised when Mrs. Nestor wants to hire Bonnie to teach dance at the school. Ruth would like Bonnie and Connie to be at Conklin's office the next morning. Connie has to use Oliver's trick door again to be in two places at once. Conklin is also interested in the sports-car and talks to Forbes. Forbes mentions that Connie took a second job to afford the car. Conklin discovers the trick door between his office and Oliver's. Dressed as Bonnie, Connie interviews with Mrs. Nestor. Ruth says that she also wants to give a job to Conklin's brother Dusty. Conklin comes in dressed as his brother. Conklin lets Connie know he's doing this for the same reason she is, to buy the car. Now both Connie and Conklin have to use the trick door and things don't work out so well. Peter Leeds as Charlie.
116	17	"Mrs. Nestor's Boy Friend"	John Rich	Arthur Alsberg & Joseph Quillan	February 3, 1956
Connie complains to Mrs. Davis about Mrs. Nestor's new anti-fraternizing campaign between the staff. Mrs. Davis has a persistent suitor named Henry Finley (Will Wright) who she'd like to get rid of. Henry arrives and Connie tells him that Mrs. Davis had to leave for a Ladies Aid meeting. But Mrs. Davis makes a lot of noise in the kitchen and Henry knows she's home. They wind up going out. At school, Conklin tells Connie that they need to do something about Mrs. Nestor's new rule. She's even charging 50 cents for each infraction. Conklin meets with Connie, Oliver and Gene to discuss what to do. Connie decides a date between Mrs. Nestor and Mr. Finley is what everyone needs. Connie visits Henry at his flower shop. Henry says that Mrs. Davis called and doesn't want to see him anymore. Connie tells Henry about Mrs. Nestor. Ruth comes by the flower shop and she and Henry become acquainted. Ruth and Henry have a date at her house. An embarrassing situation arises when Connie, Conklin, Gene and Oliver are caught trying to spy on the couple. The next day, Mrs. Nestor agrees to drop her rule if Connie can get rid of Mr. Finley.
117	18	"Acting Director"	John Rich	Arthur Alsberg & Joseph Quillan	February 10, 1956
Mr. Munsey tells Connie that a Mr. Garson Felix (Herb Vigran) told him and Conklin that he'll be shooting some pictures around the school. Garson Felix is the casting director from Warner Brothers. He got a tip that some of the teachers had acting ability. Oliver feels it will be very distracting to the students. Conklin wants Connie to get rid of Garson when he shows up. At school, Lucretia Hannibal (Nancy Kulp), Mrs. Nestor's secretary, tells Garson that he needs to leave. Grady (Peter Leeds) the cameraman arrives. Connie tells them they will have to leave. But then she starts posing for Grady's picture taking. Gene comes in dressed as a Roman gladiator and then Conklin as a pilgrim. Oliver comes by as a Native American. Connie learns that it was Gene that sent a letter to Garson about the talent at the school. Everyone now tries to impress the camera with their acting. Something they overhear makes Connie believe she can be a star. Lucretia gets Mrs. Nestor to come back early from a trip to get rid of Garson. The teachers act again for what they think is a hidden camera and Mrs. Nestor is watching it all. Mrs. Nestor reveals herself and the teachers make a quick exit.
118	19	"Mr. Boynton's Return"	John Rich	Arthur Alsberg & Joseph Quillan	February 17, 1956
Mrs. Davis had something to tell Connie, but she can't remember what. Connie has a date with Mr. Talbot soon. Mrs. Davis then remembers that Philip Boynton (Robert Rockwell) will be coming by in a short time. Connie decides to call Gloria Stillwell and see if she could go out with Gene. Connie reminisces about the last time she saw Philip in her classroom at Madison High. She was about to get a goodbye kiss from Philip when Conklin walks in. Gene arrives and then Philip shows up. Gloria comes by and thinks Philip is Gene. Philip isn't sure what's going on, but he leaves with Gloria. The next morning, Philip comes by the school and meets Oliver and Gene. Turns out that Gene and Philip went to high school together. Gene says that Conklin has some work for Connie to do, so he and Philip go to have lunch. More bad timing occurs and Philip has to get to the airport without seeing Connie. Connie would fly to Seattle to see Philip, but she doesn't have any money. Connie arrives at the airport and runs into Philip. Connie is dressed as a little girl and hopes to fly for free as Philip's child. The Airport Clerk (Frank Nelson) doesn't quite believe Connie, but will let her fly. Conklin comes by and ruins Connie's attempt to go. Philip decides to spend the weekend with Connie and not fly to Seattle.
119	20	"White Lies"	John Rich	Arthur Alsberg & Joseph Quillan	February 24, 1956
Mrs. Davis tells Connie that she got a letter from George Bagley (Herb Butterfield), an old sweetheart she hasn't seen in 35 years. He will be in town for a day, but won't have time to see her. He will give her a call though. Mrs. Davis wrote him that she had gotten plastic surgery and sent him a picture of Connie. George calls and Mrs. Davis makes Connie talk to him pretending to be her. He says he's in the school supply business and he brought his nephew Paul (Elliott Reid) with. After the call, George tells Paul to go to Mrs. Nestor's school. Connie is often tardy because her dates with Mr. Talbot run late and Conklin wants to speak to her. Connie tells Gene she doesn't want to go out with him anymore. Conklin asks Connie the reason for her tardiness, but she won't say who she was with. Paul Bagley arrives and Conklin sends him to speak with Mr. Munsey. Oliver tells Connie how young looking Bagley was, thinking he was George. Oliver also mentions how Conklin is building a case to have her fired so his sister can get the job. Mrs. Davis tells Connie that George has found time to see her that evening. Mrs. Davis wants Connie to fill in for her. Conklin overhears that Connie will have a date with a 65 year old man. That night, Conklin shows up in a disguise hoping Connie will think he's the old man. Connie is not fooled. Things get interesting when Gene shows up and then George.
120	21	"The Great Land Purchase"	John Rich	Arthur Alsberg & Joseph Quillan	March 2, 1956
Angela is selling her home. Mrs. Davis wants to buy it, but thinks Angela is asking too much money. Connie believes that if Angela thinks her sister is buying a different house, she'll come down in price. Meanwhile, Conklin is talking with real estate agent Irving Fisher (Byron Foulger). Conklin has bought a new home, but Irving thinks they'll have trouble selling Conklin's old one. An all night bowling alley has been built next to the house. Conklin thinks he might be able to sell the house to Mrs. Davis. Connie tells Mrs. Davis that Mr. Talbot is sending over a real estate agent friend to pretend to want to sell her a home. Mr. Fisher comes by the house and Connie thinks he is Gene's friend. Thinking it's all part of the ruse, Mrs. Davis agrees to buy the house, despite Irving telling them there's a bowling alley next to it. Connie gets a call from Gene who says his friend wouldn't be able to make it. Connie learns that Mrs. Davis actually bought Conklin's house. Connie begs Conklin to let Mrs. Davis out of the deal. Irving tells Connie that he had Mrs. Davis sign the wrong papers. She actually bought 10 acres of desert land next to Conklin's new house. Connie goes to see Conklin. Connie has a Mr. Peterson (Charles Williams) also come by. Peterson claims to want to buy the desert land and put a carnival there. An Army Colonel then comes buy saying he'll buy the land and put an Army Proving ground there. Conklin agrees to buy the land for more than Mrs. Davis paid for it.
121	22	"Raffle Ticket"	John Rich	Arthur Alsberg & Joseph Quillan	March 9, 1956
Connie tells Mrs. Davis that she has won a $1,000 with a raffle ticket. There's an article in the paper about it. It lists the winning ticket's number, but not the name of the person. It does say the person is a teacher at Mrs. Nestor's school. Connie calls Aloysius Kilgallen (Frank Nelson) about what time she should be at Union Hall to pick up the prize. Mrs. Davis reminds Connie about Conklin's rule against gambling. At school, Conklin tells Mr. Munsey and Connie that he'll be doing a magic act at Union Hall this evening. He also says he'll be there earlier to fire whichever teacher it was that won the raffle. Mr. Talbot comes up with a plan for Connie to take Conklin's car keys so he can't get to the hall. Conklin still manages to get to the hall with his magician's cabinet but much later. Connie was in the cabinet and is afraid she is too late to pick up her prize. Connie and Oliver manage to lock Conklin in the cabinet and thanks to something Mrs. Davis did, Connie still gets her money.
122	23	"Library Quiz"	John Rich	Arthur Alsberg & Joseph Quillan	March 16, 1956
Leland Cheney (Robert Carson) drives Connie home from the department store in his limousine. They met at the store. Connie introduces him to Mrs. Davis and Mr. Talbot. Gene is not too happy to see Connie with Leland. The next morning Mrs. Nestor tells Connie and Conklin that a private library will be donating it's books to a school. Ruth will have two of her best students compete with two from another school in a quiz contest about English and History. Connie learns that it's Mr. Cheney who's donating the books. Ruth wants Connie to try and influence his decision. Meanwhile, it turns out that Leland is really Stokes, the real Leland Cheney's (Jonathan Hale) butler. Leland wants Stokes to stop impersonating him to get women. Connie comes by to talk to Leland about the library. Stokes continues to pretend to be Leland. Mrs. Nestor tells Connie and Conklin they will be the contestants in the quiz. It's quiz time at Cheney's house. Connie meets the real Leland Cheney. Leland is against the idea of adults competing against children, but the boy from the other school says he doesn't mind. Connie and Conklin cannot answer one question. Even though the other school won, Leland awards the library to Mrs. Nestor's school. He says the staff there clearly needs the books more.
123	24	"A Mother for Benny"	John Rich	Arthur Alsberg & Joseph Quillan	March 23, 1956
Connie knows that Benny treats her as his mother. What worries her is that Benny says his widowed father, Roberto Romero (Hy Averback), wants to meet her. Benny and Roberto arrive at the house and Benny is sent out of the room. Roberto wants to figure out a way for Benny to not want Connie as a mother. Harry (Jack Albertson), from the grocery store, calls about Mrs. Davis' order. Connie pretends it's another man that she likes to make Benny think she dates a lot. Mrs. Davis calls and Connie pretends it's Mr. Talbot. At school, little Karen March (Pamela Baird) asks Connie if she is going to be Benny's mother. After class, Karen tells Connie that she doesn't have a father. Karen says that she would like Mr. Conklin for a father. Conklin comes in and Karen calls him daddy. Mr. Munsey mentions to Conklin and Connie that Karen's mother, Louise March (Doris Singleton), is a very nice woman. Connie decides to play matchmaker between Roberto and Louise. Roberto shows up to the house and Connie has him wait in the kitchen. Louise comes by and mentions that she's been trying to serve a subpoena on a Roberto Romero. He's been keeping a calf in his back yard and it's been eating people plants including her own. Roberto walks in and he and Louise are attracted to each other. Connie tries to get Roberto to leave. Roberto introduces himself and Louise still wants to go out with him.
124	25	"Connie and Frankie"	John Rich	Arthur Alsberg & Joseph Quillan	March 30, 1956
Mr. Munsey tells Connie that he has fallen for Lucretia Hannibal. Oliver also says that he asked Conklin to possibly give Mr. Boynton a job as Philip's school in Arizona folded. When Connie tells Philip about the job, he says he could only take it if his friend Frankie Chapman (Peggie Castle) got a job as well. Frankie is an athletic director. Connie says that could work as their last director, Gene Talbot, has left. The next day, Conklin tells Connie there isn't enough money to hire Frankie. Philip comes by and Conklin is about to tell him his decision, when Frankie walks in. Frankie turns out to be a beautiful woman and Conklin gives her the job. Lucretia tells Connie that ever since Frankie showed up, Oliver has been ignoring her. Oliver and Philip show up arm in arm with Frankie. After they leave, Lucretia says they need to find a way to get rid of Frankie. Connie and Martha Conklin (Paula Winslowe) will work together to change Osgood's mind. Frankie tells Conklin she hasn't found a place to stay yet and Conklin offers his guest room. Conklin pretends to call his wife with the news when Martha and Connie walk in. Martha arranges for Connie, Lucretia and several other teachers and staff to move into the house. Conklin agrees to get rid of Frankie.
125	26	"Top Hat, White Tie, and Bridle"	John Rich	Arthur Alsberg & Joseph Quillan	April 6, 1956
Conklin calls Connie and wants her to come over that evening to do some typing for him. Connie mentions to Mrs. Davis that Roberto Romero and Louise March are going to be married. Just then, Benny arrives and says he's running away from home. Benny complains that his father is always with Louise and he never sees him anymore. Roberto comes by and Connie tells him what Benny said. Roberto says that Louise is away for a week on business. When she returns, they will be married. Connie goes to Conklin's house. Karen March comes by and says she's running away from home. Karen wants Conklin to adopt her. Karen says that unless her mother and Roberto marry by tomorrow night, no one will ever see her again. The next day, Benny tells Connie he will also run away if his father isn't married by this evening. Connie suggests to Roberto that she stand in for Louise and they will be married by proxy. Benny hears part of this and thinks his father will marry Connie. At Connie's house, the ceremony starts and Benny shows up. There are many interruptions and confusing substitutions and the Judge gets upset and leaves.
126	27	"24 Hours"	John Rich	Arthur Alsberg & Joseph Quillan	April 13, 1956
Connie and Philip are setting up a picnic table for some friends who will join them. The conversation leads to Connie mentioning how they're both still single. Oliver and Lucretia arrive arm in arm and say they won't be able to stay for the picnic. Mrs. Davis says she can't stay as her old boyfriend George Bagley is in town. Osgood and Martha come by and say they can't join the picnic as they want to spend some romantic time together. Philip's friend Bob Lansing (Peter Leeds) says he and his wife Grace (Sandra Gould) won't make the picnic as it's their anniversary. Connie suggests that everyone get together at her house the next evening. Bob says he's surprised that Philip and Connie aren't married yet. Philip tells Connie he'd be less reluctant to get married if they go a full day without encountering a quarreling couple. The next day, Connie does what she can to make sure Philip only sees happy married couples. The 24 hours are almost up and Osgood and Martha come by Connie's house and they're arguing. Connie finds a way to get Conklin to make up with his wife. Grace comes by and says she had a fight with Bob and he's leaving her. Philip finds out and says he won the bet. Bob arrives and makes up with Grace. Connie kisses Philip.
127	28	"Geraldine"	John Rich	Arthur Alsberg & Joseph Quillan	April 20, 1956
Benny talks to Mr. Sampson (George Chandler), the Milkman, about his horse, Geraldine. Sampson wants to sell the horse because she's old and he can't afford to keep her. Benny says that Connie wants to buy a horse for the school. Connie comes by saying she's supposed to buy a young horse for the kids to ride on. Mr. Boynton arrives and talks Connie into buying Geraldine. Conklin wants Connie to return the horse. Philip comes in and says Geraldine is going to have a baby. Now Conklin wants to keep the horse. Harvey Wheaton (Earle Ross) of the Medivale Dairy comes by and wants to reclaim the horse. Despite Connie paying for the horse, it wasn't a legal sale and he'll have the horse picked up later. Because they haven't been refunded the money yet, Connie wants to take Geraldine to a ranch in Arizona. Munsey has a large trailer and Conklin, Philip, Connie and Oliver start the trip. They hear on the radio that the police have been alerted about the horse and that Benny Romero is missing. Benny comes out of a trunk in the trailer and then a Policeman (Joe Devlin) shows up. He's checking trailers for a horse and Benny. Benny gives a different name and claims Connie and Philip are his parents. Despite the horse making noise, they are able to get rid of the Policeman. Geraldine has three foals. Later, Conklin tells Mrs. Davis that Wheaton is letting Geraldine stay in Arizona and one of the foals became attached to Connie.
128	29	"The $350,000 Question"	John Rich	Arthur Alsberg & Joseph Quillan	April 27, 1956
The Conklin's, Oliver and Philip are at Connie's house playing charades. They decide to watch the show "The $350,000 Question". Mrs. Davis says that Connie submits questions to several game shows. The game-show host mentions that the next question was sent by Connie Brooks. The host states that if the contestant is unable to answer, Connie will receive several expensive prizes. The contestant doesn't know the answer. Conklin, Munsey, and Boynton all believe they deserve a share of the prizes for their perceived assistance with the question. When Connie says they didn't contribute, everyone leaves. What they don't know is that because the contestant answered the other 2 parts of the three part question, Connie will instead be awarded a years supply of frosted pig's knuckles. The next day, the men can't believe how selfish Connie is being. Connie confronts Conklin about how rude he was, and he pretends to be nice to her to get on her good side. She won't let Conklin have the motorboat she won, but he could use it. Oliver tells Connie that Lucretia won't marry him unless he could have the furniture that Connie won. Philip pretends to have a bad back because he's been doing his own house work. He couldn't afford to keep his part time maid. He would like the years worth of maid service that Connie won. Connie learns that all she won was the pig's knuckles. Connie gives Oliver a doll house full of furniture, Conklin a toy boat and Connie will be Philip's maid.
129	30	"Principal for a Day"	John Rich	Arthur Alsberg & Joseph Quillan	May 4, 1956
Conklin holds a meeting to discuss the school's dire financial situation. Mrs. Nestor received an offer from a television syndicate wanting to turn the school into a TV studio. But the bid was too low. Oliver gets a call from his sister and she says the syndicate raised their offer and she accepted it. Now they're out of their jobs. Connie tells Benny and Mr. Romero what happened. Conklin tells Connie that for the rest of the semester, he'll make her life miserable. Mr. Romero tells Connie he formed a syndicate and bought the school and is making Connie the Principal. Connie now decorates the school with a more feminine touch and Conklin fawns over Connie to keep a job. Oliver and Philip complain to each other about how their rooms now look. Conklin comes by Connie's house and she bosses him around a bit. Mr. Romero calls Connie to tell her the deal fell through. She now puts on a show and begs Romero to not buy the school and keep Conklin as Principal. Philip and Oliver come by laughing about how they insulted Conklin earlier. The two learn Conklin is back in charge. Mrs. Davis comes by and Conklin finds out that the deal fell through and Connie was just acting.
130	31	"Travel Crazy"	John Rich	Arthur Alsberg & Joseph Quillan	May 11, 1956
Connie and Philip are discussing summer travel plans but neither have enough money for their dream vacation. By pooling their savings with others a contest is entered where the winner gets the entire amount for a trip to Europe. Jack Albertson as Harry.
