= Our Miss Brooks (film) =

1956 film

- Directed by: Al Lewis
- Written by: Al Lewis; Joseph Quillan
- Produced by: David Weisbart
- Starring: Eve Arden; Gale Gordon; Don Porter; Robert Rockwell
- Cinematography: Joseph LaShelle
- Edited by: Clarence Kolster; Fredrick Y. Smith
- Music by: Roy Webb
- Production company: Lute Productions
- Distributed by: Warner Bros. Pictures
- Release date: April 24, 1956
- Running time: 85 minutes
- Country: United States
- Language: English

Our Miss Brooks is a 1956 American comedy film starring Eve Arden, Gale Gordon, Don Porter and Robert Rockwell, based on the radio and TV sitcom hit on CBS of the same name. Directed by Al Lewis, who was the chief writer for the radio and TV editions, and written by both him and Joseph Quillan, the film disregarded the past four years of television and started with a new storyline. It was distributed by Warner Bros. Pictures.

== Plot ==
Unmarried, sarcastic English literature and grammar teacher Connie Brooks (Eve Arden) arrives in a small Midwestern town to teach at the local high school. She meets handsome, athletic biology teacher Phillip Boynton (Robert Rockwell), and they begin dating. Boynton, however, is unwilling to commit to the relationship, and several years of platonic dating pass (to Miss Brooks' consternation).

When student Gary Nolan (Nick Adams) does poorly in her class, his father—wealthy local newspaper publisher Lawrence Nolan (Don Porter)—accuses Miss Brooks of being incompetent. Brooks convinces Mr. Nolan that he's working too hard and neglecting his son. Mr. Nolan hires Miss Brooks to tutor his son in English, and agrees to spend more time with Gary. As Gary becomes a better-adjusted youth, Mr. Nolan begins to romance Miss Brooks.

Meanwhile, high school principal Osgood Conklin (Gale Gordon) is criticized by Superintendent Stone (Joseph Kearns) for being a martinet. Conklin decides to seek election to Stone's job, and convinces Miss Brooks to manage his campaign. Miss Brooks convinces Nolan to support Conklin in his newspaper. This gives Nolan more time to romance Miss Brooks, causing Boynton to become jealous. Boyton's jealousy convinces Miss Brooks that he does love her after all, and she breaks off her budding romance with Mr. Nolan.

Conklin seems on the verge of defeating Stone in the next election, but withdraws from the race after learning how little the job pays. Miss Brooks overhears one half of a telephone conversation in which Boynton buys a home and tells the real estate broker that he will be sharing it with "Mrs. Boynton." Miss Brooks assumes that Boynton will soon ask her to marry him, and that he is buying the property as a home for them. But it turns out that Boynton is buying it for himself and his mother, whose loneliness is causing her to have psychosomatic illnesses. But everything turns out all right once Mrs. Boynton realizes how this is going to affect her son's relationship with Miss Brooks. She moves in with Miss Brooks' eccentric landlady, Mrs. Margaret Davis (Jane Morgan), instead.

As the film ends, Boynton finally proposes to Miss Brooks and gives her an engagement ring (which is promptly stolen by a chimpanzee at the zoo).

== Cast ==
- Eve Arden as Connie Brooks
- Gale Gordon as Osgood Conklin
- Don Porter as Lawrence Nolan
- Robert Rockwell as Phillip Boynton
- Jane Morgan as Margaret Davis
- Richard Crenna as Walter Denton
- Nick Adams as Gary Nolan
- Leonard Smith as Stretch Snodgrass
- Gloria McMillan as Harriet Conklin
- Joseph Kearns as Superintendent Stone
- William Newell as Dr. Henley
- Philip Van Zandt as Mr. Webster
- Marjorie Bennett as Mrs. J. Boynton
- Joseph Forte as Nolan's butler
- June Blair as Miss Lonelyhearts

== See also ==
- List of American films of 1956
