= Aunt Mary (radio series) =

Radio serial

- Genre: Soap opera
- Running time: 15 minutes
- Country of origin: United States
- Language: English
- Syndicates: Initially NBC Pacific Stations; Later national through R.C.A. Recorded Program Services
- Starring: Jane Morgan
- Announcer: Vincent Pelletier; Marvin Miller
- Written by: Leigh and Virginia Crosby; Gil Faust; Virginia Thacker
- Directed by: George Fogle
- Original release: 1944 – 1961
- Sponsored by: Ben Hur Products; Safeway Stores, Inc. Albers Brothers Milling Company; Hudson Pulp & Paper Corp.

Aunt Mary is a 1944-1961 radio soap opera in the United States. Episodes were 15 minutes long, running Monday through Friday. The show began with regional broadcasts on the West Coast, but it eventually was distributed more widely.

Jane Morgan (not to be confused with singer Jane Morgan) starred as Aunt Mary. The actress is perhaps best remembered for her role as Mrs. Davis, Eve Arden's landlady on Our Miss Brooks.

Writers for the program were husband-and-wife team Leigh and Virginia Crosby. He "had been associated with the General Mills shows," and she "had been Irna Phillips's top writer." A 1949 article in Broadcasting added that Virginia Phillips' "credits include such top daytimers as The Guiding Light, Road of Life and Today's Children. Additional writers listed in another source were Gil Faust and Virginia Thacker. The program's director was George Fogle, who also directed the radio soap opera Ma Perkins for seven years.

Despite its modest beginning, Aunt Mary achieved and maintained a good level of popularity. An article in Broadcasting magazine, focusing on the program's celebration of its fifth anniversary, reported "Since it first went on the air in February 1944, Aunt Mary has been in the top 15 in the daytime Hooperratings and has usually ranked among the first five programs, national and regional." (The C.E. Hooper Company provided ratings for radio programs much like the Nielsen Company has done for television in more recent years.) The same article cited anecdotal evidence of the program's popularity, reporting "in one area where the program was discontinued, more than 400 letters were received within a week from listeners who wanted to know why it had been dropped and when it would return."

== Sponsors ==
Despite the name of its genre ("soap opera"), Aunt Mary, like some other daytime serials, apparently never was sponsored by a soap company. When it began, it was a sustaining program. The initial sponsor was Los Angeles-based Ben Hur Products (later acquired by McCormick & Company), which promoted its coffee, tea and spices via the program. On Feb. 19, 1945, Safeway Stores, Inc. took over sponsorship. By 1948, Albers Brothers Milling Company had become the sponsor. When the show spread to eastern regions of the United States, Hudson Pulp & Paper Corp. sponsored broadcasts in New York City, Baltimore, Boston, and Philadelphia beginning January 14, 1946.

== Networks, schedule and distribution ==
Aunt Mary began on a small scale, carried "on 8 NBC California and Arizona stations (KFI, KMJ, KPO, KFSD, KTAR, KVOA, KGLU, KYZM) Monday-Friday, 10:30-10:45 a.m. (PWT)." Seven months later, Sept. 11, 1944, the program was moved to 3:45-4 p.m. (PWT) Monday-Friday. At that time it was carried on "12 NBC Western stations." By the program's first anniversary, "20 NBC Pacific stations" broadcast Aunt Mary in that same weekday afternoon time slot. Wider distribution was in the works, however. An article in Broadcasting in 1945 reported that the "show also will be released via transcriptions on a list of stations in eastern centers...". Effective Jan. 14, 1946, eastern stations WOR, WBAL, WBZ, WBZA, and KYW began carrying Aunt Mary.

The serial went into more markets beginning in 1948 after NBC bought it. The transaction was that network's first time "of acquiring rights to a daytime serial." NBC promoted the availability of Aunt Mary with a full-page ad in the May 17, 1948, issue of Broadcasting. An item in the May 31 issue of Broadcasting that year noted:

Release of more than 600 transcribed quarter-hour episodes of "Aunt Mary," daytime serial on NBC Western Network is slated by network's radio-recording division. Series, sponsored by Albers Div. of Carnation Co., and bought in January from C. & F. Productions Inc., will be available as an NBC syndicated program in the U.S. and Canada, except in the area served by the Western NBC stations.

As late as March 1961 (17 years after the program's launch), Aunt Mary was still listed ("605 serials, five a week series") among the programs offered by R.C.A. Recorded Program Services, the syndication arm of NBC. Aunt Mary even had an international aspect. A story in the April 4, 1949, issue of Broadcasting reported that Aunt Mary "is also heard in Australia, where it is performed live by an Australian cast, using scripts sent from Hollywood."

== Cast ==
In addition to Jane Morgan in the leading role, other cast members were as follows:

Role	Actor/Actress
Jessie Ward Calvert	Irene Tedrow
Lefty Larkin	Fred Howard
Peggy Mead	Jane Webb
Ben Calvert	Pat McGeehan
Kit Calvert	Josephine Gilbert
Bill Mead	Jack Edwards
David Bowman	Jay Novello
Dr. Lew Bracey	C. Hames Ware
Announcer	Vincent Pelletier
Announcer	Marvin Miller

Additional cast members, whose roles were not specified, were Tom Collins, Cy Kendall and Betty Gerson. Another source listed Pauline Drake as a member of the cast.
