= Gloria McMillan =

American actress (1933–2022)

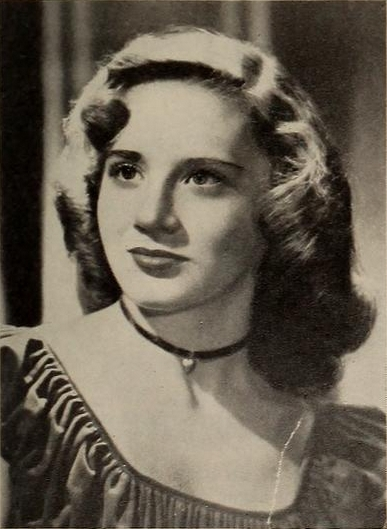
- McMillan in 1953
- Born: March 13, 1933; Portland, Oregon, U.S.
- Died: January 19, 2022 (aged 88); Huntington Beach, California, U.S.
- Education: Westlake School for Girls; Mount Saint Mary's College
- Occupation: Actress
- Years active: 1947–1990
- Known for: Our Miss Brooks
- Spouse(s): Gilbert W. Allen (1954–1974); Ron Cocking (June 28, 1987 – January 19, 2022; her death)
- Children: 5

Gloria McMillan (March 13, 1933 – January 19, 2022) was an American actress who worked extensively in radio, but is perhaps best known for her role as Harriet Conklin, the student of Miss Brooks and the daughter of Principal Osgood Conklin, on the 1950s sitcom Our Miss Brooks.

== Early years ==
McMillan was born in Portland, Oregon, on March 13, 1933, but her family moved to Hollywood, California, when she was 7. She attended Westlake School for Girls, Immaculate Heart High School, and Mount Saint Mary's College. She also studied piano under Amparo Iturbi, fitting four hours of practice in among her other daily activities.

McMillan's sister, Janet, acted on stage and on radio and was a teacher.

== Stage ==
Early in her career, McMillan acted at the Pasadena Playhouse and with the La Jolla Players. In 1974, she returned to the stage in Seattle, in Under Papa's Picture. The production reunited her with Eve Arden, with whom she had worked in Our Miss Brooks. The play ran for nine weeks and "broke all records in the history of Seattle legitimate theater attractions." The production eventually went on tour to Washington, D.C., Dallas, Toronto, and London.

== Radio ==
At age 4, McMillan was singing on a radio station in Portland. Three years later, her family's relocation to Hollywood enabled her to become involved with radio entertainment there. The first radio drama on which she worked was Big Town.

From 1948 to 1957, McMillan played Harriet Conklin, daughter of high school principal Osgood Conklin (Gale Gordon), on Our Miss Brooks, starring opposite Eve Arden. Before beginning that program, she had the role of "Sharlee Bronson", girlfriend of the title character's ward, in Mayor of the Town. She also was a member of the cast of Meet Corliss Archer and was heard often on Dr. Christian.

== Television ==
From 1952 to 1956, McMillan portrayed Harriet Conklin in the television version of Our Miss Brooks. In 1956, she had that same role in the Our Miss Brooks film.

In the early 1960s, she was host of Faith of Our Children on KRCA-TV. In the fall of 1971, the Chancel Players of First United Presbyterian Church of San Bernardino appeared five times on Sunday Story Time, a children's television program on KABC-TV. The group was directed by McMillan, and she and her husband, the church's pastor, appeared on camera with an introduction and conclusion for each episode.

In 1976, McMillan had the role of nun Sister Ann in the pilot episode of Most Wanted on ABC, and, in 1990, her last credit was an episode of Perfect Strangers.

== Teaching ==
In September 1969, McMillan opened Star Way Academy of Drama with students enrolled in beginner, intermediate, and advanced levels of classes. In 1974, she and her second husband, Ron Cocking, opened The Looking Glass Studio of Performing Arts (LGPSA) in San Bernardino, California with the goal of building self-confidence and self-respect in children, aiding in "the development of the child into a total person", rather than training "primarily for professional roles. On June 30, 2018, she retired from teaching when all classes at The Looking Glass Studio of Performing Arts transferred to their new Redlands location run by her daughter, Kelly Uminski.

== Personal life and death ==
On November 23, 1954, McMillan married Gilbert W. Allen, a senior at the University of Southern California, in Beverly Vista Community Church in Beverly Hills, California. The wedding had Our Miss Brooks connections, as Gale Gordon gave the bride away, Richard Crenna was an usher, and Eve Arden's daughter was a junior bridesmaid. They had two sons and two daughters. Their marriage ended in divorce, and she later married Ron Cocking.

She was a member of Actors' Equity Association, Screen Actors Guild-American Federation of Television and Radio Artists (SAG-AFTRA), and the Academy of Television Arts & Sciences.

Gloria McMillan died at her home in Huntington Beach, California, on January 19, 2022, aged 88. She had been diagnosed two months earlier, in November 2021, with a cancerous tumor in her bile duct.

== Church activities ==
As a youth, McMillan was involved in church activities, including teaching a Sunday School class of first-grade children and leading her church's eighth-grade girls' club. Six months after her wedding, McMillan announced that she was giving up acting to help her husband in his ministry as he was preparing to enter the Presbyterian San Francisco Theological Seminary. The couple met through their mutual work with young people at Beverly Vista Community Church. McMillan said, "We've both had a good taste of church work, and we love it."

In 1965, McMillan and Allen led in establishing the first Presbyterian church in Huntington Beach, California, with Allen having been assigned that role by the Presbytery of Los Angeles. McMillan directed the drama group of First Presbyterian Church in San Bernardino, California, when her husband was pastor there in the late 1960s.

== Filmography ==
Year	Title	Role	Notes
1956	Our Miss Brooks	Harriet Conklin	
1975	Smile	Lady Judge	
