= Irene Tedrow =

American character actress (1907-1995)

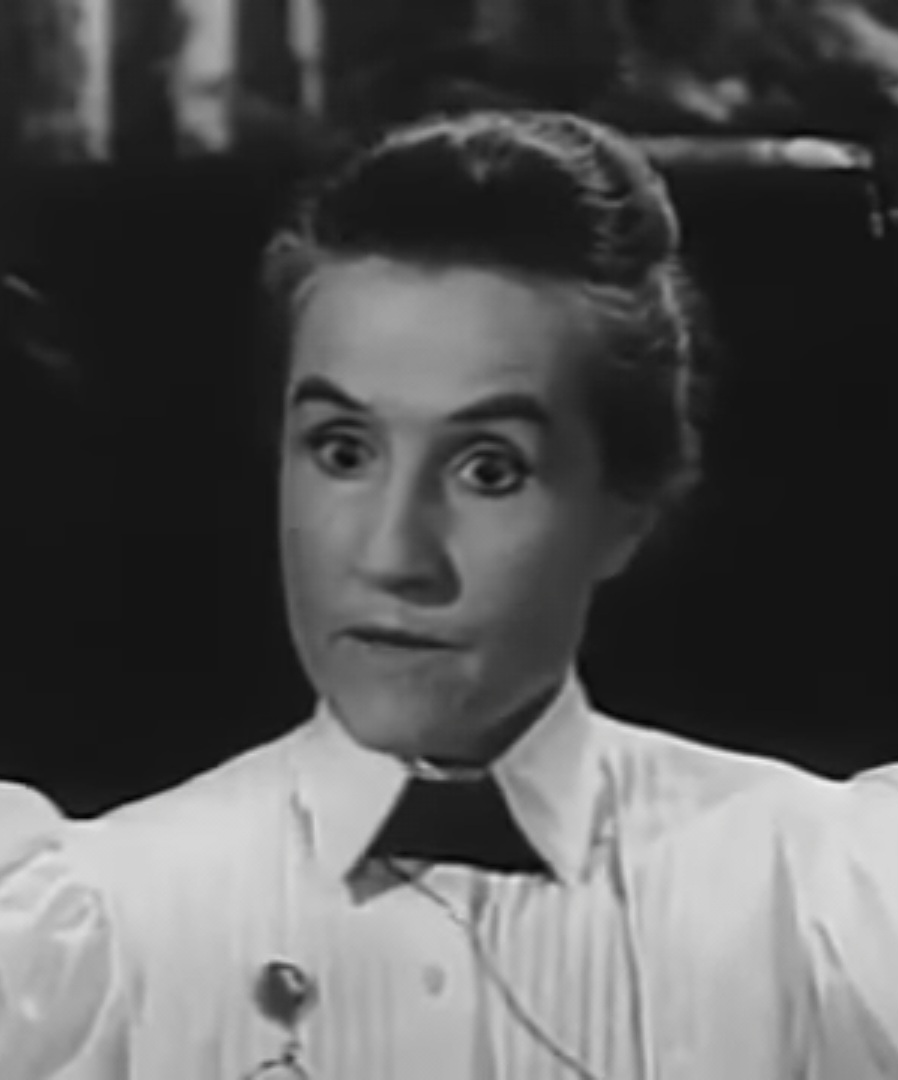
- Tedrow in the TV series One Step Beyond (1960)
- Born: August 3, 1907; Denver, Colorado, US
- Died: March 10, 1995 (aged 87); Hollywood, California, US
- Resting place: Westwood Village Memorial Park Cemetery
- Education: Carnegie Institute of Technology (BA degree in drama)
- Occupation: Actress
- Years active: 1929–1989
- Known for: Meet Corliss Archer
- Spouse: William Kent (m. 1939; died 1974)
- Children: 2, including Enid Kent

Irene Tedrow (August 3, 1907 – March 10, 1995) was an American character actress in stage, film, television and radio.

Among her notable roles are as Janet Archer in the radio series Meet Corliss Archer, Mrs. Lucy Elkins on the TV sitcom Dennis the Menace, and as Mrs. Webb in the stage production Our Town at the Plumstead Playhouse.

== Early life ==
Irene Tedrow was born in Denver, Colorado to Harry Ralph Beecher Tedrow and Camila Roberts Tedrow, the oldest of two sisters.

== Stage ==
Tedrow studied with Ben Iden Payne, who directed the Memorial Theater at Stratford-on-Avon, in England. She also had three seasons' experience with Maurice Evans's troupe in New York City and in national tourings. In 1931, she was a member of the Chautauqua Repertory Theater.

Tedrow was a founding member of San Diego's Old Globe Theater and was cast as an ingénue in the beginning of her career. In 1934, she portrayed 18 characters in multiple adaptations of Shakespearean plays at The Old Globe during the Chicago Fair. She later joined Orson Welles' Mercury Theater. She appeared on Broadway through her 80s, including roles in King Richard III (1937), Hamlet (1938-1939), King Henry IV, Part I (1939), Our Town (1969) and Pygmalion.

== Television ==
One of Tedrow's early roles as a regular cast member on a television program was that of Mrs. Ruggles on the first season of comedy series The Ruggles (1949-1950). In 1959 she played a small part as Mrs. Adams in the weekly series Maverick in the episode "Gun Shy". She had a recurring role on the Dennis the Menace television sitcom from 1959 to 1963, portraying the character Mrs. Elkins. In 1966, she was cast in The Addams Family in the role of the stern, taciturn governess Miss Thudd ("Just call me Thudd"). As a character actor, she appears in many other shows produced from the mid-1940s into the 1970s. Some of those shows include the Lux Video Theatre, Jefferson Drum, The Real McCoys, Rawhide, Mannix, The Twilight Zone, Leave it to Beaver, and The Andy Griffith Show. In 1955, she performed on The Jack Benny Program as a contestant with Benny in a mock segment of the You Bet Your Life series hosted by Groucho Marx.

In the early 1960s, Tedrow made two guest appearances on Perry Mason, including the role of Amy Douglas in "The Case of the Ominous Outcast", and a role on Bonanza in the episode "Abner Willoughby's Return". Later, she also performed in Dundee and the Culhane, Diff'rent Strokes, The Rockford Files, Facts of Life, Three's Company and two episodes of The Mary Tyler Moore Show as Congresswoman Margaret Geddes. In 1976, Tedrow played Mary Ludlow Hall, Eleanor Roosevelt's grandmother in Eleanor and Franklin. she was also a regular actress on the TV series Dragnet from 1949 to 1970.

== Radio ==
Tedrow's work in radio dated back at least to 1929. As a drama student at Carnegie Institute of Technology, she was master of ceremonies and student director for "Carnegie Tech Day at Gimbel's," which was broadcast on WCAE. A 1937 radio listing shows her as one of the actresses in George Bernard Shaw's Back to Methuselah when it was broadcast on NBC Blue.

During the 1940s and 1950s, Tedrow had roles in radio productions, including The Baby Snooks Show. Tedrow appeared in an episode of Gunsmoke, titled "The Promise" (a.k.a. "The Handcuffs"), in 1954. Her roles included those shown in the table below.

| Program | Role |
|---|---|
| Aunt Mary | Jessie Ward Calvert |
| Chandu the Magician | Dorothy Regent |
| Jonathan Trimble, Esquire | Alice Trimble |
| Meet Corliss Archer | Mrs. Archer |
| The Nebbs | Fannie |
| This Is Judy Jones | Mrs. Jones |

Source: On the Air: The Encyclopedia of Old-Time Radio except as noted.

== Recognition ==
Tedrow's performance in Eleanor and Franklin garnered her one of the first Primetime Emmy Award nominations for Best Supporting Actress in a Television Comedy or Drama Special (Outstanding Single Performance by a Supporting Actress in Comedy or Drama Special - 1976 per the Emmy Awards website).

== Personal life ==
Tedrow was married to William Kent, who originally had come to the United States as a refugee from Nazi Germany. The couple had two children, Roger and Enid.

== Death ==
On March 10, 1995, Tedrow died from stroke complications in Hollywood at age 87.

== Selected radiography ==
Radio
| Original air date | Program | Role | Episode |
|---|---|---|---|
| 1943-1956 | Meet Corliss Archer | Janet Archer | |
| 1944 | The Gallant Heart | Captain Julia Porter | |
| 1944-1961 | Aunt Mary | Jessie Ward Calvert | |
| 1946 | Jonathan Trimble, Esquire | Alice Trimble | |
| 1947 | My Friend Irma | Louise Cartwright | |
| 1947-1951 | The Adventures of Philip Marlowe | | |
| 1948 | The George Burns and Gracie Allen Show | Martha Dayton | "The New Neighbors" |
| 1948-1950 | Chandu the Magician | Dorothy Regent | 1948 Revival Series |
| 1949-1954 | Broadway Is My Beat | | |
| 1951 | The Lottery | | |
| 1953 | Lux Radio Theatre | Doctor Lucille Duprey | "The War of the Worlds" |
| 1953 | Crime Classics | Lizzie Borden | "The Bloody, Bloody Banks Of Fall River" |
| September 6, 1954 | Gunsmoke | Wife | "The Promise (The Handcuffs)" |
| July 3, 1956 | Suspense | | "The Music Lovers" |

== Filmography ==
=== Film ===
| Year | Title | Role | Notes |
|---|---|---|---|
| 1940 | We Who Are Young | Office Girl | uncredited |
| 1941 | Cheers for Miss Bishop | Teacher waving from window | uncredited |
| 1942 | Eagle Squadron | woman | |
| 1942 | The Moon and Sixpence | Mrs. MacAndrew | uncredited |
| 1943 | Nobody's Darling | Julia Rhodes | uncredited |
| 1944 | Song of the Open Road | Miss Casper (teacher) | uncredited |
| 1945 | The Strange Affair of Uncle Harry | Mrs. Follinsbee | uncredited |
| 1946 | Just Before Dawn | Nurse Florence White | uncredited |
| 1947 | They Won't Believe Me | First Woman | uncredited |
| 1948 | The Mating of Millie | Receptionist | uncredited |
| 1949 | Air Hostess | Miss Hamilton | |
| 1951 | The Company She Keeps | Mrs. Seeley | |
| 1953 | A Lion Is in the Streets | Mrs. Sophie Peck | uncredited |
| 1953 | Julius Caesar | Citizen of Rome | uncredited |
| 1955 | Santa Fe Passage | Ptewaquin | |
| 1956 | Slander | Marion Gregg, Secretary | uncredited |
| 1957 | Loving You | Mrs. Jessup | uncredited |
| 1958 | Saddle the Wind | Mrs. Mary Ellison | uncredited |
| 1960 | Please Don't Eat the Daisies | Mrs. Greenfield | uncredited |
| 1961 | A Thunder of Drums | Mrs. Scarborough | |
| 1961 | The Parent Trap | Miss Lockness | |
| 1962 | Deadly Duo | Lenora Spence | |
| 1965 | The Cincinnati Kid | Mrs. Rudd | |
| 1970 | Getting Straight | Mrs. Stebbins | |
| 1975 | Mandingo | Mrs. Redfield | |
| 1977 | Empire of the Ants | Velma Thompson | |
| 1978 | Foul Play | Mrs. Monk | |
| 1979 | The Story of Heidi | Granny | English dub |
| 1980 | Midnight Madness | Mrs. Grimhaus | |
| 1981 | All Night Long | Loft Landlady | |

=== Television ===
| Year | Title | Role | Notes |
|---|---|---|---|
| 1949 | The Ruggles | Margaret Ruggles | first season only |
| 1953 | Dragnet | Bernice Hopper | episode: "The Big Crime" |
| 1955 | Alfred Hitchcock Presents | Lucy the Sister-in-Law | Season 1 Episode 4: "Don't Come Back Alive" |
| 1955 | The Millionaire | Countess Turec | 1 episode |
| 1955 | Letter to Loretta | Beatrice | 1 episode |
| 1955 | The Jack Benny Program | You Bet Your Life Contestant | 1 episode, with Jack Benny in a skit in which they play contestants on You Bet Your Life |
| 1956 | Alfred Hitchcock Presents | Mrs. Hewitt | Season 1 Episode 23: "Back for Christmas" |
| 1956 | The Joseph Cotten Show: On Trial | Mrs. Patterson | episode: "The Trial of Edward Pritchard" |
| 1957 | Highway Patrol | Eileen Haley | 1 episode |
| 1958 | Jefferson Drum | Mary Easton | episode: "Showdown" |
| 1958 | The Real McCoys | Mehitabel Swanson (1958); Mrs. Platt and Mrs. Gherkins (both 1961) | 3 episodes |
| 1958 | Northwest Passage | Cora Klagg | 1 episode |
| 1958 | Leave It to Beaver | Mrs. Claudia Hathaway | 1 episode |
| 1959 | Rawhide | Minnie Lou | 1 episode |
| 1959 | The Twilight Zone | Martin Sloan's mother | episode: "Walking Distance" |
| 1959-1963 | Dennis the Menace | Mrs. Lucy Elkins | 26 episodes |
| 1960 | Alfred Hitchcock Presents | Lady Musgrave | Season 5 Episode 29: "The Hero" |
| 1960 | Alcoa Presents: One Step Beyond | Dr. J.H. Sesselshreiber | 1 episode |
| 1960 | Perry Mason | Amy Douglas | Season 3 Episode 24: "The Case of the Ominous Outcast" |
| 1960 | Mr. Lucky | Madam Maria | 1 episode |
| 1960 | The Twilight Zone | Mrs. Loren | episode: "The Lateness of the Hour" |
| 1960 | Wagon Train | Freda | 1 episode |
| 1961 | Pete and Gladys | Mrs. Vincent | episode: "The House Next Door" |
| 1961 | Sea Hunt | Naomi Roundtree | 1 episode |
| 1961 | Bonanza | Mrs. Bufford | episode: "The Outcast" |
| 1961–1962 | Father of the Bride | Miss Bellamy | 4 episodes |
| 1962 | The Tall Man | Maw Killgore | episode: "Three for All" |
| 1962 | Bonanza | Winifred Mahon | episode: "Blessed Are They" |
| 1963 | The Alfred Hitchcock Hour | Ethel | episode: "The Paragon" |
| 1963 | Dr. Kildare | June Crowley | 1 episode |
| 1963 | Ensign O'Toole | Mrs. Barnes | 1 episode |
| 1963 | Grindl | Nurse Gardiner | 1 episode |
| 1963 | Perry Mason | Sister Theresa | Season 7 Episode 1: "The Case of the Nebulous Nephew" |
| 1964 | Burke's Law | Librarian | 1 episode |
| 1965 | Branded | Mrs. Wilcox | 1 episode |
| 1965 | Karen | Mrs. Sloat | 1 episode |
| 1965 | The Andy Griffith Show | Mrs. Foster | episode: "Opie's Newspaper" |
| 1965 | The Fugitive | Maude Keller | 1 episode |
| 1966 | Hogan's Heroes | Jenny | 1 episode |
| 1966 | The Addams Family | Miss Thudd | episode: "Morticia & Gomez vs Fester & Grandmama" |
| 1967 | The Invaders | Clare Lapham | 1 episode |
| 1967 | The Flying Nun | Mother Provincial David | 1 episode |
| 1967 | Dundee and the Culhane | Widow Hughes | 1 episode |
| 1968 | Bonanza | Kerri Pickett | episode: "Different Pines, Same Wind"; Tedrow's third of five appearances in the series |
| 1969 | Family Affair | Alice | 1 episode |
| 1969 | The Mod Squad | Eloise | 1 episode |
| 1969 | Bonanza | Minnie Mitchell | episode: "Abner Willoughby's Return" |
| 1970 | Room 222 | Victoria Langley | Season 2, Episode 3: "The Lincoln Story" |
| 1971 | Mannix | Sara Dawes | 1 episode |
| 1972 | Banacek | Dr. Dora Bancroft | 1 episode |
| 1972 | Bonanza | Mrs. Caines | episode: "The Sound of Sadness" |
| 1973 | Barnaby Jones | Mrs. Ryan | 1 episodes |
| 1973 | Mary Tyler Moore Show | Congresswoman Margaret Geddes | 2 episodes |
| 1974 | Kung Fu | Mrs. Stekel | 1 episode |
| 1974 | Marcus Welby, M.D. | Eileen McAdams | 1 episode |
| 1975 | Little House on the Prairie | Minerva Farnsworth | 1 episode |
| 1976 | Good Heavens | Old Lady | 1 episode |
| 1976 | Charlie's Angels | Sister Anne | 1 episode |
| 1977 | The Hardy Boys/Nancy Drew Mysteries | Ruby | 1 episode |
| 1977 | Halloween Is Grinch Night | Mariah | TV special |
| 1977 | Quincy M.E. | Doctor Ruth Thaler | episode: "A Question of Time" |
| 1978 | The Amazing Spider-Man | Aunt May | episode: "Night of the Clones" |
| 1978 | Diff'rent Strokes | Mrs. Drummond | 1 episode |
| 1978 | Three's Company | Aunt Martha | episode: "The Older Woman" |
| 1979 | Salvage 1 | Aunt Adah | 1 episode |
| 1979 | Quincy M.E. | Mrs. Osborne | episode: "Mode of Death" |
| 1979 | 240-Robert | Fake Sissie | 1 episode |
| 1980 | House Calls | Mrs. Bruckner | 1 episode |
| 1980 | Quincy M.E. | Mrs. Estes | episode: "The Night Killer" |
| 1981 | Isabel's Choice | Mrs. Harper | TV movie |
| 1982 | Trapper John, M.D. | Mrs. Pinkler | episode: "Love and Marriage" |
| 1982 | Quincy M.E. | Mrs. Weinecke | episode: "Expert in Murder" |
| 1982 | Three's Company | Miss Arlington | episode: "The Brunch" |
| 1982 | The Devlin Connection | Margaret Hollister | episode: "Erica" |
| 1983 | The Last Ninja | Dr. Sanford | TV movie |
| 1984 | CBS Schoolbreak Special | Miss Bowring | episode: "Welcome Home, Jellybean" |
| 1984 | Family Secrets | Mrs. Fenwick | TV movie |
| 1984 | Remington Steele | Nanny Perkins | episode: "Blue Blooded Steele" |
| 1985 | The Paper Chase | Mrs. Whitney | episode: "The Day Kingsfield Missed Class" |
| 1985 | The Facts of Life | Grace | episode: "Teacher, Teacher" |
| 1985 | Magnum, P.I. | Mrs. Wilson, the Antique Dealer | episode: "Going Home" |
| 1987 | St. Elsewhere | Guest | episode: "Slip Sliding Away" |
| 1987 | Punky Brewster | Maude Fierstein | episode: "Hands Across the Halls" |
| 1987 | The New Leave It To Beaver | Aunt Martha Bronson | episode: "A Part of Life" |
| 1988 | The New Leave It To Beaver | Aunt Martha Bronson | episode: "Ensign Cleaver" |
| 1988 | 14 Going on 30 | May | TV movie |
| 1988 | It's Garry Shandling's Show | Grandma Shandling | episode: "Garry Falls Down a Hole" |
| 1988 | L.A. Law | Katherine Crutcher | episode: "Open Heart Perjury" |
| 1989 | A Deadly Silence | Grandma Virginia Pierson | TV movie |

== Award nominations ==
| Year | Award | Result | Category | Film or series |
|---|---|---|---|---|
| 1976 | Emmy Award | Nominated | Outstanding Single Performance by a Supporting Actress in Comedy or Drama Special | Eleanor and Franklin |
| 1978 | Emmy Award | Nominated | Outstanding Lead Actress for a Single Appearance in a Drama or Comedy Series | James at 15 for the episode "Ducks" |
