= Has Anybody Seen My Gal (film) =

1952 film by Douglas Sirk

Has Anybody Seen My Gal?
- Theatrical release poster by Reynold Brown
- Directed by: Douglas Sirk
- Screenplay by: Joseph Hoffman
- Story by: Eleanor H. Porter
- Produced by: Ted Richmond
- Starring: Piper Laurie; Rock Hudson; Charles Coburn; Gigi Perreau; Lynn Bari; William Reynolds
- Cinematography: Clifford Stine
- Edited by: Russell Schoengarth
- Music by: Joseph Gershenson
- Production company: Universal-International
- Distributed by: Universal Pictures
- Release date: June 25, 1952
- Running time: 89 minutes
- Country: United States
- Language: English

Has Anybody Seen My Gal [sic] is a 1952 American comedy film directed by Douglas Sirk and starring Piper Laurie, Rock Hudson, Charles Coburn and Gigi Perreau. It is loosely based on the 1918 novel Oh Money! Money! by Eleanor H. Porter. The film leans heavily on period detail from the 1920s, such as flappers, the Charleston and raccoon coats. It is named after the jazz song "Has Anybody Seen My Gal?", which was a hit for the California Ramblers during the 1920s. Although the song is sung during the film, its lyrics have no particular relation to the plot.

== Plot ==
In 1928, aging and lonely Tarrytown, New York millionaire Samuel Fulton decides to leave his fortune to the family of the late Millicent Blaisdell, the only woman whom he has ever loved, although she did not love him in return. Samuel explains to his lawyer Edward Norton that losing Millicent motivated him to become a wealthy businessman. When Norton fears that the family will spend the money unwisely, Samuel visits them in the small town of Hilverton, Vermont, renting a room in their house under the alias John Smith.

Although the family is initially reluctant to accept Samuel, the youngest daughter Roberta makes him feel welcome. He notices that the Blaisdells are a happy family who, although poor, are proud of their background. Charles, the father, has taught the family not to prioritize material possessions, while mother Harriet wishes for her daughter Millie to marry Carl Pennock, a wealthy, snobbish man who can buy Millie everything that Harriet never had. Millie is not interested in Carl and prefers to marry Dan Stebbins, a soda jerk in Charles' drugstore.

Millie and Dan announce their engagement, which upsets Harriet. Shortly afterward, Norton arrives, announcing that the family has inherited $100,000 from an anonymous benefactor. The family immediately abandons their humble life for the upper-class lifestyle. After Harriet declares that Dan will not be able to financially support Millie, Dan cancels their engagement, and Millie is forced to date Carl again. As the family moves into a lavish mansion, Harriet tells Samuel that he must leave, and Charles begrudgingly sells his store.

When Carl takes Millie to a speakeasy one night, Samuel helps them escape from a raid and is arrested in the process. Dan posts Samuel's bail. After learning that the oldest son Howard has a $2,000 gambling debt, Samuel recovers Howard's IOU in a casino, but he is captured in another raid. Dan again posts Samuel's bail and announces his decision to leave Hilverton to build a career. Seeking to bring Millie and Dan back together, Samuel arranges a meeting at the movies, but Dan rebuffs Millie and leaves. As Millie tearfully expresses her hatred for the family's sudden wealth, the Pennocks see Samuel comforting Millie and assume that they are dating.

During a cocktail party at the Blaisdell house, Harriet overhears gossip about Samuel and Millie from the movie theater and forces Millie to announce her engagement to Carl. At the engagement party, Charles reveals that he has lost his investments, which makes Samuel realize that the Blaisdells are in no position to make wise financial decisions. At Samuel's behest, Norton refuses to extend them a loan, so Charles begs the Pennocks for money. Upon learning that the Blaisdells are broke, the Pennocks refuse the loan and leave, canceling Millie and Carl's engagement.

Much to Harriet's distress, the Blaisdell family returns to their old lifestyle, Millie and Dan become engaged again, and Charles buys his old store. Roberta reveals that Samuel (whom she knows as John) has won the first prize at an art show, as she had secretly entered his paintings. Samuel leaves the house to avoid the press after bidding farewell to the Blaisdells, who now think of him as the grandfather that he could have been.

== Cast ==
- Piper Laurie as Millicent "Millie" Blaisdell
- Rock Hudson as Dan Stebbins
- Charles Coburn as Samuel Fulton/John Smith
- Gigi Perreau as Roberta Blaisdell
- Lynn Bari as Harriet Blaisdell
- William Reynolds as Howard Blaisdell
- Larry Gates as Charles Blaisdell
- Skip Homeier as Carl Pennock
- Paul Harvey as Judge Wilkins
- Paul McVey as Lester Pennock
- Gloria Holden as Clarissa Pennock
- Frank Ferguson as Edward Norton
- Forrest Lewis as Martin Quinn
- Sally Creighton as Arline Benson (uncredited)
- James Dean as youth at soda fountain (uncredited)
- Philo McCullough as Mr. Benson (uncredited)
- Jack Mower as Court Clerk (uncredited)
- Fritz Feld as Mr. Álvarez (uncrefited)

== Production ==
The film's working titles were Oh Money, Money and Has Anybody Seen My Girl.

James Dean has an uncredited role as a young man in one of the soda-fountain scenes.

== Home media ==
Universal released this film on DVD in 2006 as part of the Rock Hudson Screen Legend Collection, a three-disc set featuring four other films (A Very Special Favor, The Golden Blade, The Last Sunset and The Spiral Road). Universal released the film in 2015 as a standalone DVD as part of its Universal Vault Series.
