= Jerry of the Circus =

In the late 1930s this book cover was used as a promotional tie-in of both program and sponsor.

Jerry of the Circus was a 1937 syndicated radio serial broadcast for a juvenile audience. It was presented in 130 15-minute episodes of which 128 are in existence today. The series followed the adventures of Jerry Dougan and his dog Rags with the Randall Brothers Circus from the time of his father's death in the spring to the end of that year's performance season. Jerry Dougan's adventures continued in the 1937 serial Jerry at Fair Oaks.

== Characters ==
- Jerry Dougan – orphan who joins the Randall Brothers Circus when his father dies
- Rags – Jerry's dog
- Mr. Randall – owner of the Randall Brothers Circus (Lindsay McHarrie)
- Bumps – the clown Jerry bunks with; recruits Jerry's dog Rags for his act (Howard McNear)
- Patsy – the trapeze artist of the circus (Elvia Allman)
- Jason – the large cat trainer
- Carmen Bandini (voiced by actor who played the Girl Submarine Commander in Magic Island – tightrope walker who leaves the circus for Hollywood
- Major Mike – the little person who regards himself as the star attraction on the midway (Buddy Duncan)
- Decker/Dan Dougan – the kindly circus performer who turns out to be Jerry's big-game hunter uncle suffering from amnesia
- Lorenz – the knife-throwing performer who controls Decker through bribery
- Clara – the costumer
- Johnny Bradley – Shakespearean clown

== See also ==
- The Cinnamon Bear – another 1930s-era radio program intended for juvenile audiences
- Land of the Lost – 1943–48 radio fantasy adventure
- Magic Island – 1936 radio series about an orphan boy's adventures (not the same Jerry as in Jerry of the Circus)

== Listen to ==
- Jerry of the Circus in the Internet Archive's Old-Time Radio Collection
- OTR Network Library: Jerry of the Circus (128 episodes)
