= Rosa Barcelo =

American actress

Rosa Barcelo was a radio actress who portrayed Joan Gregory on Magic Island and Queen Melissa on The Cinnamon Bear. She also was a member of the cast of Secret Ambition, which originated at KNX radio in Los Angeles, California, and was carried on CBS' Pacific Coast network.
