= Sally Creighton =

American actress

- Occupation: Actress
- Years active: 1951–1955

Sally Creighton was an American actress, best known for her roles as Mrs Patricia Gregory on Magic Island, and Mrs Chapman in Howard Hawks' 1951 film, The Thing from Another World.

Creighton worked as a dialogue director for films and as a dramatic coach before she became a film actress.

== Radio ==
- Magic Island as Mrs Patricia Gregory (1935)
- Lux Radio Theatre (1937–39)

== Filmography ==
Year	Title	Role	Notes	Ref.
1951	The Thing from Another World	Mrs Chapman		
1952	Has Anybody Seen My Gal?	Arline Benson		
1954	It's a Great Life	Madame Renee	Episode: "Formal for Amy" (final appearance)	
