= Madame Spy (1942 film) =

1942 film by Roy William Neill

- Directed by: Roy William Neill
- Written by: Clarence Upson Young; Lynn Riggs
- Produced by: Marshall Grant
- Starring: Constance Bennett; Don Porter; John Litel; Edward Brophy
- Cinematography: George Robinson
- Edited by: Ted J. Kent
- Music by: Hans J. Salter
- Production company: Universal Pictures
- Distributed by: Universal Pictures
- Release date: December 11, 1942
- Running time: 63 minutes
- Country: United States
- Language: English

Madame Spy is a 1942 American spy film directed by Roy William Neill and starring Constance Bennett, Don Porter and John Litel. It was produced and distributed by Universal Pictures. The screenplay concerns an American intelligence officer who goes undercover and infiltrates a ring of Nazi spies.

== Plot ==
The film opens with war correspondent David Bannister marrying Joan during an air raid in England. When they return to the U.S., their ocean liner is sunk by a German submarine. They and others escape aboard lifeboats and are rescued.

David becomes a radio reporter and does an exposé on the Nazi connections of an American industrialist who is an associate of Alicia Rolf, Joan's close friend. Peter, the head of a Nazi spy ring, then kills the industrialist to protect the espionage organization. David begins to suspect Joan of having Nazi sympathies, but his friend Lt. Cmdr. Drake defends her. David's suspicions worsen when he discovers Joan has received a telegram telling her about an espionage bombing on the West Coast.

David and his taxicab driver friend, Mike, trail Joan to a meeting with Carl Gordon, who was also a passenger on the sunk liner. David is sure Joan is unfaithful to him. When Drake is killed, newspapers claim he was investigating a Nazi spy ring.

Peter asks Joan to stay with him at his country home, and she agrees. David and Mike follow, and are captured. Before Peter can kill them, he is himself felled by an assassin's bullet. David alerts the FBI to the spy ring, but is told that all the Nazis have already been captured. The agent tells David that Joan and Carl are both American spies, who were working to break the ring. David and Joan reconcile.

== Cast ==
- Constance Bennett as Joan Bannister
- Don Porter as David Bannister
- John Litel as Peter Rolf
- Edward Brophy as Mike Reese
- John Eldredge as Carl Gordon
- Edmund MacDonald as Lt. Cmdr. Bill Drake
- Nana Bryant as Alicia Rolf
- Jimmy Conlin as Winston
- Selmer Jackson as Harrison K. Woods
- Nino Pipitone as Miro
- Cliff Clark as Inspector Varden
- John Dilson as Proprietor Martin

== Bibliography ==
- Milberg, Doris. World War II on the Big Screen. McFarland, 2010.
