= The Cinnamon Bear =

American radio program

Jerrel McQueen and Timothy Holmes illustrated this book published in 2007 by Beautiful America Publishing Company.

The Cinnamon Bear is an old-time radio program produced by Transco (Transcription Company of America), based in Hollywood, California. The series comprised 26 episodes, and was specifically designed to be listened to six days a week between Thanksgiving and Christmas.

The series was first broadcast between Friday, November 26 and Saturday December 25, 1937. Some markets like Portland, Oregon, jumped the gun, debuting the program on November 25, Thanksgiving Day. In the first season, the program was broadcast on two Portland stations, KALE at 6:00 p.m. and KXL at 7:00 p.m.

When syndication problems arose at Transco, the program was not officially broadcast in 1940, although some stations might have aired previous transcriptions. No program aired in Portland that year. In 1941, Transco programming was sold to Broadcasters Program Syndicate, and The Cinnamon Bear was on the air nationally once again. In the 1950s, syndication was taken over by Lou R. Winston, also based in Hollywood.

An original Lipman-Wolfe & Company newspaper ad from the Portland Oregon Journal, November 25, 1937 read:

Introducing Paddy O'Cinnamon, Santa Claus's right-hand man! Meet him with Santa in Toyland at Lipman's... and don't miss his exciting adventures with Judy and Jimmy (two of the nicest playmates you could ever want). and some nights you'll be so anxious to hear how they got the Silver Star back from the wicked Crazyquilt Dragon that you'll listen twice! And here's a secret... the Cinnamon Bear is just as excited about meeting you as he can be.

== Plot ==
The story focused on Judy and Jimmy Barton who go to the enchanted world of Maybeland to recover their missing Silver Star that belongs on their Christmas tree. Helping on the search is the Cinnamon Bear, a stuffed bear with shoe-button eyes and a green ribbon around his neck. They meet other memorable characters during their quest, including the Crazy Quilt Dragon (who repeatedly tries to take the star for himself), the Wintergreen Witch, Fe Fo the Giant and Santa Claus.

Episodes began at Thanksgiving and ended at Christmas, with one episode airing each night. The show was created by a group of merchants as an advertising promotion and was recorded in only a few weeks. It was produced by Lindsay MacHarrie, who also provided the voice of Westley the Whale and several other characters.

== Cast and crew ==
The voice of The Cinnamon Bear was provided by Buddy Duncan, a little person and vaudeville comedian. Many notable radio voices lent their talents, including:

- Barbara Jean Wong as Judy Barton
- Bobby La Manche as Jimmy Barton
- Joseph Kearns as The Crazy-Quilt Dragon
- Verna Felton as Judy & Jimmy's mother
- Lou Merrill as Santa Claus
- Martha Wentworth as The Wintergreen Witch
- Gale Gordon as Weary Willie the Stork and Oliver Ostrich
- Rosa Barcelo as Queen Melissa
- Elvia Allman as Penelope the Pelican
- Joe DuVal as Fe Fo, the Giant
- Frank Nelson as Captain Tin Top
- Hanley Stafford as Snapper Snick, the Crooning Crocodile
- Howard McNear as Samuel the Seal and Slim Pickins, the Cowboy
- Cy Kendall as Captain Taffy, the Pirate, and Chief Cook and Bottle Washer (Indian Chief)
- Ted Osborne as King Blotto the Third and Professor Whiz, the Owl
- Elliott Lewis as Mr. Presto the Magician and Mudley
- Ed Max as the Inkaboo Assistant Executioner
- Dorothy Scott as Fraidy Cat
- Lindsay MacHarrie as Wesley the Wailing Whale, the Grand Wunkey, and others

Radio announcer Bud Hiestand served as the narrator. Lindsay MacHarrie was also the producer of the show.

Both actors Gale Gordon as Weary Willie the Stork and Oliver Ostrich and Joseph Kearns as The Crazy-Quilt Dragon would later go on to work on the 1959 television show Dennis the Menace. Gale Gordon was under contract to play John Wilson (after the death of Joseph Kearns, who played George Wilson) on Dennis the Menace.

For more than 80 years, the identity of the actor who played Jimmy was a mystery, with several actors suggested, including Walter Tetley. In 2021, researcher Karl Schadow found conclusive evidence that Jimmy was played by Bobby La Manche. Schadow published the information in an article in the September 2021 issue of Hollywood360 Newsletter (editor: Carl Amari).

The story and all the songs were written in six weeks' time by Glan Heisch, aided by his wife, Elisabeth A. Heisch (1908–2003). He was specifically directed to create something in the style of The Wonderful Wizard of Oz and Alice's Adventures in Wonderland.

== Public reception ==
The radio show proved to be so popular that the Metropolitan Washington Old-Time Radio Club says it has been broadcast by a station somewhere in the world every year during the holidays, even today. Many malls had a Cinnamon Bear that children would tell what they wanted for gifts instead of a Santa, and he would show up in Christmas parades. The Cinnamon Bear has remained especially popular in Portland, Oregon, which was often cited as a "Cinnamon Bear hotspot".

WDOR-FM radio in Sturgeon Bay, Wisconsin has broadcast The Cinnamon Bear for decades, airing episodes each day at 4pm in the weeks before Christmas

WVIZ-DT9 in Cleveland, Ohio broadcasts The Cinnamon Bear every year from Thanksgiving until Christmas.

International Children's Arts Network (ICAN), in Portland, Oregon broadcasts The Cinnamon Bear every December, daily at Noon and 6 pm (Pacific Time).

WCSF-FM in Joliet, Illinois broadcasts the Cinnamon Bear each December as part of its Spirit of Christmas music marathon, which is broadcast from Thanksgiving Day until January 2.

== Television ==
In 1951, for a Cinnamon Bear television series, the characters were hand puppets, and the radio program provided the soundtrack.

== Books and publications ==
In 1987, upon the 50th anniversary of The Cinnamon Bear, a fan of the show started an annual newsletter called "Bear Facts" and put out by "The Cinnamon Bear Brigade," which ran for five years. The Cinnamon Bear in the Adventure of the Silver Star (2007) by Rick Lewis and Veronica Marzilli was published during the 70th anniversary of The Cinnamon Bear. Jerrel McQueen and Timothy Holmes provided the illustrations.

== Influence ==
Timothy John, a proposed radio serial by Carlton E. Morse, featured a teddy bear who spoke with an Irish accent. As noted by Martin Grams, Jr., Morse's unused plot synopsis was obviously inspired by The Cinnamon Bear.

The former Lipman's department store chain based in Portland, Oregon, was known for its annual Christmas-time appearances of the Cinnamon Bear, a popular Portland tradition from 1937 to the 1990s. The Cinnamon Bear was introduced as a Lipman's-sponsored radio story character, meant to count down the days until Christmas. Along with Santa Claus, his costumed likeness appeared every Christmas at Lipman's stores, handing out cookies to children. Frederick & Nelson continued the practice after acquiring and rebranding the Lipman's chain. The Cinnamon Bear survives today as a souvenir at the Fifth Avenue Suites. To this day, the Cinnamon Bear is aired during the holidays on K103. The Cinnamon Bear radio show can also be heard on Kool 99.1 in Eugene, Oregon every Christmas, and WLCB 101.5FM in Slades Corners, WI every Christmas Eve.

Portland Spirit Cruises & Events (Portland, Oregon) developed the first Cinnamon Bear Cruise in 2005, based on the radio show by Glanville and Elizabeth Heisch's memorable characters and the radio show. After a two year pause due to the COVID-19 pandemic, the cruise celebrated its 19th year in 2024, offering approximately 12 breakfast cruises during the month of December. On board, children of all ages meet Queen Melissa, Cinnamon Bear, Crazy Quilt Dragon, Jack Frost, Captain Taffy, and numerous other magical characters from the radio series.

== Remake ==
Audible released a remake as a serialized podcast from November 29 to December 23, 2021. The remake featured an all-star cast led by Alan Cumming as the Cinnamon Bear.

== See also ==
- Jerry of the Circus
- Land of the Lost
- Magic Island
