= Magic Island (radio series) =

Article about Magic Island on the Panama City News-Herald radio page (December 15, 1940)

Magic Island is an American science-fantasy radio serial syndicated in the late 1930s and 1940s. The series had 130 15-minute episodes, and all episodes have survived.

The storyline followed wealthy Patricia Gregory as she ended her 14-year search in the South Pacific for her long lost daughter Joan. When Joan was one year old, the Gregory yacht was shipwrecked near the 30th parallel south. Lashed to a lifeboat, Joan was presumed lost by all but Patricia. In the opening episode, she receives a tip about a white girl living on a mysterious island populated by scientifically advanced people in the Pacific. After the reunion of mother and daughter, the program dramatized their subsequent adventures on the island, which could submerge to escape detection.

Targeted at a juvenile audience, Magic Island featured Sally Creighton as Patricia Gregory, Rosa Barcelo as Joan Gregory, Tommy Carr as Jerry Hall and Will H. Reynolds as Capt. Tex Bradford.

The producer-writer was Perry (Percy C.) Crandall, who was also a cast member and the program's announcer. Crandall, who had acted in stock companies in the 1920s, was a continuity writer in the early 1930s for Hollywood station KNX, where "Magic Island" was first presented in 1935. He also produced "Si and Elmer", a hayseed amateur detective serial, while there in 1932. He was with San Diego station KBD just before moving in 1937 to Atlas Radio Corp., Hollywood, when it placed Magic Island in syndication. Atlas released the series in that year's transcription-syndication catalog and it continued in trade paper syndication listings for Radio Producers of Hollywood well into the 1940s. Crandall died of pneumonia in January, 1939, at age 38, just as the recorded series was finding an audience as a transcription feature.

== Characters ==
- Mrs. Patricia Gregory (Sally Creighton) – a wealthy widow searching for her shipwrecked daughter, Joan. It is implied in the series that she is a highly connected U.S. government agent.
- Cleostra/Joan Gregory (Rosa Barcelo) – the 15-year-old daughter of Patricia found alive and well on the island of Euclidia.
- Captain Tex Bradford – Mrs. Gregory's right-hand man in her search for Joan. It is implied in the series that he is a highly connected U.S. government agent as well as being an inventor.
- Jerry Hall – the boy who overheard a radio message from Euclidia regarding Joan; accompanies the Gregory party to the Magic Island.
- G-47 – the scientist who rules Euclidia.
- "Girl Submarine Commander"/Elaine (voiced by the same actor as Carmen Bandini in Jerry of the Circus) – the commander of the submarine fleet of Euclidia who becomes a member of the Gregory party during the series.

== Influence ==
The television series Lost has several plot parallels with Magic Island.

== See also ==
- The Cinnamon Bear – another 1930s-era radio program intended for juvenile audiences
- Jerry of the Circus – 1936 series about an orphan boy's adventures with the circus (not the same Jerry as the one in Magic Island). Its sequel was Jerry at Fair Oaks.
- Land of the Lost – 1943–48 radio fantasy

== Listen to ==
- Magic Island in the Internet Archive's Old-Time Radio Collection
