= Enid Kent =

American actress

- Born: 1944 or 1945 (age 81–82)
- Education: San Francisco State College
- Occupation: Actress
- Years active: 1969–1998
- Spouse(s): Hod David Schudson (1974-1980; his death; 1 child)
- Children: 2
- Parent: Irene Tedrow

Enid Kent (born 1944 or 1945) is an American actress.

== Early life and education ==
Kent's mother was Irene Tedrow, a veteran American actress of radio, stage, film and television. When she was 10 years old she portrayed Little Mary in The Women at the Los Palmos Theater. Kent studied at Hollywood High School and at San Francisco State College, where she majored in drama.

== Career ==
She became a television actress and played Nurse Bigelow, a recurring character on M*A*S*H, from 1976 to 1983. She also appeared in such television series as Family Ties, Head of the Class, CHiPs, Diff'rent Strokes, Eight Is Enough, Small Wonder, and L.A. Law. Kent has also appeared on stage.

After she finished college, Kent acted with the American Conservatory Theater. Her Broadway credits include Our Town in 1969. She performed in a revival of The Time of Your Life at the Kennedy Center in 1971.

== Personal life ==
Kent was married to actor, composer, and musician Hod David, who died in an automobile accident in 1980.
