= Joseph Kearns =

American actor (1907–1962)

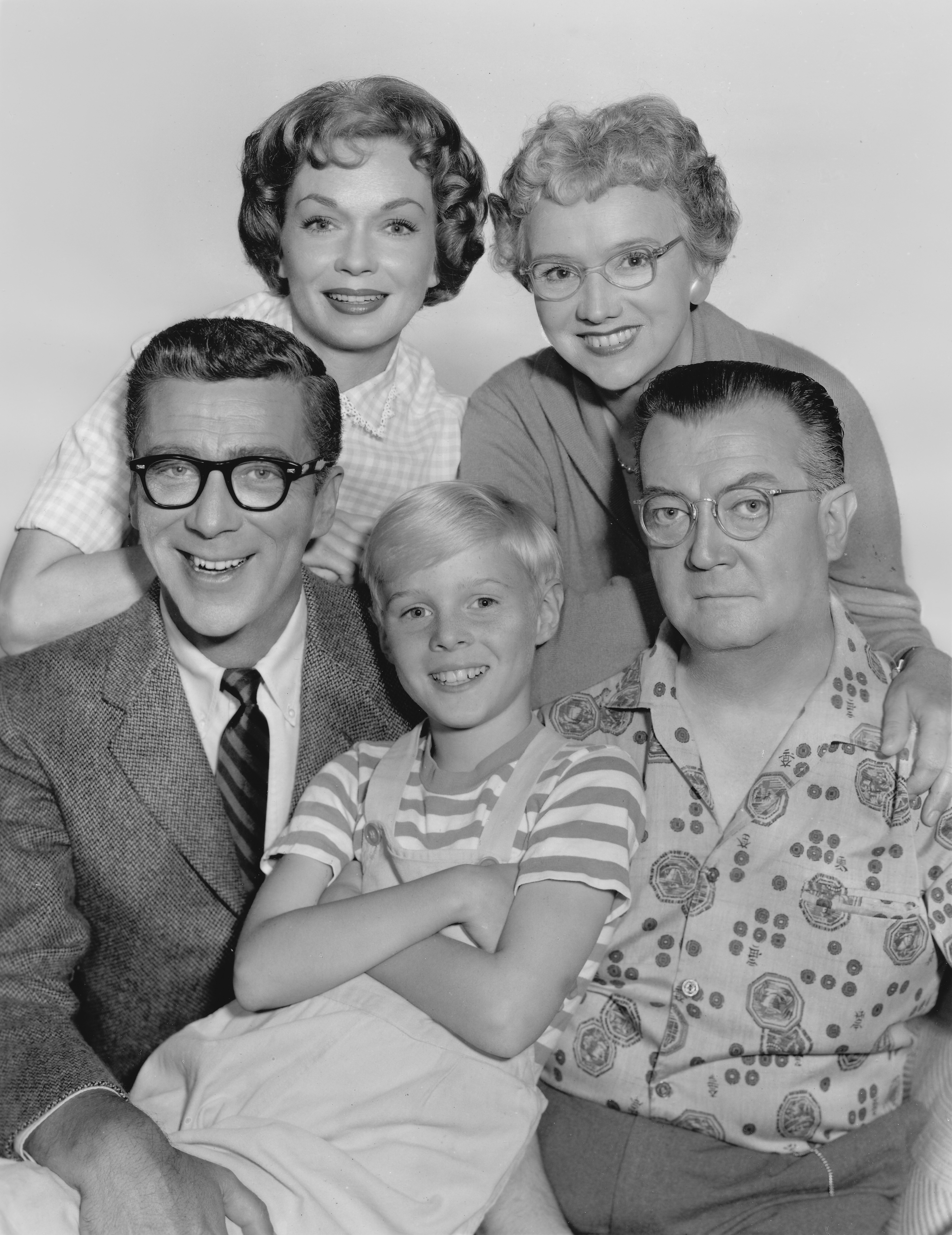
- Kearns (far right) with the cast of TV series Dennis the Menace in 1960
- Born: Joseph Sherrard Kearns; February 12, 1907; Salt Lake City, Utah, U.S.
- Died: February 17, 1962 (aged 55); Los Angeles, California, U.S.
- Resting place: Forest Lawn Memorial Park, Hollywood Hills
- Education: University of Utah
- Occupation: Actor
- Years active: 1916–1962

Joseph Sherrard Kearns (February 12, 1907 – February 17, 1962) was an American actor, who is best remembered for his role as George Wilson ("Mr. Wilson") on the CBS television series Dennis the Menace from 1959 until his death in 1962. He was also a prolific radio actor, and provided the voice of the Doorknob in the 1951 animated Disney film, Alice in Wonderland.

== Early life ==
Joseph Sherrard Kearns was born in Salt Lake City, Utah, the only child of Joseph Albert Kearns, a wool buyer, and Cordelia Marie Peterson, a concert pianist, from whom he derived his love of music. Kearns was 29 years old when his father died, at which time he and his mother moved to California. He and his family were devout Mormons, whose ancestors were Mormon pioneers.

His first acting experience was in 1916 when he joined "The Rising Generation", a vaudeville troupe of eleven children that toured for 14 months.

== Career ==
=== Radio ===
Kearns joined the staff of radio station KSL in Salt Lake City in 1930 remaining there until 1936 when he moved to Los Angeles. He began his acting career in radio in the 1930s (playing the Crazyquilt Dragon in the serial The Cinnamon Bear), becoming active during the 1940s, with appearances on the shows The Adventures of Sam Spade, Burns and Allen, The Whistler, and dozens of other shows. On Suspense, he was almost a mainstay, heard regularly as the host "The Man in Black" in the early years, announcing many episodes in the later run, and playing supporting and occasional lead roles in hundreds of shows throughout the series' tenure in Hollywood, from judges to kindly old-timers to cowards. He also appeared on The New Adventures of Sherlock Holmes, playing various different characters including Professor Moriarty and even Dr. Watson.

=== Film career ===
Kearns made his film debut in Hard, Fast and Beautiful (1951). He was the voice of the Doorknob in Disney's animated film, Alice in Wonderland (1951). Kearns appeared in other movies, making his final film appearance as the crime photographer in Anatomy of a Murder (1959).

=== Television ===
On television, Kearns reprised his radio roles on The Jack Benny Program and also appeared with Eve Arden and Richard Crenna in Our Miss Brooks (1953–55), first as Assistant Superintendent Michaels and later (in eight episodes) as Superintendent Stone, a role that he had played on radio. He appeared on The George Burns and Gracie Allen Show a total of 11 times, The Adventures of Ozzie and Harriet a total of 16 times, I Love Lucy, My Little Margie, Perry Mason, I Married Joan, Willy, December Bride, It's a Great Life, Angel, Gunsmoke (1958 as banker "Mr. Papp" in The Big Con - S3E34), and General Electric Theater.

In 1959, he appeared as criminologist Edward Langley in the Perry Mason episode, "The Case of the Perjured Parrot".

==== Dennis the Menace ====
Kearns' final role was as George Wilson, the grouchy, cantankerous neighbor on CBS's Dennis the Menace based on the comic strip by Hank Ketcham. After his death, Kearns was replaced in the cast by Gale Gordon, who played George Wilson's brother John. Kearns and Gordon had worked together prior to Dennis the Menace, on the old radio show The Cinnamon Bear and in the 1956 film Our Miss Brooks.

In the last episode that aired before Kearns' death, episode 89 entitled "Where There's a Will", the story dealt with Mr. Wilson making out a will and explaining that Dennis would inherit his gold watch when he dies. The last episode Kearns filmed was titled "The Man Next Door", episode 100, and shown on May 6, 1962, three months after his death. There were references to George being 'back east' in subsequent shows.

== Personal life ==
Kearns, who was musically trained by his mother, had played the pipe organ for a Los Angeles theatre in the 1930s. He purchased a Hammond organ and installed it in a studio apartment that he designed and built in the 1940s. He later purchased a larger 18-rank Wurlitzer organ that had been designed for Warner Brothers in 1929. He then designed and built a soundproof 2 1/2-story home around the organ. Kearns delighted in playing the organ for his guests.

== Death ==
Kearns suffered a cerebral hemorrhage on February 11, 1962, during the third season of Dennis the Menace. He was hospitalized in a coma, but never regained consciousness and died on February 17. His death may have been attributed to the Metrecal diet he was on. He had reportedly lost 40 pounds in six weeks. He is buried at the Forest Lawn, Hollywood Hills Cemetery in Los Angeles.

== Selected filmography ==
- The Hucksters (1947) – Radio Voice (uncredited)
- Hard, Fast and Beautiful (1951) – J.R. Carpenter
- Alice in Wonderland (1951) – Doorknob (voice)
- Daddy Long Legs (1955) – Guide (uncredited)
- Our Miss Brooks (1956) – Mr. Stone
- Storm Center (1956) – Mr. Morrisey
- The Girl Most Likely (1958) – Mr. Schlom, Bank Manager (uncredited)
- The Gift of Love (1958) – Mr. Rynicker
- Anatomy of a Murder (1959) – Lloyd Burke
- How to Marry a Millionaire (1957–1959, TV series) – Mr. Augustus P. Tobey
