= Don Porter =

American actor (1912–1997)

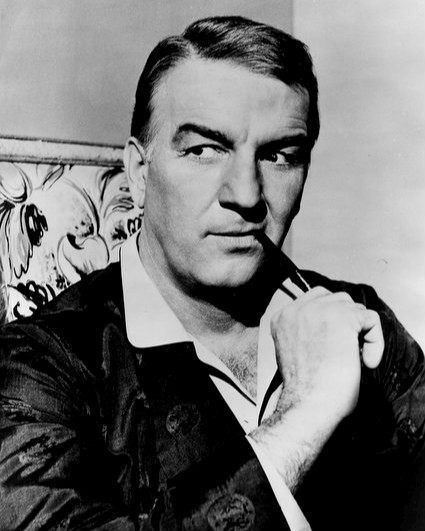
- Porter as Russell Lawrence on the 1965 sitcom Gidget
- Born: Donald Cecil Porter; September 24, 1912; Miami, Oklahoma, U.S.
- Died: February 11, 1997 (aged 84); Beverly Hills, California, U.S.
- Occupation: Actor
- Years active: 1929 – 1988
- Spouse: Peggy Converse (m. 1944)

Donald Cecil Porter (September 24, 1912 – February 11, 1997) was an American stage, film, and television actor.

On television, he played Peter Sands, the boss of Ann Sothern's character on Private Secretary, and Russell Lawrence, the widowed father of 15-year-old Frances "Gidget" Lawrence (Sally Field) in the 1965 ABC sitcom Gidget.

== Life and career ==
Porter was born in Miami, Oklahoma, and as a youth also lived in Nebraska and Oregon. He joined the Oklahoma National Guard at the age of 14, claiming to be 18, and was commissioned a lieutenant. He served as a combat photographer during World War II and also appeared in training films.

Porter's first acting roles came when he was 17, playing dramatic parts on the radio. In 1936, he appeared on stage in Portland in Maxwell Anderson's Elizabeth the Queen. He went on to appear in more than 200 plays. His Broadway credits include The Front Page (1968), Plaza Suite (1967), and Any Wednesday (1963).

He appeared in various films in the 1940s before landing the role of Peter Sands, the boss of Susan Camille MacNamara (Ann Sothern), on the 1950s sitcom Private Secretary. A retooled version of the series appeared later, titled The Ann Sothern Show. It featured many of the same actors, including Porter as hotel manager James Devery in the venue of a fashionable New York City hotel. He later guest-starred on episodes of Barnaby Jones; Green Acres; Hawaii Five-O; Love, American Style; The Mod Squad; The Six Million Dollar Man; Switch and Three's Company (on which he played Jack Tripper's uncle). Porter also had a lucrative stage career that included the long-running hit Any Wednesday (1964) opposite Sandy Dennis and Gene Hackman.

Porter continued to appear in theatrical films after beginning his television career, including The Turning Point (1952), Our Miss Brooks (1956), Gidget Goes to Rome (1963; playing Russell Lawrence two years prior to repeating the role in the series), and Live a Little, Love a Little (1968; starring with Elvis Presley).

In The Candidate (1972), he played Crocker Jarmon, a United States Senator being challenged by a character played by Robert Redford. Commenting on a scene in which Jarmon gave a stirring speech with feigned sincerity, the New Statesman observed that Porter gave "a beautiful performance of Jarman giving a beautiful performance."

Porter played Mr. Upson in the 1974 film adaptation of Mame with Lucille Ball and Bea Arthur. He made his last onscreen appearance in a 1988 episode of CBS Summer Playhouse.

== Personal life and death ==
Porter was married to actress Peggy Converse, with whom he had two children. He died at age 84 in his Beverly Hills, California home on February 11, 1997.

== Filmography ==
=== Film ===
Year	Title	Role	Notes
1939	Mystery of the White Room	Dr. Donald Fox	
1941	Sing for Your Supper	Tim	Uncredited
1942	Top Sergeant	Al Bennett	
1942	Eagle Squadron	Ramsey	
1942	Eyes of the Underworld	Edward Jason	
1942	Night Monster	Dick Baldwin	
1942	Who Done It?	Art Fraser	
1943	Madame Spy	David Bannister	
1943	Keep 'Em Slugging	Jerry	
1944	Resisting Enemy Interrogation	Lieutenant Frank L. Williams, Jr.	Uncredited
1946	She-Wolf of London	Barry Lanfield	Alternative title: The Curse of the Allenbys
1946	Cuban Pete	Roberts	Alternative title: Down Cuba Way
1946	Danger Woman	Professor Claude Ruppert	
1946	Wild Beauty	Dr. Dave Morrow	
1947	Buck Privates Come Home	Captain Christie	Alternative title: Rookies Come Home
1950	My Friend Irma Goes West	Mr. Brent	
1950	711 Ocean Drive	Larry Mason	
1950	Mrs. O'Malley and Mr. Malone	Myron Brynk	
1951	The Racket	R.G. Connolly	
1952	Cripple Creek	Denver Jones	
1952	Because You're Mine	Captain Burton Nordell Loring	
1952	The Savage	Running Dog	Credited as Donald Porter
1952	The Turning Point	Joe Silbray	
1956	Our Miss Brooks	Lawrence Nolan	
1957	Desk Set	Elevator operator Don	Uncredited; Alternative title: His Other Woman
1961	Bachelor in Paradise	Thomas W. Jynson	
1963	Gidget Goes to Rome	Russell Lawrence	
1964	Youngblood Hawke	Ferdie Lax	
1968	Live a Little, Love a Little	Mike Lansdown	With Elvis Presley
1972	The Candidate	Senator Crocker Jarmon	
1973	40 Carats	Mr. Latham	
1974	The Morning After	Rudy King	
1974	Mame	Claude Upson	
1975	White Line Fever	Cutler	
1975	A Woman for All Men	Barney	
1979	Butterflies in Heat	Commodore Phillips	
1980	The Last Song	Philip Brokhurst	TV movie
1985	Joey		Alternative title: Making Contact

=== Television ===
Year	Title	Role	Notes
1953–1957	Private Secretary	Peter Sands	103 episodes
1959–1961	The Ann Sothern Show	James Devery	45 episodes
1965–1966	Gidget	Professor Russell Lawrence	32 episodes
1969	Judd, for the Defense	Frank Vinton	Episode: "Epitaph on a Computer Card"
1971	Green Acres	Manager of Hotel Rexford, Carter	Episode: "Hawaiian Honeymoon" backdoor pilot for sitcom featuring Don Porter
1972	Cade's County	Martin Russell	Episode: "Blackout"
1972	Banacek	Arnold Leeland	Episode: "A Million the Hard Way"
1972	The Rookies	General Brooker	Episode: "A Deadly Velocity"
1973	Hawaii Five-O	Jonathan Cavel-IRS Investigator (The Star in the episode)	Episode: "Murder is a Taxing Affair"
1973	The New Adventures of Perry Mason	Otis Temple	Episode: "The Case of the Deadly Deeds"
1973	Tenafly	Miles	Episode: "The Cash and Carry Caper"
1974	Here's Lucy	Ken Richards	Episode: "Meanwhile, Back At the Office"
1974	The Six Million Dollar Man	Dr. Stanley Bacon	Episode: "Population: Zero"
1974	Chase	Miller	Episode: "Out of Gas"
1974	The F.B.I.	Mason Hammond	Episode: "The Lost Man"
1974	Barnaby Jones	Adam Montgomery	Episode: "Web of Deceit"
1975	Ellery Queen	Gregory Layton	Episode: "The Adventure of Veronica's Veils"
1975	McMillan & Wife	Adrian Danzinger	Episode: "Secrets for Sale"
1976–1977	The Bionic Woman	Dr. James Courtney	3 episodes
1977	Three's Company	Uncle Fremont	Episode: "Jack's Uncle"
1978	The Paper Chase	Franklin Ford II	Episode: "The Man Who Would Be King"
1978	Vega$	Senator William Mitchell	Episode: "The Games Girls Play"
1978	Sword of Justice	Judge Addams	Episode: "Judgement Day"
1978	The Love Boat	Slade Summerhill	Episode: “Gopher the Rebel”
1979	Turnabout	Ed	Episode: "Till Dad Do Us Part"
1980	Dallas	Matt Devlin	4 episodes
1981	Fantasy Island	Emmett Latham	Episode: "Also Rans/Portrait of Solange"
1983	The Love Boat	George Cowens	Episode: "He Ain't Heavy"
1983	Hotel	Jonathan Corry	Episode: "Faith, Hope & Charity"
1986	Matlock	Professor Erskine Tate	Episode: "The Professor"

== Awards and honors ==
Year	Award	Result	Category	Series
1974	Daytime Emmy Award	Nominated	Best Actor in Daytime Drama - For a Special Program	The ABC Afternoon Playbreak
