= Irene Rich Dramas =

Umbrella title for several American radio series

- Country of origin: United States
- Language: English
- Starring: Irene Rich
- Original release: October 4, 1933 – May 28, 1944

Irene Rich Dramas is a title applied to several radio dramatic anthology programs in the United States, some of which had other distinct titles as indicated below. The program was heard on the Blue Network from October 4, 1933, until May 31, 1942, and on CBS from June 5, 1942, until May 28, 1944.

As the title indicates, the programs featured actress Irene Rich, who ventured into radio after encountering a problem with Warner Bros. film studio. Rich's entry on the Encyclopædia Britannica's website describes Rich's career as being "in brief doldrums in 1933", when she began the broadcasts.

== Programs ==
=== Talk with Irene Rich ===
Broadcast on NBC c. 1933, this program had Rich chatting with announcer Norman Ross about news from Hollywood, some of which had been updated via telegraph immediately preceding the broadcast.It was also known as Hollywood with Irene Rich and Behind the Screen.

=== Jewels of Enchantment ===
Beginning on May 23, 1934, Rich starred in a serial, portraying titled Englishwoman who went to the South Seas to try to find her missing fiancé. On January 4, 1935, the format changed to 15-minute self-contained dramas, often with Gale Gordon as Rich's co-star.

=== The Lady Counsellor ===
Rich portrayed Irene Davis, an attorney, in this 15-minue weekly serial that began on April 24, 1936. Her co-star was Carleton Young in the role of a criminal lawyer who was Davis's suitor as well as her rival.

=== Untitled dramas ===
In the latter half of the 1930s, Rich acted in "one-shot dramas" with Ned Wever as her co-star.

=== Glorious One ===
From January 7, 1940, until September 8, 1940, Rich played Judith Bradley, who returned home after five years in a sanitarium only to find that her husband was the subject of Bradley's friend's amorous pursuits. John Lake played the husband, with Larry Nunn and Florence Baker as their children. Pauline Hopkins was the writer.

=== Dear John ===
Rich played Faith Chandler from September 15, 1940, until January 9, 1944. Others in the cast were Ray Montgomery, Betty Moran, Lois Collier, and Norman Field.

=== Woman from Nowhere ===
Rich portrayed "an enigmatic woman" from January 16, 1944, to May 28, 1944. Her character, Eve Hathaway, was a magazine editor who was recovering from amnesia. Herb Allen, Bill Johnstone, and Anne Sloane filled supporting roles. Gerald Mohr was the narrator, and Marvin Miller was the announcer. Ry-Krisp was the sponsor.
