= Jane Morgan (actress) =

American actress

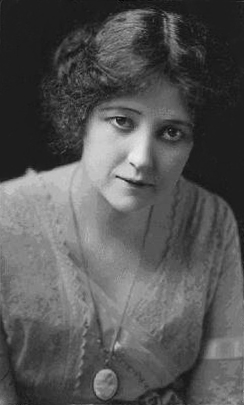
- NYPL Digital Collection
- Born: Jennie Morgan; December 6, 1880; Warmley, Gloucestershire, England
- Died: January 1, 1972 (aged 91); North Hollywood, California, U.S.
- Occupations: Stage, radio and television actress
- Spouse: Leo Cullen Bryant (1901–1955; his death)
- Children: Aline Bryant
- Writing career
- Years active: 1896-1957

Jennie "Jane" Morgan (December 6, 1880 – January 1, 1972) was a British-born American actress and singer whose career encompassed concert halls, vaudeville, the legitimate stage, radio, television, and film, best known as Eve Arden's absentminded landlady Mrs. Davis on the radio and television versions of Our Miss Brooks.

== Early life ==
Morgan was born in Warmley, Gloucestershire to Welsh parents on December 6, 1880, and within a year crossed the Atlantic to be raised in Boston, Massachusetts. Upon her graduation from the New England Conservatory of Music, she began performing with the Boston Opera Company as a singer and violin player earning $25 per week. By 1900, she was living with her widowed father and a brother in Anaconda, Montana, where she became a frequent performer in amateur theatre productions and community events. Her father, Roderick "Rod" Morgan, worked as a blacksmith in Anaconda while her older brother, Charles, supported his family as a machinist.

== Marriage ==
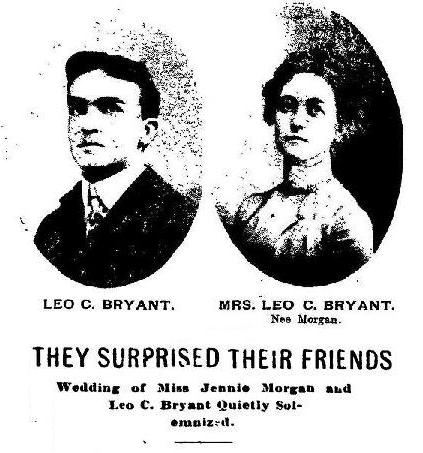
The Anaconda (Montana) Standard (February 19, 1901)

On Sunday, February 17, 1901, she married Leo Cullen Bryant, a 23-year-old native of Albion, Wisconsin, who taught music and headed The Margaret Theatre Orchestra in Anaconda. The following month, the Bryants opened a music school in Butte, Montana, teaching piano and violin.

A few years later, they moved their business to Nampa, Idaho, and shortly thereafter began performing on the vaudeville circuit. Leo Bryant eventually became known as a pioneer symphony violinist and innovative music teacher. The couple had a daughter, Aline (or Alice), and remained together until Leo's death in Los Angeles on March 20, 1955.

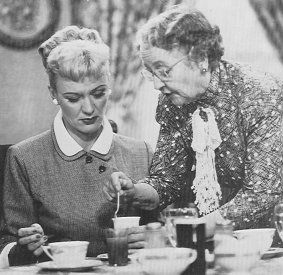
Morgan in an episode of Our Miss Brooks

== Career ==
By the 1910s and probably earlier, Morgan was touring in dramas and musical comedies such as The Master Mind (1914, with Carl Rickert), The Silent Voice (1914, with Otis Skinner), Her Temporary Husband (1926), She Couldn't Say No (1930, with Charlotte Greenwood), and Tattle Tales (1933, with Barbara Stanwyck).

In 1930, she began working on radio plays and series. Jane Morgan became a stock performer on the Lux Radio Theater and was remembered for her work as part of the cast of Point Sublime, and on such radio plays as House Undivided as Mother Adams, The Walls Came Tumbling Down (1941, with Keenan Wynn), and The Horn Blows at Midnight (1949, with Jack Benny). She made regular appearances on the Jack Benny and Bob Hope radio shows, and played Hal Peary's mother on The Harold Peary Show but she was best-known as Mrs. Davis, Eve Arden's motherly landlady on the radio and television versions of Our Miss Brooks.

== Death ==
Morgan retired after the nine-year run of Our Miss Brooks on radio, television, and film came to an end in 1957.

She died at the age of 91 in North Hollywood, California, on New Years Day 1972, after a lengthy battle with heart disease. Morgan was buried at sea in compliance with her last wishes.
