= Our Miss Brooks =

Radio and television series

- Eve Arden as Connie Brooks
- Country of origin: United States
- Language: English
- Starring: Eve Arden; Gale Gordon
- Announcer: Bob LeMond; Verne Smith; Hy Averback
- Created by: Al Lewis
- Written by: Al Lewis
- Directed by: Al Lewis
- Produced by: Larry Berns
- Original release: July 19, 1948 – February 24, 1957

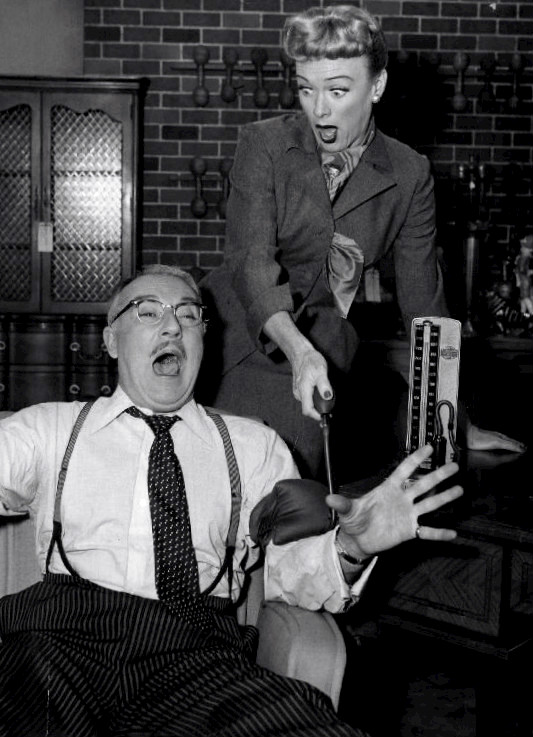
Gale Gordon as Osgood Conklin and Eve Arden as Connie Brooks (1955)

Our Miss Brooks is an American sitcom starring Eve Arden as a sardonic high-school English teacher. It began as a radio show broadcast on CBS from 1948 to 1957. When the show was adapted to television (1952–56), it became one of the medium's earliest hits. In 1956, the sitcom was adapted for the big screen in the film of the same name.

== Characters ==
- Constance "Connie" Brooks (Eve Arden) is an English teacher at fictional Madison High School.
- Osgood Conklin (Gale Gordon) is the gruff and unsympathetic principal of Madison High, a near-constant pain to his faculty and students. (Conklin was played by Joseph Forte in the show's first episode; Gordon succeeded him for the rest of the series' run.) Conklin would often abuse his authority to make teachers work extra hours or perform personal favors for him.
- Philip Boynton (Jeff Chandler on radio, billed sometimes under his birth name Ira Grossel; Robert Rockwell on both radio and television), is a Madison High biology teacher, the shy and often-clueless object of Miss Brooks' affections.
- Walter Denton (Richard Crenna, billed at the time as Dick Crenna), is a Madison High student. He is well intentioned and clumsy with a nasally high-pitched voice which he can disguise when making mischief. He often drives Miss Brooks (his self-professed favorite teacher) to school in a broken-down jalopy. Perfectly aware of Miss Brooks' feelings, he tirelessly tries to help her snare Mr. Boynton, despite the latter's cluelessness.
- Margaret Davis (Jane Morgan), Miss Brooks' absentminded landlady, has two trademarks— a penchant for whipping up exotic and often inedible breakfasts, and a tendency to lose her train of thought midsentence.
- Harriet Conklin (Gloria McMillan) is a Madison High student and daughter of Osgood Conklin. A sometime love interest for Walter Denton, Harriet is sweet, honest, and guileless, unlike her father.
- Martha Conklin (Virginia Gordon) is Osgood's wife and Harriet's mother. She is even-tempered, often having to do damage control for her husband's schemes. She was played by Gale Gordon's real-life wife.
- Fabian "Stretch" Snodgrass (Leonard Smith) is a dull-witted Madison High athletic star and Walter's best friend. For part of the first and the entire second TV season, the character is replaced by Stretch's equally dim brother Bones (Eddie Riley).
- Daisy Enright (Mary Jane Croft) is a Madison High English teacher and a scheming professional and romantic rival to Miss Brooks.
- Minerva is Mrs. Davis' cat. In the radio series, Minerva had the habit of sleeping inside Mrs. Davis' parlor piano, leading to a running gag of an impressive piano riff anytime something startled her awake.

== Radio ==
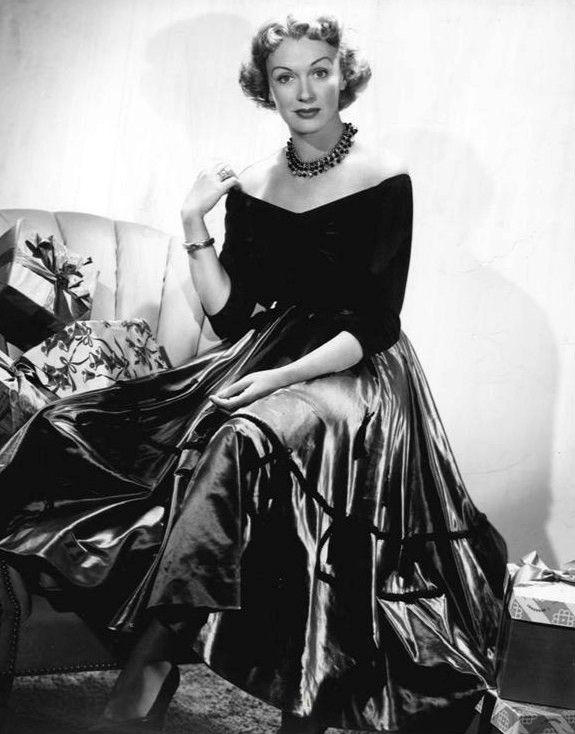
Eve Arden from the CBS Radio version of Our Miss Brooks (1949)

Our Miss Brooks was a hit on radio from the outset; within eight months of its launch as a regular series, the show landed several honors, including four for Eve Arden, who won polls in four individual publications of the time. Arden had actually been the third choice to play the title role. Harry Ackerman, at the time CBS's West Coast director of programming, wanted Shirley Booth for the part, but as he told historian Gerald Nachman many years later, he realized Booth was too focused on the underpaid downside of public school teaching at the time to have fun with the role. Lucille Ball was believed to have been the next choice, but she was committed to My Favorite Husband and did not audition. CBS then-chairman Bill Paley, who was friendly with Arden, persuaded her to audition for the part. With a slightly rewritten audition script—Osgood Conklin, for example, was originally written as a school board president, but was now written as the incoming new Madison principal—Arden agreed to give the newly revamped show a try.

Produced by Larry Berns and written by director Al Lewis, Our Miss Brooks premiered on CBS on July 19, 1948. According to radio critic John Crosby, her lines were very "feline" in dialogue scenes with principal Conklin and would-be boyfriend Boynton, with sharp, witty comebacks. The interplay between the cast—blustery Conklin, nebbishy Denton, accommodating Harriet, absentminded Mrs. Davis, clueless Boynton, and scheming Miss Enright—also received positive reviews.

Jeff Chandler played Boynton and stayed with the role for five years, even after becoming a movie star. He ultimately resigned because it was too exhausting to juggle a regular radio role with his film commitments. Others in the cast included Anne Whitfield as Conklin's daughter, Harriet.

For its entire radio life, the show was sponsored by Colgate-Palmolive-Peet, promoting Palmolive soap, Lustre Creme shampoo, and Toni hair-care products. The radio series continued until 1957, a year after its television life ended. This content is now available for download at the Internet Archive.

== Television ==
Our Miss Brooks
- Logo from the syndicated edition
- Genre: Sitcom
- Starring: Eve Arden; Gale Gordon; Robert Rockwell; Jane Morgan; Richard Crenna; Gloria McMillan
- Composer: Wilbur Hatch
- Country of origin: United States
- Original language: English
- No. of seasons: 4
- No. of episodes: 130 (list of episodes)

Production
- Executive producer: Desi Arnaz (uncredited)
- Producer: Larry Berns
- Production locations: Desilu Studios, Los Angeles
- Camera setup: Multi-camera
- Running time: 23–26 minutes
- Production companies: Desilu Productions; CBS Productions

Original release
- Network: CBS
- Release: October 3, 1952 – May 11, 1956

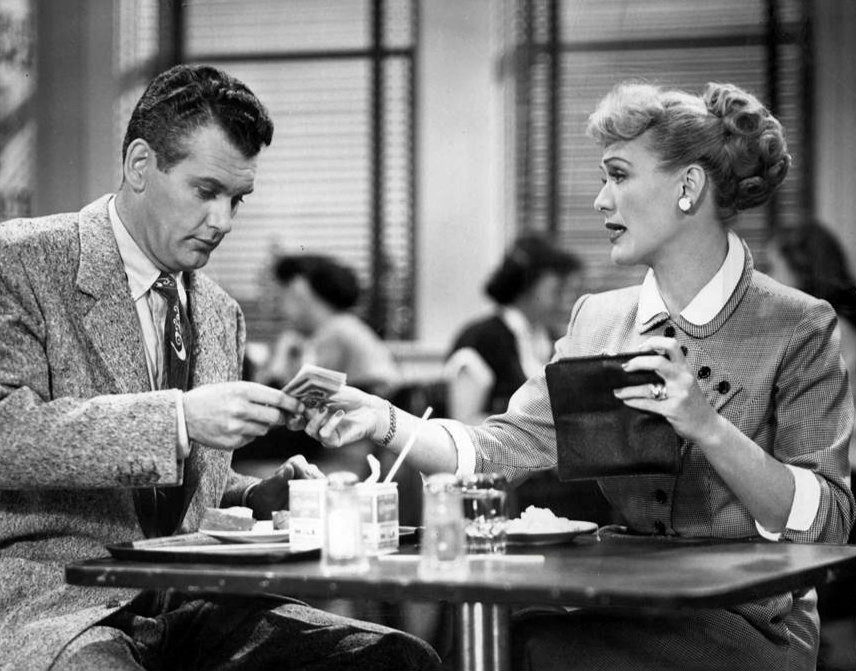
Mr. Boynton (Robert Rockwell) borrows money from Connie.

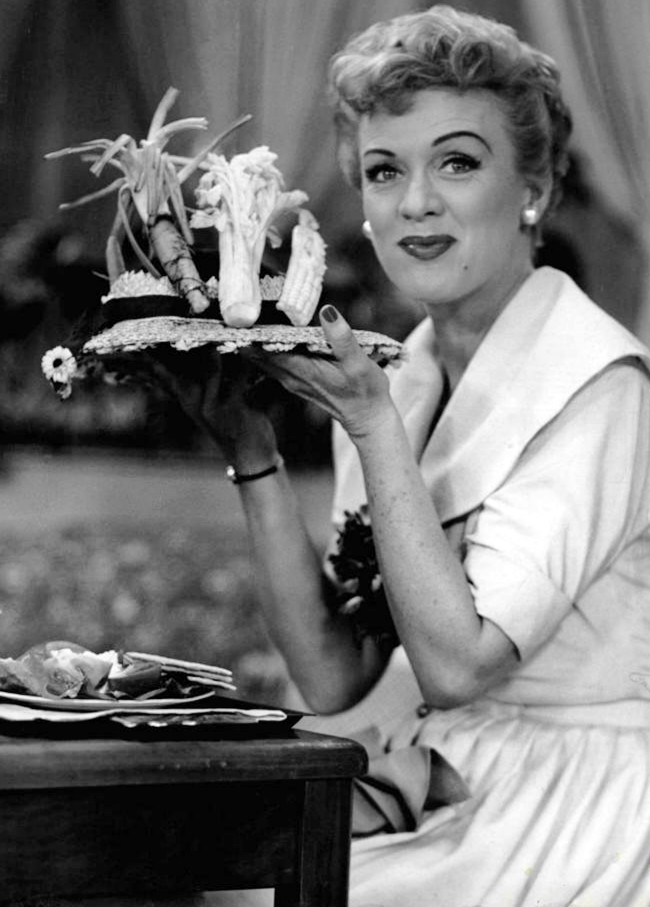
Connie said she would eat her hat if Boynton took her out and paid the whole tab. When he did, she prepared to do that.

When Mr. Conklin accidentally glued his hand to his desk, Miss Brooks tried to help, 1952.

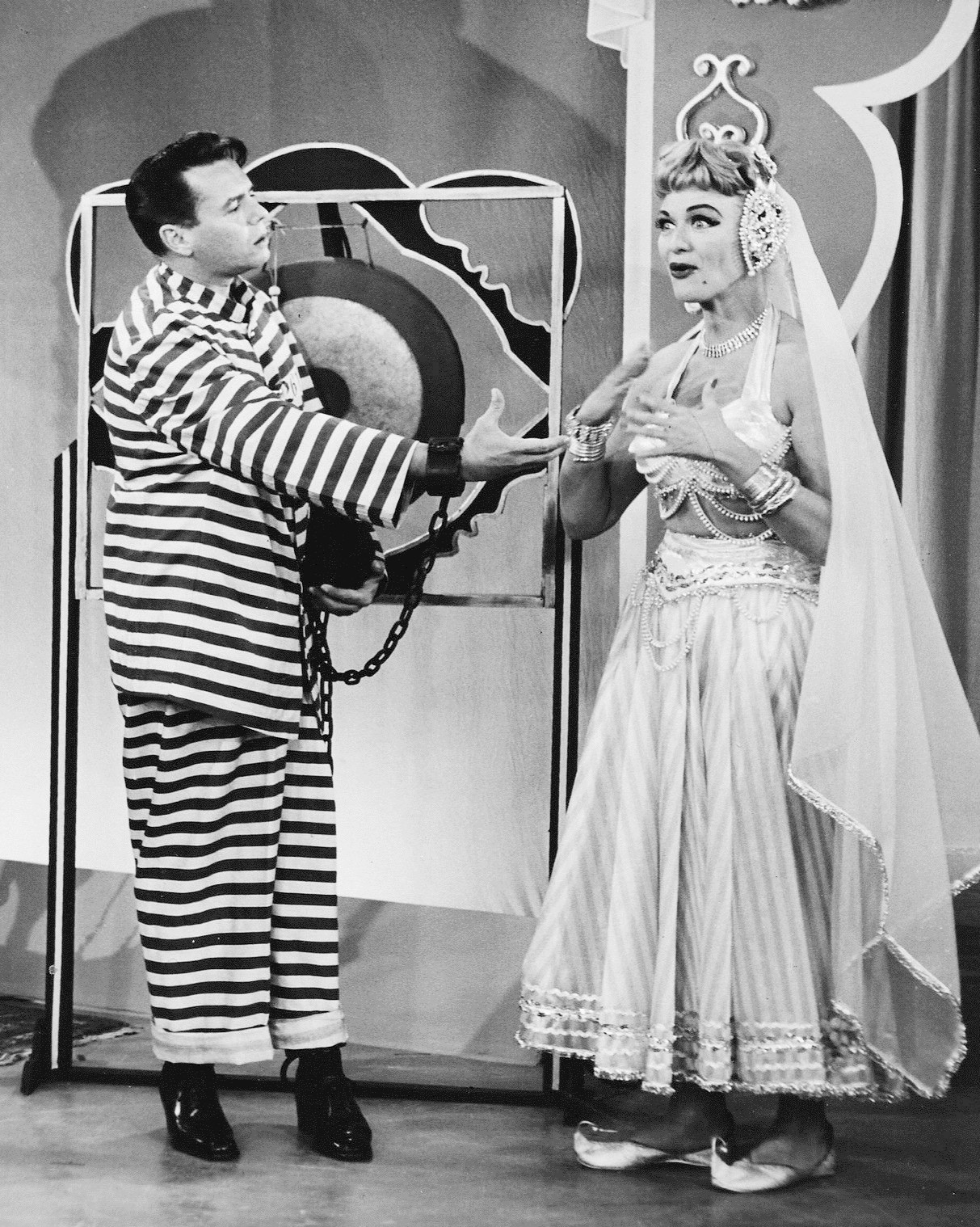
Guest star Desi Arnaz and Eve Arden in episode "The King and Brooks" (1955)

The show's full cast, minus Jeff Chandler, played the same characters in the television version (with most of the scripts adapted from radio), which continued to revolve largely around Connie Brooks' daily relationships with Madison High students, colleagues, and principal. Philip Boynton was played by Robert Rockwell, who also succeeded Jeff Chandler on the radio series. The television show, sponsored by General Foods, shifted focus later in its run, moving Connie Brooks and Osgood Conklin from a public high school to an exclusive private school in the fall of 1955. It also changed the title character's romantic focus; Gene Barry was cast as physical education teacher Gene Talbot, and Connie was now the pursued instead of the pursuer, although Mr. Boynton reappeared in several episodes before the season ended.

Our Miss Brooks finished in Nielsen ratings that season at number 15 overall after previously ranking at number 23 in 1952–1953 and number 14 in 1953–1954. For the 1955–56 season, with the format change and Rockwell (as Boynton) replaced by Gene Barry, the ratings fell. To rectify their mistake, the producers brought back Rockwell as Boynton in midseason, but it did not help. The show was cancelled in the spring of 1956. However, in the theatrical film Our Miss Brooks released by Warner Bros. in the same year, Connie and Mr. Boynton were finally engaged to be married. The film disregarded the format change of the final television season, concluding Miss Brooks' story at Madison High School.

== Awards ==
Both the radio and television shows drew as much attention from professional educators as from radio and television fans, viewers, and critics. In addition to the 1948–49 poll of Radio Mirror listeners and the 1949 poll of Motion Picture Daily critics, Arden's notices soon expanded beyond her media. According to the Museum of Broadcast Communications, she was made an honorary member of the National Education Association and received a 1952 award from the Teachers College of Connecticut's Alumni Association "for humanizing the American teacher".

Our Miss Brooks was considered groundbreaking for showing a woman who was neither a scatterbrained klutz nor a homebody, but rather a working woman who transcended the actual or assumed limits to women's working lives of the time. Connie Brooks was considered a realistic character in an unglamorized profession (she often joked, for example, about being underpaid, as many teachers are), and who showed women could be competent and self-sufficient outside their home lives without losing their femininity or their humanity.

Our Miss Brooks remained Eve Arden's most identifiable and popular role, with numerous surviving recordings of both the radio and television versions continuing to entertain listeners and viewers. (The surviving radio recordings include both its audition shows.) A quarter century after the show ended, Arden told radio historian John Dunning in an on-air interview just what the show and the role came to mean to her:

I originally loved the theater. I still do. And I had always wanted to have a hit on Broadway that was created by me. You know, kind of like Judy Holliday and Born Yesterday. I griped about it a little, and someone said to me, "Do you realize that if you had a hit on Broadway, probably 100 or 200,000 people might have seen you in it, if you'd stayed in it long enough. And this way, you've been in Miss Brooks, everybody loves you, and you've been seen by millions." So, I figured I'd better shut up while I was ahead.

=== Television cast ===
- Eve Arden as Connie Brooks
- Gale Gordon as Osgood Conklin
- Robert Rockwell as Phillip Boynton
- Jane Morgan as Margaret Davis
- Jesslyn Fax as Margaret Davis's sister, Angela Devon
- Richard Crenna as Walter Denton
- Gloria McMillan as Harriet Conklin
- Isabel Randolph as Ruth Nestor, principal of Miss Brooks' new school beginning in "Big Ears" (November 4, 1955).
- Joseph Kearns as Superintendent Stone (eight episodes)
- William Ching as Clint Allbright (four episodes)
- Gene Barry as Gene Talbot
- Orangey as Minerva the cat

== List of television episodes ==
Season	Episodes	Originally released		Rank	Rating	Households (millions)
Season	Episodes	First released	Last released	Rank	Rating	Households (millions)
1	38	October 3, 1952	June 26, 1953	22	35.0 (Note: Tied with The Big Story)	7.14
2	31	October 2, 1953	June 18, 1954	14	34.2	8.89
3	30	October 1, 1954	June 3, 1955	—N/a	—N/a	—N/a
4	31	October 7, 1955	May 11, 1956	—N/a	—N/a	—N/a

== Home media ==
On October 16, 2019, CBS Home Entertainment released the first season of 38 episodes on DVD (for Region 1) as a two-volume set (with 19 episodes in each volume). The episodes are not the original 26-minute broadcasts, but rather shortened syndicated versions of approximately 21 minutes each. In addition, the original opening and closing credits have been replaced by a single standardized version, eliminating all guest cast and additional crew member information.

== Syndication ==
In the 1980s, various independent television stations would air episodes during afternoons and late nights.

Episodes from the series aired on MeTV. Currently, the show airs on their sister network Catchy Comedy.

Tubi has several episodes in their library.
