= Gale Gordon =

American actor (1906–1995)

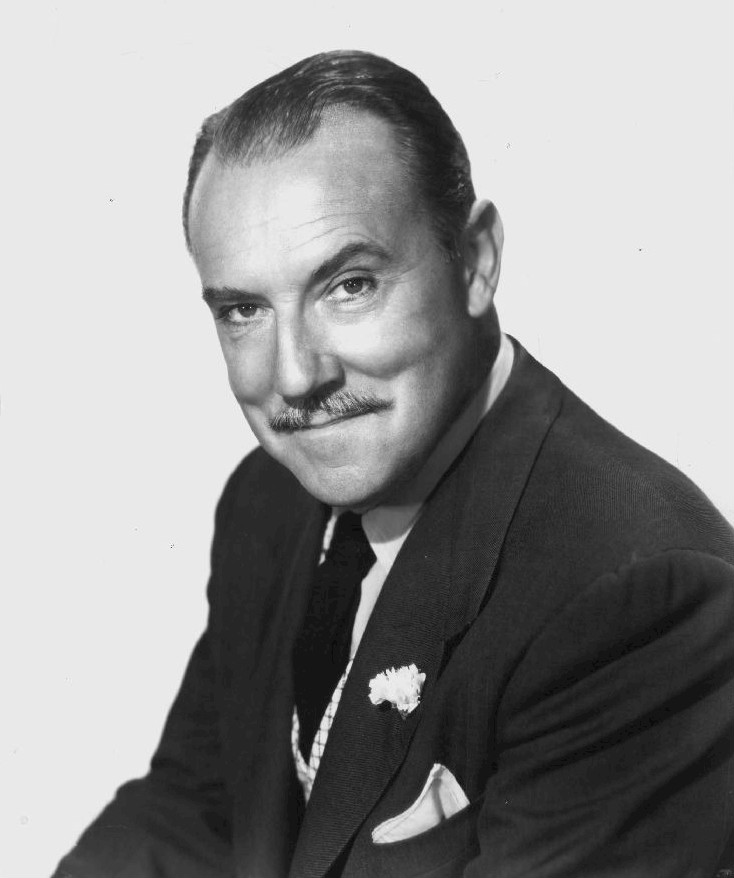
- Gordon in 1958
- Born: Charles T. Aldrich Jr. February 20, 1906; New York City, U.S.
- Died: June 30, 1995 (aged 89); Escondido, California, U.S.
- Occupation: Actor
- Years active: 1923–1991
- Spouse: Virginia Curley (m. 1937; died 1995)

Gale Gordon (born Charles Thomas Aldrich Jr.; February 20, 1906 – June 30, 1995) was an American character actor who was Lucille Ball's longtime television foil, particularly as cantankerously combustible, tightfisted bank executive Theodore J. Mooney, on Ball's second television sitcom The Lucy Show. Gordon also appeared in I Love Lucy and had starring roles in Ball's successful third series Here's Lucy and her short-lived fourth and final series Life with Lucy.

Gordon was also a radio actor who played school principal Osgood Conklin in Our Miss Brooks, starring Eve Arden, in both the 1948–1957 radio series and the 1952–1956 television series. He also co-starred as the second Mr. Wilson in Dennis the Menace, replacing Joseph Kearns after he died.

== Early life ==
Charles Thomas Aldrich Jr. was born on February 20, 1906, in New York City, the first child and only son of American quick change artist Charles Thomas Aldrich and English actress Bertha Wilson, who adopted the stage names Jewel St. Ledger, and later, Gloria Gordon. The couple had met while performing in separate shows in London, and married the prior year in Detroit. The elder Aldrich was on tour at the time of his birth, introducing his son to the audience at eight days old.

When her son was fifteen months old, Gordon discovered he had been born with a cleft palate and arranged for surgery in London to correct it. Aldrich and Gordon both pushed their son into the acting/vaudeville profession to combat velopharyngeal insufficiency. This speech therapy developed the distinct diction that he later became known for. The Aldriches, which included daughter Jewel (1908–1998), constantly rotated between London, New York, and Charles Sr.'s hometown of Cleveland, Ohio. The family permanently settled in New York in 1915.

Charles Aldrich and Gloria Gordon divorced in 1919, after which Aldrich bought a farm in rural New Jersey and retained custody of their children. He remarried Elizabeth Smalley in 1921, with whom he had another son Atwood Aldrich. By 1923, Charles Jr. had joined his mother in New York and adopted the stage name Gale Gordon to match hers.

== Career ==
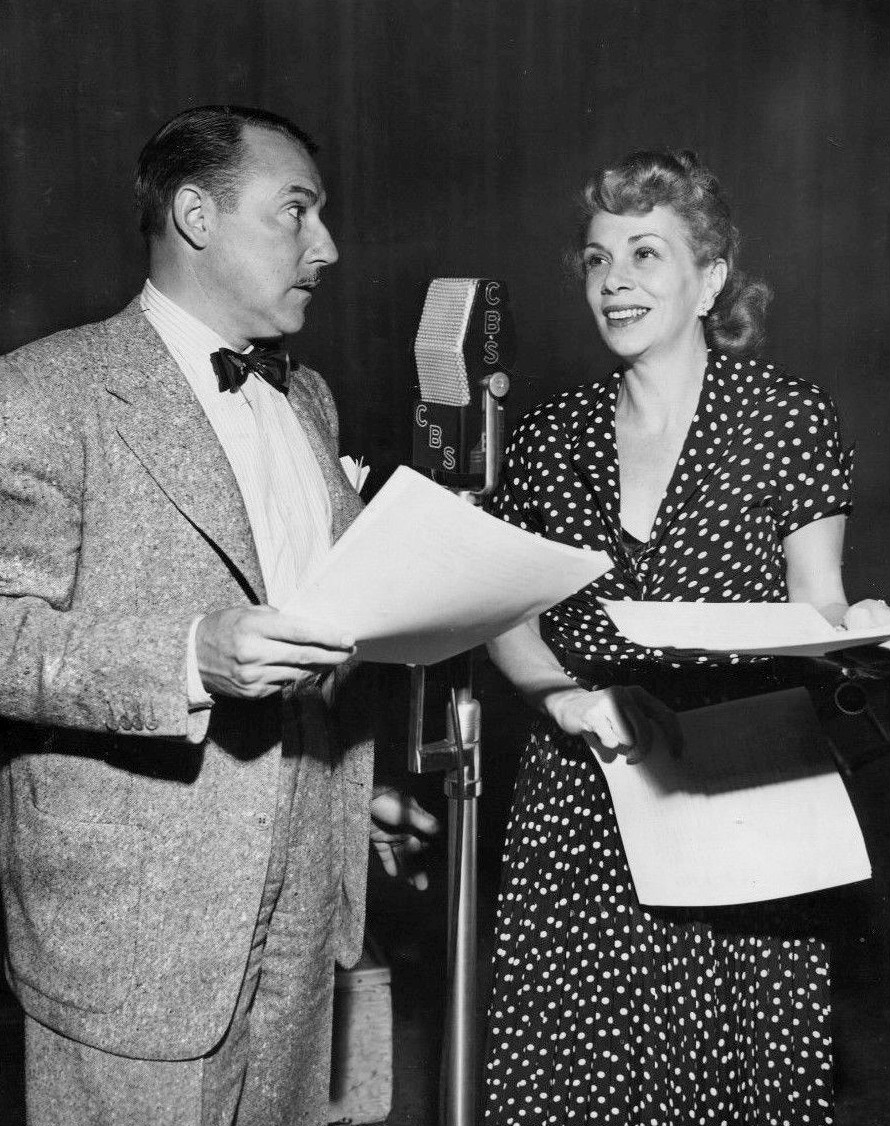
Gordon and Bea Benaderet in the 1950 summer replacement radio show Granby's Green Acres

=== Radio ===
He was the first actor to play the role of Flash Gordon, in the 1935 radio serial The Amazing Interplanetary Adventures of Flash Gordon. He also played Dr. Stevens in Glorious One.

From 1937 to 1939, he starred as "The Octopus" in the Speed Gibson adventure series.

Gale Gordon's first big radio break came via the recurring roles of "Mayor La Trivia" and "Foggy Williams" on Fibber McGee and Molly, before playing Rumson Bullard on the show's successful spinoff, The Great Gildersleeve. Gordon and his character of Mayor La Trivia left the show during World War II when Gordon enlisted in the US Coast Guard from 1942 to 1945 rising to Gunner's Mate 1st Class.

In 1949, Gordon recorded the pilot for The Halls of Ivy, starring in the program's title role of Dr. Todhunter Hall, the president of Ivy College. The pilot led to a radio series that aired from 1950 to 1952, but Ronald Colman replaced Gordon in the title role; Gordon later joined the cast as a replacement for Willard Waterman in the popular role of John Merriweather.

Gordon, in one of his few dramatic roles on radio, starred as erudite art importer, suave bachelor, and amateur sleuth Gregory Hood on The Casebook of Gregory Hood in 1946–47 on the Mutual Broadcasting Network. The show followed the same format—same sponsor, same writers, same storytelling formula—as the program it was originally a summer replacement for, The New Adventures of Sherlock Holmes. The Gregory Hood program was continued on the fall schedule for the subsequent season after the network failed to reach a contractual agreement with the estate of Sir Arthur Conan Doyle for the Sherlock Holmes franchise. It was cancelled by Mutual after one full season, but returned periodically on ABC in 1948 and following years, with other actors playing the title role.

In 1950, Gordon played John Granby, a former city dweller ineptly pursuing his dream of life on a farm, in the radio series Granby's Green Acres, which became the basis for the 1960s television series Green Acres. Gordon went on to create the role of pompous principal Osgood Conklin on Our Miss Brooks, carrying the role to television when the show moved there in 1952. In the interim, Gordon turned up as Rudolph Atterbury on My Favorite Husband, which starred Lucille Ball in a precursor to I Love Lucy.

Gordon and Ball had previously worked together on The Wonder Show, starring Jack Haley, from 1938 to 1939. The two had a long friendship as well as recurring professional partnership. Gordon also had a recurring role as fictitious Rexall Drugs sponsor representative Mr. Scott on yet another radio hit, The Phil Harris-Alice Faye Show, staying with the role as long as Rexall sponsored the show. When the sponsor changed to RCA, the character simply switched employers.

=== Television ===
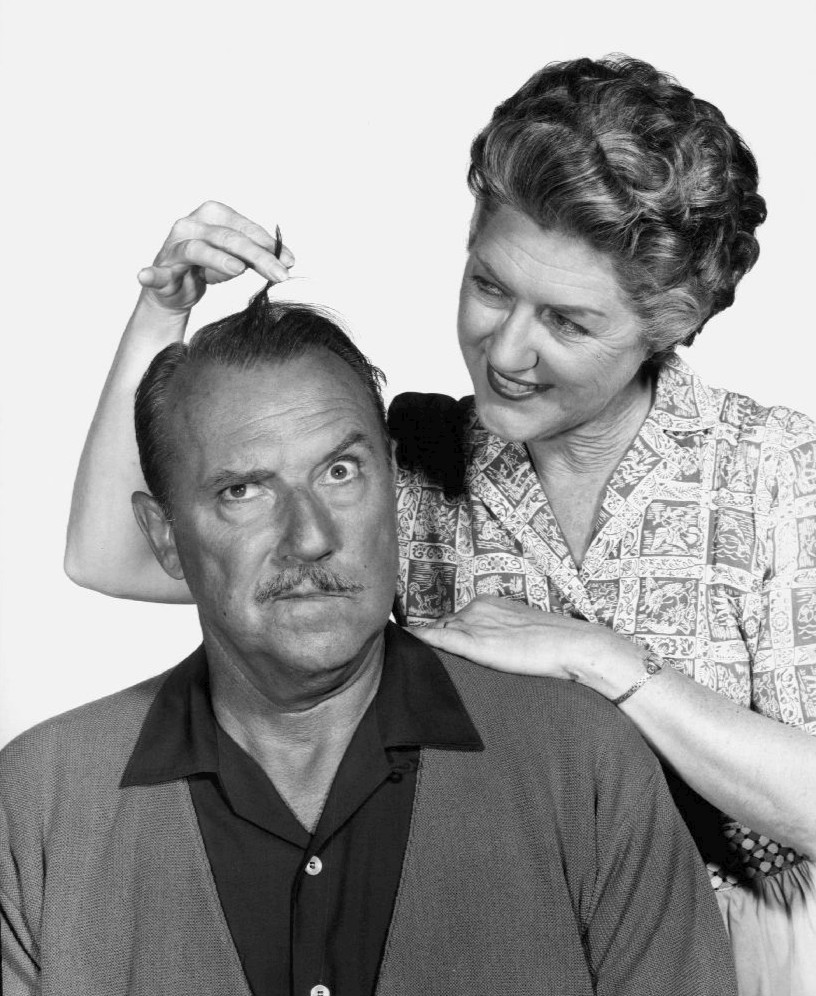
Gordon and Sara Seegar in Dennis the Menace (1963)

The widely acknowledged master of the "slow-burn" temper explosion in character, Gordon was the first pick to play Fred Mertz on I Love Lucy, but he was committed to Our Miss Brooks as well as being a regular on several other radio shows, and had to decline the offer (the role went to William Frawley). He appeared in two guest shots on the show: twice as Ricky Ricardo's boss, Alvin Littlefield, owner of the Tropicana Club where Ricky's band played, and later appeared as a judge on an episode of Lucy-Desi Comedy Hour.

In 1958, Gordon appeared as a regular in the role of department store co-owner Bascomb Bleacher Sr., on the NBC sitcom Sally, starring Joan Caulfield and Marion Lorne. He also appeared on the Walter Brennan ABC sitcom, The Real McCoys. Gordon had a co-starring role in the CBS television comedy Pete and Gladys. At this time, he guest starred with Pat O'Brien in the ABC sitcom, Harrigan and Son, the story of a father-and-son lawyer team. He also appeared on the CBS/Desilu sitcom, Angel, with Annie Fargé. On The Danny Thomas Show, he guest starred in seven episodes. In five, he played the landlord of the building where the Williams family lived. In 1962, Gordon appeared as different characters on two episodes of another ABC sitcom, The Donna Reed Show.

In 1962, Ball created The Lucy Show and planned to hire Gordon to play Theodore J. Mooney, the banker who was first Lucy Carmichael's executor and subsequently her employer, when she went to work in his bank. Gordon was under contract to play John Wilson (after the death of Joseph Kearns, who played George Wilson) on Dennis the Menace. Prior to Gordon's replacing Kearns on Dennis the Menace, the two had worked together on an old radio show, The Cinnamon Bear and also appeared with Eve Arden and Richard Crenna in Our Miss Brooks (1953–55), where Kearns first played Assistant Superintendent Michaels and later (in eight episodes) as Superintendent Stone, a role that he had played on radio.

When Dennis the Menace ended in spring 1963, Gordon joined The Lucy Show as Mr. Mooney for the 1963–64 season. (In the interim, Charles Lane had played the similar Mr. Barnsdahl character for the 1962–1963 season.) The somewhat portly Gordon was surprisingly adept at physical comedy and could do a perfect cartwheel; he did this on The Lucy Show and Here's Lucy, and again as a guest on The Dean Martin Show.

After the sale of Desilu Studios in 1968, Ball shut down The Lucy Show and retooled it into Here's Lucy and became her own producer and distributor. Gordon returned, this time as her blustery boss (and brother-in-law) Harrison Otis 'Uncle Harry' Carter at an employment agency that specialized in unusual jobs for unusual people. Essentially, it was just a continuation of the Lucy Carmichael/Mr. Mooney relationship, but with new names and a new setting.

Gordon had all but retired from acting when Here's Lucy ended in 1974, but Ball coaxed him out of retirement in 1986 to join her for the short-lived series Life with Lucy. Gordon was the only actor to have co-starred or guest-starred in every weekly series, radio or television, Ball had done since the 1940s. His final acting appearance would be a reprise of Mr. Mooney in the first episode of Hi Honey, I'm Home! in 1991.

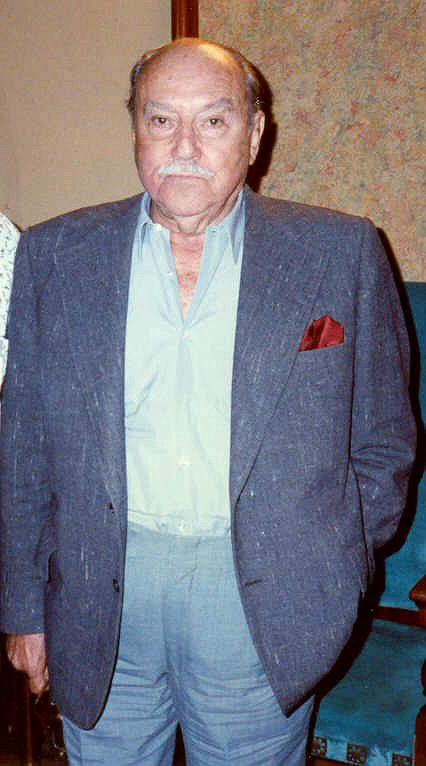
Gordon in 1988

Beginning in 1949, Gordon and his wife lived in the tiny community of Borrego Springs, California (pop. 1,500) where he owned a ranch and several dogs. He was also honorary mayor of the town and commuted approximately 160 mi (260 km) to and from Los Angeles every day when working for Ball.

=== Author, painter and rancher ===
In addition to acting, Gordon was an accomplished author, penning two books in the 1940s titled Nursery Rhymes for Hollywood Babies and Leaves from the Story Trees, and two one-act plays. After he and his wife purchased 150 acres (61 ha) in Borrego Springs, Gordon did much of the construction of the house and his art studio himself. He also built and restored his own furniture on the property and used the land to become one of the few commercial carob growers in the United States.

Gale Gordon: From Mayor of Wistful Vista to Borrego Springs, by Jim Manago, published by BearManor Media in 2016, is the first biography of Gordon.

== Death ==
Gordon died of lung cancer on June 30, 1995, at the Redwood Terrace Health Center in Escondido, California, aged 89. Virginia Curley, his wife of nearly 60 years, had died in the same facility one month earlier. The couple had no children.

== Awards ==
In 1999, Gordon was inducted posthumously into the Radio Hall of Fame, was nominated for four Primetime Emmy Awards, and for his contributions to radio he was the recipient of a star on the Hollywood Walk of Fame at 6340 Hollywood Boulevard.

== Roles ==
- 1942 Here We Go Again as Otis Cadwalader
- 1948–1951 My Favorite Husband (TV series) as Mr. Rudolph Atterbury (On Radio)
- 1950 A Woman of Distinction
- 1952 Here Come the Nelsons as H.J. Bellows
- 1952 I Love Lucy (two episodes) as Mr. Alvin Littlefield
- 1953 Francis Covers the Big Town as District Attorney Evans
- 1952–1956 Our Miss Brooks (TV series) as Osgood Conklin (also on radio)
- 1956 Our Miss Brooks (Film) as Osgood Conklin
- 1956 Climax! as Dr. Raymond Forrest
- 1956-1957 The Box Brothers as Harvey Box
- 1957–1958 Playhouse 90 as Ed Keller
- 1958 Studio One as R.J. Fuller
- 1958 The Lucy–Desi Comedy Hour as Judge
- 1958 Rally 'Round the Flag, Boys! as Brigadier General W.A. Thorwald
- 1959 Don't Give Up the Ship as Congressman Mandeville
- 1959 The Real McCoys as P.T. Kirkland (one episode)
- 1959 The 30 Foot Bride of Candy Rock as Raven Rossiter
- 1960 Visit to a Small Planet as Bob Mayberry
- 1961 All Hands on Deck as Commander Bintle
- 1961 All in a Night's Work as Oliver Dunnin
- 1961 Harrigan and Son as Merril Davis
- 1960–1962 Pete and Gladys (TV series) as Uncle Paul Porter
- 1962–1963 Dennis the Menace (TV series) as John Wilson
- 1965 Sergeant Deadhead as Captain Weiskopf
- 1967 The Danny Thomas Hour (TV series) as Baxter
- 1963–1968 The Lucy Show (TV series) as Mr. Theodore J. Mooney
- 1968 Speedway as R.W. Hepworth
- 1968–1974 Here's Lucy (TV series) as Harrison Otis Carter
- 1977 Lucy Calls the President (TV movie) as Omar Whittaker
- 1977 The Honeymooners Christmas Special (TV movie) as Ralph's Boss
- 1986 Life with Lucy as Curtis McGibbon
- 1989 The 'Burbs as Walter Seznick
- 1991 Hi Honey, I'm Home! as Mr. Theodore J. Mooney
- 1991 The New Lassie as Horace Peterson
