= Eve Arden =

American actress (1908–1990)

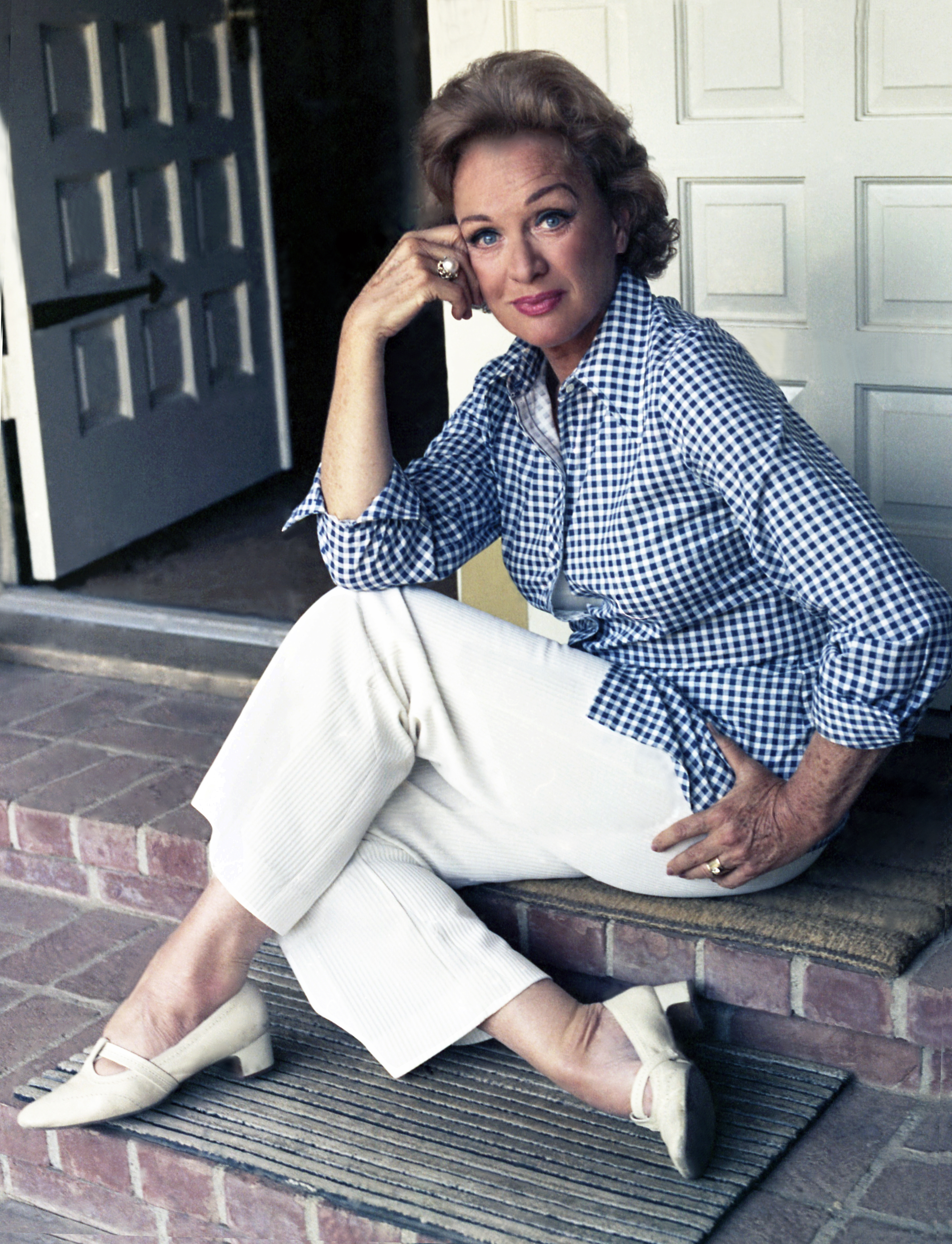
- Arden in 1972, by Allan Warren
- Born: Eunice Mary Quedens; April 30, 1908; Mill Valley, California, U.S.
- Died: November 12, 1990 (aged 82); Beverly Hills, California, U.S.
- Resting place: Westwood Village Memorial Park Cemetery
- Occupation: Actress
- Years active: 1929–1987
- Spouses: Edward Grinnell Bergen (m. 1939; div. 1947) Brooks West (m. 1952; died 1984)
- Children: 4

Eve Arden (born Eunice Mary Quedens, April 30, 1908 – November 12, 1990) was an American film, radio, stage and television actress. She performed in leading and supporting roles for nearly six decades.

Beginning her film career in 1929 and on Broadway in the early 1930s, Arden's first major role was in the RKO Radio Pictures drama Stage Door (1937) opposite Katharine Hepburn, followed by roles in the comedies Having Wonderful Time (1938) and At the Circus (1939). She received an Academy Award nomination for Best Supporting Actress for her role in Mildred Pierce (1945).

Despite her starring in many comedic roles, Arden appeared in several films noir productions which includes high-profile titles such as Mildred Pierce, The Unfaithful (1947), The Arnelo Affair (1947), Whiplash (1948), and Anatomy of a Murder (1959).

Later in her career, Arden moved to television, playing a sardonic but engaging high school teacher in Our Miss Brooks, for which she won the first Primetime Emmy Award for Outstanding Lead Actress in a Drama Series. She also played the maternity ward nurse in Bewitched and the school principal in the film musicals Grease (1978) and Grease 2 (1982).

== Early life ==
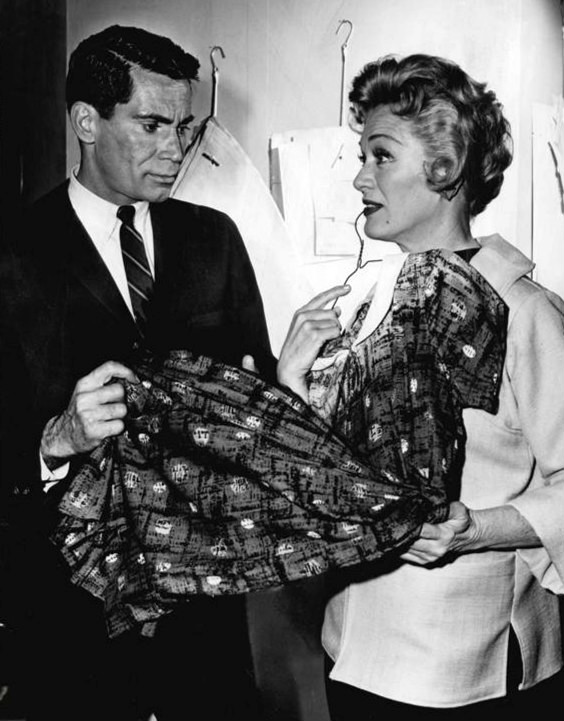
Anthony George and Arden in "Death by Design", Checkmate (1961)

Eve Arden was born Eunice Mary Quedens in Mill Valley, California, of mostly German descent, to Charles Peter Quedens, the son of Charles Henry Augustus Quedens and Eunice Meta Dierks, and Lucille Frank, the daughter of Bernard Frank and Louisa Mertens. Lucille, a milliner, divorced Charles over his gambling and went into business for herself.

Although not Catholic, young Eunice was sent to a Dominican convent school in San Rafael, California. She then attended Tamalpais High School, a public high school in Mill Valley, until age 16. After leaving school, she joined the stock theater company of Henry "Terry" Duffy.

== Career ==
=== Film ===
She made her film debut under her real name in the backstage musical Song of Love (1929), as a wisecracking, homewrecking showgirl who becomes a rival to the film's star, singer Belle Baker. The film was one of Columbia Pictures' earliest successes. In 1933, she relocated to New York City, where she had supporting parts in several Broadway stage productions. In 1934, she was cast in the Ziegfeld Follies revue, the first role where she was credited as Eve Arden. When she was told to adopt a stage name for the show, Arden looked at her cosmetics and "stole my first name from Evening in Paris, and the second from Elizabeth Arden". Between 1934 and 1941, she appeared in Broadway productions of Parade, Very Warm for May, Two for the Show, and Let's Face It!.

Arden's film career began in earnest in 1937 when she signed a contract with RKO Radio Pictures and appeared in the films Oh Doctor and Stage Door. Her Stage Door portrayal of a fast-talking, witty supporting character gained Arden considerable notice and was a template for many of Arden's future roles.

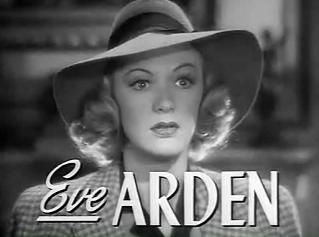
Arden in Comrade X (1940)

In 1938, she played a supporting part in the comedy Having Wonderful Time, starring Ginger Rogers and Douglas Fairbanks, Jr. This was followed by roles in the crime film The Forgotten Woman (1939), and the Marx Brothers comedy At the Circus (1939), a role that required her to perform acrobatics.

In 1940, she appeared in support of Clark Gable and Hedy Lamarr in Comrade X, followed by support in the drama Manpower (1941) opposite Marlene Dietrich, Edward G. Robinson and George Raft. She also had a supporting part in the Red Skelton comedy Whistling in the Dark (1941) and the romantic comedy Obliging Young Lady (1942).

Her many memorable screen roles include a supporting role as Joan Crawford's wise-cracking friend in Mildred Pierce (1945), for which she received an Academy Award nomination as Best Supporting Actress; as a catty cousin turned peacemaker in The Unfaithful (1947); and as James Stewart's wistful but wry secretary in Otto Preminger's mystery Anatomy of a Murder (1959) (which also featured her husband, Brooks West). In 1946, exhibitors voted her the sixth-most promising "star of tomorrow".

Arden became familiar to a new generation of filmgoers when she played Principal McGee in Grease (1978) and Grease 2 (1982). Arden was known for her deadpan comedic delivery.

=== Radio and television ===
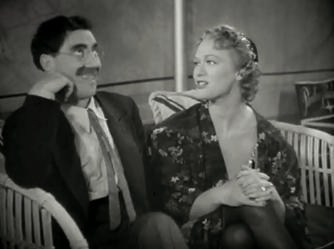
Groucho Marx and Eve Arden in a scene from At the Circus (1939)

Arden's ability with witty scripts made her a natural talent for radio. She was a regular on Danny Kaye's short-lived but memorably zany comedy-variety show in 1946, which also featured swing bandleader Harry James and gravel-voiced character actor-comedian Lionel Stander.

The additional exposure of Arden's comic talent on Kaye's show led to her best-known role, that of Madison High School English teacher Connie Brooks in Our Miss Brooks. Arden portrayed the character on radio from 1948 to 1957, in a television version of the program from 1952 to 1956, and in a 1956 feature film. Her character clashed with the school's principal, Osgood Conklin (played by Gale Gordon) and nursed an unrequited crush on fellow teacher Philip Boynton (played originally by future film star Jeff Chandler; and later on radio and TV by Robert Rockwell). Except for Chandler, the entire radio cast of Arden, Gordon, Richard Crenna (Walter Denton), Robert Rockwell (Mr. Philip Boynton), Gloria McMillan (Harriet Conklin) and Jane Morgan (landlady Margaret Davis) played the same roles on TV.

Arden's portrayal of Miss Brooks was so popular that she was made an honorary member of the National Education Association, received a 1952 award from the Teachers College of Connecticut's Alumni Association "for humanizing the American teacher", and even received teaching job offers. Her well-established wisecracking, deadpan character ultimately became her public persona as a comedienne.

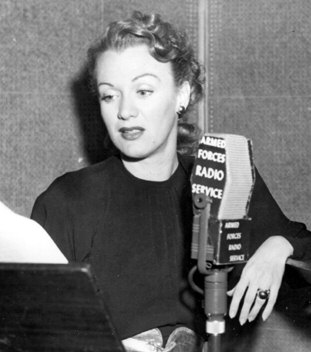
With the Armed Forces Radio Service, 1940s

She won a listeners' poll by Radio Mirror magazine as the top-ranking comedienne of 1948–1949, receiving her award at the end of an Our Miss Brooks broadcast that March. "I'm certainly going to try in the coming months to merit the honor you've bestowed upon me, because I understand that if I win this (award) two years in a row, I get to keep Mr. Boynton," she joked. She was also a hit with the critics: A winter 1949 poll of newspaper and magazine radio editors by Motion Picture Daily named her the year's best radio comedienne.

Arden had a very brief guest appearance in a 1955 I Love Lucy episode titled "L.A. at Last", where she played herself. While awaiting their food at the Brown Derby, Lucy Ricardo (Lucille Ball) and Ethel Mertz (Vivian Vance) argue over whether a certain portrait on a nearby wall is Shelley Winters or Judy Holliday. Lucy urges Ethel to ask a lady occupying the next booth, who turns and replies, "Neither. That's Eve Arden." As Ethel realizes she just spoke to Arden herself, Arden passes Lucy and Ethel's table to leave the restaurant while the pair gawk.

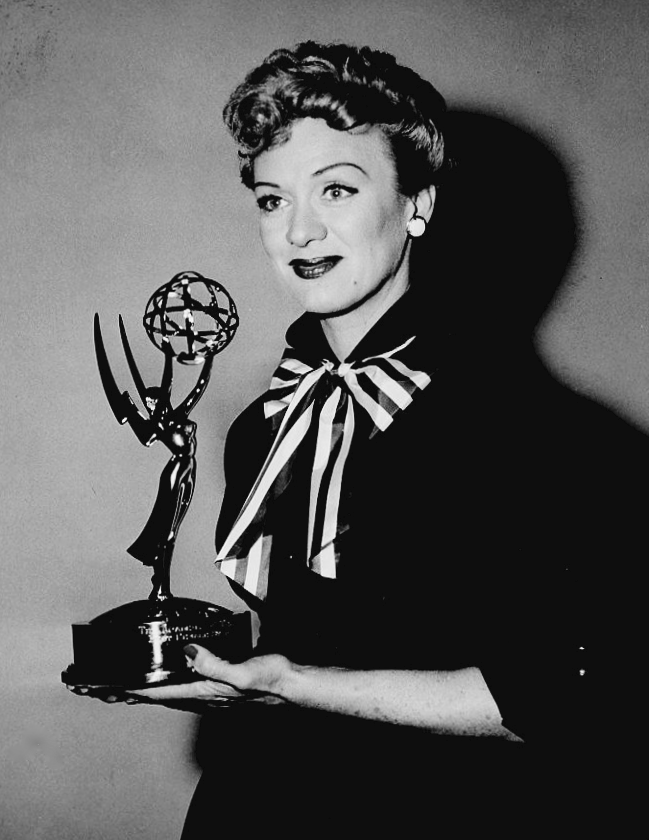
Arden with her Emmy Award for Our Miss Brooks, February 11, 1954

Desilu Productions, jointly owned by Desi Arnaz and Ball during their marriage, was the production company for the Our Miss Brooks television show, filmed during the same years as I Love Lucy. Ball and Arden met when they costarred in the film Stage Door in 1937. Ball, according to numerous radio historians, suggested Arden for Our Miss Brooks after Shirley Booth auditioned for but failed to land the role and Ball—committed at the time to My Favorite Husband—could not.

Arden tried another series for CBS in the fall of 1957, The Eve Arden Show, but it was canceled in spring of 1958 after 26 episodes. In 1966, she played a pediatric nurse in an episode of Bewitched and a scientist in an episode of The Man from U.N.C.L.E.. She later costarred with Kaye Ballard as her neighbor and in-law, Eve Hubbard, in the 1967–1969 NBC situation comedy The Mothers-in-Law, produced by Arnaz after the dissolution of Desilu Productions. In her later career, Arden made appearances on such television shows as Maude, Alice, Hart to Hart, and Falcon Crest. In 1985, she appeared as the wicked stepmother in the Faerie Tale Theatre production of Cinderella.

=== Stage ===
Arden was one of many actresses to take on the title roles in Hello, Dolly! and Auntie Mame in the 1960s; in 1967, she won the Sarah Siddons Award for her work in Chicago theater. In 1983, Arden was cast as the leading lady in what was to be her Broadway comeback, Moose Murders, but she withdrew and was replaced with the much younger Holland Taylor after one preview performance, citing "artistic differences". The show went on to open and close on the same night, becoming known a legendary flop in Broadway history.

== Personal life ==
Arden was married to Edward Grinnell "Ned" Bergen from 1939 to 1947 but reportedly had a long relationship with Danny Kaye throughout the 1940s (likely starting from their Broadway work on Let's Face It! in 1941). Arden was married to actor Brooks West from 1952 until his death in 1984 from a brain hemorrhage at age 67. She adopted her first child with Bergen and a second child as a single mother after her divorce from him. She adopted her third child with West and gave birth to her youngest (with West) at age 46 in 1954. All four children survived their parents.

== Death ==
On November 12, 1990, Arden died at home at age 82. According to her death certificate, she died of cardiac arrest and arteriosclerotic heart disease. Her manager, Glenn Rose, said she also had cancer.

Arden is interred at Westwood Village Memorial Park Cemetery, Westwood, Los Angeles, California.

== Legacy ==
Arden published an autobiography, The Three Phases of Eve, in 1985. In addition to her Academy Award nomination, Arden has two stars on the Hollywood Walk of Fame: Radio and Television (see List of stars on the Hollywood Walk of Fame for addresses). She was inducted into the National Radio Hall of Fame in 1995.

== Filmography ==
=== Film ===
Year	Title	Role	Notes
1929	Song of Love	Maisie LeRoy	
1933	Dancing Lady	Marcia	Uncredited
1937	Oh, Doctor	Shirley Truman	
1937	Stage Door	Eve	
1938	Cocoanut Grove	Sophie De Lemma	
1938	Having Wonderful Time	Henrietta	
1938	Letter of Introduction	Cora Phelps	
1939	Women in the Wind	Kit Campbell	
1939	Big Town Czar	Susan Warren	
1939	The Forgotten Woman	Carrie Ashburn	
1939	Eternally Yours	Gloria	
1939	At the Circus	Peerless Pauline	
1939	A Child Is Born	Miss Pinty	
1939	Slightly Honorable	Miss Ater	
1940	She Couldn't Say No	Alice Hinsdale	
1940	Comrade X	Jane Wilson	
1940	No, No, Nanette	Kitty	
1941	That Uncertain Feeling	Sally Aikens	
1941	Ziegfeld Girl	Patsy Dixon	
1941	She Knew All the Answers	Sally Long	
1941	San Antonio Rose	Gabby Trent	
1941	Whistling in the Dark	'Buzz' Baker	
1941	Manpower	Dolly	
1941	Last of the Duanes	Kate	
1941	Sing for Your Supper	Barbara Stevens	
1941	Bedtime Story	Virginia Cole	
1942	Obliging Young Lady	'Space' O'Shea - AKA Suwanee Rivers	
1943	Hit Parade of 1943	Belinda Wright	Alternative title: Change of Heart
1943	Let's Face It	Maggie Watson	
1944	Cover Girl	Cornelia Jackson	
1944	The Doughgirls	Sgt. Natalia Moskoroff	
1945	Pan-Americana	Helen 'Hoppy' Hopkins	
1945	Earl Carroll Vanities	'Tex' Donnelly	
1945	Patrick the Great	Jean Matthews	
1945	Mildred Pierce	Ida Corwin	
1946	My Reputation	Ginna Abbott	
1946	The Kid from Brooklyn	Ann Westley	
1946	Night and Day	Gabrielle	
1947	The Unfaithful	Paula	
1947	The Arnelo Affair	Vivian Delwyn	
1947	Song of Scheherazade	Madame de Talavera	
1947	The Voice of the Turtle	Olive Lashbrooke	
1948	One Touch of Venus	Molly Stewart	
1948	Whiplash	Chris Sherwood	
1949	My Dream Is Yours	Vivian Martin	
1949	The Lady Takes a Sailor	Susan Wayne	
1950	Paid in Full	Tommy Thompson	
1950	Curtain Call at Cactus Creek	Lily Martin	
1950	Tea for Two	Pauline Hastings	
1950	Three Husbands	Lucille McCabe	
1951	Goodbye, My Fancy	Miss 'Woody' Woods	
1951	Two Tickets to Broadway	Showgirl	
1952	We're Not Married!	Katie Woodruff	
1953	The Lady Wants Mink	Gladys Jones	
1956	Our Miss Brooks	Connie Brooks	
1959	Anatomy of a Murder	Maida Rutledge	
1960	The Dark at the Top of the Stairs	Lottie Lacey	
1965	Sergeant Deadhead	Lt. Charlotte Kinsey	
1975	The Strongest Man in the World	Harriet Crumply	
1978	Grease	Principal McGee	
1981	Under the Rainbow	The Duchess	
1982	Pandemonium	Warden June	
1982	Grease 2	Principal McGee	(final film appearance)

=== Television ===
Year	Title	Role	Notes
1951	Starlight Theatre	Julie Todd	"Julie"
1952–1956	Our Miss Brooks	Connie Brooks	Main role (130 episodes)
1955	I Love Lucy	Herself (cameo)	"Hollywood at Last"
1957–1958	The Eve Arden Show	Liza Hammond	Main role (26 episodes)
1959–1967	The Red Skelton Show	Clara Appleby	Recurring role (6 episodes)
1961	Checkmate	Georgia Golden	"Death by Design"
1962	My Three Sons	Marisa Montaine	"A Holiday for Tramp"
1964	Vacation Playhouse	Claudia Cooper	"He's All Yours"
1965	Laredo	Emma Bristow	"Which Way Did They Go?"
1966	Bewitched	Nurse Kelton	"And Then There Were Three"
1966	Run for Your Life	Mame Huston	"Who's Watching the Fleshpot?"
1966	The Man from U.N.C.L.E.	Prof. Lillian Stemmler	"The Minus-X Affair"
1967	The Danny Thomas Hour	Thelda Cunningham	"The Royal Follies of 1933"
1967–1969	The Mothers-in-Law	Eve Hubbard	Main role (56 episodes)
1969	In Name Only	Aunt Theda Reeson	TV film
1972	A Very Missing Person	Hildegarde Withers	TV film
1972	All My Darling Daughters	Miss Freeling	TV film
1974	The ABC Afternoon Playbreak	Mrs. Owens	"Mother of the Bride"
1974	The Girl with Something Extra	Aunt Fran	"The Greening of Aunt Fran"
1974	Owen Marshall, Counselor at Law	Dr. Lucille Barras	"Subject: The Sterilization of Judy Simpson"
1975	Harry and Maggie	Maggie Sturdivant	TV pilot
1975	Ellery Queen	Vera Bethune / Miss Aggie	"The Adventure of Miss Aggie's Farewell Performance"
1977	Maude	Lola Ashburn	"Maude's Aunt"
1978	A Guide for the Married Woman	Employment lady	TV film
1978	Flying High	Clarissa 'Wedgie' Wedge	"It Was Just One of Those Days"
1979	Vega$	Sarah Bancroft	"Design for Death"
1980	The Dream Merchants	Coralee	TV miniseries
1980	Alice	Martha MacIntire	"Alice in TV Land"
1980	The Love Boat	Ms. Brenda Watts	"The Affair: Parts 1 & 2"
1980	B. J. and the Bear	Mrs. Jarvis	"The Girls of Hollywood High"
1980	Hart to Hart	Sophie Green	"Does She or Doesn't She?"
1981	Nuts and Bolts	Martha Fenton	TV film
1983	Great Performances	Queen of Hearts	"Alice in Wonderland"
1983	Masquerade	Mrs. Woodman	"Diamonds"
1985	Faerie Tale Theatre	The Stepmother	"Cinderella"
1986	Amazing Stories	Jane's Mother	"Secret Cinema"
1987	Falcon Crest	Lillian Nash	"Manhunt" (final TV appearance)

== Select stage credits ==
- Private Lives (1933)
- On Approval (1933)
- Ziegfeld Follies of 1934 (1934)
- Ziegfeld Follies of 1936 (1936)
- Very Warm for May (1939)
- Two for the Show (1940)
- Let's Face It! (1941)
- Over 21 (1950)
- Auntie Mame (1958)
- Goodbye Charlie (1960)
- The Marriage-Go-Round (1961)
- Hello, Dolly! (1966)
- Barefoot in the Park (1967)
- Cactus Flower (1968)
- Butterflies Are Free (1970)
- Applause (1975)
- Absurd Person Singular (1978)
- Little Me (1980)
