= December Bride (disambiguation) =

December Bride is a 1954–1959 American television sitcom.

December Bride may also refer to:

- December Bride (radio program), a 1952–1953 radio sitcom adapted for the TV series
- December Bride (film), a 1990 Irish drama film
- "December Bride" (Roseanne), a 1995 television episode
