= Don Keefer =

American actor (1916–2014)

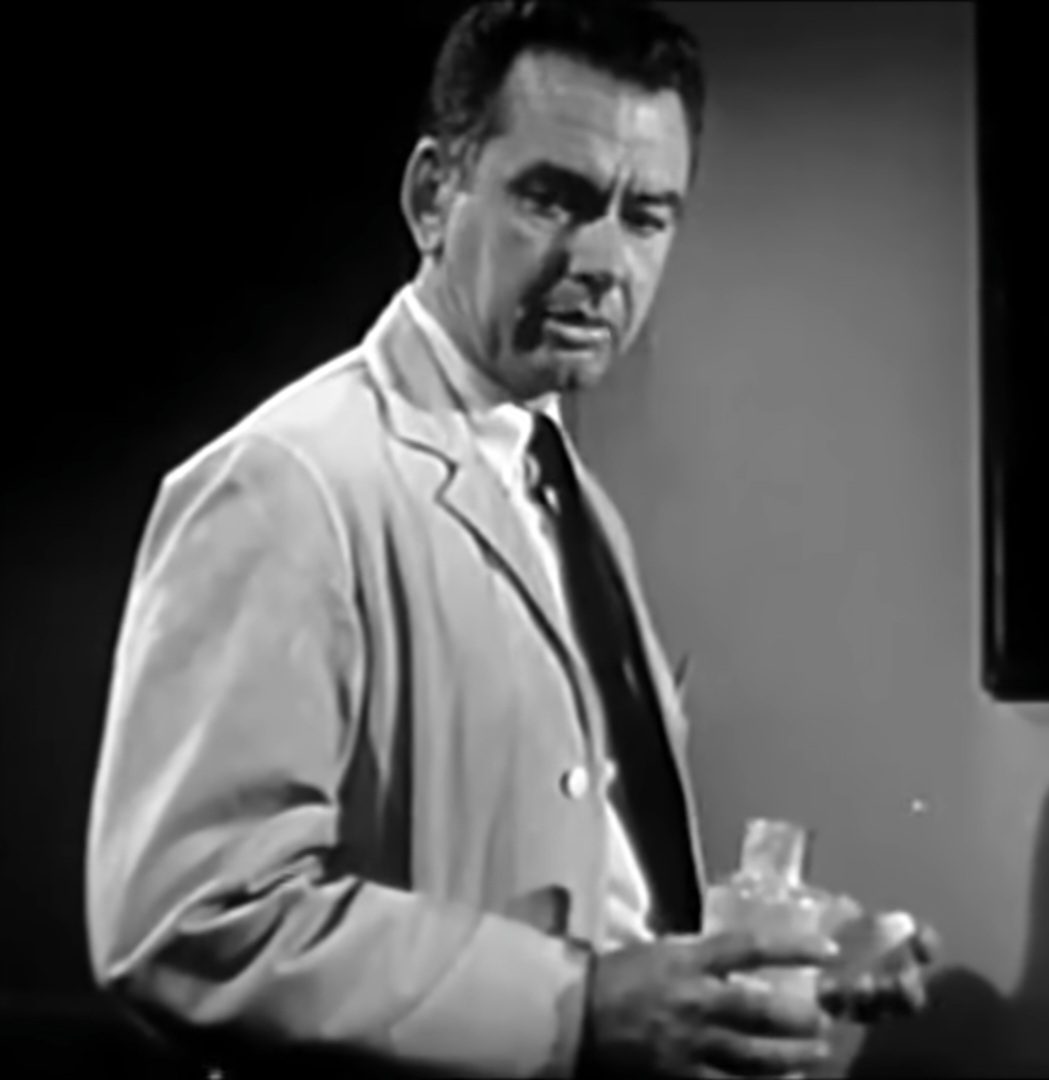
- Keefer in the TV series One Step Beyond, episode Message from Clara, 1959
- Born: Donald Hood Keefer; August 18, 1916; Highspire, Pennsylvania, U.S.
- Died: September 7, 2014 (aged 98); Sherman Oaks, California, U.S.
- Occupation: Actor
- Years active: 1947–1997
- Spouse: Catherine McLeod (m. 1950; died 1997)
- Children: 3

Donald Hood Keefer (August 18, 1916 – September 7, 2014) was an American actor known for his versatility in performing comedic, as well as highly dramatic, roles. In an acting career that spanned more than 50 years, he appeared in hundreds of stage, film, and television productions. He was a founding member of The Actors Studio, and he performed in both the original Broadway play and 1951 film versions of Arthur Miller's Death of a Salesman. His longest-lasting roles on television were in ten episodes each of Gunsmoke and Angel.

== Early life and career ==
Born in Highspire, Pennsylvania in August 1916, Donald Keefer was the youngest of three sons of Edna (née Hood) and John E. Keefer, who worked as a butcher. When he was in his early twenties, "Don" moved to New York City, where he attended the American Academy of Dramatic Arts, graduating from that prestigious acting school in 1939. That same year, at the New York World's Fair, he performed various roles on stage in excerpts of works by William Shakespeare. During the 1940s, Keefer found work as supporting characters in Broadway plays such as Junior Miss and Othello. He also began studying method acting in Manhattan as an early member of The Actors Studio. In this period, he gained some early experience and performed in the new medium of television. In 1947, Keefer appeared in a televised presentation of Shakespeare's play Twelfth Night and in an episode of the anthology series Kraft Television Theatre. The next year, he performed again on Kraft Theatre in an episode titled "The Silver Cord".The Twilight Zone and the original Broadway production of Death of a Salesman, Keefer served in the U.S. Army in Europe during World War II from 1943 to 1946. Before his military service, he had been studying at Pasadena Junior College from 1942 to 1943.

By 1949, Keefer was back on Broadway as a cast member in the acclaimed production of Arthur Miller's play Death of a Salesman, directed by Elia Kazan. Keefer's exposure in that play led to his first movie role, reprising his performance as Bernard in the 1951 film version of Death of a Salesman. He soon appeared in other films, including The Girl in White (1952), The Caine Mutiny (1954), Six Bridges to Cross (1955), Away All Boats (1956), and Hellcats of the Navy (1957). Increasingly, however, Keefer in the 1950s began focusing on performing on the "small screen", accepting more roles in a wide variety of television series.

== Later films and television ==
Keefer appeared in dozens of television series. He also had small roles in some feature films, including Woody Allen's Sleeper (1973). In 1966, he played the character Irving Christiansen in the movie The Russians Are Coming, the Russians Are Coming. He also had a small role in Rod Serling’s Twilight Zone prequel “Time Element” in 1958, starring William Benedix, Darryl Hickman and Martin Balsam. Keefer gave a moving performance as Dan in The Twilight Zone episode "It's a Good Life" (1961), playing a character whose birthday party turns fatal when he opposes six year old Anthony, played by Billy Mumy.

== Personal life and death ==
On May 7, 1950, Keefer married the actress Catherine McLeod, and the couple remained married for 47 years, until her death on May 11, 1997.

In 1957, Don played husband to Catherine on an episode of Gunsmoke titled “Wrong Man” (season 2, episode 29), his character being a homesteader turned cowardly killer and abusive husband whom she finally leaves.

At the time of Catherine's death (following his retirement in acting), the Keefers were living in Sherman Oaks in the San Fernando Valley of Los Angeles County, California. The three Keefer sons are Donald McLeod, John H., and Thomas James. Keefer died at the age of 98 on September 7, 2014.

== Film roles ==
- Death of a Salesman (1951) – Bernard
- The Girl in White (1952) – Dr. Williams
- Riot in Cell Block 11 (1954) – Reporter
- The Caine Mutiny (1954) – Court Stenographer, Yeoman 1st Class (uncredited)
- The Human Jungle (1954) – Detective Cleary
- Six Bridges to Cross (1955) – Sherman
- An Annapolis Story (1955) – Air Officer (uncredited)
- Away All Boats (1956) – Ensign Twitchell
- Hellcats of the Navy (1957) – Jug
- Torpedo Run (1958) – Ensign Ron Milligan
- Cash McCall (1960) – Junior Partner (uncredited)
- The Clown and the Kid (1961) – Moko
- Incident in an Alley (1962) – Roy Swanson
- The Last of the Secret Agents? (1966) – Over-Vain Spy (uncredited)
- The Russians Are Coming, the Russians Are Coming (1966) – Irving Christiansen
- Butch Cassidy and the Sundance Kid (1969) – Fireman
- Gaily, Gaily (1969) – (uncredited)
- R.P.M. (1970) – Dean George Cooper
- Rabbit, Run (1970) – Mr. Springer
- The Grissom Gang (1971) – Doc Grissom
- Walking Tall (1973) – Dr. Lamar Stivers
- The Young Nurses (1973) – Chemist
- Ace Eli and Rodger of the Skies (1973) – Mr. Parsons
- The Way We Were (1973)
- Sleeper (1973) – Doctor Tryon
- Candy Stripe Nurses (1974) – Dr. Wilson
- Billy Jack Goes to Washington (1977) – Bailey Associate
- The Car (1977) – Dr. Pullbrook
- Fire Sale (1977) – Banker
- Mirrors (1978) – Peter
- The Kid from Not-So-Big (1978) – Hank 'Gramps' Goodman
- The Last Word (1979) – Mayor Wenzel
- Creepshow (1982) – Mike the Janitor (segment "The Crate")
- The Marrying Man (1991) – Justice #3
- Lucy & Desi: Before the Laughter (CBS, 1991) (TV movie) – Grandpa Ball
- Liar Liar (1997) – Beggar at Courthouse (final film role)

== Western roles ==
Keefer's Gunsmoke appearances included three half-hour episodes and seven full one-hour broadcasts that aired from 1957-1973:

- "Wrong Man" (13 April 1957) (Season 2 Episode 29) - as the character Sam Rickers
- "Bad Sheriff" (7 January 1961) (Season 6 Episode 17) - Chet
- "Coventry" (17 March 1962) (Season 7 Episode 24) - Rankin
- "Quint-Cident" (27 April 1963) (Season 8 Episode 33) - Nally
- "The Pariah" (17 April 1965) (Season 10 Episode 30) - Newspaper editor
- "Taps for Old Jeb" (16 October 1965) (Season 11 Episode 5) - Milty Sims
- "Champion of the World" (24 December 1966) (Season 12 Episode 14) - Wally
- "Gentry's Law" (12 October 1970) (Season 16 Episode 5) - Floyd Babcock
- "Waste: Part 1" (27 September 1971) (Season 17 Episode 3) - Drunk
- "Kitty's Love Affair" (22 October 1973) (Season 19 Episode 6) - Turner

Keefer appeared in more than a dozen other western series:

- Have Gun - Will Travel (CBS, 1957–1960) (3 episodes)
  - (Season 1 Episode 4: "Winchester Quarantine") (1957) as Kelso
  - (Season 2 Episode 13: "The Solid Gold Patrol") (1958) as Colonel Barlowe
  - (Season 4 Episode 7: "The Tender Gun") (1960) as Corcoran, Gun Drummer
- Wagon Train (NBC, 1960) (Season 3 Episode 21: "The Tom Tuckett Story") as Major Anderson
- Hotel de Paree (CBS, 1960) (Season 1 Episode 30: "Sundance and the Barren Soil") as Red Porterfield
- Rawhide (CBS, 1960) (Season 2 Episode 13: "Incident of the Druid Curse") as Hames
- Whispering Smith (NBC, 1961) (Season 1 Episode 7: "The Deadliest Weapon") as Dr. Johnson
- The Dakotas (ABC, 1963) (Season 1 Episode 17: "Feud at Snake River") as Minister
- Death Valley Days (Syndicated, 1966-1968) (3 episodes)
  - (Season 15 Episode 8: "Samaritans- Mountain Style") (1966) as Gilpin, Newspaperman
  - (Season 15 Episode 11: "The Hero of Apache Pass") (1966) as Colonel, the Commandant
  - (Season 17 Episode 8: "Lady with a Past") (1968) as Mr. Adams
- The Virginian (NBC, 1966–1969) (3 episodes)
  - (Season 4 Episode 25: "The Return of Golden Tom") (1966) as Ross Tedler
  - (Season 6 Episode 12: "The Barren Ground") (1967) as Station Master
  - (Season 7 Episode 16: "Last Grave at Socorro Creek") (1969) as Undertaker
- Dundee and the Culhane (CBS, 1967) (Season 1 Episode 5: "The Dead Man's Brief") as Johnson
- Walt Disney's Wonderful World of Color (NBC, 1967) (2 episodes of the Gallegher miniseries) (Roger Mobley played the part of Gallegher)
  - (Season 13 Episode 18: "Gallegher Goes West: Tragedy on the Trail") as John Prentice
  - (Season 13 Episode 19: "Gallegher Goes West: Trial by Terror") as John Prentice
- The Iron Horse (ABC, 1967) (Season 1 Episode 30: "Sister Death") as Blake
- The Outcasts (ABC, 1968) (Season 1 Episode 10: "The Man from Bennington") as Case
- Cimarron Strip (CBS, 1968) (Season 1 Episode 15: "The Judgment") as Bolt
- The Guns of Will Sonnett (ABC, 1968–1969) (2 episodes)
  - (Season 1 Episode 19: "End of the Rope") (1968) as Prosecutor
  - (Season 2 Episode 21: "One Angry Juror") (1969) as Sawyer
- Bonanza (NBC, 1969-1971) (2 episodes)
  - (Season 10 Episode 26: "The Running Man") (1969) as Billy Harris
  - (Season 13 Episode 11: "The Rattlesnake Brigade") (1971) as Tobias Temple
- The High Chaparral (NBC, 1970) (Season 4 Episode 2: "Spokes") as Telegrapher
- Alias Smith and Jones (ABC, 1971) (Season 1 Episode 10: "The Man Who Murdered Himself") as Dr. Hiram Wilson
- Nichols (NBC, 1971) (Season 1 Episode 7: "The Specialists") as Burt Lincoln
- Kung Fu (ABC, 1974-1975) (2 episodes)
  - (Season 3 Episode 7: "Cry of the Night Beast") (1974) as Stripper
  - (Season 3 Episode 19: "Flight to Orion") (1975) as Station Keeper

== Angel and other comedies ==
On Angel, Keefer portrayed the neighbor George, husband of Susie, a character played by Doris Singleton, a veteran of the original I Love Lucy series. Marshall Thompson played Johnny Smith, a young architect and the husband of Annie Fargé's Angel Smith character. Keefer's Angel roles include 26 credited episodes:

- "Voting Can Be Fun" (13 October 1960) (Season 1 Episode 2)
- "Angel's Temper" (10 November 1960) (Season 1 Episode 5)
- "The Valedictorian" (15 December 1960) (Season 1 Episode 10)
- "The Dowry" (19 January 1961) (Season 1 Episode 14)
- "The Joint Bank Account" (2 February 1961) (Season 1 Episode 16)
- "Call Me Mother" (9 February 1961) (Season 1 Episode 17)
- "Phone Fun" (22 March 1961) (Season 1 Episode 22)
- "Unpopular Mechanics" (19 April 1961) (Season 1 Episode 26)
- "The Trailer" (10 May 1961) (Season 1 Episode 29)
- "Goodbye, Young Lovers" (17 May 1961) (Season 1 Episode 30)

The following are a selection of other sitcoms in which Keefer performed:

- Window on Main Street (CBS, 1962) (Season 1 Episode 18: "Girl with the Rose Colored Eyes")
- Car 54, Where Are You? (1962) (Season 2 Episode 7: "Remember St. Petersburg") as Dr. R.L. Mitchell, psychiatrist
- The Real McCoys (CBS, 1963) (Season 6 Episode 36: "The Peacemakers") as Harry Porter
- My Favorite Martian (CBS, 1964) (2 episodes)
  - (Season 1 Episode 29: "Unidentified Flying Uncle Martin") as Jim
  - (Season 2 Episode 4: "Nothing But the Truth") as Henry
- The Munsters (CBS, 1965) (Season 2 Episode 7: "Operation Herman") as Dr. Elliott
- The Jack Benny Program (NBC, 1965) (Season 15 Episode 17: "The Kingston Trio, Guests") as Social Worker
- The Farmer's Daughter (ABC, 1965-1966) (3 episodes)
  - (Season 2 Episode 31: "Never Listen to Rumors") (1965) as Rod Walden
  - (Season 3 Episode 3: "Stag at Bay") (1965) as Dr. Roscoe
  - (Season 3 Episode 23: "Alias Katy Morley") (1966) as Police Lieutenant
- Petticoat Junction (CBS, 1966) (Season 3 Episode 24: "It's Not the Principle, It's the Money") as Mr. Forbes
- Bewitched (ABC, 1966) (Season 3 Episode 8: "Dangerous Diaper Dan") as A.J. Kimberley
- That Girl (ABC, 1966) (Season 1 Episode 16: "Christmas and the Hard-Luck Kid") as Mr. Carson
- Love on a Rooftop (ABC, 1967) (Season 1 Episode 20: "My Father, the TV Star") as Palmer
- The Andy Griffith Show (CBS, 1967-1968) (2 episodes)
  - (Season 8 Episode 15: "Howard's New Life") (1967) as Grover
  - (Season 8 Episode 17: "The Mayberry Chef") (1968) as Carl Phillips
- The Good Guys (CBS, 1969) (Season 1 Episode 12: "Ouzo Annie") as Burns
- Green Acres (CBS, 1970) (Season 5 Episode 18: "The Ex-Con") as Carl Kelcy
- Alice (CBS, 1984) (Season 9 Episode 2: "Space Sharples") as Wally

== Dramatic episodes ==
Keefer appeared as Cromwell in the 1968 episode "Assignment: Earth" of the NBC science fiction series Star Trek. Earlier, he had roles in the following three episodes of CBS's The Twilight Zone: as Dan Hollis in "It's a Good Life" (1961), as Spiereto in "Passage on the Lady Anne" (1963), and as Fred Danziger in "From Agnes - With Love" (1964).

His other drama roles include:

- Appointment with Adventure (CBS, 1955) (Season 1 Episode 20: "The Royal Treatment")
- Richard Diamond, Private Detective (1957) (Season 1 Episode 7: "The Big Score") as Reagan
- Alfred Hitchcock Presents (1957-1961) (3 episodes)
  - (Season 2 Episode 37: "The Indestructible Mr. Weems") (1957) as (Lodge) Brother Dr. Elkins
  - (Season 3 Episode 14: "The Percentage") (1958) as Pete Williams
  - (Season 6 Episode 21: "The Kiss-Off") (1961) as Tax Clerk
- Going My Way (ABC, 1963) (Season 1 Episode 20: "One Small Unhappy Family") as Mr. Ewbank
- The Fugitive (ABC, 1964) (Season 1 Episode 18: "Where the Action Is") as Ben Haddock
- Slattery's People (CBS, 1965) (Season 1 Episode 15: "Question: What Did You Do All Day, Mr. Slattery?") as George Farnum
- Mission: Impossible (CBS, 1967) (Season 1 Episode 18: "The Trial") as Zubin
- Felony Squad (ABC, 1967) (Season 2 Episode 3: "A Most Proper Killing") as Harry Jocelyn
- The F.B.I. (ABC, 1966–1973) (5 episodes)
  - (Season 2 Episode 4: "The Cave-In") (1966) as Junkman
  - (Season 4 Episode 24: "The Young Warriors") (1969) as Dr. J.F. Bissell
  - (Season 5 Episode 14: "Journey Into Night") (1969) as Mr. Allison
  - (Season 6 Episode 26: "Three-Way Split") (1971) as Claude Norris
  - (Season 8 Episode 21: "The Wedding Gift") (1973) as Dr. Darcy
- Marcus Welby, M.D. (1972-1974) (2 episodes)
  - (Season 3 Episode 22: "Don't Talk About Darkness") (1972) as Dr. Marvin Hendrix
  - (Season 5 Episode 20: "The Mugging") (ABC, 1974) as Larry Sabberly
- Chase (NBC, 1974) (Season 1 Episode 17: "Vacation for a President")
- S.W.A.T. (ABC, 1975) (Season 2 Episode 13: "Terror Ship") as Captain Wallen
- The Streets of San Francisco (ABC, 1976) (Season 4 Episode 20: "Clown of Death") as Dr. Mayhill
- The Waltons (CBS, 1977) (Season 5 Episode 24: "The Go-Getter") as Arnie Shimerdy
- Barnaby Jones (1974-1979) (4 episodes)
  - (Season 2 Episode 17: Programmed for Killing") (1974) as Mr. Greening
  - (Season 4 Episode 18: "Silent Vendetta") (1976) as Dave Blevins
  - (Season 5 Episode 20: "The Killer on Campus") (1977) as Professor Albertson
  - (Season 7 Episode 24: "Target for a Wedding") (CBS, 1979) as Tully Kupper
- Quincy, M.E. (NBC, 1979–1982) (3 episodes)
  - (Season 4 Episode 10: "A Question of Death") (1979) as Terence Morgan
  - (Season 5 Episode 20: "The Final Gift") (1980) as Doc Watson
  - (Season 7 Episode 11: "When Luck Ran Out") (1982) as Dr. Lloyd Matson
- All My Children (ABC, 1984) (Episode 3819) as Horace Willoughby
- Highway to Heaven (NBC, 1986) (Season 3 Episode 3: "For the Love of Larry") as Dr. Washburn
- Picket Fences (1992-1995) (2 episodes)
  - (Season 1 Episode 10: "The Snake Lady") (1992) as Billy Shauger
  - (Season 4 Episode 6: "Heart of Saturday Night") (CBS, 1995)
- Lois & Clark: The New Adventures of Superman (ABC, 1996) (Season 4 Episode 5: "Brutal Youth") as Old Benny Rockland

Keefer's final role was as a beggar at a courthouse in the 1997 film Liar Liar.
