= Jess Oppenheimer =

American radio and television writer, producer, and director

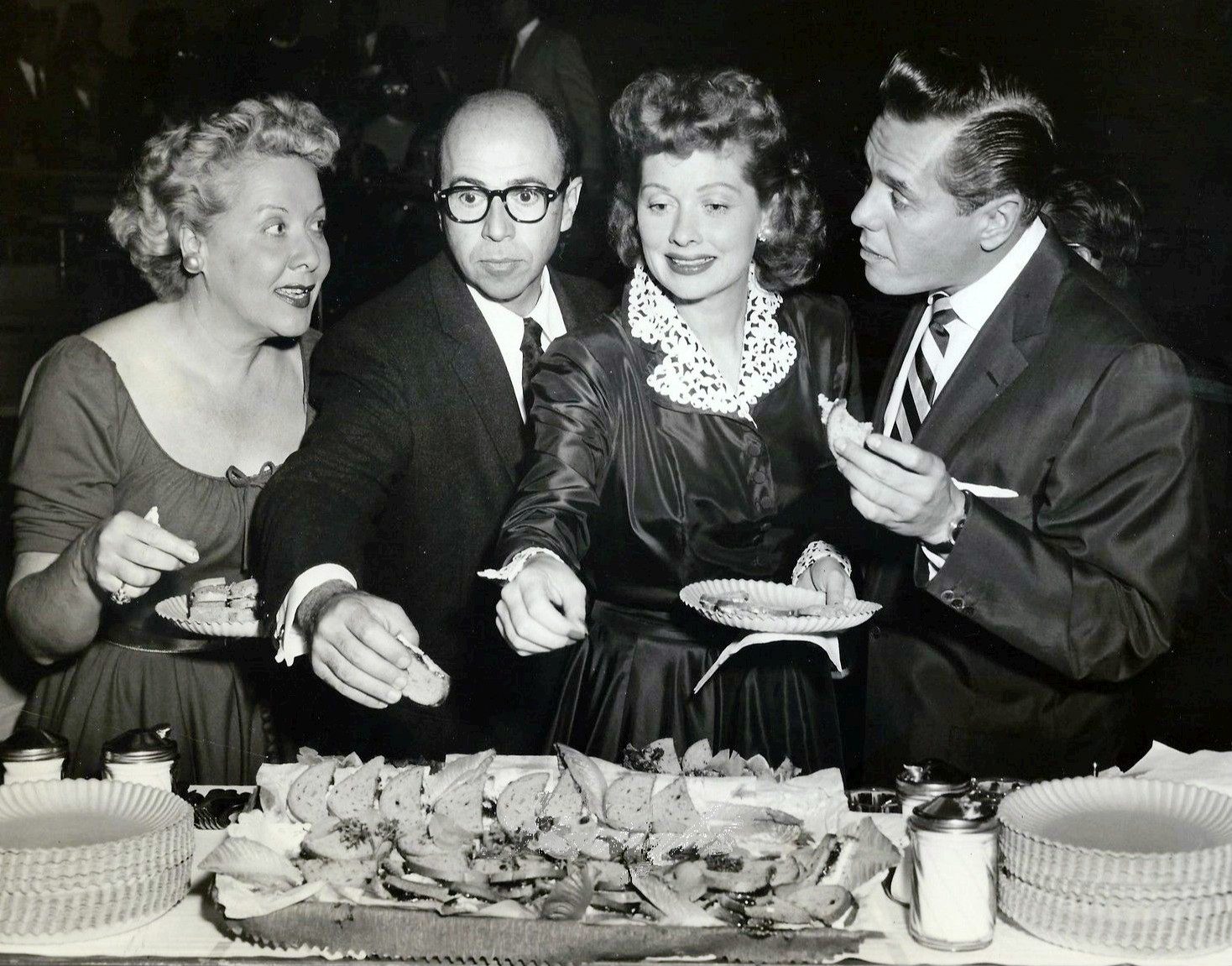
- Oppenheimer (second from left) with Vivian Vance, Lucille Ball, and Desi Arnaz in 1955
- Born: Jessurun James Oppenheimer; November 11, 1913; San Francisco, California, U.S.
- Died: December 27, 1988 (aged 75); Los Angeles, California, U.S.
- Education: Stanford University
- Occupations: Radio writer; television writer; producer; director; creator-producer-head writer of I Love Lucy
- Years active: 1934–1987
- Spouse: Estelle Weiss Oppenheimer (m. 1947)
- Children: 2

Jessurun James Oppenheimer (November 11, 1913 – December 27, 1988) was an American radio and television writer, producer, and director. He was the producer and head writer of the CBS sitcom I Love Lucy.

Lucille Ball called Oppenheimer “the brains” behind I Love Lucy. As series creator, producer, and head writer, “Jess was the creative force behind the ‘Lucy’ show,” according to I Love Lucy director William Asher. “He was the field general. Jess presided over all the meetings, and ran the whole show. He was very sharp.”

== Early life and education ==
He was born into a secular Jewish family in San Francisco, where in the third grade he was chosen as a subject of Stanford University professor Lewis Terman's study of gifted children. Prof. Terman's assistant noted in Oppenheimer's file, "I could detect no signs of a sense of humor."

During his junior year at Stanford during the 1930s, Oppenheimer visited the studios of radio station KFRC in San Francisco, and soon started spending all his spare time there. He made his broadcast debut performing a comedy sketch he'd written on the station's popular coast-to-coast comedy-variety radio program, Blue Monday Jamboree.

== Career ==
In 1936, Oppenheimer moved to Hollywood, where in his first week he was hired as a comedy writer on Fred Astaire's radio program. When Astaire's show ended the following year, Oppenheimer landed a job as a radio gag writer for Jack Benny. He later wrote comedy for such other variety programs as The Chase and Sanborn Hour with Edgar Bergen and Charlie McCarthy," "The Lifebuoy Program starring Al Jolson," "The Gulf Screen Guild Show," and "The Rudy Vallee Program." As a staff writer on those programs, Oppenheimer wrote sketch comedy for many Hollywood stars, including Fanny Brice, George Burns and Gracie Allen, Bing Crosby, Marlene Dietrich, Judy Garland, Bob Hope, and Ginger Rogers.

With the start of World War II, Oppenheimer joined the United States Coast Guard and was posted to the Public Relations Department. The sailor at the next desk was a young agent named Ray Stark, the son-in-law of Fanny Brice. Stark immediately hired Oppenheimer to write for the popular radio program, The Baby Snooks Show, which starred Brice as a wise-beyond-her-years little girl who constantly drove her daddy crazy.

In 1948, shortly after The Baby Snooks Show went off the air, CBS asked Oppenheimer to write a script for a new unsponsored radio sitcom, My Favorite Husband, starring Lucille Ball. In the handful of episodes that had already aired, Ball had played "Liz Cugat," a "gay, sophisticated," socialite wife of a bank vice president.

Oppenheimer decided to make her radio character more like Baby Snooks: less sophisticated, more childlike, scheming, and impulsive—taking Lucy and the show in a new direction, with broad, slapstick comedy. The show was a huge success. CBS quickly signed Oppenheimer as the show's head writer, producer, and director. Oppenheimer was hesitant to accept the position after being warned by his friends against working with Ball, but he decided to accept anyway after seeing her brilliant performance of his script. Soon the series gained both a sponsor and a much larger audience. My Favorite Husband also marked the beginning of Oppenheimer's successful collaboration with future I Love Lucy writers Madelyn Pugh and Bob Carroll, Jr.

In December 1950, when CBS agreed to produce a TV pilot starring Lucille Ball and her husband, Desi Arnaz, Lucy insisted on Oppenheimer to head up the project. But with a completed pilot due in just a few weeks, nobody knew what the series should be about. "Why don't we do a show," Oppenheimer suggested, "about a middle-class working stiff who works very hard at his job as a bandleader, and likes nothing better than to come home at night and relax with his wife, who doesn't like staying home and is dying to get into show business herself?" He decided to call the show I Love Lucy.

He remained as producer and head writer of the series for five of its six seasons, writing the pilot and 153 episodes with Madelyn Pugh and Bob Carroll Jr. (joined in the fall of 1955 by writers Bob Schiller and Bob Weiskopf). Oppenheimer appeared on the show in Episode #6 ("The Audition"), as one of the three unimpressed TV executives for whom Ricky performs at the Tropicana.

Oppenheimer left I Love Lucy in 1956 to take an executive post at NBC, where he produced a series of TV specials, including the General Motors 50th Anniversary Show (1957), Ford Startime (1959), The Ten Commandments (1959), and the 1959 Emmy Awards. Oppenheimer and Ball were reunited in 1962 when he produced The Danny Kaye Show with Lucille Ball, which was nominated as 'Program of the Year' by the TV Academy, and again in 1964, when he executive produced The Lucille Ball Comedy Hour with Bob Hope. In 1959, Oppenheimer signed a deal with CBS Films to produce television properties.

In the 1960s Oppenheimer created and produced three short-lived sitcoms: Angel (1960–61), starring Annie Fargé and Marshall Thompson, Glynis (1963–64), starring Glynis Johns, and The Debbie Reynolds Show (1969–70). His other TV credits included writing The United States Steel Hour, producing Bob Hope Presents the Chrysler Theatre, and writing, producing, and directing a portion of the 1967–68 season of Get Smart, starring Don Adams. Oppenheimer received two Emmy Awards and seven other Emmy nominations, a Sylvania Award, and the Writers' Guild of America's Paddy Chayefsky Laurel Award for Screenwriting Achievement.

=== Lawsuit ===
Oppenheimer was not involved with The Lucy Show, Ball's 1962 return to television. He claimed that in that show her new character, Lucy Carmichael, was essentially the Lucy Ricardo character he had created. He received a financial settlement and storylines were changed, but this ended his relationship with Ball.

== Personal life ==
Oppenheimer met his future wife, Estelle Weiss, in 1942 while she was working as the manager of the Popular Records Department at Wallichs Music City, on the corner of Sunset and Vine in Hollywood. After a long courtship, the two married on August 5, 1947. Thirteen months later their daughter, Joanne, was born. Their son, Gregg, was born March 8, 1951.

Oppenheimer was also an inventor, holding 18 patents covering a variety of devices, including the in-the-lens teleprompter, first used on television by Lucille Ball and Desi Arnaz for a filmed Philip Morris cigarette commercial which aired on I Love Lucy on December 14, 1953.

== Death and legacy ==
Oppenheimer died of heart failure on December 27, 1988, following complications after being hospitalized at Cedars-Sinai Medical Center in Los Angeles for intestinal surgery. He was survived by his wife, Estelle, his son, Gregg, and his daughter, Jo Oppenheimer Davis. His wife, Estelle, died on December 23, 2007, at the age of 85; she was survived by their children, two grandchildren, and three great-grandchildren. Upon his death, Lucille Ball called Jess Oppenheimer "a true genius," adding, "I owe so much to his creativity and his friendship." His memoir, Laughs, Luck...and Lucy: How I Came to Create the Most Popular Sitcom of All Time, was completed after his death by his son, Gregg Oppenheimer. That memoir inspired the younger Oppenheimer to write the play I Love Lucy: A Funny Thing Happened on the Way to the Sitcom, which had its world premiere in Los Angeles on July 12, 2018, starring Seamus Dever as Oppenheimer, Sarah Drew as Lucille Ball, and Oscar Nuñez as Desi Arnaz. The play was recorded in front of a live audience for nationwide public radio broadcast and online distribution. BBC Radio 4 broadcast a serialized version of the play in the UK in August 2020, as LUCY LOVES DESI: A Funny Thing Happened on the Way to the Sitcom, starring Jared Harris as Oppenheimer, Anne Heche as Lucille Ball, Wilmer Valderrama as Desi Arnaz, Stacy Keach as William Frawley, and Alfred Molina as CBS Executive Harry Ackerman. In January 2023, L.A. Theatre Works mounted a 22-city U.S. national tour of the play as LUCY LOVES DESI: A Funny Thing Happened on the Way to the Sitcom. In November 2023, Next Stage Press published the play's script, making performance licenses available to schools, community theatre groups, and local theatre companies.

In the 1991 television movie Lucy & Desi: Before the Laughter, Oppenheimer is portrayed by Howard Schechter. In the 2018 film The Maestro, Oppenheimer is portrayed by David J. Phillips. In the 2021 Aaron Sorkin film Being the Ricardos, Oppenheimer is portrayed by Tony Hale, and as an older man by John Rubinstein.

Oppenheimer is memorialized in the Lucille Ball Desi Arnaz Museum & Center for Comedy in Jamestown, New York.
