= Richard Diamond, Private Detective =

American radio and TV detective series

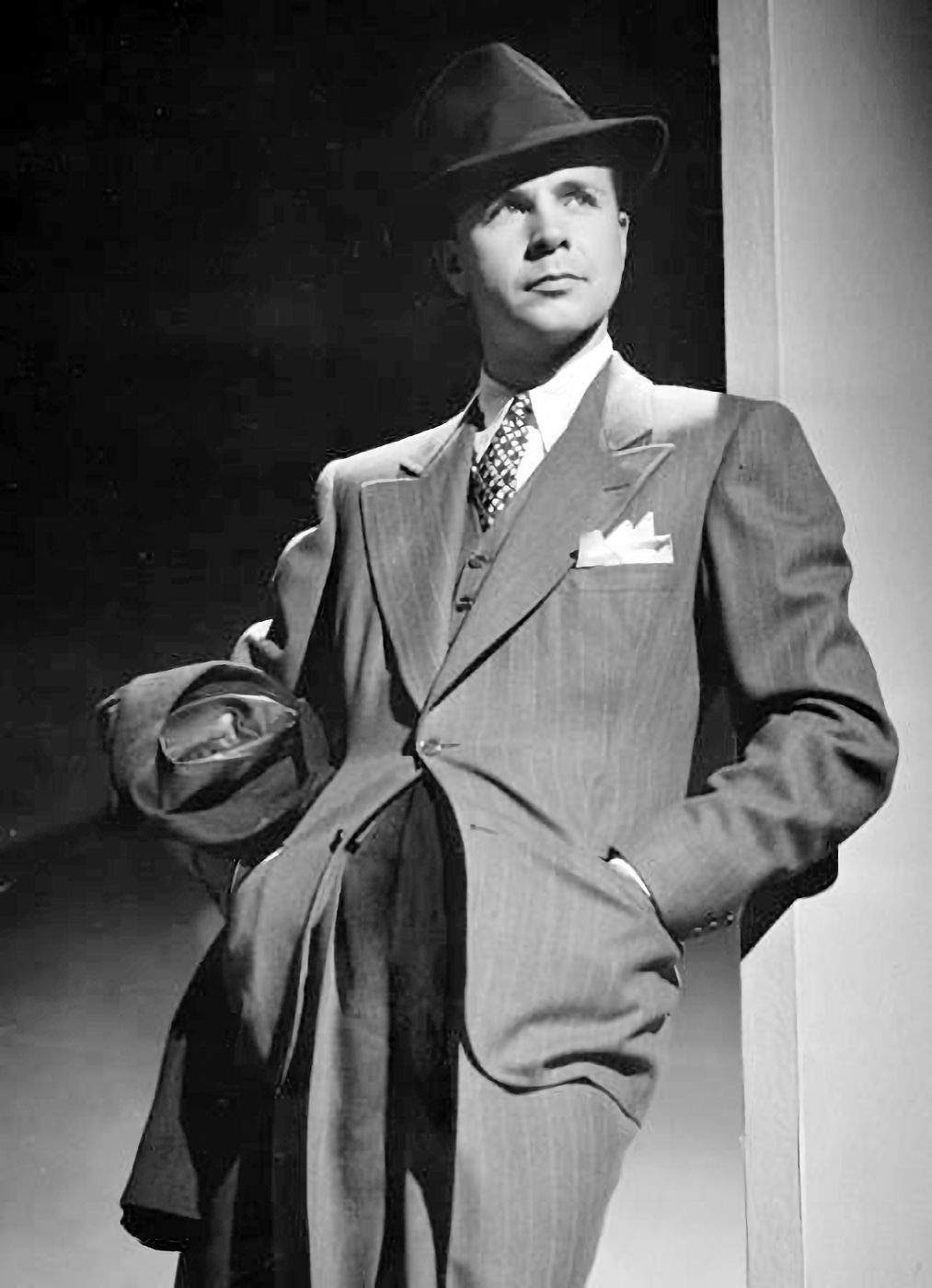
- Dick Powell costumed as Richard Diamond, Private Detective in a publicity photo
- Running time: 30 minutes
- Country of origin: United States
- Language: English
- Home station: NBC; ABC; CBS
- Starring: Dick Powell
- Written by: Blake Edwards; Harvey Easton
- Directed by: William P. Rousseau; Blake Edwards; Jaime del Valle
- Original release: April 24, 1949 – September 20, 1953
- Opening theme: "Leave It to Love"

Richard Diamond, Private Detective
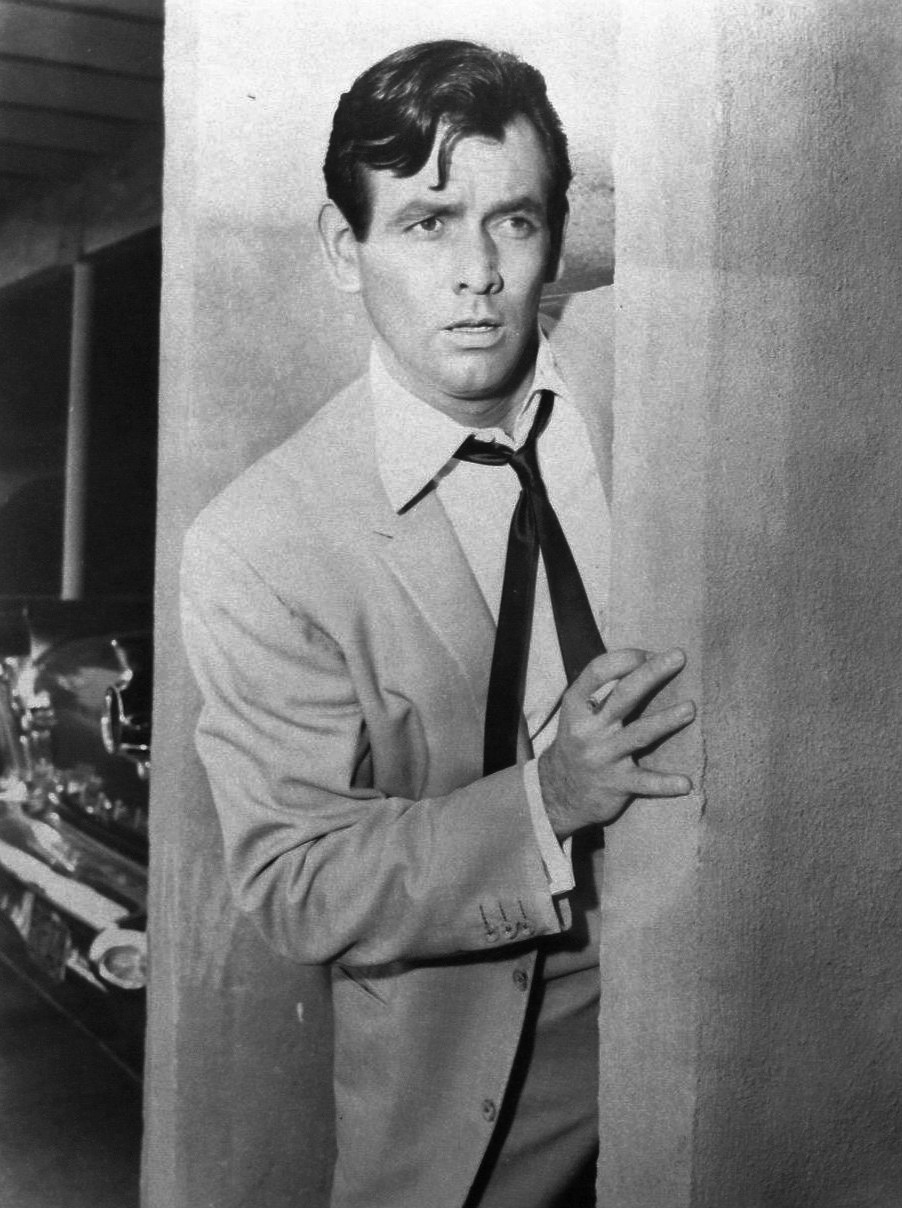
- David Janssen as Richard Diamond (1959)
- Also known as: Call Mr. D
- Genre: Crime drama
- Written by: Blake Edwards
- Directed by: Thomas Carr; Don McDougall; Tom Gries et al
- Starring: David Janssen; Regis Toomey; Barbara Bain; Russ Conway
- Composers: Frank DeVol (seasons 1 & 2); Pete Rugolo (season 3); Richard Shores (season 4)
- Country of origin: United States
- Original language: English
- No. of seasons: 4
- No. of episodes: 77 (list of episodes)

Production
- Producers: Mark Sandrich Jr.; David Heilweil; Vincent M. Fennelly; Richard Carr
- Production locations: New York City; Los Angeles
- Cinematography: George E. Diskant
- Editors: Arthur Hilton; Chandler House et al
- Camera setup: Single-camera
- Running time: 24–25 minutes per episode
- Production company: Four Star Television

Original release
- Network: CBS Television (1957–59); NBC (1959–60)
- Release: July 1, 1957 – September 6, 1960

Richard Diamond, Private Detective is an American detective drama, created by Blake Edwards, which aired on radio from 1949 to 1953, and on television from 1957 to 1960.

== Radio ==
Dick Powell starred in the Richard Diamond, Private Detective radio series as a wisecracking former police officer turned private detective. Episodes typically open with a client visiting or calling cash-strapped Diamond's office and agreeing to his fee of $100 a day plus expenses, or Diamond taking on a case at the behest of his friend and former partner, Lt. Walter Levinson. Diamond often suffers a blow to the head in his sleuthing pursuits. Most episodes end with Diamond at the piano, singing a standard, popular song, or showtune from Powell's repertoire to Helen Asher (his girlfriend) in her penthouse at 975 Park Avenue.

Levinson was played variously by Ed Begley, Arthur Q. Bryan, Ted DeCorsia and Alan Reed. Helen was played by Virginia Gregg and others. Another regular cast member was Wilms Herbert as Walt's bumbling sergeant, Otis, who also "doubled" on the show as Helen's butler, Francis.

Many of the shows were either written or directed by Edwards. Its theme, "Leave It to Love", was whistled by Powell at the beginning of each episode.

It began airing on NBC Radio on April 24, 1949, picked up Rexall as a sponsor on April 5, 1950, and continued until December 6, 1950. With Camel cigarettes as a sponsor, it moved to ABC from January 5, 1951, to June 29, 1951, with Rexall returning for a run from October 5, 1951, until June 27, 1952. Substituting for Amos 'n' Andy, it aired Sunday evenings on CBS (again, for Rexall) from May 31, 1953 until September 20, 1953.

== Television series ==
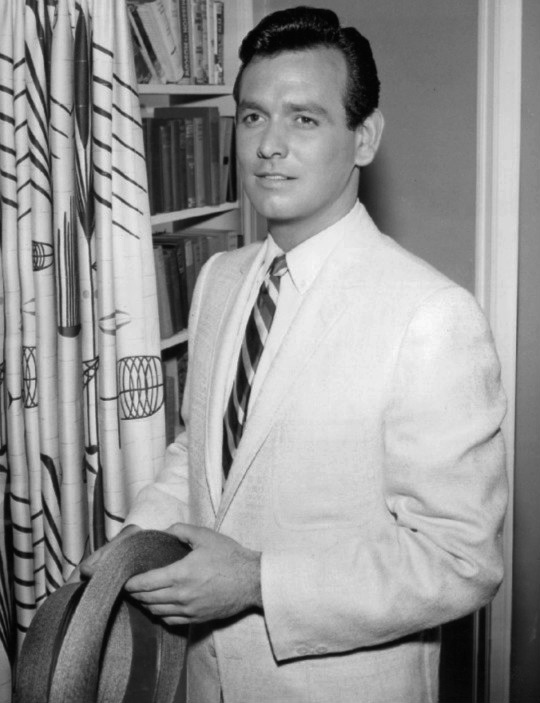
David Janssen (1957)

General Foods bought the program from Powell as a summer replacement for December Bride in 1957.

The television debut of Richard Diamond occurred on November 22, 1956, when Don Taylor portrayed the character in the "Double Cross" episode on Chevron Hall of Stars.

Powell's company, Four Star Television, produced the television version of Richard Diamond, Private Detective, which premiered in the summer of 1957 on CBS. It returned to CBS in January 1958 for the second season and in February 1959 for the third season, again on CBS. In the fall of 1959, the fourth and final season aired on NBC.

David Janssen, before The Fugitive, starred as Diamond, a former officer of the New York Police Department and a hard-boiled private detective in the film noir tradition. Don Taylor played the title role in a 1956 television pilot, broadcast as an episode of the anthology series Chevron Hall of Stars. The first two television seasons followed radio's characterization the most closely (several episodes were adapted from the radio series). Diamond, known for his charm and wisecracks as much as his virility, was still based in New York, though Janssen never sat at a piano and sang, as Powell had typically ended most of the radio episodes. In the noirish opening sequence, clad in hat, suit, and tie, he walks down a dimly lit street toward the camera and lights up a cigarette, the light revealing his face. After the first season when the sponsor was Maxwell House, the show was sponsored by Kent cigarettes, and Frank DeVol’s playfully mysterious theme was heard underneath an announcer hawking either "Maxwell House – Good to the Last Drop" or “Kent with the Micronite filter.” In syndicated rebroadcasts of the series, the revised title, Call Mr. D., flashes on the screen, and DeVol's music is replaced by Pete Rugolo’s far more recognizable theme—although that did not appear until Season 3.

Following the second season, the setting was switched from New York City to Los Angeles, and the production was entirely redesigned. The 18 episodes comprising Season 3 aired from February to mid-June of 1959, and Diamond’s character now bore only slight resemblance to his California-based noirish predecessors Sam Spade and Philip Marlowe. By the late 1950s, the glamour of Hollywood was becoming an irresistible fantasy for millions of viewers, and the popularity of Warner Brothers’ 77 Sunset Strip—which involved a good deal of location shooting and began airing four months before Diamond's third season—undoubtedly influenced a newer P. I. image that often seemed more inspired by Hugh Hefner than by Dashiell Hammett. Diamond no longer occupied a low-rent, cloistered office, but now operated from a modern, beautifully appointed ranch house—complete with a swimming pool—in the Hollywood Hills. With panoramic sliding glass doors providing views of the mountains and the city, his sunken living room featured a bar and a loveseat, where he could be found many evenings entertaining young women before a fire. Following the lead of the Sunset Strip private eyes, he also drove a convertible—in this case a 1959 DeSoto Fireflite. The Hefner-like fantasy was enhanced by gadgets, especially Diamond's car phone, which connected him directly to an answering service overseen by the shapely, enigmatic “Sam”. Season 3's modern, more youthful ambience was complemented by a jazz score by composer/arranger Pete Rugolo, who created a set of big-band, Stan Kenton-esque cues for each of the episodes. In the highly stylized opening sequence, Rugolo's robust theme is preceded by tense melodic fragments underscoring a series of frenetic, silhouette images of Diamond running, before walking forward—again in hat, suit, and tie—to light a cigarette, suggesting a re-boot of the original noirish conception. (Rugolo's score soon became so popular that in 1959 a full album of his Diamond cues, The Music from Richard Diamond, was released on the Mercury label.)

In the fourth season, which aired on NBC, the writers retained Los Angeles as the setting, but the Hefner-esque fantasy elements were considerably toned down. Now Diamond again operated from an office reminiscent of what he had known in New York, and his beautiful ranch house was replaced by an attractive—though more conventional—apartment. His car phone still connected him to Sam, but he now drove a 1959 Ford Galaxie convertible—absent the impressive tail fins of his DeSoto. Though the opening titles remained, Rugolo's score was replaced by a more sedate theme, "Nervous" by Richard Shores, later to be used during the highlight sequence that began every episode of The Dick Powell Show. The CBS Season 3 re-boot had aired on Sunday nights at 10 pm, but NBC moved the time slot to 7:30 pm Monday, and Season 4 began airing on October 5, 1959, with a 17-episode run that concluded late in January. Because its numbers were no longer strong, the season's nine additional episodes were delayed, resuming only as a summer replacement on Tuesday, July 5, 1960, and concluding in early September. Though the old noirish elements were more prominent, the final season's look seems inspired more by cost-cutting than aesthetics, and the production values appear far less glamorous than Season 3.

In addition to Janssen, the series had other recurring characters. Mirroring Diamond's history with the New York Police Department, the radio version featured his friend, police Lt. Walt Levinson (often played by Ed Begley, Sr.), and on TV, veteran actor Regis Toomey, portraying Diamond's former superior, Lt. Dennis "Mac" McGough, came aboard in the first episode, which aired in July 1957. Toomey then appeared intermittently in seven more, including “Snow Queen,” the final episode of Season 2, which aired on June 26, 1958. Radio's version also gave Diamond a steady girl friend, wealthy socialite Helen Asher (played by Virginia Gregg), a story arc that was neglected by television until the first episode of Season 3, when Diamond meets fashion designer Karen Wells, played by Barbara Bain. But this may have created a conundrum for the producers, since radio's Diamond was also an unrestrained flirt, and Powell's character often shamelessly ogled his beautiful clients before returning to Helen each week. In one TV episode, “Soft Touch,” Karen catches Diamond about to two-time her, and after five episodes, the “steady-girl-friend” arc had disappeared, with Diamond once again playing the field. When he first reached Los Angeles, Diamond had no history with the local police, and his encounters with them are often contentious. In Season 4, Russ Conway was cast as Lieutenant Pete Kile for five episodes, and their relationship soon turns to one of mutual respect, if not always warmth. The omnipresent Sam entered the picture (at least partially—viewers never saw much of her face) in Season 3 and remained for the duration of the series. She was played for most of Season 3 by Mary Tyler Moore in her first regular series role, and later replaced by Roxane Brooks.

=== Cast ===
- David Janssen as Richard Diamond
- Regis Toomey as Lt. Dennis "Mac" McGough (seasons 1–2)
- Russ Conway as Lt. Pete Kile (season 4)
- Barbara Bain as Karen Wells (season 3)
- Mary Tyler Moore as Sam (season 3)
- Roxane Brooks as Sam (seasons 3–4)

=== Television guest stars ===
- Nick Adams
- Philip Ahn
- Charles Aidman
- Claude Akins
- Frank Albertson
- Jack Albertson
- Chris Alcaide
- Merry Anders
- John Anderson
- Eleanor Audley
- Phyllis Avery
- Joanna Barnes
- Baynes Barron
- Patricia Barry
- Harry Bartell
- Arthur Batanides
- Barbara Baxley
- Don Beddoe
- Ed Begley
- Harry Bellaver
- Russ Bender
- John Beradino
- James Best
- Edward Binns
- Joey Bishop
- Patricia Blair
- Whitney Blake
- Dan Blocker
- Willis Bouchey
- Lane Bradford
- Jocelyn Brando
- Steve Brodie
- Charles Bronson
- Hillary Brooke
- Geraldine Brooks
- Robert Burton
- King Calder
- Charles Cane
- Richard Carlyle
- Jack Cassidy
- John Cliff
- Phyllis Coates
- Marian Collier
- Joe Conley
- Ellen Corby
- Jerome Cowan
- Dennis Cross
- Christopher Dark
- Ted de Corsia
- Francis De Sales
- King Donovan
- Richard Devon
- Brad Dexter
- Lawrence Dobkin
- James Drury
- Don Durant
- Jack Elam
- Ross Elliott
- Tommy Farrell
- James Flavin
- Dick Foran
- Robert Foulk
- Douglas Fowley
- Robert Gist
- Ned Glass
- John Goddard
- Barry Gordon
- Saul Gorss
- Tom Greenway
- Dabbs Greer
- Virginia Gregg
- Don Haggerty
- Kipp Hamilton
- Peter Hansen
- Stacy Harris
- Edmund Hashim
- Irene Hervey
- Bern Hoffman
- Jonathan Hole
- James Hong
- Clegg Hoyt
- John Hoyt
- Robert Karnes
- Don Keefer
- DeForest Kelley
- Sandy Kenyon
- Jess Kirkpatrick
- Gail Kobe
- Charles Lane
- Joi Lansing
- Harry Lauter
- Ruta Lee
- Peter Leeds
- Bethel Leslie
- Nan Leslie
- Lisa Lu
- Keye Luke
- John Lupton
- Ross Martin
- Carole Mathews
- Ken Mayer
- Sean McClory
- Howard McNear
- Joyce Meadows
- Joseph Mell
- Troy Melton
- Eve Miller
- John Mitchum
- Rita Moreno
- Vic Morrow
- James Nolan
- Jeanette Nolan
- Jay Novello
- Alan Reed
- Richard Reeves
- Stafford Repp
- Addison Richards
- Mark Roberts
- Carlos Romero
- Hayden Rorke
- Mort Sahl
- Walter Sande
- Gloria Saunders
- William Schallert
- Jacqueline Scott
- Karen Sharpe
- Fred Sherman
- Doris Singleton
- Lyle Talbot
- Gloria Talbott
- Vaughn Taylor
- Lee Van Cleef
- Herb Vigran
- June Vincent
- Alan Wells
- James Westerfield
- Jesse White
- Jean Willes
- Gloria Winters

== Television episode list ==
=== Season 1: 1957 ===
No. overall	No. in season	Title	Directed by	Written by	Original release date
1	1	"The Mickey Farmer Case"	Roy Del Ruth	Richard Carr	July 1, 1957
2	2	"Custody"	Tom Gries	Ellis Marcus	July 8, 1957
3	3	"Escape from Oak Lane"	Tom Gries	Edmund Morris	July 15, 1957
4	4	"The Homicide Habit"	Unknown	Unknown	July 22, 1957
5	5	"Picture of Fear"	Oscar Rudolph	David T. Chandler	July 29, 1957
6	6	"Hit and Run"	Oscar Rudolph	Ellis Arnold Kadison	August 5, 1957
7	7	"The Big Score"	Oscar Rudolph	David T. Chandler	August 12, 1957
8	8	"The Chess Player"	Mark Sandrich Jr.	Philip MacDonald	August 19, 1957
9	9	"The Torch Carriers"	Bernard Kowalski	Gene Levitt	August 26, 1957
10	10	"The Pete Rocco Case"	Bernard Kowalski	Richard Carr	September 9, 1957
11	11	"Venus of Park Avenue"	Mark Sandrich Jr.	George Worthing Yates & David T. Chandler	September 16, 1957
12	12	"Merry-Go-Round Case"	Roy Del Ruth	Richard Carr	September 23, 1957

=== Season 2: 1958 ===
No. overall	No. in season	Title	Original release date
13	1	"The Space Society"	January 2, 1958
14	2	"The Dark Horse"	January 9, 1958
15	3	"The Payoff"	January 16, 1958
16	4	"Double Jeopardy"	January 23, 1958
17	5	"Arson"	January 30, 1958
18	6	"The Ed Church Case"	February 6, 1958
19	7	"Chinese Honeymoon"	February 13, 1958
20	8	"Rodeo"	February 20, 1958
21	9	"A Cup of Black Coffee"	February 27, 1958
22	10	"The George Dale Case"	March 6, 1958
23	11	"Juvenile Jacket"	March 13, 1958
24	12	"Pension Plan"	March 27, 1958
25	13	"Short Haul"	April 10, 1958
26	14	"Another Man's Poison"	April 17, 1958
27	15	"The Purple Penguin"	April 24, 1958
28	16	"Lost Testament"	May 1, 1958
29	17	"The Percentage Takers"	May 8, 1958
30	18	"Widow's Walk"	May 22, 1958
31	19	"Bungalow Murder"	May 29, 1958
32	20	"One Foot in the Grave"	June 12, 1958
33	21	"Snow Queen"	June 26, 1958

=== Season 3: 1959–60 ===
No. overall	No. in season	Title	Original release date
34	1	"The Sport"	February 15, 1959
35	2	"Pack Rat"	February 22, 1959
36	3	"Body of the Crime"	March 1, 1959
37	4	"Soft Touch"	March 8, 1959
38	5	"Boomerang Bait"	March 15, 1959
39	6	"Matador Murder"	March 22, 1959
40	7	"Murder at the Mansion"	March 29, 1959
41	8	"Marineland Mystery"	April 5, 1959
42	9	"Charity Affair"	April 12, 1959
43	10	"Two for Paradise"	April 19, 1959
44	11	"Crown of Silla"	May 3, 1959
45	12	"Jukebox"	May 10, 1959
46	13	"Echo of Laughter"	May 17, 1959
47	14	"The Limping Man"	May 24, 1959
48	15	"Hideout"	May 31, 1959
49	16	"Rough Cut"	June 7, 1959
50	17	"Family Affair"	June 14, 1959
51	18	"Design for Murder"	June 21, 1959
52	19	"Hoodlum"	October 5, 1959
53	20	"Act of Grace"	October 12, 1959
54	21	"Bookie"	October 19, 1959
55	22	"The Client"	October 26, 1959
56	23	"The Runaway"	November 2, 1959
57	24	"No Laughing Matter"	November 9, 1959
58	25	"The Messenger"	November 16, 1959
59	26	"The Counselor"	November 23, 1959
60	27	"The Image"	November 30, 1959
61	28	"The Adjuster"	December 7, 1959
62	29	"Marked for Murder"	December 14, 1959
63	30	"The Caller"	December 21, 1959
64	31	"One Dead Cat"	December 28, 1959
65	32	"Dead to the World"	January 11, 1960
66	33	"Seven Swords"	January 18, 1960
67	34	"The Fine Art of Murder"	January 25, 1960

=== Season 4: 1960 ===
No. overall	No. in season	Title	Original release date
68	1	"The Popskull"	June 28, 1960
69	2	"And Whose Little Baby Are You?"	July 5, 1960
70	3	"Fallen Star"	July 19, 1960
71	4	"Coat of Arms"	August 2, 1960
72	5	"Double Trouble"	August 9, 1960
73	6	"The Lovely Fraud"	August 16, 1960
74	7	"Accent on Murder"	August 23, 1960
75	8	"East of Danger"	August 30, 1960
76	9	"Running Scared"	September 6, 1960
77	10	"The Mouse"	September 13, 1960

== Adaptations ==
In 1968, Four Star president David Charnay announced a feature film revival starring David Janssen, but nothing came of the plans. A pair of unauthorized Richard Diamond short stories set in 1948 were published in book form in 2016.
