= Jonathan Hole =

American actor (1904–1998)

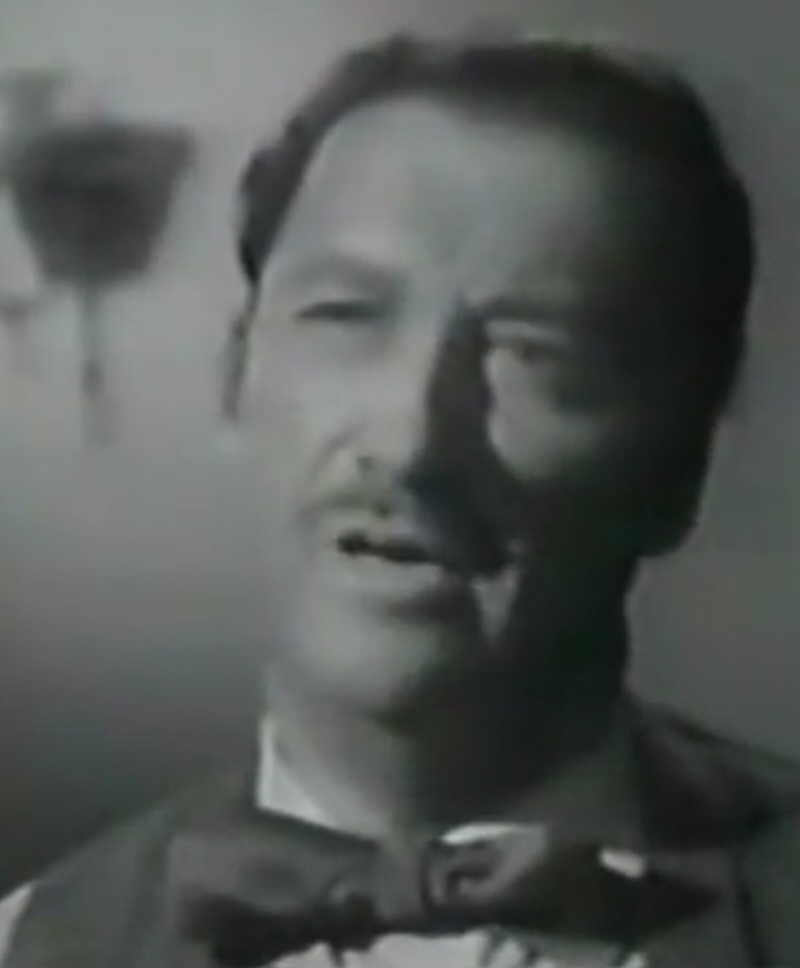
- Jonathan Hole in an episode of One Step Beyond (1960)
- Born: August 13, 1904; Eldora, Iowa, U.S.
- Died: February 11, 1998 (aged 93); Los Angeles, California, U.S.
- Resting place: Westwood Village Memorial Park, Los Angeles; 34.0583427°N 118.4406350°W
- Occupation: Actor
- Years active: 1951–1990
- Spouse: m. 1931: Betty Hanna (1903–1976)
- Children: David Jon Hole Jennifer Jane Hole

Jonathan Foreman Hole (August 13, 1904 – February 11, 1998) was an American actor whose entertainment career covered five genres over 65 years. From his early days on the vaudeville stage and in legitimate theater, through radio, television and feature-length films that took his career up to the 1990s, Hole created a variety of characters in hundreds of roles.

== Early years ==
Hole was born in Eldora, Iowa, the son of Mr. and Mrs. H. E. Hole. He graduated from North High School in Des Moines and attended Drake University.

== Career ==
Hole's career began in vaudeville in the 1920s. He further honed his acting skills during 1924–1934 in stage productions in New York. In 1926, he joined the Morgan Wallace players as stage manager at the Princess Theater in Des Moines, Iowa. By the end of 1929, he had also performed with stock theater companies in Brooklyn, New York; Dayton, Ohio; Lynn, Massachusetts; and Portland, Maine. In 1930, one of the productions he appeared in was the comedy Cinderelative that had been written by Dorothy Heyward.

Hole was also a radio performer active in his native Iowa as well as New York City, Detroit, Chicago, and Los Angeles, California. While working as an announcer on WBBM in Chicago, his last name was temporarily changed to Cole by the station. In 1942 in Chicago, Hole was a co-chair of the Red Cross entertainment committee on war relief. He portrayed Paul Henderson on the radio soap opera Ma Perkins.

In 1951, he began acting in movies with a part in the Marie Windsor, Steve Brodie vehicle Two-Dollar Bettor. Although his appearances were usually uncredited, he appeared in thirty-six feature-length films. Among those were A Man Called Peter in 1955, Beloved Infidel in 1959, 4 for Texas in 1963 and The Graduate in 1967.

Hole carved out a long career in television, beginning in 1951 with an appearance on Hollywood Theatre Time, in the episode Mr. Young's Sprouts, which starred Gale Storm and Don DeFore. He often made repeat appearances on television shows, appearing in multiple episodes playing different roles. He appeared seven times each in Dragnet, Burke's Law, and Green Acres. He appeared in five Maverick episodes, and five times on CBS's Perry Mason. Hole appeared twice on ABC's The Life and Legend of Wyatt Earp, with Hugh O'Brian. He appeared in episodes 5 and 48 of Batman. Twice he played the part of Elmer Clark on Walter Brennan's The Real McCoys. Hole also guest starred on The Andy Griffith Show as Orville Monroe, the undertaker. He made 200 appearances in 121 television shows and made-for-television movies. Although he played a variety of parts, he was perhaps most frequently seen in comic roles, often as a fussy and somewhat self-important clerk, manager, or minor bureaucrat. His final television appearance was in Silhouette, a 1990 murder mystery starring Faye Dunaway.

During his early years in Hollywood his day job was at the California Employment Development Department.

== Personal life and death ==
On April 7, 1931 in Manhattan Hole married actress Elizabeth Jane "Betty Hanna" Hanawalt (1903–1976), whom he met when they acted together in Dayton, Ohio. He died in North Hollywood in 1998 at age 93, and is buried with his wife at Westwood Memorial Park in Los Angeles.

== Stage work ==
Partial listing, New York stage productions only

Theatre
Opening date	Closing date	Title	Role	Setting	Genre	Playwright	Theatre
August 13, 1924	Aug 1924	Dr. David's Dad	Eric	The Bronx	Comedy	Armin Friedmann, Louis Nerz; Book adapted by Carrington North and Joseph J. Garren	Vanderbilt Theatre
January 26, 1928	Feb 1928	57 Bowery	Terry	New York City	Comedy	Edward Locke	Wallack's Theatre
September 18, 1930	Sept 1930	Cinderelative	Horace J. Hill	Paris, New York	Comedy	Dorothy Heyward, Dorothy De Jagers	Artef Theatre
Nov 9, 1931	Nov 1931	Peter Flies High	Peter Turner	Rosedale, New Jersey	Comedy	Myron Coureval Fagan	Gaiety Theatre
August 1, 1932	August 8, 1932	Chamberlain Brown's Scrap Book	Station Announcer, Francis Cameron	a vaudeville theatre	Vaudeville music revue		Ambassador Theatre
December 26, 1932	Jan 1933	The Little Black Book	H. D. Porter	Washington, D.C.	Comedy, drama	Harold Sherman	Selwyn Theatre
December 25, 1933	Jan 1934	The Locked Room	John Burgess Jr.	New York City	Melodrama	Herbert Ashton Jr.	Ambassador Theatre
October 15, 1934	Dec1934	Lost Horizons	David Prescott	Canada, United States	Fantasy	Harry Segall, script revision by John Hayden	St. James Theatre

== Television ==
- 1951 Hollywood Theatre Time
- 1952–1955 Dragnet (7 episodes).... Clifton Allen / Charles Elliott / Paul West / Martin Tanner/ Wilbur Trench
- 1954 Mayor of the Town....Rogers
- 1954 Fireside Theater....Mike
- 1954 Lux Video Theatre....Hotel Clerk
- 1955 Climax!
- 1955 Ford Theatre....Dr. Stanley
- 1956 Highway Patrol....Roger Taylor
- 1956 TV Reader's Digest....Cartwright
- 1954–1956 Four Star Playhouse (2 episodes)....Harold / Hotel Clerk
- 1956 Crossroads
- 1956 The Adventures of Hiram Holliday....Master of Ceremonies
- 1956 Studio 57 (2 episodes)....Clerk
- 1957 How to Marry a Millionaire....Clerk
- 1957 Have Gun – Will Travel....Elkins
- 1957 The Adventures of Jim Bowie....Dr. Fry
- 1957 Wanted Dead or Alive The Spur episode .... Bartender
- 1958 The Gray Ghost....Barker
- 1957–1958 Hey, Jeannie! (3 episodes)....Durkee / Mr. Carter / Frazer
- 1958 Cheyenne....Gerald Banks
- 1958 Zorro (3 episodes)....Alfredo
- 1958 The Lineup
- 1958 Leave It to Beaver....Bank Teller
- 1958 Perry Mason....Arthur Williams
- 1958 Maverick ("Shady Deal at Sunny Acres")....Desk Clerk / Fred Wiggins
- 1958 Yancy Derringer....Emmet Proctor
- 1958 Trackdown....Coroner Petrie
- 1958 The Thin Man....Mr. Lansing – Pigeon Club Director / Committeeman
- 1959 Dick Powell's Zane Grey Theatre....Ned Watley
- 1959 Wanted: Dead or Alive....Roy the Bartender
- 1959 The Ann Sothern Show....Manager
- 1957–1959 State Trooper (2 episodes)....Harry Stack / Art Dealer
- 1959 Peter Gunn.....Leeds
- 1959 Cimarron City....Mortimer Kleckley
- 1959 Bat Masterson....Mart – Barfly
- 1958–1959 Mike Hammer (2 episodes)....Herman K. Berman / Man in Hotel Room
- 1957–1959 The Gale Storm Show (2 episodes)....Mr. Pool
- 1958–1959 Trackdown (2 episodes)....Mike Kilroy / Coroner Petrie
- 1959 Tales of Wells Fargo....Burns
- 1959 The David Niven Show....Gus
- 1959 Markham....the Chef
- 1959 M Squad....Arthur Leslie
- 1959 Not for Hire....Willoughby
- 1957–1959 The Life and Legend of Wyatt Earp (2 episodes)....Mr. Carp / Nathaniel Cooker / Heber Morse
- 1959 Fury....Ben Carr
- 1959 Bronco....Carver
- 1957–1960 Richard Diamond, Private Detective (3 episodes)....Bank Manager / Virgil Twinkham / Colin
- 1960 The Dennis O'Keefe Show....George Roebuck
- 1960 Alcoa Presents: One Step Beyond....Mr. Johnson- Landlord
- 1958–1960 Maverick (5 episodes)....Fred / Marvin Dilbey / San Francisco Jeweler / Brent Williams / Desk Clerk
- 1960 The Deputy....Mr. Curzon
- 1960 Twilight Zone....Team Doctor
- 1960 Bourbon Street Beat....Mr. Maywearing (uncredited)/ Psychiatrist
- 1960 Perry Mason Stanley Roderick, toupee expert
- 1960 Angel....Mr. Davis
- 1960–1961 The Andy Griffith Show....Orville Monroe
- 1960–1961 Lock-Up (2 episodes)....Horace Sobel / Clerk at Galieote's
- 1961 Pete and Gladys....Inspector Perkins
- 1961 The Many Loves of Dobie Gillis....Mr. Mimms
- 1961 The New Bob Cummings Show
- 1961 The Detectives Starring Robert Taylor....Head Waiter
- 1961 Alcoa Premiere....Elliott
- 1960–1961 Bachelor Father (2 episodes)....Mr. Cribbens / Mr. Sinclair
- 1962 My Three Sons....Mr. Tully
- 1961–1962 87th Precinct (2 episodes)....Mr. Benton
- 1962 The Jack Benny Program (2 episodes)
- 1962 The Real McCoys ....Elmer Clark
- 1962 GE True....Fenwick
- 1960–1963 Dennis the Menace (3 episodes)....Addison Brock / Mr. Trumble / Mr. Bradshaw
- 1962–1963 The Wide Country (2 episodes)....Clerk / Henry Meyers
- 1962–1963 The Real McCoys....Elmer Clark
- 1963 Temple Houston....T.T. Teague
- 1960–1964 Rawhide (4 episodes)
  - Rawhide (1960) – Josiah Grimby in S2:E23, "Incident of the Stargazer"
  - Rawhide (1961) – Lawyer in S3:E30, "Incident of the Wager on Payday"
  - Rawhide (1962) – Otis Eames in S4:E20, "Grandma's Money"
  - Rawhide (1964) – Drummer in S6:E15, "Incident of the Rusty Shotgun"
- 1958–1964 Perry Mason (5 episodes)....Whitey / Edward Link / Stanley Roderick / Everett Wormser / Arthur Williams
- 1964 The Addams Family....Professor Simms
- 1964 My Living Doll....Mr. Whitson
- 1964 Bob Hope Presents the Chrysler Theatre....Fred Walters
- 1961–1964 Bonanza (2 episodes)....Dr. Kleiser / Hershell
- 1964 The Outer Limits....The Pedestrian
- 1961–1965 Hazel (3 episodes)....Mr. Wilson / Fulton / Personnel Manager
- 1965 The Rogues (2 episodes)....Hotel Clerk / Teller
- 1965 The Alfred Hitchcock Hour....The Hotel Clerk
- 1965 The Donna Reed Show....Mr. Martindale
- 1963–1965 Burke's Law (7 episodes)....Digby / Mr. Alexander / George / Mr. Swift the Auctioneer / Art Lecturer / Henry Newbold / Airlines Official
- 1965 Ben Casey....Dr. Pinchney
- 1965 Petticoat JunctionS2;Ep34....Mr. Earnshaw
- 1965 The Patty Duke Show....Jack Ralston
- 1964–1966 My Favorite Martian (2 episodes)....Walter Poppe / William Stone
- 1966 Laredo....Millford Jenkins
- 1965–1966 Honey West (2 episodes)....Mr. Gruder / Chemist Grady
- 1964–1966 The Farmer's Daughter (3 episodes)....Albert / Mr. Stanley / Mr. Gridley
- 1966 Summer Fun....Nichols
- 1966 Occasional Wife....Druggist
- 1966 The Man from U.N.C.L.E.....Dr. Zohmer
- 1966 Batman (episodes 5 and 48)....Jewelry Store Owner / Museum Attendant
- 1966 Please Don't Eat the Daisies....Clerk / Court Clerk
- 1966–1967 The Lucy Show (3 episodes)....Jonathon Winslow / Mr. Haskell / Collins
- 1966–1967 I Dream of Jeannie (2 episodes)....Clerk / Van Weesen
- 1967 Rango (Episode: "Shootout at Mesa Flats")....Sweeper
- 1967 The Wild Wild West....The Bank Manager
- 1963–1968 The Virginian (4 episodes)....Hotel Clerk / Stage Depot Clerk / Coroner
- 1967–1968 The Guns of Will Sonnett (3 episodes)....Clevenger / Rob Quail / Clerk
- 1967–1969 The Flying Nun (2 episodes)....Process Server – Acting as Tourist / 2nd Ornithologist
- 1969 The Name of the Game....Victor Masters
- 1967–1969 The Big Valley (2 episodes)....Clerk / Beckett
- 1969 The Mod Squad....Mr. Levero – Caretaker
- 1969 The Debbie Reynolds Show....Gourmet Proprietor
- 1964–1969 Petticoat Junction (4 episodes)....Hank Thackery / Mr. Earnshaw / Mr. Bunce
- 1966–1970 Bewitched (3 episodes)....Mr. Waterman / Manager / Principal
- 1970 Barefoot in the Park
- 1970 The Over-the-Hill Gang Rides Again....Parson
- 1970 Hallmark Hall of Fame
- 1966–1970 Green Acres (7 episodes)....Clerk / Claxton / Mr. Fortney / Announcer (voice) / Mr. Powers
- 1971 Adam-12....Paul Weber
- 1970–1971 The Brady Bunch (2 episodes)....Wally Witherspoon / Thackery
- 1972 Call Her Mom....Trustee #3
- 1968–1973 Here's Lucy (2 episodes)....Mr. Dinwitty / Floorwalker
- 1972 The Smith Family Winner Take All....Mr. Minnick
- 1973 McCloud....Mr. Darwin
- 1972–1973 Love, American Style (2 episodes)....Junk Shop Proprietor (segment "Love and the Three-Timer") / Omar (segment "Love and the Super Lover")
- 1974 Cannon
- 1974 Kung Fu....Hobbs
- 1975 Ellery Queen....Dress Shop Manager
- 1982 Father Murphy....Hotel Manager
- 1985 Hotel....Charlie
- 1989 Moonlighting....Chip
- 1987–1989 Highway to Heaven (2 episodes)....Desk Clerk / Clerk
- 1990 Silhouette...Man in Hotel (final film role)

== Films ==
- 1951: Two-Dollar Bettor .... Race Track Drunk Bettor (uncredited)
- 1952: My Pal Gus .... Judge (uncredited)
- 1953: The Glory Brigade .... Col. Peterson (uncredited)
- 1953: The Kid from Left Field .... Truant Officer (uncredited)
- 1953: A Blueprint for Murder .... Dr. Stevenson (uncredited)
- 1954: Riot in Cell Block 11 .... Reporter Russell
- 1954: Woman's World .... Executive Reception Guest (uncredited)
- 1954: The Bob Mathias Story .... Olympics Reporter (uncredited)
- 1954 Men of the Fighting Lady announcer
- 1955: A Man Called Peter .... Church Elder (scenes deleted)
- 1955: Headline Hunters .... Fred Finley – Drunk (uncredited)
- 1955: Illegal .... Doctor (uncredited)
- 1956: Ransom! .... Dan – Telephone Technician (uncredited)
- 1956: The Opposite Sex .... Phelps Potter
- 1956: Three Brave Men .... Pharmacist Gibbons (uncredited)
- 1957: Slander .... Cereal Company Executive (uncredited)
- 1957: Top Secret Affair .... Mr. Jones, Process Server (uncredited)
- 1957: The Way to the Gold .... Mr. Felton
- 1957: Kiss Them for Me .... Nightclub Manager (uncredited)
- 1958: Cry Terror! .... Airline Executive
- 1958: The Decks Ran Red .... Mr. Adams
- 1959: Cast a Long Shadow .... Charlie Boles (uncredited)
- 1959: The Man Who Understood Women .... Interviewer at Premiere (uncredited)
- 1959: -30- .... Pettifog
- 1959: The Four Skulls of Jonathan Drake .... Funeral Director (uncredited)
- 1959: Beloved Infidel .... Dr. Hoffman (uncredited)
- 1962: Moon Pilot .... Hotel Clerk (uncredited)
- 1963: 4 for Texas .... Renée, headwaiter on Riverboat
- 1964: Looking for Love .... Store Owner (uncredited)
- 1964: I'd Rather Be Rich .... Clergyman (uncredited)
- 1967: Eight on the Lam .... Jewelry Salesman (uncredited)
- 1967: The Graduate .... Mr. Singleman (uncredited)
- 1968: The Impossible Years .... Homeowner (uncredited)
- 1968: The Split .... Ticket Seller (uncredited)
- 1969: Some Kind of a Nut .... Second Vice President
- 1969: The Computer Wore Tennis Shoes .... Scientist (uncredited)
- 1969: My Dog, the Thief .... Jewelry Store Clerk
- 1970: The Wacky Zoo of Morgan City .... Official
- 1971: The Million Dollar Duck .... Refinery Agent (uncredited)
- 1978: Till Death .... Mr. Hutton
