= Don Chastain =

American actor

- Chastain in The Debbie Reynolds Show, 1969
- Born: September 2, 1935; Oklahoma City, Oklahoma, U.S.
- Died: August 9, 2002 (aged 66); Los Angeles, California, U.S.
- Occupations: Actor; singer; screenwriter
- Spouse: Jill Diamond
- Children: 1

Don Chastain (September 2, 1935 – August 9, 2002) was an American actor, singer, and screenwriter. He worked in television in Los Angeles and New York and toured the United States and Canada.

== Early years ==
Chastain was born in Oklahoma City, Oklahoma.

== Acting ==
Chastain's Broadway credits include Parade (1998), 42nd Street (1980), It's a Bird...It's a Plane...It's Superman (1965), and No Strings (1961).

He played Jim Thompson in the TV comedy The Debbie Reynolds Show (1969–1970) and Scott Thomas in the TV comedy Hello, Larry (1979–1981).

He penned the screenplay for The Mafu Cage (1978) and wrote several episodes of As the World Turns (1992–1995).

In 1960, Chastain appeared as Gerald Wiley in the episode "Trial by Rope" of the TV series Colt .45. The guest cast also included Pamela Duncan as Dora Lacey, and Lurene Tuttle as Lottie Strong. Other series in which Chastain appeared as a guest star include The Real McCoys, Rhoda, Maude, The Rockford Files, All My Children, Hawaii Five-O, The West Wing, Gunsmoke, Scrubs, Emergency! and The Big Valley.

He appeared in the role of Lizard in the 1970 film of C.C. and Company.

One of Chastain's final roles on TV was as a “suspect” On the television reality competition show “Murder in Small Town X” in 2001 as character Hayden DeBeck. He was featured for 6 episodes before being “killed” by the show's fictional killer.

== Music ==
Chastain was a jazz singer and lyricist who served in the United States Army.

== Personal life ==
Don Chastain died August 9, 2002, of cancer in Los Angeles. He was 66.

== Broadway performances ==
- No Strings (1962–1963)
- It's a Bird...It's a Plane...It's Superman (1966)
- 42nd Street (1980–1989)
- Dance a Little Closer (1983)
- Parade (1998–1999)
