= Chevron Hall of Stars =

American television series (1956)

- Country of origin: United States

Production
- Producer: Warren Lewis
- Running time: 30 minutes
- Production company: Four Star Television

Original release
- Release: 1956

Chevron Hall of Stars is an American television anthology series which aired in 1956 in first-run syndication. It was produced by Four Star Productions, and was a half-hour series.

Gene Roddenberry’s script The Secret Weapon of 117 was broadcast on the series on March 6, 1956. Another 1956 episode was an unsuccessful pilot for a Captain Kidd TV series. It featured Anthony Dexter in the title role, Denton De Gray as Scar, Danny Green as Morgan, and Christopher Lee as the governor.

The November 22, 1956, episode, "Double Cross", featured Don Taylor as detective Richard Diamond.

Warren Lewis was the producer.

== Notable guest stars ==
- Gene Barry
- Lloyd Bridges
- Raymond Burr
- Dane Clark
- Charles Coburn
- Noreen Corcoran
- Angie Dickinson
- Sally Fraser
- Beverly Garland
- Phyllis Kirk
- Angela Lansbury
- Joan Leslie
- John Litel
- Thomas Mitchell
- Ricardo Montalbán
- Maureen O'Sullivan
- Richard Reeves
- Cesar Romero
- Lee Van Cleef
- James Whitmore
- Alan Young

== See also ==
- The Star and the Story – another "Four Star Productions" anthology series which aired in first-runs syndication.
