= Annie Fargé =

French actress (1934–2011)

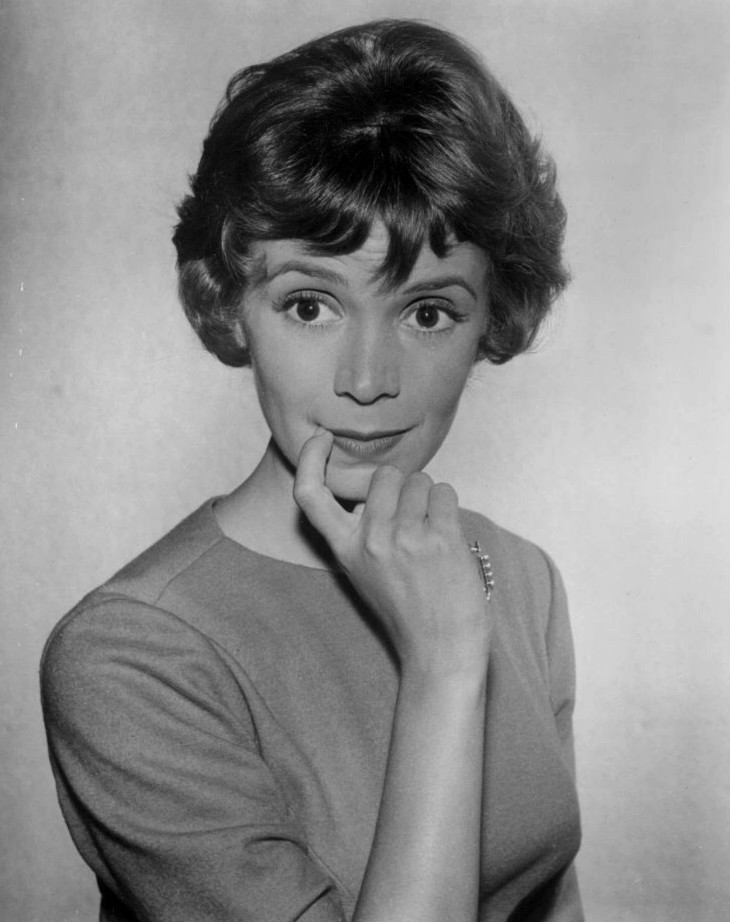
- Annie Fargé in 1960
- Born: Henriette Goldfarb; 15 April 1934; Etterbeek, Belgium
- Died: 4 March 2011 (aged 76); Neuilly-sur-Seine, Hauts-de-Seine, France
- Occupation: Actress
- Spouse: Dirk Sanders (divorced)
- Children: Leslie Tabuteau

Annie Fargé (15 April 1934 – 4 March 2011) was a French actress who worked for a few years on U.S. television and was named "most promising new star in a situation comedy" in 1961 when she played the title role in CBS's Angel. Especially in Europe, she was often credited as "Annie Fargue".

== Early life ==
Born in Belgium as Henriette Goldfarb, she escaped the country with her family before the Nazi occupation. She wanted to become an actress; her mother opposed the idea, but relented when Fargé was accepted at the Conservatoire National.

== Career ==
Fargé traveled to New York and later married dancer Dirk Sanders. The couple had a daughter, Leslie Tabuteau, who was born shortly before Angel began filming in April 1960 and eventually became a French TV producer.

Broadway producer Joshua Logan discovered Fargé and had her take English lessons. At the time of casting for the television series, Fargé was an understudy in the Broadway production of The World of Suzie Wong. She was signed for the Angel role by producer Jess Oppenheimer on the basis of CBS executive Robert Lewine's recommendation. Oppenheimer did not elect to do a screen test.

The Angel pilot did not impress the network, but when Lewine screened it for sponsors S. C. Johnson and General Foods, both sponsors were sufficiently impressed to tell the network executive to put the show on the air or they would cancel their sponsorship of all CBS programs. Fargé played Angelique "Angel" Smith, the scatterbrained French wife of American architect John Smith, played by Marshall Thompson. Doris Singleton was her sympathetic neighbor Susie, and Don Keefer was Susie's husband George. The show was filmed at Desilu Studios. The series ran for 33 episodes. After Angel folded due to low ratings, Fargé appeared as a guest star in a few other series, including The Rifleman, as Jennifer Morrison, and Adventures in Paradise.

Her last American television appearance was in a 1964 episode of Perry Mason, "The Case of the Betrayed Bride", as she played the role of defendant Marie Claudel.

Fargé divorced her husband and returned to France in the mid-1960s. Upon her return to France, Fargé became a theatrical producer (Hair, Godspell, Oh! Calcutta!, Jesus Christ Superstar) and was associate producer for the 1981 John Huston film Escape to Victory. She later became the manager of French singer Michel Polnareff.

== Death ==
Fargé died of cancer in Neuilly-sur-Seine, aged 76, on 4 March 2011.

== Selected filmography ==
=== Theater ===
- 1952 La Jeune Madragor, mis en scène par Gérard Philippe (TNP)
- 1952 Nucléa, de Henri Pichette mis en scène par Jean Vilar et Gérard Philippe (TNP)
- 1953 Sud, de Julie Green mis en scène par Jean Mercure avec Anouk Aimée (Théâtre de l'Athénée)
- 1954 Les Petites Filles Modèles, mis en scène par Jean-Pierre Grenier (Théâtre des Quatre Saisons)
- 1955 Andréa ou la Fiancée du Matin, mis en scène par Sacha Pitoeff avec Jean Louis Trintignant (Théâtre de l'Oeuvre)
- 1955 Juanito le Séducteur Ingénu, de Pierre Humblot mis en scène par Louis Ducreux avec Françoise Fabien.
- 1956 Chaud et Froid, de et mis en scène par Crommmelynck avec Claude Gensac (Théâtre de l'Oeuvre)
- 1956 La Patate, de Marcel Achard (Théatre Saint Georges)
- 1957 L'histoire de Vasco, Compagnie Jean Louis Barrault – (Théâtre Sarah Bernhardt)
- 1957 Monsieur de France, de Jacques François, mis en scène par Christiant Gérard with Jacques François (Théatre des Bouffes Parisiennes)
- 1958 Am-Stram-Gram, d'André Roussin avec Claude Nico (Théâtre des Nouveautés)
- 1959 Le Petit Monde de Suzie Wong, de Paul Osborn mis en scène par Joshua Logan avec William Shatner (Broadhurst Theater)
- 1966 Témoignage Irrecevable, de John Osborne, mis en scène by Claude Réguy (Théâtre des Mathurins)
- 1967 L'Anniversaire, de Harold Pinter mis en scène par Claude Réguy avec Michel Bouquet, Jean-Pierre Mariel et Bernard Fresson (Théâtre Antoine)
- 1967 Au Petit Bonheur, de Marc Gilbert Sauvageon, mis en scène par Pierre Sabbagh avec Alain Pralon (Théâtre Marigny)

=== Movie and television ===
- 1954: L'affaire Maurizius (de Julien Duvivier) as Melita Bobike (uncredited)
- 1955: M'sieur la Caille (de André Pergament) as La puce
- 1956: Le revizor ou L'inspecteur général (TV movie) as Maria
- 1960-1961: Angel (TV Series) as Angel Smith (33 episodes)
- 1961: The Rifleman (TV Series) as Jennifer Morrison in S4 E15 "The Princess" aired 7/13/1961
- 1962: Paradise Island (TV Series) as Suzanne
- 1963: The Third Man (TV series) as Suzy Renaud-Dupin
- 1964: Kraft Suspense Theatre (TV Series) as Yvette Duval
- 1964: Perry Mason (TV Series) as Marie Claudet
- 1965: Fragilité, ton nom est femme (Short, de Nadine Trintignant)
- 1966: Le train bleu s'arrête 13 fois (TV Series) as Simone
- 1966: La guerre est finie (de Alain Resnais) as Agnès
- 1967: Les cinq dernières minutes (TV Series) as Jacky
- 1967: Mon amour, mon amour (de Nadine Tringnant) as Jeanne
- 1967: Malican père et fils (TV Series) as Nicole
- 1967: L'amateur ou S.O.S. Fernand (TV Series)
- 1968: La prisonnière (de Henri Georges Clouzot)
- 1968: Je t'aime je t'aime (de Alain Resnais) as Agnes Smet (final film role)
