= Angel (1960 TV series) =

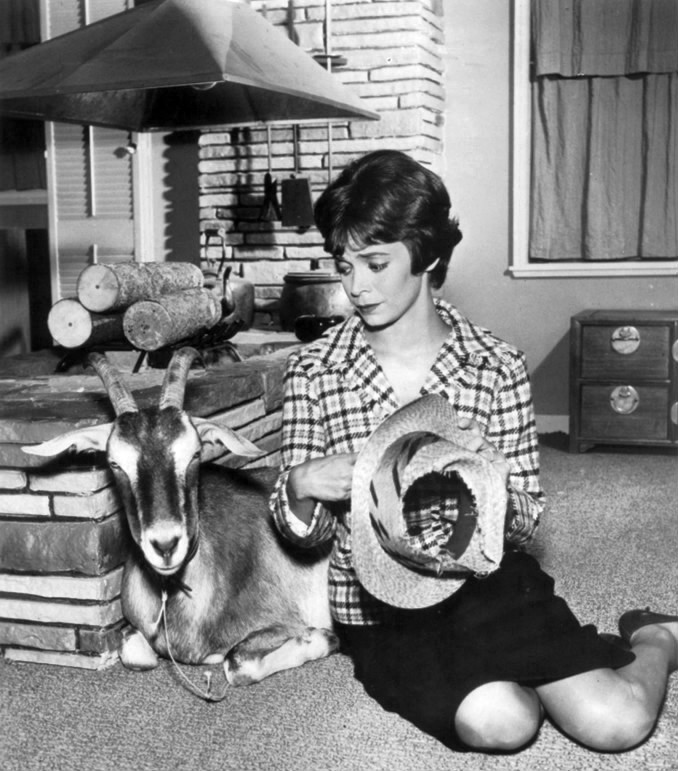
- Angel Smith with her "Goat Dog", a wedding gift from Uncle Jacques (1961)
- Genre: Sitcom
- Created by: Jess Oppenheimer
- Directed by: Lamont Johnson; Ezra Stone
- Starring: Annie Fargé; Marshall Thompson; Doris Singleton; Don Keefer
- Theme music composer: Eliot Daniel; Jess Oppenheimer
- Composers: Eliot Daniel; Wilbur Hatch
- Country of origin: United States
- Original language: English
- No. of seasons: 1
- No. of episodes: 33

Production
- Executive producer: Jess Oppenheimer
- Producer: Edward H. Feldman
- Camera setup: Multi-camera
- Running time: 22–24 minutes
- Production companies: Burlingame Productions; CBS Films (filmed at the studios of Desilu)

Original release
- Network: CBS
- Release: October 6, 1960 – June 14, 1961

Angel is an American sitcom that aired on CBS October 6, 1960 - September 20, 1961. The series was created and produced by Jess Oppenheimer, and stars Annie Fargé as the title character.

== Synopsis ==
Angel Smith, a petite Frenchwoman, comes to the United States and marries a young architect, John Smith. With her distinct French accent, Angel gets into various problems with the culture, language, and procedures in her new country.

== Cast ==
The series co-starred Marshall Thompson as Angel's husband, Doris Singleton as Angel's neighbor, Susie and Don Keefer as Susie's husband George.

== Production ==
Angel was initially broadcast at 9 pm Eastern on Thursday evenings. In December 1960 it was moved to 8-8:30 p.m. E. T. on Thursdays. In April 1961 it was moved to Wednesdays from 9 to 9:30 p.m. E. T.

Oppenheimer was the executive producer of the series for the production division of CBS Films Inc. (a forerunner to what would be known as Viacom Productions) in its only network offering under the name. Lamont Johnson and Ezra Stone were the directors. The sponsor was General Foods Corporation. Three cameras were used to film episodes with a studio audience.

The name Angelique Bouchard would later be used for a main character on the soap opera Dark Shadows, portrayed by Lara Parker. Angie Smith's maiden name, Bouchard, was revealed in episode 32, "The Wedding."

== Reception and cancellation ==
Earlier, Time magazine had commented that Fargé "triumphantly resists being merely Lucille Ball with a French accent. She is easily the brightest newcomer to situation comedy—small, pert, winsome, and somehow giving the impression of being attractively feathered." Angel Smith's relation to her husband was different from that as seen on I Love Lucy, and Fargé liked that the scripts had the husband "wearing the pants" in the family, stating at that time that this was a more realistic way a French woman would feel. Despite the good personal reviews, Fargé left U.S. television within a few years for a career in France. She was often credited by her real name, "Annie Fargue".

== Guest stars ==
- Denise Alexander
- Madge Blake
- Mel Blanc
- Bobby Diamond
- Ross Elliott
- Stuart Erwin
- James Garner
- Ned Glass
- Gale Gordon
- Jonathan Hole
- Dennis Holmes
- Lamont Johnson
- Joseph Kearns
- Tommy Kirk
- Lou Krugman
- Dayton Lummis
- Howard McNear
- Don Megowan
- Stafford Repp
- Hanley Stafford
- Lyle Talbot
- Minerva Urecal
- Herb Vigran
- Jesse White
- Mary Wickes
- Frank Wilcox

== Episodes ==
No.	Title	Directed by	Written by	Original release date
1	"The French Touch"	Lamont Johnson	Jess Oppenheimer	October 6, 1960
2	"Voting Can Be Fun"	Lamont Johnson	Jack Elinson & Charles Stewart	October 13, 1960
3	"The Easy Touch: Angel and the Con Men"	Ezra Stone	Bill Davenport	October 20, 1960
4	"The Maid"	Lamont Johnson	Irving Elinson & Fred Fox	November 3, 1960
5	"Angel's Temper"	Jess Oppenheimer	Fred Fox & Irving Elinson	November 10, 1960
6	"Democracy"	Unknown	Unknown	November 17, 1960
7	"The Trusting Wife"	Unknown	Unknown	November 24, 1960
8	"The Contest"	Unknown	Unknown	December 1, 1960
9	"The Driving Lesson"	Unknown	Unknown	December 8, 1960
10	"The Valedictorian"	Ezra Stone	Roswell Rogers	December 15, 1960
11	"The Museum"	Lamont Johnson	Roswell Rogers	December 22, 1960
12	"Togetherness"	Unknown	Unknown	December 29, 1960
13	"The Goat Dog"	Unknown	Unknown	January 5, 1961
14	"The Dowry"	Unknown	Unknown	January 19, 1961
15	"Happy Marriage"	Unknown	Unknown	January 26, 1961
16	"The Joint Bank Account"	Unknown	Unknown	February 2, 1961
17	"Call Me Mother"	Ezra Stone	Arthur Alsberg	February 9, 1961
18	"The Second Marriage"	Unknown	Unknown	February 16, 1961
19	"The French Lesson"	Ezra Stone	Bill Davenport	February 23, 1961
20	"Little White Lies"	Unknown	Unknown	March 2, 1961
21	"House Guests"	Unknown	Unknown	March 9, 1961
22	"Phone Fun"	Ezra Stone	Joe Quillan	March 23, 1961
23	"The Insurance Policy"	Ezra Stone	Joe Quillan	March 30, 1961
24	"The Dentist"	Ezra Stone	Arthur Alsberg	April 6, 1961
25	"The Honest Man"	Unknown	Unknown	April 13, 1961
26	"Unpopular Mechanics"	Unknown	Unknown	April 19, 1961
27	"The Guided Tour"	Unknown	Unknown	April 26, 1961
28	"The Littlest Leaguer"	Unknown	Unknown	May 3, 1961
29	"The Trailer"	Unknown	Unknown	May 10, 1961
30	"Goodbye, Young Lovers"	James Sheldon	Bill Davenport	May 17, 1961
31	"Angel of Mercy"	Ezra Stone	Joe Quillan	May 24, 1961
32	"The Wedding"	Unknown	Unknown	June 7, 1961
33	"Promise to a Friend"	Unknown	Unknown	June 14, 1961
