= Bog (film) =

- Theatrical poster
- Directed by: Don Keeslar
- Written by: Carl Kitt
- Produced by: Michelle Marshall
- Starring: Gloria DeHaven; Aldo Ray; Marshall Thompson; Leo Gordon
- Cinematography: Jack Willoughby
- Edited by: John Montonaro
- Music by: Bill Walker
- Production companies: Bog Productions; Nelsen Communications
- Distributed by: Marshall Films
- Release date: May 1979 (Albany, Georgia)
- Running time: 90 minutes
- Country: United States
- Language: English

Bog is a 1979 American independent horror film directed by Don Keeslar and starring Gloria DeHaven, Aldo Ray, Marshall Thompson, and Leo Gordon.

== Plot ==
Dynamite fishing in a rural swamp revives a prehistoric gill monster that lives on the blood of human females. When a local is fishing with dynamite in Bog Lake, something larger pops to the surface: a green bug-eyed monster awakened from a long sleep, which promptly begins killing fishermen who stumble across its lair. When biologist Ginny Glenn (Gloria DeHaven) discovers the creature's evolutionary nature, the local sheriff decides to use various methods to destroy the beast. Eventually the monster is killed after it is rammed with a truck, but its eggs remain.

== Cast ==
- Gloria DeHaven as Ginny Glenn / Adrianna
- Aldo Ray as Sheriff Neal Rydholm
- Marshall Thompson as Dr. Brad Wednesday
- Leo Gordon as Dr. John Warren
- Glen Voros as Alan Tanner
- Rohay North as Chuck Pierce
- Carol Terry as May Tanner
- Lou Hunt as Kim Pierce
- Ed Clark as Deputy Jensen
- Robert Fry as Wallace Fry
- Leroy Winbush as Terry Taylor
- Dan Killian as Bill Beckley
- Don Daniel as Jim Hotchkiss
- Charles Pitt as Deputy Corbett
- Chris Harris as Deputy Siegel
- Allen Krebs as extra in gun shop

== Release ==
The film was given a limited release theatrically in the United States by Marshall Films in 1979. It was subsequently released on VHS by Prism Entertainment Corporation. The film was released on DVD by Trinity Home Entertainment on Nov 1, 2005 and in Canada later that year by Maple Pictures. It was released twice by Allegro Corporation, both in 2011. Dark Force Entertainment released it on Blu-Ray in the U.S. in June 2023 along with Mako The Jaws of Death.

== Reception ==
Leonard Maltin awarded the film 1 star or BOMB, calling the film "Ultra-cheap" and "[an] ultra-bad time-killer". In his book Horror Films of the 1970s, film critic and independent filmmaker John Kenneth Muir gave the film 1 out of a possible 4 stars. In his review, Muir wrote, "They don't make movies like Bog anymore and we can all be grateful for that. This is a monster film made by people with only the most rudimentary knowledge of how to assemble a film. It is poorly acted, shot, written, and edited. It also commits the cardinal sin of being boring."
