= Doris Singleton =

American actress (1919–2012)

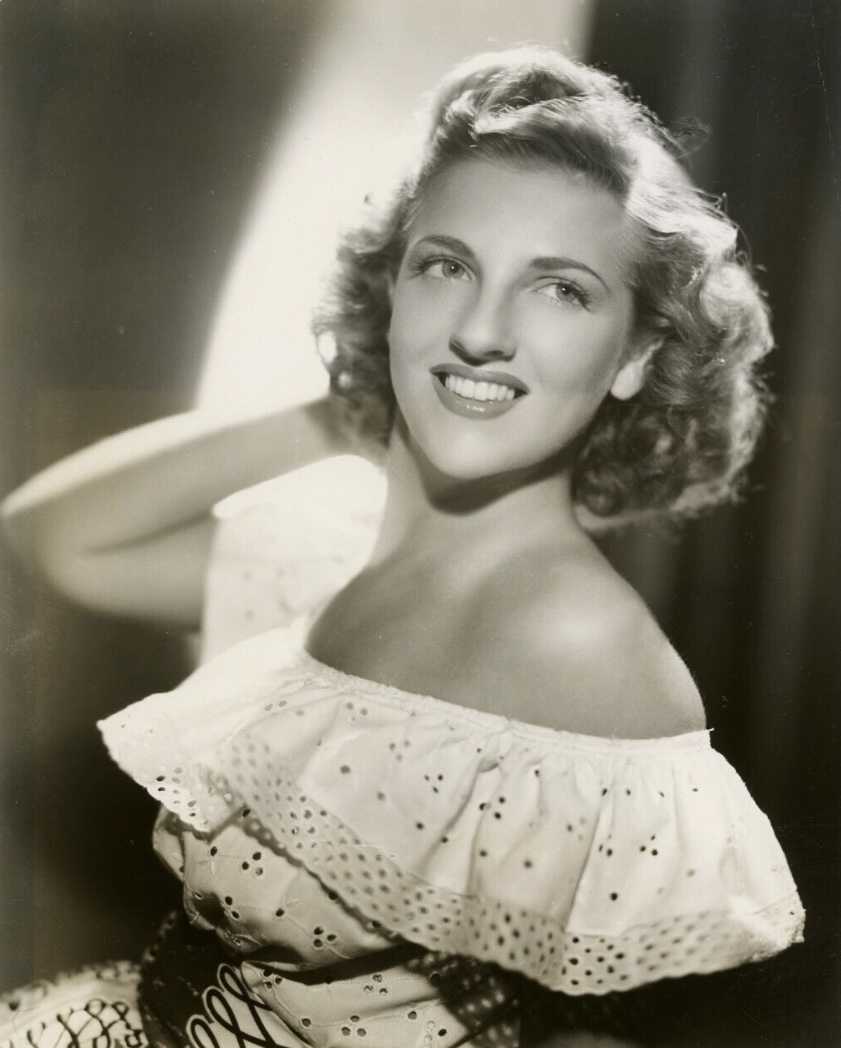
- Singleton in 1946
- Born: Dorthea Singleton; September 28, 1919; New York City, U.S.
- Died: June 26, 2012 (aged 92); Los Angeles, California, U.S.
- Occupations: Actress, vocalist
- Years active: 1930s–1986
- Spouse: Charles Isaacs (m. 1941; died 2002)

Dorthea "Doris" Singleton (September 28, 1919 – June 26, 2012) was an American actress, perhaps best remembered as Lucy Ricardo's frenemy, Carolyn Appleby, in I Love Lucy.

== Early life and career ==
Singleton, born in New York City, trained as a ballerina, dancing for three seasons in the mid-1930s with the newly formed "Ballet Theatre", later to become the American Ballet Theatre. She began her career in show business as a vocalist in the late 1930s with Art Jarrett's orchestra.

Singleton worked in New York during World War II both as a guest star and in regular roles on numerous hit radio shows, including The Whistler and The Alan Young Show, on which she played Young's girlfriend, Betty Dittenfeffer. She played Ruth Henshaw on the radio version of December Bride.

During a guest appearance on the radio show My Favorite Husband in 1948 she met Lucille Ball and began their long professional relationship. She had a recurring role in I Love Lucy playing Carolyn Appleby in ten episodes between 1953 and 1957. (The character was named "Lillian Appleby" in her first appearance but "Carolyn Appleby" thereafter.) In 1953, she made her television debut as Gloria Harper in the episode "Jungle Devil" on the series, The Adventures of Superman. Coincidentally, Singleton's final appearance on I Love Lucy was in an episode with Superman George Reeves ("Lucy and Superman" episode #166).

Singleton played Lois in the syndicated television version of The Great Gildersleeve in 1954–1957. Singleton appeared on a 1955 episode of Alfred Hitchcock Presents entitled “Our Cook’s Treasure.” In 1956 and 1957, she appeared twice in The People's Choice. In 1962–1963, she played Tubby's mother in the comedy series McKeever and the Colonel.

In 1966, Singleton was teamed again with Ball on The Lucy Show in the episode, "Lucy and Art Linkletter", in which she plays Ruth Cosgrove, an actress whom Linkletter hires to help Lucy with a stunt on his television series. In an interview in The Lucy Book by Geoffrey Mark Fidelman (Renaissance Books, p. 233), Singleton revealed that she had originally been hired to be a regular on Ball's third series, Here's Lucy, in 1968. Ball would have played a dumb secretary and Singleton the more intelligent one, but the premise was dropped when Ball decided to cast her own children in the show. She did, however, appear in the series premiere episode, "Mod, Mod Lucy".

In 1970, Singleton was featured on an episode of ABC sitcom, Make Room For Granddaddy (an updated version of The Danny Thomas Show) which had Lucille Ball as the guest star. In this installment, titled "Lucy Carter, Houseguest", Singleton played Grace Munson, another character from I Love Lucy. Her final appearance on Here's Lucy was on March 4, 1974, in episode 22 of season 6 as Lucille Ball's studio secretary in an episode titled "Lucy (Carter) Meets Lucille Ball". Singleton and Ball were reunited one last time, again as Ball's studio secretary, in the 1980 special Lucy Moves to NBC.

Singleton also appeared on numerous other television shows including Richard Diamond, Private Detective, Mickey Spillane's Mike Hammer, The Dick Van Dyke Show, Pete and Gladys, Hazel, The Real McCoys, The Twilight Zone, The Munsters, The Fugitive, Dynasty, Phyllis, Family Affair, Hogan's Heroes, Gomer Pyle - U.S.M.C., State Trooper, Gunsmoke, and Frontier Doctor.

Singleton played the sympathetic neighbor, Susie, to Annie Fargé's scatterbrained character "Angel Smith" in the CBS sitcom, Angel from 1960 to 1961. Singleton also appeared in All in the Family as Edith's hotel roommate, Lydia Stonehurst, in the 1971 episode "Edith has Jury Duty". She also appeared in two Perry Mason episodes, titled "The Case of the Crooked Candle" and "The Case of the Purple Woman".

She guest-starred on My Three Sons, playing two different characters who had recurring roles throughout the long run of the show. She originally played the mother of Meredith MacRae whose character Sally Morrison married original oldest son Mike Douglas (Tim Considine) in the 1964–65 season. Later she played Margaret, mother of Polly Williams (Ronne Troup) in the 1970–71 season. At the time of her death in June 2012, Singleton was the last surviving major recurring adult cast member from the "Lucy" shows. Her last major acting role was in Deadly Messages (1985), though she appeared in advertising and voice overs for many subsequent years, most notably in recurring ads for Hills Brothers' Coffee.

== Personal life ==
Singleton married comedy writer, director, and producer Charles Isaacs in 1941, and they remained married until he died on December 13, 2002.

== Later life and death ==
Singleton resided in the Greater Los Angeles area. She died in Los Angeles in 2012, aged 92, from complications of cancer. She had no children and left no immediate survivors.

== Selected filmography ==
- Alfred Hitchcock Presents (1955) (Season 1 Episode 8: "Our Cook's a Treasure") as Secretary
- Terror at Midnight (1956) as Linda (uncredited)
- Affair in Reno (1957) as Nora Ballard
- Gunsmoke (1962) (Season 8 Episode 8: "The Trappers") as Goldigger Irma
- My Three Sons (1965) (Season 5 Episode 34: “All the Weddings”) as Helen Morrison
- Amelia Earhart (1976) as Mary-Jacky
- Deadly Messages (1985) Marge
