= December Bride (radio program) =

American radio situation comedy (1952–1953)

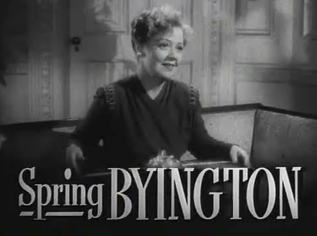
- Country of origin: United States
- Language: English
- Syndicates: CBS
- TV adaptations: December Bride
- Starring: Spring Byington; Doris Singleton; Hal March; Hans Conried; Alan Reed
- Announcer: Johnny Jacobs
- Created by: Parke Levy
- Written by: Parke Levy
- Directed by: Parke Levy
- Original release: June 8, 1952 – September 6, 1953

December Bride is an American old-time radio situation comedy. It was initially broadcast on CBS from June 8, 1952 to September 1952 as a summer replacement for The Jack Benny Program. In August 1952, December Bride was one of four sustaining CBS radio programs (along with the Steve Allen Show, Gunsmoke, and Horatio Hornblower) carried over into the fall "to test further their commercial potential." It ran at various times for another year on CBS Radio until September 6, 1953. CBS Television then broadcast a televised version of the program 1954–1959.

== Format ==
In On the Air: The Encyclopedia of Old-Time Radio, John Dunning described Lily Ruskin, the program's main character, as "the precise opposite of the stereotypical mother-in-law. A widow, Lily was a dear lady in every aspect." Other main characters in the program were Ruth Henshaw, Lily's daughter; Matt Henshaw, Ruth's husband; and their next-door neighbor, Pete Porter.

Lily wrote an advice column for a newspaper, and Matt was an architect.

== Personnel ==
The cast of December Bride is shown in the table below.

Character	Actor
Lily Ruskin	Spring Byington
Ruth Henshaw	Doris Singleton
Matt Henshaw	Hal March
Pete Porter	Hans Conried; Alan Reed

Source: On the Air: The Encyclopedia of Old-Time Radio (except as noted)

Johnny Jacobs was the announcer, and Wilbur Hatch provided the music. The program was created and directed by Parke Levy.

== Promotion ==
In December 1952, December Bride held a letter-writing contest with the topic "Why I like my Mother-in-law". The prize was a week's vacation for two to Palm Springs, including being the guests of Spring Byington while there.

== Critical response ==
A review in the trade publication Variety described the show's dialog as "zany" and said that Byington was "her usual delightful self as the mother-in-law". It summarized the premiere episode as "unpretentious hot-weather fare".
