= The Debbie Reynolds Show =

- Genre: Sitcom
- Created by: Jess Oppenheimer
- Directed by: Ezra Stone
- Starring: Debbie Reynolds; Don Chastain; Tom Bosley; Patricia Smith
- Opening theme: "With a Little Love (Just a Little Love)"
- Composers: Jack Marshall; Tony Romeo
- Country of origin: United States
- Original language: English
- No. of seasons: 1
- No. of episodes: 26

Production
- Producer: Jess Oppenheimer
- Running time: 22–24 minutes
- Production company: Filmways Television

Original release
- Network: NBC
- Release: September 16, 1969 – April 14, 1970

The Debbie Reynolds Show is an American sitcom which aired on the NBC television network during the 1969–70 television season. The series was produced by Filmways.

== Synopsis ==
Debbie Reynolds portrayed Debbie Thompson, a housewife married to Jim, a successful sportswriter for the Los Angeles Sun. Jim was portrayed by actor Don Chastain; his boss and brother-in-law was played by longtime television actor Tom Bosley. Reynolds' attempts to amuse herself were regarded as being reminiscent of those of Lucille Ball on Here's Lucy.

Creator/producer Jess Oppenheimer was the original producer and co-creator of I Love Lucy. The show also employed Bob Carroll Jr., and Madelyn Davis, two longtime Lucy writers.

NBC was selling advertising time for cigarette commercials against Reynolds' wishes (even though she was assured no cigarette ads would be seen during the program). After Reynolds threatened to quit the show, American Brands (formerly known as American Tobacco) withdrew sponsorship. To make up for NBC's lost ad revenue, Reynolds agreed to give back to the network their guarantee of a second year of airing the program, as well as an NBC-backed film, What's the Matter with Helen?, in which she starred, and her ownership in a subsequent NBC-produced series.

== Cast ==
- Debbie Reynolds as Debbie Thompson
- Don Chastain as Jim Thompson
- Patricia Smith as Charlotte Landers
- Tom Bosley as Bob Landers
- Bobby Riha as Bruce Landers, Bob and Charlotte's son.

== Episodes ==
No.	Title	Directed by	Written by	Original release date
1	"That's Debbie"	Ezra Stone	Jess Oppenheimer	September 16, 1969
2	"It's a Bird, It's a Plane, It's Debbie"	Ezra Stone	Gene Thompson and Stanley Ralph Ross	September 23, 1969
3	"In the Soup"	Jay Sandrich	Bill Idelson & Harvey Miller	September 30, 1969
4	"Married Men Can Always Get"	Ezra Stone	Story by : Gene Thompson & Stanley Ralph Ross; Teleplay by : Gene Thomspon & Joel Kane	October 7, 1969
5	"A Present for Jim"	Ezra Stone	Unknown	October 14, 1969
6	"The Bodyguard"	Ezra Stone	David Ketchum & Bruce Shelly	October 21, 1969
7	"The Paper Butterfly"	Unknown	Unknown	October 28, 1969
8	"To and From Russia with Love: Part 1"	Ezra Stone	Joseph Bonaduce & Ann Marcus	November 4, 1969
9	"To and From Russia with Love: Part 2"	Unknown	Joseph Bonaduce & Ann Marcus	November 11, 1969
10	"You Bet Your Wife"	Ezra Stone	Joseph Bonaduce & Ann Marcus	November 25, 1969
11	"The Swinging Singles"	Unknown	Unknown	December 2, 1969
12	"Diamonds Are a Girl's Worst Friend"	Unknown	Unknown	December 9, 1969
13	"Casanova's Kitten"	Unknown	Unknown	December 16, 1969
14	"Guru-vy"	Ezra Stone	Joseph Bonaduce & Ann Marcus	December 23, 1969
15	"You Shouldn't Be in Pictures"	Unknown	Joseph Bonaduce & Ann Marcus	December 30, 1969
16	"The Games (Married) People Play"	Unknown	Unknown	January 6, 1970
17	"Hurry for Our Side"	Unknown	Unknown	January 13, 1970
18	"Advice and Dissent"	Unknown	Unknown	January 20, 1970
19	"Nothing but the Truth"	Unknown	Unknown	February 3, 1970
20	"Mission Improbable"	Unknown	Unknown	February 10, 1970
21	"How to Succeed in the Stock Market Without Really Trying"	Unknown	Unknown	February 24, 1970
22	"Those Dangerous Years"	Unknown	Unknown	March 3, 1970
23	"Debbie Gets Jim Fired"	Unknown	Unknown	March 10, 1970
24	"Debbie's Return"	Unknown	Unknown	March 17, 1970
25	"The Producer"	Unknown	Unknown	March 24, 1970
26	"Where There's a Will, There's No Way"	Unknown	Unknown	April 14, 1970

== In popular culture ==
Monty Python's Flying Circus spoofed the series in a sketch primarily written by John Cleese and Graham Chapman entitled "The Attila the Hun Show". It pokes fun at The Debbie Reynolds Show (the opening title sequence in particular, which the Pythons closely parodied), as well as American comedy in general.
