= Marshall Thompson =

American actor (1925–1992)

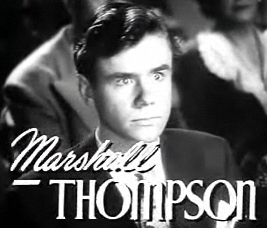
- Thompson in the trailer for Twice Blessed (1945)
- Born: James Marshall Thompson; November 27, 1925; Peoria, Illinois, U.S.
- Died: May 18, 1992 (aged 66); Royal Oak, Michigan, U.S.
- Education: Occidental College
- Occupations: Actor, screenwriter, director
- Years active: 1944–1991
- Spouse: Barbara Long (m.1949)
- Relatives: Richard Long (brother-in-law)

James Marshall Thompson (November 27, 1925 – May 18, 1992) was an American actor, screenwriter, and director of film and television. His film career began at the age of 19, spanning nearly 120 productions between 1944 and 1991.

== Early years ==
Thompson was born in Peoria, Illinois. His father was a dentist. He and his parents, Dr. Laurence B. Thompson and Pauline (née Marshall), moved to California when he was a year old. He attended University High School where he was a classmate of Norma Jean Baker, later to be known worldwide as Marilyn Monroe. Thompson enrolled at Occidental College with plans to become a dentist, but he switched to divinity studies.

== Career ==
=== 1940s ===
In 1943, Thompson, known for his boy-next-door good looks, was signed by Universal Pictures. He played quiet, thoughtful teens in Universal's feature films, including a lead opposite singing star Gloria Jean in Reckless Age, earning $350 weekly. During 1946, Universal discharged most of its contract players, so that same year Thompson moved over to MGM. His film roles steadily increased and improved with appearances in The Clock, the lead in Gallant Bess, MGM's first film shot in Cinecolor, and as one of the main stars in Battleground, as a green replacement in the 101st Airborne Division during the Siege of Bastogne.

=== 1950s ===
At the age of 24, Thompson narrated the storyline in Stars in My Crown (1950). He became a freelance actor during the 1950s and worked for various studios on a variety of pictures, including the horror and science fiction films Cult of the Cobra (1955), Fiend Without a Face (1958), and First Man Into Space (1959), as well as Audie Murphy's To Hell and Back (1955). His starring role as Carruthers in It! The Terror from Beyond Space (1958) was one of the two genre films that later inspired the plot for director Ridley Scott's 1979 big-budget feature Alien. Thompson also starred in the short-lived (13-episodes) 1959 syndicated science fiction TV series World of Giants. The drama follows Mel Hunter, a U. S. counter-espionage agent, accidentally miniaturized to just six inches in height, who must live in a dollhouse when not on missions.

=== 1960s ===
By the 1960s, Thompson's boyish looks had matured and his screen persona became more authoritative. He co-starred with the Belgian-born Annie Fargé in the 33-episode CBS sitcom Angel (1960–1961) about an American architect with a charming but scatterbrained French wife, who often got into zany, Lucy Ricardo-esque situations, caused in part by her lack of fluency in the English language. The show was canceled after 33 episodes due to low ratings, despite critical acclaim for newcomer Fargé.

He also guest starred as murderer Arthur Poe in the 1960 Perry Mason episode "The Case of the Wayward Wife".

Thompson went on to star in two Vietnam War films: A Yank in Viet-Nam (1964), which he also directed, and To the Shores of Hell (1965). The former was directed by Thompson and was shot on location in South Vietnam.

In 1965 he returned to MGM to play the lead in the Ivan Tors produced comedy-adventure film Clarence, the Cross-Eyed Lion (1965). He played Marsh Tracy, a veterinarian and single father, who is raising his daughter (played by animal whisperer and Golden Globe-winning Cheryl Miller) alone in Kenya. The film was then spun off into the TV series Daktari (1966–1969), in which Thompson played the same role. Since the series was shot in California and Africa, Thompson and his wife made several trips to various African nations to film second unit footage that was then used in the series and in the film The Mighty Jungle (1965).

Thompson also was the host and storyteller for the TV anthology series Jambo (1969–1971).

=== Later years ===
Later in his career, he appeared in many television episodes and in feature films such as The Turning Point (1977), the Don Keeslar-directed creature feature Bog (1979), and The Formula (1980).

== Personal life ==
Thompson married Barbara Long, making him a brother-in-law of actor Richard Long, and he had a daughter. Long portrayed Jarrod Barkley in ABC's The Big Valley. Thompson appeared together with his brother-in-law in the 1955 horror film thriller Cult of the Cobra.

Thompson supported Barry Goldwater in the 1964 United States presidential election.

=== Death ===
Thompson died on May 18, 1992, from congestive heart failure at age 66 in Royal Oak, Michigan.

== Filmography ==
=== Film ===
Thompson's 60+ film roles include:

- Henry Aldrich, Boy Scout (1944) - Senior Patrol Leader (uncredited)
- The Purple Heart (1944) - Morrison (uncredited)
- Reckless Age (1944) - Roy Connors
- Blonde Fever (1944) - Freddie Bilson
- The Clock (1945) - Bill
- The Valley of Decision (1945) - Ted Scott
- Twice Blessed (1945) - Jimmy
- They Were Expendable (1945) - Ens. 'Snake' Gardner
- Bad Bascomb (1946) - Jimmy Holden
- The Cockeyed Miracle (1946) - Jim Griggs
- The Show-Off (1946) - Joe Fisher
- Gallant Bess (1946) - Tex Barton
- The Secret Heart (1946) - Brandon Reynolds
- The Romance of Rosy Ridge (1947) - Ben Mac Bean
- B.F.'s Daughter (1948) - The Sailor
- Homecoming (1948) - Staff Sgt. 'Mac' McKeen
- Words and Music (1948) - Herbert Fields
- Command Decision (1948) - Captain George Washington Bellpepper Lee
- Scene of the Crime (1949) - Announcer at Fol De Rol Club (uncredited)
- Roseanna McCoy (1949) - Tolbert McCoy
- Battleground (1949) - Jim Layton
- Stars In My Crown (1950) - Narrator (voice)
- Mystery Street (1950) - Henry Shanway
- Devil's Doorway (1950) - Rod MacDougall
- Dial 1119 (1950) - Gunther Wyckoff
- The Basketball Fix (1951) - Johnny Long
- The Tall Target (1951) - Lance Beaufort
- My Six Convicts (1952) - Blivens Scott
- The Rose Bowl Story (1952) - Steve Davis
- The Caddy (1953) - Bruce Reeber
- Port of Hell (1954) - Marshall 'Marsh' Walker
- Battle Taxi (1955) - 2nd Lt. Tim Vernon
- Crashout (1955) - Billy Lang
- Cult of the Cobra (1955) - Tom Markel
- To Hell and Back (1955) - Johnson
- Good Morning, Miss Dove (1955) - Wilfred Banning Pendleton III
- Lure of the Swamp (1957) - Simon Lewt
- East of Kilimanjaro (1957) - Marsh Connors
- Fiend Without a Face (1958) - Maj. Cummings
- It! The Terror from Beyond Space (1958) - Col. Edward Carruthers
- The Secret Man (1959) - Dr. Cliff Mitchell
- First Man into Space (1959) - Cmdr. Charles Ernest Prescott
- Flight of the Lost Balloon (1961) - Dr. Joseph Farady
- No Man Is an Island (1962) - Jonn Sonnenberg
- A Yank in Viet-Nam (1964) - Maj. Benson
- The Mighty Jungle (1964) - Marsh Connors
- Zebra in the Kitchen (1965) - Shaving Man (uncredited)
- Clarence, the Cross-Eyed Lion (1965) - Dr. Marsh Tracy
- To the Shores of Hell (1966) - Maj. Greg Donahue
- Around the World Under the Sea (1966) - Dr. Orin Hillyard
- George! (1972) - Jim
- The Turning Point (1977) - Carter
- Cruise Into Terror (1978) - Bennett
- Bog (1979) - Dr. Brad Wednesday
- The Formula (1980) - Geologist #1
- White Dog (1982) - Director
- Dallas: The Early Years (1986, TV Movie) - Dr. Ted Johnson
- McBain (1991) - Mr. Rich (final film role)

=== Television ===
Thompson's 50+ television roles include:

- The Public Defender (1954) - Jeff Norton
- Science Fiction Theater (1955 - 1956) - Episodes "Stranger in the Desert", "The Frozen Sound", "Target Hurricane", "Bullet Proof", "The Human Experiment", "Three Minute Mile", "The Human Circuit"
- Gunsmoke (1958) - Leach Fields - episode "Widow's Mite" (S3E35)
- Colgate Theatre (1958), episode "The Last Marshal" (S1E2)
- World of Giants (1959, 13 episodes) - Mel Hunter
- Perry Mason (1960), episode "The Case of the Wayward Wife"
- Angel (1960–1961) - Johnny Smith
- Daktari (1966–1969) - Dr. Marsh Tracy
- George (1972) - Jim Hunter
- Centennial (1979 miniseries) - Dennis
