= December Bride =

American television series

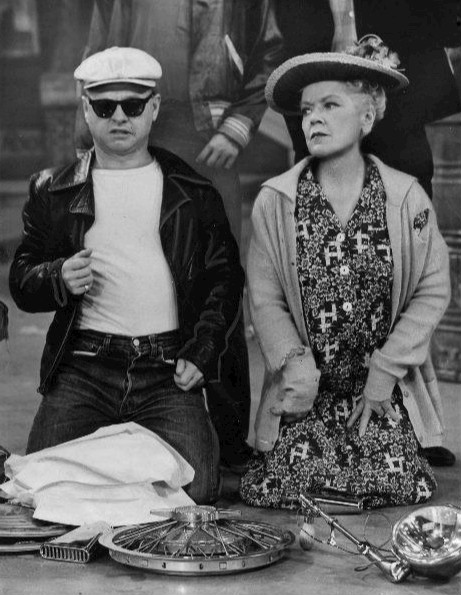
- Lily (Spring Byington) helps guest star Mickey Rooney with a crap game set up as a trap for those who robbed his home.
- Genre: Sitcom
- Created by: Parke Levy
- Written by: Bill Davenport; Lou Derman; Arthur Julian; Parke Levy; Bob Schiller
- Directed by: William Asher; Frederick de Cordova; Jerry Thorpe
- Starring: Spring Byington; Frances Rafferty; Dean Miller; Verna Felton; Harry Morgan
- Theme music composer: Eliot Daniel
- Composer: Wilbur Hatch
- Country of origin: United States
- Original language: English
- No. of seasons: 5
- No. of episodes: 156

Production
- Producers: Frederick de Cordova; Parke Levy
- Running time: 30 minute
- Production companies: Desilu Productions; CBS Television Network

Original release
- Network: CBS
- Release: October 4, 1954 – May 7, 1959

Related
- Pete and Gladys

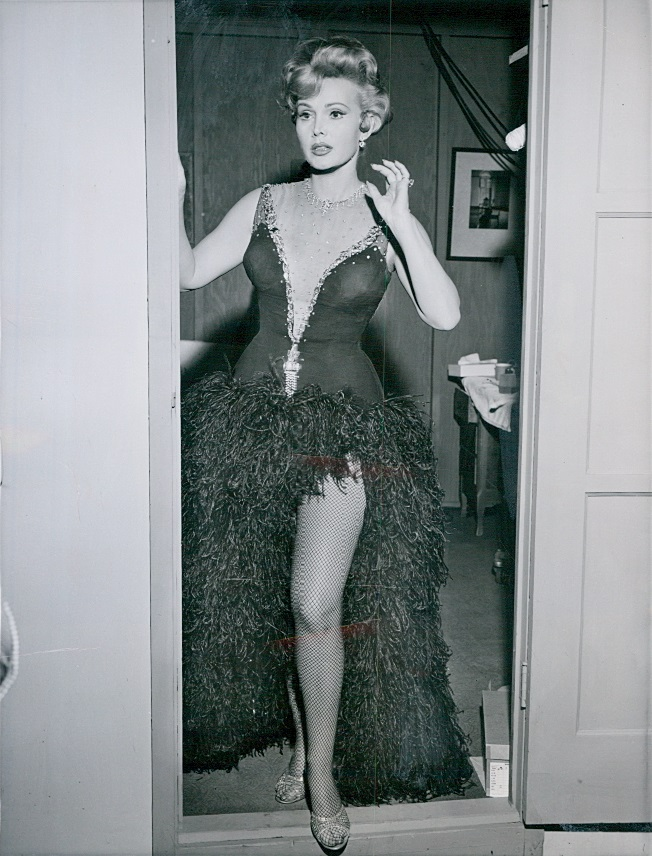
Zsa Zsa Gabor (1958)

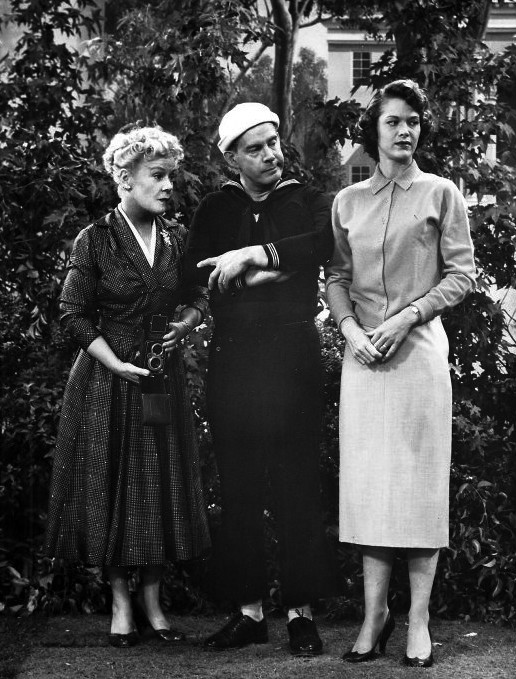
Spring Byington, Harry Morgan and Frances Rafferty

December Bride is an American sitcom that aired on the CBS television network from 1954 to 1959. It was adapted from the original CBS radio network series of the same name that aired from June 1952 through September 1953.

== Overview ==
December Bride centered on the adventures of Lily Ruskin, a spry widow played by Spring Byington. Ruskin was not, in fact, a "December" bride (married late in life), but she very much desired to become one, if the right man were to come along. Aiding Lily in her search for this prospective suitor were her daughter, Ruth Henshaw (Frances Rafferty), her son-in-law, Matt Henshaw (Dean Miller), and her close friend Hilda Crocker (character actress Verna Felton). A next-door neighbor, insurance agent Pete Porter (Harry Morgan), frequently appeared. Married miserably, according to his constant complaints about his unseen wife, Gladys, Pete despised his own mother-in-law and envied Matt's happy relationship with Lily. The pilot episode premiered on October 4, 1954, and involved Lily moving in with her daughter and son-in-law. Most of the series was set in the Henshaws' living room.

First-run episodes of December Bride aired on television for five seasons (1954–1959), sponsored by General Foods' Instant Maxwell House Coffee. During the first four seasons, the program was supplanted by "summer replacement" series (such as Ethel and Albert), but in its final year, reruns were shown in the same time slot during the summer hiatus.

Thanks in part to following I Love Lucy, December Bride had high ratings its first four seasons – number 10 in 1954–1955, number six in 1955–1956, number five in 1956–1957, and number nine in 1957–1958. When CBS moved it to Thursdays in the fall of 1958, ratings fell dramatically, and the series was cancelled in 1959.

In 1960, a new series titled Pete and Gladys debuted, set around many of the same characters. This spin-off series focuses on Pete Porter and his wife, now visible and played by comedian Cara Williams. The December Bride character Hilda Crocker, played by Verna Felton, appears in 23 episodes of Pete and Gladys, which aired until 1962.

After production had ceased, CBS used repeat episodes of December Bride to fill slots in its primetime programming. In July 1960, December Bride repeats filled the second half of the Friday 9 pm Eastern time slot vacated by Westinghouse Desilu Playhouse, running until the beginning of the fall schedule in 1960. The program served as a temporary replacement on Thursday nights in April 1961. December Bride repeats were shown on CBS as a daytime program from October 1959 to March 1961. The daytime reruns and an attempt to syndicate the show were ratings failures. His experience with December Bride encouraged CBS executive Michael Dann's use of "hammocking", framing a weak or new series between two established shows to improve its viewership.

== Cast ==
- Spring Byington as Lily Ruskin
- Frances Rafferty as Ruth Henshaw
- Dean Miller as Matt Henshaw
- Verna Felton as Hilda Crocker
- Harry Morgan as Pete Porter

=== Guest stars ===
- Desi Arnaz as himself
- Edgar Bergen as himself
- Madge Blake as Anita Henderson in "Family Quarrel" (1955) and as Margaret in "The Homecoming Show" (1957)
- Rory Calhoun as himself in "Rory Calhoun, the Texan"
- Harry Cheshire as Gus in "Lily Ruskin Arrives" (1954) and as Poole in "Big Game Hunter" (1955)
- Zsa Zsa Gabor as herself
- Fred MacMurray as himself
- Marjorie Main as herself
- Lyle Talbot, six episodes in different roles

== Ownership ==
Parke Levy, who created and wrote December Bride, owned 50% of the program, and Desilu and CBS owned 25% each.

== Episodes ==
| Season | Episodes | Originally released | | Rank | Rating |
| Season | Episodes | First released | Last released | Rank | Rating |
|---|---|---|---|---|---|
| 1 | 34 | October 4, 1954 | May 23, 1955 | 10 | 34.7 |
| 2 | 31 | October 3, 1955 | May 14, 1956 | 6 | 37.0 |
| 3 | 30 | October 8, 1956 | May 6, 1957 | 5 | 35.2 |
| 4 | 31 | October 7, 1957 | May 19, 1958 | 9 | 30.7 |
| 5 | 31 | October 2, 1958 | May 7, 1959 | —N/a | —N/a |

== Crew ==
DaLonne Cooper was the script supervisor.
