= Lucy and Superman =

- I Love Lucy episode
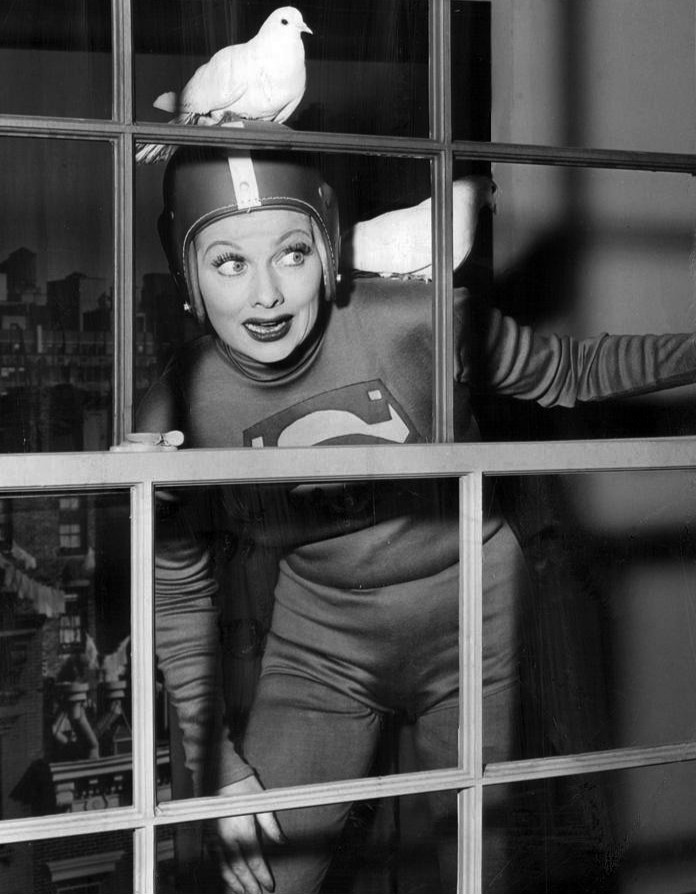
- Episode no.: Season 6 Episode 13
- Directed by: James V. Kern
- Written by: Bob Carroll, Jr.; Madelyn Pugh; Bob Schiller; Bob Weiskopf
- Production code: 167
- Original air date: January 14, 1957

Guest appearances
- George Reeves as Superman (credited by the series announcer Roy Rowan during the ending credits); Roy Rowan as TV Announcer (voice) (uncredited); Doris Singleton as Caroline Appleby (uncredited); George O'Hanlon as Charlie Appleby (uncredited); Steven Kay as Stevie Appleby (uncredited); Madge Blake as Martha (uncredited); Ralph Dumke as Martha's Husband (uncredited)

Episode chronology
← Previous "Lucy and the Loving Cup"	Next → "Little Ricky Gets a Dog"

"Lucy and Superman" is an episode of the sitcom I Love Lucy, and was first broadcast on January 14, 1957 on CBS. The episode was written by Bob Carroll, Jr., Madelyn Pugh, Bob Schiller and Bob Weiskopf. Directed by James V. Kern, it is the 13th episode of the sixth season, and the 166th episode of the series.

The episode features a guest appearance by George Reeves as Superman. His character is referred to as "Superman" throughout the episode (rather than "George Reeves" or "the actor who plays Superman"), with hints throughout the script meant to clue adult viewers in that the character is actually an actor.

After the closing credits, the disclaimer appeared on the screen that said: Superman Character, Feats and Narrative Copyrighted by National Comics Publications, Inc., 1956

== Plot summary ==
Bandleader Ricky Ricardo and his young son Little Ricky watch the latest episode of the Adventures of Superman television series, which concludes with the narrator stating that Superman will be making personal appearances in the coming week at Macy's Department Store in New York City. As Ricky's wife Lucy enters and sends her son to bed, she promises to take him to see Superman at Macy's. Ethel and Fred Mertz arrive and drop off favors for Little Ricky's fifth birthday party, which is scheduled for Saturday. Lucy and Ricky entertain Caroline and Charlie Appleby, whom the Ricardos consider to be good friends, except when they brag about their son Stevie, Little Ricky's best friend. Lucy and Caroline get into an argument when they realize that both of them have scheduled birthday parties for their sons on the same day. Neither will agree to change the date.

Because Stevie and Little Ricky are in the same class at school and have the same friends, Lucy worries that none of the children will attend Little Ricky's party, especially since Stevie's party will include a clown, puppet show and magician. Realizing that she must have more exciting entertainment for her son's party, Lucy convinces Ricky to ask Superman to appear at Little Ricky's party. Since Superman is in town, and since Ricky met him when the Ricardos and Mertzes visited Hollywood, Ricky agrees to ask him. Lucy promises her son that Superman will be there. Even Stevie wants to come to Little Ricky's party upon learning about Superman; thus, Caroline relents and changes the date of her son’s party. However, Ricky later calls and tells Lucy that Superman will be leaving town on Saturday and cannot appear at the party. Desperate to avoid disappointing Little Ricky, Lucy decides to dress up as Superman herself. She and Ethel hatch a plan whereby Lucy will use the vacant apartment next door to walk onto the ledge and enter through the window of the Ricardo apartment during the party, hoping to fool the children that she is the Man of Steel.

During the party on Saturday, Lucy dons her makeshift Superman costume (complete with a football helmet to hide her red hair) and steps onto the ledge, just as Ethel enters the vacant apartment with a pair of prospective tenants, who have arrived unexpectedly. Ricky returns home with the real Superman, who changed his plans once he heard that it was a child's birthday party. Delighted that the real hero came after all, Lucy turns to go back into the vacant apartment, but cannot do so because the prospective tenants are still there. It begins to rain as the couple prepares to leave, so they close the window, trapping Lucy outside on the ledge.

As the party ends and the children leave, Superman expresses regret that he has not had the chance to meet Lucy (about whom, he remarks, he has heard so much). When Ethel lets it slip that Lucy is on the ledge, Ricky and the Mertzes race to the window to find her still there, with her cape snagged on a drainpipe as the rain pours. At Little Ricky's suggestion, Superman goes out onto the ledge to rescue her. A furious Ricky screams that this is one of the craziest stunts Lucy has pulled in their entire fifteen years of marriage. Astonished to learn how long Ricky has been married to Lucy, the Man of Steel exclaims, "And they call me Superman!" Still on the ledge, an embarrassed Lucy turns to face the wall.

== Home media ==
In 1998, the episode was released on VHS as part of two separate compilations: "I Love Lucy Collection, Volume 5 - Lucy and Bob Hope/Lucy and Superman", and "I Love Lucy - The Classics: Lucy and Superman/The Freezer".

The episode was released on DVD in 2006 as part of the box set "I Love Lucy - The Complete Sixth Season".

== Colorized version telecast ==
CBS aired a colorized version of the episode on May 17, 2015, along with another colorized episode, "L.A., At Last," which guest starred actor William Holden as himself, in an hour-long TV special.

== See also ==
- List of I Love Lucy episodes
