= Ricky Ricardo Jr. =

Enrique Alberto Ricardo IV
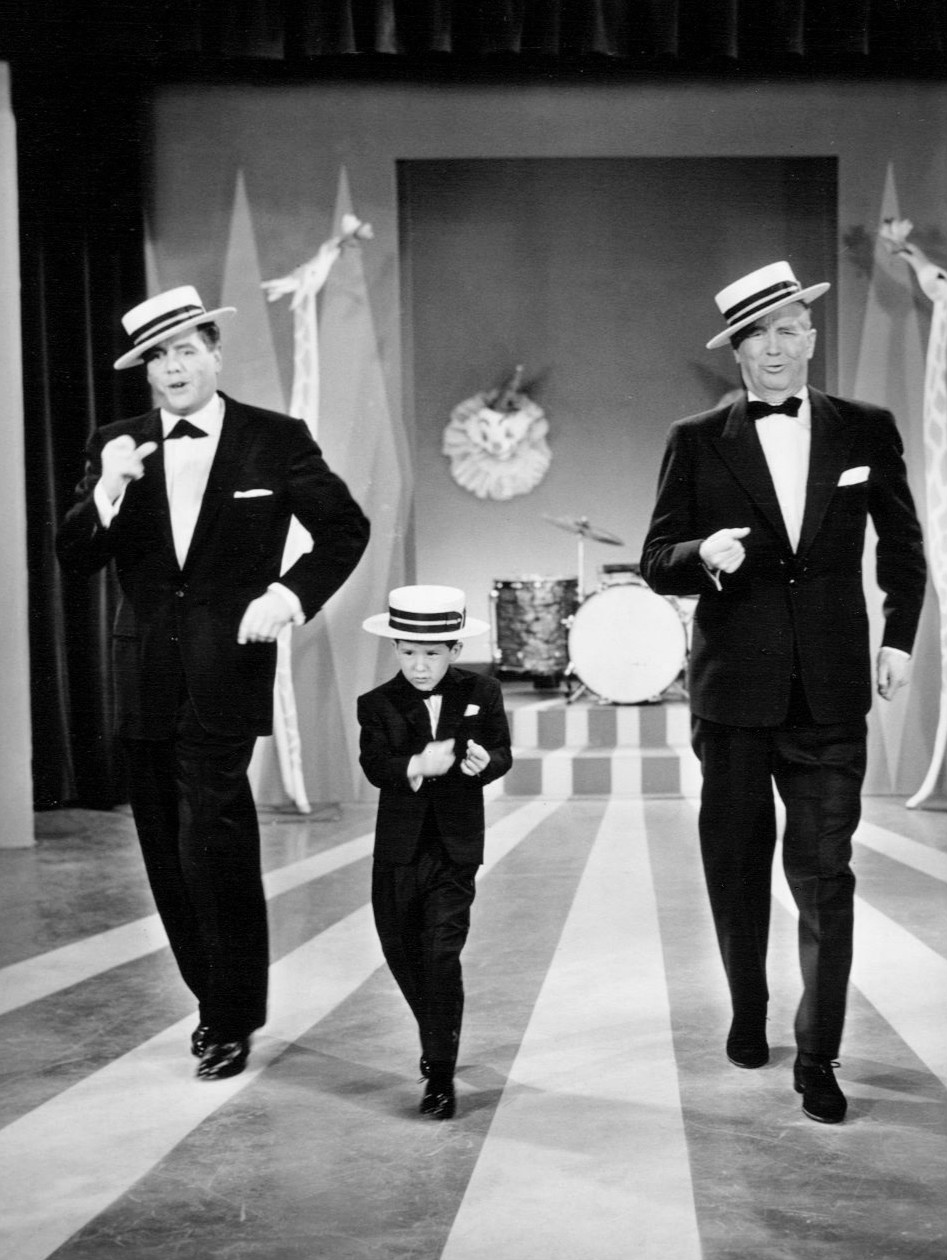
- Little Ricky (center), flanked by his father Ricky Sr. (left) and Maurice Chevalier (right)
- First appearance: "Lucy Goes to the Hospital"
- Last appearance: "Lucy Meets the Mustache"
- Portrayed by: James John Ganzer, Richard Lee Simmons, Ronald Lee Simmons, Michael Mayer, Joseph Mayer, Keith Thibodeaux

In-universe information
- Nickname: Little Ricky
- Gender: Male
- Occupation: Student, son, drummer
- Family: Lucy Ricardo (mother), Ricky Ricardo (father), Mrs. MacGillicuddy (Grandmother)
- Nationality: Mixed heritage Cuban and American of Scottish descent

Enrique Alberto Ricardo IV, better known as Little Ricky, is a fictional character from the American television series I Love Lucy (1951–57, with Ricky Jr. becoming a part of the show as of his birth in 1953) and The Lucy–Desi Comedy Hour (1957–60). Little Ricky is the son of Lucy and Ricky Ricardo. Little Ricky lives with his parents in a New York brownstone apartment building, which is owned and run by his godparents. During the series' final season, the family moves to a suburban house in Westport, Connecticut.

== Portrayers ==
Little Ricky was played by a number of actors. In utero, he was portrayed by who would become Desi Arnaz Jr., as Lucy Ricardo's pregnancy coincided with the pregnancy of her portrayer Lucille Ball; the show's writers decided shortly before Desi Jr.'s birth that Little Ricky would be a boy, as Ball and Desi Arnaz Sr. already had a daughter (Lucie Arnaz) and, since it would likely be the 41-year-old Ball's last pregnancy, it might have been Arnaz Sr.'s only opportunity to father a boy. When Desi Jr. was indeed born male, writer Jess Oppenheimer joked that he was "the greatest writer in the world." Those who portrayed Little Ricky after birth included James John Ganzer and two sets of twins (following television policy at the time): Richard and Ronald Lee Simmons, and Michael and Joseph Mayer. He was also played by two unidentified older actors, a boy and a man, as part of a dream sequence in "Ricky's Old Girlfriend". When Little Ricky was aged to an older child, Keith Thibodeaux, a child prodigy drummer, was hired to portray Little Ricky and was credited solely as "Little Ricky" throughout his time on the show. (He would assume the stage name Richard Keith after The Lucy-Desi Comedy Hour ended.)

Because of his work on I Love Lucy, Thibodeaux would spend much time and become close friends with Desi Arnaz Jr. and Lucie Arnaz; he would eventually teach Arnaz Jr. how to drum, which Arnaz Jr. would later put to use as a member of Dino, Desi & Billy.

== Fictional character biography ==
Lucy finds out she was expecting Little Ricky on the Season 2 episode "Lucy is Enceinte." The episode in which he is born, "Lucy goes to the Hospital," was aired on January 19, 1953, the same day as the birth of Lucille Ball's actual son, Desi Arnaz Jr.

- Mother: Lucy Ricardo, played by Lucille Ball
- Father: Ricky Ricardo, played by Desi Arnaz
- Maternal Grandmother: Mrs. MacGillicuddy, played by Kathryn Card
- Godfather: Fred Mertz played by William Frawley
- Godmother: Ethel Mertz played by Vivian Vance
- Babysitter: Mrs. Matilda Trumball played by Elizabeth Patterson
- Classmates: Stevie Appleby and Bruce Ramsey.

Little Ricky's father buys him a set of drums in the season 6 episode "Little Ricky Learns to play the Drums," after he shows he can carry a beat while tapping his spoon on a glass during a family breakfast. His parents enroll him in a music school where he is the only drummer, where he forms a band named "Ricky Ricardo and the Dixieland Band." Little Ricky experiences stage fright before his first music school recital but seems to overcome stage fright as he performs comfortably in many other episodes, such as "The Ricardos Visit Cuba," where he plays the conga drum alongside his father; "Little Ricky's School Pageant," where he plays the lead; and "Ragtime Band," where Little Ricky plays the drums alongside his mother and godparents.

== Episode appearances ==
Season and episode number	Episode title	Actor portraying Little Ricky	Little Ricky's involvement in episode
2.16	"Lucy Goes to the Hospital"	James John Ganzer	There is only one scene in which Little Ricky appears, when the baby is brought to the maternity ward window for Ricky and the Mertzes to see him for the first time.
2.22	"No Children Allowed"	Richard and Ronald Lee Simmons	When Little Ricky cries throughout the night, neighbors complain and the clause in their lease "No Children Allowed" comes into play.
2.24	"The Indian Show"	Richard and Ronald Lee Simmons	Lucy appears as a dancer in Ricky's "Waters of the Minnetonka" number with Little Ricky strapped on her back.
3.2	"The Girls Go Into Business"		With dreams of making a fortune, Lucy and Ethel buy their own dress shop.
3.5	"Baby Pictures"	Joseph and Michael Mayer	Lucy and Ricky promise not to show off pictures of Little Ricky like other parents do.
3.9	"Too Many Crooks"	Joseph and Michael Mayer	Lucy escapes with Little Ricky when she believes a crook named Madame X is outside on her fire escape.
3.14	"Ricky Minds the Baby"	Joseph and Michael Mayer	Little Ricky spends quality time with his father when Ricky has a week off work.
3.20	"Home Movies"	Joseph and Michael Mayer	Ricky makes home movies about Little Ricky with his new movie camera and projector.
4.21	"The Hedda Hopper Story"	Joseph and Michael Mayer	Mrs. MacGillicuddy and Little Ricky arrive in California to join the Ricardos and the Mertzes.
5.2	"Lucy and John Wayne"	Joseph and Michael Mayer	After John Wayne signs his name in cement for the second time, Little Ricky is seen playing in the wet cement.
5.5	"The Great Train Robbery"	Joseph and Michael Mayer	When Mrs. MacGillicuddy and Little Ricky get moved to a different room on the train ride back to New York from California, Lucy first thinks they've been kidnapped.
5.6	"Homecoming"	Joseph and Michael Mayer	The Ricardos, Mertzes and Little Ricky arrive back in New York.
5.9	"Nursery School"	Joseph and Michael Mayer	Little Ricky gets sick after Ricky insists that Lucy enroll him in nursery school.
5.13	"Bon Voyage"	Joseph and Michael Mayer	Lucy misses the ship to Europe when she gets off to kiss Little Ricky goodbye one more time.
5.22	"Lucy Gets Homesick in Italy"	Joseph and Michael Mayer	Lucy gets homesick on Little Ricky's birthday.
6.2	"Little Ricky Learns to Play the Drums"	Richard Keith	Little Ricky's incessant playing causes trouble between the Ricardos and the Mertzes.
6.4	"Little Ricky gets Stage Fright"	Richard Keith	Little Ricky panics before his first music school recital.
6.7	"Deep Sea Fishing"	Richard Keith	The group goes fishing and there's a bet between the men, including Little Ricky, and the women about who can catch the bigger fish.
6.8	"Desert Island"	Richard Keith	The group, including Little Ricky, get stranded at sea when Lucy gets only half a tank of gas for the boat.
6.9	"The Ricardos Visit Cuba"	Richard Keith	Little Ricky plays the Conga drums alongside his father in a night club performance in Cuba.
6.10	"Little Ricky's School Pageant"	Richard Keith	Little Ricky lands the lead in his school play, "The Enchanted Forest."
6.13	"Lucy and Superman"	Richard Keith	Lucy gets Superman, guest star George Reeves, to appear at Little Ricky's fifth birthday party.
6.14	"Little Ricky gets a Dog"	Richard Keith	Little Ricky's new dog causes problems with the new neighbor.
6.16	"Lucy Hates to Leave"	Richard Keith	The Ricardos, including Little Ricky, make their move from New York City to the country in Connecticut.
6.19	"Lucy Raises Chickens"	Richard Keith	Little Ricky accidentally lets five hundred baby chicks escape and the house is soon overrun.
6.20	"Lucy Does the Tango"	Richard Keith	Little Ricky and his friend, Bruce Ramsey, hide 250 chickens when his father decides that he's going to sell them.
6.21	"Ragtime Band"	Richard Keith	When Ricky refuses to play for a local benefit, Lucy forms a band which includes Little Ricky.
6.24	"Building a BBQ"	Richard Keith	When Little Ricky's kite flies away, there's a chance Lucy's wedding ring went with it.
6.26	"Lucy Raises Tulips"	Richard Keith	Little Ricky's dog, Fred, causes problems for Lucy who's growing tulips for a neighborhood contest.
6.27	"The Ricardos Dedicate a Statue"	Richard Keith	When Little Ricky's dog, Fred, runs away, it causes problems for the entire neighborhood and especially the Westport Historical Society.
