= Lucy Goes to the Hospital =

- I Love Lucy episode
- Episode no.: Season 2 Episode 16
- Directed by: William Asher
- Written by: Jess Oppenheimer; Madelyn Davis; Bob Carroll, Jr.
- Cinematography by: Karl Freund
- Original air date: January 19, 1953
- Running time: 30 minutes

Guest appearances
- Charles Lane as Mr. Stanley; Peggy Rea as Wheelchair Nurse; Adele Longmire as Desk Nurse; Barbara Pepper as Nursery Nurse; Hazel Pierce as Nursery Nurse; Ruth Perrott as Nurse; Bennett Green as Orderly; Ralph Montgomery as Policeman; William Hamel as Maitre D'; James John Ganzer as Baby

Episode chronology
← Previous "Lucy Becomes a Sculptress"	Next → "Sales Resistance"

"Lucy Goes to the Hospital" is an episode of the 1950s American television show I Love Lucy in which the title character, Lucy Ricardo, gives birth to a baby boy after a chaotic sequence of events. Twelve hours before the original broadcast on January 19, 1953, the actress who played Lucy, Lucille Ball, had given birth to Desi Arnaz Jr. by cesarean section. (Note: This was not a coincidence. According to Desi Arnaz, Ball's Caesarean section was scheduled in advance for the same day the episode was scheduled to air.) The episode was previously filmed on November 14, 1952.

== Impact and legacy ==
The episode was the culmination of an unprecedented pairing of the fictional pregnancy of Lucy with the real-life pregnancy of Ball; "real-time pregnancy was fictively narrated for the first time on American television." (Note: This may not entirely be true, since Mary Kay and Johnny is also reputed to have written the pregnancy of its star Mary Kay Stearns into the script; that more obscure series has since been mostly destroyed, making it difficult to verify.)

When the episode premiered on January 19, 1953, 73.9% of all American homes with television sets tuned in, amounting to 44 million viewers watching the episode, a record until September 9, 1956, when Elvis Presley appeared for the first time on The Ed Sullivan Show, at CBS, which drew a share of 82.6%, a figure unrivaled since. It received higher ratings than the inauguration of President Dwight D. Eisenhower, which received 29 million viewers, the day afterward. Desi Arnaz said, "We had a rabbi, a priest and a Protestant minister on the set to approve those sequences."

The cover story of Newsweek on January 19, 1953, was about the episode (which had not yet been aired when the issue went to press). The first issue of TV Guide, dated April 3, 1953, featured a cover photo of newborn Desi Arnaz Jr., captioned as "Lucy's $50,000,000 Baby".

Numerous stories were published about the sex of the baby, which was kept secret until the episode aired; when Ball actually had a boy as Lucy did in the script, headlines proclaimed "Lucy sticks to script: a boy it is!" (New York Daily Mirror), "TV was right: a boy for Lucille" (New York Daily News), and "What the Script Ordered" (Life magazine).

== See also ==
- Pregnancy in I Love Lucy
- List of I Love Lucy episodes
