= LucyPhone =

Defunct American call-back and virtual queueing service

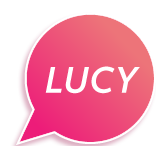
- Website type: Call-back service; virtual queueing
- Available in: English
- Headquarters: Richmond, Virginia, U.S.
- Owner: Decogram Corp. / CallPromise LLC
- Creators: Mike Oristian; Tom Oristian
- Commercial: Yes
- Launched: March 2010; 16 years ago
- Current status: Defunct

LucyPhone was a free service that allowed consumers to avoid the wait time that occurs when call center operators place them on hold.

Established in March 2010 by brothers Mike and Tom Oristian, LucyPhone was used 70,000 to 80,000 times per month by August 2010. The service's name was inspired by the phone popularized by the television show I Love Lucy. The service is no longer available.

== History ==
LucyPhone was founded in March 2010 by brothers Mike and Tom Oristian, Stanford University graduates who live in Richmond, Virginia. The service was inspired by the frustration they experienced as consumers who had to wait lengthy periods of time when call center operators place them on hold. The Oristians began developing LucyPhone in mid-2009; they funded the project through their web consulting company Decogram Corp.

Tom Oristian wanted to name his firstborn Lucy, but his first child received a different name. He said in an interview that "[t]he next baby that came along was this project", so the company was named LucyPhone. According to WHEC-TV, the founders named the company after the phone universalized in the television show I Love Lucy. PC World said the site's name is from the acronym "Let Us Call You".

The brothers used Twitter and hired a New York publicist to promote their service. LucyPhone does a real-time search on Tweets that contain phrases such as "on hold with", and then, through its Twitter account, automatically follows those Twitter users. People followed by LucyPhone frequently view LucyPhone's profile because they are curious about having a new follower. For example, on March 14, 2010, New Yorker Dave Cirilli sent a Tweet that stated "Aaaaand that would be THREE HOURS on hold with 1-800-JETBLUE! Okay, @JetBlue, you beat me! You wore me down! I give. Goodnight." When Cirilli discovered that LucyPhone was following him, he tried the service. Cirilli contacted the company later and became its publicist.

The Oristians further devised an iPhone app that was downloaded 60,000 times in July 2010. By August 2010, use of the site expanded to 70,000 to 80,000 times per month. In August 2010, Mike and Tom Oristian were the company's only employees.

The founders initially planned to offer the service for payment but later decided to offer it for free. Co-founder Tom Oristian stated in an interview that they "quickly learned" that a subscription business model was not the correct business model. The company hoped to make a profit in the future by having companies pay to place a LucyPhone widget on their websites.

The app was a product of CallPromise LLC, which the Oristians founded. CallPromise created a "virtual queueing" product hosted in the cloud that would serve businesses who could allow clients to call them, hang up, and wait for a customer support representative team member to respond. The service was used by Intuit and MetLife. In 2015, Virtual Hold Technology (VHT), a company based in Akron, Ohio, purchased a minority interest position in CallPromise. In 2016, VHT purchased the rest of CallPromise.

== Service ==
Users can key in customer service numbers to LucyPhone or search for the phone numbers of the companies they wish to contact. When a user is placed on hold, he or she can press two asterisks, "**", and his or her phone is disconnected while LucyPhone remains connected to customer service. When a customer service representative answers the phone call, LucyPhone calls the user back.

In order for LucyPhone to function successfully, it needs the assistance of customer service agents. The reason is that when the agents answer a call, LucyPhone's recorded message asks them to press 1 to receive a call from the anticipating customers. The call center agents sometimes hang up on LucyPhone's request because they are used to interacting solely with humans. The company reported that fewer than 10% of the calls are terminated by customer service agents. Government agencies such as the IRS, are instructed not to accept Lucyphone calls.

LucyPhone was supported on desktop and on mobile platforms including iOS and Android. Lifehacker wrote that "it'd be nice if LucyPhone implemented the same kind of skip-ahead-in-the-tree service of apps like Fonolo or Dial Zero".
