= I Love Lucy =

American sitcom (1951–1957)

- Logo from the syndicated edition
- Genre: Sitcom
- Based on: My Favorite Husband
- Starring: Lucille Ball; Desi Arnaz; Vivian Vance; William Frawley; Richard Keith
- Theme music composer: Eliot Daniel (music); Harold Adamson (lyrics)
- Composers: Eliot Daniel; Wilbur Hatch; Marco Rizo
- Country of origin: United States
- Original languages: English; Spanish
- No. of seasons: 6
- No. of episodes: 180 (Note: This total includes the "lost" Christmas episode but not the original pilot.) (list of episodes)

Production
- Executive producer: Desi Arnaz (#29–153)
- Producers: Jess Oppenheimer (#1–153); Desi Arnaz (#154-179)
- Production locations: Desilu Studios, Los Angeles
- Camera setup: Multi-camera
- Running time: 23–26 minutes
- Production company: Desilu Productions

Original release
- Network: CBS
- Release: October 15, 1951 – May 6, 1957

Related
- The Lucy–Desi Comedy Hour

I Love Lucy is an American sitcom that aired on CBS from October 15, 1951, to May 6, 1957, with 180 half-hour episodes across six seasons. The series starred Lucille Ball and her husband Desi Arnaz, along with Vivian Vance and William Frawley, and follows the life of Lucy Ricardo (Ball), a young, middle-class housewife living in New York City, who often concocts plans with her best friends and landlords, Ethel and Fred Mertz (Vance and Frawley), to appear alongside her bandleader husband, Ricky Ricardo (Arnaz), in his nightclub. Lucy is depicted trying numerous schemes to mingle with and be a part of show business. After the series ended in 1957, a modified version of the show continued for three more seasons, with 13 one-hour specials, which ran from 1957 to 1960. It was first known as The Lucille Ball–Desi Arnaz Show, and later, in reruns, as The Lucy–Desi Comedy Hour.

I Love Lucy became the most-watched show in the United States in four of its six seasons and it was the first to end its run at the top of the Nielsen ratings. As of 2011, episodes of the show have been syndicated in dozens of languages across the world and remains popular with an American audience of 40 million each year. A colorized version of its Christmas episode attracted more than eight million viewers when CBS aired it in prime time in 2013, 62 years after the show premiered.

The show – which was the first scripted television program to be filmed on 35 mm film in front of a studio audience, by cinematographer Karl Freund – won five Emmy Awards and received many nominations and honors. It was the first show to feature an ensemble cast. As such, it is often regarded as one of the most influential television programs in history. In 2012, it was voted the 'Best TV Show of All Time' in a survey conducted by ABC News and People magazine. In 2013, the Writers Guild of America ranked it #12 on their list of the 101 Best Written TV Series.

== Premise ==
Originally set in an apartment building in New York City, I Love Lucy centers on Lucy Ricardo (Lucille Ball) and her singer/bandleader husband, Ricky Ricardo (Desi Arnaz), along with their best friends and landlords, Fred Mertz (William Frawley) and Ethel Mertz (Vivian Vance). During the second season, Lucy and Ricky have a son named Ricky Ricardo Jr., who usually goes by "Little Ricky" and is portrayed by multiple actors throughout the seasons. His birth was timed to coincide with the real-life birth of Ball's son, Desi Arnaz Jr.

Lucy is naïve and ambitious, with a hunger for stardom and a knack for getting both herself and her husband into trouble whenever she yearns to make it big in show business. The Ricardos' best friends, Fred and Ethel, are former vaudevillians. The Mertzes' history in entertainment only strengthens Lucy's resolve to prove herself as a performer, though she often feels excluded, as her industry involvement is limited relative to that of Ricky, Fred, and Ethel. Though charismatic, throughout the series, she is depicted as having few marketable performance skills, and she is often portrayed as being tone deaf, struggling to perform anything other than off-key renditions of songs such as "Glow Worm" on the saxophone, and many of her performances end in disaster. However, to say she is completely without talent would be untrue, as on occasion, she is shown to be a good dancer and a competent singer. She is also at least twice offered contracts by television or film companies – first in the season 1 episode "The Audition", when she replaces an injured clown in Ricky's act at the Tropicana nightclub, and later in the season 5 episode "Lucy and the Dummy", when she dances in Hollywood for a studio party using a rubber Ricky dummy as her dancing partner.

Little information was offered about Lucy's past. A few episodes mentioned that she was born in Jamestown, New York (Ball's real-life home town), later specified to be West Jamestown, that she graduated from Jamestown High School, that her maiden name was "McGillicuddy" (indicating a Scottish or Irish ethnicity, at least on her father's side, though she once mentioned her grandmother was Swedish), and that she met Ricky on a cruise with her friend from an agency she once worked for. Her family was absent, other than occasional appearances by her scatter-brained mother Mrs. McGillicuddy (Kathryn Card), who could never get Ricky's name right. Lucy was also secretive about her age and true hair color, and tended to be careless with money, in addition to being somewhat materialistic, insisting on buying new dresses and hats for every occasion and telling old friends that she and Ricky were wealthy. She was also depicted as a devoted housewife, adept cook, and attentive mother. As part of Lucy's role was to care for her husband, she stayed at home and took care of the household chores, while her husband Ricky went to work. During the post-war era, Lucy took jobs outside of the home, but in these jobs the show portrayed her as being inept outside of her usual domestic duties.

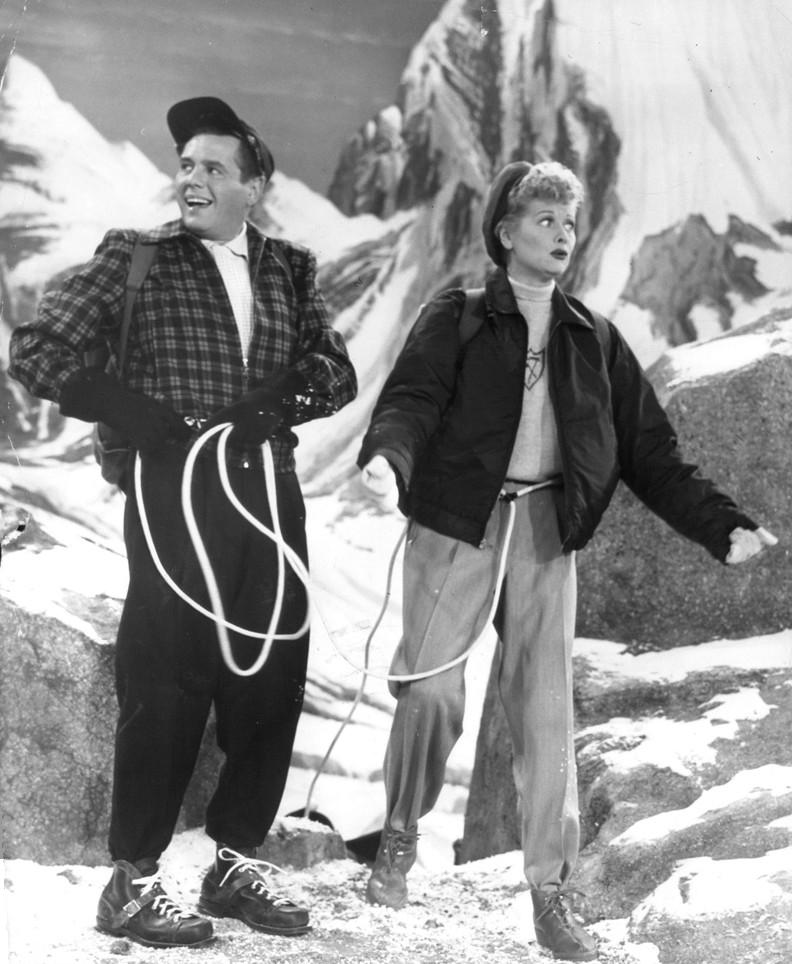
Lucy and Ricky climb in the Alps during their 1956 trip to Europe.

Lucy's husband, Ricky Ricardo, is an up-and-coming Cuban American singer and bandleader with an excitable personality. His patience is frequently tested by his wife's antics trying to get into showbiz, along with her exorbitant spending on clothes and furniture. When exasperated, he often reverts to speaking rapidly in Spanish. As with Lucy, not much is revealed about his past or family. Ricky's mother (played by actress Mary Emery) appears in two episodes; in another, Lucy mentions that he has five brothers. Ricky also mentions that he had been "practically raised" by his Uncle Alberto (who was seen during a family visit to Cuba), and that he had attended the University of Havana. A catchphrase strongly associated with Ricky is "Lucy, you got some 'splaining to do" (sometimes "Lucy, you got a lotta splainin to do"), whenever something Lucy had kept a secret from Ricky that turned into a complicated, problematic situation and was finally revealed to him. The line is still often mentioned in articles about I Love Lucy and printed on official merchandise, although Ricky never says this phrase in any episode.

An extended flashback segment in the 1957 episode "Lucy Takes a Cruise to Havana" of The Lucille Ball–Desi Arnaz Show filled in numerous details of how Lucy and Ricky met and how Ricky came to the United States. The story, at least insofar as related to newspaper columnist Hedda Hopper, is that the couple met in Havana when Lucy and the Mertzes vacationed there in 1940. Despite his being a university graduate and proficient in English, Ricky is portrayed as a driver of a horse-drawn cab who waits for fares at a pier where tourists arrive by ship. Ricky is hired to serve as one of Lucy's tour guides, and the two fall in love. Having coincidentally also met popular singer Rudy Vallée on the cruise ship, Lucy arranges an audition for Ricky, who is hired to be in Vallée's orchestra, thus allowing him to emigrate to the United States on the very ship on which Lucy and the Mertzes were returning. Lucy later states that Ricky played for Vallée only one night before being traded to Xavier Cugat's orchestra.

The extended flashback segment "Lucy Takes a Cruise to Havana" and the story of how Lucy and Ricky met is inconsistent with the season 4 episode "Don Juan and the Starlets". At one point in that episode, Lucy, after finding out that she was not invited to join Ricky at a movie premiere, bemoans that she made a mistake fifteen years before when her friend Marion Strong asked her if she would like to go on a blind date with a Cuban drummer, to which she said "yes."

Throughout the series, Lucy is usually found with her best friend, Ethel. A former singer and actress in Albuquerque, New Mexico, Ethel tries to relive her glory days in vaudeville. Ricky is more inclined to include Ethel in performances at his nightclub because, unlike Lucy, she can sing and dance rather well.

The show mentions that Ethel's husband, Fred, served in World War I, and lived through the Great Depression. As such, in the series, Fred is depicted as being very stingy with money and as being an irascible, no-nonsense type. However, he also reveals that he can be a soft touch, especially when it comes to Little Ricky, to whom Fred is both godfather and honorary "uncle". Fred can also sing and dance, and he often performs duets with Ethel.

The Manhattan building they all lived in before their move to Westport, Connecticut during the sixth season was addressed at a fictional 623 East 68th Street, at first in apartment 4A, then moving to the larger apartment 3B (subsequently re-designated 3D; the Mertzes' apartment is then numbered 3B), on the Upper East Side of Manhattan. In actuality, however, the addresses go up only to the 500s before the street terminates at the East River.

== Cast ==
=== Main cast ===
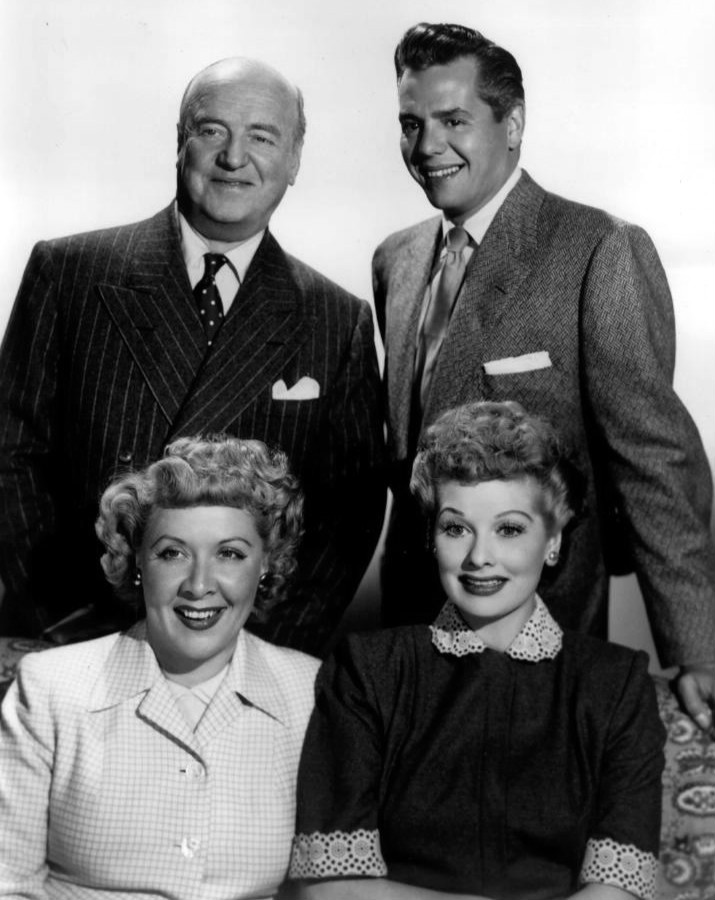
Cast members from left, standing: William Frawley, Desi Arnaz, seated: Vivian Vance and Lucille Ball

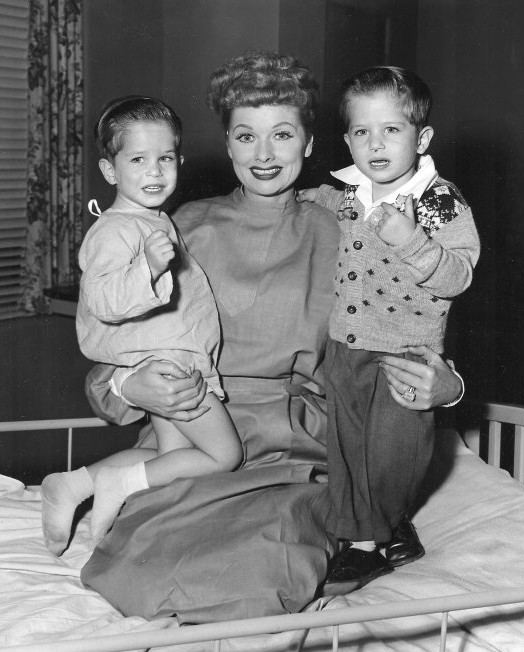
Mike (left) and Joe Mayer played Little Ricky as a toddler.

- Lucille Ball as Lucy McGillicuddy Ricardo
- Desi Arnaz as Ricky Ricardo
- Vivian Vance as Ethel Mertz
- William Frawley as Fred Mertz
- Richard Keith as "Little" Ricky Ricardo
  - Twins Mike Mayer and Joe Mayer played Little Ricky as a toddler

=== Supporting cast ===
- Jerry Hausner as Jerry, Ricky's agent. The character was played by Paul Dubov in the second season episode "The Handcuffs".
- Frank Nelson as Freddy Fillmore, a quiz show host.
- Elizabeth Patterson as Mrs. Matilda Trumbull, a neighbor in the same building as the Ricardos who occasionally babysat Little Ricky.
- William Hamel as the Tropicana nightclub's Maitre D'.
- Margie Liszt and Shirley Mitchell as Marion Strong, an acquaintance of Lucy and Ethel who wore outlandish hats. Liszt portrayed the character in her first appearance, "The Club Election", and Mitchell took over the role thereafter.
- Doris Singleton as Caroline Appleby, a friend of Lucy and Ethel's who usually tried to one-up them. Her husband Charlie (Hy Averback/George O'Hanlon) and son Stevie (Steven Kay) also made appearances. The character was named Lillian in her first appearance in the second season episode "The Club Election".
- Tennessee Ernie Ford as Cousin Ernie, a country cousin of Lucy's.
- Ross Elliott as Ross, Ricky's publicity man in season four.
- Bob Jellison as Bobby the Bellboy, a Hollywood bellhop in season four.
- Kathryn Card as Mrs. McGillicuddy, Lucy's mother.
- Mary Jane Croft as Betty Ramsey, the Ricardos' new neighbor in Connecticut and a childhood friend of Ethel.
- Ray Ferrell as Bruce Ramsey, Betty's son.

Hausner, Patterson, Card, Croft, Jellison and Elliott all appeared in single-episode roles before they appeared as their recurring characters. Nelson appeared as 10 characters across the show's six seasons, including his recurring character Freddy Fillmore and two appearances as character Ralph Ramsey.

Gale Gordon and Bea Benaderet, supporting cast members on My Favorite Husband, were originally approached for the roles of Fred and Ethel, but neither could accept, owing to previous commitments. Gordon did appear in the season one episodes "Lucy's Schedule" and "Ricky Asks for a Raise" as Mr. Littlefield, and later as a civil court judge in an episode of The Lucille Ball–Desi Arnaz Show. He would go on to co-star with Ball in all of her post–I Love Lucy series (The Lucy Show, Here's Lucy and Life with Lucy). Benaderet was a guest star in the season one episode "Lucy Plays Cupid" as Miss Lewis, a neighbor of the Ricardos. Barbara Pepper was also considered to play Ethel, but Pepper had been drinking very heavily after the death of her husband Craig W. Reynolds. She did, however, turn up in at least nine episodes of I Love Lucy in bit parts.

Many of the characters in the series were named after Ball's family members or close friends. For example, Marion Strong was one of her best friends and a roommate for a time in New York, and she also set Ball and Arnaz up on their first date. Lillian Appleby was a teacher of Ball's when she was in an amateur production on the stage. Additionally, Pauline Lopus was a childhood friend, while Fred was the name of both Ball's brother and her grandfather. Ball and Arnaz had a business manager by the name of Mr. Andrew Hickox, and in the first episode of season four, "The Business Manager", Ricky hires a man named Mr. Hickox.

=== Primary production team ===
- Directors: Marc Daniels (33 episodes, 1951–53); William Asher (101 episodes, 1952–57); James V. Kern (39 episodes, 1955–57)
- Producers: Jess Oppenheimer (153 episodes, 1951–56); Desi Arnaz (exec. producer – 124 episodes, 1952–56; producer – 26 episodes, 1956–57)
- Writers: Jess Oppenheimer (head writer, seasons 1–5), Madelyn Pugh Davis and Bob Carroll Jr. (All seasons including Lucy–Desi Comedy Hour), Bob Schiller and Bob Weiskopf (seasons 5–6 and Lucy–Desi Comedy Hour)
- Original Music: Wilbur Hatch (33 episodes, 1951–54); Eliot Daniel (135 episodes, 1952–57); Marco Rizo (1951–1957)
- Cinematography: Karl Freund (149 episodes, 1951–56)
- Costume design: Elois Jenssen (57 episodes, 1953–55), Edward Stevenson (66 episodes, 1955–60)
- Film Editors: Dann Cahn, Bud Molin

== Background and development ==
=== Background ===
Lucille Ball came to Hollywood after a successful stint as a New York model. She was chosen by Samuel Goldwyn to be one of 16 Goldwyn Girls to co-star in the picture Roman Scandals (1933), with film star Eddie Cantor. Enthusiastic and hard-working, Ball had been able to secure film work briefly at the Samuel Goldwyn Studio and Columbia Pictures and then eventually at RKO Radio Pictures. It was at RKO that Ball received steady film work, first as an extra and bit player and eventually working her way up to co-starring roles in feature films and starring roles in second-rate B pictures, collectively earning her the nickname "Queen of the B's". During her run at RKO, Ball gained the reputation for doing physical comedy and stunts that most other actresses avoided, keeping her steadily employed. In 1940, Ball met Desi Arnaz, a Cuban bandleader who had just come off a successful run in the 1939–40 Broadway show Too Many Girls. RKO, after purchasing film rights to the show, cast Ball as Arnaz's love interest in the picture. The duo began a whirlwind courtship, leading to their elopement in Connecticut in November 1940. Despite their marriage, however, their careers kept them separated, with Ball's film work keeping her anchored in Hollywood, while Arnaz's nightclub engagements with his orchestra kept him on the road.

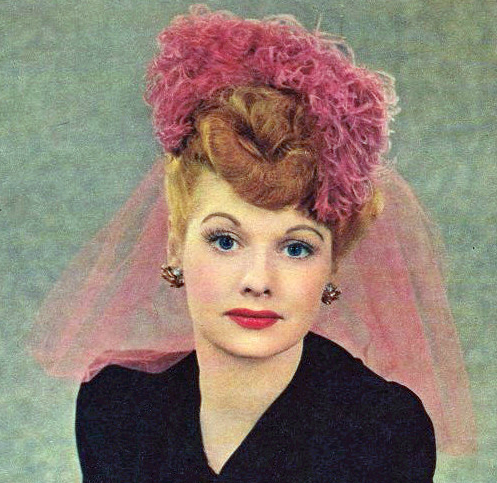
Lucille Ball in 1944

Despite steadily working in pictures, Ball's movie career never advanced to the level of a headlining feature-film actress. Nevertheless, she remained popular with film audiences. Ball came to the attention of Metro-Goldwyn-Mayer after receiving critical acclaim for her starring role in the 1942 Damon Runyon film The Big Street, which bought out her contract. It was under contract with MGM, however, that Ball, who had previously been a blonde, dyed her hair red to complement the Technicolor features that MGM planned to use her in. MGM cast Ball in a variety of films, but it was her work with fellow comedian Red Skelton in the 1943 film DuBarry Was a Lady that brought Ball's physical comedy to the forefront, earning her the reputation as "that crazy redhead", which Ricky would later call her on the show. Nonetheless, Ball's striking beauty was in sharp contrast to the physical antics she performed in her films. Throughout her career, MGM tried to utilize her in multiple different film genres that did little to highlight her skills. Given their difficulties in casting her, MGM chose not to renew her contract when it expired in 1946.

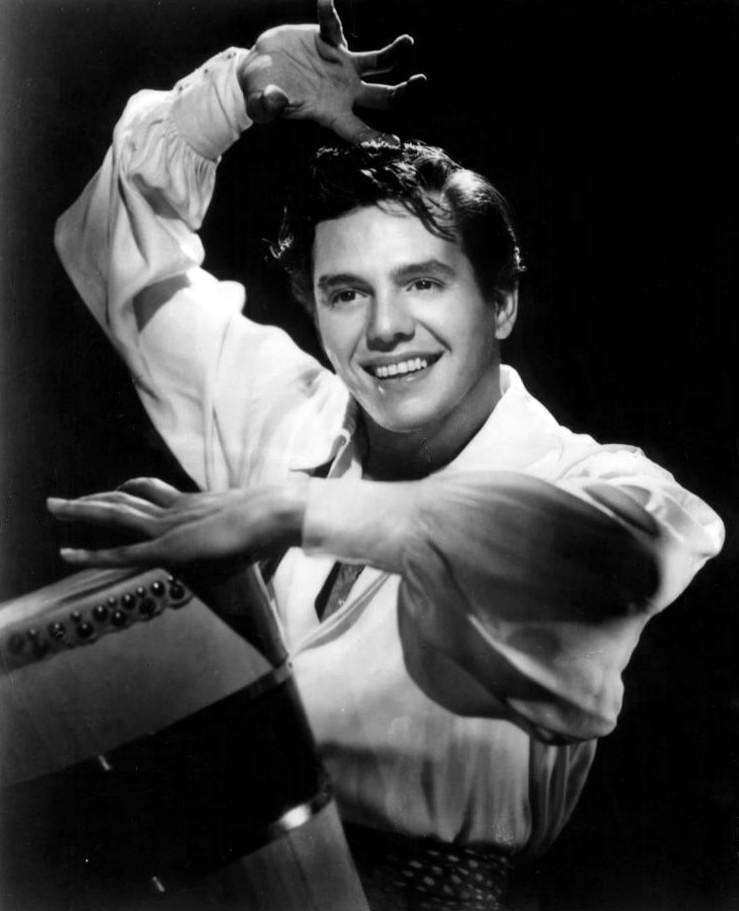
Desi Arnaz

Ball began working as a freelance artist in films and also began to explore other venues. Before and during World War II, Ball made several notable and successful guest appearances on several radio programs, including both Jack Haley's radio show and bandleader Kay Kyser's radio program. These appearances brought Ball to the attention of CBS, which, in 1948, enlisted her to star in one of two new half-hour situation comedies in development, Our Miss Brooks and My Favorite Husband. Choosing the latter, Ball portrayed Liz Cugat (later anglicized to Cooper), the frustrated and scheming housewife of a Minneapolis banker, played originally by actor Lee Bowman in the series pilot, and later by Richard Denning. Based on the novel Mr. and Mrs. Cugat, by Isabel Scott Rorick, My Favorite Husband was produced by Jess Oppenheimer and written by Oppenheimer, Madelyn Pugh, and Bob Carroll Jr. Premiering on July 23, 1948, and sponsored by General Foods, Husband became a hit for CBS. During the run of the radio program, Ball also appeared in two feature films with Bob Hope, Sorrowful Jones in 1949, and Fancy Pants in 1950. Both films were box office and critical successes, further cementing Ball's reputation as a top-notch, first-rate comedian. They also highlighted her growing popularity with audiences, enticing CBS to further use her skills.

In 1950, CBS asked Ball to take My Favorite Husband to television with co-star Richard Denning. Ball saw a television show as a great opportunity to work with Arnaz, however, and she insisted that he play her husband, much to the dismay of CBS, which was reluctant to cast Arnaz in that role, as he was Cuban. CBS executives did not think audiences would buy into a marriage between an all-American girl and a Latin man. To prove CBS wrong, the couple developed a vaudeville act, written by Carroll and Pugh, that they performed at Newburgh, NY's historic Ritz Theater with Arnaz's orchestra. The act was a hit and convinced CBS executive Harry Ackerman that a Ball–Arnaz pairing would be a worthwhile venture. At the same time, rival networks NBC, ABC, and DuMont were showing interest in a Ball–Arnaz series, which Ackerman used to convince CBS to sign the duo.

A pilot was ordered and kinescoped in Hollywood in March 1951, which coincided with Ball's first pregnancy, and the ending of Husband, which aired its last radio show on March 31, 1951. Ball and Arnaz used the same radio team of Oppenheimer, Pugh, and Carroll to create the television series that was named I Love Lucy. The couple's agent, Don Sharpe, brought the pilot to several advertising agencies with little luck, but finally succeeded with Milton H. Biow's agency, The Biow Company, which convinced its client, cigarette giant Philip Morris, to sponsor the show.

Every episode of I Love Lucy would be filmed in front of a studio audience consisting of 300 members, with Desi Arnaz acting as emcee before every episode filming. One notable filming, which occurred when Ball was being investigated for potential Communist sympathies in 1953, involved Arnaz telling the audience "Now I want you to meet my favorite wife, my favorite redhead. In fact, that's the only thing red about her. And even that's not legitimate, Lucille Ball."

=== Production ===
During the spring and summer of 1951, I Love Lucy moved into production. Oppenheimer, Pugh, and Carroll began fine-tuning the premise of the show and writing the series' first scripts. The trio chose to adapt many storylines for television using the backlog of episodes of My Favorite Husband. In addition, the series' ensemble cast and crew were assembled. Arnaz retained his orchestra, which was used in the series' musical numbers and to score the show's background and transitional music. Arnaz's childhood friend Marco Rizo arranged the music and played the piano for the show, while Wilbur Hatch conducted the orchestra.

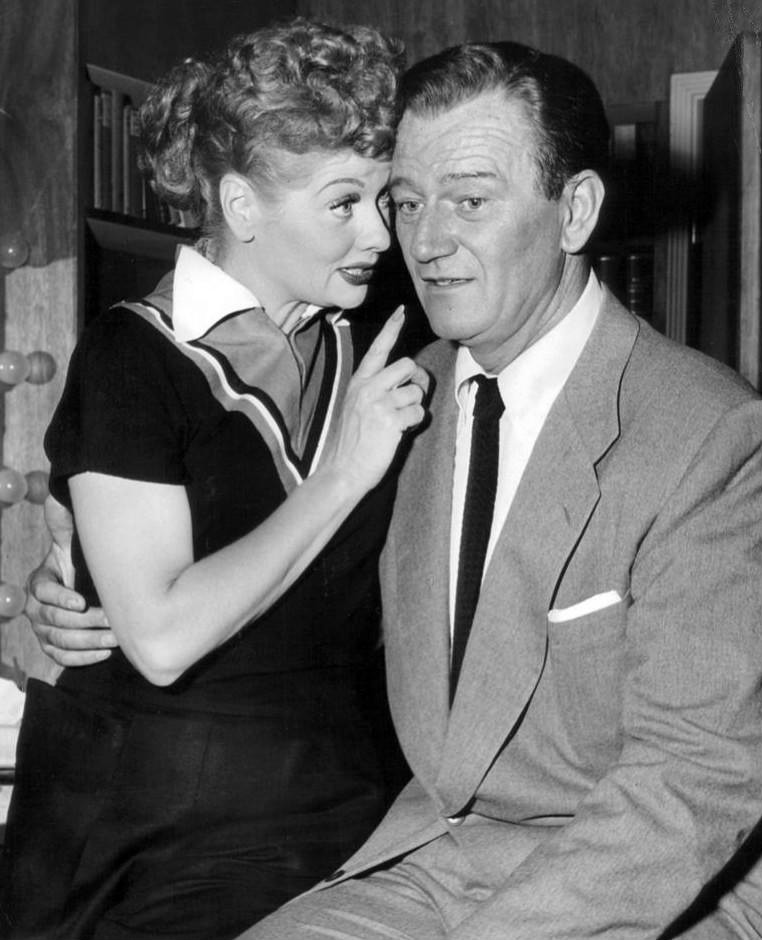
Lucille Ball with John Wayne on the set of the 1955 episode "Lucy and John Wayne"

After Philip Morris signed on to sponsor the show, two problems that would ultimately change the fate of I Love Lucy arose. Ball and Arnaz had originally decided that the series would air biweekly, like The George Burns and Gracie Allen Show. Philip Morris, however, was insistent that the show air weekly, thus diminishing the possibility of Ball continuing her film career alongside a television show. Another problem lay in the fact that Philip Morris wanted the series to originate from New York rather than Hollywood. At the time, most television shows were produced from New York and broadcast live for eastern and Midwest audiences. West Coast viewers were able to view live programs only through low-quality kinescopes, which derived their images by using a 35 mm or 16 mm film camera to record the show from a television monitor.

Although the pilot film shown to Philip Morris had been a kinescope, the sponsor did not want the lucrative East Coast market, accustomed to quality broadcasts, to see a low-quality kinescope film. Owing to the impending birth of their first child, both Ball and Arnaz insisted on staying in Hollywood and producing the show on film, something a few Hollywood-based series had begun to do. Both CBS and Philip Morris initially balked at the idea, because of the higher cost that filming the show would incur, and acquiesced only after the couple offered to take a $1,000-a-week pay cut in order to cover the additional expense. In exchange, Ball and Arnaz demanded, and were given, 80% ownership in the I Love Lucy films (the other 20% went to Oppenheimer, who then gave 5% to Pugh and 5% to Carroll). Shooting the show on film, however, would require that Ball and Arnaz become responsible for producing the series themselves. Union agreements at the time stipulated that any production filmed in a studio use film studio employees. CBS staff were television and radio employees and thus fell under different union agreements. Thus, Arnaz reorganized the company he created to manage his orchestra bookings and used it as the corporation that would produce the I Love Lucy shows. The company was named Desilu, from the combination of both of their first names, Desi and Lucille.

Though some television series were already being filmed in Hollywood, most used the single-camera format familiar from movies, with a laugh track added to comedies to simulate audience response. Ball wanted to work in front of a live audience to create the kind of comic energy she had displayed on radio. The idea of a film studio that could accommodate an audience was a new one for the time, as fire safety regulations made it difficult to allow an audience in a studio. Arnaz and Oppenheimer found the financially struggling General Service Studios located on Las Palmas Avenue in Hollywood. Studio owner Jimmy Nasser was eager to accommodate the Desilu company and allowed them, with the financial backing of CBS, to renovate two of his studios so that they could accommodate an audience and be in compliance with local fire laws.

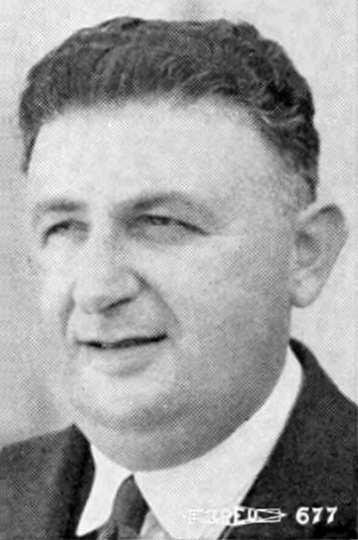
Cinematographer Karl Freund (1932)

Another component to filming the show came when it was decided to use three 35 mm film cameras to simultaneously film the show. The idea had been pioneered by Jerry Fairbanks, and it had been used on the live anthology series The Silver Theater and the game show Truth or Consequences. Ralph Edwards's assistant Al Simon was hired by Desilu to help perfect the new technique for the series. The process lent itself to the Lucy production as it eliminated the problem of requiring an audience to view and react to a scene three or four times in order for all necessary shots to be filmed. Multiple cameras would also allow scenes to be performed in sequence, as a play would be, which was unusual at the time for filmed series. Retakes were rare and dialogue mistakes were often left in the episodes.

Ball and Arnaz enlisted the services of Karl Freund, a cinematographer who had worked on such films as Metropolis (1927), Dracula (1931), The Good Earth (1937), and DuBarry Was a Lady (1943) (which also starred Ball), as well as directed The Mummy (1932), to be the series cinematographer. Although at first Freund did not want anything to do with television, it was the personal plea of the couple that convinced him to take the job.

Freund was instrumental in developing a way to uniformly light the set so that each of the three cameras would pick up the same quality of image. Freund noted that a typical episode (20–22 min.) was shot in about 60 minutes, with one constant concern being the shades-of-gray contrast in the final print, as each stage of transmission and broadcast would exaggerate the contrast. Freund also pioneered flat lighting, in which everything is brightly lit to eliminate shadows and the need for endless relighting. This mindfulness of contrasts led to sets and props being prepared in monochrome shades: "This knowledge of the contrast secret is revealed in the decor of the sets. They are painted in various shades of grey. Props likewise follow the ethical demands of correct contrast, as do the wardrobes of the players. Even newspapers, when they are to appear in a scene, are tinted grey."

Audience reactions were live, which created a more authentic laugh than the canned laughter used on most filmed sitcoms of the time. Regular audience members were sometimes heard from episode to episode, and Arnaz's distinctive laugh could be heard in the background during scenes in which he did not perform, as well as Ball's mother, DeDe, whose distinctive "uh oh" could be heard in many of the episodes. In later years, CBS would devise a laugh track from several I Love Lucy audiences and use them for canned laughter on shows done without a live audience.

I Love Lucy's pioneering use of three cameras led to it becoming the standard technique for the production of most sitcoms filmed in front of an audience. Single-camera setups remained the technique of choice for sitcoms that did not use audiences. This led to an unexpected benefit for Desilu during the series' second season when it was discovered that Ball was pregnant. Not being able to fulfill the show's 39-episode commitment, both Desi and Oppenheimer decided to rebroadcast popular episodes of the series' first season to help give Ball the necessary rest she needed after she gave birth, effectively allowing fewer episodes to be filmed that season. Unexpectedly, the rebroadcasts proved to be ratings winners, effectively giving birth to the rerun, which would later lead to the profitable development of the rerun syndication market.

The show's original opening and commercial bumpers were animated caricatures of Ball and Arnaz. They were designed and animated by MGM character designer, and future "Flintstones" cartoonist, Gene Hazelton (1917–2005) and were produced under a contract that producer William Hanna had secured privately. The program sponsor, Philip Morris cigarettes, was incorporated into many of these sequences, so when I Love Lucy went into repeats, the sponsor material was replaced by the now-familiar heart logo. However, Hazelton's original animation survives and can be seen in the DVD boxed set as originally presented.

Desilu Productions, jointly owned by Ball and Arnaz, would gradually expand to produce and lease studio space for many other shows. For seasons 1 and 2 (1951–1953), Desilu rented space and filmed I Love Lucy at General Service Studios, which eventually became known as Hollywood Center Studios. In 1953, it leased the Motion Picture Center at 846 Cahuenga Blvd. in Hollywood, renaming it Desilu Studios, to shoot seasons 3–6 (1953–1957) of I Love Lucy. After 1956, it became known as Desilu-Cahuenga Studios to avoid confusion with other acquired Desilu locations. In an effort to keep up with the studio's growth, and need for additional sound stages, Arnaz and Ball purchased RKO Radio Pictures from General Tire in 1957 for over $6 million, effectively owning the studio where they had started as contract players. Desilu acquired RKO's two studio complexes, located on Gower Street in Hollywood and in Culver City (now part of the Paramount lot and Culver Studios respectively), along with the Culver City back lot nicknamed "Forty Acres". The sale was achieved by the duo selling their ownership of the once-thought-worthless I Love Lucy films back to CBS for over four million dollars.

In 1962, two years after their marriage dissolved, Ball bought out Arnaz's shares of Desilu, becoming the studio's sole owner. She eventually sold off Desilu in 1967 to Gulf+Western, owners of Paramount Pictures. After the sale, Desilu-Cahuenga became a private production company and was known as Ren-Mar Studios until 2010, when it was acquired by the Red Digital Cinema Camera Company and renamed Red Studios Hollywood.

=== The Mertzes ===
As with My Favorite Husband, I Love Lucy writers decided that the Ricardos needed an older couple to play off. While performing in Husband, veteran character actors Gale Gordon and Bea Benaderet had played Rudolph and Iris Atterbury, an older, more financially stable couple as Mr. Atterbury had been George Cooper's boss. Ball had initially wanted both actors to reprise their roles on television; however, both were unavailable at the time the show went into production as Benaderet was already playing Blanche Morton on The Burns and Allen Show, and Gordon was under contract by CBS to play Mr. Conklin on both the radio and television versions of Our Miss Brooks.

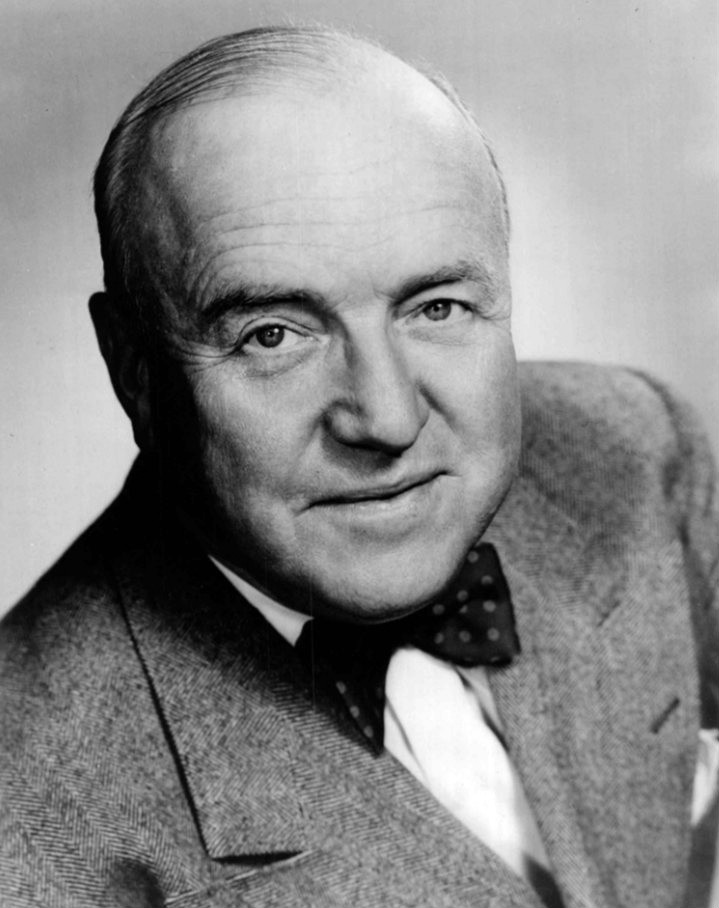
William Frawley in 1951

Casting the Mertzes, as they were now called (the surname taken from a doctor that I Love Lucy scriptwriter Madelyn Pugh knew as a child in Indianapolis), proved to be a challenge. Ball had initially wanted character actor James Gleason, with whom she appeared in the Columbia Pictures film Miss Grant Takes Richmond (1949), to play Fred Mertz. However, Gleason wanted nearly $3,500 per episode to play the role, a price that was far too high to sustain.

Sixty-four-year-old William Frawley, a seasoned vaudevillian and movie character actor with nearly 100 film credits to his name, was a long shot to play Fred Mertz and only came into consideration after he telephoned Ball personally to ask if there was a role for him on her new show. Ball, who had only briefly known Frawley from her days at RKO, suggested him to both Arnaz and CBS. The network objected to the idea of casting Frawley, fearing that his excessive drinking – which was well known in Hollywood – would interfere with a commitment to a live show. Arnaz nonetheless liked Frawley and lobbied hard for him to have the role, even to the point of having Lucy scribes re-tailor the role of Fred Mertz to be a less financially successful and more curmudgeonly (in contrast to Gordon's Mr. Atterbury) character to fit Frawley's persona. CBS relented only after Arnaz contractually bound Frawley to complete sobriety during the production of the show, and reportedly told the veteran actor that if he ever appeared on-set more than once in an intoxicated state he would be fired. Not once during I Love Lucy's nine seasons did Frawley's drinking ever interfere with his performance, and over time Arnaz became one of Frawley's few close friends.

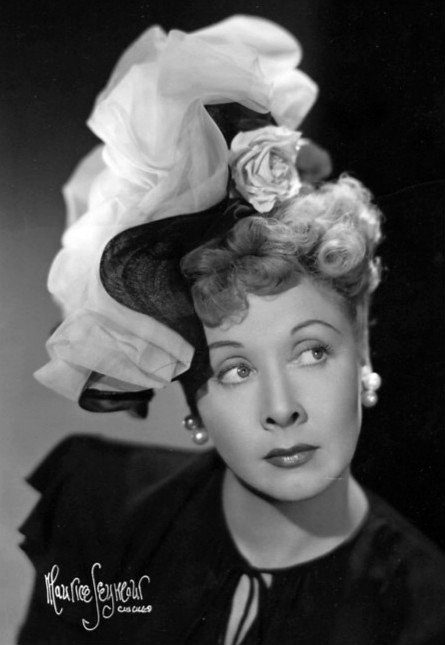
Vivian Vance in 1948

The role of Ethel Mertz also took quite some time to cast. Since Lucy's Husband co-star Bea Benaderet was not available, Mary Wickes, a longtime friend, was offered the role but declined because she did not want to strain her friendship with Ball. Actress Barbara Pepper, who was a close friend of Ball, was also considered for the role. The two had a long history together, as Pepper had been one of the Goldwyn Girls who came to Hollywood with Lucy in 1933. Pepper was ruled out by Ball and Arnaz because she too had a drinking problem like Frawley.

Vivian Vance became a consideration on the recommendation of I Love Lucy director Marc Daniels. Daniels had worked with Vance in New York on Broadway in the early 1940s. Vance had already been a successful stage star performing on Broadway for nearly 20 years in a variety of plays, and in addition, after relocating to Hollywood in the late 1940s, had two film roles to her credit. Nonetheless, by 1951, she was still a relatively unknown actress in Hollywood. Vance was performing in a revival of the play The Voice of the Turtle in La Jolla, California. Arnaz and Jess Oppenheimer went to see her in the play and hired her on the spot. Vance was reluctant to give up her film and stage work for a television show yet was convinced by Daniels that it would be a big break in her career. Ball, however, had many misgivings about hiring Vance, who was younger and far more attractive than the concept of Ethel as an older, somewhat homely woman (Vance was two years older than Ball). Ball was also a believer in the Hollywood adage at the time that there should be only one pretty woman on the set and Ball, being the star of the show, would be it. Arnaz, however, was impressed by Vance's work and hired her. The decision was then made to dress Vance in frumpier clothing to tone down her attractiveness. Eventually realizing that Vance was no threat and was professional, Ball began to warm to her. In 1954, Vance became the first actress to win an Emmy Award for Outstanding Supporting Actress. Vance and Ball developed a close, lifelong friendship with Ball frequently listening to Vance's input during episode productions. In 1962, after the end of I Love Lucy, Ball would ask Vance to co-star in her new series The Lucy Show.

Vance and Frawley disliked each other. However, they were always professional while performing on the show. Frawley derisively described Vance's appearance as "a sack of doorknobs". It was reported that Vance, who was 22 years younger than Frawley, was not really keen on the idea that her character Ethel was married to a man that was old enough to be her father. Vance also complained that Frawley's song-and-dance skills were not what they once were. Frawley and Vance had an adversarial relationship during the entire run of the show.

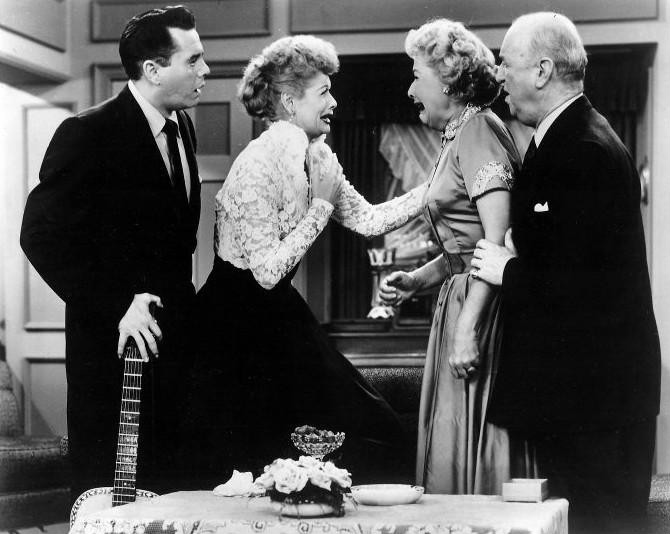
Desi Arnaz, Lucille Ball, Vivian Vance, and William Frawley, from the 1955 episode "Face to Face"

In 1957, I Love Lucy was re-tailored into an hour-long show originally titled The Lucille Ball–Desi Arnaz Show that was to be part of an anthology series called the Westinghouse Desilu Playhouse. The hour-long Lucy–Desi show was to alternate monthly with other hour-long Playhouse shows. The new series put a much heavier emphasis on big-name guest stars and, although the Mertz characters continued into the new series, their roles became somewhat diminished. Although a lighter workload was welcomed by Frawley, Vance came to somewhat resent the change. Arnaz, in an effort to please Vance, for whom he had much respect, proposed doing a spin-off from I Love Lucy called The Mertzes. Seeing a lucrative opportunity and the chance to star in his own show, Frawley was enthused. Vance, however, declined for a number of reasons, the biggest factor being that she felt she and Frawley could barely work together on the ensemble show they were doing at the time, so it would be much less likely the two could work together on their own series. Vance also felt that the Mertz characters would not be as successful without the Ricardos to play off, and despite being her biggest success, she was becoming interested in playing more glamorous roles rather than Ethel. During the thirteen-episode run of the Lucy–Desi hour-long shows, Vance was given a lot more latitude to look more attractive as Ethel, something she was denied during the run of the I Love Lucy episodes. Frawley's resentment of Vance intensified after she declined to do the spin-off show and the two rarely talked to each other outside of their characters' dialogue with one another.

=== Pregnancy and Little Ricky ===
Just before filming the show, Ball and Arnaz learned that she was once again pregnant (after multiple miscarriages earlier in their marriage) with their first child, Lucie Arnaz. They filmed the original pilot while Lucy was "showing" but did not include any references to the pregnancy in the episode. This was because CBS thought that talk of pregnancy might be in bad taste and because an ad agency told Arnaz not to show a pregnant woman.

Later, during the second season, Ball was pregnant again with second child Desi Arnaz Jr., and this time the pregnancy was incorporated into the series' storyline. (Contrary to popular belief, Ball's pregnancy was not television's first on-screen pregnancy, a distinction belonging to Mary Kay Stearns on the late 1940s sitcom Mary Kay and Johnny.)

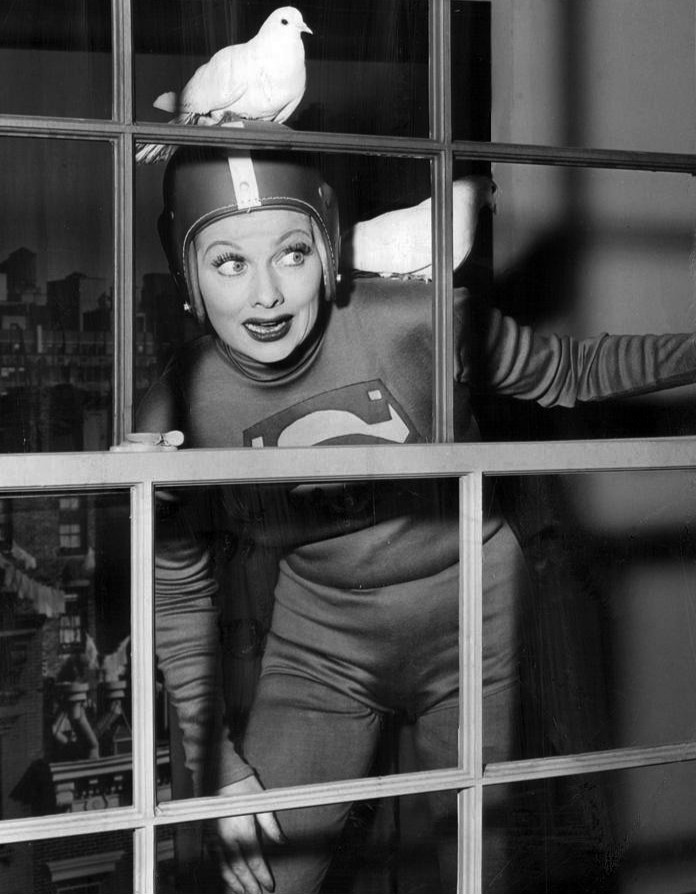
"Lucy and Superman" (1957)

CBS would not allow I Love Lucy to use the word pregnant, so expecting was used instead. In addition, sponsor Philip Morris made the request that Ball not be seen smoking during the pregnancy episodes. The episode "Lucy Is Enceinte" first aired on December 8, 1952 (enceinte being French for expecting or pregnant). One week later, on December 15, 1952, the episode titled "Pregnant Women Are Unpredictable" was aired (although the show never displayed episode titles on the air). The episode in which Lucy Ricardo gives birth, "Lucy Goes to the Hospital", first aired on January 19, 1953, which was the day before the inauguration of Dwight Eisenhower as President of the United States. To increase the publicity of this episode, the original air date was chosen to coincide with Ball's real-life delivery of Desi Jr. by Caesarean section. "Lucy Goes to the Hospital" was watched by more people than any other television program up to that time, with 71.7% of all American television sets tuned in, topping the 67.7 rating for the inauguration coverage the following morning.

Unlike some programs that advance the age of a newborn over a short period, I Love Lucy at first allowed the Ricardos' son Little Ricky to grow up in real time. America saw Little Ricky as an infant in the 1952–53 season and a toddler from 1953 to 1956. However, for the 1956–57 season, Little Ricky suddenly aged by two years, becoming a young school-age boy from 1956 to 1960. Five actors played the role, two sets of twins and later Keith Thibodeaux, whose stage name when playing Ricky Ricardo Jr. was Richard Keith. (In "Lucy and Superman", Little Ricky is mentioned as being five years old but it had been less than four years since the airing of "Lucy Goes to the Hospital".)

Jess Oppenheimer stated in his memoir, Laughs, Luck...and Lucy: How I Came to Create the Most Popular Sitcom of All Time, that the initial plan was to match the sex of the Ricardo's baby with Ball's real baby, inserting one of two alternative endings into the broadcast print at the last minute. When logistical difficulties convinced Oppenheimer to abandon this plan, he advised Desi Arnaz that as head writer, he would have Lucy Ricardo give birth to a boy. Desi Arnaz agreed, telling Oppenheimer that Ball had already given him one girl, and might give him another – this might be his only chance to get a son. When the baby boy was born, Desi Arnaz immediately called Oppenheimer and told him, "Lucy followed your script. Ain't she something?", to which Oppenheimer replied "Terrific! That makes me the greatest writer in the world!".

=== Opening ===
Shot of the opening animation used in season one's first 20 episodes, one of at least 13 opening animations

The opening familiar to most viewers, featuring the credits superimposed over a "heart on satin" image, was created specifically for the 1959–66 CBS daytime network rebroadcasts and subsequent syndication. As originally broadcast, the episodes opened with animated matchstick figures of Arnaz and Ball making reference to whoever the particular episode's sponsor was. These sequences were created by the animation team of William Hanna and Joseph Barbera, who declined screen credit because they were technically under exclusive contract to MGM at the time.

The original sponsor was cigarette maker Philip Morris, so the program opened with a cartoon of Lucy and Ricky climbing down a pack of Philip Morris cigarettes. In the early episodes, Lucy and Ricky, as well as Ethel and Fred on occasion, were shown smoking Philip Morris cigarettes. Lucy even went so far as to parody Johnny Roventini's image as the Philip Morris "bellhop" in the May 5, 1952, episode, "Lucy Does a TV Commercial". Since the original sponsor references were no longer appropriate when the shows went into syndication, a new opening was needed, which resulted in the classic "heart on satin" opening. According to a 2003 interview conducted by the Television Academy Foundation with optical effects specialist Howard Anderson Jr., Anderson's studio handled the post-production of the "heart on satin" title cards used in syndicated rebroadcasts of I Love Lucy. The original design of the heart motif and its typography was created by Verdun Philip Cook, a typographer and animator who collaborated with Desilu Productions during the show's original run. Other sponsors, whose products appeared during the original openings, were Procter & Gamble for Cheer and Lilt Home Permanent (1954–57), General Foods for Sanka (1955–57), and Ford Motor Company (1956–57). The later Lucille Ball–Desi Arnaz Show was sponsored by Ford Motor Company (1957–58) and Westinghouse Electric Corporation (1958–60), as part of the Westinghouse Desilu Playhouse.

The original openings, with the sponsor names edited out, were revived on TV Land showings, with a TV Land logo superimposed to obscure the original sponsor's logo. However, this has led some people to believe that the restored introduction was created specifically for TV Land as an example of kitsch.

The animated openings, along with the middle commercial introductory animations, are included, fully restored, in the DVDs. However, the openings are listed as special features within the disks with the "heart on satin" image opening the actual episodes.

The complete original broadcast versions of Seasons 1 and 2, as seen in 1951–1953 with intros, closings, and all commercials, are included on their respective Ultimate Season Blu-ray editions.

=== Theme song ===
The I Love Lucy theme song was written by two-time Oscar-nominee Eliot Daniel. Lyrics were later written by five-time Oscar-nominee Harold Adamson, for Desi Arnaz to sing in the 1953 episode "Lucy's Last Birthday":

I love Lucy and she loves me.
We're as happy as two can be.
Sometimes we quarrel but then
How we love making up again.

Lucy kisses like no one can.
She's my missus and I'm her man,
And life is heaven you see,
'Cause I love Lucy, Yes I love Lucy, and Lucy loves me!

"I Love Lucy", sung by Desi Arnaz with Paul Weston and the Norman Luboff Choir, was released as the B-side of "There's a Brand New Baby (At Our House)" by Columbia Records (catalog number 39937) in 1953. The song was covered by Michael Franks on the album Dragonfly Summer (1993). In 1977, the Wilton Place Street Band had a Top 40 hit with a disco version of the theme, "Disco Lucy".

== Episodes ==
Series	Season	Episodes	Originally released		Rank	Rating	Households (millions)
Series	Season	Episodes	First released	Last released	Rank	Rating	Households (millions)
I Love Lucy	1	35	October 15, 1951	June 9, 1952	3	50.9	7.78
I Love Lucy	2	31	September 15, 1952	June 29, 1953	1	67.3	13.72
I Love Lucy	3	31	October 5, 1953	May 24, 1954	1	58.8	15.28
I Love Lucy	4	30	October 4, 1954	May 30, 1955	1	49.3	15.13
I Love Lucy	5	26	October 3, 1955	May 14, 1956	2	46.1	16.08
I Love Lucy	6	27	October 1, 1956	May 6, 1957	1	43.7	16.99
The Lucy–Desi Comedy Hour	1	5	November 6, 1957	April 14, 1958	—N/a	—N/a	—N/a
The Lucy–Desi Comedy Hour	2	5	October 6, 1958	June 5, 1959	—N/a	—N/a	—N/a
The Lucy–Desi Comedy Hour	3	3	September 25, 1959	April 1, 1960	—N/a	—N/a	—N/a

=== Broadcast history ===
I Love Lucy aired Mondays from 9:00 to 9:30 PM ET on CBS for its entire first run. Each year during its summer hiatus its timeslot was occupied by various summer replacement series. Beginning in April 1955 CBS added reruns from the show's early years to its early evening weekend schedule. This would be the first of several occasions when I Love Lucy reruns would become part of CBS's evening, prime time, and (later on) daytime schedules.

In fall 1967, CBS began offering the series in off-network syndication. As of August 2017, the reruns air on the Hallmark Channel and MeTV networks and scores of television stations in the U.S. and around the world. It is currently on Paramount+.

In addition, CBS has run numerous specials, including a succession of annual specials which feature episodes which have been newly colorized.

On February 14, 2023, Pluto TV launched a 24-hour I Love Lucy channel in the United States.

The show also reruns on Catchy Comedy.

=== Nielsen ratings ===
The episode "Lucy Goes to the Hospital", which first aired on Monday, January 19, 1953, garnered a then-record rating of 71.7, meaning that 71.7% of all households with television sets were tuned to the program, the equivalent of some 44 million viewers. That record is surpassed only by Elvis Presley's first of three appearances on The Ed Sullivan Show, which aired on September 9, 1956 (82.6% share, 60.710 million viewers and a 57.1 rating ). The overall rating of 67.3 for the entire 1952 season of I Love Lucy continues to be the highest average rating for any single season of a TV show.

== Primetime Emmy Awards and nominations ==
1952

- Best Comedy Show – Nominated (Winner: The Red Skelton Hour)

1953

- Best Situation Comedy – Won
- Best Comedienne: Lucille Ball – Won

1954

- Best Female Star of a Regular Series: Lucille Ball – Nominated (Winner: Eve Arden for Our Miss Brooks)
- Best Series Supporting Actor: William Frawley – Nominated (Winner: Art Carney for The Jackie Gleason Show)
- Best Series Supporting Actress: Vivian Vance – Won
- Best Situation Comedy – Won

1955

- Best Actress Starring in a Regular Series: Lucille Ball – Nominated (Winner: Loretta Young for The Loretta Young Show)
- Best Situation Comedy Series – Nominated (Winner: The Danny Thomas Show)
- Best Supporting Actor in a Regular Series: William Frawley – Nominated (Winner: Art Carney for The Jackie Gleason Show)
- Best Supporting Actress in a Regular Series: Vivian Vance – Nominated (Winner: Audrey Meadows for The Jackie Gleason Show)
- Best Written Comedy Material: Jess Oppenheimer, Bob Carroll Jr. and Madelyn Davis – Nominated (Winners: James B. Allardice, Jack Douglas, Hal Kanter and Harry Winkler for The George Gobel Show)

1956

- Best Actor in a Supporting Role: William Frawley – Nominated (Winner: Art Carney for The Honeymooners)
- Best Actress – Continuing Performance: Lucille Ball – Won
- Best Comedy Writing: Jess Oppenheimer, Madelyn Davis, Bob Carroll Jr., Bob Schiller and Bob Weiskopf for "L.A. at Last" – Nominated (Winners: Nat Hiken, Barry E. Blitzer, Arnold M. Auerbach, Harvey Orkin, Vin Bogert, Arnie Rosen, Coleman Jacoby, Tony Webster and Terry Ryan for The Phil Silvers Show: "You'll Never Get Rich")

1957

- Best Continuing Performance by a Comedienne in a Series: Lucille Ball – Nominated (Winner: Nanette Fabray for Caesar's Hour)
- Best Supporting Performance by an Actor: William Frawley – Nominated (Winner: Carl Reiner for Caesar's Hour)
- Best Supporting Performance by an Actress: Vivian Vance – Nominated (Winner: Pat Carroll for Caesar's Hour)

1958

- Best Continuing Performance (Female) in a Series by a Comedienne, Singer, Hostess, Dancer, M.C., Announcer, Narrator, Panelist, or any Person who Essentially Plays Herself: Lucille Ball – Nominated (Winner: Dinah Shore for The Dinah Shore Show)
- Best Continuing Supporting Performance by an Actor in a Dramatic or Comedy Series: William Frawley – Nominated (Winner: Carl Reiner for Caesar's Hour)
- Best Continuing Supporting Performance by an Actress in a Dramatic or Comedy Series: Vivian Vance – Nominated (Winner: Ann B. Davis for The Bob Cummings Show)

== In other media ==
=== Radio ===
There was some thought about creating an I Love Lucy radio show to run in conjunction with the television series as was being done at the time with the CBS hit show Our Miss Brooks. On February 27, 1952, a sample I Love Lucy radio show was produced, but it never aired. This was a pilot episode, created by editing the soundtrack of the television episode "Breaking the Lease", with added Arnaz narration (in character as Ricky Ricardo). It included commercials for Philip Morris, which sponsored the television series. While it never aired on radio at the time in the 1950s (Philip Morris eventually sponsored a radio edition of My Little Margie instead), copies of this radio pilot episode have been circulating among old-time radio collectors for years, and this radio pilot episode has aired in more recent decades on numerous local radio stations that air some old-time radio programming.

=== Merchandise ===
Ball and Arnaz authorized various types of I Love Lucy merchandise. Beginning in November 1952, I Love Lucy dolls, manufactured by the American Character Doll Company, were sold. Adult-size I Love Lucy pajamas and a bedroom set were also produced; all of these items appeared on the show.

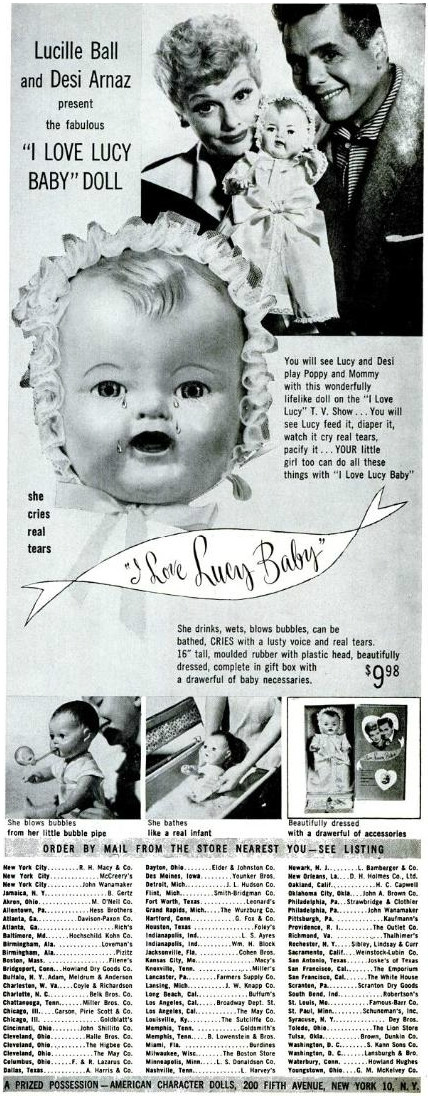
I Love Lucy doll

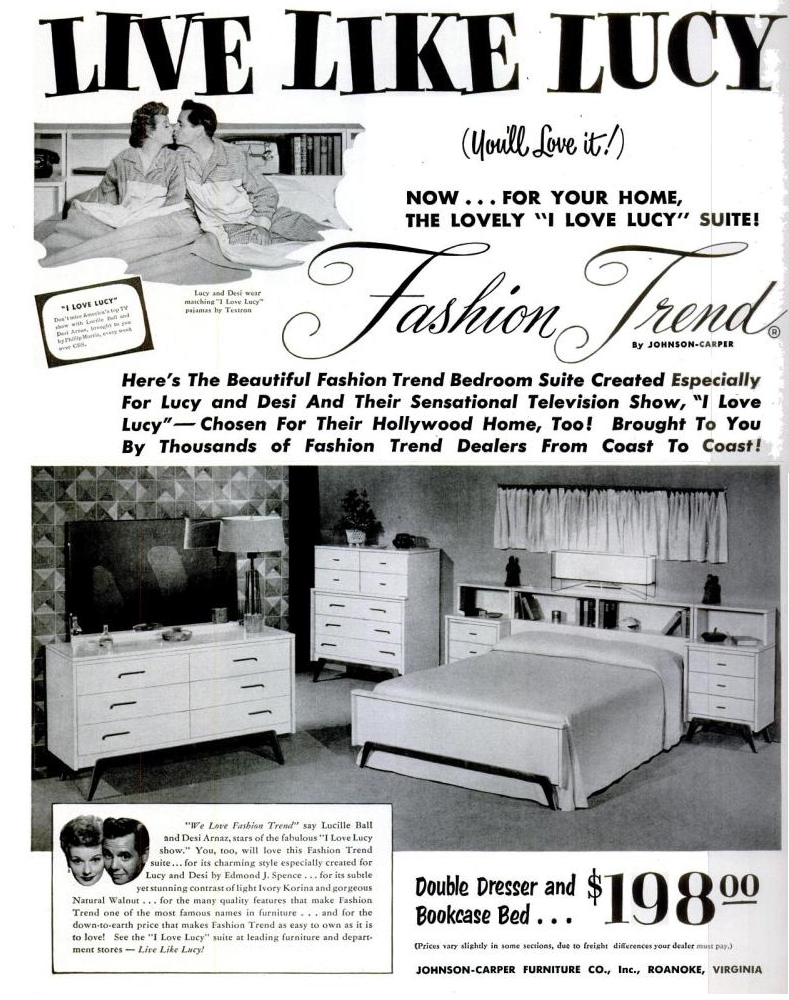
I Love Lucy bedroom set

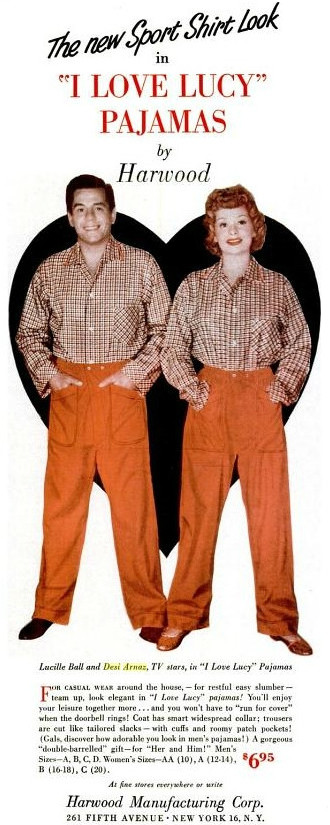
I Love Lucy pajamas

=== Comic book and comic strip ===
Dell Comics published 35 issues of an I Love Lucy comic book between 1954 and 1962 including two try-out Four Color issues (#535 and #559). King Features syndicated a comic strip (written by Lawrence Nadel and drawn by Bob Oksner, jointly credited as "Bob Lawrence") from 1952 to 1955. Oksner recounted, "Whenever [Desi Arnaz] was in New York, he would invite me to lunch at 21. He was interested in improving the strip by making him handsomer. He would say, 'You make Lucy so beautiful. What can you do with me?'" [emphasis in original] Eternity Comics in the early 1990s issued comic books that reprinted the strip and Dell comic book series.

== After I Love Lucy ==
=== Hour-long format ===
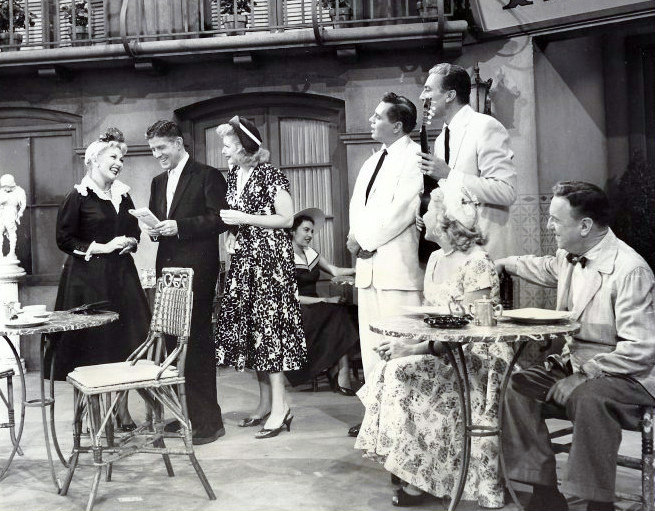
The first one-hour episode, "Lucy Takes a Cruise to Havana", is an extended flashback of how Lucy met Ricky. L–R: Ann Sothern, Rudy Vallee, Lucille Ball, Desi Arnaz, Cesar Romero, Vivian Vance and William Frawley (1957)

After the conclusion of the sixth season of I Love Lucy, Ball and Arnaz decided to cut down on the number of episodes that were filmed. Renamed The Lucille Ball–Desi Arnaz Show, also known as The Lucy–Desi Comedy Hour, the program was extended to an hour and included guest stars in each episode. Thirteen episodes aired from 1957 to 1960. The main cast, Lucille Ball, Desi Arnaz, Vivian Vance, William Frawley and Little Ricky/Richard Keith (birth name Keith Thibodeaux), were all in the show. The Lucy–Desi Comedy Hour is available on DVD, released as I Love Lucy: The Final Seasons 7, 8, & 9. On March 2, 1960, Arnaz's birthday.

=== Vivian Vance and William Frawley ===
As previously mentioned, Vance and Frawley were offered a chance to take their characters to their own spin-off series. Frawley was willing, but Vance refused to ever work with Frawley again since the two did not get along. Frawley appeared once more with Lucille Ball – in an episode of The Lucy Show in 1965, which did not include Vance (who by then had ceased to be a regular on that show). This was his last screen appearance with Ball. Frawley died in Hollywood on March 3, 1966, of a heart attack at age 79.

=== Lucille Ball's subsequent network shows ===
In 1962, Ball began a six-year run with The Lucy Show, followed immediately in 1968 by six more years on a third sitcom, Here's Lucy, ending her regular appearances on CBS in 1974. Both The Lucy Show and Here's Lucy included Vance as recurring characters named Viv (Vivian Bagley Bunson on The Lucy Show and Vivian Jones on Here's Lucy), so named because she was tired of being recognized on the street and addressed as "Ethel". Vance was a regular during the first three seasons of The Lucy Show and continued to make guest appearances through the years on The Lucy Show and on Here's Lucy. In 1977, Vance and Ball were reunited one last time in the CBS special Lucy Calls the President, which co-starred Gale Gordon, whom Ball had known for very many years and who had appeared as a regular on her television shows since 1963, becoming even more prominent once Vance left The Lucy Show in 1965.

In 1986, Ball tried another sitcom, Life with Lucy. The series debuted on ABC to solid ratings, landing in Nielsen's Top 25 for the week. Its ratings quickly declined, however, and resulted in a cancellation after eight episodes.

=== Legacy, critical acclaim and other honors ===
In 1989, the never-seen pilot episode of I Love Lucy was discovered and revealed in a CBS television special, hosted by Lucie Arnaz, becoming the highest-rated program of the season.

I Love Lucy continues to be held in high esteem by television critics and remains perennially popular. It was one of the first American programs seen on British television – which became more open to commerce with the September 1955 launch of ITV, a commercial network that aired the series. In 1982, the launch of a second terrestrial TV station devoted to advertising-funded broadcasting (Channel 4) saw the show introduced to a new generation of fans in the UK, with the Channel 4 network repeating the program several times between 1983 and 1994. As of January 2015, meanwhile, it remains the longest-running program to air continuously in the Los Angeles area, almost 60 years after production ended. However, the series is currently aired on KTTV on weekends and now KCOP on weekdays because both stations are a duopoly. KTTV was the original CBS-affiliated station in Los Angeles until 1951, just before I Love Lucy premiered on KNXT Channel 2 (now KCBS-TV) when CBS bought that station the same year. In the US, reruns have aired nationally on TBS (1980s–1990s), Nick at Nite (1994–2001), and TV Land (2001–2008) in addition to local channels. TV Land ended its run of the series by giving viewers the opportunity to vote on the show's top 25 greatest episodes on December 31, 2008, through the network's website. Unlike some shows, to which a cable channel is given exclusive rights to maximize ratings, I Love Lucy has been consistently broadcast on multiple channels simultaneously. Hallmark Channel is now the home for I Love Lucy in the United States, with the show having moved to the network on January 2, 2009, while the national version of Weigel Broadcasting's MeTV digital subchannel network has carried the program since its debut on December 15, 2010, depending on the market (in markets where another station holds the rights, The Lucy Show is substituted). The show is seen on Fox Classics in Australia.

In addition to Primetime Emmy Awards and nominations, I Love Lucy has many honors including the following:

- The Lucille Ball Desi Arnaz Museum in Jamestown, New York is a museum memorializing Lucy and I Love Lucy, including replicas of the NYC apartment set (located in the Desilu Playhouse facility in the Rapaport Center).
- In 1990, I Love Lucy became the first television show to be inducted into the Television Hall of Fame.
- In 1997, the episodes "Lucy Does a TV Commercial" and "Lucy's Italian Movie" were respectively ranked No. 2 and No. 18 on TV Guide's list of the 100 Greatest Episodes of All Time.
- From 1997 to 2011, Mattel released a series of I Love Lucy dolls inspired by episodes of the show, and collector's edition designs under its Pink Label line.
- In 1999, Entertainment Weekly ranked the birth of Little Ricky as the fifth greatest moment in television history.
- In 2002, TV Guide ranked I Love Lucy No. 2 on its list of the 50 greatest shows, behind Seinfeld and ahead of The Honeymooners (According to TV Guide columnist Matt Roush, there was a "passionate" internal debate about whether I Love Lucy should have been first instead of Seinfeld. He stated that this was the main source of controversy in putting together the list.)
- In 2007, Time magazine placed the show on its unranked list of the 100 best television shows.
- In 2012, I Love Lucy was ranked the Best TV Comedy and the Best TV Show in Best in TV: The Greatest TV Shows of Our Time.
- In 2013, TV Guide ranked I Love Lucy as the third greatest show of all time.
- In 2015, a survey of 2,800 actors, producers, directors, and other industry people conducted by The Hollywood Reporter named I Love Lucy as their #8 favorite show.
- In 2023, Variety chose I Love Lucy as the greatest TV show of all time.

=== Documentaries and dramatizations ===
On April 28, 1990, CBS aired a television movie titled I Love Lucy: The Very First Show hosted by Lucie Arnaz, daughter of Lucille Ball and Desi Arnaz, with commentary that showed the original unaired pilot episode of I Love Lucy that was produced by Ball and Desi Arnaz themselves and found after 40 years. The movie was nominated for a Primetime Emmy Award as an "Outstanding Informational Special".

On February 10, 1991, CBS aired a television movie titled Lucy & Desi: Before the Laughter, about the lives of Ball and Desi Arnaz. The movie recreated a number of scenes from classic I Love Lucy episodes, including "Lucy Thinks Ricky Is Trying to Murder Her" and "Lucy Does a TV Commercial". Frances Fisher starred as Ball and Maurice Benard as Desi Arnaz.

On May 4, 2003, CBS aired a television movie titled Lucy, portraying the life of Ball and recreating a number of scenes from classic I Love Lucy episodes, including "Lucy Does a TV Commercial", "Lucy Is Enceinte", and "Job Switching". Near the end of the movie, a selection of TV Guide covers is seen in a hallway, showing I Love Lucy franchises on their covers. Also included is close-up of a New York Post article about the birth of Little Ricky. Rachel York starred as Ball and Danny Pino as Desi Arnaz.

In October 2011, the stage play I Love Lucy Live on Stage premiered to sold-out houses at the Greenway Court Theatre in Los Angeles. Staged and directed by Rick Sparks, the show featured the performance of two I Love Lucy episodes – "The Benefit" and "Lucy Has Her Eyes Examined", presented to the theater audience as though they were attending a filming at the Desilu Playhouse in the 1950s. In 2012, the show began a national tour which lasted until 2015.

In July 2018, I Love Lucy: A Funny Thing Happened on the Way to the Sitcom, a behind-the-scenes comedy about I Love Lucy by Gregg Oppenheimer (son of series creator Jess Oppenheimer), had its world premiere in a Los Angeles production by L.A. Theatre Works. Recorded before a live audience at the James Bridges Theater, UCLA, the production, directed by Michael Hackett, aired on public radio and was released on audio CD and as a downloadable file in September of that year. The performance starred Sarah Drew as Ball, Oscar Nuñez as Desi Arnaz, and Seamus Dever as Oppenheimer. A serialized version, titled LUCY LOVES DESI: A Funny Thing Happened on the Way to the Sitcom, was produced in August 2020 by Jarvis & Ayres Productions and aired in the UK on BBC Radio 4, starring Anne Heche as Ball, Wilmer Valderamma as Desi Arnaz, Jared Harris as Oppenheimer, Stacy Keach as William Frawley, and Alfred Molina as CBS Executive Harry Ackerman. In January 2023, L.A. Theatre Works mounted a 22-city U.S. national tour of the play as LUCY LOVES DESI: A Funny Thing Happened on the Way to the Sitcom. In November 2023, Next Stage Press published the play's script, making performance licenses available to schools, community theater groups, and local theater companies.

In the spring of 2020, NBC's sitcom Will & Grace paid tribute to I Love Lucy with a special episode titled "We Love Lucy". During the episode Lucy and Ricky Ricardo, along with Ethel and Fred Mertz, appear in dream sequences based on scenes from the 1951 CBS series. Lucie Arnaz made a cameo in the episode in the role originated in the "Job Switching" episode by actress Elvia Allman as the Factory Foreperson.

In 2021, Being the Ricardos, a film written and directed by Aaron Sorkin, about the relationship between I Love Lucy stars Ball and Desi Arnaz, was released. Nicole Kidman and Javier Bardem star as Ball and Desi Arnaz, while J. K. Simmons, Nina Arianda, Tony Hale, Alia Shawkat, Jake Lacy, and Clark Gregg are featured in supporting roles. It received a limited theatrical release by Amazon Studios in the United States on December 10, 2021, prior to streaming worldwide on Prime Video on December 21, 2021.

In 2022, Amazon Prime Video released the documentary Lucy and Desi. Directed by Amy Poehler, it was nominated for a Primetime Emmy Award for Outstanding Directing for a Documentary/Nonfiction Program.

== In color ==
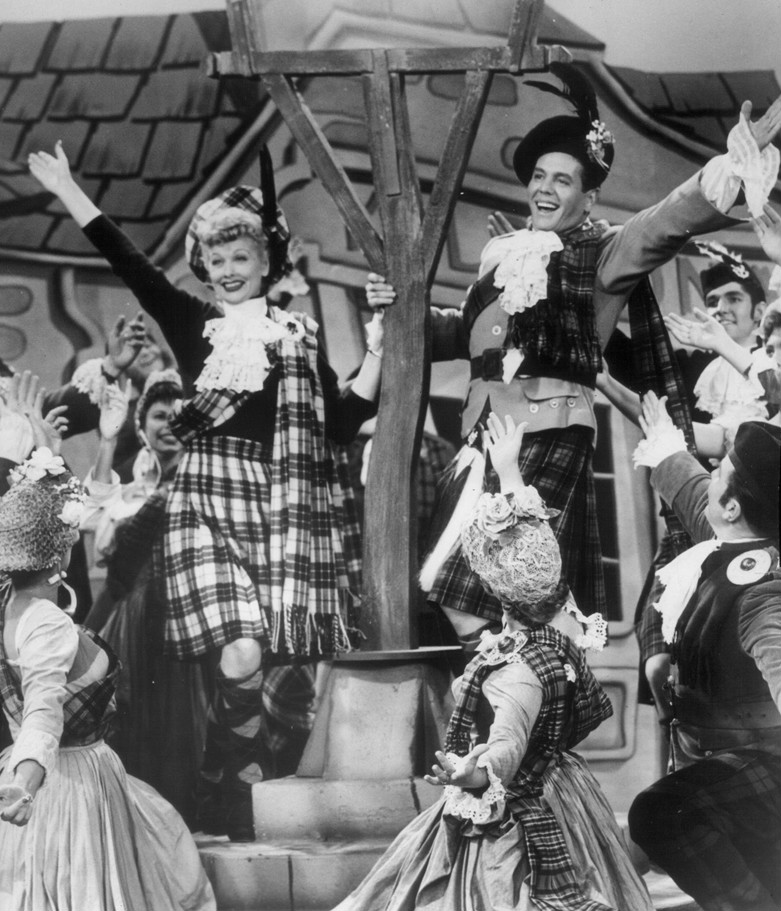
"Lucy Goes to Scotland" (1956), the first episode to be digitally colorized

Several classic episodes of I Love Lucy have been colorized. Star and producer Desi Arnaz had expressed interest in airing the show in color as early as 1955, but the cost of such a presentation was prohibitive at the time.

The first episode to be colorized was the Christmas special, which had been feared to be lost for many years, as it was not included in the regular syndication package with the rest of the series. A copy was discovered in 1989 in the CBS vaults and was aired by CBS during December of that year in its original black-and-white format. In 1990, this episode was again aired in the days prior to Christmas, but this time the framing sequence was in color, while the clips from earlier episodes remained in black and white. The special performed surprisingly well in the ratings during both years and aired on CBS each December until 1994.

In 2007, as the "Complete Series" DVD set was being prepared for release, DVD producer Gregg Oppenheimer decided to have the episode "Lucy Goes to Scotland" digitally colorized (referencing color publicity stills and color "home movies" taken on the set during production), making it the first I Love Lucy episode to be fully colorized. Four years later, Time Life released the "Lucy's Italian Movie" episode for the first time in full color as part of the "Essential 'I Love Lucy'" collection.

The colorized "Lucy Goes to Scotland" episode has never aired on television, but that episode, along with the Christmas special and "Lucy's Italian Movie", were packaged together on the 2013 I Love Lucy Colorized Christmas DVD. In 2014, Target stores sold an exclusive version of the DVD that also included "Job Switching".

As of 2025, a total of 18 episodes are known to have been colorized, 17 of which have been released on some form of home media.

=== Annual colorized specials ===
On December 20, 2013, CBS revived an annual holiday tradition when it re-aired the Christmas special for the first time in nearly two decades. The Christmas special's framing sequence was colorized anew. The network paired this special with the color version of "Lucy's Italian Movie" episode. This special attracted 8.7 million people. Nearly a year later, on December 7, 2014, the Christmas special was again aired on CBS, but this time paired with the popular episode "Job Switching", which was newly colorized for that broadcast. That episode appeared on the "I Love Lucy: The Ultimate Season 2" Blu-ray edition released on August 4, 2015. CBS aired the Christmas special again on December 23, 2015, with the flashback scenes being colorized for the first time, and with a colorized "Lucy Does a TV Commercial" replacing "Job Switching". CBS next aired the Christmas special on December 2, 2016, this time paired with the newly colorized "Lucy Gets in Pictures". On December 22, 2017, the Christmas episode was followed by a newly colorized episode, "The Fashion Show". On December 14, 2018, the Christmas episode was paired with a newly colorized episode, "Pioneer Women".

On May 17, 2015, CBS began a new springtime tradition when it aired two newly colorized episodes in an "I Love Lucy Superstar Special" consisting of "L.A. at Last" and "Lucy and Superman", which attracted 6.4 million viewers. A DVD of this special was released on October 4, 2016. A second "Superstar Special" containing the newly colorized two-part episode "Lucy Visits Grauman's" and "Lucy and John Wayne" aired on May 20, 2016 and was released on DVD on January 17, 2017. A third "Superstar Special" aired on May 19, 2017, featuring two more newly colorized Hollywood-based episodes: "The Dancing Star" featuring Van Johnson, and "Harpo Marx". A two-episode "Funny Money Special" was introduced on April 19, 2019, featuring the episodes "The Million-Dollar Idea" and "Bonus Bucks", both from early 1954. On December 20, 2019, CBS aired its annual I Love Lucy Christmas episode along with a new colorized episode, "Paris At Last". The I Love Lucy Christmas Special scored a 4.9 million in the ratings, becoming the night's most-watched show on television.

=== Colorized feature film ===
On August 6, 2019, Ball's would-be 108th birthday, a one-night-only event took place in movie theaters around the United States, I Love Lucy: A Colorized Celebration, a feature film consisting of five colorized episodes, three of which contain never-before-seen content. The episodes included are: "The Million Dollar Idea" (1954), "Lucy Does a TV Commercial" (1952), "Pioneer Women" (1952), "Job Switching" (1952) and "L.A. at Last!" (1955). A short documentary on the colorization process of the episodes was also included. The film proved to be very successful, grossing $777,645 from 660 theaters across the country, coming in at #6 at the domestic box office and beating Disney's Aladdin.

== Home media ==
Beginning in the summer of 2001, Columbia House Television began releasing I Love Lucy on DVD in chronological order. They began that summer with the pilot and the first three episodes on a single DVD. Every six weeks, another volume of four episodes would be released on DVD in chronological order. During the summer of 2002, each DVD would contain between five and seven episodes on a single DVD. They continued to release the series very slowly and would not even begin to release any season 2 episodes until the middle of 2002. By the spring of 2003, the third season on DVD began to be released with about six episodes released every six weeks to mail-order subscribers. All these DVDs have the same features as the DVDs eventually released in the season box sets.

By the fall of 2003, season-four episodes began to be offered by mail. By the spring of 2004, season-five DVDs with about six episodes each began to be released gradually. Columbia House ended the distribution of these mail-order DVDs in the Winter of 2005. They began releasing complete season sets in the summer of 2004 every few months. They stated that Columbia House subscribers would get these episodes through mail before any box sets with the same episodes were released. Columbia House finally ended gradual subscriptions in 2005, several months before season 5 became available in retail. Columbia House then began to make season box sets available instead of these single volumes.

CBS DVD (distributed by Paramount) has released all six seasons of I Love Lucy on DVD in Region 1, as well as all 13 episodes of The Lucy and Desi Comedy Hour (as I Love Lucy: The Final Seasons – 7, 8, & 9). Bonus features include rare on-set color footage and the "Desilu/Westinghouse" promotional film, as well as deleted scenes, original openings and interstitials (before they were altered or replaced for syndication), and on-air flubs. These DVDs had features and content identical to that of the mail-order single sets available until 2005.

In December 2013, the first high-definition release of I Love Lucy was announced, with the Blu-ray edition of the first season scheduled for May 5, 2014. The Second Season Ultimate Blu-ray was released on August 4, 2015.

On September 25, 2024, it was announced that a Blu-ray box set of the complete series would be released on November 5, 2024.

Release	Ep #	DVD release date	Blu-ray release date
The Complete 1st Season	35	September 23, 2003 (re-released June 7, 2005) (re-released October 9, 2012)	May 6, 2014
The Complete 2nd Season	31	August 31, 2004 (re-released October 9, 2012)	August 4, 2015
The Complete 3rd Season	31	February 1, 2005 (re-released October 9, 2012)	
The Complete 4th Season	30	May 3, 2005 (re-released October 9, 2012)	
The Complete 5th Season	26	August 16, 2005 (re-released November 6, 2012)	
The Complete 6th Season	27	May 2, 2006 (re-released November 6, 2012)	
The Final Seasons 7, 8 & 9	13	March 13, 2007 (re-released November 6, 2012)	
The Complete Series	193	October 23, 2007 (re-released November 3, 2015)	November 5, 2024

=== Other releases ===
- I Love Lucy's Zany Road Trip: California Here We Come!, a compilation of 27 episodes, released by CBS/FOX Video on VHS in 1992
- "I Love Lucy – Season 1" (9 separate discs labeled "Volumes", the first volume released July 2, 2002, final volume released September 23, 2003)
- "I Love Lucy – Season 1" (9 Volumes in a box set, released September 23, 2003)
- "I Love Lucy – 50th Anniversary Special" (1 disc, released October 1, 2002)
- "I Love Lucy: The Movie and Other Great Rarities" (1 disc, released April 27, 2010) (Also included as a bonus disc in the complete series set.)
- "The Best of I Love Lucy" (2 discs: 14 episodes, released in June 2011 in conjunction with the 60th anniversary of the series and Lucille Ball's 100th birthday; sold exclusively through Target.)

The DVD releases feature the syndicated heart opening and offer the original broadcast openings as bonus features, except the season 6 DVD allows viewers to choose whether to watch the episodes with the original opening or the syndicated opening. The TV Land openings are not on these DVDs.

Initially, the first season was offered in volumes, with four episodes per disc. After the success of releasing seasons 2, 3, and 4 in slim packs, the first season was re-released as a seven-disc set, requiring new discs to be mastered and printed to include more episodes per disc so there would be fewer discs in the set. For the complete series box set, the first season would be redone again, this time to six DVDs, retaining all bonus features. The individual volume discs for the first season are still in print but are rare for lack of shelf space and because the slim packs are more popular. In 2012, all-season sets were reissued in slipcovered clear standard-sized Amaray DVD cases, with season 1 being the six-disc version as opposed to the seven-disc version.

Episodes feature English closed captioning but only Spanish subtitles.

In Australia and the UK, the first three seasons were finally released in Region 2 & Region 4 on August 3, 2010, by CBS, distributed by Paramount. Season 1 includes the pilot and all 35 Season 1 episodes in a seven-disc set. Season 2 includes all 31 Season 2 episodes in a five-disc set. Season 3 includes all 31 Season 3 episodes in a five-disc set. Season 2 and 3 are in a slimline pack. All three seasons have been restored and digitally remastered. All episodes appear in order of their original air dates, although it is stated that some episodes may be edited from their original network versions. It is unknown if the remaining seasons will be released individually. A complete-series box set titled I Love Lucy: Complete Collection was scheduled for release on April 6, 2016, and in the UK on May 30, 2016. This collection contains 34 DVDs with all six seasons of I Love Lucy and all 13 episodes of The Lucy–Desi Comedy Hour.

In September 2018, Time Life released a DVD, Lucy: The Ultimate Collection, which collected 76 episodes of I Love Lucy, The Lucy–Desi Comedy Hour, The Lucy Show, Here's Lucy, and the short-lived ABC TV series Life with Lucy (which had at the time never before been released to home media), plus a wide variety of bonus features.

A DVD collection, I Love Lucy: Colorized Collection, was released on August 13, 2019. It contains every colorized episode of I Love Lucy aired as of its release date. On November 5, 2024, a colorized version of "Lucy and the Loving Cup" was first released on the I Love Lucy: The Complete Series Blu-ray Collection. This means that "Paris at Last", which aired as part of the December 2019 edition of the Christmas Special after the colorized DVD collection had been released, is the only colorized episode currently not available on home media.

== See also ==
- Statue of Lucille Ball
- Ricky (song)
- LucyPhone
