= Marco Rizo =

Cuban and American musician (1920–1998)

- Born: Marco Rizo Ayala; November 30, 1920; Santiago de Cuba, Cuba
- Died: September 8, 1998 (aged 77); New York City, New York, U.S.
- Occupations: Pianist, composer, arranger
- Years active: 1940–98

Marco Rizo Ayala (November 30, 1920 – September 8, 1998) was a Cuban and American pianist, composer, and arranger. He mastered the 19th century works of composers Manuel Saumell and Ignacio Cervantes. He is best known for his role as pianist, arranger and orchestrator for the American television sitcom I Love Lucy which aired from 1951 to 1957.

Throughout his career which combined the techniques of his classical training with Afro-Cuban and jazz rhythms, Rizo recorded nearly 30 albums. He was born in Santiago de Cuba, Oriente, Cuba.

== Early life ==
Rizo's father, Sebastian, a flutist with the Santiago Symphony Orchestra, served as his son's first musical instructor. In 1932, Marco moved to Havana to attend the National Conservatory of Music, where he studied under the tutelage of Spanish composer Pedro San Juan. He remained there for six years, and in 1938 was named the official pianist of the Havana Philharmonic Orquestra, performing under the direction of Ernesto Lecuona. In 1939, he performed duo piano recitals with Ernesto Lecuona. Rizo was considered Cuba's most important concert pianist by the age of 16. Rizo became interested in jazz through his work with his father's Rizo-Ayala Jazz Band.

In 1940, he migrated to the United States, having received a scholarship to the Juilliard School of Music in New York City. There, he studied under Rosina Lhévinne. During World War II, Rizo performed and worked with the 2nd Army Military Band.

== Professional career ==
At the end of the war, Rizo's childhood friend Desi Arnaz asked him to join as the pianist and orchestrator for his band, the Desi Arnaz Orchestra. He toured the U.S. with the band until 1950. When Arnaz started production of I Love Lucy, he once again turned to Rizo, hiring him to be the pianist and orchestrator for the show between 1951 and 1957. Rizo also made several on-camera appearances on the show throughout its run on television. Contrary to popular belief he did not write the I Love Lucy theme by himself; it had music by Rizo, Eliot Daniel and Desi Arnaz with lyrics by Harold Adamson. The lyrics were only heard once on the series, in the season three episode "Lucy's Last Birthday" made in 1953. After the I Love Lucy show ended, he remained with CBS and worked as pianist-arranger for Bob Hope.

While in Los Angeles, he attended UCLA and studied under Igor Stravinsky and Mario Castelnuovo-Tedesco. Rizo composed motion picture music for Columbia, Paramount and MGM Studios. He continued his concert career in 1960, playing the music of Lecuona and other Cubans.

In the early 1970s, Rizo worked as the musical director for the Royal Viking Sea cruise ship. Throughout his career, he arranged for hundreds of top artists: Carmen Miranda, Danny Kaye, Xavier Cugat, Yma Sumac, and Paquito D’Rivera, among many others. Some of his most memorable piano and orchestral compositions include Suite campesina, Ñañigo, Danzas cubanas, Jose Martí: Sinfonía cubana, Broadway Concerto, Suite of the Americas, Suite española, and Visions of New York.

== Legacy ==
In the early 1980s, he founded the non-profit organization “The Marco Rizo Latin American Music Project” (SAMPI), which aimed to spread appreciation for Latin music and culture to students in universities, colleges, high schools, and public schools. Among the members of his ensemble who performed with him on a regular basis were noted bassist Victor Venegas, famed drummer Bobby Sanabria, and legendary Havana born conguero and National Endowment of The Arts Jazz Master Candido Camero.

In 1989, Rizo won the Silver Medal of the French Academy of the Arts, Sciences and Letters.

He died of a heart attack in 1998 at St. Luke's-Roosevelt Hospital Center. His sister, Vilma Rizo, donated many of his papers, files, and compositions to the Music Division at the New York Public Library for the Performing Arts located at Lincoln Center in New York City. Among the various items in the collection is an unpublished biography that Rizo wrote of his longtime friend Desi Arnaz entitled “The Desi I Knew” (1991).

== Sources/External links ==
- Marco Rizo at AllMusic
- Marco Rizo.com
- Finding Aid for Marco Rizo Papers in the Music Division of The New York Public Library for the Performing Arts
- Marco Rizo at IMDb
