= My Favorite Husband =

American radio program and network television series

Lucille Ball and Richard Denning performing an episode of My Favorite Husband

My Favorite Husband is an American radio program and network television show. The original radio show, starring Lucille Ball, shaped into the famous sitcom I Love Lucy. The series was based on the novels Mr. and Mrs. Cugat, the Record of a Happy Marriage (1940) and Outside Eden (1945) written by Isabel Scott Rorick, the earlier of which had previously been adapted into the Paramount Pictures feature film Are Husbands Necessary? (1942) co-starring Ray Milland and Betty Field.

== Radio ==
My Favorite Husband was broadcast on KFI radio in Hollywood, California, on July 8, 1947, as an episode of the Premiere Performance series, which provided opportunities for program packagers to air pilots of potential series. John Beal portrayed George Cugat, and Nancy Kelly played his wife. A review in the trade publication Billboard found the broadcast to be "nothing more than a tired rehash of the now-familiar pattern set by Claudia and David stage and movie series".

Its first network broadcast was a one-time special on CBS Radio on July 5, 1948. CBS's new series Our Miss Brooks had been delayed coming to the air, so to fill in the gap that week CBS aired the audition program (the radio equivalent of a television pilot) for My Favorite Husband. Lucille Ball and Lee Bowman played the characters of Liz and George Cugat, and a positive response to this broadcast convinced CBS to launch My Favorite Husband as a series. Bowman was not available to do the series, so when it debuted later that month it starred Lucille Ball and Richard Denning as the leads. The couple lived at 321 Bundy Drive in the fictitious city of Sheridan Falls, and were billed as "two people who live together and like it."

The episode would feature a minor crisis or problem, typically caused by one of Liz's funny ideas; the resolution of the problem filled the rest of the time. Each episode would end with Liz saying, "Thanks, George. You're my favorite husband."

Beginning with the 26th episode, on January 7, 1949, the last name of Lucille Ball's character was changed to Cooper. On this same episode the series, which had begun as a sustaining program, acquired Jell-O as its sponsor. An average of three "plugs" for Jell-O would be made in each episode. The first sponsored episode, titled "Over Budget Beans," opened with:

Bob LeMond: It's time for My Favorite Husband starring Lucille Ball!
Lucille Ball: Jell-O, everybody!
Theme music [composed by Marlin Skiles, conducted by Wilbur Hatch]
LeMond: Yes, it's the new gay family series starring Lucille Ball with Richard Denning, brought to you by the Jell-O family of desserts:
Singers:

J-E-L-L-
O! The big red letters stand for the Jell-O family,
Oh, the big red letters stand for the Jell-O family,
That's Jell-O!
Yum, yum, yum!
Jell-O pudding!
Yum, yum, yum!
Jell-O tapioca pudding, yes sir-ee!

LeMond: And now, Lucille Ball with Richard Denning as Liz and George Cooper, two people who live together and like it.

A total of 124 episodes of the program aired from July 23, 1948, through March 31, 1951. It was initially written by Frank Fox and Bill Davenport, who were the writers for radio's Ozzie and Harriet. The show portrayed the Cugats as a well-to-do banker and his socially prominent wife. That fall, after about ten episodes had been written, Fox and Davenport departed and three new writers took over – Bob Carroll Jr., Madelyn Pugh, and head writer/producer/director Jess Oppenheimer. They subsequently changed the couple's name to Cooper and remade them into a middle-class couple, which they thought average listeners would find more accessible. In March 1949, Gale Gordon took over the existing role of George's boss, Rudolph Atterbury, and Bea Benaderet was added as his wife, Iris.

One discovery made during the run of the show was that Lucille Ball performed comedy far better when she played to an audience.

=== Characters ===
- Liz Cooper, played by Lucille Ball; happily married and slightly zany housewife
- George Cooper, played by Richard Denning; Liz's husband, works for Mr. Atterbury
- Mr. Rudolph Atterbury, played first by Hans Conried and then Joseph Kearns, and in subsequent episodes by Gale Gordon; George's boss, friend of the Cooper family, often refers to George as "boy," as in "George-Boy"
- Mrs. Iris Atterbury, played by Bea Benaderet; wife of Rudolph and friend of the Cooper family, often refers to Liz as "girl," as in "Liz-Girl"
- Katy, played by Ruth Perrott; the Coopers' maid
- Mrs. Leticia Cooper, played first by Benaderet and in subsequent episodes by Eleanor Audley; George's aristocratic mother, who typically looks down on Liz

In 1950, Lucille Ball was asked to do a television version of the show, and CBS and Jell-O both insisted that Richard Denning continue as her co-star. Ball refused to do it without real-life husband Desi Arnaz playing her on-screen husband. The network reluctantly agreed, and the concept was reworked into I Love Lucy after Ball and Arnaz took a show on the road to convince the network that audiences would respond. Jell-O dropped out and Philip Morris became the television sponsor. Gale Gordon and Bea Benaderet, who played the Atterburys, were both given first consideration for the roles that would become Fred and Ethel Mertz on I Love Lucy, but both had contract conflicts that forced them to turn down the roles.

Writers Bob Carroll Jr., Madelyn Pugh Davis and Jess Oppenheimer all agreed to continue with I Love Lucy. They subsequently reworked numerous My Favorite Husband episodes into I Love Lucy episodes early in the TV show's run. For example, the March 18, 1949, radio episode titled "Giveaway Program" inspired the November 24, 1952, I Love Lucy episode "Redecorating". Many of the actors who appeared on My Favorite Husband on radio later appeared on I Love Lucy, often in episodes where they reprised their original roles from a reworked My Favorite Husband script. During the first season of I Love Lucy Gale Gordon twice played the role of the boss, and the May 26, 1952, episode titled "Lucy's Schedule" was a rewrite of the April 22, 1949, My Favorite Husband episode "Time Schedule" (also called "Budgeting Time".)

=== Critical reception ===
A review of the July 5, 1948 audition episode in the trade publication Variety was very positive. It praised the show's "adult, smart scripting that never plays down to its audience." However it also noted that the show's current writers would depart after the summer run, and "That's when the real test for Favorite Husband will come". A later review of the January 7, 1949, episode stated that the program had "gone a little pat", describing the content as "a little pedestrian and synthetic." It noted that part of the content was amusing but said "dialog strained a little too much for effect and laughs", concluding, "Some of the gags were funny; some pretty drab."

== Television ==
CBS brought My Favorite Husband to television in 1953, starring Joan Caulfield and Barry Nelson as Liz and George Cooper. The couple now resembled their earliest radio version, with George Cooper a well-to-do bank executive and with plots dealing with the couple's society life. The television version ran two-and-a-half seasons, from September 1953 through December 1955. Reruns of the series were broadcast during summer 1957. The show was produced live at CBS Television City for most of its run, until switching to film for a truncated third season, filmed at Desilu and recasting Liz Cooper with Vanessa Brown.

=== Characters ===
- Liz Cooper – the housewife
- George Cooper – Liz's favorite husband, and bank executive
- Gilmore Cobb – played by Bob Sweeney; the Coopers' wealthy next-door neighbor (first two seasons)
- Myra Cobb – played by Alix Talton, Gilmore's social-climbing wife (first two seasons)
- Oliver Shepard – played by Dan Tobin, the Coopers' neighbor in the third season
- Myra Shepard – Oliver's wife (third season), played by Alix Talton, the same actress who earlier played Myra Cobb

== Home media ==
Though the radio show was never commercially released on its own CD or DVD collections, at least one episode can be found on each disk from the I Love Lucy DVD releases. In 2003, two episodes were released together on a CD in the UK.

These radio episodes may be in the public domain, and CDs containing the entire run of My Favorite Husband in the MP3 format are offered by several private vendors through eBay and other sites, such as the Internet Archive.

== Dramatizations ==
In July 2018, I Love Lucy: A Funny Thing Happened on the Way to the Sitcom, a comedy play by Gregg Oppenheimer (son of series creator Jess Oppenheimer), had its world premiere in a Los Angeles production by L.A. Theatre Works. The play goes behind the scenes to trace how My Favorite Husband turned into I Love Lucy. Recorded before a live audience at UCLA's James Bridges Theater, the production has been broadcast on public radio and released on audio CD and as a downloadable MP3. The performance starred Sarah Drew as Lucille Ball, Oscar Nunez as Desi Arnaz, and Seamus Dever as Jess Oppenheimer, and featured Matthew Floyd Miller as Richard Denning and Lucy's radio announcer, Bob LeMond.

== Sources ==
- Brooks, Tim and Marsh, Earle. The Complete Directory to Prime Time Network and Cable TV Shows (ninth edition), ISBN 978-0345497734
- Lance, Steven. Written Out of Television: A TV Lover's Guide to Cast Changes 1945–1994, ISBN 1568330715
- Andrews, Bart. The "I Love Lucy" Book, ISBN 0385190336
