= Bob Carroll Jr. =

American television writer (1918–2007)

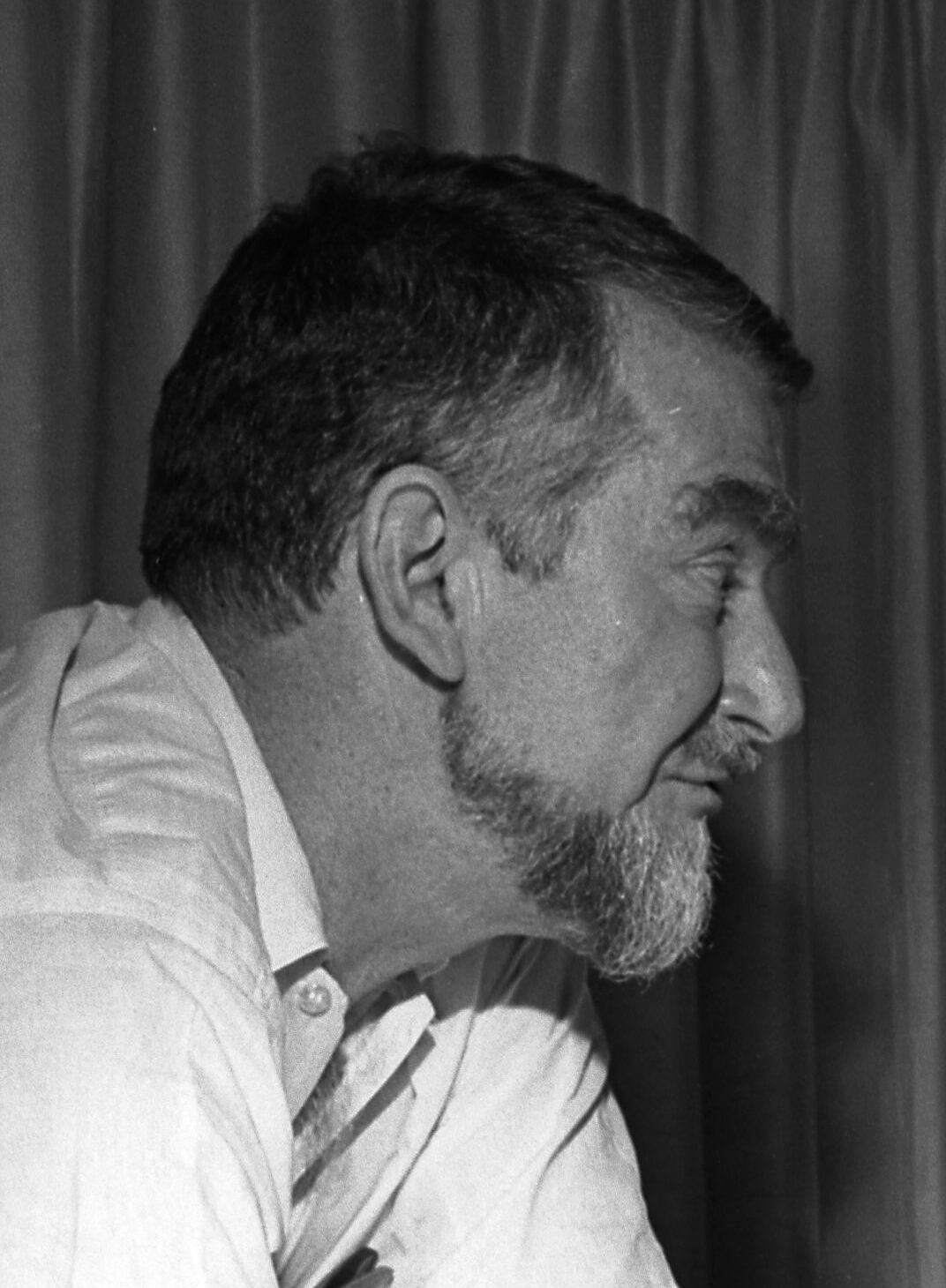
- Bob Carroll Jr. in 1966
- Born: Robert Gordon Carroll; August 12, 1918; McKeesport, Pennsylvania, U.S.
- Died: January 27, 2007 (aged 88); Los Angeles, California, U.S.
- Education: St. Petersburg College
- Occupation: Television writer
- Years active: 1940–2005
- Spouse: 2 (divorced)
- Children: Christina Carroll

Robert Gordon Carroll Jr. (August 12, 1918 – January 27, 2007) was an American television writer notable for his creative role in the series I Love Lucy, the first four seasons of which he wrote with his professional partner Madelyn Pugh, and collaborator Jess Oppenheimer.

== Biography ==
=== Early life and career ===
Born in McKeesport, Pennsylvania, Carroll's family moved to Florida when he was three years old. His father made a living buying and selling real estate in the Florida land boom of the 1920s. The family also moved to California for a time in conjunction with Carroll Sr.'s work, but eventually settled back in St. Petersburg, Florida.

He attended St. Petersburg Junior College (now St. Petersburg College), where he studied French. He became a writer by happenstance. In 1940, he broke his hip in an accident. While he was recovering from his injury, he heard about a script writing contest being sponsored by local radio station WSUN. With plenty of time on his hands, the 21-year-old decided to try writing a radio script, which ended up winning the station's $10 prize.

=== Hollywood years ===
Concerned that he might never work, due to his injury, Carroll felt very fortunate when his brother-in-law helped him get a job as the front desk clerk for CBS Radio in Hollywood, California. There, Carroll got a kick out of making celebrities sign in. He eventually worked his way up into the publicity department and moved from there to assignments as a junior and eventually senior writer.

There Carroll was teamed with fellow staffer Madelyn Pugh. The two created a partnership that lasted more than 50 years, and together wrote approximately 400 television episodes and 500 radio episodes. Though they briefly dated, they married other people.

While writing for Steve Allen's early local radio program on CBS Radio station KNX in Los Angeles the duo became interested in writing for Lucille Ball's new radio series My Favorite Husband. In an effort to seize that opportunity, they paid Allen to write his own show one week so that they could focus their energies on creating a script submission for My Favorite Husband. Successful, the pair wrote for Ball's popular program for its 2½-year duration.

Carroll and Pugh helped develop and create a vaudeville act for Lucille Ball and her husband, Desi Arnaz, which became the basis for the pilot episode of the I Love Lucy series. Together the team tackled 39 episodes per season for the run of the show. Pugh and Carroll were nominated for three Emmys for their work on it; that total would likely have been considerably higher, but the academy did not award Emmys to writers until 1954. The pair also wrote episodes of Ball's subsequent series, The Lucy Desi Comedy Hour, The Lucy Show, Here's Lucy, and, in 1986, her final sitcom, Life with Lucy.

=== Later career ===
The duo's non-Lucy credits include work on the television series The Tom Ewell Show, The Paul Lynde Show, Dorothy, Those Whiting Girls and Kocham Klane. They created and wrote the successful Desilu series The Mothers-in-Law, which starred Lucille Ball's longtime MGM pals Eve Arden and Kaye Ballard. Carroll and Pugh served as executive producers and did some writing for the hit television series Alice, starring Linda Lavin, for which the duo won a Golden Globe Award. They also wrote the story basis for the film Yours, Mine and Ours (1968).

In a 2005 interview with the St. Petersburg Times, Carroll discussed the fact that he and his writing partner Pugh did not receive any compensation for the I Love Lucy re-runs, as would be standard for writers today. He did, however, keep his sense of humor over the situation telling a reporter: "Do you think I'd be sitting here if I'd had residuals? I'd have flown you down to Cuba for this interview if I had."

He co-authored Madelyn Pugh Davis' memoir, Laughing with Lucy, published in September 2005.

Carroll died in Los Angeles after a brief illness. Divorced twice, he was survived by a daughter, Christina Carroll, of Los Angeles.

== Portrayal in popular media ==
Carroll was portrayed by Jake Lacy (young Bob) and Ronny Cox (older Bob) in Being the Ricardos, the 2021 film written and directed by Aaron Sorkin.

== Bibliography ==
- Pugh Davis, Madelyn; Bob Carroll Jr. (1 September 2005). Laughing with Lucy: My Life with America's Leading Lady of Comedy. Emmis Book. ISBN 1-57860-247-5.

== Awards ==
- Golden Globe for Alice
- Writers' Guild of America Paddy Chayefsky Laurel Award for Television Achievement (1992)
- Distinguished Alumni Award, St. Petersburg College (2005)
