= Ethel Mertz =

Fictional character

Ethel Mae Mertz (née Potter) (alternately Ethel Louise, Ethel May, and Ethel Roberta), played by Vivian Vance, is one of the four main fictional characters in the highly popular 1950s American television sitcom I Love Lucy. Ethel is the middle-aged landlady of the main character, Lucy Ricardo, played by Lucille Ball. Ethel is married to Fred Mertz, played by William Frawley, with whom she had a career in vaudeville years earlier. The two female characters are close friends, habitually scheming together; Ethel is generally the voice of reason as a counterpart to Lucy's harebrained ideas.

== Background ==
Ethel was born in Albuquerque, New Mexico, where her father, Will Potter, owned a sweet shop and soda fountain with the slogan "You can lick our cones, but you can't beat our sodas!". Ethel went on to a career in music and acting, yet got her start at Albuquerque's Little Theater, singing her signature number "Shortnin' Bread".

Although Ethel's mother is apparently alive and well during the first season, viewers never meet Mrs. Potter. A flapper in the 1920s, Ethel eloped and married Fred Mertz on May 3 in either 1933 or 1927; the length of their marriage changed during the series.

Ethel worked in vaudeville with Fred before settling down and purchasing their own brownstone apartment building in New York City, containing the apartment they rent to Ricky and Lucy Ricardo, though it is stated that the building is solely in Ethel's name. Some of Ricky's shows have included Ethel and/or Fred in the production, with the effect of making Lucy determined to get in on the act.

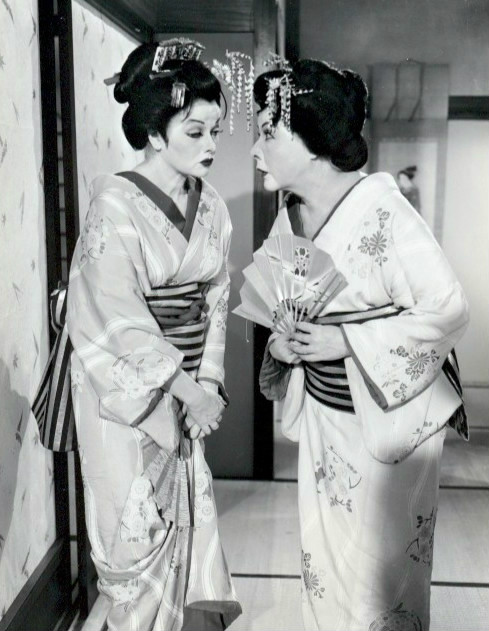
When the Ricardos and Mertzes go to Japan in a 1959 episode of The Lucy–Desi Comedy Hour, Lucy and Ethel dress as geishas to try to correct a mix-up between a strand of real pearls and some fake ones.

In appearance blonde and supposedly a beauty in her youth, Ethel is unsentimental yet warm, proud, and extremely loyal, with her tendency to be sharp-tongued leading to moments of hilarity. She has a fine soprano voice, among other artistic talents, but unlike Lucy, is now unambitious and content as a housewife and landlady.

Somewhat lonely, she is devoted to Lucy and her family. Despite her common sense, she is often fascinated by the possibilities for excitement opened up by Lucy's mad schemes. Although continually complaining about Fred's penny-pinching and other faults, she defers to him far more than Lucy does to Ricky. Something of a gossip and an inveterate snoop, she often tries to read Lucy's mail, especially postcards, which she claims are fair game. At times slightly vain, as in one episode when a concert in New Mexico goes to her head, she has a thicker skin than Lucy and seldom takes offense. She is easily able to parry Fred's frequent disparaging remarks.

Ethel and Lucy, although landlady and tenant, are the best of friends, gossiping and supporting each other during difficult times. They are seen entering several business ventures together, including owning and running a dress shop and a diner, and marketing a homemade salad dressing. Though not afraid to be critical of Lucy, especially when Lucy's schemes create trouble for others, Ethel will always bail out her friend.

Occasional episodes of competition occur between them, mostly in relation to show business. When they are in competition for the same part, Ethel, having actual experience, always has the edge over Lucy, which in turn leads Lucy to mention Ethel's greater age and weight. Despite their spats, they always make up again by the end of the show. Lucy relies a great deal on her friend's more practical nature and calmer disposition.

Along with Lucy's husband Ricky and her own husband, Fred, Ethel travels to many places in the United States and Europe, such as England, France, Italy, and Switzerland. They are a childless couple. Fred and Ethel eventually move to Connecticut with the Ricardos and live in their guest house to help them raise chickens and sell their eggs for profit; they also appear regularly on The Lucy–Desi Comedy Hour.

== After I Love Lucy ==
Vivian Vance portrayed Lucille Ball's best friend in a recurring role on each of her next two sitcoms, The Lucy Show and Here's Lucy. In both sitcoms, Vance insisted her character's name also be Vivian, as she was reportedly tired of being identified as "Ethel" when spotted on the street.

== Reception ==
According to Entertainment Weekly, she is one of the "greatest sidekicks".
