= Madelyn Pugh =

American screenwriter (1921–2011)

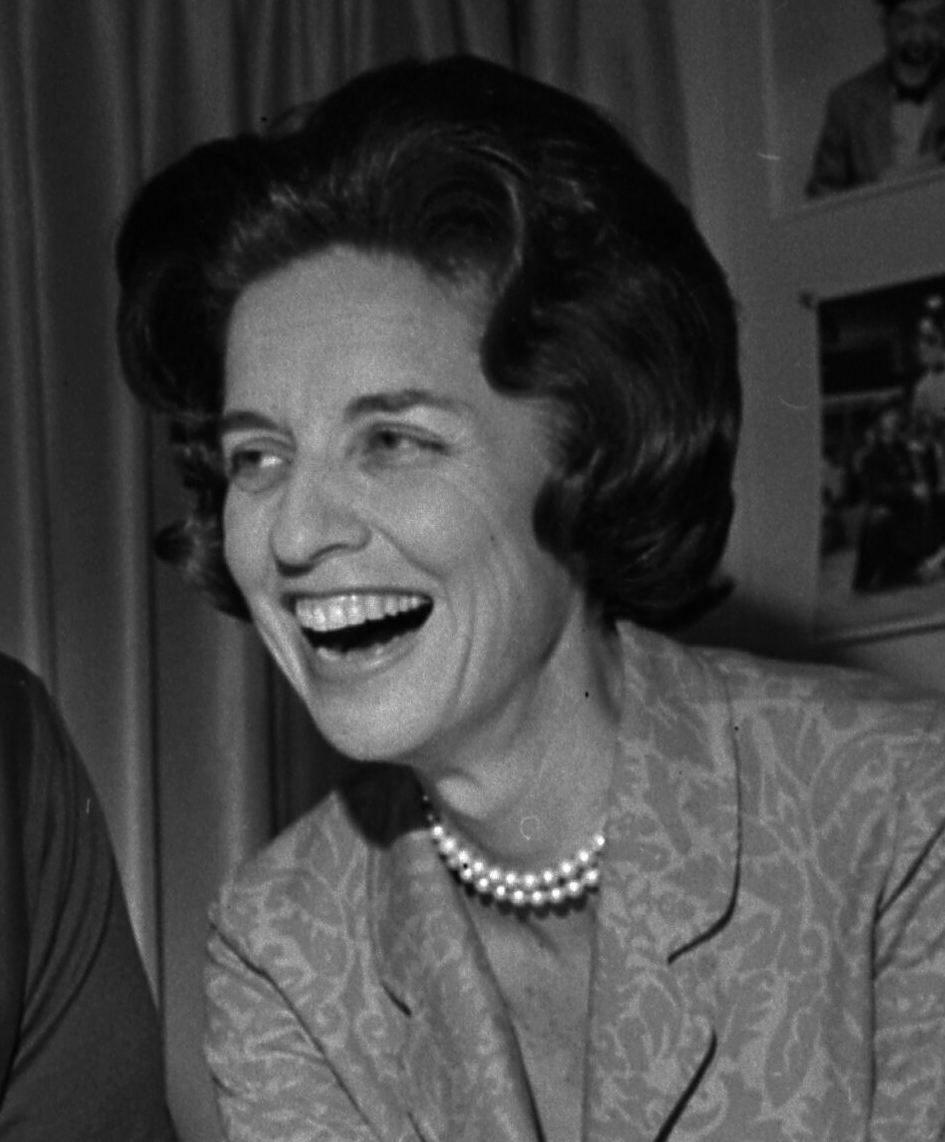
- Pugh in 1966
- Born: March 15, 1921; Indianapolis, Indiana, U.S.
- Died: April 20, 2011 (aged 90); Bel Air, California, U.S.
- Occupations: Television producer and writer
- Years active: 1951–2009
- Spouses: Quinn Martin (m. 1955; div. 1960) Richard Davis (m. 1964; died 2009)
- Children: 1 (with Martin)

Madelyn Pugh (March 15, 1921 – April 20, 2011), sometimes credited as Madelyn Pugh Davis, Madelyn Davis, or Madelyn Martin, was an American television writer who became known in the 1950s for her work on the I Love Lucy television series.

== Early life and education ==
Pugh was born in Indianapolis, Indiana, to I. Watt Pugh, a bank treasurer, and Louise Huff Pugh. She had two older sisters, Audrey and Rosalind.

During her senior year at Shortridge High School, she was co-editor of the high school newspaper, along with her classmate Kurt Vonnegut. She graduated in 1938, two years before Vonnegut.

In 1942, she graduated from Indiana University Bloomington's School of Journalism.

== Career ==
Pugh became interested in writing while serving as Friday editor of the Shortridge High School daily newspaper in Indianapolis, Indiana with classmate Kurt Vonnegut. At Shortridge she also served as vice president of her senior class. Her first professional writing job was writing short radio spots for WIRE, an Indianapolis radio station.

When her family moved to California, she got work as a radio writer, first for NBC and then CBS, where she met Bob Carroll. Pugh credits some of her breakthrough as "the girl writer" to the war effort, which limited the pool of qualified male writers; she was frequently the only female writer on staff.

Early in her career, as a staff writer for CBS Radio in Hollywood, Pugh forged a partnership with Bob Carroll Jr. which lasted more than 50 years. Together they wrote some 400 television programs and roughly 500 radio shows. While the team was writing for The Steve Allen Show, they became interested in writing for Lucille Ball's new radio show, My Favorite Husband. They paid Allen to write his own show one week so they could focus on creating a script submission for My Favorite Husband. Under the supervision of head writer Jess Oppenheimer, the pair wrote Ball's radio program for its 2½ years.

Pugh and Carroll helped create a vaudeville act for Lucille Ball and her husband Desi Arnaz, which became the basis for the pilot episode of I Love Lucy. Together with Oppenheimer and/or Bob Schiller and Bob Weiskopf, who joined the show at the beginning of the fifth year, the team tackled 39 episodes per season for the run of the series. Although they never won, Pugh and Carroll were nominated for three Emmy Awards for their work on the series.

Pugh and Carroll are credited with helping create the 'Lucy' character, which Ball played in one form or another for over 40 years. The pair also wrote episodes for The Lucy Show, Here's Lucy, The Lucille Ball-Desi Arnaz Show (aka The Lucy-Desi Comedy Hour) and Ball's final series, Life with Lucy (1986).

The pair's other writing credits include work on the television series The Jane Wyman Show, The Paul Lynde Show, Dorothy, Those Whiting Girls, Kocham Klane (an I Love Lucy series remake in Poland) and The Tom Ewell Show. They also worked on the films Forever, Darling and Yours, Mine and Ours, starring Ball. They created and wrote the Desi Arnaz Productions series The Mothers-in-Law (filmed at Desilu), which starred actresses Kaye Ballard and Eve Arden. The two served for seven years as executive producers of the long-running television series Alice and occasionally contributed scripts, one of which was awarded a Golden Globe Award.

In September 2005, Madelyn Pugh Davis, who lived in California, released her memoirs, titled Laughing with Lucy, written with Bob Carroll Jr.

== Personal life and death ==
Pugh was married twice, first to TV producer Quinn Martin on December 24, 1955, in Los Angeles, until their 1960 divorce. They had a son. She married Richard Merrill Davis in 1964, and they remained married until his death in 2009.

Cover of Laughing with Lucy

Pugh Davis died on April 20, 2011, aged 90, in Bel Air, California.

== Works and publications ==
- Davis, Madelyn Pugh; Carroll, Jr., Bob (2005). Laughing with Lucy: My Life with America's Leading Lady of Comedy. Cincinnati, OH: Emmis Books. ISBN 978-1-578-60247-6. OCLC 1245315312.

== Portrayal in popular media ==
Pugh was played by Alia Shawkat (younger) and Linda Lavin (older) in Being the Ricardos, a 2021 film written and directed by Aaron Sorkin.

== Awards ==
=== Madelyn Pugh Davis and Bob Carroll Jr. ===
- 1955, Emmy nomination for comedy writing, I Love Lucy
- 1970, Emmy nomination for "Lucy Meets the Burtons" episode, Here's Lucy
- 1979, Golden Globe as Producers for Alice
- 1990, Television Academy Hall of Fame award, I Love Lucy
- 1992, Writers' Guild of America Paddy Chayefsky Laurel Award for Television Achievement
- 1999, "Loving Lucy" award, Lucy Convention
- 2001, UCLA Lifetime Achievement award

=== Madelyn Pugh Davis ===
- 1957, Los Angeles Times Times Woman of the Year Award
- 1957, Women in Communications award
- 1960, Kappa Kappa Gamma Outstanding Alumni award
- 1972, Indiana University Distinguished Alumni award
- 1996, Women in Film Lucy Award
- 1998, Indiana Broadcasters Award
- 2006, Paley Center for Media "She Made It!" honoree
