= Fred Mertz =

Fictional character

Fred Hobart Mertz, played by William Frawley, is a fictional character in the 1950s American sitcom I Love Lucy. He is an aging, grumpy man who is Lucy's downstairs neighbor. Frawley was cast in the role at the age of 64.

== Character ==
Fred was born and raised on a farm in the Midwest; in one episode, Ethel says that Fred's mother comes to visit once a year from Indiana. Fred is of German descent and has at least one brother. He toured the country in vaudeville before retiring to New York City.

He is a World War I veteran and is married to Ethel (Vivian Vance), and they often make fun of each other. Their wedding anniversary is May 3. Ethel often calls Fred a "fat old goat", and in return, Fred calls Ethel the "bottomless pit" due to her voracious appetite. Having been "wiped out" in the Great Depression, he is a penny pincher and gives Ethel very little money. Nevertheless, Fred always has the money when an investment opportunity comes along (e.g., diner purchase, oil stocks).

As a young man, Fred was in vaudeville with his friend Barney Kurtz, as the duo of "Mertz and Kurtz", known for "tap dancing, soft shoe and smart quips". Later, Fred continued in vaudeville with his wife, the former Ethel Potter. It is mentioned that he was once a Golden Gloves boxer, and Fred wears a sweater from Golden Gloves 1909 in one episode.

Eventually, Fred and Ethel retired from show business and bought a brownstone apartment building in New York City. In the early 1940s, Lucy and Ricky moved into the brownstone, and Fred, Ethel, Lucy, and Ricky quickly develop their friendship (the date of the Ricardos' tenancy changed during the duration of the series), with Fred and Ricky becoming best friends, and Lucy and Ethel doing the same. Despite being retired from show business, Fred and Ethel guest on Ricky's show, if asked.

When Ricky does something to upset Lucy, she plots revenge and drags Ethel into her plan, often against her will. Ethel often tells Fred, who tells Ricky, and the two come up with their own plan to get even with their wives. Occasionally, it is Ethel who is away and Fred who is dragged into Lucy's scheme. Usually, Fred expresses his exasperation with a phrase: "Oh, for corn's sake."

The Fred Mertz character, the actor who portrayed him (William Frawley), and some of their costumes are memorialized in the Lucille Ball-Desi Arnaz Center in Jamestown, New York (Lucille Ball's real-life hometown).

== Popular references ==
Fred was referenced in "The Apartment", a Season 2 episode of Seinfeld, when Jerry Seinfeld felt insecure about a loud neighbor living above him.

Fred and Ethel is referenced in "West Wing (S2, E11, The Leadership Breakfast)" by CJ at 35:29 when she calls Sam and Josh as 'Fred & Ethel'.

Fred was referenced in episode 10 of Mission Hill when Andy, Jim and Posey visit a club called "I Murdered Fred Mertz".
