= Thibodeaux =

Thibodeaux is a Cajun (French) surname. Notable people with the surname include:

- Bannon Goforth Thibodeaux (1812–1866), member of the United States House of Representatives who represented Louisiana, 1845–1849
- Henry S. Thibodaux (1769–1827), former governor of Louisiana
- James C. Thibodeaux (1911–2004), African-American photographer, painter, stage actor, and educator
- Jourdan Thibodeaux (born 1986), American Cajun music fiddler and singer
- Kathy Thibodeaux (born 1956), American ballet dancer and co-founder of Ballet Magnificat!
- Kayvon Thibodeaux (born 2000), American football player
- Keith Thibodeaux (born 1950), actor and musician
- Keith Thibodeaux (American football) (born 1974), American football player in the National Football League who played cornerback
- Rufus Thibodeaux (1934–2005), American Cajun music fiddler
- Seth Thibodeaux, American college baseball coach
- Tony Thibodeaux (1938–2010), American Cajun music fiddler

== In fiction ==
- Hunter Thibodeaux, character in Dead Rising 3 and its expansion missions.

== Other uses ==
- Boudreaux and Thibodeaux, traditional Cajun jokes

== See also ==
- Thibodeau
