= Keith Thibodeaux =

Keith Thibodeaux may refer to:

- Richard Keith (actor) (born Keith Thibodeaux, 1950), American musician and child actor
- Keith Thibodeaux (American football) (born 1974), NFL cornerback

== See also ==
- Thibodeaux (surname)
