= Lucy and Ricky Ricardo =

I Love Lucy characters

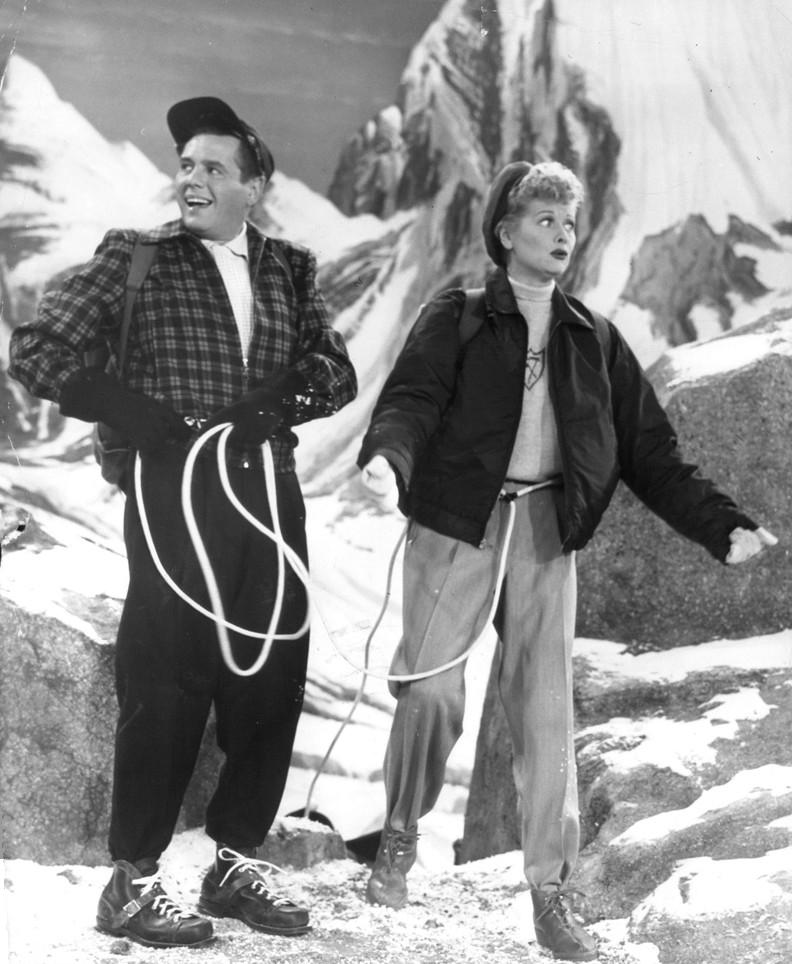
- Lucy and Ricky Ricardo in the Alps on their trip to Europe in season 5, 1956
- First appearance: "The Girls Want to Go to a Nightclub" (1951)
- Last appearance: "Lucy Meets The Mustache" (1960)
- Portrayed by: Lucille Ball as Lucy, Desi Arnaz as Ricky

In-universe information
- Aliases: Lucy: Lucille Esmeralda "Lucy" McGillicuddy Ricardo; Ricky: Enrique "Ricky" Alberto Fernando Ricardo y de Acha III
- Nicknames: Bird Legs, Droopy Drawers, Lucita, Cousin Lucy
- Gender: Female and male
- Title(s): Housewife and band leader
- Occupation: Housewife, Mother, Club Officer, Committee Officer, Chicken Farmer, Girl Friday
- Family: Mrs. McGillicuddy (Lucy's mother)
- Children: Ricky Ricardo Jr. (son; born January 1953)
- Nationality: American (both)

Lucy and Ricky Ricardo, also known simply as Lucy and Ricky or the Ricardos, are fictional characters from the American television sitcom I Love Lucy, portrayed respectively by Lucille Ball and Desi Arnaz. The Ricardos also appear in The Lucy–Desi Comedy Hour, and Lucy also appears in one episode of The Ann Sothern Show.

Together, Lucy and Ricky serve as a double act. Ricky plays a character similar to Arnaz himself; he is a Cuban-American bandleader whose trademark song is "Babalu". Red-haired Lucy is his wife, whose main ambition is to be in show business, but Ricky wants a traditional home life so he prevents Lucy from acting in his show. However, Lucy uses her cleverness to find ways to get on stage and to get her way at home. Their son, Ricky Ricardo Jr. (usually called "Little Ricky"), was born in the middle of the show's second season. He was portrayed by child actor Richard Keith beginning in season 6.

Lucy's full name (Lucille Esmeralda Ricardo née McGillicuddy) is given in the Season 1 episodes "Fred and Ethel Fight" and "The Marriage License," and "The Passports" in Season 5. Ricky gives his full name in the Season 4 episode "Hollywood Anniversary" as Ricardo Alberto Fernando Ricardo y de Acha, but in the Season 6 episode "Lucy Raises Tulips" Lucy calls him "Enrique Alberto Fernando Ricardo y de Acha III".

== Fictional character biographies ==
=== Early lives ===
Much like Lucille Ball herself, Lucy McGillicuddy was born and raised in Jamestown, New York (or West Jamestown as revealed in Season 5), to an American family of Scottish descent. In one episode in which she is asked her birthday, she gives it as August 6 (the same as Ball's), though in typical fashion, she refuses to give the year; in another, where she is forced to tell the truth, she says she is 33 years old. This episode aired during the third season in 1953. This makes her born in the year 1920 (in reality, Ball was born in 1911).

In the episode, her parents are never referred to by name, and only her mother (portrayed by Kathryn Card) is seen over the course of the series. No other family is even mentioned, except for a passing reference to her grandmother being Swedish (Jamestown has a large Swedish community). In the season 5 episode "The Passports", it is established she was born in 1921, therefore is exactly 10 years younger than Ball in real life.

In grammar school, she played a petunia in a recital. In high school, she was involved in the drama program, wherein she studied with Miss Hanna and played Juliet Capulet in Romeo and Juliet. She also played the saxophone in high school (as did the real Lucy), though every song she played sounded like "The Glow-Worm". Lucy also knows how to play the ukulele. She is seen playing a ukulele in episodes "Ricky Loses His Voice", "Don Juan is Shelved", and "Little Ricky Gets Stage Fright".

A reference to Lucille's attendance at an unnamed junior college is made in the episode "Fan Magazine Interview" (1954); Jamestown Community College, the nearest junior college to Lucy's hometown, did not exist until 1950, although a business college and nursing school did exist in the city at the time.

=== Marriage ===
When she was 22, Lucy was set up on a blind date by her friend Marion Strong. Her blind date turned out to be a Cuban conga drummer, Ricky Ricardo. The two fell in love and eventually got married at the Byram River Beagle Club in Connecticut. An alternate scenario given to guest star Hedda Hopper in the Lucy-Desi Comedy Hour episode "Lucy Takes a Cruise to Havana," with Lucy and friend Susie McNamara (Ann Sothern, reprising her role from Private Secretary), is that Lucy met Ricky while vacationing in Cuba in 1940.

On August 5, 1948, Lucy and Ricky moved into an old reconverted brownstone apartment at 623 East 68th Street in the Lenox Hill neighborhood of Manhattan. In reality, this address does not exist (the last numbered building on E 68th Street is 590, so this address would be in the East River). The apartment rented for $105 per month. Their landlords (soon to be best friends) were Fred and Ethel Mertz. Lucy and Ethel quickly became best friends and did Ricky and Fred. Upon moving to the city, Ricky (referred to as Rick by Fred and sometimes by Ethel) ends up getting a job headlining the Tropicana where he and his band are held over indefinitely.

To Lucy, Ricky's career and days seem so much more exciting than her days of cooking, cleaning, and grocery shopping. She desperately wants to be a star and constantly tries to get into Ricky's act. Ricky wants his wife to remain a homemaker. However, in spite of Ricky's reluctance and regular refusal to give her a role, Lucy sometimes finds a way into the show.

=== Birth of Little Ricky ===
In 1952, after going to the doctor complaining of feeling "dauncey" (a word her grandmother made up; Lucy's definition of feeling "dauncey" is when you are not really sick but just feel lousy) and gaining weight, she learns that she is pregnant. It is actually Ethel who first suggests to Lucy she may be expecting, even before Lucy heads out to the doctor. Lucy is excited to tell her husband the news.

The Mertzes learn the news first and are sworn to secrecy. When she was younger, Lucy had envisioned how she would tell her husband they were going to have a baby. She decides to tell Ricky when he comes home for lunch that afternoon. However, with repeated interruptions from the telephone and the Mertzes, she is unable. She tries to tell him down at his club during rehearsals, but is uncomfortable telling him such a personal thing in front of his band, so she runs out crying.

Finally, that evening, while Ricky is performing, Lucy pens a note and passes it to the maître d'hotel. He gives the note to Ricky. Ricky reads the note, which alludes to a wife needing to tell her husband they are having a baby, and requests that he sing a particular song. Ricky, unaware that the "husband" mentioned in the note is himself, wants to bring the expectant couple up on stage to congratulate them. He goes from couple to couple trying to find them. Ricky notices Lucy in the audience, and it occurs to him that Lucy may be the one who is expecting. Lucy nods yes, and Ricky is overcome with emotion. They sing "We're Having a Baby", with Lucille Ball actually breaking down in tears during the scene.

During her pregnancy, Lucy experiences the normal pregnancy woes. She becomes depressed when everyone seems to focus their attention on the impending child and not on Lucy. She cannot decide on a name for the child and is nervous that she will not be a good mother. However, she wants the best for her child and enrolls herself, Ricky, and the Mertzes in elocution lessons to make sure her child learns how to speak properly. Finally, she takes up sculpting so she and Ricky can enrich their child's life with art and music. However, Lucy's show business aspirations never wane. She manages to break into Ricky's barbershop quartet number by firing the man who has the part she wants.

Finally, on January 19, 1953 — the same day she had her real-life son Desi Arnaz Jr. (technically IV) — while husband Ricky is performing a voodoo act at his nightclub, Lucy gives birth to Ricky Ricardo Jr. The Mertzes are named Little Ricky's godparents. Little Ricky grows on a season-by-season basis, and by the sixth season (1957), he has started school and learned to play the drums and speak Spanish.

=== Hollywood ===
In 1954, Ricky is given a role in an upcoming MGM film based on the life of Don Juan. Lucy and the Mertzes follow Ricky on his journey to Hollywood stardom. While in Hollywood, Lucy meets many famous celebrities, including William Holden, Hedda Hopper, Rock Hudson, Cornel Wilde, Harpo Marx, Richard Widmark, Van Johnson and John Wayne. Some of these actors are celebrities that Ricky has already met as a result of his work.

She reports having spotted 99 celebrities while in Hollywood and finally procures an even 100 when she meets Wilde. Lucy is incredibly starstruck and saves anything that had come in contact with a celebrity, such as a can smashed by Cary Grant's left rear wheel. However, she does not just hobnob with celebrities; she also gets a few chances to break into show business herself.

Ricky gets her a small role in a film as a showgirl. Lucy's role requires her to wear a large headdress; she also gets a death scene. However, the headdress proves cumbersome, and her part is downgraded. She eventually ends up as a showgirl who is already dead on a stretcher when the scene begins. Lucy's second foray into show business is when she replaces Johnson's sick redheaded partner in his act at the hotel. She wants to impress her friend Carolyn Appleby and successfully coaxes Johnson give her the job through flattery.

Finally, she has her third shot at stardom when she appears with a Ricky Ricardo dummy at a luncheon for movie executives. Ricky was asked to perform, but he declined in favor of a fishing trip he had planned. Lucy accepted on his behalf and schemed to build a dummy of Ricky and then pretend that he is ill, and she finishes the show herself. Her plan does not go as well as she had hoped, but she is still a success, as the executives think the performance is meant to be a comedy act, and she is offered a contract. However, she declines when she realizes that it would take her away from her husband, son and friends.

=== Europe ===
Soon after returning home from Hollywood, Ricky's band is given a chance to tour around Europe. Fred is recruited as Ricky's band manager and Lucy and Ethel tag along. Lucy misses the boat and has to be lowered to the deck of the cruise ship, the USS Constitution, from a helicopter. They sail across the Atlantic, where Lucy has to settle for being partnered with a young boy to play games on deck but together they win a ping pong trophy. She also manages to get stuck in a porthole.

After landing in England, Lucy gets the chance to perform for and meet Queen Elizabeth. She also participates in a fox hunt and gets to stay at an English estate.

In Paris, she meets Charles Boyer who has been warned by Ricky not to admit who he is because Lucy is so star-struck; Boyer takes his advice when Lucy corners him and claims he is Maurice DuBois, an out-of-work actor. Ricky has feigned jealousy about Lucy's obsession with Charles Boyer so she hires "DuBois" to impersonate Boyer and pitch woo to her in front of Ricky so she can reassure him with her total lack of interest. She coaches "DuBois" on Boyer's "growl" and mannerisms, remaining unaware that he is the real Boyer until Ethel calls her and reveals Ricky and Boyer's trick.

In another episode, Lucy is arrested by French police after inadvertently using counterfeit money. The scene that ensues, after Ricky arrives to bail her out, involves the only-French-speaking Commandante interrogating Lucy by directing questions to his French-and-German-speaking Lieutenant in French, who translates the questions into German and directs them to a drunken German-and-Spanish-speaking prisoner, who translates the questions into Spanish to ask Spanish-and-English-speaking Ricky, who makes the final translation into English for Lucy. Her answers must travel back up the chain to the Commandante.

Also, she stomps on grapes in Turo, a winemaking town in Italy, and wrestles her professional grape-stomping partner in a grape vat.

=== Moving to Connecticut ===
In 1956, Lucy and Ricky decide to move to Connecticut after making a trip there, and Lucy falls in love with the area. Before they move in, though, she tries unsuccessfully to get out of the deal. Soon the Ricardos decide to raise chickens and sell the eggs. To help them with their business, their best friends, Fred Mertz and Ethel Mertz, move into their guest house, as Fred was raised on a farm. Lucy and Ricky also make close friends while in Connecticut, Betty and Ralph Ramsey (the Ricardos' next door neighbors).

== After I Love Lucy ==
I Love Lucy and The Lucy-Desi Comedy Hour concluded in the aftermath of Arnaz and Ball's real-life divorce in 1960, an incident that was not written into the script. The characters remained married to each other at the end of the series' run.

Lucille Ball would go on to perform Lucy Ricardo–inspired characters on her ensuing sitcoms: The Lucy Show, Here's Lucy, and the short-lived Life with Lucy. In each series, the character Ball portrayed (each one named Lucy) was a widow or divorcée. In the mid-1960s, she was involved in a lawsuit against Jess Oppenheimer, the co-creator of I Love Lucy, over the similarities among the separate Lucy characters. The dispute was later settled out of court.

Arnaz only portrayed a similar Ricky Ricardo character once after The Lucy-Desi Comedy Hour ended its run: in a recurring role on The Mothers-in-Law, Arnaz portrayed matador Raphael Delgado, with the same accent and personality as Ricky (as a Desilu production, The Mothers-in-Law used many of the same writers and executive staff as the Lucy shows).

== "Lucy you got some/a lotta splaining to do!" ==
A catchphrase strongly associated with Ricky Ricardo is "Lucy, you got some 'splaining to do" (sometimes "Lucy, you got a lotta splainin to do"), whenever something Lucy had kept a secret from Ricky that turned into a complicated, problematic situation and was finally revealed to him. The line is still often mentioned in articles about I Love Lucy and even printed on official merchandise, despite the fact that Ricky never says this sentence exactly this way.
