= Goldengirl =

1979 film by Joseph Sargent

- Theatrical release poster
- Directed by: Joseph Sargent
- Screenplay by: John Kohn
- Based on: Goldengirl by Peter Lear
- Produced by: Elliott Kastner; Danny O'Donovan
- Starring: James Coburn; Leslie Caron; Robert Culp; Harry Guardino; Curt Jürgens; John Newcombe; Susan Anton
- Cinematography: Stevan Larner
- Edited by: Harry Keramidas
- Music by: Bill Conti
- Color process: Eastmancolor
- Production company: Backstage Productions
- Distributed by: AVCO Embassy Pictures
- Release date: June 15, 1979
- Running time: 105 minutes
- Country: United States
- Language: English
- Budget: $7 million
- Box office: $3 million (US rentals)

Goldengirl is a 1979 American drama sci-fi sports film directed by Joseph Sargent, based on the 1977 science fiction novel of the same title by Peter Lear, a pseudonym of Peter Lovesey. The screenplay was by John Kohn, with music by Bill Conti. The film is the screen debut of Susan Anton, who starred in the title role of Goldine Serafin opposite James Coburn.

== Plot ==
Scientist and neo-Nazi doctor William Serafin has developed a way to create a physically superior human being. He tests it out on his adopted daughter, Goldine. From childhood, Serafin has injected Goldine with vitamins and hormones. Now that she is grown, it is time to give her a test run. Serafin declares that his "Goldengirl" will enter and win three races at the 1980 Summer Olympics in Moscow.

To subsidize his work, Serafin sells shares in Goldine's future to a syndicate of businessmen, who send merchandising expert Dryden to look out for their interests. Goldine's personal and emotional development, meanwhile, is left in the hands of a psychologist, Dr. Sammy Lee. Goldine competes in Moscow, with unexpected results.

== Cast ==
- James Coburn as Jack Dryden
- Susan Anton as Goldine Serafin
- Curt Jürgens as Dr. William Serafin
- Harry Guardino as Valenti
- Ward Costello as Cobb
- Michael Lerner as Stenberg
- Leslie Caron as Dr. Sammy Lee
- James A. Watson Jr. as Pete Winters
- John Newcombe as Armitage
- Julianna Fjeld as Ingrid
- Robert Culp as Steve Esselton
- Nicolas Coster as Dr. Dalton
- Sheila Wills as Jackson
- Annette Tannader as Ursula Krull
- Mischa Hausserman as Pilot
- Tony Brande as Vince
- Michelle Hooper as Muratova
- Geoff Vanderstock as Starter #1
- Ben Pollock as Starter #2
- Nazaret Khodiquian as Starter #3
- Elliott Mason as Makepeace
- Jenny Sullivan as Dr. Walsh
- Karen Werner as Kansas Girl
- Andrea Brown as Teammate
- Casey MacDonald as Reporter
- Theresa Aldrich as Reporter
- Gilbert Green as Dr. Hatrwig
- Darren Dublin as Reporter
- Joyce Danelen as Reporter
- Gil Smith as Reporter
- Bob Beamon as Colorman
- Dwight Stones as Philip

== Production ==
Susan Anton was a winner of Miss California and second runner-up in the 1969 Miss America pageant. She was best known for starring and singing in TV commercials for Muriel Cigars. Olympic track-and-field stars Dwight Stones and Bob Beamon make cameo appearances in the film, as does Australian tennis player John Newcombe.

The film raised two-thirds of its $7 million budget by pre-selling the TV rights; NBC planned to broadcast an expanded 184-minute, two-part miniseries version that would air in conjunction with the network's exclusive coverage of the 1980 Moscow Olympics. After US participation was canceled in protest of the Soviet invasion of Afghanistan, NBC postponed the broadcast until January 8, 1981 when it aired a 117-minute version in a three-hour timeslot.

== Reception ==
Vincent Canby of The New York Times, called the film "a very intelligent movie of its kind, written and directed in the same brisk style that marked Mr. Sargent's earlier Colossus: The Forbin Project," as well as "a wittily conceived and executed movie that, with the straightest of faces, manage to satirize the kind of big business that surrounds so-called amateur sports today." A review in Variety said, "Goldengirl is amusingly poor ... Central fault to film is Anton's character, who seems to alternate between robot, country girl and schizophrenic. Her screen debut is at best, forgettable, with Anton doing little to clear up the mystifying script." Gene Siskel of the Chicago Tribune gave the film 1 star out of 4 and wrote, "The idea isn't a bad one; it's even plausible. But the script is laughable. The doctor and businessman are fearful, cartoon figures; they never are particularly slick or menacing. Only James Coburn as an advertising agent brings any credibility to a role. And this is not accomplished by anything written for Coburn; he simply earns our good will through his infectious smile." Kevin Thomas of the Los Angeles Times wrote that the film "starts out promisingly enough but falls apart halfway through ... The film is extremely uneven, achieving a punchy scene here and there only to have its effect nullified by an unintentionally funny line of dialogue or an inconsistent characterization." Gary Arnold of The Washington Post wrote that "the continuity is so punchy that one can't be certain what the filmmakers wanted the story to mean. The smartest lines and most effective situations suggest an entertaining polemic about unscrupulous, ruinous exploitation. But the concept seems to have been victimized by a combination of cold feet, cross-purposes and desperate last-minute editing, which eliminated substantial pieces of exposition along with one major player, Jessica Walter, who is still listed in the credits." Jack Kroll wrote in Newsweek, "Goldengirl fumbles a good story idea, or several good story ideas ... A film that might have had the excitement of Olympic competition and the fun of clever science-fiction founders in dump scenes, Joseph Sargent's heavy-handed direction and some awkward editing which apparently eliminated a pivotal scene showing Serafin's background in Nazi-like medical experimentation."

The film was a box office flop, earning $3 million in North American rentals against a $7 million budget.

Anton was nominated for a Golden Globe Award for New Star of the Year in a Motion Picture—Female at the 38th Golden Globe Awards.

== See also ==
- The Bionic Woman, a 1976–1978 television series
- List of films about the sport of athletics
