= Bryce Drew =

American basketball player and coach (born 1974)

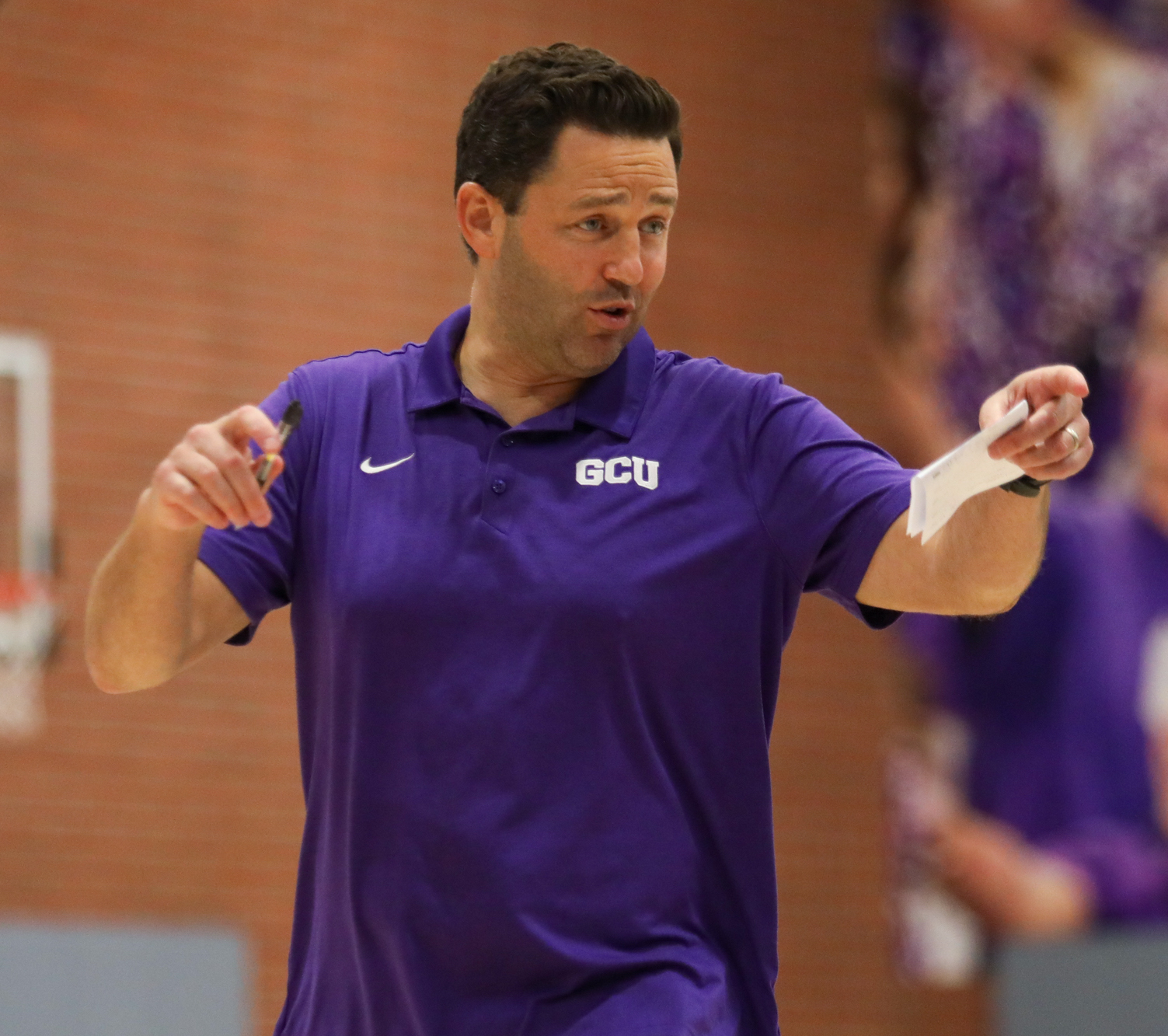
- Drew at GCU practice in 2021

Grand Canyon Antelopes
- Title: Head coach
- League: Mountain West Conference

Personal information
- Born: September 21, 1974 (age 52) Baton Rouge, Louisiana, U.S.
- Listed height: 6 ft 3 in (1.91 m)
- Listed weight: 183 lb (83 kg)

Career information
- High school: Valparaiso (Valparaiso, Indiana)
- College: Valparaiso (1994–1998)
- NBA draft: 1998: 1st round, 16th overall pick
- Drafted by: Houston Rockets
- Playing career: 1998–2004
- Position: Point guard
- Number: 11, 24, 17
- Coaching career: 2005–present

Career history

Playing
- 1998–2000: Houston Rockets
- 2000–2001: Chicago Bulls
- 2001–2002: Charlotte Hornets
- 2002–2004: New Orleans Hornets
- 2004: Viola Reggio Calabria
- 2004–2005: Valencia Basket

Coaching
- 2005–2006: Valparaiso (assistant)
- 2006–2011: Valparaiso (associate HC)
- 2011–2016: Valparaiso
- 2016–2019: Vanderbilt
- 2020–present: Grand Canyon

Career highlights
- As player: 2× MCC Player of the Year (1997, 1998); 3× First-team All-MCC (1996–1998); 3× MCC tournament MVP (1995, 1996, 1998); No. 24 jersey retired by Valparaiso Beacons; Indiana Mr. Basketball (1994); As coach: 2× Horizon League tournament champion (2013, 2015); 4× Horizon League regular season champion (2012, 2013, 2015, 2016); 4× WAC tournament champion (2021, 2023–2025); 2× WAC regular season champion (2021, 2024); 3× Horizon League Coach of the Year (2012, 2015, 2016)
- Stats at NBA.com
- Stats at Basketball Reference
Medals
Men's basketball
Representing USA
Summer Universiade
Gold medal – first place	1997 Trapani	Team competition

Bryce Homer Drew (born September 21, 1974) is an American college basketball coach and former player who is the head coach at Grand Canyon University. Previously, he served as the head coach at Vanderbilt and in the same capacity at his alma mater, Valparaiso, having succeeded his father, Homer Drew. Drew has led his teams to the NCAA tournament on six occasions, including at least once at each of the three schools where he has been the head coach.

Bryce's older brother, Scott, also coached at Valpo before becoming the head coach of the Baylor Bears. As a player, Bryce Drew was known for his buzzer-beating shot in the first round of Valparaiso's run in the 1998 NCAA tournament. He went on to play six seasons in the National Basketball Association (NBA) as a backup point guard for the Houston Rockets, Chicago Bulls, Charlotte Hornets and New Orleans Hornets.

== High school career ==
After having been exposed to basketball for years through his father's head coaching position, Bryce played basketball as the point guard for Valparaiso High School in Valparaiso, Indiana. As he progressed through high school though, Drew developed a rapid heartbeat, which required three surgeries to repair. Despite this difficulty, he led his team to the state final game, and was named Indiana's Mr. Basketball of 1994. He was also named the Gatorade Indiana Player of the Year his senior season in high school after guiding his team to a 28–1 season with the only loss coming in the state finals in overtime to the South Bend Clay High School Colonials.

== College career ==
Though recruited by dozens of schools, Drew eventually decided to attend Valparaiso University, then a member of the Mid-Continent Conference, for men's basketball. In his four years playing, Drew collected dozens of honors and records, including being ranked in the top 15 nationally in 3-point field goal and free throw percentage and leading the team to three consecutive conference regular season and tournament championships. He collected three conference tournament MVP awards, two conference MVP awards, and is Valparaiso's all-time 3-point field goal, and assist leader. He ranks second in points for Valparaiso, being passed by Alec Peters in 2017.

=== "The Shot" ===
During the 1998 NCAA Division I men's basketball tournament, 13-seed Valparaiso was facing 4-seed Ole Miss in the first round. Valparaiso was down 69–67 with 4.1 seconds remaining in the game and Mississippi's Ansu Sesay at the free throw line. After Sesay missed both shots, the Crusaders came up with possession 94 feet (29 m) from their basket, and 2.5 seconds remaining in the game. On the inbound, the Crusaders used a play known as "Pacer". Jamie Sykes in bounded to Bill Jenkins, who passed the ball to Bryce Drew. Drew made a 23-foot 3-point shot, giving him his 22nd point of the night, and clinching the Crusaders' 70–69 upset and advancing them in the tournament. Drew proceeded to lead the defeat of 12-seeded Florida State 83–77 in overtime, with a 22-point game. Drew and the Crusaders fell to 8-seeded Rhode Island by a score of 74–68, with Drew scoring 18 points. Sports Illustrated ranked it the No. 5 sports moment of 1998.

== Professional career ==
Following his rise to fame in the tournament, Drew was selected as Valpo's first-ever first-round pick as the 16th selection of the 1998 NBA draft by the Houston Rockets. After playing with the Rockets for two years, Drew spent one season with the Chicago Bulls, and signed as a free agent for three seasons with the New Orleans Hornets (Charlotte Hornets during his first season with the team). Drew was then waived by the Hornets, and played professionally for the Valencia BC for a year.

During the draft process, the Orlando Magic were between Drew and Jason Williams. A one-on-one competition was held between him and Jason Williams. Of the competition, Williams said Drew "had a better chance of pissing in a hot sauce bottle than beating me."

== Coaching career ==
=== Valparaiso ===
In the summer of 2005, Drew was selected as the new assistant coach of the Valparaiso University men's basketball team. In 2006, Bryce was elevated to the position of associate coach, a promotion that Scott had also received in 2001 before taking over as head coach in 2002. When Homer Drew retired in May 2011, Bryce Drew was hired as the head coach. Drew was also honored as one of Valparaiso University's 150 Most Influential Persons in the university's history.

=== Vanderbilt ===
On April 6, 2016, after five seasons as Valparaiso's coach, Drew was hired by Vanderbilt to be their head coach. In his introductory press conference, he stated, "No Vanderbilt team has ever made it to the Final Four, and we would like to be that first Vanderbilt team."

The Commodores qualified for the NCAA tournament in his first year coaching at Vanderbilt in 2016–2017, narrowly losing to Northwestern in the first round. The team struggled the 2017–18 season, however, posting the first 20-loss season in school history.

Recruiting for the 2018–19 season showed promise as Drew signed 5-star recruits Darius Garland and Simisola Shittu, along with 4-star recruit Aaron Nesmith. Garland and Nesmith would later become NBA lottery picks, in 2019 and 2020, respectively. However, success in recruiting did not translate to success on the court. Garland, the team's starting point guard, was injured during a loss to Kent State, ending his season, and the Commodores went on to lose the final 20 games of its 2018–19 schedule, including going 0–18 in SEC play, becoming the first SEC team in 65 years to go win-less in conference play since Georgia Tech went 0–14 in SEC competition in 1953–54. The best showing of the year for Vanderbilt was narrowly losing in overtime to AP #1 Tennessee Volunteers basketball 88–83. On March 22, 2019, Vanderbilt fired Drew.

=== Grand Canyon ===
On March 17, 2020, Drew was hired as the head coach of Grand Canyon, replacing Dan Majerle.

On March 6, 2021, Drew coached Grand Canyon to its first WAC regular-season championship in school history. A week later, the Antelopes won the WAC tournament championship as well, earning their first trip to the NCAA tournament in the process. The pandemic-impacted tournament was held entirely in Indianapolis, where the Lopes were a 15 seed and fell to No. 2-seed Iowa at Indiana Farmers Coliseum.

Despite his team largely underachieving in 2022–23—finishing fifth in the WAC standings after being named the preseason favorite—the Lopes went on a run in the WAC tournament, winning four games in four days to return to the NCAA tournament where they fell to Gonzaga in Denver.

Drew's team excelled in 2023–24, finishing 30–5. He netted his first career win in the NCAA tournament when the 12th-seeded Lopes upset 5th-seeded Saint Mary's before losing to eventual Final Four qualifier Alabama after leading with under six minutes to play.

== Broadcasting career ==
After his termination from Vanderbilt, Drew joined ESPN as an analyst for its college basketball coverage. He spent the 2019–20 season mostly covering conference games between teams from the American Athletic Conference before leaving to take the head coaching job at Grand Canyon.

== Personal life ==
Drew is the brother-in-law of former University of Toledo and Philadelphia 76ers basketball player, Casey Shaw. Drew's sister Dana is Shaw's wife. Shaw worked as an assistant coach under Drew at Vanderbilt.

Drew's wife, formerly Tara Thibodeaux, is a dancer and choreographer. She was a semi-finalist competing at the age of 15 in the V USA IBC International Ballet Competition held in 1994. In 2001 and 2002, she was a member of the Atlanta Hawks NBA dance team. She was awarded the prestigious Outstanding Choreographer Award at the 2017 Youth American Grand Prix in Chicago for her "Dying Swan" and has set choreography for Ballet Magnificat "The Arrival" and "Stratagem". She currently teaches and trains young dancers in Nashville. Tara is the daughter of Kathy Thibodeaux, an American ballet dancer and artistic director, and former child actor and musician Keith Thibodeaux, who portrayed Ricky Ricardo, Jr. ("Little Ricky") on the TV series I Love Lucy. Bryce and Tara have a son named Bryson.

His brother, Scott Drew, is the basketball coach at Baylor University in Waco, Texas.

Drew is a Christian. He has stated that recruiting centers on building relationships, describing the process of meeting with a young man and his family to plan for the future and later seeing those goals achieved as rewarding. Drew has emphasized developing young men into godly individuals and strong husbands, while also pursuing competitive success.”

== Head coaching record ==
Record table
Season	Team	Overall	Conference	Standing	Postseason
Valparaiso Crusaders (Horizon League) (2011–2016)
2011–12	Valparaiso	22–12	14–4	1st	NIT First Round
2012–13	Valparaiso	26–8	13–3	1st	NCAA Division I Round of 64
2013–14	Valparaiso	18–16	9–7	4th	CIT First Round
2014–15	Valparaiso	28–6	13–3	1st	NCAA Division I Round of 64
2015–16	Valparaiso	30–7	16–2	1st	NIT Runner-up
Valparaiso:		124–49 (.717)	65–19 (.774)		
Vanderbilt Commodores (Southeastern Conference) (2016–2019)
2016–17	Vanderbilt	19–16	10–8	T–5th	NCAA Division I Round of 64
2017–18	Vanderbilt	12–20	6–12	13th	
2018–19	Vanderbilt	9–23	0–18	14th	
Vanderbilt:		40–59 (.404)	16–38 (.296)		
Grand Canyon Antelopes (Western Athletic Conference) (2020–2025)
2020–21	Grand Canyon	17–7	9–3	T–1st	NCAA Division I Round of 64
2021–22	Grand Canyon	23–8	13–5	T–4th	
2022–23	Grand Canyon	24–12	11–7	T–4th	NCAA Division I Round of 64
2023–24	Grand Canyon	30–5	17–3	1st	NCAA Division I Round of 32
2024–25	Grand Canyon	26–8	13–3	2nd	NCAA Division I Round of 64
Grand Canyon Antelopes (Mountain West Conference) (2025–present)
2025–26	Grand Canyon	20–12	13–7	4th	
2026–27	Grand Canyon	4–0	0–0		
Grand Canyon:		144–52 (.735)	76–28 (.731)		
Total:		308–160 (.658)			
National champion Postseason invitational champion Conference regular season champion Conference regular season and conference tournament champion Division regular season champion Division regular season and conference tournament champion Conference tournament champion

Awards and achievements
Preceded by Maurice Fuller	Indiana Mr. Basketball award 1994	Succeeded by Damon Frierson
