= Spring Fever (1982 film) =

1982 Canadian-American film

- Theatrical release poster.
- Directed by: Joseph L. Scanlan
- Screenplay by: Stuart Gillard
- Produced by: John F. Bassett
- Starring: Susan Anton; Frank Converse; Jessica Walter
- Cinematography: Donald Wilder
- Edited by: Kirk Jones
- Music by: Fred Mollin
- Production companies: Amulet Pictures; Canadian Film Development Corporation; Famous Players Limited
- Release dates: December 30, 1982 (Canada); January 14, 1983 (United States)
- Running time: 95 minutes
- Countries: United States; Canada
- Language: English
- Box office: $3.1 million

Spring Fever is a 1982 Canadian-American comedy film directed by Joseph L. Scanlan, set in the world of competitive tennis. It was produced by Amulet Pictures with the participation of the Canadian Film Development Corporation and Famous Players Limited. The original title for the film was Sneakers, but was changed to Spring Fever when released.

The film follows a Las Vegas teen (Carling Bassett) as she participates in the National Junior Tennis Championship in Tampa, Florida with her showgirl mother (Susan Anton).

== Plot ==
Stevie Castle is a Las Vegas showgirl whose teen daughter K.C. demonstrates a promising aptitude for tennis. When K.C. enters a local tournament, she encounters hostility and snobbery from the tennis crowd due to her mother's profession.

== Cast ==
- Carling Bassett as Karen "K.C." Castle
- Susan Anton as Stevie Castle
- Jessica Walter as Celia Berryman
- Frank Converse as Lewis Berryman
- Stephen Young as Neil Berryman
- Shawn Foltz as Melissa "Missy" Berryman
- David Main as Van Beechum
- Briane Nasimok as Pedro the cab driver

== Soundtrack ==
1. "Hit Me with Your Best Shot" (Eddie Schwartz) - Pat Benatar
2. "The Long Arm" (Freddy Moore) - The Nu Kats
3. "Turn Me Loose" (Paul Dean - Mike Reno) - Loverboy
4. "Just One Chance to Be Free" (Fred Mollin) - Taffy McElroy
5. "Do It All Night" (Paul Sabu) - Barbara Law
6. "Easy Lover" (Fred Mollin) - Susan Anton
7. "Shake Your Bait" (Paul Sabu - Harry Hinde) - Barbara Law

== Reception ==
Roger Ebert gave the film one-and-half of four possible stars in his March 17, 1983 review in the Chicago Sun-Times. Ebert wrote that the film "does not show anybody even slightly resembling any of the three people in the ad. Nor does it have a scene in which two girls and a boy mess around at the beach."

At the 4th Genie Awards in Toronto in 1983, Fred Mollin's song "Just One Chance to Be Free" was nominated as Best Original Song.
