= Thibodeau =

Thibodeau is a French surname. Notable people with the surname include:

- David Thibodeau (born 1969), musician and former member of the Branch Davidians
- François Thibodeau (1939–2023), Canadian Roman Catholic prelate
- Joel Thibodeau, member of American folk band Death Vessel
- Kenneth Thibodeau (born 1945), American specialist in electronic records management
- Michael Thibodeau (born 1966), American politician and businessperson from Maine
- Michèle Thibodeau-DeGuire (born 1941), Canadian engineer and administrator
- Sean Thibodeau, American actor
- Serge Patrice Thibodeau (born 1959), Canadian writer and poet
- Theresa Thibodeau (born 1975), American politician from Nebraska
- Tom Thibodeau (born 1958), American basketball coach

Fictional characters:

- Carter Thibodeau, from Under the Dome by Stephen King
- Denise and Henry Thibodeau, from Olive Kitteridge by Elizabeth Strout

== Toponyms ==
- Thibodeau Bay, a bay of Gouin Reservoir, Quebec, Canada
- Thibodeau, village in Pisiguit, Nova Scotia, Canada
- Thibodaux, a city in Louisiana, formerly named Thibodeaux, in the United States

== See also ==
- Thibodeaux (disambiguation)
- Thibodaux
