= Susan Anton =

American actress

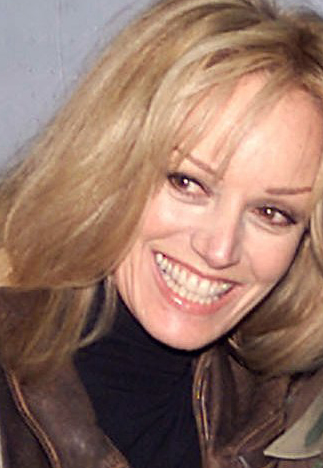
- Anton in 2001
- Education: Yucaipa High School; San Bernardino Valley College
- Occupations: Actress; singer
- Years active: 1969–present
- Known for: Goldengirl; Cannonball Run II; Baywatch
- Spouses: Jack Stein (m. 1975; div. 1980) Jeff Lester (m. 1992)
- Website: susananton.com

Susan Anton
- Height: 5 ft 11 in (1.80 m)
- Beauty pageant titleholder
- Title: Miss California 1969
- Hair color: Auburn
- Eye color: Hazel
- Major competition: Miss America (2nd runner-up)

Susan Anton is an American actress and singer. Her 1979 debut film, Goldengirl, earned her a Golden Globe nomination, leading to a contract with NBC for her variety show, Presenting Susan Anton. Later, NBC signed her for the drama series Cliffhangers.

Anton's Broadway credits include roles in Tommy Tune's The Will Rogers Follies and David Rabe's Hurlyburly, directed by Mike Nichols. She played Velma Von Tussle in the Las Vegas production of Hairspray, directed by Jack O’Brien and choreographed by Jerry Mitchell, and reprised this role at the Hollywood Bowl. Anton also co-starred in the national tour of All Shook Up and appeared for seven years in "The Great Radio City Music Hall Spectacular" with The Rockettes, directed by Joe Layton.

Her other stage work includes the Neil Simon/Marvin Hamlisch production "They’re Playing Our Song" and a national tour of "A Couple of White Chicks Sitting Around Talking" alongside Elizabeth Ashley. Anton has performed with notable entertainers like Frank Sinatra, Sammy Davis Jr., and Tom Jones. She toured with Kenny Rogers and had a top 10 country hit with "Killing Time." Internationally, she achieved success with the Gold record "Foxy."

Based in Las Vegas for over 20 years with her husband, director Jeff Lester, they founded Big Picture Studios in 1997. Through their company, Anton has executive produced projects like The Last Real Cowboys with Billy Bob Thornton and the documentary Speed of Life featuring Amy Purdy.

== Early life ==
Anton attended Yucaipa High School in Yucaipa, California, and graduated in 1968. After high school, Anton attended San Bernardino Valley College. She first experienced fame by winning the nearby Miss Redlands and later the Miss California beauty contests in 1969 and tied as second runner-up in the 1969 Miss America Scholarship Pageant held September 6 that year.

== Career ==
Starting in 1976, Anton developed a following for her Muriel Cigars commercials where she sang, "Let Muriel turn you on / That is my desire / Muriel lights a flame in me / Where there's Muriel smoke, there's fire". Later in the 1970s, Anton appeared approximately 30 times on Merv Griffin's TV show. She was frequently seen and heard in television, print and radio ads for the Perfect Sleeper mattress by Serta. In these ads, she announced her name and sang the company's jingle.

In 1978, ABC gave her and country singer Mel Tillis a summertime variety series, Mel and Susan Together, produced by the Osmond Brothers. The pairing of Anton and Tillis was an unlikely one: he was popular in country music circles but hardly a national household name while Susan was barely known at all. The show disappeared after four weeks; nevertheless, she was later chosen as one of Time Magazine's "Most Promising Faces of 1979".

She later starred in her own variety show, Presenting Susan Anton, in Stop Susan Williams (one of three serials in the Cliffhangers series), and in the films Goldengirl, Spring Fever, and Cannonball Run II. She also recorded music, her biggest hit being "Killin' Time" in 1980, a duet with country singer Fred Knoblock. The record made Top 10 on the country charts and hit #28 on Billboard's Hot 100. In 1990, Anton appeared on the TV comedy series Night Court in an episode called "The Talk Show" where she played talk show producer Margo Hunter.

Anton is on the cover of the mass market paperback edition of Goldengirl, written by Peter Lovesey (using the pen name Peter Lear). She had appeared as the title character in the film version which starred James Coburn and was directed by Joseph Sargent.

Anton made four exercise videos in 1989 under the title Slimatics. The four volumes were Aerobic Dance Workout, First Steps to Fitness, Total Body Toning and Fat Burner Workout.

Anton was the host of the successful "Great Radio City Music Hall Spectacular" show at the Flamingo Hilton in Las Vegas for over 5,000 performances until July 31, 2000. She also appeared in the Las Vegas company of the musical Hairspray and on Broadway in The Will Rogers Follies, Hurlyburly, and All Shook Up.

Anton had a recurring role on the TV series Baywatch from 1992 to 1994 and has appeared as herself on Queer Eye for the Straight Guy (2006), The Larry Sanders Show (1993) and It's Garry Shandling's Show (1987), as well as in several films. She appeared in an episode of Law & Order: Special Victims Unit which aired on March 31, 2010.

In 2016 Anton appeared in the movie Sharknado: The 4th Awakens. In 2020, she starred in the feature psychological thriller film Painter.

== Filmography ==
Susan Anton film work
Year	Title	Role	Notes
1977	Wizards	Princess Elinore / The Balladeer	singing voice (uncredited)
1979	Goldengirl	Goldine Serafin	
1982	Spring Fever	Stevie Castle	
1984	Cannonball Run II	Jill, Lamborghini Babe	
1987	Making Mr. Right	Soap Opera Actress	(uncredited)
1989	Options	Princess Nicole (in telefilm epilogue)	
1991	Lena's Holiday	Sara	
1999	New Jersey Turnpikes		
2004	Whistlin' Dixie	Dixie Dawson	(short)
2008	Playing with Fire	Sandra Nevell	
2020	Painter	Carree Tole	Indie feature film

Susan Anton television work
Year	Title	Role	Notes
1973	The Great American Beauty Contest	Betty Sue Allen – Last Year's Queen	TV movie
1976	Serpico	Model	Episode: "Strike!" (1.5)
1976	Police Story	Party Girl #2	Episode: "Monster Manor" (4.8)
1977	Hunter	Cissy	Episode: "The Costa Rican Connection" (1.5)
1977	Switch	Marcy	Episode: "Go for Broke" (3.7)
1978	The Jim Nabors Show	Herself	
1978	Hollywood Squares	Guest Appearance	3 episodes
1978	The Mike Douglas Show	Herself – Vocalist	(17.33)
1979	American Music Awards of 1979	Herself – Presenter	
1979	The Mike Douglas Show	Herself – Vocalist	(17.90)
1979	Stop Susan Williams	Susan Williams	10 episodes
1979	Presenting Susan Anton	Herself – Host	4 episodes
1979	The Girls Who Saved the World	Susan Williams	TV movie
1980	American Movie Awards	Herself – Performer	TV special
1982	American Music Awards of 1982	Herself	
1982	Golden Globe Award	Herself	
1982	Academy Awards	Herself	
1983	The Love Boat	Leslie Webb	Episode: "The Pledge/East Meets West/Dear Roberta/My Dumplings: Part 1" (7.1)
1983	The Love Boat	Leslie Webb	Episode: "The Pledge/East Meets West/Dear Roberta/My Dumplings: Part 2" (7.2)
1984	The Boy Who Loved Trolls	Kalotte	TV movie
1984	Mike Hammer	Noelle Roberts	Episode: "The Deadly Prey" (2.8)
1985	Placido Domingo: Stepping Out with the Ladies	Herself	TV special
1985	39th Tony Awards	Herself – Presenter & Performer	TV special
1986	40th Tony Awards	Herself – Performer & Presenter: Best Book of a Musical	TV special
1986	Super Password	Herself	5 episodes
1986	Hardesty House	Charlotte Montgomery	TV movie
1986	Murder, She Wrote	Christine Clifford	Episode: "Corned Beef and Carnage" (3.5)
1987	Making Mr. Right	Soap Opera Actress	(uncredited)
1987	Mr. Belvedere	Herself	Episode: "Separation" (3.20)
1987	Hotel	Linda Davis	Episode: "All the King's Horses" (4.22)
1987	Jonathan Winters: On the Ledge		TV movie
1987	It's Garry Shandling's Show	Herself	Episode: "No Baby, No Show" (2.2)
1988	Alfred Hitchcock Presents	Diane Lewis	Episode: "Animal Lovers" (3.2)
1988	My Secret Identity	Susan Anderson	Episode: "Memories" (1.5)
1989	The Pat Sajak Show	Herself	(1.66)
1989	The Home Show	Herself – Co-Host	
1989	Murder, She Wrote	Celia James	Episode: "Jack and Bill" (6.5)
1989	The Famous Teddy Z	Esther Luna	Episode: "Baking with Esther Luna" (1.7)
1990	Night Court	Margo Hunter	Episode: "The Talk Show" (7.17)
1990	Quantum Leap	Helen Le Baron	Episode: "One Strobe Over the Line – June 15, 1965" (3.4)
1990	Out of This World	Sandy Martin	Episode: "Best Friends" (4.6)
1991	Blossom	Suzy	Episode: "Expectations" (2.10)
1992	Dangerous Curves	Ellen Tarbuck	Episode: "Deadlier Than the Male" (1.8)
1992	The Ben Stiller Show	Susan Anton	Episode: "With Dennis Miller" (1.10)
1993	Civil Wars	Cassie Strait	Episode: "Dances with Sharks" (2.13)
1993	The Larry Sanders Show	Susan Anton	Episode: "The Breakdown: Part 2" (2.2)
1992–1994	Baywatch	Jackie Quinn	13 episodes
1997	City Guys	Mrs. Anderson	Episode: "For the Love of Mother" (1.2)
1997	City Guys	Mrs. Anderson	Episode: "Red Ferrari" (1.7)
2002	Hollywood Squares	Guest Appearance	
2002	TVography: Suzanne Somers – Mastering Success	Herself	TV movie documentary
2006	CMT: Greatest Miss America Moments	Herself	TV special
2006	Queer Eye for the Straight Guy	Herself	Episode: "Turn a Poker Dud Into a Five Card Stud: Ed M" (4.3)
2009	Sex in '69: The Sexual Revolution in America	Herself	TV special
2010	Law & Order: Special Victims Unit	Jenny Coswold	Episode: "Bedtime" (11.18)
2016	Sharknado: The 4th Awakens	Betty	Television film
2022	The Cleaning Lady	Ginger Cline	Episode: "The Brit" (2.5)

== Discography ==
Susan Anton albums
Year	Album	Label
1981	Foxy	Scotti Bros.
1981	Killin' Time	Scotti Bros.
2001	One Night	Varese Sarabande

Susan Anton singles
Year	Single
1980	"Killin' Time" (with Fred Knoblock)

Awards and achievements
Preceded by Sharon Terrill	Miss California; 1969	Succeeded by Karin Kascher
