= Kathy Thibodeaux =

American ballet dancer

Kathy Thibodeaux (born Katherine Ann Denton; 9 November 1956) is an American ballet dancer who, in 1986, became co-founder and Artistic Director of Ballet Magnificat!.

== Early life ==
Kathy Thibodeaux was born in Memphis, Tennessee, the oldest of four girls, to Mary Frances Waring and Henry Lee (Bo) Denton. She moved to Jackson, Mississippi, as a young child and, except for a short time in California, has lived there all of her life. She began ballet classes at the age of six with the Jackson Ballet School; was a competitive swimmer winning many trophies through her school years; and was a cheerleader during her jr. high and high school days at Chastain Jr. High School and Manhattan Academy. In 1976, she married Keith Thibodeaux, a former child actor and musician who appeared on I Love Lucy and The Lucy-Desi Comedy Hour television shows and later drummer for the groundbreaking Christian rock band David and the Giants. They have one daughter, Tara Thibodeaux Drew (b. 1979), a dancer, teacher and choreographer, who is married to former NBA player and college basketball coach Bryce Drew, and one grandson, Bryson.

== Career ==
At the Jackson Ballet School (later Ballet Mississippi), Kathy studied under American Ballet Theatre’s Albia Kavan and Rex Cooper. When the Jackson Ballet Company turned professional in 1978 under the direction of Thalia Mara, Kathy became one of the first dancers to be contracted, soon soaring to the highest levels of the company and becoming a Principal Dancer, a position she held until 1986.

Kathy stepped into the spotlight of the international dance world in 1982, winning a Silver Medal at the II USA International Ballet Competition which rotates between Jackson and Russia, Finland and Bulgaria. For the third contemporary round in that competition, against the advice of many, Kathy chose to express her faith in a dance to Sandi Patty’s "We Shall Behold Him".

== Ballet Magnificat! ==
In 1986, Keith and Kathy founded Ballet Magnificat!, recognized as "America's premier Christian ballet company". Kathy had a passion and unique vision for something totally unheard of – a touring Christian ballet troupe that would dance to the glory of God. She envisioned Christian dancers coming together for the purpose of glorifying God in dance. In addition to bringing people into worship, Kathy wanted the group to be an outreach ministry in which dancers would share the love of Jesus with their gifts and talents. Keith became Executive Director of the ministry in 1990.

With space donated by Belhaven College, and the help of Kathy’s friend and choreographer Gregory Smith, the fledgling company - the world’s first professional Christian ballet company - was soon dancing and touring across the country.

Since its founding, the company has expanded and is a 501(c)(3) non-profit ministry consisting of a full-time Touring Company, Pre-Professional Training Program, School of the Arts, Summer Dance Intensive, Jr. Dance Intensive, and Brazil satellite company and school. Ballet Magnificat! is now considered the benchmark for professional Christian dance around the world and is credited for its role in restoring dance as a form of worship in the church. The touring company has performed in over 43 countries, inspired young dancers around the world, and impacted the lives of thousands.

In 2006, Kathy authored a children's book based on the ballet A Christmas Dream which she choreographed in honor of Ballet Magnificat!'s 20th anniversary.

Kathy danced and toured with the company until 2019, now focusing on teaching, directing the professional company, and running the still-growing dance ministry, both in the U.S. and Brazil. She continues to train daily and perform on occasion, enjoying select character roles in Ballet Magnificat’s original story ballets.

== Recognitions ==
In 1983, “Kathy Thibodeaux Day” was proclaimed by order of Mississippi Governor William Winter, a commendation by Mississippi Governor Ray Mabus was issued in 1989, and a resolution commending Kathy was given by the Alabama Senate in 1998. In 2008, Mississippi Governor Haley Barbour, along with Peavey Music Founder Hartley Peavey, presented Kathy with the annual Hartley D. Peavey Award for Entrepreneurial Excellence.

== Family ==
- Keith Thibodeaux, Executive Director
- Tara Thibodeaux Drew, daughter
- Bryce Drew, son-in-law
