= Edie Adams =

American actress (1927–2008)

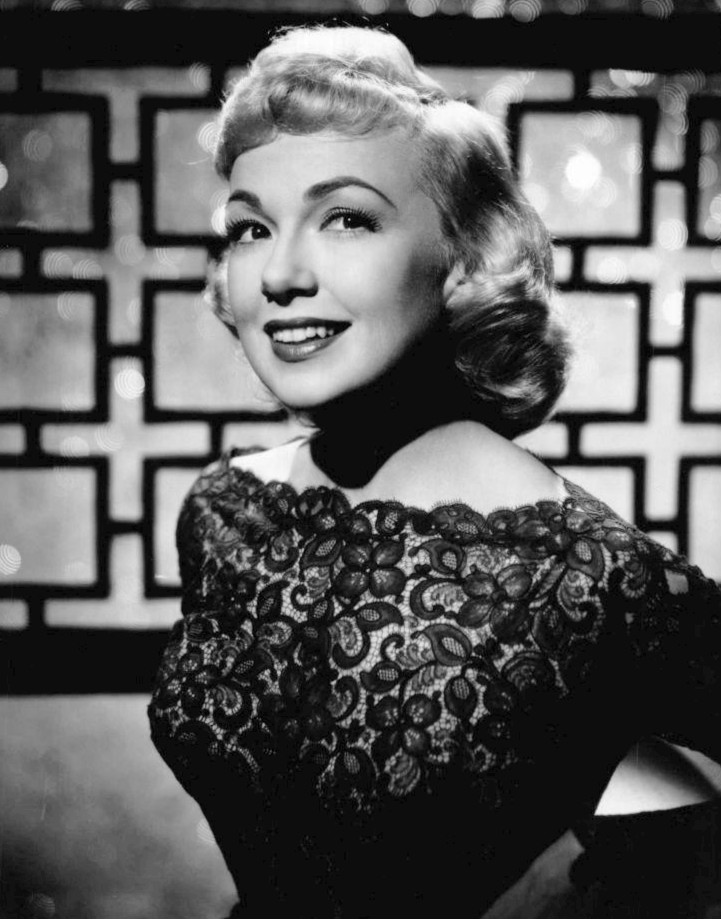
- Adams in 1958
- Born: Edith Elizabeth Enke; April 16, 1927; Kingston, Pennsylvania, U.S.
- Died: October 15, 2008 (aged 81); Los Angeles, California, U.S.
- Resting place: Forest Lawn Memorial Park, Hollywood Hills
- Other names: Edythe Adams; Edith Adams; Edith Candoli
- Education: Juilliard School (BM); Columbia University (BA); Actors Studio
- Occupations: Comedian; actress; singer; businesswoman
- Years active: 1950–2004
- Spouses: Ernie Kovacs (m. 1954; died 1962) Martin Mills (m. 1964; div. 1971) Pete Candoli (m. 1972; div. 1988)
- Children: 2

Edie Adams (born Edith Elizabeth Enke; April 16, 1927 – October 15, 2008) was an American comedian, actress, singer and businesswoman who was prominent in the second half of the 1900s. She earned a Tony Award and was nominated for an Emmy Award.

Adams was known for her impersonations of sex symbols on stage and television, especially Marilyn Monroe. She was the frequent television partner of Ernie Kovacs, her husband, whose death in 1962 left Adams deeply in debt. Paying off the financial burden, she continued her successful show business career for over four more decades on stage, television and in films including It's a Mad, Mad, Mad, Mad World, and was the pitchlady for Muriel Cigars for 20 years. Adams also founded two beauty businesses: Edie Adams Cosmetics and Edie Adams Cut 'n' Curl.

== Early life ==
Adams was born in Kingston, Pennsylvania, the only daughter of Sheldon Alonzo Enke and Ada Dorothy (née Adams), whom she described as "two conservative native Pennsylvanians". She had an elder brother, Sheldon Adams Enke. The family moved to nearby areas such as Shavertown and Trucksville and spent a year in New York City before settling in Tenafly, New Jersey, where she attended Tenafly High School. Ada Enke, who had a "trained dramatic soprano voice," taught her daughter singing and piano; mother and daughter were members of the Grove City Presbyterian church choir. Adams's grandmother, a seamstress, taught her how to sew. She made her own clothing beginning in the sixth grade and Adams would later have her own designer line of clothing, called Bonham, Inc.

After high school, she wanted to pursue a career as a vocalist, but was unsure whether she would make the cut after music school auditions. She knew that her costuming skills were at a level to constitute a fallback, with Traphagen School of Fashion as her "safe school" during the college application process. In the event, she succeeded in getting into Juilliard, where she earned a vocal degree, and then took a "fifth year" and graduated from Columbia School of Drama. She also later studied at the Actors Studio in New York. While at Juilliard she was, by her own account, one of the first women to be interviewed for the Kinsey Report on female sexuality. While still at Juilliard, she taught part-time at the Barbizon School of Modeling and gave assemblies at New Jersey high schools, intended to recruit female students for various colleges and commercial schools. The assemblies had been conceived more as lectures, but once she discovered that her pay would be mainly commissions for interest generated, she turned them much more into performances.

Although she studied and sang serious music at Juilliard, summer jobs (including performing in a production of The Pirates of Penzance) and her New York social life introduced her to lighter, more popular performance styles, as well as to New York's café society and the Brill Building crowd. One of her vocal teachers, Dusolina Giannini gave her some half-encouraging, half-discouraging advice: to abandon her hopes of being an opera singer and "go straight into musical comedy." After turning down an offer from Richard Rodgers to be an understudy in the road company of South Pacific, she also turned down a 5-year contract from MGM that would have groomed her toward becoming a movie actress, but would not have promised her any specific film work.

She knew that with her Juilliard education she could fall back to being a music teacher, but was still determined to try to break into show business. She began going to every audition (not only as a singer, but for legitimate theater) and entering every vocal contest she could find. She passed an audition to go on the road with Vaughn Monroe, but her father put his foot down about her traveling with a big band. In 1949–50, she appeared in the early live television show Bonnie Maid's Versatile Varieties as one of the original "Bonnie Maids" doing live commercials for the sponsor. According to her memoir, she did a three-week stint in Montreal and Toronto singing with a trio led by Artie Arturo.

Kovacs as "Leena, Queen of the Jungle" with Adams in 1956

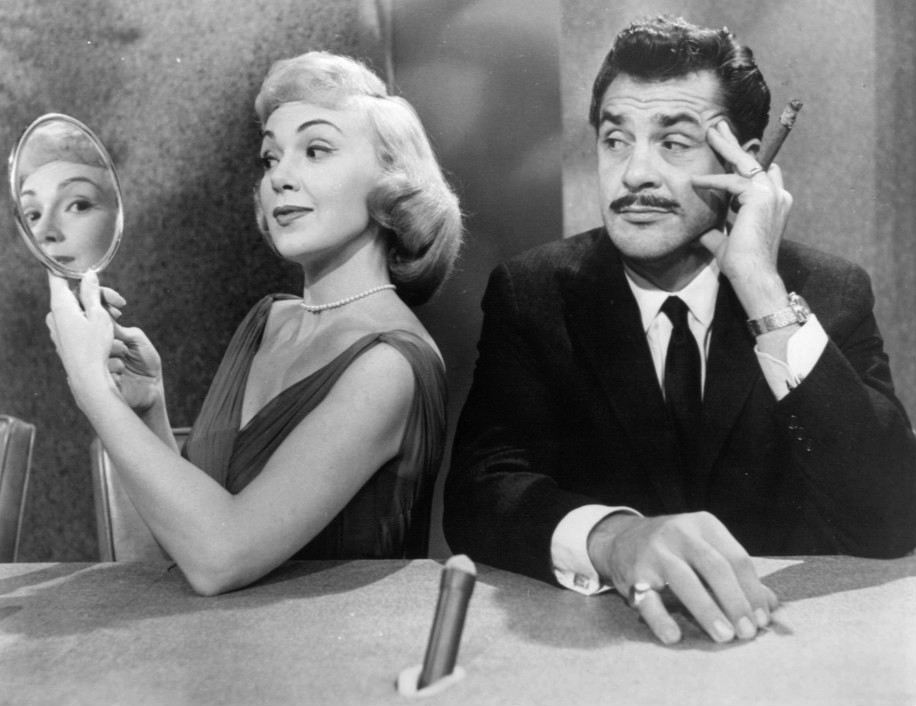
With Ernie Kovacs in Take a Good Look, 1960

In 1950, she won the "Miss U.S. Television" beauty contest, which led to an appearance with Milton Berle on his television show. Her earliest television work billed her as Edith Adams. One of her early appearances was on Arthur Godfrey's Talent Scouts. She was seen by the producer of the Ernie Kovacs show Three to Get Ready (in Philadelphia), who invited her to audition. Adams had very little experience with popular music and could perform only three songs. She later stated: "I sang them all during the audition, and if they had asked to hear another, I never would have made it." She became part of the show in July 1951. Adams had never seen the program she was hired for. When he saw his daughter on the show, Adams's father was upset to find her role involved trying to avoid pies in the face. In one of his last interviews, Kovacs looked back on the early days, saying, "I wish I could say I was the big shot that hired her, but it was my show in name only—the producer had all the say. Later on I did have something to say and I said it, 'Let's get married.'"

== Career ==
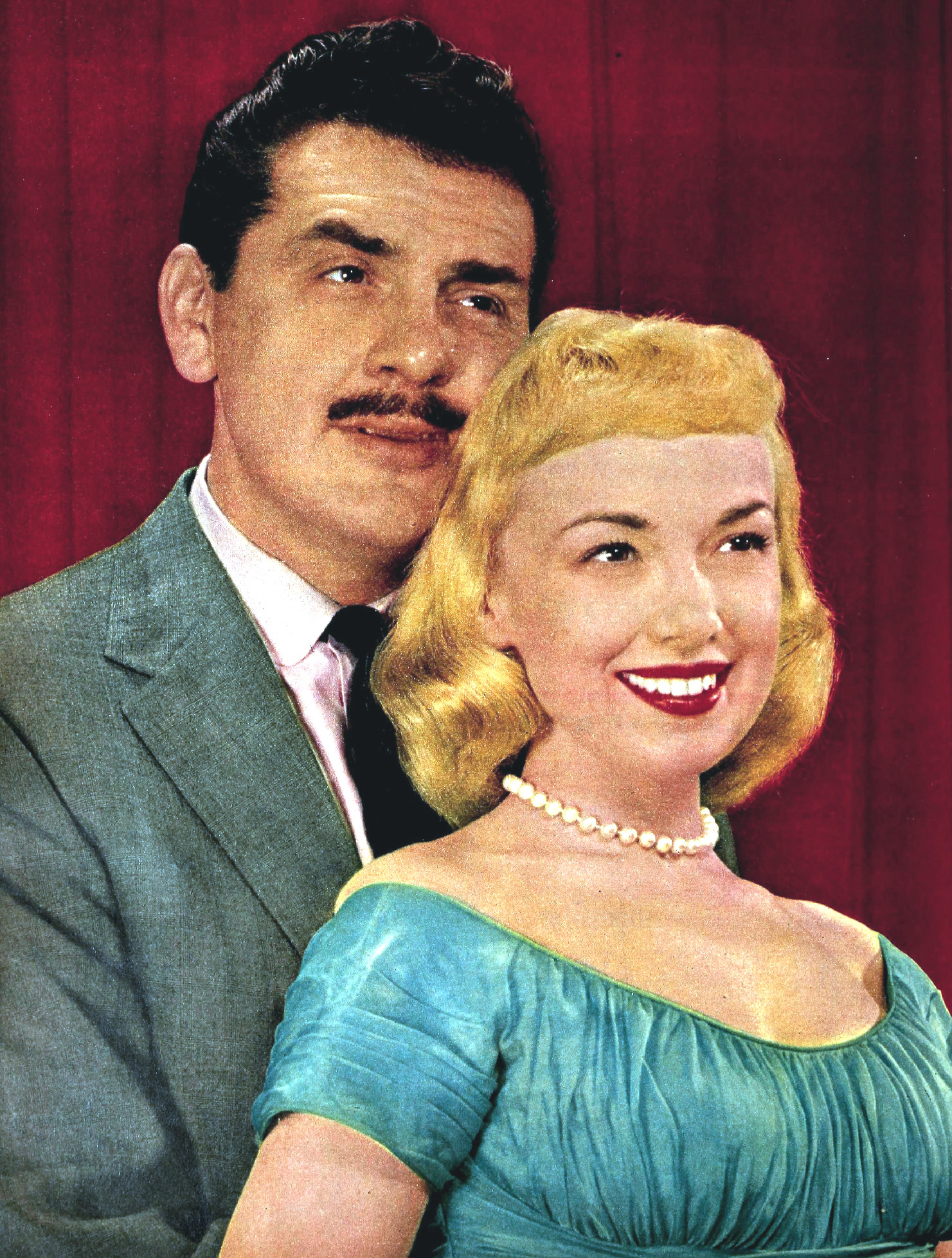
Adams and Kovacs, 1956

Adams began working regularly on television with Kovacs and talk show pioneer Jack Paar. After a courtship that included mariachi bands and an unexpected diamond engagement ring, Adams and Kovacs eloped; they were married on September 12, 1954, in Mexico City. Adams was initially uncertain about marrying Kovacs. She went on a six-week European cruise, hoping to come to a decision. After three days away and many long-distance phone calls, Adams returned home with an answer: yes. It was Kovacs's second marriage and lasted until his death in a car accident on January 13, 1962.

Adams and Kovacs received Emmy nominations for best performances in a comedy series in 1957. In 1960, she and Kovacs played themselves in The Lucy–Desi Comedy Hour final television special on CBS, during which she performed the send-off song "That's All". Adams made four appearances on What's My Line? (once as "Edith Adams (Mrs. Ernie Kovacs)" while her husband was on the panel; once together with Kovacs; twice alone as Edie Adams).

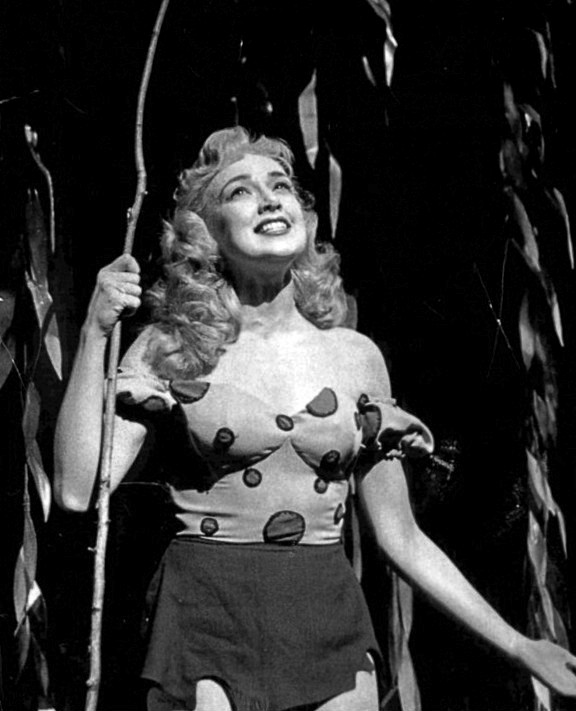
Adams as Daisy Mae in Li'l Abner, 1956

Adams starred on Broadway in Wonderful Town (1953) opposite Rosalind Russell (winning the Theatre World Award), and as Daisy Mae in Li'l Abner (1956), winning the Tony Award for Best Featured Actress in a Musical. She played the Fairy Godmother in Rodgers and Hammerstein's original Cinderella broadcast in 1957. Adams was to play Daisy Mae in the film version of Li'l Abner but was unable due to the late arrival of her daughter, Mia Susan Kovacs.

After Kovacs's death, his network, ABC, gave Adams a chance with her own show, Here's Edie, which received five Emmy nominations but lasted one season, in 1963. Kovacs was a noted cigar smoker, and Adams did a long-running series of TV commercials for Muriel Cigars. She remained the pitch-lady for Muriel well after Kovacs's death, intoning in a Mae West style and sexy outfit, "Why don't you pick one up and smoke it sometime?" Another commercial for Muriel Cigars, which cost 10 cents, showed Adams singing, "Hey, big spender, spend a little dime with me" (based on the song "Big Spender" from the musical Sweet Charity). Adams's cigar commercials made her one of the top three most-recognizable television celebrities. In subsequent years, Adams made sporadic television appearances, including on Fantasy Island, The Love Boat, McMillan & Wife, Murder, She Wrote and Designing Women.

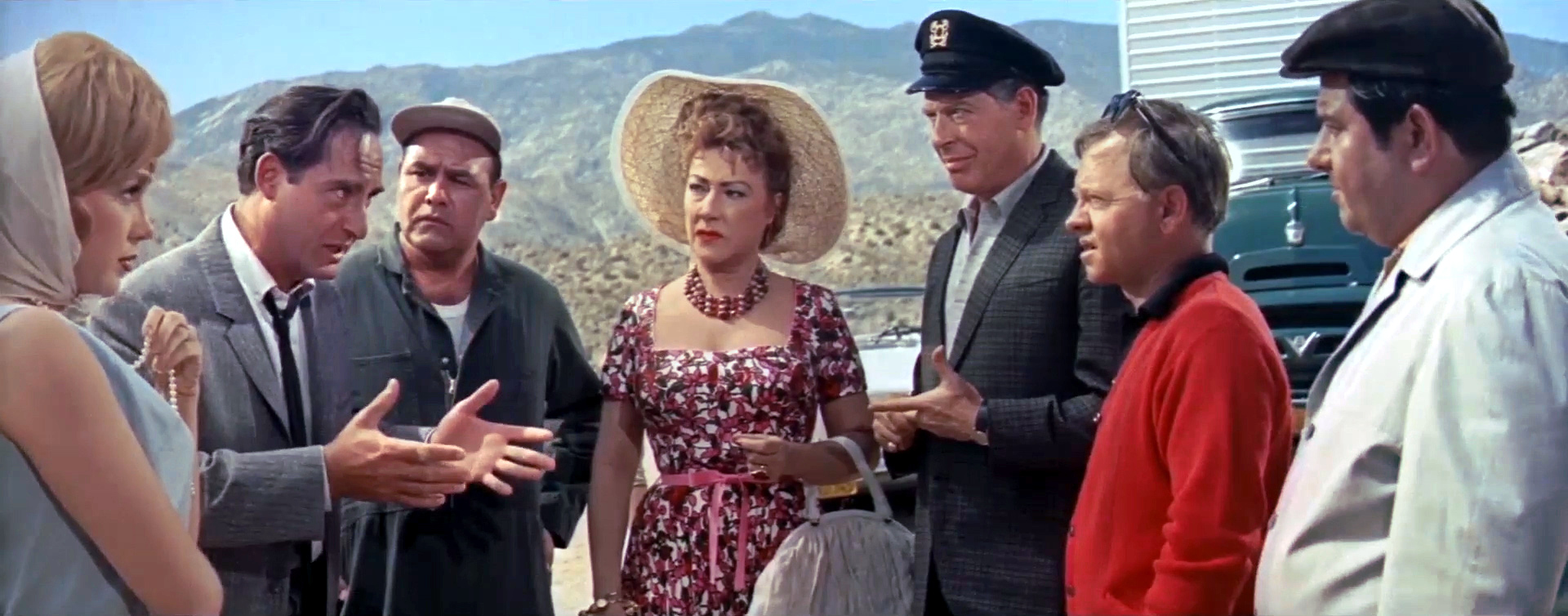
Left to right: Edie Adams, Sid Caesar, Jonathan Winters, Ethel Merman, Milton Berle, Mickey Rooney and Buddy Hackett in It's a Mad, Mad, Mad, Mad World (1963)

Adams played supporting roles in several films in the 1960s, including the embittered secretary of two-timing Fred MacMurray in the Oscar-winning film The Apartment (1960). She was the wife of a presidential candidate (played by Cliff Robertson) in The Best Man (1964) and was reunited with Robertson for the comedy The Honey Pot (1967). In 2003, as one of the surviving headliners from the all-star comedy It's a Mad, Mad, Mad, Mad World (1963), she joined actors Marvin Kaplan and Sid Caesar at a 40th anniversary celebration of the film. She was also a successful nightclub headliner.

Shortly after her husband's death, Adams won a "nasty custody battle" with Kovacs's ex-wife over Edie's stepdaughters. His ex-wife had previously kidnapped the girls during a visit years before; because Kovacs was their legal guardian, he and Edie had worked tirelessly to locate his daughters and bring them home.

Another court battle began for Adams in the same year, this time with her mother-in-law, who refused to believe there were more debts than assets in her son's estate. Mary Kovacs accused her daughter-in-law of mismanaging the estate and petitioned for custody of her granddaughters. The dispute lasted for years, with Adams remaining the administrator of her husband's estate and guardian of the three girls. She worked for years to pay her late husband's tax debt to the IRS. The couple's celebrity friends planned a TV special benefit for Edie and her family, but she declined, saying, "I can take care of my own children." She spent the next year working practically non-stop.

=== Starting over ===
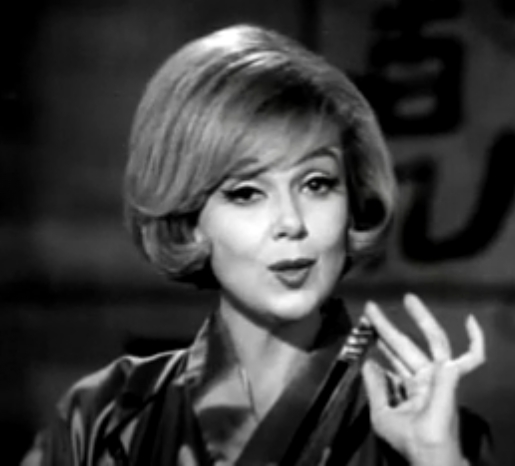
Adams in a Muriel Cigars commercial, 1965–1966

Adams started her own businesses, Edie Adams Cosmetics, which sold door-to-door, and Edie Adams Cut 'n' Curl beauty salons, which she began in 1967. She once owned a 160-acre (65 ha) California almond farm and was the spokeswoman for Sun Giant nuts. Because of her 20 years of commercials for Muriel Cigars (retiring in 1976) and her successful business ventures, Adams went from being mired in debt after Kovacs's fatal accident in 1962 to being a millionaire in 1989.

== Personal life ==
After Kovacs's death, Adams was married two more times. In 1964, she married photographer Martin Mills. In 1972, she married trumpeter Pete Candoli, with whom she appeared in a touring production of the Cole Porter musical Anything Goes. In addition to raising stepdaughters Bette and Kippie from her marriage to Kovacs, Adams gave birth to daughter Mia Susan Kovacs (killed in an automobile accident in 1982) and son Joshua Mills.

Although Adams identified as a Democrat, she campaigned for liberal Republicans such as Jacob Javits and later Nelson Rockefeller.

Adams was an early advocate of civil rights, frequently lending her support to the movement at celebrity events and on her own television show during the early sixties. She insisted that her duet with Sammy Davis Jr. on her variety show Here's Edie be staged so that they were seated next to each other – as equals. Prior to that, entertainers of different races and sexes were unable to perform next to one another, so that one had to be in front of or behind the other.

There is a street named after Adams in San Antonio, Texas.

In 2026, Adams was announced as a posthumous inductee into the Luzerne County Arts & Entertainment Hall of Fame.

== Death ==
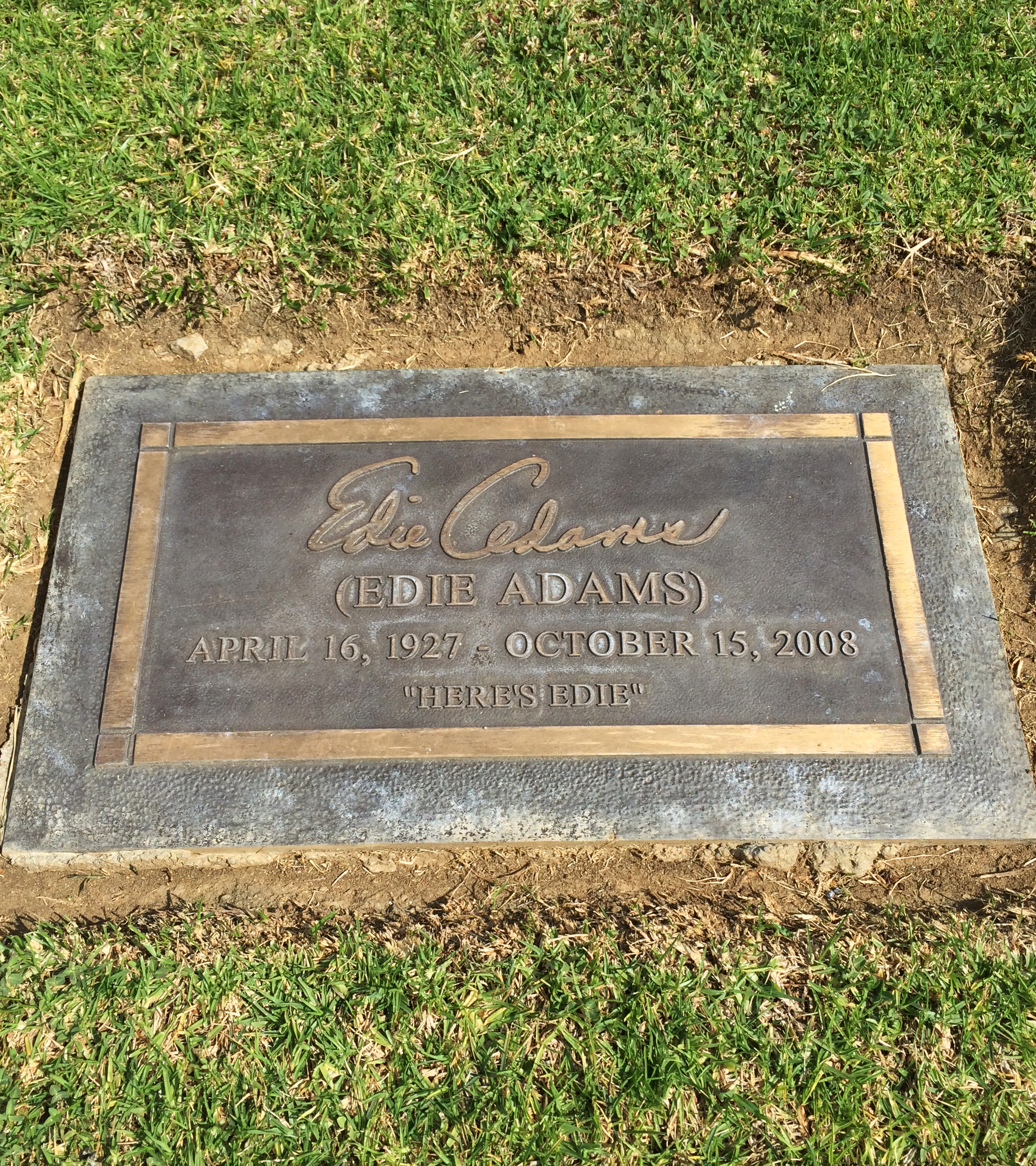
Adams's grave, Forest Lawn, Hollywood Hills

Adams died in Los Angeles, California, on October 15, 2008, at age 81, from cancer and pneumonia. She was interred in Forest Lawn Memorial Park, Hollywood Hills, alongside her first husband Ernie and between her daughter, Mia, and her stepdaughter, Kippie. After her death an article in The New York Times said that her work "both embodied and winked at the stereotypes of fetching chanteuse and sexpot blonde".

== Kovacs's legacy ==
Adams archived her husband's television work, which she described during a 1999 videotaped interview with the Archive of American Television. She later testified on the status of the archive of the short-lived DuMont Television Network, where both she and husband Kovacs worked during the early 1950s. Adams said that so little value was given to the film archive that the entire collection was loaded into three trucks and dumped into Upper New York Bay.

Upon discovering that her husband's work was disappearing through being discarded and re-use of the tapes, Adams initially used the proceeds of his insurance policy and her own earnings to purchase the rights to as much footage as possible.

Since 2008, Edie Adams's son Joshua Mills has run Ediad Productions, Inc., which controls the rights to all the Ernie Kovacs and Edie Adams TV shows and recordings. Ben Model is the archivist for the Ernie Kovacs and Edie Adams television collections.

In 2015, the Library of Congress acquired a collection of more than 1,200 kinescopes, videotapes and home movies featuring Ernie Kovacs and Edie Adams, from Joshua Mills, Edie Adams's son and the president of Ediad Productions.

== Filmography ==
Year	Title	Role	Notes
1956	Showdown at Ulcer Gulch		cameo
1960	The Apartment	Miss Olsen	
1961	Lover Come Back	Rebel Davis	
1963	Call Me Bwana	Frederica	
1963	Under the Yum Yum Tree	Dr. Irene Wilson	
1963	It's a Mad, Mad, Mad, Mad World	Monica Crump	
1963	Love with the Proper Stranger	Barbie	
1964	The Best Man	Mabel Cantwell	
1966	Made in Paris	Irene Chase	
1966	The Oscar	Trina Yale	
1967	The Honey Pot	Merle McGill	
1972	Evil Roy Slade	Flossie	
1978	Up in Smoke	Mrs. Tempest Stoner	
1979	Racquet	Leslie Sargent	
1980	The Happy Hooker Goes Hollywood	Rita Beater	
1982	Boxoffice	Carolyn	
2003	Broadway: The Golden Age, by the Legends Who Were There	Herself	

== Television ==
Year	Title	Role	Notes
1951–1952	Three to Get Ready		
1951	Ernie in Kovacsland	Herself - Vocalist	a summer replacement show
1952	Kovacs On the Corner	Herself - Edythe Adams	WPTZ, Philadelphia, 11:00 am until 11:30 on NBC-TV, canceled after three months
1952–1956	The Ernie Kovacs Show	Herself	Unknown episodes
1955	Appointment with Adventure		
1956	The Guy Lombardo Show		
1957	Cinderella	Fairy Godmother	
1958	The Garry Moore Show		
1958	The Gisele MacKenzie Show	Herself	
1958	The Pat Boone Chevy Showroom	Herself	
1958	The Dinah Shore Chevy Show	Herself	
1959-premiere	The Art Carney Show		
1960	The Lucy–Desi Comedy Hour	Herself, along with husband Ernie Kovacs, as the Ricardos' neighbors	Episode: "Lucy Meets the Mustache"
1960–1961	Take a Good Look	panelist	Unknown episodes
1961	The Spiral Staircase	Blanche	
1963–1964	Here's Edie	Herself - Host / Vocalist	Unknown episodes
1968	The Lucy Show	Nanette Johnson	Episode: "Mooney's Other Wife"
1970	Don Adams Special: Hooray for Hollywood	Herself	
1971	Love, American Style	Mrs. Winslow	Episode: "Love and the Hotel Caper"
1972	McMillan & Wife	Louise Montgomery	Episode: "Blues for Sally M."
1972	Evil Roy Slade	Flossie	
1975	Joe Forrester		Episode: "The Return of Joe Forrester"
1976	The Practice	Carlotta	Episode "Carlotta"
1976	Harry O	Kate Roberti	Episode: "Past Imperfect"
1976	The Blue Knight	Torchy	Episode: "A Slower Beat"
1978	Superdome	Joyce	
1978	The Eddie Capra Mysteries	Claudia Carroll	Episode "How Do I Kill Thee?"
1979	The Seekers	Flora Cato	Miniseries based on the novel by John Jakes
1979	Fast Friends	Connie Burton	
1979	Kate Loves a Mystery		
1980	Make Me an Offer	Francine Sherman	
1980	Portrait of an Escort	Mrs. Kennedy	
1980	A Cry for Love	Tessie	
1980	Bosom Buddies	Darlene	Pilot only
1981	CBS Children's Mystery Theatre	Madame Zenia	Episode: "The Haunting of Harrington House"
1981	Fantasy Island	Liz Fuller	Episode: "The Man from Yesterday/World's Most Desirable Woman"
1981	Vega$	Angela	Episode: "Sourdough Suite"
1982	As the World Turns	Roseanne	Unknown episodes
1983	Shooting Stars	Hazel	
1984	Ernie Kovacs: Between the Laughter	Mae West	
1984	Murder, She Wrote	Kaye Sheppard	Episode: "Capitol Offense"
1985	Trapper John, M.D.	Edie Marks	Episode: "The Muddle of the Knight"
1987	Adventures Beyond Belief	Flo	
1989	Jake Spanner, Private Eye	Senior Club Member	
1989-1990	It's Garry Shandling's Show	Clair King	2 episodes
1990	Designing Women	Edie	Episode: "La Place sans Souci"
1992	Kids Incorporated	Ms. Cooper	Episode: "The Show"
1993	Tales of the City	Ruby Miller	TV miniseries
2004	Great Performances: Rodgers and Hammerstein's 'Cinderella'	Fairy Godmother / Herself	TV series

== Sources ==
- Adams, Edie; Windeler, Robert (1990). Sing a Pretty Song... New York: William Morrow and Co. ISBN 0688073417.
