= David and the Giants =

American rock band

- David and the Giants (left to right) Clayborn Huff, Rayborn Huff, Keith Thibodeaux and David W. Huff

Background information
- Origin: Laurel, Mississippi, U.S.
- Genres: Contemporary Christian, Christian rock, rock
- Years active: 1963–present
- Labels: Myrrh; United Artists; Crazy Horse; Capitol; Benson; Giant; CBS Priority
- Members: David W. Huff; Rayborn Huff; Clayborn Huff; Keith Thibodeaux
- Past members: Lance Huff; Tate Huff; Gerald Hagan; Owen Hale; Dennon Dearman
- Website: davidandthegiants.com

David and the Giants began as a mainstream rock band in Laurel, Mississippi, with the Huff brothers David, Clayborn and Rayborn. Along with Keith Thibodeaux on drums, they toured the Southeast during the 1960s. In 1977, they switched to a Christian rock format. They continued to sing and record together through 1999.

Recording and performing together for almost 40 years, the band released 17 albums. Though the band's style has been compared to that of Mylon LeFevre and Broken Heart, their most commercially successful work came in the 1960s with a sound, augmented by The Muscle Shoals Horns, that closely resembled that of Jay & the Techniques.

== Music career ==
=== Early years and conversion ===
The band released its first single, a cover version of "Rockin' Robin" around 1964, under the name of Little David & the Giants. In 1969, Keith Thibodeaux (best known as "Little Ricky" from I Love Lucy) joined the band. His arrival marked the beginning of the band's most commercially successful era. Although band members often described their sound as having its roots in Southern rock, the band's most successful recordings became popular in England in the 1970s and 80s as Northern soul – songs that featured a mixture of a Top 40 sound with horns and strings.

David and the Giants performing in 2019

In 1969, they achieved regional success in the southeastern US with singles of that genre entitled "Superlove" and "Ten Miles High". Their work of that era was distributed in both the United States and in the United Kingdom. "Superlove", "Ten Miles High" and some of the band's other late sixties singles have appeared on various genre compilations. In the early 1970s, the band performed in concert with Styx, Black Oak Arkansas, Cheech and Chong and Chuck Berry. David Huff was in the studio with The Rolling Stones when they recorded the song, "Brown Sugar", and also spent some time in the studio with artists such as Stevie Wonder and Rod Stewart.

In 1977, the band members converted to Christianity. That same year they released their first Christian album, Song of Songs. Released without label support, it contained ballads and a mixture of pop-rock. Their second album, This One's for You had a similar sound. Two years later, the band recorded Step in My Shoes. Devoid of up-tempo songs, the album was not commercially successful. For their fourth album, the band returned to a sound much closer to their musical roots. Almost Midnight, a rock album, was more successful than the first three. They continued with that sound for their fifth attempt, entitled Heaven or Hell.

=== Commercial peak and decline ===
In the 1980s, the band signed with CBS Priority Records in Nashville. The first release, entitled simply David and the Giants was widely distributed and sold well. The band's next album, Riders in the Sky, contained concert staples like "Riders in the Sky" "Step by Step", "King of the Jews", "Superstar" and "Look at the People". The band released another album called Inhabitants of the Rock, which though not commercially successful, contained the radio releases "I Can Depend on You" and "I Am Persuaded". It went out of print in the early 1990s. Two more albums followed, Under Control and Magnificat. Both were well-received by fans. The band concluded the 1980s with Strangers to the Night and R-U Gonna Stand Up. In 1989, the song "Here's My Heart" from R-U Gonna Stand Up received airplay on heritage CHR/Top 40 station WNCI in Columbus, Ohio, thanks to a mislabeled CD of what was supposed to be a copy of a single from the group Soul II Soul. WNCI program director Dave Robbins liked the song enough to put the song on the air, although they did not know who the artist was at the time. WNCI received such positive response to the song that it was added into regular rotation.

Keith Thibodeaux left the band after recording "R U Gonna Stand Up" in the summer of 1989. In the 1990s, the band was not commercially successful. Though they had three hits from their albums "Stumbling Block to a Stepping Stone", "I'm Still Rocking" and "Always on My Mind", their most successful album had been Angels Unaware. By 1997, the band had been on the road for almost 30 years and decided it was time to do something else. At the end of the year, the band ceased to record and perform together.

=== Band members since 1997 ===
David Huff continued to perform as a solo act and operates a recording studio near Atlanta, Georgia. He released a series of solo albums, including Really in 2000 and Proclaim in 2003 (which was re-released by Christian Records in 2004). Let My Guitar Talk, an instrumental album, was released in 2008. Do You Know What I Mean was released in August 2008.

The Huff brothers occasionally performed together as "David and the Giants". On December 9, 2007, they joined former drummer Keith Thibodeaux for a reunion concert at Emmanuel Praise Church in Monroe, Georgia. They also performed at the 2011 Nashville Amp Expo with guitarist Phil Keaggy, who joined them during their set.

In September 2014, David and the Giants (David Huff, Clayborn Huff, Rayborn Huff and Keith Thibodeaux) released "Still Rockin". The live album was recorded at New Life Church in Pearl, Mississippi, in mid-2013. The CD also features four songs recorded by the band at Huff Recording in Athens, Georgia. The band continued to perform in the U.S. and internationally. In 2017, they performed and were honored by the Jimmie Rodgers Music Foundation to receive The Jimmie Award in Meridian, Mississippi (along with other Mississippi musicians and songwriters such as Steve Forbert and George Soule).

In August 2017, a live concert album and video was recorded in St. Louis, Missouri, celebrating 40 years of David and the Giants music. In September 2018, the band recorded their first full studio album with the original band since 1989. What Are You Waiting For? was released on March 5, 2019. It was recorded with the original lineup of David Huff, Clayborn Huff, Rayborn Huff and Keith Thibodeaux in Athens, Georgia.

== Members ==
- Dennon Dearman – bass guitar (1994–1999)
- Gerald Hagan – piano (1977–1979)
- Owen Hale – drums (1977–1978)
- Clayborn Huff – bass guitar (1963–present)
- David W. Huff – guitar, vocals (1963–present)
- Lance Huff – drums (1989–1999)
- Rayborn Huff – keyboards (1963–present)
- Jerry Parker – drums (1963–1967)
- Bob Gauthier – guitar (1969–1971)
- Friday Nelson – drums (1969)
- David Shelton – drums (1977)
- Gregg Giuffria – keyboards (1971–1972)
- Bobby Torello – drums (1973)
- Mike Jackson – vocals (1974–1977)
- Johnny Hozey – guitar (1974–1977)
- Tommy Aldridge – drums (1972)
- David Morris – bass (1974–1977)
- Norman Stokes – keyboards (1974–1976)
- Tony Taylor – drums (1978)
- Keith Thibodeaux – drums (1969–1977, 1979–1989, 2007–present)

== Discography ==
=== Singles ===
- "Rockin' Robin"/"I'll Always Love You" (1963–1964) – Little David & the Giants (Charm Records)
- "On Bended Knees"/"Someday You're Gonna Be Sorry" (1967) (Amy Records)
- "Ten Miles High"/"I'm Down So Low" (1968) (Crazy Horse Records)
- "Superlove"/"Rolling in My Sleep" (1968) (Crazy Horse)
- "Don't Say No"/"Love 'em and Leave 'em" (1968) (Capitol Records)
- "Super Good Feeling"/"A Letter to Josephine" (1970) (Fame Records)

=== Albums ===
- Song of Songs (1977) (Song of Songs Records)
- This One's for You (1978) (Song of Songs)
- Step in My Shoes (1979) (Song of Songs)
- Almost Midnight (1980) (Song of Songs)
- Heaven or Hell (1981) (Song of Songs)
- David and the Giants (1982) (Priority Records)
- Riders in the Sky (1983) (Priority)
- Inhabitants of the Rock (1984) (Myrrh Records)
- Under Control (1985) (Myrrh)
- Magnificat (1987) (Myrrh)
- Strangers to the Night (1988) (Giant Records)
- R-U Gonna Stand Up (1989) (Giant)
- Distant Journey (1990) (Giant)
- Long Time Coming (1992) (Giant)
- Giant Hits (1993) (Giant)
- Angels Unaware (1995) (Giant/Benson Records)
- Dream (1996) (Giant)
- Still Rockin (2014) (Giant) – David Huff, Clayborn Huff, Rayborn Huff & Keith Thibodeaux
- Live in Pearl David and the Giants (2017) (Giant) – David Huff, Clayborn Huff, Rayborn Huff & Keith Thibodeaux
- The Best Is Yet To Come (2017) (Giant) – 40th anniversary video and audio disc live in St. Louis – David Huff, Clayborn Huff, Rayborn Huff & Keith Thibodeaux
- What Are You Waiting For? (2019) (Giant) – David Huff, Clayborn Huff, Rayborn Huff & Keith Thibodeaux

=== David Huff solo albums ===
- Really (2000) (Giant Records)
- Proclaim (2004) (Giant)
- Let My Guitar Talk (2008) (Giant)
- Do You Know What I Mean (2008) (Giant)
- Living in the Future (2012) (Giant)
- Wait (2013) (Giant)
- Born For This (2016) (Giant)
- Higher Power (2022) (Giant)
