= The Lucy–Desi Comedy Hour =

American TV series

- Created by: Jess Oppenheimer; Madelyn Davis; Bob Carroll Jr.
- Written by: Madelyn Davis (season 1); Bob Carroll Jr. (season 1); Everett Freeman (season 2); Bob Schiller; Bob Weiskopf
- Directed by: Jerry Thorpe (seasons 1-2); Desi Arnaz (season 3)
- Starring: Lucille Ball; Desi Arnaz; Vivian Vance; William Frawley; Little Ricky
- Composer: Wilbur Hatch
- Country of origin: United States
- No. of episodes: 13 (list of episodes)

Production
- Executive producer: Desi Arnaz
- Producer: Bert Granet
- Running time: 60 minutes
- Production company: Desilu Productions

Original release
- Network: CBS
- Release: November 6, 1957 – April 1, 1960

Related
- I Love Lucy (1951–1957)

The Lucy–Desi Comedy Hour is a collection of thirteen black-and-white one-hour specials airing occasionally from 1957 to 1960 (as opposed to the thirty-minute regular series, I Love Lucy). The first five were shown as specials during the 1957–58 television season. The remaining eight were originally shown as part of Westinghouse Desilu Playhouse. Its original network title was The Ford Lucille Ball-Desi Arnaz Show for the first season, and Westinghouse Desilu Playhouse Presents The Lucille Ball–Desi Arnaz Show for the following seasons. The successor to the classic comedy, I Love Lucy, the programs featured the same cast members: Lucille Ball, Desi Arnaz, Vivian Vance, William Frawley, and Little Ricky (billed as Richard Keith in his post-Lucy–Desi acting assignments). The production schedule avoided the grind of a regular weekly series.

Desilu produced the show, which was mostly filmed at their Los Angeles studios with occasional on-location shoots at Lake Arrowhead, Las Vegas, and Sun Valley, Idaho. CBS reran these thirteen specials under the "Lucy–Desi Comedy Hour" title as prime-time summer replacements, from 1962 to 1965, with a final run in 1967. 1966–67 was the first TV season in which all first-run prime time network shows were in color. These "Lucy–Desi" repeats were the only black and white series aired that year, after which it, and I Love Lucy, went into syndication.

== Premise ==
Arnaz was often questioned why he changed the format of I Love Lucy, a weekly, 30-minute program produced at 25 new episodes a season very successfully, to the Comedy Hour format of one-hour specials shown weeks or months apart. He noted at the time:

You've got to change in this business. Lucy is my favorite character ever and I love I Love Lucy[;] it's my favorite show. I'd rather make a big change while we are still ahead. It would be ridiculous for us to wait until people got sick and tired of the regular half-hour every Monday night. We have been the luckiest show on the air, but we've worked for it. I have never worked so hard in my life. And while I suppose it's not really for me to say, I think I can honestly say that we have never done a really bad show in six years.

He also noted the high stakes involved in the cost per episode ($350,000): "They not only have to be good, they have to be great. We're going to be in an awful spot with these shows; they've got to be good."

Arnaz's determination to change scheduling formats went back several years, as far back as 1954. "When I first suggested it, CBS wouldn't listen. Last year (1956) again, they talked me into continuing with the weekly half-hour. But this time (1957) I made up my mind."

Keeping the main plot line of the I Love Lucy program allowed Comedy Hour to retain the main cast. It also allowed Arnaz to drop any hint of continuity by releasing all of the I Love Lucy characters and substituting them with celebrity guest stars. That concept, which proved so successful during the program's Hollywood episodes in seasons 4 & 5, was what Arnaz had in mind when he commented "you can't stand still." Except for the main characters (still played by Ball, Arnaz, Vance, Frawley, and Thibodeaux) one character from I Love Lucy appeared on Comedy Hour: Lucy's mother Mrs. McGillicuddy as Little Ricky's babysitter, in "The Ricardos Go to Japan"; columnist Hedda Hopper played herself in "Lucy Takes a Cruise to Havana" as she had in the season 4 I Love Lucy episode "The Hedda Hopper Story." Arnaz believed the use of celebrity stars would allow him to demand higher fees, take some pressure off himself portraying Ricky Ricardo, and keep the "Lucy" concept fresh by encouraging continued ratings success. Although done during the last season of I Love Lucy, the move to Connecticut allowed the writers to expand possible script ideas as they had "used up every conceivable story line that could be set in the tiny New York apartment."

Not noted publicly at the time, Arnaz was suffering serious health problems, and was ordered by doctors to cut back on his work and acting schedule. When he entered into negotiations with CBS, for a seventh season of I Love Lucy, Arnaz insisted Desilu be allowed to change to the hour format and a monthly production schedule. CBS president William S. Paley would have sued Desilu had Arnaz's health not been an issue but instead agreed to the change. Arnaz quickly found a new sponsor for the 1957–1958 season: Ford Motor Company. Originally Comedy Hour was slated to produce ten original episodes per season. However, due to high production costs Arnaz cut that to eight, then five episodes. Five were produced in season one (1957–1958) and season two (1958–1959) then cut back to three in season three (1959–1960).

== Description and evaluation ==
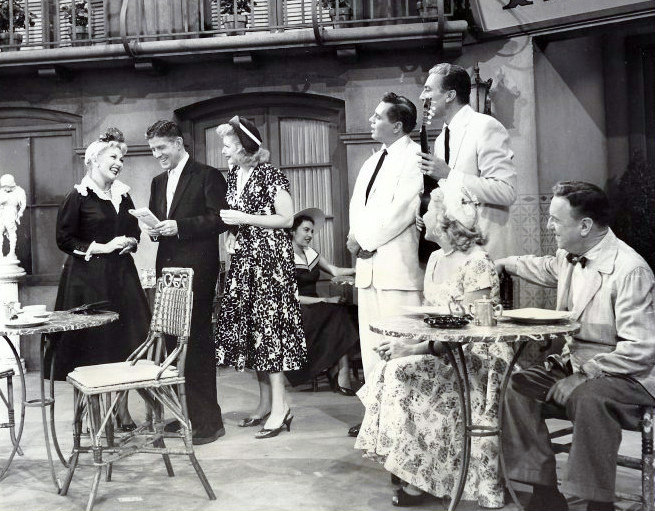
The first episode "Lucy Takes a Cruise to Havana" is an extended flashback of how Lucy met Ricky. L-R: Ann Sothern, Rudy Vallee, Lucille Ball, Desi Arnaz, Cesar Romero, Vivian Vance and William Frawley (1957)

During the final season of I Love Lucy (episode 14), the Ricardos, soon followed by the Mertzes, had moved to Westport, Connecticut, reflecting the growth of the suburbs throughout America during the 1950s. Ricky commuted into New York City where he now owned Club Babalu. A key part of the Comedy Hour format was guest stars in each episode, including Hedda Hopper; Ann Sothern; Rudy Vallee; Cesar Romero; Tallulah Bankhead; Fred MacMurray and June Haver; Betty Grable and Harry James; Fernando Lamas; Maurice Chevalier; Danny Thomas and his Make Room for Daddy co-stars; Red Skelton; Paul Douglas; Ida Lupino and Howard Duff; Milton Berle; Bob Cummings; and, in the final episode, "Lucy Meets the Moustache", Ernie Kovacs and Edie Adams.

Comedy Hour episodes focused on Lucy's interaction with the celebrity guest stars. Although still a key character, Ricky is not a major part of the episodes and has less interaction with Lucy. Nearly every episode features him not allowing her to do something, which allows Lucy to interact with the guest stars to confound Ricky. Ricky's 'manic' personality had changed as well, and by the last episode (aired in April 1960) he is more subtle, and melancholy. His contributions are generally low-key (with the exception of the 'Berle' episode).

Fred and Ethel are featured in fewer plot themes after the move to Connecticut, although Ethel does help Lucy carry out her schemes. Although noted in I Love Lucy as the main reason they were able to afford moving to Connecticut, the joint Ricardo-Mertz egg business is only mentioned once. Fred assumes his role as Ricky's band manager. As noted Arnaz had each episode written to 'stand alone' in order to expand themes and plots using celebrity guests. He also expected those guest stars to have significant screen time. Arnaz, Vance, and Frawley all had their dialog and screen time reduced a great deal compared to I Love Lucy. This reduction was not well received by Vance, who considered leaving. Frawley, however, was happy with the reduction which gave him more time to attend to his other interests.

New friends from the I Love Lucy Connecticut episodes, the Ramseys (or the Mortons), were not in the Comedy Hour cast and are mentioned twice, each as babysitters for Little Ricky. Besides the Mertzes the only character from I Love Lucy to appear on the Comedy Hour was Lucy's mother (who appeared briefly in "The Ricardos Go to Japan").

The first hour had Hedda Hopper in "Lucy Takes a Cruise to Havana". This episode originally ran 75 minutes and Desi had to get permission to air the show intact, cutting into the next show on the network-schedule. After the initial showing on CBS Prime-Time it subsequently was edited down to fit in the 60 minute version that aired during the summers of 1962-1965 and finally 1967.

Little Ricky is used more but is still a minor character. Most of his appearances feature him playing the drums, coming and going (examples include "The Celebrity Next Door" and, in several, off to school or some other function); he has no friends, unlike the 6th season of I Love Lucy, where a few are noted ("Little Ricky Gets Stage Fright", "Little Ricky Learns to Play the Drums", several of the Connecticut episodes, etc.); and no plot theme centers on him. Also the Ricardos do not interact with any neighbors in Westport ("The Celebrity Next Door" is the exception, although Bankhead appears in only that episode and features Lucy's only work with the PTA); and the town, a major plot theme in season 6 of I Love Lucy, is hardly mentioned except in passing.

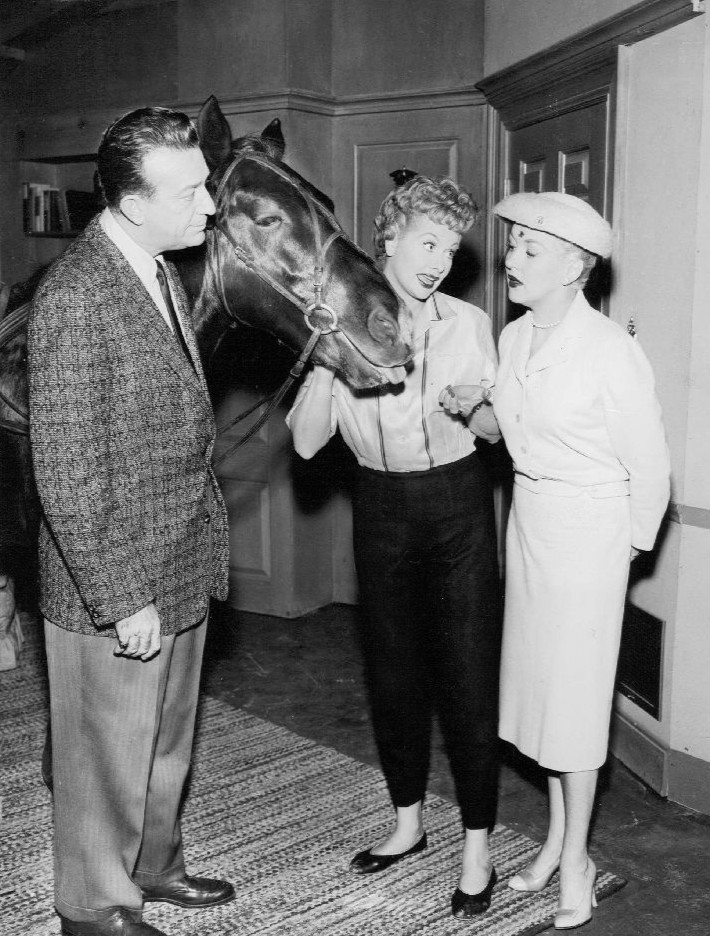
"Lucy Wins a Race Horse", with Harry James and Betty Grable (1958)

Episodes are one hour. Production costs were estimated to be $350,000 per episode. Arnaz had originally proposed to run 10 episodes (one per month) but the high production costs forced Desilu to taper this to 5 episodes each in the 1957–1958, 1958–1959 seasons and 3 in the final season (1959–1960). Arnaz had signed Debbie Reynolds to appear in a season 4 episode to be broadcast in January, 1961 and had been preparing to produce 3 specials for the 1960–1961 season. Ball and Arnaz divorced in May, 1960. After the final Lucy-Desi program the two never worked together onscreen again, although Arnaz executive produced the first 15 of The Lucy Show episodes before leaving Desilu Productions in 1962.

Ratings for each episode broadcast (including reruns) during the 1957–58 and 1958–59 seasons were all good. However, by the start of the 1959–60 season, with the habit of viewing Lucy broken up every few months, being broadcast on different nights, as well as the tension revealed between Ball and Arnaz (due to their real-life marriage unraveling), viewing dropped and it was no longer a major hit in the ratings. Critics commented on the lackluster quality and poor scripts. Cast performances were also panned. The interaction between Ricky and Lucy, a major element of the original program's success, was not up to par (reflecting Ball's and Arnaz's personal problems). Because of these problems (and Desi spending more time trying to maintain Desilu), the live studio audience was replaced with a laugh track by the final season (although both Milton Berle and writer Bob Schiller stated in The Lucy Book by Geoffrey Mark Fidelman, that for the ninth-season premiere, "Milton Berle Hides Out at The Ricardos", a live audience was brought in for some of the scenes to give a sense of timing). In the penultimate episode of the series, titled "The Ricardos Go to Japan", Lucy was red-eyed due to her crying during the arguments between herself and Desi (although not seen on-screen due to the show being filmed in black and white).

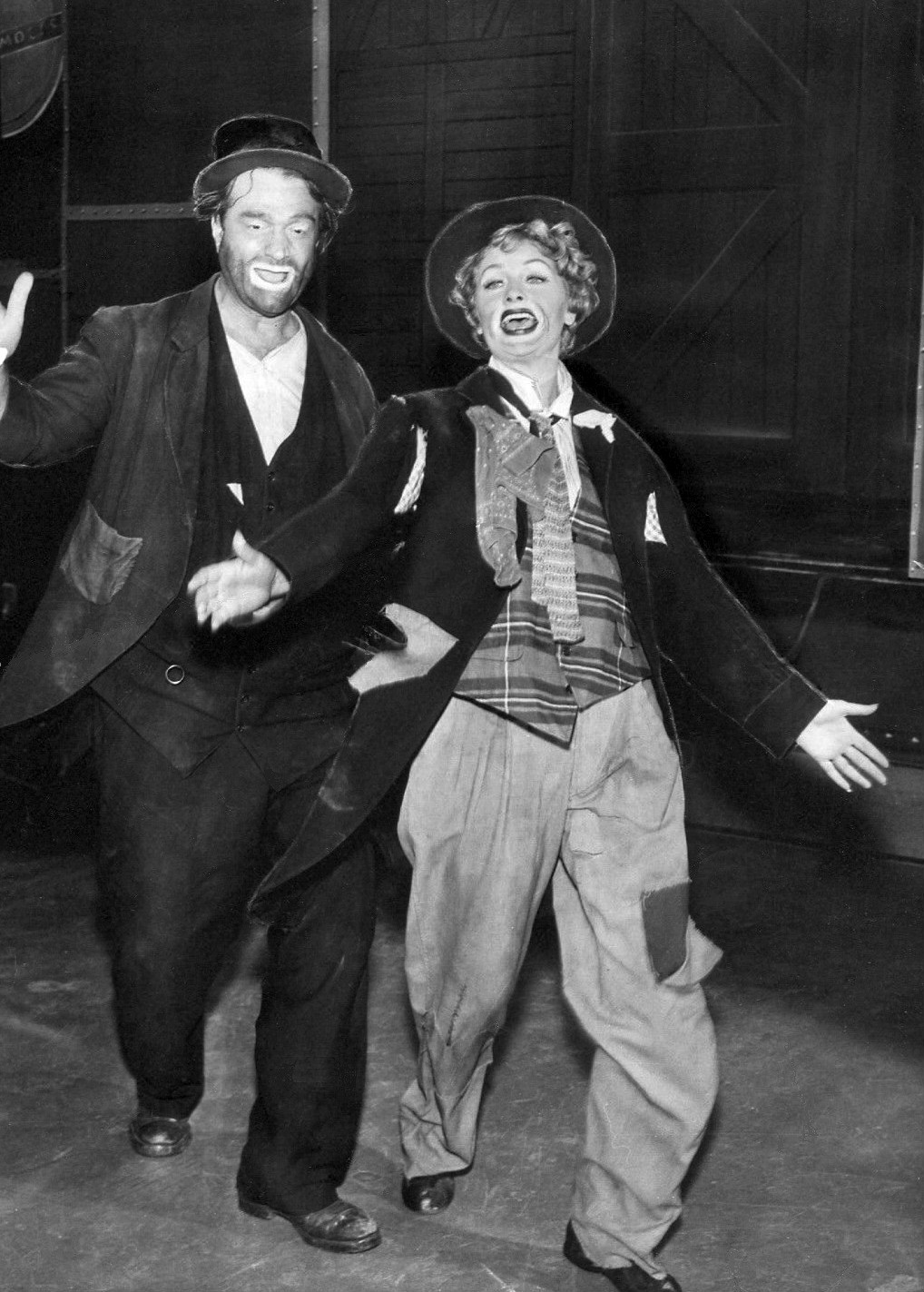
"Lucy Goes to Alaska" with Red Skelton (1959)

While in production of the final episode, "Lucy Meets the Mustache", tensions between them were so high that Ball and Arnaz could not speak to each other without having loud arguments or shouting matches on set. They soon realized it would be best if they did not speak directly to each other there and instead used surrogates to carry messages or questions back and forth. This allowed them time to calm down and stay in character when the script required them to act. Filmed on March 3, 1960, Ball started divorce proceedings the next day. In the final episode, Edie Adams chose to sing "That's All", later commenting that she personally chose the song, unaware of Ball's and Arnaz's marital problems or their pending divorce. Adams and her husband, the avant garde comedian Ernie Kovacs, guest starred on what turned out to be the final new episode ever made of The Lucy–Desi Comedy Hour and the last time its characters, Fred, Ethel, Little Ricky, Ricky, and Lucy would ever be seen. Adams commented that Ball's emotions were up and down the entire week of rehearsals and that she had commented to Kovacs how harshly Ball was treating her. Kovacs passed that along to Arnaz who took Adams aside and explained to her that Lucy was under a lot of pressure and was not feeling very good. And that she should just be herself and not let Ball push her around. She took his advice and things between them were fine. Kovacs never commented publicly about the episode or the famous couple. Adams stated that the mood on set was tense and sad. Although it had yet to be publicly announced, all of the Desilu executives, the cast and crew knew the fate of the stars' marriage and the effect their divorce would have on the series.

Critics have generally regarded the series as a rather pallid continuation of I Love Lucy, with not enough of the original show's brisk pace and memorable sketchwork, and an excessive use of celebrity guest-stars. Still, many fans enjoy the series because of the cast, which remained intact from the original. The Lucy-Desi Comedy Hour is occasionally seen on nostalgia outlets like TV Land in its original hour-long format, or in edited thirty-minute installments (beginning in 1987) as We Love Lucy and run directly after the sixth season of I Love Lucy the additional "episodes" broadcast as a 7th season of I Love Lucy. Me-TV broadcast the program in the original one-hour format during the summer of 2012. The Decades Channel (now Catchy Comedy) ran a weekend binge marathon of Lucy-Desi in August 2015, again in August 2021 and once more in October 2023. It made its debut on Catchy Comedy on January 4, 2025 as part of their "Catchy Loves Lucy" block. With 13 episodes produced and broadcast during its 3-year run the series was released as one DVD box collection separate from the I Love Lucy sets.

The show is briefly memorialized in the Lucille Ball-Desi Arnaz Center in Jamestown, New York.

== Cast ==
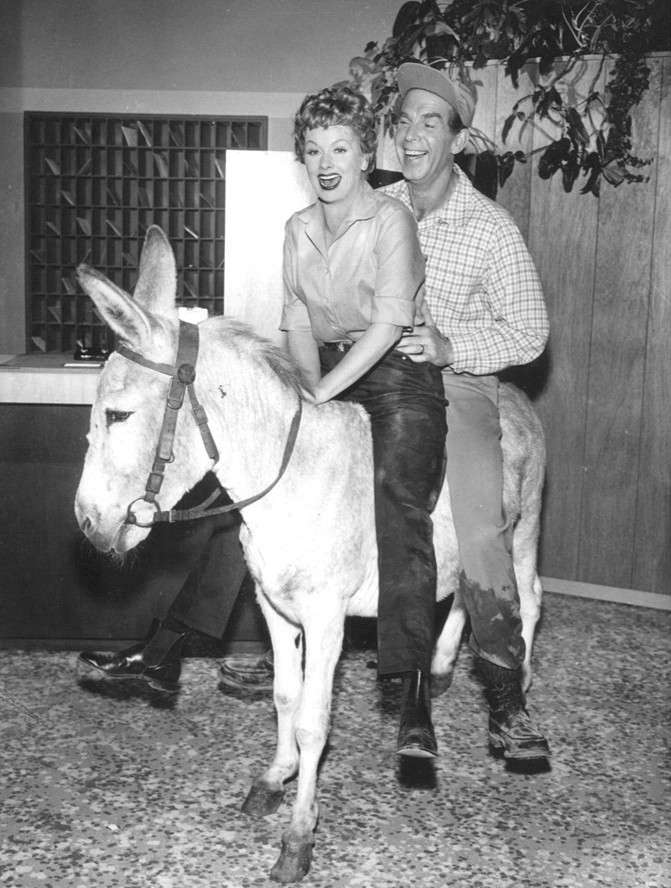
"Lucy Hunts Uranium" with guest star Fred MacMurray (1958)

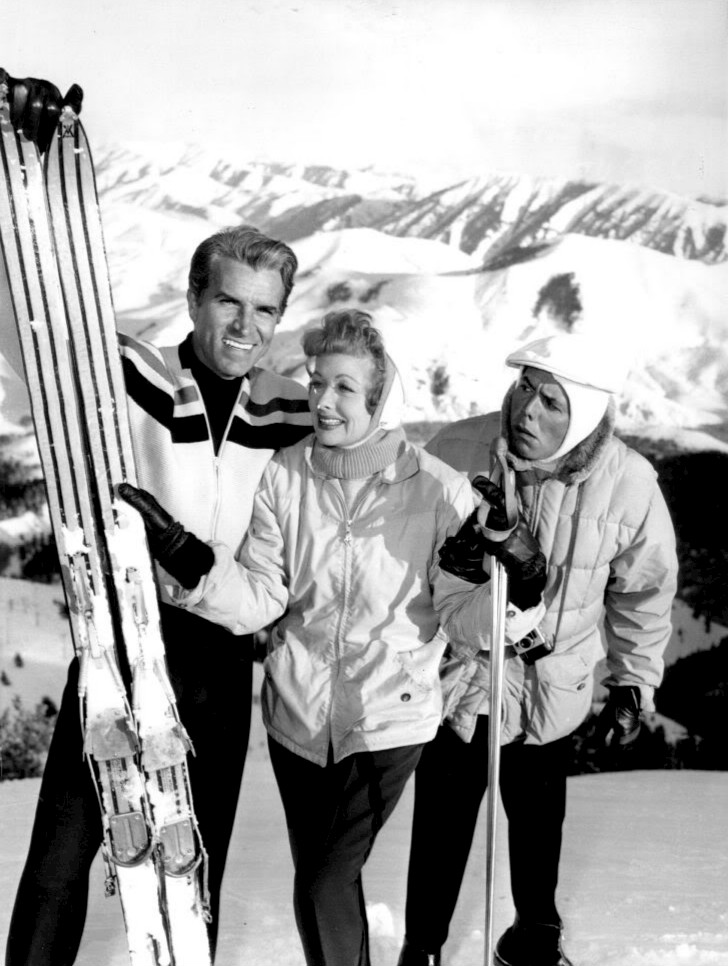
"Lucy Goes to Sun Valley" with guest star Fernando Lamas (1958)

- Lucille Ball as Lucy Ricardo
- Desi Arnaz as Ricky Ricardo
- Vivian Vance as Ethel Mertz
- William Frawley as Fred Mertz
- Keith Thibodeaux, billed as Richard Keith as Ricky Ricardo Jr. (Little Ricky)

== Theme song ==
With the new hour-long show, Desi Arnaz wanted to keep the famous I Love Lucy theme composed by Eliot Daniel, but with some changes. The task of updating the theme fell to music arranger Frank Comstock, who kept most of the theme (like the harp "hits") similar, but added were more syncopation and flourishes, as well as a few "punch" notes. Even though Wilbur Hatch was still musical conductor, studio musicians were employed to record the theme, as the Desi Arnaz Orchestra had been disbanded.

Most, if not all, end credit music themes on each episode have been edited for time in the syndicated versions of the series. However, in 2018 a fan uploaded to YouTube a complete theme song, reconstructed from the different episodes.

== Episodes ==
Jerry Thorpe directed ten, and Desi Arnaz three, of the Comedy Hour episodes. Ball, Arnaz, Vance, Frawley, and Keith appeared in all thirteen episodes.

== Home media ==
CBS DVD (distributed by Paramount Home Entertainment) released the entire series of all thirteen Lucy-Desi Comedy Hour specials on DVD under the package name I Love Lucy: The Final Seasons 7-9 on March 13, 2007, in Region 1, and is presented with certain edits such as "The Celebrity Next Door" when Tallulah Bankhead remarks at the Ricardo's house about being allergic to strawberries (which is a plot point later in the episode) and digitally remastered.

=== Other releases ===
In September 2018, Time Life released a DVD set, Lucy: The Ultimate Collection, which contains 2 episodes of The Lucy-Desi Comedy Hour, and also 32 episodes of I Love Lucy, 24 episodes of Here's Lucy, 14 episodes of The Lucy Show, and 4 episodes of the short-lived ABC series Life with Lucy (which had never before been released to home media), plus a wide variety of bonus features. As of August 2020, the set was no longer available from Time Life.
