= Muriel Cigars =

Cigar brand

- Product type: Cigars
- Current owner: Altadis
- Country: United States
- Introduced: 1912; 114 years ago
- Previous owners: Lorillard Tobacco Company

Muriel Cigars is a brand of machine-rolled cigars, most recently owned by Altadis, a subsidiary of Imperial Brands.

== History ==
The Muriel Cigars brand was established in 1912 by Lorillard Tobacco Company in Jersey City, New Jersey. Muriel Cigars was acquired by Consolidated Cigar Holdings, Inc. in 1956, which in turn merged with Havatampa in 2000 to form Altadis USA.

The first Muriel cover girl, long considered a mystery, was an adult imagining of a child, Muriel Rasmussen Berry, daughter of George and Emma Rasmussen and granddaughter of Dr. Carl Moehle. Moehle was the owner of the lithographic firm that produced the original label. The brand chose a new model in the 1970s in an attempt to maintain relevance in changing times.

Muriel's popularity peaked in the 1950s, but Consolidated continued to market the brand extensively in America throughout the 1960s and 1970s. The brand did $40 million in annual sales by 1973, spending as much as $2.5 million per year on marketing in the 1970s. Muriel Cigars ran television advertisements in the first Super Bowl in 1966. Actress Edie Adams notably worked as a pitch-lady for Muriel Cigars, appearing in multiple commercials throughout the 1950s and 1960s.

== See also ==
- Cigar brands
- Edie Adams, actress and pitch-lady for Muriel Cigars
- Susan Anton, singer in Muriel Cigars commercials
