= The Girls Want to Go to a Nightclub =

- I Love Lucy episode
- Episode no.: Season 1 Episode 1
- Directed by: Marc Daniels
- Written by: Jess Oppenheimer; Madelyn Pugh; Bob Carroll Jr.
- Production code: 102
- Original air date: October 15, 1951

Episode chronology
| ← Previous — | Next → "Be a Pal" |

"The Girls Want to Go to a Nightclub" is the second filmed episode of I Love Lucy but the first one aired. Originally, "Lucy Thinks Ricky Is Trying to Murder Her" was supposed to have been aired instead, as it was the first one filmed, but numerous production problems kept Lucille Ball and Desi Arnaz and others, who had a stake in the success of the program, from airing it until the problems had been fixed. Instead, it was determined that "The Girls Want to Go to the Nightclub" was a better product to introduce the American public to their program. It debuted on CBS on Monday, October 15, 1951 at 9:00 pm sharp.

== Plot summary ==
It is the Mertzes' 18th wedding anniversary, and they and the Ricardos want to do something to celebrate. However, the gentlemen and the ladies have different ideas about what to do. Ricky (Desi Arnaz) and Fred (William Frawley) want to go to a boxing match, but Lucy (Lucille Ball) and Ethel (Vivian Vance) want to go to a nightclub. They argue and are unable to come to an accord. Finally, Lucy announces that she and Ethel will find dates to take them out. The men go downstairs to Fred's apartment where Ricky expresses concern about "what might happen" when the girls go out with other men. Fred agrees it would be a good idea to get dates themselves and go to the nightclub to keep an eye on their wives.

Lucy tries calling up old boyfriends, but most of them are busy, married or, in one case, babysitting a grandson (Lucy explains that when she had dated this fellow, he was an "interesting older man"). Meanwhile, Ricky is in a similar situation, having burned his "little black book" upon marrying Lucy (she had told him that doing this was an American marriage tradition). Finally, Ricky decides to phone a friend, Ginny Jones, who has connections to all the women in town. She agrees to set them up. Lucy also remembers Ginny's connections and phones her for the same reason. Ginny lets Lucy in on the husbands' scheme, and Lucy has an idea. She tells Ginny to arrange dates for Ricky and Fred—but with Ethel and herself. The evening comes around, and Ricky and Fred are anxiously waiting for their dates. The doorbell rings, and it is Lucy and Ethel, dressed in stereotypical hillbilly attire, and calling themselves "Eunice" and "Ma," respectively. Ricky and Fred are shocked and do not realize it is their wives behind the costumes. Ricky is eventually tipped off when Lucy gives herself away by knowing exactly where the cigarettes and matches are. Ricky takes Fred aside, fills him in, and they turn the tables on the women by being overly amorous. Lucy realizes that Ricky has discovered her trick, and the charade is over.

Later that evening finds the couples out celebrating the Mertzes' anniversary—at the fights. "Happy anniversary, Ethel", Lucy sighs. "Thank you, Lucy", Ethel sighs back.

== See also ==
- List of I Love Lucy episodes
