= Ballet Magnificat! =

Christian ballet company

General information
- Name: Ballet Magnificat!
- Year founded: 1986
- Founding artistic director: Kathy Thibodeaux
- Founding Executive Director: Keith Thibodeaux
- Location: Jackson, Mississippi
- Website: www.balletmagnificat.com

Ballet Magnificat! is a professional Christian ballet company founded in Mississippi in 1986 and located in the state capital, Jackson. It has been described as the premiere Christian dance company in the United States, and has spawned numerous dance companies and ministries. The 501(c)(3) non-profit ministry consists of a full-time touring company, pre-professional training program, School of the Arts, Summer Dance Intensive, Jr. Dance Intensive, and Brazil satellite company and school.

Founder and Artistic Director Kathy Thibodeaux was the 1982 silver medalist at the USA International Ballet Competition (held every four years in Jackson, Mississippi). Founder and Executive Director Keith Thibodeaux is a former child actor, best known for portraying “Little Ricky” on the I Love Lucy TV show and drumming for the groundbreaking Christian rock band David and the Giants.

The company's base, Jackson, is the same city as the USA International Ballet Competition.

It is the nation's first professional Christian dance company. It is now considered the benchmark for professional Christian dance around the world, and is credited for its role in restoring dance as a form of worship in the church.

== Touring company ==
Composed of 15 dancers on average, the touring company performs nationally and internationally throughout the year. Their performances are hosted by local sponsors and take place in theaters, universities, churches, and schools. Once or twice a year, the company travels overseas and performs to sold-out audiences. They have performed in over 43 countries. A second professional touring company was added in 2004, Ballet Magnificat! Omega, which toured extensively throughout the US and abroad from 2004 to 2019, merging with the original Alpha Company in August 2019.

== Trainee program ==
The pre-professional training program began in 1996 with three dancers, and today has grown to three levels at the Jackson base. This program feeds dancers into the touring company, and provides training and preparation for work in other ministries and dance companies. The program's events company consists of the most advanced level and travels worldwide throughout the year. The trainee program is recognized by the U.S. Immigration Service as a vocational school, and draws students from across the U.S. and many foreign countries each year.

== School of the Arts ==
In 1989, the ministry opened a School of the Arts in Jackson, which offers dance classes to area students ages 3 through adult. The School consists of Lower and Upper schools, with the Lower School designed for ages 3–7 and Upper School for ages 8 and up. The School also has its own student companies, Magnificat! Youth Ballet and Magnificat! Youth Ballet Junior, which regularly perform at local nursing homes, schools, churches, and area events.

== Brazil satellite ==
Curitiba, Brazil, became home to the first satellite of Ballet Magnificat! in February 2017, beginning with a professional training program and growing to include a performance company and school of the arts.

In 2019, Ballet Magnificat! was welcomed by the mayor of Curitiba, Rafeal Greca. The dance company was also featured in the Curitiba City Hall news.

== Choreographers ==
Ballet Magnificat! uses in-house and guest choreographers to create their unique and original ballets.

== Repertoire ==
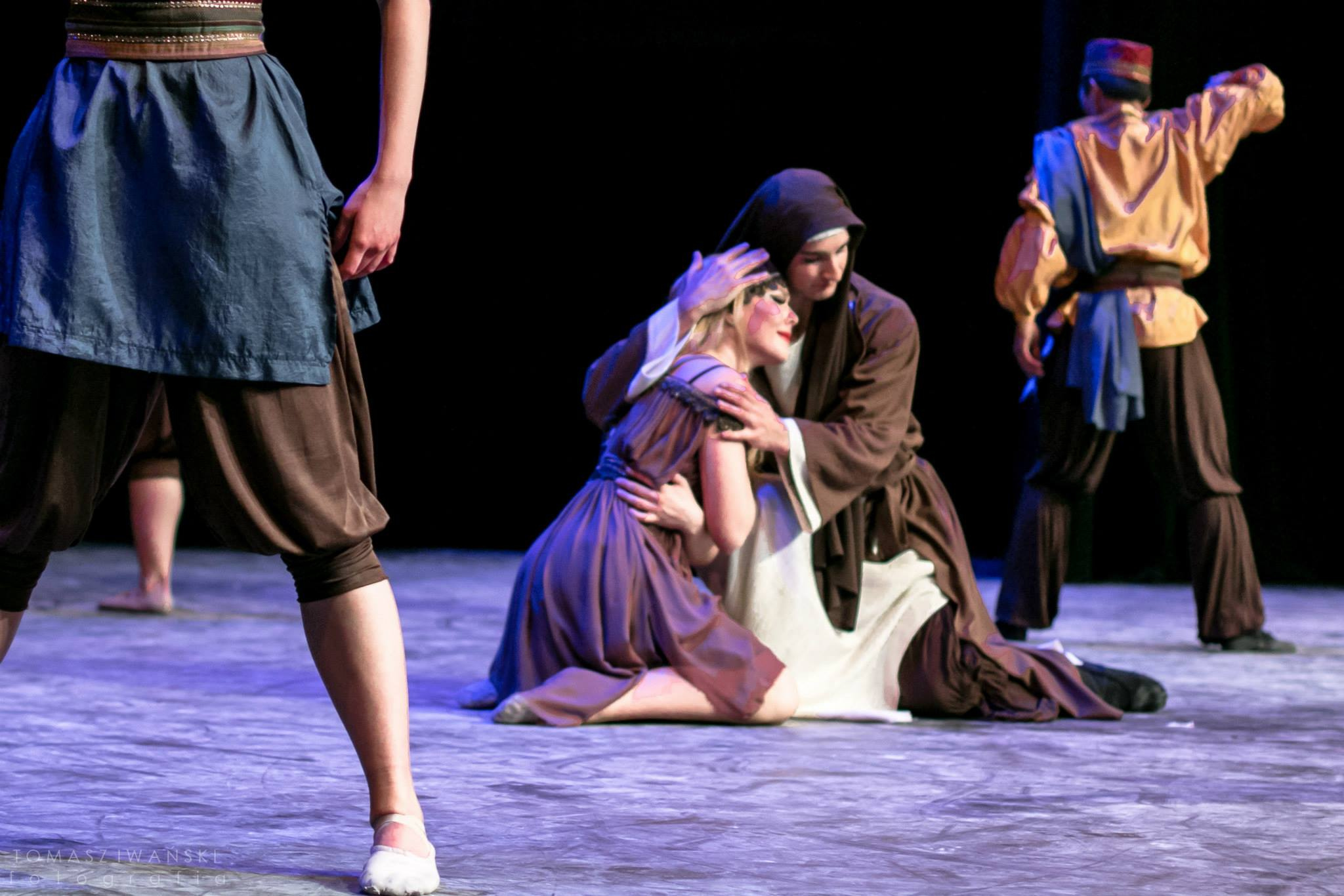
Still from "The Sinful Woman" from a live performance of Face 2 Face

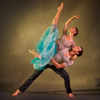
The Arrival

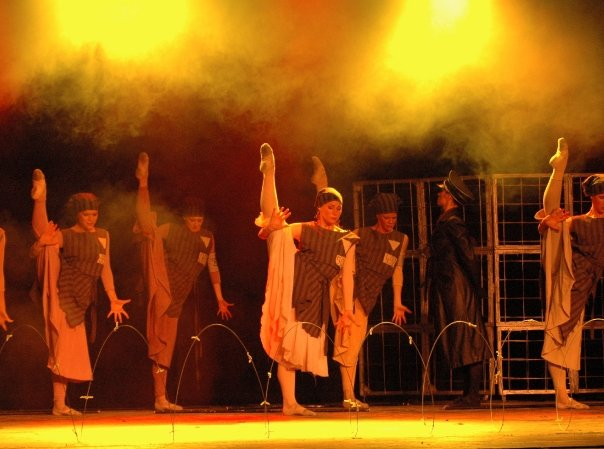
Excerpt from The Hiding Place

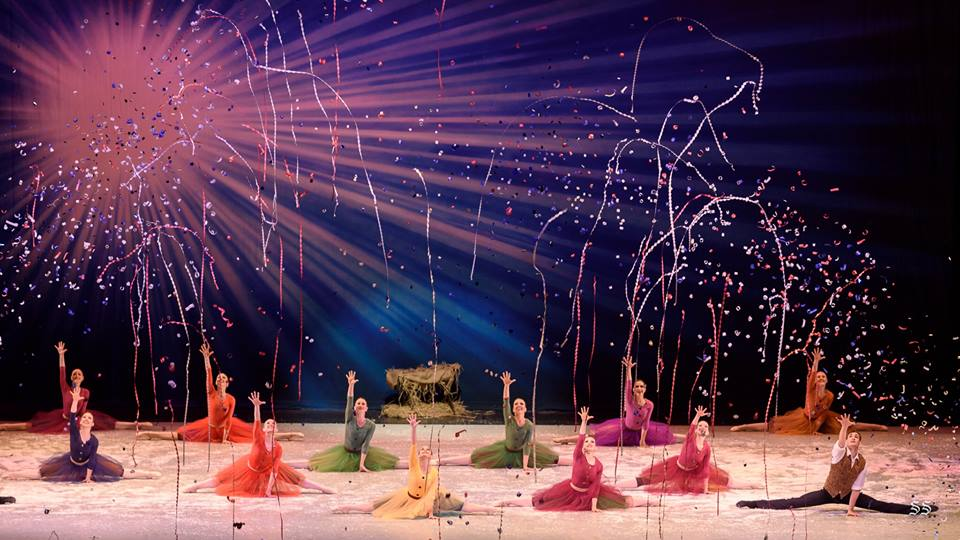
Most Incredible Christmas at Thalia Mara Hall in Jackson

Ballet Magnificat! performs only original works, unusual in the dance world, with most being full-length story ballets.

- The Call (2025)
- Even in the Why (2020)
- A Christmas Carol, the ballet (2019)
- Snow Queen Returns (2018)
- Heaven Come Down (2017)
- Light Has Come (2016)
- Hosea (2015)
- Prodigal's Journey – two-act version (2015)
- Face 2 Face (2013)
- Stratagem (2013)
- Most Incredible Christmas (2012)
- Snow Queen (2011)
- The Arrival (2011)
- Before His Throne (2008)
- Scarlet Cord (2008)
- A Christmas Dream (2006)
- Hiding Place (2006)
- Ruth (2005)
- Journey of the Prodigal Son (2003)
- Selah (2003)
- Freedom (2002)
- Deliver Us (2001)
- Give Me Jesus (2000)
- Emmanuel (2000)
- Basic Instructions (1999)
- Psalms, Hymns, & Spiritual Songs (1997)
- Unveiled Hope (1997)
- Poiema (1997)
- Lord Of All (1997)
- Saviour (1996)
- Known by the Scars (1996)
- God Gets the Glory (1995)
- Veni, Sancte Spiritus (1994)
- God will Make a Way (1993)
- Sanctuary (1992)
- God of Life (1992)
- Praise Magnificat ( 1992)
- My Father’s World (1991)
- Forever Changed ( 1991)
- A Christmas Festival (1991)
- Thy Kingdom Come (1989)
- Joy (1989)
- Light Eternal (1989)
- Regathering (1988)
- Hebrew (1988)
- Doulos (1988)
- The Calling (1987)
- Creation (1987)
- Painter (1986)
- Sandi Songs (1986)
- Bach (1986)
