= Keith Thibodeaux (American football) =

American football player (born 1974)

No. 32, 26, 27, 22
- Position: Cornerback

Personal information
- Born: May 16, 1974 (age 52); Opelousas, Louisiana, U.S.
- Listed height: 5 ft 10 in (1.78 m)
- Listed weight: 189 lb (86 kg)

Career information
- High school: Beau Chêne
- College: Northwestern State (LA)
- NFL draft: 1997: 5th round, 140th overall pick

Career history
- Washington Redskins (1997); Atlanta Falcons (1999); Minnesota Vikings (1999–2001); Green Bay Packers (2001)

Career NFL statistics
- Tackles: 72
- Passes defended: 7
- Interceptions: 2
- Stats at Pro Football Reference

Keith Trevis Thibodeaux (born May 16, 1974) is an American former professional football player who was a cornerback in the National Football League for four teams from 1997 to 2001. He played college football for the Northwestern State Demons and was selected in the fifth round of the 1997 NFL draft.
