= Richard Keith (actor) =

American actor and musician

Keith Thibodeaux
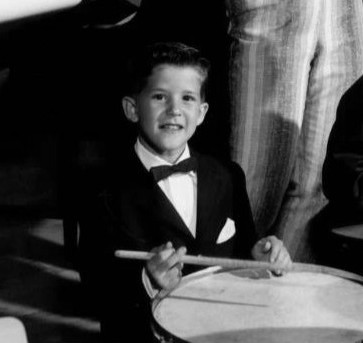
- Thibodeaux in 1960, age 10
- Born: Keith Thibodeaux; December 1, 1950 (age 75); Lafayette, Louisiana, U.S.
- Occupations: Actor; musician
- Years active: 1952–present
- Spouse: Kathy Denton (m. 1976)
- Relatives: Bryce Drew (son-in-law)

Keith Thibodeaux (born December 1, 1950), also known as Richard Keith, is an American actor and musician, best known for playing Little Ricky on the television sitcoms I Love Lucy and The Lucy–Desi Comedy Hour. He was billed as Richard Keith because his Cajun French last name, "Thibodeaux", was considered too hard to pronounce by producer Desi Arnaz. He is the last living regular appearing cast member from I Love Lucy.

== Career ==
=== I Love Lucy ===
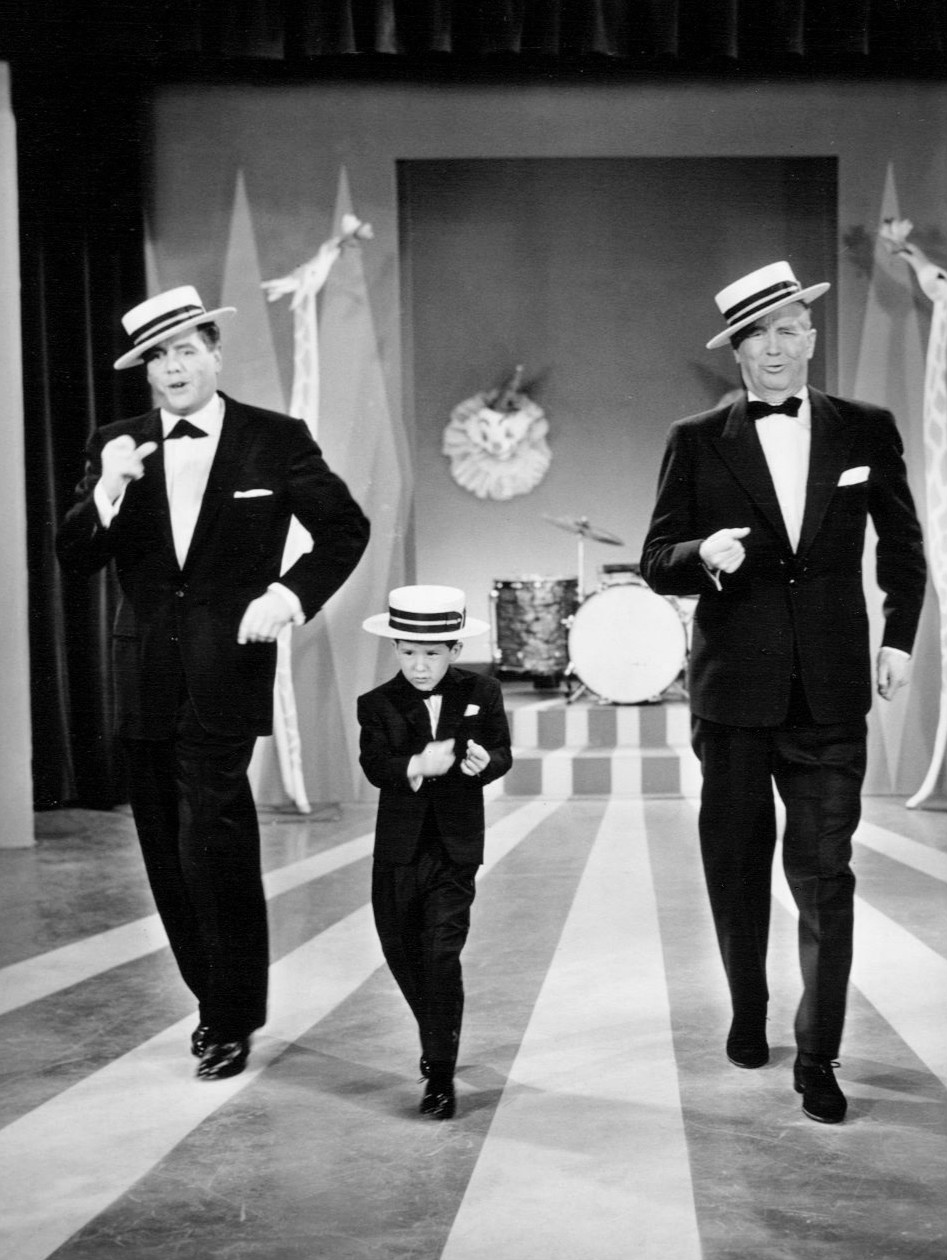
Desi Arnaz, Richard Keith, and Maurice Chevalier from The Lucy–Desi Comedy Hour episode "Lucy Goes to Mexico", 1958

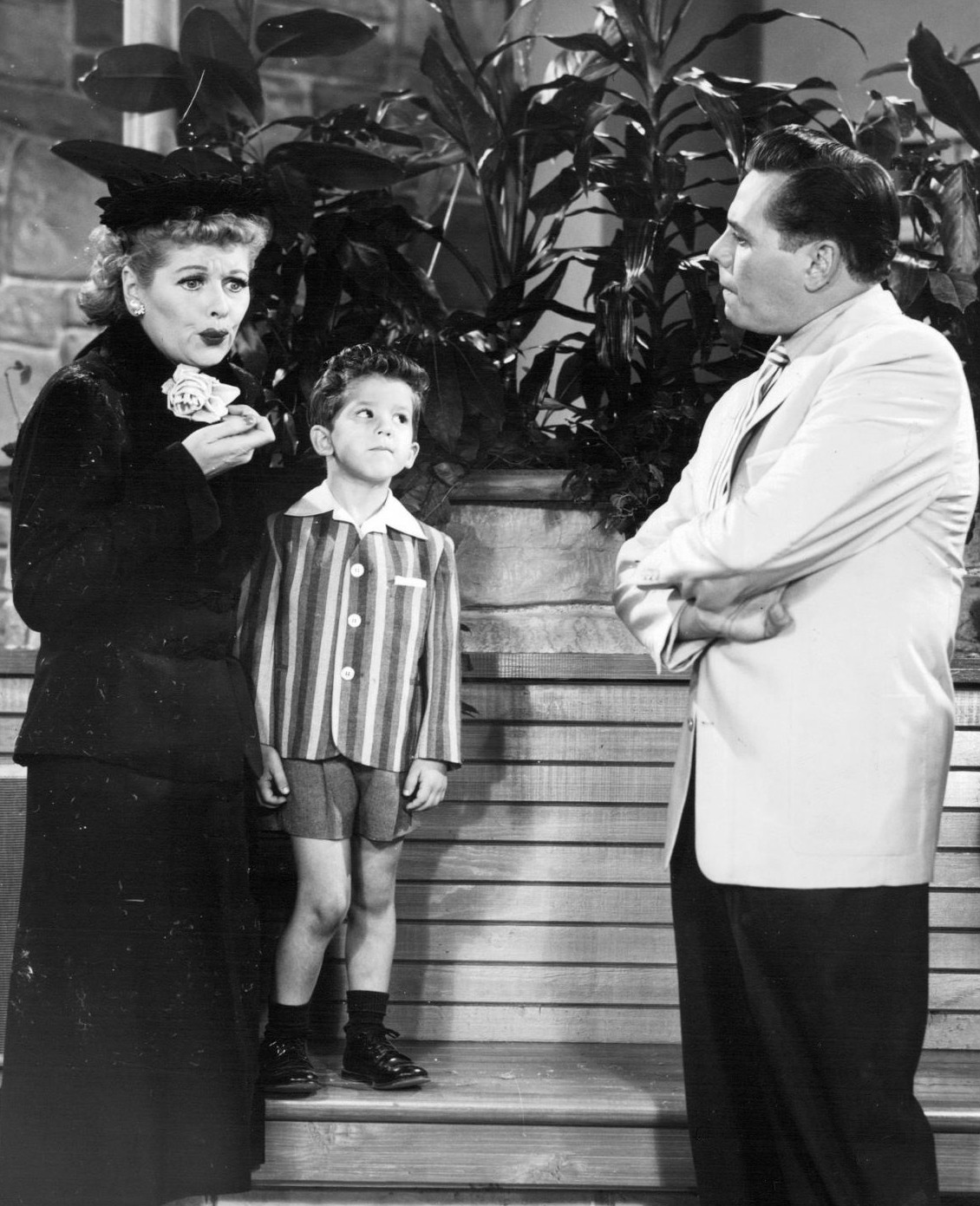
With Lucille Ball and Desi Arnaz on the set of the I Love Lucy episode "Off to Florida", 1956

Thibodeaux showed skill on the drums at a young age, and was making $500 ($6,017 in 2025 dollars) a week at the age of 3 while touring with the Horace Heidt Orchestra. His father took him to audition for the part of Little Ricky in 1955, "I walked on the set and there was Lucy, she was standing there and she was looking at me," he said. "She said 'OK he's cute, but what does he do?' My dad said, 'Well he plays the drums' and she said, 'Oh, come on--I can't believe that.' Then, she says 'Look, we have a drum set over there, go ahead and let him play.' Eventually Desi Arnaz himself came over and started jamming with me on the drums and then he kind of stood up and said 'Well, I think we found Little Ricky.'"

According to Lucie Arnaz, who was interviewed on the TV show Archive of American Television, he became like part of the family. "For a long time I thought Keith was related to us, because he went everywhere with us. Desi (Jr.) considered him his best friend and [Keith] was responsible for teaching him the drums. He came over to our house on many weekends and traveled with them during the summer. My mother kind of adopted him. He is in all of our home movies and photographs growing up and was a great kid, and still is."

In 1964, Thibodeaux appeared for a split second in an episode of The Lucy Show titled "Lucy is a Process Server." Initially he was featured in a comedic sequence at a train station in which a vending machine malfunctions. However, the scene was cut when the show ran too long. After the episode was edited, Thibodeaux is only seen for a moment, entering the station. Nevertheless, Thibodeaux remained in the credits listed as Richard Keith, the actor who played "Little Boy."

=== Other TV appearances ===
As a child, he made 13 appearances on The Andy Griffith Show, between 1962 and 1966, usually as Opie's friend "Johnny Paul Jason" and as “Carter French” in an early episode. He later described The Andy Griffith Show set as a far more laid-back and pleasant experience compared to I Love Lucy, though due to age differences between himself and Ron Howard, he never grew as close to that show's cast as he did to the Arnaz family. He also accepted small roles on other popular television shows.

=== Music career ===
In 1969, Thibodeaux joined the rock group David and the Giants who were based in Laurel, Mississippi. The group recorded in its early years with Capitol Records, Fame Records, and Crazy Horse Records, primarily touring throughout the South, and enjoyed a few regional hits which were recorded in Muscle Shoals, Alabama, and were well known in the Northern Soul music scene in England. After turning 21 in 1971, Thibodeaux received a final payment of $8,000 from a trust fund set up during his days on I Love Lucy.

Thibodeaux developed a drug problem and eventually left the band, which broke up soon after. He became a born again Christian in 1974. The band leader, David Huff, and other members later converted. The group got back together. The band released a number of albums in the 1980s and 1990s for CBS Priority Records (Epic Records), The Benson Company, ABC Word Records (Myrrh) label, and the band's own label Giant Records. They released a CD in 2014 titled Still Rockin. A live David and the Giants album, The Best Is Yet To Come, and a DVD of the live performance, was recorded and released in August 2017, which marked the band's 40th anniversary. The band was honored in 2017, along with other notable Mississippi musicians such as Steve Forbert, Tammy Wynette, George Soule, and Elvis Presley, by receiving "The Jimmie" Mississippi Dreamers (Jimmie Rodgers Award) for their musical contributions as Mississippi artists at a special concert at Peavey Electronics Corporate headquarters in Meridian, Miss., along with Hartley Peavey.

In 1990, Thibodeaux became the executive director for his wife's company, Ballet Magnificat! which tours nationally and internationally. In 2017 the couple launched the Ballet Magnificat! Brasil dance company and trainee program headquartered in Curitiba, Brazil.

== Personal life ==
Raised as a Roman Catholic, Thibodeaux went to school at St. Victor's elementary in West Hollywood and St. Jane Frances de Chantal School in North Hollywood. He attended Notre Dame High School in Sherman Oaks for two years before his parents separated in 1966.

After his parents separated, Keith, his mother, and siblings moved back to Lafayette, Louisiana. He graduated from Lafayette High School where he continued to play drums in rock and rhythm and blues bands. He left Louisiana for Mississippi in late 1969 after going to college for a short period where he said he "majored in drinking beer and playing pool" to pursue a career with the band David and the Giants.

In 1976, he met and married ballet dancer Kathy Denton in Jackson, Mississippi. The couple moved briefly to Southern California in 1977 where he was asked to join the pop band Starbuck notable for the late 1970s hit "Moonlight Feels Right".

Thibodeaux's autobiography Life After Lucy was published in 1994.
