= The Thought Exchange =

2011 self-help book by David Friedman

The Thought Exchange: Overcoming Our Resistance To Living A Sensational Life is a self-help book written by David Friedman, published in 2011. A response to the law of attraction, it claims that positive thinking techniques and self-help books cannot work unless the person becomes aware of his/her physical sensations and is willing to experience them. The book also suggests that we are invisible 'avatars' who experience the world by noticing sensations and thoughts. The book was promoted on the Today Show in April 2011. The methods mentioned in the Thought Exchange are also taught by Friedman in New Thought Churches across the United States.

== Documentary film ==
The book became the influence for the 2012 film by the same title. The film was directed by Usher Morgan and starred Friedman, Lucie Arnaz, Arje Shaw and others. The film received a few positive reviews on Rotten Tomatoes and was widely reviewed by various self-help and spiritual bloggers The film was released Straight-to-DVD in May 2012.
