= The Thought Exchange (film) =

- Directed by: Usher Morgan
- Produced by: Usher Morgan
- Starring: David Friedman; Lucie Arnaz; Arje Shaw; Colleen McGloin
- Edited by: Ricky Monroe
- Distributed by: Digital Magic Entertainment
- Release date: March 15, 2012
- Running time: 92 minutes
- Country: United States
- Language: English

The Thought Exchange is a 2012 New Thought Documentary Film based on a book by the same name, it was the directorial debut of Usher Morgan who also produced the film. The film stars David Friedman and Lucie Arnaz among others who appeared on the film and testified to the concepts taught by Friedman throughout the film, this was the first film ever released by Digital Magic Entertainment.

== Plot and development ==
The Thought Exchange serves as a condensed introduction to the methods taught by David Friedman in his Thought Exchange book. The film uncovers methods of successfully implemented the Law of Attraction by a more comprehensive understanding of reality and how sensations are used to influence "deliberate creation", or as the film refers to as "manifestation". The film claims that human sensations are the leading factor in the success or failure of visualizations when one is attempting to "manifest" a change in their life or their way of thinking. The film also discusses matters of reality, mind over matter, causality and the role of the observer in human beings as spiritual avatars.

After the release of David Friedman's book, Usher Morgan acquired the rights and developed the film with Friedman who also stars in the film. Many of the subjects who appear in the film are individuals who claim to follow the Thought Exchange principles and have used it to finally get the Law of Attraction to work in their life.

== Critical reception ==
The film received mostly positive reviews in the media and by New Thought bloggers, Mark Bell of Film Threat gave the film 3 and a half (of five) stars and wrote: "I think The Thought Exchange is an intriguing concept, and deserving of more attention and thoughtful scrutiny than I’m able to give it based solely on a film review." Critic MichiGal wrote: "It is a thought-provoking learning experience, and I look forward to watching it again". Critics with Movie Sleuth wrote: "While the movie is much in the same realm as The Secret, the film is much lighter and doesn't feel like it's twisting your arm." Nick DeNitto, a film critic with Festival of Films gave the film a negative review: "There are many people who can watch The Thought Exchange and walk away with a new view of the world and a refreshing new start on life, but I wasn’t one of those people. Friedman’s theories aren’t ludicrous, but they lack a sense of universality that makes them useful."
