= Pickings (film) =

- Theatrical release poster
- Directed by: Usher Morgan
- Produced by: Usher Morgan
- Starring: Elyse Price; Katie Vincent; Joel Bernard; Joe Trombino; Emil Ferzola; Yaron Urbas
- Cinematography: Louis Obioha
- Production companies: Digital Magic Entertainment; Dark Passage Films
- Release date: March 2, 2018
- Running time: 102 minutes
- Country: United States
- Language: English
- Budget: $350,000

Pickings is a 2018 independent crime film written, produced, and directed by Usher Morgan. The film stars Elyse Price, Joel Bernard, Katie Vincent, Joe Trombino, Emil Ferzola, Yaron Urbas and Taso Mikroulis. Price plays Jo Lee-Haywood, a mysterious bar owner defending her family and business from the wrath of a short-tempered mobster and his protection racket. The film was released to theaters in the United States on March 2, 2018.

== Cast ==
- Elyse Price as Jo Lee-Haywood
- Katie Vincent as Scarlet Lee-Haywood
- Joel Bernard as Boone Pickens
- Samantha Zaino as Emma Lee-Haywood
- Joe Trombino as Jimmy Marcone
- Michael Gentile as Momo
- Michael Tyler as Tommy
- Emil Ferzola as Leo DeVitto
- Taso Mikroulis as Marvin Lee-Haywood
- Yaron Urbas as Sam "Hollywood" Barone
- Bill Turner as Yates

== Production ==
Pickings is Usher Morgan's first feature film. Morgan wrote the script and served as the film's director, producer and chief editor. The film was shot for a total of 35 days over the course of a year. The production of the film was announced during a press event at the 2015 Manhattan Film Festival and a pitch trailer was subsequently released on August 7, 2015, in a press release by Digital Magic Entertainment.

Morgan partnered with his Prego cinematographer Louis Obioha, and re-hired Katie Vincent to play the role of Scarlet. As production evolved, Vincent's role in the film became more substantial and she joined the project as a producer. Vincent also wrote and performed many of the film's original songs and served as the film's music supervisor. Morgan also hired Prego actor Taso Mikroulis to play the role of Marvin. The film was fully financed by Morgan, after an Indiegogo campaign failed to reach its desired goal. "I used my own money to fund this film. Took loans, sold assets and maxed out credit cards," Morgan said in an interview with the Huffington Post in 2018.

Principal photography was held in the New York City area under a $350,000 budget; the film was shot in Yonkers, Staten Island, Southampton and New York City for a total of 35 days over the course of a year. Digital Magic Entertainment released the film's Red Band teaser on December 20, 2016, and the Green Band teaser on March 5, 2017. Both trailers are accompanied by an original musical track recorded by Katie Vincent. The film's official trailer was released on December 18, 2017.

Pickings premiered at the AMC Loews in New York City's Lincoln Square on February 22, 2018, and was subsequently released to theaters on March 2, 2018. The distribution was handled by Dark Passage Films and AMC Independent.

== Critical response ==
Pickings received generally positive reviews and holds an 80% score on Rotten Tomatoes

Gary Goldstein with the Los Angeles Times gave the film a very positive review, writing: "The visually arresting, wickedly entertaining crime drama Pickings marks an impressive narrative feature directing debut."

Maitland McDonagh with the Film Journal praised Morgan's directorial style but was critical of the film's handling of its original characters, writing "it's dazzling and all the more impressive because it was executed on an incredibly low budget. What it isn't especially strong on is original characterization. Price's Jo is impressively tough and convincingly wounded, but she's a still a variation on Kill Bill's lethal bride."

Wesley Lara with Hidden Remote magazine gave the film a favorable review, but criticized some of the characters in the film as "off-the walls crazy" and "a little cheesy". She wrote: "Pickings will definitely not be a film for everyone. This film is incredibly unapologetic in its presentation and homage to previous westerns and noir films and that may turn some people off. It's not an insult, it's just a fact of life. However, the sheer creativity and passion behind this project is undeniable, from its gorgeous cinematography and lighting to its energetic acting (along with an accolade-worthy performance from Elyse Price) to its character driven story. Usher Morgan wanted to create a film that was equals parts completely badass and substance with a fun and emotional oddball of a western/noir hybrid."
