= Usher Morgan =

American film producer

- Born: Usher Morgan; May 23, 1985 (age 41); Yokneam Illit, Israel
- Occupations: Film director and producer

Usher Morgan (born May 23, 1985) is an Israeli-American screenwriter, film director, producer, author and entrepreneur based in New York City. He is best known as the writer, director, and producer of films such as Prego and Pickings and the upcoming indie film Plucked.

== Biography ==
Usher Morgan was born in Israel. He immigrated to the United States in his early twenties.

== Business and media career ==
He founded companies in the publishing, real estate and film production industries. After experimenting with film production and distribution, Morgan began showing interest in directing his own films. His first film was a documentary entitled The Thought Exchange, starring David Friedman and Lucie Arnaz, it was released in New York City in 2012.

Morgan's first narrative directorial debut, a comedy short film entitled Prego was written with the help of Seinfeld writer Andy Cowan. It won the Best Comedy Short Award at the 2015 Manhattan Film Festival, Best Comedy Short Award at the 2015 Chain NYC Film Festival, 2 awards from the 2015 Indie Fest Film Festival, and the Best Comedy award at the 2015 Trinity International Film Festival.

Morgan's first feature film, Pickings was filmed in New York City in 2016 and was released to U.S. theaters in 2018. Morgan's directing style is influenced primarily by film-noir and spaghetti westerns. it holds an 83% score on Rotten Tomatoes with a low audience score of 54%.

In 2018, Morgan wrote and published Lessons from the Set: A DIY Guide to Your First Feature Film, from Script to Theaters detailing his experience in writing, directing, and distributing his debut film.

In April 2021, Morgan announced his second feature film, Plucked, which he co-wrote, co-directed, and co-produced with Katie Vincent. The film stars Vincent alongside J. Anthony Crane, Catherine Curtin, and Susan Gallagher. The film is scheduled for a limited theatrical release in the United States in November 2026..

== Filmography ==
- Prego (2015)
- Pickings (2018)
- Windblown (2020)
- Dual Action (2021)
- Homebound (2021)
- Plucked (2026)
- Anna's in the Woods (TBD)
