= David Friedman (composer) =

American film and theatre composer, songwriter and author (born 1950)

- Born: David Allen Friedman; 1950 (age 75–76); New York City, New York, United States
- Occupations: Film and Theater composer Songwriter; Author; Lyricist; Conductor; Public speaker

David Allen Friedman (born 1950) is an American film and theatre composer, songwriter, author, lyricist and conductor based in New York City. He received a 1997 Backstage Bistro Award for Composer of the Year and a 1997 Johnny Mercer Award for Songwriter of the Year, and a Special Lifetime Achievement Award at the 26th Annual MAC Awards. His oratorio, King Island Christmas, won a Frederick Loewe Award and Dramatists Guild Award. David's musical Desperate Measures won the 2018 Drama Desk Award for Best Music and Best Lyrics (Peter Kellogg) as well as the Outer Critic's Circle Award for Best Off Broadway Musical and the Off Broadway Alliance Award for Best Musical.

== Career ==
=== Original songs ===
Friedman's original songs include "Listen to My Heart", "Help Is On the Way", "We Can Be Kind", "We Live on Borrowed Time", "I'll Be Here With You", "Just in Time for Christmas" (with David Zippel), and "My Simple Christmas Wish". In January 2003, Friedman published the music book Listen to My Heart: The Songs of David Friedman through his publishing firm Midder Music. The book features 63 Friedman songs, including "Listen to My Heart", "We Live On Borrowed Time", "We Can Be Kind", "Help is on the Way", "Your Love", "Trust the Wind", "My Simple Christmas Wish", and "I'll Be Here With You". Following upon the book, Friedman in October 2003 debuted his musical review by the same name.

=== Disney ===
Friedman was conductor of the music scores for Disney's animated features, including Beauty and the Beast, Aladdin, Pocahontas, The Hunchback of Notre Dame, and was vocal contractor for Mulan. Songs written by Friedman have been featured in the Disney film Aladdin and the King of Thieves, The Lizzie McGuire Movie, Bambi 2, in the movie Salsa and in three animated television series; Happy Ness, Sky Dancers, and Dragon Flyz.

=== Television ===
Friedman is a regular on the Today Show "Everyone Has a Story" series, and partners with Kathie Lee Gifford to write a new song each month, which he performs with a current Broadway star on the first Thursday of each month.

=== Theater ===
Friedman has also worked in theatre, on several Broadway musicals, serving as musical director for such original Broadway productions such as Saravá, Joseph and the Amazing Technicolor Dreamcoat, Song & Dance and Beauty and the Beast.

Friedman is the composer of 4 musicals with Tony Award Nominated book writer/lyricist Peter Kellogg. Nicolette & Aucassin, based upon the 13th Century romance Aucassin et Nicolette, has been produced at locations such as the Little Shubert Theatre in New York City, the Westport Country Playhouse, and the Prince Music Theater in Philadelphia.

A Christmas oratorio called King Island Christmas, written with librettist Deborah Brevoort, has had over 40 productions worldwide. Friedman was also co-composer, with David Pomeranz and Kathie Lee Gifford, of the musical Scandalous: The Life and Trials of Aimee Semple McPherson about the life of Aimee Semple McPherson, which debuted in 2005 as Saving Aimee and reached Broadway in 2012.

In 2009, he released a musical play Stunt Girl, (now titled "Front Page Girl") in association with author/lyricist Peter S. Kellogg, and developed in association with the Village Theatre in Seattle, based on the life of Nellie Bly. This was a project worked on together by Kellogg and Friedman for 10 years.

Friedman and Kellogg's Desperate Measures, and all-verse Western musical comedy based on William Shakespeare's Measure for Measure premiered Off-Broadway at the York Theatre in 2017. The show was extended three times and currently holds a 91% rating at Show-Score.

David is currently working on Temple, a musical about the life of Temple Grandin, in collaboration with Elizabeth Dewberry.

David's Web series, "Koga and Family," in collaboration with Philip Kholos, is designed to help young children deal with everyday challenges through martial arts, meditation and kindness.

=== Other ===
Friedman also wrote two songs for Barney's Great Adventure, the 1998 film, based the PBS Kids television series Barney & Friends.

In 2006, Friedman worked in the music department for World Trade Center, a biopic film based on the September 11, 2001 attacks starring Nicolas Cage.

== The Thought Exchange ==
Friedman is the creator of a metaphysical method called "The Thought Exchange", and in 2011 published a book by the same name. Friedman appeared in the 2012 documentary film The Thought Exchange, based on the book. The film was directed by Usher Morgan and starred Lucie Arnaz, Arje Shaw and others. In his book, Friedman admits to being diagnosed with severe agoraphobia at age 20. His being hospitalized for treatment was an experience which motivated him to create the Thought Exchange concept at a later age.

== Personal life ==
Friedman's romantic partner since 2003 is Shawn Moninger, a four time MAC Award-winning technical director, Unity minister, and emerging cabaret performer. They live in Connecticut.
