= Listen to My Heart (Nancy LaMott album) =

Listen To My Heart

Studio album by Nancy LaMott
- Released: December 12, 1995
- Recorded: March 1995
- Genre: Pop
- Label: Midder Music
- Producer: David Friedman, Peter Matz

Nancy LaMott chronology
Just in Time for Christmas (1994)	Listen To My Heart (1995)	What's Good About Goodbye? (1996)

Listen to My Heart is an album by Nancy LaMott, released in 1995. The title track, which was written by David Friedman, became LaMott's signature tune.

LaMott recorded the album in two days, after postponing a hysterectomy needed because of uterine cancer. The album has sold more than 100,000 copies.

== Critical reception ==
The New York Times wrote: "A grown-up girl-next-door with a sweet throb of a voice and a classicist's respect for the outlines of a song, LaMott comes as close as anyone nowadays to being a songwriter's ideal interpreter."

== Track list ==
No.	Title	Writer(s)	Length
1.	"Listen to My Heart"	David Friedman	4:15
2.	"It Feels Like Home"	John Bucchino	3:37
3.	"The Lady Down the Hall"	Annie Dinerman	3:36
4.	"Have You Got Any Castles, Baby?"	Johnny Mercer; Richard Whiting	2:51
5.	"Not Exactly Paris"	Russell George; Michael Leonard	4:05
6.	"We Can Be Kind"	David Friedman	4:40
7.	"I Got the Sun in the Morning"	Irving Berlin	4:04
8.	"Out of This World"/"So in Love"	Johnny Mercer; Harold Arlen; Cole Porter	6:33
9.	"The Secret o' Life"	James Taylor	4:31
10.	"The Summer Knows"/"Summer Me Winter Me"	Alan Bergman; Marilyn Bergman; Michel Legrand	5:46
11.	"Ordinary Miracles"	Alan Bergman; Marilyn Bergman; Marvin Hamlisch	3:42
12.	"I'll Be Here With You"	David Friedman	4:03
Total length:			51:43
