= CARTS =

CARTS is an abbreviation that may refer to:

- Capital Area Rural Transportation System
- Chautauqua Area Rural Transit System
