= Buffalo and South Western Railroad =

Railroad in New York, United States

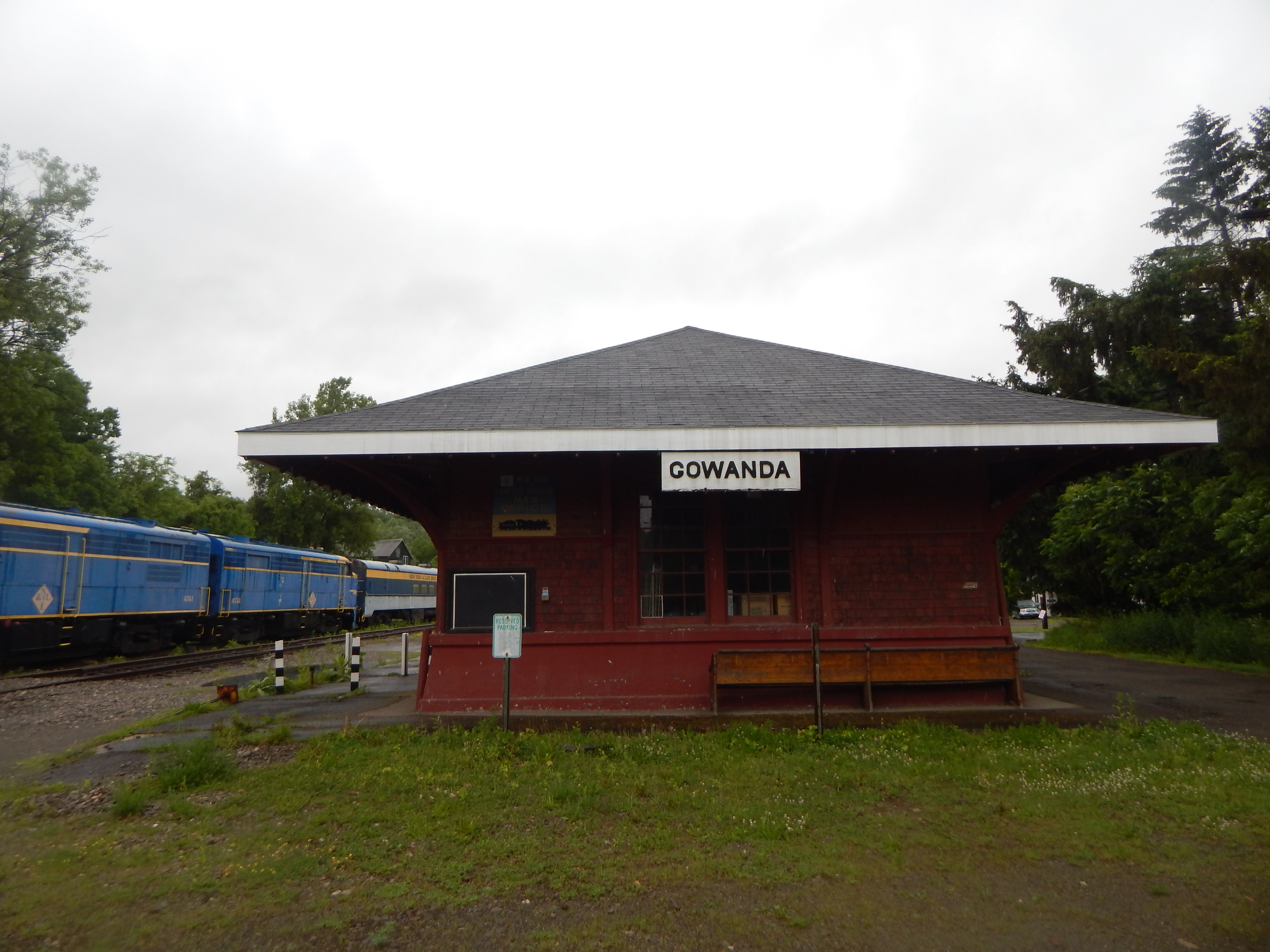
- Gowanda station in May 2015

Overview
- Owner: Erie Railroad
- Locale: Western New York
- Termini: Jamestown station, Jamestown; Buffalo station, Buffalo
- Stations: 21

Service
- Type: Commuter rail line
- System: Buffalo and South Western Railroad Division of the Erie Railroad
- Operator(s): Buffalo and South Western Railway (1872–1895) Erie Railroad (1895–1960) Erie Lackawanna Railroad (1960–1976)

Technical
- Track gauge: 4 ft 8 1/2 in (1,435 mm)

The Buffalo and South Western Railroad was a predecessor of the Erie Railroad that ran 89 miles between Jamestown, New York, and Buffalo, New York.

== History ==
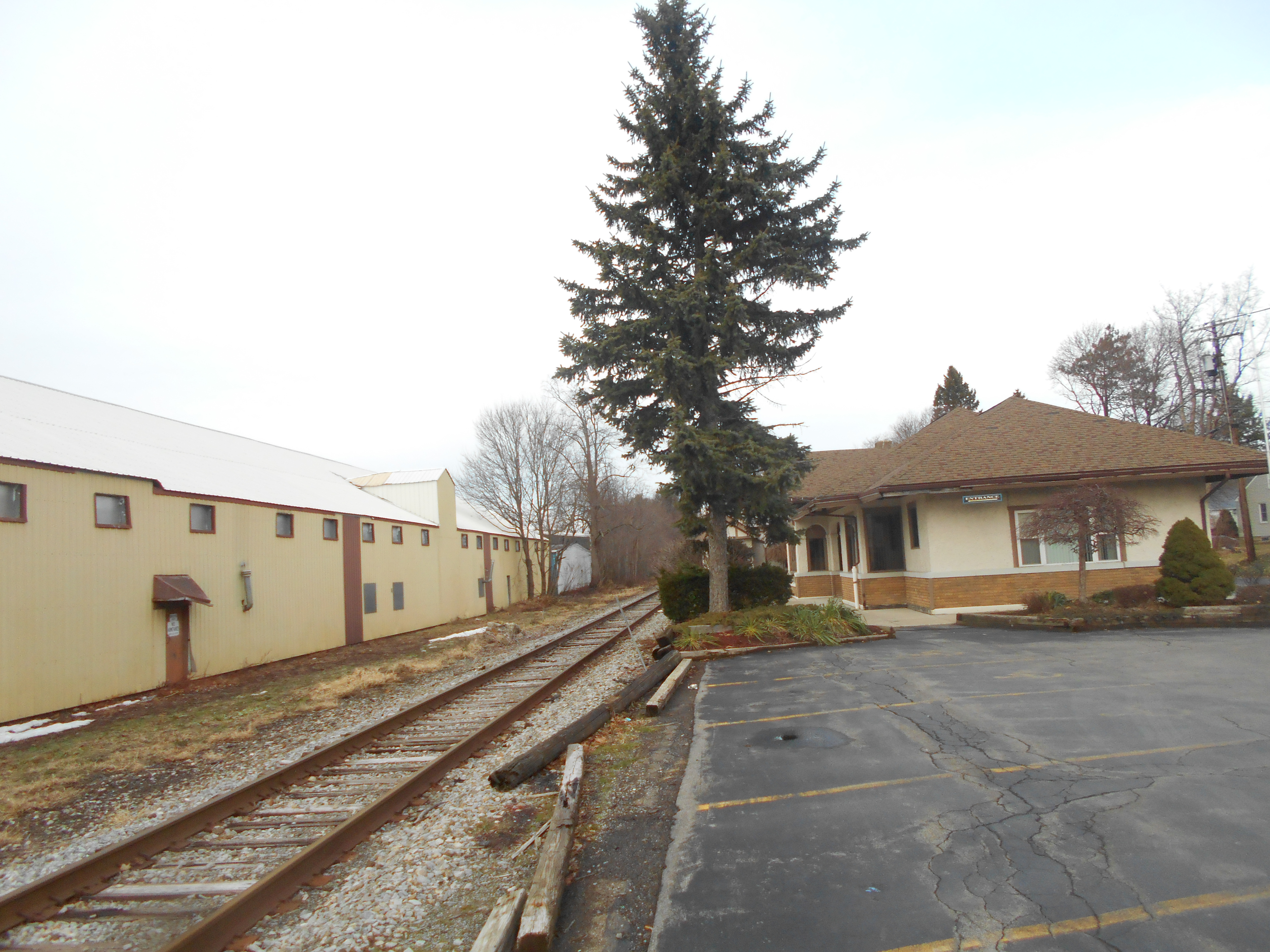
The second station constructed at Hamburg in 1922, as seen in December 2014

The Buffalo and Jamestown Railroad was incorporated on March 23, 1872, to build a line between Buffalo and Jamestown. The road was opened in sections and was completed in July 1875. The line was never financially successful and Buffalo and Jamestown Railroad was sold on December 12, 1877, to the Buffalo and South Western Railroad.

The Buffalo and South Western Railroad was short-lived and was leased by the New York, Lake Erie and Western Railroad on August 1, 1880, for an annual rental of 35 percent of the gross earnings for the line. On November 19, 1895, the Erie officially merged the Buffalo and South Western by virtue of owning 100 percent of the B&SW stock.

== Current status ==
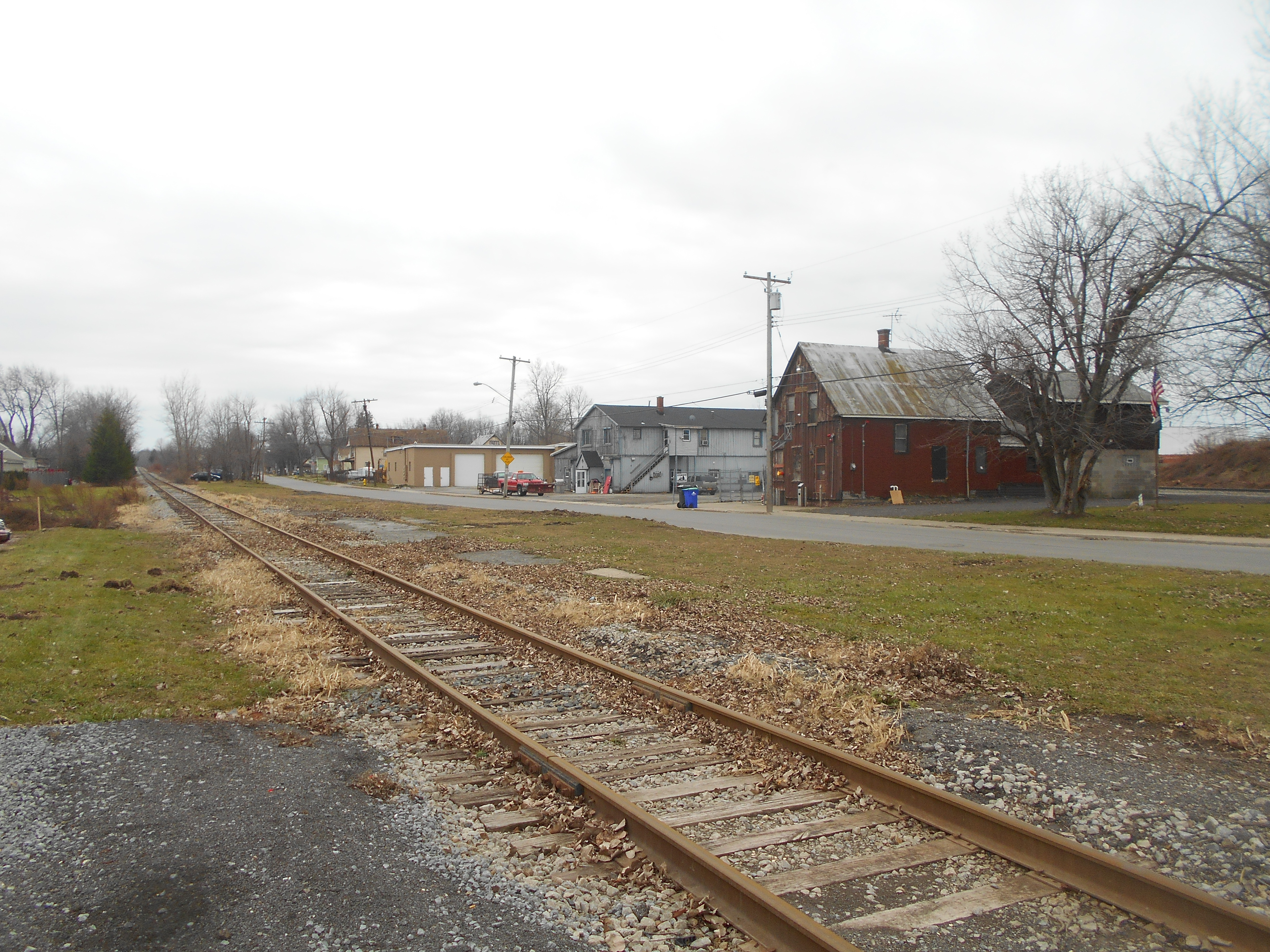
The Blasdell station site in December 2014

Much of the line operated by the Buffalo and South Western Railroad still sees use. The Buffalo Southern Railroad operates the portion from Buffalo to the Erie County line at Gowanda and the New York and Lake Erie Railroad operates the line south from Gowanda to South Dayton, including an excursion train that runs in the summer.

Additionally, since 2016, under the auspices of the Buffalo, Cattaraugus & Jamestown Scenic Railway, a not for profit organization, Buffalo Southern hosted and provided motive power for seasonal excursions from Hamburg to Water Valley New York.
