= The Brick Theater =

Venue in Brooklyn, New York

Coordinates: 40.71414°N 73.94978°W

The Brick Theater is a venue in Williamsburg, Brooklyn that presents dance, performance art, drag, comedy, film, music, experimental theatre, and more. Gothamist has hailed the space as “one of the city’s most reliable sources for smart, funny, and surprising performance.”

== History ==
The Brick was founded by Michael Gardner and Robert Honeywell in 2002. The theater is in a brick-walled former garage/auto-body shop and former yoga center. Since its inception, the Brick has presented off-beat revivals, messy shows, and festivals on themes such as the convergence of video games in theatre, stage combat, and comic book artists.

In 2019 it was announced that Theresa Buchheister would step into the role of Artistic Director, joined by Ryan William Downey and Travis Just as Associate Artistic Directors. In December 2019, the space was renovated to improve its technical capabilities and accessibility. Buchheister, Downey, and Just assumed leadership in January 2020 alongside curators Harrison Rivers, Nicolás Noreña, Justin Linville, Yuki Kawahisa, Teresa Braun, and Alyse Lamb. While remaining "Williamsburg’s primary incubator of innovative theater and performing arts" the team's renewed vision is producing multi-week theatrical runs along with one-off performances events.

In March 2020 amidst the COVID-19 pandemic, the Brick created Out of An Abundance of Caution, a livestreamed avant-garde microfestival online via Twitch. In April 2020 the Brick began releasing archival recordings of shows produced at the space on YouTube.

In 2023 the Brick won an Obie Award Theatre Grant, with the judges praising its artistic experimentation and financial accessibility.

In 2024 Buchheister stepped down as the Artistic Director. As of September 2025, Peter Mills Weiss was the theatre's producing artistic director.

== Selected Production History ==
=== Shows ===
Absence of Magic
Action Jesus (The Baby Jesus One-Act Jubilee 2009)
Adventures of Caveman Robot
Afternoon Playland (The Antidepressant Festival)
. . . And the Fear Cracked Open (The Antidepressant Festival)
And the Spirit of Christmas Passed (The Baby Jesus One-Act Jubilee 2009)
Assyrian Monkey Fantasy
The Baby Jesus Conversation (The Baby Jesus One-Act Jubilee 2009)
Babylon, Babylon
A Bender Family Christmas (The Baby Jesus One-Act Jubilee 2009)
Bethlehem or Bust (Fight Fest 2010)
Bizarre Science Fantasy
Blood on the Cat’s Neck (The CollisionWorks 2009)
Bouffon Glass Menajoree
Brick-a-Brac
The Buccaneer (Fight Fest 2009)
Buffoon Anonymous: 12 Steps To Inanity (Clown Festival 2012)
Butterfly, Butterfly, Kill Kill Kill! (Fight Fest 2009)
Cabaret Terrarium (The Antidepressant Festival)
A Christmas Carol (The Baby Jesus One-Act Jubilee 2009)
Craven Monkey and the Mountain of Fury (Fight Fest 2009)
Dandilion and the Bicycle-Powered Cloud Plane (The Too Soon Festival)
Dar and Matey’s Christmas SpectaculARGH! (Fight Fest 2010)
Dear Dubya (The Moral Values Festival)
Death Is a Scream (The Too Soon Festival)
Deck the Hallmans (Fight Fest 2009)
Evolution (Fight Fest 2009)
Exit, Pursued by Bears (The Antidepressant Festival)
Fallout Follies
Freak Out Under the Apple Tree: (Some of) The Best of Tom X. Chao (The Moral Values Festival)
George Bataille’s Bathrobe (The CollisionWorks 2009)
Glee Club (The Antidepressant Festival)
Grand Theft Ovid (Game Play 2010)
The Granduncle Quadrilogy: Tales from the Land of Ice
Greed: A Musical Love $tory
Habitat
Hack! An I.T. Spaghetti Western (The Too Soon Festival)
Happily after Tonight (The Too Soon Festival)
Hollow Hallow (The Baby Jesus One-Act Jubilee 2009)
In a Strange Room (based on Faulkner's As I Lay Dying)
Infectious Opportunity (The Antidepressant Festival)

Jeannine’s Abortion—A Play in One Trimester (The Too Soon Festival)
Jenna Is Nuts
The Kung-Fu Importance of Being Earnest (The $ellout Festival)
Kool-Aid Man in Second Life (Game Play 2010)
Last Life (Fight Fest 2009)
Marshmallow World (The Baby Jesus One-Act Jubilee 2009)
Memoirs of My Nervous Illness
Modal Kombat (Game Play 2010)
Mother Mary Come to Me (The Baby Jesus One-Act Jubilee 2009)
My Year of Porn (The Moral Values Festival)
The Nigerian Spam Scam Scam (The $ellout Festival)
The Ninja Cherry Orchard (Fight Fest 2009)
Notes from Underground
Power Burn 3 (Fight Fest 2009)
The Pragmatists
Rapier Wit! (Fight Fest 2010)
The Revellers (The Baby Jesus One-Act Jubilee 2009)
RIP JD—A Celebration of Death (The Too Soon Festival)
Samuel and Alasdair: a Personal History of the Robot War
Schaden, Freude and You: a 3 Clown Seminar (The Antidepressant Festival)
Sincerely, Raven Harte (The Baby Jesus One-Act Jubilee 2009)
Suspicious Package (The Film Festival: a Theater Festival; Game Play 2009)
Suspicious Package: Rx (The Antidepressant Festival)
The Tale of the Good Whistleblower of Chaillot’s Caucasian Mother and Her Other Children of a Lesser Marriage Chalk Circle (The Antidepressant Festival)
That Old Soft Shoe (The Too Soon Festival)
That’s Not How Mahler Died
Theater of the Arcade (Game Play 2010)
Third Person (The Moral Values Festival)
Trayf (The Baby Jesus One-Act Jubilee 2009)
Tupperware Orgy
Uncomplicated (The Baby Jesus One-Act Jubilee 2009)
The Vigil or The Guided Cradle
The Wedding of Berit Johnson and Ian W. Hill (The Too Soon Festival)
Who Is Wilford Brimley?
WILM 690: Pirate Radio (The Antidepressant Festival)
World Gone Wrong (The Moral Values Festival; The CollisionWorks 2007)
Your Lithopedian (The Antidepressant Festival)

=== Festivals ===
The Too Soon Festival (2010)
The Antidepressant Festival (June 5–July 4, 2009)
The Film Festival: a Theater Festival (2008)
The Pretentious Festival (2007)
The $ellout Festival (2006)
The Moral Values Festival (2005)
The Hell Festival (2004)
Game Play
Tiny Theater Fest
The Baby Jesus One-Act Jubilee
Fight Fest
The CollisionWorks

The Havel Festival (2006)

The New York Clown Theater Festival

== Awards ==
Samuel and Alasdair: a Personal History of the Robot War, 2010 IT Award, Outstanding Production of a Play
Samuel and Alasdair: a Personal History of the Robot War, Marc Bovino, Joe Curnutte, Michael Dalto, Stephanie Wright Thompson, 2010 IT Award, Outstanding Ensemble
Samuel and Alasdair: a Personal History of the Robot War, Stowe Nelson, 2010 IT Award, Outstanding Sound Design
The Vigil or The Guided Cradle, Crystal Skillman, 2010 IT Award, Outstanding Original Full-Length Script
2009 Caffe Cino Fellowship Award
Suspicious Package, ITBA Award, Best Off-Off Broadway Unique Theatrical Experience
Bouffon Glass Menajoree, 2007 IT Award, Outstanding Production of a Play
The Present Perfect, 2007 IT Award, Outstanding Lighting Design
2006 Village Voice Best of NY—Best Reason for Theater Haters to Buy Season Tickets
2005 nytheatre.com’s People of the Year
2004 nytheatre.com’s People of the Year
In a Strange Room, Time Out New York Top Ten Plays of 2004

=== Nominations ===
Craven Monkey and the Mountain of Fury, 2010 IT Award nominee, Outstanding Performance Art Production
Craven Monkey and the Mountain of Fury, Julianne Kroboth, 2010 IT Award nominee, Outstanding Costume Design
Infectious Opportunity, James Comtois, 2010 IT Award nominee, Outstanding Original Full-Length Script
Samuel and Alasdair: a Personal History of the Robot War, Marc Bovino, 2010 IT Award nominee, Outstanding Actor in a Lead Role
Samuel and Alasdair: a Personal History of the Robot War, Joe Curnutte, 2010 IT Award nominee, Outstanding Actor in a Lead Role
Samuel and Alasdair: a Personal History of the Robot War, Stephanie Wright Thompson, 2010 IT Award nominee, Outstanding Actress in a Lead Role
Samuel and Alasdair: a Personal History of the Robot War, Lila Neugebauer, 2010 IT Award nominee, Outstanding Director
The Granduncle Quadrilogy: Tales from the Land of Ice, Ivanna Cullinan, 2009 IT Award nominee, Outstanding Actress in a Featured Role
The Granduncle Quadrilogy: Tales from the Land of Ice, Ian W Hill, 2009 IT Award nominee, Outstanding Lighting Design
Suspicious Package, 2009 IT Award nominee, Outstanding Production of a Play
Bouffon Glass Menajoree, Lynn Berg, Audrey Crabtree, Aimee German, 2007 IT Award nominee, Outstanding Ensemble
Bouffon Glass Menajoree, Lynn Berg, Audrey Crabtree, Eric Davis, Aimee German, 2007 IT Award nominee, Outstanding Original Short Script
Bouffon Glass Menajoree, Eric Davis, 2007 IT Award nominee, Outstanding Director
Greed: a Musical Love $tory , 2007 IT Award nominee, Outstanding Production of a Musical
The Kung-Fu Importance of Being Earnest, Qui Nguyen, 2007 IT Award nominee, Outstanding Choreography/Movement
The Present Perfect, 2007 IT Award, Outstanding Set Design
Strom Thurmond Is Not a Racist/Cleansed, 2007 IT Award nominee, Outstanding Production of a Play
Strom Thurmond Is Not a Racist/Cleansed, Thomas Bradshaw, 2007 IT Award nominee, Outstanding Original Full Length Script
Strom Thurmond Is Not a Racist/Cleansed, Barrett Doss, 2007 IT Award nominee, Outstanding Actress in a Leading Role
Strom Thurmond Is Not a Racist/Cleansed, Suzan Perry, 2007 IT Award nominee, Outstanding Actress in a Featured Role
