= Best Musical =

Best Musical may refer to:

- Critics' Circle Theatre Award, Best Musical
- Evening Standard Award, Best Musical
- Laurence Olivier Award for Best New Musical
- Laurence Olivier Award for Best Musical Revival
- Manchester Evening News Theatre Awards, Best Musical
- New York Innovative Theatre Awards, Outstanding Production of a Musical
- Outer Critics Circle Award, Best Musical
- Tony Award for Best Musical
- Tony Award for Best Revival of a Musical
