= Buffalo and Jamestown Railroad =

- 1875 map

Overview
- Headquarters: Baltimore, MD
- Locale: Buffalo, New York to Jamestown, New York
- Dates of operation: 1872–1877

Technical
- Track gauge: 4 ft 8 1/2 in (1,435 mm) standard gauge

The Buffalo and Jamestown Railroad was a railroad that ran between the towns of Jamestown, NY and Buffalo, NY. It was a predecessor of the Erie Railroad.

== History ==
The Buffalo and Jamestown Railroad company was incorporated on March 23, 1872. A mortgage was issued October 1, 1873, and given by company to The Farmers Loan and Trust Company as trustee to secure an issue of $2,500,000 of 6 per cent. bonds, payable October 1, 1893.

The line was built with the aid of one million dollars from the city of Buffalo and another million dollars donated by towns along the line. Work commenced rapidly and the road was completed from Buffalo to Gowanda by October 20, 1874. At Dayton the track passed under the tracks of the Erie main line from Salamanca to Dunkirk and continued south to Jamestown. The road was opened in sections and was completed in July 1875.

The line was never financially successful, and the mortgage was foreclosed by an action brought in the Supreme Court for Erie County, wherein The Farmers Loan and Trust Company as trustee was plaintiff and The Buffalo and Jamestown Railroad Company et al. were defendants. A judgment of foreclosure and sale was entered on February 3, 1877 and George S. Wardwell was appointed as the referee to sell the company. On September 11, 1877, all the property and franchises of The Buffalo and Jamestown Railroad Company were sold for $1,000,000 to Abraham Altman, Jewett M. Richmond, William H. H. Newman, John F. Moulton and Wilson X. Bissell, as a committee of bondholders. The referee's report of sale was dated November 26, 1877, and the order confirming referee's report of sale made at a special term of the Supreme Court held at Buffalo on November 26, 1877.

A deed dated December 12, 1877, from Jewett M. Richmond and wife, William H.. H. Newman and wife, John P. Moulton and wife, and Wilson S. Bissell, unmarried, as a committee of bondholders, etc., conveyed the railroad, property and franchises acquired as aforesaid through the above-mentioned foreclosure and deed to the Buffalo and Southwestern Railroad Company.

The Buffalo and Southwestern Railroad was leased by the New York, Lake Erie and Western (Erie Railroad) on August 1, 1880, for an annual rental of 35 percent of the gross earnings for the line. On November 19, 1895, the Erie officially merged the line by virtue of owning 100 percent of the B&SW stock.

== Current status ==
Much of the line originally built by the Buffalo and Jamestown Railroad still sees use. The Buffalo Southern Railroad operates the portion from Buffalo to the Erie County line at Gowanda, and the New York and Lake Erie Railroad operates the line south from Gowanda to South Dayton, including an excursion train that runs in the summer.
