= National Comedy Center =

American museum

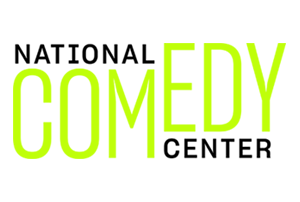

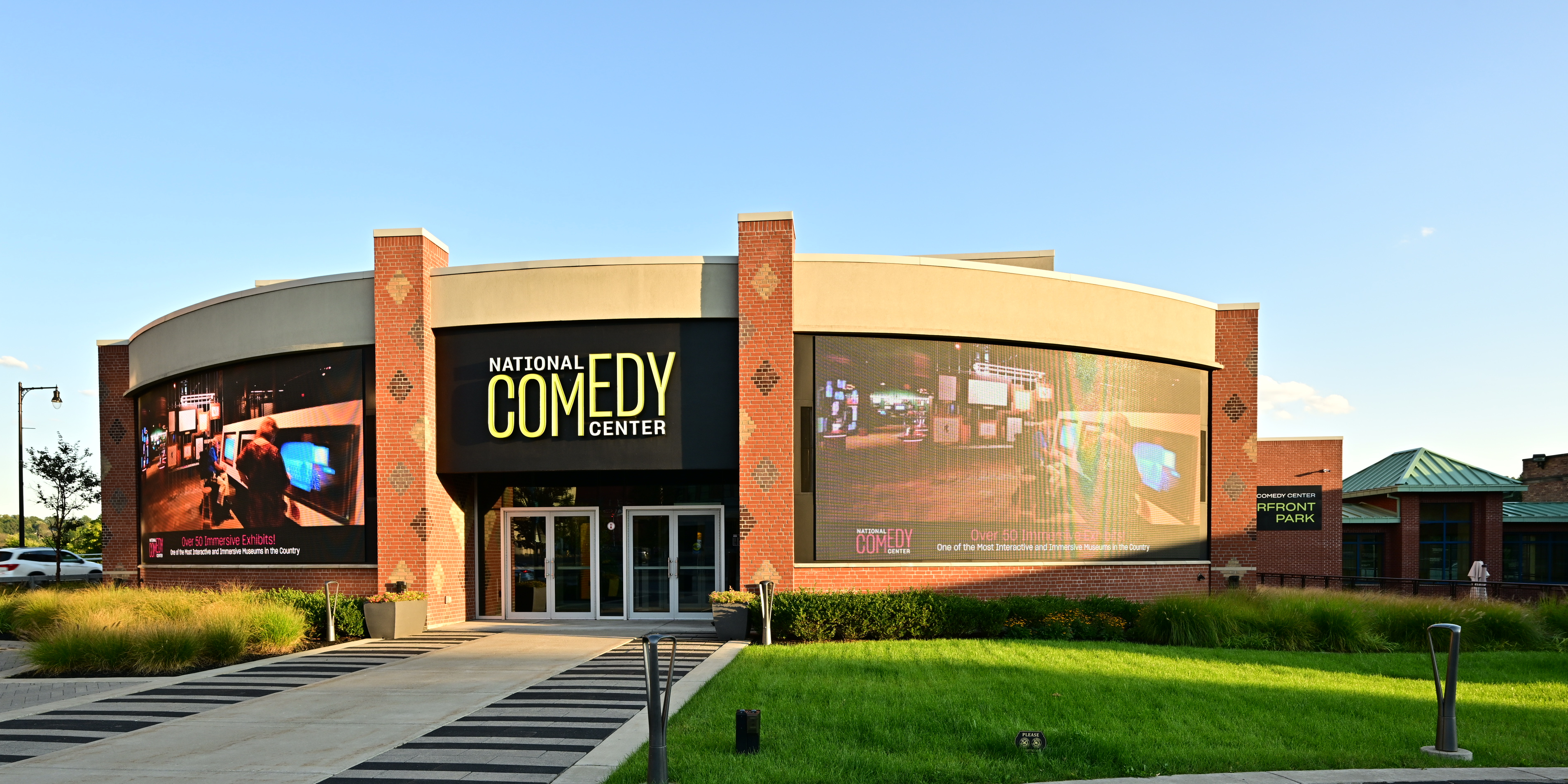
- National Comedy Center

- Location of National Comedy Center New York State National Comedy Center (the United States)
- Established: August 1, 2018; 8 years ago
- Location: 201 West 2nd Street (West 2nd Street at Washington Street); Jamestown, New York 14701
- Coordinates: 42°5′41″N 79°14′38″W
- Director: Journey Gunderson
- Public transit access: Via (Jamestown station); Chautauqua Area Regional Transit System; Coach USA; Amtrak Thruway
- Website: comedycenter.org

The National Comedy Center is an American museum dedicated to comedy. Located in Lucille Ball’s hometown of Jamestown, New York, the museum opened in August 2018 and reported 66,000 visitors in its first year of operation. The museum had been operating since 1996 as the Lucille Ball-Desi Arnaz Museum, which is now located a few blocks away.

== History ==
The National Comedy Center documents the history of comedy and the artists, producers, writers, cartoonists, and other notable figures who have influenced its development in the United States and opened in August 2018. The following month, in September 2018, Condé Nast Traveler called the National Comedy Center "one of the best museums in the country."

In January 2019, the National Comedy Center was named by USA Today 10Best as the "Best New Attraction" in the country, ranking #2 out of 20 new attractions and being chosen as the #1 museum and #1 ticketed attraction.

It was designated as the US' official cultural institution and museum dedicated to comedy by the United States Congress on February 26, 2019.

In June 2019, the National Comedy Center was named one of the "100 Reasons to Love America" by People magazine.

In August 2019, the National Comedy Center was named one of the "World's Greatest Places"—one of "100 new and newly noteworthy destinations to experience right now" and one of only nine attractions to visit in the United States—by TIME magazine.

The museum includes more than 50 immersive experiences through comedy history, from early vaudeville acts to viral memes. Visitors have a ‘humor profile’ created on entry and stored on an RFID wristband called a ‘Laugh Band’. Content is then presented according to individual tastes, from broad slapstick to edgy satire. Along with educational games and competitions, guests can also create their own comedic content with interactive activities like performing stand-up, recreating iconic funny faces, and creating their own comic strip.

== Board members and archival material ==
Within the Comedy Center's museum galleries, more than 50 interactive exhibits and immersive experiences present the history of the art form from its origins to the present day, using archival documents, artifacts, and media as their core.

The entertainment industry supports the National Comedy Center with donations of materials related to famous people in comedy. Individual donors include Dan Aykroyd, the Shelley Berman estate, the Smothers Brothers, The Lenny Bruce Memorial Foundation, Carol Burnett, Kelly Carlin and the George Carlin estate, the Andy Kaufman Memorial Trust, the Harpo Marx Family, the Harold Ramis Family, Carl Reiner, the Garry Shandling Estate, Jerry Seinfeld, the Betty White estate, and Lily Tomlin. Entertainment companies have provided items from their archives, including Desilu Too, NBC Universal, Paramount Pictures, and Warner Brothers. Through a partnership with the Elkhorn Valley Museum in Norfolk, Nebraska, the center shares management of the Johnny Carson archive.

Additionally, the center's advisory board includes members of the comedy industry, including Lewis Black, Paula Poundstone, W. Kamau Bell, George Schlatter, Laraine Newman, Jim Gaffigan, Pete Docter, Kelly Carlin, George Shapiro (succeeded by Amy Poehler after Shapiro's death), Rain Pryor, Paul Feig, Robert Klein, David Steinberg, Mark Russell, Alan Zweibel, Paul Provenza, and Jeff Abraham.

Its educational programming on the art form has featured Tiffany Haddish, George Lopez, Margaret Cho, Norman Lear, Rain Pryor (daughter of Richard Pryor), Jay Leno, Kenan Thompson, Gabriel Iglesias, Jimmy Fallon, Lin-Manuel Miranda and "Weird Al" Yankovic. In April 2020, the center launched the "National Comedy Center Anywhere" online platform featuring content directly from its interactive comedy exhibits, including exclusive interviews and online programs with comedians, directors, writers, producers, and creators in the comedic craft.

In March 2021, the museum's archives were renamed "The National Comedy Center’s Carl Reiner Department of Archives and Preservation." It was simultaneously announced that this would be the official repository of Carl Reiner's archives. Reiner was an early supporter of the center.

== Lucille Ball Comedy Festival ==
Established in 1991 by the National Comedy Center, the annual Lucille Ball Comedy Festival is held every August to honor Ball's August 6 birthday. Hosted in her hometown of Jamestown, New York, the festival embodies her wish for the city to be a hub of celebration of the comedic arts and showcase new talent from across the country.

=== Previous Festival Performers: ===
==== August 6-9, 2026 ====
- Seth Meyers
- Jerry Seinfled
- Bert Kreischer
- Carol Leifer
- Gina Brillon
- Matt Koff
- Ian Lara
- Jenny Zigrino
- Drew Dunn
- Katie Hannigan
- Tina Friml

==== August 7-10, 2025 ====
- Jon Stewart
- Bill Murray & His Blood Brothers
- Streeter Seidell
- James Austin Johnson
- Seth Herzog
- Adam Mamawala
- Erica Rhodes
- Shane Torres
- Erin Jackson

==== August 1-4, 2024 ====
- Nate Bargatze
- Nicole Byers
- Jeff Ross
- Ophira Eisenberg
- Dave Hill
- Matt Koff
- DJ Demers
- Moody McCarthy
- Ali Macofsky
- Erin Jackson
- Nina Daniels

==== August 2-6, 2023 ====
- Gabriel "Fluffy" Iglesias
- Taylor Tomlinson
- Pat Hazell
- Rachel Feinstein
- Tony Deyo

==== August 3-7, 2022 ====
- Rob Schneider
- Kevin Nealon
- David Spade
- Margaret Cho
- Jeff Foxworthy

==== August 4-8, 2021 ====
- Rob Schneider
- Kevin Nealon
- David Spade
- Jeff Foxworthy

==== August 5-9, 2020 - Virtual Festival ====
- Harrison Greenbaum
- Kate Flannery
- Frank DeCaro
- Charles McBee
- Anna Drezen
- Aidy Bryant
- Ophira Eisenberg
- Lolly Adefope
- Flame Monroe
- Judy Gold
- Howie Mandel
- Bill Engvall
- Alan Zweibel
- Gilmore Gottfried
- Mark Russell
- Penn Jillette
- Sam Jay
- Debra Messing
- Dulce Sloan
- Lin-Manuel Miranda
- Weird Al Yankovic
- Paula Poundstone
- Tiffany Haddish
- Jimmy Fallon
- Kenan Thompson
- Roy Wood Jr.

== See also ==
- Lucille Ball
- Lucie Arnaz
- Media related to National Comedy Center at Wikimedia Commons
