= Siobhan O'Loughlin =

American actress, playwright, and activist

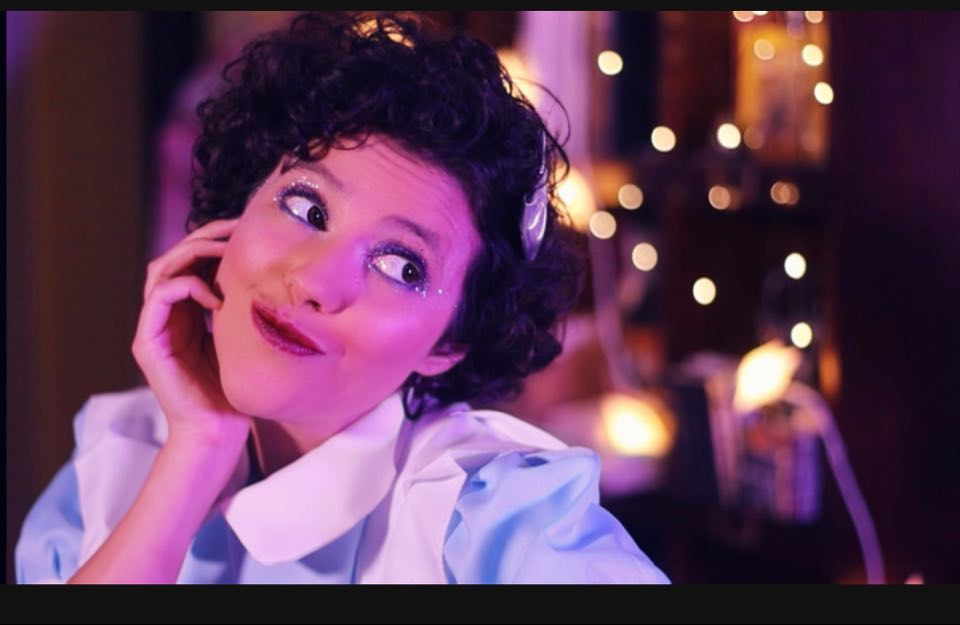
- Siobhan O'Loughlin, 2020
- Occupations: Actress, playwright, activist
- Notable work: Broken Bone Bathtub, Please Don't Touch the Artist

Siobhan O'Loughlin is an American actress, playwright, and activist. Her work has earned numerous accolades, including the 2016 New York Innovative Theatre Award for Outstanding Solo Performance for her piece, Broken Bone Bathtub.

== Biography ==
O'Loughlin is a native of Salisbury, Maryland. She holds a degree in acting and theater arts from Towson University.

O'Loughlin has produced three solo shows: The Rope in Your Hands, Natural Novice, and Broken Bone Bathtub. Broken Bone Bathtub, an immersive theater experience, is performed by O'Loughlin from inside a bathtub in a home. Typical audiences range from 6-8 people. O'Loughlin has performed Broken Bone Bathtub over 600 times.

In 2020, O'Loughlin is producing a series of interactive theatrical events titled Please Don't Touch the Artist. The performances are conducted via Zoom.

She is also a canvasser for the Democratic Socialists of America
