= Jamestown station =

Historic train station in Jamestown, New York

Jamestown
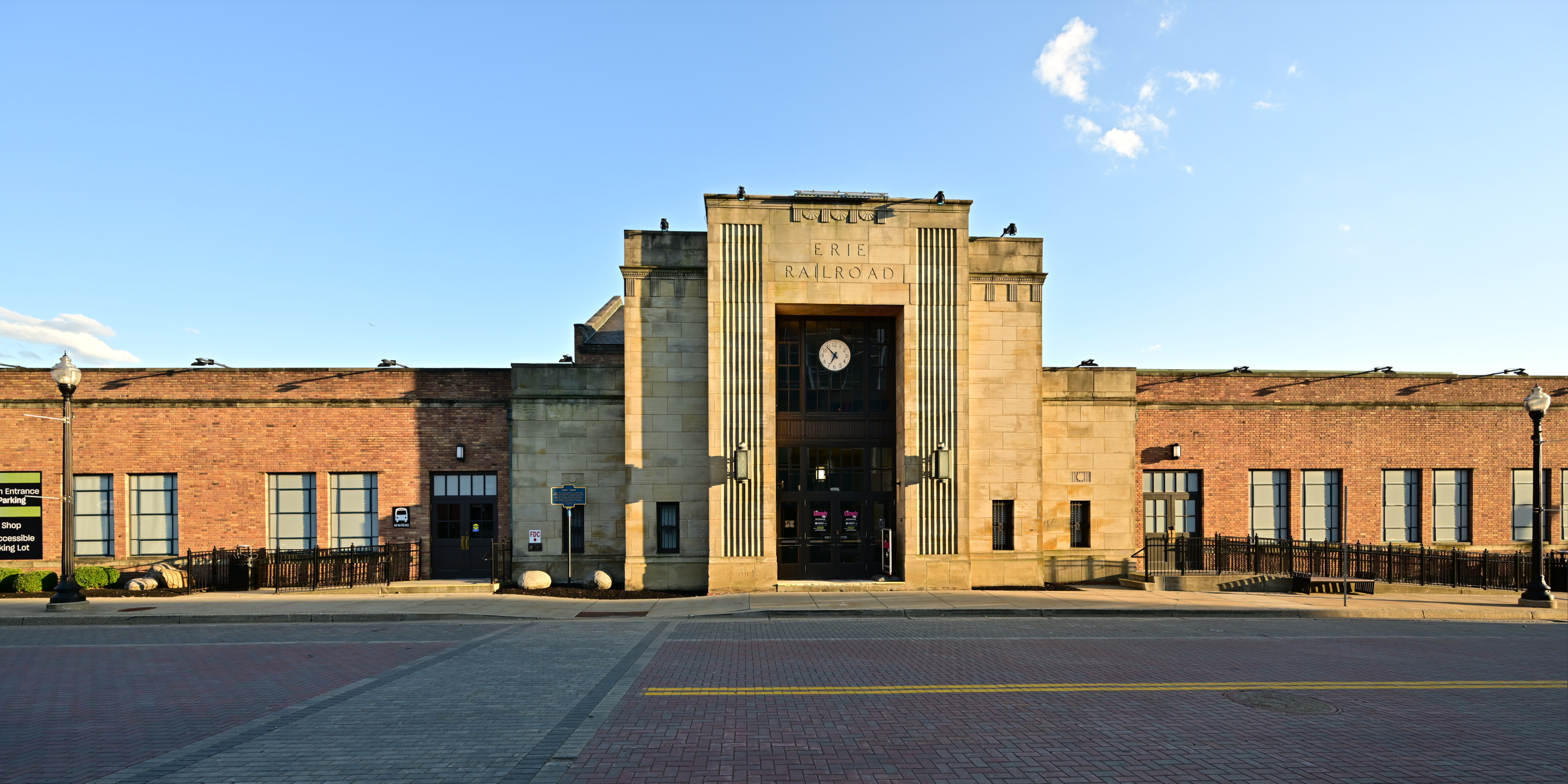

General information
- Location: 211-217 West Second Street; Jamestown, New York 14701
- Owner: Erie Railroad (1895–1960) Erie Lackawanna Railroad (1960–1976) Conrail (1976–1992) City of Jamestown (1992–2017) National Comedy Center (2017–present)
- Lines: Main Line (Meadville Division); Buffalo and Southwestern Railroad
- Platforms: 1 island platform (former)
- Tracks: 3 (former)
- Connections: Chautauqua Area Regional Transit System; Coach USA; Amtrak Thruway

Construction
- Platform levels: 2
- Cycle facilities: Yes
- Accessible: Yes

Other information
- Station code: 5017

History
- Opened: August 25, 1860; 166 years ago
- Closed: January 6, 1970; 56 years ago
- Rebuilt: 1897; 129 years ago 1924; 102 years ago June 7, 1932; 94 years ago 2011; 15 years ago

Former services
Preceding station	Erie Railroad	Following station
Lakewood toward Chicago	Main Line	Falconer toward Jersey City
Terminus	Buffalo and South Western Railroad	Falconer toward Buffalo
- Erie Railroad Station
- U.S. National Register of Historic Places
- Location within New York Location within the United States
- Location: 211-217 W. Second St., Jamestown, New York
- Coordinates: 42°5′40″N 79°14′41″W
- Area: 1.4 acres (0.6 ha)
- Built: 1931
- Architectural style: Art Deco
- NRHP reference No.: 03000045
- Added to NRHP: May 2, 2003
Location

Jamestown station is a historic train station located at Jamestown in Chautauqua County, New York. Although no longer an active railroad station due to a lack of passenger service in the area, after a restoration done in 2011 the building currently serves as a bus transportation center and community space for Jamestown. The first train arrived at Jamestown on August 25, 1860 as part of the Atlantic and Great Western Railroad.

The station is part of the National Comedy Center.

== History ==
The station was constructed in 1931–32 for the Erie Railroad as a replacement for a much older station. It passed on to successor Erie Lackawanna Railroad in 1960 and continued to serve as a station for the railroad's long distance trains operating between Hoboken and Chicago. The last trains to use the station were the Atlantic Express/Pacific Express (discontinued, 1965) and the Lake Cities (discontinued, January 1970). On April 1, 1976 Erie Lackawanna became part of the Conrail system, which was taken over in turn by CSX Transportation and the Norfolk Southern Railway on June 1, 1999. Local railroad offices continued to occupy the building.

The station passed to private ownership and was slowly stripped of salvageable materials. In 1992, the Jamestown Urban Renewal Agency took ownership of the station with $120,000 in funding from the federal Community Development Block Grant program. It was listed on the National Register of Historic Places in 2003 as the Erie Railroad Station. Senator Charles Schumer announced grant monies to help restore the station as a commercial and transit hub on August 23, 2010. Upon completion of the $12 million (2012 USD) restoration, the restored station was opened to the public on October 26, 2012. At this point the station was re-named the Jamestown Gateway Station.

In 2017, the National Comedy Center took over ownership of the station from the city and its associated agencies. The Jamestown station and surrounding area is now part of the National Comedy Center, which was opened in 2018.

== Services ==
The Chautauqua Area Regional Transit System (CARTS) and Coach USA use the facility.

The station provides no Amtrak or commuter rail service. However, it is a stop for Amtrak Thruway buses at a Chautauqua Area Regional Transportation Service bus shelter at 217 West 2nd Street, connecting to Buffalo's Exchange Street Station.

== Gallery ==
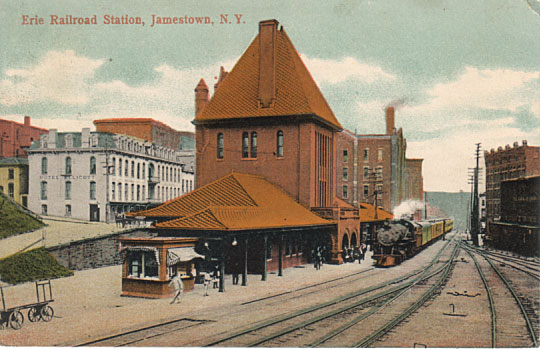
1909 postcard of older Erie Station Building.

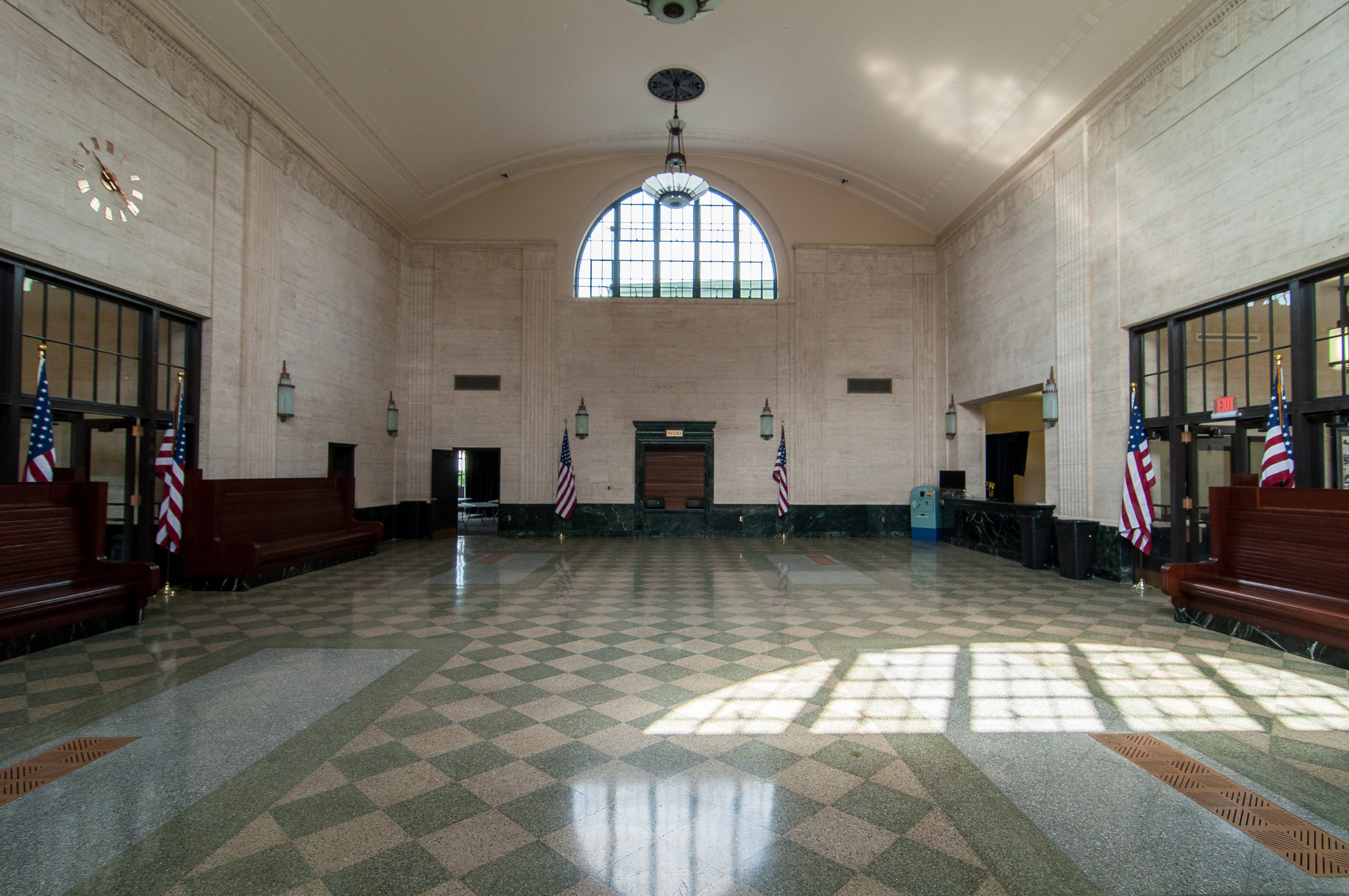
Jamestown Gateway Station interior

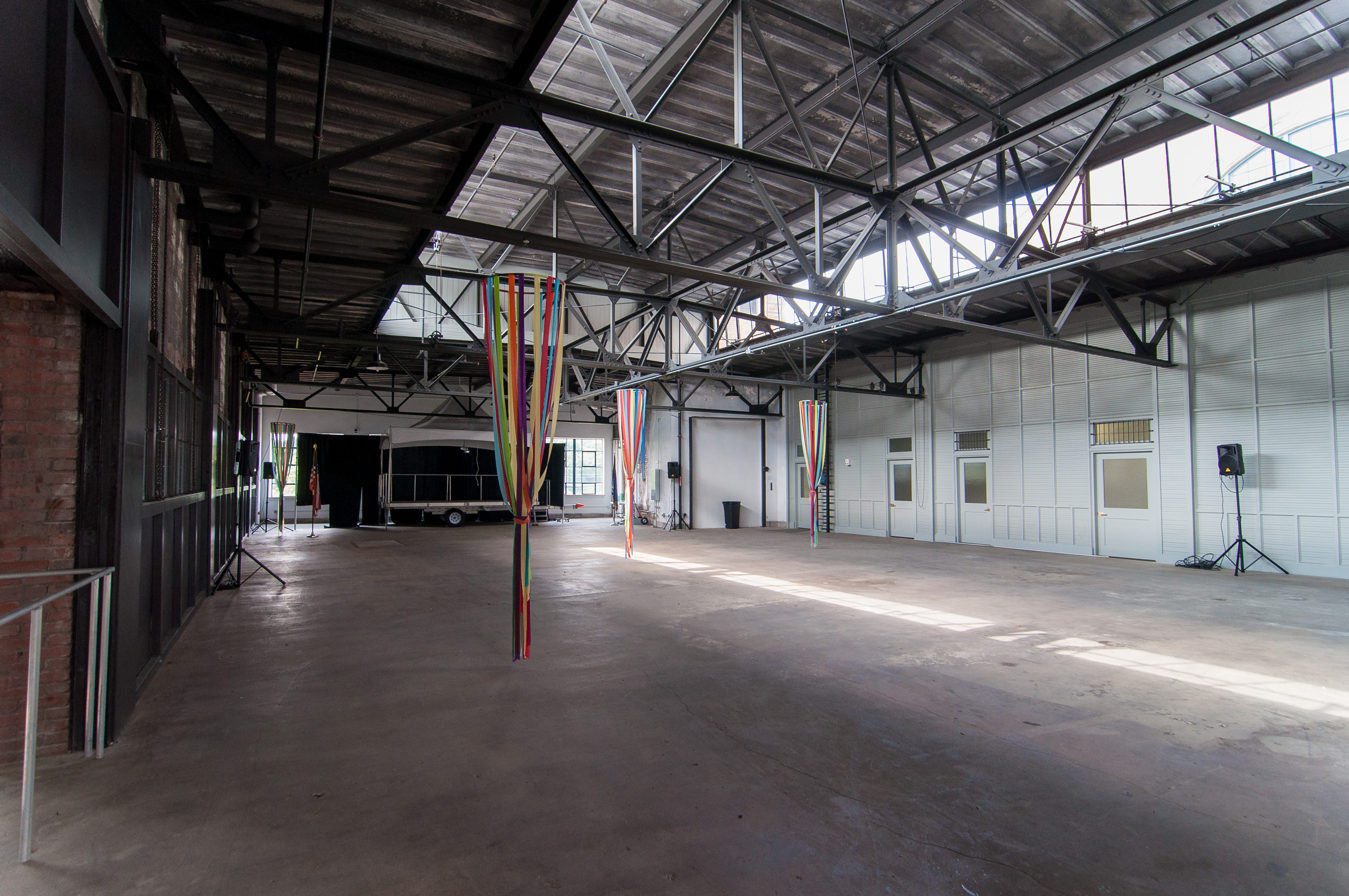
Jamestown Gateway Station interior

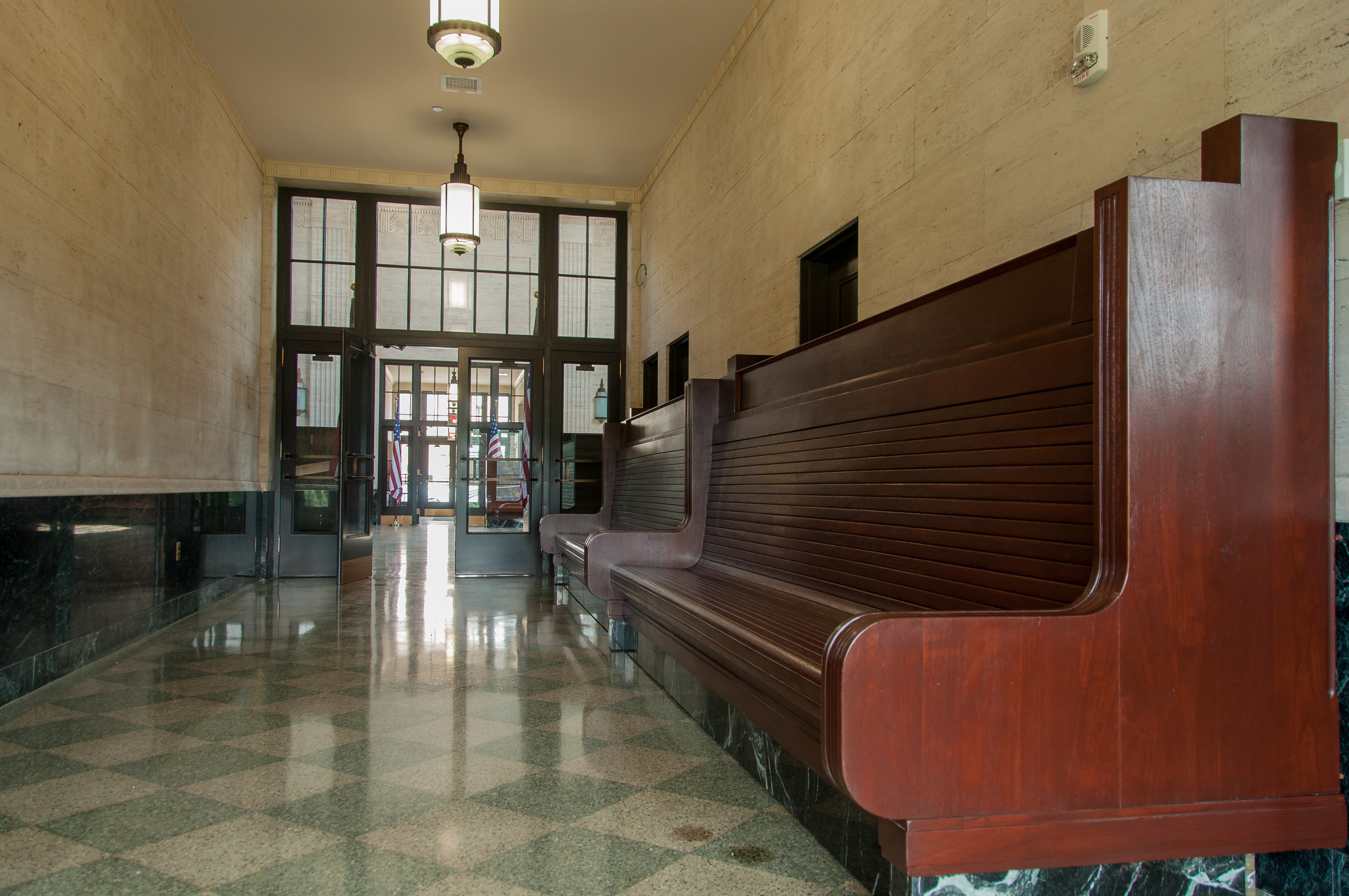
Jamestown Gateway Station hallway

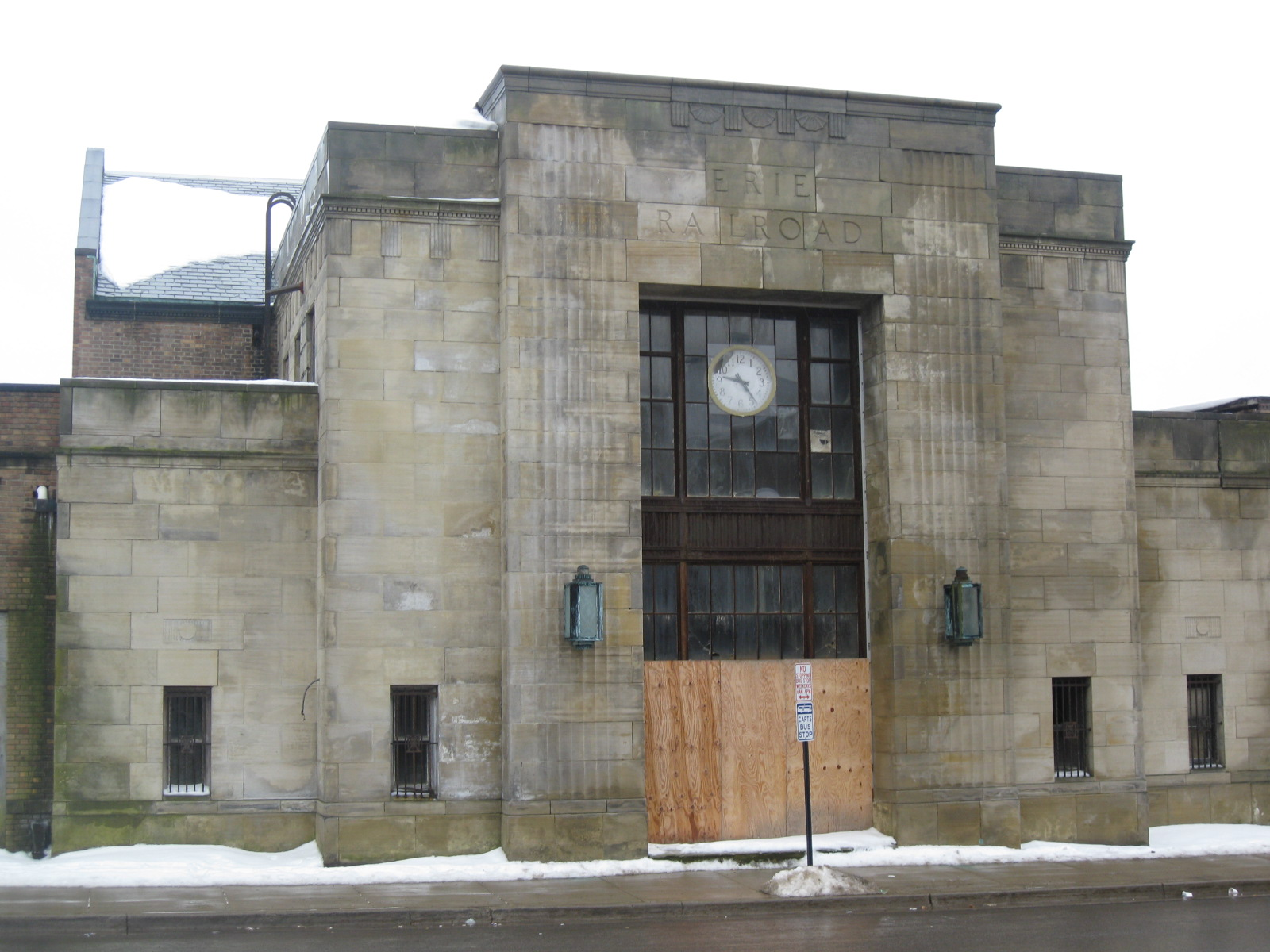
Jamestown Gateway station front prior to the 2011 renovation

== See also ==
- List of Erie Railroad structures documented by the Historic American Engineering Record
- National Comedy Center
