= Who Is the Black Dahlia? =

1975 television film

- Genre: Drama
- Written by: Robert W. Lenski
- Directed by: Joseph Pevney
- Starring: Efrem Zimbalist, Jr. Lucie Arnaz; Ronny Cox
- Country of origin: United States
- Original language: English

Production
- Executive producer: Douglas S. Cramer
- Producer: Henry Colman
- Editor: Carroll Sax
- Running time: 100 minutes

Original release
- Network: NBC
- Release: March 1, 1975

Who Is the Black Dahlia? is a 1975 television film about the true crime unsolved murder of 22-year-old Elizabeth Short. Leonard Maltin's Movie Guide gives the film an Above Average rating, and states "… this atmospheric crime drama is intriguingly written and well cast down to the cameos."

== Plot ==
In a voice-over Sergeant Harry Hansen says he will never forget how the case began. On January 15, 1947 Hansen and Sergeant Finis Brown were assigned to investigate a mutilated corpse found in a Los Angeles vacant lot. A young unidentified woman had been bisected, and all of her blood had been drained from her body.

In a February 1943 flashback 18-year-old Elizabeth Short of Maine tells her grandmother that her father had sent money for her to go to California and stay with him. She hopes to become an actress. When Elizabeth arrives at her father’s home he states he just sent her money, but wasn’t planning on her living with him. He grudgingly agrees she can stay for awhile if she does the housework. In a voice-over Elizabeth narrates the beginning of a letter to her grandmother, saying her father is happy to see her, and all is going well.

Sergeants Hansen and Brown learn the murdered woman had been cut in two with surgical precision, and that someone with medical or mortuary experience committed the crime. The murder case is on the front page of all the newspapers, and reporters are seeking gruesome details.

In additional flashbacks Elizabeth’s father is angry with her for staying out late each night, and not doing any household chores. He gives her money to return for Maine, but after he leaves for work she packs her suitcase and sets out to find a new California home. She obtains a job at an army base PX, and tells her supervisor that she is the widow of a major who was killed in the war. Elizabeth writes her grandmother that she is making progress in her film career. After a couple of months she quits her PX job.

Hansen sends the murder victim’s fingerprints to Washington D.C. They don’t match any of the local fingerprint records, but he hopes the woman had a police record somewhere.

In a 1944 flashback 19-year-old Elizabeth is arrested for underage drinking, and in 1947 her fingerprint records allow the murder victim to be identified. A newspaper reporter learns that Elizabeth Short was known at a diner as the Black Dahlia, due to her black hair and habit of always wearing black clothes. The name is used in news stories, numerous people confess to killing the Black Dahlia, but none of the self-proclaimed killers can tell three facts about the case that are being kept from the public.

The police recover Elizabeth’s suitcase from a bus station locker. Hansen and Brown open it and find a cupie doll with a handwritten message of "Love, Doc". There were black clothes, letters from Elizabeth’s grandmother, and a stolen address book with the name of wealthy movie theater promoter Miles Harmonder on the cover.

With more clues to go on Hansen learned Elizabeth stayed at various homes for short periods of time. She was always secretive about her life, went out with men every night, and she never paid any rent. At one of the homes she said she wore black because she was a war widow.

A newspaper editor received a phone call from a man claiming to be the murderer of the Black Dahlia. The caller gave information that the police had not released, and he promised to send the editor a package. When the package arrived it contained Elizabeth’s Social Security card, along with other forms of ID. The man never contacted anyone again.

Hansen tracked down Dr. Coppin, a hospital intern. The doctor stated he had been in a bar drinking with Elizabeth on two occasions. He bought her the doll when she asked for it, but she was the one who had written Love, Doc on it. After the second time he had been drinking with Elizabeth he helped her out by driving her to the Mayfair Hotel, for she said she would be meeting someone there. Witnesses remembered Elizabeth going into the hotel, then leaving. She was seen placing her suitcase in a bus station locker, and then she returned to the hotel and sat in the lobby for several hours. Finally she went outside, and a taxi driver who’d been parked in front of the hotel saw her walking down the sidewalk.

In a voice-over Hansen said they could find no one who saw Elizabeth during the last six days of her life. He and Sergeant Brown spent twenty years following up possible leads on the still-unsolved murder case, before they both retired. He believes the man who sent the package to the newspaper editor was Elizabeth’s killer. Dr. Coppin provided an alibi for the night of the murder. Miles Harmonder, whose address book was stolen by Elizabeth, committed suicide. Hansen wonders if anyone listening to him knows something about the murder that he doesn’t know.

== Cast ==
Per a Daily World article the cast is:

- Efrem Zimbalist, Jr. as Sergeant Harry Hansen
- Lucie Arnaz as Elizabeth Short
- Ronny Cox as Sergeant Finis Brown
- MacDonald Carey as Captain Jack Donahoe
- Linden Chiles as Dr. Coppin
- Donna Mills as Susan Winters
- Mercedes McCambridge as Grandmother
- Tom Bosley as Bevo Means, Reporter

== Production ==
The Douglas S. Cramer Company had retired detective Harry Hansen working as a technical advisor. The film plot line was based on hundreds of published accounts, plus first-person interviews conducted by private investigators hired by Cramer. The script had to be reworked because many people with connections to the unsolved case refused to sign releases, so their names could not be used. Some of the actual locations and incidents could not be referenced because needed releases were not signed.

Efrem Zimbalist Jr.’s stand-in, Paul McWilliams, claimed that he had dated Elizabeth Short for four months. McWilliams asked the retired detective, who was on the set, if he remembered him. "You and this other cop got me out of bed at 4 a.m. in 1947 and drove me around for four hours talking about Betty."

When Lucie Arnaz went to the producer’s office to discuss the part of Elizabeth Short there were many photos of the murder victim, and people were amazed at Arnaz’s resemblance to Short. Someone said the actress was the Black Dahlia. Arnaz insisted on playing the deceased Elizabeth Short lying in the field and in the morgue scene.
