= New York Clown Theater Festival =

Clown Theatre Festival held in New York

New York Clown Theatre Festival
- Genre: Clown festival
- Locations: Brooklyn, New York, U.S.
- Founded: 2005
- Founders: Audrey Crabtree, Eric Davis, Devon Ludow and The Brick Theater
- Website: bricktheater.com

The New York Clown Theatre Festival is an annual festival of the art of clown, held at The Brick Theater in Brooklyn, New York. Kicked off every year by a parade beginning in Union Square and heading on the L train to Williamsburg, the festival opens with a huge indoor pie fight. Festival performers come from across the U.S. and the globe, including Australia, Brazil, Canada, Catalonia, Denmark, France, Germany, Ireland, Italy, Mexico, New Zealand, Spain, Switzerland and Britain.

Notable clowns, including Aitor Basauri, Christopher Bayes, Bob Berky, Audrey Crabtree, Dody DiSanto, Ronlin Foreman, Philippe (Gaulier), Bill Irwin, Eric Davis, Sue Morrison Joan Schirle, and David Shiner have appeared and also given workshops and lectures at the festival.
