= Plucked (2026 film) =

2026 American dark comedy period film

- Theatrical release poster
- Directed by: Usher Morgan, Katie Vincent
- Produced by: Usher Morgan, Katie Vincent, Paul Luba
- Starring: Katie Vincent; Jared Canfield; J. Anthony Crane; Catherine Curtin; Susan Gallagher; Tony D. Head; Bryant Carroll; Fred Sullivan; Jacob A. Ware
- Cinematography: Guiseppe Masi
- Production company: Dark Passage Films
- Release date: November 13, 2026
- Running time: 110 minutes
- Country: United States
- Language: English
- Budget: $300,000

Plucked is a 2026 American dark comedy period film written, produced, and directed by Usher Morgan and Katie Vincent. The film stars Vincent in the lead role, alongside Jared Canfield, J. Anthony Crane, Catherine Curtin, Susan Gallagher, Bryant Carroll, and Tony D. Head.

The film was independently produced by Dark Passage Films and was released theatrically in the United States on November 13, 2026.

== Premise ==
In Gilded Age New York, a rebellious woman (Vincent) is trying to divorce her emotionally unstable husband (Canfield). Consequently, a civilized evening violently spirals into pandemonium.

== Cast ==
- Katie Vincent
- Jared Canfield
- J. Anthony Crane
- Catherine Curtin
- Susan Gallagher
- Bryant Carroll
- Tony D. Head
- Fred Sullivan
- Jacob A. Ware

== Early reviews ==
The film opened to mixed-to-positive positive reviews, critics praised the film's dialogue, performances, and blend of period drama and dark comedy but criticized the film's use of modern language and rock music.

Carl Burgess of Screen Critix awarded the film 4.5 out of 5 stars, calling it "an impressive return from Morgan and Vincent" that showed "considerable growth in scale and visual confidence." Alton Williams, a critic with Battle Royale With Cheese described it as an "entertaining and increasingly unpredictable film that finds plenty of drama within the walls of a single home." Williams also praised Vincent's performance in the film.

The New York Amsterdam News's "Curtain Raiser" critic Lapacazo Sandoval noted the film's $300K micro budget, and wrote that Plucked is "“a deliciously vicious dinner party in a world you can’t resist entering.”

Jason Knight of UK Film Review awarded the film 4 out of 5 stars, praising its period setting, cinematography, and performances, particularly those of Vincent and Canfield; noting that the first half of the film was somewhat slow-paced, he felt the remainder of the film made up for it.

Film critic Brittany Frederick called Plucked a "chaotic romp of a film," noting that the film's "appeal comes from everyone, including the audience, not taking it too seriously." Although she did criticize the supporting cast as somewhat stereotypical, adding that "one weak point is that supporting characters all slot into basic stereotypes, and most of them aren’t on screen long enough to make a decent impression," Frederick nonetheless praised the film's overall playful and comedic tone.

Film critic duo Kaplan vs. Kaplan gave the film a negative review, disliking the film's use of modern language, noting that "In fact, the actors are hampered by the fact that they must employ modern-day language even though the story takes place in 1886, i.e., the Gilded Age. This was one of Jeanne’s biggest complaints about the screenplay."
