= Pitch trailer =

Movie trailer to show the concept of a film

In the filmmaking industry, a pitch trailer, also known as a concept trailer or proof of concept trailer, is a movie trailer produced independently by the filmmaker for the sole purpose of illustrating the concept, style and theme of a feature film. Pitch trailers can be used by film directors, producers or executive producers during the film's planning, crowdfunding or fundraising phase. They are often self-financed and are structured and edited to appear like an ordinary feature film trailer. Pitch trailers are most commonly presented to financiers as a part of the film's pitch. Sometimes, these trailers are used for casting purposes and marketing purposes as well.

== Examples ==
Well known examples of feature films produced following a successful concept trailer pitch were The Lord of the Rings film series, Looper, The Hunger Games, Machete, Sky Captain and the World of Tomorrow, the Super Troopers films, Iron Sky, Pickings, Miles Ahead, Hardcore Henry, Lazer Team, The Peanut Butter Falcon and others. Pitch trailers became popular among indie filmmakers who use websites like Indiegogo and Kickstarter to fund their movies.

== See also ==
- Golden Trailer Awards
- Movie trailer
- Pitch
- Re-cut trailer
- Snipe (theatrical)
- Stinger (post-credits scene)
- Teaser trailer
- Trailer music
