= Harrison Greenbaum =

American comedian

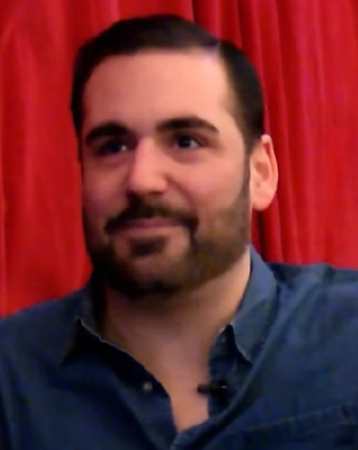
- Greenbaum in 2019
- Born: September 14, 1986 (age 39); Manhattan, New York, U.S.
- Occupations: Comedian, host
- Website: www.harrisongreenbaum.com

Harrison Greenbaum (born September 14, 1986) is an American stand-up comedian and comedy writer.

== Early life ==
Greenbaum was born in Manhattan, New York, and grew up in Woodmere, New York, on Long Island. He graduated as valedictorian of his class at Lawrence High School.

Harrison's mother, Pamela Greenbaum, stated in 2010 that Harrison's paternal grandmother "told the serious stories about the Holocaust camps" while his paternal grandfather Henry Greenbaum, also a Holocaust survivor, “told the humorous stories." Harrison's father, Steven Greenbaum, is "a New York City director of real estate."

Greenbaum attended Harvard, where he graduated summa cum laude in 2008 and won the 2006 Visiting Committee Prize for Undergraduate Book Collecting for his collection of magic books. He also won the Gordon W. Allport Prize for his psychology thesis, "'Did you hear the one about the...?': The effect of racial humor on prejudice."

While at Harvard, Greenbaum co-founded the Harvard College Stand-Up Comic Society.

== Career ==
Greenbaum has performed at many of the leading comedy clubs throughout the world including Carolines on Broadway, Gotham Comedy Club, Comix NY, Comic Strip Live, and the Laugh Factory, and is a regular at the Comedy Cellar.

He was the first-ever comedian or comedy magician to headline a Cirque du Soleil show, Cirque du Soleil's Mad Apple, at the New York-New York Hotel and Casino in Las Vegas.

Harrison Greenbaum's solo comedy and magic show, titled "Harrison Greenbaum: What Just Happened?", premiered at the Upright Citizens Brigade Theatre in New York City, marking the venue's first magic show. The show then had an Off-Broadway run and embarked on an international tour, with performances at the Kennedy Center in Washington, D.C., the Magic Castle in Hollywood, California, and the Comedy Cellar in New York City, where it was also the first magic show to be performed at the venue. Additionally, the show was the first magic show featured at the National Comedy Center in Jamestown, New York, a museum and cultural institution dedicated to comedy.

=== Television ===
In 2013, Greenbaum was the warm-up comedian for the first season of Katie, Katie Couric's talk show on ABC, and a producer on Would You Fall for That? on ABC.

He was also featured in the first season of Gotham Comedy Live on AXS.TV and in the special Gotham Comedy Live episode, "Best of Season 4: New York, the City that Never Bleeps".

In 2014, Greenbaum was a special guest on Brain Games on National Geographic Channel.

In 2015, Greenbaum was a semi-finalist on Last Comic Standing on NBC.

In 2017, Greenbaum auditioned for America's Got Talent on NBC, performing stand-up comedy.

In 2018, Greenbaum performed on Conan on TBS.

In 2022, Greenbaum was featured on Sherri.

=== Hosting ===
Greenbaum was an official co-host of the 2010 Times Square New Year's Eve World Wide Webcast and was the host of the New York Innovative Theatre Awards, held at Cooper Union's Great Hall in 2011 and at Kaye Playhouse in 2012.

Greenbaum is a writer for MAD Magazine.

=== Awards and recognition ===
Greenbaum is the winner of the 2010 Andy Kaufman Award, given in recognition of creativity and originality in comedy. He is also the winner of the 2011 Magners Comic Stand-Off and a 2011 Shorty Award for excellence in short-form social media (i.e. Twitter). Greenbaum was named one of 2010's "Comics to Watch" by Comedy Central and one of the "Best of the Breakout Artists" by Carolines on Broadway and Punchline Magazine. As part of Carolines' Breakout Artists Series, Greenbaum headlined the club, becoming the first performer to sell out a "Breakout" show. Greenbaum became a member of the New York Friars' Club in 2009, making him one of the youngest people ever inducted into the legendary club. On August 5, 2017, Greenbaum was awarded the Clarke Crandall Award for Comedy at the 80th Abbott's Magic Get-Together in Colon, Michigan, the Magic Capital of the World.
