= Nancy LaMott =

American singer

Nancy LaMott (December 30, 1951 – December 13, 1995) was an American singer from Midland, Michigan, popular on the New York City cabaret circuit in the 1980s and breaking out into radio and the national and international scene in the 1990s. Along with Karen Mason, she was the first singer to do a continuous long run at Don't Tell Mama in New York City. She went on to play all of the smaller clubs in New York, and began to record in the early 1990s.

== Career ==
In 1991, songwriter and producer David Friedman formed a record label for LaMott, MIDDER Music Records, Inc, and, with Christopher Marlowe at the piano, recorded her first CD. It was an instant success in the cabaret world, and each year Friedman would use the profits from the previous CD to record another one. The release and popularity of LaMott's CDs led her to become a regular at New York's more prestigious clubs, such as Tavern on the Green and The Oak Room at the Algonquin, where she broke house records for attendance. In 1993, Jonathan Schwartz discovered LaMott and she became a staple on his internationally broadcast radio shows. Friedman wrote many of his songs for LaMott, including "We Can Be Kind", "We Live on Borrowed Time", and "Just in Time For Christmas" (lyrics by David Zippel). Friedman's songs "Listen To My Heart", "I'll Be Here With You" and "Your Love" also became signature tunes for LaMott.

In 1994, arranger Peter Matz tapped LaMott to sing in a concert honoring Alan and Marilyn Bergman in Los Angeles, and her success at this concert catapulted her to the national scene. Matz signed on to orchestrate LaMott's fifth album, Listen To My Heart, and this CD brought her large national attention. LaMott performed twice at the White House for President Bill Clinton and Hillary Clinton. and also sang at Carnegie Hall, the annual Cabaret Conventions at Town Hall and always sang the closing song at John Znidarsic's In Celebration of Life Concert. She also participated in numerous benefits to raise money for causes related to AIDS and human rights, and performed major concerts in her home town of Midland Michigan, and her "second home town" San Francisco.

In 2008, her posthumously-released album Ask Me Again, featuring songs she recorded between 1988 and 1995, reached #12 on Billboard magazine's Top Jazz Albums chart. She sang with a "sweet-voiced cabaret-style singing" described as "gentle" with a "1940s style" which won a tight circle of admirers and almost a "cult following". When she was beginning to achieve commercial and critical success, her life was tragically cut short by uterine cancer in 1995.

== Early life ==
As a young girl, LaMott would sing along with Barbra Streisand records, according to her father, a supervisor with the Dow Chemical Company in Midland, Michigan. At 15, she performed with her father's dance band, and also worked at a local Sears store. At 17, she was diagnosed with Crohn's disease, an incurable medical affliction that involves difficult intestinal problems and chronic pain and arthritis.

LaMott moved to San Francisco. Her early years in San Francisco became a pattern of singing gigs and hospital visits, running up medical debts and taking any jobs to pay the rent. She suffered through with the help of painkillers, stomach remedies and steroids, and sometimes had to perform sitting to work against spasms caused by the disease. She struggled for twenty-five years to achieve recognition and success in the music business. She moved to New York City in 1979.

She was described as having an "all-American prettiness" which gave her a "vulnerable, doll-like demeanor" as she developed her singing style. She was named the "best cabaret singer" by New York Magazine.

== Death ==
In 1993, she underwent an ileostomy operation to remove a large portion of the third part of her small intestine; this operation dramatically improved her health. In the same year, she won the MAC Award for Outstanding Female Vocalist.

In March 1995, LaMott was diagnosed with uterine cancer, yet she postponed a hysterectomy in order to record Listen To My Heart, an album that took only a remarkable two days to complete. The operation revealed that the cancer had metastasized.

Her last public performance was on December 4, 1995, at one of WQEW's live performances. On that same day, she made her last TV appearance on CNBC's The Charles Grodin Show, singing Moon River. According to conductor and composer David Friedman, who wrote many of the songs which she performed, LaMott's life featured two threads: her illness and her talent, and the "two things peaked at exactly the same time".

On December 13, 1995, Father Steven Harris blessed the union of Nancy to Peter Zapp, a little more than an hour before she died. She died at 11:40 PM EST, at St. Luke's–Roosevelt Hospital Center in Manhattan.

== Posthumous awards ==
- Lifetime Achievement Award – Manhattan Association of Cabarets & Clubs (MAC), April 1996
- Entertainer of the Year 1996 – the Cabaret Hotline Critic's Choice

== Discography ==
Composer David Friedman produced her eight albums and a feature DVD under MIDDER Music label.

- Beautiful Baby (1991; MMCD001)
- Come Rain or Come Shine (1992; MMCD002)
- My Foolish Heart (1993; MMCD003)
- Just in Time for Christmas (1994; MMCD004)
- Listen to My Heart (1995; MMCD005)
- What's Good about Goodbye? (1996; MMCD006)
- Live at Tavern on the Green (2005; MMCD007)
- Ask Me Again (2008; MMCD008, 2-CD set)
- I'll Be Here With You (2008; DVD)
- The Don't Tell Mama Shows (2010; MMDVD102)
