= Prego (film) =

- Poster
- Directed by: Usher Morgan
- Written by: Usher Morgan
- Story by: Usher Morgan
- Produced by: Usher Morgan
- Starring: Katie Vincent; Taso Mikroulis
- Cinematography: Louis Obioha
- Edited by: Usher Morgan
- Production company: Digital Magic Entertainment
- Distributed by: Digital Magic Entertainment
- Release dates: May 1, 2015 (New York City); December 21, 2015 (United States)
- Running time: 13 minutes
- Country: United States
- Language: English

Prego is a 2015 American independent short comedy film directed, written and produced by Usher Morgan, with the help of Seinfeld writer Andy Cowan - the film was released to the internet on December 21, 2015 after a 9 months festival run. The film stars Katie Vincent, Taso Mikroulis, Rachel Jayne, J.W. Harvey and Marah Vanbeekom.

== Plot ==
Prego offers a humorous take on unplanned pregnancies, it follows the story of Emily (played by Katie Vincent), a young woman confronting a one-night stand (played by Taso Mikroulis) with the revelation that she's pregnant. Things go from bad to worse as she comes to grips with the realization that the man may not be a suited father figure to her unborn child.

== Translations ==
Prego was translated and dubbed into numerous languages, including Italian, Czech, Russian, Greek and Mandarin.

== Critical reception and reviews ==
The film gained national recognition and received positive reviews. It won the Best Comedy Short Award at the 2015 Manhattan Film Festival, Best Comedy Short Award at the 2015 Chain NYC Film Festival, 2 awards from the 2015 Indie Fest Film Festival, and the Best Comedy award at the 2015 Trinity International Film Festival. In total the film received 6 wins and 12 nominations. Carl Burgess with ScreenCritix gave the film a positive review: "Prego may only be a two-hander in one location (except for a brief flashback), but the short never becomes boring. This is in thanks to the sharp, funny script and the two great performances from Katie Vincent and Taso Mikroulis. Vincent plays the role of Katie superbly, and Mikroulis’ portrays Mark great as bumbling idiot." Nicholas La Salla with Forest city short film review gave the short a 3.4/5 and mentioned: "Though the storyline has a "been there, done that" feel (most notably in the big budget Knocked Up), the aforementioned fork in the plot toward the end made up for a lot. The jokes are by and large funny and the characters play off each other in humorous ways."

== Awards and nominations ==
Awards and nominations for Prego
Year	Association	Country	Award category	Status
2015	Manhattan Film Festival	United States	Best Comedy Short Film	Won
2015	Chain NYC Film Festival	United States	Best Comedy Short	Won
2015	Black Cat Picture Show	United States	Best Short Film	Nominated
2015	New Filmmaker NYC Film Festival	United States	Best Comedy Short	Nominated
2015	Trinity International Film Festival	United States	Best Comedy Short	Won
2015	Trinity International Film Festival	United States	Best Actress in Comedy Film - Katie Vincent	Won
2015	Big Apple Film Festival	United States	Best Comedy Short	Nominated
2015	IndieFest USA	United States	Award of Merit	Won
2015	IndieFest USA	United States	Best Actress in Comedy Short - Katie Vincent	Won
2015	The Dam Short Film Festival	United States	Best Comedy Short	Nominated
2015	North Hollywood Cinefest	United States	Best Comedy Short	Nominated
2016	Revolution Me Film Festival	United States	Best Comedy	Nominated
2016	Boardwalk Film Festival	United States	Official Selection	Nominated
