= Lucille Ball Desi Arnaz Museum & Center for Comedy =

Luci-Desi Museum in her hometown

Lucille Ball Desi Arnaz Museum
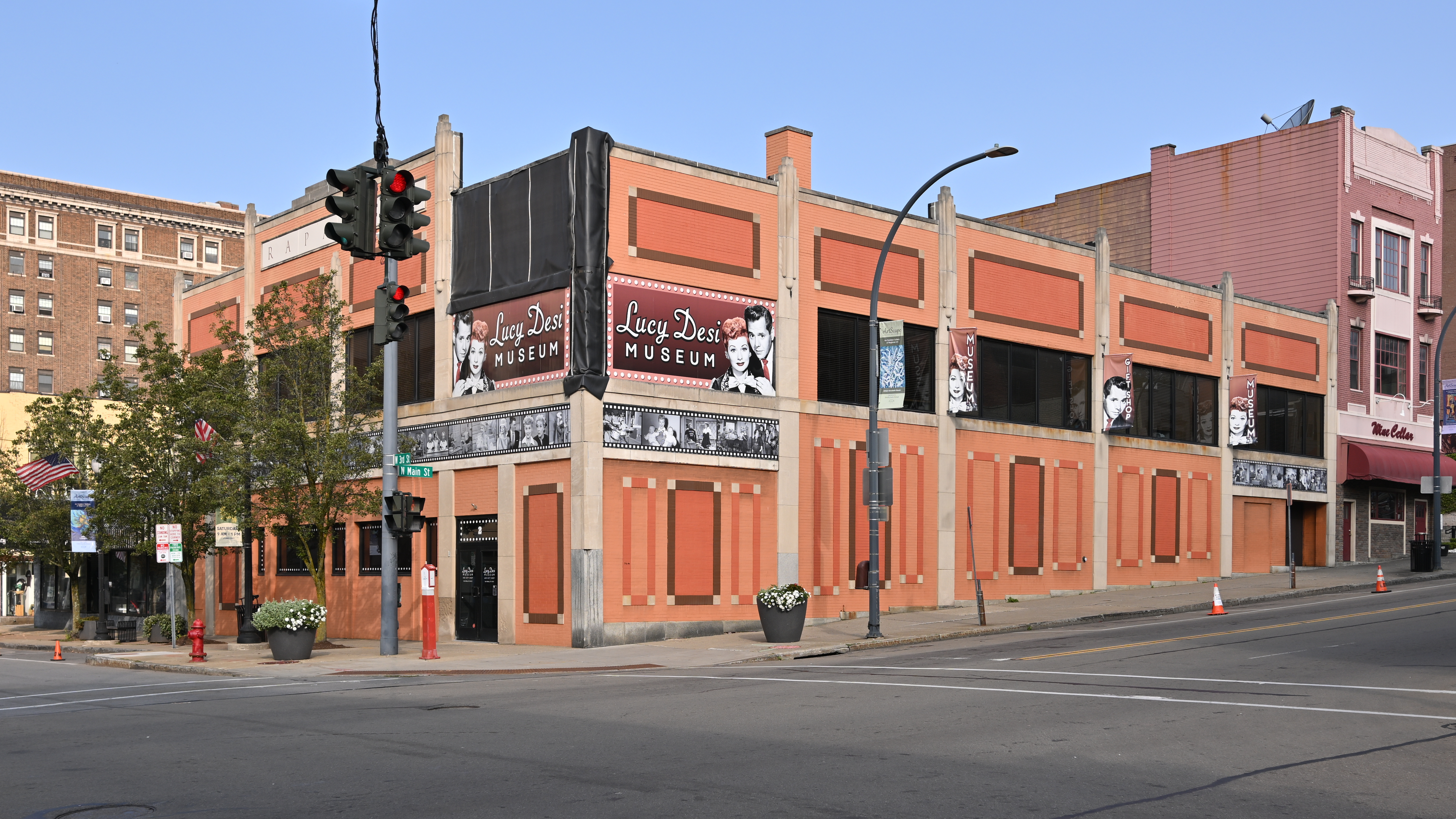

- Location of National Comedy Center New York State Lucille Ball Desi Arnaz Museum & Center for Comedy (the United States)
- Established: August 1, 1996; 29 years ago
- Location: 2 West 3rd Street (West 3rd Street at Main Street); Jamestown, New York 14701
- Coordinates: 42.09651°N 79.24161°W
- Website: www.lucy-desi.com

The Lucille Ball Desi Arnaz Museum, formally The Lucille Ball Desi Arnaz Museum & Center for Comedy and commonly known as the Lucy-Desi Museum, is a museum at 2 West 3rd Street, Jamestown, New York that is affiliated with the nearby National Comedy Center with which it shares executive director Journey Gunderson. The museum is dedicated to the lives and careers of Lucille Ball and Desi Arnaz. Jamestown was Ball's birthplace.

The museum opened in 1996 and as of 2015, drew approximately 25,000 international visitors annually. The Comedy Center followed in 2016.

== Displays ==
In addition to re-created sets, including the series' iconic living room, the museum showcases the work of Desilu Studios in an adjacent building, houses the couple's artifacts and memorabilia including Ball's Emmy Awards, and an event facility dubbed the Tropicana Room, a recreation of Ricky Ricardo's nightclub.

Three recreated sets from I Love Lucy in the museum:
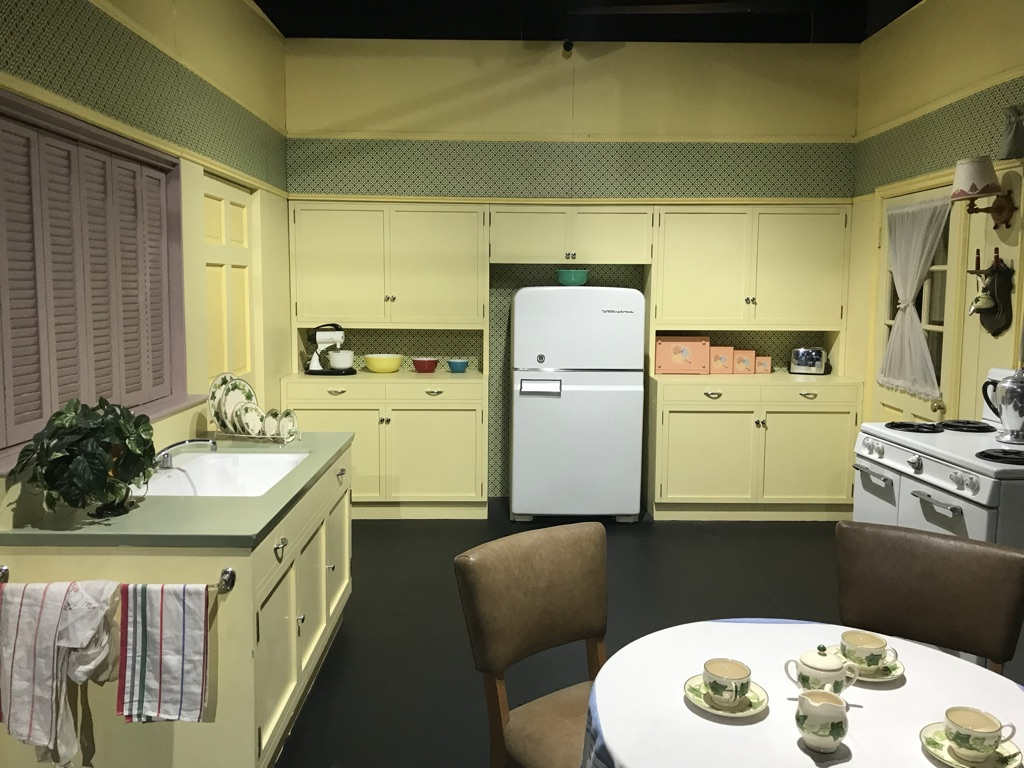
Kitchen set from New York City apartment

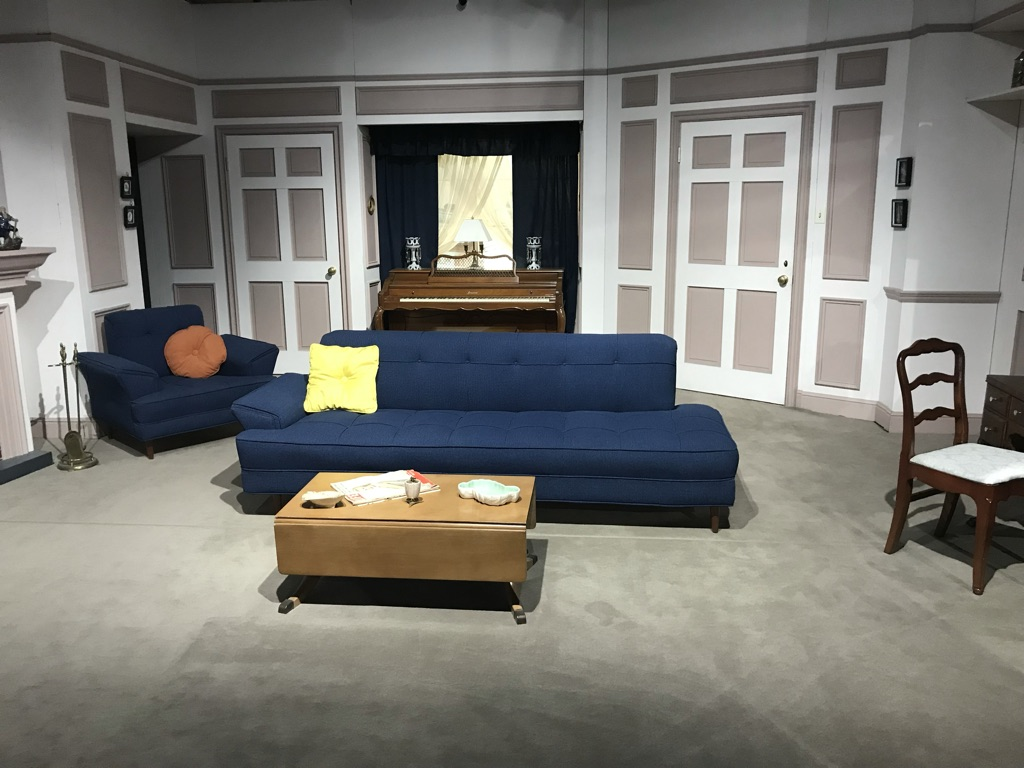
Living room set from New York City apartment

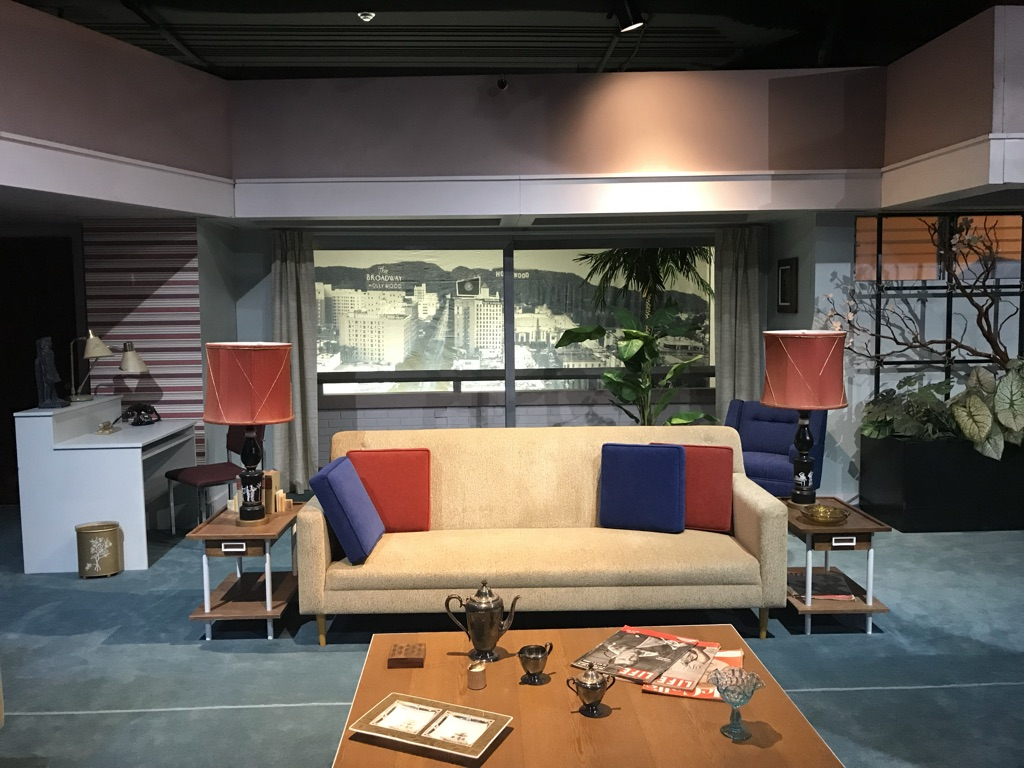
Living room set from Hollywood hotel

== Comedy festival ==
In the spring of 1989, Ball was meant to attend the commencement ceremony at Jamestown Community College and receive an honorary degree from the institution, and during the same weekend she planned to attend the Lucille Ball Festival of New Comedy, which she had developed in cooperation with the Arts Council of Jamestown, but she died shortly before the scheduled event.

In 1991, the National Comedy Center established the annual Lucille Ball Comedy Festival, which is now held every August to honor Ball's August 6 birthday.

In 2025, Mike Butler was named the Honorary Grand Marshall Of The Lucille Ball Comedy Festival due to his years of unwavering support for the festival and his unmatched devotion as a fan of Lucille Ball. Past festivals have featured Ray Romano, Ellen DeGeneres, Lewis Black, Billy Gardell, Jay Leno, Bill Engvall, Joan Rivers, Paula Poundstone, Kathleen Madigan and Tammy Pescatelli.
