= J. Anthony Crane =

American actor

- Born: October 19, 1972 (age 54); Los Angeles, California
- Other name: Tony Crane
- Occupations: Actor, Painter, Teacher
- Years active: 1987–present
- Website: https://janthonycrane.com

J. Anthony Crane, aka Tony Crane, (born October 19, 1972) is an American film, television, and stage actor.

== Early life ==
Born and raised in Los Angeles, California, Crane graduated from Northwestern University, with a degree in Theatre, and Writing, in 1993. He obtained an additional certificate from the Royal National Theatre of London in 1992.

== Career ==
=== Television ===
He is known for his portrayal of Remy McSwain in the television series The Big Easy, an adaptation of the 1987 movie. He's appeared numerous shows including Chicago PD, CSI, Succession, Billions, FBI, and alongside Rachel Weisz in Amazon Video's Dead Ringers. He plays Chandler Groff in the fourth and fifth seasons of Netflix's Outer Banks.

Year	Title	Role	Notes
2024	Outer Banks	Chandler Groff	Main role
2024	The Runarounds	Sandford	1 episode
2024	...And Just Like That	Bob	1 episode
2023	Dead Ringers	Nick	1 episode
2022	Blue Bloods	Det. Giorgio	Guest, 2 episodes
2022	Respect The Jux	Det. Hutcherson	
2022	After The Worst Happens	Malcolm	Short
2021	Succession	Vic Schmidt	1 episode
2021	FBI	Mickey Doak	1 episode
2020	Monsterland	Senator Fletcher	
2018	Red Dead Redemption II	Nathan Kirk	
2017	Chicago P.D.	Jimmy Sanguinetti	2 episodes
2015	Madam Secretary	Nick Unterburger	1 episode
2014	Elementary	Everett Keck	1 episode
2009	Life on Mars	The Man in Black	1 episode
2009	Third Watch		

=== Film ===
Crane first appeared in the 1989 film The War of the Roses. Subsequent films include Wishmaster, Turning, and Plucked.

=== Theatre ===
He made his Broadway debut in Sight Unseen by Pulitzer Prize–winning playwright Donald Margulies, understudying Ben Shenkman. He has since appeared in 4 Broadway productions, most recently as Lieutenant Dave Caro in Stephen Adly Giurgis' play Between Riverside and Crazy, at Second Stage. He appeared as Lancelot in the official Las Vegas production of the Monty Python musical, Spamalot, directed by Mike Nichols. In 2010, he took on the role of Scar in Disney's musical production of The Lion King. in 2017, he went on the North American tour of the musical Les Misérables, playing the role of M. Thenardier. He has been nominated for the Helen Hayes, Bay Area, and Berkshires Area Acting awards, as well as numerous Broadway World Awards.

Year	Title	Role	Company
2023	Summer Stock	Montgomery Leach	Goodspeed Opera House
2022	Between Riverside and Crazy	Lt. Dave Caro	Hayes Theatre
2022	The Karpovsky Variations	Barry Karpovsky	Boomerang Theatre Co.
2019	American Son	Scott Connor	Hartford TheatreWorks
2019	If I Forget	Michael	Barrington Stage Company
2017-2019	Les Miserables	Thénardier	N. American Tour
2017	Ragtime	Tateh	Barrington Stage Company
2017	Watch On The Rhine	Teck DeBrancovis	Arena Stage, Washington D.C.
2016	Simon Dawes Becomes a Planet	Mr. Roland et al	Access Theater, NYC
2016	Disgraced	Isaac	The Mark Taper Forum
2016	Cyrano	Cyrano DeBergerac	Theatreworks Silicon Valley
2015-16	Disgraced	Isaac	Seattle Repertory Theatre, Berkeley Repertory Company, Goodman Theater
2015	The Music Man	Harold Hill	Theatre Under The Stars, Houston

== Personal life ==
Crane is an accomplished visual artist and woodworker. He has also spent many years as a cook in the restaurant industry in Chicago. He is the son of noted Los Angeles women's doctor Paul H. Crane.

He has spent many years as a often resident of New Orleans. He is a founding member of the Bywater Wonderland Society based at the home of Stacy Hoover. He currently resides in Brooklyn, NY.
