= Lucie Arnaz =

American actress (born 1951)

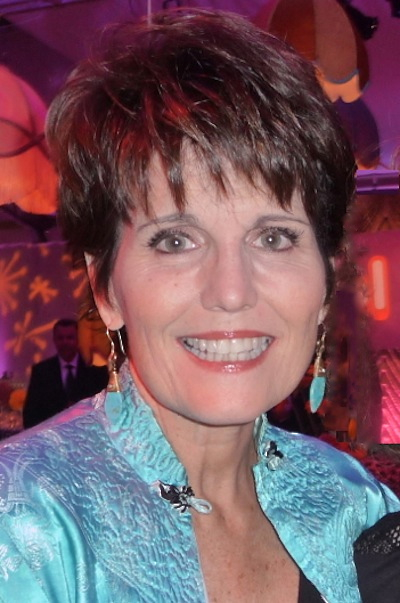
- Arnaz in 2013
- Born: Lucie Désirée Arnaz; July 17, 1951 (age 75); Los Angeles, California, U.S.
- Occupations: Actress; singer
- Years active: 1962–present
- Spouses: Philip Vandervort Menegaux (m. 1971; div. 1976) Laurence Luckinbill (m. 1980)
- Children: 3
- Parent(s): Desi Arnaz; Lucille Ball
- Relatives: Desi Arnaz Jr. (brother); Fred Ball (maternal uncle); Desiderio Alberto Arnaz II (paternal grandfather)
- Musical career
- Genres: Jazz; Latin music
- Instruments: Vocals; percussion

Lucie Désirée Arnaz Luckinbill (born July 17, 1951) is an American actress and singer. She is the daughter of actors Lucille Ball and Desi Arnaz, and the older sister of actor and musician Desi Arnaz, Jr.

== Early life ==
Arnaz was born at Cedars of Lebanon Hospital in Los Angeles, California, to actors Lucille Ball and Desi Arnaz. She has one younger brother, actor Desi Arnaz Jr.

When Arnaz was 10 years old, her family lived for a few years in New York City, where she and her brother attended St. Vincent Ferrer School. She later attended the all-girls, Roman Catholic Immaculate Heart High School in Los Angeles, mainly because of its drama program.

== Career ==
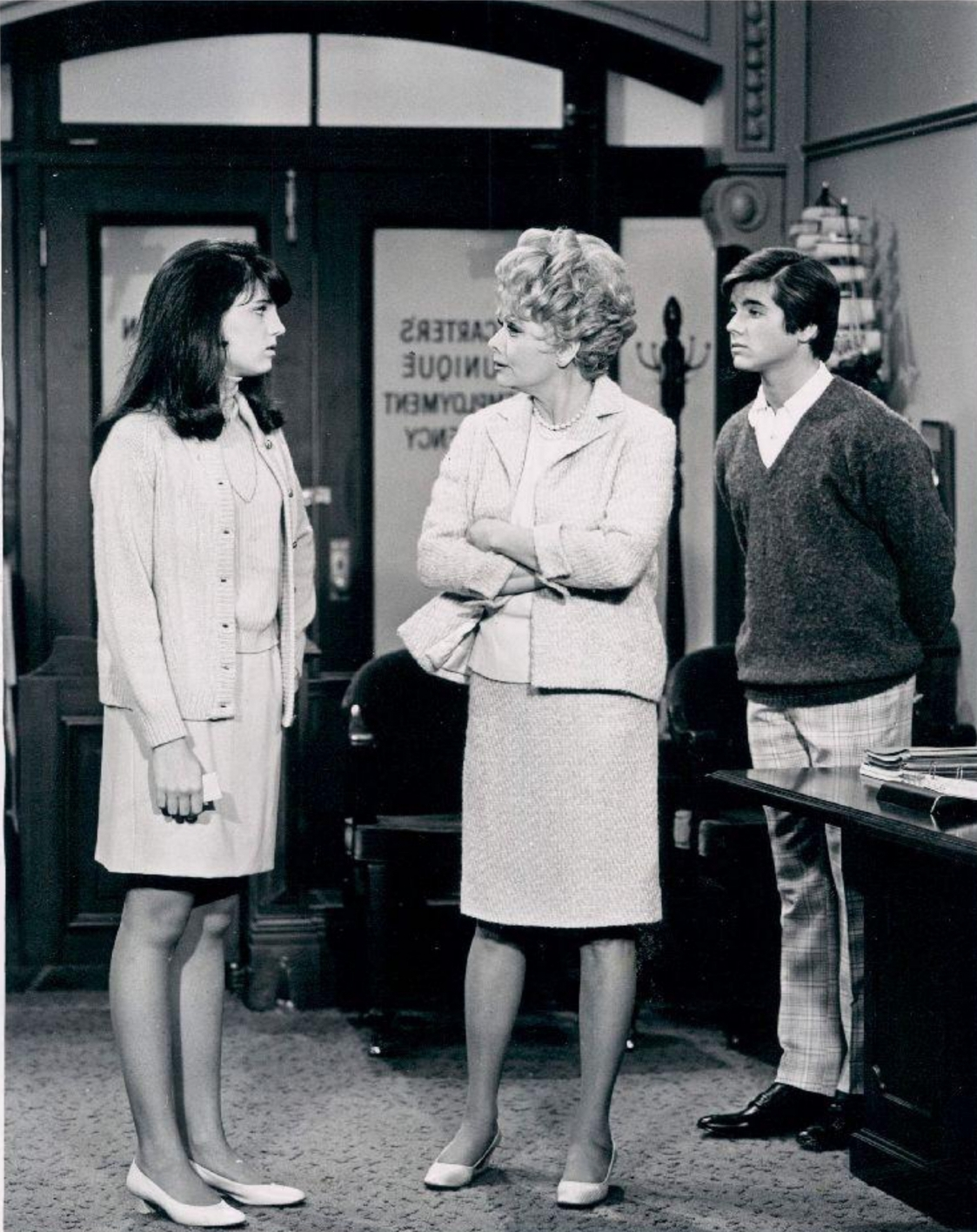
Arnaz, her mother Lucille Ball and her brother Desi Jr., in Here's Lucy, 1968

=== Television ===
Having had walk-on roles on her mother's previous television series The Lucy Show, Arnaz made her acting debut in a major role in the series Here's Lucy from 1968 to 1974. She played Kim Carter, the daughter of the eponymous Lucy Carter, played by her mother.

Arnaz branched out into television roles independent of her family from the mid-1970s. Sometime in the 1970s she appeared on Captain Kangaroo. In 1975, she played murder victim Elizabeth Short in an NBC telefilm of Who Is the Black Dahlia?, and she starred with Lyle Waggoner and Tommy Tune in Welcome to the "World", The Wonderful World of Disney special commemorating the grand opening of Space Mountain at Walt Disney World in Orlando, Florida. In 1978, she appeared in an episode of Fantasy Island as Toni Elgin, a woman desperately trying to save her marriage. She has continued to make appearances in a number of popular television series over the years, including Murder, She Wrote, Marcus Welby, M.D., Sons and Daughters (CBS, 1991), and Law & Order.

Arnaz also had a short-lived series of her own, The Lucie Arnaz Show, on CBS in 1985. A reviewer for The New York Times described the show as "the always ingratiating Miss Arnaz as a psychologist who not only writes an advice column, but also takes calls from listeners on her own radio program."

Another eponymous series, this one a late-night-style talk show, aired for one season from 1995 to 1996. It was unsuccessful, but The Rosie O'Donnell Show would use the same format a year later to much greater success, prompting Arnaz's agent to pitch a revival that would not be picked up.

Arnaz won an Emmy Award in 1993 for Outstanding Informational Special for her documentary about her parents, Lucy and Desi: A Home Movie at the 45th Primetime Emmy Awards.

=== Theatre ===
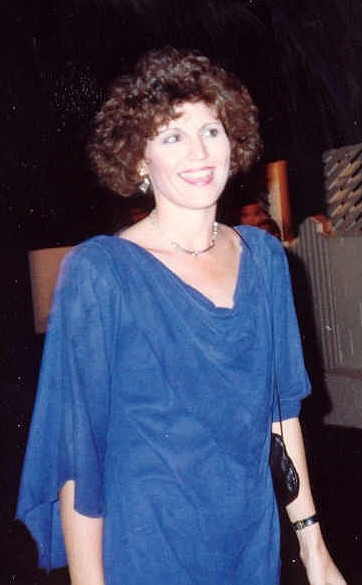
Arnaz in 1988

Arnaz has had a lengthy career in musical theatre. In June 1978 she played the title role of Annie Oakley in Annie Get Your Gun at the Jones Beach Theatre on Long Island, New York. This was the first production at Jones Beach Theatre after the death of longtime producer Guy Lombardo. In 1981, she played the lead female role of Rita White in Educating Rita at The Cape Playhouse in Dennis, Massachusetts.

She made her Broadway debut in February 1979 in the musical They're Playing Our Song. Arnaz won the Theatre World Award and the Los Angeles Drama Critics Circle Award for Best Actress in a Musical for her portrayal of Sonia Walsk. In 1986, she won the Sarah Siddons Award for her tour with Tommy Tune in the international company of the musical My One and Only.

She has numerous other theater credits, both in the United States and abroad: Seesaw (first national company, 1974), Whose Life Is It Anyway?, The Guardsman (Paper Mill Playhouse, Millburn, New Jersey, January 1984), The Wizard of Oz in Concert: Dreams Come True (Concert at Lincoln Center, 1995, televised), Sonia Flew (Coconut Grove Playhouse, Florida, April 2006), The Witches of Eastwick (London, Theatre Royal, Drury Lane, June 2000), Vanities (Mark Taper Forum, Los Angeles, 1976 as Kathy), Neil Simon's Lost in Yonkers (Broadway), Dirty Rotten Scoundrels (Broadway, May 23, 2006, to September 3, 2006), and Terence McNally's Master Class (Seacoast Repertory Theatre, Portsmouth, New Hampshire, April to May 1999).

In 2010, Arnaz performed (along with Raúl Esparza and Valarie Pettiford) in and directed Babalu: A Celebration of the Music of Desi Arnaz and His Orchestra. A Miami, Florida performance was given in July 2010.

She toured in Pippin in 2014, playing the role of Berthe, the title character's grandmother. She appeared on Broadway in Pippin, from October 9, 2014, to November 9, 2014.

=== Film ===
Arnaz made feature-film appearances, including The Jazz Singer (1980) in which she co-starred with Neil Diamond and Laurence Olivier. She earned a nomination for the Golden Globe Award for Best Supporting Actress in a Motion Picture at the 38th Golden Globe Awards. She also appeared in the 1982 comedy drama One More Try opposite her current husband, Laurence Luckinbill.

== Other works ==
- Arnaz was a Trustee on the Board of the American Theatre Wing for 15 years (1999–2014).
- In October 2008, Arnaz and longtime family friend, Hollywood columnist and Turner Classic Movies host Robert Osborne participated in a tribute to Arnaz's mother, Lucille Ball, at the Paley Center For Media in New York City. The program, "Lucie and Lucy: Lucie Arnaz Shares Treasures From The Family Video Collection", included a discussion between Osborne and Arnaz about Ball, and also focused on Ball's last long-running series, Here's Lucy (which was celebrating its 40th anniversary), as well as several of Ball's television specials and guest appearances during the 1970s, which Arnaz had donated to the Paley Center for Media.

== Preserving Lucille Ball and Desi Arnaz's legacy ==
- From about 2002 to 2007, Arnaz was the president of the board of directors of the Lucille Ball-Desi Arnaz Center in Jamestown, New York. She resigned over a dispute with the executive director over the future direction of the Center.
- Arnaz appeared live on stage in Jamestown at the Reg Lenna Center for the Arts on August 3, 2012, to promote the Lucille Ball Festival of New Comedy in which new comedians are invited to perform. She gave tribute to both her parents and expressed a desire to further expand the Festival of New Comedy and expand the Jamestown, New York, Lucy Fest. Comedians who performed at the 2012 Festival of New Comedy included Billy Gardell, Paula Poundstone and Tammy Pescatelli. She gave the history behind the Lucy-Desi Museum and Lucy-Desi Playhouse, and the 2011 birthday centenary for Lucille Ball (which was recorded in the Guinness Book of World Records for the highest number of people dressed like Lucille Ball in one place at one time).
- At that time, Arnaz announced intent to start using the recently renovated Jamestown Train Station to further the mission and vision of the Lucille Ball Festival of New Comedy. Lucie Arnaz praised and appeared on stage with the new executive director of the Lucille Ball-Desi Arnaz Center and applauded her work and dedication to the festival. This work culminated in the opening of the National Comedy Center in Jamestown on August 1, 2018.
- In 2021, Arnaz, along with her brother Desi Arnaz Jr., served as an executive producer of the biopic Being the Ricardos, a film written and directed by Aaron Sorkin focusing on her parents (played by Nicole Kidman and Javier Bardem)'s professional and personal relationship during the time of I Love Lucy.

== Personal life ==
Arnaz was married to Philip Vandervort Menegaux from July 17, 1971 (her 20th birthday) to April 1976. On June 22, 1980, she married actor-writer Laurence Luckinbill. Luckinbill and Arnaz live in Palm Springs, California.

Arnaz and Luckinbill have three children: Simon, Joseph and Katharine Luckinbill. Luckinbill also has two sons from his previous marriage: Nicholas and Benjamin Luckinbill.

Arnaz is a member of Unity.

== Filmography ==
Film
Year	Title	Role	Notes
1977	Billy Jack Goes to Washington	Saunders	
1980	The Jazz Singer	Molly Bell	Nominated — Golden Globe Award for Best Supporting Actress – Motion Picture
1983	Second Thoughts	Amy Ashe	
2000	Down to You	Judy Connelly	
2006	Wild Seven	Sylvia	
2009	The Pack	Eleanor Jordan	Also titled Smoking/Non-Smoking
2012	The Thought Exchange	Herself	
2014	Henry & Me	Mrs. McCarthy	Voice role
2021	Being the Ricardos	—N/a	Executive producer

== Television ==
Source: Archive of American Television:

Television
Year	Title	Role	Notes
1962–1963	The Lucy Show	Cynthia	3 episodes
1964	Password	Herself	Appeared alongside mother, brother, and stepfather
1965–1968	The Lucy Show	Various roles	5 episodes
1967	The Mothers-in-Law	Girl in golf cart	Episode: "Everybody Goes on a Honeymoon"; uncredited
1968–1974	Here's Lucy	Kim Carter	Main cast
1972	The Sixth Sense	Marguerite Webster	Episode: "With This Ring, I Thee Kill!"
1972	Rowan & Martin's Laugh-In	Herself	Episode #6.04
1975	Marcus Welby, M.D.	Jo Anne Bosley	Episode: "The Time Bomb"
1975	The Wonderful World of Disney	Herself	Episode: "Welcome to the "World"
1975	Who Is the Black Dahlia?	Elizabeth Short	Television film
1975	Death Scream	Judy	Television film
1978	Fantasy Island	Toni Elgin	Episode: "Reunion/Anniversary"
1980	The Mating Season	Sydney Wyatt	Television film
1982	Washington Mistress	Maggie Parker	Television film
1982	One More Try	Dede March	Unsold pilot for CBS
1985	The Lucie Arnaz Show	Dr. Jane Lucas	Lead role
1988	Who Gets the Friends?	Gloria McClinton	Television film
1988	Murder, She Wrote	Det. Bess Stacey	Episode: "Wearing of the Green"
1991	Sons and Daughters	Tess Hammersmith	Lead role
1993	Lucy and Desi: A Home Movie	Herself	Television special; also executive producer
1996	Abduction of Innocence: A Moment of Truth Movie	Helen Steves	Television film
1999	Bonne Nuit	Nina	Television film
2003	Law & Order	Jackie Scott	Episode: "Bitch"
2020	Will & Grace	Factory Boss	Episode: "We Love Lucy"

== Stage ==
- Once Upon a Mattress (Kenley Players, 1973)
- Seesaw (tour, 1974)
- Vanities (Los Angeles, 1976)
- Bye Bye Birdie (The Melody Top, 1977)
- Annie Get Your Gun (Jones Beach Theater, NY, 1979)
- They're Playing Our Song (Broadway, 1979)
- My One and Only (tour, 1986)
- Lost in Yonkers (Broadway, 1992)
- Wonderful Town (California, 1997 and 1999)
- Master Class (New Hampshire, 1999)
- The Witches of Eastwick (London, 2000)
- Dirty Rotten Scoundrels (Broadway, 2006)
- Pippin (Broadway and tour, 2014)
