= Arje Shaw =

American theater producer (1941–2018)

Arje Shaw (December 1, 1941 – March 10, 2018) was a Broadway producer, music producer, playwright and author, best known for his role as the creator and producer of the Broadway show The gathering in 1999.

== Theater ==
Shaw made his off-Broadway debut in 1992 with his first comedy, A Catered affair, in collaboration with film and Broadway producer George W. George.

He later proceeded to create and produce the Broadway production of The Gathering starring Hal Linden and Jesse Eisenberg, which followed the off-Broadway production starring Theodore Bikel. The New York Times hailed The Gathering as "thoughtful, provocative, filled with humor and warmth, fierce drama, potent theater. Entertains as it touches the heart and stimulates the mind."

His 2004 production of Magic Hands Freddy received positive reviews by The New York Times the play was written by Shaw and directed by Rebecca Taylor.

Mr. Shaw's first book, The Fix, was published by Library Tales Publishing in New York City on May 1, 2011. Shaw also stars in the 2012 The Thought Exchange film as himself.

== Music ==
Arje Shaw was the creator of The Sonnet Man, a music production company representing the Shakespeare Hip Hop fusion artist Devon Glover.

== Personal life ==
Arje Shaw was Jewish. His father fled the Nazis, after being nearly beaten to death, and settled in Tashkent, Uzbekistan. Later, the family spent three years in a refugee camp at Bergen-Belsen, where hunger and deprivation played a searing role. Ultimately the family migrated to the United States. His childhood experiences were said to make their mark in Shaw's plays. Arje died on March 10, 2018, after a very rapid decline from metastatic lung cancer.
