= Buffalo Southern Railroad =

Class III railroad operating in New York

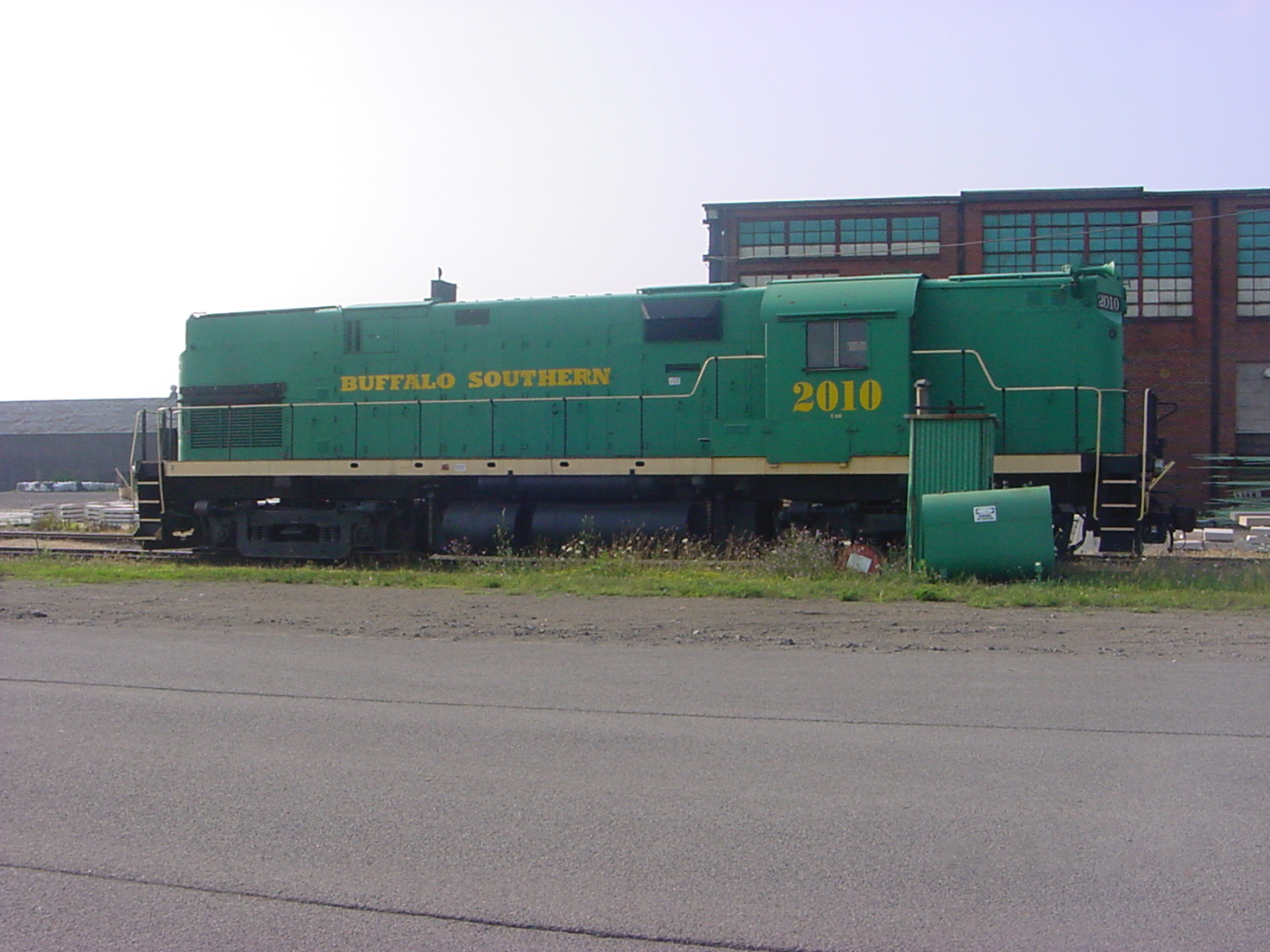
- Buffalo Southern Railroad Locomotive #2010 at the former Bethlehem Steel plant in Lackawanna, New York.

Overview
- Headquarters: Eden
- Reporting mark: BSOR
- Locale: Western New York
- Dates of operation: 1982–
- Predecessor: Conrail

Technical
- Track gauge: 4 ft 8 1/2 in (1,435 mm) standard gauge
- Length: 32 miles (51 km)

Other

The Buffalo Southern Railroad (reporting mark BSOR) is a class III railroad operating in western New York.

The BSOR is locally owned and operates in the Buffalo area. It should not be confused with the South Buffalo Railway which is a separate railroad.

The BSOR operates on 32 miles of track owned by Erie County, New York and leased from the Erie County Industrial Development Agency. The line runs south from Buffalo, New York to Gowanda, New York servicing the villages of Hamburg and North Collins along the way.

It interchanges with Norfolk Southern Railway, CSX Transportation, Canadian Pacific Railway, Buffalo and Pittsburgh Railroad and the New York and Lake Erie Railroad. The rail line intersects Norfolk Southern at a diamond in the village of Blasdell near Lake Avenue.

== Operations ==
BSOR traffic includes animal feed, fertilizer, propane, lumber, scrap metal, cement, aggregates, brick, and paper. The annual tonnage hauled is 50,046 using 556 carloads per year. Trains operate on demand, typically several times per week.

The company offers services such as car switching, car unloading, and locomotive leasing and servicing. It operates the Buffalo Creek yard in Eden, New York and has locomotive maintenance facilities in Hamburg, New York.

BSOR locomotives are painted green with yellow trim.
