= Chautauqua Area Rural Transit System =

Public transportation system in New York State

Chautauqua Area Regional Transit System
- Headquarters: Jamestown, NY
- Service area: Chautauqua County, New York
- Service type: bus service
- Hubs: 4
- Website: Official website

The Chautauqua Area Regional Transit System (CARTS) operates from two terminals in Dunkirk and Jamestown serving almost every city, town, village and hamlet of Chautauqua County, New York with a weekday scheduled public transit service.

In addition to the loop runs that are offered throughout the county, the CARTS system operates the urban bus services in Dunkirk and Fredonia, as well as Jamestown.

== Fleet ==
Due to the rural nature of much of the county and the small populations of Jamestown, Dunkirk and Fredonia, the CARTS system operates using smaller Ford E-Series cutaway-style vans.

== Transportation hubs ==
CARTS uses a number of carefully placed transfer hubs where passengers may connect easily between two routes. Some buses may even continue between different routes, not requiring a transfer between vehicles.

- Dunkirk - The Junction (Dunkirk City Hall)
- Jamestown - The Junction (Main & Third Streets)
- Lakewood - Chautauqua Mall
- Mayville - Chautauqua County Office Building

== Routes ==
Many of CARTS' runs operate on a fixed route, with demand service up to one-quarter mile from the fixed route, for a premium fare.

=== County loop runs ===
A number of individual routes exist that serve some of the area hospitals, workplaces and shopping plazas.

The routes are grouped into a number of service sectors, called:

- North County
- South County
- Lake Run via NY 394
- Lake Run via NY 430
- West County

=== Cities of Dunkirk and Fredonia ===
Service to the City of Dunkirk is offered using two buses operating on a loosely based loop route.

The two routes (green or red) are essentially the same, with the exception being in the direction travelled

Service is operated weekdays only, between 7:30am and 5:30pm.

Connections can be made at The Junction (Dunkirk City Hall) to other CARTS routes.

=== City of Jamestown ===
Much of the service in the City of Jamestown operates with "loop" style routing on a hub-and-spoke model, in which all bus routes meet at a central location in downtown Jamestown. Services either make a clockwise or counterclockwise loop after leaving The Junction at West Third and Main Streets at hourly intervals for City of Jamestown service, or 45 minute intervals for Jamestown suburban service to Falconer or 90 minute intervals to Lakewood via Fairmount, or Lakewood via Jones and Gifford routes

- Baker (Red)
- Falconer (Orange)
- Lakewood - Fairmount (Blue)
- Lakewood - Jones & Gifford (Teal)
- North Main (Lilac)
- South West Express (Pink)
- Willard (Green)
