= New York Independent Theater Awards =

Awards given annually for excellence in off-off-Broadway theatre

- Awarded for: Excellence in off-off-Broadway theatre
- Country: United States
- Presented by: The League of Independent Theater
- First award: September 19, 2005; 21 years ago
- Website: Official website

The New York Independent Theater Awards (also known as NYIT Awards and IT Awards) are accolades given annually by The League of Independent Theater to honor individuals and organizations who have achieved artistic excellence in off-off-Broadway theatre.

The awards – created by The New York Innovative Theatre Foundation in 2004 – were formerly known as the New York Innovative Theatre Awards. They were renamed in 2022 upon the Foundation's merger with The League of Independent Theater, who now administer the awards.

== History ==
The New York Innovative Theatre Foundation was created in 2004 by Jason Bowcutt, Shay Gines and Nick Micozzi to bring recognition to artistic output and heritage of New York City's Off-Off-Broadway community. The organization advocated for Off-Off-Broadway and recognized the unique and essential role it plays in contributing to American and global culture.

In 2022, the foundation merged with The League of Independent Theater, with the awards renamed The New York Independent Theater Awards.

== Categories ==
Competitive Awards

- Outstanding Ensemble
- Outstanding Solo Performance
- Outstanding Actor In A Lead Role
- Outstanding Actress In A Lead Role
- Outstanding Actor In A Featured Role
- Outstanding Actress In A Featured Role
- Outstanding Choreography / Movement
- Outstanding Director
- Outstanding Set Design
- Outstanding Lighting Design
- Outstanding Costume Design
- Outstanding Sound Design
- Outstanding Original Music
- Outstanding Original Short Script
- Outstanding Original Full-Length Script
- Outstanding Performance Art Production
- Outstanding Production of a Musical
- Outstanding Production of a Play

Honorary Awards

- The Artistic Achievement Award - for significant artistic contribution to the Off-Off-Broadway community.
- The Ellen Stewart Award - for significant contribution to the Off-Off-Broadway community through service, support and leadership.
- The Caffe Cino Fellowship Award - for consistent production of outstanding work.
- The Outstanding Stage Manager Award.
- The Indie Theater Champion Award - for advancing the independent theater community through positive social justice actions during the past year.
- The Doric Wilson Independent Playwright Award - for commitment to independent theater.

== Ceremony ==
Season	Awards ceremony	Location	Awards ceremony host(s)
2004–05	Sept. 19, 2005	Lucille Lortel Theatre	Charles Busch
2005–06	Sept. 18, 2006	Cooper Union	Charles Busch
2006–07	Sept. 24, 2007	Fashion Institute of Technology	Julie Halston
2007–08	Sept. 22, 2008	Fashion Institute of Technology	Lisa Kron
2008–09	Sept. 21, 2009	New World Stages	Julie Halston
2009–10	Sept 20, 2010	Cooper Union	Lisa Kron
2010–11	Sept. 19, 2011	Cooper Union	Harrison Greenbaum
2011–12	Sept. 24, 2012	Kaye Playhouse	Harrison Greenbaum
2012–13	Sept. 30, 2013	Baruch Performing Arts Center	Harrison Greenbaum
2013–14	Sept. 24, 2014	Baruch Performing Arts Center	Jason Kravits
2014–15	Sept. 21, 2015	Baruch Performing Arts Center	Jason Kravits
2015–16	Sept 26. 2016	Kaye Playhouse	Jason Kravits
2016–17	Sept. 25, 2017	Gerald Lynch Theater	Jason Kravits
2017–18	Sept. 24, 2018	Centennial Memorial Theatre	Becca Blackwell
2018–19	Sept. 16, 2019	Centennial Memorial Theatre	Bradford Scobie
2019–20	Did not occur due to COVID-19 Pandemic		
2020–21	Nov. 14, 2021	Kraine Theater	Shalewa Sharpe and Courtney Fearrington
2021–22	Did not occur		
2022–23	June 26, 2023	Brooklyn Art Haus	Shalewa Sharpe
2023–24	Sept. 9, 2024	Brooklyn Art Haus	
