= List of Here's Lucy episodes =

This is a list of all episodes of the television sitcom Here's Lucy, the successor to The Lucy Show. Each season ran for a total of 24 episodes.

== Series overview ==
Season	Episodes	Originally released		Rank	Rating	Households (millions)
Season	Episodes	First released	Last released	Rank	Rating	Households (millions)
1	24	September 23, 1968	March 17, 1969	9	23.8	13.86
2	24	September 22, 1969	March 2, 1970	6	23.9	13.98
3	24	September 14, 1970	February 22, 1971	3	26.1	15.69
4	24	September 13, 1971	February 21, 1972	10	23.7 (Note: Tied with The Mary Tyler Moore Show.)	14.72
5	24	September 11, 1972	March 5, 1973	15	21.9	14.19
6	24	September 10, 1973	March 18, 1974	29	20.0	13.24

== Episodes ==
=== Season 1 (1968–69) ===
No. overall	No. in season	Title	Directed by	Written by	Original release date
1	1	"Mod, Mod Lucy"	Jack Donohue	Milt Josefsberg & Ray Singer	September 23, 1968
When Kim loses her voice, Lucy takes her place in Craig's band for a birthday party performance.
2	2	"Lucy Visits Jack Benny"	Jack Donohue	Milt Josefsberg & Ray Singer	September 30, 1968
Jack Benny rents a room out to Lucy at a "reasonable rate". Cameo: Jackie Gleason as Ralph Kramden.
3	3	"Lucy the Process Server"	Jack Donohue	George Balzer and Phil Leslie	October 7, 1968
Lucy loses $1500 of Harry's money while trying to serve a summons.
4	4	"Lucy and Miss Shelley Winters"	Jack Donohue	Milt Josefsberg & Ray Singer	October 14, 1968
A movie star (Shelley Winters) gains weight as a result of her compulsive eating, so Lucy tries to help her lose it.
5	5	"Lucy, the Conclusion Jumper"	Jack Donohue	Phil Leslie & George Balzer	October 21, 1968
A series of misunderstandings leads Lucy to believe that Kim is planning to get married.
6	6	"Lucy's Impossible Mission"	Jack Donohue	Bob O'Brien	October 28, 1968
In an homage to Mission: Impossible, Lucy tries to get a microfilm out of a Middle Eastern diplomat's shoe.
7	7	"Lucy and Eva Gabor"	Jack Donohue	Ray Singer and Milt Josefsberg	November 11, 1968
A writer (Eva Gabor) wants quiet at the Carter household.
8	8	"Lucy's Birthday"	Jack Donohue	Milt Josefsberg & Ray Singer	November 18, 1968
Lucy is treated to dinner at a Chinese restaurant for her birthday.
9	9	"Lucy Sells Craig to Wayne Newton"	Jack Donohue	Bob O'Brien	November 25, 1968
Lucy talks Wayne Newton into giving Craig an audition as a drummer for his back-up band.
10	10	"Lucy's Working Daughter"	Jack Donohue	Bob O'Brien	December 2, 1968
Lucy tries too hard to help Kim with her new job, then jumps to her rescue from an unpleasant customer.
11	11	"Guess Who Owes Lucy $23.50"	Jack Donohue	Fred S. Fox and Seaman Jacobs	December 9, 1968
A con man pretending to be Van Johnson scams Lucy out of $23.50.
12	12	"Lucy the Matchmaker"	Jack Donohue	Milt Josefsberg & Ray Singer	December 16, 1968
Lucy goes to a computer dating service to find a date for Uncle Harry. Imagine her surprise when his match turns out to be her old friend Vivian (Guest star Vivian Vance).
13	13	"Lucy and the Gold Rush"	Jack Donohue	Howard Harris and Ben Gershman	December 23, 1968
Kim and Craig begin a gold rush when they bring home a rock weighing 14 karats that gives Harry gold fever.
14	14	"Lucy, the Fixer"	Jack Donohue	Milt Josefsberg & Ray Singer	January 6, 1969
Lucy tries to fix Harry's broken light switch, and ends up tearing apart his house.
15	15	"Lucy and the Ex-Con"	Jack Donohue	Bob O'Brien	January 13, 1969
After Lucy helps an ex-convict (Wally Cox) find work, the man is suspected of robbing his new employer.
16	16	"Lucy Goes on Strike"	Jack Donohue	Mel Diamond and Al Schwartz	January 20, 1969
After Lucy stages a strike in order to loosen up Uncle Harry, she overhears him discussing life insurance and thinks he's planning to kill her.
17	17	"Lucy and Carol Burnett"	Jack Donohue	Bob O'Brien	January 27, 1969
Lucy talks Carol Burnett into helping her raise funds for a high school musical.
18	18	"Lucy and the Great Airport Chase"	Jack Donohue	Tommy Thompson	February 3, 1969
Lucy and Harry get involved with spies after a secret formula at a Los Angeles airport.
19	19	"A Date for Lucy"	Jack Donohue	Fred S. Fox and Seaman Jacobs	February 10, 1969
Lucy discovers that her date (Cesar Romero) for a banquet is a jewel thief.
20	20	"Lucy the Shopping Expert"	Jack Donohue	Milt Josefsberg and Al Schwartz	February 17, 1969
Lucy teaches Kim about shopping at the supermarket.
21	21	"Lucy Gets Her Man"	Jack Donohue	Fred S. Fox and Seaman Jacobs	February 24, 1969
Lucy goes undercover to catch a spy.
22	22	"Lucy's Safari"	Jack Donohue	Bob O'Brien	March 3, 1969
The Carters go on a safari with a professional hunter.
23	23	"Lucy and Tennessee Ernie's Fun Farm"	Jack Donohue	Bob O'Brien	March 10, 1969
Lucy helps Tennessee Ernie Ford with his farm.
24	24	"Lucy Helps Craig Get His Driver's License"	Jack Donohue	Milt Josefsberg & Ray Singer	March 17, 1969
Lucy gives instructions from the back seat as Craig takes his driving test.

=== Season 2 (1969–70) ===
No. overall	No. in season	Title	Directed by	Written by	Original release date
25	1	"Lucy Goes to the Air Force Academy: Part 1"	George Marshall	Gene Thompson	September 22, 1969
Lucy begins her misadventures at the Air Force Academy.
26	2	"Lucy Goes to the Air Force Academy: Part 2"	George Marshall	Gene Thompson	September 29, 1969
Lucy's hijinks at the Air Force Academy continue.
27	3	"Lucy and the Indian Chief"	George Marshall	Gene Thompson	October 6, 1969
Lucy unintentionally marries an Indian chief in Navaho country.
28	4	"Lucy Runs the Rapids"	George Marshall	Gene Thompson	October 13, 1969
The Carters end up taking ride down the Colorado River rapids.
29	5	"Lucy and Harry's Tonsils"	George Marshall	Milt Josefsberg & Ray Singer	October 20, 1969
Harry needs a tonsillectomy and only stays in the hospital for the attractive nurse.
30	6	"Lucy and the Andrews Sisters"	George Marshall	Milt Josefsberg & Ray Singer	October 27, 1969
The Carters help Patty Andrews recreate the Andrews Sisters.
31	7	"Lucy's Burglar Alarm"	George Marshall	Milt Josefsberg & Ray Singer	November 3, 1969
The Carters install a home-made alarm system after a burglar makes off with $1.19 and their TV set.
32	8	"Lucy at the Drive-In Movie"	George Marshall	Ray Singer and Milt Josefsberg	November 10, 1969
Lucy and Harry disguise themselves as hippies to spy on Kim and her date at the drive-in theater.
33	9	"Lucy and the Used Car Dealer"	George Marshall	David Ketchum and Bruce Shelly	November 17, 1969
When a car Kim and Craig bought from a used-car salesman breaks down, Lucy and Harry plot to trick the salesman into taking the car back for more than its worth.
34	10	"Lucy, the Cement Worker"	George Marshall	George Balzer and Sam Perrin	November 24, 1969
Lucy disguises herself as a cement worker on the grounds that she may have lost an antique ring in wet cement.
35	11	"Lucy and Johnny Carson"	George Marshall	Milt Josefsberg & Ray Singer	December 1, 1969
Lucy and Harry see Johnny Carson and Ed MacMahon at the brown derby where Lucy has won a free dinner in an audience contest on The Tonight Show.
36	12	"Lucy and the Generation Gap"	Jack Baker	Fred S. Fox and Seaman Jacobs	December 8, 1969
Lucy and Harry are cast as the parents in a school play produced by Kim and Craig about the Generation Gap.
37	13	"Lucy and the Bogie Affair"	Herbert Kenwith	Pat McCormick and Jim McGinn	December 15, 1969
Kim and Craig bring home a lost sheepdog that gives birth to nine puppies. Guest star Jack LaLanne
38	14	"Lucy Protects Her Job"	Danny Dayton	Sam Perrin and Ralph Goodman	December 22, 1969
Lucy suspects Harry of trying replace her, so she has Kim pose as a new secretary to sabotage the idea.
39	15	"Lucy the Helpful Mother"	Herbert Kenwith	Milt Josefsberg and Al Schwartz	December 29, 1969
When Kim and Craig get part-time jobs to pay for their own phones, Lucy ends up having to help with their workloads.
40	16	"Lucy and Liberace"	Jack Baker	Fred S. Fox and Seaman Jacobs	January 5, 1970
Lucy thinks Craig stole Liberace's candelabra and tries to return it.
41	17	"Lucy the Laundress"	Herbert Kenwith	Larry Rhine and Lou Derman	January 12, 1970
Lucy works part-time at a Chinese laundry to pay for the damages after she drives her car into it.
42	18	"Lucy and Lawrence Welk"	Herbert Kenwith	Martin A. Ragaway	January 19, 1970
Lucy fixes Viv up with Lawrence Welk.
43	19	"Lucy and Viv Visit Tijuana"	Herbert Kenwith	Milt Josefsberg & Ray Singer	January 26, 1970
Lucy and Viv travel to Tijuana where smugglers trick them into taking stolen jewels across the border.
44	20	"Lucy and Ann Margret"	Herbert Kenwith	Milt Josefsberg & Ray Singer	February 2, 1970
Craig does a duet with Ann-Margret on television.
45	21	"Lucy and Wally Cox"	Jay Sandrich	Ray Singer and Milt Josefsberg	February 9, 1970
Lucy attempts to change a father's image of his son (Wally Cox) by helping him guard a warehouse.
46	22	"Lucy and Wayne Newton"	Danny Dayton	Ray Singer and Milt Josefsberg	February 16, 1970
Wayne Newton hires the Carters as ranch hands for returning his lost horse.
47	23	"Lucy Takes Over"	Jay Sandrich	William Raynor and Myles Wilder	February 23, 1970
Lucy becomes the boss of the Employment Agency after it's discovered in a diary belonging to her great-grandmother that Harry's side of the family has owed Lucy's side a large debt for a hundred years.
48	24	"Lucy Competes with Carol Burnett"	Jay Sandrich	Lou Derman and Larry Rhine	March 2, 1970
Lucy competes with Carol Krausmeyer (Carol Burnett) in a "Secretary Beautiful" contest.

=== Season 3 (1970–71) ===
No. overall	No. in season	Title	Directed by	Written by	Original release date
49	1	"Lucy Meets the Burtons"	Jerry Paris	Bob Carroll, Jr. and Madelyn Davis	September 14, 1970
Lucy gets Elizabeth Taylor's diamond ring stuck on her finger just as Miss Taylor and Richard Burton are scheduled for a press party.
50	2	"Lucy the Skydiver"	Herbert Kenwith	Larry Rhine and Lou Derman	September 21, 1970
To scare Kim and Craig off their new hobbies, Lucy takes up skydiving that Harry uses for publicity.
51	3	"Lucy and Sammy Davis, Jr."	Herbert Kenwith	Sam Perrin and Ralph Goodman	September 28, 1970
After Lucy hits Sammy Davis, Jr. with the door to the employment agency, he threatens to sue if his nose looks different for the movie he's filming.
52	4	"Lucy and the Drum Contest"	Jerry Paris	Martin A. Ragaway	October 5, 1970
Craig decides to enter a drum contest after seeing Buddy Rich.
53	5	"Lucy, the Crusader"	Herbert Kenwith	Milt Josefsberg and Al Schwartz	October 12, 1970
Lucy begins a crusade against defective merchandise and meaningless guarantees when she buys a record player for Craig's birthday that doesn't work.
54	6	"Lucy, the Coed"	Jack Baker	Fred S. Fox and Seaman Jacobs	October 19, 1970
Harry and his old college buddies stage a musical variety show about the Roaring '20s.
55	7	"Lucy the American Mother"	Jack Donohue	Lou Derman and Larry Rhine	October 26, 1970
Craig features Lucy in a documentary about mothers.
56	8	"Lucy's Wedding Party"	Jack Donohue	Sam Perrin and Ralph Goodman	November 2, 1970
Lucy uses Uncle Harry's house for a Greek wedding reception while he's at his college reunion.
57	9	"Lucy Cuts Vincent's Price"	Herbert Kenwith	Martin A. Ragaway	November 9, 1970
Vincent Price mistakes Lucy for an actress in his new horror movie when she calls him about a painting she unintentionally won in an auction.
58	10	"Lucy and the Diamond Cutter"	Herbert Kenwith	Milt Josefsberg and Al Schwartz	November 16, 1970
A diamond cutter wants absolute quiet as he works on a famous stone in the Carter household.
59	11	"Lucy and Jack Benny's Biography"	Herbert Kenwith	Milt Josefsberg & Ray Singer	November 23, 1970
Harry sends Lucy to Jack Benny's house to write his biography.
60	12	"Lucy and Rudy Vallee"	Coby Ruskin	David Ketchum and Bruce Shelly	November 30, 1970
Lucy tries to make Rudy Vallee a rock star.
61	13	"Lucy Loses Her Cool"	Herbert Kenwith	Milt Josefsberg & Ray Singer	December 7, 1970
Lucy is promised $500 by Art Linkletter if she can keep her cool for 24 hours.
62	14	"Lucy the Part-Time Wife"	Ross Martin	Larry Rhine and Lou Derman	December 14, 1970
Harry talks Lucy into pretending to be his pregnant wife to discourage an old flame.
63	15	"Lucy and Ma Parker"	Herbert Kenwith	Larry Rhine and Lou Derman	December 21, 1970
Lucy's new neighbor is Ma Parker, the leader of a gang of criminals who are little people.
64	16	"Lucy Stops a Marriage"	Jack Donohue	Frank Gill, Jr. and Vincent Bogert	December 28, 1970
Lucy thinks Harry is trying to marry a rich widow for her money, but he is really trying to get her to invest in his business.
65	17	"Lucy's Vacation"	Coby Ruskin	Fred S. Fox and Seaman Jacobs	January 4, 1971
Lucy tries to get herself fired to take a vacation just as Harry's psychiatrist convinces him to not get angry with her.
66	18	"Lucy and the 20-20 Vision"	Jack Carter	Phil Leslie & George Balzer	January 11, 1971
Lucy tries to convince Harry he needs glasses hoping it will get him to lighten up.
67	19	"Lucy and the Raffle"	Ross Martin	Ray Singer and Al Schwartz	January 18, 1971
When Kim wins a car in a raffle, the Carters hold one of their own to pay the tax.
68	20	"Lucy's House Guest, Harry"	Charles Walters	Fred S. Fox and Seaman Jacobs	January 25, 1971
Harry becomes Lucy's house guest while his house is being redecorated, and he starts driving her crazy.
69	21	"Lucy and Aladdin's Lamp"	Charles Walters	Frank Gill, Jr. and Vincent Bogert	February 1, 1971
Lucy thinks she may have found Aladdin's lamp after all her family's wishes seem to come true.
70	22	"Lucy and Carol Burnett Salute Hollywood"	Jack Carter	Ray Singer and Al Schwartz	February 8, 1971
Lucy and Carol salute Hollywood with a musical variety show.
71	23	"Lucy Goes Hawaiian: Part 1"	Jack Donohue	Milt Josefsberg, Al Schwartz & Ray Singer	February 15, 1971
Lucy gets a job as a social director on a Hawaiian ocean liner.
72	24	"Lucy Goes Hawaiian: Part 2"	Jack Donohue	Ray Singer, Al Schwartz and Milt Josefsberg	February 22, 1971
Lucy and the gang put on a show on the ocean liner.

=== Season 4 (1971–72) ===
No. overall	No. in season	Title	Directed by	Written by	Original release date
73	1	"Lucy and Flip Go Legit"	Coby Ruskin	Bob Carroll, Jr. and Madelyn Davis	September 13, 1971
Flip Wilson plays the role of Prissy in a local production of Gone with the Wind.
74	2	"Lucy and the Mountain Climber"	Coby Ruskin	Lou Derman and Larry Rhine	September 20, 1971
After Harry takes on a partner in the agency, Lucy competes with the health fanatic in a mountain-climbing contest in order to keep her job.
75	3	"Lucy and Harry's Italian Bombshell"	Coby Ruskin	Fred S. Fox and Seaman Jacobs	September 27, 1971
An Italian woman (Kaye Ballard) Harry met during World War II is coming to visit him.
76	4	"Lucy and Mannix Are Held Hostage"	Coby Ruskin	Bob Carroll, Jr. and Madelyn Davis	October 4, 1971
Detective Joe Mannix (from Mannix) tries to protect Lucy after she identifies a pair of bank robbers.
77	5	"Lucy and the Astronauts"	Coby Ruskin	Lou Derman and Larry Rhine	October 11, 1971
Lucy is quarantined along with returning astronauts.
78	6	"Lucy Makes a Few Extra Dollars"	Coby Ruskin	Phil Leslie and Ralph Goodman	October 18, 1971
Lucy goes through several schemes to get a raise from Harry, including posing as a counterfeiter.
79	7	"Someone's On the Ski Lift with Dinah"	Coby Ruskin	Bob Carroll, Jr. and Madelyn Davis	October 25, 1971
Joining Harry on a vacation to the mountains, Lucy gets stuck on a ski lift with Dinah Shore.
80	8	"Lucy and Her All-Nun Band"	Coby Ruskin	Bob Carroll, Jr. and Madelyn Davis	November 1, 1971
Lucy books an all-nun band for a benefit.
81	9	"Won't You Calm Down, Dan Dailey?"	Coby Ruskin	Bob Carroll, Jr. and Madelyn Davis	November 8, 1971
Lucy drives Dan Dailey crazy with her amorous behavior.
82	10	"Lucy and the Celebrities"	Coby Ruskin	Milt Josefsberg and Al Schwartz	November 15, 1971
Lucy tries to get celebrity endorsements for the agency.
83	11	"Ginger Rogers Comes to Tea"	Coby Ruskin	Bob Carroll, Jr. and Madelyn Davis	November 22, 1971
Lucy has an afternoon tea with Ginger Rogers.
84	12	"Lucy Helps David Frost Go Night-Night"	Coby Ruskin	Bob Carroll, Jr. and Madelyn Davis	November 29, 1971
Lucy tries to help David Frost sleep on a flight.
85	13	"Lucy in the Jungle"	Coby Ruskin	Larry Rhine and Lou Derman	December 6, 1971
Lucy, Harry, and Kim spend a vacation in the jungle.
86	14	"Lucy and Candid Camera"	Coby Ruskin	Milt Josefsberg and Al Schwartz	December 13, 1971
The Carters think they're on Candid Camera when they're led into a stint as musical bank robbers.
87	15	"Lucy's Lucky Day"	Coby Ruskin	Fred S. Fox and Seaman Jacobs	December 20, 1971
After a run of good luck, Lucy trains a chimp to win $1,000 on a game show.
88	16	"Lucy's Bonus Bounces"	Coby Ruskin	Martin A. Ragaway	December 27, 1971
Hilarity ensues when Harry gives Lucy a $50 raise.
89	17	"Lucy and the Little Old Lady"	Coby Ruskin	Fred S. Fox and Seaman Jacobs	January 3, 1972
Lucy suspects that a little old Irish lady is a con artist.
90	18	"Lucy and the Chinese Curse"	Coby Ruskin	Martin A. Ragaway	January 10, 1972
An ancient custom makes Lucy responsible for a Chinese laundryman after she saves his life.
91	19	"Lucy's Replacement"	Coby Ruskin	Fred S. Fox and Seaman Jacobs	January 17, 1972
Harry replaces Lucy with a computer.
92	20	"Kim Moves Out"	Coby Ruskin	Bob Carroll, Jr. and Madelyn Davis	January 24, 1972
Kim moves to a new place of residence, but Lucy is still doing all the cooking and cleaning.
93	21	"Lucy Sublets the Office"	Coby Ruskin	George Balzer and Sam Perrin	January 31, 1972
Lucy turns the office into a playpen thanks to a toymaker's gadgets. Guest stars Wally Cox, Richard Deacon.
94	22	"Lucy's Punctured Romance"	Coby Ruskin	Fred S. Fox and Seaman Jacobs	February 7, 1972
Kim attempts to discourage her mother's romance with an alleged playboy.
95	23	"With Viv As a Friend, Who Needs an Enemy?"	Coby Ruskin	Bob Carroll, Jr. and Madelyn Davis	February 14, 1972
Lucy is fired and replaced by Viv as Harry's secretary.
96	24	"Kim Finally Cuts You-Know-Whose Apron Strings"	Coby Ruskin	Bob Carroll, Jr. and Madelyn Davis	February 21, 1972
Kim moves into an apartment with wacky neighbors and lecherous men. This episode was a pilot for a proposed spin-off series.

=== Season 5 (1972–73) ===
No. overall	No. in season	Title	Directed by	Written by	Original release date
97	1	"Lucy's Big Break"	Coby Ruskin	Bob Carroll, Jr. and Madelyn Davis	September 11, 1972
Lucy falls for a doctor while she's in the hospital with a broken leg.
98	2	"Lucy and Eva Gabor Are Hospital Roomies"	Coby Ruskin	Bob Carroll, Jr. and Madelyn Davis	September 18, 1972
Eva Gabor becomes Lucy's hospital roommate.
99	3	"Harrison Carter, Male Nurse"	Coby Ruskin	Bob Carroll, Jr. and Madelyn Davis	September 25, 1972
Harry tends to Lucy when she comes home from the hospital.
100	4	"A Home Is Not an Office"	Coby Ruskin	Fred S. Fox and Seaman Jacobs	October 2, 1972
Harry moves the office to Lucy's house.
101	5	"Lucy and Joe Namath"	Coby Ruskin	Bob O'Brien	October 9, 1972
Joe Namath tries to convince Lucy to let Craig join a college-football team.
102	6	"The Case of the Reckless Wheel-Chair Driver"	Coby Ruskin	Fred S. Fox and Seaman Jacobs	October 16, 1972
Lucy is charged with reckless driving in a wheelchair.
103	7	"Lucy, the Other Woman"	Coby Ruskin	Fred S. Fox and Seaman Jacobs	October 23, 1972
Lucy finds herself the other woman in a romantic triangle.
104	8	"Lucy and Petula Clark"	Coby Ruskin	Bob O'Brien	October 30, 1972
Petula Clark hires Lucy as a secretary.
105	9	"Lucy and Jim Bailey"	Coby Ruskin	Bob O'Brien	November 6, 1972
When Phyllis Diller loses her voice at a benefit, Jim Bailey saves the show with his impression of her.
106	10	"Dirty Gertie"	Coby Ruskin	Bob O'Brien	November 13, 1972
Lucy goes undercover as an alcoholic apple peddler known as Dirty Gertie.
107	11	"Lucy and Donny Osmond"	Coby Ruskin	Bob O'Brien	November 20, 1972
Donny Osmond falls for Kim. Eve Plumb makes a guest appearance.
108	12	"Lucy and Her Prince Charming"	Coby Ruskin	Fred S. Fox and Seaman Jacobs	November 27, 1972
Harry helps a prince gain Lucy's hand in marriage.
109	13	"My Fair Buzzi"	Coby Ruskin	Fred S. Fox and Seaman Jacobs	December 4, 1972
Lucy gives Kim's friend Annie (Ruth Buzzi) a makeover for an audition.
110	14	"Lucy and the Group Encounter"	Coby Ruskin	Fred S. Fox and Seaman Jacobs	December 11, 1972
Lucy and Harry join an encounter group to let out their hostility toward each other.
111	15	"Lucy Is Really in a Pickle"	Coby Ruskin	Bob Carroll, Jr. and Madelyn Davis	January 1, 1973
Harry recruits Lucy and Kim to star in a TV commercial dressed as pickles.
112	16	"Lucy Goes on Her Last Blind Date"	Coby Ruskin	Bob Carroll, Jr. and Madelyn Davis	January 8, 1973
Lucy is set up on a blind date with Harry's rich country boy cousin Ben.
113	17	"Lucy and Her Genuine Twimby"	Coby Ruskin	Fred S. Fox and Seaman Jacobs	January 15, 1973
An antique dealer tries to get back a chair he sold to Lucy by mistake.
114	18	"Lucy Goes to Prison"	Coby Ruskin	Fred S. Fox and Seaman Jacobs	January 22, 1973
Lucy goes undercover as a convict to get information out of a bank robber.
115	19	"Lucy and the Professor"	Coby Ruskin	Bob O'Brien	January 29, 1973
Lucy thinks the young professor Kim is dating is an old man.
116	20	"Lucy and the Franchise Fiasco"	Coby Ruskin	Bob Carroll, Jr. and Madelyn Davis	February 5, 1973
Lucy gets a franchise serving soft ice cream.
117	21	"Lucy and Uncle Harry's Pot"	Coby Ruskin	Bob O'Brien	February 12, 1973
Lucy accidentally breaks a pot made for Harry by a previous secretary so she makes a new one.
118	22	"The Not So Popular Mechanic"	Coby Ruskin	Bob Carroll, Jr. and Madelyn Davis	February 19, 1973
Lucy tries to fix Harry's Rolls-Royce.
119	23	"Goodbye, Mrs. Hips"	Coby Ruskin	Bob Carroll, Jr. and Madelyn Davis	February 26, 1973
Lucy and her friends are tempted by a gourmet meal in the refrigerator as they try to maintain their diet.
120	24	"Lucy and Harry's Memoirs"	Coby Ruskin	Bob O'Brien	March 5, 1973
Lucy and Harry remember past misadventures as they pack up the office.

=== Season 6 (1973–74) ===
No. overall	No. in season	Title	Directed by	Written by	Original release date
121	1	"Lucy and Danny Thomas"	Coby Ruskin	Bob O'Brien	September 10, 1973
Lucy tries to help a painter (Danny Thomas) by arranging his fake death with the intention of selling his portraits.
122	2	"The Big Game"	Coby Ruskin	Bob O'Brien	September 17, 1973
O. J. Simpson gives Lucy and Harry 50-yard-line stadium tickets to a big football game.
123	3	"Lucy, the Peacemaker"	Coby Ruskin	Bob O'Brien	September 24, 1973
Lucy tries to make peace between Steve Lawrence and Eydie Gorme.
124	4	"Lucy the Wealthy Widow"	Coby Ruskin	Bob O'Brien	October 1, 1973
Lucy plays it rich in order to receive a loan from the bank (banker played by Ed McMahon).
125	5	"The Bow-Wow Boutique"	Coby Ruskin	Fred S. Fox and Seaman Jacobs	October 8, 1973
Lucy spends the weekend working at a pet shop.
126	6	"Lucy Gives Eddie Albert the Old Song and Dance"	Coby Ruskin	Bob Carroll, Jr. and Madelyn Davis	October 15, 1973
Eddie Albert mistakes Lucy for a stalker.
127	7	"Lucy's Tenant"	Coby Ruskin	Fred S. Fox and Seaman Jacobs	October 22, 1973
Lucy tries to kick out a particularly obnoxious tenant.
128	8	"Lucy and Andy Griffith"	Coby Ruskin	Bob O'Brien	October 29, 1973
Lucy befriends a charity worker (Andy Griffith) who solicits funds for a youth camp.
129	9	"Lucy and Joan Rivers Do Jury Duty"	Coby Ruskin	Bob Carroll, Jr. and Madelyn Davis	November 5, 1973
Lucy disagrees with other jurors on a case as she serves jury duty with Joan Rivers.
130	10	"Tipsy Through the Tulips"	Coby Ruskin	Bob Carroll, Jr. and Madelyn Davis	November 12, 1973
Lucy tries to keep an alcoholic writer sober long enough to finishhis latest novel.
131	11	"The Carters Meet Frankie Avalon"	Coby Ruskin	S : Fred S. Fox and Seaman Jacobs; S/T : Bob O'Brien	November 19, 1973
Frankie Avalon does impression for a talent show.
132	12	"Harry Catches Gold Fever"	Coby Ruskin	Fred S. Fox and Seaman Jacobs	December 3, 1973
Harry finds the perfect location to search for gold.
133	13	"Lucy and Chuck Connors Have a Surprise Slumber Party"	Coby Ruskin	Bob Carroll, Jr. and Madelyn Davis	December 17, 1973
Lucy finds Chuck Connors in bed after Harry rents her house to a production company shooting a movie.
134	14	"Lucy Plays Cops and Robbers"	Coby Ruskin	Bob Carroll, Jr. and Madelyn Davis	December 31, 1973
Lucy heads a neighborhood watch program created to tackle a string of robberies.
135	15	"Lucy Is a Bird Sitter"	Coby Ruskin	Bob Carroll, Jr. and Madelyn Davis	January 7, 1974
Lucy is entrusted to care for a valuable bird she subsequently loses.
136	16	"Meanwhile, Back at the Office"	Coby Ruskin	Bob Carroll, Jr. and Madelyn Davis	January 14, 1974
Lucy and Harry have no idea that they're working as bookies.
137	17	"Lucy Is N.G. as an R.N."	Coby Ruskin	Bob Carroll, Jr. and Madelyn Davis	January 21, 1974
Lucy becomes a nursemaid when Harry sprains his knee, Kim catches a cold and Mary Jane breaks her fingers.
138	18	"Lucy, the Sheriff"	Lucille Ball and Coby Ruskin	Fred S. Fox and Seaman Jacobs	January 28, 1974
Lucy serves as an honorary sheriff in a small Montana town where a bank robbery takes place during a re-enactment.
139	19	"Milton Berle Is the Life of the Party"	Jack Donohue	Madelyn Davis and Bob Carroll, Jr.	February 11, 1974
Lucy enlists Milton Berle as a guest for her party after winning a celebrity charity auction.
140	20	"Mary Jane's Boyfriend"	Jack Donohue	Fred S. Fox and Seaman Jacobs	February 18, 1974
Lucy gets into a romantic triangle with Mary Jane and her boyfriend.
141	21	"Lucy and Phil Harris Strikes Up the Band"	Jack Donohue	Bob O'Brien	February 25, 1974
Lucy and Phil Harris form an old-fashioned band.
142	22	"Lucy Carter Meets Lucille Ball"	Jack Donohue	Bob O'Brien	March 4, 1974
Lucy wins a Lucille Ball lookalike contest.
143	23	"Where Is My Wandering Mother Tonight?"	Jack Donohue	Bob Carroll, Jr. and Madelyn Davis	March 11, 1974
Lucy spends the weekend with Kim trying not to act like a mother.
144	24	"Lucy Fights the System"	Jack Donohue	Bob O'Brien	March 18, 1974
Lucy stands up for a waitress who was fired because of her age.

== See also ==
- List of The Lucy Show episodes
