= List of The Lucy Show episodes =

The following is a list of episodes of The Lucy Show, an American sitcom television series that ran on CBS from October 1, 1962, to March 11, 1968. The 30 half-hour season one episodes were all shot in black-and-white; all the remaining 126 half-hour episodes (from season two onwards) were shot in color.

== Series overview ==
Season	Episodes	Originally released		Rank	Rating	Households (millions)
Season	Episodes	First released	Last released	Rank	Rating	Households (millions)
1	30	October 1, 1962	April 29, 1963	4	29.8 (Note: Tied with Bonanza)	14.99
2	28	September 30, 1963	April 27, 1964	6	28.1	15.00
3	26	September 21, 1964	April 12, 1965	8	26.6	14.02
4	26	September 13, 1965	March 21, 1966	3	27.7	14.92
5	22	September 12, 1966	March 6, 1967	4	26.2	14.44
6	24	September 11, 1967	March 11, 1968	2	27.0	15.30

== Episodes ==
=== Season 1 (1962–63) ===
All episodes in black-and-white

No. overall	No. in season	Title	Directed by	Written by	Original release date
1	1	"Lucy Waits Up for Chris"	Jack Donohue	Bob Carroll, Jr., Madelyn Martin, Bob Weiskopf and Bob Schiller	October 1, 1962
Lucy promises her daughter Chris to not stay awake awaiting her from her date, but when the couple come home early and she is still not in bed, she hides, eventually becomes locked out of the house, and has to find a way to get upstairs from the outside.
2	2	"Lucy Digs Up a Date"	Jack Donohue	Bob Carroll, Jr., Madelyn Martin, Bob Weiskopf and Bob Schiller	October 8, 1962
Lucy tries to get a date with her son Jerry's new teacher, so she looks at his driver license—and doesn't put it back.
3	3	"Lucy Is a Referee"	Jack Donohue	Bob Carroll, Jr., Madelyn Martin, Bob Weiskopf and Bob Schiller	October 15, 1962
Lucy becomes a referee at a football game. After her incompetence gets both teams disqualified, she scrambles to make it up to them.
4	4	"Lucy Misplaces $2,000"	Jack Donohue	Bob Carroll, Jr., Madelyn Martin, Bob Weiskopf and Bob Schiller	October 22, 1962
After her banker, Mr. Barnsdahl, says his bank never makes a mistake and Lucy ends up with $2,000 after a mistake, she tries to keep it to play a joke, but the kids unknowingly take it to the park.
5	5	"Lucy Buys a Sheep"	Jack Donohue	Bob Carroll, Jr., Madelyn Martin, Bob Weiskopf and Bob Schiller	October 29, 1962
After Viv's son, Sherman, gives Lucy an idea, she buys a sheep to keep the lawn tidy, and has to keep it in the house when it starts snowing.
6	6	"Lucy Becomes an Astronaut"	Jack Donohue	Bob Carroll, Jr., Madelyn Martin, Bob Weiskopf and Bob Schiller	November 5, 1962
Lucy and Viv go into a space simulator for 24 hours and Lucy says she's ready for NASA to call her to go to space, so Viv plays a prank on her.
7	7	"Lucy Is a Kangaroo for a Day"	Jack Donohue	Bob Carroll, Jr., Madelyn Martin, Bob Weiskopf and Bob Schiller	November 12, 1962
Lucy takes a job as a secretary to afford Jerry a bicycle for his birthday, but when leaving the store where she bought the bicycle on her lunch hour, loose thread from her outfit becomes caught on an elevator, and she must don a kangaroo costume to complete her next errand of delivering documents to her employer at a restaurant.
8	8	"Lucy the Music Lover"	Jack Donohue	Bob Carroll, Jr., Madelyn Martin, Bob Weiskopf and Bob Schiller	November 19, 1962
Lucy becomes involved with a violinist who is interested in classical music and opera, and poses herself to be so too.
9	9	"Lucy Puts Up a TV Antenna"	Jack Donohue	Bob Carroll, Jr., Madelyn Martin, Bob Weiskopf and Bob Schiller	November 26, 1962
After a boring night without television because the antenna fell, Lucy tries to save money by installing the new antenna herself with Viv.
10	10	"Vivian Sues Lucy"	Jack Donohue	Bob Carroll, Jr., Madelyn Martin, Bob Weiskopf and Bob Schiller	December 3, 1962
Vivian falls and twists her ankle when the kids leave a mess in the house. Lucy is afraid she'll sue, so she tries to trick Viv into signing a paper that says she won't sue. When Viv finds out, Lucy must contend to her every need.
11	11	"Lucy Builds a Rumpus Room"	Jack Donohue	Bob Carroll, Jr., Madelyn Martin, Bob Weiskopf and Bob Schiller	December 10, 1962
Lucy and Viv decide to build a rumpus room after having conflicting dates at the house.
12	12	"Lucy and Her Electric Mattress"	Jack Donohue	Bob Carroll, Jr., Madelyn Martin, Bob Weiskopf and Bob Schiller	December 17, 1962
When Viv leaves to visit family, Lucy cleans Viv's room and purchases her a massaging mattress to help alleviate her back pain she recently complained of. However, when engaged, the mattress's vibration makes it slide across the freshly waxed floor. Lucy returns the mattress and will soon purchase a regular one, but Viv comes home early; and without a mattress, she, and Lucy, who is accompanying her, must sleep in Jerry and Sherman's bunk beds.
13	13	"Together for Christmas"	Jack Donohue	Bob Carroll, Jr., Madelyn Martin, Bob Weiskopf and Bob Schiller	December 24, 1962
Lucy and Viv decide to celebrate Christmas together. However, problems arise when they realize each other's traditions are different.
14	14	"Chris's New Year's Eve Party"	Jack Donohue	Bob Carroll, Jr., Madelyn Martin, Bob Weiskopf and Bob Schiller	December 31, 1962
Chris throws a New Year's Eve party and doesn't want Lucy and Viv there, but needs them to come to the rescue when the party becomes a flop.
15	15	"Lucy's Sister Pays a Visit"	Jack Donohue	Bob Carroll, Jr., Madelyn Martin, Bob Weiskopf and Bob Schiller	January 7, 1963
Lucy's sister has eloped, but Lucy wants her to have a formal ceremony right in the house. Things get tipsy when the nervous groom spikes the punch with champagne and the girls drink it.
16	16	"Lucy and Viv Are Volunteer Firemen"	Jack Donohue	Bob Carroll, Jr., Madelyn Martin, Bob Weiskopf and Bob Schiller	January 14, 1963
Lucy and Viv decide to become volunteer firemen.
17	17	"Lucy Becomes a Reporter"	Jack Donohue	Bob Carroll, Jr., Madelyn Martin, Bob Weiskopf and Bob Schiller	January 21, 1963
Lucy becomes a reporter, but is fired, and must have Viv get her job back by interviewing an old flame of Viv's, and important businessman.
18	18	"Lucy and Viv Put in a Shower"	Jack Donohue	Bob Carroll, Jr., Madelyn Martin, Bob Weiskopf and Bob Schiller	January 28, 1963
Tired of Chris hogging the bathroom every morning, Lucy and Viv decide to trick Harry & Eddie into building a shower in the boys' room. When the plumber Harry and Eddie secretly hired quits (after Lucy insults him), Lucy and Viv must finish the shower- but they accidentally get trapped in the shower while it's filling up with water.
19	19	"Lucy's Barbershop Quartet"	Jack Donohue	Bob Carroll, Jr., Madelyn Martin, Bob Weiskopf and Bob Schiller	February 4, 1963
Lucy tries to join Viv's quartet and hires a singing tutor to teach her how to sing.
20	20	"Lucy and Viv Become Tycoons"	Jack Donohue	Bob Carroll, Jr., Madelyn Martin, Bob Weiskopf and Bob Schiller	February 11, 1963
Lucy and Viv decide to market Viv's homemade caramel corn, but they break zoning laws.
21	21	"No More Double Dates"	Jack Donohue	Bob Carroll, Jr., Madelyn Martin, Bob Weiskopf and Bob Schiller	February 18, 1963
Viv and Lucy don't want to go on double dates anymore, but both of them secretly still want to.
22	22	"Lucy and Viv Learn Judo"	Jack Donohue	Bob Carroll, Jr., Madelyn Martin, Bob Weiskopf and Bob Schiller	February 25, 1963
To protect themselves better, Lucy and Viv take judo lessons, but problems arise when Jerry and Sherman start fighting.
23	23	"Lucy Is a Soda Jerk"	Jack Donohue	Bob Carroll, Jr., Madelyn Martin, Bob Weiskopf and Bob Schiller	March 4, 1963
Chris takes on a job of soda jerk to buy a uniform and Lucy takes over her shift during a parade.
24	24	"Lucy Drives a Dump Truck"	Jack Donohue	Bob Carroll, Jr., Madelyn Martin, Bob Weiskopf and Bob Schiller	March 11, 1963
Lucy foolishly collects 34 tons (68,000 lbs.) of paper, but must deliver it to the next town.
25	25	"Lucy Visits the White House"	Jack Donohue	Bob Carroll, Jr., Madelyn Martin, Bob Weiskopf and Bob Schiller	March 25, 1963
Lucy and her children's scout group build a sugar cube replica of the White House which they were going to present to President John F. Kennedy. However, the replica is crushed and Lucy scrambles at the various locations the train stops at to build another.
26	26	"Lucy and Viv Take Up Chemistry"	Jack Donohue	Bob Carroll, Jr., Madelyn Martin, Bob Weiskopf and Bob Schiller	April 1, 1963
To freshen up their skills, Lucy and Viv take chemistry classes at Night School, but Lucy tries to develop eternal youth and Viv decides to play a prank on her.
27	27	"Lucy Is a Chaperone"	Jack Donohue	Bob Carroll, Jr., Madelyn Martin, Bob Weiskopf and Bob Schiller	April 8, 1963
Lucy and Viv chaperone Chris's school trip, but Chris becomes embarrassed by them.
28	28	"Lucy and the Little League"	Jack Donohue	Bob Carroll, Jr., Madelyn Martin, Bob Weiskopf and Bob Schiller	April 15, 1963
Lucy coaches Jerry in little league, but is expelled from the game for mouthing off to the referee.
29	29	"Lucy and the Runaway Butterfly"	Jack Donohue	Bob Carroll, Jr., Madelyn Martin, Bob Weiskopf and Bob Schiller	April 22, 1963
Lucy lets go of Jerry's butterfly and tries to catch it.
30	30	"Lucy Buys a Boat"	Jack Donohue	Bob Carroll, Jr., Madelyn Martin, Bob Weiskopf and Bob Schiller	April 29, 1963
Lucy and Viv buy a boat and become stranded in the lake while riding it.

=== Season 2 (1963–64) ===
All episodes (Season 2 and onwards) in color

No. overall	No. in season	Title	Directed by	Written by	Original release date
31	1	"Lucy Plays Cleopatra"	Jack Donohue	Bob Carroll, Jr., Madelyn Martin, Bob Weiskopf and Bob Schiller	September 30, 1963
The Danfield volunteer firefighters put on a play of Cleopatra, but Lucy calls a firedrill and ditches and ends up getting the lead.
32	2	"Kiddie Parties Inc."	Jack Donohue	Bob Carroll, Jr., Madelyn Martin, Bob Weiskopf and Bob Schiller	October 7, 1963
Lucy and Viv go into business planning and entertaining at children's birthday parties.
33	3	"Lucy and Viv Play Softball"	Jack Donohue	Bob Carroll, Jr., Madelyn Martin, Bob Weiskopf and Bob Schiller	October 14, 1963
Lucy and Viv join a charity softball tournament.
34	4	"Lucy Gets Locked in the Vault"	Jack Donohue	Bob Carroll, Jr., Madelyn Martin and Bill O'Hallaren	October 21, 1963
Lucy tries to make a good impression on the new banker, Mr. Mooney, but gets them both locked in the bank's vault. Part one of two. Note: First appearance in the series of Gale Gordon as Mr. Mooney, Lucy's new banker.
35	5	"Lucy and the Safe Cracker"	Jack Donohue	Bob Carroll, Jr., Madelyn Martin and Bill O'Hallaren	October 28, 1963
Lucy accidentally locks Mr. Mooney in the bank's vault again and finds a reformed safecracker to unlock it. Part two of two.
36	6	"Lucy Goes Duck Hunting"	Jack Donohue	Bob Carroll, Jr., Madelyn Martin, Bob Weiskopf and Bob Schiller	November 4, 1963
Lucy lies to her boyfriend about being a skilled duck hunter and he takes her duck hunting.
37	7	"Lucy and the Bank Scandal"	Jack Donohue	Bob Carroll, Jr., Madelyn Martin, Bob Weiskopf and Bob Schiller	November 11, 1963
Lucy suspects Mr. Mooney of embezzling money from the bank.
38	8	"Lucy Decides to Redecorate"	Jack Donohue	Bob Carroll, Jr., Madelyn Martin, Bob Weiskopf and Bob Schiller	November 18, 1963
Lucy and Viv decide to redecorate the house.
39	9	"Lucy Puts Out a Fire at the Bank"	Jack Donohue	Bob Carroll, Jr., Madelyn Martin, Bob Weiskopf and Bob Schiller	December 2, 1963
Lucy starts a fire at the bank to demonstrate the skills of the Danfield volunteer firefighters.
40	10	"Lucy and the Military Academy"	Jack Donohue	Bob Carroll, Jr., Madelyn Martin, Iz Elinson and Fred S. Fox	December 9, 1963
Lucy sneaks into the military academy Jerry is enrolled at to see him.
41	11	"Lucy's College Reunion"	Jack Donohue	Bob Carroll, Jr., Madelyn Martin and Tom Koch	December 16, 1963
At their college reunion, Lucy and Viv revive an old tradition of temporarily stealing the statue of the school's founder.
42	12	"The Loophole in the Lease"	Jack Donohue	Bob Carroll, Jr., Madelyn Martin, Bob Weiskopf and Bob Schiller	December 23, 1963
Lucy wants Viv to pay for damage to her home Viv's son Sherman caused by leaving the water running, but Viv, who believes her lease guarantees that the lessor will pay for all damages to the house, checks it, and discovers a loophole that will allow her to take possession of Lucy's house upon the lease's approaching expiration.
43	13	"Lucy Conducts the Symphony"	Jack Donohue	Bob Carroll, Jr., Madelyn Martin, Bob Weiskopf and Bob Schiller	December 30, 1963
Lucy fills in for Viv's cousin Harold in a symphony concert when Lucy's attempts to calm his nerves with hypnotism work too well.
44	14	"Lucy Plays Florence Nightingale"	Jack Donohue	Bob Carroll, Jr., Madelyn Martin, Fred S. Fox and Iz Elinson	January 6, 1964
Lucy tries to get Mr. Mooney, who's in the hospital with a broken leg, to sign a check so she can buy Chris a dress for her first formal dance.
45	15	"Lucy Goes to Art Class"	Jack Donohue	Bob Carroll, Jr., Madelyn Martin, Bob Weiskopf and Bob Schiller	January 13, 1964
Lucy and Viv enroll in an art class when they fall for the same man in an art store.
46	16	"Chris Goes Steady"	Jack Donohue	Bob Carroll, Jr., Madelyn Martin, Iz Elinson and Fred S. Fox	January 20, 1964
Chris announces that she's going steady with Mr. Mooney's son Ted.
47	17	"Lucy Takes Up Golf"	Jack Donohue	Bob Carroll, Jr., Madelyn Martin, Fred S. Fox and Iz Elinson	January 27, 1964
Lucy's new boyfriend likes golf, so Lucy tries it herself.
48	18	"Lucy Teaches Ethel Merman to Sing"	Jack Donohue	Bob Carroll, Jr., Madelyn Martin, Bob Weiskopf and Bob Schiller	February 3, 1964
When Lucy makes a promise to have Ethel Merman sing at Jerry's Cub Scout charity show, she has no idea that the Broadway legend is living in Danfield under a different name. Part 1 of 2.
49	19	"Ethel Merman and the Boy Scout Show"	Jack Donohue	Bob Carroll, Jr., Madelyn Martin, Bob Weiskopf and Bob Schiller	February 10, 1964
Ethel Merman, under the name Agnes Schmidlapp, comes up with act for Lucy, Viv and Mr. Mooney to perform in the Cub Scout charity show. Part 2 of 2.
50	20	"Lucy and Viv Open a Restaurant"	Jack Donohue	Bob Carroll, Jr., Madelyn Martin, Bob Weiskopf and Bob Schiller	February 17, 1964
Lucy talks Viv into buying a restaurant with her life savings.
51	21	"Lucy Takes a Job at the Bank"	Jack Donohue	Bob Carroll, Jr. and Madelyn Martin	February 24, 1964
Lucy gets a job at the bank to buy Jerry a tuba.
52	22	"Viv Moves Out"	Jack Donohue	Bob Carroll, Jr., Madelyn Martin, Iz Elinson and Fred S. Fox	March 2, 1964
Viv moves out following an argument with Lucy.
53	23	"Lucy Is Her Own Lawyer"	Jack Donohue	Bob Carroll, Jr., Madelyn Martin and Howard Ostroff	March 9, 1964
Lucy takes Mr. Mooney to court to stop his dog's barking.
54	24	"Lucy Meets a Millionaire"	Jack Donohue	Bob Carroll, Jr., Madelyn Martin, Bob Weiskopf and Bob Schiller	March 16, 1964
Lucy meets an Italian millionaire who doesn't speak English.
55	25	"Lucy Goes Into Politics"	Jack Donohue	Bob Carroll, Jr., Madelyn Martin, Fred S. Fox and Iz Elinson	March 23, 1964
Lucy and Viv help Mr. Mooney campaign for the position of city comptroller.
56	26	"Lucy and the Scout Trip"	Jack Donohue	Bob Carroll, Jr., Madelyn Martin, Fred S. Fox, Iz Elinson and Howard Ostroff	March 30, 1964
Lucy, Viv and Mr. Mooney lead a scout trip in the woods.
57	27	"Lucy Is a Process Server"	Jack Donohue	Bob Carroll, Jr. and Madelyn Martin	April 20, 1964
Lucy is hired as a process server and Mr. Mooney is the first to get a subpoena from her.
58	28	"Lucy Enters a Baking Contest"	Jack Donohue	Bob Carroll, Jr. and Madelyn Martin	April 27, 1964
Lucy competes with Viv in a baking contest.

=== Season 3 (1964–65) ===
No. overall	No. in season	Title	Directed by	Written by	Original release date
59	1	"Lucy and the Good Skate"	Jack Donohue	Jerry Belson and Garry Marshall	September 21, 1964
After meeting a cute bachelor at a sporting goods store, Lucy buys a pair of skates too small for her feet. When her feet swell, she plans to keep a date by wearing the skates.
60	2	"Lucy and the Plumber"	Jack Donohue	Milt Josefsberg and Bob O'Brien	September 28, 1964
Lucy's plumber bears a striking resemblance to Jack Benny. She decides to enter him in a local talent contest.
61	3	"Lucy and the Winter Sports"	Jack Donohue	Ray Singer and Dick Chevillat	October 5, 1964
Lucy lies to her athletic boyfriend about being good at winter sports.
62	4	"Lucy Gets Amnesia"	Jack Donohue	Leonard Gershe	October 12, 1964
Lucy takes a blow to the head while trying to get her childhood sweetheart to reveal her pet name for him.
63	5	"Lucy and the Great Bank Robbery"	Jack Donohue	Bob Schiller and Bob Weiskopf	October 19, 1964
Lucy rents Viv's room to a pair of bank robbers.
64	6	"Lucy, the Camp Cook"	Jack Donohue	Bob Schiller and Bob Weiskopf	October 24, 1964
Lucy and Viv volunteer as cooks for their sons' camping trip.
65	7	"Lucy, the Meter Maid"	Jack Donohue	Bob O'Brien and Vic McLeod	November 2, 1964
Lucy becomes a meter maid and gives Viv the first parking ticket, which leads them both to court.
66	8	"Lucy Makes a Pinch"	Jack Donohue	Bob O'Brien and Vic McLeod	November 9, 1964
Lucy accompanies a detective on a stakeout to catch a lovers-lane bandit.
67	9	"Lucy Becomes a Father"	Jack Donohue	Fred S. Fox and Iz Elinson	November 16, 1964
Lucy joins Jerry on a father-and-son camping trip.
68	10	"Lucy's Contact Lenses"	Jack Donohue	Bob Schiller and Bob Weiskopf	November 23, 1964
Lucy loses a contact lens in a cake for the bank's bake sale.
69	11	"Lucy Gets Her Maid"	Jack Donohue	Bob O'Brien	November 30, 1964
Lucy works as a maid in order to afford one of her own. Guest starring Kathleen Freeman as Miss Putnam
70	12	"Lucy Gets the Bird"	Jack Donohue	Jerry Belson and Garry Marshall	December 7, 1964
Lucy and Viv take care of Mooney's beloved pet parakeet which they, of course, lose.
71	13	"Lucy, the Coin Collector"	Jack Donohue	David Braverman and Bob Marcus	December 14, 1964
Lucy and Viv start collecting coins when Jerry finds a penny worth 50 cents. When they finally find a valuable coin, they promptly drop it down the sewer.
72	14	"Lucy and the Missing Stamp"	Jack Donohue	Ray Singer and Dick Chevillat	December 21, 1964
Mooney's rare postage stamp goes missing while Lucy tries to sell him a vacuum cleaner.
73	15	"Lucy Meets Danny Kaye"	Jack Donohue	Bob Schiller and Bob Weiskopf	December 28, 1964
Lucy tries to get tickets to The Danny Kaye Show.
74	16	"Lucy and the Ceramic Cat"	Jack Donohue	Ray Singer and Dick Chevillat	January 11, 1965
Lucy accidentally breaks the ceramic cat Mooney bought for his wife's birthday.
75	17	"Lucy Goes to Vegas"	Jack Donohue	Bob O'Brien	January 18, 1965
Lucy and Viv win a trip to Las Vegas, but they're low on spending money.
76	18	"Lucy and the Monsters"	Jack Donohue	Story by : Maury Thompson and Art Thompson; Teleplay by : Garry Marshall and Jerry Belson	January 25, 1965
Lucy has nightmares after watching a monster movie.
77	19	"Lucy and the Countess"	Jack Donohue	Leonard Gershe	February 1, 1965
Lucy's old school friend is now a countess, but she's poor.
78	20	"My Fair Lucy"	Jack Donohue	Jerry Belson and Garry Marshall	February 8, 1965
Lucy and the Countess hatch a scheme to finance a charm school.
79	21	"Lucy and the Countess Lose Weight"	Jack Donohue	Iz Elinson and Fred S. Fox	February 15, 1965
Mooney enlists Lucy and the Countess to publicize a fat farm by taking its reducing course.
80	22	"Lucy and the Old Mansion"	Jack Donohue	Ray Singer and Dick Chevillat	March 1, 1965
The Countess moves to an old mansion to entertain foreign visitors.
81	23	"Lucy and Arthur Godfrey"	Jack Donohue	Fred S. Fox and Iz Elinson	March 8, 1965
Lucy and Viv persuade Arthur Godfrey to appear in a musical presented by the Danfield Community Players.
82	24	"Lucy and the Beauty Doctor"	Jack Donohue	Bob O'Brien	March 22, 1965
A hidden TV camera catches Lucy's visit to a beauty shop.
83	25	"Lucy the Stockholder"	Jack Donohue	Ray Singer and Dick Chevillat	March 29, 1965
Lucy spends her tax refund on stock in the bank.
84	26	"Lucy the Disc Jockey"	Jack Donohue	Garry Marshall and Jerry Belson	April 12, 1965
Lucy becomes a disc jockey after winning a local radio station's mystery-sound contest.

=== Season 4 (1965–66) ===
No. overall	No. in season	Title	Directed by	Written by	Original release date
85	1	"Lucy at Marineland"	Maury Thompson	Bob O'Brien	September 13, 1965
Lucy moves to Los Angeles. Hijinks ensue when she and Mr. Mooney, who has also moved, go to Marineland to see Jimmy Piersall. Note: This was the first episode to be televised in color.
86	2	"Lucy and the Golden Greek"	Maury Thompson	Garry Marshall and Jerry Belson	September 20, 1965
Lucy is set up on a blind date with a shy fellow who becomes a dancing Lothario thanks to the music playing in the Greek restaurant where they're dining.
87	3	"Lucy in the Music World"	Maury Thompson	Bob O'Brien	September 27, 1965
Lucy gets a job at a record company.
88	4	"Lucy and Joan"	Maury Thompson	Bob O'Brien, Iz Elinson and Fred S. Fox	October 11, 1965
Lucy and her neighbor Joan plan a surprise birthday party for a handsome neighbor.
89	5	"Lucy the Stunt Man"	Maury Thompson	Edmund Beloin and Henry Garson	October 18, 1965
Lucy substitutes for a stuntman in order to earn money for a new refrigerator.
90	6	"Lucy and the Countess Have a Horse Guest"	Maury Thompson	Garry Marshall and Jerry Belson	October 25, 1965
The Countess is left with a race horse in her late husband's will. Note: I Love Lucy star William Frawley makes a cameo appearance, believed to be his last onscreen appearance before his death in 1966, as a horse trainer.
91	7	"Lucy Helps Danny Thomas"	Maury Thompson	Bob O'Brien	November 1, 1965
Lucy takes a job as Mr. Mooney's secretary, and then creates chaos during rehearsals for a TV special starring Danny Thomas.
92	8	"Lucy Helps the Countess"	Maury Thompson	Edmund Beloin and Henry Garson	November 8, 1965
When the Countess gets a real-estate license, Lucy helps her sell a high-rise apartment to Mooney. Things take a turn when all three get locked in without a key.
93	9	"Lucy and the Sleeping Beauty"	Maury Thompson	Garry Marshall and Jerry Belson	November 15, 1965
Lucy falls for a construction superintendent (guest star Clint Walker) who uses karate whenever he's awakened.
94	10	"Lucy and the Undercover Agent"	Maury Thompson	Bob O'Brien	November 22, 1965
Lucy and the Countess think they see an enemy spy in a restaurant, but he's actually an undercover agent.
95	11	"Lucy and the Return of Iron Man"	Maury Thompson	Edmund Beloin and Henry Garson	November 29, 1965
Lucy reprises her role of "Iron Man Carmichael" to pay Mooney his winnings in a horserace.
96	12	"Lucy Saves Milton Berle"	Maury Thompson	Garry Marshall and Jerry Belson	December 6, 1965
Lucy is unaware that the drunk she's trying to rehabilitate is Milton Berle researching a movie role.
97	13	"Lucy the Choirmaster"	Maury Thompson	Bob O'Brien, Lila Garrett and Bernie Kahn	December 13, 1965
Lucy talks Mooney into letting the local boys' choir sing Christmas carols at the bank.
98	14	"Lucy Discovers Wayne Newton"	Maury Thompson	Bob O'Brien	December 27, 1965
Mooney's dog runs away under Lucy's care and ends up at Wayne Newton's farm. Lucy decides to get him an audition.
99	15	"Lucy the Rain Goddess"	Maury Thompson	Brad Radnitz and Bruce Howard	January 3, 1966
A tribe of Indians near Mooney's dude ranch believes Lucy is a rain goddess.
100	16	"Lucy and Art Linkletter"	Maury Thompson	Iz Elinson and Fred S. Fox	January 10, 1966
Art Linkletter offers Lucy $200 if she can be quiet for a whole day.
101	17	"Lucy Bags a Bargain"	Maury Thompson	Henry Taylor and Howard Ostroff	January 17, 1966
Lucy doesn't have the money for a bargain she bagged at a department store, so she takes a job there to earn it.
102	18	"Lucy Meets Mickey Rooney"	Maury Thompson	Hugh Wedlock, Jr. and Allan Manings	January 24, 1966
Mickey Rooney requests a bank loan to finance his acting school.
103	19	"Lucy and the Soap Opera"	Maury Thompson	Edmund Beloin and Henry Garson	January 31, 1966
Lucy attempts to save her actor-neighbor from being written off her favorite soap opera.
104	20	"Lucy Goes to a Hollywood Premiere"	Maury Thompson	Edmund Beloin and Henry Garson	February 7, 1966
Lucy fills in as a theater usher in order to attend a Hollywood premiere.
105	21	"Lucy Dates Dean Martin"	Maury Thompson	Bob O'Brien	February 14, 1966
Dean Martin's double invites Lucy to a celebrity ball.
106	22	"Lucy and Bob Crane"	Maury Thompson	Edmund Beloin and Henry Garson	February 21, 1966
Bob Crane asks Lucy on a date, but has no idea that she's performing stunts in his movie as Iron Man Carmichael.
107	23	"Lucy the Robot"	Maury Thompson	Garry Marshall and Jerry Belson	February 28, 1966
Lucy takes the place of robot built to entertain Mooney's troublesome nephew (Jay North) that she accidentally breaks.
108	24	"Lucy and Clint Walker"	Maury Thompson	Garry Marshall and Jerry Belson	March 7, 1966
Lucy measures her burly friend (Clint Walker) to knit him a sweater, but tries to get rid of it when she sees how big it is and how much he hates the color red.
109	25	"Lucy the Gun Moll"	Maury Thompson	Bob O'Brien	March 14, 1966
An FBI agent asks Lucy to pose as a gangster's girlfriend, who just so happens to look exactly like Lucy.
110	26	"Lucy, the Superwoman"	Maury Thompson	Elroy Schwartz	March 21, 1966
After lifting a heavy machine off of Mr. Mooney's foot, Lucy's adrenal glands malfunction, giving her superstrength.

=== Season 5 (1966–67) ===
No. overall	No. in season	Title	Directed by	Written by	Original release date
111	1	"Lucy with George Burns"	Maury Thompson	Bob O'Brien	September 12, 1966
George Burns makes Lucy a part of his new nightclub act.
112	2	"Lucy and the Submarine"	Maury Thompson	Richard Bensfield and Perry Grant	September 19, 1966
Lucy gets stuck on a submarine with Mr. Mooney.
113	3	"Lucy the Bean Queen"	Maury Thompson	Phil Leslie	September 26, 1966
An upstart bean salesman (Ed Begley, Sr.) falls prey to his own "double your money back" guarantee when Lucy decides to exploit it for a get-rich-quick scheme.
114	4	"Lucy and Paul Winchell"	Maury Thompson	Milt Josefsberg and Ray Singer	October 3, 1966
Lucy gets Paul Winchell to perform at the bank's annual dinner. When she goofs and misplaced his dummies, she takes their place.
115	5	"Lucy and the Ring-a-Ding Ring"	Maury Thompson	Milt Josefsberg and Ray Singer	October 10, 1966
Lucy tries on a ring Mooney made for his wife, but it gets stuck.
116	6	"Lucy Flies to London"	Maury Thompson	Bob O'Brien; Special Material by: Madelyn Davis and Bob Carroll, Jr.	October 17, 1966
Lucy wins a trip to London in a dog food jingle contest. When she misses her initial flight, she takes a connecting flight, which Mr. Mooney happens to be on.
117	7	"Lucy Gets a Roommate"	Maury Thompson	Bob O'Brien and Elroy Schwartz	October 31, 1966
Lucy becomes roommates with a librarian. Guest starring Carol Burnett (who does her famous Tarzan yell a year before her own show begins). Part 1 of 2.
118	8	"Lucy and Carol in Palm Springs"	Maury Thompson	Bob O'Brien and Elroy Schwartz	November 7, 1966
Lucy joins Carol's musical act in Palm Springs. Part 2 of 2.
119	9	"Lucy Gets Caught Up in the Draft"	Maury Thompson	Milt Josefsberg and Ray Singer	November 14, 1966
Lucy receives a draft notice in the mail by mistake and ends up joining the USMC. Cameo by Jim Nabors as Gomer Pyle.
120	10	"Lucy and John Wayne"	Maury Thompson	Bob O'Brien	November 21, 1966
Lucy causes trouble for John Wayne on the set of his new movie. Guest Stars: Joseph Ruskin as the director, Morgan Woodward as Pierce and Bryan O'Byrne as the assistant director.
121	11	"Lucy and Pat Collins"	Maury Thompson	Milt Josefsberg and Ray Singer	November 28, 1966
Lucy and Mooney appear in Pat Collins' hypnotist act.
122	12	"Lucy and the Monkey"	Maury Thompson	Sam Locke and Joe Rapp	December 5, 1966
A stressed out Lucy thinks Mooney has turned into a monkey.
123	13	"Lucy and Phil Silvers"	Maury Thompson	Milt Josefsberg and Ray Singer	December 12, 1966
An efficiency expert (Phil Silvers) makes the bank inefficient.
124	14	"Lucy's Substitute Secretary"	Maury Thompson	Story by : Vic McLeod and Bob O'Brien; Teleplay by : Bob O'Brien	January 2, 1967
Lucy spies on her substitute in various disguises.
125	15	"Viv Visits Lucy"	Maury Thompson	Bob O'Brien	January 9, 1967
Viv returns to California and enlists Lucy to help her find a young college student from her hometown.
126	16	"Lucy the Babysitter"	Maury Thompson	Ray Singer and Milt Josefsberg	January 16, 1967
Lucy babysits the Marquis Chimps to prove she can handle any job.
127	17	"Main Street U.S.A."	Maury Thompson	Bob O'Brien	January 23, 1967
Lucy joins a protest against a proposed freeway on Main Street. Part 1 of 2.
128	18	"Lucy Puts Main Street on the Map"	Maury Thompson	Bob O'Brien	January 30, 1967
Lucy rallies others to stop freeways from being built in small towns. Part 2 of 2.
129	19	"Lucy Meets the Law"	Maury Thompson	Alan J. Levitt	February 13, 1967
Lucy is mistaken for a notorious red-headed shoplifter. Guest Stars: Claude Akins as Lt. Finch, Iris Adrian as Hard Head Hogan, Ken Lynch as officer Peters, Joseph V. Perry as officer Miller, Byron Foulger as Mr. Trindle and Jody Gilbert as the matron.
130	20	"Lucy the Fight Manager"	Maury Thompson	Ronald Axe and Les Roberts	February 20, 1967
Lucy helps a retired boxer earn enough money to purchase a flower shop. Guest Stars: Don Rickles as Eddie Rickles, Cliff Norton as Ike, Lewis Charles as Nick, Stanley Adams as Louie, and Bruce Mars as Sonny.
131	21	"Lucy and Tennessee Ernie Ford"	Maury Thompson	Bob O'Brien	February 27, 1967
The bank hopes that a rich country-music star will make a deposit if he arrives at their hoedown.
132	22	"Lucy Meets Sheldon Leonard"	Maury Thompson	Milt Josefsberg and Ray Singer	March 6, 1967
Mooney gives Sheldon Leonard permission to shoot a hold-up scene in the bank, but Lucy and Mary Jane think it's for real.

=== Season 6 (1967–68) ===
No. overall	No. in season	Title	Directed by	Written by	Original release date
133	1	"Lucy Meets the Berles"	Maury Thompson	Bob O'Brien	September 11, 1967
Lucy takes a part-time job as Milton Berle's secretary. When she mistakes a script reading for the real thing, she believes he is cheating on his wife.
134	2	"Lucy Gets Trapped"	Jack Donohue	Milt Josefsberg and Ray Singer	September 18, 1967
Lucy fakes illness to go shopping, but when she becomes the ten-millionth customer at the department store, she tries to prevent Mooney from seeing her picture in the paper.
135	3	"Lucy and the French Movie Star"	Jack Donohue	Bob O'Brien	September 25, 1967
Lucy gets drunk on a French movie star's champagne. Guest starring Jacques Bergerac.
136	4	"Lucy and the Starmaker"	Jack Donohue	Fred S. Fox and Seaman Jacobs	October 2, 1967
When the bank owner's nephew starts working at the bank, Lucy discovers his talent for singing and stages an audition for him at the bank. Guest starring Frankie Avalon
137	5	"Lucy Gets Her Diploma"	Jack Donohue	Ray Singer and Milt Josefsberg	October 9, 1967
When the bank institutes a new policy, Lucy goes back to high school to get her diploma to keep her job.
138	6	"Lucy Gets Jack Benny's Account"	Jack Donohue	Milt Josefsberg and Ray Singer	October 16, 1967
Lucy tries to talk Jack Benny into putting his fortune in the bank. She wins him over by getting the bank to install the most elaborate security system he's ever seen.
139	7	"Little Old Lucy"	Jack Donohue	Milt Josefsberg and Ray Singer	October 23, 1967
Mooney has Lucy dress up as an old woman to take an elderly banker Cornelius Heatherington Jr. (Dennis Day) to a banquet.
140	8	"Lucy and Robert Goulet"	Jack Donohue	Douglas Morrow	October 30, 1967
Lucy convinces a truck driver to enter a Robert Goulet look-alike contest to earn some money.
141	9	"Lucy Gets Mooney Fired"	Jack Donohue	Fred S. Fox and Seaman Jacobs	November 6, 1967
Mooney gets fired for Lucy's good intentions. To help him get his job back, she makes his replacement think he's going crazy.
142	10	"Lucy's Mystery Guest"	Jack Donohue	Milt Josefsberg and Ray Singer	November 13, 1967
Lucy accidentally tears up a letter from a mystery guest who turns out to be her aunt Agatha.
143	11	"Lucy, the Philanthropist"	Jack Donohue	Fred S. Fox and Seaman Jacobs	November 20, 1967
Mooney thinks the hobo Lucy took in is a philanthropist in disguise.
144	12	"Lucy Sues Mooney"	Jack Donohue	Ray Singer and Milt Josefsberg	November 27, 1967
A lawyer talks Lucy into suing Mooney after she hurts her leg working at Mooney's house.
145	13	"Lucy and Carol Burnett: Part 1"	Jack Donohue	Bob O'Brien	December 4, 1967
Lucy and Carol train to become stewardesses.
146	14	"Lucy and Carol Burnett: Part 2"	Jack Donohue	Bob O'Brien	December 11, 1967
After earning their wings as stewardesses, Lucy and Carol do a musical saluting aviation.
147	15	"Lucy and Viv Reminisce"	Jack Donohue	Milt Josefsberg; Based on an Idea by: Hilda Josefsberg	January 1, 1968
Lucy and Viv remember their past misadventures.
148	16	"Lucy and the Pool Hustler"	Jack Donohue	Bob O'Brien, Sam Locke and Joe Rapp	January 8, 1968
A pool hustler (Dick Shawn) wears a disguise and takes on Lucy in a woman's tournament.
149	17	"Lucy Gets Involved"	Jack Donohue	Story by : Ernest D. Glucksman and Martin Grupsmith; Teleplay by : Milt Josefsberg and Ray Singer	January 15, 1968
Lucy moonlights as a waitress at a drive-in restaurant to replace Mooney's broken TV and finds herself involved with a young motorcyclist accused of stealing and stripping cars.
150	18	"Mooney's Other Wife"	Jack Donohue	Bob O'Brien	January 22, 1968
Lucy poses as Mooney's wife to save him from an infatuated woman.
151	19	"Lucy and the Stolen Stole"	Jack Donohue	Milt Josefsberg and Ray Singer	January 29, 1968
Lucy and Mooney are put in jail for possessing a stolen fur coat. Guest starring Buddy Hackett
152	20	"Lucy and Phil Harris"	Jack Donohue	Bob O'Brien	February 5, 1968
Lucy helps Phil Harris make a comeback.
153	21	"Lucy Helps Ken Berry"	Jack Donohue	Bob O'Brien	February 19, 1968
Lucy tries to help Ken Berry save his dancing school from bankruptcy.
154	22	"Lucy and the Lost Star"	Jack Donohue	Ray Singer and Milt Josefsberg	February 26, 1968
Lucy and Viv think Joan Crawford is down and out, so they get her cast in a comedy film set in the 1920s.
155	23	"Lucy and Sid Caesar"	Jack Donohue	Bob O'Brien	March 4, 1968
Lucy sets out to capture a crook who looks just like Sid Caesar.
156	24	"Lucy and the 'Boss of the Year' Award"	Jack Donohue	Bob O'Brien	March 11, 1968
Lucy enters Mooney in a "Boss of the Year" contest.

== See also ==
- List of Here's Lucy episodes
