= Here's Lucy =

American sitcom (1968–1974)

- Created by: Bob O'Brien; Milt Josefsberg
- Starring: Lucille Ball; Gale Gordon; Lucie Arnaz; Desi Arnaz Jr.; Mary Jane Croft
- Theme music composer: Wilbur Hatch
- Composers: Wilbur Hatch (1968–1969); Marl Young (1969–1974)
- Country of origin: United States
- No. of seasons: 6
- No. of episodes: 144 (list of episodes)

Production
- Executive producer: Gary Morton
- Producers: Tommy Thompson; Cleo Smith
- Running time: 25 minutes
- Production companies: Lucille Ball Productions; Paramount Television

Original release
- Network: CBS
- Release: September 23, 1968 – March 18, 1974

Related
- The Lucy Show; Life with Lucy

Here's Lucy is an American sitcom starring Lucille Ball. The series co-starred her long-time comedy partner Gale Gordon and Ball's real-life children Lucie Arnaz and Desi Arnaz Jr. It was broadcast on CBS from 1968 to 1974. It was Ball's third network sitcom, following I Love Lucy (1951–57) and The Lucy Show (1962–68).

== Production ==
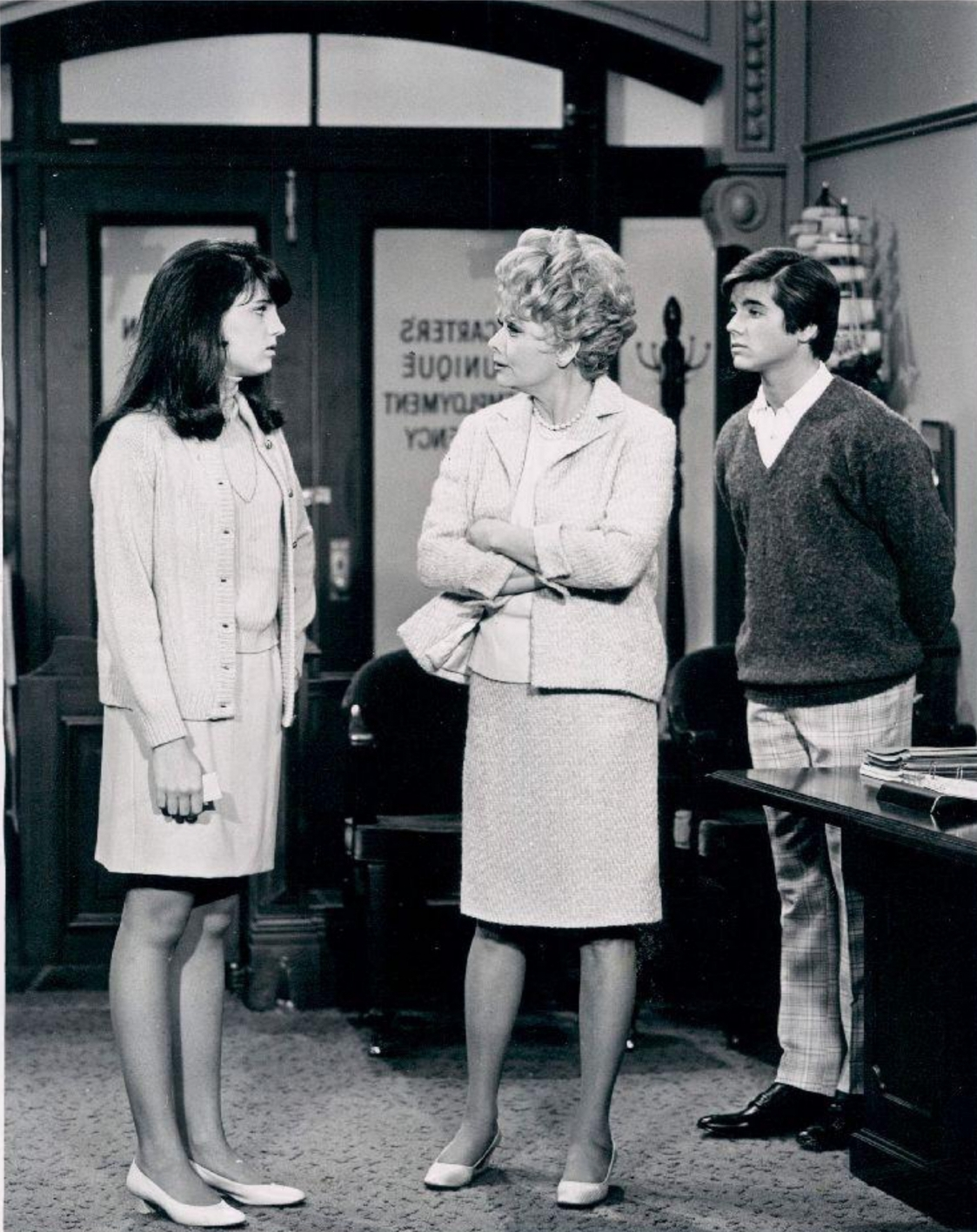
Lucy and her children at Carter's Unique Employment Agency

During the sixth season of The Lucy Show, Ball sold Desilu Productions to Gulf+Western. Although it finished as the second-most watched program of the 1967–68 season, Ball opted to end the series. Not only did she feel there were enough episodes for syndicated reruns, but she no longer wished to star in a series she no longer owned. She decided to develop a new series on the condition that her two children co-star with her and Gordon. In April 1968, Ball and CBS announced that a new series starring Ball and the Arnaz children was in development under Lucy Show producer Milt Josefsberg.

The series was created by Milt Josefsberg and Bob O'Brien. Their goal was to have Ball escape the types of shows for which she had previously been so well known. The writers interviewed Lucie and Desi Jr. to allow a more realistic approach to how teenagers acted. In addition, they were given free rein to choose the names for their respective characters. The name of Ball's character, Lucy Hinkley Carter, like Lucy Carmichael on The Lucy Show, again contains "ar" in tribute to her ex-husband Desi Arnaz.

Doris Singleton, who played Carolyn Appleby on I Love Lucy, has said she was originally going to be a series regular on the show as Harry Carter's secretary, but the idea was dropped when Lucy brought her children on board with the show. Here's Lucy was produced by Ball's newly created production company, Lucille Ball Productions. Desilu's successor Paramount Television co-produced the first season, but sold its stake in the show to Ball afterwards.

Mary Jane Croft, who had been a regular featured player on the last three seasons of The Lucy Show, also became a semi-regular on the new series. Character actress Vanda Barra, who had played small parts on The Lucy Show, was also added to this sitcom and gradually was upgraded. Towards the end of the run of Here's Lucy, Barra became part of the ensemble cast. Ball's longtime costar Vivian Vance also made six guest appearances as Vivian Jones through the series' run.

Unlike most sitcoms of the era, Here's Lucy was filmed before a live audience; standard practice at the time was to film an episode on a closed set and add a laugh track during post-production. However, a laugh track was still used to fill any gaps in audience reactions or missed punchlines. The live format was requested by Ball herself, as she believed that she performed better in the presence of an audience.

The title sequence animation was by Jim Danforth.

== Premise ==
The show's premise sees widow Lucy Hinkley Carter (Ball) raising her two children, Kim (Lucie Arnaz) and Craig (Desi Arnaz Jr.) while working for her brother-in-law Harry Carter (Gale Gordon) at his business, Carter's Unique Employment Agency.

The show focuses on the "generation gap" struggle between a working mother and her two increasingly independent teenagers. Storylines touch upon then-current events such as civil rights, rock music and the sexual revolution.

== Cast ==
Actor	Character	Season 1	Season 2	Season 3	Season 4	Season 5	Season 6
Actor	Character	1968–69	1969–70	1970–71	1971–72	1972–73	1973–74
Lucille Ball	Lucy Hinkley Carter	Starring	Starring	Starring	Starring	Starring	Starring
Gale Gordon	Harrison Otis "Harry" Carter	Starring	Starring	Starring	Starring	Starring	Starring
Lucie Arnaz	Kim Carter	Starring	Starring	Starring	Starring	Starring	Starring
Desi Arnaz Jr.	Craig Carter	Starring	Starring	Starring	N/A	Guest	N/A
Mary Jane Croft	Mary Jane Lewis	Recurring	Regular	Regular	Regular	Regular	Regular

== Episodes ==
Season	Episodes	Originally released		Rank	Rating	Households (millions)
Season	Episodes	First released	Last released	Rank	Rating	Households (millions)
1	24	September 23, 1968	March 17, 1969	9	23.8	13.86
2	24	September 22, 1969	March 2, 1970	6	23.9	13.98
3	24	September 14, 1970	February 22, 1971	3	26.1	15.69
4	24	September 13, 1971	February 21, 1972	10	23.7 (Note: Tied with The Mary Tyler Moore Show.)	14.72
5	24	September 11, 1972	March 5, 1973	15	21.9	14.19
6	24	September 10, 1973	March 18, 1974	29	20.0	13.24

== Guest stars and notable episodes ==
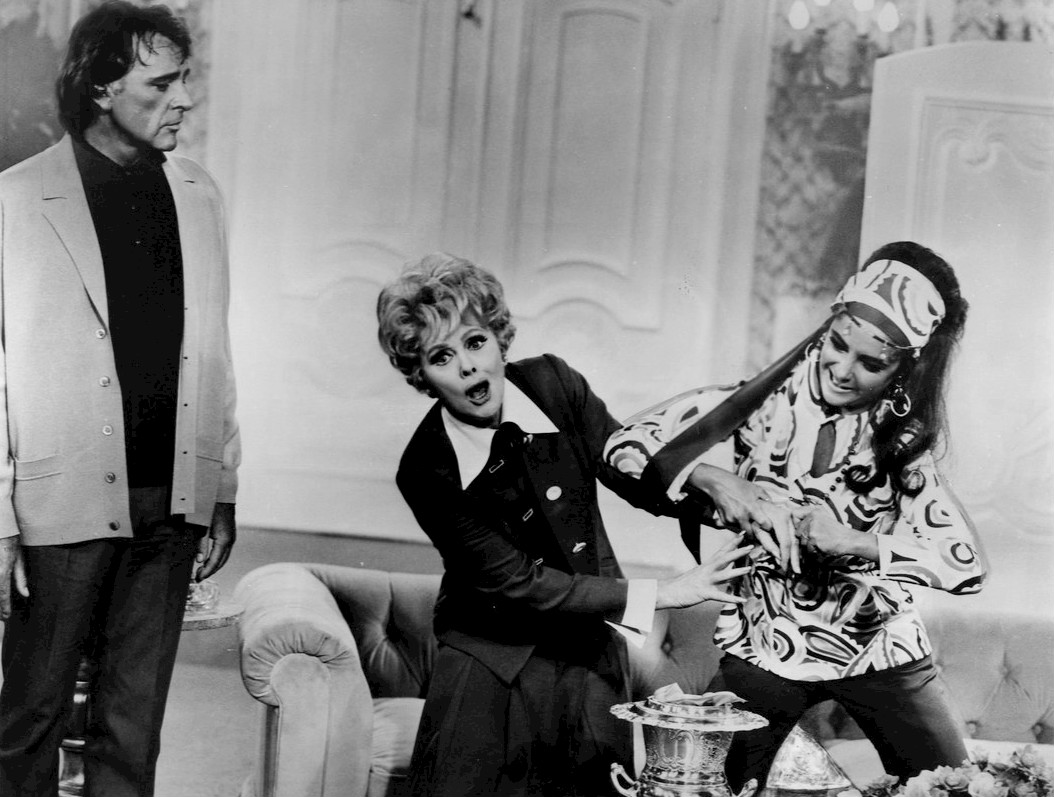
Elizabeth Taylor tries to get her diamond back from Lucy's finger as Richard Burton looks on, 1970

Richard Burton and Elizabeth Taylor guest-star in the 1970 third season opener, in a storyline involving their famous diamond, which becomes stuck on Lucy's finger. Ball and Burton reportedly did not get along, as he found Ball's rigid perfectionism grating; he subsequently wrote about her in extremely unflattering terms in his memoir. (The episode reunited Ball with longtime cowriters Madelyn Pugh Davis and Bob Carroll Jr. for the first time since both writers had left The Lucy Show in 1964.) Another noteworthy episode is "Lucy Visits Jack Benny." In addition to Benny, Jackie Gleason made a surprise cameo reprising his role of bus driver Ralph Kramden.

During its run, Here's Lucy featured a number of famous guest stars, many of whom were Ball's real-life friends, often playing themselves, including (in alphabetical order) Patty Andrews, Jack Benny, Milton Berle, Carol Burnett, George Burns, Ruth Buzzi, Johnny Carson, Petula Clark, John Davidson, Eva Gabor, Helen Hayes, Liberace, Dean Martin, Ann-Margret, Eve McVeagh, Donny Osmond, Vincent Price, Tony Randall, Buddy Rich, Joan Rivers, Ginger Rogers, Dinah Shore, Danny Thomas, Vivian Vance, Lawrence Welk, Flip Wilson, and Shelley Winters.

Ball appeared as herself in an episode in which Lucy Carter enters a Lucille Ball look-alike contest. This episode, designed to cross-promote Ball's then-current film Mame, enabled Ball to appear on screen with herself.

Mary Treen was cast as Mary Winters in the series finale, the 1974 episode "Lucy Fights the System".

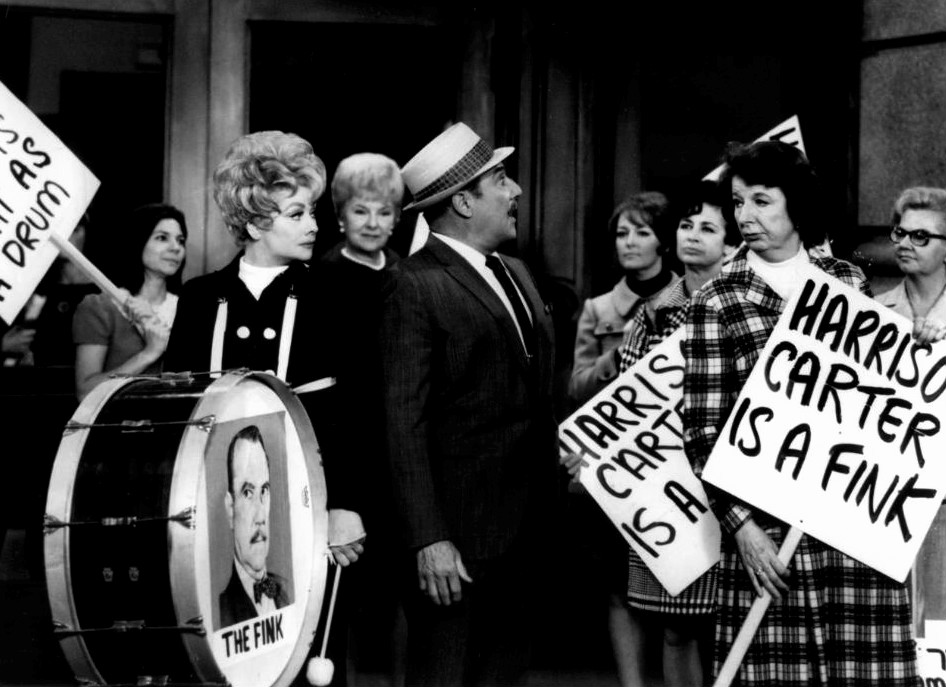
Lucy organizes a strike against her boss, Mr. Carter.

=== Proposed spin-off ===
At the end of the third season, Desi Arnaz, Jr. decided to leave the series to pursue a movie acting career. His character of Craig returned in the fifth-season episode "Lucy and Joe Namath', but after that he never again appeared on the show, although Craig was referred to from time to time. With Desi Jr.'s absence, Lucie Arnaz's character of Kim became more a prominent part of the program as well as a strong comedic foil for both Ball and Gordon.

During the fourth season, the producers proposed a spin-off of the show for Kim, titled The Lucie Arnaz Show. The show would have Kim and her friend Sue (Susan Tolsky) live in their own apartment in a building run by Lucy's brother, Herb Hinkley (Alan Oppenheimer), who is very over protective of Kim.

A backdoor pilot episode, "Kim Finally Cuts You-Know-Whose Apron Strings", was written by Lucy veteran writers Madelyn Davis & Bob Carroll, Jr., airing as the season four finale. The pilot was anticipated to be picked up as a weekly series.

The week before this installment aired, Vivian Vance made her annual (and final) appearance on Here's Lucy in the episode "With Viv as a Friend, Who Needs an Enemy?" Vance had moved back to California by this time and Ball was so thrilled to work with her again that she asked Vance to rejoin her as her comrade on Here's Lucy the following season if her daughter's pilot sold to CBS. However, Arnaz's show was not well received and was not included in the 1972–73 fall lineup. In addition, shortly after finishing the episode with Ball, Vance was diagnosed with breast cancer and then suffered a slight stroke. Lucie Arnaz remained with Here's Lucy until the show ended in the spring of 1974.

Lucie Arnaz eventually did star in her own self-named show The Lucie Arnaz Show in 1985, but that was unrelated to the premise of the proposed Here's Lucy spin-off.

== Final seasons ==
In 1972, shortly before filming of the fifth season began, Ball broke her right leg in a skiing accident. As a result, the fifth season saw a season-long storyline where in the character of Lucy Carter also had a broken leg. Both Ball and Lucy Carter spent much of the season in a wheelchair and full-leg cast. According to Geoffrey Mark Fidelman, author of The Lucy Book, this was the point where the "Lucy" character was "finally allowed to age."

Ball's injury and recovery severely limited her ability to perform physical comedy during the season. This gave the other members of the cast, such as Lucie Arnaz and featured players Mary Jane Croft and Vanda Barra, a chance to shine. It also gave Gale Gordon's character of Harry a chance to be more sympathetic and affectionate toward Lucy, which had been completely missing since Gordon first joined the cast of The Lucy Show nine years earlier. A thaw in the relationship between Lucy and Harry accelerated, so that they could interact more as friendly in-laws rather than just as antagonistic co-workers.

Despite Ball's injury, physical comedy was never eliminated. During the recovery, there were small gags that Ball could safely perform with little to no general injury or harm to her leg. As her recovery progressed, Ball was able to take on more physical comedy routines. However, the slapstick aspects were still toned down for the remainder of the series in comparison to earlier seasons.

By the spring of 1973, Here's Lucy had fallen to #15 in the ratings ─ the first time that a series starring Lucille Ball had fallen out of the top ten. Unsure of whether she wanted to continue, Ball and Gale Gordon filmed a season finale without a studio audience present. In that installment, Harry's business was sold and he and Lucy reminisced together (using flashbacks) about their various adventures together. At the end of the episode, they both leave the office. Lucy then leaves a sign that says "closed temporarily", then she looks at the camera and winks. At the last minute, CBS president Fred Silverman convinced Ball to return for a sixth season.

On February 27, 1974, The New York Times reported that Ball had officially told CBS she would not continue the series. Lucie Arnaz chose to leave the series after being cast in the national tour of Seesaw, while Ball was launching a film comeback with Mame. Without either of her children, and with enough episodes for syndication, Ball made the decision to end the series. CBS was also in the process of reinventing its image, having already replaced much of their "old guard" television product with more contemporary fare such as The Mary Tyler Moore Show, All in the Family, The Bob Newhart Show, and M*A*S*H. Except for Gunsmoke, which would remain for one more season, Ball was the last performer from TV's classic age who still had a weekly series at the beginning of 1974. Between 1974 and 1978, still under contract, Ball would star in seven television specials for CBS.

== Syndication and rights issues ==
Here's Lucy was not initially offered in syndication when the series ended in 1974 because both I Love Lucy, which was being distributed by Viacom at the time, and The Lucy Show, which was being distributed by Paramount, were still popular in reruns and it was felt that introducing another Lucy series might undermine the success the other two shows were enjoying. This would also have put Ball in the position of competing against her former series and former production company for ratings, since she no longer had control of either I Love Lucy or The Lucy Show after selling Desilu Productions to Paramount's parent company Gulf + Western.

The show was originally offered internationally, first by Paramount Television, then by John Pearson International, a company formed by ex-Desilu/Paramount employee John Pearson, who controls foreign sales of the series.

CBS retained the rights to run the show in daytime. CBS Daytime reran the series weekday mornings from May 2 to November 4, 1977, in the same time-slot that they had previously rerun The Lucy Show from 1968 to 1972, and before that (1959–67) had at various times rerun I Love Lucy. Finally, in the fall of 1981, Here's Lucy was put into broadcast syndication first by Telepictures, who had acquired the rights to the series in 1980, and in turn the rights were later transferred to Warner Bros. Television Distribution (which acquired Telepictures' successor, Lorimar-Telepictures). Here's Lucy was not successful in syndication and was withdrawn in 1985.

Largely forgotten in the late 1980s and early 1990s and rarely carried by the cable networks, reruns of the series were returned to air by Pax TV in 1998. Cozi TV began airing the show on August 11, 2014. As of December 29, 2025, Catchy Comedy began airing it. The show's current distributor is Paul Brownstein Productions.

The program was shown in Britain by the BBC fairly soon after it was made, in the Saturday tea-time (mid-afternoon) slot, but it has not been shown often since.

It was seen in Australia on the GO! channel from 31 May 2010 until November 2010. For many years prior to that on Australian television, the show was distributed by Pacific Telecasters Pty. Ltd before being later transferred to Warner Bros. Television. It was a perennial favourite seen on the Nine Network from 1968 to 1988 and in 1992 on ABC Television. Prior to GO!, the show screened on Ovation.

As of 2018, the show is available on Amazon Prime Video in Canada and the USA. As of 2019, it is also available on Pluto in the United States, and Tubi.

== Home media ==
On August 17, 2004, Shout! Factory and Sony Music Entertainment released Here's Lucy: Best Loved Episodes from the Hit Television Series. The four-disc set features 24 original episodes from the series presented uncut and digitally remastered from original color negatives for superior quality, as well as several bonus features.

On March 25, 2014, MPI Home Video—under license from the copyright holders, "Desilu, Too", and Lucille Ball Productions, Inc.—released Here's Lucy: The Complete Series on DVD in Region 1.

In Region 4, Madman Entertainment has released all six seasons on DVD in Australia.

=== Other releases ===
In September 2018, Time Life released a DVD, Lucy: The Ultimate Collection, that contains 14 episodes of Here's Lucy, and which also collected 32 episodes of I Love Lucy, as well as 24 episodes of The Lucy Show, and 4 episodes of the short-lived ABC-TV series Life with Lucy (which had at the time never before been released to home media), plus a wide variety of bonus features.

DVD Name	Ep #	Release dates	
DVD Name	Ep #	Region 1	Region 4
Season One	24	August 25, 2009	October 6, 2009
Season Two	24	November 3, 2009	March 15, 2010
Season Three	24	June 15, 2010	September 15, 2010
Season Four	24	March 29, 2011	April 20, 2011
Season Five	24	February 28, 2012	May 9, 2012
Season Six	24	December 18, 2012	March 20, 2013
