= The Lucy Show =

American sitcom (1962–1968)

- Logo used from season 3
- Also known as: The Lucille Ball Show
- Genre: Sitcom
- Created by: Bob Carroll Jr.; Madelyn Davis; Bob Schiller; Bob Weiskopf; Lucille Ball
- Based on: Life Without George by Irene Kampen
- Directed by: Jack Donohue; Maury Thompson
- Starring: Lucille Ball; Vivian Vance; Gale Gordon; Mary Jane Croft; Candy Moore; Ralph Hart; Jimmy Garrett
- Narrated by: Roy Rowan
- Theme music composer: Wilbur Hatch
- Composers: Wilbur Hatch; Julian Davidson
- Country of origin: United States
- Original language: English
- No. of seasons: 6
- No. of episodes: 156 (list of episodes)

Production
- Executive producers: Desi Arnaz (episodes 1–15); Elliott Lewis (1962–1964); Lucille Ball; Gary Morton
- Producers: Elliott Lewis (1962); Tommy Thompson; Jack Donohue
- Camera setup: Multi-camera
- Running time: 30 minutes per episode
- Production companies: Desilu Productions; Paramount Television (1968, season 6)

Original release
- Network: CBS
- Release: October 1, 1962 – March 11, 1968

Related
- I Love Lucy; Here's Lucy

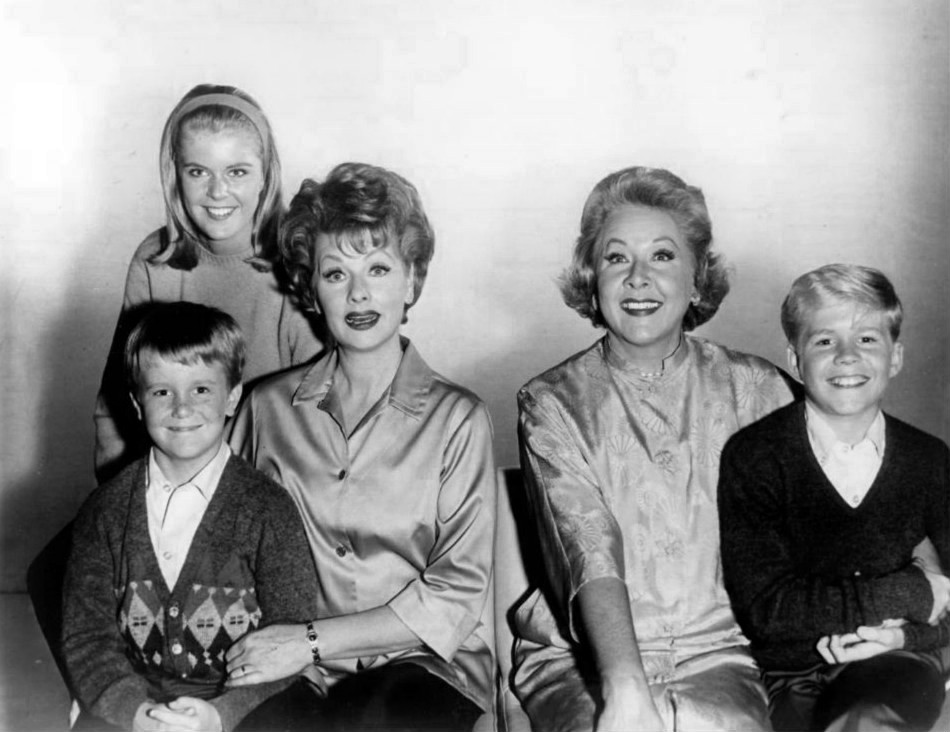
The original cast (l-r): Jimmy Garrett (Jerry Carmichael), Candy Moore (Chris Carmichael), Lucille Ball (Lucy Carmichael), Vivian Vance (Vivian Bagley), Ralph Hart (Sherman Bagley).

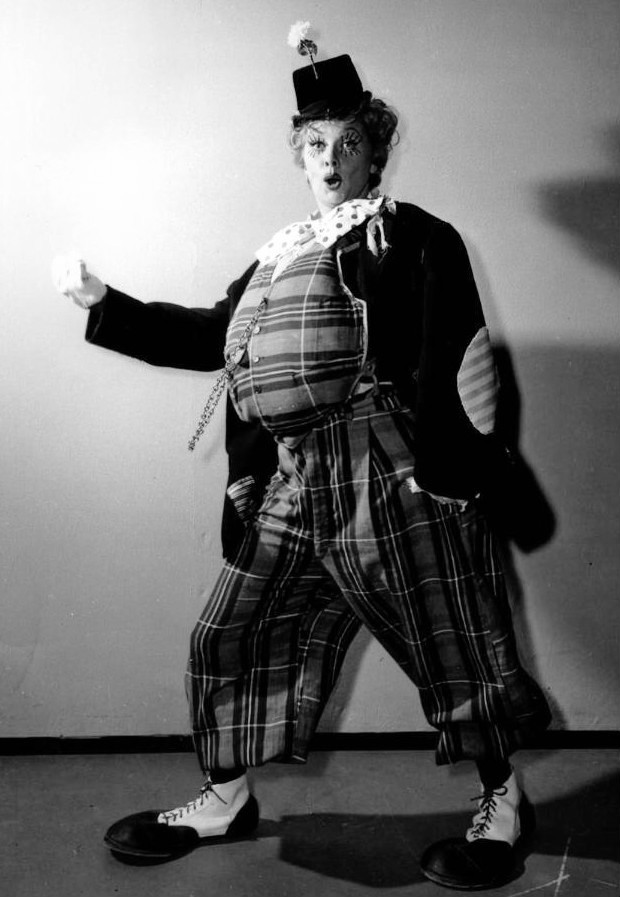
From the episode "Kiddie Parties, Inc." (1963)

The Lucy Show is an American sitcom that aired on CBS from 1962 to 1968. It was Lucille Ball's follow-up to I Love Lucy. A significant change in cast and premise for the fourth season (1965–1966) divides the program into two distinct eras; aside from Ball, only Gale Gordon, who joined the program for its second season, remained. For the first three seasons, Vivian Vance was the co-star.

The earliest scripts were titled The Lucille Ball Show; but, when that title was rejected by CBS, producers thought of calling the show This Is Lucy or The New Adventures of Lucy, before deciding on the title The Lucy Show. Ball won consecutive Emmy Awards as Outstanding Lead Actress in a Comedy Series for the series' final two seasons, 1966–67 and 1967–68.

== Creation ==
In 1960, Lucille Ball and Desi Arnaz divorced, and the final episode of The Lucy–Desi Comedy Hour aired (using the I Love Lucy format). Later that year, Ball moved to New York to try the Broadway stage in an unsuccessful musical, Wildcat. During the show's run, Ball was plagued by illness and fatigue and in early 1961, the show closed when she collapsed on stage from total exhaustion. Later that year, she married for the second time, to comedian Gary Morton.

Ball returned to television in the spring of 1962, when she teamed with Henry Fonda in The Good Years, a TV special on CBS. She adamantly refused to return to weekly television, as she was convinced she could never top the success of I Love Lucy.

At that time, Desilu Productions was struggling. In the spring of 1961, four of the studio's situation comedies were cancelled: The Ann Sothern Show; Angel, a sitcom starring Marshall Thompson and French actress Annie Farge; Harrigan and Son, starring Pat O'Brien and Roger Perry; and Guestward, Ho!, starring Joanne Dru and Mark Miller. In the spring of 1962, after a two-year run, the comedy series Pete and Gladys (a spin-off of the popular Desilu sitcom December Bride) was canceled. It starred Harry Morgan and Cara Williams in the title roles. At that time, the red-headed Williams, who had been promoted as the next Lucille Ball, had just received an Emmy nomination as Best Actress in a Comedy Series for her role on the show. That left Desilu with only one hit series, The Untouchables.

Arnaz, as president of Desilu, offered Ball an opportunity to return to television in a weekly sitcom. At that time, CBS executives were somewhat dubious as to whether Ball could carry a show without Arnaz, and whether she could follow such a landmark series as I Love Lucy. It was "never intended for this program to go beyond a single season." This arrangement was "meant to be a stop-gap measure for the beleaguered studio" and that through the sale of this series, Desilu was able to "force the CBS network to invest in and air other upcoming Desilu products." It was a strategy that Ball would use in the future to take control of The Lucy Show's renewal from CBS. With Arnaz's encouragement and persuasion, Ball agreed to do the show, provided that it would be shown on Monday nights (the night on which I Love Lucy had aired), and that she would be reunited with Vivian Vance and her writers from I Love Lucy. CBS agreed to a full season of episodes without a pilot, and The Lucy Show premiered on Monday, October 1, 1962, at 8:30 p.m.

== Premise ==
The original premise of the series was that widow Lucy Carmichael lives in the fictional town of Danfield, New York with her teenage daughter Chris and younger son Jerry, with her divorced friend Vivian "Viv" Bagley and Bagley's young son Sherman as tenants. Early episodes included their next-door neighbor, Harry Connors. Lucy's late husband left her a substantial trust fund, managed by a local banker (originally recurring character Mr. Barnsdahl, and later regular character Mr. Mooney); Lucy would frequently try to persuade the bank to let her raid the fund for various purchases or harebrained projects. Lucy also took on various jobs to boost her finances. Lucy, Viv, and Chris all dated regularly, yielding additional fodder for plots; in early episodes, Viv had a regular boyfriend, Eddie Collins.

In 1965, the show was extensively retooled for its fourth season. Lucy moves to Los Angeles to be closer to Chris, who was attending college in California (but no longer appeared on the show), and enrolls Jerry in a military boarding school there (facilitating him also being written out). Viv, now remarried as Vivian Bunson, remains in Danfield with Sherman, but visits Lucy a few times; Lucy's new best friend is Mary Jane Lewis. Lucy finds that Mr. Mooney has been transferred to the Los Angeles branch of the bank, and she eventually becomes his employee there. The new setting provided ample opportunity for celebrities to appear as themselves, often becoming entangled in Lucy's zany schemes. References to Lucy's children and her trust fund were eventually dropped, and this remained the show's premise through the sixth and final season.

== Production ==
The show began with Lucille Ball as Lucy Carmichael, a widow with two children, Chris (Candy Moore) and Jerry (Jimmy Garrett), living in the fictional town of Danfield, New York, sharing her home with divorced friend Vivian Bagley (Vance) and her son, Sherman (Ralph Hart). In order to get Vance to commit to the series, Arnaz acquiesced to her demands for an increase in salary, co-star billing, a more attractive wardrobe - though it remained somewhat dowdy - and, finally, that her character's name be Vivian. After doing I Love Lucy, she was still being referred to as Ethel Mertz by people on the street, much to her annoyance.

Although the book on which the show was based, Irene Kampen's Life Without George, centered on two divorcées living together in the same house raising their children, it was decided early on that the Lucy Carmichael character should instead be a widow. The consensus was that fans would be offended by a Lucy who was divorced, despite the fact that this was a new character and Ball herself was divorced. The character of Vivian Bagley became the first divorced woman on primetime television.

In the show's original format, Lucy had been left with a substantial trust fund by her late husband, which was managed during the first season by local banker Mr. Barnsdahl (Charles Lane). Comedian Dick Martin, working solo from his longtime partner Dan Rowan, was cast in ten episodes as Lucy's next-door neighbor and frequent boyfriend, Harry Connors, during the show's first season. Character actor Don Briggs was also featured in six episodes as Viv's beau, Eddie Collins, and Tom Lowell, a young actor seen on various primetime television shows, appeared in three installments as Chris Carmichael's boyfriend, Alan Harper. The first season of The Lucy Show fully utilized the talents of Bob Carroll Jr., Madelyn Martin, Bob Schiller, and Bob Weiskopf (four of the five original writers of I Love Lucy) in creating its thirty episodes, with Desi Arnaz as executive producer for fifteen of those shows. At the end of its first season, The Lucy Show received highly positive reviews from the critics and ranked #5 in the Nielsen seasonal ratings. Ball was nominated for an Emmy Award as Best Actress in a Series, but lost to Shirley Booth for the NBC comedy hit Hazel. On the strength of its high ratings, the series was renewed for a second year, but a number of significant changes were made.

At the beginning of the 1962–63 season, Desi Arnaz resigned as head of Desilu and as the executive producer of The Lucy Show. Ball took over as president of the studio and Elliott Lewis replaced Arnaz as executive producer of Ball's series. Dick Martin, Don Briggs, Tom Lowell, and Charles Lane left the show. The characters of Harry Connors and Alan Harper were never mentioned again. Briggs would make one more appearance as Eddie Collins in the episode "Lucy Goes Duck Hunting". The Barnsdahl character was replaced by Theodore J. Mooney, played by Gale Gordon, who would remain with the series for the remainder of its run, surviving another format change. In the episode "Lucy Gets Locked in the Vault", Gordon's character is introduced when Lucy discovers that Mr. Barnsdahl has been transferred to another bank and that the management of her trust fund has been taken over by a new banker. The name "Theodore J. Mooney" had been used earlier by the actor George Cisar, who was cast as a police sergeant on thirty-one episodes of Gordon's other CBS sitcom, Dennis the Menace.

Gordon had worked with Ball as far back as 1938 on the CBS radio program The Wonder Show and later worked with her on another radio show, My Favorite Husband. When CBS retooled My Favorite Husband for television as I Love Lucy, Gordon was offered the role of Fred Mertz, but he was already committed to the radio series Our Miss Brooks (which also was about to move to television) so William Frawley was cast in the part. In 1952, Gordon guest starred on the first season of I Love Lucy as Ricky Ricardo's boss at the Tropicana, Alvin Littlefield. Six years later, Gordon became a regular on the short-lived NBC-TV sitcom Sally which starred actress Joan Caulfield (who inherited Lucille Ball's role as Liz Cooper when My Favorite Husband was directly adapted to television in 1953). In the late fall of 1958, Gordon guest-starred as a judge in the hour-long The Lucy–Desi Comedy Hour episode "Lucy Makes Room for Danny". From 1960 to 1962, he had recurring roles on two CBS-TV sitcoms – The Danny Thomas Show and Pete and Gladys. Gordon was to have joined The Lucy Show at its premiere in the fall of 1962, but he was still contractually obligated to Dennis the Menace, in which he had replaced Joseph Kearns, who had unexpectedly died earlier in the year. It was later revealed that Ball had grown unhappy with Charles Lane because of his difficulty remembering his lines in front of the studio audience and was eager to have Gordon join the cast. Lane then became a semi-regular on the CBS-TV sitcom Petticoat Junction as Homer Bedloe.

During the first two seasons, a few guest stars were brought in for some episodes such as Broadway superstar Ethel Merman, actor-comedian Wally Cox, singer Roberta Sherwood, and golf pros Jimmy Demaret and Bo Wininger. Character actor-comedian Hans Conried, who was a semi-regular on The Danny Thomas Show playing Uncle Tonoose, appeared on two episodes of The Lucy Show in 1963 ("Lucy's Barbershop Quartet" and "Lucy Plays Cleopatra") playing Dr. Gitterman, a voice teacher. At this time, Ball also used many other well-known character actors in featured parts such as Carole Cook, Mary Wickes, Roscoe Karns, John McGiver, William Schallert, John Carradine, Robert Alda, Majel Barrett, Karen Norris, Dorothy Konrad, Lou Krugman, Stafford Repp, Ellen Corby, Philip Carey, Carl Benton Reid, Lyle Talbot, Leon Ames, Jackie Coogan, Kathleen Freeman, Keith Andes (who was Ball's leading man in the Broadway musical Wildcat), William Windom, Vito Scotti. Robert Rockwell, Frank Aletter, Reta Shaw, Murvyn Vye, Hazel Pierce, J. Pat O'Malley, Roland Winters, Sandra Gould, Cesare Danova, Bobs Watson, Nancy Kulp, future Academy Award-winning actor Jack Albertson, and the so-called "Queen of the Hollywood Extras" Bess Flowers. In addition, young performers like Don Grady, Tina Cole, Barry Livingston, Eddie Applegate, Stephen Talbot, Lee Aaker, Eddie Hodges, and future Academy Award-nominee Michael J. Pollard and Ball's two children, Lucie Arnaz and Desi Arnaz Jr., made appearances on the program. In the second season, Ball's second husband Gary Morton made his acting debut on The Lucy Show.

At the end of the second season, a disagreement erupted between Ball and head writers Bob Carroll, Jr., and Madelyn Martin regarding a particular script which Ball found to be inferior. As a result, Carroll, Martin, Weiskopf and Schiller left the series.

In early 1964, the show was in threat of getting canceled when Lucille Ball attempted to retire from CBS to spend her time as president of Desilu Productions, but she changed her mind and signed a new three-year agreement with the network.

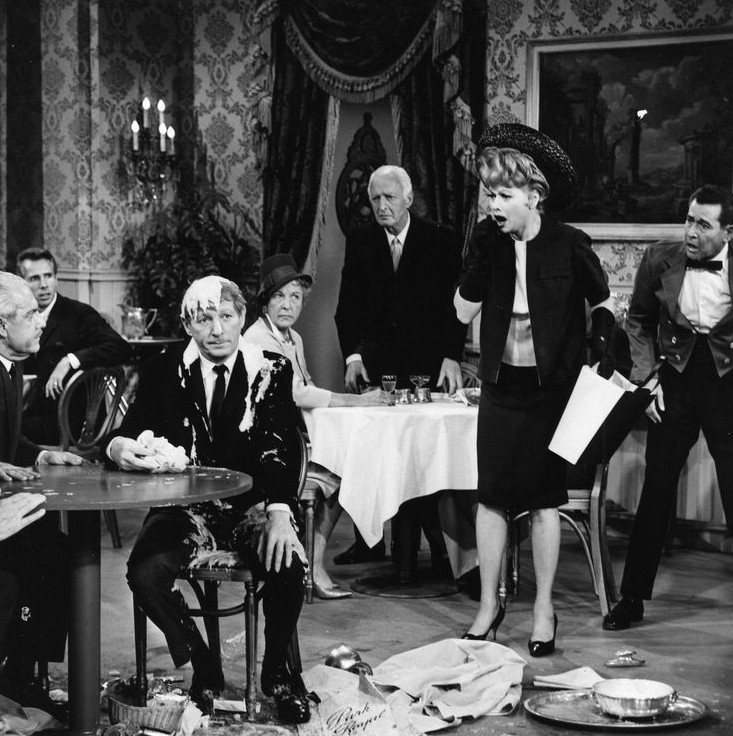
Lucy gets into the soup with Danny Kaye while trying to meet him, 1964.

In the fall of 1964, though CBS began to broadcast sporting events and cartoons in color, they still refused to broadcast The Lucy Show in color even though the series had been filmed in color since the start of the second season, 1963-1964. Through that year ownership of color TV sets grew, and several other manufacturers began making color equipment and color TV sets.

At the beginning of the 1964–65 season, The Lucy Show went through a significant staff change. Elliott Lewis left the series and was replaced as executive producer by Jack Donohue, who served as producer and director. With the absence of Carroll, Martin, Weiskopf, and Schiller, Ball hired veteran comedy writer Milt Josefsberg, who had written for Jack Benny, as script consultant. Under Josefsberg's supervision there were no permanent writers for the series and different writers were employed each week (among them, Garry Marshall). Ball persuaded Weiskopf and Schiller to return and write four installments.

There were further changes to the series. Vivian Vance reduced the number of episodes in which she appeared in that season to spend more time on the East Coast with her husband, literary editor John Dodds. Ann Sothern, whom Ball considered to be "the best comedian in the business, bar none" and a personal friend, made a number of appearances during 1964 and 1965 as the "Countess Framboise" (née Rosie Harrigan) to fill Vance's absence. The Countess, who had been widowed by the death of her husband, "who left her his noble title and all of his noble debts," was always trying to get money to pay off her debts. She also did battle with Mr. Mooney and, somewhat tongue-in-cheek, she addressed him as "Mr. Money," which he found mildly annoying, even as he gently attempted to correct her. Because it was known that Vance would be leaving the series, Sothern was proposed as the new co-star, but she declined. Sothern reportedly wanted to share top billing with Ball, who flatly refused to consider the notion. Sothern made three more guest appearances during the following (1965–66) season.

The Lucy Show was filmed on Stage 21 at Desilu Studios (now Paramount)

In the spring of 1965, Vance was growing tired of commuting weekly between her home on the East Coast and Los Angeles. To continue appearing on the show, Vance wanted more creative control with the opportunity to produce and direct episodes and to receive better pay. Agents and studio executives misinformed Ball regarding Vance's desires, believing that she wanted to be Ball's equal. It was decided not to meet Vance's requests, leaving both Ball and Vance feeling betrayed by the other. As a result, Vance decided to leave the series. Ball would later regret not giving Vance what she requested. Without Vance on the show, Ball seriously considered ending the series, feeling she could not continue without her.

Even though Candy Moore, Jimmy Garrett, and Ralph Hart were still contracted to the series, they were used minimally during the third year. For example, in the episode "Lucy and the Old Mansion", which was the final Season 3 installment, filmed in January 1965, Moore, Garrett, and Hart appear in the opening scene, have a few lines of dialogue, then exit. It is the last time in which all of the three children are seen, and they were subsequently written out in Season 4. Dropping Candy Moore, in fact, was Ball's decision. Because Moore was popular with teenagers and the subject of dozens of articles in youth-oriented magazines at the time, her departure was originally nixed by CBS but finally accepted when Ball threatened to "retire".

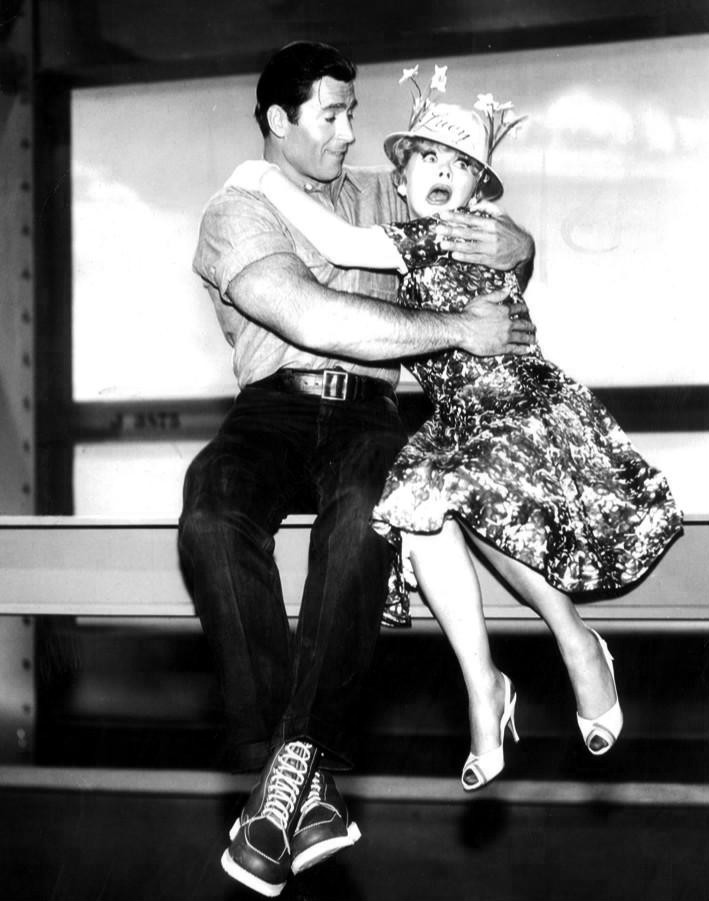
Clint Walker is a construction worker who takes Lucy atop a skyscraper under construction, where they both learn she is afraid of heights.

The third season included such guest stars as Jack Benny, Bob Hope, Danny Kaye, and Arthur Godfrey.

== Format, setting, and major cast changes ==
In the first episode of the fourth season, Lucy and Jerry Carmichael and Mr. Mooney moved from Danfield to California, where Lucy began working for Mr. Mooney at the bank. Lucy's daughter Chris was said to have gone away to college and was not mentioned again. It was explained that Vance's character (Vivian Bagley) remarried and that she, along with her son Sherman and her new husband, remained in Danfield, although she returned for a few guest appearances towards the end of the series' run. With Candy Moore and Ralph Hart having already left the show at this point, only Jimmy Garrett was retained, but he would make only two appearances to support the transition before he, too, was phased out of the series.

This procedure was later explained by Oscar Katz, one of Desilu's vice presidents. According to Katz, "If you go into a network with the same series but a radically changed format, the contracts allow for greater financial renegotiation." Candy Moore adds, "By dropping all of us at once, Desilu was able to get a lot more money out of CBS for the continuation of The Lucy Show."

In the fourth season premiere episode, "Lucy at Marineland", Jerry was quickly shipped off to a military academy. He made one final appearance, in a Christmas-themed episode, midway in the 1965–66 season. Sothern made three more guest appearances as the Countess, and Joan Blondell guest-starred in two episodes as Lucy's new friend Joan Brenner. However, Ball felt there was no chemistry between them and so, the idea of Blondell becoming Lucy's new comrade on the series was quickly rejected.

Finally, Lucy gained a new best friend, Mary Jane Lewis (Mary Jane Croft). Croft had prior experience performing with Ball and was the wife of former executive producer Elliott Lewis. In 1954, she made her first appearance on I Love Lucy playing Cynthia Harcourt, a rich friend of Lucy Ricardo in the episode "Lucy Is Envious". In 1956, she returned to the series playing Evelyn Bigsby, a traveler seated next to Lucy on an airplane in the fifth season finale, "Return Home from Europe". In 1957, she made her final appearances on the series as Lucy's neighbor Betty Ramsey in the sixth season. During the 1950s, Croft also had occasional roles on I Married Joan and Our Miss Brooks. She was also the voice of Cleo the basset hound in the sitcom The People's Choice. Croft then portrayed Lucy Carmichael's friend Audrey Simmons during the 1962–64 episodes of The Lucy Show. In the third season, with the departure of Elliott Lewis as executive producer, Croft had also left the series, although her character of Audrey was still referred to in a few episodes but never seen. At this time, Croft had also been a regular for ten years on the long-running ABC-TV sitcom The Adventures of Ozzie and Harriet, which was in its final year of production in 1965. In returning to The Lucy Show in the fall of 1965 as a new character, Croft was replacing Vivian Vance as Lucy's pal and co-conspirator. She did not, however, get co-star billing – like Roy Roberts, who played Mooney's boss at the bank, Mr. Cheever, she received featured billing despite playing a regular character.

By January 1966, all references to Lucy Carmichael's children, her trust fund, and her former life in Danfield were dropped. Lucy Carmichael was firmly established as a single woman living in Los Angeles. Lucy worked in films disguised as stunt man "'Iron Man' Carmichael" for three episodes ("Lucy the Stunt Man", "Lucy and the Return of Iron Man", and "Lucy and Bob Crane"). At the end of the 1965–66 season Lucille Ball was nominated for her second Emmy for The Lucy Show as Best Actress in a Comedy Series, however, Mary Tyler Moore took home the trophy for her role as Laura Petrie for The Dick Van Dyke Show.

The next two seasons featured many stars making guest appearances as themselves conducting business at Lucy's bank. For the last two seasons, Vivian Vance made three guest appearances in her role as Vivian Bagley (except it was now Vivian Bunson, as her character had gotten married again when Lucy Carmichael moved to California). In all three episodes in which Viv visited Lucy, there were passing references to their former life in Danfield as well as Viv's new husband, but no mention was made about any of their children. In the fifth-year episode "Lucy Gets Caught Up in the Draft", Lucy Carmichael receives a letter from her son, who is away in military school. In that installment, he is called Jimmy, not Jerry. During the filming of that particular show, Ball was constantly being corrected by her crew saying that the son's name was Jerry and that Jimmy Garrett had played that part and that was the reason for her being confused. However, Ball refused to listen and so the error stayed in and that was the last reference to Lucy Carmichael's son. For the 1966–67 season, Gale Gordon was nominated for an Emmy Award as Best Supporting Actor in a Comedy Series, but lost to Don Knotts, who won for his guest appearance in the episode "The Return of Barney Fife" on The Andy Griffith Show. Maury Thompson received a nomination for Best Directing in a Comedy Series and is the only Lucy director ever to receive a nomination in the directing category. After eleven years, Ball was finally awarded an Emmy as "Best Actress in a Comedy Series" (she had previously won two, as "Best Comedienne" in 1953 and as "Best Actress in a Continuing Performance" in 1956 for I Love Lucy).

During the 1967–68 season, Ball's second husband, Gary Morton, became executive producer of The Lucy Show. Lucille Ball sold Desilu Productions to Gulf+Western Industries, abandoning ownership of the series. In the spring of 1968, The Lucy Show won Emmy nominations for Best Comedy Series, Milt Josefsberg and Ray Singer for Best Writing in a Comedy Series, Lucille Ball for Best Actress in a Comedy Series, and Best Supporting Actor in a Comedy Series (Gale Gordon). This time, Gordon lost the award to Werner Klemperer of Hogan's Heroes, and the show itself lost the Best Comedy Series Award to the NBC sitcom Get Smart. For the second straight year, Ball was awarded the coveted statuette. At the end of its sixth season, The Lucy Show posted its highest Nielsen rating, ranking at #2.

After six seasons, Ball decided to end the series, feeling that the show had enough episodes for syndication. Ball opted to continue on television under the provision that her two children, Lucie Arnaz and Desi Arnaz Jr., agreed to appear alongside her. Thus, in the fall of 1968, an entirely new series, Here's Lucy, debuted. This series featured her and her children, as well as Gordon. Croft was gradually added as a regular and Vance made several guest appearances. Gordon, as well as both actresses, played new characters which were similar to their characters on the former series. Like I Love Lucy and The Lucy Show, Here's Lucy also ran on CBS for six seasons.

== Cast ==
Actor	Character	Season 1	Season 2	Season 3	Season 4	Season 5	Season 6
Actor	Character	1962–63	1963–64	1964–65	1965–66	1966–67	1967–68
Lucille Ball	Lucille Carmichael	Starring	Starring	Starring	Starring	Starring	Starring
Vivian Vance	Vivian Bagley	Starring	Starring	Starring	N/A	Guest	Guest
Gale Gordon	Theodore J. Mooney	N/A	Regular	Regular	Starring	Starring	Starring
Mary Jane Croft	Audrey Simmons/ Mary Jane Lewis	Recurring	Recurring	N/A	Regular	Regular	Regular
Candy Moore	Chris Carmichael	Regular	Regular	Recurring	N/A	N/A	N/A
Jimmy Garrett	Jerry Carmichael	Regular	Regular	Recurring	Recurring	N/A	N/A
Ralph Hart	Sherman Bagley	Regular	Regular	Recurring	N/A	N/A	N/A
Dick Martin	Harry	Recurring	N/A	N/A	N/A	N/A	N/A
Charles Lane	Mr. Barnsdahl	Recurring	N/A	N/A	N/A	N/A	N/A

== Guest stars ==
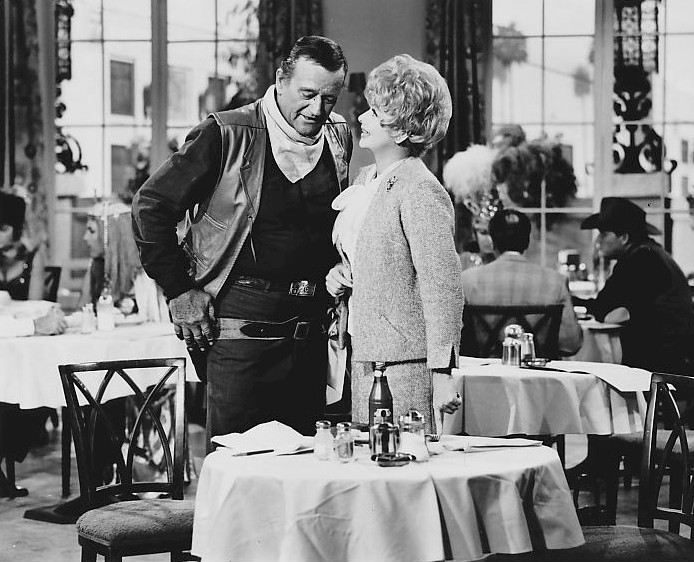
Guest star John Wayne on a 1966 episode

From the 1965–66 season onward, with the change in format, a number of celebrities guest starred on The Lucy Show, usually playing themselves under the premise that the Lucy Carmichael character, now living in Hollywood, crossed paths with them, either in her day-to-day life, or through her job at the bank. These included Jack Benny, Mickey Rooney, Carol Burnett, George Burns, Joan Crawford, Tennessee Ernie Ford, Dean Martin, Phil Silvers, Frankie Avalon, Wayne Newton, Robert Stack, Mel Tormé, John Vivyan, Jack Cassidy, Clint Walker, John Wayne and Milton Berle.

Other CBS shows were sometimes brought in. In the episode "Lucy and John Wayne", a photograph of Bob Crane as Colonel Hogan from Hogan's Heroes can be seen as guest star Wayne is exiting a scene.

The episode featuring Joan Crawford, "Lucy and the Lost Star", caused much celebrity fodder given Ball and Crawford's public feud during the filming. According to Ball, Crawford was often drunk on the set and could not remember her lines. Ball was said to have requested several times to replace Crawford with Gloria Swanson, who was supposed to have filled the role originally but bowed out for health reasons. Crawford was so upset that at one point, she wouldn't leave her dressing room. According to Ball's friend the singer-comedian Kaye Ballard, it was Vanda Barra, a featured actress frequently used on The Lucy Show, who finally persuaded Crawford to continue with the show by giving her a much needed pep talk. As a result, Crawford sailed through the filming with nary a flaw. After the show was filmed, Crawford went out of her way to thank Barra for encouraging and supporting her.

Ball and Vance in a 1967 episode

The February 14, 1966 episode featuring Dean Martin (in which Lucy Carmichael accepts a blind date with Dean Martin's lookalike stunt double "Eddie Feldman," but when he can't make it, the real Dean Martin takes his place on the date with Lucy) was described by Ball as her favorite episode of the series.

Lucie Arnaz, Ball's daughter, appeared in several episodes of the show during its run: she was an extra in the first season's third episode, "Lucy Is a Referee," the teenage best friend of Chris in "Lucy Is a Soda Jerk" and "Lucy Is a Chaperone" (though she was only 12 at the time), and later as one of her mother's friends, Dottie, in the 1967 "Lucy and Robert Goulet" (although she was only 16). She was also seen briefly as a teen walking past Lucy and Mr. Mooney in the episode "Lucy and the Ring a Ding Ring". She was also seen playing a student named Patty in the episode "Lucy Gets Her Diploma".

In addition, Desi Arnaz, Jr. appeared in six episodes on The Lucy Show as Mary Jane Croft's son Billy Simmons ("Lucy Is A Referee", "Lucy Visits the White House", "Lucy and the Little League", and "Lucy and the Scout Trip"). Lucie Arnaz appeared with her brother Desi Arnaz Jr. (Lucille Ball and Desi Arnaz's son) briefly in the first episode of the fourth season, "Lucy at Marineland".

The October 1965 episode, "Lucy and the Countess Have a Horse Guest" reunited Ball and her former I Love Lucy co-star William Frawley, who played a small role as a horse trainer, for the last time. It was his last television appearance, six months before he died. In the episode credits, he's listed as "Our Own Bill Frawley"

== Opening credits ==
Season 1 opening credits (1962–1963): animations of Lucille Ball and Vivian Vance. Opening credits were changed throughout the show's run.

A different opening sequence was created for each season:

- Season 1 (1962–63): animated stick figures of Ball and Vance were used (similar to the ones used in the original opening sequences of I Love Lucy and of the subsequent 13 hour-long specials later syndicated in reruns as The Lucy–Desi Comedy Hour).
- Season 2 (1963–1964): stills from previous episodes
- Season 3 (1964–1965): Clips appear from previous episodes
- Season 4 (1965–1966): Clips from previous episodes appear viewed from a kaleidoscope. The titles were designed by Howard Anderson Jr., who was also responsible for the "heart" opening for I Love Lucy.
- Season 5 (1966–1967): an additional opening was created at the beginning of the season that featured Lucille Ball as an animated "jack-in-the-box". Ball reportedly hated it, and it was only used in a handful of episodes at the start of the season before being replaced by a slightly revamped version of the kaleidoscope opening. However, because of poor editing, the theme music to this opening was retained while the kaleidoscope opening played for several of the early 1966 fall episodes.
- Season 6 (1967–1968): the kaleidoscope opening was used once again, but the theme music was reorchestrated. Also the "Glamour Shot" of Ball at the end of the opening is a different clip than season five. For the episodes in which Gale Gordon did not appear, the "Co-Starring: Gale Gordon" voiceover was omitted from the audio track.

During later television airings, including 1970s and 1980s syndicated runs, as well as Nick at Nite's 1990s reruns of the series, the later "kaleidoscope" opening was used in nearly all episodes (with a "costarring Vivian Vance" voiceover edited in for episodes from the first three seasons).

The theme music was composed by Wilbur Hatch, who was the show's musical director, a role he also performed on Ball's previous series I Love Lucy.

== Episodes ==
Season	Episodes	Originally released		Rank	Rating	Households (millions)
Season	Episodes	First released	Last released	Rank	Rating	Households (millions)
1	30	October 1, 1962	April 29, 1963	4	29.8 (Note: Tied with Bonanza)	14.99
2	28	September 30, 1963	April 27, 1964	6	28.1	15.00
3	26	September 21, 1964	April 12, 1965	8	26.6	14.02
4	26	September 13, 1965	March 21, 1966	3	27.7	14.92
5	22	September 12, 1966	March 6, 1967	4	26.2	14.44
6	24	September 11, 1967	March 11, 1968	2	27.0	15.30

=== Unproduced episodes ===
There were several scripts written that were never filmed. "Lucy & Viv Fight Over Harry" was set to be produced as the 11th episode in the first season, but there were too many "production problems" and the episode was canceled. In an interview with Jimmy Garrett, he said the audience barely laughed at rehearsals, and Desi Arnaz cancelled the episode with Lucille Ball's permission. During season 2, both "Lucy is a Girl Friday" and "Lucy Plays Basketball" were canceled before filming began as well. The details of these "lost" episodes can be found on the official DVD sets for the first two seasons.

== Awards ==
Primetime Emmy Awards
Year	Season	Category	Recipient(s)	Outcome
1963	1	Outstanding Continued Performance by an Actress in a Series (Lead)	Lucille Ball	Nominated
1966	4	Outstanding Lead Actress in a Comedy Series	Lucille Ball	Nominated
1967	5	Outstanding Lead Actress in a Comedy Series	Lucille Ball	Won
1967	5	Outstanding Supporting Actor in a Comedy Series	Gale Gordon	Nominated
1967	5	Outstanding Directorial Achievement in Comedy	Maury Thompson	Nominated
1968	6	Outstanding Comedy Series	Tommy Thompson	Nominated
1968	6	Outstanding Lead Actress in a Comedy Series	Lucille Ball	Won
1968	6	Outstanding Supporting Actor in a Comedy Series	Gale Gordon	Nominated
1968	6	Outstanding Writing for a Comedy Series	Milt Josefsberg & Ray Singer for "Lucy Gets Jack Benny's Bank Account"	Nominated

== Filming ==
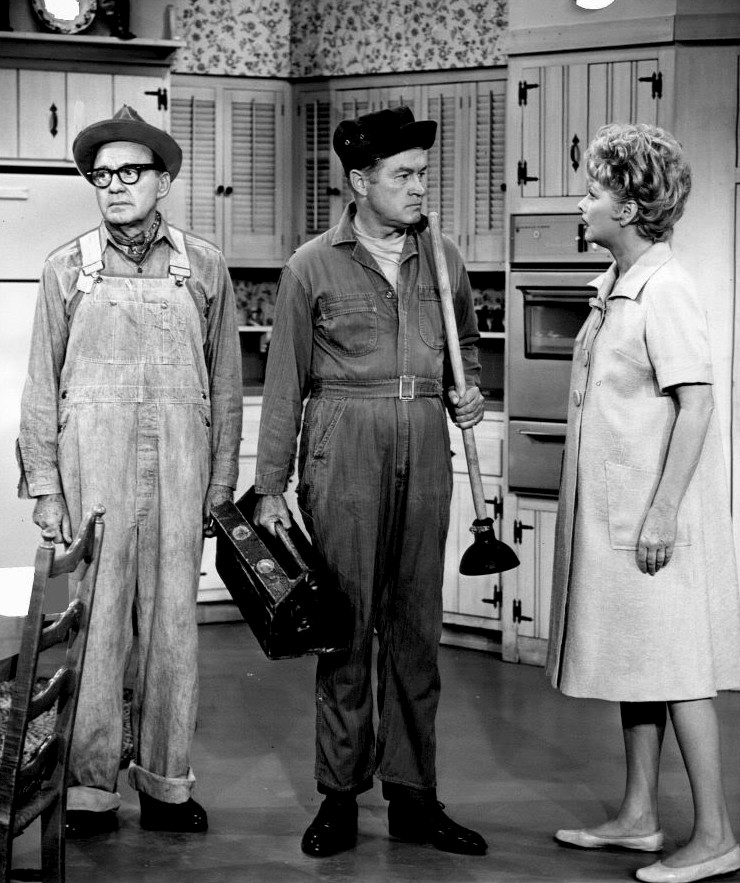
L-R: Jack Benny, Bob Hope and Lucy - "Lucy and the Plumber" (1964)

Unlike most sitcoms of the era, The Lucy Show was filmed before a live audience; standard practice at the time was to film an episode on a closed set and add a laugh track during post-production. However, a laugh track was still used to fill any gaps in audience reactions or missed punchlines. The live format was used for all I Love Lucy episodes, for all but a few Lucy–Desi Comedy Hour installments and on The Lucy Show. Arnaz felt Ball performed better in front of a live studio audience. Carole Cook, Ball's long-time friend and protégée in a radio show Great Lives based on Lucille Ball said that three cameras were used to capture everything in one go, and the best angles would be used. While Ball would ad-lib during rehearsals, she followed the script when filming the actual show.

While filming the 1963 episode "Lucy and Viv Put In A Shower", in which the leading ladies attempted to install a shower stall (but become trapped inside, unable to shut the water off), Ball nearly drowned while performing in the tank of water. She was unable to bring herself back to the surface, and it was Vance who realized there was a problem and pulled her co-star to safety; Vance went on to ad lib until Ball could catch her breath to resume speaking her lines (all the while, cameras continued to film). Neither the film crew nor the live studio audience realized there was a problem.

In her autobiography Love, Lucy, Lucy talks of this episode:

...I found I had no room to manoeuvre. I couldn't get back to the surface again. What's more I swallowed a lot of water and was actually drowning right there in front of three hundred people who were splitting their sides laughing. Vivian (Vance), realising in cold terror what had happened, never changed expression. She reached down, pulled me safely to the surface by the roots of my hair and then calmly spoke both sides of our dialogue, putting my lines in the form of questions. Whatta girl! And whatta night.

The two special episodes to feature Ethel Merman ("Lucy Teaches Ethel Merman to Sing" and "Ethel Merman and the Boy Scout Show") were originally just one episode, "Lucy Teaches Ethel Merman to Sing". This installment was a consolation prize to Merman after her Desilu-produced pilot, Maggie Brown, was rejected as a regular series by CBS. The plot was much as it remains today with Lucy and Viv trying to pass off Agnes Schmidlap as Ethel Merman, not knowing that it really is Ethel Merman, and Lucy attempts to teach her how to sing. In the original version, Lucy's voice lesson scene with Merman (which was lifted from the previous season's episode "Lucy's Barbershop Quartet" in which Hans Conried was the instructor and Lucy the pupil) was much shorter than it is today and that episode ended with the Boy Scout show, with Jerry Carmichael hosting, Sherman Bagley dancing, and Lucy joining Ethel for a brand new version of Merman's great hit "Anything You Can Do (I Can Do Better)". But then, Desilu Productions thought that maybe too much had been crammed into one half-hour and since Ball and Vance (who both were great friends of Merman) were having such a marvelous time working with the legendary Broadway belter, they decided to expand it into two episodes, thereby taking advantage of Merman's formidable talents. So, a second filming was scheduled. In Part 1, Ethel was to be the houseguest of Lucy and Viv for a few weeks, and then in Part 2, a full blown episode was created that included scenes of Lucy once again, trying to get into the act. An all new Boy Scout show was filmed also, with Jerry once again hosting, Sherman dancing, and Lucy, Viv, and Ethel, this time joined by Mr. Mooney, singing and dancing through a history of show business.

An episode from the 1966–1967 season called "Lucy Flies to London" served as the basis for a standalone one-hour special called Lucy in London, which featured Ball with guest stars Anthony Newley and the Dave Clark Five. Much of the "Lucy Flies to London" episode, which centered around Lucy's lack of experience in air travel, was based on an unsold pilot shot in 1960 that was written by Bob Carroll, Jr. and Madelyn Pugh Martin Davis. It starred Lucille Ball and Gale Gordon. Desi Arnaz was the director.

== Comic book ==
A comic book adaptation, The Lucy Show, was published by Gold Key Comics, running for five issues, from June 1963 to June 1964.

== Home media ==
Before July 2009, there were only thirty episodes available on DVD and/or VHS (two episodes from the first season, twenty-one from the fifth season, and seven from the sixth season), all of which are believed to be in the public domain due to copyright oversights. These episodes have been released by unauthorized companies like Vintage Home Entertainment, Mill Creek Entertainment, Alpha Video, Digiview, Front Row Entertainment, Diamond Entertainment, Madacy Entertainment and Echo Bridge Home Entertainment.

CBS DVD (distributed by Paramount Home Entertainment) has released all six seasons of The Lucy Show on DVD in Region 1, as of October 9, 2012. CBS announced that all the episodes have been restored and remastered using the original film negatives, and was presented uncut in its original broadcast form. However, some of the episodes were edited from the original, uncut versions due to expensive costing issues, as well as the original music scores were replaced due to music licensing issues.

The first three official DVD releases allow viewers to view the original openings, closings, and cast commercials directly in the episode, while the fourth, fifth and sixth season DVD releases do not have this function.

The Complete Series was released on November 15, 2016.

In Australia, The Complete Series was released on April 1, 2020, and is distributed by Shock Entertainment.

DVD name	Ep #	Release date	Bonus Features
The Official First Season	30	July 21, 2009	Closed-captioned; New Interviews with Lucie Arnaz & Jimmy Garrett; Clips from "Opening Night" Special; Vintage Openings/Closings; Cast Commercials; Vintage Network Promos; Cast Biographies; Production Notes; Photo Gallery; "The Lucy Show": Vintage Merchandise
The Official Second Season	28	July 13, 2010	Vintage Openings/Closings; The Lucille Ball Comedy Hour (1964) with Bob Hope; Newly-Recorded Interview with Carole Cook; Newly recorded Interview with Barry Livingston; Cast Commercials; Clips from Opening Night & CBS: The Stars' Address; Production Notes; Photo Gallery
The Official Third Season	26	November 30, 2010	Featurette-Lucille Ball at the 1964 World's Fair for Lucille Ball Day; Clips from The Danny Kaye Show; Vintage Openings/Closings; Rare International Promos & Film Clips; Cast Commercials; Production Notes; Photo Gallery
The Official Fourth Season	26	April 26, 2011	"The Magic of Broadcasting" (Behind-the-scenes of "Lucy, the Robot"); Cast Biographies; Vintage Openings/Closings; Danny Thomas The Wonderful World of Burlesque; Network Promos; Behind-the-Scenes Footage of "Lucy in Marineland"; Production Notes; Photo Gallery
The Official Fifth Season	22	December 6, 2011	"Lucy in London"; "Lucy in London Revisited" (Documentary); Clip from 1967 Emmy Awards; Clip from 1966 Affiliates Presentation; Clip from "Victor Borge Comedy Theatre"; "25 Years of Savings Bonds"; Bloopers; Rare Promos; Vintage Openings & Closings; Guest Cast Biographies; Production Notes; Photo Galleries
The Official Sixth Season	24	October 9, 2012	Clip from 1968 Emmy Awards; Blooper Reel; Vintage Openings & Closings; Cast Biographies; Production Notes; Photo Galleries
The Official Complete Series	156	November 15, 2016	Same as individual releases

=== Other releases ===
In September 2018, Time Life released a DVD, Lucy: The Ultimate Collection, that contains 24 episodes of The Lucy Show, and which also collected 32 episodes of I Love Lucy, as well as 14 episodes of Here's Lucy, and 4 episodes of the short-lived ABC-TV series Life with Lucy (which had at the time never before been released to home media), plus a wide variety of bonus features.

== See also ==
- Fidelman, Geoffrey Mark. “The Lucy Book: A Complete Guide to Her Five Decades on Television,” 1999. Renaissance Books. ISBN 1-58063-051-0.
