= List of I Love Lucy episodes =

I Love Lucy is an American television sitcom starring Lucille Ball, Desi Arnaz, Vivian Vance and William Frawley. The 180 black-and-white episodes originally ran on Monday nights from October 15, 1951 to May 6, 1957 on CBS. The pilot episode, which was not produced for broadcast and did not air during the show's original run, is generally excluded from the list of episodes, although it is available in the DVD and Blu-ray releases of the first season.

Following I Love Lucy, 13 hour-long episodes were produced under the title of The Lucille Ball-Desi Arnaz Show (later and more commonly known in syndication as The Lucy–Desi Comedy Hour), with the same cast and later packaged for syndication as Seasons 7, 8 and 9 of the I Love Lucy series.

== Series overview ==
Series	Season	Episodes	Originally released		Rank	Rating	Households (millions)
Series	Season	Episodes	First released	Last released	Rank	Rating	Households (millions)
I Love Lucy	1	35	October 15, 1951	June 9, 1952	3	50.9	7.78
I Love Lucy	2	31	September 15, 1952	June 29, 1953	1	67.3	13.72
I Love Lucy	3	31	October 5, 1953	May 24, 1954	1	58.8	15.28
I Love Lucy	4	30	October 4, 1954	May 30, 1955	1	49.3	15.13
I Love Lucy	5	26	October 3, 1955	May 14, 1956	2	46.1	16.08
I Love Lucy	6	27	October 1, 1956	May 6, 1957	1	43.7	16.99
The Lucy–Desi Comedy Hour	1	5	November 6, 1957	April 14, 1958	—N/a	—N/a	—N/a
The Lucy–Desi Comedy Hour	2	5	October 6, 1958	June 5, 1959	—N/a	—N/a	—N/a
The Lucy–Desi Comedy Hour	3	3	September 25, 1959	April 1, 1960	—N/a	—N/a	—N/a

== Episodes ==
=== Unaired pilot ===
The unaired pilot was kinescoped on March 2, 1951 and was considered lost until the widow of Pepito Pérez, a clown who appears in it, notified CBS Entertainment president Bud Grant that she owned a copy given to her husband by Desi Arnaz and Lucille Ball. The pilot was first broadcast as part of a 60-minute special on CBS television stations nationwide on Monday, April 30, 1990, 39 years after it was originally filmed. However, the opening titles and the initial voiceover were damaged or missing, so Lucie Arnaz read the beginning lines of the opening voiceover, which then segued into the surviving footage.

The original 2003 DVD edition of I Love Lucy contained the pilot episode with a reconstruction of the opening titles and voiceover. The original 35mm kinescope of the pilot was later located in the CBS archives and was included in the Season 1 Blu-ray release on August 4, 2015.

=== Season 1 (1951–52) ===
No. overall	No. in season	Title	Directed by	Written by	Film date	Original release date
1	1	"The Girls Want to Go to a Nightclub"	Marc Daniels	Jess Oppenheimer, Madelyn Pugh and Bob Carroll, Jr.	September 15, 1951	October 15, 1951
Ethel tells Lucy that Monday is her and Fred's 18th wedding anniversary. Meanwhile, Fred asks Ricky to celebrate his anniversary by going to Charlie's steakhouse and then the fights. The four get into an argument over where they will go Lucy decides to call up some old boyfriends with no luck. Ricky wonders whether the girls really can get dates. Ricky suggests getting a couple dates and go to The Copacabana to keep an eye on the wives. He calls Ginny Jones at the Starlight Room about potential dates. Lucy also calls Ginny and finds out about Ricky's call. Lucy tells Ginny that her and Ethel will be Ricky and Fred's blind dates. It's Monday night and Lucy and Ethel arrive at Lucy's apartment made up and dressed all goofy. The guys don't recognize the girls and try to get out of the dates. After a while Ricky figures out it's Lucy and Ethel and the four wind up going to the fights.
2	2	"Be a Pal"	Marc Daniels	Jess Oppenheimer, Madelyn Pugh and Bob Carroll, Jr.	September 21, 1951	October 22, 1951
Lucy is trying to talk to Ricky but he's reading the paper and isn't paying attention to her. Ethel reads to Lucy a book full of advice on how to rekindle the flame. The book says to dress up for your husband and make yourself beautiful. Lucy does make herself glamorous, but Ricky is still glued to the newspaper. Ethel checks the book again and it suggests that Lucy take up Ricky's hobbies. Ricky will be playing poker that night with Fred, Charlie and Hank (Richard Reeves). Lucy decides she'll join them. The guys reluctantly let Lucy sit in. Lucy doesn't really know how to play and it starts to annoy the guys. Ethel checks the book again. Lucy decorates the apartment with things to remind Ricky of his childhood in Cuba. She even adds chickens and a donkey. Lucy then puts on a performance as Carmen Miranda. She explains to Ricky why she did it.
3	3	"The Diet"	Marc Daniels	Jess Oppenheimer, Madelyn Pugh and Bob Carroll, Jr.	September 28, 1951	October 29, 1951
Lucy claims she weighs the same as when her and Ricky got married. Ricky brings out a scale and Lucy weighs 22 pounds more. Ricky gets a call that JoAnn, the girl that dances with him in his act at the Tropicana nightclub, has quit. Ricky needs to find a replacement by Saturday. He reluctantly agrees to let Lucy audition. At the club, the other girls make fun of Lucy. Ricky tells Lucy if she can fit into a size 12 dress, she can have the part. She only has four days. It's been three days and Lucy has ten more pounds to lose, but she is exhausted. By Saturday afternoon, Lucy finally makes it. Lucy gives a great performance with Ricky. Afterwards a doctor tells Lucy she is suffering from malnutrition and has to stay in bed for three weeks Marco Rizo as Piano Player. Songs: Desi sings "Cuban Pete". Lucy sings "Sally Sweet".
4	4	"Lucy Thinks Ricky Is Trying to Murder Her"	Marc Daniels	Jess Oppenheimer, Madelyn Pugh and Bob Carroll, Jr.	September 8, 1951	November 5, 1951
Lucy is reading a murder mystery novel. Ricky jokes about a husband murdering his wife. The next morning Ethel comes by and tells Lucy she learned how to tell someone's fortune with a deck of cards. Ethel predicts Lucy's death in the near future. Ricky's agent Jerry (Jerry Hausner) calls him. Lucy overhears Ricky say that he's going to get rid of "her". Ricky is actually talking about one of the singers in his show. Ricky also mentions a gun, which is a prop for the show. Later, Ricky comes home and Lucy hops around to be a moving target. Ricky tells Fred that Lucy is acting crazy. Fred tells Ricky to give Lucy a mild sedative. Lucy sees Ricky drop the pill in a drink. When Lucy switches the glasses, Ricky switches them back. Lucy passes out and Ricky leaves. Ethel thinks Lucy is dead. Ethel is startled when Lucy wakes up. Lucy learns there was no murder plot.
5	5	"The Quiz Show"	Marc Daniels	Jess Oppenheimer, Madelyn Pugh and Bob Carroll, Jr.	October 5, 1951	November 12, 1951
Lucy realizes she has no money to pay any bills. Ricky makes good money and doesn't understand where it's going. He decides to cut off Lucy's allowance and charge accounts. Ethel asks Lucy to go with her to a radio quiz show. It's called "Females are Fabulous" and it's hosted by Freddie Fillmore. When Lucy learns the first prize is $1,000, she agrees to go. To win the first prize, Lucy must introduce a stranger to Ricky as her "long lost first husband". Freddie will send a man to her house that evening. Later, Freddie gives Arnold (Philip Ober) Lucy's address. Lucy mistakes a tramp named Harold (John Emery) for the man. Harold plays along with Lucy's story. Ricky doesn't believe it. Ethel tells Lucy that Harold is a tramp and he came to her door earlier. Harold leaves and Ricky wants an explanation. Arnold arrives and Lucy tells Ricky about the quiz show. Even though Lucy manages to win, the prize money is just enough to pay off her debts. Notes: William Frawley does not appear in this episode. Frank Nelson makes the first of eleven appearances on the show, three times as game show emcee "Freddie Fillmore".
6	6	"The Audition"	Marc Daniels	Jess Oppenheimer, Madelyn Pugh and Bob Carroll, Jr.	October 12, 1951	November 19, 1951
Lucy asks Ricky when he's doing his TV audition. She thinks he should have a pretty girl in the audition, hinting she could do it. Ricky says he doesn't want a wife who is in show business. Ricky gets a telegram saying the audition is tonight. Ricky doesn't want Lucy to find out. To keep Lucy busy, Ricky wants her to take their wills downtown to have the lawyer sign them. Ricky is at the club rehearsing. Buffo the Clown is riding around on his bicycle. The brakes lock and he is thrown off and gets hurt. Ricky has Fred take Buffo to Ricky's place to rest. Lucy learns from Buffo about the audition. Buffo suggests she take his place. That night Ricky and the orchestra are performing for the sponsors. Lucy's hobo act is so comical she ends up with the contract Ricky wanted. She decides she is better off as Ricky's wife. Jess Oppenheimer as Network Sponsor #1. Harry Ackerman as Network Sponsor #2. Song: Desi sings "Babalú". Notes: This is a remake of the original unaired pilot. Vivian Vance does not appear in this episode.
7	7	"The Séance"	Marc Daniels	Jess Oppenheimer, Madelyn Pugh and Bob Carroll, Jr.	October 19, 1951	November 26, 1951
Lucy is studying numerology and astrology. Ricky reminds Lucy that his barber is going to call today. Lucy's hobby almost destroys Ricky's career, as Lucy tells an important talent agent, Mr. Merriweather (Jay Novello), that Ricky cannot appear in a show because of his horoscope (Lucy thought she was telling the barber to cancel Ricky's haircut). Hoping to straighten things out, Ricky takes Lucy to see Merriweather. They learn that Merriweather is also interested in the occult. Merriweather mentions that he's been trying to contact his beloved Tilly, who he lost three years ago. Believing Tilly was his wife, Lucy invites Merriweather to a séance that evening in their apartment. Lucy tells Ricky that Ethel will pretend to be the medium. That evening Merriweather arrives and Lucy introduces Ethel as Madam Ethel Mertzola. But when both Lucy and Fred pretend to be a spirit, things quickly get confusing. However, they manage to pull it off and Ricky gets the part. They discover Mrs. Merriweather's name was Adelaide. Tilly was his dog.
8	8	"Men Are Messy"	Marc Daniels	Jess Oppenheimer, Madelyn Pugh and Bob Carroll, Jr.	October 25, 1951	December 3, 1951
Lucy has just finished cleaning the apartment. Ricky comes home and makes the place a mess. Tired of Ricky's messy behavior, Lucy divides the apartment in half. He can be messy in his half, but not hers. Kenny, Ricky's agent, calls. Ricky is upset with Kenny because Kenny had promised Ricky would get a spread in a local music magazine, which hasn't happened. Kenny says Ricky will be in next months magazine. Ricky is rehearsing at the club. He dances with Maggie, the cleaning lady. Kenny comes by with Jim White (Harry Shannon), the photographer from the magazine. Jim would like to get some pictures of Ricky's home. Ricky expects Lucy to clean up the whole apartment. Lucy decides to teach Ricky a lesson by making a mess of the whole apartment. When Ricky and Jim arrive, Ricky at first pretends they're in the wrong apartment. But then Lucy comes in the room dressed as a hillbilly. Jim starts taking pictures. Ethel is there pretending to be Grandma. Lucy learns that Jim is not from the music magazine, he's from Look magazine.
9	9	"The Fur Coat"	Marc Daniels	Jess Oppenheimer, Madelyn Pugh and Bob Carroll, Jr.	November 9, 1951	December 10, 1951
Ricky shows Ethel and Fred a mink coat he rented for a dance number at the club. Ethel tries it on. Lucy comes home and thinks Fred bought Ethel a mink. When Ricky says it's not Ethel's, Lucy thinks it is an anniversary present for her. Feeling bad that he forgot their anniversary, Ricky can't bring himself to tell Lucy the truth. Ricky plans to make it look as though it was stolen during the night. Lucy wears it to bed. Ricky then arranges for Fred to pose as a burglar and "steal" it the next night. A problem arises when a real thief (Ben Welden) sneaks into the apartment. The thief is frightened away when Fred puts a ladder up to Ricky's bedroom window. Lucy still has the mink. The next day, Lucy learns the truth about the coat from Ethel. Lucy gets even by destroying a fake fur in front of Ricky. Lucy later admits to Ethel that she lied about it being her anniversary to get the fur.
10	10	"Lucy Is Jealous of Girl Singer"	Marc Daniels	Jess Oppenheimer, Madelyn Pugh and Bob Carroll, Jr.	November 16, 1951	December 17, 1951
Ethel tells Lucy that Ricky is running around with another woman. Ethel shows Lucy the gossip column in today's paper that links Ricky with Rosemary, a new dancer at the club. Lucy says it's just a publicity story that Ricky's agent put in. Lucy does confront Ricky about Rosemary. He says there's nothing to it. Ricky is at rehearsal at the Tropicana. He accidentally tears off a lacy piece of Rosemary's dress. Ricky says he'll have it fixed and has Rosemary put the piece in his coat pocket. At home, Lucy finds the piece and Ricky tries to explain. Ricky tells her to come to the club to see for herself. Ethel tells Lucy if she goes to the club, Ricky will just be on his good behavior. That night, Lucy disguises herself as one of the dancers in the show. She really messes the dance number up. Back at home, and knowing it was Lucy, Ricky teases her about it. Song: Desi sings "Jezebel". Notes: William Frawley does not appear in this episode. In an earlier version of the script Rosemary was a singer, not a dancer, hence the episode's title.
11	11	"Drafted"	Marc Daniels	Jess Oppenheimer, Madelyn Pugh and Bob Carroll, Jr.	November 2, 1951	December 24, 1951
Ricky receives a letter from the War Department. Lucy opens it and it tells Ricky to appear at local Army base Fort Dix. Lucy is convinced that he has been drafted. Ricky tells Fred that he's going to Fort Dix to appear in a show. Ricky asks Fred to join him. Ricky tells Fred to not mention it to Ethel. Lucy will want to be part of the show. Ethel tells Lucy that she thinks Fred enlisted in the Army. Ricky tells Fred that Lucy has been acting strange. Because the wives are knitting little things, Ricky and Fred now believe the girls are pregnant. The men decide to throw a baby shower before they go to Fort Dix. Meanwhile, the girls decide to throw a surprise going away party for the guys. It's the night of both parties and each group of guests start arriving. When they try to hide them it leads to a hall closet overflowing with guests. The misunderstandings finally come to light. They then get the guests out of the closet. Note: A short Christmas tagline segment was filmed that aired immediately after this episode that included the four main characters, dressed as Santa Claus, prancing around a Christmas tree in the Ricardos' living room before a fifth Santa appears and disappears.
12	12	"The Adagio"	Marc Daniels	Jess Oppenheimer, Madelyn Pugh and Bob Carroll, Jr.	November 23, 1951	December 31, 1951
Ricky needs a dancer for the Parisian Apache dance number. Lucy wants to do it, but Ricky says no. Lucy needs a partner to learn the dance. Ethel suggests that Lucy dance with Fred. Things do not go well. Ethel then says that the owner of the French laundry has a nephew who just arrived from France. His name is Jean Valjean Raymond (Shepard Menken) and he knows the dance. Jean arrives and immediately starts flirting with Lucy. Ethel comes by and says Ricky is on his way up. Lucy hides Jean. Ricky just came by for some music and leaves. Jean starts flirting with Lucy again and she sends him away. That night Lucy sees Jean outside her bedroom window. Ricky catches Jean and asks him what he's doing there. Jean says he came to elope with Lucy. Jean challenges Ricky to a duel. When Ricky accepts, Jean backs down. Jean only flirted with Lucy because he thought American women expected it. He has a wife and five children. Jean and Ricky find a way to teach Lucy a lesson.
13	13	"The Benefit"	Marc Daniels	Jess Oppenheimer, Madelyn Pugh and Bob Carroll, Jr.	November 30, 1951	January 7, 1952
The Ricardo's and the Mertz's are playing cards. Lucy tries singing with the others, but she is way off key. Ethel tells Lucy that her Women's Club would like to have Ricky sing at a benefit they're giving. Lucy thinks she can talk Ricky into it, but she'd like to perform as well. Ricky reluctantly agrees to do it. The next night Lucy and Ricky rehearse a song. Lucy's not happy that she doesn't have much of a part. The day of the show Lucy tells Ethel that Ricky won't perform but she's still available. Lucy won't sing. Lucy and Ethel think about doing something with a horse costume. Fred comes by and says that Ricky will now perform with Lucy. They'll sing and tell jokes. During the show, Lucy winds up stealing many of Ricky's lines. Songs: Desi, William, Vivian, and Lucy sing "Shine On, Harvest Moon". Desi and Lucy sing "Auf Wiedersehen, My Dear" and "Under the Bamboo Tree". Note: This episode was edited together with the episodes "Breaking the Lease" and "The Ballet", along with twenty minutes of new footage to create the unreleased I Love Lucy movie in 1953.
14	14	"The Amateur Hour"	Marc Daniels	Jess Oppenheimer, Madelyn Pugh and Bob Carroll, Jr.	December 7, 1951	January 14, 1952
Lucy buys a new dress on sale and needs to get Ricky to agree to let her keep it. When Ricky comes home, Lucy is extra nice and flatters him. Ricky knows something is up. Lucy shows him the dress and Ricky says he's not paying for it. Lucy says she'll get a job. The next morning, Lucy can't find a job in the paper. Lucy then sees a job as a babysitter and she's surprised it pays $5 an hour. Lucy calls and sets things up. That afternoon, Mrs. Hudson comes by with little Jimmy. Mrs. Hudson says that they're going to be in an amateur contest her club is giving. While Lucy is in the kitchen with Jimmy, Mrs. Hudson sneaks in twin brother Timmy (David Stollery). Because the boys keep going in separate rooms, Lucy doesn't at first notice there are two of them. When she does find out, together they are very obnoxious. Mrs. Hudson calls and asks Lucy if she could perform with the boys at the contest. If they win, Lucy can keep the $100 prize. Ricky is hosting the contest. Lucy and the boys win. Ricky realizes it's Lucy and not Mrs. Hudson. Songs: Desi sings "I'm Breaking My Back Putting Up a Front for You". Lucy, Sammy Ogg and David Stollery sing "Ragtime Cowboy Joe". Note: William Frawley does not appear in this episode.
15	15	"Lucy Plays Cupid"	Marc Daniels	Jess Oppenheimer, Madelyn Pugh and Bob Carroll, Jr.	December 13, 1951	January 21, 1952
Lucy's neighbor, Miss Lewis (Bea Benaderet), has a crush on Mr. Ritter (Edward Everett Horton), the grocer. She would like to have him to dinner and asks Lucy to give him the invite. Ricky wants Lucy to stay out of it. Lucy drops a hint to Mr. Ritter that someone really likes him. Mr. Ritter thinks it's Lucy who is fond of him. Mr. Ritter agrees to come to Lucy's apartment for dinner. Lucy tells Miss Lewis that she'll try to get Mr. Ritter uninterested in her. That night, Lucy dresses very shabbily and serves Mr. Ritter a horrible meal. Knowing that he doesn't like children, Lucy has some kids in the apartment. Miss Lewis tells Ricky about the misunderstanding and that Mr. Ritter thinks Lucy is in love with him. Ricky thinks it's funny. Mr. Ritter tells Lucy he's willing to over look her faults. Ricky plays along and tells Mr. Ritter he can have Lucy. Miss Lewis comes by and starts chasing Mr. Ritter around the apartment. Mr. Ritter leaves with Miss Lewis. Note: Neither Vivian Vance nor William Frawley appear in this episode. Benaderet was one of the original choices to play Ethel Mertz but was unavailable.
16	16	"Lucy Fakes Illness"	Marc Daniels	Jess Oppenheimer, Madelyn Pugh and Bob Carroll, Jr.	December 18, 1951	January 28, 1952
Ethel and Fred tell Lucy that Ricky put an ad in Variety for a new act for his show. Ethel, Fred and Lucy want to be in the show. Ricky agrees to let Fred and Ethel audition, but not Lucy. Lucy gets a book from the library on abnormal psychology. Later when Ricky comes home, Lucy pretends to be Tallulah Bankhead. She then pretends to have amnesia and then acts like a little child. Ricky is getting really worried. Fred tells Ricky that Lucy is faking it. Ricky is going to get even. He calls his friend Hal March. Ricky wants Hal to pretend to be a doctor, examine Lucy and tell her she really does have a rare disease. When Ricky tells Lucy he was going to give her a part in his show, she suddenly acts normal. Ricky says he still wants to have her checked out and brings in Hal, who has a fake beard and mustache. Hal tells Lucy she has a rare disease and he may have to operate. Hopefully she won't turn green, because if she does, she will be gone soon. While she was asleep, Ricky put a green light bulb in the lamp. Lucy panics when she thinks she's green. Ricky confesses it was all a trick.
17	17	"Lucy Writes a Play"	Marc Daniels	Jess Oppenheimer, Madelyn Pugh and Bob Carroll, Jr.	December 22, 1951	February 4, 1952
The Women's Clubs in town are having a play writing contest. Lucy has just finished writing hers. Ethel comes by wearing a Spanish outfit. The play is set in Cuba. Lucy and Ethel rehearse a little. Lucy has Ricky in mind for the star, but he's not interested. Ethel says that Fred will do it, but Lucy doesn't think he can pull off being a Spaniard. She needs it to be realistic because movie producer Darryl B. Mayer will be judging the plays. She changes her play from Cuba to England and she'll use Fred. When Ricky learns that Darryl B. Mayer will be the judge, he talks Fred into letting him play the part. He wants to surprise Lucy, so Fred shouldn't say anything. Ricky shows up to the play in a Spanish outfit because he's using the old script. Lucy at first accuses Ricky of trying to ruin her play. Lucy decides to quickly revert back to the old script to solve the problem. But by the time Ricky comes back on stage, he has the new script.
18	18	"Breaking the Lease"	Marc Daniels	Jess Oppenheimer, Madelyn Pugh and Bob Carroll, Jr.	January 5, 1952	February 11, 1952
The Mertzes are having a fun evening with the Ricardos. Lucy is worried as it's very late in the evening. Fred and Ethel go back downstairs to their own apartment. Lucy and Ricky continue singing loudly. Suddenly there's a banging from downstairs. Ethel calls and tells Lucy to stop the singing. When Lucy and Ricky keep opening and closing the bedroom window, Fred calls and says stop making so much noise. Ricky makes some more noise when he tries to fix a leaky pipe. This leads to a feud between the couples, with the Ricardos saying they'll move out. The next day, Ethel tells Lucy she wants a check for five months rent to pay off the lease. Ricky wants to break the lease. They start making a lot of noise. Ricky has his band rehearse in the apartment. People start showing up to the rehearsal because the Mertzes sold tickets to people out in the street. Ethel and Fred give Lucy and Ricky their lease. On the day the Ricardos were to move out, the two couples reconcile. Barbara Pepper as Party Guest. Songs: Lucy, Desi, Vivian and William sing "I Want a Girl (Just Like the Girl That Married Dear Old Dad)" and "Sweet Sue, Just You". Desi sings "El Cumbanchero". Note: I Love Lucy was briefly a radio program and this episode, retitled "The Lease Breakers," was broadcast on CBS Radio on February 27, 1952. This episode was edited together with the episodes "The Benefit" and "The Ballet" to create the unreleased I Love Lucy movie.
19	19	"The Ballet"	Marc Daniels	Jess Oppenheimer, Madelyn Pugh and Bob Carroll, Jr.	January 11, 1952	February 18, 1952
Ricky says he can't go to the picture with Fred and Ethel because he's having trouble with his new show. Ricky needs a Ballet dancer and a pair of burlesque comics. Lucy wants to be the dancer, but Ricky says no. Fred says he could be the burlesque comic. Lucy dances for Ricky and he is unimpressed. Lucy goes to see Madame Lamond (Mary Wickes), the ballet teacher. Lucy does not do well in class. Lucy tells Ethel that she is having a Burlesque Comic (Frank J. Scannell) come over to teach her an act. The Comic wants to teach her the routine "Slowly I Turned". That doesn't go well either. Ethel calls and tells Lucy that Ricky hired the comics. Ethel and Fred go to the opening night of Ricky's new show. Fred learns that one of the ballet dancers took sick. Ethel tells Lucy and she should come by right away. Instead of a ballet outfit, Lucy shows up in a burlesque costume. Lucy adds burlesque stunts to the ballet dance number. Back at home, Ricky finds a way to get back at Lucy. Song: Desi sings "Martha". Note: This episode was edited together with the episodes "The Benefit" and "Breaking the Lease" to create the unreleased I Love Lucy movie.
20	20	"The Young Fans"	Marc Daniels	Jess Oppenheimer, Madelyn Pugh and Bob Carroll, Jr.	January 18, 1952	February 25, 1952
Ricky tells Lucy that teenager Peggy Dawson (Janet Waldo) has a crush on him and is following him everywhere. Peggy sneaks into the kitchen where Ricky is. Lucy teases Ricky about it. Ricky wants Lucy to talk to Peggy. Lucy asks Peggy about boys her age. Peggy does mention Arthur Morton (Richard Crenna). Peggy says that Arthur is too shy to ask her to the school dance. Peggy also says that Arthur doesn't know how to dance. Lucy agrees to teach Arthur how to dance and has him come over. Arthur develops a crush on Lucy. Ricky thinks it's funny that Arthur told Lucy he loves her. Peggy calls and tells Lucy she's coming for Ricky because Lucy stole Arthur. Arthur calls and tells Ricky he wants to have a man to man talk with him about Lucy. Ricky and Lucy make themselves look very old. Peggy comes by and is stunned when she sees old Ricky in a wheelchair. Arthur arrives. When he sees Lucy, he and Peggy run off together. Note: Neither Vivian Vance nor William Frawley appear in this episode.
21	21	"New Neighbors"	Marc Daniels	Jess Oppenheimer, Madelyn Pugh and Bob Carroll, Jr.	January 25, 1952	March 3, 1952
Lucy and Ethel are watching the new tenants moving in. Tom O'Brien (Hayden Rorke) and his wife (K.T. Stevens) are actors and are rehearsing a scene for a show. After they leave for lunch, Ethel and Lucy snoop around their apartment. When they hear Ricky coming, Lucy hides in the closet. Ethel leaves with Ricky and the O'Briens return. The O'Briens continue rehearsing. Lucy overhears the couple talking about murdering her and Ricky, stealing their identities, and then blowing up the Capitol. Lucy manages to get out of the apartment unnoticed. Lucy tells Ricky and the Mertzes what she heard. Lucy calls the police and speaks with Sergeant Morton (Allen Jenkins). Morton doesn't believe Lucy either. Ricky and Fred were listening to the O'Briens through a furnace pipe and now believe Lucy. They turn the Ricardo's apartment into a war bunker and have shotguns. The doorbell rings and they shoot out the front door. It turns out to be Sergeant Morton and they get arrested. In jail the next morning, Morton tells them the O'Briens are actors and are moving out.
22	22	"Fred and Ethel Fight"	Marc Daniels	Jess Oppenheimer, Madelyn Pugh and Bob Carroll, Jr.	January 30, 1952	March 10, 1952
The Mertzes have a fight and aren't speaking to each other. Lucy tries to patch things up. She's invited both to dinner without them knowing the other is coming. When they see each other, Fred and Ethel are about to leave. But then they see the food and decide to stay. It takes a little doing, but Fred and Ethel make up. Lucy and Ricky then get into a fight and Ricky leaves. The next day Ethel hopes to play on Ricky's sympathies. She'll bandage Lucy up and say she was hit by a bus. Meanwhile Fred and Ricky plot an elaborate setup where they fake a fire in the apartment from which Ricky appears to save Lucy. The plan backfires when the fake fire is so convincing that Lucy ends up jumping out the window to escape from it. Lucy and Ricky ultimately reconcile, but the Mertzes have another fight when Ethel discovers Fred's role in the scheme.
23	23	"The Moustache"	Marc Daniels	Jess Oppenheimer, Madelyn Pugh and Bob Carroll, Jr.	February 8, 1952	March 17, 1952
Ricky is growing a mustache and Lucy doesn't like it. Ricky is doing it to hopefully get a part in a movie. Lucy tells Ethel that she'll glue on a false mustache and won't take it off until Ricky shaves his. When Ricky gets home, Lucy has on a long white beard and mustache. Ricky shaves off his mustache, but Lucy can't get the beard off. Turns out that Fred glued the beard on her with what he thought was spirit gum, but it was really Bulldog Cement. Ricky calls the drug store and learns they don't make the cement remover anymore. Lucy dresses as a man so people won't laugh at her. Fred found a drug store in Chicago that had the remover. They will send it air mail. Ricky tells Lucy that Mr. Murdoch (John Brown), a Hollywood talent scout, is coming by that night. Fred and Ethel come by hoping to audition for Murdoch, but he's not interested. Lucy trims the beard shorter and hides it with the veil of a belly dancer costume. Ricky takes the veil off Lucy. Lucy finally gets rid of the beard and she and Ricky both get roles in the same movie. When Lucy discovers she is being cast as Ricky's father, she refuses the part. Song: Desi sings "I'll See You in C-U-B-A".
24	24	"The Gossip"	Marc Daniels	Jess Oppenheimer, Madelyn Pugh and Bob Carroll, Jr.	February 15, 1952	March 24, 1952
Ricky gives Lucy a hard time about gossiping with Marge. Lucy finds a way for Ethel to know the gossip from Marge without actually telling her. Lucy says that men gossip also. Lucy and Ethel make a bet with Ricky and Fred to see which pair can go longer without gossiping. The loser serves the winner breakfast in bed for a month. Ricky comes up with the idea that he and Fred will pretend to be talking in their sleep. They will plant a phony story that will be too juicy for the wives to not gossip about. It will be about tenant Grace Foster and the Milkman (Bob Jellison). The men put their plan into action. They then overhear the wives talk about Grace and the Milkman. The men say the wives lost the bet. Lucy then realizes that the men were awake when they told the story and they actually gossiped first. But the men say they made up the story so it wasn't them gossiping. The Milkman comes in the apartment looking for a place to hide. Bill Foster (Richard Reeves ) comes after him because the Milkman was flirting with Grace. Lucy and Ethel wind up winning the bet. What Ricky and Fred don't know is that Lucy paid Bill and the Milkman for their performance.
25	25	"Pioneer Women"	Marc Daniels	Jess Oppenheimer, Madelyn Pugh and Bob Carroll, Jr.	February 22, 1952	March 31, 1952
Lucy and Ethel hope to join The Society Matrons League, an elite women's club. They ask Ricky and Fred for electric dishwashers, but the men refuse. The men think their wives are spoiled. This leads to Ricky and Fred betting Lucy and Ethel that they cannot live without modern conveniences. The men will do the same. Ethel tried churning butter, but will need Lucy's help. Lucy tries to bake bread. Lucy gets a telegram that her and Ethel are invited to a tea at the women's club. Lucy winds up creating an 18-foot loaf of homemade bread. The girls hope to win the bet by making the men wear old fashioned clothes. The men have no problem wearing the old clothes. Mrs. Pettebone (Florence Bates) and Mrs. Pomerantz, from the club, come by. They are making a surprise inspection. Ricky wants to help Lucy, so he tells Mrs. Pettebone they are dressed this way because they are rehearsing an act for his club. When Mrs. Pettebone says they will make an allowance for show people, Lucy says they don't want to join their phony club. Ricky is proud of Lucy and calls off the bet. Songs: Desi performs "Pagliacci". Desi and William sing "While Strolling Through the Park One Day". Note: This episode was colorized and aired on CBS on December 14, 2018.
26	26	"The Marriage License"	Marc Daniels	Jess Oppenheimer, Madelyn Pugh and Bob Carroll, Jr.	February 28, 1952	April 7, 1952
Lucy is cleaning out the desk and Ethel comes by. Lucy finds her marriage license. She notices a spelling error in Ricky's name and is not sure if she and Ricky are legally married. She shows it to Ricky and he thinks she's overreacting. Lucy calls city hall and they want to see the license. Fred tells Ricky he has a friend in the license bureau. Ricky wants to pull a prank on Lucy. Fred will tell his friend to tell Lucy the license is invalid and she's not legally married. Lucy comes home and says they need to get remarried. She wants to do everything exactly as they did it the first time from the proposal on. They go to the forest in Connecticut where Ricky proposed. They get into a little argument. Ricky runs out of gas by a hotel. They ask the owner, Mr. Willoughby (Irving Bacon), about a gas station. Mr. Willoughby says that gas will arrive tomorrow. Lucy makes sure they have separate rooms. Ricky tells her about the prank he pulled, but Lucy doesn't believe him. Some more problems arise because Ricky doesn't have his wallet and has no money. Ricky finally proposes. Mrs. Willoughby (Elizabeth Patterson) makes out the wedding license. Mr. Willoughby is also a justice of the peace and he marries Ricky and Lucy. Song: Elizabeth Patterson sings "I Love You Truly".
27	27	"The Kleptomaniac"	Marc Daniels	Jess Oppenheimer, Madelyn Pugh and Bob Carroll, Jr.	March 7, 1952	April 14, 1952
Ethel gives Lucy some money that the Club Treasurer gave her for the charity bazaar. She's to use it to rent the hall and buy refreshments. Lucy is the Chairman of the bazaar, but she doesn't want Ricky to know. Lucy's been hiding all the donated items for the bazaar in a locked closet. Ricky finds the $200 and asks Lucy where she got it. Lucy jokes and says she stole it. Later that day, Ricky sees Lucy sneak in several expensive looking items. Ethel agrees to say the money is hers if Lucy finds a way to get rid of Fred's cuckoo clock. Ricky tells Fred that he thinks Lucy is a kleptomaniac. Ricky and Fred see Lucy take the cuckoo clock. Ethel tells Lucy that the men saw her take the clock and Ricky saw her with the other items. They think she's a kleptomaniac. Ethel says Ricky called a psychiatrist and he's bringing him over tonight. Lucy will get back at Ricky by pretending her and Ethel are crooks. Ricky comes home with Dr. Tom Robinson (Joseph Kearns). They find jewelry and other items laying around. Lucy and Ethel come in dressed as hoodlums and carrying guns. They claim they robbed a gas station. Tom tries to hypnotize Lucy and she plays along. Lucy brings in a baby elephant she claims she stole from a circus.
28	28	"Cuban Pals"	Marc Daniels	Jess Oppenheimer, Madelyn Pugh and Bob Carroll, Jr.	March 14, 1952	April 21, 1952
Lucy tells Ethel that some of Ricky's friends from Cuba are coming for a visit. They're a dance troupe that Ricky booked into the club. Ricky brings home Carlos and Maria. Lucy strikes up a conversation with them and then learns they don't speak English. Ricky tells Lucy that Renita Perez (Lita Baron) is also coming by. She was a little girl he used to dance with in Havana. Her partner hasn't arrived yet so Carlos asked if Ricky could dance with her at the club. Lucy thinks it's a great idea, until Renita arrives and she a grown up beautiful woman. Later, Fred and Ethel come by to get the rent. Lucy tells them about beautiful Renita. Fred suggests dressing as scrub women and go to the club to spy on Ricky and Renita. Lucy and Ethel are at the club and watch Ricky and Renita do a dance number together. Lucy tells Ethel that she intends to do the dance number with Ricky. She has Fred find a way to keep Renita away from the club. Lucy takes Renita's place at the club, but Ricky switches numbers when Renita's real dance partner Ramon shows up to do a voodoo number. Songs: Desi and Lita Baron perform "The Lady in Red". Desi sings "Similau".
29	29	"The Freezer"	Marc Daniels	Jess Oppenheimer, Madelyn Pugh and Bob Carroll, Jr.	March 21, 1952	April 28, 1952
Lucy wants to get a home freezer, but Ricky says he can't afford it. Ethel comes by and mentions she also wanted a freezer. Fred says he's doing work on the furance and there won't be any heat for a while. Ethel says her Uncle Oscar is a butcher and they could get a walk-in meat freezer from him for practically nothing. Not knowing how big they really are, Lucy orders two sides of beef. The meat arrives and there's 700 pounds of it, costing $483. They go to a butcher shop and try to sell some of the meat to the customers. The Butcher (Fred Aldrich) sees what they're doing and they leave. They put the meat into the freezer in the basement. Fred spoke to Uncle Oscar and learned about the freezer. He and Ricky are actually happy about it and they bought 30 pounds of meat. While Ethel stalls the men, Lucy goes to move the meat from the freezer to the furnace. Lucy gets locked inside the freezer. After Fred uses a crowbar to open the door, Lucy emerges nearly frozen. When Fred turns on the furnace to try and thaw Lucy out, he ends up cooking all the meat. Frank Sully as Delivery Man. Barbara Pepper as Woman in Butcher Shop. Songs Desi sings "Ay Mama Inés! " and "Cielito Lindo".
30	30	"Lucy Does a TV Commercial"	Marc Daniels	Jess Oppenheimer, Madelyn Pugh and Bob Carroll, Jr.	March 28, 1952	May 5, 1952
Ricky gets a call from Jerry. Lucy learns that Ricky will be doing a television show. Despite being busy with that, Jerry wants Ricky to find a girl to act in a commercial on the show. Lucy immediately volunteers, but Ricky turns her down. Ricky leaves and Fred comes by. Ethel went to see her mother for a couple days. Lucy enlists Fred's help in showing Ricky that she could do the commercial. It doesn't go well and Lucy ruins their TV. Ricky tells Lucy he's already hired another girl. Lucy finds a way to have the girl think Ricky won't be needing her after all. Ross the Director (Ross Elliott) tells his assistant Joe (Jerry Hausner) that he's ready to rehearse the commercial. Lucy goes to the set and ends up in the sponsor's "Vitameatavegamin" health tonic commercial. As the tonic is 23% alcohol, Lucy soon ends up completely drunk. Joe takes her to the dressing room to rest before the show. Later, Joe can't find Lucy and the show is about to start. Drunken Lucy winds up disrupting Ricky's performance. Notes: Vivian Vance does not appear in this episode. In the April 9, 2020 episode of Will & Grace, Debra Messing as Lucy, Matt Cook as the director and Brian Michael Jones as Joe, re-enacted the commercial scene. In 1997, TV Guide ranked this episode #2 on its list of the 100 Greatest Episodes. In 2009, it moved to #4. This episode was colorized and aired on CBS on December 23, 2015.
31	31	"The Publicity Agent"	Marc Daniels	Jess Oppenheimer, Madelyn Pugh and Bob Carroll, Jr.	April 4, 1952	May 12, 1952
Ricky is depressed because he thinks he's not getting enough publicity and his career is going nowhere. Lucy wants to help, but Ricky tells her to stay out of it. After seeing something in the paper, Lucy dreams up a stunt which involves her posing as the "Maharincess of Franistan", who wants to see Ricky sing. Lucy manages to get the story in the paper. Ricky sees the article. He tells Fred he thinks his press agent made up the silly story. After speaking to his press agent, Ricky now thinks the story is true. A Reporter (Peter Leeds) comes to the club. Ricky tells him he's putting on a special show for the Maharincess. Lucy arrives all dressed up and disguised. Ethel is her assistant. The Reporter has a few questions for the Maharincess. Ricky then sings to her and she keeps swooning. Later, Lucy and Ethel are at the hotel. Fred comes by posing as the Chief of Franistan Secret Police. He tells her she is in great danger. Suddenly two men from her country arrive to threaten her. Ricky shows up pretending to be "The Tiger" and he's there to kill her. Ricky reveals himself. He found out about her posing as the Maharincess and pulled this stunt so she wouldn't do it again. Richard Reeves as One of the Men. Songs: Desi sings "Adiós muchachos" and "Babalú".
32	32	"Lucy Gets Ricky on the Radio"	Marc Daniels	Jess Oppenheimer, Madelyn Pugh and Bob Carroll, Jr.	April 11, 1952	May 19, 1952
Fred and Ethel come by to watch some television. Lucy would rather just talk. No one has anything to say. Lucy turns on the TV. They keep adjusting the picture until they break the TV. Lucy brings out a radio. The others are surprised at Ricky's correct answers to a radio quiz show. Lucy and Ethel go to get some sandwiches. Ricky tells Fred that the show was a delayed broadcast and Ricky was at the radio station when the questions were being asked. The next day, Lucy calls Freddy Fillmore (Frank Nelson), the host of the show, and gets her and Ricky on as contestants. Ricky comes home and tells Lucy what he told Fred. Ricky then learns they are to be on the show. Meanwhile, Tommy the Office Boy (Robert Ellis) gives Freddy the questions for the next show. Lucy goes to see Freddy and, without Freddy knowing it, she gets the paper with the answers. On the show, Freddy changes the way the questions are picked. Lucy gives the wrong answers to the first two questions. Ricky wants to answer the third question. Lucy tells him what to say and it's wrong. Ricky somehow answers the jackpot question correctly.
33	33	"Lucy's Schedule"	Marc Daniels	Jess Oppenheimer, Madelyn Pugh and Bob Carroll, Jr.	April 18, 1952	May 26, 1952
Lucy is taking forever to get ready to go to the movies. Ricky tells Fred that he and Lucy are having dinner tomorrow night with his new boss, Alvin Littlefield (Gale Gordon). Littlefield bought the night club. The next night, a time saving stunt of Lucy's goes wrong and they are very late getting to the Littlefields. When they finally get there, Alvin says they've already eaten. Alvin mentions that he likes punctuality. Back at home, Ricky is putting Lucy on a rigid time schedule. Days later, Alvin is talking to Ricky about possibly managing the club. Alvin is concerned about Ricky being able to do things on time. Ricky tells Alvin that he laid down the law with Lucy. She is sticking to her schedule. To prove it, Ricky invites Alvin and his wife Phoebe (Edith Meiser) to dinner that night. Ethel tells Lucy that she's worried that Fred will put her on a schedule. Phoebe stops by and complains to Lucy about wives being on a schedule. Phoebe says that if Alvin likes what he sees at dinner tonight, he'll put her on a schedule. Lucy comes up with a plan and Phoebe and Ethel will help. That night the wives rush dinner so much that the men don't even get to eat anything. Alvin insists that Ricky get rid of Lucy's schedule and he does make Ricky the manager of the club. Note: Gordon was one of the early choices to play Fred Mertz but was unavailable. He later starred with Lucille Ball in each of her later series.
34	34	"Ricky Thinks He's Getting Bald"	Marc Daniels	Jess Oppenheimer, Madelyn Pugh and Bob Carroll, Jr.	April 25, 1952	June 2, 1952
Lucy is looking in the mirror. She tells Ricky she's getting crows feet. Something Lucy says in passing makes Ricky think his hairline is receding. Then he thinks he's going bald. The next morning Ricky shows up to breakfast wearing a hat. After he leaves, Fred and Ethel show up. Something that Fred says gives Lucy the idea to teach Ricky a lesson by giving him painful scalp treatments. Lucy goes to see Mr. Thurlow (Milton Parsons) at the Hair Growth store. Lucy comes up with the idea to have a party with bald headed men to show Ricky he's fine. Mr. Thurlow brings the men to Lucy's apartment, but she has to pay them. Ricky calls and says he won't be coming home. The next day, Lucy gives Ricky some painful and messy scalp treatments. Her plan backfires when Ricky wants to do the treatments every night so his hair grows in faster.
35	35	"Ricky Asks for a Raise"	Marc Daniels	Jess Oppenheimer, Madelyn Pugh and Bob Carroll, Jr.	May 2, 1952	June 9, 1952
At Lucy's insistence, Ricky attempts to pressure his boss Alvin Littlefield into giving him a raise. Alvin refuses and Ricky says he's quitting. Determined to make things right, Lucy, with Ethel's help, decides to book up every table at the Tropicana to make Ricky appear popular. Fred and Ethel then point out that they need to make it clear that it is Ricky the customers want to see. With the help of Fred's old vaudeville friend and his quick-change cabinet, Lucy, Ethel, and Fred don various disguises. They'll pose as clubgoers who become irate and storm out when they hear Ricky has been let go. They successfully convince Mr. Littlefield to hire Ricky back with a raise. But the plan backfires when Ricky thinks he is so popular he does not need to work for Mr. Littlefield anymore. Maurice Marsac as Maurice, Headwaiter at Tropicana. Note: This was Gordon's final appearance on the series; he would later appear in one episode of The Lucy-Desi Comedy Hour.

=== Season 2 (1952–53) ===
No. overall	No. in season	Title	Directed by	Written by	Film date	Original release date
36	1	"Job Switching"	William Asher	Jess Oppenheimer, Madelyn Pugh and Bob Carroll, Jr.	May 30, 1952	September 15, 1952
Ricky is upset because every month Lucy's checking account is overdrawn. Fred and Ethel come by. Fred complains about how much money Ethel spends. Ricky and Fred think doing housework is much easier than earning money. Lucy and Ethel feel the opposite. So the men will do the housework while the women attempt to earn a living for a week. Lucy is impressed with Ricky's first attempt at breakfast. She then learns that Ricky picked up the breakfast at the drug store. Lucy and Ethel go to see Mr. Snodgrass at the employment agency. They get a job at a candy factory. The Candy Factory Foreman (Elvia Allman) shows them what they will be doing. While trying to prepare dinner, Ricky and Fred make a huge mess in the Ricardo's kitchen. Lucy and Ethel find themselves fighting against a speedy conveyor belt of chocolates that they have to wrap. The four decide to go back to the way things were. Notes: In 1996, TV Guide included this episode as part of its "100 Most Memorable Moments in TV History", ranking it #2. Note: The episode "I Love Sushi" which aired on November 26, 2006 in the Nickelodeon TV series Drake & Josh is an homage to this episode. In addition, the name of the factory in said episode "Ball & Vance Fish Corporation", references to both Lucille Ball and Vivian Vance, and the episode's end credits being styled in the same manner. In the 2013 Paley Center for Media television special TV's Funniest of the Funniest, the candy factory scene was ranked first among the 30 funniest moments in TV history, with only one moment eligible per TV series. In the April 9, 2020 episode of Will & Grace, Sean Hayes as Lucy, Debra Messing as Ethel, and Lucie Arnaz as their boss re-enact the chocolate factory scene. This episode was colorized and first aired on CBS on December 7, 2014.
37	2	"The Saxophone"	William Asher	Jess Oppenheimer, Madelyn Pugh and Bob Carroll, Jr.	June 6, 1952	September 22, 1952
Lucy tells Ethel that Ricky's taking the band on a series of one-night engagements for three weeks. Despite Ricky not asking her, Lucy plans to go with. Lucy finds a saxophone she pretended to play in her high school band. She can only play one song, "The Glow-Worm". Ricky tells Lucy she can't go with on the tour. Ricky needs a saxophone player and Lucy wants to audition. Lucy gets advice from Fred on how to be a "hep cat" musician. Lucy goes to the audition, but Ricky tells her he wants her to stay home. Lucy wants to make it look as though it isn't safe to leave her alone at home, as there could be other men after her. Thanks to Fred, Ricky sees through Lucy's plan. Ricky calls Jule (Herb Vigran) at the musicians union. He wants Jule to send over several guys that will pretend to be Lucy's lovers. When Lucy sees the men, she goes running out of the apartment. After finding out who the men really were, Lucy gets Jule to call Ricky and say he couldn't find anyone to send over. Marco Rizo as Marco.
38	3	"The Anniversary Present"	Marc Daniels	Jess Oppenheimer, Madelyn Pugh and Bob Carroll, Jr.	May 9, 1952	September 29, 1952
Ricky calls neighbor Grace Foster (Gloria Blondell) and says that his and Lucy's anniversary is coming up. He would like to buy Lucy some real pearls. As Grace works at a jewelry company, he was hoping she could get him a discount. Lucy tells Ethel that she left clues around the house to remind Ricky about their anniversary. Later, Ethel tells Lucy she saw Ricky come out of Grace's apartment. Lucy thinks the worst. Ricky is rehearsing with the band. Jule tells Ricky that Grace called and he should go by her apartment that night. Ricky says it's strictly business. Lucy eavesdrops on Grace's call to Ricky and thinks they are having an affair. Lucy and Ethel try to catch Ricky in the act by posing as painters. They end up getting stuck on the scaffold outside Grace's window. Lucy winds up covered in paint. Ricky and Fred pull the wives off the scaffold. Everything gets straightened out and Lucy is delighted that Ricky remembered their anniversary. Barbara Pepper as Voice of the Woman in 4B. Richard Reeves as Voice of Albert, the Man in 4B. Song: Desi sings "Down Argentine Way".
39	4	"The Handcuffs"	Marc Daniels	Jess Oppenheimer, Madelyn Pugh and Bob Carroll, Jr.	May 16, 1952	October 6, 1952
Fred is performing some magic tricks for Lucy, Ethel and Ricky. They are not amused. Lucy ruins a trick of Fred's that involved handcuffs. Ricky tells Lucy that he has a rehearsal for a TV show coming up. Later, Lucy plays a practical joke on Ricky and locks the two of them together with Fred's handcuffs. The handcuffs don't come apart the way they did earlier. Fred and Ethel come by. Turns out the handcuffs that Lucy took were actual Civil War handcuffs and not the trick ones. Fred doesn't have keys for them. Lucy and Ricky have a hard time trying to get some sleep. The next morning Ethel brings by Mr. Walters (Will Wright), a locksmith. Mr. Walters recognizes Ricky and would like his autograph for his wife. The keys he brought with don't work. Ricky has to take Lucy with to the TV appearance. Ricky's agent, Jerry (Paul Dubov), says he'll have to perform with Lucy. The Emcee (Veola Vonn) introduces Ricky to the audience and Lucy stays behind a curtain. Mr. Walters shows up with a key that works. Song: Desi sings "In Santiago, Chile".
40	5	"The Operetta"	Marc Daniels	Jess Oppenheimer, Madelyn Pugh and Bob Carroll, Jr.	May 23, 1952	October 13, 1952
Lucy has a Womans Club meeting at her apartment. Lucy tells Ethel that the club decided to put on an operetta and Lucy's in charge. Because of some borrowing Lucy did, there's no money in the club treasury. They can save money if they write the operetta themselves. Lucy writes the operetta and pays for the costumes and scenery with a post-dated check. The operetta is going well. Because she can't carry a tune, whenever Lucy tries to sing, all the other ladies sing over her. Because the check bounced, the costumes and scenery are repossessed in the middle of the show. Betty Jaynes as Singer in Operetta. Songs: Betty Jaynes sings "The Pleasant Peasant Girls". William sings "The Good Squire Quinn". Vivian sings "Lily of the Valley". Lucy and Betty sing "Queen of the Gypsies". Desi, Lucy, William, Vivian, Myra Marsh and Betty Jaynes sing "The Troops of the King". Desi sings "The Good Prince Lancelot".
41	6	"Vacation from Marriage"	William Asher	Jess Oppenheimer, Madelyn Pugh and Bob Carroll, Jr.	August 1, 1952	October 27, 1952
Lucy and Ethel agree that their marriages are in a rut. That night the wives tell Ricky and Fred that their lives have become a stale routine. Lucy says she did some research at the library. She found a book that said couples should take some time away from each other. Lucy will move in with Ethel and Fred will move in with Ricky. They won't see each other for a week. After several days, Lucy and Ethel grow tired of living together. They will attempt to make Ricky and Fred jealous by pretending that they have dates. Meanwhile, Ricky and Fred admit to each other that they miss their wives. The wives tell the men they are going out to a club. The men claim they have dates as well. Lucy tells Ethel that she thinks the men made up having dates. Lucy wants to sneak up to her apartment and try to see if the men are there. Ricky suggests to Fred that they sneak down to his apartment to see if the wives are there. The wives at first don't see the men, but then they hear them coming up from downstairs. Thinking the wives are out, the men decide to wait up for them. The wives wind up locked on the cold roof in their night clothes. The men find the wives on the roof and pull a prank on them. They all agree they'd rather be in a rut with each other.
42	7	"The Courtroom"	William Asher	Jess Oppenheimer, Madelyn Pugh and Bob Carroll, Jr.	August 8, 1952	November 10, 1952
The Ricardos buy the Mertzes a new television set for their 25th wedding anniversary. Lucy had it delivered to her apartment. Now her and Ricky have to carry it down to the Mertzes place. When Ricky tries hooking it up, the TV explodes. Ricky and Fred get into an argument. In retaliation, Fred runs up to the Ricardo's apartment and kicks in the glass of their TV. Now they claim they will sue each other. The next day, a Process Server (Harry Bartell) tricks Ricky into signing a summons by pretending he wants Ricky's autograph. Ricky says they don't need a lawyer, he'll handle it. Ricky has Lucy practice her testimony. In court, Lucy repeats her rehearsed testimony and compliments the Judge (Moroni Olsen). Ethel then testifies with her exaggerated made up story. Because of the discrepancies, the Judge wants them to reenact the scene. The Judge reminds them about the penalty for perjury. Lucy and Ethel start telling the truth and the four get into an argument. The Judge has the Bailiff (Robert B. Williams) take them into another room where they are to apologize to each other. They become friends again.
43	8	"Redecorating"	William Asher	Jess Oppenheimer, Madelyn Pugh and Bob Carroll, Jr.	August 15, 1952	November 24, 1952
Ricky tells Fred that the wives went to a Home Show. He also mentions that he got four tickets to the opening night of the new Rodgers and Hammerstein musical. The women come home and complain about their old furniture. Lucy says that her and Ethel entered a contest at the Home Show. The winner gets five rooms of new furniture. Lucy is determined to stay by the phone so she does not miss receiving the call that she won. In order to get her out of the house, Ricky decides to fool Lucy into thinking she has won. He asks Fred to call her posing as a representative from the contest. Ricky's plan backfires when Lucy sells all of their old furniture to second-hand man Dan Jenkins (Hans Conried) for $75. With the money she got for the furniture, Lucy will re-paint and paper the apartment. Lucy and Ethel will do the work, but it doesn't go well. Dan comes by to pick up the furniture, but Lucy says the new stuff hasn't arrived yet. Ricky comes home and sees all the furniture piled in the living room. Lucy tells him she sold the old furniture. Ricky tells her it was Fred that called her. Dan sells them the furniture back for $395. Ricky then sees the horrible wallpaper job. Fred tells Ricky he lost his nerve and didn't make the call to Lucy. Lucy actually won. Florence Halop as Woman on Phone. Margie Liszt as Woman on Phone.
44	9	"Ricky Loses His Voice"	William Asher	Jess Oppenheimer, Madelyn Pugh and Bob Carroll, Jr.	August 22, 1952	December 1, 1952
Ricky is rehearsing with Marco the piano player. Ricky mentions that his throat is a little sore. Meanwhile, Ethel tells Lucy that her new furniture arrived. Ricky comes home and tells Lucy he isn't feeling well. Ricky tells Fred that he has an opening coming up. He wants to impress Mr. Chambers (Arthur Q. Bryan), the new owner of the Tropicana. Lucy tells Ethel and Fred that the doctor wants Ricky to not talk for a week. Ricky is also to stay in bed. Lucy will go ask Mr. Chambers to stage the show. Mr. Chambers calls and tells Lucy that he'll out of town, but will be back the day before the opening. Lucy decides to stage the show herself and not tell Ricky. Lucy, Ethel and Fred will also be in the show. Fred was able to get some of the chorus girls he used to work with. It's opening night, and because he rested, Ricky is able to sing. Ricky is surprised when he sees the elderly chorus girls. Ricky is even more surprised to see Fred and Ethel performing. Then it's Lucy's turn. The cast and Mr. Chambers dance to "Charleston". Barbara Pepper as Chorus Girl. Gertrude Astor as Chorus Girl. Tony Terran as Trumpeter. Songs: Desi performs "Sweet and Lovely" and "Mexican Giveaway". William and Vivian sing "Carolina in the Morning". Lucy plays the ukelele and sings "Has Anybody Seen My Gal?". Note: Arthur Q. Bryan was one of the many who were the voice of Elmer Fudd.
45	10	"Lucy Is Enceinte"	William Asher	Jess Oppenheimer, Madelyn Pugh and Bob Carroll, Jr.	October 3, 1952	December 8, 1952
Lucy tells Ethel that she has been experiencing weight gain and having low energy. Ethel thinks that she is actually pregnant, but Lucy doubts it. A visit to the doctor confirms Lucy will have a baby. Lucy doesn't want Ethel to say anything to Fred because she hasn't told Ricky yet. Lucy wants to find the right moment. Ricky comes home for lunch and says that everything went wrong at the club. Lucy tries to be romantic and tell Ricky the good news, but she keeps getting interrupted. Ricky has to get back to the club. Fred comes by with some baseball mementos if it's a baby boy. Lucy decides to go to the club, but she gets interrupted there as well. That night Ricky is performing for the audience. Lucy anonymously requests that Ricky perform his song "We're Having A Baby". Ricky gets quite a surprise when he finds out who requested the song. Bess Flowers as Woman at table. Richard Reeves as Lighting man at club. Songs: Desi sings "Granada", "The Lady in Red", "Rock-a-bye Baby" and "We're Having a Baby".
46	11	"Pregnant Women Are Unpredictable"	William Asher	Jess Oppenheimer, Madelyn Pugh and Bob Carroll, Jr.	October 10, 1952	December 15, 1952
Lucy is practicing bathing and diapering a baby using a doll. Ricky and Lucy are having a hard time picking a name for the baby. Ricky decides to make Lucy breakfast in bed. But because he doesn't know what he's doing, Lucy has to keep getting up to help. Fred comes by and tells Ricky that pregnant women are very unpredictable. The breakfast winds up burnt and the kitchen is a complete mess. Ethel offers to help clean up. Lucy then gets depressed thinking that all the special treatment she is getting is only because of the baby. Ricky comes home with a bunch of presents. Ethel is about to tell him what Lucy is thinking, but then Lucy walks in the room. The presents turn out to be things for the baby. Lucy feels even worse now. Ethel talks Ricky into taking Lucy out to dinner. Ricky sends Lucy a corsage and candy. Fred and Ethel join Ricky and Lucy at the club. Everyone is having a very nice time, but then Lucy starts crying. Now Lucy believes that Ricky does not care about the baby anymore. Song: Desi sings "Cheek to Cheek".
47	12	"Lucy's Show Biz Swan Song"	William Asher	Jess Oppenheimer, Madelyn Pugh and Bob Carroll, Jr.	October 17, 1952	December 22, 1952
Ricky would like a Barber Shop Quartet for his Gay Nineties revue. He's a little surprised at what it will cost. Fred and Ethel volunteer to sing and Ricky says they can audition. Lucy wants to be in it as well, but Ricky says no. The next day Lucy tells Ethel she'll audition. Ethel reluctantly agrees to be part of her act. At the club, Pepito the Clown is doing a routine. Jerry (Jerry Hausner) tells Ricky that there is a couple that want to audition. Lucy is wearing a large hoop dress and Ethel is dressed as a man. They do their song. At home, Lucy tells Ethel that Ricky turned them down because she's expecting a baby. Ethel says that Ricky turned her and Fred down as well. Ricky decides that he, Fred and Ethel will be part of the Barber Shop Quartet. The fourth person will be George Watson. It's the night of the show. Ricky, Fred and Ethel are surprised when Lucy is there instead of George. They do what they can to prevent Lucy from singing. Songs: Lucy and Vivian sing "By the Light of the Silvery Moon". Desi, Lucy, William and Vivian sing "Sweet Adeline". William and Vivian sing "Carolina in the Morning".
48	13	"Lucy Hires an English Tutor"	William Asher	Jess Oppenheimer, Madelyn Pugh and Bob Carroll, Jr.	October 24, 1952	December 29, 1952
Lucy is having strange food cravings. Both Ricky and Lucy say they don't care if the baby is a boy or a girl. Lucy finds a box Ricky brought home full of toys for a boy. Ricky then finds Lucy has a box of things for a girl. Lucy starts studying books because she wants to be able to answer any question the baby may ask. Lucy wants her baby to be raised hearing nothing but perfect English diction. Lucy wants to hire a tutor to teach her, Ricky, and the Mertzes. Percy Livermore (Hans Conried) is to arrive soon. Fred comes by dressed as a little boy. Just then Percy shows up. Percy realizes he has quite a challenge ahead of him. Percy turns out to be an aspiring entertainer. He tells Ricky that the deal he made with Lucy is that in lieu of pay, he gets a chance to sing in Ricky's nightclub. Ricky has a plan and it involves Percy losing his perfect English and using slang. Songs: Desi sings "Havana U. Fight Song". William sings "School Days". Hans Conried sings "Tippy Tippy Toe" and "Babalú".
49	14	"Ricky Has Labor Pains"	William Asher	Jess Oppenheimer, Madelyn Pugh and Bob Carroll, Jr.	October 31, 1952	January 5, 1953
Ricky is expecting Fred and a couple of the guys over to watch the ball game. Lucy says they can't come over as some of her friends are giving her a baby shower there. After the baby shower, Lucy and Ethel are going through the gifts. Ricky comes by and asks about dinner, which Lucy hasn't started yet. Fred says there's an article about Ricky in the paper, but it's mostly about Lucy. Lucy isn't able to make dinner and she also didn't pick up Ricky's clothes from the laundry. The next day, Ricky, frustrated and overwhelmed, begins to develop psychosomatic pregnancy symptoms of his own. Dr. Rabwin (Lou Merrill) advises Lucy and Ethel to give Ricky some special attention as a cure. After something that Ethel says, her and Lucy ask Fred to give a men-only "daddy shower" for Ricky. Lucy becomes concerned when Fred calls it a "stag party". Curiosity gets the best of her and she must find a way for her and Ethel to sneak into the event. The daddy shower starts and the men put the presents on a table. The presents are all bottles of beer. Lucy and Ethel arrive dressed as a reporter and photographer. Ricky isn't fooled, but he, Fred and Jerry play along. Ricky finally lets the ladies know he's on to them. Later after Ricky learns that the doctor told the ladies to make him feel better, Ricky starts to get the symptoms again.
50	15	"Lucy Becomes a Sculptress"	William Asher	Jess Oppenheimer, Madelyn Pugh and Bob Carroll, Jr.	November 7, 1952	January 12, 1953
Lucy figures that if the baby wants to be a musician, Ricky can teach him. If the baby wants to be an artist, Lucy will have to learn art. Lucy goes to an art store. The Clerk (Leon Belasco) believes Lucy has the hands of a sculptor. He gives her some clay to work with. The Clerk then has William Abbott (Shepard Menken), the owner, look at her work. Abbott claims Lucy has a great talent and he sells her what she'll need. After she leaves, it's clear that they said all those things just to make a sale. At home, neither Ricky nor Ethel can guess what Lucy sculpted. Lucy somehow gets Ethel to model for her. She then gets Fred to pose for her and he gets stuck in his bent over position. Ricky will get an art critic from one of the papers to look at Lucy's work. If he says she has talent, Ricky will get her anything she needs. Lucy wants to make a bust of her head, but things go wrong. She ends up disguising herself as the bust in an attempt to fool the critic. Ricky brings Mr. Harvey (Paul Harvey) by. Mr. Harvey is very impressed and wants to buy the bust. Ethel tries to talk him out of it, but Mr. Harvey offers Ricky $500. Lucy reveals herself.
51	16	"Lucy Goes to the Hospital"	William Asher	Jess Oppenheimer, Madelyn Pugh and Bob Carroll, Jr.	November 14, 1952	January 19, 1953
With the baby due at any moment, Ricky is completely on edge. Ricky forgets that he's opening a new show that night. Lucy insists he go to the club. Lucy calls Ethel and asks her and Fred to come over and calm Ricky down. But Ethel and Fred are just as anxious. Ricky and the Mertzes carefully rehearse the trip to the hospital. But when the big moment actually comes, things do not go quite so smoothly. They eventually get there and it's Ricky they bring in on a wheelchair. Ricky is in the waiting room with a Mr. Stanley (Charles Lane). Mr. Stanley isn't excited as he's had six girls before. He hopes this baby will be his last. Mr. Stanley learns his wife had triplets and they're all girls. Ricky calls Fred and asks him to bring his makeup for the voodoo number. Fred and a Nurse (Barbara Pepper) are startled when they see Ricky in full tribal face makeup. Ricky is performing at the club when he gets the call and he rushes to the hospital. Ricky has to explain to a policeman and some of the staff why he's dressed the way he is. Ricky learns Lucy had a boy. Adele Longmire as Nurse. Peggy Rea as Nurse. Note: This episode aired the same day Lucille Ball's son Desi Arnaz Jr. was born. For the five episodes following this one, any scene featuring Lucy was filmed in advance to accommodate Ball's leave, with "flashback" opening scenes featuring only the other cast members filmed closer to the actual airdate.
52	17	"Sales Resistance"	William Asher	Jess Oppenheimer, Madelyn Pugh and Bob Carroll, Jr.	August 29, 1952	January 26, 1953
Lucy is still in the hospital. Ricky tells Fred and Ethel that Lucy bought a tape recorder from a woman in the hospital. She wants to record the baby's first words. The three reminisce about when Lucy bought a new kitchen gadget called the Handy Dandy Kitchen Helper. Flashback to when Lucy tries to demonstrate the device to Ricky and it doesn't go well. Ricky tells Fred that women have no sales resistance. Ricky makes Lucy call the salesman to take it back. Harry Martin (Sheldon Leonard), from the Handy Dandy Company, arrives. Harry flatters Lucy and then tricks her into buying a vacuum cleaner for $102. Later, Ethel comes by and is surprised at what Lucy did. They hear Ricky coming and hide the vacuum. Ricky finds the vacuum and tells Lucy to have the man take it back. Lucy tells Ethel that if she calls Mr. Martin, she'll just wind up buying something else. Lucy decides to try and sell the vacuum. Lucy goes to the home of a Mrs. Simpsons (Verna Felton) and gives her the same sales pitch that Harry used. Things do not go well there. Lucy finally comes home with the vacuum and Ricky calls Harry. Ricky winds up buying a refrigerator and Fred buys a washing machine from Harry. Song: "There's a Brand New Baby in Our House" Written and Performed by Desi Arnaz.
53	18	"The Inferiority Complex"	William Asher	Jess Oppenheimer, Madelyn Pugh and Bob Carroll, Jr.	September 6, 1952	February 2, 1953
Ricky shows Fred and Ethel the presents he's going to bring Lucy at the hospital because she's been a little depressed. Ricky reminisces about the time Lucy had an inferiority complex. Flashback to that time. Lucy is trying to tell a funny story to Ricky, Fred and Ethel, but she keeps forgetting parts of it. Ricky teases Lucy a little and Lucy starts to cry. They decide to play bridge, but then Lucy feels no one wants to be her partner. The next morning, Lucy messes up breakfast. She feels she can't do anything right. Ricky goes to see Dr. Henry Molin (Gerald Mohr), a psychologist. Ricky says that Lucy believes that he's in love with someone else. Henry says he'll find someone to come over and make Lucy feel attractive and better about herself. Henry tells Ricky to introduce the man as an old friend, Chuck Stewart. That night, Ricky is surprised that the man turns out to be Henry. "Chuck" pays Lucy a lot of compliments and then dances with her. Ricky is getting a little jealous and reveals that Chuck is really Dr. Henry Molin. The next day, Ricky tells Fred and Ethel that Lucy feels even worse. They find a way to really cheer up Lucy. Song: Lucy sings "Who".
54	19	"The Club Election"	William Asher	Jess Oppenheimer, Madelyn Pugh and Bob Carroll, Jr.	September 12, 1952	February 16, 1953
Ricky is feeding little Ricky when Ethel comes by. Ethel mentions that the Wednesday Afternoon Fine Arts League will be meeting on Friday to nominate officers. Ricky asks her if she remembers what happened the last time they nominated officers. Flashback to then. Lucy tells Ricky that her club is meeting here. Lucy is sure she'll be nominated for some office. Lucy hopes that Ruth Knickerbocker gets admitted to the club. Lillian Appleby (Doris Singleton) comes by. Lillian is about to gossip about Marion Strong (Margie Liszt) when Marion arrives. The other ladies then show up. They vote to admit Ruth. Ethel is nominated to be the next president. Lucy bribes Lillian into nominating her as well. Lucy and Ethel's campaigns end up taking a nasty turn. They soon discover that the deciding vote will be from the club's newest member, Ruth. Ricky and Fred each campaign separately for the other woman to win. At the club, Ricky sings to and dances with a woman he thinks is Ruth. Lucy and Ethel come by and say that Ruth didn't vote so they are co-presidents. Ricky learns he was wooing Ruth's Mother-In-Law (Ida Moore). Lurene Tuttle as Club President. Peggy Rea as Club member. Jerry Hausner as Baby Ricky (voice). Songs: Desi sings "Cuban Cabby" and "Cielito Lindo".
55	20	"The Black Eye"	William Asher	Jess Oppenheimer, Madelyn Pugh and Bob Carroll, Jr.	September 19, 1952	March 9, 1953
Ethel accidentally slams the door against Fred's nose. Fred is worried that he may get a black eye. Ricky reminds Ethel about the time Lucy had a black eye and Ethel didn't believe how it happened. Flashback to that time. Lucy and Ricky are both reading the same thrilling novel. They decide to read it aloud to enjoy it at the same time. Fred and Ethel are outside the door and hear the dramatic dialogue. They think Lucy and Ricky are fighting. Ricky tosses the book to Lucy for her to put it away. It accidentally hits her in the face, giving her a black eye. When Fred and Ethel see the black eye, both Lucy and Ricky joke that he hit her. They tell them what really happened, but Fred and Ethel don't believe them. The next day Ethel will still not accept the truth. Lucy decides to concoct a "juicy story" about her falling in love with another man and Ricky got violent. When Ricky doesn't have time to send Lucy flowers, Fred decides to send them. With the flowers, Fred sends a romantic note. He later realizes he signed his name and not Ricky's. Ethel is there when Lucy opens the box of flowers and sees Fred's note. The misunderstanding escalates to where Ethel gives Fred a black eye and Fred gives Ricky a black eye. Fred and Ethel finally believe Lucy's story when Fred tosses a book to Ethel and gives her a black eye.
56	21	"Lucy Changes Her Mind"	William Asher	Jess Oppenheimer, Madelyn Pugh and Bob Carroll, Jr.	September 26, 1952	March 30, 1953
Ethel comes by and Ricky tells her that Lucy rearranged the furniture again. Ricky says Lucy always changes her mind. He asks Ethel if she remembers the time they went to the Roof Garden for dinner. Flashback to that time. Lucy took all day to get ready. It takes a while to decide where to go. Once at the restaurant, Lucy wants to switch tables. Henry the Waiter (Frank Nelson) gets confused. Lucy changes her order several times. Lucy wants to switch tables again. The next day, Lucy tells Ethel that from now on she is going to finish things she started. Ethel says she heard Ricky yelling at her. Lucy shows Ethel a love letter she wrote to Tom Henderson (John Hart) years ago, but never finished. Tom owns a fur salon now. Lucy wants to play a trick on Ricky with the letter. However, Fred finds out from Ethel and warns Ricky of Lucy's plot. Ricky plays along and tells Lucy he'll mail the letter to Tom, but he really won't. Lucy and Ethel go to the Fur Salon to explain things to Tom. Lucy sees short and bald Harry Henderson (Phil Arnold) and thinks it's Tom. Ricky and Fred come by. Lucy confesses about the trick with the letter. Handsome Tom comes out from the back.
57	22	"No Children Allowed"	William Asher	Jess Oppenheimer, Madelyn Pugh and Bob Carroll, Jr.	March 20, 1953	April 20, 1953
Lucy is having a hard time getting Little Ricky to stop crying. Ethel comes by and they hear Mrs. Trumbull (Elizabeth Patterson), from upstairs, pounding on the floor. Fred gets Little Ricky to stop crying and go to sleep. It's late and Ricky comes home. The baby starts crying again. The next morning, Lucy and Ethel plan a Bridge party. Mrs. Trumbull comes by and mentions the lease does not allow children in the building. Despite Mrs. Trumbull threatening to move out, Ethel stands up for Lucy. Ethel starts bragging to everyone about how she stood up for Lucy. The Women's Club members come by for the bridge game. Ethel brags to them about telling off Mrs. Trumbull. Lucy has finally had enough and her and Ethel get into an argument. Mrs. Trumbull threatens to call the police because of the baby. The husbands get Lucy and Ethel to apologize to each other. Fred and Ricky then get into an argument. The wives get them to apologize. While this is going on, Mrs. Trumbull has a change of heart and actually begins to like Little Ricky. Vivi Janiss as Clubwoman. Charlotte Lawrence as Clubwoman. Margie Liszt as Clubwoman. Peggy Rea as Clubwoman. Note: This episode marked the beginning of recurring character Mrs. Trumbull.
58	23	"Lucy Hires a Maid"	William Asher	Jess Oppenheimer, Madelyn Pugh and Bob Carroll, Jr.	March 27, 1953	April 27, 1953
Lucy is exhausted from staying up nights with Little Ricky. Fred and Ethel come over to play Bridge, but Lucy is sleeping. Ricky decides to get Lucy a maid. The next morning Ricky tells Lucy the type of questions she needs to ask the potential maid. Lucy needs to be firm with the woman. Lucy practices on Ethel. Mrs. Porter (Verna Felton) comes by and she's the one that's firm with Lucy. She won't take care of the baby. Lucy tells Ethel that Mrs. Porter walks all over her, she gets most of the time off and eats most of the food. Ethel says she should fire Mrs. Porter, but Lucy is afraid. Lucy goes to fire Mrs. Porter, but gets cold feet. Ricky can't get up the nerve to fire her either. Lucy and Ethel wind up trashing the apartment to make Mrs. Porter want to leave. Fred even helps mess the place up. Ricky comes home and says he fired Mrs. Porter an hour ago.
59	24	"The Indian Show"	William Asher	Jess Oppenheimer, Madelyn Pugh and Bob Carroll, Jr.	April 3, 1953	May 4, 1953
Lucy suggested that Ricky study up on American history so one day he can tell it to Little Ricky. Fred sees Ricky reading a book about Native Americans. Ricky wants to do a Native American show at the club. Fred asks if he can be in it, but Ricky doesn't think it would work. Ricky figures that motherhood has ended Lucy's show business ambitions, but he is wrong. Ricky tells her she can't be in the show. Lucy and Ethel are frightened when a Tall Native American (Richard Reeves) and a Short Native American (Frank Gerstle) arrive at the door. They knock the men out by hitting them on the head with vases. Fred comes by and says they are actors who came to audition for Ricky. The men wind up being OK and go to the club. Fred tells Ethel that Ricky has a spot for them in the show. Lucy brings Little Ricky to the club where the rehearsal is going on. Lucy persuades Juanita (Carol Richards), the female vocalist, to switch places with her because Juanita wants to spend time with her baby. Ricky is surprised when Lucy appears instead of Juanita. Little Ricky ends up in the show too. Songs: Desi, William and Vivian sing "Pass That Peace Pipe". Desi, Carol Richards and Lucy sing "By the Waters of the Minnetonka".
60	25	"Lucy's Last Birthday"	William Asher	Jess Oppenheimer, Madelyn Pugh and Bob Carroll, Jr.	April 10, 1953	May 11, 1953
Mrs. Trumbull comes by to wish Lucy a happy birthday. Lucy says she stopped having birthdays. Lucy does say that Ricky never forgets her birthday. Ricky leaves for the club and doesn't mention Lucy's birthday. Ricky checks with Fred to make sure he ordered the cake for Lucy's surprise party at the club. Lucy becomes very depressed when Ethel doesn't remember her birthday. Lucy decides to throw her own birthday party, but none of her friends can make it. Mrs. Trumbull wants to celebrate with Lucy, but Lucy wants to take a walk. Mrs. Trumbull calls Ricky and learns about the party. Lucy is in the park. She meets the "Friends of the Friendless". They all march to Ricky's club to protest. Lucy is surprised and thrilled when she sees all the people there for her birthday. Ransom Sherman as Man in the Park. Byron Foulger as Leader of the Band. Barbara Pepper as Friends of the Friendless Member. Songs: Elizabeth Patterson, Lucy and Byron Foulger sing "Happy Birthday to You". Lucy and Byron Foulger sing "Friends of the Friendless". Note: This episode features Ricky singing "I Love Lucy," a version of the show's theme song with lyrics.
61	26	"The Ricardos Change Apartments"	William Asher	Jess Oppenheimer, Madelyn Pugh and Bob Carroll, Jr.	April 16, 1953	May 18, 1953
Lucy tells Ethel that she's been trying to talk Ricky into moving to a bigger apartment now that they have the baby. Ethel says they don't have a larger apartment vacant. Lucy says that it doesn't matter as Ricky says they can't afford it. Ricky is finding things in places they shouldn't be. Lucy says there just isn't any room in this apartment. Lucy learns from Ethel that neighbor Mrs. Benson (Norma Varden) has an extra room now that her daughter has married. Lucy comes up with the idea to swap apartments with Mr. and Mrs. Benson. Ricky says he won't do it as the Benson apartment costs more. The next day, Lucy hints to Fred and Ethel that she could move to the Benson apartment if the rent were the same as what they're paying now. Fred and Ethel say they can't do it. To get Ricky on board, Lucy fills up their apartment with junk to show him how small it is. That plan doesn't work. Lucy and Ethel go to see Mrs. Benson and Lucy talks her into trading apartments. Lucy tells Mrs. Benson she'll arrange to have the furniture moved. Lucy gets Fred and Ethel to help. They finally get everything moved and go get something to eat. When they get back the furniture is back in the original place. Turns out Ricky wanted to surprise Lucy and had movers switch the furniture. They didn't know it had already been switched.
62	27	"Lucy Is Matchmaker"	William Asher	Jess Oppenheimer, Madelyn Pugh and Bob Carroll, Jr.	April 25, 1953	May 25, 1953
Lucy and some girlfriends are playing Bridge and gossiping about Sylvia Collins. All the men are always fawning over her. Lucy thinks they need to find Sylvia a husband. Later, Ricky tells Lucy that they have to entertain a bachelor friend of Fred's. Ricky says he's some kind of traveling salesman. Ricky wants no matchmaking. Eddie Grant (Hal March) arrives and tells Ricky he sells lingerie. Lucy starts in right away about Eddie meeting a beautiful woman. Fred comes by and Eddie leaves with him. Later, Lucy calls Sylvia, who agrees to meet Eddie. Lucy calls Eddie and he thinks Lucy wants a date with him. Eddie calls Fred and says he can't have lunch as he has a date. Fred calls Ricky and says they should go see what the woman Eddie has a date with looks like. Meanwhile, Ethel tells Lucy that Sylvia can't make the date. Lucy will go and tell Eddie. Fred is in the hotel lobby when Lucy comes by and tells Eddie that Sylvia can't make it. Ricky arrives and Eddie leaves. Lucy does get Eddie and Sylvia together. There's another misunderstanding, but Ricky and Fred teach the wives a lesson. Phil Arnold as Man in Hotel. Peggy Rea as Card player. Doris Singleton as Caroline Appleby.
63	28	"Lucy Wants New Furniture"	William Asher	Jess Oppenheimer, Madelyn Pugh and Bob Carroll, Jr.	May 1, 1953	June 1, 1953
Ricky really likes their new apartment and the room for Little Ricky. Lucy would like a new couch and coffee table for the living room, but Ricky says no. Fred and Ethel come by and Ethel mentions the old couch and coffee table. Ricky knows Lucy put Ethel up to that. Lucy tells Ethel that there was a sale at the furniture store and she already bought the stuff. It will be delivered in the morning. The next morning, Lucy and Ethel hide the furniture in the kitchen. Things get complicated when Lucy serves dinner in the living room, because she can't get into the kitchen. Ricky does find the new furniture. Because she can't return the furniture as she bought it on sale, Ricky says she will have to pay for it out of her allowance. He will store the furniture at the club until Lucy pays for it. Lucy economizes by giving Ricky small portions of food. She washed Ricky's suit in the kitchen sink. Lucy wants one last new dress and a permanent for the party at the club Saturday night. Ricky says no. To save money, Lucy attempts to make her own dress and gives herself a home perm. It does not go well. Ricky feels bad and will let her get a new dress and a permanent. Lucy says they will have to get a new rug. When she cut out her dress, she cut up the rug as well.
64	29	"The Camping Trip"	William Asher	Jess Oppenheimer, Madelyn Pugh and Bob Carroll, Jr.	May 8, 1953	June 8, 1953
While playing Bridge, Caroline Appleby mentions that Joanne and Greg are separating. Lucy says that her and Ricky have a lot in common. When Ricky comes home, Lucy tries to tell him about her day, but he's just reading the paper. Lucy gets Ricky to engage in an awkward conversation. The next day Fred tells Ricky that his brother has everything set for their camping trip this summer. Lucy implies that she wants to go with. Fred tells Ricky that he learned from Ethel that Lucy is trying to prove to the girls in the bridge club that Lucy and him are not bored with each other. Ricky decides to take Lucy into the wilderness for a practice trip this weekend to make her hate camping. Ethel tells Lucy that she overheard Ricky and Fred talking about his plan. Lucy will have Ethel help her. In the forest, Ricky tells Lucy about how they have to stand in the cold water to catch trout. Lucy talks Ricky into fishing in separate places. Ethel brings Lucy a dozen trout she bought. Ricky is stunned when he sees Lucy's fish. Lucy says she'll race Ricky back to camp. Lucy has Ethel drive her to camp. Three hours later, Ricky makes it to camp exhausted. The next morning Ricky and Lucy are about to go hunting. With Ethel's help, Lucy shows off her target shooting. When Lucy goes to shoot a duck, Ethel drops one with no feathers and it's been cleaned. Ricky finds Ethel in a tree. Lucy decides that her and Ricky don't need to share everything.
65	30	"Ricky and Fred Are TV Fans"	William Asher	Jess Oppenheimer, Madelyn Pugh and Bob Carroll, Jr.	May 22, 1953	June 22, 1953
Lucy and Ethel would like to go to the movies, but Ricky and Fred are watching a boxing match on TV. The wives come up with a plan to have the men wonder where they are. They go to a local diner. There Officer Jenkins (Allen Jenkins) and Max the Counter Man (Lawrence Dobkin) are also watching the fights. Lucy calls the apartment, disguises her voice and asks for Lucy. Hopefully the men will realize the wives are gone and get concerned. Ricky just puts the phone down and goes back to watching the fight. Lucy wants to get change, but Max doesn't pay attention to her. She goes to get her own change. Officer Jenkins wants to arrest them, but they get away and run home. Lucy decides to go on the roof and cut the wire going to the TV. When they get on the roof, there are so many wires, they don't know which one it is. Officer Jenkins shows up. He thinks they want to cut the power to the building and then rob it. At the Police Station, Jenkins tells Sergeant Nelson (Frank Nelson) that he caught the women who have been burglarizing the area. Nelson thinks they are Pick Pocket Pearl and Sticky Fingers Sal. Lucy tells Jenkins to go to her apartment and get the husbands. Jenkins watches the fight and Ricky and Fred don't even notice him. Jenkins confirms who Lucy and Ethel are and Nelson lets them go. Ricky and Fred never knew the wives were gone.
66	31	"Never Do Business With Friends"	William Asher	Jess Oppenheimer, Madelyn Pugh and Bob Carroll, Jr.	May 29, 1953	June 29, 1953
Lucy has laundry hanging all over the kitchen. She tells Ricky she wouldn't have to do it if she had an automatic dryer. He says they are too expensive. Ethel mentions to Lucy how old her washing machine is. While Lucy is complaining, Ricky tries to tell her he bought a new washer and dryer. Fred would like to buy Lucy's old washer. Ricky doesn't think friends should do business together, but he is talked into selling it for $35. Before Fred pays for the washer, it breaks down. Ricky still wants Fred to pay for the washer and they get into an argument. Mrs. Trumbull says she has a nephew who might be able to fix the washer. Joe (Herb Vigran) tells his aunt that he can fix the washer, but he'd actually like to buy it. Joe tells Ethel he will pay $50. Mrs. Trumbull tells Lucy and Ricky that Joe will pay $50. Now each couple wants to keep the washer. While fighting over the washer, it falls off a balcony and is destroyed. Joe comes by and says he has a buyer who will pay $75.

=== Season 3 (1953–54) ===
No. overall	No. in season	Title	Directed by	Written by	Film date	Original release date
67	1	"Ricky's 'Life' Story"	William Asher	Jess Oppenheimer, Madelyn Pugh and Bob Carroll, Jr.	May 15, 1953	October 5, 1953
Ethel brings Lucy her mail. Life magazine did a picture story on Ricky. Lucy is disappointed when she sees that she's not in it. Lucy now feels resentful of Ricky for not letting her have a career in show business. Ricky tells her that her career is being a mother. Fred gives Ricky an idea. Ricky tells Lucy that she will be the star in his new show at the club. He will teach Lucy a lesson that show business is not all just glamour and stardom. Ricky works her very hard during rehearsals, with no intention of actually using her in the show. Lucy is exhausted and admits to Ricky that she can't keep up. He gives her a part where she just sits with a rose in her mouth. Back at home, Fred inadvertently tells Lucy about Ricky's scheme. Lucy won't tell Ricky about what Fred said if he helps her get even. Lucy decides to upstage Ricky during his singing numbers. Ricky does discover what Lucy is doing. Songs: Desi sings "Lady of Spain", "The Loveliest Night of the Year" and "Babalú".
68	2	"The Girls Go Into Business"	William Asher	Jess Oppenheimer, Madelyn Pugh and Bob Carroll, Jr.	September 11, 1953	October 12, 1953
Lucy and Ethel buy new dresses on sale from a shop that is closing. Ricky complains about the business he is in. Everyone wants something from him. He would like a business with more security. Lucy and Ethel suggest buying Hansen's dress shop. When Ricky says that he and Fred know nothing about running a dress shop, Lucy says her and Ethel will run it. Ricky says no. Lucy goes to see Mrs. Hansen (Mabel Paige), because Ricky is making her return the dress. Without the men knowing, Lucy and Ethel buy the business and for Mrs. Hansen's asking price. They argue over what to name the shop. It's been days and they haven't made a sale. Mrs. Hansen comes by and says their check bounced. Lucy tricks Ricky to telling Mrs. Hansen the check is good. Ethel tells Lucy that a Ralph S. Boyer called and wants to buy the store. They make a $500 profit. Ricky and Fred still do not know that the wives had bought the store. Ricky tells them about an article in the paper. There is to be a skyscraper built in that area and Boyer sold the store to the construction company for $50,000. Barbara Pepper as Customer in dress shop. Emory Parnell as Cop.
69	3	"Lucy and Ethel Buy the Same Dress"	William Asher	Jess Oppenheimer, Madelyn Pugh and Bob Carroll, Jr.	September 17, 1953	October 19, 1953
The Women's Club is meeting at Lucy's place. Lucy thinks they should have their yearly show sometime next week. Caroline Appleby (Doris Singleton) mentions that her husband is a manager of a TV station. Caroline says they can do their show on TV. Lucy and Marion Strong (Shirley Mitchell) each want to be Chairwoman. Lucy says that if she is Chairwoman, she will get Ricky as Master of Ceremonies. Lucy and Ethel tell Fred he can be in the show. The two decide they will sing Cole Porter's "Friendship" together. Lucy manages to use reverse psychology to get Ricky to host the event. All is well until the two women buy the same dress for the occasion. So there isn't a conflict, Ricky suggests they both take the dresses back. It's the night of the show and Lucy still has the dress. Turns out Ethel didn't return the dress either. Things get uncomfortable when Lucy and Ethel start performing in the same dresses. Songs: William and Vivian sing "When the Red, Red Robin (Comes Bob, Bob, Bobbin' Along)". Desi sings "Vaya con Dios".
70	4	"Equal Rights"	William Asher	Jess Oppenheimer, Madelyn Pugh and Bob Carroll, Jr.	September 24, 1953	October 26, 1953
Ricky is trying to tell an amusing story to Fred and Ethel, but Lucy keeps interrupting him. Lucy picks a place to go for dinner, but Ricky wants to go somewhere else. Ricky says that the man is the master and the woman does what she is told. Tired of Ricky and Fred's attitude towards them, the girls demand equal rights. After dinner, Ricky and Fred turn the tables on the girls when they call for separate checks. Since Ethel and Lucy have no money, the Waiter (Lawrence Dobkin) makes them wash dishes to pay for their meals. The girls get a little frustrated with each other. They then realize they have no money to get home. To get even, they call their husbands from the restaurant and fake a robbery to scare them. The men call the police and then race to the restaurant. When they get there, Ricky and Fred soon see through the scheme. They decide to get back at the girls by impersonating a couple robbers. Two Policemen arrive and Ricky tries to explain that it was all a joke. Lucy and Ethel get one last jab in by playing along with Ricky's ruse. Ricky and Fred are hauled off to jail. Lucy and Ethel come by the jail and everyone makes amends. Fred Aldrich as Policeman. Richard Reeves as Policeman.
71	5	"Baby Pictures"	William Asher	Jess Oppenheimer, Madelyn Pugh and Bob Carroll, Jr.	October 1, 1953	November 2, 1953
Ricky picks up some pictures he took of Little Ricky. He mentions to Lucy that Carolyn and Charlie Appleby (Hy Averback) are coming over tonight. Charlie wants to talk about a television appearance for Ricky. Lucy reminds Ricky that they had an agreement to not bore people with pictures of their baby. Later, Ricky is showing the pictures to Fred and Ethel. Carolyn and Charlie arrive and start bragging about their little Stevie. They then take out pictures of Stevie. Lucy and Ricky take out the pictures of Little Ricky. The next day, Lucy tells Ethel that she is taking Little Ricky over to Carolyn's place. Lucy and Carolyn end up in a hostile feud over the children. Back at home, Lucy tells Ethel that Ricky's TV appearance could be in jeopardy. Ricky comes home and says that rehearsal for the TV show went well. Charlie calls and tells Ricky the show is off. Ricky tells Lucy she better get him back on the show. Ricky does get back on the show and so does Lucy with Stevie. Song: Desi sings "Acapulco".
72	6	"Lucy Tells the Truth"	William Asher	Jess Oppenheimer, Madelyn Pugh and Bob Carroll, Jr.	October 8, 1953	November 9, 1953
Ricky, Fred and Ethel are telling show business stories. Ethel thinks they should change the subject as Lucy doesn't have any stories to tell. Lucy claims she was in show business. The others know she is telling a fib. They then catch Lucy in another lie. Ricky and the Mertzes bet Lucy $100 that she cannot go twenty-four hours without telling a fib. The next day Lucy and Ethel go to Caroline Appleby's place to play Bridge. Caroline had her place remodeled in Chinese Modern. Lucy has to be truthful and say she doesn't like it. Marion Strong comes by with a new hat, which Lucy thinks is ugly. Everyone begins to regret the bet when Lucy starts being brutally frank with them. Ricky has a plan. Ricky is going to an audition for a TV show and will take Lucy along. If she hopes to get a part, she will have to lie about her talent. At the audition, the Casting Director (Charles Lane) asks Lucy about her experience. She has to be honest and says she has none. Things get interesting when Lucy winds up in a knife throwing act with Professor Falcony (Mario Siletti). Wilbur Hatch as Piano Player.
73	7	"The French Revue"	William Asher	Jess Oppenheimer, Madelyn Pugh and Bob Carroll, Jr.	October 15, 1953	November 16, 1953
Lucy and Ricky will be going to a new French restaurant with Fred and Ethel. Lucy says that Caroline told her the menus are all in French. At the restaurant, they each wait for the other person to order. The waiter is getting impatient and finally says he will bring the special of the day. Lucy and Ethel decide to take French lessons. Ricky says they can do it as long as it doesn't cost him anything. The next day, Lucy tells Ethel she called the restaurant and the waiter agreed to teach them French for free. Robert DuBois (Alberto Morin) arrives and starts teaching them a few words. Turns out that Robert is a struggling entertainer. He agreed to teach them for free hoping that Ricky would put him in one of his shows. Ricky is inspired to stage a French Revue at his club. Lucy, Fred and Ethel want to be in it, but Ricky says no. Robert comes by and Ricky tells him to come to the club tomorrow for an audition. Lucy bets Ricky fifty dollars that she can sneak into the act. It takes several attempts, but Lucy does get into the act. Fred Aldrich as Stagehand. Richard Reeves as Stagehand. Songs: Desi sings "Valentine".
74	8	"Redecorating the Mertzes' Apartment"	William Asher	Jess Oppenheimer, Madelyn Pugh and Bob Carroll, Jr.	October 22, 1953	November 23, 1953
Lucy calls Caroline and tells her that Ricky is buying her a mink stole. If Lucy says mink stole one more time, Ricky won't buy it. Ethel comes by and Lucy tries to have her guess what Ricky is buying her. Ethel is ashamed to host a women's club meeting in her drab apartment. Ricky refuses to let Lucy host it in theirs. The Ricardos offer to help the Mertzes paint their apartment. Ricky gets talked into paying for the paint. Ethel tells Fred she would like to buy new furniture. Fred wants to keep the old furniture and they get into an argument. Lucy suggests to Ricky that they reupholster the furniture. The painting goes fairly well. The reupholstering turns into a disaster. Ricky ends up having to go back on his promise to buy Lucy a mink stole in order to replace their furniture, which they gave to the Mertzes to replace what was ruined.
75	9	"Too Many Crooks"	William Asher	Jess Oppenheimer, Madelyn Pugh and Bob Carroll, Jr.	October 29, 1953	November 30, 1953
It's late at night and someone is ringing the Ricardo's doorbell. It's the Mertzs, some other neighbors and a Policeman (Allen Jenkins). Ethel says there's been a robbery in the area. The Policeman says that the crook they are looking for is "Madame X," the mysterious burglar. The next morning there's a story about Madame X in the paper. Ethel wants Fred to put new locks on all the apartment doors. It's also learned that Fred has a birthday coming up. Lucy and Ricky want to get Fred a new suit. Lucy will sneak into the Mertzs apartment to get an old suit of his for the measurements. Mrs. Trumbull (Elizabeth Patterson) tells Ethel she saw Lucky sneaking out of the apartment with a suit. Ethel and Fred want to find out for sure if Lucy is Madame X. Ethel is on the fire escape looking into Lucy's place. Lucy now suspects that Ethel is the burglar. Both Lucy and Ethel want to get each other's fingerprints, but they aren't able to do it. When the real Madame X breaks into the Ricardos apartment, Lucy believes her to be Ethel and bravely tussles with her. When Ethel enters the apartment, things become chaotic and Madame X escapes. Ricky chases Madame X back into the apartment and the police arrive.
76	10	"Changing the Boys' Wardrobe"	William Asher	Jess Oppenheimer, Madelyn Pugh and Bob Carroll, Jr.	November 5, 1953	December 7, 1953
Ricky is upset with his publicity man Jerry (Jerry Hausner). Ricky and Fred anger Lucy and Ethel by wearing their old clothes in public. The wives secretly sell their husbands' clothes to a second-hand clothes dealer. Ricky gets a call from Zeb Allen, the clothes dealer, who tells him what Lucy did. Ricky and Fred buy the clothes all back. At home, Lucy tells Ricky a made up a story about how his old clothes were accidentally burned up. Ricky shows Lucy his old clothes. At the club, Jerry tells Ricky that he's arranged for him to receive an honor as one of the best-dressed men in the country. Jerry says that before the show tonight, a photographer will come by to take pictures. Ricky tells Fred that he wants to surprise Lucy and Ethel with the news in public. Summoned to the club without knowing the reason, Lucy and Ethel try to teach their husbands a lesson by showing up in ragged clothes. They find Ricky and Fred dressed to the nines. When he learns who the women are, the photographer takes a picture of them. Tony Terran Trumpet Solo Song: Desi sings "Granada".
77	11	"Lucy Has Her Eyes Examined"	William Asher	Jess Oppenheimer, Madelyn Pugh and Bob Carroll, Jr.	November 12, 1953	December 14, 1953
Lucy calls Ricky at the club and asks him if he still has a headache. He says he does. Lucy thinks he should have his eyes examined. Bill Parker (Dayton Lummis) comes to the club. He's in town to produce a Broadway show and would like to use the club to hold auditions. Ricky invites Bill to dinner, but they won't tell Lucy Bill's a producer. Fred and Ethel tell Lucy that Bill is a producer. That night when Ricky and Bill arrive, Lucy, Fred and Ethel audition for him. Ricky is not happy. Bill says they can audition for him tomorrow. The next day, Ricky sends Arthur Walsh to teach Lucy the Jitterbug. Arthur and Lucy dance for Bill at the club. Bill would like to see them dance that night in front of an audience. Ricky reluctantly will allow it. Lucy takes Ricky to the Eye Doctor (Shepard Menken). Ricky's eyes are fine, but Lucy's aren't. The Doctor gives Lucy eye drops that leave her vision hopelessly blurred for the rest of the day. Lucy still wants to dance that evening. That night Fred and Ethel perform and do well. Lucy and Arthur are next and things get a little confusing. Songs: Lucy, Vivian and William sing "There's No Business Like Show Business". William and Vivian sing "The Varsity Drag".
78	12	"Ricky's Old Girlfriend"	William Asher	Jess Oppenheimer, Madelyn Pugh and Bob Carroll, Jr.	November 19, 1953	December 21, 1953
Fred and Ethel are over. Lucy suggests they take a marriage quiz. One of the questions is about past romances. Lucy lists off quite a lot of guys. Ricky invents one from Cuba named Carlota Romero. Lucy wants to know why he never mentioned her before and she gets upset. Ricky tells her he just made it up, but she doesn't believe him. The next morning, Lucy is still mad. Fred tells Ricky that he saw in the paper that a singer from Cuba with that same name will be performing in town. Ethel lets it slip to Lucy about Carlota being in town. Lucy sees her picture in the paper and she's quite pretty. Ethel tries to make Lucy feel better. That night Lucy dreams that pretty Carlotta (Lillian Molieri) steals Ricky away from her. Lucy and little Ricky wind up begging on the street. Little Ricky grows up and they are still begging on the street. Lucy wakes up and hits Ricky with a pillow. Later, Lucy tells Ricky that she invited Fred, Ethel, Jerry and Carlotta over. Jerry arrives and reminds Ricky that he did work with Carlotta one time 15 years ago. Ricky starts to worry. However, the photo of Carlota was an old one, and when she (Rosa Turich) comes to the apartment, her looks have clearly faded, putting Lucy's mind at ease.
79	13	"The Million Dollar Idea"	William Asher	Jess Oppenheimer, Madelyn Pugh and Bob Carroll, Jr.	November 26, 1953	January 11, 1954
Fred and Ethel are over for dinner. Ethel tells Lucy that the salad dressing is the best she's ever tasted. Lucy says the recipe was given to her by her Aunt Martha. Fred tells her she should sell it. Ricky mentions that Lucy is overdrawn at the bank and he wants to know why. The next day, Lucy wishes she knew a way to make money. She decides to bottle the salad dressing and call it "Aunt Martha's Old Fashioned Salad Dressing". Ethel will help. Lucy remembers that Caroline Applebee's husband works at a TV station. Lucy would like to advertise the dressing. Lucy and Ethel go on the Dickie Davis (Frank Nelson) show. The orders start coming in and the girls think they will become millionaires. Ricky figures out that they have priced the product so cheaply that it will cost them rather than make them money. Fred tells them there are three sacks of mail with orders. Lucy and Ethel go back on TV and try to make the salad dressing look awful so no one will buy it. This backfires because it just encouraged more people to buy it. Lucy and Ethel end up having to relabel store-bought salad dressing to fill all their orders.
80	14	"Ricky Minds the Baby"	William Asher	Jess Oppenheimer, Madelyn Pugh and Bob Carroll, Jr.	December 3, 1953	January 18, 1954
Ricky tells Fred that they are repainting the club, so he has a week off. Ethel asks him what he will do. Ricky mentions going to the fights with Fred, poker one night and maybe a hunting trip. Lucy would like Ricky to spend some time with his son. Ricky agrees and will cancel his other plans. Ricky wants to put Little Ricky to bed and tell him a bedtime story. He will tell Little Ricky "Little Red Riding Hood" in Spanish. Lucy, Ethel and Fred listen and watch from outside the room. Ricky will give Lucy a break and watch the baby the whole week. The next day, Lucy is a little anxious about Ricky watching the baby. Lucy and Ethel decide to go shopping. Ricky is adjusting the TV so he and Fred can watch the fights. While Ricky is distracted, Little Ricky wanders into the Mertzes' apartment. Finding Little Ricky, Lucy decides to teach Ricky a lesson that he will never forget. She calls to ask about the baby and Ricky panics when he cannot find him. Lucy comes back to the apartment and Ricky says the baby is napping. Fred finds Little Ricky in his own apartment and brings him back to the Ricardos' without anyone else knowing. Lucy, Ricky and Ethel are confused when they find Little Ricky back in his crib.
81	15	"The Charm School"	William Asher	Jess Oppenheimer, Madelyn Pugh and Bob Carroll, Jr.	December 10, 1953	January 25, 1954
Ethel tells Lucy and Louann Hall (Vivi Janiss) that whenever she diets, it never works. Lucy complains that the wives are in one room and Ricky, Fred and Bill Hall (Tyler McVey) are in another. The women force the men into the living room. They all try to find a subject to talk about. The men wind up talking to each other and the wives do the same. The men go back into the kitchen. Tom Williams comes by with his pretty young date, Eve Whitney. The men fawn over Eve. The next morning, Lucy tells Ethel that she heard Eve tell Tom that she went to a charm school. Lucy and Ethel go to Phoebe Emerson's (Natalie Schafer) Charm School for a free analysis. Phoebe will grade them on hair, makeup, posture and voice. Lucy and Ethel do not grade well and want to start the course right away. It's been a week and the wives tell the men to expect a surprise. Ricky and Fred are shocked when they see Lucy all glammed up. Ethel then arrives. The men agree to take the wives out to dinner, but they will need to change first. Ricky tells Fred he has a plan. Ricky dresses as a Medieval English statesman and Fred has on a top hat and tails. Lucy and Ethel agree to go back to the way they were.
82	16	"Sentimental Anniversary"	William Asher	Jess Oppenheimer, Madelyn Pugh and Bob Carroll, Jr.	December 17, 1953	February 1, 1954
Lucy shows Ethel the golf clubs she is giving Ricky for their anniversary. Lucy wonders how she can subtly remind Ricky about the anniversary. Ethel lets it slip that Ricky did remember and he got her something. Ethel reluctantly leads Lucy to the gift, which is a fox stole. Later, Ricky brings up the anniversary and tells Lucy he will have the night off. Lucy tells him she would like to spend it home alone and have a romantic dinner. Meanwhile, Ethel tells Fred that their surprise anniversary party at the Tropicana will have to be canceled as Ricky took the night off. They try to figure out how they can still have the party. Lucy wants to make sure no one knows they are staying home. It's the night of the anniversary. Lucy and Ricky make it look as though they are going out and then sneak back into their apartment. They exchange their presents. Lucy and Ricky then hear Fred and Ethel coming and hide in the closet. Fred and Ethel start setting things up for the party. The guests start arriving. Lucy and Ricky continuing celebrating in the closet. They find a way to sneak out and then come back to join the party. Barbara Pepper as Party Guest.
83	17	"Fan Magazine Interview"	William Asher	Jess Oppenheimer, Madelyn Pugh and Bob Carroll, Jr.	January 7, 1954	February 8, 1954
Lucy complains to Ricky that she doesn't have enough money in the food budget. Fred comes by to fix the leaky pipe. Ricky thinks everyone is grumpy this morning. Ricky's agent Jerry calls and tells him he set up an interview with Eleanor Harris (Joan Banks), a magazine writer. She wants to do an article about a happily married couple. The next morning Eleanor arrives and Lucy is all dressed up. Eleanor would like Lucy to just do what she would normally do. Eleanor is also taking pictures, so Lucy and Ricky put on their best manners. Ethel and Fred come by all dressed up. At the club, Jerry tells Ricky that he arranged for the club to be filled with women Saturday night. Eleanor is still interviewing Lucy and asks her if she is the jealous type. Lucy now starts to wonder if Ricky has been faithful. Complications arise when Lucy finds a letter in Ricky's coat pocket and thinks that Ricky is seeing another woman named Minnie Finch. In actuality, the letter is just part of Jerry's publicity stunt to get women to the club. Lucy and Ethel go to the address on the letter. Minnie (Kathryn Card) turns out to be an elderly, disheveled woman. Ethel tells Lucy that this is obviously Jerry's doing. When they get home, Ricky is there with a black eye. Minnie's husband hit him. Elvia Allman as Minnie's Neighbor with glasses and a hat. Note: This was Jerry Hausner's last appearance on the series.
84	18	"Oil Wells"	William Asher	Jess Oppenheimer, Madelyn Pugh and Bob Carroll, Jr.	January 14, 1954	February 15, 1954
Fred tells Ricky that Lucy and Ethel are watching the new tenants move in. Ethel tells Lucy that their last name is Johnson. Nancy Johnson (Sandra Gould) comes to Lucy's door looking for Ethel. Nancy would like an extra key to her apartment. She mentions that they are from Texas and her husband Sam (Harry Cheshire) has oil wells. Sam comes by and meets everyone. He says that he has shares of stock in his oil wells to sell. Lucy and Ethel want to by some of the shares, but Ricky and Fred aren't interested. The next day, Ricky and Lucy learn that Fred bought the shares and they are not happy. They guilt Fred into splitting the shares with them. Lucy and Ethel are looking forward to being millionaires. Ken (Ken Christy), a Detective, comes by looking for the Johnsons. They start to wonder if they've been swindled. Lucy wants to get some evidence and goes to see Sam. Despite Sam's claims that everything is legit, Lucy gets their money back. Later, they discover that Ken bought the stock and the well started producing oil. It was not a scam and thanks to Lucy, they have now missed out on a fortune.
85	19	"Ricky Loses His Temper"	William Asher	Jess Oppenheimer, Madelyn Pugh and Bob Carroll, Jr.	January 21, 1954	February 22, 1954
Lucy bought another new hat. Ricky gets upset when he sees the price tag. Lucy complains that Ricky always loses his temper. Morris Williams (Byron Kane) calls Ricky and tells him he's found a Ventriloquist (Max Terhune) for his act. Ricky loses his temper when he hears how much the Ventriloquist wants to be paid. Ricky bets Lucy that he can control his temper longer than she can keep from buying a new hat. Ricky insists that Lucy take the hat back. However, while at Mrs. Mulford's (Madge Blake) hat store, Lucy cannot help herself and orders a new hat. She then attempts to get Ricky to lose his temper before the new hat is delivered. Ricky manages to keep his temper in check despite Lucy's best efforts. Fred brings back a golf club of Ricky's that he borrowed. It's all bent, but Ricky doesn't lose his temper. Morris calls again. Ricky ends up saving a large amount of money for the Ventriloquist by keeping his cool. He tells Lucy he will buy her a new hat himself as a thank you. However, the hat she ordered arrives at that very moment and Ricky realizes what was going on.
86	20	"Home Movies"	William Asher	Jess Oppenheimer, Madelyn Pugh and Bob Carroll, Jr.	January 28, 1954	March 1, 1954
Fred complains that Ricky's been showing home movies too much. Fred tells Ethel to keep the conversations going so Ricky can't bring up the movies. Ricky does wind up showing a movie anyway. When the movie is over and Ricky turns on the lights, Lucy is asleep and Fred and Ethel are gone. The next morning Fred and Ethel apologize to Ricky and claim they want to see more movies. Ricky says they don't have to watch any and that includes a TV pilot film he is going to make. He says he was going to have the three of them as actors, but he changed his mind. Days later Lucy tells Fred and Ethel that Ricky will be showing his film to Bennett Green (Stanley Farrar), a television producer. Lucy suggests they make their own film to show Bennett. Lucy thinks it should be a western drama. They get costumes and build a set. After they finish a scene, Lucy realizes she didn't put film in the camera. They do get their film finished. When Ricky refuses to let them show their film, Lucy splices their footage into Ricky's film. Although the final result is a mess, Bennett loves it anyway. Songs: Lucy and Vivian sing "I'm an Old Cowhand". Desi sings "Vaya con Dios".
87	21	"Bonus Bucks"	William Asher	Jess Oppenheimer, Madelyn Pugh and Bob Carroll, Jr.	February 4, 1954	March 8, 1954
Lucy and Ethel search their dollar bills for a newspaper's "Bonus Bucks" contest. There is a $300 prize. Fred and Ricky tell them they are wasting their time. After the girls leave, Fred and Ricky check their dollar bills. Ricky finds out that one of his dollars is the winning bill. He decides to plant it in Lucy's purse to let her find it herself. The next morning the Grocery Boy drops off some food. Lucy gets money out of her purse to pay him. Ethel comes by and says she has a winning dollar. The Grocery Boy gave to her as change for her delivery. Ricky comes by and tells Lucy about his surprise. They then realize that the dollar Ethel got was actually Lucy's. After some squabbling, the girls accidentally tear the bill in half. They decide to split the prize money. Lucy's half of the bill inadvertently gets sent to the laundry. The Ricardos go to the laundry to get it back before the contest is over. The Mertzes go to the newspaper to show them their half. It takes some doing but Ricky and Lucy succeed, but not before Lucy falls in the starch vat. That caused damage that requires nearly all the prize money to pay for. Frank Jaquet as Laundry Checker.
88	22	"Ricky's Hawaiian Vacation"	William Asher	Jess Oppenheimer, Madelyn Pugh and Bob Carroll, Jr.	February 11, 1954	March 22, 1954
Lucy is watching the "Be A Good Neighbor" show on TV. Ethel comes by with the mail. There's a letter for Ricky from Honolulu. Ricky tells Lucy and Ethel that his band got an offer to play there for one night. Lucy wants her and the Mertzes to go as well as entertainers, but Ricky says he can't afford it. Later, Ricky comes home and the place is decorated as a Hawaiian island. Lucy and Ethel perform for Ricky. Fred then joins them. While Ricky enjoyed what they did, he says he's losing money on the job as it is. Lucy writes Freddie Fillmore (Frank Nelson), of the "Be A Good Neighbor" show. Freddie comes by the Mertzes, who are posing as a poor couple. Lucy poses as Ethel's elderly mother. There is some confusion, but Lucy, Ethel and Fred wind up on the show. Lucy is surprised when Freddie brings out Ricky. As part of the stunt, Lucy has a lot of messy things poured on her. Ricky thwarts her fraudulent plan and there is no trip to Hawaii. Songs: Lucy and Vivian sing "King Kamehameha The Conqueror of the Islands". Lucy, Vivian and William sing "Hawaiian War Chant".
89	23	"Lucy Is Envious"	William Asher	Jess Oppenheimer, Madelyn Pugh and Bob Carroll, Jr.	February 16, 1954	March 29, 1954
Lucy reads in the paper that Cynthia Harcourt (Mary Jane Croft) is in town on a charity drive. Lucy went to school with her. Cynthia is apparently very wealthy. Wanting to impress Cynthia, Lucy told her that Ricky owned a sugar platation in Cuba. Cynthia calls Lucy and Ricky catches her putting on airs. Lucy pledges what she thinks will be $5. Lucy and Ethel are about to go to Cynthia's penthouse. Cynthia shows up at Lucy's place. Lucy lies and says that this is just their townhouse, they have a mansion in the country. Ethel pledges five as well. Lucy and Ethel then learn that Cynthia assumes they mean five hundred. Lucy and Ethel decide to earn the money and call about an ad in the paper. Al Sparks (Herb Vigran) comes by and tells them about a publicity stunt for a movie premier. They will portray women from Mars. Al has them go to the top of the Empire State Building and frighten some people. Fred tells Ricky that the radio says that aliens have landed. Al brings Lucy and Ethel home and pays them $500 each. Ricky sees this and comes up with a plan. He and Fred impersonate aliens themselves, frighten the girls and take the money from them. The guys do give the wives the money back. Dick Elliott as Henry.
90	24	"Lucy Writes a Novel"	William Asher	Jess Oppenheimer, Madelyn Pugh and Bob Carroll, Jr.	March 4, 1954	April 5, 1954
Lucy tells Ethel that she's writing a novel. She shows Ethel an article in the paper that says a housewife won a $10,000 prize for her first novel. Lucy says they will all be in the novel, but under a different name. Fred, Ethel and Ricky are curious as to how Lucy will portray them. When Lucy is gone, the three try to find the novel. Ricky finds it and they learn the title is "Real Gone with the Wind". The three do not like the way Lucy described them. They then burn the papers in the fireplace. Lucy shows them another copy she made. She says she also sent a copy to Dorrance and Company, publishers. Later, Ricky tells Lucy he doesn't believe anyone will publish the novel. Just then a registered letter from the publisher is delivered. They are going to publish the book and sent her $100 advanced royalty. Lucy starts writing another novel called "Sugar Cane Mutiny". The three say they are going to sue Lucy for libel. Lucy offers to split the royalties. Fred accepts, but Ricky and Ethel turn her down. Mr. Dorrance (Pierre Watkin) arrives. He says that his secretary made a mistake and they won't be publishing her novel. The next day Mr. Dorrance calls and tells Lucy another publisher, Mel Eaton (Dayton Lummis), is interested in her novel. Lucy tore up all her copies. They look through the trash and piece it all back together. Eaton calls and tells Lucy he wants to use her novel as an example of how not to write.
91	25	"Lucy's Club Dance"	William Asher	Jess Oppenheimer, Madelyn Pugh and Bob Carroll, Jr.	March 11, 1954	April 12, 1954
The Wednesday Afternoon Fine Arts League is holding a meeting. President Ethel says they need to raise some money. Caroline Appleby suggests having a dance. Lucy reminds the ladies that they would need an orchestra. She thinks she can get Ricky to play for free. Lucy calls him and he refuses. Caroline says they should form their own all-girl orchestra. Lucy volunteers to play the saxophone, but the girls know she doesn't play well. Lucy has a plan on how to get into the orchestra. They sound so terrible that Lucy convinces Ricky to give them some pointers, if they will let her play. Ricky tries to help the ladies, but they still sound horrible. Later, Ethel calls and tells Lucy to not let Ricky see the last page of the morning paper. There's an article about Ricky forming an all-girl orchestra, leading to unwanted publicity for him. Ricky does eventually see the article. He gets a call from his agent, who arranged to have the dance aired on TV. Lucy comes up with the idea to have the guys in Ricky's band dress as women.
92	26	"The Black Wig"	William Asher	Jess Oppenheimer, Madelyn Pugh and Bob Carroll, Jr.	March 25, 1954	April 19, 1954
Ricky, Lucy, Fred and Ethel come home after seeing an Italian movie. Lucy would love to look like one of the Italian actresses. Ricky forbids Lucy to cut her hair short in an Italian style haircut. Lucy goes to the beauty salon. Owner Doug (Douglas Evans) shows her an Italian wig that has short dark hair. Hairdresser Roberta (Eve McVeagh) has Lucy try the wig on. Lucy decides test Ricky's marital fidelity by pretending to be another woman and flirt with him. Ricky comes to pick Lucy up. He is tipped-off about Lucy's plan by Doug. Ricky pretends not to recognize Lucy and flirts back. Back at home, Lucy tells Ethel what happened. Ethel thinks Ricky recognized Lucy, but Lucy doesn't. Ethel would like to borrow the wig and try to fool Fred. Fred instantly recognizes Ethel. Lucy comes up with a plan. Ethel will get a different wig and outfit and Lucy will arrange a double date with Fred and Ricky. Ricky tells Fred about Lucy's trick. Lucy and Ethel go to the restaurant where they are to meet the men. The waiter says that the men left with two other women. The men come back and the wives realize they knew the truth all along.
93	27	"The Diner"	William Asher	Jess Oppenheimer, Madelyn Pugh and Bob Carroll, Jr.	March 18, 1954	April 26, 1954
Lucy tells Ethel that everything went wrong for Ricky at the club last night. Ricky wakes up in a bad mood. Ricky tells Fred that he's fed up with show business. If he can find another means of support, he's doing it. The Ricardos and the Mertzes decide to buy a diner from Mr. Watson (James Burke) and run it together. They name the place "Little Bit Of Cuba". The Mertzes struggle with all the difficult cooking, while Ricky and Lucy only serve as greeters. Fred and Ethel are fed up and tell Ricky and Lucy to get behind the counter. Fred and Ethel then leave. Lucy messes up all the orders and business really drops off. The Mertzes come back and ask if they all will share the work. Fred suggests that Ricky buy him out. After some arguing, they decide to split the diner down the middle, with each couple running their own restaurant. The Mertzes call their half "Big Hunk Of America". A Drunk (Fred Sherman) comes in and each couple try to get him to eat on their side. The two couples wind up throwing pies at each other. Mr. Watson buys the diner back.
94	28	"Tennessee Ernie Visits"	William Asher	Jess Oppenheimer, Madelyn Pugh and Bob Carroll, Jr.	April 1, 1954	May 3, 1954
Fred gives Lucy a special delivery letter. Lucy's mother writes to inform Lucy and Ricky that her friend's roommate's cousin's son Ernie Ford (Tennessee Ernie Ford) will be arriving from Tennessee to visit them in New York. Ernie arrives and tells Lucy and Ricky his long travel ordeals. Fred and Ethel come by and meet Ernie. To the Ricardos' surprise, Ernie has no place to stay and must sleep in their living room. Ernie wants to go to bed early in the evening, which Ricky is not used to. Ernie then wakes them up early in the morning. Lucy and Ricky learn that Ernie has no money and intends on staying with them. It's been several days and Lucy tells Ethel how much Ernie eats. Ernie ruins Ricky's maracas and Ricky wants him gone. Lucy reads Ricky a letter Ernie wrote to his mother. He has nothing but nice things to say about the Ricardos. Ernie also mentions that he hasn't seen a wicked painted city woman that his mother warned him about. Lucy hopes to scare Ernie away be dressing up that way. It has the opposite effect and Ernie chases Lucy around the apartment. Song: Tennessee Ernie Ford sings "Wabash Cannonball".
95	29	"Tennessee Ernie Hangs On"	William Asher	Jess Oppenheimer, Madelyn Pugh and Bob Carroll, Jr.	April 8, 1954	May 10, 1954
Lucy tells Ethel that they offered to buy Ernie a ticket home, but he won't except charity. Ricky shows Lucy a bus ticket he bought for Ernie. Instead of giving it to him, they'll have Ernie find it. Ernie finds the ticket in the hallway. He feels he should find the person that lost it. Ernie gives it to a man on the street. Ernie later destroys the TV set. Lucy comes up with a plan. She will tell Ernie that Ricky lost his job and they can't afford to feed him. Playing along, Fred and Ethel say that Lucy and Ricky will have to leave the apartment because they can't pay the rent. Ernie tells her that he'll go home. Later, he comes back telling Lucy he won't leave her in her time of need. Ernie collected food and some money from people to help Lucy. Ricky is furious. Ernie says that they are all going to perform on Millikan's Chicken Mash Hour. They will be paid $200 and he will then go home. Richard Reeves as TV Show Announcer. Song: Ernie, Lucy, Desi, Vivian and William perform "Y'All Come".
96	30	"The Golf Game"	William Asher	Jess Oppenheimer, Madelyn Pugh and Bob Carroll, Jr.	April 15, 1954	May 17, 1954
After Lucy gets Ricky golf clubs for their anniversary, Ricky and Fred take up golf as their hobby. It's all they can talk about. Lucy suggests that her and Ethel get a hobby to drive the men crazy. The girls start playing basketball in the apartment. This backfires when the men think it's a good idea. The girls then decide to play golf as well. Ricky worries that the girls might actually enjoy golf. To scare them off, the men invent complicated and bizarre rules for the game. Professional golfer Jimmy Demaret, appearing as himself, sets the women straight. Fred and Ricky will be playing in a tournament the next day. Lucy and Ethel ask Jimmy to help them teach the men a lesson.
97	31	"The Sublease"	William Asher	Jess Oppenheimer, Madelyn Pugh and Bob Carroll, Jr.	April 22, 1954	May 24, 1954
Lucy tells Fred and Ethel that Ricky's band has been booked in a summer resort in Maine for two months. Lucy and the baby will be going with. Ricky intends to sublet the apartment and spoke with real estate agent Mrs. Hammond (Virginia Brissac). The Ricardos and the Mertzs get into a bit of a disagreement. Ricky calls Mrs. Hammond and tells her not to send anyone else over as the Mertzs have turned down the last six couples. Mrs. Hammond comes by with Fred and Ethel, who will sublet the apartment and then sub-sublet it to someone else to make the money. Mrs. Hammond will find a tenant and she gets the two couples to agree to split the money. Mrs. Hammond rents the place to Mr. Beecher (Jay Novello). He was a witness at a murder trial and his nerves are shot. After the booking is canceled, the Ricardos need their apartment back, but Beecher refuses to leave. Ethel tells Lucy and Ricky they can move in with her and Fred until they find another place. Things get very uncomfortable for the two couples in the small apartment. Lucy comes up with a plan. Since Beecher was frightened because he witnessed a murder, they will scare him off by faking a murder. Beecher goes running off when Ethel pretends to shoot and kill Lucy. Fred says he found an apartment for Lucy and Ricky and paid two months rent in advance. Ricky then says his agent got the band another job and they will spend two months in California.

=== Season 4 (1954–55) ===
No. overall	No. in season	Title	Directed by	Written by	Film date	Original release date
98	1	"The Business Manager"	William Asher	Jess Oppenheimer, Madelyn Pugh and Bob Carroll, Jr.	June 17, 1954	October 4, 1954
Ethel tells Lucy that Fred found out she only paid half the rent. Lucy says her accounts are all messed up. She then learns the phone has been shut off. Lucy discovers the electricity has also been shut off. She tells Ricky she meant to pay the light bill. Tired of Lucy being unable to pay the bills, Ricky hires business manager Andrew Hickox (Charles Lane). Hickox gives Lucy five dollars a month as an allowance. He then arranges a line of credit for Lucy to charge her groceries at the store. Lucy comes up with a plan. She offers to buy groceries for everyone in her apartment building, secretly charging everything on her account and keeping all of the cash for herself. Ethel warns Lucy that at the end of the month, someone is going to have to pay that grocery bill. Ricky is surprised when he sees Lucy with a large wad of money. After something Fred says, Ricky wonders if Lucy is playing the stock market. Ricky sees a grocery note that Lucy wrote and thinks it's a stock symbol. He buys the stock and makes a lot of money. Ricky tells Lucy that he fired Hickox, because they can make money with Lucy's stock picks. Elizabeth Patterson as Mrs. Trumbull.
99	2	"Mertz and Kurtz"	William Asher	Jess Oppenheimer, Madelyn Pugh and Bob Carroll, Jr.	July 1, 1954	October 11, 1954
Ethel tells Lucy that Fred's world-traveling ex-vaudeville partner, Barney Kurtz (Charles Winninger), is coming for dinner. To impress Barney, Ethel talks Lucy into posing as their maid. During dinner, Fred lies and tells Barney that he owns several other apartment houses. Fred also says he has two cars and a chauffeur. Ricky comes by, and not knowing about Ethel's plan, he wonders why Lucy is pretending to be a maid. Fred confesses to Barney that he isn't that well off. Days later, Ethel and Lucy tell Fred and Ricky that they wired Barney's daughter and ask if Barney's grandson could stay with Ethel for a while to surprise Barney. Little Barney will arrive that day. Barney comes by and confesses that he is not as successful as he had been letting on. He is actually a cook in the Bronx. Barney has been exaggerating to impress his young grandson. Lucy and Ricky give Barney and Fred a part in Ricky's act at the Tropicana to keep up appearances for the boy. Songs: William and Charles sing "Oh By Jingo!" and "I Want a Girl (Just Like the Girl That Married Dear Old Dad)". Charles, Lucy, Vivian and William Frawley sing "I Found a Peach on the Beach", "By the Beautiful Sea" and "On the Boardwalk to Atlantic City". Desi sings "They Go Wild Simply Wild Over Me".
100	3	"Lucy Cries Wolf"	William Asher	Jess Oppenheimer, Madelyn Pugh and Bob Carroll, Jr.	June 3, 1954	October 18, 1954
Lucy sees in the paper about a woman who had been burglarized. She called her husband when she heard something, but he didn't come home until much later. Lucy tells Ricky that the husband didn't love his wife enough to come home right away. She asks Ricky if he would come home right away and he says he would. Later, to find out how much Ricky loves her, Lucy calls him during his rehearsal and says there was a bad looking man around the apartment. Fred and Ethel come by saying Ricky called them to check things out. They should call him if there is a problem. Fred and Ethel get mad when Lucy tells them her plot. Lucy messes up the apartment. She calls Ricky again and says the man is back. Lucy then hides on the outside ledge to make it appear she was kidnapped. Ricky and the Mertzes fall for it at first, but a neighbor, Mrs. DeVries, tips them off about Lucy being on the ledge. They get back at her by acting unconcerned about her disappearance, while making sure she overhears. Lucy comes back in the apartment and still claims there was a man there. Lucy later gets kidnapped for real and Ricky and the Mertzes overhear it, but do nothing because they think she is faking again. Lucy shows up gagged and tied up. She says there really were two men, but Ricky and the Mertzes ignore her. Fred Aldrich as Crook.
101	4	"The Matchmaker"	William Asher	Jess Oppenheimer, Madelyn Pugh and Bob Carroll, Jr.	June 10, 1954	October 25, 1954
Lucy invites her friend Dorothy Cook (Sarah Selby) and her long time boyfriend Sam Carter (Milton Frome) over for dinner. Lucy tells Ethel that she is going present Sam with a positive example of married and parenting life. Hopefully Sam will propose. Ricky comes home with a headache and is not looking forward to having company. Dorothy and Sam arrive and Lucy shows them the baby. After Lucy burns the dinner, Dorothy whips something up. Ricky has to turn in early as he has a recording session in the morning. Lucy wants him to stay up and they have a little argument. Ricky tells Sam some unpleasant things about being married. Fred and Ethel come by acting all romantic. Lucy and Ricky continue to argue and Sam and Dorothy leave. The next morning, Lucy serves Ricky a horrible breakfast. Lucy wants Ricky to apologize and they argue again. That night Ricky doesn't come home and Lucy is worried. She goes over to Ethel's place. Fred goes to Lucy's place to watch the baby and get some sleep. Lucy sees Ricky coming home with flowers and candy. Ricky apologizes to who he thinks is Lucy, but it's Fred. When he learns who he's talking to, Ricky gets mad and wants to leave. Dorothy and Sam end up getting married anyway and Lucy and Ricky patch things up in the end.
102	5	"Mr. and Mrs. TV Show"	William Asher	Jess Oppenheimer, Madelyn Pugh and Bob Carroll, Jr.	June 24, 1954	November 1, 1954*
Lucy tells Ethel that she and Carolyn went to lunch at the 21 Club. They wound up sitting with Harvey Cromwell (John Litel), who's part of a large advertising agency. Harvey said he was looking for a new TV personality and Lucy mentioned Ricky. Ricky has an appointment to meet Harvey tomorrow morning. Ricky comes home and Lucy tells him the news. She also says she would like to be on the show, but Ricky says no. Ricky goes to see Harvey and Harvey says the show's sponsor will be Phipps Department Store. Harvey wants to do a husband and wife show. Later, Ricky calls Harvey's assistant Mr. Taylor. The shows on the day after tomorrow, will be filmed in Ricky's apartment and will be called Breakfast with Ricky and Lucy. When Ricky tells Lucy, he makes it sounds as though her being on the show was his idea. Ricky and Lucy are rehearsing the show. Ricky introduces Fred and Ethel. Mr. Taylor says everything went well. Lucy is alone with Mr. Taylor and he says the idea for the show came from Harvey. Ricky was against it, but Harvey insisted. Lucy is not happy. The next day, Mr. Taylor says they will do a dress rehearsal. He tells Ricky it will actually be on the air. Not knowing this, Lucy insults the Phipps products. She then learns the show was on live. Songs: Lucy sings "Sweet Sue, Just You". Lucy, Vivian and William sing "Phipps Jingle". *Note: This episode's original scheduled network broadcast was pre-empted. It eventually aired on Monday, April 11, 1955 with a newly-filmed opening segment with Lucy in her Hollywood hotel room on the phone, introducing the events of the episode via flashback.
103	6	"Ricky's Movie Offer"	William Asher	Jess Oppenheimer, Madelyn Pugh and Bob Carroll, Jr.	September 16, 1954	November 8, 1954
Fred is putting a chain lock on Lucy's front door. Ethel saw in the paper about a crook posing as a door-to-door salesman and he'd get into places to rob them. Lucy forgot about a dentist appointment and rushes off, leaving Ethel to watch the baby. Ethel panics when a Hollywood talent scout named Ben Benjamin (Frank Nelson) comes to the door claiming to have an appointment with Ricky. Ethel starts screaming. Lucy comes home and hits Ben on the head with a bowl, knocking him out. Just then Ricky calls telling Lucy a man named Ben Benjamin is coming to see him. Ben comes to and Lucy and Ethel try to make it seem as though nothing happened. Ben wants Ricky to audition for a movie about the life of Don Juan. He gives Ricky a script and says he has a headache and will be back in a couple days. Ricky gets annoyed when Lucy keeps giving him tips on acting. Later Mrs. Trumbull comes by and hopes to audition for Mr. Benjamin. Grocery boy Pete (James Dobson) comes by and Lucy tells him there is no part for him. Pete says he plays the trumpet. Lucy, Ethel and Fred then hope to audition. Ben is arriving soon and Lucy, Ethel and Fred are all made up. Pete shows up playing his trumpet. Then Mrs. Trumbull arrives. Ricky calls and tells Lucy that he read for Ben at his hotel and he will get a screen test. Songs: Elizabeth Patterson sings "Ah, Sweet Mystery of Life" and "Cielito Lindo". Vivian and William sing "Habanera". James Dobson performs "In a Little Spanish Town".
104	7	"Ricky's Screen Test"	William Asher	Jess Oppenheimer, Madelyn Pugh and Bob Carroll, Jr.	September 23, 1954	November 15, 1954
Lucy tries to teach little Ricky how to dance and act so he can be in show business. Lucy starts to tell people her and Ricky will be moving to Hollywood. Ricky reminds her that nothing is definite yet. Fred shows Lucy and Ethel that Ricky made the cover of Variety. When Lucy hears about all the beautiful actresses that may work with Ricky, she suddenly doesn't want him to become famous. To get Lucy to change her mind again, Ricky mentions that he needs a woman to do the screen test with. Now Lucy starts acting as though she's a movie star. Ricky tries to bring Lucy to her senses by telling her that they will only see the back of her head during the screen test. After a rehearsal, the Director (Clinton Sundberg) says they will do a take. This time instead of keeping her back to the camera, Lucy turns her head several times. Even after the Director tells her to stop it, Lucy keeps turning towards the camera. During the final take, Lucy still keeps turning around. The Director says that she was never in the shot, he kept the camera on Ricky's face. Ray Kellogg as Assistant Director. Song: Desi sings "Canta Guitarra".
105	8	"Lucy's Mother-In-Law"	William Asher	Jess Oppenheimer, Madelyn Pugh and Bob Carroll, Jr.	September 30, 1954	November 22, 1954
Ricky is rehearsing at the club and Lucy comes by. He asks if she's heard about the screen test and she says no. Lucy brought him a letter from his mother (Mary Emery). She is coming from Cuba for a visit. Lucy is concerned as she has never met her. Ricky is auditioning Professor Bonanova (Fortunio Bonanova), a mind reader. Lucy is surprised when Bonanova guesses a couple things that she told his assistant. Bonanova explains how it's done with a short wave radio. Back at home, Lucy is trying to clean the place up. Ethel comes in and says she saw Ricky's mother getting out of a cab. Lucy apologizes for the messy house, but then learns that Mother Ricardo doesn't speak English. Ricky finally comes home and is able to translate for the two. After a couple days, Lucy tells Ethel that everything has gone wrong and she's making a bad impression. Lucy is worried about a party they will be having that night. Knowing that Bonanova speaks Spanish, she wants to have him and his short wave radio help her speak to the party guests. Bonanova will hide in the kitchen The guests arrive and Ricky is stunned that Lucy is speaking Spanish. Ethel comes in the kitchen and tells Bonanova that his daughter just had a baby boy. He leaves. Ricky learns from Ethel about Lucy's trick. Mother Ricardo thinks it was very nice that Lucy went to all that trouble just to please her. Rodolfo Hoyos Jr. as Party Guest. Song: Desi sings "Bim Bam Boom". Note: William Frawley does not appear in this episode, but his voice is heard off-screen calling for Ethel.
106	9	"Ethel's Birthday"	William Asher	Jess Oppenheimer, Madelyn Pugh and Bob Carroll, Jr.	October 7, 1954	November 29, 1954
Ethel mentions to Lucy that her birthday is coming up and she knows she'll get another terrible present from Fred. Lucy invites Ethel and Fred over for dinner. Her and Ethel try to subtly bring up the birthday. Ricky thinks it's Lucy's birthday and gives her a present. Lucy says her birthday is months away and Ricky says this is his emergency present. Fred says he knows it's Ethel's birthday that's coming up. Ricky says that their present to Ethel will be dinner and a night at the theater. Later, Fred asks Lucy to choose something special for him to give Ethel for her birthday. Lucy tells Ethel that Ricky got tickets to the popular play "Over the Teacups". Lucy gives Fred the present and he puts it in the closet. Ethel finds it and Lucy says she should peek inside the box. Lucy is insulted when Ethel doesn't like the pants inside. Lucy confesses that she pick out the gift and they get into an argument. They refuse to go to the theater together. The men trick the wives by saying they got different tickets and won't be sitting together. At the theater, Lucy and Ethel are not happy when they find they are sitting next to each other. The men finally have to separate them. The play is about friendship and Lucy and Ethel make up. Charles Cane as Theater Patron. Bess Flowers as Theater Patron.
107	10	"Ricky's Contract"	William Asher	Jess Oppenheimer, Madelyn Pugh and Bob Carroll, Jr.	October 14, 1954	December 6, 1954
Fred and Ethel come by Lucy's for the rent money. Lucy tells them that Ricky hasn't heard about his screen test. She says that Ricky is frantic. The three try to get Ricky's mind on something else, with no luck. Even at rehearsal at the club, Ricky sits by the phone. Ethel is babysitting while Lucy is at the beauty parlor. Ethel takes messages from the calls that Lucy is getting. Believing he'll get the part anyway and to calm Ricky down, Fred writes a note saying that Ricky got the job. This despite the call still has yet to come. Lucy reads the note and leaves a message for Ricky at the club. Ethel suddenly remembers she didn't tear up that message. Fred and Ethel go to tell Lucy there was no call from Hollywood. The three decide to tell Ricky the truth when he gets home. Ricky arrives all excited about going to Hollywood. Fred and Ethel start to leave, but Lucy makes them stay. Ricky tells them he talked to Mr. Benjamin and he actually did get the job. Songs: Lucy, Vivian and William sing "When You're Smiling". Desi sings "I'm on my way to Cuba". Note: This episode was, according to a CBS press release of August 14, 1954, to be broadcast in color, but ultimately plans to film it in color were abandoned.
108	11	"Getting Ready"	William Asher	Jess Oppenheimer, Madelyn Pugh and Bob Carroll, Jr.	October 21, 1954	December 13, 1954
Lucy wants to fly to Hollywood, but Ricky wants to take a bus or a train. Ricky gives in and starts to make the phone call. Lucy then says they will take a train. Ricky calls for a train reservation and Lucy says they should take a bus. Lucy then suggests driving so they can see the sights. Fred and Ethel come by and Ethel is sad because Lucy is leaving. Lucy says they are only going for a month. Lucy invites the Mertzes to come along. They all get into an argument when the subject of splitting the cost of the gas comes up, but they work it out. Ricky and Lucy have been looking for a car with no luck. However, when Fred is tasked with buying the car for the trip, he ends up buying a dilapidated antique. Parts start falling off the car and Fred is told to get their money back. Lucy, Ricky, and Ethel scheme to trick the car dealer into thinking they are with a TV show and are looking for a vintage car. The plan backfires when Fred learns from his car dealer friend about the TV show and gets the phone number to sell the car himself.
109	12	"Lucy Learns To Drive"	William Asher	Jess Oppenheimer, Madelyn Pugh and Bob Carroll, Jr.	October 28, 1954	January 3, 1955
Ethel tells Lucy that Fred is still in a state of shock that he messed up the car deal. Ricky comes home and says he bought a brand new Pontiac for the trip to California. Ricky used the old car as a trade in and Fred will get his money back. They all go outside to look at the car. Lucy wants to go for a ride, but Ricky says the car isn't insured yet. Lucy asks Ricky to teach her how to drive. Believing the car is now insured, he reluctantly agrees to do it. The first lesson does not go well. Lucy wants to teach Ethel how to drive, but mentions that she hasn't talked to the insurance man yet. Ethel drives the Pontiac into the old one and the cars lock bumpers. Lucy hopes to drive the old one with the Pontiac attached to the garage to have them fixed before Ricky gets home. Lucy comes back later with the old car attached to the back of the Pontiac. Lucy has an elaborate explanation as to how it happened. Ricky and Fred come home and are not happy. When Lucy explains what happened, Ricky actually starts laughing. Ricky tells Fred he's not worried, because he called the man and he's insured.
110	13	"California, Here We Come!"	William Asher	Jess Oppenheimer, Madelyn Pugh and Bob Carroll, Jr.	November 4, 1954	January 10, 1955
Lucy is trying to draw out the route to Los Angeles that includes every sight each person wants to see. Lucy gets a letter from her mother stating that she wants to go on the trip to California with them. Ricky comes home, overhears Lucy talking to Ethel about her mother, and starts yelling at Lucy. Just then Mrs. McGillicuddy (Kathryn Card) walks in. Mother tells them that she wrote a book about her family. She hopes to sell her story and have it made into a movie. Mother keeps calling Ricky Micky. Ricky starts complaining about all the extra guests, including the Mertzes, which Ethel overhears. Fred and Ethel come by and tell Ricky and Lucy that they are not going on the trip. Mother thinks she's the reason the Mertzes aren't going and now says she's not going. Eventually everything gets sorted out. The next morning, Ricky and Fred start packing the car. It's not long before they realize that everything is not going to fit. When Mother learns that the trip will take two weeks, she decides that she and Little Ricky will take a plane. Song: Desi, Lucy, Vivian and William sing "California, Here I Come".
111	14	"First Stop"	William Asher	Jess Oppenheimer, Madelyn Pugh and Bob Carroll, Jr.	November 11, 1954	January 17, 1955
After a long day of non-stop driving, the Ricardos and the Mertzes are getting hungry. They finally pull into "One Oak Cabins and Cafe", a run-down establishment near Cincinnati. The proprietor, George Skinner (Olin Howland), says he has nothing to eat but cheese sandwiches. The sandwiches wind up being stale and expensive. It's late and Ricky is tired of driving, so Lucy takes over. She follows signs that supposedly lead to another motel, but it leads them back to the same place. As they are all very tired, they decide to spend the night there. Skinner offers the foursome accommodation in a shabby single-room cabin with bathroom. A train goes by and the whole cabin shakes. This happens constantly. The couples decide to leave. There's a string attached to the car. When Ricky snaps the string, an alarm goes off. They then discover the car's steering wheel is missing. Skinner agrees to not charge them for the room. But he makes them pay the same price for the steering wheel. Song: Olin Howland sings "I'm Afraid to Come Home in the Dark".
112	15	"Tennessee Bound"	William Asher	Jess Oppenheimer, Madelyn Pugh and Bob Carroll, Jr.	November 18, 1954	January 24, 1955
Lucy gets lost while driving and ends up in Tennessee. Ricky races through Bent Fork in an attempt to avoid running into their friend "Cousin" Ernie Ford (Tennessee Ernie Ford). Ricky gets pulled over and they are brought to the Court House. Ricky thinks he should just plead guilty and pay the fine. Lucy's defiant attitude upsets the Town Sheriff (Will Wright) and he puts her in jail. The Sheriff gives Lucy 24 hours. When he learns she knows Ernie, who jilted one of his daughters, Lucy gets 48 hours. Ernie soon arrives to help. He gives them files to get Lucy out of jail. The Sheriff has a change of heart and decides to let Lucy out, but then he sees some of the bars sawed off. Now he puts them all in jail. To get them out of trouble, Ernie tells the others that he'll marry Teensy (Marilyn Borden). The Sheriff brings Teensy and Weensy (Rosalyn Borden) to the jail. Ernie tells the others that he proposed, but Teensy turned him down. Seems he accidentally grabbed Weensy's hand. Because the twins want to get into show business, Ernie told them that Ricky would take them to Hollywood. Ricky tells him he can't do that. The Sheriff wants to throw a party for the girls to celebrate. Ernie comes up with a plan to free his friends. Aaron Spelling as Gas Station Man. Songs: Lucy, Desi, Vivian, William and Ernie sing "Old MacDonald Had a Farm". Ernie performs "Down in the Valley" and "Ernie's Square Dance". Marilyn and Rosalyn perform "Ricochet Romance".
113	16	"Ethel's Home Town"	William Asher	Jess Oppenheimer, Madelyn Pugh and Bob Carroll, Jr.	November 25, 1954	January 31, 1955
The Ricardos and the Mertzes arrive in Ethel's home town of Albuquerque, New Mexico to visit and stay with her father, Will Potter (Irving Bacon). Will and Fred don't really get along. Will tells Ethel that her old friend Bill Hackett (Chick Chandler) is now the editor of the local paper. Will says that Bill will be coming by because of the celebrity that came to town. Ricky thinks he's talking about him. Lucy, Ricky, and Fred are surprised when they learn Will is talking about Ethel. Will was lead to believe by Ethel that she was the star headed for Hollywood. Bill arrives and he wants Ethel's story and she plays along. Ethel is asked to give an impromptu performance before leaving. The next day, there is a big article about Ethel in the paper. Ricky, Lucy and Fred are upset that Ethel didn't even try to get them in the show. They decide to teach her a lesson. That night while Ethel is singing, they perform behind her, which she is unaware of. Ethel is not happy when she finally sees them. Bill now wants a picture of all four of them. Songs: William performs "Chopsticks". Vivian sings "Shortnin' Bread" and "My Hero".
114	17	"L.A. at Last"	William Asher	Jess Oppenheimer, Madelyn Pugh and Bob Carroll, Jr.	December 2, 1954	February 7, 1955
The Ricardos and the Mertzes finally arrive in Hollywood. Ricky calls Mr. Sherman (Dayton Lummis), the Producer at the studio, and sets up a meeting. Lucy and the Mertzes go star-hunting at the Brown Derby restaurant. While there, Ethel has an interaction with Eve Arden. Lucy annoys William Holden by staring at him from behind a potted plant. He starts staring back at her. Lucy then accidentally gets him hit in the face with a pie. Ricky later meets Holden and brings him to their hotel room to meet Lucy. To avoid being recognized, she wears a fake nose made of putty. Lucy winds up setting it on fire and has to remove it. Holden makes up a cover story for Ricky to show Lucy there are no hard feelings. Harry Bartell as Waiter. Bob Jellison as Bobby the Bellboy. Danni Sue Nolan as Secretary.
115	18	"Don Juan and the Starlets"	William Asher	Jess Oppenheimer, Madelyn Pugh and Bob Carroll, Jr.	December 9, 1954	February 14, 1955
Lucy tells Ethel that Ricky called and he will be bringing a photographer to the hotel. Lucy hopes to be in the pictures. An attractive young woman named Dolores Donlon comes to the room. Then Maggie McGinnis shows up and two more women. They claim to be sent from the studio to take pictures with Ricky. Ricky and Ross the Publicity Man (Ross Elliott) arrive. Ross starts taking pictures and Lucy keeps trying to get in them. Later, Lucy is upset until Ricky tells her that Ross gave him two tickets to a movie premiere. They will get dressed up and go tonight. Lucy sees that there is actually only one ticket. Ross comes by and tells Ricky he's going to the premiere with the four starlets. That night Ricky comes home very late and Lucy is sleeping on the couch. Lucy is still asleep when Ricky leaves for the studio early in the morning. The Maid (Iva Shepard) comes by and makes up Ricky's bed. Lucy finally wakes up and thinks Ricky was out all night. Fred tries to cover up for Ricky by telling Lucy he slept at their room. Thanks to Ethel, Lucy learns that wasn't true. Ricky arrives and tries to tell them that he did come home last night. The Maid comes by again and is able to verify Ricky slept there.
116	19	"Lucy Gets Into Pictures"	William Asher	Jess Oppenheimer, Madelyn Pugh and Bob Carroll, Jr.	December 16, 1954	February 21, 1955
Ricky tries to talk Lucy out of wanting to be in a movie. Fred and Ethel tell them they ran into Jimmy O'Connor, an old vaudeville friend. Jimmy gave Fred and Ethel parts in his new movie. Bobby the Bellboy tells Lucy he has a part in a movie. Ricky arranges for Lucy to appear as a murdered showgirl in a film from his studio MGM. But the role and the costume are more than she can handle. Her big scene ends up being changed and she is only seen on camera covered with a sheet. Director Frank Williams gets upset when he discovers that Lucy wrote her name on the bottom of her shoes so her friends will know it's her.
117	20	"The Fashion Show"	William Asher	Jess Oppenheimer, Madelyn Pugh and Bob Carroll, Jr.	December 23, 1954	February 28, 1955
Lucy would really like to own a Don Loper gown. Ricky agrees to her getting one dress and only spending $100. At the store, Amzie the Salesgirl (Amzie Strickland) shows Lucy and Ethel some dresses. They are priced higher than Lucy hoped. Lucy tells Ethel about a "Hollywood Wives" fashion show that will be held at the store. Lucy finds a way to be in the show after meeting Don Loper and Sheila MacRae. Lucy winds up with a dress costing $500 and Ricky wants her to take it back. Lucy gets a bad sunburn. Don Loper calls Lucy and tells her there's a slight problem. If she wears a different dress, he will let her keep the dress she took home for free. At the show, Lucy is modeling a dress made of tweed and it is really irritating her sunburn. When Lucy gets home, Ricky had a change of heart and left her a check for $500. Sue Carol and Brenda Marshall appear.
118	21	"The Hedda Hopper Story"	William Asher	Jess Oppenheimer, Madelyn Pugh and Bob Carroll, Jr.	February 3, 1955	March 14, 1955
Ricky is upset that his name hasn't been mentioned in Hedda Hopper's celebrity gossip column. There is a lot of confusion, but Lucy's mother arrives in California with the baby. Ricky meets with Charlie Pomerantz (Hy Averback), his new Publicity Agent. Charlie concocts a publicity stunt designed to get Hedda to write about Ricky. They plan for Ricky to "save" Lucy from drowning in the hotel pool. The next day Mrs. McGillicuddy tells Ricky and Lucy that she invited a woman she met on the plane over for tea. Lucy apologizes that they won't be able to meet her because they will be doing their publicity stunt. At the pool, Charlie finds a way to get rid of the Lifeguard (John Hart). Lucy and Ricky end up doing the stunt before Hopper arrives. They go back to their apartment. Turns out the woman that Mrs. McGillicuddy met was Hedda and she is there. Hedda has to leave because she is supposed to be at the party by the pool. Songs: Kathryn Card sings "The Sheik of Araby". Desi sings "Cuban Pete".
119	22	"Don Juan Is Shelved"	William Asher	Jess Oppenheimer, Madelyn Pugh and Bob Carroll, Jr.	February 10, 1955	March 21, 1955
Lucy finds out from a Variety article that MGM has shelved Ricky's film Don Juan. At first Ricky thinks the story is just some publicy, but then he gets a call that his screen test was cancelled. Lucy schemes with her mother and the Mertzes to create public demand for Ricky's talent by writing a lot of fan mail. Producer Dore Schary was supposed to come to see Ricky at the apartment, but he's running late. Lucy wants to have someone portray a fake talent scout interested in Ricky to make Schary worried. However, that someone inadvertently ends up actually being Schary, but he finds the plan so hilarious he goes along with it. Schary tells Lucy his name is George Spellman. When the truth comes out, Schary informs Ricky that the studio is indeed shelving Don Juan. They want to keep Ricky under contract and will star him in a film as soon as they can find the right one. Bobby the Bellboy brings Lucy all the fan mail back, because there are no stamps on them. Vivian Vance's then-husband, Philip Ober, appears as Schary. John Hart as Jim Stevens.
120	23	"Bull Fight Dance"	William Asher	Jess Oppenheimer, Madelyn Pugh and Bob Carroll, Jr.	February 17, 1955	March 28, 1955
Ross (Ross Elliott), the Publicity Agent, tells Lucy he got Ricky an article in Photoplay magazine. Ross wants Lucy to write answers to questions about what it is like to be married to Ricky. Ricky is worried about what Lucy will write. Ross calls and tells Lucy that Ricky will MC the "Heart Fund" TV show. Lucy tries to find a way to be on the show, but Ross isn't interested. Lucy blackmails Ricky into letting her appear. Ricky lets Fred and Ethel be in the show. However, Lucy's singing skills are not up to par and Ricky says there is no other part in the show for her. Lucy blackmails Ricky again. Ricky arranges for her to wear a bull costume for his bull fight number. Lucy changes things up and makes the bull light-hearted and lovable. Ray Kellogg as Propman. Songs: Lucy sings "Let Me Go, Lover!". Lucy and Desi perform "Humoresque" and "Old Folks at Home (Swanee River)". William and Vivian sing "Dear Old Donegal". Desi sings "Fernando the Fearless, That's Me".
121	24	"Hollywood Anniversary"	William Asher	Jess Oppenheimer, Madelyn Pugh and Bob Carroll, Jr.	February 24, 1955	April 4, 1955
Lucy mentions that she'll be celebrating her wedding anniversary here in California. Ricky has forgotten the date, but he has a plan to convince Lucy that he knew it all along. Ricky says that he had planned an anniversary party at the Mocambo nightclub for that night. During the middle of the night, Ricky calls Western Union to send a wire to the head of the license bureau in Greenwich, CT for the date. Ricky does get the wire and is able to tell Lucy the date is the 7th. But now he has to try and get the party scheduled. Ricky calls Publicity Man Ross and asks him to get something in the paper about the party. Lucy sees the article in the paper about the party and it has a long list of celebrities that will be attending. Lucy tells Ricky that Fred and Ethel wonder why they didn't get a formal invitation. Lucy finds the wire and Ricky admits he forgot the date and there will be no celebrities at the party. Lucy refuses to go to the party with Ricky and the Mertzes. Mrs. McGillicuddy suggests that Lucy have her own party at the club. Lucy takes her mother and Bobby the Bellboy. At the club, Ricky tells the audience about how he forgot his anniversary and asks Lucy's forgiveness. Lucy and Ricky wind up dancing together. Song: Desi performs "The Anniversary Waltz".
122	25	"The Star Upstairs"	William Asher	Jess Oppenheimer, Madelyn Pugh and Bob Carroll, Jr.	March 3, 1955	April 18, 1955
Lucy and Ethel are talking about the 99 movie stars they've already seen. Ethel sees in the paper that a star is staying at a local hotel. Bobby the Bellboy lets it slip that Cornel Wilde is staying here. Lucy blackmails Bobby into letting her use his bellboy uniform so she can get a look at Cornel. Lucy does get into Cornel's room, but he is in the bathtub. Later, Bobby brings Cornel his lunch on a cart covered with a table cloth. Lucy is hiding in the cart. When Cornel hears Lucy's voice, he thinks Bobby is doing a ventriloquist act. Lucy gets out from under the cart and gets locked on Cornel's balcony. There are some problems, but Lucy gets to her balcony. Ricky calls Lucy and says he's in Cornel's room and she should come up to meet him. By the time Lucy changes, Ricky comes back and says that Cornel moved to another hotel. Cornel thought there was a prowler in his room. Note: William Frawley does not appear in this episode.
123	26	"In Palm Springs"	William Asher	Jess Oppenheimer, Madelyn Pugh and Bob Carroll, Jr.	March 17, 1955	April 25, 1955
Lucy reads in the paper that Rock Hudson is in Palm Springs. The two couples point out each others annoying habits. Lucy thinks that they are snapping at each other because they've spent too much time together on this trip. Instead of the two couples going to Palm Springs together, it's decided that Lucy, her mother, Ethel, and Little Ricky will go. When they get to Palm Springs, it's raining and they're stuck inside. Lucy and Ethel start to get on each others nerves. They miss the husbands. It's also raining in Hollywood and the men are snapping at each other. The men admit they miss the wives. Dore Schary's secretary calls and wants Ricky to come to Palm Springs. Lucy and Ethel are by the pool. Ricky and Fred point them out to Rock Hudson. Rock joins the ladies. Something Rock says makes the ladies really want to see the husbands. Ricky and Fred join them. Turns out it was Lucy who posed as Schary's secretary.
124	27	"The Dancing Star"	William Asher	Jess Oppenheimer, Madelyn Pugh and Bob Carroll, Jr.	March 31, 1955	May 2, 1955
Lucy is worried because Carolyn Appleby (Doris Singleton), one of her friends from New York, is coming for a visit. Lucy may have led Carolyn to believe that she knows a lot of movie stars personally. Ethel mentions that Van Johnson is performing at the hotel and he is sleeping down by the pool. Lucy will go down there and pretend to be talking to him. When Carolyn shows up, Ethel will show her Lucy and Van together. Lucy gets back to the room and Carolyn says she lost her glasses on the plane and can't see that far. Lucy makes up a story that Van asked her to rehearse with him this afternoon. She said this because Van's partner has red hair also and from a distance Carolyn will think it's Lucy. The airline found Carolyn's glasses and sent them to her. Lucy now panics. After Lucy tells him she's seen his show fourteen times, Van agrees to help Lucy. Carolyn is very impressed. Later, Ricky doesn't believe that Lucy danced with Van. Van calls Ricky. Because his partner is sick, Van would like Lucy to fill in. Later, Lucy's bragging gets her in trouble again. Song: Lucy and Van Johnson perform "How About You?".
125	28	"Harpo Marx"	William Asher	Jess Oppenheimer, Madelyn Pugh and Bob Carroll, Jr.	March 24, 1955	May 9, 1955
Before Carolyn leaves Hollywood, she wants to see all of the celebrities that Lucy claimed would show up for a get-together. Lucy decides to get masks of celebrities to fool near-sighted Carolyn. When Carolyn shows up, Lucy and Ethel manage to get her glasses away from her. Dressing up with masks of Clark Gable, Gary Cooper, Jimmy Durante, and other celebrities, Lucy manages to fool Carolyn. Meanwhile, Ricky and Fred are by the pool when Harpo Marx shows up. As a favor, Ricky asks Harpo to go to see Lucy and Carolyn. He goes to their apartment and Ethel thinks it's Lucy. Harpo leaves and not long after Lucy arrives dressed as Harpo. Harpo returns to play his harp and Lucy hides. After Carolyn leaves, Harpo and Lucy have an amusing confrontation. Ricky shows up dressed as Groucho and Fred as Chico Marx. Song: Harpo performs "Take Me Out to the Ball Game".
126	29	"Ricky Needs an Agent"	William Asher	Jess Oppenheimer, Madelyn Pugh and Bob Carroll, Jr.	April 7, 1955	May 16, 1955
Growing tired of Ricky's constant publicity appearances, Lucy fears that MGM will never give him a film. Lucy tells Ricky to put his foot down about a movie role. Fred says that Ricky needs an agent. Lucy is going to pretend to be Ricky's agent, but Ethel thinks she should stay out of it. Lucy goes to see studio executive Walt Reilly (Parley Baer). Reilly tells her that they are having a hard time finding the right part for Ricky. Lucy tells him she just came back from New York where some producers want to star Ricky in a Broadway Musical. Reilly doesn't want to stand in Ricky's way, so they will release him from his contract. Lucy tries to get Reilly to change his mind, but it doesn't work. Ricky comes home and Lucy tells him what happened. Ricky is furious and starts smashing things. Ricky leaves and Lucy is laying on the ground picking up things. Fred and Ethel come in and think Ricky killed Lucy. Lucy calls Reilly and tells him there is a woman going around pretending to be Ricky's agent. Reilly tells Lucy he'll keep Ricky under contract. Ricky comes home and says he got an agent who got him a job at another studio for three times the money. Ricky then tells Lucy he was just kidding. He called MGM and found out everything was straightened out. Helen Kleeb as Miss Klein.
127	30	"The Tour"	William Asher	Jess Oppenheimer, Madelyn Pugh and Bob Carroll, Jr.	April 14, 1955	May 30, 1955
Ricky forbids Lucy from joining him for lunch with Richard Widmark at Romanoff's. Ricky lists some of the things Lucy has done to embarrass him since they've been in Hollywood. Ethel suggests her and Lucy take a bus tour of movie stars' homes in Beverly Hills. On the bus, Lucy and Ethel keep switching seats to find the best views. The girls wind up annoying the Bus Driver (Benny Rubin). The tour goes to Richard Widmark's house. Lucy tells the passengers that her husband is having lunch with Widmark. Lucy sees grapefruit trees in Widmark's backyard and would like to pick one. Lucy and Ethel get off the bus and the bus drives away. Lucy climbs the garden wall and then falls in the yard. She can't get back up the wall. Lucy tells Ethel she'll sneak through the house and go out the front door. Because the maid is around, Lucy can't get out. Lucy hears Widmark and Ricky arriving. They find her hiding under a bear skin rug. Lucy tries to explain how she got there. Barbara Pepper as Woman on Bus. Jack Tornek as Bus Passenger.

=== Season 5 (1955–56) ===
No. overall	No. in season	Title	Directed by	Written by	Film date	Original release date
128	1	"Lucy Visits Grauman's"	James V. Kern	Jess Oppenheimer, Madelyn Pugh, Bob Carroll, Jr., Bob Schiller and Bob Weiskopf	September 9, 1955	October 3, 1955
Ricky has completed his movie for MGM and Lucy and the Mertzes want to throw him a wrap party. Ricky is looking forward to going home. Lucy and the Mertzes convince him to let them stay in Hollywood for one more week. While sight-seeing, Lucy discovers that the cement slab with John Wayne's footprints and signature in front of Grauman's Chinese Theater has become loose. Lucy talks Ethel into helping her steal the slab to keep as a souvenir, but Fred is against it. When the husbands go to sleep, Lucy and Ethel sneak over to Grauman's. Fred comes by and catches them. Fred sees two policeman coming. They set the slab back down and hide. While hiding, Lucy gets her foot caught in a bucket of cement. They get Lucy and the slab back to the Mertzes hotel room. Ricky finds out about Lucy's foot. He does get Lucy's foot out of the cement. Ricky demands that they return the slab to the theater forecourt. While trying to return it, Lucy and Ethel accidentally destroy it. Lucy winds up siting in a bucket of cement. GeGe Pearson as Tourist.
129	2	"Lucy and John Wayne"	James V. Kern	Jess Oppenheimer, Madelyn Pugh, Bob Carroll, Jr., Bob Schiller and Bob Weiskopf	September 15, 1955	October 10, 1955
Lucy reads in the paper that the police have been called to investigate the missing cement slab of John Wayne's footprints and signature. Two women were seen loitering there. Lucy tries to prevent Ricky from seeing the paper, but he does. Ricky calls the manager at Grauman's. To avoid any bad publicity for Ricky, he needs to bring the slab back tonight. Grauman's is premiering John's new movie. Ricky gets John to help by having him create a duplicate slab with his footprints and signature to replace it. Lucy and Ethel see the slab. Lucy thinks it's a fake and she wipes it flat. She then learns it was real. Ricky gets John to come back. Lucy and Ethel are embarrassed because they have curlers in their hair. John leaves for the studio and the others are shocked when they see Little Ricky messed up the new slab. Ricky goes to the studio and John makes him one more slab. Something Lucy and Ethel do causes Ricky to mess up the new slab. There are more problems and confusion. In the end, John makes them four slabs.
130	3	"Lucy and the Dummy"	James V. Kern	Jess Oppenheimer, Madelyn Pugh, Bob Carroll, Jr., Bob Schiller and Bob Weiskopf	September 22, 1955	October 17, 1955
Ricky frightens Lucy with a dummy of his head the studio made for trick shots. Ricky tells her he made arrangements to go deep-sea fishing tomorrow morning. Lucy gets a call from Chip Jackson at MGM. They would like Ricky to help entertain executives at a studio party tomorrow night. Ricky tells Lucy no as he's going fishing. Lucy lies and tells Chip Ricky will do it if his wife can perform with him. Lucy tries to talk Ricky into going to the party, but he refuses. The next morning Ricky leaves and Lucy comes up with an idea. She shows Fred and Ethel a dummy she made with the dummy head of Ricky and she dances with it. They agree to help Lucy. At the studio party, Lucy and Ricky are introduced by Chip and Lucy dances with the dummy. Things start to go wrong for Lucy and eventually the dummy's head falls off. The next day Ricky comes home. Ethel and Fred tell him that the executives at the party thought Lucy had a funny comedy act and offered her a contract. Ricky has to find a way to have Lucy turn down the offer. Ricky pretends to be happy and tells Lucy that he and Little Ricky will think about her all the time back in New York. Lucy decides she wants to be with her family. Song: Lucy sings "I Get Ideas". Note: In the original broadcast of this episode, there was an additional scene at the studio party before Lucy comes on stage, in which the audience was given a preview of the musical number "Adelaide" from MGM's upcoming film Guys and Dolls.
131	4	"Ricky Sells the Car"	James V. Kern	Jess Oppenheimer, Madelyn Pugh, Bob Carroll, Jr., Bob Schiller and Bob Weiskopf	September 29, 1955	October 24, 1955
The Ricardos and the Mertzes will be heading back to New York in a couple days. Ricky calls Lucy from the studio and tells her he sold the car. Lucy wonders how they will get back home and Ricky tells her by train. He'll have the tickets sent to the apartment. Lucy tells Fred and Ethel about the train ride. The Messenger drops off the tickets and there are only three. Fred and Ethel get upset feeling they have been stranded in Hollywood. Ricky comes home and then realizes he forgot tickets for the Mertzes. Fred bought a motorcycle to drive home with. Fred wrecks the motorcycle. Ricky tells them that he will buy the train tickets for them. Fred wants Ricky to pay for the motorcycle and the two get into a little argument. Just to prove Ricky will buy more tickets, Lucy gives Fred and Ethel her tickets. Later, Ricky tells Lucy he got tickets for the Mertzes, but they are a lower class. Lucy tells Ricky about their tickets that she gave to the Mertzes. There is much more confusion, but things work out. Don Brodie as Ticket Agent.
132	5	"The Great Train Robbery"	James V. Kern	Jess Oppenheimer, Madelyn Pugh, Bob Carroll, Jr., Bob Schiller and Bob Weiskopf	October 6, 1955	October 31, 1955
The Ricardos and the Mertzes get on the train. Lucy realizes she left her purse with the tickets by the newsstand outside. Ricky goes to get it. Sam the Porter (Sam McDaniel) tells Lucy the train is about to leave. The train starts to move and Lucy tells the Conductor (Frank Nelson) to stop the train. When he won't, Lucy pulls the train's emergency brake. The Conductor confronts Lucy about stopping the train and Ricky does get on. The Conductor informs Mrs. McGillicuddy that she is in the wrong stateroom and shows her where to go. Mr. Estes, a Jewelry Salesman, takes the room. Lucy pulls the emergency brake again when she finds Estes in the room and not her mother. Because he's carrying a gun, Lucy thinks Estes is a crook. A Detective (Joseph Crehan), who recognizes Ricky, tells him there was a jewelry robbery and they are checking all trains going East. Lucy peeks through Estes' door and sees him with his jewels and is convinced he's the thief. Lucy tells Ethel about the jewels. There's a man (Harry Bartell) sitting nearby that overhears this. He pretends to be a detective and has Lucy lead him to the room. Lucy realizes he's the jewel thief when he knocks out Estes and takes the jewels. Lucy pulls the emergency brake again and Ricky is able to capture the thief. Gil Perkins as Passenger.
133	6	"Homecoming"	James V. Kern	Jess Oppenheimer, Madelyn Pugh, Bob Carroll, Jr., Bob Schiller and Bob Weiskopf	October 20, 1955	November 7, 1955
The Ricardos and the Mertzes are back home and there is a large crowd to welcome them. Mrs. Trumbull (Elizabeth Patterson) says that the neighbors all chipped in and there will be a Ricky Ricardo block party. Everyone wants to be near movie star Ricky. Fred finds a way to make money off of this. Lucy tries to get some attention, but everyone talks to Ricky. Even Fred and Ethel start catering to him. Lucy gets a call from columnist Nancy Graham (Elvia Allman), who wants to do a story about Lucy. Nancy arrives at the apartment. Turns out Nancy is only interested in stories about Lucy after she met Ricky. Something Nancy says makes Lucy believe she has to do everything she can to make Ricky happy. Ricky doesn't like the way Lucy is fawning over him and will do what he can to make her stop. Ricky becomes over demanding. Ricky's plan works and Lucy gets back to acting like herself. Charlotte Lawrence as Marge. Barbara Pepper as Neighbor.
134	7	"Face to Face"	James V. Kern	Jess Oppenheimer, Madelyn Pugh, Bob Carroll, Jr., Bob Schiller and Bob Weiskopf	October 20, 1955	November 14, 1955
Ricky gets a new agent after signing a contract with the Associated Artist talent agency. Agent Johnny Clark (John Gallaudet) comes to the apartment while Fred and Ethel are there. He says Ricky and Lucy are scheduled to appear on Ed Warren's (Elliott Reid) TV interview show, "Face to Face", from their home. Not knowing Fred and Ethel own the building, he calls Ricky's apartment a "dump". Johnny recommends a Park Avenue apartment, but Ricky says he likes it here. The next day Lucy tells Ricky she went to look at a Park Avenue apartment. Meanwhile, Ethel tells Fred that Lucy should move to help Ricky's career. Ethel thinks they should start a fight during their bridge game with Lucy and Ricky. Lucy tells Fred and Ethel that they will move. Ricky sees through their scheme and he is touched, but he's not moving. Ethel is sad that Lucy will be leaving, but calls Aunt Martha about renting the apartment. Lucy gets upset when Aunt Martha calls her about the apartment. Johnny tells the Mertzes that Ed Warren wants to do the show from Ricky's apartment to show success hasn't changed him. Fred and Ethel will be on the show as well. Ricky reluctantly agrees to do the show with the Mertzes. During Warren's show the Ricardos and the Mertzes get into an argument, but quickly make up. Song: Desi performs "El Rancho Grande".
135	8	"Lucy Goes to a Rodeo"	James V. Kern	Jess Oppenheimer, Madelyn Pugh, Bob Carroll, Jr., Bob Schiller and Bob Weiskopf	October 27, 1955	November 28, 1955
Fred asks Ricky to be in a show he's working on for his lodge. Ricky won't be able to do it as he's book for a radio show that Friday night. Fred agrees to let Ethel and Lucy be in the show. Later, Fred brings by Rattlesnake Jones (Dub Taylor). Jones is here to see his brother in the rodeo in town. Jones is going to help Fred put together a western show for the lodge. It takes a little effort to find something for Lucy to do in the show. Later, Lucy tells Ricky that his agent Johnny Clark called. Ricky learns that he signed up to do not a radio show, but a Rodeo show. Ricky now needs to put together some western acts. When there are no acts available, he has to reluctantly turn to Lucy and the Mertzes. The Rodeo is the same night as Fred's lodge show. For a small price, Fred agrees to postpone the lodge show. Songs: William and Vivian sing "Birmingham Jail" and "Red River Valley". Lucy sings "Home on the Range". Desi sings "Texas Pete". Doye O'Dell sings "The Old Chisholm Trail"..
136	9	"Nursery School"	James V. Kern	Jess Oppenheimer, Madelyn Pugh, Bob Carroll, Jr., Bob Schiller and Bob Weiskopf	November 3, 1955	December 5, 1955
Three year old Little Ricky is wearing out Lucy. Ricky thinks the boy should go to nursery school, but Lucy is against the idea. Ricky insists she enroll the boy. The next day Lucy tells Fred that Ethel took Little Ricky to the park. Lucy enrolled the boy in nursery school, she just didn't take him there. Ricky comes home and Ethel lets it slip that Little Ricky didn't go to school. Ricky says he will take the boy tomorrow. Lucy tries to hide Little Ricky with Fred, but that doesn't work. Later, Lucy tells Fred and Ethel that the boy loved school. Lucy thinks Little Ricky caught a disease at school and calls Dr. Eugene Gettleman (Olan Soule). Gettleman says it's just a mild case of tonsillitis and he didn't get it from school. Gettleman recommends removing the tonsils. Little Ricky has the operation. Lucy would like to spend the night with the boy, but the Nurse (Iva Shepard) says that isn't allowed. Lucy dresses as a nurse so she can sneak in Little Ricky's teddy bear and causes some confusion. Ricky goes to the hospital and finds Lucy sleeping in Little Ricky's bed. The Nurse will let her stay. Robert Brubaker as Nurse.
137	10	"Ricky's European Booking"	James V. Kern	Jess Oppenheimer, Madelyn Pugh, Bob Carroll, Jr., Bob Schiller and Bob Weiskopf	November 10, 1955	December 12, 1955
Ricky tells Fred that his band got a three week tour in Europe. Ricky won't be able to afford to take Lucy with. Ricky does tell Lucy and promises to take her to Europe next year. Lucy overhears that Ricky needs a band manager for the tour and she volunteers. He tells her it's too much responsibility. Ricky agrees that Lucy can only go if she can come up with enough money to pay her own way. Ricky asks Fred to be the manager. Ricky figures that for Lucy and Ethel to go, they need to raise $3000. Lucy decides to raffle off a TV set benefiting a phony charity. She calls Mr. Feldman (Harry Antrim) about a TV and he agrees to donate one. He will print the tickets and hold the raffle in his store. Mr. Jamison (Barney Phillips), from the District Attorney's office, comes to see Lucy. Upon learning where the money will be going, Jamison tells Lucy she is committing fraud. He tells Lucy that if she gives the money back and cancels the drawing, he'll forget what happened. Jamison and Lucy get to Feldman's store, but Ethel has already pulled the winning ticket. Feldman tells them that he brought in Dorothea Wolbert, the President of the Ladies Overseas Aid. That was the charity that Lucy thought she made up. Lucy gives Dorothea the money and she's off the hook with Jamison. Ethel tells Fred she mortgaged the building to get the money for the trip. Ricky finds a way to have Lucy and Ethel go along on the trip. Note: Ricky and The Pied Pipers sing "Forever, Darling" in the episode, the theme song of the upcoming Ball-Arnaz picture of the same name.
138	11	"The Passports"	James V. Kern	Jess Oppenheimer, Madelyn Pugh, Bob Carroll, Jr., Bob Schiller and Bob Weiskopf	November 17, 1955	December 19, 1955
Lucy shows Ethel a list of all the places Ricky's band will be playing in Europe. Ricky comes home with the tickets and mentions they just need to get their passports. Lucy needs her birth certificate in order to get her passport, but Jamestown has no record of her being born there. Ricky learns that if Lucy can find someone that could vouch for her, that might be enough. Lucy calls an old neighbor when she was a little girl, Helen Kaiser (Sheila Bromley). Helen agrees to sign an affidavit. Lucy goes to Helen's apartment and they reminisce a little. Lucy meets Helen's husband, Sidney (Robert J. Stevenson). Because Helen lied to Sidney about her age, she realizes she can't sign the affidavit. Lucy devises a way to sneak to Europe with the others. She will hide in Fred's large Vaudeville steamer trunk. While trying it out, she ends up locked in the trunk with the key in her pocket. Ethel goes to get Fred, but she can't find him. Dr. Peterson comes by to sign the affidavit. Because he can't see her as she is in the trunk, Lucy has to find another way to prove who she is. Ricky and Fred get the trunk open. Lucy ends up receiving her birth certificate in the mail from her mother. Lucy learns from Dr. Peterson that she was actually born in West Jamestown. Marco Rizo as Piano Player. Songs: William sings "Mademoiselle from Armentières". Lucy and Sam Hearn sing "Skip to My Lou".
139	12	"Staten Island Ferry"	James V. Kern	Jess Oppenheimer, Madelyn Pugh, Bob Carroll, Jr., Bob Schiller and Bob Weiskopf	November 24, 1955	January 2, 1956
Fred is afraid he will get seasick on the boat. Lucy, Fred and Ethel are each learning a different language to help when they are in Europe. Ricky comes home with everyone's passport picture. No one is happy with they way they look. Lucy and Ethel want to get new pictures. Ricky and Fred go to check their accommodations on the boat and Fred gets seasick. Fred says he can't go on the trip. Ricky suggests seasick pills and take a practice run on the Staten Island Ferry. Fred and Lucy are on the ferry. Fred feels fine, but Lucy starts to get seasick. She takes several of Fred's pills and they both fall asleep. It's afternoon and Ethel is at the passport office wondering where Lucy and Fred are. The Ferryboat Officer (Stanley Farrar) wakes Fred up and tells him what time it is. Fred wakes up Lucy and he tries to get her off the boat. Meanwhile, the Passport Office Clerk (Charles Lane) tells Ethel that he closes in a few minutes. Fred and Lucy show up and Lucy is still drowsy. Ricky arrives. It takes some doing, but Ethel and Lucy get their passports.
140	13	"Bon Voyage"	James V. Kern	Jess Oppenheimer, Madelyn Pugh, Bob Carroll, Jr., Bob Schiller and Bob Weiskopf	December 1, 1955	January 16, 1956
Aboard the ocean liner SS Constitution, Ricky and Lucy show her mother and Mrs. Trumbull their state room. Lucy kisses Little Ricky goodbye and the two women leave the ship. Lucy goes ashore just one more time to give Little Ricky another kiss. A man with a bicycle comes by and Lucy's dress gets caught in the bike chain. Lucy winds up missing the boat. Ricky calls the Dock Agent (Ken Christy) and has him page Lucy. Ricky tells Lucy she can take the Pilot Boat that will take her to the ship. After Lucy misses the Pilot Boat, the Dock Agent suggests she hire a helicopter. Realizing that Lucy isn't on the Pilot Boat, the Ship Officer (Tyler McVey) recommends a helicopter to Ricky. Lucy speaks with the Helicopter Dispatcher (Jack Albertson) and then boards a helicopter. The Helicopter Pilot (Frank Gerstle) tries to calm Lucy down. The pilot explains to Lucy that they don't land on the boat. He has to lower her down with a cable. It takes a bit of doing, but Lucy gets on the boat. Notes: Desi Arnaz claims in several interviews that this was the most expensive episode produced. This episode inspired the later Desilu series Whirlybirds, with Kenneth Tobey.
141	14	"Second Honeymoon"	James V. Kern	Jess Oppenheimer, Madelyn Pugh, Bob Carroll, Jr., Bob Schiller and Bob Weiskopf	December 8, 1955	January 23, 1956
Lucy tells Ethel that this ocean trip feels like a second honeymoon. Lucy has a whole list of things she wants to do with Ricky. Ricky tells Lucy he has previous shipboard engagements with his band. Lucy figures she'll do things with Ethel. Suddenly Fred is feeling romantic and wants the trip to be a second honeymoon with Ethel. Fred and Ethel see the Social Director (Tyler McVey) to sign up for several events. They brought Lucy along, but she feels out of place and goes off on her own. Lucy asks a Passenger (Herbert Lytton) if he plays ping-pong. He says he does, but then his wife (Paula Winslowe) comes by. The Social Director tells Lucy he found her a partner and his name is Kenneth Hamilton. Kenneth turns out to be a little boy. Later, Lucy tries to make Ricky jealous by telling him the fun she had with Kenny, not telling him Kenny is a little boy. Things backfire for Lucy when Kenny comes to the door. After his performance, Lucy tries to get romantic, but Ricky falls asleep. The next evening, Lucy devises a plan with Ethel to trap Ricky in the room and gives Ethel the key. Ricky says he got the night off and they should go out and have some fun. But now they are locked in the room and Lucy gets stuck in the porthole. Songs: Desi performs "Cielito Lindo" and "Ricky's Torch Song".
142	15	"Lucy Meets the Queen"	James V. Kern	Jess Oppenheimer, Madelyn Pugh, Bob Carroll, Jr., Bob Schiller and Bob Weiskopf	December 15, 1955	January 30, 1956
The Ricardos and the Mertzes are in London. Lucy would really like to see Queen Elizabeth II. She asks the Bellboy (Sam Edwards) whether he's ever seen her. Ricky tries to explain to Lucy the convergence from dollars to pounds. Lucy tries to make a Palace Guard smile. Ethel manages to get a glimpse of the Queen, but Lucy misses seeing her. Back at the hotel, there's a crowd trying to get someone's autograph. Lucy and Ethel think it might be the Queen, but it turns out to be Ricky. Ricky tells Lucy that the Royal Family will be at Ricky's show at the London Palladium tomorrow night. Lucy will be presented to the Queen. The Chambermaid (Nancy Kulp) tries to show Lucy and Ethel how to curtsy before the Queen. Later, Ricky found out that Lucy will not be presented to the Queen. He calls his agent who tells him that Lucy can see the Queen if she is one of the performers in the show. Ricky agrees to let Lucy be in the show. During a dance number in the show, Lucy is clearly in pain. With a little help, Lucy does meet the Queen.
143	16	"The Fox Hunt"	James V. Kern	Jess Oppenheimer, Madelyn Pugh, Bob Carroll, Jr., Bob Schiller and Bob Weiskopf	December 22, 1955	February 6, 1956
Lucy and Ricky come back from a party. Lucy is not happy that Ricky danced with another woman five times. Ricky says that Angela Randall (Hillary Brooke) is just a star struck fan. Ricky gets a call from Sir Clive Richardson (Walter Kingsford), who wants to discuss a picture deal. Lucy would like Ricky to get an invitation to Clive's British estate, Brookeshire Manor. Clive is coming to the hotel and Ricky doesn't want Lucy to say anything about an invitation. Because of their accents, Ricky and Clive at first have a hard time understanding each other. With the Mertzes' help, Lucy manages to get an invitation from Sir Clive to come to his estate for the weekend. Clive's daughter comes by and it turns out to be Angela. She is an actress and Randall is her stage name. Once Lucy finds out who Angela is, she changes her mind about the invitation, but Ricky says they're going. Fred and Ethel are invited as well. Not wanting Ricky and Angela to have alone time, Lucy agrees to go on a fox hunt. Trouble is she never rode a horse before. It takes quite a bit of doing to get Lucy on the horse. Lucy winds up in a bush with the fox.
144	17	"Lucy Goes to Scotland"	James V. Kern	Jess Oppenheimer, Madelyn Pugh, Bob Carroll, Jr., Bob Schiller and Bob Weiskopf	January 6, 1956	February 20, 1956
In this Brigadoon-inspired episode, complete with musical numbers, Lucy would like to go to Scotland to look up some of her relatives. Lucy dreams that she visits her ancestral village in Scotland. It is once again the year when they must sacrifice a McGillicuddy to a man-eating, two-headed dragon (Fred and Ethel). For the first time, there is no McGillicuddy in town. The villagers are delighted at Lucy's arrival. Scotty McTavish McDougal McCardo (Ricky) tells the people that he saw the dragon coming. The Mayor tells Scotty to guard Lucy so she doesn't get away. Scotty falls in love with Lucy and tells her she is to be fed to the dragon. Scotty and Lucy go to see the dragon. The dragon says it will eat Lucy tomorrow. Scotty says he will fight the dragon. The next day the dragon arrives in town. Scotty changes his mind about fighting the dragon and starts to push Lucy towards it. Lucy wakes up from her dream. She hits Ricky with a pillow and calls him a coward. Betty Noyes as Towns person. Norma Zimmer as Towns person. Rudy Bowman as Towns person. Goof: McGillicuddy is an Irish surname.
145	18	"Paris at Last"	James V. Kern	Jess Oppenheimer, Madelyn Pugh, Bob Carroll, Jr., Bob Schiller and Bob Weiskopf	January 12, 1956	February 27, 1956
The Ricardos and the Mertzes arrive in Paris. Lucy wants to spend the day by herself, but Ricky is worried because she doesn't know the language that well. A man (Lawrence Dobkin) outside the American Express office offers to exchange money for Lucy. Lucy doesn't know he is a Counterfeiter. Lucy gives some of those francs to Fred. Lucy then meets Pierre Charpontier (Shepard Menken), an artist painting on the street. She buys his painting. Pierre turns out to be crooked as he has several copies of the painting. Lucy goes to an outdoor cafe and the Waiter (Maurice Marsac) shows her a table. A Tour Guide (Fritz Feld) walks by with several people, including Fred and Ethel. Lucy pretends to be French and acts as though she doesn't know them. She pays for her meal and the Chef (Rolfe Sedan) realizes the money is fake. A Policeman (John Mylong) comes by and Lucy is arrested. Ricky arrives at the police station. With the help of the Police Sgt. (Ramsay Hill) and a Drunk (Vicente Padula), they are able to communicate with Ricky. Lucy will pay a fine and it will be forgotten. Fred and Ethel are brought in for passing counterfeit money. Things are worked out. Later, Ricky, Lucy and the Mertzes realize they each bought a copy of the same painting. Bob Carroll Jr. as Cafe Patron Songs: William sings "Mademoiselle from Armentières". Lucy sings "Alouette".
146	19	"Lucy Meets Charles Boyer"	James V. Kern	Jess Oppenheimer, Madelyn Pugh, Bob Carroll, Jr., Bob Schiller and Bob Weiskopf	January 19, 1956	March 5, 1956
The Ricardos and the Mertzes are at an outdoor cafe. Lucy keeps thinking she sees Charles Boyer. Just then Charles actually sits at a table in the cafe. While the wives go to adjust their make-up, Ricky warns Charles about them. Ricky suggests that Charles deny he is Charles to Lucy. Charles agrees to play along. He tells Lucy he is an actor named Maurice Dubois. Later, there's an article in the paper about Ricky having lunch with Charles to discuss a television appearance. Ricky wonders how he can keep Lucy away. Lucy sees the article. Ricky pretends to be jealous as a way for Lucy to not see Charles. Lucy comes up with a plan to have Maurice Dubois pretend to be Charles. He would flirt with Lucy and Lucy will turn him down, showing Ricky he has nothing to be jealous about. Charles tells Ricky Lucy's plan. Later at the apartment, Charles goes through with Lucy's plan. Ethel calls Lucy and says she learned from Fred that Ricky and Charles are playing a trick on her. Now that they know Maurice is really Charles, Lucy and Ethel pester him for an autograph. Things get very awkward for Charles.
147	20	"Lucy Gets a Paris Gown"	James V. Kern	Jess Oppenheimer, Madelyn Pugh, Bob Carroll, Jr., Bob Schiller and Bob Weiskopf	February 16, 1956	March 19, 1956
Ricky receives an invitation to Jacques Marcel's Spring Fashion Show. Fred thinks letting the wives go to that show is a big mistake. They will want to buy one of those expensive outfits. Ricky tells Lucy he couldn't get an invitation. Lucy does find he was lying. After the show, Lucy tells Ethel she really wants a Jacques Marcel dress. Lucy tells Ricky that she will go on a hunger strike until he buys her a dress. Ricky tempts Lucy with some food he had sent to the room, but she refuses to eat. After Ricky and Fred leave, Lucy shows Ethel where she has food hidden. Ricky breaks down and buys Lucy the dress. Then he finds out Lucy was cheating and takes the dress back. Ricky and Fred decide to teach the girls a lesson by creating faux original gowns from potato sacks and putting a Jacques Marcel label on it. The wives are wearing the outfits and think they are the height of fashion. Jacques Marcel sees them at an outdoor cafe. Ricky confesses that the dresses are fakes. Later they see Jacques and two of his models who are wearing the exact same potato sack dresses. John Bleifer as Waiter Georgia Holt as Jacques Marcel Model.
148	21	"Lucy in the Swiss Alps"	James V. Kern	Jess Oppenheimer, Madelyn Pugh, Bob Carroll, Jr., Bob Schiller and Bob Weiskopf	February 23, 1956	March 26, 1956
While in Lucerne, the Ricardos and the Mertzes go mountain climbing in the Swiss Alps, and are stuck in a cabin with little to eat after a sudden avalanche.
149	22	"Lucy Gets Homesick in Italy"	James V. Kern	Jess Oppenheimer, Madelyn Pugh, Bob Carroll, Jr., Bob Schiller and Bob Weiskopf	March 1, 1956	April 9, 1956
Lucy, while in Florence, gets homesick for Little Ricky on his third birthday. To lift her spirits, she hosts an impromptu party for several Italian children who all claim it is their birthday too.
150	23	"Lucy's Italian Movie"	James V. Kern	Jess Oppenheimer, Madelyn Pugh, Bob Carroll, Jr., Bob Schiller and Bob Weiskopf	March 8, 1956	April 16, 1956
En route to Rome, an Italian movie producer offers Lucy a role in a color film called Bitter Grapes. Not realizing that it is a symbolic title, Lucy decides to take a job in a vineyard to do research for the role. She ends up stomping grapes and picks a fight with her fellow stomper. She then misses out being selected for the role due to being stained blue from the grape vat. In 1997, TV Guide ranked this episode #18 on its list of the 100 Greatest Episodes. In the April 9, 2020 episode of Will & Grace, Megan Mullally as Lucy and Leslie Jordan as the Italian woman recreate the grape-stomping scene.
151	24	"Lucy's Bicycle Trip"	James V. Kern	Jess Oppenheimer, Madelyn Pugh, Bob Carroll, Jr., Bob Schiller and Bob Weiskopf	March 22, 1956	April 23, 1956
Lucy organizes a bicycle trip for her, Ricky and the Mertzes from the Italian Riviera to Nice. But when she cannot find her passport, the border guard refuses to let her through the checkpoint.
152	25	"Lucy Goes to Monte Carlo"	James V. Kern	Jess Oppenheimer, Madelyn Pugh, Bob Carroll, Jr., Bob Schiller and Bob Weiskopf	March 29, 1956	May 7, 1956
Ricky has declared the Monte Carlo Casino out-of-bounds for Lucy, but she and Ethel decide to eat dinner there. When Lucy accidentally wins a fortune, she tries to hide it from Ricky, but soon Ricky finds the cash in Ethel's suitcase and believes Fred is an embezzler.
153	26	"Return Home from Europe"	James V. Kern	Jess Oppenheimer, Madelyn Pugh, Bob Carroll, Jr., Bob Schiller and Bob Weiskopf	April 5, 1956	May 14, 1956
In order to make it home from Europe in time for Ricky and his band to perform at the Roxy Theatre, everyone must travel back to New York by plane. Lucy tries to get out of paying duties by disguising a twenty-five pound piece of Italian cheese as a swaddled baby, much to the frustration of Ricky. Frank Nelson and Mary Jane Croft guest-star.

=== Season 6 (1956–57) ===
No. overall	No. in season	Title	Directed by	Written by	Film date	Original release date
154	1	"Lucy and Bob Hope"	James V. Kern	Madelyn Martin, Bob Carroll, Jr., Bob Schiller and Bob Weiskopf	June 5, 1956	October 1, 1956
Sighting Bob Hope at Yankee Stadium, Lucy hopes to persuade him to appear at Ricky's club (now named Club Babalú) unaware that Hope has already agreed to appear. She ends up joining Hope and Ricky in performing at Club Babalú. Richard Keith makes his first appearance as Little Ricky, who is now depicted as four years old.
155	2	"Little Ricky Learns to Play the Drums"	James V. Kern	Madelyn Martin, Bob Carroll, Jr., Bob Schiller and Bob Weiskopf	June 28, 1956	October 8, 1956
Little Ricky's non-stop drum playing threatens the Ricardos' and Mertzes' friendship.
156	3	"Lucy Meets Orson Welles"	James V. Kern	Madelyn Martin, Bob Carroll, Jr., Bob Schiller and Bob Weiskopf	June 14, 1956	October 15, 1956
Lucy wrangles a job as Orson Welles's assistant when he appears at Ricky's club. He is doing a magic act, but Lucy is doing Shakespeare.
157	4	"Little Ricky Gets Stage Fright"	James V. Kern	Madelyn Martin, Bob Carroll, Jr., Bob Schiller and Bob Weiskopf	June 21, 1956	October 22, 1956
Little Ricky gets stage fright before his first school music recital. Howard McNear guest-stars.
158	5	"Visitor from Italy"	James V. Kern	Madelyn Martin, Bob Carroll, Jr., Bob Schiller and Bob Weiskopf	September 24, 1956	October 29, 1956
When a Venetian gondolier (Jay Novello in his third and final appearance) that the Ricardos and the Mertzes met in Europe shows up in New York, a series of mishaps result in Lucy working at a pizza parlor.
159	6	"Off to Florida"	James V. Kern	Madelyn Martin, Bob Carroll, Jr., Bob Schiller and Bob Weiskopf	September 13, 1956	November 12, 1956
Driving to Miami to meet their husbands after Ricky's band is booked in Florida, the girls share the drive with a strange lady (Elsa Lanchester) they suspect is an ax murderess. Strother Martin appears as a store clerk.
160	7	"Deep-Sea Fishing"	James V. Kern	Madelyn Martin, Bob Carroll, Jr., Bob Schiller and Bob Weiskopf	September 27, 1956	November 19, 1956
While in Miami, the boys bet the girls that they will catch bigger fish on a planned deep-sea fishing trip. To win the bet, the men and the women each buy large tunas to pass off as their catch. The only problem is hiding the fish from their spouses.
161	8	"Desert Island"	James V. Kern	Madelyn Martin, Bob Carroll, Jr., Bob Schiller and Bob Weiskopf	October 4, 1956	November 26, 1956
Still in Miami, Lucy and Ethel's scheme to prevent the boys from judging a bathing beauty contest leaves the Ricardos and the Mertzes marooned on a desert island. Claude Akins guest-stars as himself.
162	9	"The Ricardos Visit Cuba"	James V. Kern	Madelyn Martin, Bob Carroll, Jr., Bob Schiller and Bob Weiskopf	October 18, 1956	December 3, 1956
Lucy is bent on impressing Ricky's family when they leave Florida and visit Havana, Cuba, but she cannot seem to say or do anything right.
163	10	"Little Ricky's School Pageant"	James V. Kern	Madelyn Martin, Bob Carroll, Jr., Bob Schiller and Bob Weiskopf	October 25, 1956	December 17, 1956
Back in New York, the Ricardos and the Mertzes sign on as extra cast members in Little Ricky's school play, "The Enchanted Forest".
164	11	"I Love Lucy Christmas Show"	James V. Kern (Flashback Segments directed by William Asher)	Madelyn Pugh Davis, Bob Carroll, Jr., Bob Schiller and Bob Weiskopf (Flashback Segments written by Jess Oppenheimer, Madelyn Pugh Davis and Bob Carroll, Jr.)	November 22, 1956	December 24, 1956
Lucy, Ricky, Fred and Ethel reminisce (via flashbacks of previous episodes) as they trim the tree on Christmas Eve. The flashbacks, all from season 2, include Lucy telling Ricky about her pregnancy in "Lucy Is Enceinte," Lucy, Ricky, Fred and Ethel singing in a barbershop quartet in "Lucy's Showbiz Swan Song," and Ricky, Fred and Ethel frantically preparing for Lucy's impending labor in "Lucy Goes to the Hospital". Because this was a "special" episode, it is not included in the syndication package.
165	12	"Lucy and the Loving Cup"	James V. Kern	Madelyn Martin, Bob Carroll, Jr., Bob Schiller and Bob Weiskopf	November 1, 1956	January 7, 1957
Lucy jokingly dons a loving cup on her head that Ricky is supposed to present to jockey Johnny Longden, but then she cannot get it off.
166	13	"Lucy and Superman"	James V. Kern	Madelyn Martin, Bob Carroll, Jr., Bob Schiller and Bob Weiskopf	November 15, 1956	January 14, 1957
Lucy promises to produce Superman (George Reeves) for Little Ricky's fifth birthday party, but must make alternate plans when he is unable to attend. She hastily tries to impersonate Superman herself, but gets locked out on the ledge of the apartment. Note: George Reeves did originally receive voice-over screen credit for this episode, although it was subsequently cut from the syndicated version. After the closing credits, the disclaimer appeared on the screen that said: Superman Character, Feats and Narrative Copyrighted by National Comics Publications, Inc., 1956
167	14	"Little Ricky Gets a Dog"	James V. Kern	Madelyn Martin, Bob Carroll, Jr., Bob Schiller and Bob Weiskopf	November 8, 1956	January 21, 1957
Little Ricky's new puppy prompts complaints by a grouchy new tenant. June Foray plays the Voice of the Dog.
168	15	"Lucy Wants to Move to the Country"	William Asher	Madelyn Martin, Bob Carroll, Jr., Bob Schiller and Bob Weiskopf	December 6, 1956	January 28, 1957
Fed up with city life, Lucy yearns for the suburban life. Ricky buys an old Colonial house in suburban Westport, Connecticut as a surprise for their anniversary.
169	16	"Lucy Hates to Leave"	William Asher	Madelyn Martin, Bob Carroll, Jr., Bob Schiller and Bob Weiskopf	December 13, 1956	February 4, 1957
The Mertzes rent the Ricardo's apartment to a young newlywed couple named Mr. and Mrs. Taylor. Lucy and Ricky decide to sell their furniture to the Taylors, but when Lucy finds out that the Taylors plan to make alterations the furniture, she buys all of it back from them. Then when the Ricardos find out that the Connecticut house's title search has been delayed for two weeks, they find themselves, and all their belongings, living with the Mertzes while they wait to move into their new home.
170	17	"Lucy Misses the Mertzes"	William Asher	Madelyn Martin, Bob Carroll, Jr., Bob Schiller and Bob Weiskopf	December 20, 1956	February 11, 1957
The Ricardos move into their new home in Connecticut. While Little Ricky is at a sleepover, Lucy and Ricky decide to take the train to New York to surprise the Mertzes. But Fred and Ethel have the same idea, and are on their way to Connecticut.
171	18	"Lucy Gets Chummy With the Neighbors"	William Asher	Madelyn Martin, Bob Carroll, Jr., Bob Schiller and Bob Weiskopf	January 10, 1957	February 18, 1957
Lucy's new neighbor, Betty Ramsey, talks Lucy into buying all new furniture, and it all ends up costing over three thousand dollars. When Ricky finds out, he demands that Lucy return it. However, she is too embarrassed to admit to Betty that they cannot afford the new furniture, which leads Betty to assume that Lucy thinks that she has bad taste. Eventually, the Mertzes arrive and help clear up the misunderstanding, and Betty's husband Ralph gives Ricky a job on a television show that pays thirty-five hundred dollars, which will be enough to pay for furniture. Frank Nelson and Mary Jane Croft make their first appearance as Ralph and Betty Ramsey.
172	19	"Lucy Raises Chickens"	William Asher	Madelyn Martin, Bob Carroll, Jr., Bob Schiller and Bob Weiskopf	January 17, 1957	March 4, 1957
Lucy and Ricky decide to raise chickens and sell their eggs to help make ends meet. They hire the Mertzes to help and let them live in the guest house. Soon the Ricardo's house is overrun with a flock of baby chicks, on the day a photographer from House & Garden magazine is due to visit.
173	20	"Lucy Does the Tango"	William Asher	Madelyn Martin, Bob Carroll, Jr., Bob Schiller and Bob Weiskopf	February 7, 1957	March 11, 1957
Lucy and Ethel try to boost egg production by buying several dozen eggs and pretending they are homegrown. But their plan to hide them in their clothing to sneak them into the hen house goes awry when Ricky asks Lucy to rehearse a tango number. This resulted in one of the longest sustained audience laughter sequences in sitcoms.
174	21	"Ragtime Band"	William Asher	Madelyn Martin, Bob Carroll, Jr., Bob Schiller and Bob Weiskopf	February 14, 1957	March 18, 1957
Lucy promises that Ricky will play at a local benefit, but he refuses. So she and the Mertzes put together their own combo—featuring Ricky Ricardo, Jr.
175	22	"Lucy's Night in Town"	William Asher	Madelyn Martin, Bob Carroll, Jr., Bob Schiller and Bob Weiskopf	February 21, 1957	March 25, 1957
In Manhattan for dinner and a hit Broadway show ("The Most Happy Fella"), Lucy discovers that their tickets were instead for the matinée performance. Joseph Kearns has a minor role. Desilu Productions owned a large portion of the show, and was cross-promoting in this episode.
176	23	"Housewarming"	William Asher	Madelyn Martin, Bob Carroll, Jr., Bob Schiller and Bob Weiskopf	February 28, 1957	April 1, 1957
Ethel is jealous of Lucy's friendship with Betty Ramsey. But when Betty reveals that she is from Ethel's home town of Albuquerque, the two become fast friends, and now it is Lucy who feels left out.
177	24	"Building a B-B-Q"	William Asher	Madelyn Martin, Bob Carroll, Jr., Bob Schiller and Bob Weiskopf	March 14, 1957	April 8, 1957
In order to keep Ricky busy while he is on vacation, Lucy and Ethel get him and Fred to start building a backyard barbecue. Things go wrong when Lucy cannot find her wedding ring and decides to take apart the entire brick barbecue when she thinks that it might have fallen into the cement used to build it.
178	25	"Country Club Dance"	William Asher	Madelyn Martin, Bob Carroll, Jr., Bob Schiller and Bob Weiskopf	March 21, 1957	April 22, 1957
At a club dance, Ricky, Fred, and Ralph Ramsey shower attention on a sultry young blonde (portrayed by Barbara Eden), much to the chagrin of their wives. Frank Nelson makes his second and final appearance as Ralph Ramsey.
179	26	"Lucy Raises Tulips"	William Asher	Madelyn Martin, Bob Carroll, Jr., Bob Schiller and Bob Weiskopf	March 28, 1957	April 29, 1957
Lucy is determined to beat Betty Ramsey in Westport's "best-looking garden" contest, and she accidentally runs over Betty's tulip garden with a lawn mower.
180	27	"The Ricardos Dedicate a Statue"	William Asher	Madelyn Martin, Bob Carroll, Jr., Bob Schiller and Bob Weiskopf	April 4, 1957	May 6, 1957
Ricky has been chosen to dedicate a new Revolutionary War statue in the Westport Town Square. But there is a problem: Lucy has accidentally destroyed the statue. Desi Arnaz Jr. appears as an extra in the episode's final scene.

== The Lucy–Desi Comedy Hour episodes ==
After six seasons, the series was renamed The Lucille Ball-Desi Arnaz Show for its original broadcast run and rather than airing as weekly half hour series, hour-long episodes were produced to run occasionally during the year. There were thirteen hour-long shows. The first five were broadcast as specials during the 1957–58 television season. The other eight episodes were broadcast as part of the Westinghouse Desilu Playhouse from October 6, 1958, to April 1, 1960. The series was subsequently broadcast in syndication as The Lucy-Desi Comedy Hour and We Love Lucy. This show had the same cast as I Love Lucy, employed several of the same recurring actors, and every episode featured at least one celebrity guest star. Of the original I Love Lucy cast, besides the principals, Lucy's mother Mrs. McGillicuddy appeared in one Comedy Hour episode; "The Ricardos Go To Japan" in season 3 as Little Ricky's babysitter.

=== Season 1 (1957–58) ===
No. overall	No. in season	Title	Directed by	Written by	Film date	Original release date
1	1	"Lucy Takes a Cruise to Havana"	Jerry Thorpe	Madelyn Martin, Bob Carroll, Jr., Bob Schiller and Bob Weiskopf	June 28, 1957	November 6, 1957
Hollywood columnist Hedda Hopper wants to know how Lucy and Ricky met. In a flashback to 1940, Lucy McGillicuddy and her best friend Susie MacNamara (Ann Sothern whose character makes a crossover appearance from her CBS show Private Secretary) are cruising Havana, where they encounter two tour guides, Ricky Ricardo and his friend, Carlos Garcia (Cesar Romero). Second honeymooners Fred and Ethel Mertz and crooner Rudy Vallee are along for the ride. Note: This was originally shown as a 75-minute episode. All repeats were edited to an hour's length, with the original opening and closing sequences (featuring Hedda Hopper) deleted, replaced by Desi's brief narration at the beginning and end. This is the only episode aside from the Make Room for Daddy crossover where the celebrity guest stars (with the exception of Hopper and Vallee) do not portray themselves.
2	2	"The Celebrity Next Door"	Jerry Thorpe	Madelyn Martin, Bob Carroll, Jr., Bob Schiller and Bob Weiskopf	September 27, 1957	December 3, 1957
Tallulah Bankhead moves in next door to the Ricardos. Once Lucy discovers that a celebrity is in her midst, she tries to win her friendship by inviting her to an elegant dinner party—with Fred and Ethel posing as hired help. Before long Lucy has gotten Ms. Bankhead and Ricky and the Mertzes involved with a local PTA show. Note: Bette Davis was originally booked as the next-door celebrity, but suffered a horseback riding accident. Bankhead was the producers' second choice.
3	3	"Lucy Hunts Uranium"	Jerry Thorpe	Madelyn Martin, Bob Carroll, Jr., Bob Schiller and Bob Weiskopf	November 15, 1957 (Studio portions)	January 3, 1958
Ricky and his band have been booked to play at the Sands Casino in Las Vegas, and Lucy hopes the trip will allow her an opportunity to go uranium hunting. Fred and Ethel are keen on the idea but Ricky forbids it, until mysterious headlines put the entire town in a uproar. Soon the Ricardos, the Mertzes, and Fred MacMurray set out together to strike it rich. It soon becomes a race to see who can get to the claims office first. (Also appearing in this show is MacMurray's wife, June Haver.) Note: This is the first episode that Lucy sports a new short haircut that she will keep for the remainder of the series.
4	4	"Lucy Wins a Racehorse"	Jerry Thorpe	Madelyn Martin, Bob Carroll, Jr., Bob Schiller and Bob Weiskopf	December 1957	February 3, 1958
Lucy wins a race horse for Little Ricky. In order to keep the horse, Lucy enters the horse in a race at Roosevelt Raceway with the help of Betty Grable. Harry James, Betty's husband, also appears.
5	5	"Lucy Goes to Sun Valley"	Jerry Thorpe	Madelyn Martin, Bob Carroll, Jr., Bob Schiller and Bob Weiskopf	February 1958	April 14, 1958
Lucy and Ethel go to Sun Valley without Ricky and Fred. While in Sun Valley, the girls meet Fernando Lamas and Lucy hatches a scheme to make Ricky jealous enough to join them. Note: Several days of location filming for this episode had to be reshot after the initial footage was misplaced after shipment from Sun Valley to Los Angeles. The lost film was found several months later in a Desilu studio vehicle.

=== Season 2 (1958–59) ===
No. overall	No. in season	Title	Directed by	Written by	Film date	Original release date
6	1	"Lucy Goes to Mexico"	Jerry Thorpe	Bob Schiller, Bob Weiskopf and Everett Freeman	June 16, 1958 (Completed)	October 6, 1958
Lucy and the Mertzes go with Ricky to Mexico, where he is scheduled to appear in a show with Maurice Chevalier. Meanwhile, Lucy ends up finding herself in a bullfight.
7	2	"Lucy Makes Room for Danny"	Jerry Thorpe	Bob Schiller and Bob Weiskopf	September 19, 1958	December 1, 1958
The Williams family from The Danny Thomas Show (Danny Thomas, Marjorie Lord, Rusty Hamer and Angela Cartwright) rent Lucy and Ricky's house because the Ricardos are going to Hollywood. When the Hollywood trip is cancelled, the Ricardos end up staying with the Mertzes in the guest house. Gale Gordon also guest-stars, as a civil court judge. Note: Ball and Arnaz subsequently appeared as the Ricardos on an episode of The Danny Thomas Show ("Lucy Upsets the Williams Household") which aired on January 5, 1959.
8	3	"Lucy Goes to Alaska"	Jerry Thorpe	Bob Schiller and Bob Weiskopf	December 19, 1958 (Completed)	February 9, 1959
The Ricardos and Mertzes go to Alaska, where Lucy does a show with Red Skelton. Lucy repeatedly falls out of a hammock in their overcrowded hotel bedroom, and panics while flying a small bush airplane with Skelton.
9	4	"Lucy Wants a Career"	Jerry Thorpe	Bob Schiller and Bob Weiskopf	March 6, 1959 (Copyrighted)	April 13, 1959
Lucy does not want to be a housewife any longer and appears on Paul Douglas' "Early Bird Show" as his "Girl Friday." Note: This episode mirrored life for the Arnazes in the 1940s, as Lucy would meet Desi at the train station as she was leaving for work at a movie studio, while Desi would be headed home after working at a nightclub.
10	5	"Lucy's Summer Vacation"	Jerry Thorpe	Bob Schiller and Bob Weiskopf	May 5, 1959 (Copyrighted)	June 8, 1959
Lucy and Ricky go on a vacation and end up sharing their cabin with Howard Duff and Ida Lupino.

=== Season 3 (1959–60) ===
No. overall	No. in season	Title	Directed by	Written by	Film date	Original release date
11	1	"Milton Berle Hides Out at the Ricardos"	Desi Arnaz	Bob Schiller and Bob Weiskopf	June 1959	September 25, 1959
Lucy tries to let Milton Berle work on his book in peace while he is at the Ricardos' house.
12	2	"The Ricardos Go to Japan"	Desi Arnaz	Bob Schiller and Bob Weiskopf	September 1959	November 27, 1959
Lucy, Ricky, and the Mertzes visit Tokyo, Japan, and meet Bob Cummings. Meanwhile, Lucy wants to buy some real pearls. When a mix-up occurs over the real pearls and some fake ones, Lucy and Ethel find themselves disguised as geisha girls.
13	3	"Lucy Meets the Mustache"	Desi Arnaz	Bob Schiller and Bob Weiskopf	2 March 1960 (Completed)	April 1, 1960
Ricky is depressed because he has not been getting any TV offers lately, so Lucy, Fred, and Ethel try to cheer him up. Ernie Kovacs and his wife Edie Adams guest-star. Note: This is the final episode of the show. Ball filed for divorce the day after the final episode was filmed, on March 3. Ball and Arnaz divorced two months later.
