= Bayer Corporation =

Chemical company and American subsidiary of Bayer AG

- Type: Subsidiary
- Industry: Pharmaceuticals, Agricultural Chemicals,
- Founded: 1954; 72 years ago
- Founder: Werner Baumann
- Headquarters: U.S.
- Area served: Nationwide
- Key people: Philip Blake (Senior Bayer Representative USA)
- Products: prescription medications over the counter drugs nutritional supplements diagnostic products animal health products crop protection products
- Revenue: ▲$17.0 billion USD (€15.1 billion) (2019)
- Number of employees: 20,735 (2019)
- Parent: Bayer
- Subsidiaries: Bayer Animation
- Website: bayerus.com

Bayer Corporation (also known as Bayer USA) is the American subsidiary of Bayer AG. Its main offices and headquarter are located in Whippany, New Jersey. In addition it has 40 fully consolidated subsidiary companies located in 19 different states.

== History ==
Bayer AG began marketing in the United States soon after the company's inception in Germany. In the late 19th century, they began to sell their trademark medication, aspirin. While the name "aspirin" became synonymous with Bayer for over a quarter of a century, the company's patents and trademarks were seized by the United States Office of Alien Property Custodian in 1917, due to Germany's enemy status in World War I. These assets were later auctioned and sold to Sterling Drug.

=== Mobay ===
In 1954, Bayer AG and Monsanto reached an agreement for establishment of a joint venture that was to be called Mobay. Initially established in St. Louis, Mobay established its headquarters in Pittsburgh, Pennsylvania in 1958, moving to a location in Robinson Township in 1960. A polyurethanes manufacturing site in New Martinsville, West Virginia began operation in 1955.

In 1964 the United States Department of Justice brought antitrust action against Mobay, resulting in Bayer AG reaching an agreement to purchase Monsanto's share of the company in 1967. In October 1971 Mobay, along with five other Bayer-owned chemical-related subsidiaries in the United States, merged into a single company called Baychem Chemical Company and headquartered in New York City. By 1974 the company relocated to Pittsburgh under the name Mobay Chemical Company. In that same decade two additional United States companies were acquired and merged into Mobay: Cutter Laboratories in 1974 and Miles Laboratories in 1978.

In 1992 Bayer consolidated its United States operations under the name Miles, and the Mobay name was discontinued.

In 1994, Bayer reacquired full rights to all former Bayer products after they purchased the Winthrop division of over-the-counter drugs from GlaxoSmithKline, and the Miles name was discontinued.

In 2012, Bayer relocated the top United States administrative head to the Bayer HealthCare site in Whippany. In 2019, Bayer announced the end of it operations at its Pittsburgh site. Later that year Bayer agreed to sell its Pittsburgh facilities to Covestro.

=== Bayer MaterialScience divestiture ===
On September 18, 2014, the Board of Directors of Bayer AG announced plans to float the Bayer MaterialScience business on the stock market as a separate entity. This transaction was completed in the fall of 2015 with the establishment of Covestro AG.

== Products ==
Noted over-the-counter Bayer products include Aleve, Bayer Aspirin, Alka-Seltzer, Phillip's Laxatives, Bactine, One-A-Day Vitamins, Flintstone Vitamins, and Midol. The company also markets prescription medications, animal medications, and diagnostic and medical testing equipment. Aside from the medical arm of the company, Bayer also creates many different chemicals and agricultural products.

== Lawsuit and settlement ==
In 2018, Bayer purchased the American agricultural product producer Monsanto Co. With the purchase, Bayer also took on litigation against its weedkiller product, Roundup, which was subject to thousands of lawsuits, representing nearly 100,000 people, claiming the product caused their cancer. While Bayer denied wrongdoing, it did reach a 2020 settlement of $10 billion to eliminate uncertainty and resolve outstanding claims.

== Subsidiaries ==
- Bayer CropScience LLC
- Bayer Health Care LLC
- Bayer Business and Technology Services LLC

== Philanthropic activities ==
In 1953, Bayer Corporation founded the first of three foundations that were later merged into the Bayer USA Foundation to support philanthropic giving in the United States. Foundation grants focus on education and workforce development, and environment and sustainability.

Making Science Make Sense (MSMS) is a science, technology, engineering, and mathematics (STEM) social responsibility program to provide hands-on, inquiry-based educational opportunities in the United States. The program focuses on promoting science and scientific principles to students in grades K-20. Astronaut Mae Jemison is the national spokesperson for MSMS.

== See also ==
- Contaminated haemophilia blood products
