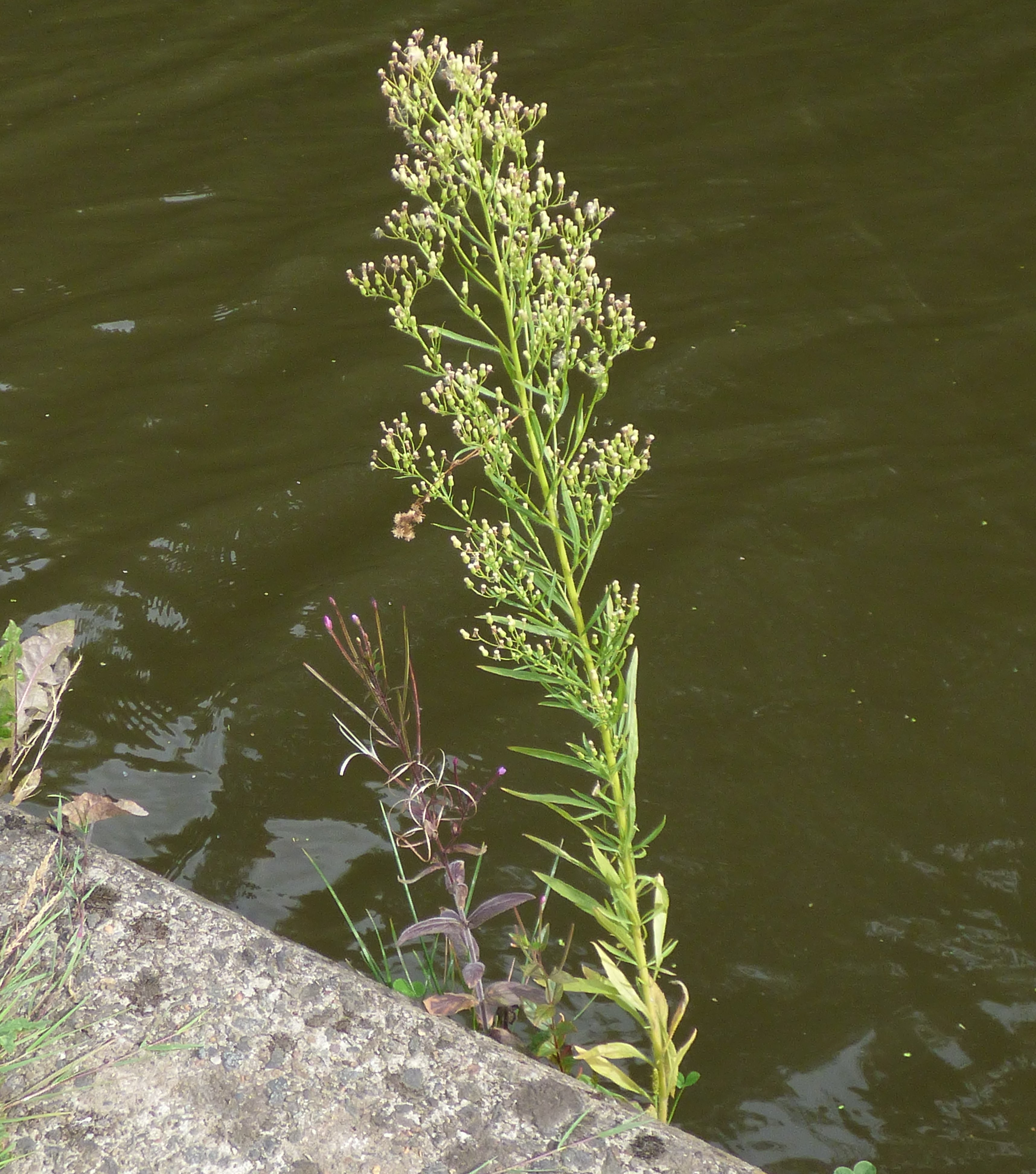

Conservation status
- Secure (NatureServe)

Scientific classification
- Kingdom: Plantae
- Clade: Tracheophytes
- Clade: Angiosperms
- Clade: Eudicots
- Clade: Asterids
- Order: Asterales
- Family: Asteraceae
- Genus: Erigeron
- Species: E. canadensis

Binomial name
- Erigeron canadensis L.

Synonyms
- Alphabetical list: Aster canadensis (L.) E.H.L.Krause; Caenotus canadensis (L.) Raf.; Caenotus pusillus Raf.; Conyza canadensis (L.) Cronquist; Conyza parva Cronquist; Conyzella canadensis (L.) Rupr.; Erigeron myriocephalus Rech.f. & Edelb.; Erigeron paniculatus Lam.; Erigeron pusillus Nutt.; Erigeron ruderalis Salisb.; Erigeron strictus DC.; Inula canadensis Bernh.; Leptilon canadense (L.) Britton; Leptilon pusillum (Nutt.) Britton; Marsea canadensis (L.) V.M.Badillo; Senecio ciliatus Walter; Tessenia canadensis (L.) Bubani; Trimorpha canadensis (L.) Lindm.

= Erigeron canadensis =

Species of flowering plant in the daisy family

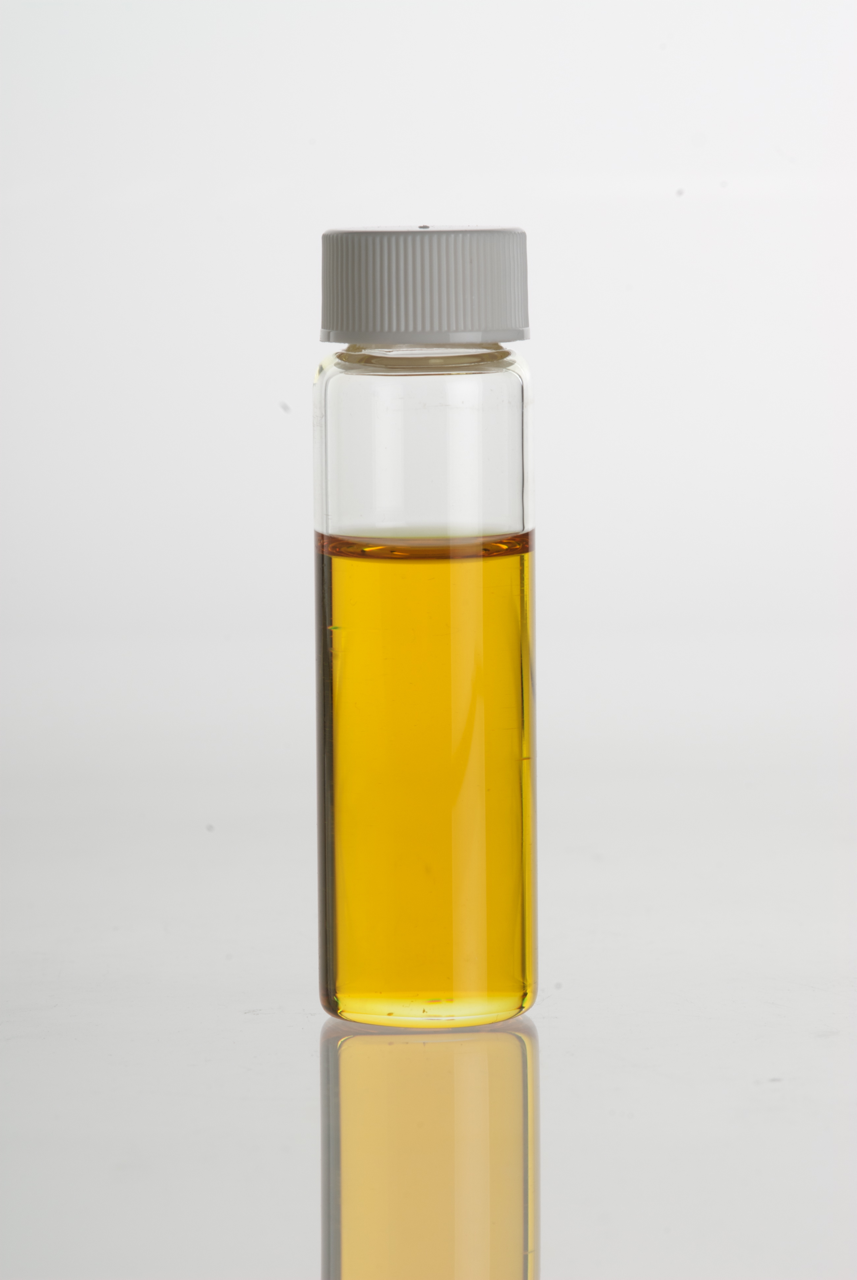
Canadian fleabane (Erigeron canadensis) essential oil in a clear glass vial

Erigeron canadensis (synonym Conyza canadensis) is an annual plant native throughout most of North America and Central America. It is also widely naturalized in Eurasia and Australia. Common names include horseweed, Canadian horseweed, Canadian fleabane, coltstail, marestail, and butterweed. It was the first weed to have developed glyphosate resistance, reported in 2001 from Delaware.

== Description ==
Erigeron canadensis is an annual, herbaceous plant growing to 1.5 metres (5 feet) tall, with sparsely hairy stems. The leaves are unstalked, slender, 2–10 centimetres (0.8–3.9 inches) long, and up to 1 cm (0.4 in) wide, with a coarsely toothed margin. They grow in an alternate spiral up the stem, and the lower ones wither early. The flower heads are produced in dense inflorescences and are 1 cm (0.4 in) in diameter. Each individual flower has a ring of white or pale purple ray florets and a centre of yellow disc florets. The fruit is a cypsela tipped with dirty white down.

Erigeron canadensis can easily be confused with Erigeron sumatrensis, which may grow to a height of 2 m (6.6 ft), and the more hairy Erigeron bonariensis, which does not exceed 1 m (3.3 ft). E. canadensis is distinguished by bracts that have a brownish inner surface with no red dot at the tip, and are free (or nearly free) of the hairs found on the bracts of the other species.

== Distribution and habitat ==
Horseweed originated in North America and Central America and is widespread in its native range. It has spread to inhabited areas of most of the temperate zone of Asia, Europe, and Australia. It is found in Britain from northern Scotland to Cornwall, growing as a weed of arable land and man-made environments. It is considered invasive in China.

Horseweed can grow in a range of natural habitats, from sand dunes to old fields, as well as in gardens and other disturbed areas. It is an indicator for disturbance because it often colonizes disturbed areas in which it was sparse or absent prior to the disturbance. Horseweed is a common pest of agricultural fields, and can tolerate a range of acidic to neutral soils (pH 4.8 to 7.2).

== Weed status ==
Horseweed is commonly considered a weed, and in Ohio, Oregon, and some other locations, it has been declared a noxious weed. It was the first weed to have developed glyphosate resistance, reported in 2001 from Delaware.

It can be found in fields, meadows, and gardens throughout its native range. Horseweed infestations (specifically of 105 plants per 10 ft^{2}) have reduced soybean yields by as much as 83%, with one estimate claiming it can reduce yields by up to 90%. Severe infestations have reduced sugar beet yields by 64%.

It is an especially problematic weed in no-till agriculture, as it is often resistant to glyphosate and other herbicides. Farmers are advised to include 2,4-D or dicamba in a burndown application prior to planting to control horseweed.

== Ecology ==
Horseweed produces a large amount of seeds that are dispersed by wind, allowing it to easily colonize disturbed soils.

The seeds can germinate at any time of year with sufficient moisture and proper temperatures. With fall germination, it overwinters as a rosette and bolts in the spring to flower in the summer. With spring germination, it spends less time as a rosette before bolting to flower. The seeds can persist in the seedbank of disturbed and non-disturbed sites, though it is more prevalent in disturbed sites.

The seeds are capable of persisting in the seedbank after a fire, and the plant increases in frequency in response to more frequent fire regimes.

Erigeron canadensis is insect pollinated and is recorded to have been visited in northern Florida by Ceratina.

== Uses ==
The Zuni people insert the crushed flowers of E. canadensis var. canadensis into the nostrils to cause sneezing, relieving rhinitis. The Seminole people used it for cold and cough medicine, the Iroquois people used it to help combat fevers, and the Navajo and Chippewa peoples used it for stomach pain. Other medicinal applications include use as a nervine, stimulant, and antiplasmodic (anti-parasitic specific to a genus of plasmids - malaria is one) .

== Gallery ==
=== Standard form ===
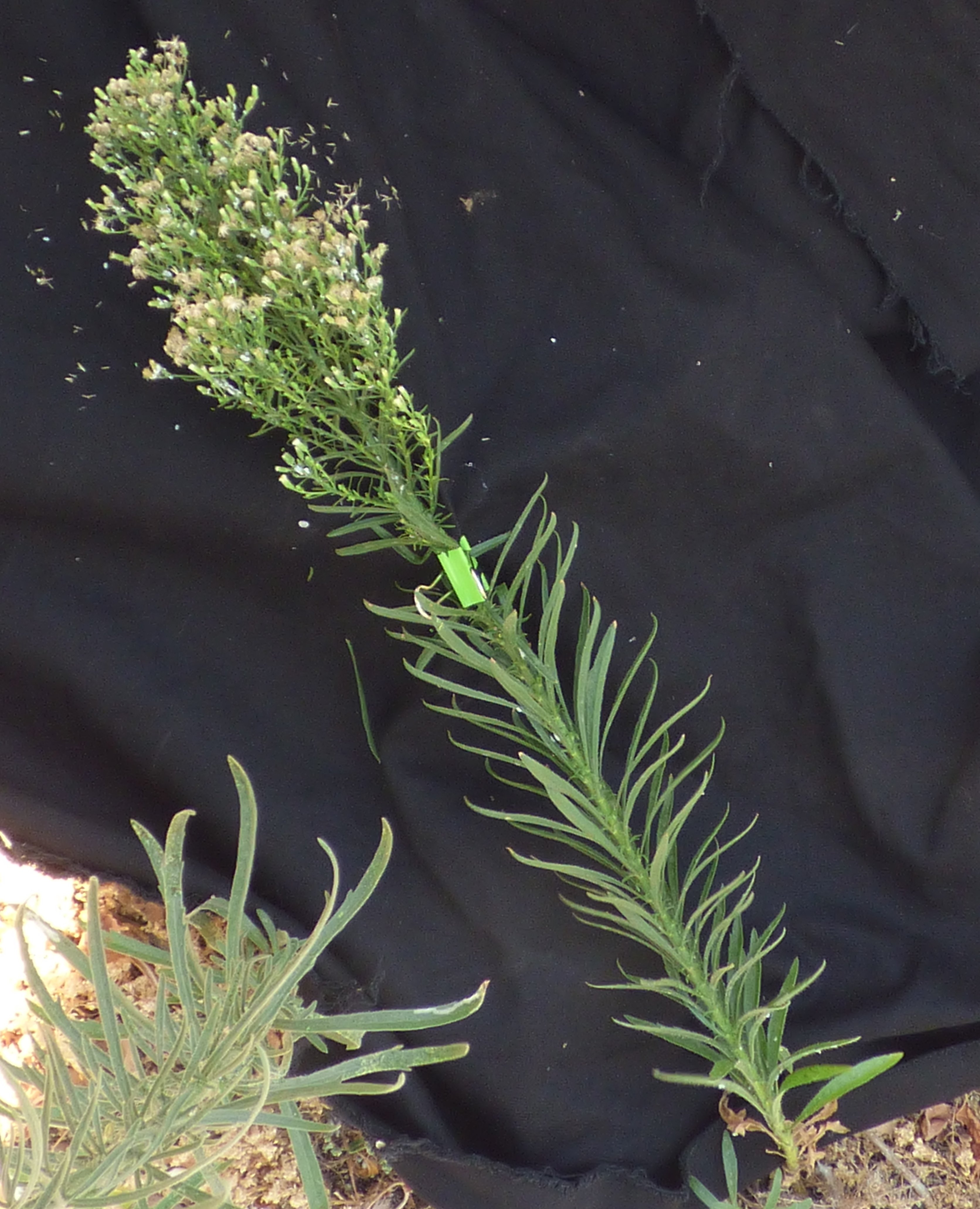
General form, may be light green, inflorescence fairly tight

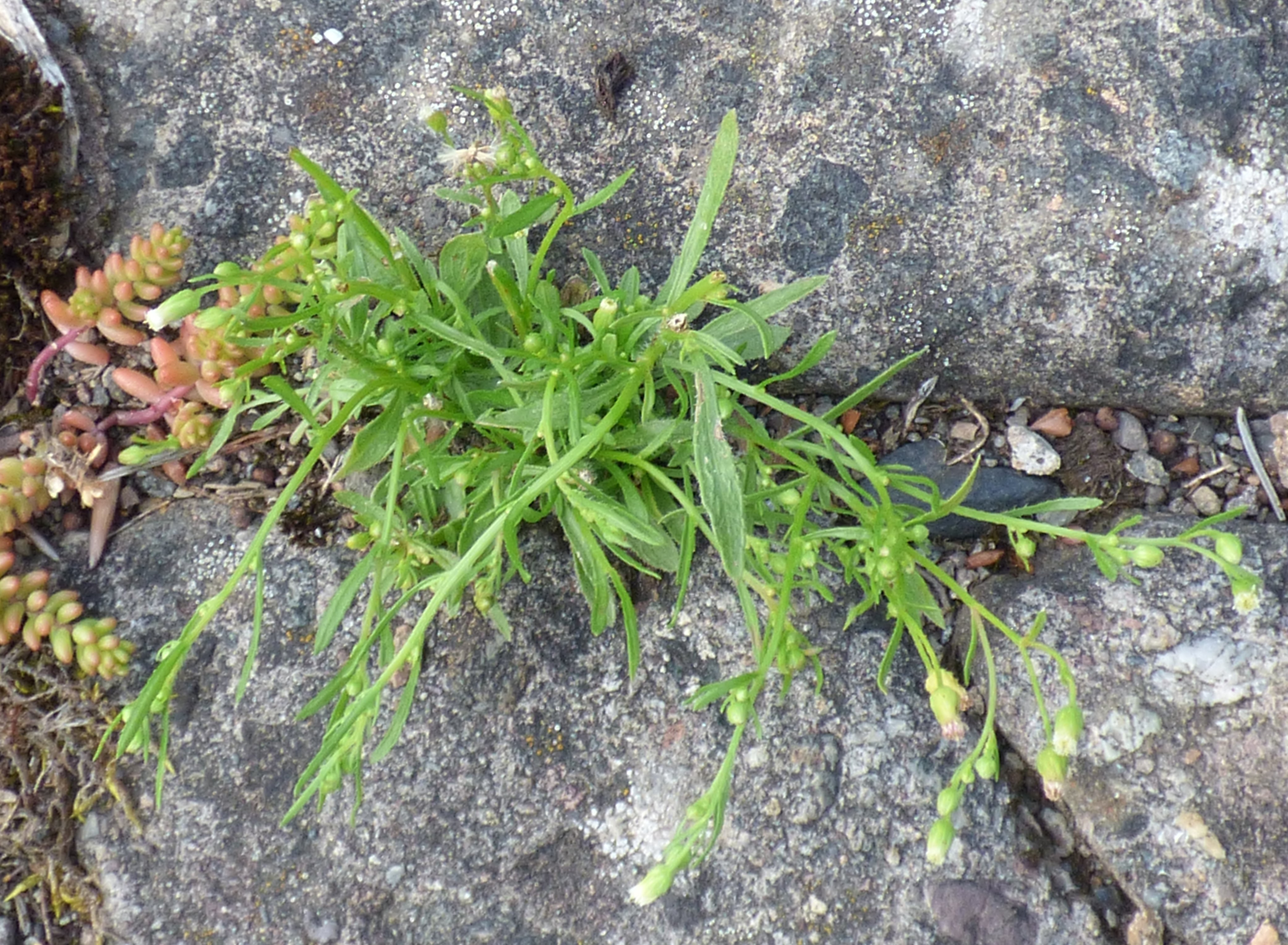
Stemmy form

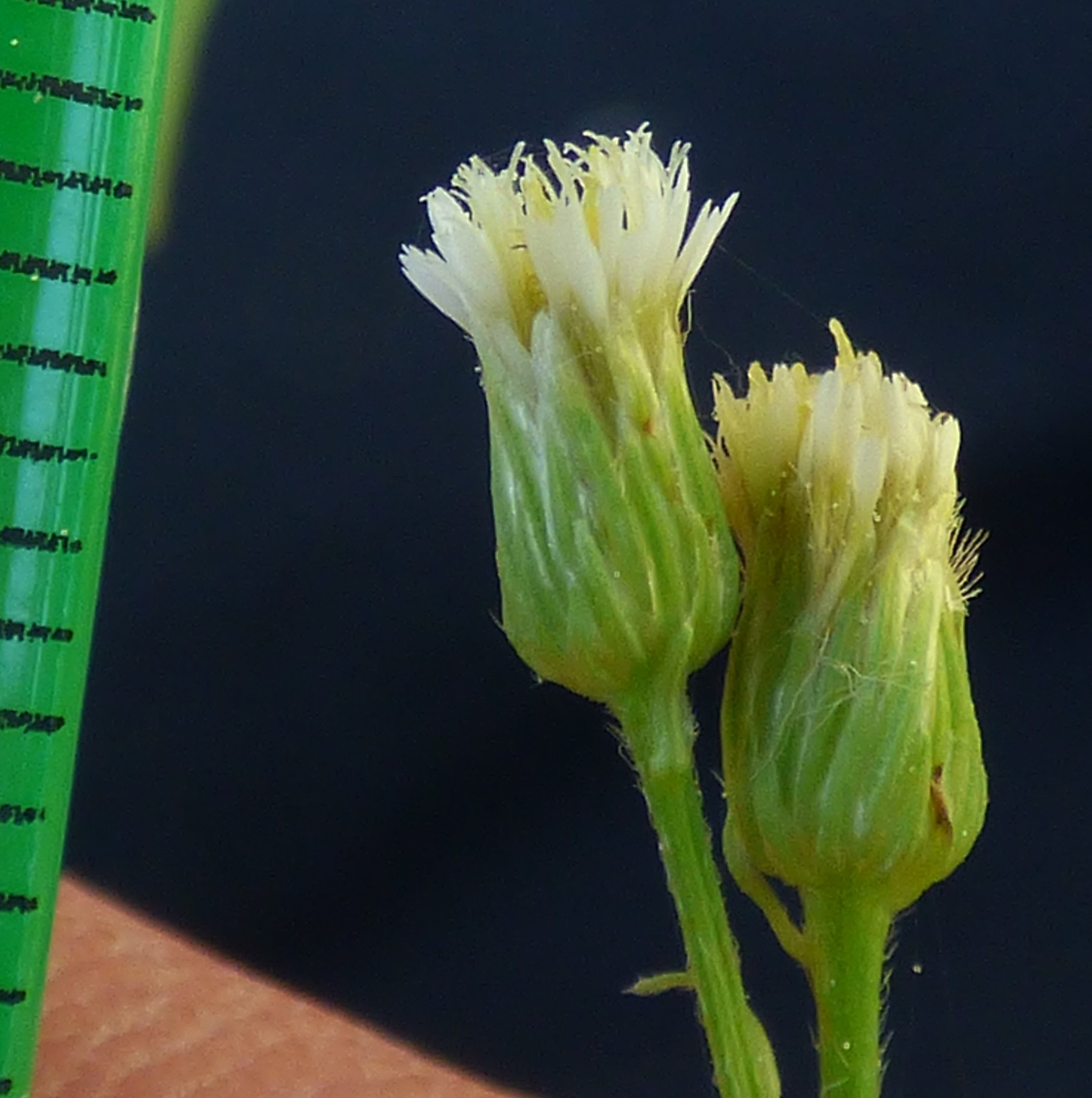
Flower head, hairless or mostly so, ray petals small but conspicuous, base of head not widely bulging

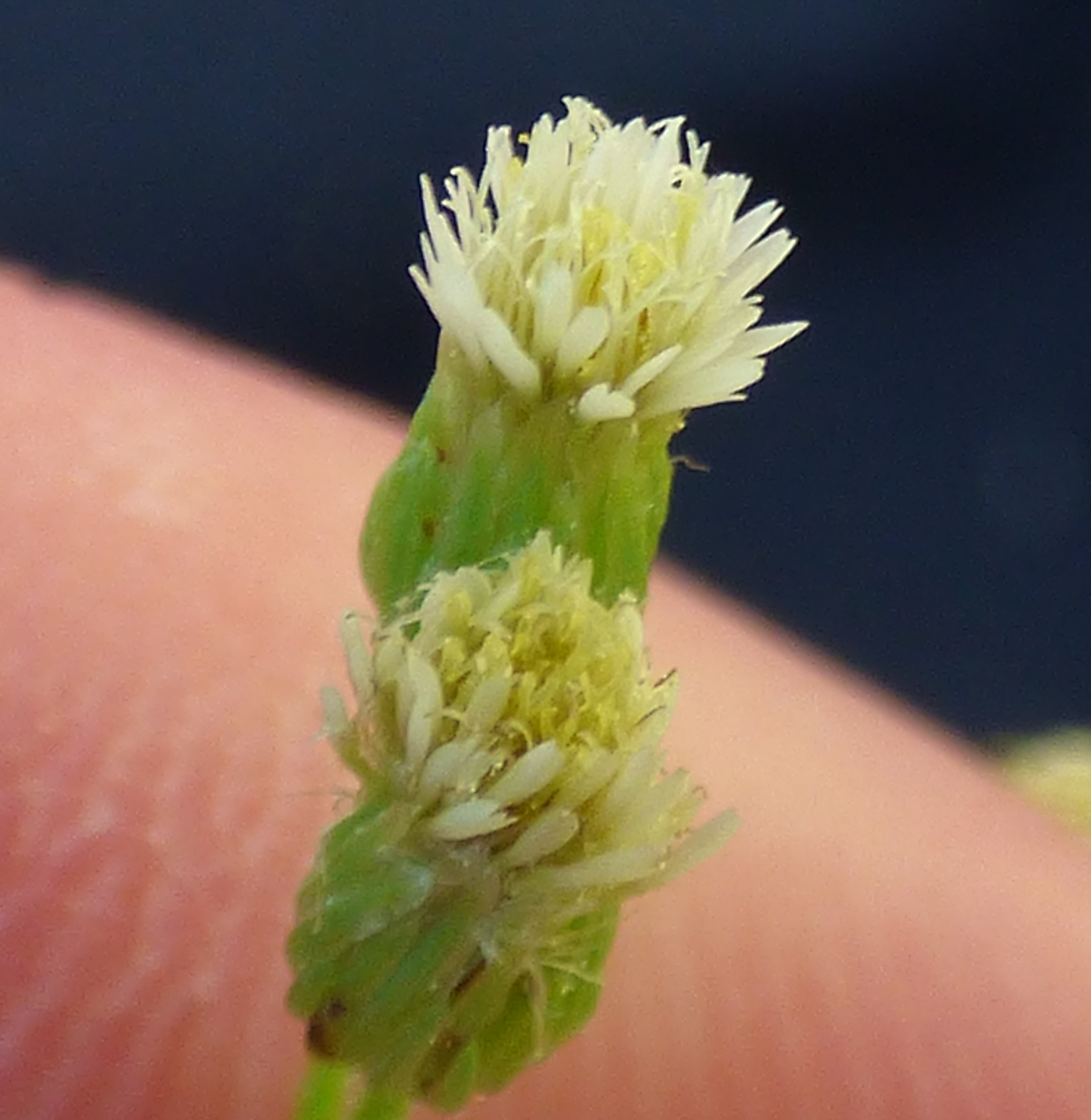
Flower head, angled

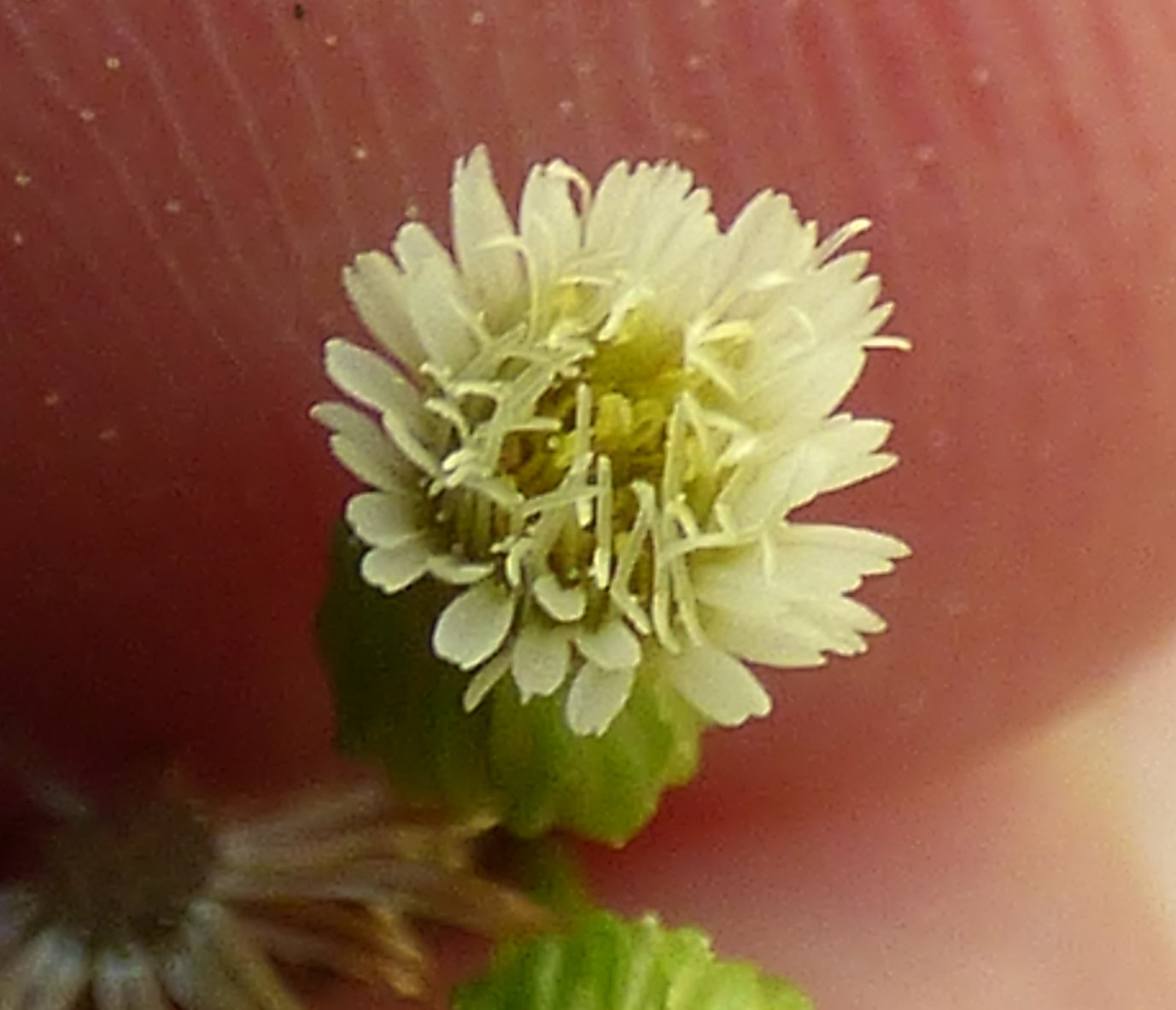
Flower head face on

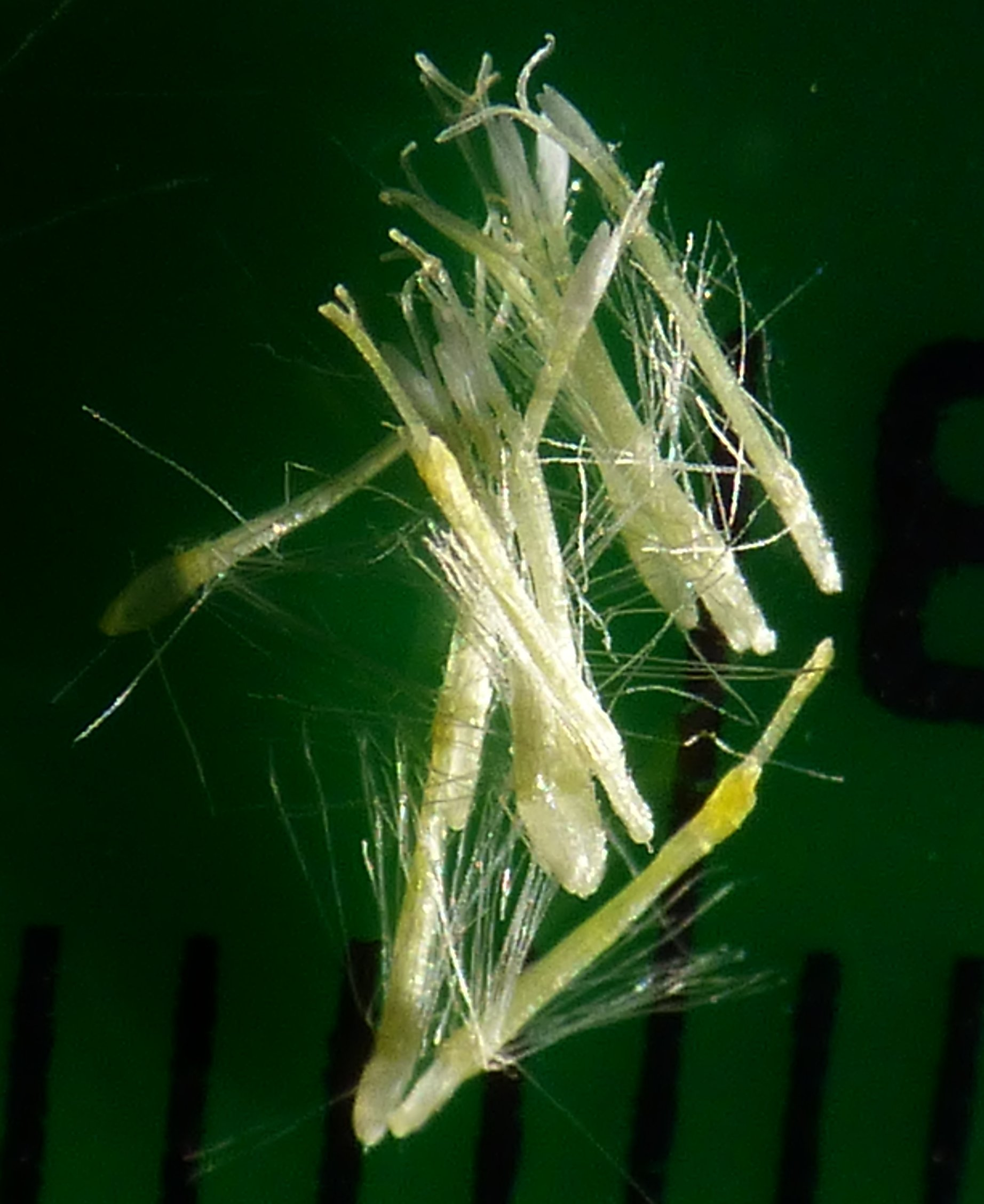
Individual flowers in the head

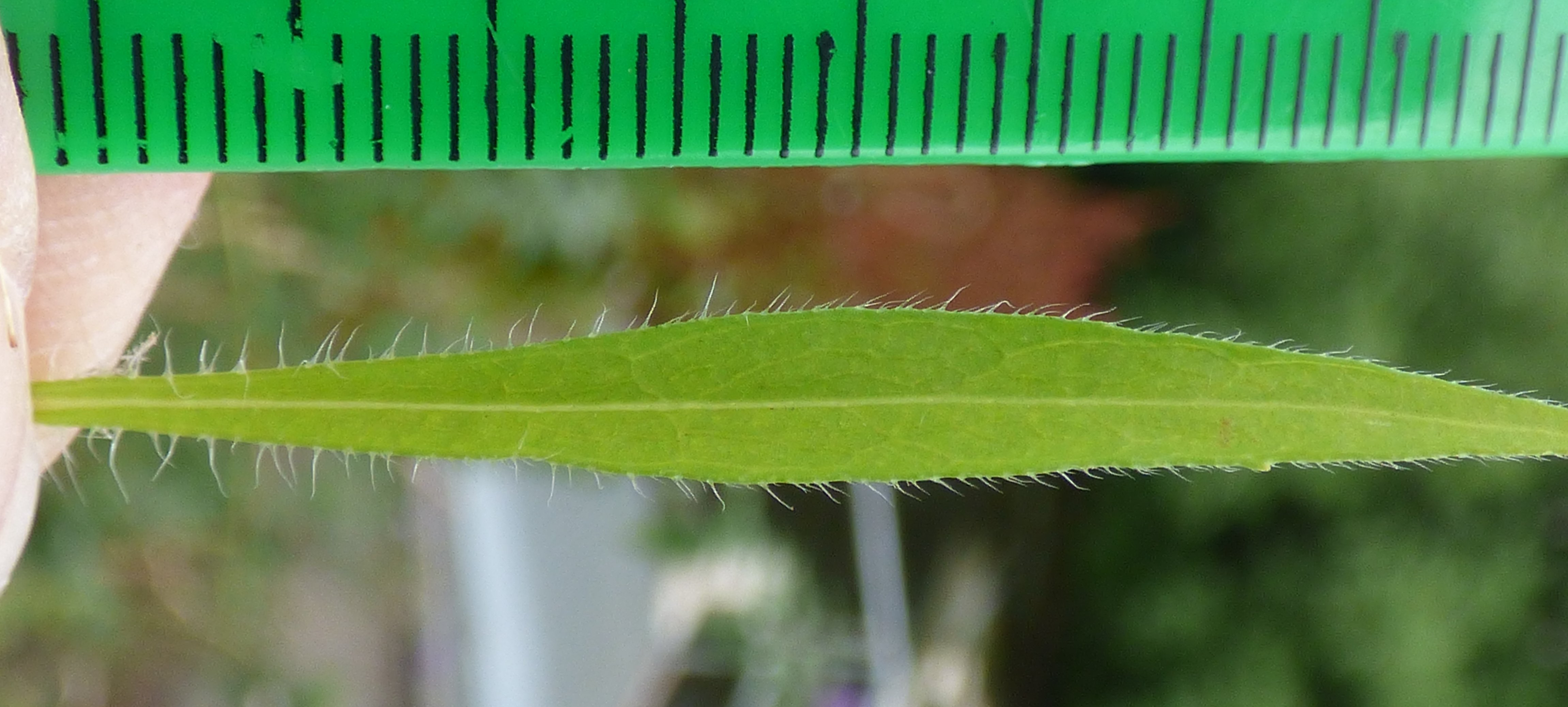
Hair profile of leaf, projecting at base usually, directed forward at tip

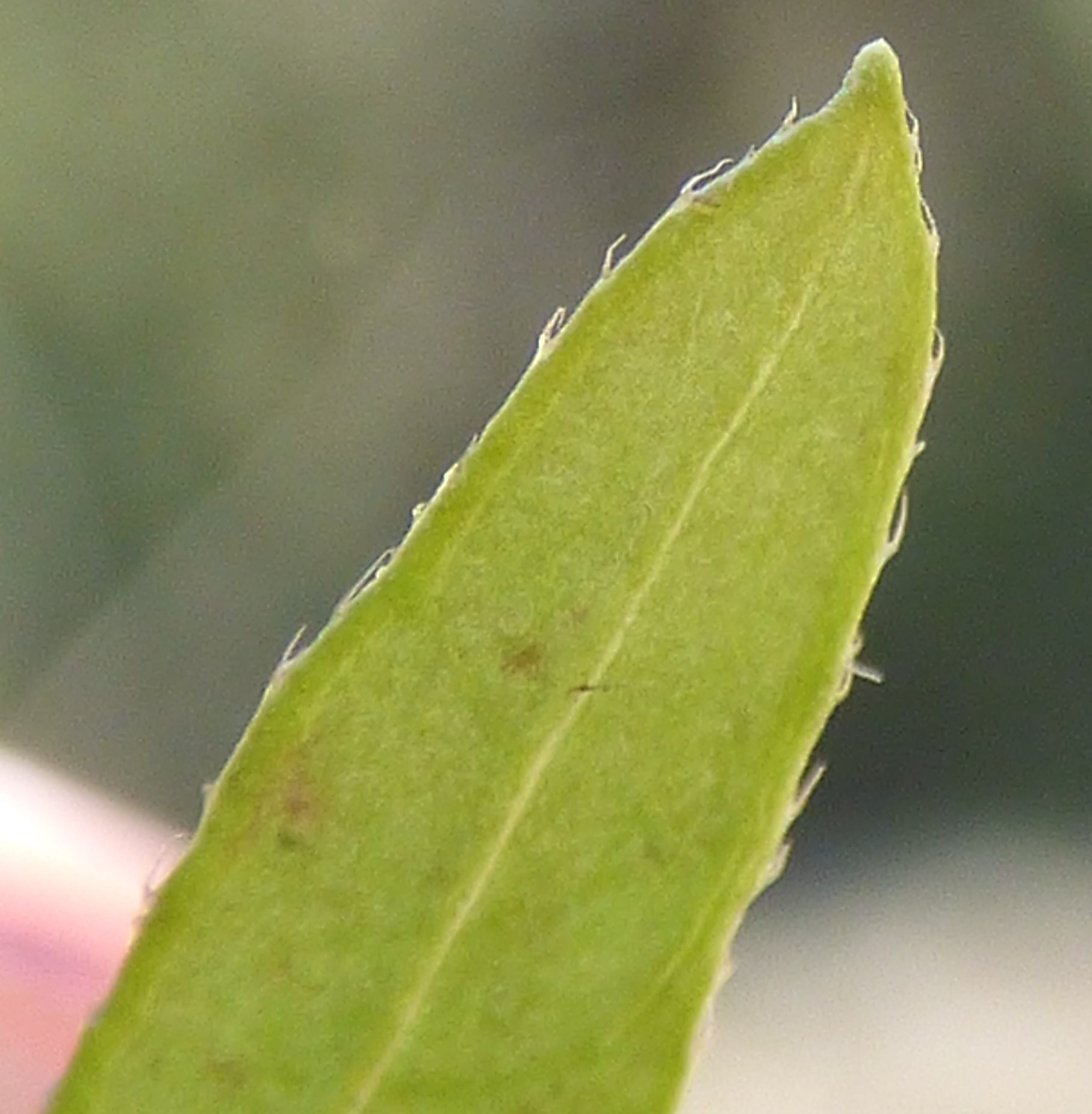
Leaf tip with forward hairs not curving inward

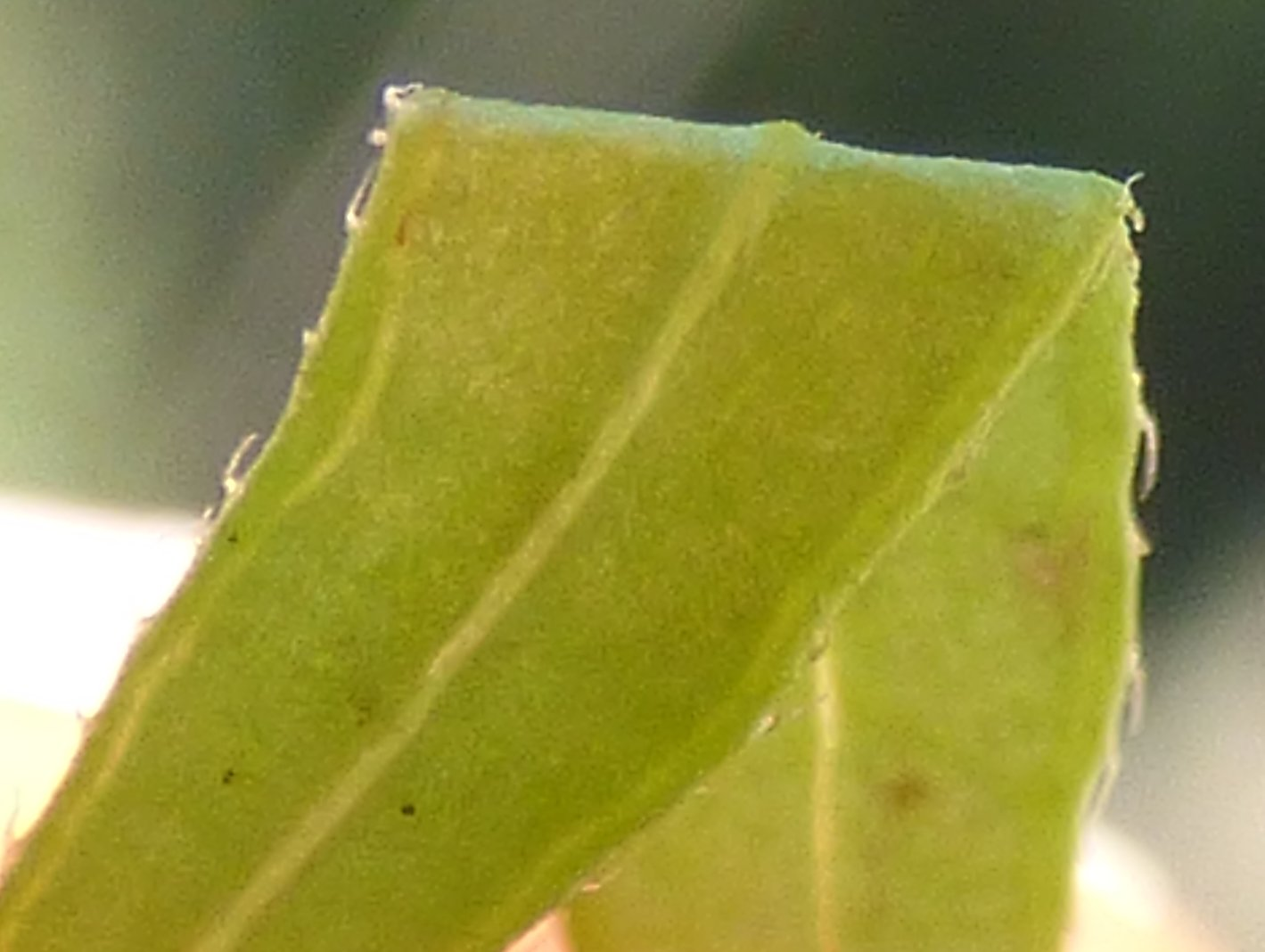
Leaf surfaces not hairy

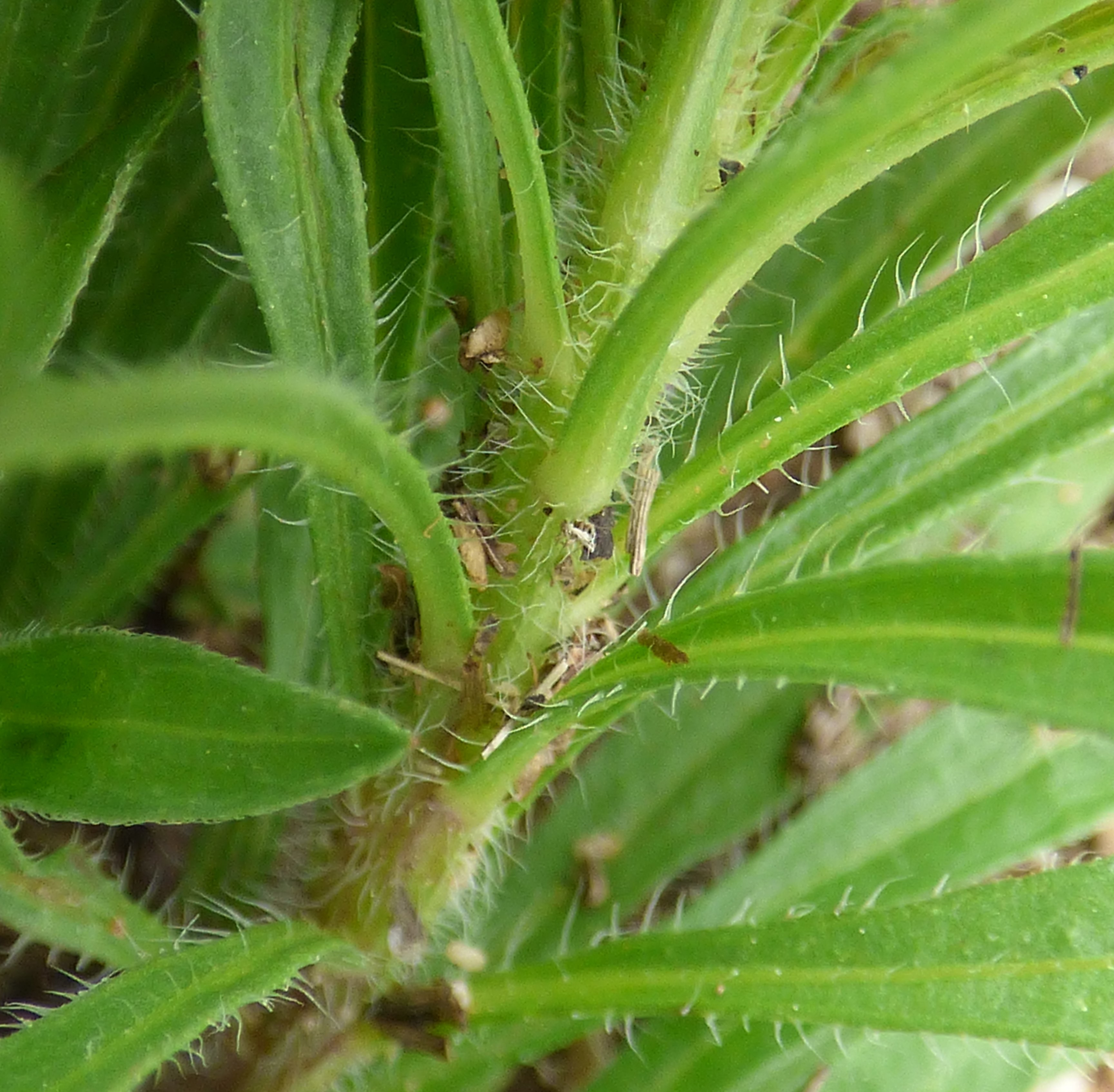
Leaf bases near stem showing projecting hairs

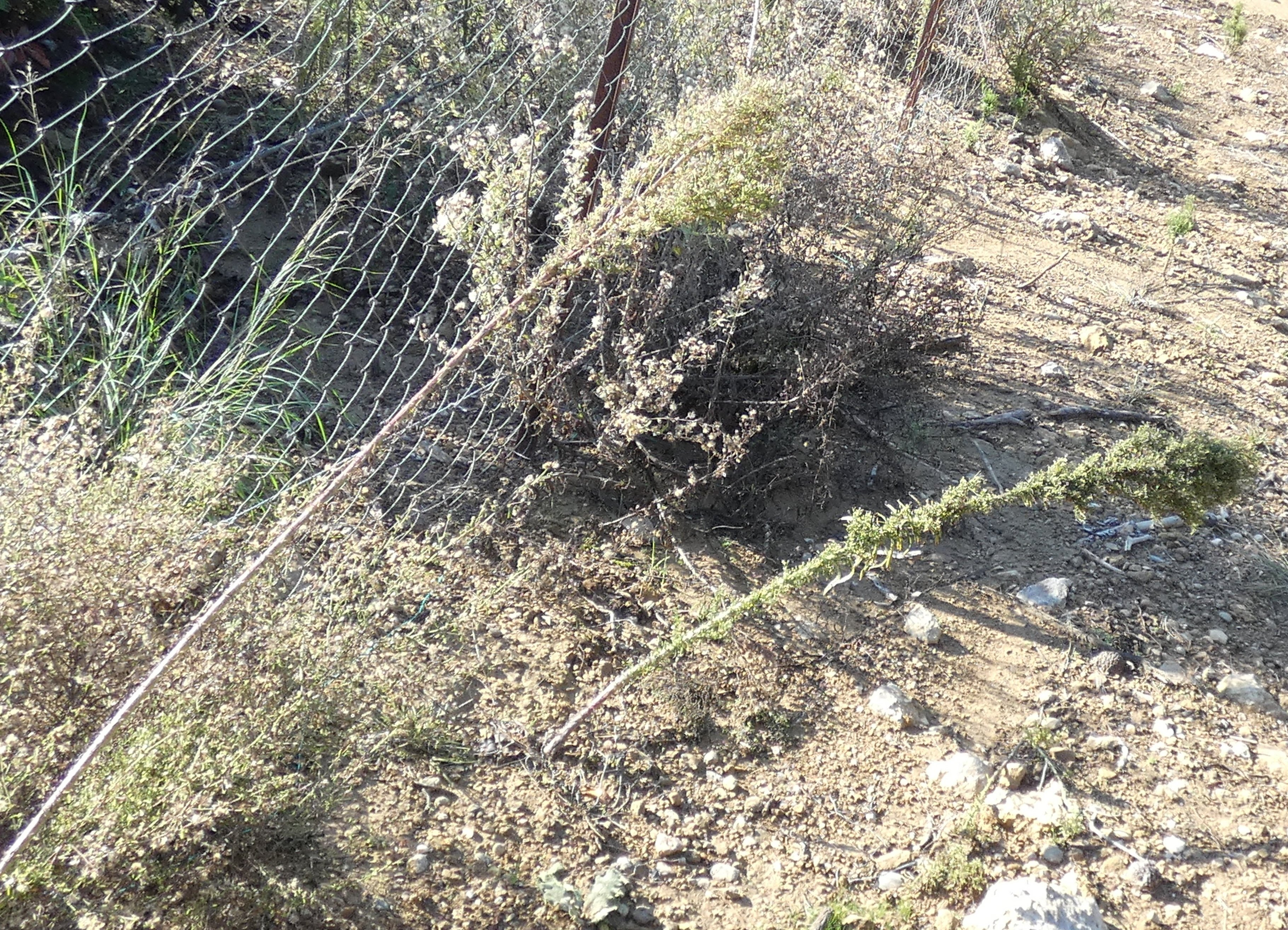
May become large

=== Other forms ===
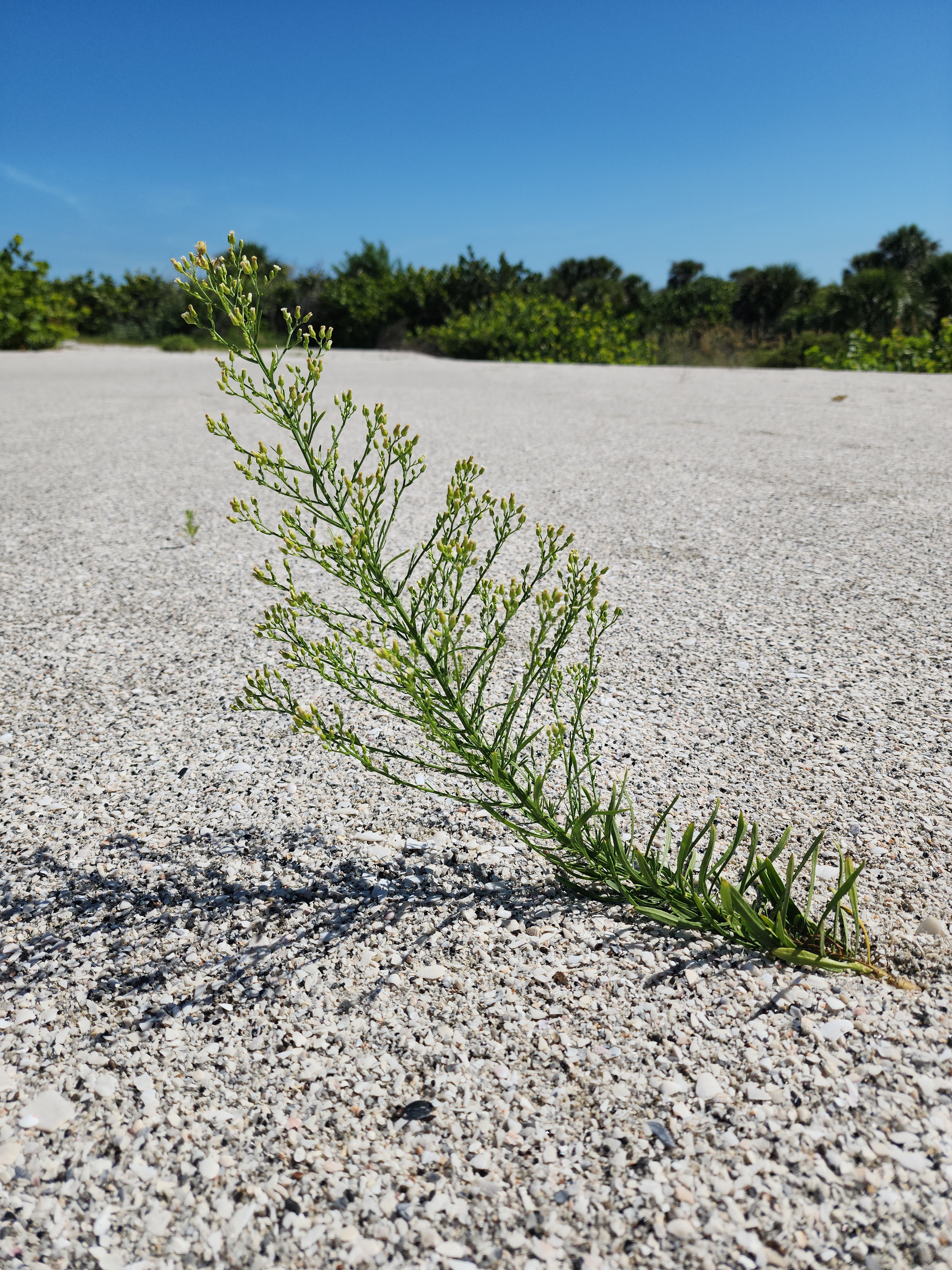
Variety pusillus growing in barrier island shell deposit

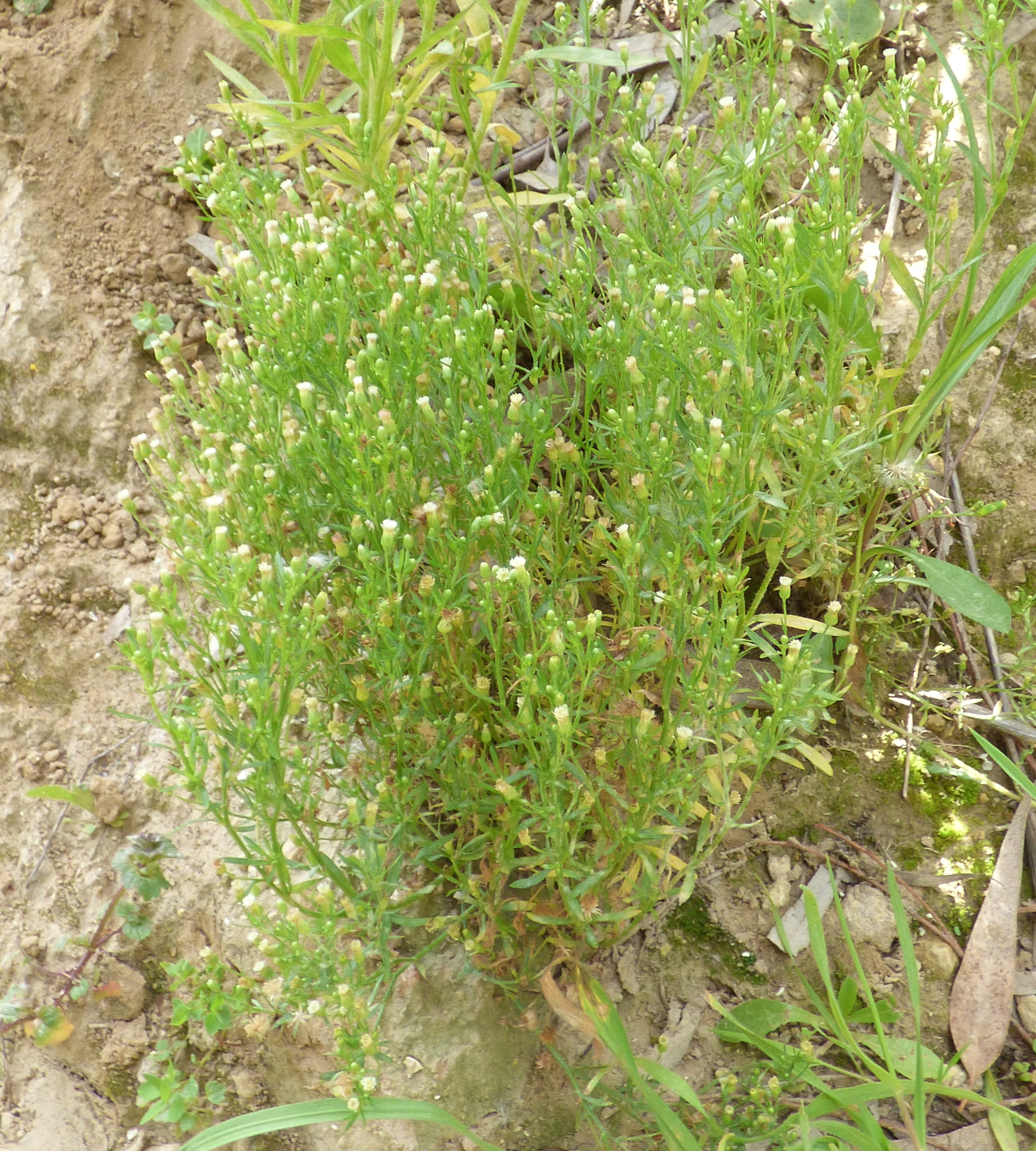
Biennial growing in sand by a river from a surviving stem

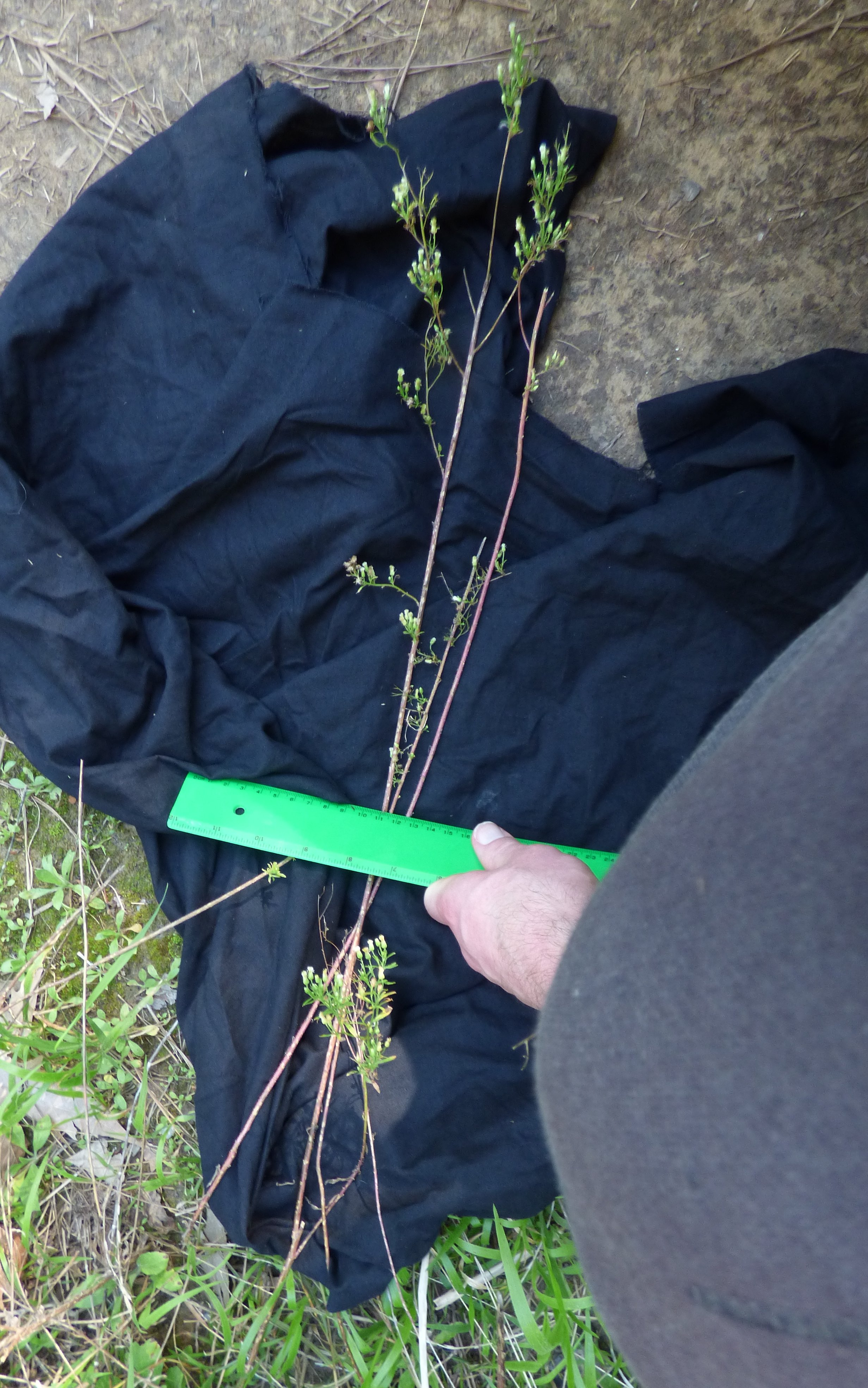
Biennial with ad-hoc branching

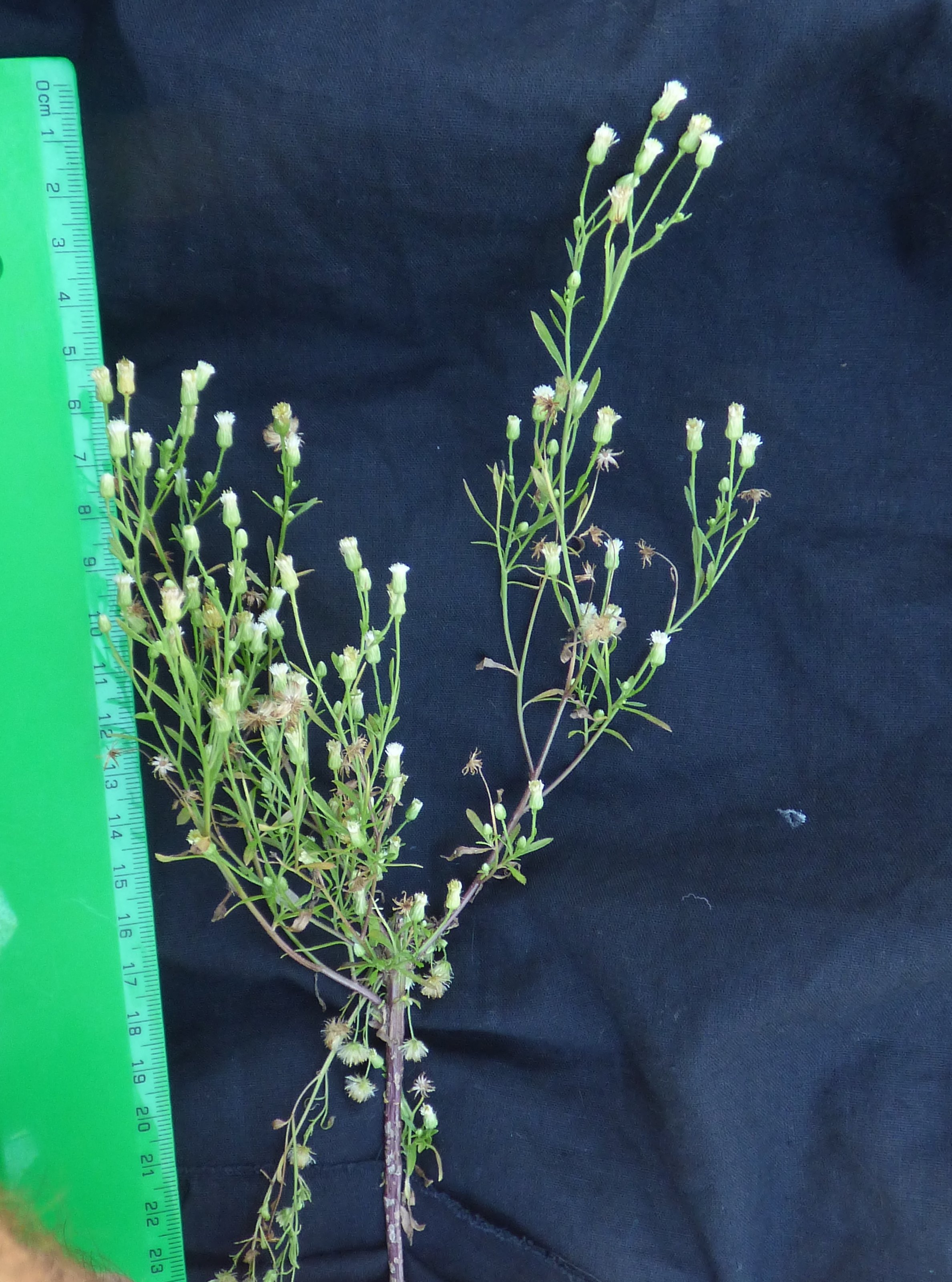
Form with broken biennial stem top

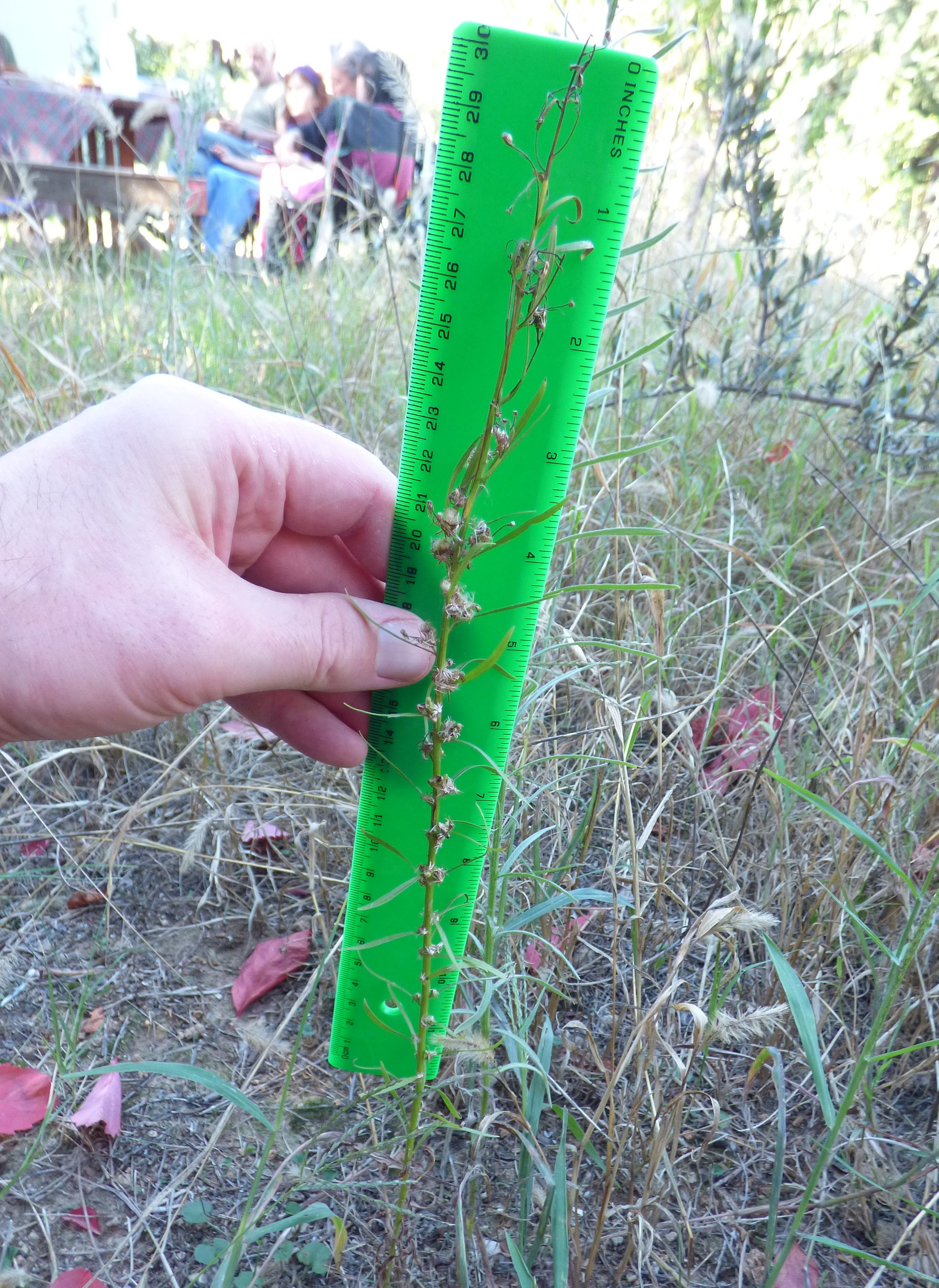
Unusual spike-like form growing in winter

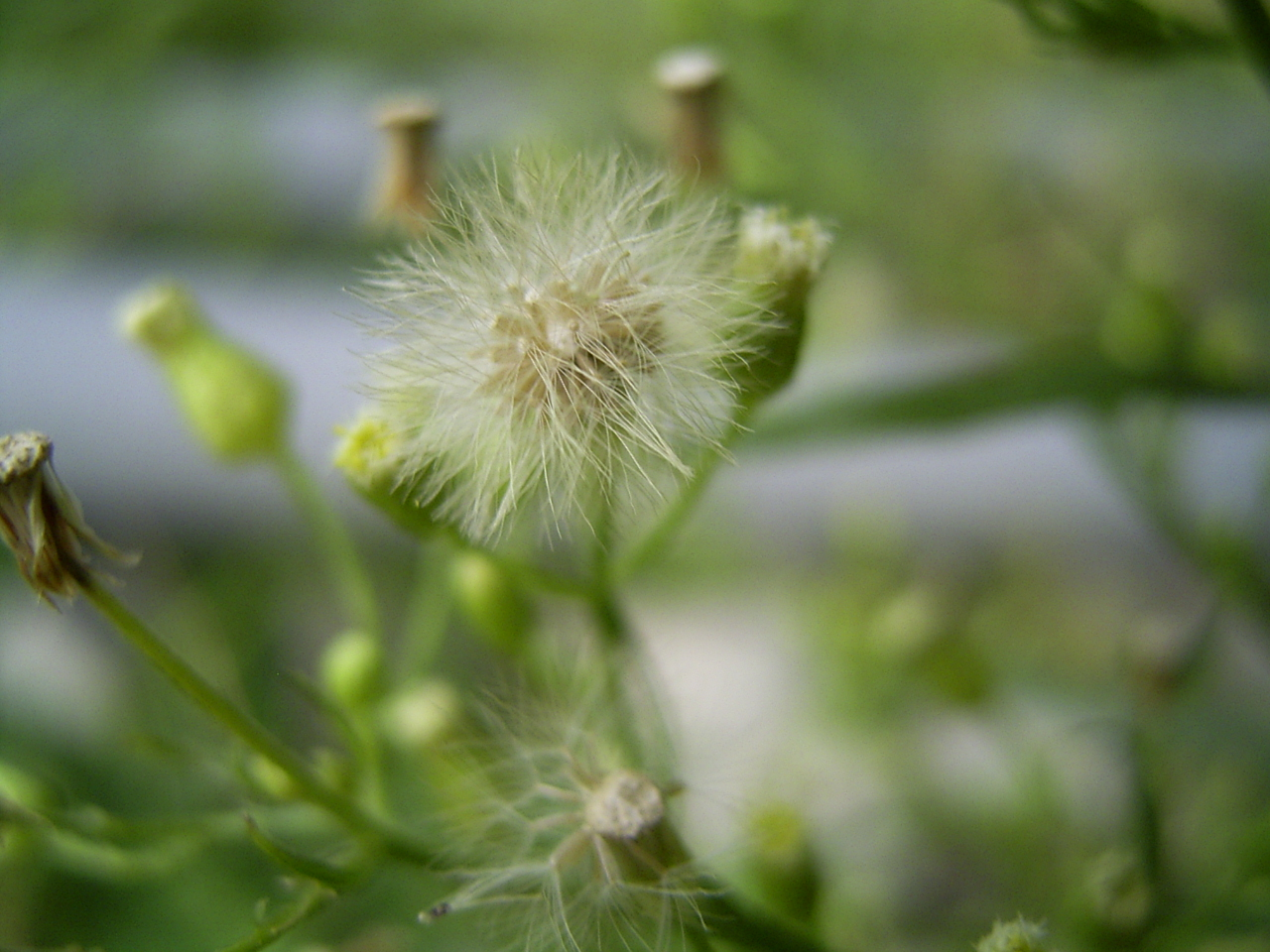
Seeds

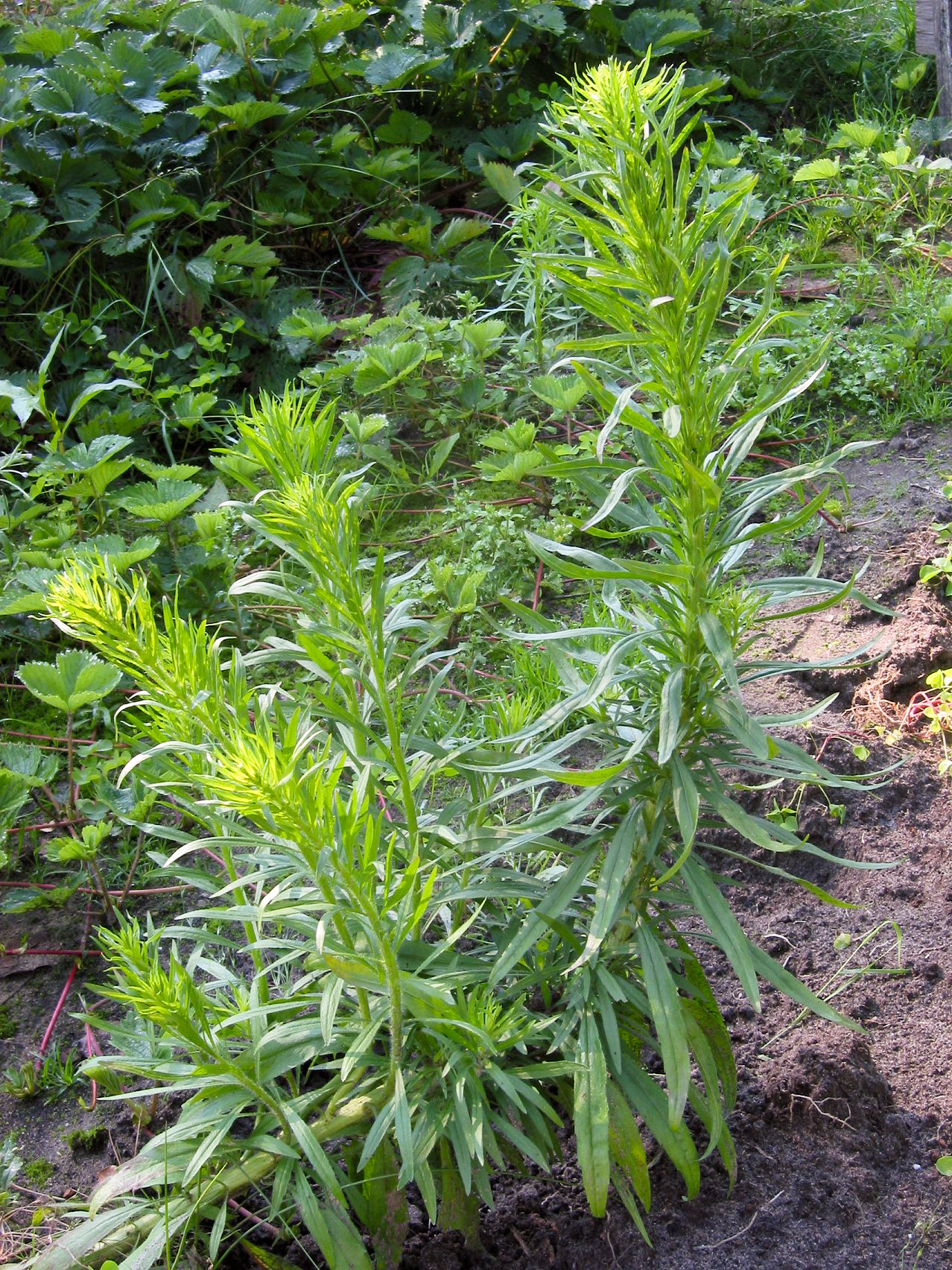

Fasciation in stem

Fasciation of panicle
