= The Jack Benny Program season 15 =

The Jack Benny Program
- Season 15
- No. of episodes: 28

Release
- Original network: NBC
- Original release: September 25, 1964 – April 16, 1965

Season chronology
- ← Previous; Season 14

This is a list of episodes for the fifteenth and final season (1964–65) of the television version of The Jack Benny Program. For this season, the show was moved from CBS to NBC.

== Episodes ==
No. overall	No. in season	Title	Original release date
234	1	"NBC Premiere"	September 25, 1964
Special guests: Chet Huntley, David Brinkley, Doug McClure, and Roberta Shore. The show opens with Huntley and Brinkley doing a newscast on Benny's return to NBC. In his monologue, Jack talks about the move and conducts a press conference with the Marquis Chimps as panelists. Dennis brings his wife and nine children on stage. Jack meets with NBC executives and finds that his new TV studio is a radio studio. Doug McClure and Roberta Shore from The Virginian make cameos. Jack performs again with the Marquis Chimps, who are dressed as The Beatles; they sing "I Want to Hold Your Hand" with Jack.
235	2	"Lucille Ball Show"	October 2, 1964
Special guest: Lucille Ball. Jack is dressed in a tuxedo to introduce his guest Lucille Ball; she comes out dressed as a hillbilly. Jack praises Lucy's skills as a businesswoman, leading to the sketch about a famous woman from history. In this version of Paul Revere's famous ride, Jack as Revere tries to explain to his jealous wife Rachel (Lucy) why he's riding all over the countryside. Singing "Hello Dolly" in honor of Dolly Madison doesn't help matters. She's convinced he's seeing another woman and not even George Washington (Don Wilson) can convince her otherwise. After accidentally knocking Paul out, Rachel has to make the famous "midnight ride."
236	3	"Andy Williams Show"	October 9, 1964
Special guest: Andy Williams. Guest Andy Williams sings "On the Street Where You Live" for the little old ladies of Jack's fan club. On the premise it will be good for his career, Jack talks Andy into attending a gala grand opening with him. He doesn't tell Andy it's at a meat market. Embarrassed to be at such an affair, he's talked into singing "Moon River." On the upside, he wins a free turkey.
237	4	"Income Tax Show"	October 16, 1964
Special guests: James Stewart and his wife Gloria. IRS agents can't believe that Jack Benny could have earned $375,000, yet only spent $19 on entertainment. On his taxes, he claims $3.90 for taking Jimmy and Gloria Stewart to dinner. The agents question the Stewarts and discover that Jack saw them at their favorite restaurant and forced them sit at his table with him and his girlfriend. Benny told them he would pay, but at the end of the meal, he let the Stewarts pick up the tab so they could enjoy the meal as a tax deduction. The $3.90 is what it cost Jack to have his suit cleaned after Gloria dumped a salad on his head.
238	5	"Jack Makes a Comedy Record"	October 23, 1964
Special guest: Bob Hope. Jack has his writers working to churn out a script he and Bob Hope can use on a comedy album the pair are doing together. The script is written so that Jack has all the jokes, but when the two go into the recording studio (located in Hope's mansion), the producer insists the two stars ad-lib -- much to Jack's annoyance.
239	6	"Hillbilly Sketch"	October 30, 1964
Special guest: Connie Francis. In his monologue, Jack confesses that his producer has been using raffle tickets to get the audience members to stay in their seats through the end of the show. Jack and guest Connie Francis argue about whether it's harder to sing or to get laughs. Francis sings "I Was Born Too Late," and a medley of Al Jolson tunes ("Swanee", "My Mammy", and "April Showers"). In the sketch, Jack heads the hillbilly Skinner family who live in a cabin in the Ozarks. His wife (Connie) agrees that they should explain the facts of life to their son, 28-year-old Clem (Dale). Cousin Shem (Don) is in agreement. They perform a parody of "I'm Gonna Sit Right Down and Write Myself a Letter".
240	7	"Jungle Sketch"	November 6, 1964
Special guest: Abbe Lane. Don opens the program by announcing that the show must go on; Jack is brought out in traction in a hospital bed. Guest Abbe Lane sings "I Believe in You." In the main sketch, Jack plays an Albert Schweitzer-type scientist working deep in the jungle to develop a non-skid banana peel. His bombshell wife, Lane, is sick of the rain and bored with their marriage. His assistant, Lawrence of Africa, is there to sweep her off her feet.
241	8	"Jack Loses a Raffle"	November 13, 1964
Special guests: Claudine Longet, Neile Adams, and Jack Pepper. The women of the Beverly Hills Improvement Committee, spearheaded by the wives of David Janssen, Andy Williams, and Steve McQueen, are trying to rid their community of Jack's Maxwell. They sell him a ticket to a raffle that's rigged for him; the prize is a car to replace his old junk heap.
242	9	"The Cat Burglar"	November 20, 1964
Special guest: Joey Bishop. At the poker game at Jack's house with Don, Dennis, and band members Frank and Sammy, cheapskate Benny refuses to open a new deck, forcing the guys to make do with an improvised deck. Much is made of the cat burglar that's been breaking into the homes of Beverly Hills celebrities. Jack warns everyone to lock their doors and stay off the street. Two criminals are hypnotizing a poor dupe into putting on a cat costume and breaking into the homes of snoozing residents to steal their valuables. The surprise appearance of Joey Bishop allows Jack and Rochester to identify the cat burglar.
243	10	"Jack Hires a Cook"	November 27, 1964
After twenty years, Rochester has finally talked Jack into giving him a week's vacation. He's relaxing with his friend Roy (Roy Glenn) at the Palm Valley Inn when he reads a newspaper ad Jack has placed for a household domestic. Thinking he's being replaced, a panicked Rochester phones Don and Dennis and asks for their help. The pair scheme to get rid of the housekeeper by scaring her off. Jack explains to the guys that it's all a misunderstanding and that Miss Dooley was hired to help Rochester, not replace him.
244	11	"Wayne Newton / Louis Nye Show"	December 4, 1964
Special guests: Wayne Newton and Louis Nye. The sketch is a flashback to when Jack discovered Wayne Newton: Benny is performing at a posh garden benefit to send "underprivileged" children of Beverly Hills to camp on the French Riviera. Needing an opening act, Jack gives waiter Wayne a chance to sing, thus giving him his big showbiz break. Comedian Louis Nye emcees the charity event. Newton performs "Falling in Love with Love", "You're Nobody till Somebody Loves You" and "When the Saints Go Marching In."
245	12	"Jack Has a Sick Alligator"	December 11, 1964
Special guest: Paul Lynde. Jack talks an unsuspecting veterinarian into making a house call. He leads the doctor through the dungeon underneath his house, past his ancient security guard (Burt Mustin), and to the surprise patient: a sick alligator that lives in the moat protecting his vault. The doctor surprises even himself by diagnosing the creature's problem.
246	13	"Amateur Night"	December 18, 1964
Jack conducts another of his salary-saving amateur talent shows. Dennis has been banned from the set, but is determined to get on by impersonating various celebrities; he masquerades as a Japanese man dressed like one of The Beatles singing "I Want to Hold Your Hand." Also performing are Otto Kessler (Mel Blanc) as a whiskey-bottle-player, and The Guire Sisters who are proud of their "commercial" name.
247	14	"One Man Show"	December 25, 1964
Special guest: Gisele MacKenzie. In the holiday show, Jack chats informally with the audience. He shows a baby picture of himself at six months of age. The baby has clenched fists; Jack says he's holding a dime in each. Going out into the audience, Jack briefly chats with several of them (he even has one sing a One A Day jingle as a middle commercial), and finds Gisele MacKenzie in the crowd. She's there with an aunt from Toronto who requests Jack translate his jokes into French. He drags MacKenzie onto the stage to do a reprise of their famed violin duet, "Getting to Know You."
248	15	"Jack Jones Show"	January 8, 1965
Special guest: Jack Jones. Guest Jack Jones sings "Bewitched, Bothered and Bewildered" and "It Only Takes a Moment." In the sketch, Benny is the principal of Benedict Arnold High School. Because of the lousy salary Benny pays his teachers, Mr. Jones works four other jobs to pay the bills, Phys Ed teacher Wilson drives a cab and Miss Collins moonlights as a burlesque dancer. Cops show up to arrest Principal Benny for running a bookie operation out of his office.
249	16	"Jack Adopts a Son"	January 22, 1965
Special guest: Milton Berle. In his monologue, Jack demonstrates why his Stradivarius is worth $30,000. He introduces Milton Berle and they exchange insults. In the sketch, Jack plays Jonathan Goodheart, a rich do-gooder who believes "There is no such thing as a bad boy". As he "auditions" several young boys to adopt, he encounters one real stinker who makes him rethink his position: Milton, a brat who only wants to inherit Jack's money.
250	17	"Kingston Trio Show"	January 29, 1965
Special guests: The Kingston Trio. The Kingston Trio (John Stewart, Nick Reynolds, Bob Shane) performs "I'm Going Home" and "The Tijuana Jail". In the sketch, Jack shares a cell with the Trio in a Tijuana jail. Things become quite crowded when Jack's orchestra is also tossed into the hoosegow, along with the Mexican police captain (Vito Scotti) and his two assistants (Don Wilson, Benny Rubin).
251	18	"Jack Visits House of Monkeys"	February 5, 1965
Special guests: Lorrae Desmond and Gene Detroy. The various audience members in line discuss how they got their tickets to the show. Jack's monologue is about his trip to Australia. He introduces Australian singer Lorrae Desmond who performs "Wouldn't It Be Lovely." In the sketch, Jack recalls his first meeting with the Marquis Chimps after seeing them perform in Las Vegas. He goes to the monkey's home to meet their owner, Gene Detroy, and discuss having the act on his TV show. Jack ends up negotiating with the chimps themselves.
252	19	"The Stradivarius Story"	February 12, 1965
Special guest: Stuart Canin. Jack introduces cameraman Charlie Summers (Phil Arnold) and his new wife, Selma (Claire Carleton); she asks Jack why Charlie has never received a raise, and berates him for being a cheapskate. During their "feud", Fred Allen presented a 10-year-old violinist on his radio show, Stuart Canin, who played violin better than Jack. He's now a 38-year-old professor of violin at Oberlin. He plays a selection from La vida breve by Manuel de Falla on a Stradivarius. In the sketch, Jack plays the violin maker Antonio Stradivari, lavishing great care on each instrument. His brother-in-law (Don) says customers only care about his signature on them. His wife (Naomi Stevens) whines that he could make a lot more money if he cranked out the violins mass production-style. After the sketch, Benny and Canin duet on "The Bee".
253	20	"Jack Joins Acrobats"	February 19, 1965
Special guests: The Tangiers. Jack's monologue about TV ratings is interrupted by an audience member from Toledo who wants to take a picture of his family with Jack. Don does the One-A-Day Brand Vitamins commercial with a member of the family. Dennis performs "My Kind of Town (Chicago Is)." In the sketch, Jack plays a Sultan who visits one of his villages, expecting the natives to award him his weight in treasure; he's in for a disappointment. Sultan Jack is supposed to ride on a "flying carpet," but the crew can't get it to work. To cover, a troop of acrobats, The Tangiers, begin performing. Hating to be upstaged, Jack tries to stop them, but becomes part of their act.
254	21	"Rainy Day in Palm Springs"	February 26, 1965
In the monologue, Jack explains how he keeps fit. He also says the American Federation of Musicians has given him a one-way ticket to Australia. Rochester explains the rules to the house to their new housekeeper. Rule Nº 1: You must watch Benny's show. Dennis Day sings the State Farm Insurance jingle, and then "If Ever I Would Leave You" with running commentary from Rochester and the maid. Rochester fills her in on the time Jack fired Dennis Day. The story flashes back to their radio days: Dennis suggests they all drive to Palm Springs for the weekend and it rains the whole time.
255	22	"Jack Brings Ed Up from the Vault"	March 5, 1965
Special guest: Burt Mustin. Jack goes down to his vault to get $10 out and brings up his aging guard, Ed, to show him what modern life is like. It's Ed's first time out in years and he's unprepared for the fast pace of the world. When Ed disappears, Jack calls the police, but it's unnecessary; Ed returns, wanting to go back to the peace and quiet of the vault. Adapted from an April 1955 radio episode.
256	23	"Jack Finds a Double"	March 12, 1965
At the show's rehearsal, Jack constantly makes mistakes. He complains of overwork. Network bigwigs have an idea to ease Jack's load: they've found a Benny look-alike (also played by Benny) who could fill in for the busy star. Before trying to pass the fake Jack off on the sponsor, it's decided the double must first past a test: he has to convince Rochester that he's the real man. The double moves into Benny's home, but Rochester is not fooled. He knows the real Jack isn't humble, kind, modest and generous with his cash.
257	24	"Jack's Navy Buddy Returns"	March 19, 1965
Jack is reunited with his first vaudeville partner, old Navy buddy Stub Walker (Jack Pepper), whom he hasn't seen in 40 years. Stub is retiring from the service and has come to take Jack up on his promise that they would work together again one day. Jack tries him out on the show — the two perform a medley of World War I hits — but Stub can't deliver his lines, and his old routines are out of date.
258	25	"Dennis Opens a Bank Account"	March 26, 1965
Jack's publicity agent has him posing for ridiculous photos, as a Beatle (for a youthful image), a frogman and a surfer (to show him as a man of action). Dennis sings "There'll Be Music" with Don on the piano. Jack can't believe Dennis has never had a bank account, or even set foot inside of a bank. With Dennis' piggy bank in hand, Benny takes him to the bank where they crack the pig open, count the change, and open an account.
259	26	"Jack Appears on a Panel Show"	April 2, 1965
Special guests: Vincent Price, Joyce Brothers, and Angie Dickinson. This is a remake of episode Nº 108, "Panel Discussion Show."
260	27	"Jack Has Dog Trouble"	April 9, 1965
Benny wears his new expensive, Beverly Hills tailor-made suit to his sponsor's home for dinner. Mr. and Mrs. Lewis have a huge dog, Henrietta, that they treat as a spoiled child. She takes to Jack and destroys his new suit. When Mr. Lewis says they're going on vacation, Jack regrets having said he loved their dog.
261	28	"Smothers Brothers Show"	April 16, 1965
Special guests: The Smothers Brothers. The Smothers Brothers introduce the show trying to sing "Love in Bloom." Later, they perform "Boil That Cabbage Down," "I Don't Care," and "I Never Will Marry."; The sketch is set after a 1944 air raid in London when Jack was entertaining troops at the Palladium. He's trapped under an unexploded bomb, and he's discovered by a demolition team, the Brothers. Rather than defuse the bomb, they make him listen to their audition. After 33 years of broadcasting, this was the last regularly scheduled original episode of Jack Benny's radio and TV programs to air. "Ladies and gentlemen, that's the show," Benny said at the close, laughing alongside the Brothers. "Goodnight folks, and I'll be seeing you soon." He made his return to the air on NBC on Nov. 3, 1965, with a new special, The Jack Benny Hour.
