= The Jack Benny Program season 14 =

The Jack Benny Program
- Season 14
- No. of episodes: 28

Release
- Original network: CBS
- Original release: September 24, 1963 – April 21, 1964

Season chronology
- ← Previous; Season 13 Next → Season 15

This is a list of episodes for the fourteenth season (1963–64) of the television version of The Jack Benny Program.

== Episodes ==
No. overall	No. in season	Title	Original release date
206	1	"Billy Graham Show"	September 24, 1963
Special guests: Billy Graham and Sonny Liston. Season opener. Don, Jack and Dennis do the middle State Farm commercial as Peter, Paul and Mary, singing special lyrics to "Green, Green". At Billy Graham's request, the skit is redone according to a new formula in which there are no insults to anyone, and everyone is quiet and sweet; Dennis reports that he went to UCLA over the summer. Billy Graham gives a short inspirational message.
207	2	"Robert Goulet Show"	October 1, 1963
Special guest: Robert Goulet. Jack makes his entrance from the opposite side of the stage, and stands with his back to the audience out of force of habit. Don rolls out a carpet, and Goulet comes out vacuuming it—he had failed to read the fine print on his contract. Goulet tells about growing up in Canada, tells a Nelson Eddy joke, discusses playing nightclubs with Jack, and sings "This Is All I Ask". Jack questions Goulet's reputation as a ladies' man, leading into the sketch: In flashback, Jack sees Goulet and his girl at a Hollywood nightclub; Goulet's girl makes a pass at Jack. Later viewers learn that in fact Jack's girl made a pass at Goulet.
208	3	"Riverboat Sketch"	October 8, 1963
Special guest: Carol Burnett. Don, Carol and Jack make their entrance jumping through large doorways covered with paper; Jack can't break through and Carol has to do it for him. Jack and Carol talk about her desire to become a director, and she makes some suggestions about his show. She sings "Sweet Georgia Brown". In the sketch, Jack, Don, and Carol play riverboat card sharps out to cheat each other.
209	4	"Tall Cowboy Sketch"	October 15, 1963
Special guest: Clint Walker. Jack talks about writing his autobiography in the monologue. He brings out guest Clint Walker and they compare what they have in common: both were born in Illinois, were in the Navy, and have blue eyes. To check, Jack climbs up onto Walker to look into his eyes. Walker sings "Navajo Trail". The main sketch, in which Jack hopes to get a part in Clint's new movie, is a remake of the one from episode Nº 96, "Gary Cooper Show."
210	5	"Johnny Carson Show"	October 22, 1963
Special guest: Johnny Carson. Jack tells guest Johnny Carson he should be more versatile on The Tonight Show, so Johnny does card tricks, plays the drums, sings, and dances to "Ballin' the Jack." They do a mock version of the Tonight Show where we can hear Carson's thoughts about the guest he's interviewing (Benny). Don's middle commercial has him conducting a "man on the street" interview, asking various people what they think of State Farm Insurance. Carson can't believe how Jack never seems to age. Back in the dressing room, he finds out Jack's secret. The Jack Benny "replacement" dummy makes another appearance.
211	6	"Jack Directs a Film"	October 29, 1963
Special guests: James Stewart and Gloria Stewart. Jack hears Jimmy and Gloria Stewart say some nice things about him on a TV talk show and decides to thank them in person. Visiting the couple on the set of the movie they're making, Jack can't help but offer advice on how the couple should play the scene and how the director should film it. Soon, the production is in shambles.
212	7	"Ed Sullivan Show"	November 5, 1963
Special guests: Ed Sullivan and Monique LeMaire. The sketch is a remake of the one from episode Nº 110, "Ed Sullivan / Genevieve Show," with Monique LeMaire as the defendant. During Jack's cross-examination of "Madame Duval", he sneaks in a middle commercial by trying to tie her State Farm bumper sticker into the scene of the crime. Defense attorney Sullivan objects, demanding that everyone in the courtroom show theirs. They do (including the judge, draping a giant one across his bench).
213	8	"Robinson Crusoe Sketch"	November 19, 1963
Jack tries to get out of paying a 14-cent overdue fine by presenting the librarian with a note from his doctor. Dennis checks out books by Gibbon and Velben so he'll look smart when he walks past UCLA on his way home. The sketch is a take-off of Robinson Crusoe with Jack as the bearded castaway and Dennis as his man Friday.
214	9	"Jack Takes a Boat to Hawaii"	November 26, 1963
Special guest: Jayne Mansfield. Jack is waiting to take a ship back home after vacationing in Hawaii. Schlepperman (Sam Hearn), a character from Jack's radio days, appears to present Jack with a lei made of chicken livers. Rochester arrives late, having been crowned King Kamehameha VI by the islanders. On the ship board, Dennis tells Jack he swam all the way to Hawaii, then jumps overboard to swim home. Falling asleep in a deck chair, Jack dreams the heavyset woman sitting beside him is Jayne Mansfield and that she finds him irresistible. He proposes but she's concerned about their age difference. She coos the song "You're Just Too Marvelous for Words" to Jack and agrees to meet him for dinner. He chases after her, and then is awakened by a huge kiss from the chubby woman.
215	10	"Dennis Drives Jack to the Hospital"	December 3, 1963
Jack is trying to work on a Julius Caesar sketch, while being pursued by a female fan. Wanting to take over the show for a few weeks, Dennis hatches a plan to make Jack think he's becoming unhinged. He hires an impressionist to make phone calls, as Benny, to receptionists, doctors — anyone and everyone. Naturally, Jack doesn't recall having talked to any of these people and begins to question his sanity. Upon hearing his own voice, which wasn't coming from his mouth, Jack checks himself into a hospital.
216	11	"Three Musketeers Sketch"	December 10, 1963
Jack talks about golfing in his monologue. He chats with a TV statistician who has monitored all of Jack's programs and found that Benny has told 80,000 jokes... and only gotten 30,000 laughs. Dennis storms on stage and says he's quitting because Jack has called him stupid 2,000 times. In the sketch, it's back to the 18th century as Jack, Don, and Dennis play the Three Musketeers. Jack's character gets into a romance with an attractive spy.
217	12	"George Jessel / Amateur Show"	December 24, 1963
Special guest: George Jessel. Jack hosts another of his amateur talent contests. Contestants this round include a barefoot tap dancer, a dog act, a drunk acrobat, and a Mexican musical group — The Tijuana Troubadours, led by Mel Blanc. George Jessel accompanies his nephew who's supposedly a great tuba player; the kid gives Jack and George grief all throughout the show.
218	13	"Jack Alone on New Year's Eve"	December 31, 1963
Jack gives the cast the night off and does the show himself. He talks with Mary Livingstone on the phone and takes questions from the audience, some legit, some planted. When asked his age, he responds that everything is marked down after Christmas. Jack has the audience sing "Auld Lang Syne" and read the State Farm commercial while he provides sounds effects. He also talks about Dennis Day's Christmas present, his Maxwell, Phil Harris in Korea, and George Burns.
219	14	"How Jack Met George Burns"	January 7, 1964
Special guest: George Burns. Old buddies Benny and Burns trade jokes and insults. George needles him about his pettiness in golfing before recalling their first meeting during the vaudeville days. In the flashback, they are each staying in a seedy boarding house when they decide to team up. Their act, full of awful jokes and ridiculous songs, is a flop. Jack, being Jack, demands a raise, even though they aren't making a dime. George claims their problem is Benny; anyone could do Jack's part better — even the landlord's daughter. That girl's name: Gracie Allen.
220	15	"Peter, Paul and Mary Show"	January 14, 1964
Special guests: Peter, Paul and Mary. Peter, Paul and Mary sing "Blowin' in the Wind." To show that a folk song can be written from any bit of folklore, they perform "Waukegan", a song they wrote based around Jack's age, cheapness, and other faults. Jack invites the group to his home and tries to talk them into recording the dreadful tune he wrote, "When You Say 'I Beg Your Pardon', Then I'll Come Back to You." When his accompanist Ned (Ben Lessy) arrives, he has PP&M sing his composition. As with every previous performer, they want nothing to do with the crummy song. Ned tells Jack it would have been a hit if they'd recorded it. Jack says not to worry; he had a tape recorder hidden in the piano.
221	16	"Nat King Cole Show"	January 21, 1964
Special guest: Nat King Cole. Nat King Cole opens the show singing "Day In, Day Out." He exchanges some ribbing with Jack and performs "When I Fall in Love." Jack invites a few musicians from the orchestra {Sammy Weiss, Frank Remley, Wayne Songer) to join him in his dressing room to rehearse "Sweet Sue," a number they're going to perform with Cole. A fight between the musicians leaves Sammy the drummer out of commission, so Nat promises to have his cousin fill in. On the show, the "cousin" is a five-year-old (James Bradley, Jr.) who can drum louder than Jack's violin solo.
222	17	"Bobby Darin Show"	January 28, 1964
Special guest: Bobby Darin. After a huge compliment from Bobby Darin, Jack is convinced he's the perfect man to play him in the movie of his life. Jack invites him to move in for a few days to get to know the "real" Benny. (Bobby learns that Jack takes in dry cleaning, has a recording studio in his living room, and isn't 39.) By the time they're ready to sign the contract, Bobby has turned into an exact copy of Jack — including the greediness.
223	18	"Don Breaks His Leg"	February 4, 1964
Special guest: Miss Beverly Hills. Don pretends to break his leg so that his doofus son Harlow can fill in for him on the show. Harlow reads "Ode to California" (in which he sneaks in a few words about Jell-O). Jack's new talent find, Miss Beverly Hills, sings "Only One Man" and then shocks him by launching into her striptease performance. Also, Jack tries to get the upper hand with a change-making vending machine.
224	19	"How Jack Found Dennis"	February 11, 1964
Jack explains how he manages to look so good on TV after all these years: long shots. In close-ups, he's nothing but wrinkles. Dennis brings out his own palm tree as scenery and performs "Cocktails for Two." It's Dennis' 24th anniversary of working with Jack. Benny tells his version of how he discovered Day and hired him for his radio show: Jack hears Dennis' demo record and sets out to find him, following him through a parade of jobs (fish market, ice cream shop) from which he was fired. Jack finally locates him working in the kitchen of a Chinese restaurant.
225	20	"The Final LeBlanc Sketch"	February 18, 1964
Jack receives a call from a psychiatrist, Dr. Johnson (Herbert Rudley), asking him to identify a man who keeps repeating Benny's name. The delirious man is Jack's violin teacher, Professor LeBlanc (Mel Blanc). In flashbacks, we witness the crash and burn of Professor LeBlanc as Benny's heinous violin fiddling eventually drives him insane. Jack decides the only way to cure the man is to play his instrument, and for the first time he plays beautifully. Realizing he's not a failure, LeBlanc regains his memory. Jack orders Dr. Johnson not to tell anyone that he's a good violinist; he makes much more money being a bad one.
226	21	"Jack and Dennis Do Impersonations"	February 25, 1964
Special guest: Danny Kaye. Jack fulfills viewers' requests. One asks for Dennis to sing "Love In Bloom," but he doesn't know it. Someone asks Jack to give Harlow a break, so Harlow impersonates Sophie Tucker in the State Farm commercial. A woman wants Jack to put her husband's animal on the show; the husband's promptly eaten by his lion. One request is to have Jackie Gleason back on. Complete with two dancing girls, Jack plays Gleason in a take-off Gleason's variety show. Dennis impersonates Crazy Guggenheim. Benny's promise to impersonate Danny Kaye is interrupted by the real Kaye. The final request for Jack to play a classical number on his violin is stopped when the lion chases him from the stage.
227	22	"Jack Redecorates His House"	March 3, 1964
After taking abuse from his card game buddies about a hideous chair he's just had reupholstered, Jack hires a sexy home decorator to update his home. Her ideas involve zebra stripes.
228	23	"Jack Is a Boxing Manager"	March 17, 1964
Jack visits a restaurant owned by an ex-boxer and begins daydreaming about being an old-time fight manager. His protege, Dennis "Kid Dynamite" Day, thinks "Doc" Benny is the best because he lets him fight twice a day. A gorgeous blond, however, stands in the way of Doc making some quick money.
229	24	"Jack Renews His Driver's License"	March 24, 1964
Jack rehearses some Dixieland music with members of his band at the studio. He does a public service announcement for safe driving and finds out his driver's license has expired. On the way to the golf course, Jack and Don drop by the DMV to have it renewed. Renewing should be simple, but Jack has trouble with everyone: A man who doesn't work there accepts his $3 fee and runs, a grumpy guard accuses him of cheating, and the man giving the eye exam can't see. Getting his photo taken is an ordeal as the photographer thinks he's Erich von Stroheim directing a film.
230	25	"The Lettermen Show"	March 31, 1964
Special guests: The Lettermen. Jack's monologue is interrupted by Dennis Day who comes out with props, prepared to sing. He's angry to learn that The Lettermen would be doing the songs. The Lettermen perform "Love Is a Many Splendored Thing". As they begin their second number, Dennis picks them off one by one and finishes their song. Jack imagines what it would be like if he had gone to college. His roommates are played by The Lettermen; Jack is a freshman who looks 39. In class, chemistry is taught by a nutty German professor who plays "Yankee Doodle" on his flasks. When he writes the chemical formula for a nuclear bomb on the chalk board; it explodes. Tired of Jack's money-making schemes, the roommates hope to catch him in the act of selling answers to tests. The buyer of the answers is the nutty German professor.
231	26	"Jack Goes to an Allergy Doctor"	April 7, 1964
Jack holds a meeting in his dressing room to grouse at the cast and crew about a sloppy show. He begins to itch and, thinking he's having a reaction to something, goes to see a doctor where the patients scratch and sneeze in unison. Hating needles, Benny marches out mid-exam in search of another specialist. He settles on an odd one who performs some goofy and very unscientific tests on the itching patient. The source of Jack's irritation turns out not to be a "what", but a "who": Dennis Day.
232	27	"Harlow Gets a Date"	April 14, 1964
Don has arranged for Harlow to take the sponsor's daughter on a date. That gives Jack and Don just three days to change his clod of a son into a suave man of the world. Harlow puts his newly found charms to work for the wrong purposes.
233	28	"I Am the Fiddler"	April 21, 1964
In his final show for CBS, Jack reminisces about the old days of radio and its ability to paint pictures in the mind. To assist, Mel Blanc demonstrates his various voices. Dennis sings "I'm Glad There Is You". Don's middle commercial starts by angrily informing Jack that, as his announcer, he's not required to handle props. He then pulls out a pitch pipe and sings the State Farm jingle. The main sketch is a remake of the one from episode Nº 73, "The Fiddler."
