= Mobay =

Chemical company in Pittsburgh, PA

- Type: Joint venture
- Industry: Chemicals, manufacturing, marketing
- Founded: May 18, 1954; 72 years ago
- Defunct: January 1, 1992; 34 years ago
- Fate: Dissolved into Miles
- Headquarters: Pittsburgh, Pennsylvania, U.S.
- Products: Polyurethanes, dyes, agrochemicals
- Parent: Monsanto (before 1967); Bayer AG
- Subsidiaries: Chemagro (insecticides); Verona (dyestuffs)

Mobay Chemical Corporation, based in Pittsburgh, Pennsylvania, was a joint venture of Monsanto Company and Bayer founded in 1954 to market polyurethanes in the United States.

Monsanto was forced to sell its shares in the company to Bayer in 1967. Mobay, along with Miles Laboratories, was a member of Bayer's menagerie of companies in the US. Bayer did not own the US rights to its name.

After a first failed attempt of appearing under the Bayer USA Inc. name in the US, Bayer consolidated its US operations under the Miles name through a restructuring in 1992.

== Military issues ==
Mobay was one of the suppliers of the dioxin-contaminated 2,4,5-T used to produce the Agent Orange sprayed in Operation Ranch Hand (1962-1972). Prior to the Gulf War, in April 1990, Mobay and Occidental Chemical Corporation refused to sell chemicals to the Department of Defense for military use (particularly, with thionyl chloride, a chemical needed for the production of sarin.) The government considered filing suit against Mobay and Occidental for violating Title III of the Defense Production Act of 1950, which gives the government the power to requisition supplies for warfare. According to congresswoman Helen Delich Bentley (Rep., MD), when challenged, they told the Army, "It is policy—so sue us."
