= One A Day =

Bayer multivitamin brand

- Product type: Multivitamins
- Current owner: Bayer
- Country: U.S.
- Introduced: 1940
- Markets: Worldwide
- Previous owners: Miles Laboratories
- Website: www.oneaday.com

One A Day (sometimes referred to as One-A-Day) is a product family of multivitamins produced by the Bayer corporation. One A Day was introduced in 1940 by Miles Laboratories.

Bayer markets fifteen products in the One A Day line:

- Cholesterol Plus
- Energy
- Energy Advantage_{2}O
- Essential
- Maximum
- Men's Health
- Men's 50+ Advantage
- Teen Advantage
- VitaCraves Gummies
- Women's
- Women's_{2}O
- Women's 50+ Advantage
- Women's Active Metabolism
- Women's Active Mind & Body
- Women's Prenatal

Bayer had heavily marketed a "WeightSmart" brand, but it was discontinued after the United States Federal Trade Commission recovered $3.2 million as part of $25 million settlement from Bayer, alleging that Bayer had falsely claimed that the product led to weight loss.

One-A-Day Women's multivitamin was tested by ConsumerLab.com in their Multivitamin and Multimineral Supplements Review of 38 of the leading multivitamin/multimineral products sold in the U.S. and Canada. This product passed ConsumerLab's 2011 test, which included testing of selected index elements, their ability to disintegrate in solution per United States Pharmacopeia guidelines, lead contamination threshold set in California Proposition 65, and meeting U.S. Food and Drug Administration (FDA) labeling requirements.
