= Nervine =

Miles Laboratories sedative patent medicine (1884–ca.1970)

Nervine was a patent medicine tonic with sedative effects introduced in 1884 by Dr. Miles Medical Company (later Miles Laboratories which was absorbed into Bayer). The name is a cognate of 'Nerve', and the implication was that the material worked to calm nervousness.

== Formulation ==
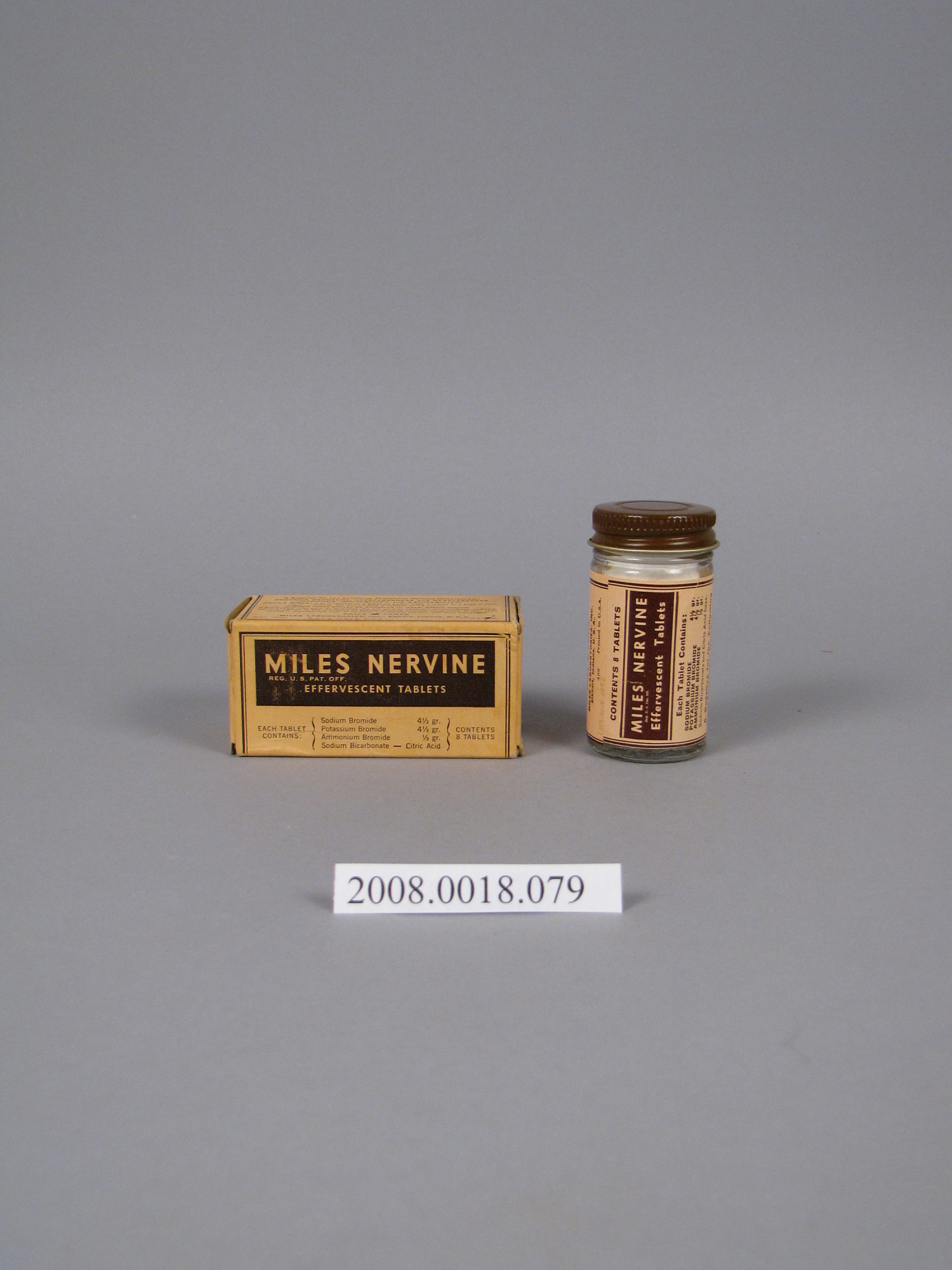
Miles Nervine Tablets, including the box and the vial. 1940

The original form of Nervine was in a liquid form containing bromide, sold in a glass bottle with the label "Dr. Miles' Restorative Nervine". Later versions of Nervine replaced the bromide, which is dangerous if consumed in high quantities, with an antihistamine. This was because in 1976, the FDA had removed bromides from over-the-counter medications.

One form of Nervine was formulated with the primary active ingredients sodium bromide, ammonium bromide, and potassium bromide, combined with sodium bicarbonate and citric acid in an effervescent tablet.

== Modern appropriation of term ==
In the late 20th and early 21st century, promulgators of alternative medicine and herbalism have begun to use the term nervine as an adjective. This is not a term used by mainstream medicine, where anxiolytic is the preferred term.

Euell Gibbons uses the term as a generic noun in his books published in the 1960s.

== See also ==
- Bromide (language)
