= Benzalkonium chloride/lidocaine =

Topically applied first-aid antiseptic and anesthetic

Combination of
- Benzalkonium chloride: Antiseptic
- Lidocaine: Topical anaesthetic

Clinical data
- Trade names: Bactine, others
- AHFS/Drugs.com: Consumer Drug Information
- Routes of administration: Topical
- ATC code: N01BB52 (WHO)

Legal status
- Legal status: US: OTC

Benzalkonium chloride/lidocaine (trade name Bactine among others) is an antiseptic, first-aid treatment distributed by Wellspring Pharmaceutical Corporation. Bactine was developed in 1947 and first marketed in 1950 by Miles Laboratories. It is a topically applied first aid liquid with active ingredients benzalkonium chloride (an antiseptic) and lidocaine (a topical anaesthetic). As an antiseptic, Bactine can help to prevent infections, while the topical anesthetic in Bactine serves to numb the surface of a body part and temporarily relieve pain and itching on the skin.

Bactine was introduced in an article in the May 14, 1950, issue of the Sunday newspaper supplement Parade magazine, where an article noted that "Sometime in the next two weeks you may be able to buy what promises to be one of the most useful antiseptics ever put in your medicine chest."

Originated by Miles Laboratories, Bayer continued to produce Bactine after it acquired Miles in 1995. Bactine was acquired from Bayer by Wellspring in 2015.
