= Miles Laboratories =

American pharmacetical and health care company

- Industry: Health care
- Founded: 1884
- Founder: Dr. Franklin L. Miles
- Defunct: 1995
- Fate: Renamed under the North American division of Bayer AG
- Successor: North American division of Bayer AG
- Headquarters: Elkhart, Indiana, U.S.
- Products: Alka-Seltzer, Flintstones Vitamins, One-A-Day Vitamins and Bactine
- Parent: Bayer AG (1979–1995)

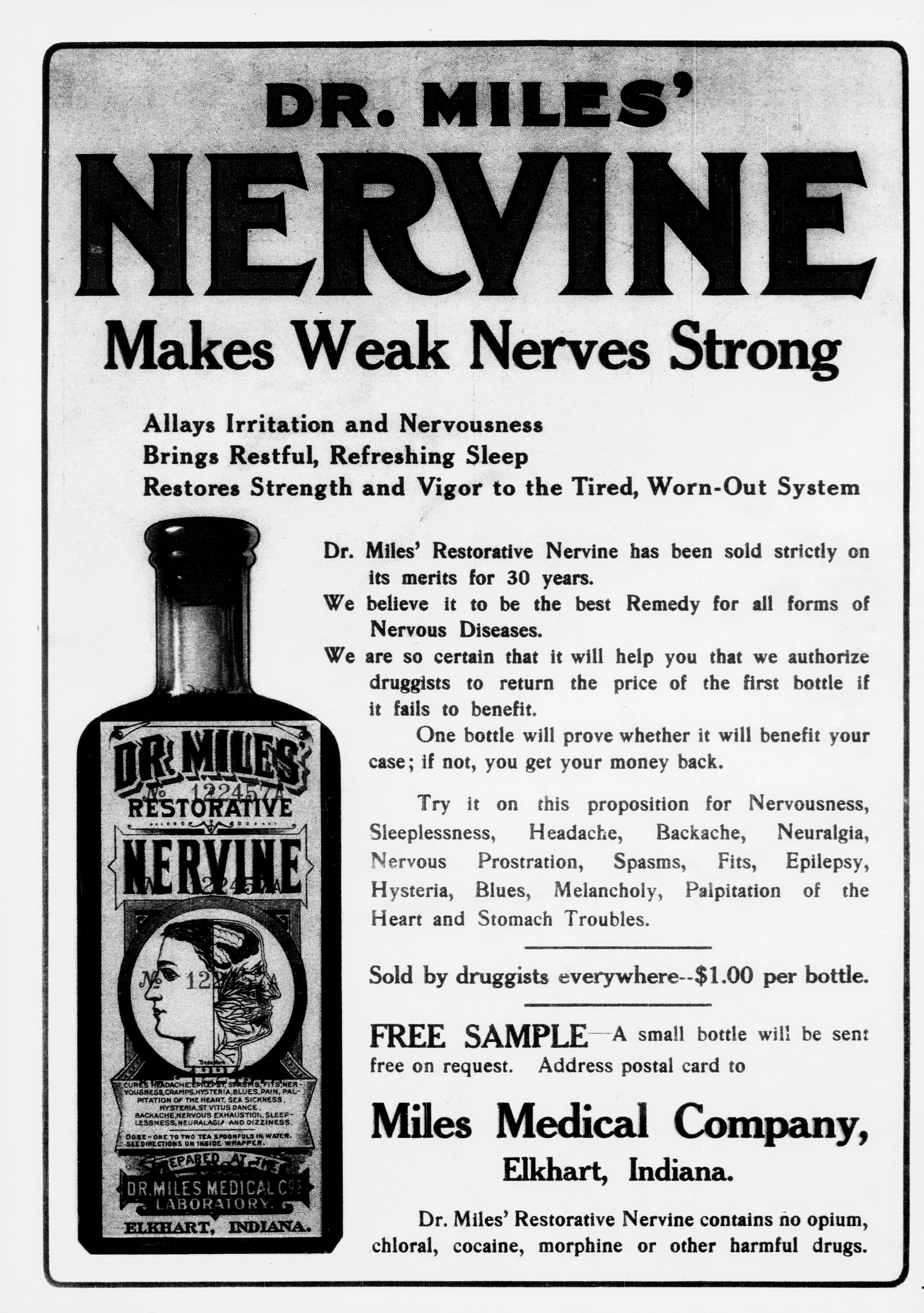
Advertisement for the original company in 1906

Miles Laboratories (originally the Dr. Miles Medical Company) was a pharmaceutical company founded in Elkhart, Indiana, in 1884 by Dr. Franklin L. Miles, a specialist in the treatment of eye and ear disorders, with an interest in the connection of the nervous system to overall health. The company is known for inventing products such as Alka-Seltzer and One-A-Day vitamins.

Miles operated as an independent firm from 1884 until 1979 and as a wholly owned subsidiary of Bayer AG from 1979 until 1995. At the company's peak in the 1960s and 1970s, it employed 3,300 people and produced more than two dozen products.

In 1995, it was consolidated into the parent corporation.

== History ==
By 1890, the sales success of his patent medicine tonic, "Dr. Miles Restorative Nervine," in treating "nervous" ailments (including "nervousness or nervous exhaustion, sleeplessness, hysteria, headache, neuralgia, backache, pain, epilepsy, spasms, fits, and St. Vitus' dance") led him to develop a mail order medicine business. Miles also published Medical News, from 1884—a thinly disguised marketing vehicle for Nervine, now referenced as advertorials. Nervine remained on the market as a "calmative" until the late 1960s; Miles' bromide sedative syrup is considered "a precursor to modern tranquilizers."

The company was at the heart of the 1911 antitrust Supreme Court case Dr. Miles Medical Co. v. John D. Park & Sons Co. After John D. Park & Sons Co. profited off of Dr. Miles' advertising while selling his products at rock bottom prices, the Supreme Court ruled that resale price maintenance, a form of vertical restraint, is illegal per se.

In 1932, the company became Dr. Miles Laboratories; then, in 1935, the name was again changed, to Miles Laboratories. In 1947, Miles Laboratories purchased Chemical Specialties Inc.

During World War II the company produced various goods for the US war effort, including packaged coffee products for military rations.

The company already made One-A-Day Vitamins and later introduced Chocks, the first chewable multivitamins for children. Flintstones Vitamins came later.

In 1970, to complement its existing vitamin manufacturing division, Miles laboratories merged with Adventist-owned Worthington Foods of Ohio, opening a new Worthington Foods factory in 1972 to quadruple production capacity for a line of vegetarian foods based on the meat analogue developed over the previous two decades by Worthington, to be marketed under the brand name Morning Star Farm Foods, Morning Star was sold with Worthington Foods to Kellogg's in 1999.

In 1979, Bayer AG—after its U.S. and Canadian aspirin business was seized as enemy property during World War I and subsequently sold as enemy assets—purchased Miles Laboratories and its subsidiary Miles Canada to reestablish a presence in North America. In the process, Bayer also acquired products such as Alka-Seltzer, Flintstones Vitamins, One-a-Day, Bactine, S.O.S Soap Pads, and Worthington Foods.

Bayer continued to operate Miles Laboratories and developed many drugs based upon biological extracts, such as Kogenate, Gamimune-N and other immunoglobulins, and Trasylol, as well as diagnostic products such as blood glucose test strips and glucose meters. Miles also owned Cutter Laboratories, manufacturer of such diverse products as insect repellent and synthetic human Factor VIII clotting factor for hemophiliacs.

In 1992, Bayer AG moved the United States headquarters of Miles to Pittsburgh, Pennsylvania, from Elkhart, Indiana. In 1994, the Bayer moved the Miles headquarters to New Jersey. That year, Bayer announced plans to change the name of the company. On April 1, 1995, Bayer retired the Miles brand name from all products and facilities after Bayer had acquired Sterling Winthrop the previous year.

Miles Laboratories also operated sites in other parts of the United States, including West Haven, Connecticut, which are now part of Bayer AG. In 2007, the Miles Laboratories campus of Bayer AG in Connecticut was sold to Yale University and now comprises Yale West campus, including art and anthropological restoration and preservation, energy research, nanobiology, systems biology, and Yale Nursing School.

In 2003, the 1-million-sq-ft Miles Laboratories building was sold to the non-profit charity Feed The Children for $1 as a part of Bayer Diagnostics "Develop Northern Indiana" marketing campaign. The low sale price of $1 enticed many companies to purchase the plant, but Bayer Diagnostics liked the long-term financial plan that Feed The Children had for the campus.

Between 2011 and 2012, the former Miles campus, a 26-acre site located in Elkhart, was vacated and the remaining buildings were demolished.
