= The Jack Benny Program season 12 =

The Jack Benny Program
- Season 12
- No. of episodes: 26

Release
- Original network: CBS
- Original release: October 15, 1961 – April 22, 1962

Season chronology
- ← Previous; Season 11 Next → Season 13

This is a list of episodes for the twelfth season (1961–62) of the television version of The Jack Benny Program.

== Episodes ==
No. overall	No. in season	Title	Original release date
152	1	"Season Premiere"	October 15, 1961
Special guests: Phil Silvers, Betty Johnson, Jack Paar, Alan King, and Garry Moore. After the monologue, in which Jack and Phil trade insults, Betty sings "My Kind of Guy." The sketch is a remake of the one from episode Nº 17, "Fred Allen Show": Silvers tries to get Jack's sponsor to replace him with Phil, then hides in the closet when Jack arrives to talk about renewing his contract. When Jack opens the closet door, he finds Silvers, Paar, King, and Moore; they're all after his job!
153	2	"Waukegan Show"	October 22, 1961
This episode was recorded in Jack's hometown of Waukegan, Illinois during a recent celebration of its famous former citizen. Don Wilson shows the construction of the brand new Jack Benny Junior High School; Dennis Day's not impressed, because there are "day schools" everywhere. The mayor of Waukegan presents Jack Benny items to be sealed into the school's cornerstone, including his first toy — a cash register — and a broken baton from his first violin lesson. A captain from the Great Lakes Naval Training Station reads highlights of Jack's Navy career, discovers Benny was never discharged, and has him hauled away to complete his duty.
154	3	"Jack on Trial for Murder"	November 5, 1961
Special guest: Raymond Burr. Jack receives a summons because his rooster is bothering the neighbors. Jack consults a lawyer — Frank Nelson — who learned law by watching Perry Mason. He advises that Jack plead insanity. Later, Jack dreams that he's on trial for murdering the rooster, and his lawyer is Perry Mason (Raymond Burr). Perry does a lousy job, and says that it's because Jack's writers aren't as good as his.
155	4	"Jack Takes the Stewarts to a Play"	November 12, 1961
Special guests: James Stewart and Gloria Stewart. Don and his wife cancel plans to join Jack and his girlfriend (Sandra Gould) for a play. Not about to waste tickets, Jack calls his old friends Jimmy and Gloria Stewart to ask if they'd like to go; mistaking Jack Benny for Jack Lemmon, they're delighted to attend. When Benny's free passes turn out to be invalid on weekends, the Stewarts plan to ditch Jack by claiming they need to buy a lamp. Jack takes them to a sleazy auction which features a striptease, an elephant leg stool, an obnoxious auctioneer (Jesse White), and free doughnuts.
156	5	"Tennessee Ernie Ford Show"	November 19, 1961
Special guest: Tennessee Ernie Ford. No one bothered to tell Jack that his guest, Tennessee Ernie Ford, would be appearing via live remote from his farm in Lakeport, California. The two chat about farming and Ernie sings "John Henry" at his barn before the picture goes black. When the picture comes back, it's an attractive woman; Ernie says it's one of his "pea pickers". Ford also displays the square egg he's developed. The technology goes haywire when they attempt a split-screen fiddle duet of "Sweet Georgia Brown". Finally, things go berserk and Jack ends up in Ernie's barn and Ernie on Jack's studio stage. Don does the State Farm commercial with a man on a pogo stick.
157	6	"Jack Plays Golf"	November 26, 1961
Special guest: Eric Monti. No one at Hillcrest wants to play golf with Jack because he's such a cheat. Members, including Don, now golf at sunrise to avoid him. He manages to make up a foursome with golf pro Eric Monti and two unsuspecting out-of-towners. Jack talks them into a high-stakes wager: ten cents for the game. On the course, Jack cheats repeatedly, irritating the visitors to the point that they quit. Monti arranges to get an "important call" to get out of playing. When it's just Jack and the caddy, Jack hits a hole in one. He's delighted until he remembers that it's tradition to buy free drinks for everyone in the clubhouse.
158	7	"Jack Is Followed Home"	December 3, 1961
Special guest: Bobby Rydell. Guest star Bobby Rydell sings "Sitting on Top of the World", and "Toot Toot Tootsie Goodbye". After the show, Jack is followed home, and a rock is thrown through his window. The rock thrower turns out to be Dennis Day, who is mad at Jack because Bobby sang instead of Dennis. Jack decides to take the law into his own hands, when he punishes Dennis. A remake of episode Nº 52, "Jack Gives Johnny Carson Advice."
159	8	"Jack Goes to the Cafeteria"	December 10, 1961
Special guest: Jane Morgan. Taking the bus to the studio, Jack asks the man beside him to help him rehearse a scene from the show. The two attract unwanted attention playing an arguing husband and wife. While waiting for Jack to arrive, Jane Morgan sings "The Second Time Around". When he finally gets to work, Jack flirts with Jane and invites her to lunch at a cafeteria. After arguing with every employee working the food line, he and Jane rehearse the "arguing couple" sketch. The others in the cafeteria think they're actually fighting and begin to take sides. Soon, a full-fledged brawl breaks out.
160	9	"Jack Writes a Song"	December 17, 1961
Special guest: Dimitri Tiomkin. Jack has written a song entitled "When You Say 'I Beg Your Pardon', Then I'll Come Back to You", which is so bad that windows fly open whenever he sings it. He hopes to get film composer Dimitri Tiomkin to arrange the tune for him. Meanwhile, locksmiths are trying to open Jack's vault for him. When Jack starts playing the song on his violin, the locksmiths start blasting, the windows fly open, plaster starts falling, and Dimitri makes a dash for the door. This is the beginning of a recurring gag on the show, as Jack tries to get other musicians to put his song to music in later episodes.
161	10	"Christmas Party"	December 24, 1961
To prove he's not a cheapskate, Jack throws a Christmas party for his cast and crew, and even hands out surprise gifts. Frank Nelson, suspicious of Jack's sudden generosity, uncovers the secret behind it. In the finale, Jack welcomes Mel Blanc, making his first appearance since his near-fatal car accident the previous January. He exchanges a few quips with Jack and does some of the voices he's performed on the show, including Sy and Professor LeBlanc.
162	11	"New Year's Eve"	December 31, 1961
This is a remake of episode Nº 24, "Reminiscing About Last New Year's." In this edition, Dennis sings the State Farm jingle as a middle commercial, with Don accompanying him on tuba.
163	12	"Jack Does Opera"	January 7, 1962
Special guest: Roberta Peters. Jack's guest is Metropolitan Opera star Roberta Peters, who sings "Shadow Song" from Dinorah. At home after the show, Rochester makes a fried egg sandwich for Jack without leaving the living room, using an extendable hand. Jack listens to a record Roberta gave him and dreams he's singing in La Traviata with her.
164	13	"Dennis Day's Surprise Birthday Party"	January 14, 1962
Hiding in one of Benny's closets, Dennis overhears Jack's plans to throw a surprise costume birthday party for him. It's obvious it's not a secret when Dennis arrives at the party dressed as a leprechaun. Dennis' protective mother gives Jack the usual earful. Don's middle commercial consists of impressions he performed at a recent State Farm convention.
165	14	"Jack Gets a Passport"	January 21, 1962
In the monologue, Jack claims the musicians' union has given him a one-way ticket to Australia to play violin concerts there. Dennis sings "Make Someone Happy". Don enters with the messenger delivering Jack's passport. Jack recalls the trouble he had years earlier trying to get a permit to work in London; he was caught in endless red tape, and his attempts at humor with the British bureaucrats only garnered blank stares.
166	15	"How Jack Met Rochester"	January 28, 1962
This is a remake of episode Nº 57, also titled "How Jack Met Rochester."
167	16	"Police Station Show"	February 4, 1962
This is a remake of episode Nº 68, "Jack's Maxwell Is Stolen."
168	17	"Ghost Town Western"	February 11, 1962
Special guest: Gisele MacKenzie. Jack and Gisele take a shortcut while driving from Phoenix to L.A., get lost, and stop in a diner in a ghost town for directions. The cafe owner tells them a story about bad guy Tombstone Harry (Gerald Mohr) and Cactus Kid (Benny), who have a gunfight over saloon singer Tess. Gisele sings "Buttons and Bows" for the cowboys. The Cactus Kid, unfortunately, can't shoot straight. A partial remake of episode Nº 12, "Buck Benny Rides Again."
169	18	"Rock Hudson Show"	February 18, 1962
Special guests: Rock Hudson and Hugh Downs. Benny's monologue is interrupted by the audience with their chants of "We want Rock!" Hudson and Benny compare the effects of their kisses on a blindfolded young lady. In the sketch, Jack does an impressive impression of Jack Paar in a takeoff of The Tonight Show. Paar's actual announcer/sidekick Hugh Downs appears as himself (he also manages to upstage Don during his Lipton Tea middle commercial). Dennis impersonates Paar's orchestra leader José Melis. Benny/Paar brings out his first guest, young harmonica-playing, Twist-teaching dance instructor Irving Hudson. Jack suggests he change his name to Rock: Irving Rock. The sketch ends with everyone learning "The Twist" from Hudson.
170	19	"Julie London Show"	March 4, 1962
Special guests: Julie London and Toni Marcus. Supposedly in response to many fan letters, Jack intends to play a complete song on his violin ("Czardas"). He starts the tune, only to be interrupted by a 12-year-old girl, Toni Marcus, who wants his autograph. As Jack signs her book, she grabs the violin and beautifully plays the song he was massacring. Julie London performs "Daddy", then chats and flirts shamelessly with Jack. She serenades him with "You're Sweet That Way" as he melts like butter. As Jack attempts to perform "Meditation", the young girl returns and wants to perform "Getting to Know You" like Jack had famously done with Gisele MacKenzie; the two close the show with a violin duet of the number.
171	20	"Alexander Hamilton Show"	March 11, 1962
The cast has gathered at Jack's house to read through the show's script, but the mimeograph office has mistakenly sent them the script for The Lone Ranger. Later, Jack falls asleep while reading a history book and dreams that he's Alexander Hamilton. "Alex" has happy feet; every time he hears a minuet from Dolley Madison's party across the street, he breaks into dance with whoever's around. Benjamin Franklin (Don Wilson) drops by because his kite's stuck on the roof, as does Aaron Burr (Dennis Day), who challenges Hamilton to a duel. Burr's first shot sends Hamilton's powdered wig flying into the air. However, as history must be truthful, Hamilton is fatally shot. As he dies, he takes comfort in the fact that when the $10 bill is eventually printed, Burr's picture won't be on it!
172	21	"Shari Lewis Show"	March 18, 1962
Special guest: Shari Lewis. Jack is in his office getting a haircut from Rochester when his director informs him that there are too many acts booked on his annual variety show; there's simply no room for Shari Lewis on the program. Shari and Lamb Chop arrive and Jack finds her so charming that he can't bring himself to bump her. Jack is amazed when the choreographer (Glenn Turnbull) comes in looking for a piano player and Shari volunteers. He's amazed by her versatility when she also sings ("I Want to be a Song and Dance Man"), dances, and does magic tricks. Seeing a way to save on his show, Jack hires Lewis and cancels all the other acts. Sheri and Jack perform "Alabamy Bound" on piano and violin.
173	22	"Crazy Airport"	March 25, 1962
Dennis takes over the show because Jack hasn't arrived at the studio. He's running late because of his penny-pinching; he flew in on a cut-rate airline that lands its planes in a pasture instead of at an airport. Jack has nothing but trouble with the nutty pilot, a baggage handler and a farmer.
174	23	"Jack Goes Back Into Pictures"	April 1, 1962
Special guest: Billy Wilder. Dennis Day performs "Everything's Coming Up Roses". Rochester unsuccessfully tries to calm down his exuberant boss. Jack is giddy because he thinks director Billy Wilder wants him to star in his next picture.
175	24	"Jack Is a Violin Teacher"	April 8, 1962
Dennis Day performs "On the First Warm Day". During a magazine interview about his life, Jack imagines about what would have happened had he never left Waukegan and become a comedian: as a struggling violin teacher in his hometown, he fails to impress his students, all of whom play better than he does. Even offering "bargain rates" on lessons fails to attract much business. With his furniture being repossessed, his shrill wife (Elvia Allman) is threatening to leave him.
176	25	"Modern Prison Sketch"	April 15, 1962
Special guest: Mickey Rooney. Mickey Rooney is the guest because Jack gave him tickets to the show and then tricks him into performing. The sketch is a remake of the one from episode Nº 105, "Ernie Kovacs Show."
177	26	"Jack Takes in a Boarder"	April 22, 1962
Special guest: Cousin Emmy. Jack advertises for a boarder and gets a non-stop parade of oddballs. Hillbilly entertainer Cousin Emmy and her kinfolk show up and play with Don on the State Farm commercial. Frank Nelson causes Jack headaches as a representative of the telephone company.
