= The Jack Benny Program season 13 =

The Jack Benny Program
- Season 13
- No. of episodes: 28

Release
- Original network: CBS
- Original release: September 25, 1962 – April 9, 1963

Season chronology
- ← Previous; Season 12 Next → Season 14

This is a list of episodes for the thirteenth season (1962–63) of the television version of The Jack Benny Program.

== Episodes ==
No. overall	No. in season	Title	Original release date
178	1	"Sammy Davis, Jr. Show"	September 25, 1962
Special guest: Sammy Davis, Jr. Jack opens his 13th season on television with this move to Tuesday nights, marking the first time in 28 years his program hasn't aired on a Sunday. Jack devotes his efforts to making sure the word gets out. His regulars Don Wilson, Dennis Day, and Rochester are on hand, and his "surprise guest" is Sammy Davis, Jr.
179	2	"Frank Sinatra, Jr. Show"	October 2, 1962
Special guest: Frank Sinatra, Jr. Jack's guest, Frank Sinatra, Jr., makes his national TV debut and sings "My Kind of Girl." Don brings out his son Harlow to proudly announce it's the boy's 19th birthday; Jack and Harlow snipe at each other while Don does the Jell-O commercial. After seeing Don with his son, and Frank Jr. performing, Jack imagines what it would be like if he had a boy: Playing his own imaginary son, Jack Benny Jr., he appears with Harlow and Frank Jr. as typical teenagers in a wild spoof of the "Twist" dance craze. The group performs the rock & roll tune "She Has a Wig, Contact Lenses, and a Nose Job."
180	3	"Phil Silvers Show"	October 9, 1962
Special guest: Phil Silvers. While Jack is getting a haircut in his dressing room, Silvers swipes Jack's pants and opens the show, going through Jack's pants pockets on stage. Jack finally makes it out wearing Don's huge pants. (This gag was originally done with Bob Hope in episode Nº 31, "Road to Nairobi.") In the sketch, Jack recalls when he first met Phil: Silvers shows up at Jack's house with a note pinned on him from Jack's Aunt Sudie, asking Jack to help the young man get a break in show business. Phil proceeds to mooch off Jack, play the clarinet at 4 a.m., and sell Jack's violin for poker money. When Aunt Sudie comes by and doesn't recognize Silvers, Jack tosses the freeloader out.
181	4	"Air Force Sketch"	October 16, 1962
Special guest: Raymond Burr. Guest Raymond Burr confesses his desire to become a comedian and demonstrates his new zany baggy-pants routine for Jack. Benny tells him that almost any drama can be turned into a comedy with a few changes, and he demonstrates by reworking a dramatic scene from one of Burr's old movies.
182	5	"Lawrence Welk Show"	October 23, 1962
Special guest: Lawrence Welk. The show opens with Lawrence Welk and his orchestra performing "Row, Row, Row." In their chat, Jack says that conducting is just a "racket" and that anyone can do it. To prove his point, Benny tries out the baton, and the music is a cacophony of noise. Jack confesses that his real reason for having Lawrence on is to get his band to play the sappy song Jack composed: "When You Say I Beg Your Pardon, Then I'll Come Back to You." Jack throws out a violinist and joins the orchestra for their rendition of his tune. Welk thinks it's lousy, so to save the song he turns it into a polka. Couples come onstage to dance, including the President and Secretary of Jack's Pasadena Fan Club.
183	6	"My Gang Comedy"	October 30, 1962
Special guest: Darla Hood. Jack welcomes his guest Darla Hood, best known from the Our Gang / Little Rascals comedies. She sings "It's a Most Unusual Day" and tells Jack that his cast reminds her of her old co-stars. The sketch is a takeoff on her old films with "youngster" Jack as Alfie, Rochester as Oatmeal, Dennis as rich kid Rodney, Don as Spunky, and Darla as herself. Rodney says he's entering Fifi in a dog show, so Alfie naturally wants to enter their mascot, Spot. Since the contest is only for French poodles, Alfie decides to glue the fur from his mother's new coat onto their dog.
184	7	"Jack Plays Tarzan"	November 13, 1962
Special guest: Carol Burnett. Jack scraps his usual monologue, he claims, to get his money's worth out of expensive guest Carol Burnett. He chats with Carol who, in a running joke, does a "bump and grind" dance whenever "The Stripper" is played. Burnett sings "The Trolley Song." The two discuss a jungle film they both saw, which leads into a Tarzan spoof. Carol plays Jane, Harlow is their son, and Jack is the ape man, dressed in leopard skin and phony muscles. After 20 years of marriage, Jane is fed up with jungle housekeeping and her shy husband who always jumps when she does her "Tarzan yell." Tarzan gets even by playing his violin which drives the jungle animals insane.
185	8	"Jack Gives a Dinner Party"	November 20, 1962
Special guests: James Stewart and Gloria Stewart. Famous cheapskate Jack throws a lavish, black-tie party at his home, complete with hors d'oeuvres and fine dining. This has his guests confused, including Jimmy and Gloria Stewart, who remember one party when bobbing for apples was the meal. They can't figure out what Jack is up to. Finally, one of the waiters lets the secret slip. Jimmy sings and plays "My Blue Heaven" on piano.
186	9	"Jack Meets a Japanese Agent"	November 27, 1962
Special guest: Jack Soo and Romi Yamada. Romi Yamada and Jack Soo from Flower Drum Song are the guests. Romi performs a song in Japanese and Jack wants to book her for more appearances — at a very cheap price. Her agent begs to differ. Jack Soo hosts a Japanese version of The Ed Sullivan Show. Guests include The Rocky Fellers playing "Long Tall Sally" with vocalist Jack in a wig and gold lamé suit. Mel Blanc is the mike-boom operator who can't stay awake.
187	10	"Jack and Bob Hope in Vaudeville"	December 4, 1962
Special guest: Bob Hope. This is a remake of episode Nº 75, "Hope and Benny in Agent's Office."
188	11	"Jack Referees a Wrestling Match"	December 11, 1962
Special guests: Mrs. Milton Berle, Mrs. Groucho Marx, Mrs. Kirk Douglas, Mrs. Phil Silvers, Billy Varga, and Gene LeBell. A charity event is being planned by the wives of several Hollywood stars, and Jack is disappointed because he hasn't been asked to participate. When he drops by Milton Berle's house, the ladies hide all evidence because they don't want him playing his lousy violin in their show. Refusing to take "No" for an answer, Benny jumps at the chance to replace the canceling Burt Lancaster -- as a wrestling referee. Knowing nothing about the sport, Jack takes a beating when he's caught between burly wrestlers Count Billy Varga and Gene Le Bell. After they've tossed him out of the ring, he gets angry.
189	12	"Jack and the Crying Cab Driver"	December 18, 1962
Jack encounters nothing but headaches trying to make a flight to New York. He catches a taxi from his home and contends with an emotional cabbie (Louis Nye), who cries uncontrollably because he always hates saying goodbye at the airport. Once inside, he encounters the Mexican Sy (the one with a sister named Sue who sews), a painter who can't spell the sponsor's name correctly, outrageous announcements on the P.A. system, and the always-sarcastic Frank Nelson behind a counter. This is a remake of episode Nº 46, "Preparing for New York Trip."
190	13	"The Story of the New Talent Show"	December 25, 1962
Jack conducts another of his new talent shows. Mel Blanc appears as Frenchman Franque Finque who does animal impressions. Don Wilson does his impression of Ted Lewis by performing "Me and My Shadow" with his son Harlow. The Renaldi Brothers, one a sharpshooter and the other who claims to be the fastest man in the world, do their amazing act; the "fastest man" dodges three bullets fired by his brother -- before being killed by the last five. Also performing are the Sentimental Sweethearts, an orchestra made up of the little old ladies of the Jack Benny Fan Club, Pasadena chapter.
191	14	"Jack Attends the Rose Bowl"	January 1, 1963
When inviting his sponsors to his New Year's Eve party, Jack recalls the year he invited his gal friend, Zelda, to attend the party. The next day, cheapskate Jack takes her to the Rose Bowl Game and watches every penny he spends. This insures problems with the hot dog vendor and the man at the ticket booth.
192	15	"Jack Meets Max Bygraves"	January 8, 1963
Special guest: Max Bygraves. Jack introduces his guest, British comedian/singer Max Bygraves. The pair chat and Bygraves performs a monologue. In the sketch, Jack recalls his first contact with the comic eight years earlier. Jack was in the audience of a British TV show in which Bygraves was performing, and was stunned by what he saw: Max had stolen his entire act. The comic lied about his age and claimed to be a cheapskate. He had a fat announcer named Don Wilton, a singer named Dennis Knight, and a valet named Manchester. Richard Dawson appears as an annoyed Englishman sitting next to Jack in the audience.
193	16	"Twilight Zone Sketch"	January 15, 1963
Special guest: Rod Serling. Jack hires Rod Serling to work with his two writers to improve the quality of the show. However, after being thrown out of their office, and finally disgusted by their methods, Rod decides he can't write comedy since it doesn't make any sense to him; Jack argues that "Twilight Zone does?" This leads to a sketch where Jack wanders through the fog until he sees the signpost up ahead informing him he's in the Twilight Zone, Population: Unlimited. Jack spots his house and goes in, but Rochester doesn't recognize him. Neither does the home's owner and town's mayor, (Serling) Mr. Twilight Zone ("You can call me Twi"), who thinks he's nuts. He calls over a psychologist, Dennis (who sings basso!!), who also refuses to believe he's some TV star named Jack Benny. At the end, Rod admits, "This is his house, he belongs here. Anybody who claims to be 39 years old as long as he has is a permanent resident of The Twilight Zone!". For the middle commercial, Dennis sings Vesti la giubba with lyrics referring to State Farm Insurance.
194	17	"Peter Lorre / Joanie Sommers Show"	January 22, 1963
Special guests: Peter Lorre and Joanie Sommers. Jack introduces creepy and villainous Peter Lorre. Lorre claims he's nothing like his movie image, all the while waving a switchblade around. To prove he's adorable, he sings, "I Want a Girl, Just Like the Girl, Who Murdered Dear Old Dad." Joanie Sommers follows with "I'll Never Stop Loving You." Jack says he's been so nervous with Lorre around, he's had nightmares. In his dream, Jack is in a doctor's office when escaped murderer Lorre comes in and demands the doc give him a new face. When the bandages are unwrapped, he looks like Jack! (It's Benny with padding and Lorre's voice dubbed in.) He shoots Jack, planning to take over his identity. The fake "Jack" walks on stage, gets no laughs, and proceeds to shoot crew members and Don Wilson ("You die LOUSY!", he sneers). Just before Jack describes his dream, Don introduces him to "Mr. E.B. Jello" (Dave Willock), who flew all the way from Manchester, New Hampshire to promote the sponsor's product- for less than altruistic reasons.
195	18	"The Murder of Clayton Worthington"	January 29, 1963
Special guests: Dick Van Dyke. Jack introduces Dick Van Dyke, who asks for Jack's help in a song and dance routine. After Van Dyke performs a huge song and dance routine ("Any Place I Hang My Hat Is Home"), all he needs is for Jack to wave his hand. Jack asks Van Dyke to appear in a sketch in the show. Van Dyke admits to being reluctant to agree, having heard from other actors how hard Jack makes his guests work. Jack promises that the part is very small and will be over in no time. In the sketch Jack plays a British Inspector trying to solve a murder mystery, but Van Dyke ends up playing every other character in the scene (rushing offstage and quickly changing outfits). Jack apprehends the culprit, and we end with seeing that Van Dyke also played the victim.
196	19	"Jack Rents His House"	February 5, 1963
Jack's is discussing his shows in New York and Toronto when the Larsons interrupt to get a picture with Jack. They keep inviting relatives to be in the shot until Jack is stuck behind the camera for a family photo. As Jack and Rochester pack for the trip, Don and Lois interrupt with a domestic tiff over Jell-O. The president and VP of Jack's Pasadena fan club bring a going-away gift: long underwear autographed by the members. Then, travel agent Frank Nelson brings the airline tickets. The Bensons, who are renting Jack's house, almost back out because Jack's had the gas and water turned off and electricity only after dark. A swarm of their relatives barge in -- it's the Larson family from the monologue.
197	20	"Spanish Sketch"	February 12, 1963
Special guest: Rita Moreno. Jack welcomes brand new Oscar winner Rita Moreno and tells her West Side Story has too much singing. She performs "Hard Hearted Hannah". In the sketch, a hot-blooded young woman (Rita), daughter of a cafe owner (Don), is ready to dump her toreador fiance (Dennis) the second she eyes the world's greatest Flamenco dancer, Jose Zecco (Jack). There is much Latin dancing, including a tango between Moreno and Jack, who looks like a bored Rudolph Valentino. Mel Blanc and Jack re-stage their famous "Si/Sy/Sue" routine.
198	21	"Connie Francis Show"	February 19, 1963
Special guest: Connie Francis. Jack has some fun with a radio sound effects man, and talks about a jaywalking ticket. Connie Francis sings "Follow the Boys." Don delivers a Jell-O commercial by claiming he's not going to mention it at all. Sure enough, whenever he gets to the word "Jell-O", he takes out a slide whistle and uses it. In the sketch, Stephen Foster is a lousy hack songwriter, starving in a small cabin. His wife, Connie, pines for her old folks at home who live way down along the Suwanee River near the Camptown racetrack. A neighbor, Susanna, offers sympathy but is told "Don't you cry for me." Meanwhile, Jack is wasting time improvising a song that begins "apples are red" and tells them to shut up while he is concentrating. She gets an idea on how to inspire him when the butcher comes by to collect on an unpaid bill. It involves a shotgun.
199	22	"Jack Does the U.S.O. Show"	February 26, 1963
Special guest: Martha Tilton. Vocalist Martha Tilton reminisces with Jack about the U.S.O. shows they performed together during World War II. This leads to the flashback of one of their wartime performances: Benny does a monologue full of military jokes and Tilton sings "Too Marvelous for Words" and "I'll Remember April." Benny is determined that nothing will keep him from playing his violin for the troops. The soldiers walking out and the enemy attacking do not deter Benny from finishing his number.
200	23	"Frankie Avalon Show"	March 5, 1963
Special guest: Frankie Avalon. In his monologue, Jack breaks his glasses in half to please both the people who thinks he looks best with his glasses and those who think without. He introduces Frankie Avalon who sings "Never Say Never Again." In a flashback to a few weeks earlier, Jack runs into Frankie at the studio and tries to get him to come of the show for free. Meanwhile, Don delivers a middle Jell-O commercial with a crying little girl (Marlene DeLamater) who isn't really what she appears to be. Jack goes to watch Frankie record "Embraceable You" and ruins take after take making various noises. The irritated producer is ready to throw Jack out until Benny accidentally comes up with their song "gimmick." The two duet on Jack's show: Frankie sings while Jack "plays" the water cooler.
201	24	"Jack Is Kidnapped"	March 12, 1963
Special guest: George Burns. Jack is kidnapped when he attempts to help an attractive woman (Merry Anders) feigning car trouble outside of his house. The woman and two thugs hold him for a $10,000 ransom. When his phone calls to a confused Don and sleepy Dennis fail to raise the money, the kidnappers take Jack to the bank to make a withdrawal. The bank employees are in shock, having never seen Jack Benny take money out of a bank before. He sees George Burns come in and, desperate for his help, begins singing "I Need Your Help"; Burns just thinks Benny's crooning a lousy song. Back at the kidnapper's hideout, they're planning to knock off their abductee since he can identify them to authorities. Police arrive in the nick of time to save Jack. However, because of Jack's large withdrawal, the bank's depositors panicked and withdrew their money...now, it's a produce market!
202	25	"Jack Fires Don"	March 19, 1963
After Jack and Don argue over who said "Don't give up the ship," Jack fires Don and holds auditions for a new announcer. Dennis does the Jell-O commercial as a series of imitations, including James Cagney and John F. Kennedy. Dennis rehearses a sentimental song for Jack, while Don walks back and forth across the set clearing out his office.
203	26	"The Mikado"	March 26, 1963
Jack talks about raising the standards of television programming, so he's staging a condensed version of the opera The Mikado. Rather than singing the Japanese love song that's planned, Dennis is determined to do an Irish jig. Don has his son Harlow, who's been taking elocution lessons, do the State Farm commercial. In the sketch, Jack is the Lord High Executioner with Dennis as Nanki-Poo, disguised as a minstrel. The "classy" production falls apart when Dennis does his jig dance. Remake of Nº 70.
204	27	"A Dummy Replaces Jack"	April 2, 1963
Jack returns from Hong Kong and enters via a rickshaw pulled by Dennis. Day sings "I Left My Heart in San Francisco." The main sketch is a remake of the one in episode Nº 125, "Final Show of the Season."
205	28	"Jack Answers Request Letters"	April 9, 1963
The premise for this episode is to have Jack answer viewers' letters. One asks about the sound effects on his old radio program, so Ray Erlenborn demonstrates how he made several of them. In the State Farm Insurance commercial, a serviceman from the audience (Dave Willock) claims State Farm insured his tank in the Battle of the Bulge. Jack's sister Florence asks why Dennis or Don never get to work without Jack, so the pair impersonate Laurel and Hardy in an original sketch. The final request is for Jack play a piece of music seriously; the last-minute accompanist (Ben Lessy) sent by Musicians' Union, however, completely upstages Jack with his antics.
