= The Jack Benny Program season 11 =

The Jack Benny Program
- Season 11
- No. of episodes: 26

Release
- Original network: CBS
- Original release: October 16, 1960 – April 16, 1961

Season chronology
- ← Previous; Season 10 Next → Season 12

This is a list of episodes for the eleventh season (1960–61) of the television version of The Jack Benny Program. This was the first season where the show ran every week.

== Episodes ==
| No. overall | No. in season | Title | Original release date |
|---|---|---|---|
| 126 | 1 | "Nightbeat Takeoff" | October 16, 1960 |
Special guests: George Burns, Robert Wagner, Tony Curtis, Mike Wallace and Johnny Green. To advertise the fact that The Jack Benny Program will now be shown weekly, Jack's publicity agent has hired trucks to run over people, leaving a tire imprint that reads, "Watch Jack Benny every week." At the country club, Jack overhears Burns, Wagner, and Curtis questioning if Benny has the stamina for a weekly show. The Sportsmen and Don Wilson perform a musical "campaign" commercial for Lipton Tea. Feeling tired, Jack goes home and takes a nap, during which he dreams that he's on Night Beat being questioned by Wallace about his decision to go weekly.
| 127 | 2 | "Dick Clark Show" | October 23, 1960 |
Special guests: Dick Clark, Susan Silo, Bobby Darin, Lorraine Wilson, and the Mills Brothers. Jack asks Dick Clark how he can get more teenagers to watch his show, and Dick suggests he hire a rock band like the Sabres (who proceed to perform "Flip, Flop and Fly"). Not wanting to pay the Sabres' $5,000 fee, Jack decides to form his own band; he, Don, and Dennis dress up as the Sabres and sing the same song on the show.
| 128 | 3 | "Milton Berle Show" | October 30, 1960 |
Special guest: Milton Berle. Jack and Milton Berle meet in a restaurant and discuss comedy. Now that Benny is on every week, Berle offers his idea of what it takes to sustain a weekly series (at the time, he was the host of Jackpot Bowling on NBC). In no time, he has remade Jack into his own image. They do a show together with Milton as the straight man and Jack, in a clown suit, delivering corny jokes and getting a pie in the face. The Sportsmen Quartet sing the middle Lipton Tea commercial to the tune of "The Blue Danube".
| 129 | 4 | "Hong Kong Suit" | November 6, 1960 |
Special guest: Gisele MacKenzie. Jack goes to Andre's Barber Shop, but no barber, manicurist, or shoe shine man wants to work on him; they all grouse about how he's stiffed them on tips in the past. On stage, Jack brags about the suit he's wearing; it only cost $12 in Hong Kong. He introduces Gisele, who plays piano and sings "Smile." Later, the violins come out and they duet on "Fascination / Puttin' on the Ritz." As they perform a classical number, Jack's cheap suit begins to fall apart. In the middle commercial, Don tries to get a seal to play the State Farm Insurance jingle on three horns. When "Oscar" won't do it, Jack suggests Don do it instead ("Blubber is blubber!", he insists).
| 130 | 5 | "John Wayne Show" | November 20, 1960 |
Special guests: John Wayne, Jaye P. Morgan, Betty Furness and Frank Fontaine. This is a remake of episode Nº 84, "John Forsythe Show," with John Wayne taking Jaye P. Morgan to the restaurant.
| 131 | 6 | "Joey Bishop Show" | November 27, 1960 |
Special guests: Joey Bishop and Diana Trask. In a show taped in New York, guest vocalist Diana Trask performs. Don and Jack go to the Copacabana to catch Joey Bishop's nightclub routine. Jack is impressed and suggests to Joey that they should team up as an act. Bishop isn't interested; he doesn't "dig" Benny's comedy.
| 132 | 7 | "Lunch Counter Murder" | December 4, 1960 |
Special guest: Dan Duryea. This is a remake of episode Nº 42, "Jack's Lunch Counter."
| 133 | 8 | "Jack Goes to a Concert" | December 11, 1960 |
Special guests: James Stewart and Gloria Stewart. Jack takes his girlfriend Mildred to a black-tie violin recital, even though she would rather go see a boxing match. At the concert, Jack spies the Stewarts below and tries to get their attention by pelting them with peanuts; the Stewarts leave. Bored with the recital, Mildred listens to the fight on her transistor radio, which clears out the theater.
| 134 | 9 | "Jack Goes Christmas Shopping" | December 18, 1960 |
This is a remake of episode Nº 86, "Christmas Shopping Show."
| 135 | 10 | "Amateur Show" | December 25, 1960 |
Special guest: Nanette Fabray. Jack discusses his holiday: the band gave him a 5-carat ring, but the cops took it back; Rochester went out with the Mills Brothers; and Dennis gave him a mackerel on a fish hook. The first amateur act is a lousy musical group, the Tijuana Troubadors, with Mel Blanc. Mel and Jack do their "Sí/Sy/Sue" routine. In the Lipton Tea commercial, Don plays piano while his son Harlow sings "One of These Days" as Sophie Tucker. Jack runs Harlow off his stage. Using her married name, Nanette Fabray shows up with a violin case; she pulls out a saw and plays it as Jack accompanies her on "April Showers." At the close, Jack introduces Mel Blanc, and congratulates Nanette on her new series, and Harlow on his Sophie Tucker impression; Harlow says he was doing Nelson Eddy.
| 136 | 11 | "Jack Casting for Television Special" | January 1, 1961 |
This is a remake of episode Nº 36, "The Life of Jack Benny".
| 137 | 12 | "Jack Goes to the Vault" | January 8, 1961 |
During his monologue, Jack gets a phone call from two Treasury agents who want to meet him at his home in an hour. Jack's sure he's about to be charged with tax evasion, so he leaves the show to Don and races home. The agents are actually from Fort Knox and they've come to study his legendary vault. Jack leads the government men on the dangerous path underground where they encounter his man-eating plant, Edwin. Still watching the vault is the long-suffering guard who tells Jack that he's never seen smog, but hopes President Washington will do something about it.
| 138 | 13 | "Don's 27th Anniversary with Jack" | January 15, 1961 |
Special guests: Roy Rowan, Bill Baldwin and John Charles Daly. Jack salutes Don Wilson over his 27th anniversary of working with him, and he gives Don a crown, a cape, and a throne (which collapses under Don's weight); the Sportsmen Quartet serenade Don with a special rendition of "Down Yonder". In flashbacks, Jack remembers how Don came to work for him: Jack's radio sponsor, the Universal Corset Co., holds auditions for an announcer for Jack's program. Don is awful — he's only there to complain about a corset he bought — but he's the only one who laughs at Jack's stale jokes. Jack sends Don to elocution lessons and a dance school where he becomes a ballerina. John Daly presents Don with a plaque for his achievements in broadcasting and congratulates him on saving the Benny show when it was "down." Don agrees that the show was a flop without him. An insulted Jack breaks the plaque over Don's head.
| 139 | 14 | "Jack at the Supermarket" | January 22, 1961 |
This is mostly a remake of episode Nº 37, "Shopping Show", complete with the crooked card game. In one memorable gag, a woman is handing out free samples of cake; when she leaves the table unattended, Jack takes all the cake, the plates, the knife and the tablecloth.
| 140 | 15 | "Jack Is Hypnotized" | January 29, 1961 |
Jack and his secretary, Miss Gordon, go to a nightclub to see the Sportsmen Quartet, who sing "When My Sugar Walks Down the Street". He then scoffs at the next act, a performance of hypnotism by Professor Colini. The Professor soon makes Jack a believer when he convinces the old cheapskate that he's Diamond Jim Brady; Jack complies by tipping the waiter $50. Unhappy about his new spending tendency, Jack comes back to Professor Colini, who now makes him think he's Bob Hope.
| 141 | 16 | "Jack Goes to a Gym" | February 5, 1961 |
Special guest: Norman Alden. To impress an attractive receptionist at the studio, Jack decides he needs some muscles. He joins a gym and, to keep from paying full price for membership, he talks Don into joining with him. After getting a look at Jack's lousy physique and bird legs, the gym operators aren't sure they can do anything to help him. While Jack struggles hopelessly with the various weight devices, Don sits on a machine that beats his bottom while he munches on a big sandwich. Jack's ultimate solution: football shoulder pads under his jacket. Alan Hale, Jr. plays one of the gym instructors.
| 142 | 17 | "Death Row Sketch" | February 12, 1961 |
Special guest: Mamie Van Doren. Guest Mamie Van Doren charms Jack into letting her sing on the show; she and Dennis sing "You Make Me Feel So Young". Jack starts reading a book titled Life in the Death House, or My Last Meal Had No Appeal, leading to a dream where he's a condemned man telling his story to the warden. It seems he had a gorgeous wife (Mamie) who made him do all the housework and care for their idiot son (Dennis) while she lavished her attention on their boarder (Gerald Mohr).
| 143 | 18 | "Musicale" | February 19, 1961 |
Jack's monologue is about freeways. The sketch — which is a remake of the one from episode Nº 20, "Jack as a Child" — is a flashback to Jack's childhood: Young Jack (Barry Gordon) argues with his father (Jack) about money and about playing his violin in a string quartet.
| 144 | 19 | "Jack Becomes a Surgeon" | February 26, 1961 |
Jack and Rochester are cleaning Jack's attic, but Jack keeps finding excuses to keep everything. Rochester finds a box of papers that contains Jack's application to medical school. Rochester daydreams about what Jack would have been like as a surgeon: Dr. Von Struneheimer (Mel Blanc) comes from Vienna to watch the great Dr. Benny perform an appendectomy. After numerous mix-ups, the eminent surgeon gets to work, with disastrous results.
| 145 | 20 | "Detective Story" | March 5, 1961 |
Special guest: Frank Fontaine. Dennis Day sings "It's Almost Like Being In Love" and bothers Jack with his squeaky shoes. Jack then argues with Don over who's going to introduce the evening's sketch...but Don still manages to sneak in a Lipton Tea commercial. In the sketch, Jack plays a big city police detective with his assistants Don and Dennis. He's hot on the trail of a murderer, with a bizarre parade of suspects including John L. C. Sivoney (Fontaine), an old-time gangster, and a shoplifter with a bizarre taste in merchandise.
| 146 | 21 | "Children's Version of the Show" | March 12, 1961 |
Dennis and Don attend the play put on by the third grade class of Beverly Hills Elementary School. The kids perform their version of The Jack Benny Program. In the State Farm commercial, a man who has just had an accident comes to Jack's door and asks to use the phone. He then makes a long-distance call to their home office in Michigan.
| 147 | 22 | "Jack Goes to Las Vegas" | March 19, 1961 |
Special guests: The Mills Brothers. Cheapskate Jack hires only two of the Mills Brothers for his show. The other two come out, free of charge, and all four perform "Opus No. 1" and "(Up A) Lazy River". Jack tries to make a reservation in Las Vegas. The hotel clerk falsely tells him they're full because he remembers Jack's previous visit years earlier, which is shown in flashback: When Jack arrives at the hotel, Don tells him he cleaned up at the tables — the buffet tables. Benny balks at paying $28 a night, saying that $28 a week is too much. The hotel's manager agrees to rent him Room 13, underground, for $4 a night. Unable to resist temptation, Jack puts a nickel in a slot machine and wins the super jackpot. With his pockets full of nickels, he claims not to have any change for the bellhop.
| 148 | 23 | "Dance Contest" | March 26, 1961 |
Special guest: Al Jarvis. Rochester wants to compete in a TV dance contest, but Jack tells him he's already used his night off this month. However, Jack is excited by the $500 grand prize, so he cancels dinner with the Wilsons and enters with a woman he just met. After the contest, Jack shows up at the Wilsons' at 2 a.m. for dinner, then complains about the food.
| 149 | 24 | "Variety Show" | April 2, 1961 |
Special guests: Ann-Margret, Francis Brunn and George Burns. Jack introduces newcomer Ann-Margret, and George Burns comes out; since Jack saw her in Burns' Vegas show, George wants to introduce her. She performs "I Ain't Got Nobody". Burns demands a park setting for her next number, so Jack brings out a park bench he found complete with a couple on it necking. She sings "Have a Good Time". Jack dresses as Ben Franklin to settle a bet for George. Don Wilson does the Lipton Tea commercial with the couple from the park bench getting into an argument. Juggler Francis Brunn performs and Jack, in a tight outfit, tries to join the act. Things don't go well and Benny exits on a stretcher.
| 150 | 25 | "Main Street Shelter" | April 9, 1961 |
Jack waits for all the tardy channel switchers to tune in before he begins his monologue. In the sketch, Jack returns from a three-day hike with the Beverly Hills Beavers to find that Rochester has given an old sports jacket of his to the Main Street Shelter. Jack rushes down to retrieve it since it has $200 sewn in the lining. In his camping clothes, and with a three-day beard, he is taken for a transient himself. When he finally gets his coat and $200 back, his "alter ego" makes him donate the cash to the shelter.
| 151 | 26 | "English Sketch" | April 16, 1961 |
Special guests: Peter Lawford and Diana Dors. Jack's monologue is interrupted by two photographers from What's New in Television magazine, who want to take his picture. Benny talks with Lawford about being between pictures; for Jack, it's been a long, long wait. The sketch is a remake of the one in episode Nº 30, "David Niven Show", with Jack again playing Cecil Frothingham.
