= The Jack Benny Program season 9 =

The Jack Benny Program
- Season 9
- No. of episodes: 15

Release
- Original network: CBS
- Original release: September 21, 1958 – April 5, 1959

Season chronology
- ← Previous; Season 8 Next → Season 10

This is a list of episodes for the ninth season (1958–59) of the television version of The Jack Benny Program.

== Episodes ==
No. overall	No. in season	Title	Original release date
96	1	"Gary Cooper Show"	September 21, 1958
Special guest: Gary Cooper. Jack drops in on Gary Cooper at a rehearsal for a Western film, hoping to audition for the part of Gary's twin brother; he shows up in a ridiculous cowboy outfit with six-inch elevator shoes. Jack changes his mind when he learns that his character gets beaten up in a barroom brawl. In the epilogue, Jack introduces Gary's wife and daughter in the studio audience. Remade, with Clint Walker, as "Tall Cowboy Sketch" (Nº 208).
97	2	"Phil Harris Show"	October 5, 1958
Special guest: Phil Harris. Jack is reunited with the band leader from his radio show, Phil Harris, who leads the band while singing "That's What I Like About the South." Jack interrupts the song, demanding that Harris make sense of the goofy lyrics. Jack orders Phil not to sing the foolish tune, so Phil sings "Poker Club" instead. While Don was in Philadelphia preparing to appear in a Broadway play {"Make A Million"}, Jack featured "Elwood Hunsett" (Howard McNear) in the middle Lucky Strike commercial.
98	3	"The Millionaire"	October 19, 1958
Special guests: Marvin Miller and Jan & Arnie. Marvin Miller, as his character Michael Anthony from The Millionaire, goes to Dennis Day's house and gives him a check for one million dollars. After the monologue, Jack introduces Dennis, but rock 'n' roll duo Jan & Arnie come out and sing instead. Jack goes to Dennis' house and finds Dennis in a polo outfit, his mother expensively dressed, and Rochester working as his butler. Michael Anthony returns and takes back the check after discovering that "Dennis Day" is just a stage name. Jan & Arnie perform "The Beat That Can't Be Beat."
99	4	"Stars' Wives Show"	November 2, 1958
Special guests: Bob Hope, David Niven, Dolores Hope, and Jeanne Martin. Jack hires a painter (Mel Blanc) who likes to paint to music; when Jack learns that the painter charges 50¢ an hour, he puts on the fast side of an album. The Committee for the Improvement of Beverly Hills, a group made up of the wives of big stars, is meeting with the mayor; they want to get rid of Jack's "moving eyesore", i.e. his Maxwell car, and decide to hold a raffle. Bob Hope and David Niven appear in a cameo at the end.
100	5	"Bachelor TV Lives"	November 16, 1958
Special guest: George Burns. Jack is driving to New Orleans for a benefit concert, and George Burns wants to ride along and perform; George demonstrates his singing ability while Jack and Rochester pack. Benny's newspaper ad asking for riders gets a response from a pair of robbers who want to be picked up in front of a bank, and a bickering couple who fight over the front seat. Frank Nelson is the rude mechanic who brings Jack's car back from the garage. The Benny home erupts into chaos when another twenty people show up wanting to ride; all the while, Burns is still singing. In the epilogue, Jack parades the huge cast across the stage to the theme from The Bridge on the River Kwai.
101	6	"Jack Goes to the Doctor"	November 30, 1958
Special guest: Oscar Levant. Jack is so agitated and irritable that guest Oscar Levant suggests that Jack go see Oscar's psychiatrist. While they wait for the doctor to finish with another patient, Oscar pinpoints the cause of Jack's anxiety: Frank Nelson. Jack is so upset about running into Nelson wherever he goes that he hides under the carpet. Coincidentally, the doctor's patient has the same problem — except that it's Jack who's tormenting him.
102	7	"Jack and Gisele MacKenzie"	December 14, 1958
Special guests: Gisele MacKenzie and Red Skelton. In his monologue, Jack talks about what Christmas gifts to give members of his cast. He and Gisele discuss her recent trip to Europe and she sings the Italian song "Non Dimenticar." With Jack backstage, Don introduces his son Harlow to Gisele. She allows him do the commercial, which he constantly interrupts to make passes at her. Dennis Day plugs his new holiday album Christmas Is for the Family. Jack and Gisele do another violin duet, "Czardis." Gisele prepares to play a piano, when a "surprise guest" pops out of the instrument: Red Skelton.
103	8	"Christmas Gift Exchange"	December 28, 1958
Special guest: Chuck Callahan. High-strung department store clerk Herman (Mel Blanc) is trying to finish his inventory first to win tickets to the Rose Bowl. He's almost finished when in walks Jack, the man who drives him to insanity every holiday season. Jack, with his secretary Barbara, has come to return a sweater he didn't need. As usual, Jack is indecisive, repeatedly changing his mind about wanting a store credit or a check. Benny finishes Herman's inventory after having turned the poor man into a whimpering heap. Herman's in no shape for a football game, so Jack takes his tickets and leaves.
104	9	"Autolight"	January 11, 1959
Special guest: Barbara Stanwyck. Jack is sweeping the set; he explains that anything he saves he can keep. He has Mary running the spotlight and Bob Crosby building sets. During his monologue on his movie career, a girl cartwheels across the stage; Jack says he promised the girl's father he'd get her TV work. She turns up again during the later sketch. Bob Crosby sings "I Don't Care If the Sun Don't Shine."; The main sketch, a parody of the movie Gaslight, is a remake of the one in episode Nº 7, "Gaslight"; Stanwyck plays the wife who's being driven insane by Jack. Jack originally filmed this episode in June 1953 for the 1953-'54 season, but was unable to present it until he legally settled with MGM over the right to satirize Gaslight (they filed an injunction against him, claiming his parody was too close to the original version of their film).
105	10	"Ernie Kovacs Show"	January 25, 1959
Special guest: Ernie Kovacs. In his monologue, Jack makes jokes about finally being able to show the Gaslight sketch on his show. Ernie shows Jack his mustache collection, and has Jack tries some of them on; they all look ridiculous. Don delivers the middle commercial as a "beatnik" musical number, with members of Los Angeles' "Billy Barnes' Revue": Bert Convy, Len Weinrib, Patti Regan, and Ann Morgan Guilbert. The main sketch is in a cushy prison in the future year of 1970; inmates Killer Kovacs and Benny the Louse play golf and have the warden shine their clubs. Kovacs is about to be released, but he doesn't want to leave the prison's gourmet room service, hi-fi, and cha-cha lessons; the guards have to physically throw him out.
106	11	"Jack Goes to a Nightclub"	February 8, 1959
Special guest: Danny Thomas. Jack's nervous because it is contract renewal time, and the sponsor does not seem to like cut-rate talent Jack hired. Jack takes the sponsor representative to a nightclub, carefully picking one where the talent is no better than a puppet show so that Jack will not be outshone. However, they wind up at a club where Danny Thomas is performing, and Jack squirms while Danny's act goes over big with the sponsor rep.
107	12	"Airport Sketch"	February 22, 1959
Dennis takes over the show while Jack tries to get back to the studio; Jack is held up at the airport because he flew back on cut-rate "IOU Airlines." Dennis talks about the fringe benefits of working for Jack, sings "Let There Be Love", and joins Don for a dance routine. At the airport, Jack and Rochester try to find their lost luggage in the hangar, and Jack has disagreements with various clerks and the loopy pilot. At the end of the program, the pilot files across the stage on a camera boom.
108	13	"Panel Discussion Show"	March 8, 1959
Special guests: Vincent Price, Pamela Mason, and June Levant. Rochester washes pieces of Jack's Maxwell car in the house; it fell apart when he turned the hose on it. Jack thinks he'll look smart if he appears on a panel discussion program, but matching wits with panelists Vincent, Pamela, and June (wife of Oscar Levant) proves to be harder than he'd expected. When the topic turns to finances, however, they can't shut Jack up. Later remade, with Price, as "Jack Appears on a Panel Show" (Nº 258).
109	14	"Edgar Bergen Show"	March 22, 1959
Special guests: Edgar Bergen and Frances Bergen. This is a remake of episode Nº 54, "Frances and Edgar Bergen."
110	15	"Ed Sullivan / Genevieve Show"	April 5, 1959
Special guests: Ed Sullivan and Genevieve. Jack discusses being back in New York in his monologue. Genevieve sings a French song about Paris. The sketch is a courtroom drama with Jack playing the prosecutor and Ed as defense attorney Gentleman Jim Sullivan. Ed represents a beautiful French girl, Genevieve, accused of murdering her husband. Sullivan reverts to his usual self and picks out celebrities in the courtroom to stand for applause. Don Wilson is the courtroom commentator. Later remade as episode Nº 211, "Ed Sullivan Show."
