= The Jack Benny Program season 1 =

The Jack Benny Program
- Season 1
- No. of episodes: 4

Release
- Original network: CBS
- Original release: October 28, 1950 – May 20, 1951

Season chronology
- Next → Season 2

The first season of The Jack Benny Program consisted of four episodes, during 1950 and 1951. This premiere television season of The Jack Benny Program overlapped with his radio program of the same name, which would continue until 1955, whereas this television program would last until 1965.

Jack Benny was the show's host, creator and star. Because he was unwilling to commit to the still-new technology of television on a weekly basis, the first television season of The Jack Benny Program did not include any more than these four sporadically scheduled special episodes; each was broadcast live as was typical during the Golden Age of Television. It was not until season 5 that the program would settle into a regular biweekly time slot. The program was broadcast on CBS (until its final season), and the theme song is "Love in Bloom".

== Episodes ==
No. overall	No. in season	Title	Original release date
1	1	"Premiere Show"	October 28, 1950
Special guest: Dinah Shore. After The Sportsmen Quartet introduce Jack (to the tune of "There's No Business Like Show Business"), his monologue {"I'd give a million dollars to know how I look"} and sketch are about how he decided to make a TV show, and got Dinah Shore to appear on it (Ken Murray, whose program Jack pre-empted that evening, also makes a brief appearance). Mel Blanc appears as a technical director who interrupts Jack's monologue. After Dinah sings a few songs, Jack gets out his violin and starts playing, which causes the studio audience to get up and leave. Note: this was a 45-minute episode.
2	2	"Faye Emerson and Frank Sinatra Show"	January 28, 1951
Special guests: Faye Emerson, Frank Sinatra, and Frank Fontaine. Jack and Sinatra do a skit about New York City, and Sinatra sings "Take My Love." Later, Jack tries to show Faye that he can play romantic roles; he does a dramatic scene with her that's supposed to end in a kiss, but Sinatra walks in and steals the kiss for himself. Frank Fontaine appears as John L.T. Savonie, who in a running gag keeps repeating his endless Social Security number. This was the first half-hour episode in what became Jack's regular Sunday night time period.
3	3	"Claudette Colbert and Basil Rathbone Show"	April 1, 1951
Special guests: Claudette Colbert, Basil Rathbone, and Robert Montgomery. Jack wants a dramatic role on an episode of Robert Montgomery Presents, which is already set to star Colbert and Rathbone. After getting nowhere with the producer, Jack crashes a rehearsal at Colbert's apartment. He's given a small part just to be kept quiet, but he's such a disruptive pest that Rathbone calls him a "schlemiel" and storms out.
4	4	"Ben Hogan Show"	May 20, 1951
Special guest: Ben Hogan. Jack, Mary, and Rochester (as a caddy) go to play golf with Bob Crosby. Not recognizing golfing legend Ben Hogan, Jack starts giving Ben unsolicited advice on how to play the game. Later, Jack hits a ball into the woods; rather than lose it, he takes Rochester into the woods to search for it. They give up two days later.
