= 100 episodes =

Traditional threshold for a TV show to enter syndicated reruns

In the American television industry, 100 episodes is the traditional threshold for a television series to enter syndicated reruns. This episode count is advantageous for stripped syndication because it allows for 20 weeks of weekday reruns (depending on the number of episodes produced once the program debuts in syndication) without repeating an episode, and such shows can be sold for higher per-episode pricing.

One of the first series made specifically for syndication, the 1953–1955 sitcom Life with Elizabeth, purposely ended its run after only 65 episodes, concerned that producing more would saturate the market and reduce the syndication package's value. In recent years, the minimum number of episodes for off-network, stripped syndication has been set at 88 (typically four seasons of 22 episodes), although some programs have been relatively successful in syndication with fewer episodes. The Jetsons, for instance, only aired 75 episodes.

== Overview ==
The secret of a good series is that you must be able to see episodes thirty-five or forty-nine clearly before you begin.

— David Victor

Syndication is often a profitable enterprise because a series can be rerun for years after it ends production. Shows of limited profitability during their first run will still prove to be viable to the production company if they can last 100 episodes. This point is usually reached during a series' fifth season.

Examples of per-season number of episodes for some highly rated programs
Decade	Program	Episodes
1950s	I Love Lucy	31 (1952–53)
1950s	The Jack Benny Program	16 (1955–56)
1960s	The Beverly Hillbillies	36 (1963–64)
1960s	The Andy Griffith Show	30 (1966–67)
1970s	All in the Family	24 (1974–75)
1970s	Happy Days	26 (1978–79)
1980s	Dallas	30 (1983–84)
1980s	The Cosby Show	25 (1986–87)
1990s	Cheers	26 (1990–91)
1990s	Seinfeld	24 (1994–95)
2000s	CSI: Crime Scene Investigation	23 (2003–04)
2000s	The Mentalist	23 (2008–09)
2010s	Person of Interest	22–23 (2012–13)

Shows that have produced fewer episodes have become syndication successes, in some cases prompting additional episodes to be commissioned specifically for syndication to reach the 100-episode mark. WKRP in Cincinnati was a major success in syndication despite having only produced 90 episodes, eventually prompting 47 additional episodes to be produced a decade after the original ended. The Monkees, a show that lasted only 58 episodes and two seasons, went on to be rerun extensively in the decades that followed, with interest in the series being revived in the 1980s when the series was rerun on cable. The Honeymooners was a series spun off in 1955–1956 from sketches of the same name that aired on The Jackie Gleason Show, an hour-long variety program (1952–1955). While only 39 episodes of The Honeymooners were produced, there were enough Honeymooners sketches from The Jackie Gleason Show (which ran again in the 1956–1957 season and would be revived in the 1960s) to compile a syndication package with over 100 episodes. Mama's Family was put into syndication despite having only 35 episodes at the time of its cancellation; the surprise success of the show in summer reruns and syndication prompted the syndicator to rush the show back into production, which led to an additional 95 episodes aired over four seasons in first-run syndication. The Munsters also was put into syndication despite running for two seasons, but with 70 episodes; the series became popular in reruns to the point that an updated version of the series was produced in the late 1980s and early 1990s with an entirely new cast and 72 episodes over three seasons.

More recently, Clueless had reasonable success in syndication, especially on cable, even though only 62 episodes had been produced by the time the series ended in 1999. Chappelle's Show entered syndication despite only producing 33 episodes, five of which were clip shows. Series which have entered the public domain, such as Dusty's Trail, Meet Corliss Archer, and Life with Elizabeth are sometimes aired regardless of the number of episodes because there is no licensing fee.

Dramas, which do not require daily runs, have also had success in syndication with shorter runs. For example, Lost in Space ceased production in 1968 after 84 episodes because of declining ratings, but did well in syndication for a number of years. The original Star Trek series had only 79 episodes available when its network run ended in 1969, but after its considerable success in syndication, it spawned multiple feature films and more than six spin-off series. Other examples include The Prisoner and Hondo, both successfully syndicated for more than 30 years despite having only 17 episodes produced. The original 1978 series Battlestar Galactica and its spin-off Galactica 1980 produced a combined 34 episodes, yet it not only remains in syndication but it also led to a 2003 reimagining that lasted for 75 episodes. In 2014, AMC released The Walking Dead for reruns on MyNetworkTV after 51 episodes had aired; that series was still in production at the time, and MyNetworkTV airs its shows once a week instead of in a daily strip.

The growth of cable and satellite television has prompted channels to rerun series more often, with fewer episodes. Reruns of a particular show may air multiple times a day, several days a week, despite having only one or two seasons of episodes produced.

By the early 2010s, the milestone for syndication was accepted at 88 episodes, which is typically reached after four seasons. Shows approaching the 88-episode target are often renewed despite low ratings in order to ensure syndication. Production companies can offer discounts on licensing fees to the networks to encourage renewal. Shows that are approaching the 88-episode syndication milestone while suffering from poor ratings are often moved to graveyard slots on Friday or Saturday in order to burn off remaining episodes. By the end of that decade, with the rise of subscription video on demand services and different funding models which make continuing series more expensive, the threshold for a series to be profitable in syndication has been dropped even lower to 50 episodes. It was noted in 2024 that no American series that had been originally made for streaming television had ever reached the 100 episode threshold. Lucifer had 36 episodes produced for Netflix in order to be viable for syndication and basic cable after Fox had canceled the series after 57 episodes.

An extreme example of a show renewed primarily for syndication purposes was 'Til Death, which was pulled from Fox's lineup just seven episodes into its third season, after it had fallen out of the top 100 in the primetime ratings. Cancellation seemed imminent, but the show was renewed for a fourth season after Sony Pictures Entertainment offered Fox a discount on the licensing fee. Unaired episodes from the third season were broadcast alongside fourth season episodes from October 2009 through June 2010 (a total of 37 episodes), including four new episodes airing in a Christmas Day "marathon" and two new episodes being scheduled against Super Bowl XLIV with the knowledge that these episodes would have minuscule ratings. The overlapped seasons led to some comical confusion, because four different actresses played the part of Allison Stark during this span of episodes. The show eventually reached 81 episodes, and debuted in off-network syndication in the fall of 2011.

== Niche genres ==
The 100-episode threshold is generally applied solely to scripted prime time programming, since sitcoms and dramas are the most prevalent in syndicated reruns. Other programming may follow different patterns. For example, the traditional syndication model seldom works for most reality shows, and both annual and semi-annual contests have also been a relative failure in syndication.

=== Game shows ===
On rare occasions, game shows have been rerun on broadcast television. Despite having very high output as far as numbers of episodes (a typical 13-week run of even an unsuccessful game show yielded 65 episodes) are concerned, most networks instead opted to recycle the tapes of those shows, as it was viewed at the time as a more profitable practice than trying to sell reruns of daytime programming. The practice of rerunning some of the most popular game shows in syndication was rare, but not unheard of, in the 1970s and 1980s; Gambit was rerun in 1978 and Match Game was rerun in syndication in 1985. In addition, Classic Concentration was rerun by NBC between September 1991 and the summer of 1993. Jeopardy! and Wheel of Fortune, which have produced thousands of episodes over their runs of 35 or more years in syndication as of 2019, offers a package of reruns (with the former using the title Daytime Jeopardy!) as companion series for stations with an extra time slot.

With the advent of cable channels such as Game Show Network (GSN), the subchannel network Buzzr, and advertising-supported linear video services such as Pluto TV, rerunning game shows has become more common; for instance, Merv Griffin's Crosswords, which lasted one season and 225 episodes in syndication during the 2007-08 season, ran continuously for several years thereafter, originally in syndication and later on Retro TV. GSN has rerun several game shows that ran less than 100 episodes, including Greed (44 episodes), Dog Eat Dog (26 episodes), Power of 10 (18 episodes), and perhaps the most extreme case, Million Dollar Password, which ran for only 12 episodes. Even among shows with hundreds (and even thousands) of episodes, since the early 2010s, GSN typically has only acquired the rights to 50 to 65 episodes at a time for most series. Rerunning game shows has proven to be successful; Stirr, the free over-the-top service run by Sinclair Broadcast Group, stated that Buzzr was the service's most popular nationwide channel. Pluto TV and The Roku Channel have launched 24-hour linear channels devoted to individual game shows, a trend that began with The Price Is Right: The Barker Era in December 2020 and since expanded to other game shows. A dedicated channel generally requires more than 100 episodes for optimal rotation, since a series of that length will begin repeating within less than three days; Pluto's Jeopardy! channel, Jeopardy! Hosted by Alex Trebek, initially used a 250-episode package before expanding to 500 episodes in 2023.

=== Cartoons and children's programming ===
Rerunning children's programming generally requires fewer episodes than programming for adults. For most children's series, reruns are aired for a short period of time after the series finishes production, then are replaced. For weekly series, this practice dates to at least the 1960s, when Saturday-morning cartoons would, after the end of their 13-week run, begin rerunning continuously for the rest of the season (resulting in each episode getting four airings in a one-year cycle) until being replaced by the next show, either new or archival. During the 1970s, 22 episodes was typically the number a producer sought in order for an animated program to be rerun beyond its first year. After several years, once the previous generation of children outgrew the show, it could be reintroduced for the next younger generation by airing reruns. For shows that are rerun daily, the time span is usually on the order of months. This also meant that cancellations of children's programming were extremely rare; because of the long lead time to produce a cartoon, networks usually bought a full season of a show before it began airing, meaning that it would be far too late to have any appreciable financial benefit by ending it.

It was noted in a study that when the animated series Robotech aired in 1985, daily strip syndication for a series for children required 65 episodes at minimum. Until the mid-2000s, the Disney Channel notably stuck to a 65-episode limit—which allows for four series to be shown every weekday for a year—until That's So Raven was renewed to end at 100 episodes.
