= The Jack Benny Program season 8 =

The Jack Benny Program
- Season 8
- No. of episodes: 16

Release
- Original network: CBS
- Original release: September 22, 1957 – April 20, 1958

Season chronology
- ← Previous; Season 7 Next → Season 9

This is a list of episodes for the eighth season (1957–58) of the television version of The Jack Benny Program.

== Episodes ==
No. overall	No. in season	Title	Original release date
80	1	"First Show of the Season"	September 22, 1957
After Jack's monologue, Dennis sings "Around the World in 80 Days." Don starts to do the commercial, but Jack tells him that he doesn't want the show to have a middle commercial this week. Instead, Mel Blanc plays music on bottles filled with alcohol, and gets progressively drunk as he tunes them. Later, Don's wife forces Jack to explain to the sponsor that cutting the commercial wasn't Don's idea.
81	2	"The Airport"	October 6, 1957
Special guest: Robert Culp. Jack's trying to catch a flight to New York so he can be on The $64,000 Question, but at the airport he has the usual troubles: the loopy PA announcer, a racetrack tout with advice on chewing gum, an encounter with Sy (Mel Blanc), and Frank Nelson as a clerk who wants to sell Jack a one-way ticket out of town. Culp appears to promote his new Western series (sponsored by Luckies), Trackdown. Jack did appear as a "gag contestant" on The $64,000 Question on October 8th; after answering the first question, he insisted on taking his winnings ($64) and leaving the program. This is referred to in the next episode.
82	3	"Hal March Show"	October 20, 1957
Special guest: Hal March. The president and secretary of the Jack Benny Fan Club, Pasadena Chapter, interrupt the monologue to get better seats, and pull on Jack's hair to see if it's real. After Don and Harlow do the commercial (performing Ted Lewis's signature number, "Me and My Shadow"), Hal March, the host of The $64,000 Question, comes on to answer questions, as payback for Jack's recent appearance on his show. Because Jack's personally putting up the money, he asks Hal impossible questions and puts him in a spinning isolation booth that makes Hal queasy. Naturally, he misses the $256 "plateau", so Jack gives him a consolation prize: a 1923 Maxwell!
83	4	"Ginger Rogers Show"	November 3, 1957
Special guest: Ginger Rogers. Jack wants Fred Astaire and Ginger Rogers to appear on his show. When he goes to invite Ginger, she makes sure not to tell Jack that she's going to a party, because she doesn't want him to crash it. On the show, Astaire is a no-show, so Jack fills in for him, and the results are just as bad as Ginger had expected.
84	5	"John Forsythe Show"	November 17, 1957
Special guests: John Forsythe and Mary Costa. During the monologue, Jack introduces John Forsythe (who'd just begun appearing on alternate Sundays in Bachelor Father) in the audience. Mary Costa sings "One Fine Day" from Madame Butterfly. Jack has forgotten an important business obligation and can't take Mary out as promised; Forsythe takes her out to an exotic restaurant. While there, they discover Jack working as a Gypsy violinist. In the epilogue, Jack plugs an album by his orchestra: Music for Playboys to Play By.
85	6	"Jack's Life Story"	December 1, 1957
Special guests: Van Johnson and Buddy Adler. When Jack hears that 20th Century Fox is making a movie about his life story, he heads to the studio, expecting to produce, direct, and star in the film. At the studio Jack meets the director of his own infamous film, The Horn Blows at Midnight; the man is now a parking lot attendant. Buddy Adler, the head of production, tells Jack that what they have in mind doesn't involve him. Jack won't even play "Jack"; Van Johnson will. However, they do offer Jack a role: his own father. Originally performed on radio, with Danny Kaye (and the studio as Warner Bros.), in 1944 and 1955.
86	7	"Christmas Shopping Show"	December 15, 1957
This is the television debut of the traditional Christmas shopping show from the radio program. Jack and Rochester shop for gifts in a department store, where Jack has run-ins with floorwalker Frank Nelson and buys lingerie from a clerk who doesn't have the nerve to touch it with his bare hands. In a running gag, Jack has clerk Mel Blanc repeatedly re-wrap the wallet Jack bought for Don because he keeps wanting to change the card inside; after one re-wrap too many, Mel loads a pistol and shoots himself.
87	8	"Jack Goes to the Rose Bowl"	December 29, 1957
In a flashback, Jack's ex-girlfriend Zelda explains why she stopped dating the cheapskate: At Jack's suggestion, the two of them stood in line at the stadium all night and got the last two tickets to the Rose Bowl Game. Zelda went inside while Jack looked for coffee. A man offered to buy Jack's $5.50 ticket for $10; Jack sold it to him, and asked him to tell Zelda that he'd stolen the ticket from Jack.
88	9	"Jack Takes a Beaver to the Dentist"	January 12, 1958
Mrs. Miller, the den mother of the Beverly Hills Beavers, asks Jack to take her two sons to the dentist. When one of the boys complains about having to have a tooth pulled, Jack lectures him about the importance of dental health; he then gets into the chair himself and lets the dentist look into his mouth, to show that it's no big deal. When the dentist finds big problems in Jack's mouth, however, Jack sings a whole new tune.
89	10	"Honeymooners Show"	January 26, 1958
Special guest: Audrey Meadows. Jack introduces Dennis Day, who's upset because he hasn't been on the show in five months. After claiming his loyalty (while insulting Jack), Dennis sings "The Twelfth of Never." The sketch is a parody of The Honeymooners, with Audrey Meadows as Alice, Jack as Ralph, and Dennis as Norton. Ralph accuses Alice of stealing his bowling ball money to buy dresses, and says that he'll get his own dinner. He and Norton eat what they think is tuna salad; Alice doesn't tell them that it's cat food. When the bowling ball she bought for Ralph arrives, he has to tell her, "Baby, you're the greatest!" In the epilogue, Audrey compares the hotel Jack put her up in to the run-down apartment on The Honeymooners.
90	11	"Jack at the Races"	February 9, 1958
Jack and Mary go to the racetrack; Dennis, who's suing Jack for calling him stupid, tags along. Dennis explains his insane system for picking which horse to bet on, but Jack is determined to make a $5 bet on Speedy Girl. At the track, Jack runs into his sponsor, Mr. Lewis, who's betting on another horse; Jack convinces him to change his bet to Speedy Girl. Jack, however, changes his mind and bets on Lewis' original choice. Lewis loses $100, and Jack is such an insufferable winner that he gets punched out — by Mary.
91	12	"Violin Competition with Gisele MacKenzie"	February 23, 1958
Special guest: Gisele MacKenzie. Because Jack feels that a TV show should have an exciting opening, this show begins with a guest getting his head chopped off (English dancer "Gregory Winthrop", making his first- and last- American TV appearance). Gisele chats with Jack and sings a song ("Sail Along, Silv'ry Moon"). When Jack tries to tell a joke, an audience member (Mel Blanc), claiming to be a member of the Los Angeles Chamber of Commerce, interrupts to complain about Jack's smog jokes; the complainer then hacks and coughs from the Los Angeles air. For the middle commercial, Don and Harlow perform a weird song and dance about Siam ("Two Gentlemen From Siam", by Mahlon Merrick). For the finale, Jack invites the band members (and their parole officer) on stage to back him and Gisele on their duet, "Sweet Georgia Brown." Jack's attempt at another duet on "Tea for Two" causes Blanc to return, apologize for his complaint, confiscates Jack's violin, and finishes the duet with Gisele!
92	13	"Academy Awards"	March 9, 1958
Special guests: James Stewart, Jerry Wald, and George Seaton. Jack's upset because he wasn't asked to be one of the emcees of the upcoming Academy Awards. He hassles George Seaton, the president of the Motion Picture Academy, and then Jerry Wald, the producer of the telecast. To placate Jack, Wald says that if one of the five emcees doesn't show, Jack will be the first one he calls. Jack then pays a visit to Jimmy Stewart, who's one of the emcees; Stewart is shooting a film, and Jack destroys several takes. Finally, Jack takes over Jimmy's role and shows him how it's supposed to be done. Partially remade as "Jack Directs a Film" (Nº 210).
93	14	"Railroad Station Show"	March 23, 1958
Jack, Don, and Rochester are going to go to New York to meet with the sponsor, but they can't leave until Chuck the plumber (Mel Blanc) finishes working on Jack's pipes, and Chuck keeps getting calls from his girlfriend about their impending elopement. At the train station, Jack encounters Mr. Kitzel (Artie Auerbach), the loopy PA announcer, and a clueless Information Desk clerk. He also finds that his compartment has been given away to the daughter of clerk Frank Nelson, who gives Jack a live turkey that he'd just won in a raffle. On the train, Frank's daughter and Chuck are married, and Jack plays the violin for the ceremony.
94	15	"Ronnie Burns Show"	April 6, 1958
Special guest: Ronnie Burns. Jack's guest is Ronnie Burns, the son of George Burns, and Ronnie and George each claim to have given the other his first break in show business. Ronnie sings his unsuccessful single, "Kinda Cute." Don is upset because his son Harlow wasn't featured on the show, so he sulks through the commercial and storms off. Later, Jack goes to Don's house to demand an apology for his tantrum; to show Jack Harlow's talent, Don and his son duet on "Sonny Boy."
95	16	"Hillbilly Act"	April 20, 1958
Jack is angry because his writers don't have a script for the next show; saying that he's been working too hard, Jack skips rehearsals and goes to play golf. In a flashback, the agent tells Jack's secretary the ridiculous story of how he discovered Jack: "Zeke" Benny was once a fiddle-playing hick in Arkansas, with a shabby band called the Ozark Hillbillies. They perform "You Are My Sunshine", "Fascinatin' Rhythm", and "Puttin' on the Ritz." A partial remake of episode Nº 5, "Dorothy Shay."
