= The Jack Benny Program season 10 =

The Jack Benny Program
- Season 10
- No. of episodes: 15

Release
- Original network: CBS
- Original release: October 4, 1959 – May 1, 1960

Season chronology
- ← Previous; Season 9 Next → Season 11

This is a list of episodes for the tenth season (1959–60) of the television version of The Jack Benny Program.The Jack Benny Program

== Episodes ==
No. overall	No. in season	Title	Original release date
111	1	"The Jack Benny Program 30 Years in the Future"	October 4, 1959
The series' 10th season debuts with everyone struggling with changes; Jack misses the show opening, having fallen asleep in his dressing room because of the late hour. Don and the Sportsmen Quartet can't break the habit of doing commercials for Lucky Strike, rather than their new sponsor, Lux Soap; at one point, Jack insists, "Stop smoking and start bathing!". Dennis Day sings "While We're Young." In the sketch, Jack imagines The Jack Benny Program 30 years in the future. Everyone looks much older — except Jack.
112	2	"Harry Truman Show"	October 18, 1959
Special guest: Harry S. Truman. Because the show is short on time, Jack has the Sportsmen Quartet perform the minute waltz during the commercial in 40 seconds, rather than cut a mention about his blue eyes. In the main sketch, Benny does a benefit concert in Kansas City, and Truman invites him to tour the Harry S. Truman Library in Independence, Missouri (taped on location). Harry asks Jack's real age before of a portrait of George Washington. Jack is thrilled that the presidential seal is solid gold. At the closing, Truman's secretary (Eleanor Audley) cracks his office door to eavesdrop and hears a piano and a squeaky violin playing.
113	3	"Jack Webb Show"	November 1, 1959
Special guest: Jack Webb. During the monologue, Jack Benny brings out Jack Webb and demands to know why his show paid Webb $5,000; he doesn't sing, dance, or play music, and he's not a real cop! After the Lux Liquid commercial (in which Don appears as "Confucius"!), Benny says that Dragnet is just like a Charlie Chan movie, leading to a sketch called Dragon-net: Benny plays Charlie, and Webb is Number One Son. It features a take-off of Edd "Kookie" Burns from 77 Sunset Strip and jokes about other detective shows on tv. George Gobel appears to plug his series, airing on alternate weeks with the Benny program.
114	4	"Mr. and Mrs. Jimmy Stewart Show"	November 15, 1959
Special guests: James Stewart and Gloria Stewart. In his monologue, Jack informs the audience that Jimmy and Gloria Stewart begged him to come to their anniversary party. However, Jimmy is seen explaining to his wife that he couldn't stop Jack from inviting himself. Benny and his loud, irritating girlfriend share the Stewart's private table at a swanky Beverly Hills restaurant and drive the Stewart's to drastic measures.
115	5	"Jack Paar Show"	November 29, 1959
Special guests: Jack Paar and Joyce Davidson. As a result of the quiz show scandals, Jack says in the monologue that he's going to follow the new CBS policy of honesty, and admits that he's not really 39 ("In February, I will be 43."). Joyce Davidson (later became Mrs. David Susskind) tries to present the Lux commercial, but Don and Jack keep interrupting her. Jack Paar asks Benny to fill in for him as host of The Tonight Show while Paar goes to Honolulu. Benny is hesitant, so Paar offers to show Jack how it's done. Dennis imitates Paar's frequent guest Charlie Weaver. In a running gag, every time someone says anything interesting, Paar interrupts for a commercial.
116	6	"Jack Goes to a Pasadena Fan Club Meeting"	December 13, 1959
After Dennis' performance of "Sinner Man", Jack attends a meeting of the Jack Benny Fan Club, Pasadena chapter, by the club's president and secretary; when Jack learns that they want him to play his violin, he gladly accepts. The club is made up of little old ladies, and Jack sits in the rocking chair of honor. The women swoon and faint with excitement when he plays "Love in Bloom." The gals put together their own swingin' jazz band and join Benny in "Swanee River / When the Saints Come Marchin' In."
117	7	"George Burns Show"	December 27, 1959
Special guest: George Burns. George Burns drops by to visit Jack and Rochester. Benny and Burns both hate their Christmas gifts from Don Wilson — shotguns — and they call the announcer at home and complain. Don recalls, in a flashback, when he took the two comedians duck hunting: The pair were helpless in the wild and had nothing but problems, including a visit from game warden Frank Nelson.
118	8	"Ben Blue Show"	January 10, 1960
Special guest: Ben Blue. Jack tells how he discovered "Chandu the Magician" in Ben Blue's restaurant and got him on his show. Jack puts Chandu (played by Blue) out of commission, making it necessary for Jack to wear the hokey costume and masquerade as the magician. The act is a disaster, thanks in no small part to Jack's inept assistant, Dennis Day.
119	9	"Maurice Gosfield / Amateur Show"	January 24, 1960
Special guest: Maurice Gosfield. Jack searches for the stars of tomorrow with an amateur talent show. The (lack of) talent that tests Benny's patience includes a tuba-playing boy who won't play, a sweet little lady who does a strip routine, and Howard McNear as mind-reader Fletcher Quill. Pvt. Duane Doberman (Maurice Gosfield) from The Phil Silvers Show impersonates Alfred Hitchcock, Charles Boyer, and Bette Davis.
120	10	"George Gobel Show"	February 7, 1960
Special guests: George Gobel and Molly Bee. Needing an ego boost, Jack has Rochester conduct a telephone survey to determine his popularity. Molly Bee plays one of the hicks who are questioned. George Gobel is a Kentucky hillbilly who, it turns out, is the only person in the U.S. who watches Jack, because Benny's is the only show that comes in on his TV. Don does the commercial as a Shakespearean soliloquy accompanied by Jack on his violin. Molly Bee sings "Have You Heard?"
121	11	"Jack Is Arrested"	February 21, 1960
Jack, who's been playing his violin at 2 a.m., is arrested for disturbing the peace. He's taken to the Los Angeles jail (one needs an appointment for the Beverly Hills hoosegow), where the inmates think he has the beautiful hands of a safecracker. Rochester brings a lawyer he found sitting at a desk on a street corner: Frank Nelson. Jack fires him. In court, the judge is cranky because he was kept up all night by "some jerk playing the violin". Frightened to tell the truth, Jack confesses to cracking a safe.
122	12	"Natalie Wood / Robert Wagner Show"	March 6, 1960
Special guests: Natalie Wood and Robert Wagner. Jack badgers network executives into letting him direct an episode of their prestigious drama series Playhouse 90. Natalie Wood and Robert Wagner are the unlucky stars who endure Jack's ridiculous instructions on how to play the scenes. The crew is not so gracious; they quickly grow tired of Jack's foolish orders, walk out, and leave him hanging — from a microphone boom. On one of his rare occasions, Don delivers a "straight" middle commercial for Lux Liquid.
123	13	"Slogan Contest"	April 3, 1960
Jack is convinced he's a shoo-in to win a product slogan contest he enters. When he doesn't win the first prize money, he decides to sue the company sponsoring the product. Benny goes to a lawyer's office and finds the place is overrun with lunatics like Mel Blanc and Dennis Day. Frank Nelson plays the contest promoter.
124	14	"Easter Show"	April 17, 1960
Jack and his loud and pushy girlfriend Mildred (Barbara Nichols) walk in the Beverly Hills Easter Parade. En route they meet many of Jack's usual agitators: Dennis Day, who sings "Easter Parade"; Don Wilson, dressed as an old lady in an Easter bonnet for the Lux commercial; Professor LeBlanc, Jack's violin teacher; Clara and Emma, the two old women who head the Pasadena chapter of Jack's fan club (Madge Blake, Jesslyn Fax); and photographer Frank Nelson.
125	15	"Final Show of the Season"	May 1, 1960
Jack has just returned from a tour of the Far East, and has Don bring him onstage in a rickshaw. He says that in Japan they are watching American shows that are three years old. Benny didn't have the heart to tell them The $64,000 Question was rigged. Dennis Day sings "A Woman in Love." In the skit, Jack meets with his sponsor's reps to renew his contract. The execs (John Hoyt, William Schallert) believe that it's Dennis Day who's getting the laughs. They want to replace Jack with a look-alike dummy that slowly turns his head like Jack doing a take. Benny tells the dummy about the problems it will have with the cast.
