= The Jack Benny Program season 5 =

The Jack Benny Program
- Season 5
- No. of episodes: 16

Release
- Original network: CBS
- Original release: October 3, 1954 – May 1, 1955

Season chronology
- ← Previous; Season 4 Next → Season 6

This is a list of episodes for the fifth season (1954–55) of the television version of The Jack Benny Program.

== Episodes ==
No. overall	No. in season	Title	Original release date
32	1	"Entire Cast Show"	October 3, 1954
Jack falls asleep during the monologue, and Don tells the audience why: Jack had been extremely nervous about the first show of the new season, and had encountered one disaster after another. Don had called in a doctor (Frank Nelson) to calm Jack down; after telling Jack how lousy he was last season, the doctor gave him something that would make him sleep... for 10 hours.
33	2	"Jam Session at Jack's"	October 17, 1954
Special guests: Dick Powell, Tony Martin, Fred MacMurray, Kirk Douglas, and Dan Dailey. In the monologue, Jack reads the newspaper reviews of critics who liked his season premiere, while skipping the ones who did not. For Don's middle commercial, Jack insists he skip rope while singing the Lucky Strike jingle. Jack then hurries home for his weekly jam session with Tony (on clarinet), Fred (saxophone), Dick (trumpet), Dan (drums), and Kirk (banjo). They avail themselves of the coin-operated vending machines in Jack's living room [including the one stocked with his sponsor's cigarettes]. The band plays "Basin Street", but Kirk keeps going into "Bye Bye Blues", the only song he knows.
34	3	"How Jack Found Mary"	October 31, 1954
A writer visits Jack at home and hears the story of how Jack found Mary Livingstone in the fall of 1932: A brash, young Jack goes into the May Company department store to buy a shirt when hosiery counter clerk Mary catches his eye. He flirts shamelessly with Mary while she and her co-worker Sally give him a hard time. Finally, she agrees to meet Jack that evening for dinner. While Jack is posing for photos with the writer, Don and the Sportsmen Quartet drop by; Rochester joins them for a song and dance number.
35	4	"The Giant Mutiny"	November 14, 1954
Special guests: Leo Durocher, Beans Reardon, Chuck Dressen, Fred Haney, and Bob Lemon. Jack stages a baseball version of The Caine Mutiny: Benny is Alvin Dark, captain of the New York Giants. During the fourth game of the World Series, Dark stands up to tyrannical Durocher and is court-martialled. Haney, Reardon, Dressen, and Lemon are the judges, and Durocher (as the Queeg character) rubs two baseballs together.
36	5	"The Life of Jack Benny"	November 28, 1954
Rochester is typing the script for next week's show: Jack Benny's life story. Jack auditions people for the various roles, including a beautiful young woman (Leigh Snowden) to play his first girlfriend (who kisses him passionately), and his actual first girlfriend to play his mother. He passes on a young boy who auditions to play Jack as a boy, instead choosing the pushy young boy who acts as the first boy's agent.
37	6	"Jack Does Christmas Shopping Show"	December 12, 1954
Rochester, after winning a crooked card game, takes the day off and leaves Jack stuck with the household chores. Jack then sticks Don with the work so that he himself can do some holiday grocery shopping. At the store, Jack encounters a surly fruit vendor (Benny Rubin), a racetrack tout (Sheldon Leonard), Mr. Kitzel, and an insulting clerk (Frank Nelson). After having had enough of Jack's inability to find anything, Nelson throws him into a shopping cart and pushes him around the store.
38	7	"San Diego Naval Training Center Show"	December 26, 1954
This show was broadcast live from the Naval Training Center in San Diego. Jack delivers a monologue full of military jokes, then he and Don talk about having been in the Navy. A gown-clad WAVE (Leigh Snowden) walks across now and then to "recruit" future sailors. Mel Blanc appears as Sy, accompanying the Sportsmen Quartet for the middle commercial. Finally, Jack and several band members perform a medley of "Sweet Georgia Brown" and "On the Sunny Side of the Street" on the stage while Rochester dances.
39	8	"Bedroom Burglar"	January 9, 1955
The main sketch in this episode is a remake of the one in episode Nº 13, "Jack Gets Robbed," including the bed/cradle and the live tiger in the safe.
40	9	"Jack and Gisele MacKenzie's Violin Duet"	January 23, 1955
Special guest: Gisele MacKenzie. Jack chats with Gisele MacKenzie, who sings "Mr. Sandman." Jack rushes backstage to his dressing room to find his missing violin; Rochester has hidden it in the air vent. Benny's attempt to tell a joke is interrupted by Don Wilson, who's leading a CBS tour across the stage. One man mistakes Benny for Ann Sothern. After showing she can play the violin, Gisele is challenged to do a duet with Jack. The two perform "Getting to Know You" and a reprise of "Mr. Sandman."
41	10	"Four O'Clock in the Morning Show"	February 6, 1955
Jack is awakened at 4 a.m. by a phone call from Hank, the all-night DJ, who asks him an inane trivia question. Unable to get back to sleep, Jack is drowsy by the afternoon when Mary takes him to buy a new suit at a store managed by Frank Nelson. Falling asleep on his feet, Jack is mistaken for a mannequin, and he wakes up later to find himself in a window display, re-dressed and holding a fishing pole. When Jack finds out that Frank advertises on Hank's all-night radio show, he goes straight for Nelson's throat. Note: this was adapted from a November 1953 radio episode.
42	11	"Jack's Lunch Counter"	February 20, 1955
Special guest: George Raft. After Jack introduces Frank Remley to the audience (on the occasion of his birthday), Dennis interrupts Jack's monologue because he's upset that George Raft got his dressing room. After a loud crash, Dennis' mother (Verna Felton) walks out to say that the room is now Dennis'; she just threw Raft out of it. In the sketch — Death Across the Lunch Counter or Dial M for Mustard — Jack plays a diner owner who's nervous because murderers are on the loose in the area. Three suspicious men come in and two of them (Raft and Day) start to intimidate Jack, although they dance when the jukebox plays "Papa Loves Mambo." Jack shoots Day and Raft (who does a hammy death scene), and discovers that the third man (Frank Nelson) is an interior decorator Jack had hired. Note: this sketch was originally performed on radio in 1946 (with Edward G. Robinson) and 1950 (with Richard Widmark).
43	12	"Jack Takes Beavers to the Fair"	March 6, 1955
In this color episode, Jack takes a group of boys called the Beverly Hills Beavers (one of them is young Harry Shearer) to the fair. Things get off to a bad start; he has to be shot down when he holds too many helium balloons, he falls off the merry-go-round, and he succeeds in ringing the bell at the top of the strength meter only after one of the Beavers sticks a pin in his backside. Several times they run into Mr. Kitzel, who's a "utility player" working wherever he's needed. At one point, Jack steps into a lion cage, thinking the animal is Mr. Kitzel in a costume; it isn't. As Benny and the boys leave, they pass a hula girl show — and the girl is Mr. Kitzel!
44	13	"Gary Crosby Show"	March 20, 1955
Special guest: Gary Crosby. Jack goes to Bing Crosby's mansion to see if Bing will be on his show, even though he won't pay Bing's $10,000 fee. Bing's son Gary is at home, and he sings "I've Got the World on a String." Impressed, Jack wants Gary for the show, especially since he'll perform for $150. Bing (voice only) hears about Jack's scheme and puts a stop to it. Desperate, Jack grabs their butler and takes him to the studio.
45	14	"You Bet Your Life"	April 3, 1955
Special guest: Groucho Marx. When Jack reads that Groucho is giving away $3,000 on You Bet Your Life, he becomes determined to win it (in the meantime, the Sportsmen Quartet masquerade as Groucho to sing "Hooray for Captain Spaulding" as a middle commercial). He disguises himself in a wavy wig and mustache, and comes on the show claiming to be a musician named Ronald (and sometimes Rodney) Forsythe {Groucho ad-libs, "It was Rodney during rehearsal"}. When told that the "secret word" is something found in the home, Jack ignores Groucho's questions and names everything he can think of in his house. Thanks to a smart teammate (Irene Tedrow), Jack is only one question away from the jackpot... but the question is, "Just how old is that lying bum, Jack Benny?" Reluctantly, he answers "39"- and loses the jackpot. Of course, Groucho recognizes Jack after the game is over, and asks why he did not reveal his real age. Jack explains, "I may not be a spendthrift- but brother, I know a bargain when I see one.....where else can you buy 22 years for only $3,000?"
46	15	"Preparing for New York Trip"	April 17, 1955
Jack and Rochester are driven to the train station by a cab driver (Mel Blanc) who keeps crying because he cannot bear to say goodbye; he even follows Jack inside and buys him candy and flowers. In the station, Jack encounters Mr. Kitzel in a kilt, a young couple who won't stop kissing, a racetrack tout who tells him which train he should take, a PA announcer making ridiculous announcements, and Frank Nelson at the ticket window. In the epilogue, Jack brings Mel Blanc out and gives him his paycheck; Mel starts crying again.
47	16	"Jackie Gleason Show"	May 1, 1955
Special guest: Jackie Gleason. Jack and Rochester are in New York, relaxing in the penthouse suite of the luxurious St. Regis Hotel. They're staying free, masquerading as painters; whenever the doorbell rings, they put on painters' caps and toss drop cloths around the room. Jack's awaiting Jackie Gleason for a business meeting. Before Gleason enters the room, the June Taylor Dancers prance in and give him a huge introduction. Gleason and Benny are forming a production company to make movies. Jack thinks the films will star him, but Jackie has heard about The Horn Blows at Midnight and has different ideas. When the hotel manager calls to say he's coming up, Rochester starts throwing out the drop cloths and paint buckets; Benny puts a cap on Gleason and tells him he's the foreman.
