= The Jack Benny Program season 7 =

The Jack Benny Program
- Season 7
- No. of episodes: 16

Release
- Original network: CBS
- Original release: September 23, 1956 – April 21, 1957

Season chronology
- ← Previous; Season 6 Next → Season 8

This is a list of episodes for the seventh season (1956–57) of the television version of The Jack Benny Program.

== Episodes ==
No. overall	No. in season	Title	Original release date
64	1	"Alfred Wallenstein Show"	September 23, 1956
Special guest: Alfred Wallenstein. In the season premiere, Jack is nervous about a violin concert that he is giving at Carnegie Hall. Trying to do some last-minute practicing, he distracted by a pair of locksmiths who he called to open his basement vault; Jack has lost the only key. Alfred Wallenstein, the conductor of the Philharmonic Orchestra for Jack's performance, comes by to offer pointers. He hears little because of all the sawing and grinding coming from the vault. When the locksmiths resort to blasting, Jack plays on, oblivious to all the plaster and debris falling around him.
65	2	"George Burns / Spike Jones Show"	October 7, 1956
Special guests: Spike Jones and George Burns. Recalling his Carnegie Hall performance, Jack has jitters before the show. Spike Jones drops in backstage because he couldn't believe Jack Benny was really playing there. Trying to relax, Jack dreams that Felix Mendelssohn compliments his violin playing (and sneaks in a middle commercial for Luckies as well). In a nightmare, the Devil (George Burns) offers to make Jack the greatest violinist of all time; naturally, there's a catch. Jack begins to play with the orchestra, but the conductor is replaced by Spike Jones. The orchestra begins playing wildly and Jack has to be carried offstage on a stretcher, still playing his violin.
66	3	"George Gobel / Red Skelton Show"	October 21, 1956
Special guests: George Gobel and Red Skelton. Jack and George are opposing candidates for the presidency of the Beverly Hills Beavers; George, who has a nephew in the group, became a candidate when he heard Jack was running. In the end, Jack and George each get only one vote; the winner is another celebrity who has a nephew in the group.
67	4	"Jack Is Invited to the Ronald Colmans"	November 4, 1956
Special guests: Ronald Colman and Benita Hume. In a flashback, Rochester recalls the time Jack went to Ronald and Benita Colman's house for dinner; an invitation meant for the Colmans' friend Jack Wellington wound up on Jack Benny's doorstep. Mr. Benny showed up in gaudy white tie and tails; when Mr. Wellington showed up in a sweater and casual slacks, Benny thought that Wellington was an under-dressed party crasher.
68	5	"Jack's Maxwell Is Stolen"	November 18, 1956
Rochester informs Jack that his Maxwell automobile has been stolen. Unable to phone the Beverly Hills Police Department (because their number is unlisted), Jack goes to the station; the receptionist asks if he has an appointment. The police hounds are French poodles, and the dispatchers play pop records-such as those of Elvis Presley and Lawrence Welk- between radio announcements; every time a tune plays, people dance, with everybody dancing and a bubble machine turning on when Lawrence Welk plays.
69	6	"Jack Locked in the Tower of London"	December 2, 1956
In the first of four episodes filmed on location in Europe, Jack and Mary visit London. While admiring the Crown Jewels, Jack is accidentally locked in the Tower of London. Jack imagines he's in the 16th century, and that Henry VIII has mistaken him for Anne Boleyn's lover Mark Smeaton. The king plans to get revenge on Jack in the torture chamber, but Jack defeats the guards single-handedly and wins a sword fight.
70	7	"The Mikado"	December 16, 1956
Dennis want to do an Elvis Presley number, but Jack says no; he wants to class up the show by performing a condensed version of The Mikado. Jack plays the Lord High Executioner, and Dennis is Nanki-Poo. Instead of singing the Japanese love song he's supposed to, Dennis starts doing his Elvis number while in costume.
71	8	"Talent Show"	December 30, 1956
Special guest: Jayne Mansfield. Jack's monologue is interrupted by Don, who has a purse found by an usher. Jayne Mansfield comes out of the audience to claim it, saying that the usher had snatched it from her and that it was a sneaky way to get a guest star. (She later appeared on Jack's Shower of Stars special on January 10, 1957.) The main sketch is a talent show: Stanley Gropff (Mel Blanc) does animal impressions, the Landrews Sisters sing and dance to "Did You Ever See a Dream Walking," and Judo champ Leon Salvadore (Leon Lontoc) takes on and is beaten up by six big men. (The last bit was done before in episode Nº 6, "Helene Francois Show.")
72	9	"Jack and Mary in Rome"	January 13, 1957
The second of the European episodes: Arriving in Rome, Jack is upset that the rush of adoring fans isn't for him but for opera singer Vittorio Rizetti. After a day of sightseeing with Mary, Jack seems to hear another man singing opera in the hotel room next to his. Thinking he'll make a fortune with an undiscovered singer, Jack quickly signs the man to a tour in the United States, not realizing that the man was simply listening to a record of Vittorio Rizetti. Sean Connery briefly appears as a hotel porter.
73	10	"The Fiddler"	January 27, 1957
Special guest: Harry von Zell. Don introduces fellow announcer Harry von Zell who's in the audience. Jack, impressed with Harry's voice, asks him to do the commercial, which causes Don to quit and storm off. After Dennis sings "On the Street Where You Live", the main sketch starts: Jack plays "The Fiddler" (a parody of "The Whistler"). Dennis plays an air-headed husband who doesn't realize his wife is cheating on him with his best friend. "The Fiddler" comments on the action and encourages murder and mayhem from the players. The sketch, originally performed on radio in 1946 and 1952, was later reused in episode Nº 232, "I Am the Fiddler."
74	11	"Goodwin Knight / George Jessel Show"	February 10, 1957
Special guests: Goodwin Knight and George Jessel. Jack discusses his upcoming birthday, February 14. California Governor Goodwin Knight comes out and chats about the benefit he's attending with Jack as guest of honor. The Sportsmen Quartet sing a birthday song, and do the commercial. In the sketch, George Jessel visits Jack at home to discuss details of the Friars Club banquet honoring Benny. Jessel, who will be toastmaster, reads Jack the text of his speech. When a reporter calls asking for details of the event, George ends up talking only about himself.
75	12	"Hope and Benny in Agent's Office"	February 24, 1957
Special guest: Bob Hope. Jack's monologue on his Emmy Award nomination is interrupted by Bob Hope. The two exchange insults and reminisce about their days as a vaudeville team. In the sketch, the two are a song and dance act auditioning in an agent's office for a gig. Benny plays "Tea for Two" while he and Hope exchange corny jokes. They take a job in Akron, Ohio working for nothing. In the epilogue, Bob and Jack do a special version of Hope's "Thanks for the Memories."
76	13	"Jack Falls Into a Canal in Venice"	March 10, 1957
The third of the European episodes: Jack tells Rochester about his trip with Mary to Milan and Venice. In the flashback, Jack got to play a Stradivarius, but his terrible playing caused its value to instantly drop. Jack and Mary joined a tour group in a gondola, but Jack kept disrupting the guide's lecture with his rude behavior and his accidental falls into the canal; at one point he even tossed another American into the water.
77	14	"Jack in Paris"	March 24, 1957
Special guest: Maurice Chevalier. The last of the four European episodes: Jack and Mary visit Paris. Jack gets the hotel waiter to give him French lessons, but doesn't pay him; the waiter gets back at him by teaching Jack to introduce himself by saying (in French), "I am Jack Benny. I drive a garbage truck." After visiting the Eiffel Tower, Jack and Mary run into Maurice Chevalier, who invites them to join him for an evening on the town. In his usual clueless way, Jack embarrasses Mary and Maurice at a fancy restaurant. At a nightclub, the bandleader asks Maurice to sing, and he performs "Happy." At the end of the night, Jack and Mary catch a ride back to their hotels on a garbage truck.
78	15	"Mary's May Company Reunion"	April 7, 1957
Mary hosts a reunion luncheon for her old co-workers at the May Company. In a flashback within a flashback, Mary says that Jack had first proposed to her after they'd been dating for only six weeks, but he backed down when he found out how much the ring would cost. After hearing how cheap Jack was, the co-workers throw the salad at him.
79	16	"Visit from the IRS"	April 21, 1957
Special guests: Dorothy Kirsten, Marge Champion, and Gower Champion. Opera star Dorothy Kirsten, who will be performing in a benefit show with Jack next week, sings "I'll See You Again." Marge and Gower appear to promote their own series, which briefly alternated with Jack's that spring. Jack is visited by IRS agents who want to go over his return; they can't believe that he spent only $17 on entertainment last year. Jack decides he may be too tight, and tells everyone to loosen up and spend more on themselves; he figures people will pay good money to hear him lecture on the subject.
