= The Jack Benny Program season 4 =

Season of television series

The Jack Benny Program
- Season 4
- No. of episodes: 13

Release
- Original network: CBS
- Original release: September 13, 1953 – May 23, 1954

Season chronology
- ← Previous; Season 3 Next → Season 5

This is a list of episodes for the fourth season (1953–54) of the television version of The Jack Benny Program. This season is mostly known for Humphrey Bogart and Marilyn Monroe being on the show (separately). This year had major movie stars of the time, more likely to attract more viewers. The show's rankings had gone down 33% from last year, but the show was still popular, and the next season would get more views. This season the program was the 16th highest-ranking show.

== Episodes ==
No. overall	No. in season	Title	Original release date
19	1	"Honolulu Trip"	September 13, 1953
Special guest: Marilyn Monroe; Jack tells the audience about the trip he took with Rochester (Eddie Anderson) to Hawaii when a travelogue announcer (Paul Frees) takes over the story. Before boarding the cruise ship at the end of their vacation, Rochester is crowned King Kamehameha VI by the islanders. On the return cruise home, Jack encounters "Dr. Kinsey" (of sex study fame) and Mr. Kitzel (Artie Auerbach). Falling asleep in a deck chair, Jack dreams the heavyset woman (Maxine Gates) beside him is Marilyn Monroe and that she finds him irresistible. She coos the song "Bye Bye, Baby" to Jack and agrees to meet him for dinner. He chases after her, being awakened by a huge kiss from the chubby woman. In the epilogue, Jack thanks Marilyn for making her TV debut with him, and plugs her new film How to Marry a Millionaire. Jack mentions his infamous film, The Horn Blows at Midnight.
20	2	"Jack as a Child"	October 4, 1953
A reporter is writing Jack's biography, and Jack flashes back to his childhood: Young Benny argues with his father (played by Jack), who wants him to play violin for the love of music rather than for the money, a notion that shocks the child. The Benny family's friends and relatives gather for the weekly Sunday musicale.
21	3	"Humphrey Bogart Show"	October 25, 1953
Special guest: Humphrey Bogart. In the sketch, Detective Benny is interrogating Baby Face Bogart, who says that he knows nothing about the murder of Blinky Mason. Benny tries to get tough with him, but Baby Face keeps slapping him back. During the interrogation Baby Face sings the Lucky Strike commercial, after which he pulls a gun on Benny, who runs from the building. In the epilogue, Jack thanks Bogart and plugs his new movie, Beat the Devil.
22	4	"Johnny Ray Show"	November 15, 1953
Special guests: Johnnie Ray and Danny Thomas. Johnnie Ray's contract to appear on the show arrives at Jack's home, and Jack's horrified by the $10,000 fee. He goes to Ray's home and tries to offer him $250 instead. Johnnie sings "Please Don't Talk About Me When I'm Gone" and "Cry" for Jack, and his performance is so devastating that Jack is turned into a helpless bowl of jelly; he pays Johnnie $15,000. At the end of the show, Danny Thomas makes a guest appearance to plug his show, Make Room for Daddy.
23	5	"Irene Dunne Show"	December 6, 1953
Special guests: Irene Dunne, Vincent Price, and Gregory Ratoff. Jack reads that Gregory Ratoff is planning a new movie starring Irene Dunne and Vincent Price. Thinking that he would be perfect for the lead role, Jack calls both Ratoff and Dunne, trying to persuade them to replace Price with him. When that fails, he invites himself to the rehearsal and disrupts it by cracking walnuts and blowing the small part they give him to read. Note: this was the first filmed episode of the series; from here on, Jack appeared in both live (after 1959, videotaped) and several filmed episodes each season.
24	6	"Reminiscing About Last New Year's"	December 27, 1953
In the monologue, Jack talks about his Christmas and recalls how he spent New Year's: In the sketch, Jack has a big night planned with his girlfriend Gloria, but calls to cancel at the last minute. After wandering the streets alone, Jack stops for coffee in a cafe, where Gloria (Sandra Gould) is working as a waitress. Later, Jack comes home to find Rochester preparing to go out and celebrate; Rochester won't leave Jack all alone on New Year's Eve, so he stays home with Jack and they ring in the new year together.
25	7	"Liberace Show"	January 17, 1954
Special guest: Liberace. Jack goes to Liberace's candelabra-filled home, where even the gardener wears a tuxedo. Liberace asks Jack to fill in for his brother George at a concert he's giving that evening. At the concert Liberace performs a solo, and then he and Jack play "September Song", with Jack on violin.
26	8	"Jack Dreams He's Married to Mary"	February 7, 1954
Jack thinks Mary is coming over to accept one of his numerous marriage proposals, but instead she gives him a lecture about his stinginess. Jack then dozes on the couch and dreams that he and Mary get married; later in the dream, it's their 21st anniversary and Jack is a failed radio actor and a house husband, and Mary is still working at the May Company. Even in the dream, Mary starts laying into Jack for being a cheapskate.
27	9	"Helen Hayes Show"	February 28, 1954
Special guest: Helen Hayes. Jack wants to perform in legitimate theater, so he goes to New York and seeks out Helen Hayes to teach him to be a dramatic actor. He gets his big break when one of Helen's student's falls ill and can't be in the class performance that night. It turns out to be a children's play, and Helen has Jack hopping around in a bunny suit.
28	10	"Goldie, Fields and Glide"	March 21, 1954
Special guests: George Burns, Bing Crosby, and Bob Hope. Jack wants George Burns and Bing Crosby to re-create their old vaudeville routine on his show; George, Bing, and Jack used to be a (less-than-successful) song and dance team called "Goldie, Fields, and Glide." George and Bing say they'll do it, but Bing wants $10,000 more than Jack is prepared to pay. Bing finds himself stuck in a tree, where he meets Bob Hope, another star who made the mistake of asking for too much money.
29	11	"Burns and Allen Show"	April 11, 1954
Special guests: George Burns and Gracie Allen. This is a remake of episode Nº 8, "Gracie Bit."
30	12	"David Niven Show"	May 2, 1954
Special guests: David Niven and Margaret Hayes. The sketch is an English drawing-room farce, in which Jack plays handsome British screen lover Cecil Frothingham. He's having a secret affair with Lady Milbank; news of it reaches Lord Milbank (Niven), but he's more interested in his stamp collection. When Cecil finds out how valuable it is, he becomes more interested in it too.
31	13	"Road to Nairobi"	May 23, 1954
Special guests: Bob Hope, Dean Martin, and Jerry Lewis. In the prologue, Bob steals Jack's pants from his dressing room so that Bob can do the monologue instead. Jack comes out wearing Don's oversized pants, and Don is later stuck wearing Jack's too-small pants. In the sketch, Jack and Bob are explorers in Africa who are attacked by cannibals and thrown into a huge stew pot. The natives can't light the fire, but Martin and Lewis run in with a match.
