= The Jack Benny Program season 3 =

The Jack Benny Program
- Season 3
- No. of episodes: 8

Release
- Original network: CBS
- Original release: October 5, 1952 – May 17, 1953

Season chronology
- ← Previous; Season 2 Next → Season 4

This is a list of episodes for the third season (1952–53) of the television version of The Jack Benny Program. This season the program was the 12th highest-ranked television show.

Season 3 was the first televised season of The Jack Benny Program to air on a regular schedule, appearing once every four weeks. The next season would increase the show's frequency to every three weeks; by the fifth season, it would settle into appearing every two weeks, a pattern it would follow for the next several years.

== Episodes ==
No. overall	No. in season	Title	Original release date
11	1	"Bob Crosby's Contract"	October 5, 1952
Special guest: Marilyn Monroe. New cast member Bob Crosby refuses to sing until his contract is signed; Bob finally performs "You Belong to Me", and Jack invites him over to sign the contract after the show. Before Bob arrives, Jack and Rochester wreck the house and make it look like a shabby hovel, to make Bob think that Benny is broke and convince him to sign for only $50 a week. Bob has a trick of his own, parading his kids in as starving, shabbily-dressed waifs. Jack bites and agrees to sign Bob for $500 a week.
12	2	"Buck Benny Rides Again"	November 2, 1952
Special guests: Dinah Shore, Hank Mann, and James Flavin. In a cowboy sketch, Dinah's forced to sing in a saloon to raise $2,000 to pay off her mortgage or she'll have to marry bad guy Tombstone Harry. In a filmed segment, "Buck" Benny competes in a rodeo for the money, but loses. Angry Dinah tries to shoot Benny with his own screwy gun, but kills Harry instead.
13	3	"Jack Gets Robbed"	November 30, 1952
In the opening monologue, Jack is pestered for an autograph by a little girl (Beverly Washburn) claiming to be Margaret Truman from Washington, D.C. Bob Crosby sings "Peter Pan" with an assist from the child. At home, Jack tries to fall asleep but is awakened by a leaky bathroom faucet. Rochester comes and fixes it, then rocks Jack to sleep in his bed/crib. As he snoozes, two thieves come in the bedroom window and encounter booby traps in his dresser drawers and a live tiger in his safe.
14	4	"Cafe Skit"	December 28, 1952
Special guests: James Stewart and Gloria Stewart. Jimmy and Gloria Stewart plan a romantic New Year's Eve at a French restaurant. Their night is destroyed by a self-invited Jack and his uncouth date, telephone operator Mabel Flapsaddle (Bea Benaderet). Jack and Mabel make a spectacle of themselves by dancing like goons, tripping waiters and fighting with other patrons. Mable causes Jimmy to squirm when she serenades him with a loud rendition of "You Belong to Me." The evening is made when her pal from work, Gertrude Gearshift (Sara Berner), shows up with her doltish boyfriend who has been in high school nine years.
15	5	"60 Piece Orchestra Skit"	January 25, 1953
In an interview in his dressing room, Jack tells a reporter (Alix Talton) how he would rather have been a concert violinist than a comedian. In flashbacks, Jack, as a small boy and as a teen, does nothing but practice his violin. He imagines that he is soloist with a philharmonic orchestra. To the cheers of the audience and his fellow musicians, he wows them with his rendition of "Love in Bloom." In the epilogue, Jack invites Ann Sothern up from the audience to plug her series Private Secretary which airs three out of four weeks with Benny.
16	6	"Dr. Jekyll and Mr. Hyde"	March 22, 1953
The sketch is a take-off of Dr. Jekyll and Mr. Hyde, with Jack playing both of the title roles. Bob Crosby, as a medical student, performs "A Foggy Day in London Town." The good doctor's new potion turns him into a murderous madman who recycles one of his patients into a teaching skeleton. Hyde is finally brought down by another patient who is pumped up with vitamins. This episode was originally scheduled for February 22nd, but was postponed at the last minute until Jack recovered from severe stomach cramps the night before.
17	7	"Fred Allen Show"	April 19, 1953
Special guests: Fred Allen and Eddie Cantor. Jack is in the lobby of his sponsor's office to renew his contract option. Meanwhile, inside Mr. Lewis' office, Fred Allen is trying to convince Lewis to put Jack "out to pasture" and hire Fred for the show. Allen hides in a closet as Jack enters. When Mr. Lewis says he wants a few days to think it over, Jack smells a louse. Leaving, Benny opens the wrong door, finds Allen and hits the roof. After the pair have reconciled, Eddie Cantor pops out of another closet and pitches Mr. Lewis on making him the star of the show.
18	8	"Visit to the Vault"	May 17, 1953
Special guest: Gisele MacKenzie. Jack prepares a dinner party to celebrate the end of the TV season. Bob Crosby and Gisele MacKenzie arrive before the other guests and sing a Lucky Strike commercial. Jack still owes Gisele money for a previous concert engagement she did with him, so he takes her down to his fabled vault. (Bob passes since he's already seen the vault of his brother Bing.) The pair dodge various security contraptions including a moat containing an alligator, a camera that takes photos of everyone who enters, sirens, and Ed (Joseph Kearns), the guard who hasn't been above ground in decades.
