= The Jack Benny Program season 6 =

The Jack Benny Program
- Season 6
- No. of episodes: 16

Release
- Original network: CBS
- Original release: September 25, 1955 – April 22, 1956

Season chronology
- ← Previous; Season 5 Next → Season 7

This is a list of episodes for the sixth season (1955–56) of the television version of The Jack Benny Program.

== Episodes ==
| No. overall | No. in season | Title | Original release date |
|---|---|---|---|
| 48 | 1 | "Jack Goes to Dennis' House" | September 25, 1955 |
After Dennis sings "The Yellow Rose of Texas", Jack flashes back to the previous day: Jack is about to start a new season, and everyone is badgering him with suggestions and demands, such as Don Wilson's wife insisting that Jack should stop making jokes about Don's weight. When Jack drops by Dennis Day's house to discuss a song, Dennis' mother (Verna Felton) starts saying that Jack isn't giving her son the treatment and exposure he deserves.
| 49 | 2 | "Massage and Date with Gertrude" | October 9, 1955 |
After a show Jack hopes for a relaxing massage, but the masseur is Frank Nelson, who rubs him down with chicken fat. Later, Jack takes Gertrude (Bea Benaderet) to a dumpy French restaurant that's crowded with Paris sewer workers. A pair of Apache dancers perform too close to Jack's table, and Jack finds himself literally pulled into the act. The restaurant owner crams another guest at Jack's table, who tells Jack that he smells like chicken fat.
| 50 | 3 | "Peggy King and Art Linkletter" | October 23, 1955 |
Special guests: Peggy King and Art Linkletter. During the monologue, Jack is heckled by audience member Franque Finque (Mel Blanc), who wants to win a refrigerator. Jack introduces Peggy King, a cast member of The George Gobel Show, who says that George is funnier than Jack; she sings "This Is Where Love Walks Out, Brother." Art Linkletter hosts a segment from his show House Party, where he interviews children; after talking to actual children, he brings out another batch of "kids" played by Don, Peggy, Jack, and Rochester. The sketch ends when Franque Finque takes the stage demanding his refrigerator.
| 51 | 4 | "Isaac Stern Boosts Jack's Morale" | November 6, 1955 |
Special guest: Isaac Stern. When Jack's latest violin lesson causes Professor LeBlanc to attempt suicide, Jack becomes depressed. Rochester comes up with a scheme to boost Jack's confidence: he tricks Jack into thinking that music being played by Isaac Stern (who's hiding in the closet) is actually a recording of Jack's violin playing. Delighted, Jack hurries to a recording studio to cut a record, but his music destroys the equipment. After discovering the truth, Jack thanks Rochester for his efforts. For an encore, Stern and pianist Alexander Zakin perform "Polonaise Nº 1 in D Major" by Wieniawski.
| 52 | 5 | "Jack Gives Johnny Carson Advice" | November 20, 1955 |
Special guest: Johnny Carson. Johnny Carson says that Jack is his idol, but has some constructive criticism for him, which he doesn't take well. In the sketch, Jack is being stalked by someone in a trench coat; it turns out to be Dennis Day, who's angry because he wasn't on tonight's show. In the epilogue, Dennis sings "Love and Marriage" (with a new verse about "Jack and Money"). Jack also plugs Johnny's CBS variety show, which ended four months later.
| 53 | 6 | "Jack Hunts for Uranium" | December 4, 1955 |
Jack believes he can make big money by looking for uranium in the desert. After stopping at a camping supply store (where Frank Nelson works), Jack, Mary, and Rochester head into the desert and set up camp. Later, Jack overhears a group of men talking about digging nearby the next day; believing they're also uranium hunters, Jack gets up early the next morning and start digging in the spot they were talking about. He digs a six-foot-deep hole before he discovers that they're just repairing a gas pipeline.
| 54 | 7 | "Frances and Edgar Bergen" | December 18, 1955 |
Special guests: Edgar Bergen and Frances Bergen. After the Sportsmen Quartet perform a Christmas musical number, "That's How Santa Claus Will Look This Year" (which segues into a middle commercial), Jack goes to Edgar Bergen's house to talk about being on the show; while he waits for Edgar, Frances sings a song. Jack then discovers that Edgar's dummies, Charlie McCarthy and Mortimer Snerd, are alive and can walk around. When Edgar arrives, he has Jack sit on his knee while they discuss the show.
| 55 | 8 | "New Year's Day Show" | January 1, 1956 |
Special guests: Henry Russell Sanders, Charles Herbert, Duffy Daugherty, and Gene Twambley. Jack reads fake telegrams wishing him a Happy New Year, then chats with the coaches from tomorrow's Rose Bowl Game, Sanders of UCLA and Daugherty of Michigan State. (Michigan State won, 17-14.); The Sportsmen Quartet perform You Gotta Be a Football Hero as a middle commercial. For the last 12 years, Jack has done a New Year's piece on the radio called The New Tenant in which the Old Year steps aside for the New Year; tonight they re-stage it for the camera, essentially doing a radio show on TV.
| 56 | 9 | "Don Invites Gang to Dinner" | January 15, 1956 |
Jack blames his nasty cold on Don Wilson, and wants to fire him. He tells the story in a flashback: Don had invited Jack and the gang to his house for dinner but, despite Jack's repeated advice, didn't call his wife to let her know about it. Once they were at Don's house, Don decided to tell his wife that some people from work might drop by, and then have the others "arrive" one at a time. Jack was the last one left, and he was detained by a burglar in the rain (during which they did the famous "Your money or your life" routine). In the present, Jack decides not to fire Don because Jack feels guilty about how little he's paying him.
| 57 | 10 | "How Jack Met Rochester" | January 29, 1956 |
Special guest: Sarah Churchill. After The Sportsmen Quartet perform Mad Dogs and Englishmen as a middle commercial, Jack tells his guest Sarah how he met Rochester: Jack was making his big move from New York to Hollywood, and Rochester, who was a porter on the train Jack was taking, discovered that Jack was smuggling Don and Dennis in his berth. Rochester promised to keep it quiet, but the conductor found out and fired Rochester on the spot; feeling badly about this, Jack offered him a job as his butler and nursemaid.
| 58 | 11 | "William Holden / Frances Bergen Show" | February 12, 1956 |
Special guests: William Holden, Frances Bergen, and Mervyn LeRoy. Jack introduces Holden, Bergen, and LeRoy in the audience, and has Frances come on stage and talk about a film offer she's had. When she tells Jack that the reason he doesn't get drama roles is that he has no sex appeal, he tries to prove her wrong by improvising a lame love scene with her. Holden comes onstage to show Jack how it's done; after a kiss from Holden, Bergen goes limp. This episode also marked the first appearance of Don Wilson's "son" Harlow (Dale White), who appeared frequently to help him deliver the sponsor's middle commercial, to Jack's perpetual annoyance.
| 59 | 12 | "Rochester Sleeps Through Jack's Show" | February 26, 1956 |
Jack relies on Rochester, his toughest critic, to give him an honest evaluation of the show, but when Rochester accidentally sleeps through the program, he tries to cover up with evasive answers to Jack's questions. At first Jack is angry when he discovers the truth, but later he sees Rochester packing and is afraid that he's leaving (unaware that Rochester is simply getting ready for a camping trip). Jack offers him extra days off — even Labor Day — and makes him a steak dinner, and Rochester milks the situation for all it is worth.
| 60 | 13 | "Jack Drives to Palm Springs" | March 11, 1956 |
Jack, Rochester, and Polly the parrot head to Palm Springs for vacation. Upon arrival, Jack heads straight for the pool and jumps off the diving board, unaware that the pool's been drained for cleaning. Jack spends the rest of his vacation in bed, putting up with the hotel doctor (Frank Nelson) and comments from Rochester, Mary, and Don.
| 61 | 14 | "Jack Opens Beverly Hills Office" | March 25, 1956 |
Special guest: Dore Schary. Jack opens a business office in Beverly Hills, and cuts expenses by sharing the suite with an interior decorator and hiring a surly drugstore waitress as a receptionist. Dore Schary, the head of MGM, comes to talk to Jack about a movie role, but Jack's not thrilled with the part or the money. Dore makes an offer to the decorator instead.
| 62 | 15 | "Gisele MacKenzie Show" | April 8, 1956 |
Special guest: Gisele MacKenzie. Gisele MacKenzie chats with Jack and sings "Poor People of Paris." Don and Lois Wilson beg Jack to give their son Harlow (Dale White) one more chance to do the commercial; Lois says that Harlow fouled it up last time because Don had yelled at him. Harlow does the commercial, and does so badly that Lois loses her temper and smashes Jack's violin over Harlow's head. Once again, Jack and Gisele perform their violin duet, "Getting to Know You."
| 63 | 16 | "Jack Tries to Get a Passport" | April 22, 1956 |
Preparing for his European vacation, Jack is at the passport office. He get shuffled from window to window; his picture is taken by Mel Blanc, who hands everyone the same photo of Rock Hudson; and he encounters bureaucrat Frank Nelson, who's not wearing any pants. Everyone gives Jack a dirty look when he repeatedly claims to be 39.
