= The Jack Benny Program season 2 =

The Jack Benny Program
- Season 2
- No. of episodes: 6

Release
- Original network: CBS
- Original release: November 4, 1951 – June 1, 1952

Season chronology
- ← Previous; Season 1 Next → Season 3

The second season of The Jack Benny Program consisted of six episodes, during 1951 and 1952. As with the previous season, this second television season of The Jack Benny Program included only irregularly scheduled special broadcasts, and overlapped with his radio program of the same name which would continue until 1955. The television program would last until 1965. The coast to coast coaxial cable had been opened in October, 1951 allowing the program to be broadcast live from Los Angeles. Prior to the opening of CBS Television City in November, 1952, this season's episodes were broadcast from Columbia Square, from which Benny's radio show was also broadcast.

This season, the program was number nine in the television rankings. Jack Benny would adopt a more regular schedule with the television program beginning in Season 3.

== Episodes ==
No. overall	No. in season	Title	Original release date
5	1	"Dorothy Shay"	November 4, 1951
Special guests: Dorothy Shay and Frank Remley. Jack's monologue is interrupted by Bob Crosby singing a song, Don Wilson arriving late, and cabbie Mel Blanc bringing in Don's briefcase. Dorothy Shay sings "Beverly Hills", then introduces Zeke Benny and his Mad Mountain Boys from the Ozarks. The hillbilly band, consisting of members of Jack's studio orchestra (including Frank Remley, Wayne Songer, Charlie Bagby and Sammy Weiss, whom Jack often referred to), performs "You Are My Sunshine" and a medley of "Fascinating Rhythm"/"Puttin' on the Ritz". Zeke (Jack) introduces a young, preteen vocalist as his wife (and Sammy as their son!)
6	2	"Helene Francois Show"	December 16, 1951
Special guest: Helene Francois. After a monologue about Christmas presents for his cast and crew, Jack introduces Helene Francois, a French singer he found in a New York nightclub. Don tries to impress her by wearing a beret and a velvet coat. Lynette Bryant, who played the under-aged hillbilly wife in the previous show, comes back for a chat with Jack. A jujitsu expert, who claims he can throw anyone within 12 seconds, faces six big men from the gym, who promptly beat the heck out of him.
7	3	"Gaslight"	January 27, 1952
Special guests: Ray Noble and Barbara Stanwyck. In the monologue Jack discusses his film career. Pianist Ray Noble performs "Good Night Sweetheart." The sketch is a parody of the movie Gaslight: Bella's husband, a jewel thief, is trying to make her think she's crazy by turning the pictures upside down and putting a horse in the closet. A Scotland Yard inspector (Bob Crosby) comes to her rescue.
8	4	"Gracie Bit"	March 9, 1952
Special guests: George Burns and Gracie Allen. It's ten minutes to air time and Gracie is missing; George talks Jack into dressing in drag and filling in for Gracie. After being made-up by Frank Nelson, Jack performs a standard Burns & Allen routine with George. Gracie arrives and, not recognizing Jack, thinks that George is fooling around with Tallulah Bankhead and storms off. Later, Don says that he needs his girdle back so he can fit into his car.
9	5	"Isaac Stern Show"	April 20, 1952
Special guest: Isaac Stern. Dennis wants to do his Johnnie Ray impression on the show, but Jack wants to do a classy number instead. Isaac Stern performs "Introduction and Rondo capriccioso" by Saint-Saëns; Jack joins him for a duet of "Flight of the Bumblebee." In Stern's honor, Jack introduces Dennis performing "Will You Remember (Sweetheart)?" from Maytime backed by ten violinists in tails. Day promptly launches into Johnnie Ray's hit "Cry."
10	6	"Jack Prepares for a Trip to England"	June 1, 1952
Special guest: Ronald Coleman. Jack and Rochester are packing for Jack's summer concert tour of England and Scotland. Jack's doctor chases him down to give him an inoculation shot; Don drops by with wax fruit and the Sportsmen, who sing "Bye Bye Benny"; Jack's agent auditions a supporting act for Jack's show, the Landrews Sisters, who perform "Did You Ever See a Dream Walking?" Throughout it all, Ronald Coleman's butler, Sherwood, reclaims everything Jack has borrowed from them; when he's through, the Benny house is bare.
