= Frank Nelson (actor) =

American comedic actor (1911–1986)

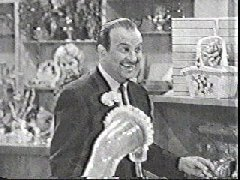
- Nelson in The Jack Benny Program episode "Jack Does His Christmas Shopping" (1954)
- Born: Frank Brandon Nelson; May 6, 1911; Colorado Springs, Colorado, U.S.
- Died: September 12, 1986 (aged 75); Hollywood, California, U.S.
- Occupations: Actor; Comedian
- Years active: 1926–1986
- Spouses: Mary Lansing (m. 1933–1969) Veola Vonn (m. 1970–1986)

Frank Brandon Nelson (May 6, 1911 – September 12, 1986) was an American comedic actor best known for playing put-upon foils on radio and television, and especially for his "EEE-Yeeeeeeeeesssss?" catchphrase.

He made numerous guest appearances on television shows, including The Jack Benny Program, I Love Lucy, The Real McCoys, The Addams Family, Alice, and Sanford and Son. He also provided voices for animated series such as The Flintstones, Mister Magoo, The Jetsons, Dinky Dog and Snorks.

== Career ==
=== Radio ===
Nelson began his entertainment career in radio, and later moved into television and movies. In 1926, at age 15, Nelson played the role of a 30-year-old man in a series broadcast from KOA in Denver, Colorado.

In 1929, Nelson moved to Hollywood, California, and worked in local dramatic broadcasts, usually playing the leading man. The first sponsored program in which he appeared that reached a national market was Flywheel, Shyster, and Flywheel, a sitcom that aired from November 28, 1932, to May 22, 1933, starring Groucho and Chico Marx, and written primarily by Nat Perrin and Arthur Sheekman.

=== Work with Jack Benny ===
Nelson first found fame as the put-upon foil to Jack Benny on Benny's radio show during the 1940s and 1950s. Nelson began to appear on Benny's radio show in the late 1930s, doing various roles, but his eventual character began to take form around 1942. Nelson, whose character was never given a name, typically portrayed a sales clerk, dentist or customer service worker, and Benny's character would run into him seemingly out of nowhere. Whatever his occupation in a particular episode, Nelson's character would usually be polite and patient with all of his customers except for Benny.

Nelson also appeared on Benny's television show beginning in 1950, doing the same "rude clerk" shtick. His other catchphrase, that would be worked into every routine, would have Benny asking something mundane, such as, "Do these shirts come in a medium?", and Frank would bellow, "Oo-oo-oo-ooh, DO they!"

=== Other work ===
Nelson performed on a number of Hollywood-based radio shows during this time, including Fibber McGee and Molly, and did radio work well into the late 1950s, on the few shows that remained on the air, including dramatic roles on such programs as Yours Truly, Johnny Dollar.

After Jack Benny, Nelson continued to work in sitcoms in similar roles, most notably in The Hank McCune Show and I Love Lucy. Nelson appeared as various characters during all six seasons of I Love Lucy (including the recurring role of game show host Freddie Fillmore) and also appeared in two episodes as neighbor Ralph Ramsey, after the Ricardos moved to Westport, Connecticut in season six. He further appeared in The New Phil Silvers Show and The Addams Family in the 1960s.

=== Later years ===
Toward the end of his life, Nelson enjoyed some newfound stardom among a younger generation of fans. He appeared in a string of commercials for McDonald's doing his trademark "EEE-yeeeeeeeeesssss?" catchphrase during its 1981 vacation sweepstakes promotional campaign, in which he played an over-the-top passport agent. In a Green Giant commercial in 1979, Nelson voiced a raccoon who snatches green beans from Sprout's wagon. He also did a cameo appearance on the December 5, 1981, episode of Saturday Night Live as a newsstand vendor, when Tim Curry was the guest host.

In addition to his onscreen work, Nelson was an in-demand voiceover artist for animated cartoons. In 1954, he narrated Walter Lantz's cartoon short Dig That Dog. In television cartoons, he made several appearances on The Flintstones, Calvin and the Colonel, The Jetsons, and (as Governor Wetworth) on The Snorks, among other programs. Between 1978 and 1979, he provided the voice of Uncle Dudley on Dinky Dog. He also served as national president of AFTRA (a performers' union) between 1954 and 1957.

Nelson occasionally appeared in films in variations of his oily clerk characterization. One of his roles is in Down Memory Lane (1949), in which he plays the manager of a TV station. He also appears in So You Want to Know Your Relatives, a Joe McDoakes spoof of This Is Your Life; Nelson plays the master of ceremonies, ushering guests onstage.

== Death ==
Nelson was diagnosed with cancer in 1985. After a yearlong battle, he died in Hollywood on September 12, 1986, at the age of 75. He was entombed in Forest Lawn Memorial Park Cemetery in Glendale.

== Legacy ==
His distinctive appearance and manner of saying "yes?" has been parodied frequently in film, radio and television, most notably with the character on The Simpsons called the "Frank Nelson Type" (aka "Yes Guy"). Nelson's appearance and mannerisms were also parodied multiple times in the Disney Afternoon series TaleSpin, with Nelson represented by a large hippopotamus in a suit. The Daily Show often features a Nelson impression by host Jon Stewart after a setup clip, often "Yeeesss?" or "Go onnnnnnn ..." followed by another clip which serves as the punchline. The ongoing comic strip Gasoline Alley occasionally features a character known as “Mr. Nelson,” who is drawn to resemble Frank Nelson. In classic fashion, he appears in almost any professional capacity that a main character might be seeking, from department store sales associate to tree service owner.

== Partial filmography ==
- Fugitive in the Sky (1936) as Radio Announcer (uncredited)
- Gang Bullets (1938) as Radio Announcer (uncredited)
- The Milkman (1950) as Mr. Green
- Bonzo Goes to College (1952) Dick
- It Should Happen To You (1954) as Harold At Macy's (uncredited)
- It's Always Fair Weather (1955) (uncredited)
- The Malibu Bikini Shop (1986) as Richard J. Remington (final movie role, film released after his death)
